= This Is Your Laugh =

Australian television talk show

- Presented by: Andrew O'Keefe
- Country of origin: Australia
- No. of episodes: 16

Production
- Running time: 44 minutes (w/o commercials)

Original release
- Network: 7HD
- Release: 30 November 2008 – 14 April 2009

This is Your Laugh was an Australian television talk show broadcast by 7HD. It was the second Australian television program to be produced exclusively for an HDTV multichannel, the first being The NightCap. The show began broadcasting on 30 November 2008 on Sunday evenings at 8.30pm, where it aired for nine episodes. It returned on 8.30 Saturday 14 February where another two episodes aired, after which it was moved to a late night timeslot on Tuesday's where the last five episodes of the series aired.

== Synopsis ==
The show was hosted by Deal or No Deal and Weekend Sunrise host Andrew O'Keefe who interviews two celebrities who talk about their achievements and their experiences. Some of these experiences are then reenacted comically by a cast of improvisational actors that includes Nicola Parry, Rebecca De Unamuno, Toby Truslove and Daniel Cordeaux. Musician Gep Blake provides music and sound effects. The program's producer was TV comedy veteran Marc Gracie.

== Episode list ==
The table below shows the guests of each of the series' sixteen episodes.

Ep #	Guests
1	Jo Stanley and Umbilical Brothers
2	Joe Hockey and Tottie Goldsmith
3	Dylan Lewis and Matt Welsh
4	Daniel MacPherson and Janine Allis
5	Mark Seymour and Steve Hooker
6	Luke Jacobz and Tim Ferguson
7	Alex Perry and Akmal Saleh
8	Charli Delaney and Blair McDonough
9	Toni Pearen and Anh Do
10	Jade MacRae and Peter Alexander
11	Kate Ceberano and Tom Gleeson
12	Angry Anderson and Cal Wilson
13	Sara Groen and Adrian Belew
14	Kamahl and Corinne Grant
15	Molly Meldrum and Cathy Freeman
16	Todd Woodbridge and Tim Smith
