= Simon Reeve (Australian TV presenter) =

Australian television presenter

- Born: 6 September 1961 (age 65); Perth, Australia
- Occupations: Television presenter and news reporter

Simon Reeve (born 6 September 1961) is an Australian television presenter and journalist, best known for his association with the Seven Network.

Reeve was previously the sport presenter on Weekend Sunrise and the host of Million Dollar Minute and It's Academic.

== Career ==
Reeve began his career in 1979 at the Seven Network in Perth, Western Australia, where he worked as a sports producer and reporter. In 1982, he relocated to London to join Vis News. Returning to Australia in 1984, Reeve became part of the Western Australian current affairs program State Affair and contributed to the sports program What a Week. During this period, he earned a Penguin Award for a human interest report and participated as a commentator for TVW's host broadcast of the 1987 America's Cup defense. Later that year, he moved to the eastern states to work as a journalist on Beyond 2000.

Following his tenure on Beyond 2000, Reeve transitioned to other television programs, including Seasons in 1993, Wildlife in 1994, and Good Medicine, where he served as a reporter for three years. In 1999, Reeve relocated to Botswana with his family, founding Kwando Productions and co-producing the television series Mad Mike and Mark, which was aired internationally on Animal Planet. He returned to Australia in 2001 and subsequently hosted the quiz show QuizMaster in 2002, before joining Seven News and Sunrise.

Reeve was a regular fill-in presenter for Natalie Barr and Mark Beretta on Sunrise, including covering Barr's maternity leave in 2005. His responsibilities extended to presenting news from the APEC Newsroom in the lead-up to APEC 2007 and delivering the inaugural bulletin of the Seven Early News on 14 July 2008. He also served as a commentator for Seven's gymnastics coverage at the Athens and Beijing Olympic Games alongside Liz Chetkovich.

In 2005, Reeve took on hosting duties for the children's program It's Academic. The following year, he participated as a contestant on the reality singing show It Takes Two and began hosting the documentary series The Force: Behind the Line.

In January 2014, Reeve replaced Grant Denyer as the host of Million Dollar Minute. Later that year, he resigned from Weekend Sunrise after nine years to focus on hosting Million Dollar Minute and It's Academic. However, after the cancellation of Million Dollar Minute in 2015, Reeve returned to Weekend Sunrise. His final appearance on the program was in March 2020.

After nearly two decades of employment with the Seven Network, Reeve was made redundant in June 2020. Subsequently, he launched legal proceedings against the network, alleging unpaid entitlements, including annual leave and redundancy pay. The case centered on whether Reeve was classified as an employee or contractor. Seven filed a counterclaim seeking compensation for payments to Reeve's company should he win the lawsuit. After months of mediation, both parties reached a settlement in March 2021, with Seven's counterclaim dismissed. Despite his departure, Reeve's programs, including Million Dollar Minute, It's Academic, and The Force: Behind the Line, continue to air on the network.

== Personal life ==
Reeve is the son of renowned broadcaster and news presenter Earl Reeve, who had a prominent career with ABC Television in Perth during the mid to late 20th century.

Reeve's partner is Linda and together they have two children.

He is also an avid supporter of the Australian Football League club, Fremantle and once wrote for their website.

Media offices
Preceded by Kylie Gillies; Ryan Phelan	Weekend Sunrise; Sport presenter 2007–2014; 2015–2020	Succeeded by Ryan Phelan; Sally Bowrey
Preceded by Originator	Sunrise; Sydney correspondent 2010	Succeeded by Edwina Bartholomew
Preceded by Originator	Weekend Sunrise; News presenter 2005–2007	Succeeded by Talitha Cummins
Preceded by Grant Denyer	Million Dollar Minute; Host; 2014–2015	Succeeded by Program axed
Preceded by Various	It's Academic; Host; 2005–2016	Succeeded by Program axed
