= Million Dollar Minute =

Australian TV quiz show

- Genre: Quiz show
- Created by: Grant Rule & Riima Daher
- Presented by: Grant Denyer (2013); Simon Reeve (2014–2015)
- Country of origin: Australia
- Original language: English
- No. of seasons: 3
- No. of episodes: 468

Production
- Production locations: Global Television Studios; Southbank, Victoria
- Running time: 30 minutes (including commercials)

Original release
- Network: Seven Network
- Release: 16 September 2013 – 11 September 2015

Million Dollar Minute is an Australian quiz show which aired on the Seven Network. It premiered on 16 September 2013. The show was originally hosted by Grant Denyer, and later by Simon Reeve, and aired at 5:30 pm on weeknights. The show was cancelled in September 2015 and was replaced by The Chase Australia in its timeslot. Repeats are currently shown on 7two in place of Home and Away's Early Years on Hiatus.

== History ==
Million Dollar Minute was filmed at Global Television Studios in Melbourne in the same studio that was used for Deal or No Deal.

In November 2013 the original host, Grant Denyer resigned and was replaced by Weekend Sunrise sports presenter Simon Reeve for the 2014 series, with sound effects and themes also upgraded. It was announced on 30 August 2015 that the show would be axed after nearly two years, and replaced in its timeslot by The Chase Australia.

== Gameplay ==
The game is first played by three opposing contestants in a buzzer game played over four rounds. The contestants begin with 15 points each.

=== Round 1 ===
A series of six questions are asked and the first player to buzz in has a chance to answer. In the first series, more questions were often asked. A correct answer adds five points to the contestant's score, but an incorrect answer deducts five points from the score. It is possible for contestants to fall below zero—a negative score. After the questions, the contestant with the highest score is offered $2,000 of "safe money". The contestant is given five seconds to decide whether to take the money, which will drop their score down to the same as the contestant with the second highest score, or decline it. If two contestants are tied for the lead, the first contestant to buzz in during the five seconds wins the money and drops back to the contestant with the second highest score. If no contestant buzzes in during that five seconds, no safe money is given out. If all three contestants have the same score, no safe money is offered.

=== Viewer question ===
From March 2014, before the first commercial break, the presenter usually asks a question to the viewers and the answer is revealed after the break. In 2015, the viewer question varied between picture questions and multiple choice questions similar to the Million Dollar Minute. From July 2015, a viewer question would sometimes not occur.

=== Round 2 ===
The first question played in the second round is Snap Shot in which the contestants are given a visual multiple choice question. The category of the question is revealed with the three answer options and then the question related to an out of focus picture is asked. For some of the 2014 series, a category called "MDM News" was made in which, instead of an out of focus image, a newspaper heading is used. The picture with three parts is revealed one frame at a time. If no one answers, or a contestant buzzes in and chooses an incorrect option, the contestant is locked out and the next frame is revealed and so on until the last frame is revealed which focuses the picture. Only one answer per frame is accepted and if the full picture is revealed with no correct answer given then the game ends. It is possible for one contestant to win the game by default if the other two contestants both choose the incorrect answers on the first two frames, leaving the correct answer as the only option left. In the 2015 series, a version of Snap Shot known as "See It, Say It" was introduced. In this version, three pictures of something would make up the correct answer when said aloud from left to right. One picture is revealed at a time accompanied with a clue. Contestants can buzz in at any point of the question to answer. If no answer is given once all frames have been revealed and there are contestants not locked out, or all contestants guess incorrectly, the game is over. The contestant with the correct answer is given the choice of $1,500 in safe money or 15 points added to their score.

The gameplay then continues with the same buzzer game as the previous round. From the 2014 series, one of the questions asked in the second and third round presented a list of four multiple choice answers before the question was read out. After the round, safe money is offered again, this time $5,000.

=== Round 3 ===
Another set of six questions is asked in the buzzer game and then another Snap Shot question. This version of the round has three images as the options presented before the question is read out. Another version introduced in the 2015 series involves three images of something revealed one at a time, and contestants have to answer the question of what it is. The contestant with the correct answer is again offered $1,500 of safe money or 15 points. As with the previous Snap Shot, it is possible for a contestant to win it by default.

=== Double points decider ===
Questions are asked under a 90-second time limit, (60 seconds in the 2013 series), with correct answers now worth 10 points to the contestants' scores and an incorrect answer locking them out for the following question. When the time runs out the contestant with the highest score continues to answer the five "Million Dollar Minute" questions. If two contestants have the same score, another question is read out. The first contestant to buzz in and correctly answer it wins. If no one answers the question, another is read out until an answer is given.

=== "Million Dollar Minute" questions ===
In 60 seconds, the host reads out five multiple choice questions each with three answers. Each question would appear at 12-second intervals. In the last two seconds for each question, the answers on the contestant's touch screen begin to flash. The contestant must submit their answer during this two-second interval. Once all five questions are answered, five numbers which represent the contestant's choices are shown on a screen and checked one at a time in a random order. If all answers are correct, the contestant has won the jackpot. If any answer is incorrect, the contestant will play again in the following show's game for the same jackpot.

When the contestants have won, they can choose to walk away with the jackpot along with any accumulated safe money or they can decline the jackpot and return to play another game for a higher jackpot, similar of that of Sale of The Century. The "Million Dollar Minute" needed to be won nine times in order to win $1,000,000.

From January 2014, the $75,000 amount became a safe level. Any contestants who reach this point on their way to the million dollars is guaranteed to walk away with at least $75,000 in addition to any safe money earned during their time on the show.

From 17 November 2014, the prize ladder was altered to nine steps with the $300,000 amount becoming a safe level, along with the $75,000 safe level and a new $750,000 level, which was placed between the $500,000 and $1,000,000.

2013
Win	Prize
1	$20,000
2	$50,000
3	$75,000
4	$100,000
5	$200,000
6	$300,000
7	$500,000
8	$1 Million

Jan 2014 - Nov 14, 2014
Win	Prize
1	$20,000
2	$50,000
3	$75,000
4	$100,000
5	$200,000
6	$300,000
7	$500,000
8	$1 Million

Nov 17, 2014 - Sep 11, 2015
Win	Prize
1	$20,000
2	$50,000
3	$75,000
4	$100,000
5	$200,000
6	$300,000
7	$500,000
8	$750,000
9	$1 Million

== Notable winners ==
=== Top Prize Winner ===
- Andrew Skarbek – won $1,016,000 (including safe money) after correctly answering all "Million Dollar Minute" questions on his fifth attempt on 27 March 2015. He was the only millionaire on the show.

=== Other major winners ===
- Brydon Coverdale – won $307,000 (including safe money) after opting not to return to play for $500,000 on 4 March 2014. He became one of the "Chasers" on The Chase Australia where his nickname is "The Shark"; he also appeared on The Weakest Link in 2001 and Letters and Numbers in 2011.
- Pierre Sutcliffe – won $503,000 (including safe money) after opting not to return to play for $1,000,000 on 5 May 2014. He was a founding member of the Australian rock band Models.
- Lisa Paton – first contestant to play for $1,000,000. After two attempts, the then 38 year old single mum from Victoria lost her third buzzer game and left with $77,000 on 22 May 2014.
- Jonathan Maher – won $510,500 (including safe money) after opting not to return to play for $1,000,000 on 8 July 2014.
- Dougal Richardson – won $535,500 (including safe money) after opting not to return to play for $1,000,000 on 7 October 2014.
- Marc Vandenberg - won $315,500 (including safe money), the first contestant to play for $300,000 in the final round, on 4 December 2014 after the format change. He returned to lose the buzzer game.
- Michael Nunan – won $205,000 (including safe money) after opting not to return to play for $300,000 on 11 September 2015, the show's final episode.

== International versions ==
The show was broadcast in New Zealand from 30 June to 31 October 2014 on TV3. It aired on weekdays immediately before 3 News.

Country	Title	Broadcaster	Presenter(s)	Premiere	Finale
New Zealand	Million Dollar Minute	TV3	Simon Reeve	30 June 2014	26 July 2015
Vietnam	Một trăm triệu một phút (100 triệu 1 phút)	VTV3	Trấn Thành; Ngô Kiến Huy	26 July 2015	10 November 2024

== Special episodes ==
On 23 March 2014, 3AW's Ross Stevenson, John Burns and Tom Elliott competed in a special Sunday edition which was only aired in Melbourne and regional Victoria. All the money won went to the contestants' nominated charities. The Million Dollar Minute was played for $20,000 with each correct answer worth $4,000. Stevenson won the game and correctly answered all the questions earning $25,000 to his chosen charity.

On 3 May 2014, the Saturday night Footy Team played MDM. They were Mick Molloy, Samantha Lane & Matthew Richardson.

In July 2014, a special game broadcast on Sunrise across two days with the presenters David Koch, Samantha Armytage, and Natalie Barr playing against each other. The game was played for no money and the Snap Shots guaranteed 5 points. Armytage won the game but did not correctly answer all five questions in the Million Dollar Minute.

On 27 September 2014, three AFL players, Tim Watson, Wayne Carey and Cameron Ling, competed in a special 2014 AFL Grand Final episode in which all money won went to the Royal Children’s Hospital in Victoria. The Million Dollar Minute was played for $50,000 with each answer worth $10,000. Watson won the game and answered all five of the "Minute" questions, earning $60,000 from all three players.

On 13 April 2015, three teams from the sixth season of My Kitchen Rules (Jac and Shaz, Will and Steve, Ash and Camilla) appeared on the show with the money going to the charity of their choice. Ash and Camilla played the final round, winning $12,000 for their charity, having given away $3,000 of their safe money to Jac and Shaz who failed to pick up any safe money.

From 15 to 19 June 2015, a Champion of Champions tournament was broadcast across five days. Thirteen past contestants returned with three contestants playing against each other across three heats. The winner would have the chance to win $20,000 for themselves in the Million Dollar Minute and gain a place in the semi-final. The winner of the semi-final would have another chance to win $20,000. The semi-final featured the three contestants playing again with the two highest scorers gaining a place in the grand final against $1,000,000 winner Andrew Skarbek to become the People's Champ. The winner of the grand final would play for $100,000, with each correct answer worth $20,000, for a home viewer. Alex Dusek, Mike Brooks, and Jonathan Somic won their respective heats, and Dusek and Somic played in the grand final. Andrew Skarbek became the People's Champ and won the $100,000 for a home viewer.
