= The Daily Edition =

- Genre: Talk show
- Presented by: Sally Obermeder
- Country of origin: Australia
- Original language: English
- No. of seasons: 8
- No. of episodes: 1,000+

Production
- Producer: Sarah Stinson
- Production locations: Martin Place, Sydney, New South Wales
- Running time: 60 minutes

Original release
- Network: Seven Network
- Release: 17 June 2013 – 26 June 2020

Related
- The Morning Show

The Daily Edition was an Australian afternoon entertainment show on the Seven Network which was first broadcast on 17 June 2013 and ended on 26 June 2020. The show featured a combination of live breaking news, as well as live interviews with various personalities and entertainment updates, and aired between 2 pm and 3 pm on weekdays.

== History ==
The show premiered on Monday 17 June 2013 and initially aired from 3 pm to 4:30 pm with hosts Sally Obermeder, Monique Wright and Kris Smith.

In its first episode, retired newsreader Ian Ross was the first studio guest of the show and singer Robin Thicke was interviewed in a pre-recorded package. The first episode rated 71,000 across the metro audience, well behind rival program Nine News Now at 136,000 viewers. Its midnight replay was watched by 80,000 viewers. The second episode on 18 June rose to 90,000 viewers, closing the gap on the Nine Network's offering which rated 107,000 viewers. A midnight replay gathered 50,000 viewers.

On 19 August 2013, The Daily Edition was reduced to finish at 4 pm, due to Seven Afternoon News moving to 4 pm. However a week later, The Daily Edition moved to an earlier timeslot of 2 pm to 3 pm allowing the show to go live, instead of being prerecorded by 45 minutes. It stayed in this timeslot until the end of its run.

On 27 January 2014, The Daily Edition received new graphics and a new logo. In January 2015, Kris Smith resigned from the show to focus on his new fitness business. Monique Wright also left in the same year following her maternity leave and returned to focus on her co-hosting duties on Weekend Sunrise. In November 2016, Sarah Cumming took over from Sally Obermeder whilst she was on maternity leave with her second child by surrogate. She remained a permanent co-host upon Obermeder's return from maternity leave in September 2017, but left the show herself in November 2017. In December 2018, Tom Williams resigned from the Seven Network to pursue a career outside of television. Ryan Phelan replaced Williams as co-host from January 2019. The show received a new set in February 2020.

On 19 June 2020 it was announced that despite solid ratings, The Daily Edition would be canceled due to ongoing economic pressures at the Seven Network. Prior to the final episode going to air on 26 June 2020, Ryan Phelan was charged with assault occasioning actual bodily harm and common assault following a complaint made to police by his girlfriend. He was subsequently sacked by the Seven Network on 22 June 2020. Original co-host Tom Williams returned to co-host the final three episodes with Obermeder. The show's time slot was used for The Chase UK, which was already on Seven at 3 pm, since November 2013, beginning 29 June 2020.

== Presenters ==
Presenter	Role	Tenure
Sally Obermeder	Co-host	2013–2020
Ryan Phelan	Co-host	2016–2020
Tony Auden (Mondays–Wednesdays)	Weather	2016–2020
Kris Smith	Co-host	2013–2014
Monique Wright	Co-host	2013–2015
Tom Williams	Co-host	2013–2018, 2020
Jane Bunn (Thursdays and Fridays)	Weather	2016–2018
