= Saturday Disney =

Australian children's television program

- Saturday Disney title card used from 31 March 2012 to 24 September 2016
- Genre: Children's show
- Presented by: List of Presenters
- Country of origin: Australia
- Original language: English
- No. of series: 27
- No. of episodes: 1,366

Production
- Production locations: Brisbane, Queensland (1990–1997); Sydney, New South Wales (1997–2016)
- Running time: 120 minutes (1990–2012); 180 minutes (2012–2016) (incl. commercials)
- Production company: Buena Vista Television (1990–2000s)

Original release
- Network: Seven Network (1990–2016); 7TWO (2012–2016); 7flix (2016)
- Release: 27 January 1990 – 24 September 2016

Related
- Seven's Super Saturday

Saturday Disney is a long-running Australian children's television program which aired on the Seven Network in Australia for over 26 years, with the first episode going to air on 27 January 1990. The show was a television block which aired on Saturday mornings, consisting mainly of Disney television series dispersed between hosted content. The original presenters were Jeniene Mapp, James Sherry and Sofie Formica, and the final presenters were Nathan Morgan, Candice Dixon and Teigan Nash. Many hosts have gone on to achieve successful careers in Australian television.

On 5 September 2009, the show celebrated its 1,000th episode. The final episode aired on 24 September 2016.

== Hosts ==
Original Replacement Final

Role	Name	First show	Last show
Host	Sofie Formica	27 January 1990	October 1992
Host	Lisa Barry	October 1992	October 1997
Host	Melanie Symons	October 1997	19 October 2002
Host	Shae Brewster	19 October 2002	27 July 2013
Host	Teigan Nash	27 July 2013	24 September 2016
Host	Jeniene Mapp	27 January 1990	October 1996
Host	Shelley Craft	October 1996	6 July 2002
Host	Sara Groen	6 July 2002	28 January 2006
Host	Sally Stanton	21 January 2006	7 May 2011
Host	Candice Dixon	7 May 2011	24 September 2016
Host	James Sherry	27 January 1990	29 January 1994
Host	Marc Buhaj	5 February 1994	27 February 1999
Host	Tim McDonald	6 March 1999	29 January 2000
Host	Daniel Widdowson	5 February 2000	27 January 2007
Host	Jack Yabsley	20 January 2007	26 February 2011
Host	Nathan Morgan	26 February 2011	24 September 2016

Notes

- Saturday Disney had three hosts at any one time, always consisting of two females and one male.
- The presenters were also credited as segment producers, and they wrote and researched their own stories.
- The only exception of having more than three hosts on air at one time was whenever a co-host was leaving and their replacement was introduced on screen, either a number of weeks beforehand, or during the final episode of the co-host who was leaving.
- Shae Brewster was the longest-serving presenter in the history of the show. She hosted the show for three months short of eleven years.

Appearances by hosts after leaving the show

- Both Shelley Craft and Melanie Symons returned to the show as guests after their departures. Craft returned on 26 October 2002 to talk about her new hosting role on Perfect Match and via satellite on 29 October 2005 for the 800th episode. Symons returned on 2 August 2003 to promote Australia's Best Backyards.
- Several hosts have appeared after their departure through old footage. On the 999th episode on 29 August 2009, footage of every previous presenter who had been on the show was aired, looking back at the show's then 19-year history.
- Sally Stanton was interviewed by Teigan Nash on 2 May 2015 at the Cinderella red carpet event. Stanton was reporting for Event TV.
- Melanie Symons, Daniel Widdowson, Shae Brewster, Sally Stanton and Jack Yabsley featured as guests in the final episode which aired 24 September 2016. James Sherry also appeared via a video message.

== History ==
Part of the Seven Network's output deal and long-running relationship with Disney in the late 1980s was to adopt a local program to feature new animated series such as DuckTales mixed with local studio segments. This was part of an international franchise of programs in the global market to be named Disney Club, the Australian version being located in Brisbane. The producers of this version convinced Disney to allow them to use the Saturday Disney title to avert confusion with The Mickey Mouse Club, a title which seemed dated. The original set was designed to reflect Queensland architecture and make the viewers feel like they were visiting a friend's house on a Saturday morning. The set has since changed several times, the most recent set being introduced in February 2007. Saturday Disney was originally filmed at BTQ-7 from 1990 until 1997, when it moved to its new production base at ATN-7 in Sydney. It was originally produced by Buena Vista Television in conjunction with Seven.

On 5 September 2009, the show celebrated its 1,000th episode. The episode was filmed on location at Disneyland to celebrate. A week prior to this, footage of every previous host who had been on the show was aired, looking back at the show's then 19-year history.

Shae Brewster hosted her final episode on 27 July 2013, becoming the longest-serving host in the history of the program. She presented the show for three months short of eleven years, first joining in 2002.

The final episodes of Saturday Disney were filmed on 26 August 2016. TV Tonight reported that the show would be ending before the news was confirmed by a spokesperson for Seven. The final episode aired on 24 September 2016 and featured guest appearances by former presenters Melanie Symons, Daniel Widdowson, Shae Brewster, Sally Stanton and Jack Yabsley. James Sherry also appeared via a video message. David Knox of TV Tonight reported the cancellation of the program was the result of a "change in direction" under a new executive producer in charge of children's programming for Seven.

== Format ==
As a main feature, Saturday Disney originally included three Disney programs dispersed throughout the course of a two-hour episode. From 2012 to 2016, Saturday Disney featured five programs over the course of a three-hour episode. The programs shown regularly rotated around the schedule, and were a mixture of animated cartoons and live action comedies, which were more common after the premiere of Hannah Montana in 2007. There were three hosts of Saturday Disney, who lived in the 'Disney House' and introduced the programs along with performing other activities such as cooking, craft, science segments, interviews and special appearances by guests, usually celebrities, and occasionally live animals. Occasionally, the show was shot entirely on location, where the hosts explored certain cities such as Coffs Harbour or places such as Disneyland for the episode's entirety.

Feature stories produced by and starring the hosts were also included, which were usually articles about places, activities and events, interviews with celebrities or red carpet events. This format has been likened to magazine-style edu-tainment shows. In some stories, the hosts adapted certain characters used as a substitute for themselves presenting the article. Another type of story was the recurring mini-series, with the hosts acting as characters, which aired occasionally. Some recurring series from the past included Hazard Man (1990s), The Transfreezers (2000–2001), Tell Tale Trio (2002–2004) and the Secret Agents (2010–2011). A Page in Time (2006), introduced a style of serialised drama, depicting three children returning to the 1850s. More recent series such as Danger Island (2009), Race Around the Island (2010) and The Assistant (2014) took on the reality genre, parodying American series Survivor, The Amazing Race, and The Apprentice respectively.

A Double Dog Dare was featured in every episode, where each host took turns (one each week) to complete ridiculous, embarrassing or challenging tasks which upon failure may have resulted in the loser eating unusual foods as punishment. Ingredients were also regularly mixed in a blender. Ideas for dares and punishments were often sent in by viewers. This popular segment was a prominent feature of the show for many years.

Each week there was also a chosen Letter of the Week, which could be letters, drawings, or art sent in by viewers. Winners usually received many prizes, and the artwork was displayed around the set. Throughout the course of the program, emails from viewers were also read out.

== Time slot ==
The program's time slot since the show's inception in 1990 was always every Saturday from 7:00am until 9:00am on Seven unless there were interruptions by sporting or news events. Further Disney programming would continue to air after Saturday Disney.

From 4 September 1993 to 25 August 2001, Saturday Disney aired for an extra half-hour until 9:30am to include cartoons such as The New Adventures of Winnie the Pooh and The Little Mermaid, or C classified programming such as Crash Zone, Squiggle Vision and Science Court. However, the extra programme would be listed separately on TV guides and feature minimal hosted content.

On 4 July 2009, the show moved to the earlier time slot of 6:30am to 8:30am. However, the show returned to the previous time of 7:00am to 9:00am on 31 October 2009.

It was announced on 8 February 2010, that beginning 13 February 2010, the show would be moved to the later time slot of 9:00am to 11:00am, to make way for Weekend Sunrise.

It was announced on 17 March 2012 that, beginning 31 March 2012, the show would be moved to 7TWO and return to the original 7:00am to 9:00am time slot with a new look and logo, to make way for The Morning Show. On 12 May 2012, the regular length of Saturday Disney was extended to three hours with a time slot of 7:00am to 10:00am.

On 1 September 2012, Saturday Disney moved to the new time slot of 6:00am to 7:00am on Seven, then from 7:00am to 9:00am on 7TWO, the three hours now airing across both channels.

On 19 March 2016, the program's secondary channel changed from 7TWO to 7flix, airing from 6:00am to 7:00am on Seven, then from 7:00am to 9:00am on 7flix. The program remained in this slot until its final episode.

== Reception ==
At the time of its final episode, Saturday Disney was the twentieth-longest-running program in Australia, and the fifth-longest-running children's program in Australia.

=== Viewership ===
In 2005, Saturday Disney had an average of 196,000 viewers (in the 0–14 age group alone) and was the number-one-rating children's program on commercial television for people aged 0 to 14.

Saturday Disney was the fifth-highest-rating children's program on free television in 2006, averaging 274,425 viewers over 48 broadcasts. In 2008, the program's yearly average viewing audience had ballooned to 395,000 (combining metro and regional audiences), ranking as the eighth-most-watched children's program. Saturday Disney ranked as the fourth-highest-rating children's program in 2009, averaging 368,000 viewers across both metro and regional audiences over 48 weeks.

However, the final episode on 24 September 2016 was comparatively only watched by 41,000 on Seven (6:00am to 7:00am) and 24,000 on 7flix (7:00am to 9:00am).

=== Awards ===
On 18 March 2012, Saturday Disney was announced as a nominee for the 2012 Most Outstanding Children's Program Logie Award. The ceremony took place on 15 April 2012, and the award was presented by former Saturday Disney host Shelley Craft with Sam Moran. The nomination package featured footage from the episode which aired 13 August 2011, in which the hosts visited the Northern Territory. ABC3's My Place won the award.

List of awards and nominations received by Saturday Disney
Award	Year	Recipient(s) and nominee(s)	Category	Result	Ref.
Logie Award	2012	Saturday Disney	Most Outstanding Children's Program	Nominated	
TV Tonight Awards	2014	Saturday Disney	Best Kid's Show	Nominated	

== Programming ==
1990s

- The Adventures of Mickey & Donald
- Adventures of the Gummi Bears
- Aladdin
- Bonkers
- Chip 'n Dale Rescue Rangers
- Darkwing Duck
- Doug
- DuckTales
- Goof Troop
- Jungle Cubs
- The Little Mermaid
- Marsupilami
- The Mighty Ducks
- The New Adventures of Winnie the Pooh
- Nightmare Ned
- Pepper Ann
- Quack Pack
- Raw Toonage
- Recess
- Science Court
- Squiggle Vision
- TaleSpin
- Timon & Pumbaa
- The Wuzzles

2000s

- 101 Dalmatians: The Series
- American Dragon: Jake Long
- Brandy & Mr. Whiskers
- Buzz Lightyear of Star Command
- The Buzz on Maggie
- Crash Zone
- Dave the Barbarian
- The Emperor's New School
- Fillmore!
- Hannah Montana
- Hercules
- House of Mouse
- JONAS
- Kim Possible
- The Legend of Tarzan
- Lilo & Stitch: The Series
- Lloyd in Space
- Mickey Mouse Works
- PB&J Otter
- Phineas and Ferb
- The Proud Family
- The Replacements
- Sabrina
- Teacher's Pet
- Teamo Supremo
- The Weekenders
- Wizards of Waverly Place

2010s

- A.N.T. Farm
- Art Attack
- Austin & Ally
- Crash & Bernstein
- Dog with a Blog
- Fish Hooks
- Gravity Falls
- Good Luck Charlie
- I Didn't Do It
- I'm in the Band
- Jake and the Never Land Pirates
- Jessie
- Jonas Brothers: Living the Dream
- Kick Buttowski: Suburban Daredevil
- Kickin' It
- Kirby Buckets
- Lab Rats
- Liv and Maddie
- Mighty Med
- Pair of Kings
- Penn Zero: Part-Time Hero
- PrankStars
- Randy Cunningham: 9th Grade Ninja
- Shake it Up
- Sonny with a Chance
- So Random!
- Ultimate Spider-Man
- Wander Over Yonder
- Win, Lose or Draw
- Zeke and Luther

== See also ==
- List of longest-running Australian television series
