= Sarah Cumming =

Australian journalist

Sarah Cumming is an Australian journalist.

== Career ==
Cumming completed her Journalism degree at the University of South Australia, where she majored in International Relations. She covered many stories and gained a wealth of experience at a number of places including Southern Cross Ten in Canberra, DMG Regional Radio in North Queensland. She was also a general news reporter and fill in presenter on Seven News Adelaide and she was a part of the news team at Nova 91.9 Adelaide.

In 2007, Cumming moved to Sydney to work as a reporter for Seven News, where she was a fill in weather presenter for Sara Groen and covered for Natalie Barr on Sunrise.

In February 2010, Cumming was appointed as Saturday news presenter on Weekend Sunrise she however left this position due to becoming a weather presenter on Seven News Sydney.

In November 2010, it was announced that Cumming would replace Sara Groen as weather presenter on Seven News Sydney. She started on 29 November 2010. She remained in this role until taking maternity leave towards the end of 2015, and she was replaced by David Brown.

In November 2017, Cumming resigned from the Seven Network after 13 years with the network.

Cumming has been a regular fill-in presenter on The Morning Show, The Daily Edition and a fill-in news presenter on Weekend Sunrise.

Sarah worked as a journalist and features reporter at ABC Gold Coast from 2019 to 2025.

In February 2026, she returned to Adelaide and rejoined the Seven Network as a reporter and presenter for Seven News Adelaide.

== Personal life ==
Cumming is married to former AFL player Stuart Dew and they have two children.
