= Tom Williams (presenter) =

Australian television personality and radio presenter

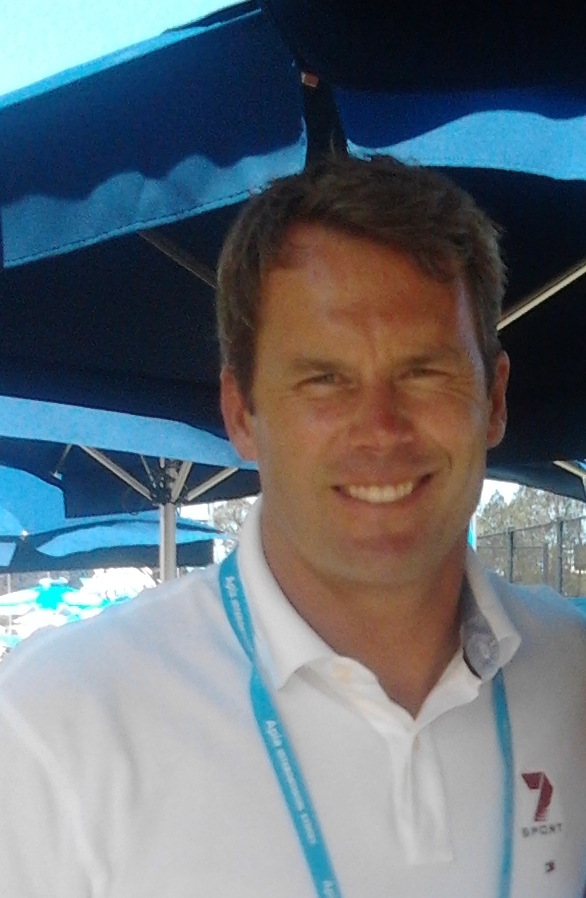
- Williams at the 2013 APIA International
- Born: 16 October 1970 (age 56); Sydney, Australia
- Occupations: Television and radio presenter
- Years active: 2000–present

Thomas Williams (born 16 October 1970, in Sydney) is an Australian television personality and radio presenter.

Williams had previously been a co-host of The Daily Edition and a long-time presenter for the Seven Sport team.

== Career ==
Williams graduated from the Jesuit St Aloysius' College and worked as a construction worker, model and competed in surf lifesaving championships. One of Williams' first appearances on television was in the video clip of Melissa Tkautz's debut song "Read My Lips".

The turning point in Williams' life occurred in 2000, when he phoned into a radio show hosted by comic duo Merrick & Rosso. His style interested them so much that he was given a regular segment on the show, which eventually led to an on-air role as a builder on the Seven Network renovation show Room for Improvement. This was followed by a stint as a presenter on long-running travel show The Great Outdoors in mid-2001.

Williams would go on to host, present or participate in a number of programs during the 2000s for Seven. Williams appeared on a celebrity special of The Weakest Link in which he was voted off in the first round. In 2005, Williams hosted the fifth season of The Mole – The Amazing Game; however some fans called for the return of former host, Grant Bowler. With the new series, Williams brought the concept of live eliminations, from the Seven Network's Martin Place studios in Sydney.

In 2005, Williams was one of several Seven Network celebrities who starred in Dancing with the Stars. In the show's finale, Williams danced shirtless with partner Kym Johnson and he was voted the winner. During his time at The Great Outdoors and over the course of the series Williams emerged as sex symbol.

He joined Seven Sport in 2008 as a roving reporter for the 2008 Beijing Olympics and would continue in this role to date, showcasing the colour and features at other network events including the Australian Open. In April 2009, Williams relieved as sport presenter on Nova 96.9 during Merrick & Rosso with Kate Ritchie, whilst Marto was having surgery.

In 2010, Williams co-hosted Australia's Greatest Athlete with Mark Beretta on the Seven Network and also co-hosted No Leave, No Life with Rachel Finch. In March 2011, Williams joined Classic Rock FM presenting Saturday mornings with Kate Mac. In June 2013, Williams was announced as co-host of a new afternoon entertainment program, The Daily Edition alongside Sally Obermeder, Kris Smith and Monique Wright.

In December 2018, Williams announced his resignation from the Seven Network. He switched careers to real estate in 2019. After six months at LJ Hooker Avnu, Williams quit the Mosman estate agency.

In 2020, Williams appeared in the sixth season of the Australian version of I'm a Celebrity...Get Me Out of Here!. In June, Williams briefly returned to the Seven Network to present the final three episodes of The Daily Edition following Ryan Phelan's dismissal from the network.

Williams has also been a regular contributor to entertainment and lifestyle website Live4 since 2012.

Since 2020, Williams has been an operating partner of Australian property technology company Asset Reports.

In February 2021, it was announced Williams is a contestant on Seven's Dancing with the Stars: All Stars.

== Television ==
- Room for Improvement
- The Great Outdoors (2001) as Presenter
- The Weakest Link (celebrity TV special) as Contestant
- The Mole (2005) as Host
- Dancing with the Stars (2005) as Contestant
- Seven Sport (2008-current) as Roving reporter
- Australia's Greatest Athlete (2010) as Co-host
- No Leave, No Life (2010) as Co-host
- The Daily Edition (2013) as Co-host
- I'm a Celebrity...Get Me Out of Here! (2020) as Contestant (Season 6)
- The Daily Edition (2020) as Presenter (3 final episodes)
- Dancing with the Stars: All Stars (2021) as Contestant

== Radio ==
- Nova 96.9 (2009) as Sport presenter (during Merrick & Rosso)
- Classic Rock FM (2011) as Co-host

== Personal life ==
In February 2012, Williams announced his engagement to fashion designer Rachel Gilbert.

In July 2013, Williams announced on The Daily Edition that his wife Rachel was pregnant with their first child. On 8 January 2014, Rachel gave birth to a daughter.

Preceded by Bec Hewitt & Michael Miziner	Dancing with the Stars (Australia); Winner; Season 2 (Early 2005 with Kym Johnson)	Succeeded by Ada Nicodemou & Aric Yegudkin
Preceded by Mike Hammond	Gladiators; Host (with Zoe Naylor); 2008	Succeeded by incumbent
Preceded by Andrew Voss; Michael Slater	Australia's Greatest Athlete; Host (with Mark Beretta); 2010	Succeeded by Wendell Sailor
Preceded by Grant Bowler	The Mole; Host; 2005	Succeeded by Shura Taft
