= Mel Symons =

Australian media personality

- Born: Melanie Symons; 1975 (age 50–51); Byron Bay, New South Wales, Australia
- Occupation: Media personality
- Years active: 1994−present
- Notable credit(s): Totally Wild (1994–1996); Saturday Disney (1997–2002); Ground Force (2002–2005); Sydney Weekender (2004–present)

Melanie Symons (born 1975) is an Australian media personality, who is best known for appearing on a number of television shows on the Seven Network, most notably Saturday Disney from 1997 until 2002, and Ground Force from 2002 until 2005.

Symons began her career on Network Ten's Totally Wild in 1994 as a reporter. In 1997 she moved to the Seven Network's children's television show Saturday Disney, where she hosted for five years. In April 2002 she began presenting on the Australian version of the backyard renovation show Ground Force as the "bargain hunter". In 2003 Symons also presented her own lifestyle program Australia's Best Backyards, and co-hosted Wheel of Fortune as a fill-in for two weeks.

She hosted the first fashion segments on the Sunrise breakfast program and also appears on The Morning Show. For over ten years she has been presenter for Sydney Weekender, a local travel program that shows viewers the best places to go and things to do across New South Wales.

== Television roles ==
Year	Title	Role	Notes
1994–1997	Totally Wild	Reporter	
1997–2002	Saturday Disney	Co-host	One of the longest serving hosts of Saturday Disney
2002–2005	Ground Force	Bargain Hunter	First prime time role
2003	Australia's Best Backyards	Host	
2003	Wheel Of Fortune	Co-host	Temporary fill in for two weeks during 2003, also a contestant
2002–present	Sydney Weekender	Presenter	Has presented over a decade of content
2005–2007	Sunrise	Fashion reporter	Created the first fashion editorials
