= Chris Reason =

Australian journalist (born 1965)

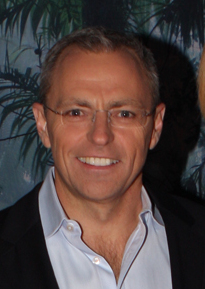
- Reason in 2012
- Born: 1 October 1965 (age 61); Australia
- Occupations: Journalist; news presenter
- Employer: Seven Network
- Spouse: Kathryn Robinson
- Children: 2

Chris Reason (born 1 October 1965) is a journalist, foreign correspondent and news anchor for the Seven Network Australia.

He has been with the network for more than three decades, starting as Crime Reporter at Channel Seven in Brisbane in 1990 and going on to serve as European correspondent, then London bureau chief, and is today the network’s chief reporter.

He has won six Walkley Awards, two Logies, numerous Kennedy Awards and the Graham Perkin ‘Australian Journalist of the Year Award’. It was the first of three times he was a finalist as “Australian Journalist of the Year”.

Reason has reported on a range of national and international news events including the September 11 terror attacks, the 7/7 London bombings, the Boxing Day tsunami and the Fukushima nuclear disaster. He’s covered the wars in Bosnia, Afghanistan, Lebanon, Ukraine and Gaza (winning Walkleys for both Ukraine and Gaza) and was also dispatched to cover the deaths of Nelson Mandela, Princess Diana and Queen Elizabeth II; the elections of Barack Obama and Donald Trump; the coronation of King Charles; and the transitions of four Popes – John Paul II, Benedict, Francis and Leo.

Back home, he has reported on the Thredbo landslide tragedy, the Beaconsfield mine collapse, Brisbane’s 2011 floods, Victoria’s Black Saturday bushfires and most famously, the Lindt Cafe siege from the Channel 7 newsroom across the street in December 2014. He also won the Walkley for Investigative Journalism for his four-year inquiry into allegations of sex abuse surrounding the former Bishop of Broome Christopher Saunders.

Reason has covered 12 Summer and Winter Olympic Games and in 2022 was awarded the prestigious Harry Gordon Memorial Prize for Olympic Reporting -- the only television journalist to do so.

He's previously hosted all of Seven’s major news programs including Sunrise, Weekend Sunrise, the Morning and Afternoon News and the flagship 6PM bulletin.

== Career ==
In 1986, after undertaking work experience with The Redland Times he was offered his first fulltime reporting role, while finishing a Bachelor of Arts.

He moved to the Brisbane metropolitan newspaper The Daily Sun, as Crime Reporter in 1987. He then moved to television in 1989, accepting a job with QTQ Channel Nine Brisbane as Gold Coast reporter. In 1990 he moved to BTQ Channel Seven Brisbane as Crime Reporter.

During his first year at Seven News he unwittingly covered a segment now infamously known as the Democracy Manifest video, which became an Internet viral video years later. In 2019, The Guardian called it "perhaps the pre-eminent Australian meme of the past 10 years".

In 1992, Reason was posted to London as Seven’s European Correspondent. A year later he was made London Bureau Chief. In four years in the Bureau, he covered the ongoing conflicts in Israel, Bosnia and Northern Ireland, and the collapse of the marriage of Prince Charles and Princess Diana. He also covered the 1993 Ashes Cricket Tour, 1995 Rugby League World Cup and the 1996 Atlanta Olympics.

In 1996, he returned to the Seven Sydney newsroom as Network Correspondent.

In 2002, he was announced as co-host of the re-launched national breakfast program Sunrise alongside Melissa Doyle. But in September, Reason was diagnosed with cancer and forced to retire from the program while he underwent six months of chemotherapy, surgery and recovery care. He was replaced by David Koch. The cancer was an abdominal metastasis of the testicular cancer he had fought four years earlier. Reason had missed a critical health check-up in 2001 while covering the 11 September terror attacks in the United States, and he says it almost cost him his life. In multiple interviews since, he has warned young men to never miss a health check-up.

In 2003, after his recovery, Reason had multiple roles—first as presenter of Seven Morning News, and then presenter of Sunday Sunrise in 2004. In 2005, he was named co-host of Weekend Sunrise alongside Lisa Wilkinson, but he was later replaced by Deal or No Deal host Andrew O'Keefe. Reason then returned to full-time reporting.

In 2014, Reason covered the Lindt Café siege, which occurred directly opposite the Seven’s Sydney newsroom in Martin Place. The offices were evacuated by Police, but senior cameraman Greg Parker and then Reason were allowed back inside the building to sit beside the police sniper position and report on the unfolding siege. They were the only news crew in the country allowed beyond police lines.

The coverage earned Reason all four of Australia's top journalism prizes - the Walkley, Kennedy, Logie and the Graham Perkin ‘Australian Journalist of the Year’.

In December 2025, one day short of the 11 year anniversary of his famous coverage of the Lindt Cafe siege, Reason was the first Australian free-to-air news reporter to arrive at the scene following the 2025 Bondi Beach terror attack, and was brought to tears by an interview with a bloodied survivor of the attack.

== Personal life ==
Reason attended Villanova College in the Brisbane suburb of Coorparoo and the University of Queensland (BA). He married journalist Kathryn Robinson in 2005. They became parents to twins in 2007. His father died from brain cancer in 2006.
