= Kris Smith =

English Australian model, television presenter and former rugby league footballer

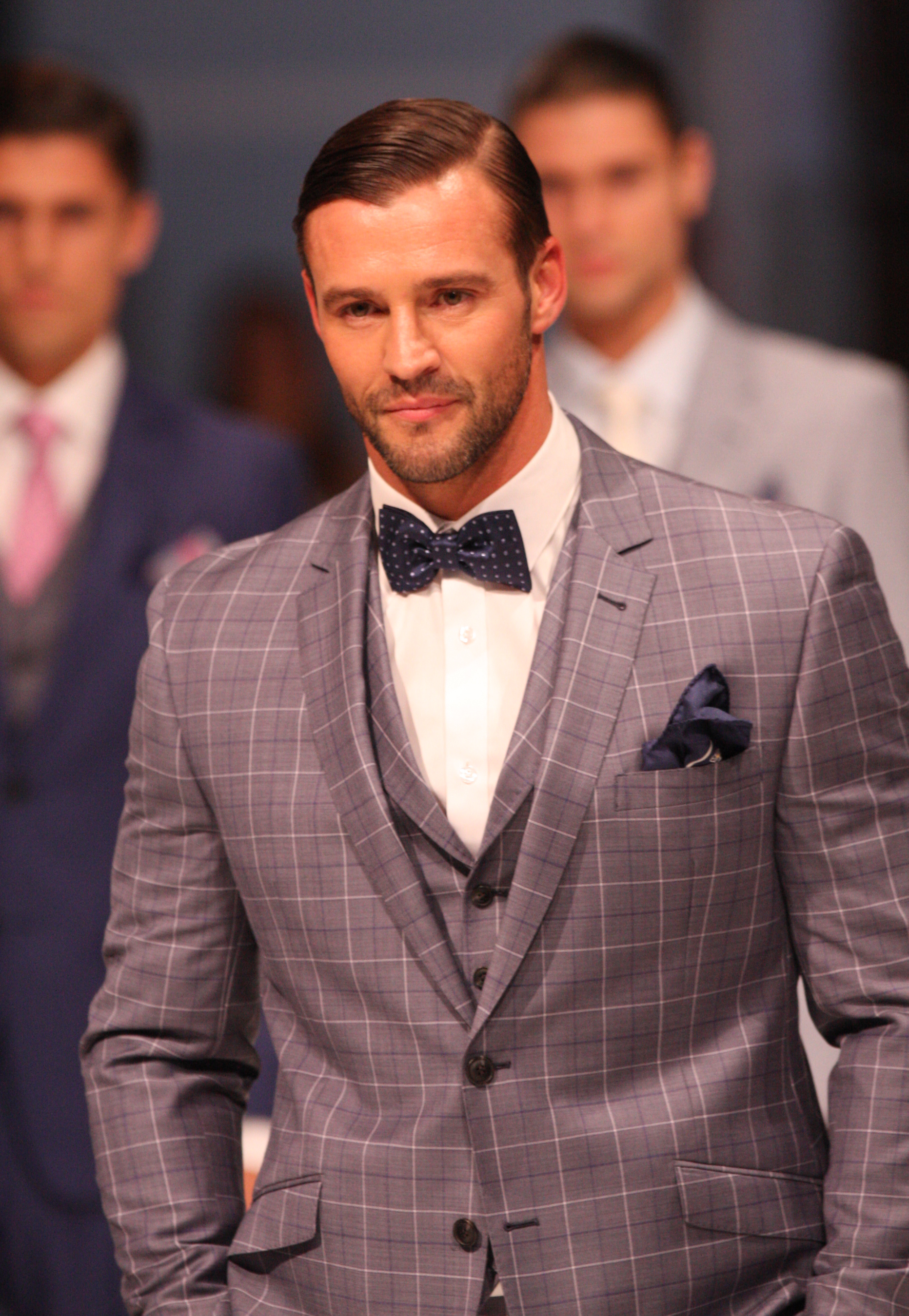
- Smith in 2015
- Born: 20 August 1978 (age 48); Salford, Greater Manchester, England
- Occupations: Presenter, model, rugby league player
- Years active: 2008–present
- Spouse: Sarah Boulazeris (m. 2022)
- Partner: Dannii Minogue (2008–2012)
- Children: 3
- Rugby league career

Playing information
- Position: Second-row, Loose forward
Club
Years	Team	Pld	T	G	FG	P
1998–2000	Leeds Rhinos	0	0	0	0	0
1998–1999	→ Bramley (loan)	22	2	55	0	118
2001	Halifax Blue Sox	1	0	0	0	0
2001	London Broncos	1	0	0	0	0
2003–06	Swinton Lions	71	12	33	0	114
2007	Oldham	10	5	0	0	20
	Total	105	19	88	0	252
- As of 22 May 2021

Kris Smith (born 20 August 1978) is an English Australian model, television presenter and former professional rugby league player.

== Career ==
=== Rugby league ===
In England, Smith played for a number of British Super League clubs including the Leeds Rhinos, London Broncos, Halifax Blue Sox, Salford Red Devils, Oldham Roughyeds and Swinton Lions.

=== Modelling ===
Smith has worked extensively as a model after he was signed to an agency in the United Kingdom following his retirement from rugby league.

Following his move to Australia in 2008, he was signed as a Myer ambassador - a contract that has subsequently been renewed several times.

=== Television ===
In 2010, Smith was announced as the new co-host of FOX8 reality series Football Superstar replacing Brian McFadden.

Smith was one of the celebrity contestants to compete on the first episode of Celebrity Come Dine With Me Australia on Lifestyle. Smith competed against Josh Thomas, Chloe Maxwell and Prue MacSween on the episode which aired in December 2012.

Throughout 2012 and 2013, Smith was a regular contributor to Network Ten's discussion program Can of Worms.

In June 2013, Smith was announced as one of the four original presenters of the Seven Network's new early afternoon infotainment program The Daily Edition, hosting the show alongside Tom Williams, Monique Wright and Sally Obermeder. Smith continued in this role until it was announced he would be scaling back his commitments to the program from January 2015.

It was revealed in January 2017 that Smith would be one of the contestants to compete on the third series of Network Ten reality series, I'm a Celebrity...Get Me Out of Here!. Smith was the fourth celebrity to be eliminated from the competition. His nominated charity was White Ribbon Australia, having revealed on the show he was once the victim of domestic violence.

Smith guest hosted Network Ten lifestyle program The Living Room in 2018. Also that year, he was one of the celebrities who took part in the Seven Network's The Real Full Monty. In early 2019, it was reported that Smith had teamed up with three of his The Real Full Monty castmates (Shane Jacobson, Todd McKenney and Brian Taylor) to film a new travel comedy show for the Seven Network called Mates on a Mission.

In August 2019, Smith appeared on a celebrity edition of The Chase Australia alongside Lisa Curry, Brendan Jones and Ricki-Lee Coulter. The team managed to achieve a collective total of $47,000 during the first four rounds for their respective charities, but lost the money when they were beaten by The Chaser, Matt Parkinson in the "Final Chase". Smith was representing Challenge.

== Personal life ==
Smith has had a number of highly publicised relationships, including with performer Dannii Minogue, with model and nutritionist Maddy King, and with personal trainer and former Australia's Next Top Model contestant, Sarah Boulazeris.

He has one son with Minogue, born in 2010, and two daughters with Boulazeris, born in 2018 and 2019.

Smith suffers from osteoarthritis and will need to have titanium knee replacements fitted in the future.

Smith is also known for his involvement with a number of charitable organisations and causes.
