= The NightCap =

Australian television series

- Created by: Adam Boland
- Directed by: Paul Slater
- Presented by: Matt White; Jessica Rowe; Monique Wright; Paul Murray
- Country of origin: Australia

Production
- Running time: Approx 60 minutes (including commercials)

Original release
- Network: 7HD
- Release: 12 February – 13 March 2008

The NightCap was an Australian television talk show broadcast on 7HD. It was the first Australian television program to be produced exclusively for an HDTV multichannel. The show began broadcasting on 12 February 2008 and screened every Tuesday and Thursday night at 10.30pm. It was cancelled after the Easter 2008 television non-ratings period. According to producer Adam Boland, he NightCap was a late night panel show that would cover news in an 'unconventional' way.

== The Panel ==
The show was hosted by Seven News sports anchor Matt White alongside a panel that included former Ten News and Today host Jessica Rowe, former Sunrise weather presenter Monique Wright and Triple M radio host Paul Murray. The show was created by Adam Boland, who was an executive producer for Sunrise and The Morning Show on the Seven Network. Comparing him to American filmmaker Michael Moore, Boland described Paul Murray as a 'sharp tongue', 'right-viewed' shock jock. Unlike Paul, her views were passionately to the left in which she ' wears her heart on her sleeve'. Monique Wright was the third panelists who was 'savvy' and 'super smart' who could talk about anything, making her invaluable on a panel. As his role as the moderator who would steer the conversation, Matt White was one of the 'slickest presenters' on television Boland believed. The final panelist was former Big Brother contestant Big Brother housemate Zach Douglas who was 'flamboyant', 'street smart', 'unpredictable' but still 'naïve'. Other than Adam Boland, the production team wasn't so supportive about Douglas' appointment with Rob McKnight telling Boland, "Sometimes you let your groin get in the way of your decisions.." and Zach was one of these 'groin decisions'. The NightCap would be aimed at a younger demographic and he felt Douglas could help get them traction.

== The Debut ==
The NightCap was a produced by the Sunrise staff, 'for free'. As with The Morning Show, Boland's mind was again caught in a 'spiral' on the eve of the debut. The classification for the show was unique in itself. American crooner, Beau, walked in the shot and put everybody on notice. His role was of that of Jono Coleman on Studio Ten- the Voiceover guy with a difference. As the show was on 7HD, the ratings were never collected so no one really knows how this show rated. It was also broadcast live on Yahoo! The show took talk-back calls and rad out emails as they came in, and web-cams ere set up around the studio so the panel was viewed from several angles. It had different content and a very different style- Ten's The Project wasn't on air yet.

== Ask Zach and Controversy ==
After the first week, two episodes, it was clear to Boland that Zach's contribution was limited and could only talk about fashion and gossip. Boland's attempts to give him a bigger role blew up in [his] face... . The new segment called 'Ask Zach', which obviously inspired Ask Ita on Studio 10, allowed viewers to submit personal problems for Zach's honest. The first one was about sex, and he replied very controversially.

Openly gay former Big Brother housemate Zach Douglas was reportedly removed from the original line up of panelists after offering explicit advice on oral sex and same-sex practices during an episode which aired on 19 February 2008. A spokeswoman for Seven claims there was "no correlation between the incident" and Douglas' removal from the line up, and that Douglas would remain on the show as an entertainment reporter. Douglas himself reiterated that he wasn't fired and preferred his new role. A different guest panelist replaced Douglas' spot for each episode thereafter. A permanent replacement was intended to be appointed before the show was axed.

== See also ==
- List of Australian television series
