= Meet the Press (Australian TV program) =

1992–2013 Australian TV series

- Logo from 2013
- Genre: Sunday morning talk show Politics, News
- Presented by: Kathryn Robinson (2013); Paul Bongiorno (1996–2012); Hugh Riminton (2010–2012); Deborah Knight (2000–2009); David Johnston (1992–1996)
- Country of origin: Australia
- Original language: English
- No. of seasons: 22
- No. of episodes: 1,000+

Production
- Production locations: Sydney, New South Wales (1992–2011, 2013); Melbourne, Victoria (2012)
- Running time: 30 minutes (1992–2012); 60 minutes (2013)

Original release
- Network: Network Ten
- Release: 23 October 1992 – 24 November 2013

Related
- Ten Eyewitness News

Meet the Press is an Australian Sunday morning talk show focused on the national political agenda, as well as other news, sport and lifestyle issues. It aired from 1992 to 2013 on Network Ten.

== History ==
Meet the Press was originally a radio and television simulcast between 3DB and HSV-7 in Melbourne. It commenced in 1957, the very early days of television, well before the simultaneous national broadcasting of programs was possible. The original moderator was Herald and Weekly Times journalist Frederick Howard. (The HWT then owned both 3DB and HSV-7.) The radio version was somewhat short-lived but the television program lasted for some time.

Network Ten version of the program was hosted by former Network Ten news presenter Kathryn Robinson and aired on Sunday mornings at 10:30 am. It ran from October 1992. The program's first guest was the then prime minister, Paul Keating.

As a Sunday morning talk show, usually the format included two guests – a politician and a guest who might be a politician or industry expert. A panel of two journalists joined the presenter to question the guests on the week's political issues and news.

Prior to 2013 the Parliament House bureau chief and political editor Paul Bongiorno shared the presenting role with Hugh Riminton on alternate weeks.

From the show's beginning in 1992 until the end of 2011, the show and production was based at Sydney's Studios. In 2012, the studio production moved to the Networks Melbourne Studios ATV10 and with the change in format, production moved back to Sydney in the Fox Sports studio (owned by producer News Limited).

David Johnston was the original host of the program until Paul Bongiorno replaced him in 1996. Former Ten Eyewitness News Sydney presenter Deborah Knight shared the presenting role with Bongiorno from 2000 until 2009.

In 2010, Ten News's senior political correspondent, Hugh Riminton, joined the program to share the presenting role with Bongiorno.

In 2013, former Network Ten Breakfast news presenter Kathryn Robinson was announced as the new host of the show.

In 2014, the show was put on hiatus and has not returned.

== Logos ==
Logo used until 4 December 2011

Logo used from 5 February 2012 – 2 December 2012

== See also ==
- The Bolt Report
- List of Australian television series
- List of longest-running Australian television series
