= Glenn Wheeler =

- Born: 21 April 1960 (age 66); Sydney, New South Wales, Australia
- Occupations: Journalist; Radio presenter; Television presenter
- Years active: 2002–2015
- Employer(s): 2GB and Seven Network

Glenn Wheeler OAM (born 21 April 1960) is an Australian media personality and former radio and television presenter.

== Career ==
After working in sales and marketing for many years, doing master of ceremonies work on the side, Wheeler joined Sydney radio station 2GB in 2002 as the weekend midnight to dawn presenter. He then presented Saturday Nights on 2GB, the Travel Show on 2GB on Sunday mornings, and the 2CH Breakfast Show from Monday to Saturday.

In 2007, Wheeler joined The Morning Show, which screens nationwide on the Seven Network, as an infomercial presenter. He remained with the show until his 2015 accident.

== Personal life ==
Wheeler is married to Michelle and they have three adult children.

On 1 February 2015, Wheeler was involved in a motor scooter accident in the southern Sydney suburb of Woolooware. He had "a severed artery in one leg and other significant injuries to various parts of his body", including "some bleeding on the brain." He was airlifted to St George Hospital and placed in an induced coma. On 2 February Wheeler underwent surgery on his pelvis and leg. His condition afterwards was described as "stable". In August 2015 it was reported that he had been "recovering in a brain rehab unit for several months", which he has since left. As of 2021 he resides in a care home in Sylvania, New South Wales.

In 2021 he was awarded the Order of Australia Medal for his media career and charity work.
