= Nuala Hafner =

Australian media personality and television presenter

- Born: London, England, UK
- Occupation: Australian media personality
- Parent: Dorinda Hafner (mother)

Nuala Hafner is an Australian media personality of Ghanaian descent, best known as a newsreader, TV host/presenter, weather presenter and journalist. She is also a psychologist.

== Early life and education ==
Hafner was born in London, England, to Ghanaian-born Australian Dorinda Hafner. Her parents met in England, where her father, Julian, was a psychiatrist, and migrated to Adelaide in 1977, where Nuala was raised. The couple subsequently split up.

She attended Adelaide's Pembroke School, Adelaide, where she was dux of her year before travelling to the UK and Europe. She taught drama in London till 1995. She completed a Bachelor of Arts and Bachelor of Laws at Flinders University in 2000 and was admitted to the bar.

== Television career ==
Hafner began her media career at the age of three months when she appeared in an advertisement for baby formula. She also starred in children's program The Book Place, and on Seven Adelaide's lifestyle program Discover.

Hafner joined Seven News Sydney in April 2003. She presented the weather and Canberra bulletins until she left on 22 December 2006 to work overseas, filing reports from Seven's London Bureau. In 2008, she took another role, appearing on Sunrise, Weekend Sunrise and the Seven HD show The NightCap.

In July 2013, Hafner was appointed as Melbourne news presenter for Network Ten's new breakfast show Wake Up hosted in Sydney by Natarsha Belling and James Mathison. By November 2013, the programme lost 50% of its audience share and rated lower than Breakfast, which was axed the year before due to low ratings.

== Other qualifications and roles ==
Hafner studied drama at Flinders University and occasionally acts on stage. She continued her studies in psychology during her television career, for which she was awarded the Capstone Prize, and completed a Master of Clinical Psychology.
