= Sara Groen =

Australian actress and television presenter

- Occupations: Actress; Television Presenter
- Years active: 2004–2010

Sara Groen (born 6 March 1981) is an Australian actress and television presenter.

== Early life and education ==
Groen was born in Perth, Western Australia. She grew up on the Gold Coast, Queensland, where she developed a passion for sports of all kinds including soccer, touch football and swimming. She attended Somerset College and graduated in 1998. She also studyied at Bond University in Queensland.

== Career ==
Groen appeared in her first screen role in a 1999 episode of BeastMaster alongside future Lost star Emilie de Ravin and Hotel Babylon star Natalie Jackson Mendoza.

She appeared in an episode of The Lost World in 2001, followed by an episode in Farscape a year later. In that same year, 2002, she became a co-presenter on the weekend children's program, Saturday Disney. In 2004, she played a part in an Australian short-film The Scree, co-starring with Paul McDermott.

Sara joined the Beyond Tomorrow team in 2006. From 2007 to 2009, Sara was the weather presenter for Seven News in Sydney, replacing Nuala Hafner who left in late 2006. From October 2007 she began filling in on Seven Late News.

In October 2009, Sara filled in for Matt White on Today Tonight.

Groen has also appeared as a spokesperson in a TV commercial for Headspace, a youth mental health service.

Sara was also a contestant in Series 3 of It Takes Two. She was voted off at the end of week 6.

In October 2010, Groen announced that she would be leaving the Seven Network to move to Melbourne. She finished in November and was replaced by Sarah Cumming.

In April 2011, Sara joined Seven News Melbourne as a fill-in weather presenter if David Brown is away.

== Personal life ==
In May 2011, Groen announced that she was three months pregnant with her first child.
