= Kathryn Robinson (journalist) =

Australian journalist

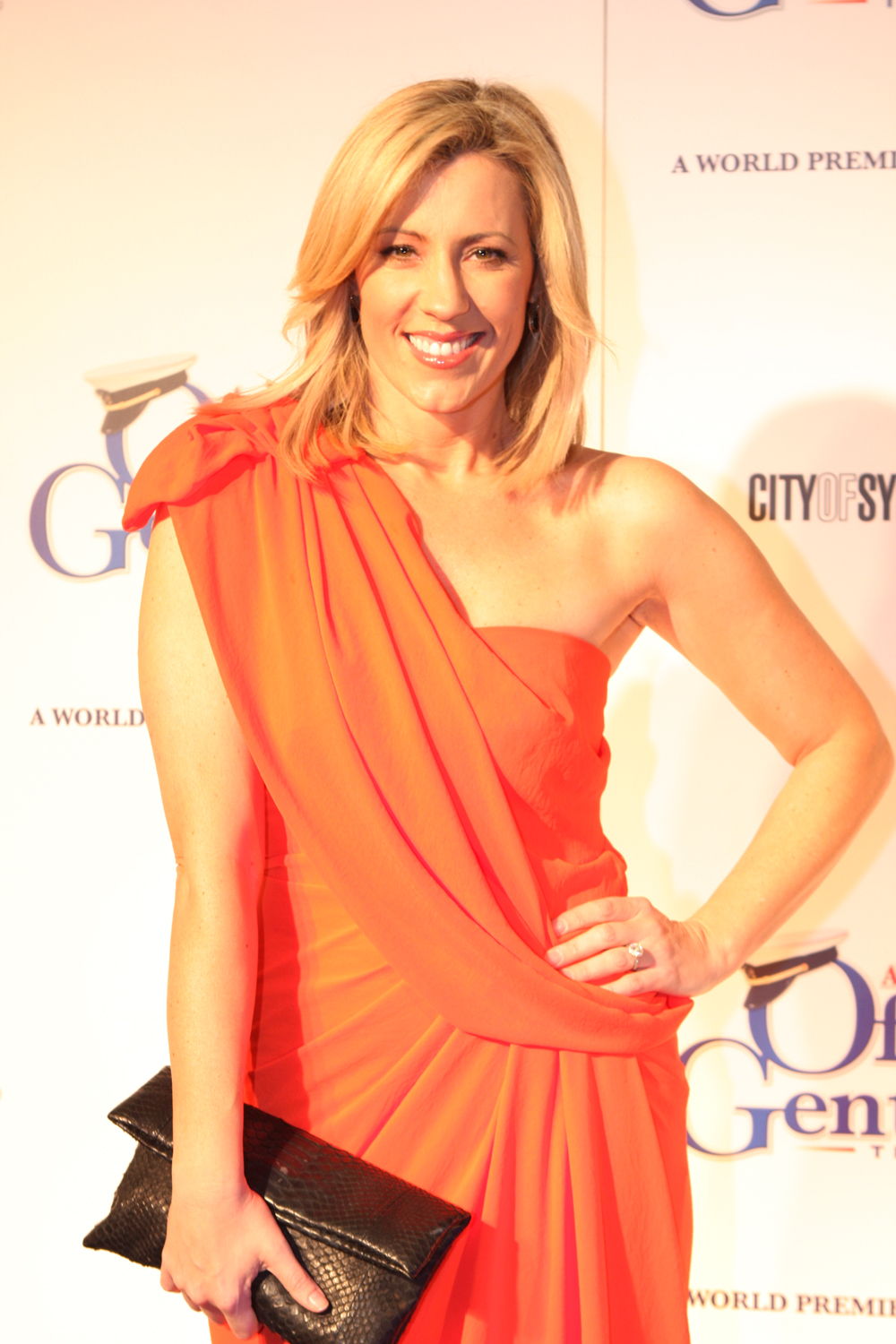
- Robinson in May 2012
- Born: Australia
- Occupations: Television presenter, news presenter, news journalist, radio host
- Spouse: Chris Reason
- Children: 2

Kathryn Robinson is an Australian journalist, television and radio presenter.

== Career ==
Robinson originally studied economics at Macquarie University in 1993 and began her career working for Macquarie Bank, before deciding to switch to journalism in 2001 when she completed her master's degree in journalism. She later worked as a reporter for the Seven Network's Sydney Weekender. Since that time she has worked as a reporter in the Prime newsroom in Orange, hosted State Focus, a Southern Cross Ten current affairs program in Canberra, and worked as a producer and presenter at Sky News Australia in Sydney.

From 2006-2011, she was a finance presenter on Ten Early News.

In 2010, Robinson co-hosted Good Morning Delhi, a breakfast program broadcast on Network Ten during the course of the 2010 Commonwealth Games, with Brad McEwan.

In January 2012, it was announced that Robinson would co-host Breakfast with Andrew Rochford (who left the show in June that year) and Paul Henry. The program originally intended to premiere on 27 February 2012, however the program premiered on 23 February 2012, due to Kevin Rudd resigning as the Minister for Foreign Affairs. The program was cancelled in November 2012 due to low ratings and it was announced Robinson would leave Network Ten altogether, though this was not to be the case.

It was later announced Robinson would join Sydney talkback radio station 2UE in 2013, hosting the breakfast shift alongside Ian Dickson. However, before beginning on air, Robinson pulled out of the role for unknown reasons. 2UE crime reporter Sarah Morice was given the hosting role instead. She was appointed host of a revamped version of Meet the Press in January in the same year, premiering on 17 February 2013.

She has been a fill in presenter for Carrie Bickmore on The Project and was a regular Friday night panellist on the program.

In 2025, Robinson is the host the ABC Radio Sydney's Morning show on Friday with Hamish Macdonald doing the program Monday to Thursday.

== Personal life ==
Robinson is married to Seven News senior journalist Chris Reason. They became parents to twins, a boy and a girl, in 2007. The birth was announced on Ten Early News, which Robinson usually presents, the following morning and the following evening on Seven News where Reason is a reporter. Robinson returned to work on Christmas Eve 2007, after five months of maternity leave.
