= Andrew Skarbek (game show contestant) =

Australian game show player (born 1967)

Andrew Skarbek (born 1967 or 1968) is an Australian game show player who became the first and only person to win the top prize of $1,000,000 on Australian TV game show Million Dollar Minute. In a show record run of 23 nights, Skarbek defeated 46 players, rejected over $150,000 in safe money and answered nearly 600 questions correctly to win the top prize on the episode aired on 27 March 2015.

Including an additional $16,000 in safe money picked up throughout earlier rounds, Skarbek's win is the biggest cash prize ever awarded in the history of Australian TV at A$1,016,000, beating the previous top prize offer of $1,000,000 previously awarded on Big Brother Australia, twice on Who Wants to Be a Millionaire? and The Big Adventure.
