= Wake Up (Australian TV program) =

2013–2014 Australian news TV series

- Genre: Breakfast television
- Created by: Adam Boland
- Presented by: Natarsha Belling; James Mathison
- Opening theme: "Gonna Make It" by Vydamo
- Country of origin: Australia
- Original language: English
- No. of seasons: 1
- No. of episodes: 147

Production
- Executive producer: Steve Wood
- Production locations: Manly Beach, Sydney, New South Wales; Federation Square, Melbourne, Victoria (news updates)
- Running time: 120 minutes

Original release
- Network: Network Ten
- Release: 4 November 2013 – 23 May 2014

Related
- Breakfast (2012)

Wake Up is an Australian breakfast television program produced by Network Ten. The show was hosted by Natarsha Belling and James Mathison. It aired weekday mornings from 6:30 am to 8:30 am, before Ten's morning talk show Studio 10. Wake Up, launched on 4 November 2013, was presented from Queenscliff Surf Club at Manly Beach in Sydney, with Nuala Hafner presenting national news updates from a glass studio at Federation Square in Melbourne. Due to poor ratings, the show was cancelled just six months after its debut, on 21 May 2014, with the last episode airing 23 May 2014.

== Presenters ==
| Presenter | Role | Tenure |
|---|---|---|
| James Mathison | Co-host | 2013–2014 |
| Natarsha Belling | Co-host | 2013–2014 |
| Nuala Hafner | News | 2013–2014 |

=== Reporters and contributors ===
| Presenter | Role |
|---|---|
| Maude Garrett | Los Angeles correspondent |
| Michele Mahone | Entertainment correspondent |
| Sam Mac | Reporter |
| James Kerley | Online reporter |
| Jo Lamble | Psychologist |
| Monica Attard | Foreign affairs analyst |
| Andrew Rochford | Health reporter |
| Fr. Bob Maguire | "The World According to Fr. Bob" segment |

Natasha Exelby was originally a co-host alongside Belling and Mathison, but was dropped from the show less than three weeks after its launch due to a lack of chemistry. Creator Adam Boland stated that he saw "genuine spark during show rehearsals" but that it did not translate on air.

== Controversy ==
On 14 May 2014, the morning after the announcement of the 2014 Australian federal budget, Wake Up invited Prime Minister Tony Abbott to take part in an on-air forum involving members of the public. One of the participants, 85-year-old Brisbane pensioner Vilma Ward, began to ambush Abbott live on air, telling him "I've never heard such rubbish in all my life" referring to his plan to raise the pension age. Ward also called Abbott a "comedian". It later emerged that Ward had strong links with the Australian Labor Party dating back to the 1960s and had appeared in an election campaign brochure. Network Ten admitted they were not aware of Ward's links prior to the segment.

== Reception ==
Following its first show, Wake Up was considered in some quarters as a vast improvement over its predecessor, Breakfast.

Wake Up's first episode averaged 52,000 viewers nationally. A week after the first episode, the show had lost around half of its audience share, even rating lower than Breakfast (Wake Up's predecessor, which had been cancelled the year before due to low ratings).
