= Andrew O'Keefe =

Australian television presenter

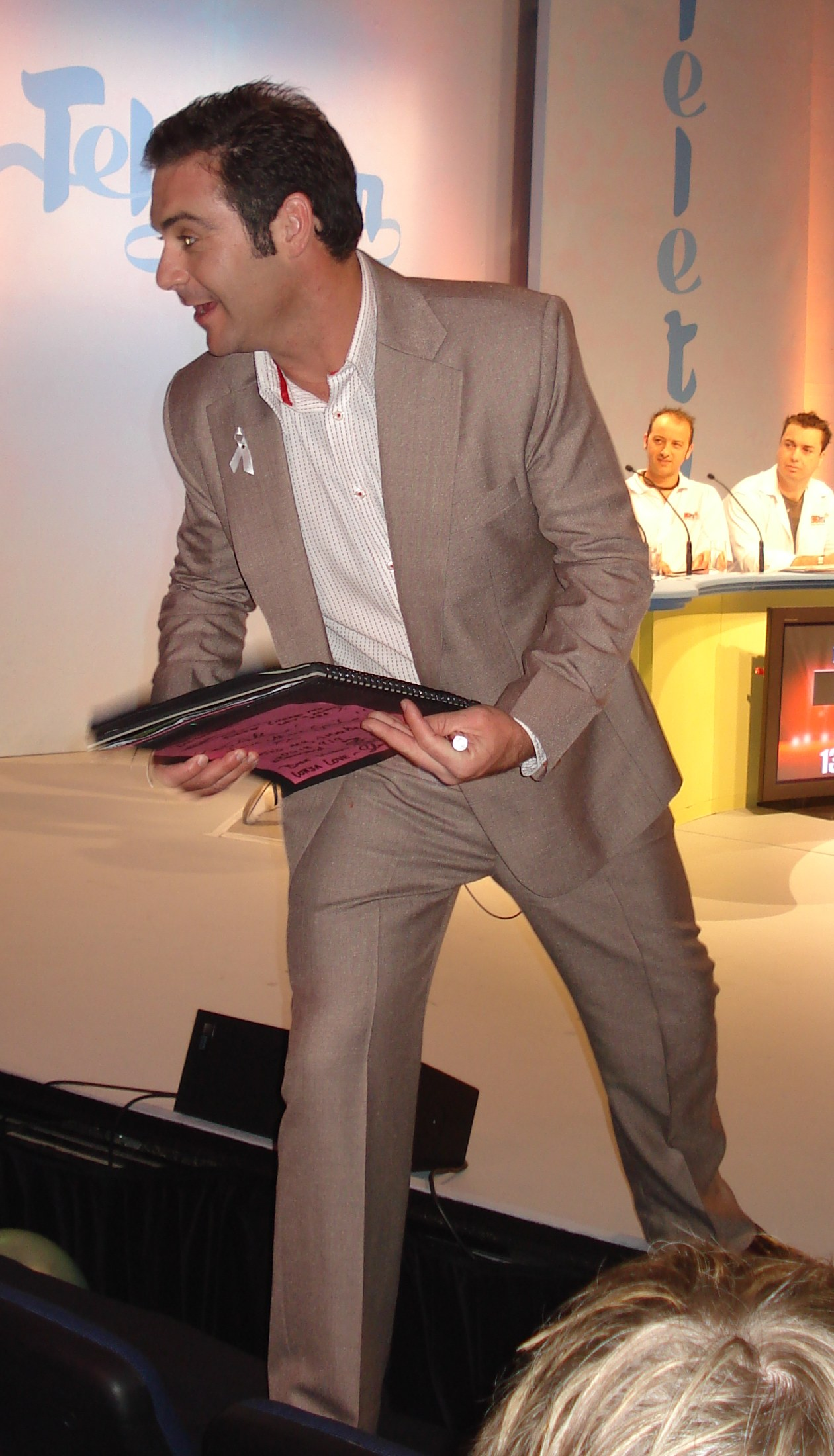
- O'Keefe in 2006
- Born: Andrew Patrick O'Keefe; 1 October 1971 (age 55); Sydney, New South Wales, Australia
- Other name: A.O.K
- Years active: 2003–2021
- Known for: Deal or No Deal (2003–2013); The Rich List (2007–2009); Weekend Sunrise (2005–2017); The Chase Australia (2015–2021)
- Spouse: Eleanor Campbell (div. 2019)
- Children: 3
- Parent: Barry O'Keefe (father)
- Family: Johnny O'Keefe (uncle)

Andrew Patrick O'Keefe (born 1 October 1971) is an Australian former television presenter and lawyer. He co-hosted the weekend edition of breakfast program Weekend Sunrise from 2005 until 2017 as well as the Australian versions of game shows Deal or No Deal, and The Chase Australia. Since 2021, he has been convicted of drug and domestic violence offences.

== Legal career ==
O'Keefe worked as an intellectual property lawyer with law firm Allens Arthur Robinson.

== Media career ==
O'Keefe first started his television career in 2003 in Channel Seven's show Big Bite. Later the same year he began hosting Deal or No Deal, staying for 10 years.

In 2005, O'Keefe co-hosted the tri-network tsunami appeal Reach Out for relief efforts around Asia, which aired on Seven, Nine and Ten. In the same year, he hosted the short-lived Dragons Den and co-hosted the 47th TV Week Logie Awards.

From 2005 to 2017, O'Keefe co-hosted Weekend Sunrise on Saturday and Sunday mornings. He was co-hosting with Samantha Armytage from 2007, when Lisa Wilkinson moved to Today, until 2013, when Armytage moved to the main Sunrise program. Armytage was replaced with Monique Wright on Weekend Sunrise as a result. He also regularly substituted for David Koch on Sunrise.

From 2007 to 2009, O'Keefe hosted the quiz show The Rich List.

On 31 May 2013, O'Keefe commenced playing the role of King Herod in the Australian tour of the Jesus Christ Superstar arena show. However, on 14 June 2013, he was admitted to hospital with a neck injury requiring surgery and was forced to relinquish the role for the rest of the tour. O'Keefe believed the injury was aggravated during a performance of the show.

In 2015, O'Keefe began presenting Seven's new game show, The Chase Australia.

In December 2017, O'Keefe announced his resignation as co-host of Weekend Sunrise after 12 years with the show.

O'Keefe's contract with the Seven Network expired at the end of 2020, and he was replaced by Larry Emdur for The Chase Australia.

== Community and charity work ==
O'Keefe is a former chairman of the White Ribbon Australia, an organisation dedicated to the prevention of violence against women. He was one of the founding members of the campaign in Australia and was an ambassador from 2004, prior to the organisation's dissolution in 2019.

As a result of his work with the White Ribbon Australia, O'Keefe was appointed to the inaugural National Council for the Prevention of Violence Against Women in May 2008, which drafted the report Time for Action: Australia's National Plan for Reducing Violence Against Women and their Children on behalf of the federal government.

== Honours ==
In January 2017, O'Keefe was appointed a Member of the Order of Australia (AM) for his television and charity work. His appointment was terminated by the Governor-General in June 2025.

== Personal life ==
O'Keefe is one of five children. His father is Barry O'Keefe, a judge of the Supreme Court of New South Wales. He is a nephew of the Australian rock and roll singer Johnny O'Keefe.

In 2018 and 2019, Andrew performed some of his uncle's songs in a concert show entitled Andrew O'Keefe Shouts Johnny O'Keefe.

He attended Saint Ignatius' College, Riverview, and then studied arts and law at the University of Sydney.

O'Keefe was married and has three children. In 2017, the couple separated; in 2019, they divorced.

=== Arrests and criminal charges ===
In January 2021, O'Keefe was arrested and charged with domestic violence and common assault against his partner. An interim apprehended violence order was sought against O'Keefe by NSW Police on behalf of his partner. In June 2021, O'Keefe had the charges dismissed as the community magistrate found that he was in a hypomanic bipolar state when the offending occurred during the altercation. He was ordered to complete an intensive mental health treatment program.

In September 2021, O'Keefe was arrested by police for domestic violence–related offences, including contravening an apprehended violence order and assault. Footage was later released during his court session in November 2023 showing O'Keefe hurling abuse at police. In January 2024, he was found guilty of the charges and sentenced to a 12-month community corrections order and three 18-month community corrections orders.

On 27 January 2022, O'Keefe was arrested after he allegedly grabbed a woman by the throat, pushed her to the ground, and punched and kicked her at his sister's unit in Sydney. He was later refused bail after his arrest.

On 11 February 2022, he pleaded guilty to possession of 1.5 grams of marijuana. He has a long history of drug abuse, including cocaine and methamphetamine abuse.

On 4 May 2022, O'Keefe was denied bail and served five months in jail after failing a drug test. The magistrate said, "There will be a contempt citation unless he retracts and apologises for his behaviour". On 23 May, O'Keefe appeared in the Supreme Court of New South Wales and was granted bail, with strict conditions that he be sent to a drug and alcohol rehabilitation facility in Swan Bay, north of Sydney, for up to a year. Justice Hulme said O'Keefe had long struggled with mental health issues and that rehabilitation was a "good opportunity" for him. He was scheduled to appear before the Downing Centre Local Court in June 2022 for sentencing after earlier pleading guilty to one charge of possessing 1.6 grams of cannabis.

On 24 November 2022, after months on bail, O'Keefe was arrested again at his Vaucluse home for allegedly breaching his bail conditions.

On 4 April 2023, O'Keefe was arrested after failing a random breath test in Sydney's Eastern Suburbs.

On 19 August 2023, O'Keefe was arrested for allegedly breaching an apprehended violence order. He was released from jail a few days later.

On 5 December 2023, O'Keefe pleaded guilty after he was charged with drug driving at Point Piper.

On 28 July 2024, O'Keefe tested positive at a roadside drug test at Bellevue Hill in Sydney's Eastern Suburbs. He was later charged with driving under the influence, and with contravening an apprehended violence order and stalking or intimidating. He was bailed to reappear on 14 August.

On 14 September 2024, O'Keefe was revived by paramedics after overdosing on drugs at a party in Vaucluse. It was later revealed in April 2025 that a 38 year old socialite gave O'Keefe Narcan, a drug which reverses overdose by blocking the effects of opiates on the brain and by restoring breathing.

On 16 September 2024, O’Keefe was arrested for breaching his bail conditions.

In January 2025, O'Keefe was charged for drug driving for the second time. He was scheduled to appear in court on 20 January. He was issued a $440 fine and banned from driving for six months.

== Filmography ==
Title	Year	Role
Big Bite	2003–2004	Host
Deal or No Deal	2003–2013	Host
NewsWeek	2004	Host
Carols in the Domain	2004	Himself
Weekend Sunrise	2005–2017	Host
Rove Live	2005	Himself
Dragons Den	2005	Host
The Chaser's War on Everything	2006	Himself
Kath and Kim	2007	Himself
The Rich List	2007–2009	Host
TV Burp	2009	Himself
Animal Kingdom	2010	Himself (Voice Only) (uncredited)
Stefan and Craig: Slightly Live	2010	Himself
Review with Myles Barlow	2010	Himself
31 Questions	2012	Himself
Dirty Laundry Live	2014	Himself
Back Seat Drivers	2014	Himself
The Chase Australia	2015–2021	Host
Shaun Micallef's Mad as Hell	2020	Himself
Beat the Chasers Australia	2020	Himself
