= David Woiwod =

Australian journalist and TV presenter

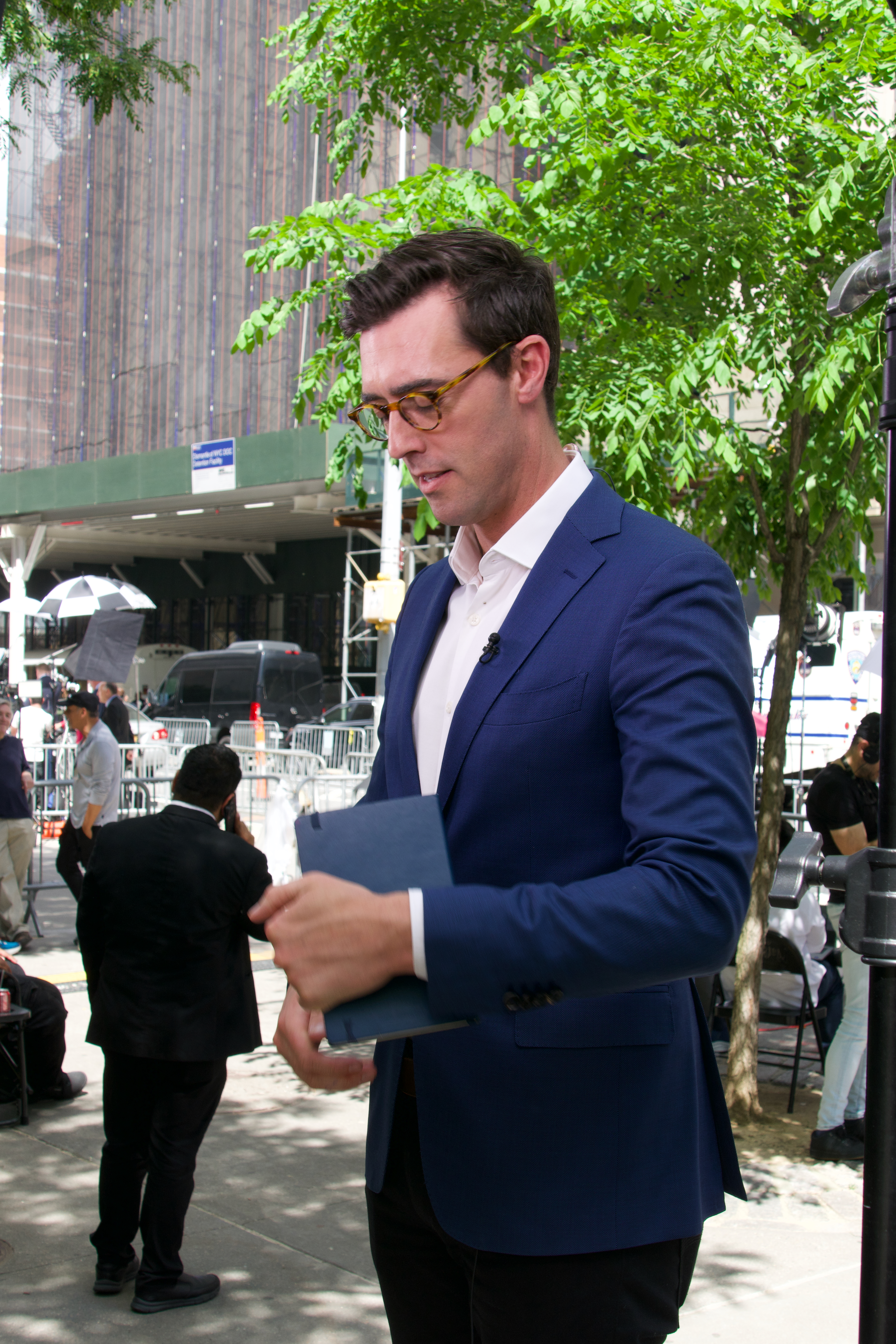
- Woiwod in New York City in May 2024.
- Born: 8 March 1984 (age 42)
- Occupation: Television presenter
- Employer: Seven Network

David Woiwod (born 8 March 1984) is an Australian television presenter.

Woiwod is currently co-host of Weekend Sunrise with Monique Wright.

== Career ==
Early in his career, Woiwod worked as the state political reporter for 10 News Melbourne, a role he held from February 2011 until February 2015. During this period he covered Victorian politics, state elections and major policy developments, establishing himself as one of the network’s key reporters in the parliamentary round.

In December 2016, Woiwod joined the Seven Network and was appointed the Melbourne correspondent for its national breakfast program Sunrise and Seven News Melbourne reporter. His reporting regularly featured major breaking news, weather events and live crosses from across Victoria, contributing to the program’s national coverage.

In July 2020, Woiwod departed Sunrise after being appointed Seven News US correspondent. Based in the network’s Los Angeles bureau, he reported on major American political, social and cultural events for Seven’s news programs. He was promoted to US bureau chief in May 2023 following the relocation of then‑chief Ashlee Mullany to Europe.

In December 2024, Woiwod was announced as the new co‑host of Weekend Sunrise, succeeding Matt Doran. He commenced in the role on 14 December 2024. Alongside his weekend presenting duties, he also serves as an occasional fill‑in for Matt Shirvington on Sunrise.
