= Kylie Gillies =

Australian television presenter (born 1967)

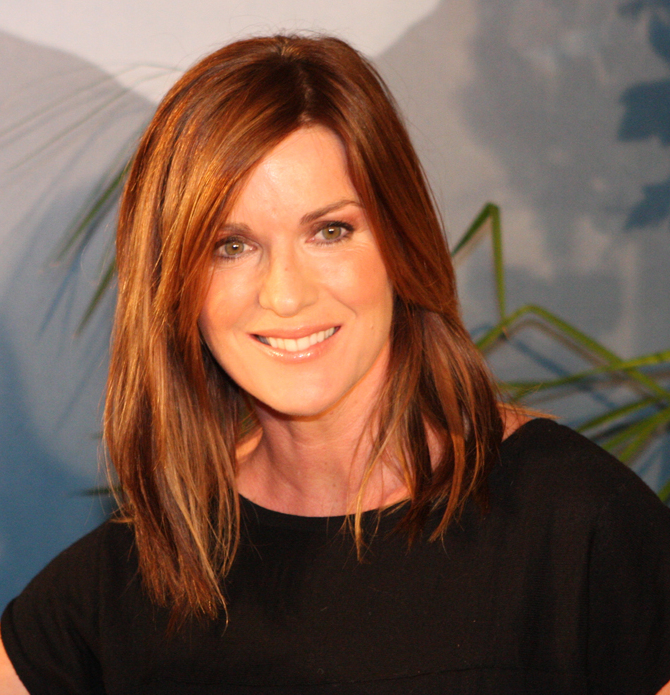
- Gillies in May 2012
- Born: 4 May 1967 (age 59); Tamworth, New South Wales, Australia
- Occupations: Seven Network presenter and journalist
- Years active: 1991−present
- Spouse: Tony Gillies (1989–present)
- Children: 2
- Website: The Morning Show profile

Kylie Gillies (born 4 May 1967) is an Australian television presenter for the Seven Network, based in Sydney, Australia. Gillies is the co-host of The Morning Show with Larry Emdur.

== Career ==
Gillies was born in Tamworth and attended Tamworth High School. She started working as a researcher at radio station 2TM, then began working as a reporter, producer and news presenter for Prime Television for ten years. Her first role at Seven was an assistant producer on Seven's Late News with Anne Fulwood.

Prior to The Morning Show, Gillies was on Sportsworld as the sports news presenter. Gillies has also been a reporter for Seven's Australian Open Tennis coverage, providing the weather and the sports reports for each day of the Open.

In December 2006, Kylie was a regular presenter of the weekend sport report on Sydney's edition of Seven News. She has also been a fill in presenter on Sunrise, Weekend Sunrise, Seven Morning News, Seven 4.30 News, Today Tonight and Seven News in Sydney. In June 2007, Gillies began her role as co-host on The Morning Show with Larry Emdur, which airs after Sunrise

In June 2009, Kylie announced that she would take part in Dancing with the Stars. She finished in third place.

In April 2011, she presented reports for The Morning Show and Seven News live from London for the Royal Wedding of Prince William and Catherine Middleton.

In 2014, Gillies and her The Morning Show co-host Larry Emdur reported on the events of the 2014 Sydney hostage crisis before transferring transmission to the network's Melbourne Studios

Gillies celebrated 20 years with the Seven Network, and 10 years with co-host Emdur on The Morning Show in 2017.

== Personal life ==
Gillies married journalist Tony Gillies in 1989 and they have two sons.
