= Sally Obermeder =

Australian media personality and television presenter

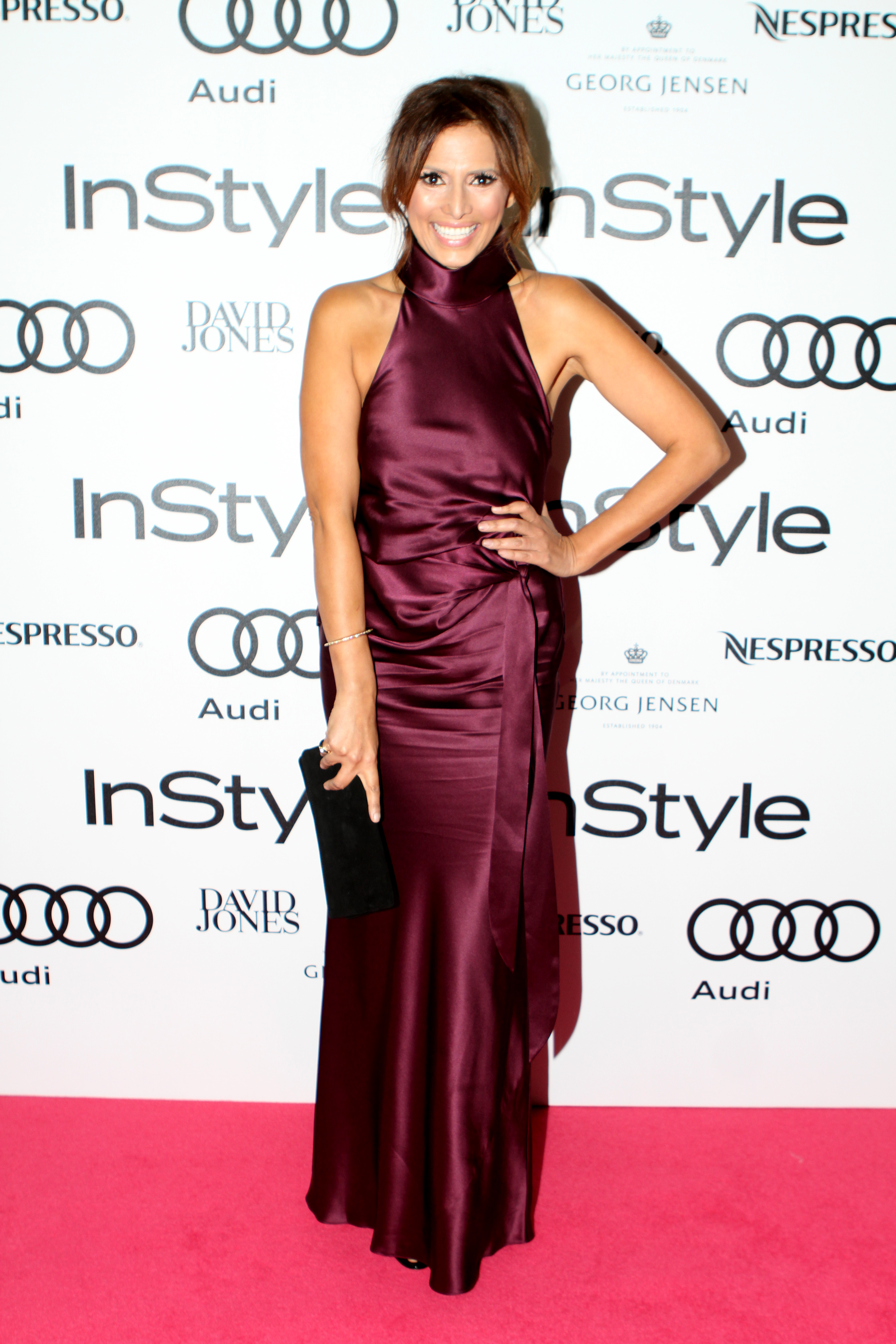
- Born: 17 August 1972 (age 54); Paddington, New South Wales, Australia
- Occupations: Media personality and TV presenter
- Years active: 2003–present
- Known for: The Daily Edition
- Spouse: Marcus Obermeder (2001–present)
- Children: 2

Sally Obermeder (born 17 August 1972) is an Australian media personality and television presenter.

== Career ==
=== Swiish ===
In November 2012, Obermeder launched Swiish, a lifestyle blog. The website covers fashion, beauty, health, home and family.

=== Books ===
Obermeder's first book, Never Stop Believing, was released in April 2013 through Allen & Unwin. In the memoir, Obermeder describes her struggles to succeed in commercial television, as well as her experience of cancer.

Obermeder and her sister released their first e-book, Super Green Smoothies, in September 2014. In April 2013, a paperback version of the book was published by the Allen and Unwin publishing company. The book is in its 12th reprint and has sold over 120,000 copies, making it the bestselling smoothie book in Australia. Super Green Smoothies was also the third highest-selling non-fiction book of 2015.

In March 2016, Obermeder and Koraiem released The Good Life, a cookbook of their favourite meals.

In September 2017, Obermeder and Koraiem released their third cookbook, Super Green, Simple and Lean, which has recipes for smoothies, salads, bowls, and snacks.

=== Television career ===
In 2005, Obermeder joined the Seven Network as a food, fashion, and shopping presenter on Sydney Weekender.

In 2008, Obermeder joined the network’s evening current affairs show Today Tonight as their National Entertainment and Lifestyle Reporter

In 2013, Obermeder was appointed co-host of the Seven Network's afternoon show The Daily Edition alongside Tom Williams, Monique Wright and Kris Smith. The show was a combination of breaking news, live interviews and entertainment updates. The live panel show aired on weekdays at 2pm before it was axed in June 2020. Obermeder left the Seven Network following its final episode on 26 June 2020.

=== Ambassadorships ===
Obermeder is an ambassador for the National Breast Cancer Foundation, The Sony Foundation, and also works with the Nelune Foundation and The Breast Cancer Network of Australia.

== Personal life ==
Obermeder married Marcus Obermeder in 2001. After several years of trying to conceive a baby, the couple tried In vitro fertilisation (IVF) and conceived in January 2011. Their daughter was born in October 2011, the day after Sally Obermeder was diagnosed with stage 3 breast cancer. In July 2016 Obermeder said that she was to have another child by a surrogate mother.

=== Cancer diagnosis ===
Once her daughter was born, Obermeder started chemotherapy. Obermeder, her colleagues, and her friends in the television industry put on a fundraising event at The Beresford in February 2012.

Obermeder attended the InStyle magazine 'Women of Style Awards' in May 2012. She received a standing ovation for her speech in which she discussed the meaning of style, and what she has learned through her battle with cancer while also being a new mum. Additionally, Obermeder wrote a book about her experience.

In October 2012, Obermeder was given the all clear. In 2016, Obermeder celebrated passing the five year all-clear mark.
