= Adam Boland =

Australian producer (born 1977)

- Born: 1977 (age 48–49); Sydney, Australia
- Occupations: Television producer and director
- Known for: Sunrise, Weekend Sunrise, The Morning Show, Wake Up, Studio 10

Adam Boland (born 1977) is the managing director of the Australian production company, Bohdee Media. He was previously the executive producer of the Seven Network's breakfast show, Sunrise, and created The Morning Show and Weekend Sunrise.

== Early life and education ==
Boland was born in Sydney, Australia, in 1977, and lived his early life in Parramatta, Sydney. He then moved to Queensland with his mother. He studied journalism and politics at the University of Canberra in 1993, but left after one year to pursue a cadetship.

== Career ==
His first job was as a cadet reporter at the radio station 4BC in Brisbane, from 1994 to 1995. He then moved briefly to Melbourne radio station 3AW, before starting his television career in 1995 as a Sky News Australia producer, where he remained until 1997. From 1997 until 1999, he was the Cairns bureau chief of Network Ten, gaining notoriety for interviewing the comedian Jerry Seinfeld at Cairns Airport. Before working on Sunrise, Boland was a senior producer in ATN-7's Sydney newsroom.

From February 2002 until November 2010, Boland was the executive producer for the Seven Network's breakfast show Sunrise. Led by Boland, it became the number one breakfast morning program, beating the Nine Network's Today out of the spot which it had held for 20 years. He also created The Morning Show and Weekend Sunrise.

In June 2010, the Seven Network confirmed that Boland would leave the network at the end of the year, following the expiry of his contract. Seven's director of news and current affairs, Peter Meakin, said that Boland was not intending to move to another network.

In August 2010, the Seven Network announced that Boland would be setting up his own production company but would spend two days a week at the network in 2011 as director of social media and strategy.

In November 2011, Boland was appointed as executive producer of Weekend Sunrise. He left the Seven Network in February 2013.

From late-2011 until mid-2012, Boland and his then-partner Julian Wong endeavoured to set up a Ginseng Korean bathhouse in Potts Point, but after falling $1.2 million short of the needed $4.4 million to fund the whole project the venture did not happen. They reportedly lost $600,000 on the project.

In March 2013, Boland joined Network Ten as the network's director of morning television. He resigned due to ill-health on 23 January 2014, less than three months after the programs he created, Wake Up and Studio 10, were launched.

In October 2014, Boland released the book Brekky Central: Behind the smiles of Australian breakfast television (ISBN 9780522867183) which reflects on his media career and the competitive television industry. He founded Bohdee Media in 2018.

== Personal life ==
Boland suffers from depressive illnesses including bipolar disorder and the conditions have affected his life to the extent that he has had to stop work for significant periods to regain his health. In 2010, he was selected by readers of a long-established gay and lesbian website, samesame, as one of the 25 most influential gay Australians.
