= Weekend Sunrise =

Australian breakfast television program

- Genre: Breakfast news program
- Presented by: Monique Wright; David Woiwod; Sally Bowrey; James Tobin
- Opening theme: (Reach Up for The) Sunrise by Duran Duran
- Country of origin: Australia
- Original language: English
- No. of seasons: 18
- No. of episodes: 600+

Production
- Executive producer: Holly Fallon
- Production locations: Martin Place, New South Wales (2006–2023); Television City, South Eveleigh, New South Wales (2023–present)
- Running time: 180 minutes

Original release
- Network: Seven Network
- Release: 10 April 2005 – present

Related
- Sunrise; The Morning Show

Weekend Sunrise is an Australian breakfast television program, broadcast on the Seven Network and currently hosted by Monique Wright and David Woiwod.

== History ==
In 2005 the Seven Network replaced its struggling Sunday morning program Sunday Sunrise with a program called Weekend Sunrise, as an extension of the weekday brand. It originally was an hour-long (8:00 am to 9:00 am). Hosted by Chris Reason and Lisa Wilkinson, the program was successful and various critiques at the time called for the program to be lengthened to two hours (7:00 am to 9:00 am) and be extended to Saturday mornings as well as Sunday. Head of Morning TV’s Adam Boland’s intention was always to have the show across both days (hence the name), but news boss Peter Meakin talked him into just starting with Sunday given families usually were out doing sport on Saturday.

In 2006, Weekend Sunrise was extended from an hour to a two-hour show, running every Sunday from 8 am till 10 am. When Sportsworld returned for the football season Weekend Sunrise settled into a 90-minute format, 8:00 am to 9:30 am. After Sportsworld's series concluded, the show returned to a two-hour format. Andrew O'Keefe initially temporarily replaced host Chris Reason in 2006, but after improved ratings he was given the hosting position permanently. In 2007, Wilkinson moved to the Nine Network to host Today, and was replaced by Samantha Armytage. In 2008, Weekend Sunrise moved their start time 30 minutes earlier to 7:30 am, to match the new start time of Nine's Sunday program. The program continued to run through to 10:00 am, meaning the program had a two-and-a-half-hour running time.

In 2009, the program's start time was moved even earlier. Originally, it was announced that Today on Sunday (now Weekend Today), the replacement the long-running Nine's Sunday, would run from 7:30 to 9:00 am. But this was changed on 28 January 2009 to 7:00 am to 9:00 am. As result, Seven announced that Weekend Sunrise would also commence at 7:00 am and run through to 10:00 am, meaning the program would go for three hours, the same as the weekday version of Sunrise.

On 13 February 2010, Boland got his wish as Seven announced that Weekend Sunrise would extend to Saturdays to compete against Weekend Today. The Saturday edition airs in the same time slot as Weekend Today, i.e. 7:00 am to 10:00 am. Saturday Disney, which previously occupied the timeslot, immediately followed Weekend Sunrise, until in 2012 it was permanently moved to 7two, airing in the same timeslot as Weekend Sunrise. The original Saturday team consisted of Samantha Armytage co-hosting with Larry Emdur with Sarah Cumming presenting the news, Simon Reeve presenting sport and James Tobin presenting the weather.

In November 2011, Adam Boland was appointed executive producer of the program. Boland overhauled the program introducing a new format, a number of new segments and new regulars. These changes were scheduled to introduced on 5 November 2011, however due an apparent server crash, the program was cancelled at the last minute. The relaunch took place the following day as a result.

In September 2012, executive producer Adam Boland announced that the show would extend to three hours on Saturday from October. Boland finished with the Seven Network in February 2013 to later join Network Ten. Sunrise executive producer Michael Pell replaced Boland. In June 2013, Melissa Doyle announced that she would be leaving Sunrise for a national network role, with Samantha Armytage replacing her. Monique Wright initially replaced Armytage on Weekend Sunrise, but it was not until February 2014 in which Wright was made a permanent co-host on the show.

In February 2016, Angela Cox joined and filled-in for Monique Wright as co-host of the show whilst she was on maternity leave. At the same time, Sally Bowrey joined the show as entertainment and social media presenter. On 4 March 2016, Weekend Sunrise held a Parathon, to raise funds to send athletes to the 2016 Paralympic Games. The program included appearances from stars of Home and Away, My Kitchen Rules and Saturday Disney, as well as performances from Samantha Jade and Russell Morris and was extended to midday. It raised over $1.6 million. In December 2016, Angela Cox returned to Weekend Sunrise to cover news whilst Sally Bowrey was on maternity leave. In July 2017, Bowrey returned to the show as news presenter.

In December 2017, after twelve years in the role, O'Keefe resigned, citing his desire to spend more time with his family on weekends. Basil Zempilas was announced as his replacement. In September 2019, Zempilas stepped down as regular host of Weekend Sunrise, citing a desire to spend more time with his family in Perth. Matt Doran was named as his replacement; he appeared as a regular co-presenter for the first time on 12 October.

Simon Reeve made his last on air appearance on Weekend Sunrise in May 2020 before the Seven Network made him redundant in June 2020. Reeve would later sue the network over his axing.

Weekend Sunrise moved to South Eveleigh on 29 July 2023, after the last broadcast in Martin Place on 23 July 2023. With this change, the show received a new logo.

In November 2024, Matt Doran announced he was leaving Weekend Sunrise to focus on family and pursue other opportunities. Doran’s final show was on 8 December 2024. US Bureau Chief David Woiwod was announced days later as the replacement of Doran as co-host. Woiwod's first show was on 14 December 2024.

== Format ==
Similar to Sunrise, Weekend Sunrise blends a mixture of news every thirty minutes, interviews and light-hearted feature pieces into three hours each morning. Occasionally, Weekend Sunrise may present the show from other locations, however, unlike Sunrise, this is less common.

=== News ===
As with Sunrise, national news updates are provided at the half-hour mark, followed by a summary of overnight sport and weather.

== Hosts ==
Presenter	Role	Tenure
Monique Wright	Co-host	2013–present
David Woiwod	Co-host & Sport	2024–present
Sally Bowrey	News	2016–present
James Tobin	Weather	2009–present

Current presenters who have been fill-in hosts or co-hosts of Weekend Sunrise in recent times include Sally Bowrey, Edwina Bartholomew, Michael Usher, Angela Cox, Natarsha Belling, Liam Tapper, James Tobin, Hugh Whitfeld, Matthew White and Chris Reason.

Fill-in presenters for other roles, in order from most likely to be used to least likely to be used:

- News: Edwina Bartholomew, Hugh Whitfeld, Liam Tapper and Teegan Dolling.
- Weather: Katie Brown, Sam Payne and Georgia Costi.

== Previous hosts ==
Presenter	Role	Tenure
Chris Reason	Co-host	2005
Andrew O'Keefe	Co-host	2005–2017
Lisa Wilkinson	Co-host	2005–2007
Larry Emdur	Co-host (Saturday)	2010
Samantha Armytage	Co-host	2007–2013
Basil Zempilas	Co-host	2018–2019
Matt Doran	Co-host; Sport	2019–2024; 2020–2024
Kylie Gillies	Sport	2005–2007
Ryan Phelan	Sport	2014–2015
Simon Reeve	News; Sport	2005–2007; 2007–2014; 2015–2020
Sharyn Ghidella	News	2008–2010
Jessica Rowe	News	2010–2013
Talitha Cummins	News	2007–2008; 2013–2016

Previous hosts of Weekend Sunrise include Chris Reason, Andrew O'Keefe, Basil Zempilas, Lisa Wilkinson and Samantha Armytage. Kylie Gillies was the original sports presenter until she moved to The Morning Show and Talitha Cummins presented the news from June 2007 until July 2008. Sharyn Ghidella presented the news from 2008 until 2010. Larry Emdur hosted Weekend Sunrise on Saturdays in 2010. Sarah Cumming previously presented the news on Saturday until she became the weather presenter on Seven News Sydney in 2011. Samantha Armytage hosted the program from June 2007 until August 2013 before becoming co-presenter of Sunrise. Jessica Rowe presented the news from 2010 until 2013. Ryan Phelan presented sport throughout the first half of 2015 before Simon Reeve returned to his post following the axing of Million Dollar Minute. Talitha Cummins presented the news from 2013 until 2016. Cummins was later dismissed from the Seven Network whilst she was on maternity leave; Sally Bowrey later replaced her.

=== Regulars ===
Presenter	Role	Tenure
Steve Hargrave	UK/Entertainment correspondent	2013–present
Paul Marshall	Correspondent	2014–present
Richard Arnold	UK entertainment	2009–present
Jake Lyle	Sydney reporter	2024–present
Kristy Mayr	Melbourne reporter	2025–present
Mark Riley	Chief political correspondent	2005–present
Jabba	Movie reviews	2013–present
Sarah Di Lorenzo	Nutritionist	2018–present
Jane Caro	Masters of Spin	2011–present
Nick Cater	Masters of Spin	2014–present
Meg Coffey	Masters of Spin	2022–present
Adam Ferrier	Masters of Spin	2014–present
Geof Parry	Foreign affairs	2026–present

== Broadcasting ==
Because Australia has more than one time zone, Weekend Sunrise is not broadcast live to all of Australia, it is instead broadcast delayed. New South Wales (including ACT), Victoria, Tasmania have Weekend Sunrise broadcast live all year round, Queensland has Sunrise broadcast live in wintertime, but during Daylight Saving Time in Sydney has the program delayed by one hour. The Northern Territory has Weekend Sunrise delayed 30 minutes during winter and 1 hour and 30 minutes during daylight saving in Sydney. South Australia has it delayed by 30 minutes all year around, and Western Australia has it delayed by 2 hours in wintertime and by 3 hours during daylight saving in Sydney.

Occasionally, broadcasts of Weekend Sunrise are altered during special circumstances. On the morning of 17 July 2010, Weekend Sunrise was extended well past 9am continuing into 1pm when Julia Gillard announced that Australia would be heading to the polls on 21 August. When Weekend Sunrise was covering the Victorian bushfires in February 2009, the show extended its coverage until 11am, with the extra hour dedicated to the events occurring in Victoria.

Neither Sunrise nor Weekend Sunrise air on Christmas Day. Since 2025 (and previously between 2007 and 2014), Weekend Sunrise does not air on the day of the Bathurst 1000.

== Logos ==
25 January 2010 – 31 January 2016

6 February 2016 – 8 August 2021

29 July 2023 – present

== Theme song ==
Weekend Sunrise used Duran Duran's "(Reach Up for The) Sunrise" as its theme song until 2010 when MGMT's "Electric Feel" replaced it. In November 2011, "(Reach Up for The) Sunrise" was reinstated as the theme song.

== See also ==
- Journalism in Australia
- List of Australian television series
