= Talitha Cummins =

Australian journalist

- Born: Gold Coast, Queensland, Australia
- Spouse: Ben Lucas
- Children: 2

Talitha Cummins (born 1979 or 1980) is an Australian journalist and television presenter.

Cummins has previously been a news presenter on Weekend Sunrise, reporter for Seven News and weather presenter on Seven News Brisbane.

== Career ==
Cummins has worked in many of Seven's Queensland's bureaus, she started out at Maroochydore before moving onto Cairns.

In 2011, Cummins moved to Sydney, where she was a reporter for Seven News Sydney and a fill in presenter on Seven Morning News and Seven Afternoon News.

In 2014, Cummings joined Weekend Sunrise team to replace Jessica Rowe as news presenter.

In January 2017, Cummins claimed that the Seven Network dismissed her whilst she was on maternity leave. She said she would take on the Seven Network for unfair dismissal.

Cummins was also a casual Triple M Sydney newsreader.

In October 2023, Cummins announced she was ending her media career to pursue her business in diamond and jewellery creating.

== Personal life ==
Cummins was born on the Gold Coast.

Cummins was engaged to former Olympic beach volleyball player Lee Zahner however they separated in 2010.

In May 2013, Cummins announced that she was engaged to personal trainer Ben Lucas and in October 2013, they married in New York.

It was revealed on the ABC's Australian Story in 2016 that she has battled alcoholism. Friend and fellow journalist Chris Bath said Cummins hid her drinking well and was always professional on air.
