= David Koch (television presenter) =

Australian television presenter

David "Kochie" Koch AM
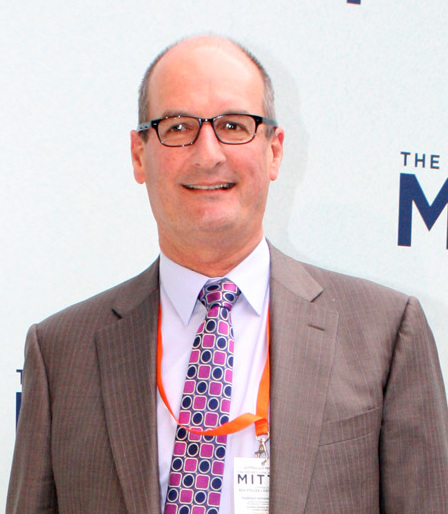
- David Koch in 2013
- Born: David James Koch; March 7, 1956 (age 70); Adelaide, South Australia
- Other name: Kochie
- Occupations: Television presenter; financial journalist; Sunrise co-host; Chairman of Port Adelaide Football Club
- Years active: 1980–present
- Employer: Seven Network
- Known for: Sunrise (2002–2023)
- Spouse: Elizabeth "Libby" Koch (m. 1979)
- Children: 4
- Relatives: Sir Eric Neal (uncle)

David James Koch AM (/ˈkɒʃ/ KOSH; born March 7, 1956), nicknamed "Kochie" (/ˈkɒʃi/ KOSH-ee), is an Australian television presenter and financial journalist. He is best known as a host of the Seven Network's breakfast program, Sunrise, from 2002 until 2023. He began his media career in Adelaide as a financial journalist, writing for a number of different publications before eventually moving to television.

Koch has been the chairman of the Port Adelaide Football Club, an Australian Football League (AFL) club since October 2012.

== Early and personal life ==
David James Koch was born in Adelaide, South Australia, to parents Yvonne (née Neal) and Leonard Koch Jr. (known as Dean Koch). He has two sisters – one of whom, Jane Elizabeth, died in early childhood – and a younger brother.

Koch's uncle, The Hon. Sir Eric Neal, served as the Governor of South Australia and as ex officio Lord Mayor of Sydney.

He studied to become an accountant.

Koch and his family currently live in Newport, New South Wales.

== Financial journalism ==
Koch started as a cadet on the business pages of The Australian newspaper before joining BRW magazine soon after its launch in the early 1980s.

He provides business and financial commentary for several publications, including Pacific Magazines, Yahoo Finance, and the "Your Money" section of News Ltd newspapers.

Koch was a director of the NSW Small Business Development Corporation Ltd for eight years after its inception in 1996. As a former business owner and operator and now director of Pinstripe Media Pty Ltd, he speaks regularly at corporate events about small business, finance and investment issues.

Koch has presented a weekly small business program on the Seven Network, Kochie's Business Builders. It was produced by Koch's company Pinstripe Media.

In 2007, Koch launched Pinstripe Media, a video production and content marketing agency that manages a network of sites including Startup Daily, Flying Solo and Kochie's Business Builders. Koch sold Pinstripe Media to Private Media, publisher of Crikey, in July 2025.

In 2013, Koch launched KBB Digital, a digital marketing agency for small business which is an extension of the Kochie's Business Builders brand.

In 2020, in partnership with Kylie Merritt, Koch launched ausbiz, an Australian business and finance streaming platform.

In August 2023, Koch joined Compare the Market Australia as an economic director.

== Television career ==
=== Sunrise ===
Koch was co-host of Seven Network's Sunrise breakfast program for 21 years, from 2002 until 2023. He was initially hired to replace Chris Reason who stepped down after a cancer diagnosis towards the end of 2002; however, his position later became permanent. He and his original co-host, Melissa Doyle, hosted the program over a period that saw viewer ratings grow until Sunrise became the leading breakfast television show in Australia.

In May 2006, Koch & Doyle were acquitted of contempt of court charges in a Melbourne Local Court after the name of a 14-year-old boy was published in a case in which the boy sought an irreconcilable differences order against his parents. The Seven Network and the show's producer were convicted of the offence.

In August 2022, the Seven Network released a statement declaring Sunrise had won the breakfast TV ratings in its timeslot for the 19th year in a row.

Koch's name and image have been falsely used in several online scams in Australia, which Koch warned Sunrise viewers about in January 2023.

Koch announced on 28 May 2023 that he would leave the program to spend time with family and to manage the Port Adelaide Football Club. After a 21-year tenure, he is Australia's longest-serving breakfast television host, having broadcast 16,000 hours of live TV across 5,300 shows, and conducted 50,000 interviews. Matt Shirvington was announced as his replacement on 5 June 2023. His last broadcast was on 9 June 2023.

=== Other ===
Koch also co-hosted another Seven Network production, Where Are They Now?, also with then-Sunrise co-host Melissa Doyle. He also hosts a show for small businesses, Kochie's Business Builders, which airs on Sundays on the Seven Network.

He has also co-hosted Seven Network's annual Christmas TV special Carols in the Domain eight times between 2014 and 2022.

== Recognition ==
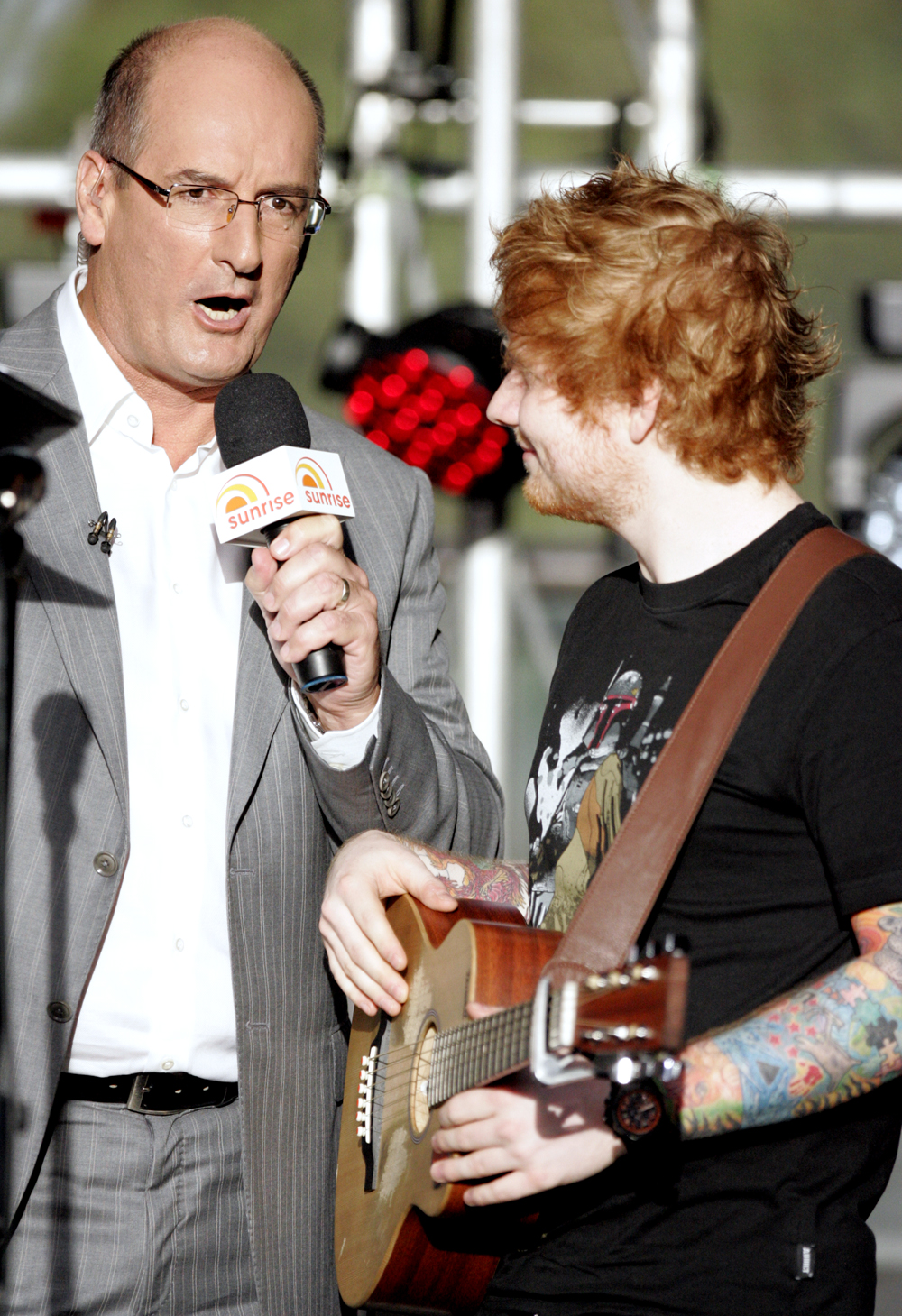
Koch interviewing singer Ed Sheeran

Koch was nominated for a silver Logie in 2004 and 2005 for Best TV Presenter.

In 2007, readers of Banking and Finance Magazine voted Koch Australia's Best Finance Journalist, while the Council of Small Business Organisations of Australia presented him with the "Small Business Champion award" in recognition of his support of Australian small business.

Koch was named 2007 Australian Father of the Year by the Australian Father's Day Council on 31 August 2007.

Koch was honoured with the Order of Australia (AM) in 2024, "for significant service to media as a television presenter and to economic journalism".

=== Parodies ===
After he had published a book of jokes compiled from his daily joke segment on TV, the book was parodied in an episode of The Chaser's War on Everything where reading jokes from "Kochie" was the only thing that got a laugh at a stand-up comedy club.

Koch was frequently parodied on the television show Comedy Inc., in which he was played by Paul McCarthy. Reader's Digest listed him in the top 50 Most Trusted Australians.

=== Honorary Doctorate ===
Koch was awarded an Honorary Doctorate from Flinders University in April 2026. The university acknowledges Koch's "contribution as one of Australia's most prominent financial commentators and media professionals, who continues to use his extensive expertise to advocate for small business and to promote South Australia as a destination of choice."

== Port Adelaide Football Club ==
David Koch speaking at the Port Adelaide Football Club AGM in January 2020.

Koch was the number one ticket-holder of Australian Football League team Port Adelaide Football Club from 2007, jointly with Australian model and actress Teresa Palmer in 2009.

On 2 October 2012, Koch was announced as the chairman of the club, effective from the beginning of 2013, succeeding Brett Duncanson.

== Other activities ==
Koch appeared on Australian soap opera Home and Away in 2007 and appeared on All Saints in 2004 as an Elvis impersonator.

He played the voice of the News Report in the Australian version of the 2009 DreamWorks film, Monsters vs. Aliens.

In October 2014, Koch launched his website rescue competition (Rescue My Website), to help change the digital lives of three Australian small businesses.

He has climbed Mount Kilimanjaro twice to raise money for charity and walked the Kokoda Track.

== Philanthropy ==
Avatar of David Koch

David Koch
(@kochie_online)
tweeted:

Inspiring time with kids from @YOTSAustralia unveiling their welcome totems at Koch Centre For Youth Macquarie Fields

24 March 2015

Koch is a patron of Youth Off The Streets' Koch Centre For Youth and Learning in Sydney's Macquarie Fields, which opened in 2011.

He has also been involved with the Channel Seven Perth Telethon, an annual event raising money for charities, including the Perth Children's Hospital and Melbourne's Good Friday Appeal, raising money for the Royal Children's Hospital. Koch has been involved in 13 consecutive Good Friday Appeal fundraisers.

Through a Sunrise campaign and his involvement in ShareLife, Koch influenced the federal government to establish a national authority (the Organ & Tissue Authority) to oversee Australia's organ transplant system. Previously Australia had the highest level of registered organ donors per head of population in the world but one of the lowest transplant rates. The new national authority aims to bring Australian transplant rates up to world's best practice. Koch was Chairman of the 'Organ and Tissue Authority Advisory Council' but resigned on-air, during a Sunrise broadcast on 27 May 2015, in protest over a government review of organ donation. Assistant Health Minister Fiona Nash had failed to advise him about the review.

Avatar of David Koch

David Koch
(@kochie_online)
tweeted:

Just for clarity I’m alive and well and enjoying @AFL #gatherround in Adelaide with all my family. This stuff is really giving me the shits.

14 April 2023

Media offices
| Preceded by Chris Reason | Sunrise; Co-host; 2002–2023; With: Melissa Doyle (2002–13); Samantha Armytage (2013–21); Natalie Barr (2021–23) | Succeeded by Matt Shirvington |
Sporting positions
| Preceded by Brett Duncanson | Port Adelaide Football Club; Chairman; 2013–present | Succeeded by Incumbent |
