= Australia's Best Backyards =

- Starring: Jamie Durie
- Country of origin: Australia

Production
- Running time: 30 minutes (including commercials)

Original release
- Network: Seven Network
- Release: 29 July 2007

Australia's Best Backyards is an Australian lifestyle TV series on the Seven Network. The program is hosted by landscape gardener Jamie Durie, who previously hosted Backyard Blitz on the Nine Network.

The first episode aired on Sunday 29 July 2007 at 6:30 pm. The premiere episode rated 1.4 million viewers and was the 17th most watched program for the week.

== See also ==
- List of Australian television series
