= Natalie Barr =

Australian journalist

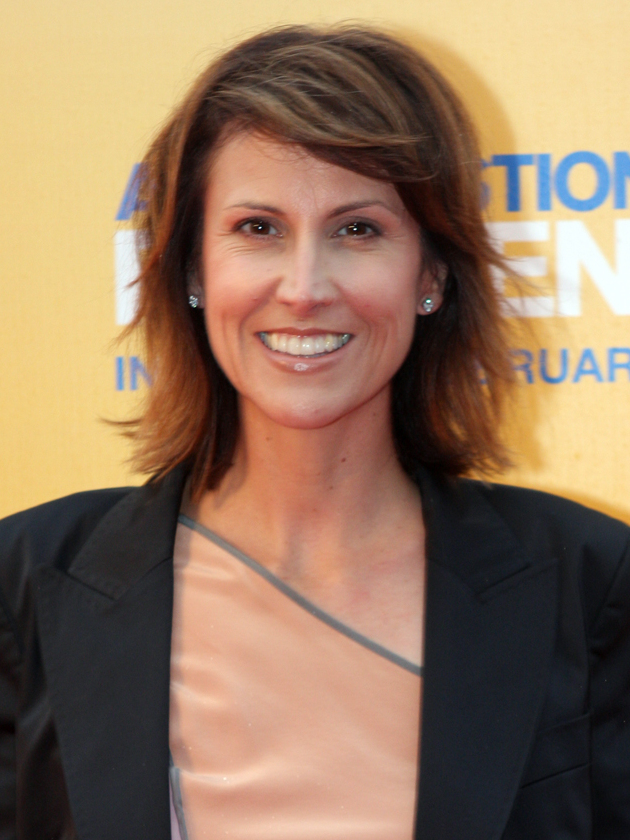
- Barr at the Any Questions for Ben? premiere in 2012
- Born: Natalie Ann Barr; 19 March 1968 (age 58); Bunbury, Western Australia, Australia
- Education: Curtin University
- Occupations: Journalist, news and TV presenter
- Years active: 1994−present
- Employer: Seven Network
- Spouse: Andrew Thompson (m. 1995)
- Children: 2

Natalie Ann Barr (born 19 March 1968) is an Australian television presenter, journalist, and news presenter.

Barr is currently co-host of the Seven Network's breakfast television program Sunrise alongside Matt Shirvington. She was previously the news presenter on the show.

== Career ==
In July 2008, Barr began presenting Seven Early News alongside Mark Beretta at 5.30am, which leads into Sunrise where she is still the news presenter. Barr also occasionally fills-in on Seven News Sydney.

Barr was a front-runner to co-host Sunday Night, a new current affairs show, however Chris Bath was appointed co-host with Mike Munro.

Barr made a guest appearance on Home and Away 16 April 2018, appearing as herself reporting that missing girl Ava Gilbert.

In June 2020, it was announced Barr will host Sunrise with David Koch and Samantha Armytage on Monday and Friday respectively, after Armytage requested a reduced workload. However, due to dwindling ratings, Barr returned to presenting the news five days a week. In January 2021, Barr again became the permanent Friday co-presenter, this time with Matt Doran.

On 14 March 2021, Barr was appointed co-host of Sunrise after Samantha Armytage's resignation.

== Personal life ==
Barr was born in Bunbury, Western Australia and is married to Andrew Thompson (a television commercial editor). They have two sons.
