= Samantha Armytage =

Australian television news presenter

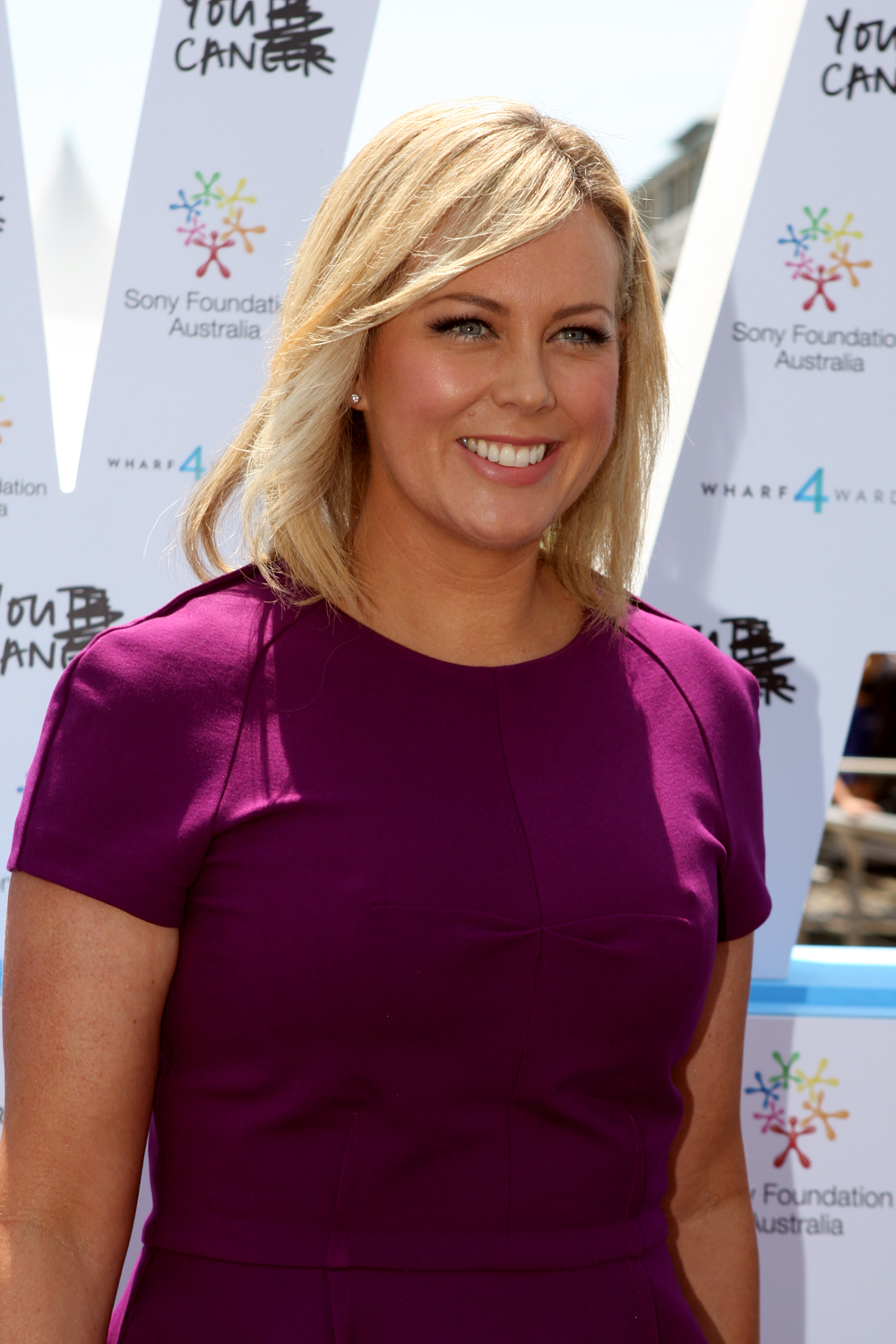
- Armytage in 2012
- Born: 4 September 1976 (age 50); Adaminaby, New South Wales, Australia
- Education: Kincoppal-Rose Bay; Charles Sturt University, Bathurst
- Occupation: Television presenter
- Years active: 1999–present
- Employer: Nine Network
- Notable credit(s): Seven 4.30 News presenter (2006–2012); Weekend Sunrise co-host (2007–2013); Sunrise co-host (2013–2021)
- Spouse: Richard Lavender (m. 2020; sep. 2024)

Samantha Armytage (born 4 September 1976) is an Australian journalist and television presenter. She co-hosted the Seven Network's breakfast television program Sunrise from 2013 to 2021 alongside David Koch. She also previously co-hosted Weekend Sunrise and presented Seven's 4.30 News.

== Early life ==
Armytage was born to Mac and Elizabeth Armytage and has a younger brother, Charlie. She grew up on Bolaro Station, a sheep property near Adaminaby in New South Wales, where her father was the station manager. She attended boarding school at Kincoppal-Rose Bay in Sydney starting from Year Nine and then studied at Charles Sturt University.

Armytage is a direct descendant of British settler George Armytage.

== Career ==
Armytage began her media career at WIN Television in Canberra in 1999, as a news reporter and presenter in Canberra. Following this she joined Sky News Australia in 2002 where she was chief political reporter.

=== Seven Network ===
In 2003, Armytage joined the Seven Network after being noticed by the network executives while covering the 2003 Canberra bushfires.

In December 2004, Armytage landed her first major presenting role, filling-in as presenter on Seven News Sydney over the summer non-ratings period. Following the non-ratings period she had stints presenting Seven Morning News, the national late news updates and filling in as presenter of Seven News Sydney. Throughout 2005 and 2006, Armytage was a regular fill-in presenter for Chris Bath on Seven News Sydney.

In October 2006, Armytage replaced Mike Amor as presenter of Seven 4.30 News. She had replaced Rebecca Maddern as presenter when the network moved production from Melbourne to Sydney.

In 2011, Armytage was a contestant on Dancing with the Stars and continued to file reports for Sunday Night while also being a regular fill-in presenter on Sunrise, Today Tonight and The Morning Show.

In 2014, Armytage presented the makeover reality show Bringing Sexy Back, which was cancelled after one season due to low ratings.

In October 2021, the Seven Network announced that Armytage would take part in Seven's race day coverage and appear as a special guest on the reality show The Farmer Wants a Wife when it returned in 2022.

In February 2023, the Seven Network announced that Armytage would host the new season of The Farmer Wants a Wife.

==== Sunrise and Weekend Sunrise ====
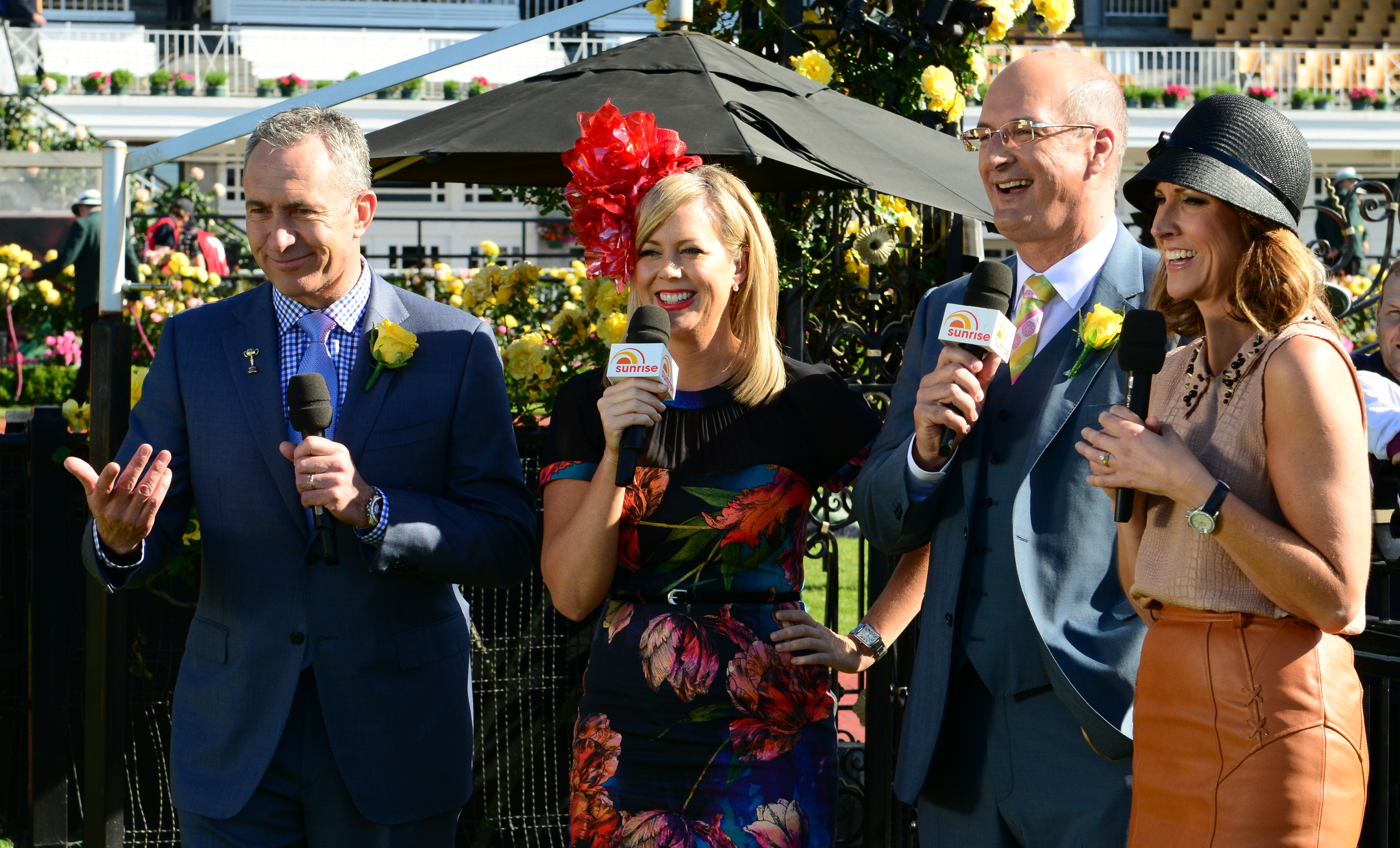
Armytage (second from left) with other Sunrise presenters at the 2013 Melbourne Cup

In June 2007, Armytage was appointed co-host of Weekend Sunrise alongside Andrew O'Keefe, replacing Lisa Wilkinson who moved to Today on the Nine Network.

In June 2013, Armytage was announced as the replacement for Sunrise co-host Melissa Doyle; she began her position that September.

In March 2015, Armytage was accused of racism in an on-air interview after congratulating a woman for looking whiter than her twin. After an online petition was signed by over 2,000 people calling for her to apologise, she did so.

In March 2018, Armytage hosted a segment on Sunrise focusing on Aboriginal adoption, during which she incorrectly claimed that Aboriginal children could not be fostered by White people and stated that "Post-Stolen Generation, there's been a huge move to leave Aboriginal children where they are, even if they're being neglected in their own families." Protests were held outside the Sunrise studio in Martin Place in response to the segment. In September 2018, the Australian Communications and Media Authority (ACMA) ruled that the segment had breached the Commercial Television Industry Code of Practice as it contained inaccurate statements and "strong negative generalisations about Indigenous people as a group". In June 2020, Armytage was sued for racial vilification over the segment. Following the found-proven breach, ACMA-ordered an on-air apology, and for Channel 7 staff to undergo cultural training; the subsequent Sunrise response was considered "compliance, there was no genuine contrition".

On 8 March 2021, Armytage announced her resignation from Sunrise to spend more time with her family. Her final show was on 11 March 2021.

=== Nine Network ===
In September 2024, it was rumoured Armytage had signed a deal to join the Nine Network. In October 2024, this was confirmed as Armytage was announced as host of Nine's upcoming adaptation of The Golden Bachelor.

In December 2024, Armytage filled in for Sarah Abo as co-host on Today. The Nine Network announced in November 2025 that Armytage would again fill in for Abo during the holiday season.

=== Other ===
In 2017, Armytage joined News Corp Australia lifestyle magazine Stellar as a columnist. In collaboration with Stellar, she launched her own podcast called Something to Talk About with Samantha Armytage in February 2021.

== Personal life ==
In June 2020, Armytage announced her engagement to partner Richard Lavender. They were married in a private ceremony in the Southern Highlands on 31 December 2020. Armytage became a stepmother to Lavender's two daughters from his previous marriage. In December 2024, it was announced that Armytage had separated from Lavender.

== Sources ==
- "Funny side of life for popular TV host". smh.com.au. 2 July 2013.
- "Russell Crowe and Samantha Armytage flirt their way through Channel 7 set". dailytelegraph.com.au. Archived from the original on 27 June 2013.
- "Lessons of television breakfast chemistry". news.com.au. Archived from the original on 20 July 2013.
- "Fitzy and Wippa's 'naked prank' on Sunrise host Samantha Armytage slammed as 'offensive'". The Courier-Mail.
