= Monique Wright =

Australian journalist and television presenter

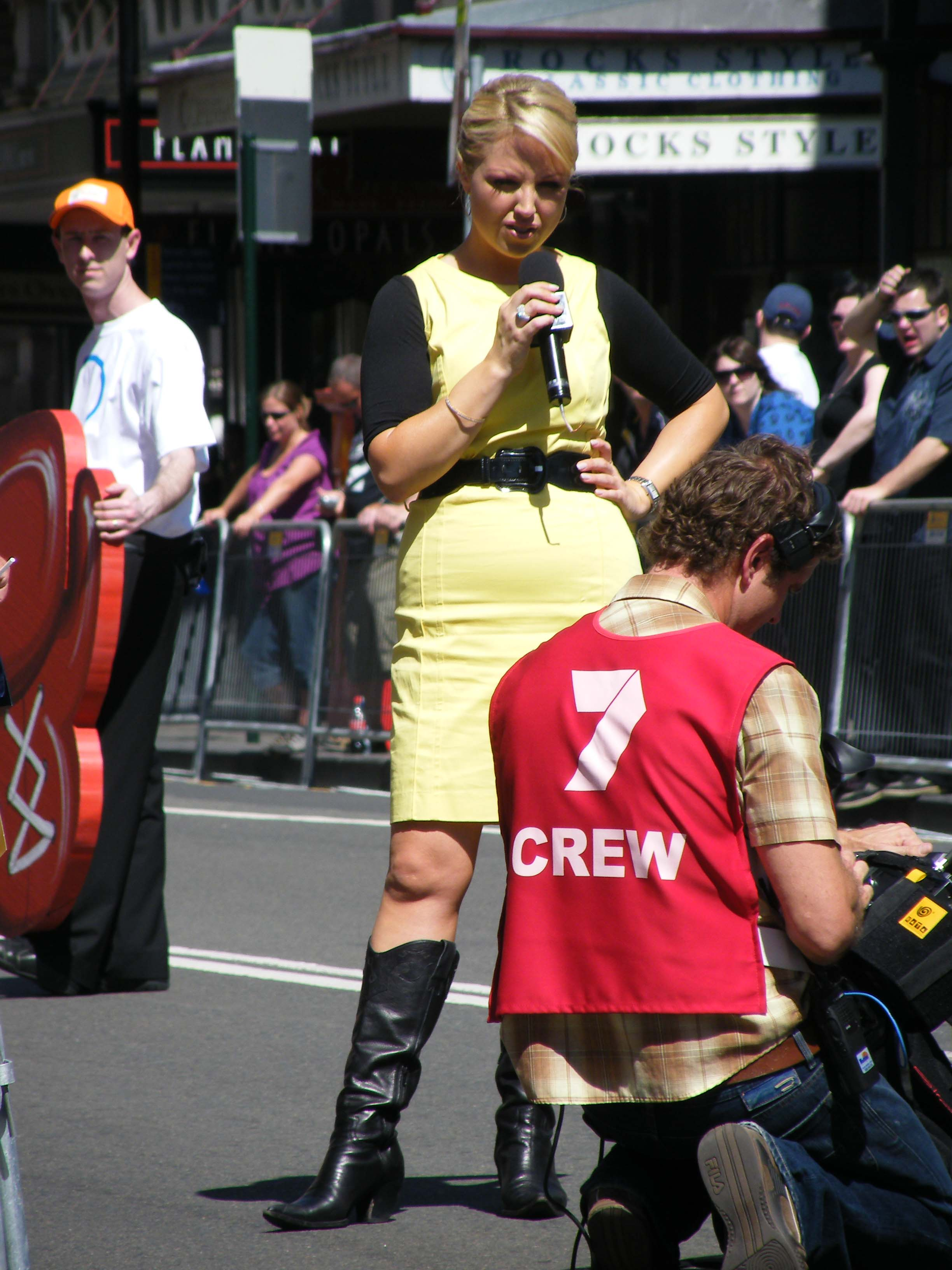
- Monique Wright reporting on the 2008 Olympic parade
- Born: 18 May 1973 (age 53); Sydney, Australia
- Occupations: Weekend Sunrise co-host (2013–present); The Daily Edition host (2013–2015)
- Years active: 1996–present
- Employer: Seven Network
- Spouse: Tim Scanlan (2008 - 2021)
- Children: 3

Monique Wright (born 18 May 1973) is an Australian journalist and television presenter.

Wright is currently co-host with David Woiwod of breakfast program Weekend Sunrise .

== Career ==
Wright joined the Seven Network as a reporter in 1996 and has covered politics, human interest stories, celeb interviews, royal weddings and Olympic Games, including for Sunday Night.

In 2007, she was appointed weather presenter on the Seven Network's national breakfast program, Sunrise, replacing Grant Denyer. She remained in the role for a year before being replaced by meteorologist David Brown.

In June 2013, Wright was announced as a co-host of The Daily Edition. She remained with the show until 2015, when she was replaced by Ryan Phelan.

In August 2013, Wright temporarily replaced Samantha Armytage as co-host on Weekend Sunrise. In February 2014, she was officially appointed co-host of the show.
