= Ryan Phelan =

Australian sports broadcaster

- Born: 7 June 1975 (age 51); Ayr, Queensland, Australia
- Occupations: Television presenter, reporter and media personality
- Children: 2

Ryan Phelan is an Australian television journalist, media personality and presenter.

Phelan has previously presented news updates on The Morning Show and was co-host of The Daily Edition.

== Career ==
Phelan's television career started in the late '90's as a presenter for Sky Racing where, amongst other things, his duties included spruiking the 'firmers' and the things paying 'overs'.

He went on to host Network Ten's Sports Tonight every weeknight from 2002 until 2006. He then went to Foxtel to host various sporting shows, including NRL on Fox, Monday Night Football, Super Saturday coverage and ESPN Sports Centre.

He also did some work on radio on Sky Radio's Big Sports Breakfast and a weekend sports show on Classic Rock with Wendell Sailor and 2GB's Sunday Session with Darryl Brohman.

In 2013, Phelan joined the Seven Network and was appointed weekend sports presenter for Sydney's Seven News. He remained in this role until April 2016, after which he moved to presenting the sport on Seven Morning News and news updates on The Morning Show. He also became a co-host on The Daily Edition alongside Sally Obermeder.

Phelan was also winner of Cleo Magazine's 2005 Bachelor of the Year Award voted by the public.

In June 2020, Phelan was charged with assault occasioning actual bodily harm and common assault following a complaint made to police by his girlfriend. He was subsequently sacked by the Seven Network on 22 June 2020. Original co-host Tom Williams returned to co-present the final three episodes of The Daily Edition with Obermeder, while Angela Cox (Mondays to Thursdays) and Sally Bowrey (Fridays) replaced him in presenting the news updates on The Morning Show. The charges levelled against Phelan were dropped by police due to "incontrovertible evidence" proving his innocence.
