= The Morning Show (TV program) =

Morning TV news program in Australia

- Genre: Morning show; Infotainment; Talk show; Live performances
- Created by: Adam Boland
- Presented by: Larry Emdur; Kylie Gillies
- Country of origin: Australia
- Original language: English
- No. of seasons: 16
- No. of episodes: 2,000+

Production
- Executive producers: Chloe Flynn (2022–present); Sarah Stinson (2010–2022); Adam Boland (2007–2010)
- Production locations: Martin Place, New South Wales (2007–2023); Television City, South Eveleigh, New South Wales (2023–present)
- Running time: 180 minutes (Weekdays); 120 minutes (Weekends)

Original release
- Network: Seven Network
- Release: 18 June 2007 – present

Related
- 11AM (1975–1999); Sunrise; Weekend Sunrise

The Morning Show is an Australian morning talk show broadcast on the Seven Network and currently hosted by Kylie Gillies and Larry Emdur. The show airs between 9:00 am and 12:00 pm on weekdays and follows Seven's breakfast news program Sunrise, with both programs closely interlinked. The program features infotainment, celebrity interviews and live music performances.

On weekends, a highlights show is aired between 10:00 am and 12:00 pm on Saturday and Sunday featuring segments from the week.

== History ==
The show premiered on the Seven Network on 18 June 2007 and originally aired between 9:00 am and 11:00 am on weekdays. Adam Boland was the original executive producer of the show and promised to deliver a mix of news and views, new music and regular segments covering health and fitness, astrology, celebrity gossip, cooking, counselling and fashion. Boland built the show on the success of Sunrise which he also produced.

In March 2012, The Morning Show extended to a weekend with highlights of the week airing on Saturdays and Sundays after Weekend Sunrise. During the AFL season The Morning Show was not shown on Sundays in Victoria, Tasmania, South Australia and Western Australia due to AFL Game Day being shown in those states, until 2020 when AFL Game Day was axed as a result of the COVID-19 pandemic. Since then it is shown on Sundays during the football season Except in WA if a West Coast Eagles or Fremantle Dockers game is scheduled to start at 11 am.

On 15 December 2014, The Morning Show was live to air as the 2014 Sydney hostage crisis occurred across Martin Place from their Seven Network studio. The program continued to broadcast live pictures from their studio's windows, before all staff (including co-hosts Emdur and Gillies) were forced to evacuate the building, with the network's news coverage switching to the station's Melbourne newsroom where Nick Etchells anchored rolling coverage.

On 24 July 2023, The Morning Show hosted its first broadcast at its new studio base in Television City, South Eveleigh. The first edition went to air live from 9 am with Larry Emdur and Kylie Gillies, following the first broadcast of Sunrise from the new studio location. Joining Seven News, Seven News Spotlight, The Latest and 7news.com.au, for the first time in more than 40 years the entire Seven Sydney operation and its broadcast and operational staff across all departments were based in the same production location. With these changes, the show received a rebranding along with Sunrise.

In November 2024, Seven Network announced that The Morning Show will extend 30 minutes to 12pm from 2025.

== Ratings ==
The debut episode averaged 272,000 viewers, beating both 9am with David and Kim (147,000) and Mornings with Kerri Anne (126,000). Since its launch in June 2007 the show has rated first nearly every week against the Nine Network and Network Ten. The program did not lose a day until 31 October 2012, when it was beaten by Mornings, and did not lose a week until March 2016, when it was beaten by Today Extra.

== Format ==
The show's format is similar to Sunrise and consists of a mix of news, entertainment and lifestyle. The show also features live and prerecorded advertorials similar to those featured in rival show Today Extra. The show is broadcast live at the same studio.

When the show first started out there was a fixed music theme used regularly throughout the show. In 2010, the theme was scrapped with more popular recent music being now used as bumpers.

== Presenters ==
| Presenter | Role | Tenure |
|---|---|---|
| Larry Emdur | Co-host | 2007–present |
| Kylie Gillies | Co-host | 2007–present |

=== Former presenters ===
| Presenter | Role | Tenure |
|---|---|---|
| Ann Sanders | News | 2007–2015 |
| Ryan Phelan | News | 2016–2020 |
| Angela Cox | News | 2020–2022 |
| Glenn Wheeler | Infomercials | 2007–2015 |

=== Fill-in presenters ===
Current presenters who have been fill-in hosts or co-hosts of The Morning Show in recent times include Angela Cox, Sally Bowrey, Sam Mac, Natarsha Belling, Monique Wright, David Woiwod, Dr Chris Brown, Phil Burton and Edwina Bartholomew.

=== Advertorial presenters ===
- Karen Ledbury
- Jamie Malcolm

=== Former advertorial presenters ===
- Glenn Wheeler
- John Burgess
- Leah McLeod
- Brodie Young

== Logo history ==
2007–2011

2012–2023

2023–present
