= Chris O'Keefe =

Australian journalist

- Born: 4 July 1981 (age 45); Sydney, New South Wales, Australia
- Occupations: Journalist, radio host
- Years active: 2008–2024
- Known for: reporter for Nine News, hosting afternoon drive on 2GB
- Notable work: Bankstown Hospital (2016); Ruby Princess (2020)
- Spouse: Yvonne Sampson
- Children: 1

Chris O'Keefe (born 4 July 1981) is an Australian former journalist and radio host.

He is best known for his work with Nine Entertainment, as a reporter for Nine News, and as a presenter for Nine Radio's Sydney station 2GB.

== Career ==
O'Keefe began his career in 2008 with an internship at St George and Sutherland Shire Leader before moving to television in 2010 as a reporter for Ten News on the Gold Coast.

O'Keefe joined the Nine Network as a reporter for Nine News on the Gold Coast in 2012, before moving to Brisbane in 2013 as a police reporter for Nine News Queensland.

In 2014, O'Keefe relocated back to Sydney when he became a political reporter for Nine News Sydney.

During his time at Nine, O'Keefe has appeared on Today and has been a fill-in presenter on A Current Affair. When long-serving A Current Affair host Tracy Grimshaw announced her retirement in 2022, O'Keefe was considered to be one of the front runners to be announced as her permanent replacement.

However, in November 2022 O'Keefe was named as the new presenter of the 2GB afternoon drive program following the departure of Jim Wilson. Prior to being announced the permanent host of the 2GB afternoon drive program, O'Keefe had been a fill-in presenter on the show throughout 2022.

O'Keefe started his new permanent role at 2GB on 9 January 2023.

In the lead-up to the 2023 Australian Indigenous Voice referendum, O'Keefe supported the Yes campaign, disagreeing with leading 2GB presenter Ben Fordham.

In 2024, O'Keefe resigned from 2GB and quit media to start a political advocacy company. His last show aired on 13 December 2024.

== Awards ==
As a police reporter for Nine News Queensland, O'Keefe was recognised by the Gold Coast Media Club in 2014 for his story on the Broadbeach Bikie Brawl in October 2013.

In 2016, he won a Walkley Award in the Television/Audio-Visual: News Reporting category, beating out Network 10's Waleed Aly and the Seven Network's Robert Ovadia. O'Keefe received the Walkley Award for his work exposing gross negligence at Bankstown Hospital after a fatal mix-up resulted in nitrous oxide being administered to a newborn baby instead of oxygen.

In 2017, O'Keefe received four Kennedy Awards. He was named "Journalist of the Year" and "Outstanding Political Journalist" and also received "the Harry Potter Award for Outstanding Television News Reporting" and "the Rebecca Wilson Award for Scoop of the Year".

O'Keefe received a Kennedy Award in 2020 for "outstanding political journalism" for his coverage of the Ruby Princess.

== Personal life ==
O'Keefe grew up in the St George area of Sydney where he began attending St Joseph's Catholic School in Oatley in 1994. He later attended Waverley College, graduating in 2006.

He married sports broadcaster Yvonne Sampson in October 2018 at Bowral, New South Wales. They had announced their engagement the previous year after dating for more than three years. Their son was born in March 2022.
