= Glenn Butcher =

Australian actor and writer

- Born: Glenn Donald Butcher; 16 September 1961 (age 64); Murwillumbah, New South Wales, Australia
- Occupations: Actor, writer
- Years active: 1987−present
- Known for: Full Frontal; Soft Fruit; Young Einstein; Fisk

Glenn Donald Butcher (born 16 September 1961) is an Australian actor and writer.

== Career ==
=== The Castanet Club ===
Butcher first came to prominence as a member of the cult Newcastle-based comedy musical troupe The Castanet Club (1982–1991), in which he played parodic lounge singer Lance Norton. Alongside Butcher, The Castanet Club featured a number of other noted performers who gained prominence in various areas of the Australian media, including Stephen Abbott (aka The Sandman), Mikey Robbins, Angela Moore (aka Shirley Purvis), Penny Biggins, actor-writer-director Warren Coleman and Maynard.

=== Television ===
Butcher was a regular cast member of the popular TV sketch comedy series Full Frontal (1993–1997), as well as hosting Play School and appearing in the films Soft Fruit and Young Einstein. He starred in the 2005 television movie, Da Kath & Kim Code and the 2012 comedy film, Kath & Kimderella. In 2020, Butcher was announced as part of the cast for legal comedy Fisk, starring Kitty Flanagan, Butcher would return for the third series of Fisk.

== Filmography ==
=== Film ===
| Year | Title | Role | Notes |
|---|---|---|---|
| 2013 | Three Corpse Dinner | Dracula | Short film |
| 2013 | The 8 Inch Pinch | Wildlife Officer | Short film |
| 2012 | Kath & Kimderella | Sergio | Feature film |
| 2009 | Street Angel | Doctor Pangea | Short film |
| 2005 | Da Kath & Kim Code | Rental Car Agent | TV movie |
| 2003 | Fat Pizza | Priest | Feature film |
| 1999 | Soft Fruit | Tony | Feature film |
| 1991 | The Castanet Club | Lance | Feature film |
| 1989 | Future Past | Gospel Singer | TV movie |
| 1988 | Young Einstein | Ernest Rutherford | Feature film |

=== Television ===
| Year | Title | Role | Notes |
|---|---|---|---|
| 2021–present | Fisk | Viktor | 11 episodes |
| 2012 | Packed to the Rafters | Roger Wiseman | 1 episode |
| 2002–04 | Kath & Kim | Maitre'D / Commonwealth Games Committee / Barman | 3 episodes |
| 2003 | White Collar Blue | Theo's Doctor | 1 episode |
| 1998 | The Micallef P(r)ogram(me) | Various characters | 1 episode |
| 1997–2000 | Play School | Host | 23 episodes |
| 1993–97 | Full Frontal | Various characters | 107 episodes |
| 1996 | Shaun Micallef's World Around Him | Various | TV special |
| 1991 | Fast Forward | Various characters | 5 episodes |
| 1990 | Tuesday Night Live: The Big Gig | Lance Norton | 1 episode |
| 1989 | A Country Practice | Lachlan Spencer | 1 episode |
| 1988 | Swap Shop | | TV series |

== Theatre ==
=== As actor ===
| Year | Title | Role | Notes |
|---|---|---|---|
| 1979 | The Miracle Worker | James Keller | Civic Playhouse, Newcastle with Hunter Valley Theatre Company |
| 1979 | Under Milk Wood | | Civic Playhouse, Newcastle with Hunter Valley Theatre Company |
| 1980 | Black Comedy | Brindsley | West End Theatre Club, Newcastle |
| 1980 | Dracula | Renfield | West End Theatre Club, Newcastle |
| 1981 | Treasure Island | | Fort Scratchley, Newcastle |
| 1981 | Rafferty Rules | | Newcastle schools tour |
| 1981; 1982 | Red Earth | | Newcastle schools tour, Newcastle City Hall, Jesmond Centre, Jesmond with Freewheels Theatre Company |
| 1981 | Yule Play it Again | | Piccardi Restaurant, Newcastle with Hunter Valley Theatre Company |
| 1982 | Until Ya Say Ya Love Me | | Newcastle schools tour, Wood Street Theatre, Newcastle with Magpie Theatre Company & Freewheels Theatre Company |
| 1982 | They Came from the Fun Dimension | Wayne Slazenger | Wood Street Theatre with Freewheels Theatre Company for Newcastle Mattara Festival |
| 1982 | Howzatt | | Wood Street Theatre, Newcastle |
| 1992 | The Rocky Horror Show | | Her Majesty's Theatre, Adelaide, Her Majesty's Theatre, Sydney |
| 1993 | By Jingo, It's Bingo | | Playhouse, Newcastle |
| 1995 | By Jingo, It's Bingo / Anthony Morgan | | Bondi Pavilion, Sydney for Sydney Fringe Festival |
| 1996 | The New Rocky Horror Show | Brad Majors | Lyric Theatre, Brisbane, Newcastle Civic Theatre with Paul Dainty Productions |
| 1998 | Follies | | Sydney Opera House for Sydney Gay and Lesbian Mardi Gras |
| 2001 | Kid Stakes | Roo | Arts Theatre, Adelaide with Adelaide Repertory Theatre Inc |
| 2001; 2002 | Singin’ in the Rain | | Lyric Theatre, Sydney, Festival Theatre, Adelaide |
| 2002; 2003 | Barrackers | | Comics Lounge, Melbourne, Prince Alfred Hotel, Melbourne for Melbourne International Comedy Festival |
| 2006 | Dusty – The Original Pop Diva | Mr O'Brien | State Theatre, Melbourne, Lyric Theatre, Sydney, Burswood Theatre, Perth, Festival Theatre, Adelaide, Lyric Theatre, Brisbane |
| 2008 | The Convict’s Opera | Convicts’ Director / John Gay | Sydney Theatre for STC & Out of Joint Theatre Company |
| 2010 | Sung Like a Horse | | The Stables, Adelaide with Accidental Productions for Adelaide Fringe Festival |
| 2015 | The Goodbye Girl | Mark / various roles | Hayes Theatre Company with Neglected Musicals |
| 2016; 2017 | Kinky Boots | Mr Price | Her Majesty's Theatre, Melbourne, Capitol Theatre, Sydney |

=== As crew ===
| Year | Title | Role | Notes |
|---|---|---|---|
| 1990; 1991 | The Headbutt | Director | Playhouse, Newcastle, Belvoir Street Theatre, Sydney |
| 1992 | The Coast Mongrels | Musical Director | Playhouse, Newcastle with Hunter Valley Theatre Company |
