= Steve Abbott (comedian) =

Australian comedian and author (born 1956)

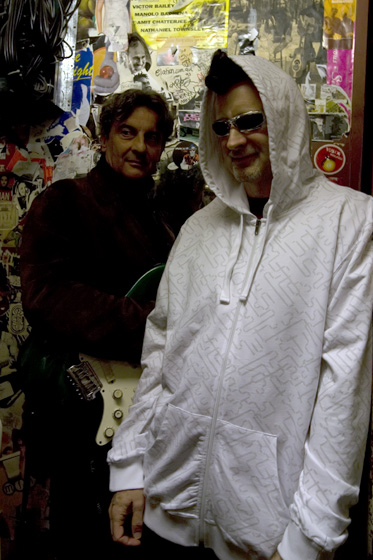
- Steve Abbott (background) and Paul Livingston
- Born: Stephen Abbott; 24 March 1956 (age 70); Broken Hill, New South Wales, Australia
- Other name: The Sandman

Stephen Abbott (born 24 March 1956) is an Australian comedian and author, also known under the comedic moniker of The Sandman or occasionally Sandy.

== Career ==
Abbott is an Australian comedian, actor, author, poet, screenwriter and musician.

He played guitar in the band The Castanet Club together with fellow performers Glenn Butcher, Mikey Robins, Angela Moore, Maynard and long-time collaborator Warren Coleman. The band was formed in Newcastle in 1982, and members each adopted a persona for their performances, Abbott's being 'Johnny Goodman'. The Castanet Club toured all around Australia, performed at the Edinburgh Festival, and featured in the film The Castanet Club: A Movie You Can Dance To.

Abbott evolved his Johnny Goodman character into 'The Sandman' for Australian radio and television throughout the nineties. The Sandman appeared regularly from 1993 to 2000 on Australian national youth radio as a breakfast host and performer.

Abbott has written a number of plays including The Headbutt (which he co-directed with Neil Armfield for Belvoir Street Theatre). He has also written several books, comedy CDs and radio comedy series, and hosted two comedy variety TV series for SBS.

In 2004 Abbott co-produced, wrote and appeared in Sandman in Siberia, a documentary in which he and his mother (Evelyn Abbott) return to their ancestral home in Siberia in an attempt to reunite with long lost cousins (one of the highest rating programs of the year on Australia's SBS Network).

Together with Warren Coleman, Abbott has written several feature screenplays, including The Infernal Optimist (2007) based on Linda Jaivin’s novel, Birdbrain loosely based on his ABC radio podcast, and The Day We Lost The H-Bomb based on Barbara Moran’s book. They both worked on the screenplay of the animated feature The Legend of the Underzoo in Canada. The pair also created the children’s live-action feature Stripey and the animated feature Super Space Rabbits. Additionally, they collaborated with songwriter Dave Faulkner of the Hoodoo Gurus on the book version of the They're a Weird Mob musical.

== Bibliography ==
- The Sandman (1995). Sandman's Advice to the Unpopular. ABC books. ISBN 978-0-7333-0450-7.
- The Sandman (1996). This Is My Surfboard. ABC books. ISBN 0-7333-0534-2.
- Observations from a Moving Vehicle (1998) ABC Books ISBN 0-7333-0579-2
- Big Man's World (1998) with Tony Squires and Mikey Robins
- Pleasant Avenue (1999) ABC Books ISBN 0-7333-0686-1
- 204 Bell Street (2000)
- Sandman's Uncertain Years (2001)
- Diary of a Bus Clown (2002)
- Abbott, Steve (2005). Sandman in Siberia. ABC books. ISBN 978-0-7333-1480-3.

== Filmography ==
=== Film ===
Year	Title	Role	Type
1988	Young Einstein	Brian Asprin	Feature film
1990	The Castanet Club	Johnny Goodman	Film
1996	Children of the Revolution	Malenkov	Feature film
2003	You Can't Stop The Murders		Feature film
2004	The Scree		Film

=== Television ===
Year	Title	Role	Type
1993	The Comedy Sale		TV series
1996	Good News Week	The Sandman	TV series
1998	Good News Weekend	The Sandman	TV series
1999	GNW Night Lite	The Sandman	TV series
2000	The Fat		TV series
2004–05	In Siberia Tonight	Host	TV series
2005	Sandman in Siberia	The Sandman	Documentary
2005	Under the Grandstand		TV series during Ashes in England
2007	The Sideshow with Paul McDermott		TV series

== Discography ==
- This is my Surfboard (released as a book simultaneously)
- 204 Bell St
- Pleasant Avenue
- Castanet Club (1986)
- Johnny Goodman (1988)
- Showbag by The Musical Flags (c1981)
