= Mel McLaughlin =

Australian sports television presenter (born 1979)

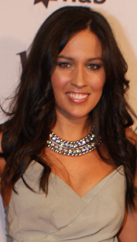
- McLaughlin in 2011
- Born: Melanie Louise McLaughlin; 3 September 1979 (age 47); Sydney, New South Wales, Australia
- Occupation: Sports presenter
- Years active: 2003−present
- Employer(s): Seven Network; Optus Sport
- Known for: Seven News; Big Bash League
- Spouse: Luke Panic (2012–2014)
- Partner: Ashley Westwood

Melanie Louise McLaughlin (born 3 September 1979) is an Australian sports presenter for the Seven Network. McLaughlin previously worked for Fox Sports where she hosted association football shows including Kick Off, Indian Super League and Fox Sports FC, while also being a regular on Fox Sports News.

== Career ==
McLaughlin started her media career with Radio 2 in 2005 before moving to Sky News in Sydney, as a reporter and presenter.

In 2007, she joined Fox Sports where she hosted multiple soccer shows including Kick Off, Indian Super League and Fox Sports FC. She was a regular on Fox Sports News.

In 2013, she joined Network Ten to host the network's coverage of the Big Bash League. She also hosted Ten's coverage of the 2014 Winter Olympics, 2014 Commonwealth Games and Australian F1 Grand Prix. McLaughlin was also host of the short-lived The Thursday Night Sport Show alongside Sam Mac and Mark Howard, and a fill-in sports presenter on Ten Eyewitness News Sydney.

In January 2016, cricketer Chris Gayle propositioned McLaughlin during a live interview during a Big Bash game. He was sanctioned with a A$10,000 fine for inappropriate conduct.

In April 2016, McLaughlin moved to the Seven Network. She was appointed weeknight sport presenter on Seven News Sydney replacing Jim Wilson. She hosted Seven's coverage of the 2016 Summer Olympics, 2018 Winter Olympics and the 2018 Commonwealth Games, as well as the network's coverage of the Australian Swimming Championships and 2017 Rugby League World Cup. She has also filled in as sports presenter on Sunrise and on Seven Morning News.

In 2018, she was appointed host of Seven's test cricket and Big Bash League Coverage alongside James Brayshaw.

== Personal life ==
McLaughlin was born in September 1979 in Sydney to an Anglo-Indian mother and an English father who had migrated to Australia in 1978.

She was raised in Quakers Hill, New South Wales where she attended St Andrew's Primary School and St John Paul II Catholic College.

McLaughlin was married to Australian actor Luke Panic from 2012 to 2014. She is currently in a relationship with British former footballer Ashley Westwood. McLaughlin is an ambassador for the Lung Foundation Australia, having lost a sister to lung cancer.

=== Health ===
McLaughlin was diagnosed with lung cancer in December 2025.
