= Face to Face (Australian TV program) =

- Genre: Talk show
- Country of origin: Australia
- Original language: English
- No. of seasons: 4

Original release
- Network: Seven Network
- Release: 19 November 1995 – 1998

Face to Face was a Sunday morning political talk program. It first ran on Network Ten in August 1988 and was hosted by the then Political Editor Kerry O'Brien and produced by Chris Doig. The program was originally broadcast from the studios of CTC Canberra, ATV Melbourne and TEN Sydney – each with identical sets. Network Ten cancelled the program in 1989.

Face to Face premiered on 31 July 1988 with Kerry O'Brien as the host. It went head-to-head with the second hour of Sunday on Nine Network. According to The Sun-Herald, when it first aired, the show was the sole politics-focused television show. The show was executive produced by Gary O'Neill, directed by Glyn Patrick, produced by Kerry-Anne Walsh, and senior technical produced by Chris Doig. The prime minister, Bob Hawke, watched the show. O'Brien hosted the show for the last time on 5 November 1989. The Sydney Morning Herald called O'Brien's run on the show "moderately successful".

From 19 November 1995 and in 1999 Face to Face became a segment of Sunday Sunrise on the Seven Network.

In November 1995 assumed a format closer to its origins as a small-budget national political interview show, which featured an interview with a guest about the week's most important national issue. It aired late Sunday night (following the Sunday night movie) hosted by Neil Mercer.

In October 1996, the show moved to Sunday mornings and began screening live at 8.30 am, up against Network Ten's Meet the Press and the second half of Nine Network's Business Sunday. Guests were interviewed live in the studio, instead of pre-recording.

In 1997, Stan Grant became the host until mid year when Chris Bath took over. In 1998, Bath moved to Witness and Glenn Milne took over.

In 1999 it became a segment of Sunday Sunrise and ceased to be a stand-alone programme. During that year the segments changed from being live with Glenn Milne (flown to Sydney each every Sunday) to being a Friday night pre-record by Stan Grant.
