= Bruce Wilson (journalist) =

Australian journalist (1941–2006)

Bruce Wilson (10 May 1941 – 3 January 2006) was an Australian journalist, best known as a commentator on rugby union.

He was known mostly for his sports journalism, throughout his five-decade career writing articles on cricket and rugby events with The Herald, The Sun and the Herald Sun, mostly as a foreign correspondent. He also travelled to areas such as the Middle East and South Vietnam as part of his journalism career.

== Family ==
Wilson died from cancer on 3 January 2006, and is survived by his fourth wife, Clare Hardman, whom he met and married in London, and his two surviving children: Former Seven Network broadcaster and journalist Jim Wilson and freelance features journalist Lizzie Wilson https://www.nowtolove.com.au/author/lizzie-wilson/. His eldest daughter, News Limited sports journalist and radio/television personality Rebecca Wilson, died in October 2016.
