= The Castanet Club (film) =

- Directed by: Neil Armfield
- Produced by: Glenys Rowe
- Starring: Steve Abbott; Glenn Butcher; Mikey Robins; Maynard
- Cinematography: Ray Argall
- Edited by: Bill Russo
- Release date: 4 April 1991
- Running time: 85 minutes
- Country: Australia
- Language: English
- Budget: A$1.5 million (approx.)
- Box office: A$25,100 (Australia)

The Castanet Club is a 1991 Australian live concert film starring the popular Newcastle cabaret troupe, The Castanet Club.

== Plot ==
The premise is that the North Bondi RSL have sold out a performance by Col Joye, but realise on the day that they forgot to actually book him. They need to find a cheap replacement quickly, so they contact "that Newcastle mob, the Castanet Club" because "you can't get much cheaper than that". After a brief "gathering the band" sequence set in various locations around Newcastle, and a road trip to Sydney, the band arrive in North Bondi. The rest of the movie is a live Castanet Club concert at the North Bondi RSL.

== Cast ==
- Steve Abbott as Johnny Goodman
- Angela Moore as Betty Plate / Shirley Purvis
- Warren Coleman as Bowling Man
- Penny Biggins as Doris Crawley
- Peter Mahoney as Urman Erstwhile
- Glenn Butcher as Lance Norton / Darren Purvis
- Kathy Bluff as Kid Paganini
- Russell Cheek as Tron Wexler / Douggie 'Gargoyle' Ormerod
- Glenn Keenan as Pastor Noel Anderson
- Mikey Robins as Elvis Presle
- Maynard as Maynard F# Crabbes
- Rodney Cambridge as Self
- George Cambridge as Self
- Max Abbott as Self
- Lana Caruso as Self
- Leslie Fountain as Self
- Lyn Smith as Hairdresser
- Kylie Thomas

== Production ==
The Castanet Club was directed by Neil Armfield and produced by Glenys Rowe with Central Park Films.

The film was fully funded by the Australian Film Commission, with a reported budget of approximately A$1.5 million. In order to bypass funding rules that prohibited the financing of live stage recordings, it was presented as a comedy documentary.

== Release ==
The film screened at St Petersburg International Film Festival "Festival of Festivals" in 1990. It was officially released in Australian cinemas on 4 April 1991. The group itself, however, parted ways that same year, after nine years together. The film later screened at the Verona Film Festival in 1992.

At the Australian box office, the film grossed A$25,100.

A half-hour documentary titled The Castanet Club Story was released online on 21 October 2021, as the seventh film in a series created as part of a Stories of Our Town project. The documentary was created to coincide with an exhibition at the Newcastle Museum.

== Reception ==
David Stratton of At the Movies said: "The film is well shot by camera team headed by Ray Argall, and for fans of the Castanets – whose humor is very Australian – it will be a must see."

== See also ==
- Cinema of Australia
