= SportsNight =

There have been several television shows named SportsNight or Sports Night:

- SportsNight with James Bracey, an Australian television sports news and commentary program
- Sportsnight, a British television sports program
- Sports Night, an American television comedy-drama series
