= Chris Bath =

Australian journalist, radio and television presenter and news anchor

- Born: Christine Bath; 13 May 1967 (age 59); Auburn, New South Wales
- Education: Sydney University; Charles Sturt University
- Occupations: Journalist; radio news presenter; television newsreader; weather presenter; reporter
- Years active: 1988−present
- Employer: ABC
- Spouse: Jim Wilson (m. 2012)
- Children: 1

Christine Bath (born 13 May 1967) is an Australian journalist, radio and television presenter and news anchor.

She has previously been host of the Drive show on ABC Radio Sydney (2025), 10 News Weekend on Network 10, Evenings on ABC Radio Sydney from 2017 to 2019, and has previously been a weekend presenter of Seven News in Sydney and host of the Seven Network's current affairs program Sunday Night, until she left the network on 27 July 2015.

== Personal life ==
Bath was born in Auburn in Sydney's western suburbs and raised in South Wentworthville. She attended Holroyd High School. Later, she enrolled at Sydney University where, in 1985, she studied English, psychology, German and legal institutions for two months before leaving. She started working at a restaurant in Surry Hills and became a trainee manager at Kmart, Merrylands – a position which she reportedly left because they would not let her make jokes while announcing red light specials.

In 1997, Bath married composer Denis Carnahan and in late 2000 Bath gave birth to a son. In 2008, after 10 years of marriage Bath and Carnahan separated.

In January 2012, Bath married Seven News sport presenter and reporter Jim Wilson, only weeks after Wilson asked Bath to marry, but some four years into their relationship. The couple was featured in New Idea magazine in late August 2013.

== Career ==
On the advice of the Sydney Morning Herald columnist Peter Bowers, Bath applied to study communications at Mitchell College (now Charles Sturt University) in Bathurst. Not only was she accepted into the course, she also won a scholarship, and majored in politics. During her studies she was a broadcaster with the on-campus community radio station 2MCE-FM. In 1988, halfway through the last year of her three-year course, she was offered a job at Sydney AM radio station 2UE as a cadet reporter and newsreader.

Her second job came a year later, after a friend encouraged her to apply for a job with a regional television station in Albury. She moved to Albury, where she spent the next 20 months working at Prime Television station AMV-4 and spending her weekends in Melbourne. At AMV-4, she started reporting, was the weather presenter for a while, then finished off as the full-time newsreader.

In 1991, at 23, she joined Newcastle's NBN Television, where she stayed for the next five years as a reporter and host to the evening local news broadcast. Originally she thought she was going there as just a reporter, but the newsreader resigned and they offered the vacant position to her. She resigned from NBN Newcastle in late 1995 after being offered a job by Seven in Sydney. NBN took Bath to the Supreme Court to delay her appearance on Seven. The court granted an injunction against her appearing on Seven before 1 February 1996.

=== Seven Network ===
Before becoming presenter for Seven's Morning News, Bath has previously had numerous presenting roles with the network over the years.

In 1996 until early 1997, she co-hosted the 6am news bulletin with Peter Ford (which later became Sunrise). In 1997, she became host of the network's Sunday morning political interview show, Face to Face, and presenter of Seven's Late News. (The Late News was subsequently axed in August 2003.)

For three weeks in mid-1997, Bath was working 18-hour days, filling in as host of 11AM, presenting the afternoon news updates, recording the news bulletin shown on Ansett flights and presenting the 11pm Late News bulletin.

In 1998, Bath was a reporter for Witness, the network's flagship current affairs program, until it was axed later that year. Seven then asked Bath to co-host its new current affairs show, Dateline, with Stan Grant. She declined and was given the role of presenting the Sydney 6pm news over summer.

In 1999, she returned to the Seven Late News, as well as reading afternoon news bulletins on Sydney radio station 2WS from May. In July, she did a now infamous interview with Sydney newspaper The Daily Telegraph which did not sit well with management. Among other things, she said she'd "refused to work on" Today Tonight and was the "only presenter" at Seven writing her own updates. Outside the news, she appeared as a guest panellist on Geoffrey Robertson's Hypotheticals in October, and on 31 December she hosted the network's New Year's Eve coverage.

In 2000, Bath was part of Seven's host team for the Sydney 2000 Olympic Games, including a spot on Olympic Sunrise. In August, she carried the Olympic Torch in Newcastle. Bath was then given the honour of co-hosting the prelude to the Opening Ceremony live on stage at the Olympic Stadium, while seven months pregnant with her first child.

After having son Darcy in late 2000, she returned to political interviewing in 2001 as presenter of Sunday Sunrise and stayed for three years, as well as presenting Sydney's weekend 6pm news bulletin until 2004 (including an extended bulletin live from Bali on 12 October 2003). In 2001, she also co-hosted part of the networks Federal Election coverage on 10 November.

In 2005, Bath was a contestant in the third Australian series of Dancing with the Stars alongside professional dance partner Trenton Shipley. In seven out of the ten weeks of the series, she obtained the highest score from the judges, including the semi-final and grand final. However, when the votes were combined with those of the viewers, Chris Bath finished second to Home and Away actor Ada Nicodemou for the title of Dancing with the Stars Champion.

From 12 December 2005, Bath presented Seven News Sydney until the end of 2005. She then returned Seven Morning News on Wednesday to Friday and did the Seven News Sydney weekend news until mid-January 2006.

In 2006, Bath began presenting Seven Morning News on Monday to Thursday and the Sydney evening news on Fridays. From May, Bath swapped roles with Ann Sanders to present the weekend evening news in Sydney as well as Fridays. Sanders took over the Morning News. Later that year, Bath also presented a new employment-based reality series for the Seven Network titled You've Got The Job.

During 2007 and 2008, Bath often presented the Seven Late News updates and Seven 4.30 News on Fridays. This continued into 2009, with Bath replacing Monique Wright as the Friday presenter of Seven 4.30 News.

In January 2009, Bath was appointed host of Seven's new current affairs program, Sunday Night. In November of that year, Bath became the weeknight anchor of Seven News Sydney, following the retirement of Ian Ross. In July 2012, she was partnered by her husband Jim Wilson as sports presenter for the 6pm weeknight bulletin.

In January 2014, Bath was replaced by Mark Ferguson. Bath continued to present the 6pm news on Friday and Saturday, as well as Sunday Night.

In June 2015, it was announced that Bath would leave the Seven Network after twenty years with the network, to explore new horizons, with Melissa Doyle to replace her on Sunday Night and Seven News Sydney on weekends.

=== Network 10 ===
In late 2015 and 2016, Bath made regular appearances on Network Ten shows Studio 10 and The Project. In 2017, Bath was the regular co-host of The Sunday Project alongside Hamish Macdonald. She was replaced by Lisa Wilkinson in January 2018.

In December 2018, it was announced that Bath would join Network 10 to present 10 News Weekend, replacing Natarsha Belling.

In October 2025, Network 10 announced it would not renew Bath’s contract as part of a broader cost-cutting initiative. She will remain with the network until December.

Bath hosted an extended edition of 10 News Weekends on 14 December 2025, providing live coverage of the Bondi Beach shooting. This bulletin was Bath’s last at the Network.

=== ABC ===
Bath worked for ABC Radio from November 2016 until the end of 2019. She hosted Evenings on ABC Radio Sydney across New South Wales and the ACT from 2017, replacing Christine Anu.

In November 2017, Bath narrated the six-part documentary series Keeping Australia Safe. for ABC TV. She has also been a fill in presenter on ABC News NSW.

She resigned from ABC Radio at the end of 2019.

In November 2024, ABC announced that Bath will return to ABC Radio Sydney to replace Richard Glover to host Drive from January 2025.

In November 2025, Bath announced that she would step down as host of the Drive program at the end of the year. She said that she wanted to pursue passion projects and move to a slower-paced format. From 2026, Bath will host a new Sunday morning show, while journalist Thomas Oriti will succeed her as Drive host.

=== Community ===
Outside the Seven Network, Bath's standing in the industry was acknowledged in 2004 when she was asked to judge entries for the TV current affairs reporting and camera category of the Walkley Awards for journalism.

Bath is a master of ceremonies, having performed the role at a number of events including the Jeans for Genes Day Art Auction in Sydney on 20 July 2006 and 12 July 2007. Bath enjoys motivational speaking, and in 2003 she took a large role in the "Step to the future" youth leadership forum for school students in Sydney. On 24 July 2007, Chris spoke at the "Empowerment through Inspiration" Summit in Queensland where she will address her experiences and challenges in becoming a leader, building a team and networking. She is also Celebrity Ambassador for the Petrea King Quest for Life Foundation.

== Other works ==
Other than Seven News, Bath has appeared on a number of television programs and a film including:

- The Man Who Sued God (2001) as Newsreader
- All Saints
  - Episode 4.01 "The Heat is On" (13 February 2001) as Newsreader
  - Episode 4.32 "Wild Justice" (4 September 2001) as Newsreader
  - Episode 5.01 "Opening Night" (5 February 2002) as Newsreader
  - Episode 5.02 "The Show Must Go On" (12 February 2002) as News Reporter
  - Episode 8.27 "Frozen Moments" (16 August 2005) as Newsreader
  - Episode 9.32 "Happy Returns" (26 September 2006) as Newsreader
  - Episode 10.12 "Choices of the Heart" (8 May 2007) as Newsreader
  - Episode 11.02 "The Simple Things" (19 February 2008) as Newsreader
- Season 3 of Dancing with the Stars (September–November 2005) as herself. She was runner-up in the program which was won by Ada Nicodemou.
- headLand episode 1.27 (4 January 2006) as Newsreader
- True Stories Episode 2.02 "Sophie's Story" (16 July 2006) as Host
- You've Got the Job 13 episodes (November 2006) as Host
