= Mind Twist =

Australian children's television series

- Genre: Game Show
- Presented by: Maynard
- Country of origin: Australia
- Original language: English
- No. of seasons: 2

Production
- Running time: 26 minutes

Original release
- Network: Network Ten
- Release: 1992 – 1993

Mind Twist is an Australian children's game show series aired on Network Ten from 1992 to 1993. It was hosted by Maynard.
