= The Thursday Night Sport Show =

- Genre: Sports Show
- Presented by: Mel McLaughlin
- Starring: Mark Howard; Sam Mac
- Country of origin: Australia
- Original language: English
- No. of seasons: 1
- No. of episodes: 7

Production
- Production locations: South Yarra, Victoria
- Running time: 60 minutes

Original release
- Network: One
- Release: 2 October – 13 November 2014

The Thursday Night Sport Show was an Australian sports television series that aired on One every Thursday at 9:30 p.m. from 2 October 2014 and 13 November 2014. The show was hosted by Mel McLaughlin with regular panelists Mark Howard and Sam Mac.
