= Rebecca Wilson =

Australian journalist

- Born: 23 December 1961; Brisbane, Queensland, Australia
- Died: 7 October 2016 (aged 54); Sydney, New South Wales, Australia
- Occupations: Journalist; radio broadcaster; television presenter
- Years active: 1980–2016
- Spouse(s): Howard Sacre (1990–2003, divorced); John Hartigan (2012–her death)
- Children: Two sons
- Relatives: Bruce Wilson (father); Jim Wilson (brother)

Rebecca Louise Wilson (22 December 1961 – 7 October 2016) was an Australian sports journalist, radio and television broadcaster and personality, known for the comic television talk sports show The Fat, in which she appeared regularly with host Tony Squires. She was a panellist on numerous television programs including Beauty and the Beast, Sunrise and The Footy Show. She worked in both the newspaper and television industries for over 20 years and won a Kennedy Award in 2013.

== Biography ==
=== Early life ===
Wilson was born in Brisbane in 1961. She recollected that she could not remember a time when newspapers were not in her life – her grandfather was a newsagent and her father a journalist. She attended the University of Queensland and began to study a Bachelor of Arts in journalism, however she was offered a four-year cadetship with the Brisbane Courier-Mail and abandoned her studies in order to take the position.

After four years of general reporting at the Courier-Mail, Wilson moved into television. She worked for Channel 10 Brisbane, where she reported on the Brisbane Commonwealth Games, the Seoul Olympics and rugby league. She also worked for ABC Television as a host and reporter on the show Saturday Afternoon Sports, and was later Media Manager for Super League for four years, a role which she later described as "the most interesting time in my career". Following this, she moved to News Limited as General Manager of their Sydney Olympics Division and then Project Manager for the agency's Rugby World Cup coverage.

Wilson continued her newspaper work with a sports column in the Sunday Telegraph and also co-wrote a sports blog called Bec and Buzz with Phillip Rothfield in the Daily Telegraph. Wilson's opinion pieces regarding the A-League have been controversial and faced significant criticism. She leaked the names and faces of 198 individuals who were banned from entering football stadiums by the Football Federation Australia. As a result, Wilson received death threats from the public and the Football Federation issued a statement urging football fans to refrain from threatening her. For many years she was an ambassador for the Sydney Swans, but she claimed this did not influence her writings

She was a co-host on the Vega 95.3 breakfast show with Tony Squires and Mikey Robins. In early 2009, Wilson announced that she was leaving Vega and in October it was announced that Vega would no longer continue with the breakfast show.

Wilson was a regular panellist on SportsNight with James Bracey on Sky News Australia.

=== Awards ===
In 2013, Wilson was a joint finalist in the Walkley Awards for Excellence in Journalism in the Print/Text News Report category. The same year, she was a joint finalist in the Kennedy Awards For Excellence in New South Wales Journalism in the Outstanding Investigative Reporting category and the Splash of the Year category. Her team won the Splash of the Year category. She was awarded 2016 Australian Sports Commission Media Award for Lifetime Achievement, and later that year, a Walkley Award for Journalistic Leadership.

On 12 December 2021, Rebecca Wilson was posthumously inducted to the Sydney Cricket Ground Media Hall of Honour, alongside 11 others added to the inaugural 15 media personalities who were first celebrated in 2014.

=== Television career ===
Year(s)	Program	Network	Role
2013–2016	SportsNight with James Bracey	Sky News Live	Panellist
2010	Sunrise	Seven Network	Daily commentary on sports stories
2010	2010 Commonwealth Games	Foxtel	Roving reporter
2008	2008 Summer Olympics	Seven Network	Ceremonies
2005	The Footy Show (rugby league)	Nine Network	Panellist
2004	2004 Summer Olympics	Seven Network	Opening ceremony
2004	110% Tony Squires	Seven Network	Co-host
2000–2003	The Fat	ABC Television	Panellist
1992–1995	Saturday Afternoon Sports	ABC Television	Compere
1984–1988	Ten News (Brisbane)	Network Ten	Senior sports reporter

== Personal life ==
Wilson was the daughter of former News Limited foreign correspondent Bruce Wilson, and the sister of sports reporter Jim Wilson. She was married to television producer Howard Sacre from 1990 to 2003, with whom she had two children. Her second marriage, in 2012, was to former News Limited chief executive, John Hartigan.

Wilson was a repeat offender on driving charges including drink driving and driving without a licence.

=== Death ===
Wilson died at her family home in Sydney on 7 October 2016 from breast cancer. Her death was announced that morning by her friend and radio broadcaster Alan Jones who subsequently wrote an obituary in The Australian.

Her death came as a shock to many people around her because she had kept her diagnosis a secret. Her funeral was held at St Andrew's Cathedral, Sydney on 14 October 2016.

Wilson is survived by her husband John and two sons.
