= Fox Sports FC =

- Genre: soccer discussion
- Presented by: Andy Harper, Mark Bosnich, Melanie McLaughlin, Marko Rudan
- Country of origin: Australia
- Original language: English

Production
- Production locations: Sydney, Australia
- Running time: 90 minutes

Original release
- Network: Fox Sports
- Release: 2000 – 2021

Fox Sports FC (formerly Total Football) was an Australian soccer discussion show that televised on Fox Sports.

== History ==
Aired at 8:30pm every Tuesday night on Fox Sports, the show was split into two halves, with the first half of the show dedicated to the A-League and the second to European soccer.

Regular panelists included Andy Harper, Mark Bosnich, Melanie McLaughlin, Marko Rudan and others to discuss and dissect the weekend's action. The European-based segment primarily discusses the Premier League, with wrap-ups and highlights of football around the world. The European section usually included a guest from England via video link such as Darren Lewis, Ray Parlour, Gary O'Reilly and Stewart Robson.

== See also ==
- The World Game
