= Katrina Lee =

Australian executive and news presenter

- Occupations: executive director; senior lecturer; television presenter; journalist
- Years active: 1978
- Employer: Roman Catholic Archdiocese of Sydney
- Known for: being a Logie Award winning television presenter
- Television: Ten Eyewitness News, Good Afternoon Australia, Page One, Public Eye, Holiday, Review
- Spouse: Harry Potter (m. 1976; died 2014)

Katrina Lee is an Australian executive director and former television news presenter.

Lee is perhaps best known for her association with Network Ten where she was a Logie Award-winning news presenter at TEN-10 in Sydney from the 1970s to the 1990s.

== Career ==
=== Television career ===
After beginning her career as a newspaper journalist at The Daily Telegraph in the 1970s, Lee joined TEN-10.

Lee was appointed as co-presenter of Ten Eyewitness News in 1978. Her appointment came just months after the Australian Broadcasting Commission attracted widespread attention by appointing Margaret Throsby as an ABC News presenter on ABC TV. Although Melody Iliffe is considered to be Australia's first female news presenter when she read the news on Brisbane's QTQ-9 in the 1960s, Throsby and Lee are now regarded as being part of a pioneering group of women who became the first women to read television news bulletins in Australia. Throughout her time reading the news at Ten, Lee was paired with John Bailey, Tim Webster, Ron Wilson and John Mangos.

In late 1984, Lee commenced co-hosted a national daytime program called Good Afternoon Australia with Gordon Elliott. The program was launched by Ten over the summer period in an attempt to lure viewers across from the Nine Network following the end of their popular daytime show The Mike Walsh Show. In February 1985, Ten's show was retitled After Noon as it attempted to rival Nine's new Midday program, hosted by Ray Martin. Ten's After Noon was axed soon after, unable to compete with Midday.

In 1985 Lee was part of one of the first television crews to travel to Ethiopia to cover the famine and in 1986 she co-hosted Ten's coverage of the wedding of Prince Andrew and Sarah Ferguson with Gordon Elliott and James Whitaker.

In 1988, Lee was a part of a new current affairs show on Ten called Page One, which covered events from Australia and around the world. Lee's fellow reporters included Chris Masters, Maxine McKew, Kerry O'Brien, Jill Singer and Brad Robinson. After Page One was axed in 1989, Lee was retained as part of the reporting team for Public Eye - Ten's new current affairs program which incorporated most of the reporting and production staff from Page One.

In 1991, Lee joined the ABC, where she became a reporter for the national travel show Holiday. Her fellow Holiday reporters included Eric Campbell and Bob La Castra. Lee also hosted the ABC's national Sunday afternoon Review arts and culture program.

In late 1991 Lee was back at Ten, reading the news alongside John Mangos. She also presenting a special for Ten called Russia in Crisis.

=== Later career ===
After leaving television, Lee became a senior lecturer in journalism.

Lee appeared on a 2007 episode of the Seven Network's Where Are They Now? program alongside fellow notable news presenters James Dibble, Roger Climpson, David Johnston, Margaret Throsby and Jennifer Keyte where they discussed their respective careers.

Lee then became the director of communications and then executive advisor at the Roman Catholic Archdiocese of Sydney.

In this role, she was vocal in her support of George Pell who had been accused of sexual abuse, and defensive of the way the Catholic Church was dealing with sexual abuse allegations. Her support of Pell attracted criticism from families of alleged child sexual abuse victims.

Lee supported Pell as he stood trial in August 2018 after he pleaded not guilty to five historical child sexual abuse charges. In December 2018, Pell was found guilty by a jury of all charges but his convictions were subsequently overturned and quashed by the High Court of Australia in April 2020 and he was released from prison.

== Awards ==
Lee received Logie Awards for Most Popular Female (New South Wales) in 1980, 1981, 1982 and 1983.

== Personal life ==
Lee married Harry Potter in 1976 when they were both journalists at The Daily Telegraph. They then worked together at Ten, with Potter becoming the station's crime reporter. Potter retired in 2010, five years after he was diagnosed with bowel cancer. He died in 2014 and Lee delivered the first reading at his funeral mass held at St Mary's Cathedral.
