= Kennedy Awards (journalism) =

Australian journalism awards

The Kennedy Awards, also formerly known as the NRMA Kennedy Awards, are Australian awards for journalism based in Sydney, New South Wales, run by the Kennedy Foundation, and named in honour of Indigenous Australian journalist Les Kennedy, who died in 2011. As of 2022 there are 34 categories in the annual event, with the main prize being The Kennedy Prize – Journalist of the Year, while a Lifetime Achievement Award is awarded each year as well.

== History ==
Commencing in 2012, named in honour of Indigenous journalist Les Kennedy (1958–2011) in the year after his death, the intention was to stage an event in NSW equivalent to journalism awards in other states and territories. However the Kennedy Awards quickly grew to being a national event. The Kennedy Foundation was created as a charitable organisation on 7 March 2014 in order to attract funds for the awards and other endeavours, including providing scholarships for young Aboriginal and Torres Strait Islander journalists.

The awards have been run annually without interruption since 2012. In 2021 they were also referred to as the NRMA Kennedy Awards, being sponsored by the NRMA. There were 34 categories in 2022.

In 2021–2022 the Kennedy Foundation entered a sponsorship deal with an organisation calling itself the Australian Journalists Association, which was exposed as a front for an organisation of dubious integrity, the Journalists First Inc., a small group of conservative political operatives based in Queensland which spread anti-vaccination and other controversial information. The foundation ceased its association with this organisation in May 2022.

== Kennedy Foundation ==
The foundation is a strong advocate for cultural and gender diversity in media. As of August 2022 ; .

== Awards ==
The awards take place in Sydney. The main prize is Journalist of the Year (won by women in seven out of the nine events after 2012). Many of its awards are named after outstanding journalists, in several categories: Sport (Peter Frilingos); Indigenous Affairs (John Newfong); Outstanding Columnist (Peter Ruehl); Les Kennedy (Outstanding Crime Reporting) ,Outstanding Foreign Correspondent (Tom Krause) Outstanding Team Player or Mentor(Cliff Neville), Outstanding Racing Coverage (Rod Allen) Outstanding Cartoon (Vince O'Farrell), Scoop of the Year (Rebecca Wilson), Regional Broadcast Reporting (Paul Lockyer), Outstanding Feature Writing (Jim Oram), Regional Reporting -Print and Digital (Chris Watson), Outstanding News Camera Coverage(Gary Ticehurst), Television News Reporting (Harry Potter), Nightly Television Current Affairs (Mike Willessee), Television Current Affairs Reporting -Long Form (David Leckie AM)and Outstanding Radio News and Current Affairs (Sean Flannery) .

=== Past winners ===
The Kennedy Prize – Journalist of the Year

- 2012: Kate McClymont, The Sydney Morning Herald
- 2013: Joanne McCarthy, Newcastle Herald
- 2014: Adele Ferguson, Fairfax Media, ABC TV
- 2015: Caro Meldrum-Hanna, Four Corners, ABC TV
- 2016: Adele Ferguson
- 2017: Chris O'Keefe, Nine News
- 2018: Sharri Markson, The Daily Telegraph
- 2019: Anne Connolly, Four Corners, 7:30, ABC TV
- 2020: Nick McKenzie, of 60 Minutes, The Age, The Sydney Morning Herald
- 2021: Samantha Maiden, of news.com.au
- 2022: Nick McKenzie
- 2023: Neil Chenoweth and Edmund Tadros, of The Australian Financial Review
- 2024: John Lyons
- 2025: Nick McKenzie - Building Bad -The Age, Sydney Morning Herald, AFR and 60 Minutes
- 2026: Edmund Tadros and Hannah Wootton-KPMG audit leaks scandal - The Australian Financial Review

Lifetime Achievement Award

- 2013: Harry Potter, Ten News
- 2014: Philip Cornford
- 2015: Ian Heads OAM
- 2016: John Smith, The Daily Telegraph
- 2017: Ita Buttrose
- 2018: Jana Wendt
- 2019: Brian Henderson
- 2020: John Hartigan
- 2021: John Laws
- 2022: Bruce McAvaney OAM, of Seven Network
- 2023: Laurie Oakes
- 2024: Tracey Grimshaw
- 2025 Peter Ryan OAM
- 2025 Michelle Grattan
- 2026 Bret Christian OAM
