= Ben Damon =

Australian journalist (born 1980)

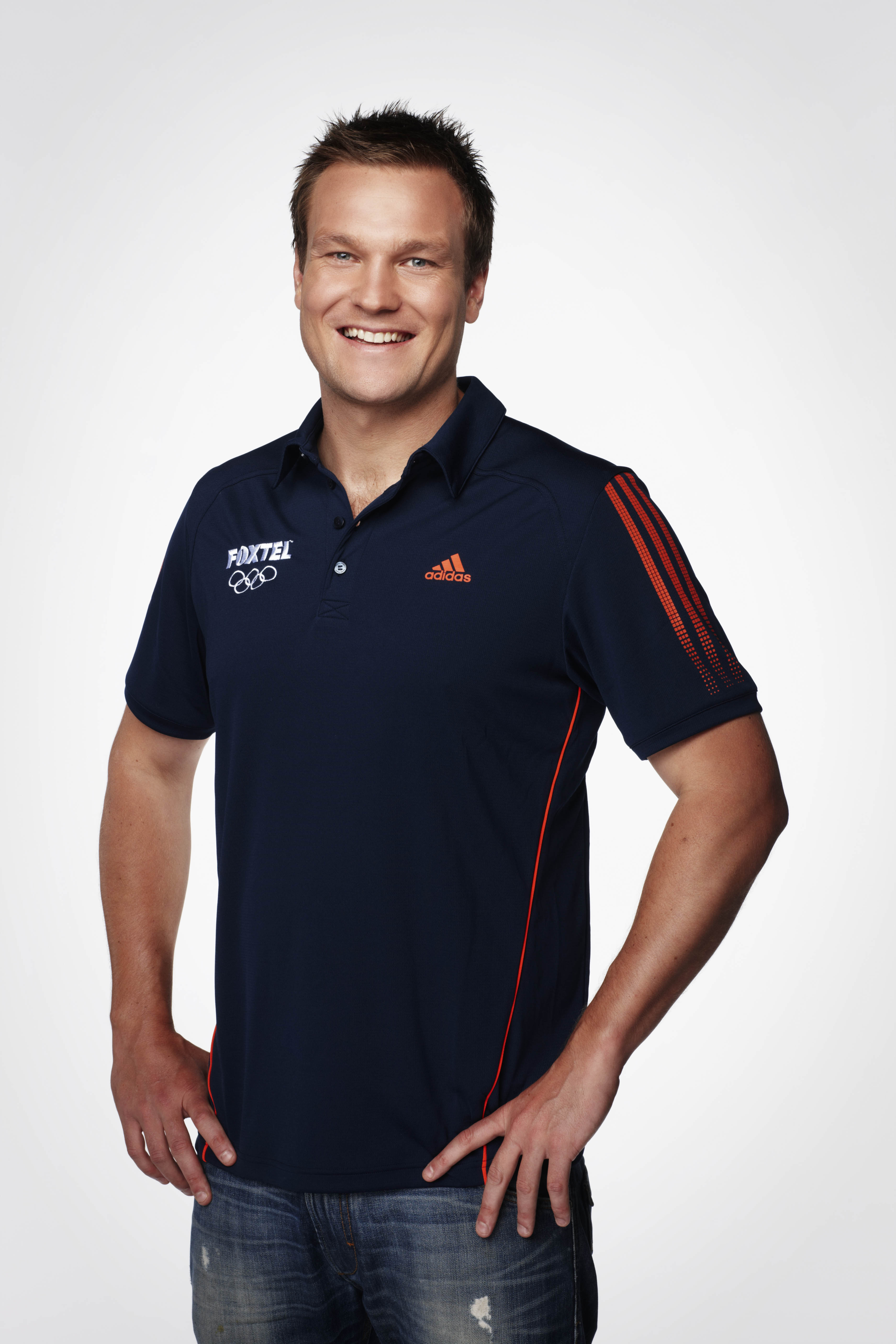
Ben Damon

Ben Damon (born 24 October 1980) is an Australian journalist, TV presenter and screenwriter/director.

Damon is a TV host who has presented on Foxtel's Olympic coverage, Sunrise, Weekend Today, Sky News Australia, Sky Racing and Fox Sports.

== Career ==
Damon is the face and voice of Main Event's pay-per-view television boxing coverage.

Prior to his resignation, Damon was a sport presenter on Seven News in Sydney.

Damon also presented the Nine Network's horse racing coverage and was previously on Sports Tonight on Network Ten.

Damon is a filmmaker. His debut feature film won Best Documentary at the London International Film Festival amongst other awards.

Damon is a popular master of ceremonies with the Australian Turf Club and other organisations.

Damon was a finalist in the 2009 Cleo Bachelor of the Year competition.
