= Radio 2 (Australian radio station) =

- Australia
- Frequencies: AM: 1611–1629 kHz; Austar: 2; Foxtel: 831

Programming
- Language: English
- Format: Classic hits, talk radio

Ownership
- Owner: WorldAudio Limited

History
- First air date: October 2001
- Last air date: 21 July 2006

Technical information
- Licensing authority: ACMA

Links
- Website: www.radio2.com.au

Radio 2 was a narrowband Australian radio network owned and operated by WorldAudio Limited. The network was broadcast on frequencies between 1611 and 1629 kHz via a series of 50 AM transmitters across Australia, as well as by satellite (including through Austar and Foxtel) and through the network's website.

== History ==
Radio 2 began in Blacktown in Western Sydney on 1611 AM in October 2001, broadcasting under a Section 40 licence - meaning it could only operate on narrowband AM frequencies (1611–1701 kHz), and with narrow spectrum - 5 kHz, rather than the full 9 kHz which other commercial radio stations use. Branded "The New Voice Of Western Sydney", the station focused on live and local content, similar to 2WS in its heyday.

In 2002, Radio 2 was a broadcast partner of the 2002 FIFA World Cup, broadcasting live coverage of matches, with the call led by Colin Turner. In 2003, Radio 2 was a broadcast partner of the AFL, hosting live coverage of Sydney Swans home games from the Sydney Cricket Ground and Stadium Australia.

=== National expansion ===
In November 2003, owners WorldAudio Limited acquired a series of 14 additional transmitters, forming a national commercial AM radio network. This did not come without drama - a legal battle had begun between owners WorldAudio and GB Radio in Melbourne, over the use of the 1620 AM licence - WorldAudio would eventually use 1629 AM in Melbourne instead. In April 2005, owners WorldAudio signed Mikey Robins and Ian Rogerson to host The Big Australian Breakfast which Kelley Shepherd produced, Nick Bennett to host the Nick's Nation drive show, and former Seven News presenter Ross Symonds to host Sunday morning business program The Bottom Line.

In May 2005, the station launched nationally to a network of 50 stations around the country, dropping the Western Sydney focus and moving to programming of national significance. At launch, WorldAudio CEO Andrew Peter Thompson boasted the station "[could] be picked up by 93% of all radio receivers." Additional programming included Sportswatch Australia with Colin Turner, She Said with Sophie Falkiner and Katrina Warren, produced by Kelley Shepherd, and Politically Direct with Paul Makin. The network had an emphasis on sporting coverage, with coverage of A-League and English Premier League soccer, AFL (including Sydney Swans and Brisbane Lions games, plus the 2005 AFL Grand Final), and the NBL.

=== Downfall and closure ===
However, the network's success wasn't to be. A combination of minimal listenership and low advertising lead to a trading halt being placed on parent company WorldAudio, with the announcement that administrators had been appointed to the company a week later. Administrators halted all talk based content, leaving the station to broadcast non-stop music.

Radio 2 temporarily ceased broadcasting as of Friday, 21 July 2006. Broadcasting on the WorldAudio Groups licences will resume at Christmas 2006. Administrators Hall Chadwick are selling off World Audio's Radio 2's studio equipment at auction.

— Radio 2 website, 21 July 2006

Radio 2's frequencies were later sold, either to Rete Italia, the start-up Vision Christian Radio, or to the similarly ill-fated Goanna country music network.

== Availability (at time of closure) ==
| Licence area | Frequency | Frequency currently occupied by |
|---|---|---|
| Nationwide | Austar channel 2 Foxtel channel 831 | Defunct; Max 70s Hits |
| Canberra, Australian Capital Territory | 1620 AM | Defunct |
| Cowra, New South Wales | 1611 AM | Defunct |
| Dubbo, New South Wales | 1611 AM | Defunct |
| Eden, New South Wales | 1620 AM | Defunct |
| Griffith, New South Wales | 1611 AM | Defunct |
| Grafton, New South Wales | 1629 AM | Defunct |
| Lismore, New South Wales | 1611 AM | Defunct |
| Newcastle, New South Wales | 1620 AM | Defunct |
| Port Macquarie, New South Wales | 1611 AM | Defunct |
| Sydney, New South Wales | 1611 AM | Vision Christian Radio |
| Tamworth, New South Wales | 1629 AM | Defunct |
| Wagga Wagga, New South Wales | 1620 AM | Defunct |
| West Wyalong, New South Wales | 1629 AM | Defunct |
| Yamba, New South Wales | 1620 AM | Defunct |
| Yass, New South Wales | 1629 AM | Defunct |
| Alice Springs, Northern Territory | 1611 AM | Defunct |
| Darwin, Northern Territory | 1611 AM | Niche Radio Network |
| Bowen, Queensland | 1611 AM | Defunct |
| Brisbane, Queensland | 1620 AM | Defunct |
| Cairns, Queensland | 1620 AM | Defunct |
| Dalby, Queensland | 1611 AM | Defunct |
| Gladstone, Queensland | 1620 AM | Niche Radio Network |
| Gold Coast, Queensland | 1620 AM | Niche Radio Network |
| Hervey Bay, Queensland | 1611 AM | Defunct |
| Mackay, Queensland | 1611 AM | Niche Radio Network |
| Redcliffe, Queensland | 1629 AM | Defunct |
| Sunshine Coast, Queensland | 1620 AM | Niche Radio Network |
| Toowoomba, Queensland | 1620 AM | Defunct |
| Townsville, Queensland | 1611 AM | Defunct |
| Adelaide, South Australia | 1629 AM | SEN SA |
| Mount Gambier, South Australia | 1629 AM | SEN SA |
| Port Augusta, South Australia | 1629 AM | Defunct |
| Victor Harbor, South Australia | 1629 AM | Defunct |
| Whyalla, South Australia | 1611 AM | Defunct |
| Devonport, Tasmania | 1611 AM | Niche Radio Network |
| Hobart, Tasmania (South) | 1611 AM | Niche Radio Network |
| Launceston, Tasmania | 1611 AM | Niche Radio Network |
| Echuca, Victoria; Moama, New South Wales | 1620 AM | Defunct |
| Melbourne, Victoria (North) | 1620 AM; 1629 AM | Defunct; ACR Chinese Radio |
| Portland, Victoria | 1611 AM | Defunct |
| Albany, Western Australia | 1629 AM | Defunct |
| Broome, Western Australia | 1611 AM | Defunct |
| Bunbury, Western Australia | 1629 AM | Defunct |
| Esperance, Western Australia | 1611 AM | Niche Radio Network |
| Geraldton, Western Australia | 1620 AM | Defunct |
| Kalgoorlie, Western Australia | 1611 AM | Niche Radio Network |
| Perth, Western Australia | 1620 AM; 1629 AM | Defunct; Defunct |
