= You've Got the Job =

- Starring: Chris Bath
- Country of origin: Australia
- No. of episodes: 13

Production
- Running time: 30 minutes per episode (inc. commercials)

Original release
- Network: Seven Network
- Release: November 2006

You've Got the Job is a television show that aired on the Seven Network in Australia. The show was hosted by Seven News presenter and former Dancing with the Stars contestant Chris Bath.

The program follows real people seeking actual jobs, and the stories of the employers and potential employees. You've Got the Job aired on Sunday nights at 7pm.
