= The Castanet Club =

Australian cabaret group

- Origin: Newcastle, New South Wales, Australia
- Genres: Cabaret; vaudeville; musical theatre; improv; character comedy
- Years active: 1982–1991
- Label: Giddy Records
- Past members: Stephen Abbott; Glenn Butcher; Angela Moore; Russell Cheek; Warren Coleman; Rodney Cambridge; Penny Biggins; Kathy Bluff; Maynard; Peter Mahony; Mikey Robbins; Jacqueline Amidy

The Castanet Club was an Australian cabaret collective from Newcastle Australia which spawned several well known media personalities.

== History ==
The Castanet Club (colloquially known as The Castanets) began playing at the Clarendon Hotel in Newcastle in 1982. They soon gathered a following and played venues all around Newcastle before adopting the premises of an ex disco adjoining the Clarendon Hotel. The venue was decorated by the group along with local artist Michael Bell in Bell's "acid-trip circus aesthetic" and itself became known as the Castanet Club, having the name across the front of the building. The Castanets played here and invited guest artists to perform, some of whom joined the group. At one stage, in 1983, Tiny Tim played the venue sharing the stage with the band. Supplementing the performances here, audiences joined the band for mobile performance known as Swinging Safari World Tours run on rented buses involving musical acts and live events around Newcastle.

As the Castanet Club grew more successful, they toured nationally, including a sell-out season at the 1984 Adelaide Festival where they won the "Best of the Fringe" award against approximately 300 other performers from around the country. About 1985 the band permanently relocated to Sydney where they enjoyed runs at the Sydney Trade Union Club's cabaret space "The Gap" and popular comedy venue, the Harold Park Hotel, they adopted a theatrical mode, performing seasons at Belvoir Street Theatre as well as reviving the bus-based mobile Safari shows. This period is recorded in the 1990 Neil Armfield movie, The Castanet Club, featuring live concert footage.

The Castanet Club subsequently performed in London and at the Edinburgh Festival Fringe, where their shows received positive reviews.

The Castanet Club played their final show in 1991.

In 2021 the Newcastle Museum hosted a retrospective exhibition The Castanet Club: An Exhibition You Can Dance To! featuring footage, photographs, props, costumes and other Castanets' paraphernalia, including the iconic sign from over their Newcastle venue. Film-makers Glenn Dormand (aka Chit Chat von Loopin Stab) and Tony Whittaker created an instalment of the Stories of Our Town film series entitled Stories of Our Town: The Castanet Club Story to coincide with the exhibition.

== Members ==
The members of the Castanet Club adopted persona for their performances and often specialised in a musical instrument.

- Stephen Abbott as Johnny Goodman on guitar
- Penny Biggins as Doris Crawley on accordion
- Kathy Bluff as the Kid Kalamai / Kid Paganini on violin
- Glenn Butcher as lounge lizard Lance Norton
- Rodney Cambridge on drums
- Russell Cheek as Tron Wexler & Barnsey's roadie Doug 'Gargoyle' Ormerod
- Warren Coleman as Bowling Man & Pastor Noel Anderson
- Peter Mahony as Urman Erstwhile on bass
- Maynard as Maynard F# Crabbes on Trombone
- Angela Moore as Betty B-Plate & Shirley Purvis
- Mikey Robins as Elvis Presle
- John Hay on keyboards
- Jacqueline Amidy as Nastassja Bassi diva vocalist

Several Castanets went on to entertainment careers in the Australian media: Maynard and Mikey Robbins became breakfast presenters at Radio station triple j, Steve Abbott evolved his Johnny Goodman character into the Sandman who was on Australian radio and television through the nineties, Glen Butcher joined popular ensemble sketch comedy show Full Frontal, and Angela Moore became a Play School presenter.

Two Castanets, Warren Coleman and Russell Cheek, each separately won the television quiz show Sale of the Century. Warren Coleman would go on to co-write the Academy Award winning animated feature Happy Feet.

== Discography ==
List of albums, with selected chart positions
Title	Album details	Peak chart positions
Title	Album details	AUS
The Castanet Club	Released: October 1986; Format: LP, Cassette; Label: Giddy Records (CASTO 12)	-

== Publications ==
- "The Castanet Club: History, provenance and influence". Australasian Drama Studies, No. 66, Apr 2015: [225]-252. ISSN: 0810–4123.
- The Castanet Club: a Newcastle Story, Castanet Club Press, ISBN 9780646836904, 0646836900
