= John Hartigan (media executive) =

Australian media executive

John Hartigan AO is a former Australian journalist and media executive, who worked for News Limited for 41 years, ending his career there as CEO and chair in 2011.

== Career ==
Hartigan started his career in newspapers at the age of 16 and worked for John Fairfax and Sons from 1964 to 1970.

After joining News Limited in 1970 as a reporter on the Daily Mirror in 1970, he later worked for the Daily Telegraph, both in Sydney. He then moved to London worked for The Sun, and on to New York City to report for the New York Post.

Upon his return to Australia, Hartigan moved to Brisbane to take up editorship of the Queensland edition of the Sunday Herald Sun, and became inaugural editor of The Daily Sun (Note: Later, Sun) there. He was also director of News Limited subsidiary Queensland Sun Newspapers.

In 1986 Hartigan took up editorship of The Daily Telegraph, being promoted to Editor-in-Chief of both The Daily Telegraph and The Sunday Telegraph in 1989. In 1997 he was appointed to the most senior editorial position in News Limited, Group Editorial Director, and was responsible for all of the company's newspapers in that role.

In 2000 he was appointed Chief Executive Officer, adding chairman to his role in 2005. During his time in the roles, he presided over a number of controversies, included Eatock v Bolt, the court case following News Limited journalist Andrew Bolt breaching the Racial Discrimination Act, and an unfair dismissal case brought by former Herald Sun editor Bruce Guthrie.

On 30 November 2011, Hartigan left News Limited, and owner Rupert Murdoch took on the role of chairman, while former Foxtel executive Kim Williams took on the role of CEO. Staff were shocked at the decision and there was speculation as to whether he left of his own accord or not.

== Other activities ==
- 2006: Australian National University's Reconciliation Lecture, addressing ways to reduce Indigenous Australians' disadvantage
- 2007: Andrew Olle Media Lecture at the Australian Broadcasting Corporation
- 2007: Leader of "Australia's Right to Know", a media coalition which advocated for legislative changes "to improve the openness and transparency of government and the courts"

As of 2011 he was director of The Bradman Foundation, the American Australian Association, the NSW Wine Industry Council, and the NSW Export and Investment Advisory Board.

== Awards and recognition ==
- 2008: Walkley Award for Journalistic Leadership
- 2020: Kennedy Awards, Lifetime Achievement Award
- 2022: Officer of the Order of Australia, in the Australia Day Honours

== Personal life ==
Hartigan was married to journalist Rebecca Wilson, who died of breast cancer in October 2016. They had honeymooned on the Greek island of Santorini just weeks before her diagnosis in 2012, and had been partners for at least two years before that.
