= Tony Squires =

Australian media personality of radio and television and author

- Born: 22 June 1961 (age 65); Sydney, New South Wales, Australia
- Occupations: Journalist; television host; sports reader; radio presenter
- Years active: 1982–present
- Known for: The Fat; Seven News; Triple M The Back Page

Tony Squires (born 22 June 1961) is an Australian media personality of radio and television and published author.

He is perhaps best known as the presenter of the comic sport news show The Fat, which ran on ABC television from 2000 to 2003.

== Career ==
=== Television ===
In 2000, Squires began hosting the sports show The Fat, which aired on ABC television. He remained on the show during its entire run, that ended in late 2003, when it was axed. In 2004, he joined the Seven Network to host a revamped, and retitled, sport show 110% Tony Squires, which only lasted one season.

In 2008, he joined Network Ten to host Big Mouth, a panel show based around reality television show Big Brother. The show also lasted one season, as Big Brother was axed after the 2008 series.

In April 2010, Squires replaced Alex Cullen as weekday sports presenter on Seven News in Sydney. In August 2012, Squires was replaced by Jim Wilson.

Squires has also a been fill in presenter on Weekend Sunrise and The Morning Show.

In August 2012, he became a reporter on Sunday Night on Seven meaning that he no longer presents the sport on Seven News Sydney, making him the second sports presenter from the Sydney bulletin to become a Sunday Night reporter, after Alex Cullen.

In 2013, he started hosting The Back Page on Fox Sports, as he continued to do alongside journalist Kelli Underwood, until the show's conclusion in 2025. Squires hosted for the final 13 seasons of the program's 29-year run on Fox Sports.

=== Radio ===
Squires' early work in radio involved writing news bulletins for the Sydney radio station 2SM, and SBS Radio station 2EA.

In 2005, Squires and long-time colleague Rebecca Wilson (The Fat, Big Mouth) were hired by new radio station Vega 95.3 Sydney to co-host the drive-time program. In 2007, Squires and Wilson were joined by Mikey Robins, but Wilson's retirement in September 2009 prompted Vega to stand down Squires and Robins a month later.

In 2010, Tony joined Triple M hosting 'The Grapple' Sunday mornings from 8 am alongside Andrew Johns and Mark Geyer. In 2011, Squires was appointed presenter of a new rugby program on Triple M called 'The Ruck' on Sunday mornings from 9 am alongside Tim Horan and Matt Burke. He is also a fill in presenter on The Grill Team.

=== Books ===
Squires released his book Cracking The Footy Codes: A beginner's guide to AFL, league, union and football in 2009.

== Personal life ==
Squires grew up in Caves Beach, a suburb of Newcastle, New South Wales, where he worked as a journalist for the Newcastle Morning Herald in the early 1980s. In the 1990s he wrote a regular television review column in The Sydney Morning Herald.

Squires married his girlfriend of two years, public relations executive Kate Pascoe, on 28 November 2008. He had separated from his previous wife of twenty years, with whom he had two daughters, in 2006.

Squires is a fan of the St. George Illawarra Dragons and the Sydney Swans.
