= Maynard (broadcaster) =

Australian entertainer

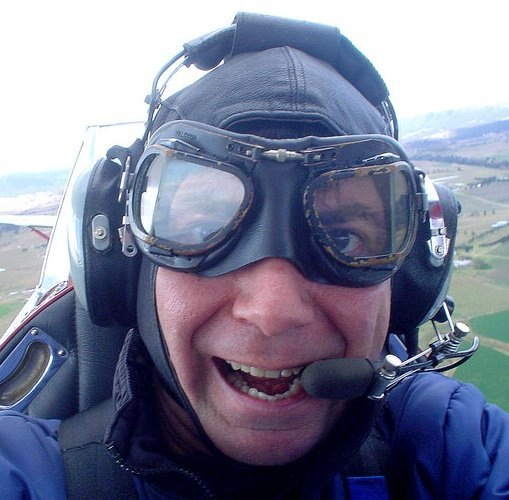
- Flying Maynard
- Born: Newcastle, New South Wales, Australia
- Other name: Maynard F# Crabbes
- Occupations: Radio host, television host, stage performer / DJ
- Known for: Triple J, The Castanet Club, Channel [V], ABC radio, Skeptic Zone
- Website: www.maynard.com.au

Maynard, formerly known as Maynard F# Crabbes, is an Australian entertainer, television presenter and radio announcer. He was a key figure in bringing the ABC's youth-oriented radio station Triple J to national prominence, and he worked at ABC radio and as a video presenter for many years. He appeared as himself in the Australian film The Castanet Club.

Since 2009, Maynard has branched out into providing podcasts, where he has become increasingly involved in the field of scepticism. In addition to his own podcasts, he is a regular featured reporter for the Australian sceptical podcast The Skeptic Zone. In 2017 the Planet Maynard podcast won the Comedy and Entertainment category from the Castaway Awards.

== Performing highlights ==
The Sydney Morning Herald summed up Maynard's performing career by saying "the man they call Maynard has been many things in his time, each incarnation usually more wacky and distinctive than the last." Over his career, Maynard has changed the format of his shows often, but the common theme to his performance has always both lampooned and celebrated popular culture in a "quirky, energetic presenting style".

His stage name "Maynard F# Crabbes" was first used in the Castanet Club as a tribute to Bob Denver's fictional beatnik character Maynard G. Krebs in the television show The Many Loves of Dobie Gillis. It was progressively shortened, first to "Maynard Crabbes", and then to the mononym "Maynard"

Musically, Maynard has made his career out of "guilty pleasures" – songs that are not fashionable, but are nevertheless loved by many people in secret. He described in an interview how this was a reaction against his primary source of fame: "Being breakfast announcer on Triple J automatically means you are one of the coolest people in the country … but I was never comfortable with that and I always liked to celebrate retro culture." He often uses the word "dag", an old-fashioned Australian slang word for "somebody who is happily unfashionable". His shows bring these into the open: "it's like dag group therapy. Once everyone gets together and admits it, they don't feel as guilty. The pleasure gets greater and the guilt gets less." Similarly, he goes out of his way to defy fashion in his dress sense: loud Hawaiian shirts are one of his signature items, and he is proud to make the "worst dressed" list on a society page.

=== Live shows ===
The Castanet Club was a stage show that started in the steel town of Newcastle in 1982. It launched entertainment careers for several of its players: as well as Maynard there was Mikey Robbins, Steve Abbott (aka the Sandman), Glen Butcher and Play School presenter Angela Moore (aka Shirley Purvis) – often under outrageous pseudonyms such as "Major Bum Sore and the Rough Riders" As the Comedy-Cabaret-Big-Band show grew more successful, they toured nationally, including a sell-out season at the 1984 Adelaide Festival where they won the "Best of the Fringe" award against approximately 300 other performers from around the country. The Castanet Club went on to play London and the Edinburgh Festival in Scotland, where audiences and critics responded well: "They were an hilarious kaleidoscope of colour, music, movement, satire and goodwill." This period is immortalised in the film they made in 1990, The Castanet Club. Despite their on-stage craziness, the Castanet Club members were highly intelligent, perhaps best demonstrated when two separate members won the television quiz show Sale of the Century: Warren Coleman and Russell Cheek. After nine years, the Castanet Club played their final show in 1991.

The Madd Club ran at the Piccadilly Hotel in Kings Cross from 1987 until 1994, with Maynard "surfing the zeitgeist of the bizarre and kooky ... with his onstage antics". Snappy dressing was vital: "Maynard and his two cohorts ... wore a stylish combination of pyjamas and floral beach wear." The show was consistently popular, filling the 400-seat venue even a Monday night, and at its peak he again took this show on tour to London.

In 1994, Fist Me | TV had Maynard and friends spending Friday and Saturday nights leaping around the stage at the popular club Kinselas, introducing celebrity guests, integrating some of his favourite television clips, playing along with a house band, and involving the audience in quizzes and karaoke. Two singles were chosen to sit at the "lovers' table" each night, and at the end the audience voted on whether they should have sex or not.

In 2002, he hosted the eponymous Maynard Show across several Sydney venues.

=== Radio ===
Maynard has been working in radio and television since 1981, initially as a volunteer at community radio station 2NUR-FM in Newcastle. From December 1985, he hosted his own program Radio Stupid on radio 2SER in Sydney on Saturday mornings, with a format partly based on The Castanet Club stage show.

He moved onto a platform with much greater exposure in the midnight-to-dawn shift on the ABC's youth-oriented radio station Triple J, and in 1987 he took over hosting their flagship Breakfast Show. At that time Triple J only broadcast to Sydney, but in 1990 it began the expansion that took it to all the other Australian capital cities. The network achieved its highest-ever figures in Melbourne, Sydney and Perth, often edging out commercial stations in their target 18- to 24-year-old group. Across Australia, he picked up an audience of more than 1.5 million listeners with Maynard leading a small group "idiosyncratic announcers" who were regarded as "the soul of the station". Maynard's Breakfast Show generally received positive reviews: The Sydney Morning Herald said that it "was consistently adventurous in the face of ever-increasing mediocrity" while The Age said that his show "provide[d] a professionalism and youthful perspective that you are unlikely to hear on any other radio station." In 1992, Maynard left the morning show, but he continued on Triple J with Sunday Afternoon Fever, a four-hour show celebrating dance music and popular culture.

This was followed by stints on commercial radio with Newcastle's NEW-FM, at Rhythm FM and as a field reporter for ABC Radio in Newcastle.

His latest show The Dirty Disbelievers started on ABC Digital Radio across Australia in December 2011, with regular guests Richard Saunders, Rachael Dunlop and Jaimie Leonarder plus music segments. It was also made available as a podcast.

=== Television ===
Maynard hosted several children's programs, starting on ABC television in the mid-1980s on The Afternoon Show with James Valentine, and in 1992 with his weekend game show Mind Twist on Ten. Other children's shows followed for the ABC, as well as pop-culture projects for the ABC such as 30 Second Special with Jaimie Leonarder (aka Jay Katz). He hosted regular shows on the Foxtel network from its first day broadcasting in Australia in 1995, including Planet Fx, a science fiction variety show that ran for two years on channel Fx, Rewind on the music channel Red, and later as a music presenter on Channel [V]. He also appeared in, or provided voice-over recordings for, advertisements on radio and television.

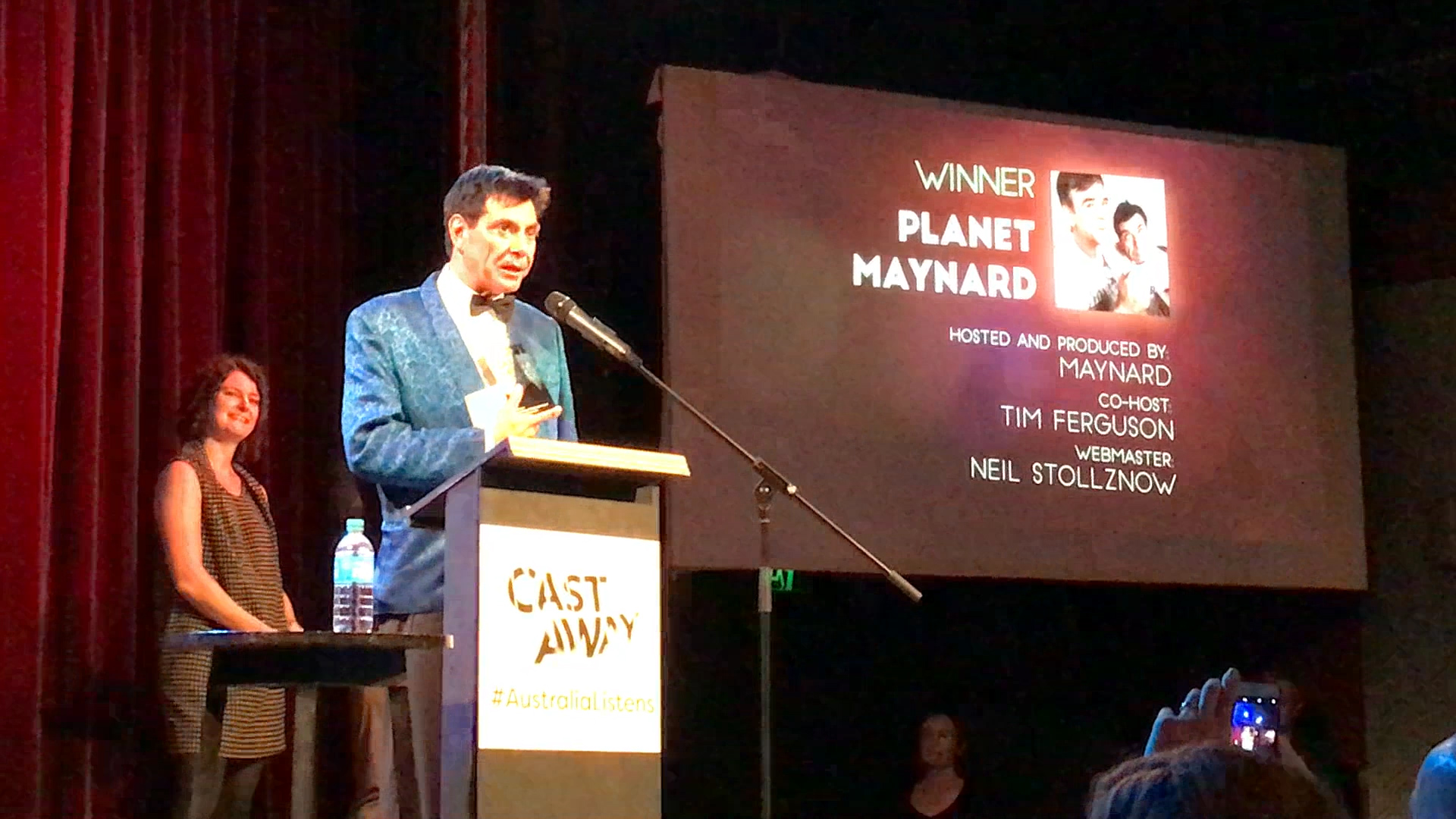
Planet Maynard wins Castaway Award 2017

=== Podcasts ===
Since February 2009, Maynard has produced Maynard's Malaise podcast, which he describes as "a journey through pop culture with no clear purpose or destination." It includes interviews with celebrities and sceptical personalities including Douglas Adams, George Hrab, Richard Saunders, Dannii Minogue, Tim Ferguson, Little Nell who played Columbia in the Rocky Horror Picture Show, Paul McDermott, and reviews of wide-ranging events including Supanova Pop Culture Expo, Sexpo, and The Amaz!ng Meeting.

Since 2010, Maynard has been a regular reporter and interviewer for the Australian sceptical podcast The Skeptic Zone. His own regular segment is Maynard's spooky action at a distance, named as a tribute to Albert Einstein's early criticism of quantum entanglement. A highlight was when the show's listeners sponsored Maynard to attend and report on The Amaz!ng Meeting in Las Vegas, USA in 2012, where he conducted over 70 interviews in the course of the event. In an interview with Rob Palmer for Skeptical Inquirer, Saunders stated about Maynard, "His specialty is interviewing. He is the best interviewer on any Australian podcast."

Starting in December 2011, his show The Dirty Disbelievers on ABC Digital Radio is also available as a podcast.

In early 2014, Maynard teamed with Tim Ferguson to start a comedy podcast named Bunga Bunga.

=== Social media ===
Beginning in April 2020 and continuing through May, Maynard presented a weekly video live-stream from his home. This "One man Madd Club" was broadcast live on Friday nights, with music, dancing, and multiple unnecessary costume changes.

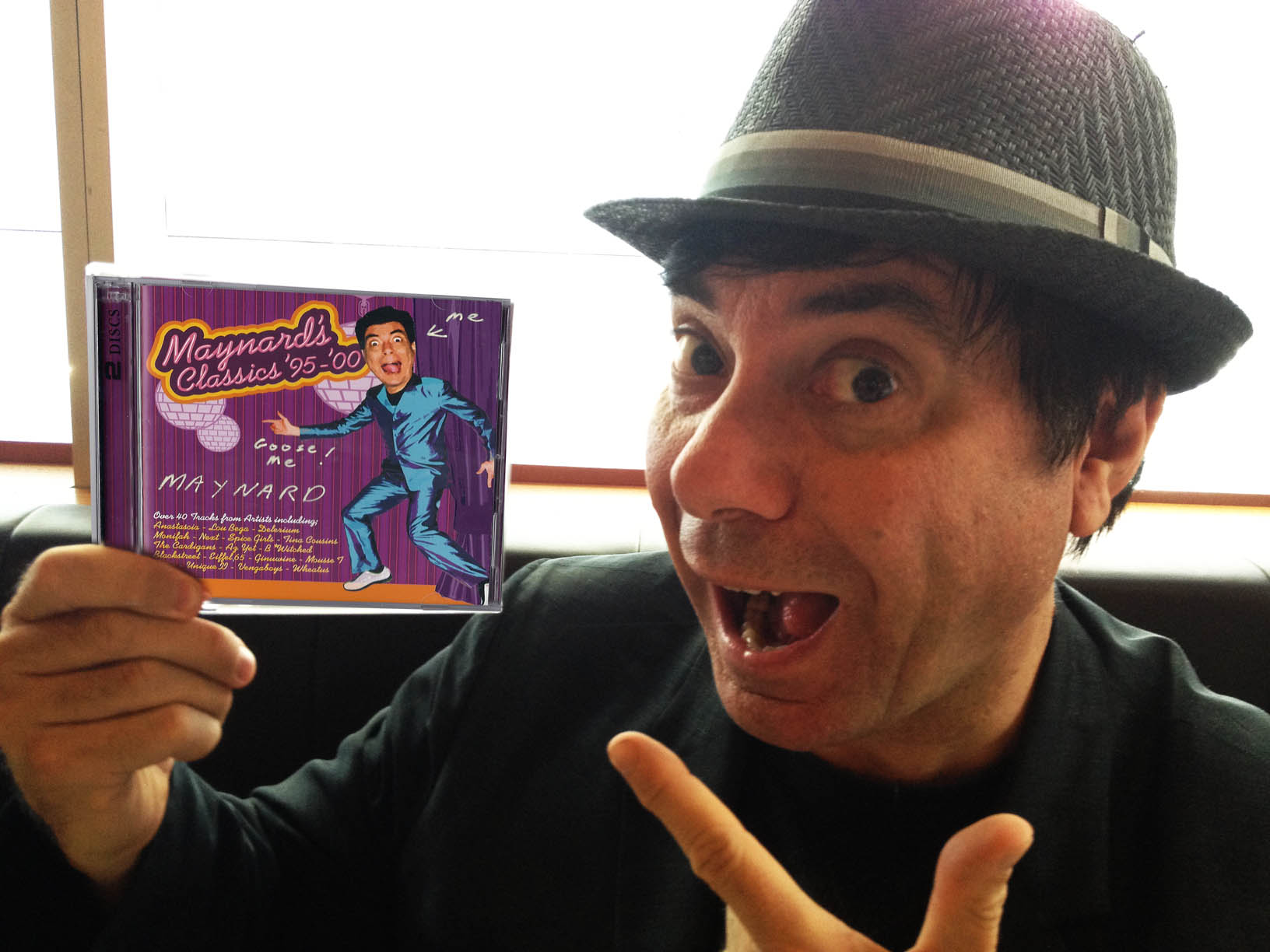
Maynard with one of his CD releases

== Published works ==
Books

- Crabbes, Maynard F# (1991). Maynard's Guide to Dag. North Ryde, N.S.W.: Angus & Robertson. ISBN 020717363X.
- Crabbes, Maynard F# (1992). Maynard's Dag Quiz Book. Chippendale, N.S.W.: Sun Australia. ISBN 0725107103.

CDs

- Maynard F# Crabbes Presents 18 Explosive Hits And One Real Loser released 1990
- Maynard's Classics '90–'95 (2-disc set).
- Maynard's Mirrorball Classics '95–'00 (2-disc set), released 20 January 2004 on the Central Station and MSI labels.
