= Harry Potter (journalist) =

Australian journalist (1941–2014)

Harry Potter (20 July 1941 – 8 May 2014) was an Australian journalist, television reporter and presenter. A veteran police and crime reporter whose career spanned more than fifty years, Potter first joined Ten Eyewitness News, a nightly news show on Network Ten, in 1978. In 2013, Harry Potter became the first recipient of the Lifetime Achievement award at the Kennedy Awards.

== Personal life ==
Potter was married to journalist Katrina Lee. He had four children. Potter was diagnosed with cancer in the early 2000s. He died from cancer on 8 May 2014, at the age of 72.

== Legacy ==
Hamish McLean, the CEO of Ten Network Holdings (the parent company of Network Ten), called Potter "a giant of Australian journalism." According to Ten Eyewitness News presenter Sandra Sully, a "journalist of the year" award, named in honour of Potter, would continue to be awarded in his memory.
