= SportsNight with James Bracey =

Australian television sports commentary program

- Title card of SportsNight with James Bracey
- Genre: News, Sports, Commentary
- Presented by: James Bracey
- Country of origin: Australia
- Original language: English
- No. of seasons: 4

Production
- Running time: 1 hour

Original release
- Network: Sky News Australia
- Release: 27 January 2013 – 15 December 2016

SportsNight with James Bracey is an Australian television sports news and commentary program previously broadcast 4 nights weekly on Sky News Australia, hosted by James Bracey. The program was broadcast from the Sky News centre in the Sydney suburb of Macquarie Park. The program covers the latest news in local and international sports, and discusses it with a rotating panel of commentators.

On 7 April 2015, the program had an all female panel for the first time, with Rebecca Wilson, Melinda Gainsford-Taylor and Liz Ellis. The set featured pink lighting to celebrate.

While a 30-minute edition simply titled SportsNight was airing on the remaining three nights, the show was expanded to one hour from 18 December 2015 from Fridays to Sunday, hosted by Luke Doherty.

The program ended after 4 years on 15 December 2016, following Bracey's decision to leave Sky News. It was announced that the program would not be renewed with a new host, instead replaced by a second hour of Paul Murray Live.

== See also ==
- List of Australian television series
