= The Fat =

- Genre: Talk show
- Presented by: Tony Squires; Rebecca Wilson; Peter Wilkins
- Country of origin: Australia
- Original language: English
- No. of seasons: 4

Original release
- Network: ABC TV
- Release: 6 March 2000 – 18 November 2003

Related
- 110% Tony Squires

The Fat is an Australian sports based talk show television series, broadcast and produced by ABC TV. The series began on 6 March 2000, and ended on 18 November 2003.

== Synopsis ==
Host Tony Squires, with regulars Peter Wilkins and Rebecca Wilson ran through the week's sporting news, showing the lighter side of things.

== Cast ==
=== Main ===
- Tony Squires (host)
- Peter Wilkins
- Rebecca Wilson
- Slammin' Sam Kekovich

=== Regular guests ===
- Dr Turf (John Rothfield)
- Kerry O'Keeffe
- Wil Anderson
- Jason Akermanis
- Liz Ellis
- Mikey Robins
- Matthew Hardy
- James O'Loghlin
- Dave Hughes
- Greg Fleet

=== Other guests ===
- Nici Andronicus
- Duncan Armstrong
- Clare Balding
- Ron Barassi
- Kevin Bartlett
- Peter Beattie
- Peter Berner
- Sandy Blythe
- Raelene Boyle
- Elaine Canty
- Greg Chappell
- Simon Crean
- Laurie Daley
- Andrew Denton
- John Dybvig
- Kitty Flanagan
- Lisa Forrest
- Karla Gilbert
- Boothby Graffoe
- Johanna Griggs
- Wendy Harmer
- Lauren Hewitt
- Merv Hughes
- Jimeoin
- Tania Lacy
- Geoff Lawson
- Bill Leak
- Dale Lewis
- Troy Luff
- Stuart MacGill
- John Maclean
- Wally Masur
- Jim Maxwell
- Justin Melvey
- Scott Miller
- Steve Moneghetti
- Anthony Mundine
- George Negus
- H.G. Nelson
- Dave O'Neil
- Tex Perkins
- Sue-Ann Post
- Kerri Pottharst
- Steven Price
- Rod Quantock
- Tim Ross
- Louise Sauvage
- Mel Schumacher
- Bob Skinstad
- Adam Spencer
- Miles Stewart
- Jim Stynes
- Tania Van Heer
- Lisa-Marie Vizaniari
- Kevin Walters
- Debbie Watson
- Merrick Watts
- Tracey Wickham
- Craig Williams
