= Peter Shann Ford =

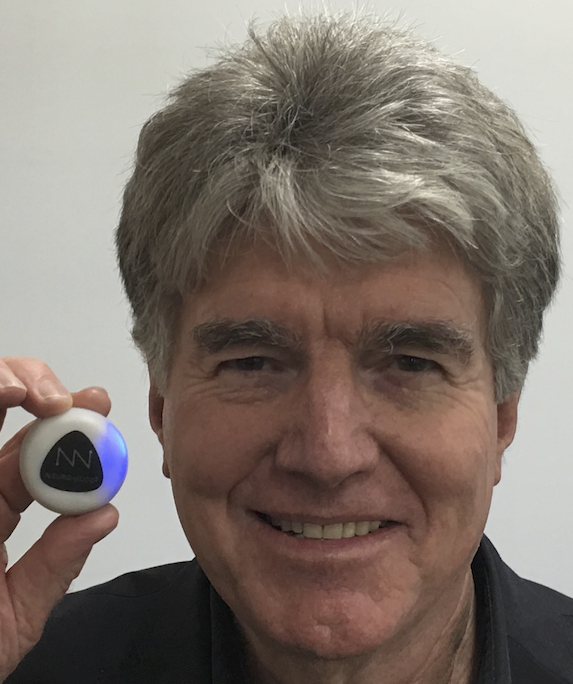
Control Bionics founder Peter Ford with NeuroNode

Peter Shann Ford is the Australian Founder of Control Bionics [ASX: CBL], a neural systems technology company, and the inventor of NeuroSwitch, a patented EMG (electromyograph) and EOG (electroocculography) based communications and control system for people with profound disabilities including locked-in syndrome.

In 2025, he founded Electric Body XPB, [Xtreme Personal Best] employing two decades of clinical grade EMG technology to enable elite athletes to improve their personal best drug free.
