= Mikey Robins =

Australian broadcaster and comedian

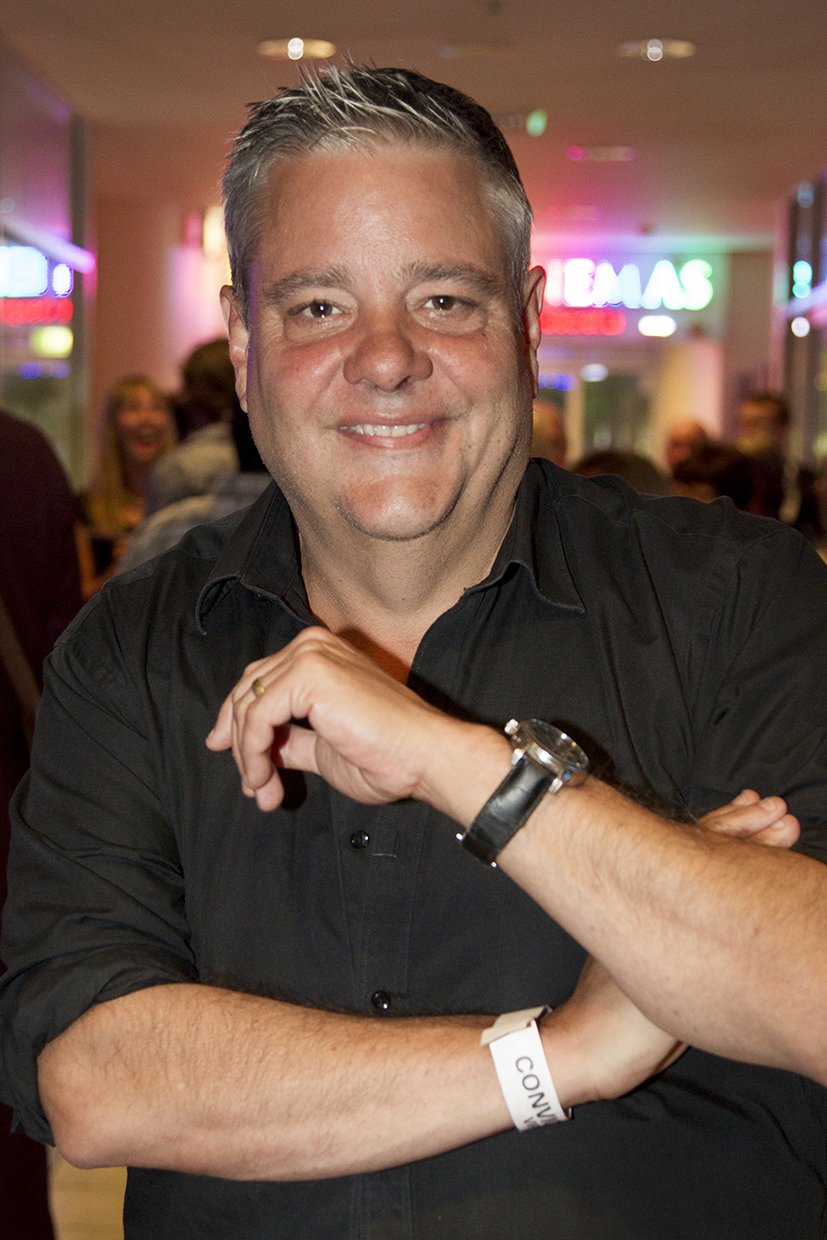
- Robins at the Premiere of "CONVICT" the movie, 20 Jan 2014
- Born: Mikel Mason Robins; 8 December 1961 (age 64); Newcastle, New South Wales, Australia
- Notable work: Team captain, Good News Week (1996–2000, 2008–2012)
- Spouse: Laura Williams (1999–present)

Comedy career
- Medium: Television, radio, books

Mikel Mason "Mikey" Robins (born 8 December 1961) is an Australian media personality, comedian and writer. He is best known for the satirical game show Good News Week, which ran on the ABC and Network Ten between 1996 and 2000, and returned again when the series was resurrected in February 2008.

== Early life and education ==
Robins was born in Newcastle, New South Wales.

He attended Newcastle High School.

He attended the University of Newcastle, where he obtained a Bachelor of Arts degree with a double major in English and Drama.

== Career ==
In his teens, he worked as a parcel pickup boy at Woolworths, Garden City, Kotara, and as a barman at the Mary Ellen Hotel, Merewether.

He was a member of The Castanet Club with Steve Abbott and Maynard.

Robins was a breakfast radio presenter for the Australian FM radio station Triple J for seven years, ending in 1999. His co-presenters included Helen Razer (1994 or earlier), Paul McDermott (1997), Jen Oldershaw and The Sandman (Steve Abbott) (1998). He formally co-hosted the breakfast program on Sydney radio station Triple M with Amanda Keller in 2001 and then Vega 95.3 alongside Tony Squires and Rebecca Wilson.

The recognition he gained through Triple J launched Robins's career in television comedy; he appeared on Live and Sweaty and was a regular on McFeast before joining McDermott on Good News Week in 1996. He remained with Good News Week throughout its initial run between 1996 and 2000, and when Network Ten renewed the series in 2008 he returned in his original role.

Robins's other television projects have included several documentaries on Australian pubs such as Mikey, Pubs and Beer Nuts, as well as appearances on the ABC series The Fat, and the Seven Network's breakfast program, Sunrise. He played the character of Reg Linchpin on the ABC's Mr Squiggle and Friends in 1989–1990. In 2005, he was a contestant on the TV show Australian's Brainiest Comedian. In the final round, he beat Bob Downe, winning the game by one point. He was presented with a trophy and won A$20,000, which he donated to the NSW Autism Association.

Robins is also a published author, having co-written two books, Three Beers and a Chinese Meal (with Helen Razer), a bestseller, and Big Man's World (with Tony Squires and Steve Abbott).

== Personal life ==
In 1999, Robins married his long-time partner Laura Williams.

Robins is a supporter of the rugby league club South Sydney Rabbitohs.

=== Health issues ===
Robins's father, Bill, sold hair-care products and worked for a time as an announcer at weekend surf lifesaving carnivals, which Robins says was his "introduction to talking into a microphone". When he was eight, Robins's father was diagnosed with cancer and died two years later. Robins claims he reacted to his father's death by eating more and giving up sports, pointing to this as the beginning of his battle with obesity. His obesity was a frequent source of comedy in his performances, but also held serious health implications. In 2003, he was diagnosed with extreme sleep apnea which caused him to stop breathing around 70 times an hour while he slept, due in large part to his weight.

In addition, he suffered from high cholesterol, borderline type 2 diabetes, abnormal liver function and poor mobility. In 2006, he underwent lapband bariatric surgery to combat his obesity. At the time, Robins weighed close to 150 kg; in an episode of Australian Story that aired on 3 July 2007, he announced that he had lost around 65 kg to date.

== Bibliography ==
=== Author ===
- Razer, Helen; Robins, Mikey (1995). 3 Beers and a Chinese Meal. Milsons Point, NSW: Random House Australia. ISBN 0091830729.
- Squires, Tony; Robins, Mikey; Abbott, Steve (1998). Big Man's World. Milsons Point, NSW: Random House Australia. ISBN 0091833817.
- Robins, Mikey (2018). Seven Deadly Sins and One Very Naughty Fruit. Sydney, NSW: Simon & Schuster (Australia). ISBN 978-1925750164.
- Robins, Mikey (5 August 2020). Reprehensible. Simon & Schuster. ISBN 9781760852993.

=== Contributor ===
- Mikey Robins and nephew Markus Williams (2007). "Contributor". Laugh Even Louder!. By Camp Quality. Gosford, New South Wales: Scholastic Australia Pty Limited. ISBN 978-1-74169-022-4.
