= Sunrise (Australian TV program) =

Australian breakfast television show

- Genre: Breakfast entertainment program
- Presented by: Natalie Barr; Matt Shirvington; Edwina Bartholomew; Sam Mac
- Opening theme: (Reach Up for The) Sunrise by Duran Duran
- Composers: Simon Le Bon; John Taylor; Roger Taylor; Andy Taylor; Nick Rhodes
- Country of origin: Australia
- Original language: English
- No. of seasons: 31
- No. of episodes: 5,000+

Production
- Executive producer: Jake Lyle
- Production locations: Epping, New South Wales (1991–2004); Martin Place, New South Wales (2004–2023); Television City, South Eveleigh, New South Wales (2023–present)
- Running time: 210 minutes (3.5 hours)

Original release
- Network: Seven Network
- Release: 14 January 1991 – present

Related
- Weekend Sunrise; The Morning Show

Sunrise is an Australian breakfast show program. It is broadcast on the Seven Network, and is hosted by Natalie Barr and Matt Shirvington. The program follows Sunrise Early News, and runs from 5:30 am to 9:00 am. It is followed by The Morning Show.

== History ==
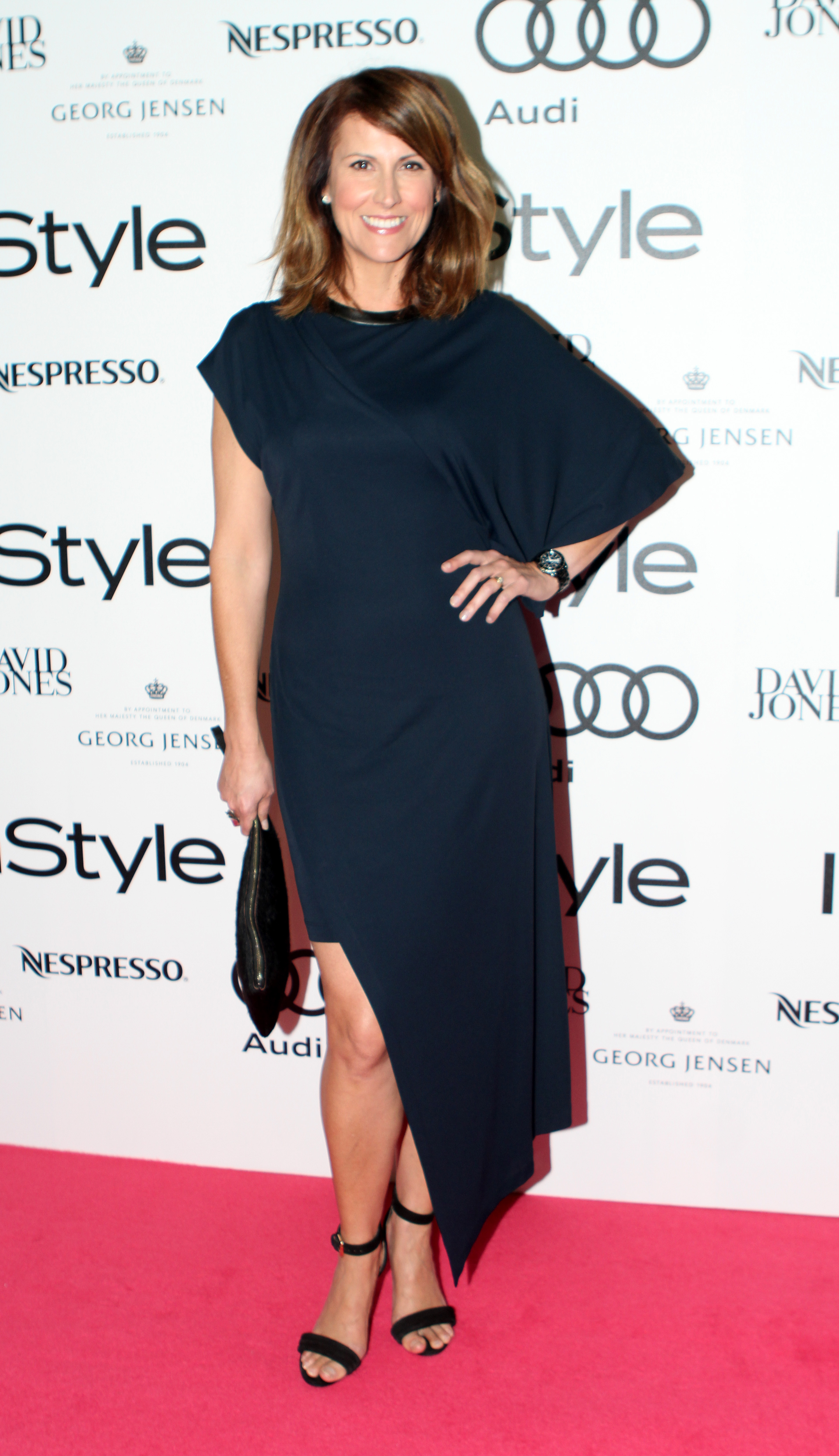
Natalie Barr, host

The history of Sunrise can be traced back to 14 January 1991 when 11AM news presenter Darren McDonald began presenting an early morning Seven News – Sunrise Edition bulletin, three days prior to the Gulf War's start.

In 1996, Seven introduced a one-hour weekday bulletin called Sunrise News, later renamed Sunrise. Seven recruited Chris Bath from NBN Television to present the bulletin alongside Peter Ford. Ford moved to other presenting roles in 1996 and was replaced by finance editor David Koch. In 1997, Chris Bath was transferred to Seven's 10.30 pm News and was replaced by Melissa Doyle. Sport presenter Nick McArdle and reporter Natalie Barr were regular substitute presenters. Seven launched a Sunday edition hosted by Stan Grant, entitled Sunday Sunrise, in 1997. Weekday Sunrise was cancelled in 1999, replaced by children's program The Big Breakfast. Seven maintained half-hourly news updates during The Big Breakfast and their Sunday bulletin was not affected by the axing. Other temporary Sunrise hosts up until this time include Anne Fulwood (who was filling in for Georgie Gardner at the time of the program's end), Leigh Hatcher and Nick McArdle (previously weekend sport presenter, Seven News Sydney).

During the 2000 Summer Olympics, Andrew Daddo and Johanna Griggs presented Olympic Sunrise from a leased apartment near Lavender Bay, in Sydney which provided the Sydney Harbour Bridge and Sydney Opera House as waterside backdrops.

On 1 May 2000, the program was replaced by a new version of Sunrise produced by Adam Boland. It was hosted by Georgie Gardner and Melbourne sport reporter Mark Beretta. It was followed by music video program AMV.

According to Boland's Brekky Central, in late 2001 producers had created a plan to take on Today on the Nine Network, the leader at breakfast, taking inspiration from Fox America's Fox and Friends. Set to debut in March 2002, the multimillion-dollar production would have its own dedicated studio and fronted by Australian Radio personality Andrew Daddo and Lisa Forrest. However a month before its launch, the network's board axed the idea and believed money could be better spent.

In 2002, Seven revamped their breakfast television schedule with Seven Early News at 6:00 am, hosted by Chris Reason (which only lasted around one week), and a new version of Sunrise from 6:30 am to 9:00 am, hosted by Reason and Melissa Doyle. Sunrise ran from 6:00 am to 9:00 am from February the same year. David Koch was brought in to present the finance reports. In October of that year, Reason discovered he had another cancerous tumour behind his kidney and had to resign from his position. Four years earlier he had undergone treatment for another growth. Koch was appointed temporary presenter, a position later made permanent.

Sunrise was yet again revamped in December 2002 soon after Koch's appointment, focusing less on hard news and became more family friendly. The show, along with its rival Today on Nine, have become more tabloid focused which has boosted ratings.

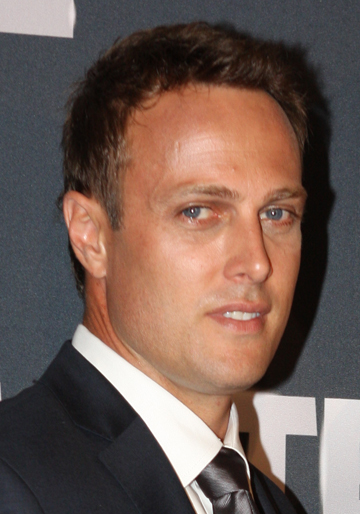
Matt Shirvington, host

In 2003, the show began to pick up ratings, and appointed Natalie Barr to present the news updates, followed by the appointment of former Network Ten journalist Grant Denyer to present weather reports, then the re-appointment of Mark Beretta, who was brought in to present sports updates. The new plan to take on Today, following the ratings rise, was some dramatic point of difference which included news updates every thirty minutes, big interviews, less formal presenting than a news bulletin, "the soapbox", ROS wall, natural chemistry but most importantly a shift in viewers interest. "Kochie" and "Mel", as they became informally known, relied less on scripts but more on talking points. They would debate the issues of the day and the viewers would heavily influence those topics. Some of these changes were not well received by members of Seven's news department who felt the shift in tone negatively impacted on the brand, and at one point then-Seven CEO Maureen Plavsic demanded Koch be fired only to be overruled by Kerry Stokes.

On 30 August 2004, Sunrise, Seven News Sydney and Seven Morning News moved from their studios in Epping to the new Seven News centre at Martin Place.

On 29 January 2007, Sunrise had a complete makeover with changes to the set and on-screen graphics. Due to continued viewer feedback, the Sunrise set changed again on 10 June 2007; specifically, the new set includes more of the city into its shots by the installation of smart glass. This glass, similar to that used on the Boeing 787 airliner, allows for the transparency of the glass to be adjusted, ranging from clear, to partially transparent to completely opaque, showing as a solid blue. These changes have proved useful in shielding viewers from the actions of some passers by, notably the cast members of the ABC show The Chaser's War on Everything and the protests surrounding the 2018 Aboriginal adoption controversy. The set was also modified so The Morning Show's set could fit into the Martin Place current affairs studio. In October 2009, it was announced that at the start of 2010, Sunrise would receive a brand new set, format, graphics and logo on 25 January 2010.

In April 2010, Sunrise added a feature show that shows a selection of highlights from the previous day's (or in the case of Monday, Friday) Sunrise. the show known as Sunrise Extra aired at 5am each weekday prior to Seven Early News.

A Sunrise reporter reporting outside the Australian Broadcasting Corporation's Ultimo studios in Sydney, New South Wales.

In 2011, there was much speculation that Melissa Doyle would be leaving the show to present Today Tonight and that David Koch may be moved to a prime-time position. However, Doyle continued with the show for her tenth consecutive year in 2012, as did Koch.

On 29 February 2012, Sunrise celebrated its 10th anniversary with Doyle and Koch. Doyle is the only original presenter remaining from the March 2002 launch; at the time, Chris Reason was her co-host (he took leave in late 2002 to fight cancer, prompting the initial then-temporary appointment of Koch) and Koch was the finance analyst. Koch started presenting Sunrise on a permanent basis from 4 October 2002.

In May 2013, Sunrise broadcast once a week from the Seven Network's Melbourne studios (HSV-7) to attempt and capture a growing Melbourne audience. Sunrise has been trailing Today (and, since 2008, News Breakfast on the ABC) in the Melbourne market since 2008. The show was broadcast from the stations AFL Game Day set. This was discontinued later on after continually poor ratings.

On 20 June 2013 during the program, Doyle announced that she was leaving Sunrise after 14 years to front a new prime time Network News initiative. She stated, "It's with that experience and support from the team that I am able to take this next step. I'm honoured that the Network has given me this incredible new opportunity and I am unbelievably excited about the new challenges ahead." It was later announced that Samantha Armytage would be replacing Doyle as co-host alongside Koch.

In February 2016, Sunrise received a new set and graphics and was extended by 30 minutes to start at 5:30 am, matching the starting time of rival Today. This resulted in Seven Early News being moved to the 5:00 am timeslot and Sunrise Extra being cancelled. Edwina Bartholomew announced that she would be departing her role as weather presenter with Sam Mac announced as her replacement.

In June 2020, it was announced Natalie Barr would host the show two days a week, after Samantha Armytage requested a reduced workload. Barr presented with David Koch on Mondays, and with Armytage on Fridays. However, in September 2020, it was announced that Koch and Armytage would revert to a five-day working week with Natalie Barr resuming her news role.

In January 2021, Koch and Armytage reverted to a four-day week, with Matt Doran and Natalie Barr co-hosting on Fridays, with Edwina Bartholomew as news presenter.

On 8 March 2021, Armytage announced that she would be resigning as co-host, to spend more time with her family. Her final show was on 11 March 2021 On 14 March 2021, it was confirmed Natalie Barr would officially replace Armytage as co-host. Edwina Bartholomew replaced Barr as news presenter.

On 29 May 2023, David Koch announced his departure from Sunrise, ending a 21-year run on the breakfast show. Koch's replacement, Matt Shirvington was announced on 5 June 2023. Koch's last day was on 9 June 2023.

On 24 July 2023, Sunrise hosted its very first broadcast at its new studio base in Television City, South Eveleigh. The first edition went to air live at 5:30 am, with hosts Natalie Barr and Matt Shirvington, news presenter Edwina Bartholomew and sport presenter Mark Beretta, followed by The Morning Show's Larry Emdur and Kylie Gillies as well as other Seven News broadcasts. With this change, the show received a rebranding along with The Morning Show.

In March 2024, Jodie Speers announced her resignation from the Seven Network. Seven Early News bulletin was renamed Sunrise Early News and Speers was replaced by Edwina Bartholomew.

On 27 November 2025, Mark Beretta announced his resignation from Sunrise after 22 years, with his final appearance on 12 December. He is expected to continue working with the Seven Network on special projects to be announced.

=== Special editions ===
Prior to 2010, Sunrise occasionally aired two special Saturday editions. This included, since 2003:

- 22 March 2003 – Koch and Melissa Doyle hosted a special Saturday edition of Sunrise covering the latest on the Iraq war as it happened, and the 2003 New South Wales state election, which was occurring that day. This also saw the rise of Natalie Barr as news presenter.
- 24 November 2007 (as Weekend Sunrise) – a special edition hosted by Andrew O'Keefe and Armytage covering the final day of the 2007 election campaign. Talitha Cummins presented the news, while Kylie Gillies presented the sport.
- 17 July 2010 (as Weekend Sunrise) – A special edition hosted by Larry Emdur and Rebecca Maddern covering from 7:00 am to 1:30 pm, Australian prime minister Julia Gillard's trip to Government House to talk with the Governor General, Quentin Bryce, and her press conference at Government House about an election to be held on 21 August and Tony Abbott's press conference in Brisbane. Sarah Cumming presented the news, Simon Reeve presented the sport and James Tobin presented the weather.
- The weeks of 10–14 January and 17–21 January – Sunrise was extended to start at 5:00 am and going on past 9:00 am on these mornings to cover the ongoing 2010–2011 Queensland floods and 2011 Victorian floods with Seven News picking up the rest of the coverage. As a result, the tennis coverage was moved to 7two (week of 10–14 January) and Sunrise extended to finish at 10:00 am (week of 17–21 January).
- 22 February 2011 – Koch reported live from Christchurch on the 2011 Christchurch earthquake.
- 26 January 2012 – Sunrise aired live from a mini-barge celebrating Australia Day on Sydney Harbour. Some viewers were given the opportunity to join the Sunrise team after entering an online competition.
- 16 December 2014 – Sunrise reported live from 4:00 am to 9:00 am for the coverage of the 2014 Sydney hostage crisis.
- 9 September 2022 – after the announcement of the death of Her Majesty Queen Elizabeth II, David Koch and Natalie Barr provided wall-to-wall coverage from 5:00am until 12 noon. All on-air talent wore black, in line with royal protocol for national mourning, up to and including the late Queen's funeral on 19 September 2022.
- 15 December 2025 - an extended edition of Sunrise in the aftermath of the Bondi terror attack which went until midday, with rolling coverage after from 7NEWS.

=== Musical guests ===
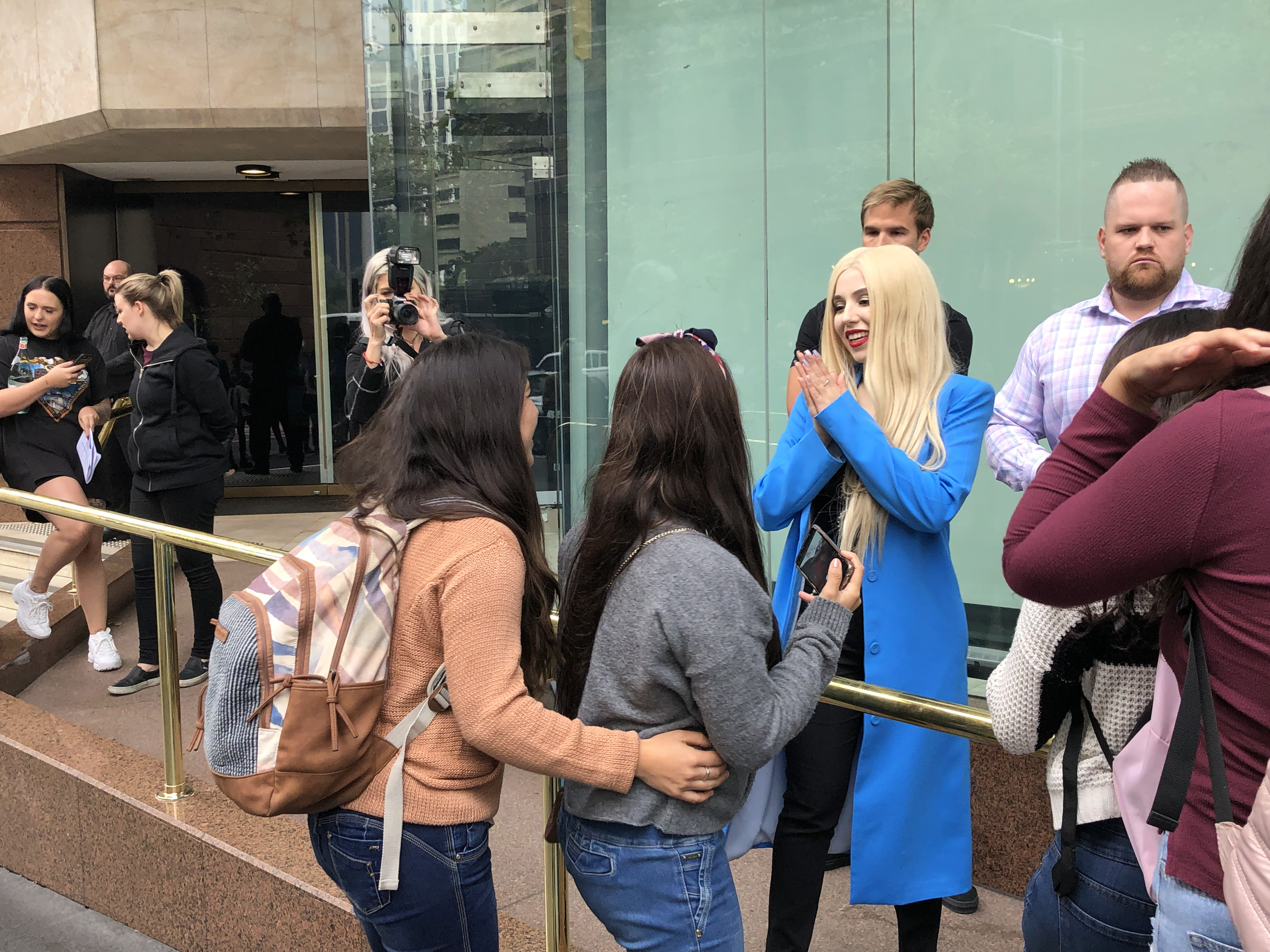
US pop singer Ava Max meeting fans outside the Sunrise studios following a promotional appearance in April 2019.

A number of musical guests have appeared on Sunrise and performed live action the show, usually meeting fans afterwards. Like the rest of the studio, their stage area gives people on the street a chance to view the performances. Occasionally, musical guests perform "on the plaza" on a temporary stage erected in Martin Place. Musical performances normally take place at 7:50am and 8:50am, with most guests playing two songs.

=== Weekend Sunrise ===
In 2005 the Seven Network replaced its struggling Sunday morning program Sunday Sunrise with a program called Weekend Sunrise which originally was an hour long (8am – 9am) program with an identical format to Sunrise. Hosted by Chris Reason (then the presenter of Sunday Sunrise) and Lisa Wilkinson, the program was successful and various critiques at the time called for the program to be lengthened to two hours (7am – 9am) and be extended to Saturday mornings as well as Sunday.

In 2006, Weekend Sunrise was extended from an hour to a two-hour show, running every Sunday from 8:00 am till 10:00 am. When Sportsworld returned for the football season Weekend Sunrise settled into a 90-minute format from 8:00 am to 9:30 am. After Sportsworld's series concluded, the show returned to a two-hour format.

Andrew O'Keefe initially temporarily replaced host Chris Reason in 2006, but after improved ratings he was given the hosting position permanently. In 2007, Wilkinson moved to the Nine Network to host Today and was replaced by Samantha Armytage. In 2008, Weekend Sunrise moved their start time 30 minutes earlier to 7:30 am to match the new start time of Nine's Sunday program. The program continued to run through to 10:00 am, meaning that the program had a two-and-a-half-hour running time.

In 2009, the program's start time was moved even earlier. Originally, rival Nine Network announced that Today on Sunday (now Weekend Today), the replacement of the long-running Sunday, would run from 7:30 am to 9:00 am. But this was changed on 28 January 2009 to 7:00 am to 9:00 am. As result, Seven announced that Weekend Sunrise would also commence at 7:00 am and run to 10:00 am, meaning the program would go for three hours, the same as the weekday version of Sunrise.

On 13 February 2010, Seven announced that Weekend Sunrise would extend to Saturdays to compete against Weekend Today. The Saturday edition airs in the same time slot as Weekend Today (7:00 am to 10:00 am). Saturday Disney, which previously occupied the timeslot, aired its last two hours of their program on 7flix (the first hour, from 6:00 am – 7:00 am, preceded Weekend Sunrise on the Seven Network). The original Saturday team consisted of Samantha Armytage co-hosting with Larry Emdur with Sarah Cumming, Simon Reeve and James Tobin presenting news, sport and weather respectively.

In June 2013, Melissa Doyle announced that she would be leaving Sunrise for a national network role with Samantha Armytage replacing her. Monique Wright therefore initially replaced Armytage on Weekend Sunrise, but it was not until February 2014 that she was made a permanent co-host on the show.

In December 2017, Andrew O'Keefe resigned citing a desire to spend more time with his family. In March 2018, it was announced that Basil Zempilas would replace O'Keefe.

In September 2019, Basil Zempilas announced his resignation as regular host of Weekend Sunrise, citing a desire to spend more time with his family, but would still appear on the show intermittently as a summer and fill-in presenter whenever required. In October 2019, it was announced that Matt Doran would replace Zempilas on the show from 12 October.

In November 2024, Matt Doran announced he was leaving Weekend Sunrise to focus on family and pursue other opportunities. Doran's final show was on 8 December 2024. US Bureau Chief David Woiwod had been announced days later as the replacement of Doran as co-host of Weekend Sunrise. His first show was 14 December 2024

As of January 2026, Monique Wright and David Woiwod are the co-hosts, with Sally Bowrey and James Tobin presenting news, sport and weather respectively.

== Format ==
Like most other breakfast television shows, Sunrise blends a mixture of news every thirty minutes, interviews and light-hearted feature pieces into three hours each morning. Often they will go out and present the show from other locations, such as Hawaii, Las Vegas, Athens, Disneyland, Beijing and Melbourne for the Commonwealth Games, Beaconsfield in Tasmania and Dreamworld on the Gold Coast. A major feature of the show is that the viewer can send in their responses to stories via email, SMS, phone, Facebook and Twitter. Viewers can also bring up issues they want reviewed or investigated and it is recorded on the ROSwall (Responses of Sunrisers).

=== News and traffic reports ===
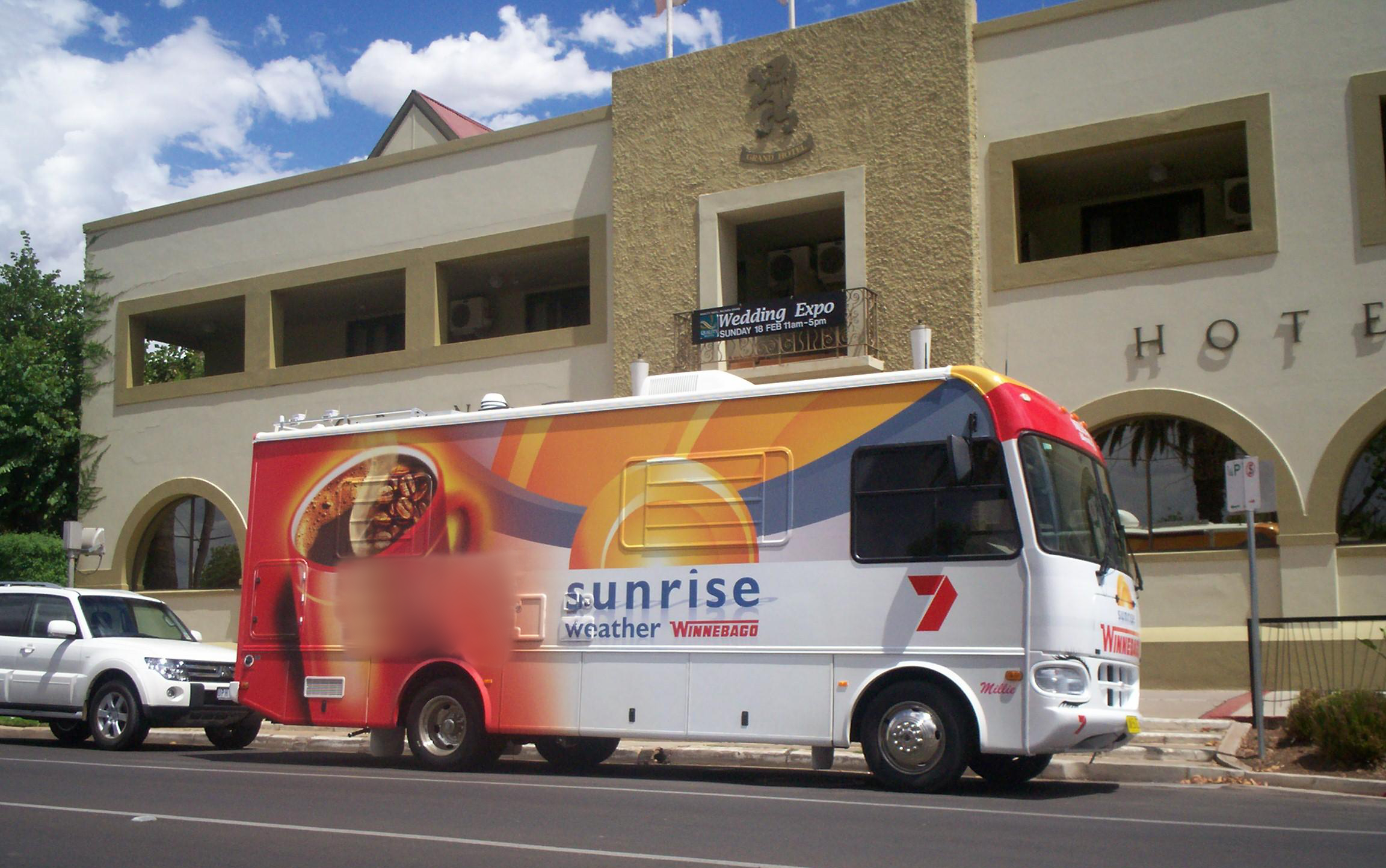
The Sunrise Weather Winnebago in Mildura

Local news updates, following the national news updates at 6am, 7am, and 8am were launched on 28 May 2007, offering viewers in Sydney, Melbourne, Brisbane, Adelaide, Hobart, and Perth news specific to their city. Prior to this, local weather and capital city traffic updates had already been inserted into the program. These were removed in June 2008, following the commencement of Seven Early News, due to logistical reasons.

Traffic reports are shown at four regular intervals during the show, presented from a helicopter or a traffic management centre. Traffic reports air in the metropolitan markets of Melbourne, Sydney, Brisbane, Adelaide, and Perth. They are produced and presented by traffic reporters from the Australian Traffic Network.

==== Local bulletins ====
Since May 2015, and between October 2021 and April 2022 respectively, Western Australia and Queensland have both received localised news updates, addressing the time differences between the states and the Australian eastern seaboard, especially during daylight saving when the two states are three hours and one hour, respectively, behind New South Wales, the Australian Capital Territory, Victoria and Tasmania. Both markets include news items from local reporters as well as statewide weather updates in place of the national sport and weather updates presented by Katie Brown and Sam Mac, respectively.

Western Australia (since May 2015)

Western Australia's local news updates are presented by Matt Tinney from Seven's Perth studios and air every half-hour from 5:30 am, prior to the national news update. Amelia Broun is the main fill-in presenter.

Queensland (October 2021 – April 2022)

Queensland's local news updates were presented by Bianca Stone from Seven's Brisbane studios and aired every half-hour from 6:00 am, prior to the national news update. These local news updates were discontinued in April 2022 when New South Wales, the Australian Capital Territory, Victoria and Tasmania rejoined Queensland in the same AEST timezone.

== Hosts ==
| Presenter | Role | Tenure |
|---|---|---|
| Natalie Barr | Co-host | 2021–present |
| Matt Shirvington | Co-host and Sport | 2023–present |
| Edwina Bartholomew & Monique Wright | News & Entertainment | 2021–present |
| Sam Mac | Weather | 2016–present |

Host timeline
| Tenure | Presenter | |
|---|---|---|
| 1996 | Peter Ford | Chris Bath |
| 1996–1997 | David Koch | Chris Bath |
| 1997–1999 | David Koch | Melissa Doyle |
| 2000–2002 | Mark Beretta | Georgie Gardner |
| 2002 | Chris Reason | Melissa Doyle |
| 2002–2013 | David Koch | Melissa Doyle |
| 2013–2021 | David Koch | Samantha Armytage |
| 2021–2023 | David Koch | Natalie Barr |
| 2023–present | Matt Shirvington | Natalie Barr |

Timeline of other Presenters
| Tenure | Presenter Role | | | |
| Tenure | News | Sport | Weather | Entertainment |
|---|---|---|---|---|
| 2002–2004 | Natalie Barr | – | – | – |
| 2004–2006 | Natalie Barr | Mark Beretta | Grant Denyer | – |
| 2006–2007 | Natalie Barr | Mark Beretta | Monique Wright | – |
| 2008 | Natalie Barr | Mark Beretta | David Brown | – |
| 2009 | Natalie Barr | Mark Beretta | Fifi Box | Nuala Hafner |
| 2010–2012 | Natalie Barr | Mark Beretta | Grant Denyer | Fifi Box |
| 2013 | Natalie Barr | Mark Beretta | Grant Denyer | – |
| 2013–2016 | Natalie Barr | Mark Beretta | Edwina Bartholomew | – |
| 2016–2021 | Natalie Barr | Mark Beretta | Sam Mac | Edwina Bartholomew |
| 2021–2025 | Edwina Bartholomew/Monique Wright | Mark Beretta | Sam Mac | Edwina Bartholomew |
| 2026–present | Edwina Bartholomew/Monique Wright | Matt Shirvington | Sam Mac | Edwina Bartholomew |

== Fill-in presenters ==
Current presenters who have been fill-in hosts or co-hosts of Sunrise in recent times include Edwina Bartholomew, Monique Wright, David Woiwod, Kylie Gillies, Michael Usher, Sally Bowrey, Hugh Whitfeld, Mike Amor, Larry Emdur and Chris Reason.

Fill-in presenters for other roles, in order from most likely to be used to least likely to be used:

- News: Monique Wright, Sally Bowrey, David Woiwod and Angie Asimus.
- Weather: James Tobin and Katie Brown.

Other presenters who have either filled in presenting Sunrise in the past include Andrew O'Keefe, Kellie Sloane, Mark Beretta, Matt Doran, Matt White, Mike Munro, Nick McArdle, Ben Davis, Chris Reason, Bruce McAvaney, Jennifer Keyte, Sarah Cumming, Teegan Dolling, Mylee Hogan, Ann Sanders, Jessica Rowe, Emmy Kubainski, Rosanna Mangiarelli, Ryan Phelan, Sharyn Ghidella, Basil Zempilas, Kendall Gilding, Peta Jane Madam, Jim Wilson and Ben Damon.

== Reporters ==
| 7NEWS/Sunrise correspondents and reporter/s | City/state |
|---|---|
| Katie Brown | Varies |
| Liam Tapper (primary); Sam Payne (secondary) | Sydney |
| Teegan Dolling (primary); Andrew McCormack (secondary) | Melbourne |
| Georgie Chumbley (primary); Georgia Costi (secondary) | Brisbane |
| Hayden Nelson | Adelaide |
| Matt Tinney | Perth |

== Regulars ==
| Presenter | Role | Tenure |
|---|---|---|
| Matt Bowen | Finance Editor | 2023–present |
| Shaun White | Consumer correspondent | 2016–present |
| Mark Riley | Political editor | 2004–present |
| Tim Lester | Political reporter | 2025–present |
| Mylee Hogan; Rob Scott | US correspondents | 2023–present 2025–present |
| Ben Downie; Isabelle Mullen | Europe correspondents | 2024–present 2026–present |
| Tony Auden | Meteorologist | 2016–present |
| Steve Hargrave | Entertainment | 2012–present |
| Ginni Mansberg | GP | 2012–present |

== Former hosts ==
| Presenter | Role | Tenure |
|---|---|---|
| Melissa Doyle | Co-host | 1997–1999; 2002–2013 |
| David Koch | Co-host | 1997–1999; 2002–2023 |
| Georgie Gardner | Co-host | 2000–2002 |
| Mark Beretta | Co-host | 2000–2001 |
| Chris Reason | Co-host | 2002 |
| Samantha Armytage | Co-host | 2013–2021 |
| Natalie Barr | News | 2002–2021 |
| Mark Beretta | Sport | 2004–2025 |
| Nuala Hafner | Entertainment | 2009 |
| Fifi Box | Entertainment | 2010–2012 |
| Edwina Bartholomew | Entertainment | 2016–2021 |
| Monique Wright | Weather | 2006–2007 |
| David Brown | Weather | 2008 |
| Fifi Box | Weather | 2009 |
| Grant Denyer | Weather | 2004–2006; 2010–2013 |
| Edwina Bartholomew | Weather | 2013–2016 |

Prior to the 2002 relaunch of the program there were various presenters and hosts. Hosts included, Georgie Gardner & Mark Beretta (2000–2001), Andrew Daddo & Joh Griggs (Olympic Sunrise), Melissa Doyle & Nick McArdle (1998–1999), Melissa Doyle & David Koch (1997), Chris Bath & David Koch (1996), Chris Bath & Peter Ford (1996) and Darren McDonald who hosted the original program in 1991.

Chris Reason was the original co-host with Melissa Doyle for the 2002 relaunch, while Monique Wright, David Brown and Fifi Box were previous weather presenters. Brown resigned from his role in July 2008, with no replacement until 2009, during which various presenters filled in, being Fifi Box. On 24 January 2010 it was announced that the original presenter Grant Denyer would return to the weather and Fifi Box would move to entertainment replacing Nuala Hafner. In March 2013, Denyer resigned as weather presenter for the second time to spend more time with his family.

In June 2013, Doyle announced that she was moving to a network prime-time role with the Seven Network and would be leaving Sunrise after 14 years. Samantha Armytage was to be her immediate replacement. This came not long after Denyer resigned as weather presenter, with his replacement being former Sydney correspondent Edwina Bartholomew. Doyle's final regular appearance as host on Sunrise aired on 9 August 2013.

In January 2016, Edwina Bartholomew announced that she would be leaving her role as weather presenter to join David Koch, Samantha Armytage, Natalie Barr and Mark Beretta at the desk.

In June 2020, Bartholomew would become news presenter on Mondays and Fridays, replacing Natalie Barr who co-hosts on those days respectively. However this would be short lived, with Barr returning to full time duties as news presenter in September 2020.

In March 2021, Samantha Armytage announced that she would be resigning as co-host, to spend more time with her family. Her final show was on 11 March 2021. Natalie Barr was announced as her replacement, with Edwina Bartholomew stepping into Barr's position of news presenter.

On 29 May 2023, David Koch announced his departure from Sunrise, ending a 21-year run on the Seven breakfast show. Matt Shirvington was announced as his replacement on 5 June 2023. Koch's last show was on 9 June 2023.

On 27 November 2025, Mark Beretta announced his resignation from Sunrise after 22 years, with his final appearance on 12 December.

== Controversies ==
In 2003, an interview aired live with Sue Butler from the Macquarie Dictionary on the topic of swearing and what was acceptable, during which Butler used the term "fuckwit" as an example of what was not acceptable. Doyle and Koch immediately ended the interview and apologised afterwards, though many complaints were still received.

In 2006, David Koch read the joke of the day, which involved then Prime Minister John Howard, his wife Janette, Kim Beazley, and "a message written in urine in the snow". Koch anticipated thousands of complaints even before he made the joke. There was an "extreme backlash" from the public, resulting in Channel Seven owner Kerry Stokes forcing Koch to write a letter of apology to Howard. Howard has not forgiven Koch for the joke and as of 2014 still refuses to appear on Sunrise.

Also in 2006, a number of people including Sunrise presenters David Koch and Melissa Doyle, news presenter Natalie Barr, executive producer Adam Boland and Melbourne news presenter Jennifer Keyte and former Today Tonight host Naomi Robson faced court convictions over a story run in 2004 relating to a 14-year-old boy who "divorced" his mother. Under the Victorian Children and Young Persons Act, publishing the identity of a child involved in Children's Court proceedings is prohibited. While the Sunrise cast and crew were cleared of any wrongdoing, the Seven Network itself was ultimately held responsible.

Later in 2006, upon the rescue of trapped miners Brant Webb and Todd Russell in the aftermath of the Beaconsfield mine collapse, David Koch was invited into an ambulance. This led to rival the Nine Network and Today calling him an "ambulance chaser".

In April 2007, reports surfaced that the show was lobbying Vietnamese authorities to hold an ANZAC Day dawn service early so it could be broadcast live on television in Australia. Koch denied on-air that any such lobbying had occurred. His claim was proven false upon the release of email communications from the office of then opposition leader Kevin Rudd. After considerable political fallout over the alleged request, opposition leader Kevin Rudd and Liberal minister Joe Hockey decided to end their regular weekly appearances on the program.

In a March 2008 episode Koch and Doyle were ambushed by a group of protesters chanting and carrying placards that claimed "Channel 7 doesn't pay", a reference to controversy surrounding the reported non-payment of winnings to National Bingo Night audience members and home viewers. The group, posing as fans of guest Keith Urban, were moved away by security. Koch later blamed the incident on the Nine Network's A Current Affair, a theory that was lent credence when the same protesters appeared on that night's episode of the program. Both Koch and co-host Melissa Doyle promised to look into their allegations but later simply read a statement from the network.

In August 2009, the show was criticised for insinuating that the killers of James Bulger had been secretly resettled in Australia while promoting an episode of Seven's crime drama City Homicide that referenced the case.

In April 2010, a scheduled concert for Canadian teen singer Justin Bieber, at Circular Quay, Sydney, was cancelled at 5:00 am by order of police after the crowd of more than 5,000 people (mainly teenage girls) had begun a crowd crush and were ignoring the orders of the crowd controllers. Eight people were taken to hospital for their injuries and others suffered from hyperventilation. The concert was then moved to the Sunrise studios at Martin Place. Sunrise had been promoting the concert for two weeks beforehand, creating a significant amount of excitement and anticipation. It was also alleged that Bieber swore at a floor manager but was reassured by Bieber's regular sound technician that "he tells us that all the time". Bieber, however, has denied this, publicly denouncing the claims as "lies and rumors" spread by "adults".

In March 2015, Armytage was accused of racism in an on-air interview on the programme, after congratulating a woman for looking whiter than her twin. After an online petition was signed by over 2,000 people calling for her to apologise, she did so.

In February 2016, actress Kristin Davis appeared on the show to discuss her work with the United Nations High Commissioner for Refugees in which she also reluctantly took part in a Sex and The City themed skit which was received poorly by viewers. On Twitter Davis expressed her annoyance that Sunrise focused on her role in Sex and The City instead of her work with the UNHCR, and the incident led to Armytage, who was meant to MC and conduct an interview with Davis at a UNHCR event in Sydney, being disinvited to the event.

In April 2024, following the Bondi Junction stabbings, a 20-year-old Sydney university student was incorrectly identified as the attacker during a live cross with Sunrise presenters; the student's identity and misinformation falsely linking him to the attack had been circulated online and was reported by the programme without verification. Seven subsequently issued an apology for the error after police announced that a 40-year-old Queensland man was responsible for the attack, and later launched in internal investigation into the incident. In response, the student falsely accused of being the attacker sought legal representation for defamation action against Channel 7. The defamation case was settled later in the month, with Seven acknowledging their error was "a grave mistake".

=== Aboriginal adoption controversy ===
On 13 March 2018, Armytage hosted a segment on Sunrise focusing on Aboriginal adoption, during which she incorrectly stated that Aboriginal children could not be fostered by white people and stated that "Post-Stolen Generation, there's been a huge move to leave Aboriginal children where they are, even if they're being neglected in their own families"; in addition, guest Prue MacSween said that most of the Stolen Generation were taken for their own well-being and suggested "we need to do it again, perhaps". The segment was widely criticised for these remarks, as well as for only including white people on the discussion panel and for not seeking any input from any Aboriginal people or experts on the subject.

Consequently, protests were held outside the Sunrise studio in Martin Place in response to the segment on 15 March, which lead to further outrage when the programme chose to obscure the protest from viewers watching the live broadcast, citing a possible breach in broadcast standards. In response to the controversy, the following week Koch presented a discussion on the issue with a panel of Indigenous experts. Despite this, protests continued during the show's live broadcasts at the 2018 Commonwealth Games on the Gold Coast in April, while in May rock band Portugal. The Man pulled out of an appearance on the show citing the recent statements aired on Sunrise. The segment later came under the investigation of the Australian Communications and Media Authority for potential breach of the Commercial Television Industry Code of Practice; in September 2018 the ACMA concluded that the segment was in breach of the code, as it contained inaccurate statements and "strong negative generalisations about Indigenous people as a group".

The segment also used file footage of members of the Yirrkala community, who sued Seven for defamation, breach of privacy and confidence, racial discrimination and breach of Australian consumer law in April 2019. The footage was originally filmed for a health promotion in Yirrkala, but was reused with only slight blurring for the segment. In December 2019 Seven settled the matter out of court, and offered an unreserved apology to the community which was also broadcast on the program the following month. In June 2020, Armytage and MacSween were sued for racial vilification over the segment. Since the segment, MacSween has not been invited to appear again on the program.

Seven aired a general apology for airing the segment on the program on 4 January 2021. A number of commentators criticised the apology, with some questioning its sincerity while others noted the length of time between the airing of the original segment and the apology, as well as the fact that Seven aired it early in the morning (at 6:45am) and during the summer when less viewers would be watching the programme than usual. In April 2022, former Sunrise executive producer Michael Pell admitted that in retrospect the execution of the segment, including the choice of MacSween as guest and the limited time devoted to discussing the sensitive topic, was "regrettable" and "one of the biggest downsides" of his 11-year tenure with the program.

== Special editions ==
Occasionally, in the event of major breaking news, Sunrise may run overtime to cover the story, resulting in The Morning Show either airing later or not airing at all.

During 2008's World Youth Day in Sydney, Sunrise was extended on Thursday, 17 July and Monday, 21 July to cover the Pope's morning Masses and the departure of the Pope respectively. Both of those editions ended at 9:30 am with The Morning Show picking up the rest of the coverage.

Sunrise was extended on 13 October 2010 to cover the 2010 Copiapó mining accident, on 27 February 2012 to cover the Labor leadership ballot, and on 30 October 2012 to cover Hurricane Sandy.

On 22 January 2013, Sunrise commenced at 3:00 am and concluded at 10:00 am to cover the inauguration of Barack Obama. Normal early morning programming did not air. On 29 January, Sunrise was extended to 11:00 am to cover flooding in southern Queensland and northern New South Wales.

Following the birth of Prince George, Melissa Doyle fronted an extended edition of the program for two days, live from outside Buckingham Palace. David Koch and Samantha Armytage also appeared in a reduced role back in the studio. The extended version began at 5:00 am, replacing Sunrise Extra and the Early News, with Doyle also contributing reports to The Morning Show which began at its regular time of 9:00 am.

On 9 August 2013 a special Sunrise edition of This Is Your Life aired throughout the program to farewell the outgoing Sunrise host Melissa Doyle. Throughout the program special guests including Dannii Minogue, Joe Hockey and then Prime Minister of Australia Kevin Rudd made a video message to farewell Mel. Seven West Media CEO Tim Worner and Kerry Stokes appeared paying tribute. Throughout the show the hashtag #farewellmel trended on Twitter.

On 28 March 2017, Sunrise was extended to 1.00pm to cover Cyclone Debbie.

On 9 September 2022, after the announcement of the death of Her Majesty Queen Elizabeth II, an extended edition of Sunrise aired from 5:00am until 12 noon, with David Koch and Natalie Barr providing wall-to-wall coverage. All on-air talent wore black, in line with royal protocol for national mourning, up to and including the late Queen's funeral on 19 September 2022.

On 9 June 2023, Sunrise devoted the morning’s broadcast to farewelling David Koch after 21 years on the show. Colleagues including Natalie Barr, Edwina Bartholomew and Mark Beretta shared tributes, and Kochie’s family joined him on set for his final show. Seven West Media chairman Kerry Stokes and CEO James Warburton also appeared to acknowledge his impact on the network and Australian breakfast TV.

On Monday 15 December 2025, after the Bondi terror attack at a Jewish Chanukah festival, Sunrise had rolling coverage in an extended edition which ran until midday with Natalie Barr reporting from the scene at Bondi Beach.

== Logos ==
2002–2004

2004–2007

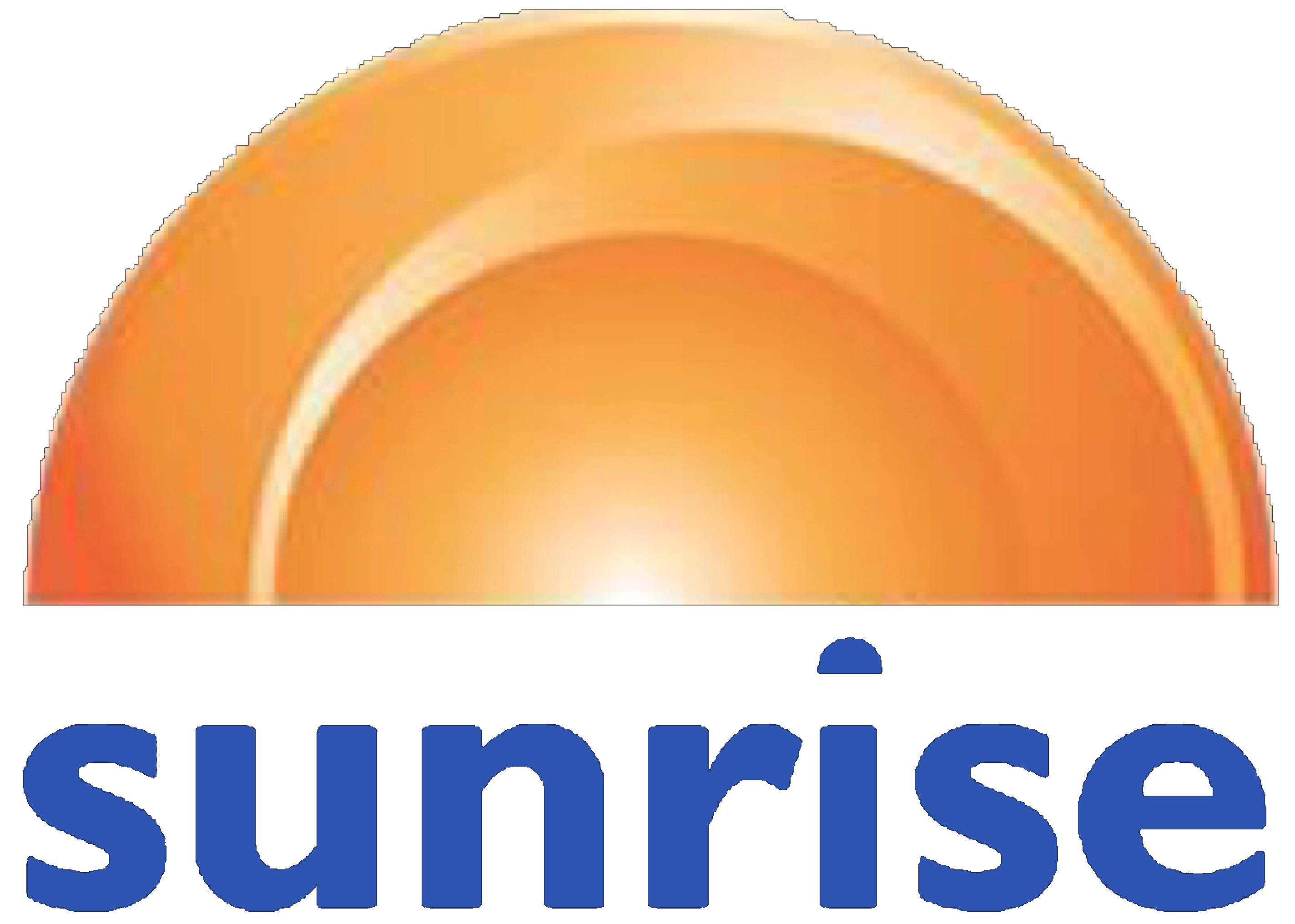
2007–2010

2010–2016

2016–2021

2021–2023

2023–present

== Ratings ==
Sunrise and its Nine Network rival Today remain close in the ratings, with the gap between the two often being less than 50,000 viewers in Sunrise's favour.

On Good Friday 2009, Sunrise suffered its first one-day ratings defeat nationally against Today since 2004. In 2011, Sunrise suffered its first weekly ratings defeat against Today since the same year. In 2016, after twelve straight years of ratings dominance, Sunrise dropped to second place behind Today, but reclaimed the lead in the breakfast battle the following year.

News Breakfast has outrated Sunrise twice since its debut in November 2008, the latest on 23 May 2022 in the aftermath of the 2022 Australian federal election.

== Broadcasting ==
Because Australia has more than one time zone, Sunrise is not broadcast live to all of Australia, it is instead broadcast delayed. Australian Capital Territory, New South Wales, Tasmania, and Victoria have Sunrise broadcast live all year round, and Queensland has Sunrise broadcast live in wintertime, but during Daylight Saving Time in Sydney has the program delayed by one hour. The Northern Territory has Sunrise delayed 30 minutes during winter and 90 minutes during Daylight Savings in Sydney. South Australia has it delayed by 30 minutes all year around and Western Australia has it delayed by two hours in wintertime and by three hours during Daylight Savings in Sydney.

Occasionally, broadcasts of Sunrise are altered during special circumstances. On the morning of 20 March 2006, when Sunrise was normally on a one-hour delay in Queensland, the program was broadcast live in order to provide immediate and up-to-date information on Tropical Cyclone Larry to local residents. The show continued to be broadcast until 10am Sydney time only in to Queensland to continue these updates and prevent scheduling problems.

On most public holidays, Sunrise is extended to 10 am, thus adding an additional hour to its telecast, and has at times had a studio audience for these special events.

== Theme song ==
Sunrise used Duran Duran's "(Reach Up for The) Sunrise" as its theme song until 2010 when MGMT's "Electric Feel" replaced it. In October 2011, "(Reach Up for The) Sunrise" was reinstated as the theme song. As of the 2007 refresh of the show, the show uses a combination of the Ferry Corsten and Jason Nevins' remixes for its opening sequence.

Formerly, it had used a more traditional morning news theme before switching to the song. In the past it has also used the Seven News theme which was based on the John Williams piece "The Mission".

== See also ==
- List of longest-running Australian television series
- Journalism in Australia
- List of Australian television series
