= Jim Wilson (broadcaster) =

Australian sports journalist, reporter and radio presenter

- Born: 29 December 1967 (age 58); Southport, Queensland, Australia
- Occupations: sports reporter; journalist; radio presenter
- Years active: 1992−present
- Spouse: Chris Bath (m. 2012)

Jim Wilson (born 29 December 1967 in Southport, Queensland) is an Australian sports journalist, reporter and radio presenter.

Wilson has previously had a 28 year career at the Seven Network as a sport presenter, reporter and sports editor for Seven News initially starting in the Melbourne newsroom before moving to Sydney. Prior to joining the Seven Network he was a sport reporter at the Nine Network in Brisbane.

== Career ==
Wilson made Australian television history in August 2012 when he replaced Tony Squires as sports presenter on Seven News Sydney. This was the first time a married couple has anchored an Australian news bulletin as Wilson is married to Seven News presenter Chris Bath.

In August 2013, Jim was appointed sport presenter on a revamped Seven Afternoon News. Since February 2017, Wilson has also presented the sport on the Tuesday to Friday editions of Seven Morning News.

Wilson was also a reporter for the Seven Network during the 2012 London Olympics, appearing on various Seven Network news bulletins and programs. This was also the sixth time Jim had covered the Olympics, either as a reporter or as a commentator.

Wilson anchored the panel for Seven's coverage of Liverpool and Tottenham Hotspurs' friendly matches against Melbourne Victory and Sydney FC respectively in 2013 and 2015. He is a Western Sydney Wanderers fan, and was an official ambassador for the 2015 AFC Asian Cup, which was hosted by Australia.

In March 2016, it was announced that Wilson would lead Seven's sport team and continue to present sport on Seven News on Fridays and Saturdays, making way for new recruit Mel McLaughlin.

Wilson was the lead anchor of Seven's coverage of the 2017 Rugby League World Cup.

In 2018, it was announced that Wilson will host Seven's coverage of the Big Bash League and Women's Big Bash League.

In June 2020, Wilson announced his resignation from the Seven Network, leaving the network after 28 years to join 2GB as Drive presenter replacing Ben Fordham. Jim finished with the Seven Network on 27 June. In November 2022, Wilson announced that he will host his last 2GB Drive radio show on 10 November 2022. It was later announced that Nine News reporter Chris O'Keefe will replace Wilson. In February 2023, it was announced that Wilson had parted ways with the Nine Network.

== Personal life ==
In late 2008, Wilson separated from his first wife Jackie, with whom he had two sons. In December 2008 Wilson started dating journalist, radio and television personality Chris Bath.

In 2009, Wilson's younger son was diagnosed at age 5 with an aggressive brain cancer; he died 8 months later in April 2010.

On 12 January 2012 Wilson and Bath were married at a private family gathering in the Hunter Valley after dating for three years.

Wilson's older sister Rebecca Wilson, also a sports journalist, died on 7 October 2016 from breast cancer.
