= 2024 in Australian television =

This is a list of Australian television-related events, debuts, finales, and cancellations that were scheduled to occur in 2024, the 69th year of continuous operation of television in Australia.

== Events ==
=== January ===
Date	Event	Source
1	The ABC's coverage of the annual midnight Sydney New Year's Eve fireworks is watched by 1,140,000 viewers.	
5	Seven News cameraman Paul Walker celebrates his forty-year anniversary with the network, in the ATN Sydney newsroom.	
8	WIN News presenter Jared Constable begins his role as the network's sport presenter.	
14	Alicia Loxley and Tom Steinfort present their first weeknight Nine News Melbourne bulletin from the Melbourne Park for the 2024 Australian Open. On the same day, the Nine News Sydney and Melbourne news bulletins refresh its on-air graphics.	
14	It is announced that Colin Fassnidge would be joining Better Homes and Gardens beginning 2 February 2024, replacing Ed Halmagyi. He continues to host My Kitchen Rules.	
14	The second series of the ABC TV series Muster Dogs premieres, which is again narrated by Lisa Millar.	
17	CNN International Asia Pacific returns to Fetch TV, as part of a contract extension deal with Warner Bros. Discovery. On the same day, as part of a deal with Paramount Global, MTV 90s, MTV 00s and MTV 80s launch on Fetch TV.	
19	Tracy Grimshaw's new television series is revealed at a Nine Entertainment event in Melbourne, to be titled Do You Want to Live Forever? and featuring Dr Nick Coatsworth. At the event, it is also announced that Nine News reporters Dimity Clancey and Adam Hegarty will join 60 Minutes on 4 February 2024, when the show returns.	
19	The 2024 Winter Youth Olympics opening ceremony from Gangwon airs on 9Go!, beginning Nine's Olympic and Paralympic Games coverage.	
22	Sky News Australia launches a new streaming app, costing AU$5 per month.	
24	Andrew O'Keefe, the former host of Deal or No Deal, The Chase Australia and Weekend Sunrise, is found guilty of common assault, common assault occasioning actual bodily harm, breaching an AVO and drug possession after assaulting his former partner during an argument in 2021.	
24	7plus joins Foxtel, on the iQ4 and iQ5 Foxtel boxes, hence Foxtel has all free-to-air streaming apps. The Foxtel iQ3 will add 7plus at a later date.	
24	Seven News announces that Samantha Heathwood would replace Katrina Blowers as the Brisbane weekend news presenter from 3 February. Blowers shares presenting duties on Seven Afternoon News with Heathwood and is a reporter.	
28	The 2024 Australian Open men's final between Daniil Medvedev and Jannik Sinner reaches 4,767,000 viewers, as a result of changes to the OzTAM rating system.	
29	The Chase Australia launches its double chaser format, named Double Trouble.	
29	The first edition of 10 News First: Afternoon goes to air on Network 10. The show is presented by Narelda Jacobs.	
29	The Australian version of Tipping Point, hosted by Todd Woodbridge, debuts on the Nine Network.	
29	Deal or No Deal is revived by Network 10, hosted by Grant Denyer.	
29	The ninth season of Australian Idol debuts on the Seven Network.	
29	Australian Survivor: Titans V Rebels hosted by Jonathan LaPaglia debuts on Network 10.	
29	The eleventh season of Married at First Sight debuts on the Nine Network.	
29	Nine News Melbourne airs a photoshopped image of Victorian state MP Georgie Purcell which appears to enlarge her breasts and expose her midriff. After Purcell accuses Nine of sexism, they issued an apology blaming automation from Photoshop during resizing.	

=== February ===
Date	Event	Source
2	A collaboration between BBC Studios/Ludo Studio and Australian hardware chain Bunnings is officially launched, which sees six Bunnings stores temporarily rebranded to "Hammerbarn", in homage to a 2020 Bluey episode of the same name.	
2	Better Homes and Gardens returns to the Seven Network for its thirtieth season.	
4	Insiders returns to ABC TV. The first guest for 2024 is Australian prime minister Anthony Albanese.	
8	Seven West Media announces that The Latest: Seven News will move production to Seven's Perth headquarters in March, resulting in Michael Usher departing from the program.	
10	Sky News Australia announces that The Rita Panahi Show is expanding from Fridays to Monday–Thursday, following the moving of Piers Morgan Uncensored to YouTube.	
16	The Australian Broadcasting Corporation's ombudsman clears Indigenous Affairs editor Bridget Brennan of breaching impartiality standards during a live cross to News Breakfast on Australia Day in which she used the phrase "always was and always will be Aboriginal land", which prompted 25 complaints.	
18	Former Totally Wild and Studio 10 reporter and Gamify host Jesse Baird and his partner Luke Davies disappear. A 28-year-old New South Wales police officer, who Baird previously dated, is subsequently charged with their murders.	
19	An episode of ABC TV's Four Corners attracts attention after Woolworths Group CEO Brad Banducci attempts to have comments he made about former Australian Competition & Consumer Commission chair Rod Sims edited out, before momentarily walking away when Angus Grigg, an ABC reporter, refused.	
20	It is announced that the Nine Network signed a 5 year deal worth up to $50 million, with the Victoria Racing Club and Tabcorp, in order for Nine to broadcast the Melbourne Cup until 2029.	
21	Foxtel announces its new $99 set top box Hubbl. The set-top-box integrates both free-to-air and pay television services.	
26	The first episode of The Chase Australia featuring new chaser Brandon Blackwell, nicknamed "The Lightning Bolt", airs at 5:00 pm on Channel 7.	
29	Kayo Sports starts to provide 4K content. The Kayo Basic plan increases its price from AU$30 to AU$35.	

=== March ===
Date	Event	Source
1	Foxtel announces that its set-top-box Hubbl will be on sale and be advertised from 10 March 2024. Its Hubbl Glass TV will cost AU$1595 and will feature hands-free voice control and six speakers with Dolby Atmos surround sound.	
2	The Seven Network announces Simon Cohen, Rosie Morley and Lana Taylor as the judges on its upcoming home renovation reality program Dream Home, hosted by Chris Brown.	
4	Network 10 airs the 9,000th episode of Neighbours.	
5	Seven West Media confirms that The Latest: Seven News will begin broadcasting from Perth on 18 March 2024, with Tim McMillan presenting, replacing Michael Usher and Angela Cox. To make room for the changes, the program will not air from 11–14 March 2024.	
8	Network 10 reboots Ready Steady Cook as a weekly Friday evening series, hosted by chef Miguel Maestre.	
14	Warren Tredrea, former sports presenter at Nine News, loses an unfair dismissal complaint against the news service. Tredrea claimed he had been dismissed in January 2022 due to his refusal to adhere to the Nine Network's COVID-19 vaccination policy, requiring all employees to be fully-vaccinated. However, the Federal Court accepted the network's assertions that Tredrea was dismissed due to his performance within his role.	
15	After thirteen years, Darren Wick departs his role as Director of News and Current Affairs at Nine News.	
15	It is announced that the Nine Network has delivered its best-ever rating results for the first quarter of 2024.	
19	HR manager Feras Basal wins Australian Survivor: Titans V Rebels, becoming the first Arab Australian to win the reality series.	
22	Brooke Boney announces her departure from Today and the Nine Network in order to study at the University of Oxford. She will leave the network soon after the 2024 Summer Olympics.	
22	Seven Early News presenter Jodie Speers announces her departure from the Seven Network after fifteen years. She is succeeded by Edwina Bartholomew.	
24	The tenth season of I'm a Celebrity...Get Me Out of Here! premieres on Network 10. This season is hosted by Julia Morris and new co-host Robert Irwin.	
24	Australian Idol judge Marcia Hines is taken to hospital after collapsing in her dressing room prior to the show going to air.	
25	The finale of the ninth season of Australian Idol airs on the Seven Network, which is won by Dylan Wright who beats out Amy Reeves and Denvah Baker-Moller.	
27	It is announced that coverage of the 2024 international cricket season will be available for the first time on 7plus, in addition to being broadcast on the Seven Network.	
27	Due to the passing of the Broadcasting Services Amendment (Community Television) Bill 2024, it is announced that Channel 44 and C31 Melbourne and Geelong will continue to operate for the foreseeable future.	
30	Seven News Queensland presenter Rosanna Natoli announces that she will resign from the network, having won the election to become the new Mayor of the Sunshine Coast.	

=== April ===
Date	Event	Source
2	Pizza creator Paul Fenech responds to accusations of fatphobia by Rebel Wilson, who recalls her time playing the character of Toula in her new memoir. Fenech describes Wilson's claims as "hurtful" and "disgusting", while describing her as "ungrateful".	
5	Emma Watkins is announced as the new host of the third season of ABC Me's Teenage Boss, named Teenage Boss: Next Level, succeeding mathematician and teacher Eddie Woo.	
8	The first episode of The Chase Australia featuring new chaser David Poltorak, nicknamed "The Professor", airs at 5:00 pm on the Seven Network.	
8	A spokesperson at Seven West Media confirms that longtime Sunrise executive producer Michael Pell has departed the company.	
9	Virginia Trioli returns to TV, with the debut of Creative Types with Virginia Trioli on ABC TV.	
12	Chris Uhlmann announces that he has joined Sky News Australia as a political contributor, having previously worked at the Australian Broadcasting Corporation and the Nine Network. He will be a regular contributor to the Credlin program, every Tuesday night.	
14	A special 28-minute long episode of Bluey, titled "The Sign", airs on ABC Kids at 8:00 am.	
15	Bruce Lehrmann loses the civil defamation case he brought against Network 10 and Lisa Wilkinson in the Federal Court, with Justice Michael Lee finding on the balance of probabilities that Lehrmann raped Brittany Higgins at Parliament House in 2019.	
18	Seven West Media CEO James Warburton departs the company and the Seven Network.	
19	Neighbours is nominated for Best Daytime Drama Series at the 51st Daytime Emmy Awards. Guy Pearce is also nominated for Best Guest Performance in a Daytime Drama Series for his portrayal of Mike Young.	
20	Hosted by Stephen Fry and filmed in London, the first episode of the reboot of Jeopardy! Australia airs on the Nine Network.	
21	Social media influencer Skye Wheatley wins the tenth season of I'm a Celebrity...Get Me Out of Here! on Network 10. Dancer and Studio 10 presenter Tristan MacManus is runner-up.	
22	The sixteenth season of MasterChef Australia premieres on Network 10, with new judges Sofia Levin, Jean-Christophe Novelli and Poh Ling Yeow joining returning judge Andy Allen for the new season.	
24	Sophie Hood and Troy Benjamin win the first season of Gordon Ramsay's Food Stars on the Nine Network, with a $250,000 cash prize.	
26	A Sydney university student reaches a confidential settlement with the Seven Network after he was wrongly named as the Bondi Junction stabbing attacker by presenter Matt Shirvington on Weekend Sunrise the morning after the attacks.	
29	The life's work of Mr. Squiggle creator Norman Hetherington is entrusted to the National Museum of Australia.	
29	Craig McPherson departs Seven News and therefore Seven West Media. As a result, Anthony De Ceglie is appointed as the director of Seven News, starting the following day on 30 April 2024.	

=== May ===
Date	Event	Source
1	SCA Seven in Tasmania is issued with a breach notice by the Australian Communications & Media Authority after a viewer complained about poor closed captioning for the hearing impaired during and while watching the 9 November 2023 edition of Nightly News 7 Tasmania.	
7	Network 10 confirms that The Masked Singer Australia and The Bachelor Australia will not return in 2024.	
7	Team USA (Krystle and Michelle) win Lego Masters Australia vs The World on the Nine Network, becoming the first female team to win a Lego Masters competition worldwide, taking home AU$100,000.	
10	Network 10 announces the celebrity contestants who will make up the cast for the next season of The Amazing Race Australia: Celebrity Edition. The cast includes Tai Tuivasa, Billy Brownless, Peter Helliar, Brooke McClymont, Adam Eckersley, Ian Thorpe, Chloe Logarzo, Emily Gielnik, Natalie Bassingthwaighte, Jett Kenny, Havana Brown and Luke McGregor.	
12	The Nine Network unveils their new Canberra studios at Parliament House, during Weekend Today.	
19	It is revealed that the Nine Network's veteran news director Darren Wick left the company in March 2024 after a complaint was made by a female staff member alleging inappropriate behaviour. This prompts other women to come forward and make further claims about Wick's alleged behaviour. Nine Entertainment subsequently acknowledges the claims of Wick's alleged inappropriate behaviour. The company sends a letter to all employees admitting the trauma some staff had experienced and informs them an external review will be undertaken of the television news and current affairs division, with staff also asked to complete refreshed sexual harassment prevention training by the end of June.	
21	Australian comedian Marty Fields confirms his family is considering the phrasing on a plaque in Melbourne honouring his late parents, television personalities Maurie Fields and Val Jellay, after being vandalised for the second time in a year. Fields believes the vandal finds the term "The King and Queen of Vaudeville" egregious due to its royalty references.	
23	Network 10 begins airing the second season of Taskmaster Australia, which was the third season to be filmed. The now-third season will be aired after the completion of the second.	
23	Nine Entertainment appoints Fiona Dear as Director of News and Current Affairs for Nine News, following the resignation of Darren Wick in March.	
26	Chief political correspondent for ABC TV's 7.30 program Laura Tingle uses a forum at the Sydney Writers' Festival to describe Australia as "a racist country" and openly criticises federal opposition leader Peter Dutton's budget reply speech, where he outlined his party's migration policy. Her comments prompt widespread commentary. The ABC denies reports the ABC Board are in emergency talks regarding Tingle's comments.	
27	10 News First newsreader Sandra Sully receives her Order of Australia medal, having been awarded in January.	
29	ABC News director Justin Stevens confirms 7.30's chief political correspondent Laura Tingle had been counselled over remarks she made at the Sydney Writers Festival on 26 May, stating the comments would not meet the ABC's editorial standards and that her comments "lacked the context, balance and supporting information of her work for the ABC".	
29	Aquacultralist Krzysztof Wojtkowski wins the second season of Alone Australia, after surviving 64 days.	

=== June ===
Date	Event	Source
1	Network 10 begins airing Ready Steady Cook in a new 6:30 pm time slot on Saturday evenings.	
2	ABC Television's digital multi-channels ABC TV Plus and ABC Me broadcast programming for the final time, prior to the channels being rebranded with new programming from 3 June.	
3	The Australian Broadcasting Corporation's multi-channels ABC TV Plus and ABC Me rebrand as ABC Family and ABC Entertains respectively, after being announced on 9 May. ABC Family focuses on family-friendly programming airing from 7:30 pm each night after ABC Kids closes down for the night, while ABC Entertains focuses on comedy and entertainment programming, with children's programming in the daytime. The rebrand also includes four new digital ABC iview programming live streams.	
4	It is announced that Mildura Digital Television is to hand back its licence to the Australian Communications and Media Authority, as part of its closure on 30 June.	
5	Nurse Charlotte wins the second season of The Summit on the Nine Network, taking home a $336,000 prize.	
6	Nine Entertainment chairman Peter Costello is accused by The Australian journalist Liam Mendes of shoving him at Canberra Airport. Costello denies the allegation and says Mendes simply fell over after walking backwards into an advertising placard.	
7	The Seven Network launches an internal investigation into allegations of inappropriate behaviour by senior journalist Robert Ovadia. Ovadia denies the allegations, describing them as "false" and "malicious".	
7	Neighbours is defeated by General Hospital for the Daytime Emmy Award for Outstanding Drama Series at the 51st Daytime Emmy Awards, while Guy Pearce is defeated by Dick Van Dyke for the Daytime Emmy Award for Outstanding Guest Performer in a Drama Series.	
7	Anthony Albanese opens Nine Entertainment's new Parliament House news bureau for Nine News in Canberra.	
9	Peter Costello resigns from the Nine Entertainment board as chairman, effective immediately, after allegedly assaulting The Australian journalist Liam Mendes at Canberra Airport on 6 June.	
10	Seven News launches a new, free smartphone app.	
12	Fetch TV announces that Scott Lorson is departing the company after 15 years as CEO, to be replaced by Dominic Arena from 1 July 2024.	
12	Libbie Doherty, the head of children's and family content at the Australian Broadcasting Corporation steps down, after nine years working at the ABC.	
13	Paul Higgins presents his final weather report for ABC News Victoria, after a 38 year career on Australian television which began in 1986 as the host of ABC TV's Behind the News, which he hosted for 8 years.	
13	Paul Barry announces he will depart the Australian Broadcasting Corporation's Media Watch program in December, after 11 years hosting the program.	
14	Seven News appoints presenter and reporter Gemma Acton as Director of News Operations.	
15	Nine News presenter and reporter Jo Hall is congratulated for reaching her 45th anniversary with the Nine Network.	
15	Network 10 begins airing Ready Steady Cook in a new 4:00 pm time slot on Saturday afternoons.	
16	Mark Humphries is reportedly announced as a host for a new segment on Seven News Sydney.	
17	Sunrise on the Seven Network revives the iconic Cash Cow mascot.	
17	SBS World News is named the most trusted news brand in Australia by the University of Canberra and the Reuters Institute for the Study of Journalism.	
17	Sky News Australia journalist Cheng Lei is blocked by Chinese officials, while Li Qiang visits Parliament House.	
17	Amy McCarthy is appointed as the executive producer of A Current Affair, succeeding Fiona Dear.	
20	Seven West Media announces Neil Warren's departure from director of news at Seven's Sydney station, ATN. He is to be replaced by Sean Power, the executive producer of Sunrise.	
20	Former The Chase Australia and Weekend Sunrise host Andrew O'Keefe is reportedly charged with a driving offence. He will face the Downing Centre Local Court on 6 August.	
21	Nine News Melbourne cameraman Trigby Chvastek retires from Nine's Melbourne station GTV after 36 years.	
21	Robert Ovadia confirms that he has been sacked from the Seven Network.	
23	The seven Gold Logie nominees for 2024 are announced as Tony Armstrong, Larry Emdur, Robert Irwin, Asher Keddie, Sonia Kruger, Andy Lee and Julia Morris.	
25	Seven West Media announces 150 job cuts, including three executives: Kurt Burnette, Melissa Hopkins and Lewis Martin, as a part of an executive restructuring announced the following day by CEO Jeff Howard, saving $100,000,000 in costs. Gold Coast weather presenter Paul Burt and Brisbane news operation manager Craig Dyer were among the cuts.	
25	Madman Entertainment's DocPlay app is added to Foxtel iQ set-top-boxes, ahead of the DocPlay channel launching on 3 September 2024.	
27	After 29 years playing the character Toadie Rebecchi, Ryan Moloney announces he is leaving Neighbours, to pursue directing ambitions.	
27	Georgie Nichols resigns from the Seven Network, as the national sales director. She will leave Seven in August.	
27	Memo Hayek is removed from her role as chief information and technology officer at Nine Entertainment. Hayek's role is made redundant.	
28	Nine Entertainment announces 200 job cuts, saving more than $30,000,000 in costs. This includes its European correspondent Carrie-Anne Greenbank and medical reporter Emily Rice.	
28	The old studios for BTV6 (now part of WIN Television) in Ballarat, are listed for sale. The studios will be converted into 8 house blocks.	
30	Mildura Digital Television, which carries a Network 10 signal to the regional Victorian city of Mildura and the surrounding Sunraysia region, ceases broadcasting as its parent company (owned by Seven West Media and WIN Corporation) ceases operations due to continued financial losses and unprofitably. After a new bill passes through the federal parliament of Australia, local residents can get access to the Viewer Access Satellite Television at their own cost in order to continue watching Network 10 programming, or residents can use 10's catch up service 10Play.	
30	Sky News Regional ends broadcasts in Griffith, Mount Gambier and the Riverland, following WIN Television's unsuccessful renewal of the affiliation agreement with Sky News Australia.	

=== July ===
Date	Event	Source
1	TVSN moves channels from channel 16 on the Network 10 multiplex (channel 54 or 84 in regional WIN Television areas) to channel 77 on the Seven Network multiplex (channel 67 in Seven regional areas), as part of a broadcast deal with Seven West Media. The channel is expected to livestream on the 7plus platform as part of the deal, beginning mid-July. The channel is now also broadcasting in Southern Cross Austereo areas not covered by Seven West Media, on channels 65 (Tasmania and Spencer Gulf) and 75 (Darwin).	
1	Nine Entertainment confirms its commentary team and channel schedule for the 2024 Summer Olympics and the 2024 Summer Paralympics, both held in Paris and coverage beginning on 21 July 2024. Names include: Sarah Abo, Karl Stefanovic, Leila McKinnon, Dylan Alcott, James Bracey, Gerard Whateley, Allison Langdon, Eddie McGuire, Sylvia Jeffreys, Nick McArdle, Sam McClure, Cate Campbell, Ellie Cole, Roz Kelly, Giaan Rooney, Mark Taylor, Mat Thompson, Ian Thorpe and Todd Woodbridge.	
1	Chris Jones is appointed as director, network sport at Seven West Media, succeeding Lewis Martin. This change resulted in Gary O'Keeffe becoming the head of AFL and sport innovation, Andrew Hore-Lacy becoming the head of horse racing, Kirsty Bradmore becoming the head of sport digital and Joel Starcevic becoming Seven's head of cricket.	
1	NRL 360 presenter Paul Kent is dismissed from his roles at Fox Sports and News Corp, after he allegedly became involved in a fight with a man in a Sydney restaurant on 27 April.	
3	Lisa Millar announces that she is leaving News Breakfast on 23 August to focus on other content at the ABC, including as the host of the shows Back Roads and Muster Dogs, after five years as co-host with Michael Rowland.	
3	Paul Kent pleads guilty and is sentenced to a two-year good behaviour bond by Jennifer Price, following an altercation with a man in a Sydney restaurant on 27 April.	
4	The Federal Parliament passes the Prominence and Anti-siphoning Bill 2024, meaning television manufactures must install apps from Australian free-to-air television networks on new televisions and available on its primary user interface. Streaming platforms like Kayo Sports cannot purchase sports ahead of FTA networks as anti-siphoning has extended to Australian streaming services.	
4	In its five years on air, the SBS game show Mastermind broadcasts its 500th episode,	
7	Former Seven Network journalist Robert Ovadia lodges legal action with Seven, following his firing on 21 June.	
7	The 21st season of Dancing with the Stars debuts on the Seven Network, with new host Chris Brown alongside Sonia Kruger. During the first episode of the season, chef Julie Goodwin is forced to withdraw from dancing in the competition, after she suffered two muscle tears.	
7	During an appearance on Network 10's The Project, former Liberal prime minister Malcolm Turnbull describes current Liberal leader Peter Dutton as a "thug", after also describing Dutton as a "thug" in the 2024 ABC documentary series Nemesis.	
7	It is announced that Mark Humphries's new comedy sketch segment for Seven News, "The 6.57pm News", will debut nationally at 6:57 pm on 12 July 2024.	
9	The grand finale of the first season of Dream Home airs on the Seven Network, with Queensland brothers Rhys and Liam receiving a $100,000 prize.	
10	WIN Television appoints Sophie Kuryl as its Tasmania news director, succeeding Alex Johnston, who is departing on 15 July, and joining the Jacqui Lambie Network as a political advisor.	
12	After seventeen years, veteran Seven News Brisbane presenter Sharyn Ghidella leaves the Seven Network.	
15	The Seven Network debuts a 20-second daily astrology segment by The Morning Show astrologer Natasha Weber, airing after the weather forecast on the 6:00 pm Seven News bulletins.	
15	Network 10 comedy game show Have You Been Paying Attention? celebrates the game show's milestone of 300 episodes since its debut in 2013.	
16	Barista Nat Thaipun wins the 16th season of Network 10's MasterChef Australia, winning a $250,000 prize.	
17	As part of a restructure of its news operations, revealed on 11 July to Seven West Media employees, Seven News' European correspondent Hugh Whitfeld is announced as Seven's new director for its national news desk.	
17	Lincoln Humphries leaves his presenting position at WIN News, following his long-service leave.	
19	Sky News Australia, various Foxtel channels and the ABC's television channels are taken off the air due to the 2024 CrowdStrike incident. The Special Broadcasting Service, the Seven Network, the Nine Network and Network 10, were also unable to broadcast programs on the day of the incident.	
21	It is reported Sky News Australia will relocate to the News Corp Australia headquarters in Surry Hills in 2025. It was reported that the network's licence to use the Sky News brand with Sky plc was expected to expire as early as late-2025, and that Sky was not expected to renew the agreement, due to the change in ownership and the divergence in Sky News UK and Sky News Australia's content. The AFR also reported that News Corp were considering rebranding the network as either "Australian News Channel" or a name containing "Fox News" (derived from its American sister network owned by Fox Corporation) or a name containing "Talk" (derived from News UK brand Talkradio).	
22	Weekend Today co-host and former newsreader Jayne Azzopardi debuts on the weekday Today show as newsreader, after Brooke Boney announces she would be leaving the breakfast show earlier in 2024.	
22	The Australian Broadcasting Corporation announces its ABC News division has refreshed its logo. The corporation announces a new look across its programming and reveals that the ABC News channel will begin broadcasting on 19 August 2024.	
22	Network 10 confirms that The Sunday Project will move time slots to 6:00 pm–7:00 pm from 18 August, as the 5:00 pm Sunday news bulletin moves back to one hour.	
22	Two Australian broadcast technicians in France for the Nine Network's Olympics coverage of the 2024 Summer Olympics are allegedly assaulted in Le Bourget.	
23	Network 10 announces that its 10 News First: Midday bulletin will be moved to a 1:00 pm timeslot and will be rebranded to 10 News First: Lunchtime on 19 August 2024. The network also announces that it will extend its Saturday bulletin to 90 minutes from 17 August 2024.	
24	Nine Entertainment unveils their Paris broadcast studio for the 2024 Summer Olympics.	
24	LG Electronics Australia and Sky News Australia announce that its Free ad-supported streaming television channel, Sky News Now, will join LG's LG Channels FAST service, from that date on channel 105.	
25	It is announced that media agencies will begin trading Virtual Australia (VOZ) data on 29 December 2024.	
27	The Nine Network airs the opening ceremony of the 2024 Summer Olympics, highlighted by a performance of Hymne à l'amour by Celine Dion. The ceremony (including the replay) is watched by an average of 6.8 million viewers.	
27	Ex-ABC news presenter Karina Carvalho is announced to be joining Seven News Melbourne, beginning in the newsroom on 29 July 2024. She begins presenting Seven Afternoon News Melbourne on 5 August 2024, and begins presenting weekend editions alongside Mike Amor from 10 August 2024, while regular presenter Rebecca Maddern is on one month's leave.	
27	Brisbane and Gold Coast weather presenter Paul Burt presents his final weather report for the Seven Network, after being sacked on 25 June.	
28	Former television host Andrew O'Keefe is arrested for driving under drug influence, after being reportedly charged with a driving offence on 20 June, following a stop in Bellevue Hill.	
30	After six years of hosting The World on the ABC News channel, Beverley O'Connor announces that she is leaving the ABC, after fifteen years with the broadcaster.	
31	The live broadcast of Network 10's The Project is interrupted with a repeat of The Dog House Australia due to a fire alarm prompting the evacuation of the crew, studio audience and hosts Waleed Aly, Sarah Harris, Sam Taunton and Nick Cody.	
31	The Special Broadcasting Service's director of media sales, Adam Sadler, announces his resignation from SBS, while Jane Palfreyman will assume temporary leadership of SBS Media.	

=== August ===
Date	Event	Source
1	Network 10 celebrates the 60th anniversary of the network, alongside its Melbourne station ATV.	
4	It is reported that former Sunrise and The Farmer Wants a Wife host Samantha Armytage will leave the Seven Network in October, after twenty-one years with the network.	
4	British singer James Bay is announced to perform at the TV Week Logie Awards of 2024, alongside several presenters who will give out awards at the ceremony, including: Ray Meagher, Kate Ritchie, Rachel Griffiths, Deborah Mailman, Celia Pacquola, Luke McGregor, Stephen Peacocke, Michelle Lim Davidson, Claudia Karvan, Costa Georgiadis, Matt Shirvington, Sarah Abo, Larry Emdur, Charlie Albone and Stephen Curry.	
4	Cycling commentator Phil Liggett commentates his final Olympic match at the 2024 Summer Olympics, the women's road race, broadcast on the Nine Network.	
5	Foxtel announces a price increase for its several subscription packages from 1 September 2024, after the loss of several channels.	
7	Former television host Andrew O'Keefe is re-arrested just hours after a court appearance at Downing Centre Local Court.	
9	News Corp Australia puts Foxtel up for sale, as it prepares for the arrival of Warner Bros Discovery's Max streaming service in 2025.	
9	It is reported that Seven News's Brisbane sport presenter and former footballer Shane Webcke will not be presenting sport from January 2025 after 18 years, to allow more time to pursue family interests.	
11	It is announced Dr Chris Brown and Sonia Kruger will host the red carpet of the TV Week Logie Awards of 2024 on 18 August 2024. It is also announced that musicians Guy Sebastian and Jessica Mauboy will celebrate the career of John Farnham at the awards ceremony.	
12	The third season of Hunted premieres on Network 10.	
12	Lisa McCune and dance partner Ian Waite win the twenty-first season of Dancing with the Stars.	
13	News Breakfast weather presenter Nate Byrne has a panic attack whilst on air. He had before experienced panic attacks occasionally.	
13	It is confirmed that freelance Nine News Melbourne reporter Allan Raskall has left Nine in July.	
14	It is reported that Nine Network's coverage of the 2024 Summer Olympics received 19.5 million total reach viewers across the network, 9Gem and 9Now. In the first week of the Olympics, Nine received a total television reach of 17.5 million viewers (the highest weekly reach in VOZ history), while in the second week, Nine received a total television reach of 16.6 million viewers (the second highest weekly reach in VOZ history).	
15	The Australian Broadcasting Corporation announces that Bridget Brennan will be the new co-host of News Breakfast. She will succeed Lisa Millar, who leaves on 23 August.	
15	The Australian Broadcasting Corporation announces that it will reintroduce the ABC News Theme composed by Peter Wall and Tony Ansell, which was last used in 2005. The ABC also announce a rebrand of ABC News, to occur on 19 August.	
15	Network 10 announces that Sharyn Ghidella will anchor 10 News First Queensland from September 2024 when production of the bulletin is returned to Brisbane from Sydney, where Sandra Sully has anchored it since September 2020.	
16	Brooke Boney departs the Nine Network's breakfast program Today, after five years with the network, leaving to attend Oxford University.	
16	It is announced by Nine Entertainment that current Weekend Today news presenter Sophie Walsh will be the program's new co-host alongside Clint Stanaway, replacing Jayne Azzopardi, who is now the news presenter for the weekday Today program. Nine News reporter Lizzie Pearl will replace Walsh as news presenter.	
16	Tracy Grimshaw is presented with a lifetime achievement award at the Kennedy Awards.	
18	Larry Emdur wins the Gold Logie at the Logie Awards of 2024 while Rebecca Gibney is inducted into the Logie Hall of Fame.	
18	A decade-old photo containing Foxtel chief executive Patrick Delany demonstrating a Nazi salute is resurfaced, with Delany apologising the following day.	
19	Soap opera Neighbours begins its "Death in the Outback" week of episodes, when one character from the soap dies in the outback, after being announced on 5 July 2024.	
20	Seven News Brisbane journalist Steve Hart reportedly announces that he is leaving the network on 11 September 2024, to join WIN News in Wollongong.	
21	Nine Entertainment confirms its final commentary team for the 2024 Summer Paralympics, which begins on 28 August 2024 with the opening ceremony. Names include: Dylan Alcott, Sylvia Jeffreys, Ellie Cole, James Bracey, Todd Woodbridge, Roz Kelly, Kurt Fearnley, Annabelle Williams, Cate Campbell, Jessica Fox, Ryan Scott, Troy Sachs, Kelly Cartwright, Katrina Webb, Tim Matthews, Christie Dawes, John Maclean, Kate Naess and Felicity Johnson.	
26	It is revealed that celebrity chef Maggie Beer suffered a fall at home on the night of 25 August, and is recovering in hospital.	
27	It is announced that commentator Kane Cornes will join the Seven Network in time for the 2025 AFL season.	
31	Alice Monfries begins presenting Nine News Adelaide weekend bulletins alongside Will McDonald, after being announced on Sunday 25 August.	

=== September ===
Date	Event	Source
2	Sharyn Ghidella anchors her first 10 News First Queensland bulletin, resulting in production of the bulletin returning to TVQ-10 in Brisbane from Sydney, where Sandra Sully anchored it from September 2020 until 2024. Liz Cantor is appointed as the weather presenter.	
5	Adelaide's Nine Network station NWS celebrates its 65th anniversary.	
6	Sunrise news presenter Edwina Bartholomew announces live on the program that she has been diagnosed with chronic myeloid leukaemia.	
6	Former Seven News reporter Robert Ovadia reportedly drops a wrongful dismissal case against the Seven Network for family stress.	
8	Angela Cox anchors her first Seven News Sydney weeknight bulletin, alongside current presenter Mark Ferguson.	
11	After nearly fifty years with the ABC, television journalist and presenter Heather Ewart announces her retirement in March 2025.	
14	Former television star Andrew O'Keefe is reportedly revived by paramedic treatment, after overdosing at a home in Vaucluse. Officers arrested O'Keefe on Monday at Rose Bay Police Station.	
15	WIN Television owner and businessman Bruce Gordon will sue TVSN, after a court case was lodged with the Supreme Court of New South Wales in late-August. WIN explored opportunities to extend their three year licensing deal, but the TVSN channel transferred to the Seven Network in July.	
16	Seven News reporter Steve Hart joins WIN News as a presenter.	
16	Network 10's 2025 upfronts are held. Among the major announcements, the network confirms Big Brother is returning to the network, hosted by Mel Tracina. Talkin' 'Bout Your Generation also returns to the network. The network's 2025 scripted offerings include NCIS: Sydney, Neighbours, an Australian version of Ghosts, and a festive movie, called Staycation. It is also announced that its streaming service 10Play will rebrand to simply "10" in 2025.	
20	The Australian Broadcasting Corporation's managing director David Anderson orders an independent review into how audio featured in a September 2022 online article and 7.30 story came to be "incorrectly edited", after the Seven Network airs allegations claiming the ABC added additional gunshots to incorrectly illustrate former special forces major Heston Russell had committed war crimes. In 2023, Russell won a defamation case against the ABC; the ABC was ordered to pay Russell $390,000 after they failed to prove its reporting was in the public interest.	
20	It is reported that Seven News' Queensland news director Michael Coombes will leave the network on 31 October 2024.	
23	It is announced that journalist and AFL commentator Caroline Wilson is leaving the Nine Network to join the Seven Network's AFL coverage in 2025.	
24	Network 10 begins airing the third season of Taskmaster Australia.	
24	News Breakfast sport presenter and former Australian rules football player Tony Armstrong announces he is leaving the program on 4 October 2024.	
24	It is reported that Tasmania's Network 10 affiliate, Tasmanian Digital Television, will close its Tasmanian offices by 1 October 2024.	
24	It is reported that Hubbl managing director Les Wigan left Foxtel in August, whilst Amanda Laing, the head and chief content officer of Binge, left the service earlier in September. Wigan takes up an advisory role at Venu Sports, Fox Corporation's new US sports streaming joint venture with The Walt Disney Company's ESPN and Warner Bros. Discovery. This results in Foxtel restructuring its executives again, with Hilary Perchard leading the legacy Foxtel business as well as Hubbl and Foxtel's content acquisition, while Julian Ogrin leads a streaming and advertising division.	
25	Network 10 airs Toadie Rebecchi's final Neighbours episode as a regular cast member, after 29 years on the soap. Ryan Moloney, who portrays the character, will remain with the soap for guest appearances.	
25	It is announced that Nine News Sydney presenter Davina Smith is departing the program on 5 December 2024, and beginning her role as the Toowoomba reporter for A Current Affair.	
25	Craig Hutchison will leave the Nine Network to join the Seven Network's AFL coverage in 2025; his production company Rainmaker is also set to produce AFL programs for the network.	
25	Nine News announces the appointment of Gareth Parker as its Network News Content Director.	
29	It is reported that businessman Bruce Gordon retired from the boards of WIN Corporation, the private investment firm Birketu, and 41 private companies associated with businesses owned by him, in August 2024. Gordon will remain Birketu's "ultimate decision maker", while stepping back from daily management at WIN. Three of his family members: wife Judith, daughter Genevieve (the general manager of WIN's two radio stations) and son Andrew (chairman of WIN) still work at WIN, are part of the board, and are expected to become important people in Australian media.	
30	After three-and-a-half years in the role, Nine Entertainment CEO Mike Sneesby resigns, after leaving Nine's North Sydney headquarters on 27 September 2024.	
30	AFL journalist Mark Robinson fails to show up to his final AFL 360 program on Fox Footy, with co-host Gerard Whateley paying tribute to Robinson's experiences together. Whateley will continue alongside guest hosts in 2025, with former AFL player Garry Lyon as the top candidate to replace Robinson.	
30	Network 10 appoints Veronica Eggleton as the new sports presenter for 10 News First Queensland. With Eggleton joining newsreader Sharyn Ghidella and weather presenter Liz Cantor, this becomes the first time 10's Brisbane and Gold Coast station has had an all-female presenting team of on-air anchors.	
30	News Breakfast's sport presenter Tony Armstrong is criticised on the ABC's Media Watch program for undertaking voiceover work for NRMA commercials featuring the slogan "A Help Company", without the approval of the ABC.	

=== October ===
Date	Event	Source
2	Majella Hay (née Wiemers) is appointed Director of Content: Unscripted at the Seven Network.	
2	It is reported that Erin Edwards will return to the Seven Network in 2025, as the director of Brisbane and Gold Coast News, after she moved to Network 10 in June 2023 as Executive Editor of 10 News First Queensland.	
4	News Breakfast sport presenter Tony Armstrong presents his final program.	
4	Network 10 fires chief sport presenter Matt Burke, concluding the role in December 2024.	
7	It is reported that ABC's former Ripponlea studios at Gordon Street in Elsternwick, which were once the main studios for ABV, known for the filming of programs/series such as Countdown, SeaChange, Kath & Kim, Spicks and Specks, Bellbird and Adam Hills in Gordon Street Tonight, will be demolished in November 2024, with new owners Milieu Property constructing luxury apartments across six buildings. The broadcast tower will remain, becoming a sculptural element. Studio 31 at the mentioned ABC studios was decommissioned by the public broadcaster in November 2017, and the studio building was sold in June 2021 to Milieu, for 28.9 million.	
9	The Project's Sarah Harris apologises for using footage from the anti-Palestinian war expo in August on 6 October 2024, to make it seem that the pro-Palestinian rallies were violent.	
10	During an appearance via video link in Waverley Local Court, former television presenter Andrew O'Keefe is sentenced to a 30-month community corrections order and ordered to pay a total of $3,500 in fines, after pleading guilty to breaching an apprehended violence order in July and the possession of methamphetamine. Additionally, his driving licence is suspended for three months. O'Keefe is reportedly avoiding further jail time with the magistrate, agreeing that O'Keefe should enter a three-month rehabilitation program.	
11	It is reported that Brisbane-born journalist Sarah Greenhalgh will join Max Futcher as co-anchor of weekday Seven News Brisbane bulletins, beginning 21 October 2024. Journalist Katrina Blowers is also promoted to Queensland chief reporter.	
14	After fourteen years, Victoria Buchan announces her departure from Nine Entertainment, with her role as the director of communications and public relations made redundant by the media company. She departs on 1 November 2024.	
17	Nine Entertainment releases an independent review about its workplace practices and culture. The review report finds that Nine has a systemic issue with power and authority abuse, bullying, discrimination and sexual harassment, mainly in the company's broadcast division. The board of Nine reports that it is committed to implement all twenty-two recommendations.	
17	Foxtel Group's 2025 upfronts are held. Among the major announcements, the subscription service confirms that live sport is will be broadcast on streaming service Binge from 30 November 2024, at no extra cost. More live news channels will also be added to the streaming service, including Sky News Australia, the British version of Sky News, CNBC, and Fox Sports News. Foxtel and Binge's scripted programs includes The Last Anniversary, Strife and Mix Tape. Festive movie How to Make Gravy is expected to release in 2024, alongside international series Dune: Prophecy.	
20	Tai Tuivasa and his brother Logan win The Amazing Race Australia 8, winning $100,000 for their chosen charity, the Sydney Region Aboriginal Corporation.	
24	Nine Entertainment's 2025 upfronts are held. Australian versions of The Floor and The Golden Bachelor are confirmed, hosted by Rodger Corser and Samantha Armytage respectively. An Australian version of Chateau DIY is also confirmed, alongside scripted New Zealand dramas A Remarkable Place to Die (airing later in 2024) and Madam (airing in 2025). It is also announced that six FAST channels will be brought to 9Now, as part of a deal with BBC Studios.	
25	Angie Asimus presents her first weekend Seven News Sydney bulletin with Michael Usher, while continuing her role as weather presenter for Seven News Sydney from Sunday to Tuesday each week.	
27	Reuben De Melo wins the thirteenth season of The Voice.	
29	The director of news and current affairs at Seven West Media, Anthony De Ceglie, addresses the Melbourne Press Club, calling upon the Albanese government to scrap a commercial broadcasting tax introduced six decades ago, which costs the three commercial TV networks $45 million a year combined.	
29	Lucinda Cowden confirms her exit from Neighbours. She reports that she knew her character Melanie Pearson would be departing in December just days after co-star Ryan Moloney found out about his contract ending, Moloney had announced his exit from the soap in June 2024. She also confirmed the decision to leave the show was not hers, since the contracts for cast came up all at once.	
30	Special Broadcasting Service's 2025 upfronts are held. A documentary on the Robodebt scheme is confirmed. Other documentary series include: Great Australian Road Trips, The Idea of Australia, Australia: An Unofficial History, Our Medicine, The Secret DNA of Us and 2.6 Seconds. It is also announced that Alone Australia will be returning, now set in the West Coast Range in Tasmania. International series for SBS include: Daddy Issues (United Kingdom), Virdee (United Kingdom), the final season of The Handmaid's Tale, Playing Nice and Smilla's Sense of Snow. SBS Food programming includes the eighth season of The Cook Up with Adam Liaw, Marion Grasby's Endless Summer and Memory Bites with Matt Moran. SBS will have three digital local dramas in 2025: Moonbird, Warm Props (both on National Indigenous Television, SBS Viceland and on Demand) and Moni (on SBS Viceland and on Demand). There will be a full series of NITV's Big Backyard Quiz in 2025. It is also announced that three FAST channels will be brought to SBS on Demand: FIFA+ (launching in November), and news channels Euronews and France 24 (launching in 2025).	
30	The ABC appoints political journalist and Q+A presenter Patricia Karvelas to succeed Greg Jennett, as presenter of Afternoon Briefing in 2025, after she announced that she would be departing Radio National after ten years. Jennett is moving to the ABC Canberra newsroom as news presenter for the 7:00 pm ABC News ACT bulletin from Sunday to Thursday, while also conducting Stateline interviews. The current news presenter for the 7:00 pm ACT bulletin, James Glenday, will begin a new project in 2025.	
30	Guy Sebastian announces that he will not return as coach for the upcoming fourteenth season of The Voice.	

=== November ===
Date	Event	Source
3	It is reported that Southern Cross Austereo is having difficulties selling its regional television assets to Seven West Media and Paramount Networks UK & Australia (owner of Network 10), after SCA wrote that it had continued to "actively progress with the sale of its regional television assets" in an ASX statement from the previous week.	
3	Kylie and Brad quit the twentieth season of The Block, not returning for the auction.	
5	After being commissioned in September 2024 by managing director David Anderson, an independent review, led by Alan Sunderland, finds that the Australian Broadcasting Corporation incorrectly edited five additional sounds of gunshots in a September 2022 online article and 7:30 story investigating activities by Australian commandos during a 2012 deployment in Afghanistan.	
6	ABC TV, ABC News, SBS, the Seven Network, the Nine Network, Network 10 and Sky News Australia broadcast coverage of the 2024 United States presidential election.	
6	It is confirmed that Toadie Rebecchi will return to Neighbours for guest appearances, starting 27 November 2024. He left the soap opera as a regular cast member in September.	
7	After eight years, Amanda Patterson leaves her Queensland news director position at Nine News.	
8	The ABC's music program Countdown celebrates fifty years since it first premiered.	
10	Sisters Maddy and Charlotte Harry win the 20th season of The Block, with a profit of $1.55 million. For his final year on the series, billionaire Adrian Portelli buys all five renovated houses at auction for $15.03 million.	
11	After thirty years with the Seven Network, AFL legend and broadcaster Tim Watson announces his retirement from presenting sport on Seven News's Melbourne bulletin, with his final bulletin set to be broadcast on 20 December 2024.	
11	It is announced that former AFL player James Hird will join the Nine Network's Footy Classified and Footy Furnace programs in 2025, replacing Leigh Matthews for the latter.	
12	ADH TV reportedly put in a $15 million bid for Southern Cross Austereo's regional television stations, with ADH engaging 333 Capital and law firm Squire Patton Boggs.	
13	Seven Network's 2025 upfronts are held. Among the major announcements, the network confirms Shaun Micallef as the first celebrity for the upcoming 22nd season of Dancing with the Stars. First Dates also returns to the network. It is also announced that Seven will air AFL programming every day of the week in 2025, with The Morning Show extending by 30 minutes, finishing at midday, when a new hour-long Seven News bulletin at noon begins.	
15	After twelve years, Simon Hobbs leaves his Nine News Sydney news director role.	
15	It is announced that journalist Rebecca Maddern will be appointed as Seven's chief sports presenter, as part of an expanded role with Seven News Melbourne, beginning January 2025. Maddern will succeed Tim Watson, who retires on 20 December 2024.	
19	The Seven Network cancels its Seven News Gold Coast bulletin after announcing a significant overhaul of its news operations on the Gold Coast, with the final bulletin airing on 21 November 2024. Its Surfers Paradise newsroom is retained as a district bureau to provide Gold Coast coverage in the statewide 6:00 pm news.	
19	Italian friends Simone and Viviana win the 14th season of My Kitchen Rules.	
20	It is announced Nine News Melbourne reporter Dougal Beatty will depart Nine Entertainment at the end of November, after eleven years, to pursue corporate work at NAB. His roles at Nine will be assumed by former European correspondent Brett McLeod.	
21	The ABC's 2025 upfronts are held. Among the major announcements, the national broadcaster confirms that investigative journalist Linton Besser will replace Paul Barry as host of Media Watch in 2025, after Barry had served eleven years in the role. The ABC's scripted programming for 2025 will include a new drama, The Family Next Door and new seasons of returning programs Bay of Fires, Austin, Mother and Son, The Newsreader and Mystery Road: Origin, as well as new comedy Optics. 10 News First newsreader Chris Bath will replace Richard Glover as host of ABC Radio Sydney's Drive program from January 2025, whilst remaining with Network 10.	
23	It is reported that Seven News Gold Coast presenter Steve Titmus will move to Seven News Brisbane in December as sport presenter, replacing Shane Webcke.	
24	Matt Doran announces his departure from Weekend Sunrise, with his final program being broadcast on 8 December 2024.	
24	John Demetrios wins the 2nd season of Dessert Masters.	
27	The Seven Network announces that, after an eighteen-year absence, Craig Hutchison will return to the network in 2025, hosting The Agenda Setters alongside Kane Cornes and Nick Riewoldt.	
29	Foxtel confirms that it is not involved in the 2025 seasons of Gogglebox Australia, which will exclusively air on Network 10 and its catchup service 10Play. It is also announced that the Silbery family will not return to the program in 2025.	

=== December ===
Date	Event	Source
1	After a 33-year career with the network, Paul Vautin announces his retirement from the Nine Network.	
2	Michael Rowland announces he will be leaving his role as co-host of ABC News Breakfast after 15 years, with his last show to be broadcast on 13 December 2024.	
2	Ian Smith, best known for portraying Harold Bishop on Neighbours, informs 10 News First that he is leaving the soap after being diagnosed with pulmonary pleomorphic carcinoma, a rare form of lung cancer, which he has been told is terminal.	
2	Paul Barry presents his final episode of Media Watch after eleven years.	
2	Bluey wins the Children and Youth category at the Rose d'Or awards in London.	
3	Adam Cooney, host of Armchair Experts, confirms the show will not be returning to the Seven Network for the 2025 AFL season.	
4	The Special Broadcasting Service announces Myf Warhurst and Joel Creasey will not return to the commentary booth of the Eurovision Song Contest in 2025.	
4	After a 25-year career with the Seven Network, Josh Adsett leaves the network and is appointed by Network 10 as the executive editor for 10 News First Queensland.	
8	ABC News broadcasts its first ABC News New South Wales 7:00 pm bulletin from the ABC's Parramatta studios, with Jeremy Fernandez and Nakari Thorpe presenting the program.	
9	The Australian Broadcasting Corporation announces James Glenday will be the new co-host of News Breakfast from 20 January 2025, replacing Michael Rowland. In addition, Catherine Murphy will be the program's permanent sport presenter from that date, replacing Tony Armstrong.	
9	It is reported sport streaming platform DAZN could acquire News Corp's pay-TV service Foxtel as part of a deal which could be completed in December 2024.	
9	Following a complaint made against him by Nine Entertainment, Nine News Darwin executive producer and former Today Tonight reporter David Richardson departs Nine Entertainment.	
14	Seven News's US bureau chief David Woiwod begins as the new co-host of the Seven Network's Weekend Sunrise, succeeding Matt Doran.	
16	It is announced that community television stations C31 Melbourne and Channel 44 will receive $3 million in funding from the Albanese government, the largest funding in CTV's history.	
16	Network 10 appoints Tara Rushton as the Monday to Thursday sports presenter on 10 News First Sydney from 2025, with weekend sports presenter Scott Mackinnon expanding to Fridays.	
17	Southern Cross Austereo announces that it has agreed terms with Network 10 to sell its television licenses in regional Queensland (TNQ), southern New South Wales (CTC) and Victoria (GLV/BCV). The deal is scheduled to be completed by February 2025.	
17	BBC Studios announces that it is to team up with Disney to produce a film based on Ludo Studio's children's television series Bluey, to be released in 2027.	
23	News Corp Australia and Telstra, dual owners of the Foxtel Group, reach a financial agreement with British streaming and entertainment platform DAZN to sell Foxtel, including Kayo Sports and Binge, in a AU$3.4 billion deal. The agreement is expected to close in the second half of the 2025 fiscal year; it is reported that both News Corp Australia and Telstra will be given a small stake in the company.	
31	ABC TV broadcasts coverage of the 2024 New Year's Eve celebrations, with Robbie Williams headlining the New Year's Eve concert live from Sydney alongside numerous artists including Nooky, 1300, G Flip and Casey Donovan.	

== Premieres ==
=== Domestic series ===
List of domestic television series premieres
Program	Original airdate	Network(s)	Source
Planet Lulin	1 January	ABC Me	
Grand Designs Transformations	4 January	ABC TV	
Boy Swallows Universe	11 January	Netflix	
Prosper	18 January	Stan	
Steve Price	19 January	Sky News Australia	
Tipping Point Australia	29 January	Nine Network	
10 News First: Afternoon	29 January	Network 10	
The Jury	4 February	Sky News Australia	
Politics Now	6 February	Sky News Australia	
Eddie's Lil' Homies	16 February	NITV; Netflix	
House of Gods	25 February	ABC TV	
Fizzy & Suds	11 March	ABC Kids	
Population 11	14 March	Stan	
Apples Never Fall	14 March	Binge; Fox8	
Footy Furnace	17 March	Nine Network	
High Country	19 March	Binge; Showcase	
Tastes of the Tropics	20 March	SBS Food	
Gordon Ramsay's Food Stars	26 March	Nine Network	
Creative Types with Virginia Trioli	9 April	ABC TV	
Miriam Margolyes Impossibly Australian	9 April	ABC TV	
White Fever	10 April	ABC TV	
Danica and James	14 April	Sky News Australia	
Swift Street	24 April	SBS	
This Is Going to be Big	30 April	ABC TV	
The Tattooist of Auschwitz	2 May	Stan	
NZ Edition	4 May	Sky News Australia	
The Brighter Side	11 May	Network 10	
Tony Armstrong's Extra-Ordinary Things	21 May	ABC TV	
Secret Science	21 May	ABC TV	
Dream Home	26 May	Seven Network	
The Art Of	4 June	ABC TV	
Hard Quiz Kids	8 June	ABC Family	
Austin	9 June	ABC TV	
Ladies in Black	16 June	ABC TV	
Hotel Cocaine	17 June	Stan	
Monday's Experts	17 June	ABC TV	
Sydney Opera House Presents: Generations & Dynasties	17 June	National Indigenous Television	
Guillaume's French Atlantic	20 June	SBS	
Exposure	20 June	Stan	
Fake	4 July	Paramount+	
Fam Time	11 July	7plus	
The Hunters	22 July	Seven Network	
Critical Incident	12 August	Stan	
Shaun Micallef's Eve of Destruction	14 August	ABC TV	
Guy Montgomery's Guy Mont-Spelling Bee	14 August	ABC TV	
Made in Bondi	20 August	Seven Network	
Videoland	1 September	Netflix	
Talking W	2 September	Seven Network	
Return to Paradise	8 September	ABC TV	
The Weekly Football Wrap	9 September	SBS Viceland	
Human Error	11 September	Nine Network	
Last Days of the Space Age	2 October	Disney+	
Four Years Later	2 October	SBS	
Aussie Shore	3 October	Paramount+	
America, Are You Ok?	3 October	ABC News	
AFLW on Fox	6 October	Fox Footy; Kayo Sports	
Let's Eat with George	13 October	Nine Network	
Behind Behani	16 October	7Bravo	
Thou Shalt Not Steal	17 October	Stan	
The Office	18 October	Amazon Prime Video	
Plum	20 October	ABC TV	
Listing Melbourne	23 October	Nine Network	
Territory	24 October	Netflix	
Growing Home with Jamie Durie	25 October	Seven Network	
A Bite To Eat with Alice	28 October	ABC TV	
The Big Trip	13 November	Seven Network	
Budget Battlers	4 December	Nine Network	

=== International series ===
List of international television series premieres
Program	Original airdate	Country of origin	Network(s)	Source
Ted	11 January	United States	Binge; Fox8	
Made in Chelsea: Sydney	15 January	United Kingdom	Hayu	
Couple to Throuple	9 February	United States	Hayu	
The Irrational	12 February	United States	Seven Network	
Mr Bates vs The Post Office	14 February	United Kingdom	Seven Network	
Brits Down Under	16 February	United Kingdom	9Now	
Double Parked	20 February	New Zealand	ABC TV Plus	
1 News at Midday	4 March	New Zealand	SBS Viceland	
1 News at Six	4 March	New Zealand	SBS Viceland	
The Regime	4 March	United States	Binge; Showcase	
The Vanishing Triangle	7 March	Ireland	SBS	
Life After Life	9 March	United Kingdom	ABC TV	
Ten Year Old Tom	11 March	United States	SBS Viceland	
America's Got Talent: Fantasy League	14 March	United States	7flix	
I Literally Just Told You	20 March	United Kingdom	SBS	
The Reckoning	20 March	United Kingdom	BBC First	
Palm Royale	20 March	United States	Apple TV+	
The Valley	20 March	United States	Hayu	
Litvinenko	27 March	United Kingdom	SBS	
The 1% Club	27 March	United Kingdom	Seven Network	
Dora	12 April	United States	Paramount+	
After the Party	28 April	New Zealand	ABC TV	
The Marlow Murder Club	30 April	United Kingdom	Seven Network	
Jamie's Air-Fryer Meals	2 May	United Kingdom	Network 10	
After the Flood	13 May	United Kingdom	BritBox	
Lost Luggage	14 May	Belgium	SBS	
This Town	22 May	United Kingdom	SBS	
Davos 1917	23 May	Germany	SBS On Demand	
Insomnia	24 May	United Kingdom	Stan	
Don't Leave Me	29 May	Italy	SBS	
Style It Out	3 June	United Kingdom	ABC Family	
Lost Boys and Fairies	4 June	United Kingdom	Stan	
Extended Family	4 June	United States	7plus	
Orlando Bloom: To the Edge	5 June	United States	7Bravo	
Fantasmas	8 June (Binge); 9 June (Fox8)	United States	Binge; Fox8	
Catchphrase	11 June	United Kingdom	Seven Network	
The Fortress	13 June	Norway	SBS On Demand	
Coach	13 June	Iceland	SBS On Demand	
Murder Is Easy	23 June	United Kingdom	BBC First	
Alert: Missing Persons Unit	24 June	United States	Seven Network	
Emperor of Ocean Park	15 July	United States	Binge; Showcase	
Mr Bigstuff	17 July	United Kingdom	Binge	
Spies of Terror	25 July	France	SBS On Demand	
Malpractice	28 July	United Kingdom	Seven Network	
Rebus	1 August	United Kingdom	SBS On Demand	
Mr. Throwback	8 August; 9 August (Fox8)	United States	Binge; Fox8	
Lingo	12 August	United Kingdom	Network 10	
Sort Your Life Out	16 August	United Kingdom	Network 10	
Ammo	22 August	Norway	SBS On Demand	
Fight Night: The Million Dollar Heist	6 September	United States	Binge; Showcase	
Nightsleeper	15 September	United Kingdom	Stan	
Have I Got News for You U.S.	16 September	United States	SBS	
The Penguin	20 September	United States	Binge; Fox8	
Paris Has Fallen	26 September	France	SBS	
Joan	1 October	United Kingdom	Stan	
The Franchise	7 October; 10 October (Fox8)	United States	Binge; Fox8	
Karen Pirie	10 October	United Kingdom	7two	
Sweetpea	10 October	United Kingdom	Binge; Showcase	
Teacup	10 October	United States	Binge; Showcase	
Hysteria!	18 October; 19 October (Fox8)	United States	Binge; Fox8	
Rescue: HI-Surf	22 October	United States	Binge; Foxtel One	
Nautilus	25 October	United Kingdom	Stan	
Matlock	4 November	United States	Network 10	
The Day of the Jackal	7 November	United Kingdom	Binge; Showcase	
Jamie: Fast and Simple	15 November	United Kingdom	Network 10	
A Remarkable Place to Die	17 November	New Zealand	Nine Network	
Dune: Prophecy	18 November	United States	Binge	
Murder in a Small Town	18 November	Canada	Seven Network	
Máxima	20 November	Netherlands	SBS	
Steeltown Murders	21 November	United Kingdom	SBS	
Brilliant Minds	25 November	United States	Binge	
Get Millie Black	26 November	United Kingdom	Binge; Showcase	
Spinal Destination	28 November	New Zealand	NITV	
Douglas Is Cancelled	1 December	United Kingdom	ABC TV	
Earth Abides	2 December	United States	Stan	
Laid	19 December	United States	Binge	
Daddy Issues	19 December	United Kingdom	SBS	
Miss Fallaci	19 December	Italy	SBS	

=== Documentaries ===
==== Domestic ====
List of domestic documentary film/docuseries premieres
Documentary	Original airdate	Network(s)	Source
Nemesis	29 January	ABC TV	
The Matchmakers	14 February	SBS	
Australia's Sleep Revolution with Dr. Michael Mosley	6 March	SBS	
Making Waves: Extraordinary Women, One World Title.	8 March	SBS Viceland	
Ego: The Michael Gudinski Story	9 April	Seven Network	
Revealed: How To Poison A Planet	28 April	Stan	
Outback Outlaw Comedian	21 May	7mate	
Came From Nowhere	26 May	SBS	
Never Again: The Fight Against Antisemitism	28 May	Sky News Australia	
Kindred	2 June	National Indigenous Television	
Trailblazers	4 June	Stan	
The Hospital: In The Deep End	6 June	SBS	
Beyond The Dream	9 June	Nine Network	
Hunt For Truth: Tasmanian Tiger	12 June	SBS	
Revealed: Otto By Otto	16 June	Stan	
Do You Want to Live Forever?	17 June	Nine Network	
The Trump Presidency: As It Happened	18 June	7plus	
Fatal Flaws: The OceanGate Story	19 June	Seven Network	
Gaze: The First Family of Australian Basketball	20 June	Nine Network	
Megafauna: What Killed Australia's Giants?	25 June	ABC TV	
The Last Daughter	6 July	ABC TV	
I Was Actually There	9 July	ABC TV	
Maggie Beer's Big Mission	9 July	ABC TV	
The Australian: 60 Years of News	15 July	Sky News Australia	
City-Bay: 50 Years and Running	21 July	Nine Network	
Ray Martin: The Last Goodbye	14 August	SBS	
The Assembly	20 August	ABC TV	
Raiders Rising	24 August	Nine Network	
Revealed: KillJoy	8 September	Stan	
Shaun Micallef's Origin Odyssey	24 September	SBS	
Outback Crystal Hunters	30 September	7mate	
Australia's Most Dangerous Prisoners	2 October	Seven Network	
In The Box	13 October	SBS Viceland	
Red Flag: Music's Failed Revolution	15 October	SBS	
John Farnham: Celebrating 60 Years	31 October	Nine Network	
Revealed: Bribe, Inc.	3 November	Stan	
The Jury: Death on the Staircase	6 November	SBS	
Midnight Oil: The Hardest Line	12 November	ABC TV	
Headliners	19 November	ABC TV	
The Real Cost of Net Zero	19 November	Sky News Australia	
Osher Günsberg: A World of Pain	21 November	SBS	
Tsunami: 20 Years On	8 December	Nine Network	

==== International ====
List of international documentary film/docuseries premieres
Documentary	Original airdate	Country of origin	Network(s)	Source
Earth	23 January	United Kingdom	ABC TV	
The Price of Truth	27 February	United Kingdom	SBS	
Whale with Steve Backshall	27 February	United Kingdom	ABC TV	
Dynasties II	1 March	United Kingdom	Nine Network	
Why Planes Vanish: The Hunt for MH370	10 March	United Kingdom	Seven Network	
Secrets of the Jurassic Dinosaur	12 March	United Kingdom	BBC Earth	
Lockerbie	17 March	United Kingdom	Seven Network	
My Wife, My Abuser	25 March	United Kingdom	Nine Network	
The Life and Deaths of Christopher Lee	31 March	United States	SBS	
The Rise and Fall of Boris Johnson	1 April	United Kingdom	ABC TV	
New Wave: Dare To Be Different	3 April	United States	SBS Viceland	
Shakespeare: Rise of a Genius	9 April	United Kingdom	ABC TV	
Lost Temples of Cambodia	14 April	United Kingdom	SBS	
Martin Compston's Norwegian Fling	16 April	United Kingdom	BritBox	
The McBee Dynasty: Real American Cowboys	16 April	United States	7Bravo	
Tony Robinson's Marvellous Machines	29 April	United Kingdom	SBS	
Paul O'Grady's Great Elephant Adventure	3 May	United Kingdom	SBS	
Spacey Unmasked	8 May	United Kingdom	Nine Network	
100 Days that Rocked the Royals	9 May	United Kingdom	Nine Network	
Abandoned Railways From Above	17 May	United Kingdom	SBS	
Call Me Country: Beyoncé & Nashville's Renaissance	24 May	United States	Binge; Docos	
Cannes Uncut	25 May	United Kingdom	SBS	
The Missing Millionairess	26 May	United Kingdom	Nine Network	
Ren Faire	3 June	United States	Binge; Docos	
ABBA: Against the Odds	9 June	Sweden	ABC TV	
How Music Got Free	12 June	United States	Paramount+	
Federer: Twelve Final Days	20 June	United States	Amazon Prime Video	
Yellowstone One-Fifty	21 June	United States	Paramount+	
Loch Ness: They Created A Monster	26 June	United States	SBS Viceland	
The Movement and The Madman	28 June	United States	SBS	
The Nine Lives of...	29 June	United States	SBS Viceland	
Michael Mosley: The Doctor Who Changed Britain	3 July	United Kingdom	SBS	
History's Greatest Heists with Pierce Brosnan	4 July	United States	SBS Viceland	
Menendez Brothers: Murder by Media	7 July	United States	Stan	
Secrets of Hells Angels	7 July	United States	Binge	
Moulin Rouge: Yes We Can-Can!	10 July	United Kingdom	SBS	
Melissa Etheridge: I'm Not Broken	10 July	United States	Paramount+	
Faye	14 July	United States	Binge	
Turbulence: How Safe Is Your Flight?	15 July	United Kingdom	Seven Network	
In the Arena: Serena Williams	17 July	United States	ESPN	
The Secrets Of Mount Olympus	21 July	France	SBS	
Stormy	30 July	United States	SBS	
The Playboy Bunny Murder	1 August	United Kingdom	SBS Viceland	
Junior Doctors Down Under	1 August	United Kingdom	SBS	
Men For Sale: The Life of a Male Escort	2 August	United Kingdom	SBS Viceland	
Elizabeth Taylor: The Lost Tapes	4 August; 10 August (Famous)	United States	Binge; Famous	
The TikTok Effect	6 August	United Kingdom	Stan	
Michael Palin in Nigeria	14 August	United Kingdom	SBS	
TikTok: Murders Gone Viral	15 August	United Kingdom	Seven Network	
The Real CSI: Miami	18 August	United States	Network 10	
The Fall of the House of Murdaugh	18 August	United States	Stan	
Chimp Crazy	19 August	United States	Binge; Famous	
Coca Cola's Dirty Secret	19 August	United Kingdom	SBS Viceland	
Edward And Wallis: The Bahamas Scandals	24 August	United Kingdom	SBS	
Snowdon & Margaret: A Scandalous Affair	31 August	United Kingdom	SBS	
Secrets Of Our Universe With Tim Peake	4 September	United Kingdom	SBS	
Wise Guy	8 September; 9 September (Famous)	United States	Binge; Famous	
Mr Bates vs The Post Office: The Impact	15 September	United Kingdom	Seven Network	
Code Blue: One Punch Killers	25 September	United Kingdom	Seven Network	
The Abercrombie Guys: The Dark Side of Cool	25 September	United Kingdom	Stan	
National Parks from Above	26 September	United Kingdom	SBS	
Elizabeth Taylor: Rebel Superstar	2 October	United States	SBS	
Make America Swift Again	5 October	United States	SBS Viceland	
Stopping the Steal	29 October	United Kingdom	SBS	
Music by John Williams	1 November	United States	Disney+	
Kennedy	1 November	United States	SBS	
Trump: A Second Chance?	3 November	United Kingdom	Nine Network	
The Space Shuttle That Fell to Earth	11 November	United Kingdom	ABC TV	
Michael Mosley: Wonders of the Human Body	13 November	United Kingdom	SBS	
Tsunami: The Wave That Shook The World	17 November	United Kingdom	Seven Network	
Solar System	19 November	United Kingdom	ABC TV	
Surveilled	21 November	United States	Binge	
Harry and Meghan: The Rise and Fall	8 December	United Kingdom	Network 10	
Christopher Reeve, The Eternal Superman	22 December	France	SBS Viceland	

=== Specials ===
==== Domestic ====
List of domestic television special airdates
Special	Original airdate	Network(s)	Source
Aaron Chen: If Weren't Filmed, Nobody Would Believe	19 March	YouTube; Network 10	
Carl Barron: Skating Rink For Flies	7 April	Seven Network	
Blak Ball	29 May	ABC TV	
Big Backyard Quiz	13 July	National Indigenous Television	
Let The Games Begin	24 July	Nine Network	
30 Years of the Footy Show	20 August	Nine Network	
Jimeoin: Result	9 October	Seven Network	
Akmal: Open for Renovations	16 October	Seven Network	
Countdown 50 Years On	16 November	ABC TV	
A (Very) Musical Christmas	20 December	ABC TV	

== Television channels ==
=== New channels ===
Date	Channel	Provider	Reference
3 June	4 ABC iview streams	ABC iview	
28 June	Sky News Election Channel	Foxtel; Flash	
1 July	you.tv	Freeview	
1 August	BBC Drama	Fetch TV	
6 August	FashionTV	Foxtel; Binge	
15 August	Travel	Foxtel; Binge	
August	Outdoor Channel	Foxtel	
August	NatureTime	Foxtel	
August	Vevo pop	Foxtel	
August	Vevo 2K	Foxtel	
August	Vevo '90s	Foxtel	
August	Vevo retro rock	Foxtel	
3 September	DocPlay	Foxtel; Binge	
9 September	Main Event UFC	Foxtel; Kayo Sports	
11 November	FIFA+	SBS on Demand	
26 November	BBC Earth	9Now	
26 November	BBC Comedy	9Now	
26 November	BBC Food	9Now	
26 November	BBC Home & Garden	9Now	
26 November	Top Gear	9Now	
26 November	Antiques Roadshow	9Now	
December	True Crime Files	7plus	

=== Rebranding channels ===
Date	Old name	New name	Provider	Reference
3 June	ABC TV Plus	ABC Family	Freeview	
3 June	ABC Me	ABC Entertains	Freeview	
12 June	10 Bold	10 Bold Drama	Freeview	
12 June	10 Peach	10 Peach Comedy	Freeview	
1 August	Sleuth	British	Foxtel; Binge	
1 August	Docos	Famous	Foxtel; Binge	
1 August	Crime + Investigation	Real Crime	Foxtel; Binge	
1 August	History	Real History	Foxtel; Binge	

=== Closed channels ===
Date	Name	Provider	Reference
25 February	TBN Inspire	Foxtel	
29 February	Foxtel Movies Thriller	Foxtel	
29 February	Sci-Fi	Foxtel	
1 April	ishop TV	Freeview	
30 June	Mildura Digital Television	Freeview	
31 July	BBC Earth	Foxtel; Binge	
31 July	BBC First	Foxtel; Binge; Fetch TV	
31 July	BBC News	Foxtel; Binge	
31 July	CBeebies	Foxtel; Binge	
31 July	A&E	Foxtel; Binge	
31 October	BBC Kids	Fetch TV	
31 October	CBeebies	Fetch TV	
20 November	Travel	Foxtel; Binge	
31 December	WWE Channel	Foxtel; Binge	

== Programming changes ==
=== Changes to network affiliation ===
Criterion for inclusion in the following list is that Australian premiere episodes will air in Australia for the first time on a new channel. This includes when a program is moved from a free-to-air network's primary channel to a digital multi-channel, as well as when a program moves between subscription television channels – provided the preceding criterion is met. Ended television series which change networks for repeat broadcasts are not included in the list.

List of domestic television series which changed network affiliation
Program	Date	New network	Previous network	Source

List of international television programs which changed network affiliation
Program	Date	New network	Previous network	Country of origin	Source
American Idol	4 April	7plus	Nine Network	United States	
Days of Our Lives	3 June	10Play	9Gem; Foxtel One	United States	
Wreck	5 June	ABC Entertains	ABC TV Plus	United Kingdom	
Unbroken	11 June	SBS	SBS On Demand	Germany	
The Young and the Restless	1 July	10Play	9Gem; Foxtel One	United States	
Friends	1 July	Stan	Binge	United States	
Hudson & Rex	6 July	SBS Viceland	SBS On Demand	Canada	
Interview with the Vampire	31 July	ABC Entertains	ABC TV	United States	
Rebus	15 August	SBS	SBS On Demand	United Kingdom	
Freezing Embrace	19 September	SBS	SBS On Demand	Finland	

=== Free-to-air premieres ===
This is a list of documentaries and programs which made their premiere on Australian free-to-air television that had previously premiered on Australian subscription television or on streaming service providers in Australia. Programs may still air on the original subscription television network or streaming service.

List of international television programs which premiered on free-to-air television for the first time
Program	Date	Free-to-air network	Subscription network(s)	Country of origin	Source
Luann and Sonja: Welcome to Crappie Lake	13 February	7Bravo	Hayu	United States	
Couple to Throuple	27 March	7Bravo	Hayu	United States	
The Suspect	6 April	ABC TV	BritBox	United Kingdom	
The Luminaries	28 April	ABC TV	Paramount+	United Kingdom; New Zealand	
NCIS: Sydney	15 May	Network 10	Paramount+	Australia	
Tulsa King	26 May	Network 10	Paramount+	United States	
The Drew Barrymore Show	3 June	Network 10	Arena	United States	
The Cleaner	4 June	ABC Entertains	BritBox	United Kingdom	
Nicole Kidman: Eyes Wide Open	5 June	SBS	Binge; Docos	France	
Bosch: Legacy	6 June	SBS On Demand	Amazon Prime Video	United States	
The Beer Pioneer	13 June	C31 Melbourne	iWonder	Australia	
Limitless with Chris Hemsworth	17 June	Nine Network	Disney+	United States	
Kings of Pain	18 June	7mate	History	United States	
Under the Banner of Heaven	3 July	SBS Viceland	Disney+	United States	
Breeders	16 July	ABC Entertains	Binge; Foxtel One	United Kingdom	
The Marvelous Mrs. Maisel	18 July	SBS On Demand	Amazon Prime Video	United States	
Paris in Love	23 July	7Bravo	Hayu	United States	
Fifteen-Love	28 July	ABC TV	BBC First; Binge	United Kingdom	
Kiss the Future	1 September	SBS	Paramount+	United States	
The Sixth Commandment	4 September	SBS	BBC First; Binge	United Kingdom	
Better	15 September	ABC TV	BBC First; Binge	United Kingdom	
Bali 2002	7 October	Nine Network	Stan	Australia	
The Valley	8 October	7Bravo	Hayu	United States	
Top Gear Australia	17 October	Network 10	Paramount+	Australia	
Nolly	18 October	ABC TV	Binge; Foxtel On Demand	United Kingdom	
NCIS: Origins	23 October	Network 10	Paramount+	United States	
The Old Man	30 October	SBS	Disney+	United States	
Love Me	1 December	ABC TV	Binge	Australia	

=== Subscription premieres ===
This is a list of programs which made their debut on Australian subscription television, having previously premiered on Australian free-to-air television. Programs may still air (first or repeat) on the original free-to-air television network.

List of domestic television programs which premiered on subscription television for the first time
Program	Date	Free-to-air network	Subscription network(s)	Country of origin	Source
Matlock	5 November	Network 10	Paramount+	United States	

=== Returning programs ===
Australian produced programs which are returning with a new season after being absent from television from the previous calendar year.

Program	Return date	Previous run(s)	Type of return	Previous channel	New/same channel	Source
Gladiators	15 January	1995–1996; 2008	Reboot	Seven Network	Network 10	
Deal or No Deal	29 January	2003–2013	Revival	Seven Network	Network 10	
Wide World of Sports	3 March	1981–1999; 2008–2016	Revival	Nine Network	same	
Talking Footy	6 March	1994–2004; 2013–2020	Revival	Seven Network; 7mate	Seven Network	
Ready Steady Cook	8 March	2005–2013	Revival	Network 10	same	
Melbourne Weekender	14 April	2005; 2015–2020	Revival	Seven Network	same	
Jeopardy! Australia	20 April	1970–1978; 1993	Reboot	Seven Network; Network 10	Nine Network	
10 Late News	29 April	1991–2011; 2012–2014	Revival	Network 10	same	
Top Gear Australia	17 May	2008–2012	Revival	SBS; Nine Network	Paramount+	
The Great Outdoors	5 October	1993–2009; 2012	Revival	Seven Network	same	
Grand Designs Australia	10 October	2010–2023	Revival	Lifestyle	ABC TV	
Wheel of Fortune	25 November	1981–2006; 2008	Reboot	Seven Network; Nine Network	Network 10	

=== Endings ===
List of domestic television series endings
Program	End date	Network(s)	Start date	Source
Boy Swallows Universe	11 January 2024	Netflix	11 January 2024	
Gladiators	28 January 2024	Network 10	15 January 2024	
Nemesis	12 February 2024	ABC TV	29 January 2024	
Total Control	18 February 2024	ABC TV	13 October 2019	
Grand Designs Transformations	22 February 2024	ABC TV	4 January 2024	
Apples Never Fall	14 March 2024	Binge; Fox8	14 March 2024	
House of Gods	31 March 2024	ABC TV	25 February 2024	
Better Date than Never	2 April 2024	ABC TV	24 January 2023	
Tastes of the Tropics	3 April 2024	SBS Food	20 March 2024	
Gordon Ramsay's Food Stars	24 April 2024	Nine Network	26 March 2024	
High Country	30 April 2024	Binge; Showcase	19 March 2024	
This Is Going to be Big	7 May 2024	ABC TV	30 April 2024	
Swift Street	15 May 2024	SBS	24 April 2024	
Tony Armstrong's Extra-Ordinary Things	18 June 2024	ABC TV	21 May 2024	
The Hospital: In The Deep End	20 June 2024	SBS	6 June 2024	
Megafauna: What Killed Australia's Giants?	2 July 2024	ABC TV	25 June 2024	
Fake	4 July 2024	Paramount+	4 July 2024	
The Brighter Side	6 July 2024	Network 10	11 May 2024	
Do You Want to Live Forever?	8 July 2024	Nine Network	17 June 2024	
Fam Time	11 July 2024	7plus	11 July 2024	
Maggie Beer's Big Mission	23 July 2024	ABC TV	9 July 2024	
Monday's Experts	5 August 2024	ABC TV	17 June 2024	
Critical Incident	12 August 2024	Stan	12 August 2024	
Armchair Experts	27 September 2024	Seven Network	23 March 2018	
Last Days of the Space Age	2 October 2024	Disney+	2 October 2024	
Human Error	16 October 2024	Nine Network	11 September 2024	
Red Flag: Music's Failed Revolution	22 October 2024	SBS	15 October 2024	
Four Years Later	23 October 2024	SBS	2 October 2024	
Seven News Gold Coast	21 November 2024	Seven Network	4 July 2016	
Media Bites	5 December 2024	ABC Online	2 February 2017	
Erin	6 December 2024	Sky News Australia	19 June 2022	
Bump	26 December 2024	Stan	1 January 2021	

== Deaths ==
Name	Date of death	Age	Broadcasting notability	Reference
Lillian Crombie	3 January	aged 66	Indigenous Australian actress and dancer, known for The Secret Life of Us, Double Trouble, Heartland, Blackout, Ring of Scorpio and Deadly. Also acted in films including Australia, Lucky Miles and Mystery Road.	
Dawn Kenyon	20 January	aged 91	Television producer and children's television presenter, known as the "first lady of children's television". She appeared on shows Captain Fortune and Romper Room, where she was known as "Miss Dawn".	
Troy Beckwith	24 January	aged 48	Actor known for playing Michael Martin in Neighbours from 1992 to 1998. He also acted in Blue Heelers, Pugwall, The Miraculous Mellops, Good Guys, Bad Guys, Snowy and Halifax f.p..	
Gregory Charles Rivers	2 February	aged 58	Australian-born Hong Kong film and television actor. Worked in shows including TVB's Twilight of a Nation.	
Harold Mitchell	10 February	aged 81	Australian advertising figure and media buyer, who served as a long-term chairman of FreeTV Australia.	
John Barton	17 February	aged 73	Brisbane-based news anchor. Later moved to Kuala Lumpur to work at the Asia-Pacific Broadcasting Union.	
Jarred Bocca	18 February	aged 35	Worked at Endemol Shine Australia for a decade and eventually became the series producer of MasterChef Australia in August 2023.	
Jesse Baird	19 February	aged 26	Television presenter and AFL goal umpire. He presented Gamify and was a reporter for Studio 10 and Totally Wild.	
Leigh Maughan	28 February	aged in his 80s (exact age unknown)	Founding father of the Newcastle Knights. Best known for his commentary career, in which he worked as a Newcastle sports commentator for the local radio station 2NX, then switched to the locally based NBN television station in the same role.	
Michael Jenkins	4 March	aged 77	Writer/director of several feature films, including Careful, He Might Hear You, Robbery Under Arms, and Emerald City. Also writer/director of numerous television series, including Water Under the Bridge and Blue Murder.	
Craig Campbell	4 March	aged 78	Television newsreader that worked at the Nine Network, WIN Television and Network 10. Worked in Ballarat, Bendigo, Geelong, Sydney and Rockhampton. He later worked in real estate and publishing.	
Mike McColl-Jones	11 March	aged 86	Prolific comedy writer, who wrote for Don Lane, Graham Kennedy, Bert Newton, Mary Hardy and Steve Vizard. McColl-Jones wrote comedy scripts for numerous television productions, including In Melbourne Tonight, The Don Lane Show, Tonight with Bert Newton, Tonight Live with Steve Vizard and The Graham Kennedy Show.	
Grant Page	14 March	aged 85	Pioneering stuntman best known for the Mad Max films. TV credits include Police Rescue, All Saints, Blackjack, All the Rivers Run, Snowy River: The McGregor Saga, The Alice, Grass Roots, and Danger 5.	
Ray Lindsay	17 March	not given	Longtime floor manager for ATV. Worked on Prisoner and Neighbours.	
Rob Brown	21 March	aged 62	Seven News cameraman.	
Bill Hughes	7 April	aged 79	Prolific director / producer. Credits include: The Graham Kennedy Show (as sound engineer), Homicide (as music editor, later director), Phoenix (as producer) and many more shows as director and producer.	
Nathan Templeton	9 April	aged 44	10 News First and Seven News reporter. Also worked for Sunrise as its Melbourne correspondent and a reporter and reported for several Olympic Games.	
Ian Parmenter	14 April	aged 79	British-born Australian chef and host of ABC TV's Consuming Passions.	
James Laurenson	18 April	aged 84	New Zealand-British actor for theatre, television and film. Best known in Australia for playing the titular character in detective television series Boney. Also worked in Britain for series including The Prison and The Crown and arrived in London in the early 1960s.	
Graham Webb	26 April	aged 88	Radio and television broadcaster. Created and hosted Sounds in 1974 (then called Sound Unlimited) for the Seven Network. Also hosted Blind Date from 1967 until November 1969 and an Australian version of Jeopardy! in the early 1970s. Worked for 2TM, 4BH, 4GY, 2CH, 2UE, 4KQ, 2GB, 2SM and 2UW and co-founded Sunshine FM on the Sunshine Coast.	
Max Rowley	4 May	aged 87	Veteran TV and radio announcer, entertainer and voiceover. Voiced across the Seven Network, Nine Network and Network 10. Also voiceover and presenter for the Australian Broadcasting Corporation, AWA, 2CH, 2UE, 2GB, 2KY, KIIS 106.5 (previously Mix 106.5 and 2UW) and John Laws' show. Rowley also voiced over 48,000 television commercials. Television/film credits include Come in Spinner, The Dismissal, It's a Knockout (as announcer), Perfect Match (as announcer), Great Temptation (as announcer), High Rollers (as announcer), Harp in the South, Dad and Dave, Sons and Daughters and Willisee's Australians. He was a guest in comedy show episodes of The Mavis Bramston Show, The Paul Hogan Show and The Tony Hancock Show. Also named and is namesake of the Max Rowley Media Academy.	
Brian Wenzel	6 May	aged 94	Actor best known for A Country Practice. Also acted in Neighbours and numerous other shows including Division 4.	
Ignatius Jones	7 May	aged 66	Singer, actor and director, known for Jimmy and the Boys. Acted in Sweet and Sour, Culture Shock and Home and Away.	
Pat Lavelle	17 May	aged 95	Former segment producer for The Mike Walsh Show and later, the producer for Beauty and the Beast and This is Your Life.	
Frank Ifield	18 May	aged 86	British-born musician and television presenter (The Frank Ifield Show and Frank Ifield Sings). Entered the Eurovision Song Contest twice and appeared numerous times on variety television.	
Ric Gordon	25 May	aged 69	TV doctor, fertility and obstetrician specialist, who delivered more than 5000 babies in his career. Also a regular guest on the Today program and hosted Good Medicine, for nine years.	
Bob Rogers	29 May	aged 97	Radio and TV presenter, who spent 78 years in the radio industry, including on Sydney radio stations 2SM, 2GB and 2CH. Also hosted The Bob Rogers Show on the Seven Network in the 1970s for five years.	
Ross Booth	3 June	aged 72	Commentator for Victorian Football League (previously Victorian Football Association) games on ABC TV. Also worked at the Melbourne newspaper The Age.	
John Blackman	4 June	aged 76	Radio and TV presenter, voice-artist, comedy writer and author. Best known for his voice-over work for the long-running Nine Network comedy variety show Hey Hey It's Saturday from 1971 until 1999 and then returning for the reunion specials in 2009 and in 2021, with a brief relaunch in 2010.	
Michael Mosley	5 June	aged 67	British television presenter, journalist, broadcaster, doctor and documentary maker. Created 2 documentaries in Australia for SBS, Australia's Health Revolution and Australia's Sleep Revolution. Was mostly known for his BBC appearances and documentaries, including Trust Me, I'm a Doctor.	
Andrew McVitty	6 June	aged 68	Pioneer of Australian music television, who helped launch Nightmoves on the Seven Network in 1977, which did not end until 1984.	
Greg Quicke	7 June	aged 62	Television astronomer, known for the Stargazing Live specials on the ABC and the BBC.	
Michael Gibson	10 June	aged 69	Television and radio entertainer. Appeared on and produced Agro's Cartoon Connection and The New Channel Niners and later became the head writer, producer, promotions manager and station voice for QTQ, the Nine Network station in Brisbane.	
Judith Whelan	26 June	aged 63	Former Australian Broadcasting Corporation senior executive director, including managing programs such as Back Roads, Gardening Australia and Landline. Also one of 3 female editors for The Sydney Morning Herald, including for its Good Weekend magazine and the Saturday edition of the newspaper.	
Ron E Sparks	13 July	aged 72	Broadcaster and voice over artist. Mainly worked in radio, working at 2SM, 2UW, 2Day FM, Nova 96.9, 101.7 WSFM and was the voice of Canberra station 2CA for three decades. He also guest-hosted an episode of the ABC's Countdown and was a television voiceover man for game shows such as Wheel of Fortune and Hot Streak.	
David Morrow	16 July	aged 71	Broadcaster and commentator, known for his long association with the ABC and calling of the NRL.	
Robin Eastwood	23 July	aged 62	Line producer and production manager, known for several documentaries, films and series, including: Desperately Seeking Sheila, Who Do You Think You Are?, Monash and Me, Ganja Queen and Every Family Has a Secret. Her career spanned more than three decades across documentaries, variety programs, factual television programs, television dramas and television commercials.	
Janet Andrewartha	26 July	aged 72	Actress in television and theatre, known for Prisoner and Lyn Scully in Neighbours.	
Peter Aanensen	26 July	aged 92	Actor in television and theatre, known for Jim Bacon in Bellbird, Merv Poole in Blue Heelers and Prisoner.	
Jane Hansen	6 August	not given	Former A Current Affair reporter, journalist, war correspondent and author of the book Boned.	
Babs Wheelton	18 August	aged 93	Actress in television, radio and theatre, known for her multiple roles in Prisoner, side roles in Bellbird, Cop Shop, Carson's Law, Be Blunt and Young Ramsay.	
Sam Landsberger	20 August	aged 35	Herald Sun journalist and contributor on Foxtel's Fox Footy.	
Tim Bowden	1 September	aged 87	Prolific ABC broadcaster, journalist and author of 18 books, best known for hosting the Backchat series for 8 years.	
Maret Archer	2 September	aged 75	Television actress, best known for portraying Beryl (mother of Darren Smith) in Paul Fenech's Housos and spin-off films Housos vs. Authority and Fat Pizza vs. Housos.	
Marty Morton	6 September	aged 82	England-born Australian entertainer best known for his appearances on the Super Flying Fun Show with his Emu sidekick, after comedian Rod Hull left Australia. He also acted in series including Spyforce, Division 4, The Young Doctors, All Saints and The Restless Years.	
Neil Inall	6 September	aged 91	Rural journalist, radio and television presenter.	
Graham McNeice	12 September	aged 76	Veteran Australian documentary filmmaker, television presenter, race caller and sport commentator, known for bringing satellite television to Australia and founding executive producer for Club Superstation. Also worked for Network 10.	
Lex Marinos	13 September	aged 75	Australian actor, best known for TV sitcom Kingswood Country. Later became a Triple J presenter and hosted Late Night Legends on ABC2 (now ABC Family).	
Kevin Miles	13 September	aged 95	Best known for roles in The Link Men (John Randall), Dynasty (David Mason) and Carson's Law (Godfrey Carson).	
Tim Brooke-Hunt	24 September	not given	Former children's television producer, the ABC's Executive Head of Children's Content and Controller of Children's until he left the ABC in 2013.	
Fiona MacDonald	3 October	aged 67	Former television presenter, best known for co-hosting Wombat and It's a Knockout.	
George Negus	15 October	aged 82	Journalist and television presenter, best known as a reporter for This Day Tonight and a founding correspondent for 60 Minutes. Negus later presented Today, Foreign Correspondent (as founding presenter), Dateline, George Negus Tonight and 6.30 with George Negus.	
Matt Peacock	30 October	aged 72	ABC journalist and author of Killer Company, who worked for a range of television and radio programs. He began his career in 1973 as a researcher for This Day Tonight, and became a specialist trainee on Four Corners and Monday Conference. Some of his career was in radio, reporting for ABC radio programs AM, PM, Background Briefing and The World Today and was the chief political correspondent for current affairs radio in ABC's Canberra bureau, from 1997 until 2000. He was also the ABC's foreign correspondent in Washington, D.C., New York (early 1990s) and London (2001–2003). He mainly investigated the use of harmful asbestos fiber in building materials (including housing), spanning his entire 30-year career, contributing stories for 7.30 and other media outlets, including a feature in the New Scientist magazine.	
Candy Devine	October	aged 85	Broadcaster and singer	
Ken Shorter	November	aged 79	Actor best known for the series You Can't See 'Round Corners, its film adaptation and the 1974 film Stone. Also had numerous guest roles including in Play School and Number 96.	
Clark Taylor	11 November	aged 87	Pastor and Australian television evangelist, best known for founding the International Network of Churches. Appeared in New Way of Living.	
Eileen Kramer	15 November	aged 110	Dancer, performer, choreographer, actor and writer, known for touring with the Bodenwieser Ballet. Appeared in One Plus One and The End.	
Janet "Jan" Kingsbury	November	aged 85	Actress and children's presenter, best known as a host on Play School from 1969 until 1986. As an actress had numerous guest roles in soap operas including Home and Away.	
Maggie Tabberer	6 December	aged 87	Model, fashion entrepreneur and television personality, best known as the fashion editor of the Australian Women's Weekly for 15 years. A two-time Gold Logie recipient, she appeared in Beauty and the Beast, her own show Maggie, Midday, Good Morning Australia and The Home Show (with then-partner Richard Zachariah).	
Clive Robertson	December	aged 78	Television and radio personality. Appeared in Beauty and the Beast, 11AM and Newsworld.	
Hugh Cornish	12 December	aged 90	Pioneering Queensland television personality and newsreader, host of "Brisbane Tonight" and "Stairway to the Stars", later took on an executive position as General Manager of the Nine Network in Brisbane.	
