= The Nightly =

Australian digital newspaper

- Format: Digital
- Owner: Seven Media Group
- Editor-in-chief: Christopher Dore
- Editor: Sarah-Jane Tasker
- Founded: 26 February 2024; 2 years ago
- Headquarters: 50 Hasler Road, Osborne Park, Western Australia
- Sister newspapers: The West Australian
- Website: thenightly.com.au
- Free online archives: thenightly.com.au/editions

The Nightly is an Australian daily digital newspaper, published by Seven Media Group. Its editorial team works from both Perth, Western Australia, and Sydney, New South Wales, and publishes its newspaper edition on weekdays at 6 p.m. AEST (or AEDT during daylight savings).

== History and operations ==
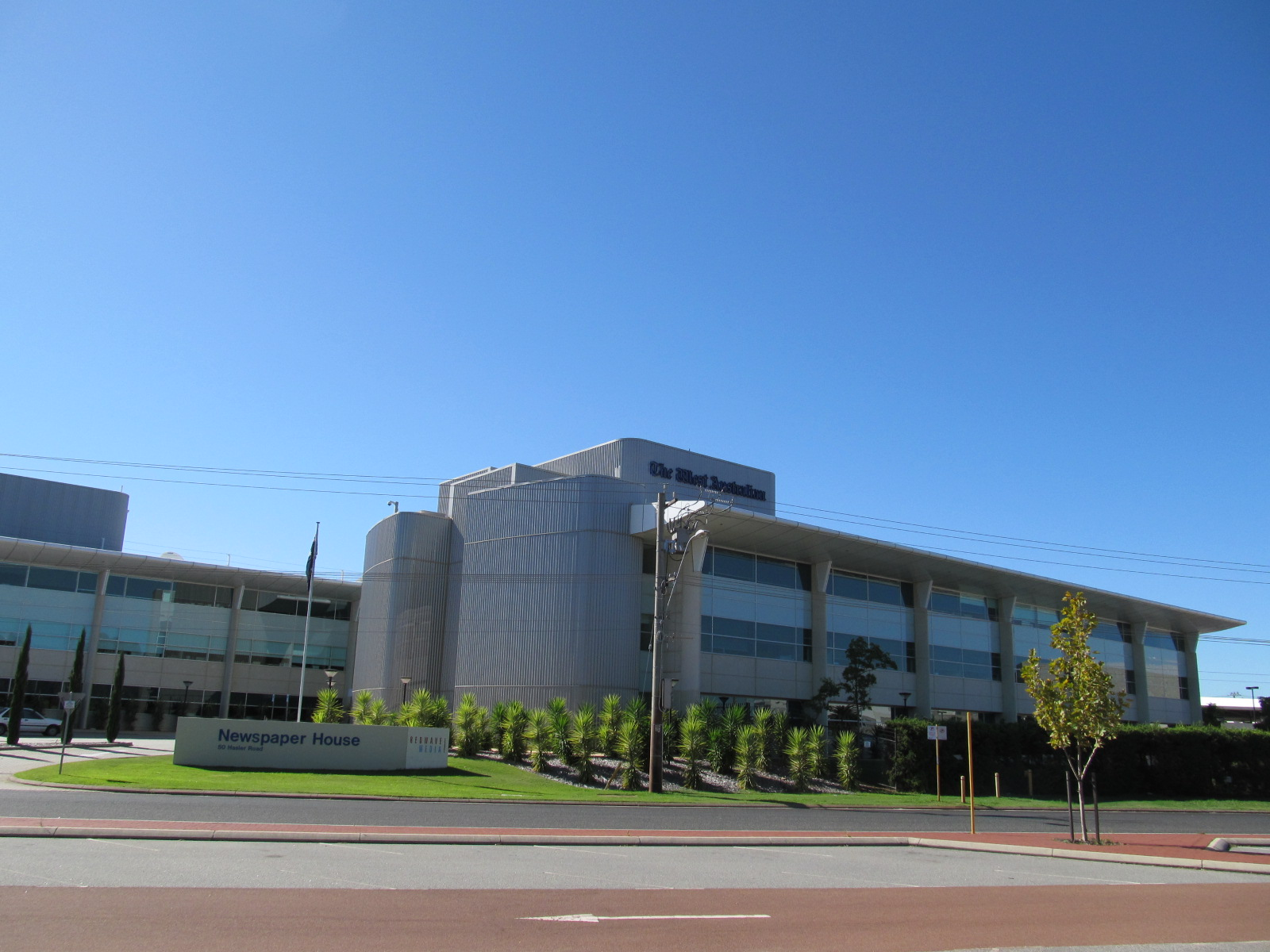
Headquarters of The West Australian, where The Nightly is also produced

The paper was originally developed and launched by Seven West Media, prior to its merger with Southern Cross Media in 2026. The Nightly is targeted at the east coast market, but unlike Seven West's eastern products, it is edited and produced in Western Australia. Reportedly, Seven West owner Kerry Stokes was dissatisfied with the influence of the Seven Network in the eastern states, which is substantially lesser than that delivered by The West Australian, which is the only daily newspaper in that state. By September 2024, eight-tenths of The Nightly's 2.84 million readers came from outside Western Australia. The Nightly aimed to compete for readers of The Australian and Australian Financial Review. Gina Rinehart, Chris Ellison and Katie Page were early backers of the paper.

The paper operates from The West Australian's offices, although at launch half of its team worked from Sydney. This is in order to take advantage of the time zone difference between Perth and the east coast to publish later in the day: Seven West argued that audiences are now free during the evening rather than the morning. The paper's website and app were developed with Google, who also had input into the paper's design. On its launch day, The Nightly's app was the most downloaded free app in Australia.

Seven West trademarked the paper's name in November 2023. Staff were drawn from other Seven West publications and headhunted from News Corp Australia. Reportedly, The Nightly attempted to secure child journalist Leonardo Puglisi as a political columnist. The paper was launched on 26 February 2024. At launch, its editor-in-chief was Anthony De Ceglie, and Sarah-Jane Tasker was its editor. De Ceglie moved to Seven West's television division and was replaced by Christopher Dore on an acting basis from May 2024, until Dore was permanently appointed in August.

Industry commentators expressed scepticism at the decision to launch a new digital publication in a crowded market with weakening advertising revenue. However, De Ceglie claimed that the paper was profitable as of April 2024. Ipsos data found that 1.808 million people had read The Nightly in April, more than doubling its audience in March.

The Nightly was the only department of Seven West Media not to have jobs cut in a mid-2024 round of redundancies.

In March 2025, The Nightly entered the top twenty of the Ipsos Iris ranking of media sites for the first time.

== Content ==
The paper has an agreement to republish articles from The New York Times, The Economist and CNBC. The Nightly also includes content from the Daily Mail, The Washington Post, The Daily Telegraph, as well as newswires PA Media and Australian Associated Press.

== Editorship ==
=== Editor-in-chief ===
- Anthony De Ceglie (February–May 2024)
- Christopher Dore (May 2024 – present; acting May–August)

=== Editor ===
- Sarah Jane-Tasker (February 2024 – present)

=== Editorial stance ===
De Ceglie claimed that The Nightly targets the "mainstream middle" of Australian politics, but it has been described as a right-leaning publication. The paper professes itself to be "economically conservative, socially progressive", but its stance in practice has been unclear, and many of the opinion pieces published by the paper have been socially conservative.
