= Cameron Borgas =

Australian cricketer

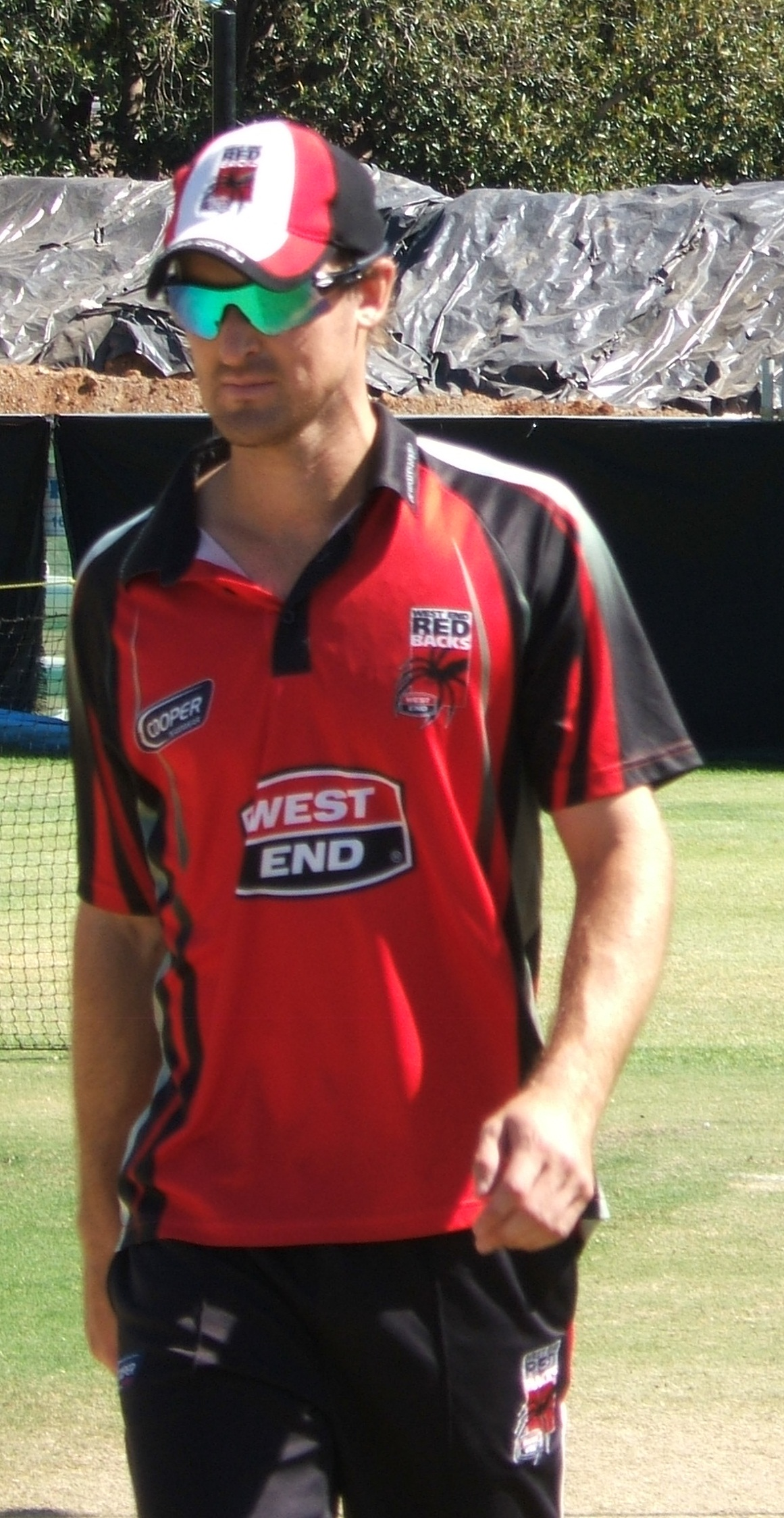
- Borgas in February 2010

Personal information
- Full name: Cameron James Borgas
- Born: 1 September 1983 (age 43); Adelaide, South Australia
- Nickname: Borgy
- Height: 1.86 m (6 ft 1 in)
- Batting: Right-handed
- Bowling: Right-arm offbreak
- Role: Batsman

Domestic team information
- Years: Team
- 2000/01–2011/12: South Australia
- 2011/12: Adelaide Strikers
- 2012/13: Wellington
- 2012/13–2013/14: Sydney Thunder
- 2012/13: Rangpur Riders
- FC debut: 2 March 2001 South Australia v Western Australia
- LA debut: 23 October 2005 South Australia v New South Wales

Career statistics
Competition	FC	LA	T20
Matches	37	67	58
Runs scored	1,891	1,696	933
Batting average	30.50	33.92	21.20
100s/50s	4/8	0/8	0/2
Top score	164*	90	62*
Balls bowled	42	128	24
Wickets	0	2	0
Bowling average	–	74.00	–
5 wickets in innings	–	0	–
10 wickets in match	–	0	–
Best bowling	–	1/2	–
Catches/stumpings	14/–	16/–	28/0
- Source: CricketArchive, 21 May 2023

Cameron James Borgas (born 1 September 1983) is an Australian former cricketer who played for the Southern Redbacks and Adelaide Strikers. He was a right-handed middle order batsman and has previously represented Australia at under 19 level. He also played A grade cricket for Sturt District Cricket Club.

He was just 17 years old when first contracted by the Redbacks. He played a couple of games in 2000–01 but it was in 2005–06 that he showed his talent with maiden century of 140 against Tasmania. That was followed with an innings of 149 against New South Wales at Adelaide Oval. Borgas also played a part in their one-day campaign in which they narrowly lost the final.

On 15 October 2006, he was the hero in the last over as they beat NSW in a one-day game. With 18 required off the final over, he hit three sixes as they won with two balls remaining. He finished unbeaten on 31 off 9. In January 2011, Borgas was named man of the match in the Redbacks Big Bash Grand Final victory over the NSW Blues, making 62 not out off 39 balls.

In 2012, Borgas became a freelance Twenty20 cricketer and has since played in tournaments in Sri Lanka, New Zealand, Bangladesh, Netherlands, England and Hong Kong as well as in Australia where he has signed a 3-year contract to play for the Sydney Thunder in the Big Bash League.

He also has the unique record of having represented 3 countries, having played for Scotland and Netherlands as their overseas player in the English County one day competition and also for Australia in the Hong Kong Sixes.

Borgas is married to Australian television presenter Alice Monfries.
