= Robert Ovadia =

Australian journalist

Robert Ovadia is an Australian journalist. He previously worked as a reporter and fill-in presenter for Seven News in Sydney.

== Career ==
Ovadia graduated from Hills Grammar School in 1990. He studied Communications and French at Macquarie University, and began his career in regional television in Wagga Wagga. Eighteen months later, he took a senior reporting job in Melbourne with Network 10. In 1999, he took a job with Associated Press in London, while he toured Europe and parts of Asia. Ovadia joined Seven News in 2000, just after the 2000 Olympic Games.

While working with Seven, Ovadia has reported on a range of stories, including the 2002 Sydney bushfire crisis and the Iraq War, before being promoted to Crime Reporter in September 2003.

Ovadia has broken many major stories of statewide and national significance. In 2008, he and colleague Aela Callan won a prestigious Walkley Award for Television News Reporting for breaking the Iguanagate scandal that engulfed the NSW and federal governments.

In 2009, he was the MC at the funeral of the Lin family who were murdered outside their North Epping home in 2009. He was chosen ahead of Nine reporter Jessica Rich. The event was held at Sydney Olympic Park, New South Wales.

From 2011, Ovadia has filled in as a news anchor on various news bulletins, including Seven Morning News and The Morning Show as well as late night news updates. Ovadia is credited as Sydney's crime reporter, and fills predominantly crime and justice related stories. In late 2013, Ovadia won his second Walkley Award for his exposé into an Australian Defence Force sex scandal cover-up.

On 13 December 2013, Ovadia filled in on Today Tonight while regular fill-in presenter Kylie Gillies was on holidays. On 25 December 2013, 2014 and 2015, Ovadia presented the Seven News weeknight bulletin in Sydney.

In October 2019, Ovadia reported having his name circulated and receiving death threats after escorting pro-Beijing actress Celine Ma to safety from a mob of protesters. Ovadia criticised what he saw as the weaponisation of disinformation from Apple Daily, which selectively edited footage of Ma's assault as Ma attempting to instigate violence.

In June 2024, Ovadia was sacked by the Seven Network after allegations of inappropriate conduct involving emails with a former female Seven employee. He subsequently lodged an unfair dismissal claim against Seven and the network’s news boss Anthony De Ceglie. During Ovadia's Federal Court hearing in August, the Seven Network alleged that a further thirteen women had come forward with complaints about Ovadia's conduct. Ovadia claimed in court that "The claims are baseless and Seven has never provided evidence despite repeated requests." Ovadia dropped his legal action against Seven in September 2024.
