= The Hills Grammar School =

Location
- Kenthurst, New South Wales; Australia; 33°41′3″S 151°0′48″E

Information
- Other name: Hills Grammar
- Type: Independent co-educational early learning, primary and secondary day school
- Motto: Strive for excellence
- Denomination: Nonsectarian
- Established: 1982; 44 years ago
- Founder: Ross Booth
- Educational authority: Independent Primary School Heads of Australia
- Chairman: Daby To
- Principal: Karen Yager
- Years: Early learning and K–12
- Colours: Red and green
- Slogan: Strive for Excellence
- Affiliations: Association of Heads of Independent Schools of Australia; Heads of Independent Co-Educational Schools; Junior School Heads Association of Australia
- Website: www.hillsgrammar.nsw.edu.au

The Hills Grammar School (commonly referred to as Hills Grammar) is an independent nonsectarian co-educational early learning, primary and secondary day school, located in Kenthurst, a suburb in the Hills district of Sydney, New South Wales, Australia.

Established in 1982, the school has a non-selective enrolment policy and currently caters for over 1,000 students from early learning, through Kindergarten to Year 12. In 2010, the school opened the Early Childhood Education Centre (ECEC), catering for 3–4 year olds. Main intake years are ECEC, Kindergarten, Year 7, and Year 11; however, if vacancies exist in other years, admissions can be made.

Hills Grammar is affiliated with the Association of Heads of Independent Schools of Australia (AHISA), the Heads of Independent Co-Educational Schools (HICES) and the Junior School Heads Association of Australia (JSHAA).

== History ==
Conceived in the early eighties, plans quickly began to establish a private school founded based on humanitarian values. In order to establish the school, a founding council was established with Ross Booth leading the project. The school opened on 7 February 1983 to 163 students from Kindergarten to Year Nine with 14 teaching staff.

In 2002, an arts and design and technology centre was opened and named after Booth, The Booth Centre. It underwent renovations from 2023 until late 2024.

== Disability discrimination case ==
In 1997, the school became the subject of a landmark Australian civil rights case, Finney v The Hills Grammar School [1999] HREOCA 14.

The parents of a five-year-old girl, Scarlett Finney, who had spina bifida, applied to enrol her into the school's kindergarten class. Although Finney used a wheelchair, she had no intellectual learning difficulties and her family had arranged for outside community nursing support. The school rejected her application, stating it did not possess the adequate resources or facilities to accommodate her physical disability and that her enrolment would impose "unjustifiable hardship" on the institution.

Finney's family challenged the decision under the federal Disability Discrimination Act 1992 (DDA) through the Human Rights and Equal Opportunity Commission (HREOC). In July 1999, Disability Discrimination Commissioner Graeme Innes ruled that the school had unlawfully discriminated against Finney. The commission found that the school's rejection was "based on general and often flawed assumptions" about spina bifida rather than an individualized assessment of her actual needs. Furthermore, the decision established a legal requirement that educational providers must actively consult with parents and medical experts before claiming unjustifiable hardship.

The Hills Grammar School appealed the HREOC ruling to the Federal Court of Australia. In 2000, the Federal Court dismissed the school's application with costs (Hills Grammar School v Human Rights & Equal Opportunity Commission [2000] FCA 658), upholding the anti-discrimination decision. The case set a significant legal precedent in Australia regarding the obligations of non-government, independent schools to provide inclusive education and reasonable accommodations for students with disabilities.

== Notable alumni ==
- Rachael Carpani, actress
- Joel Edgerton, actor, writer, producer
- Nash Edgerton, actor, director, producer
- Delta Goodrem, musician
- Andrew Hansen, comedian
- Alex Hawke, politician
- Michelle Jenneke, athlete
- Robert Ovadia, journalist
- Jhong Hilario, actor, politician

== See also ==
- List of non-government schools in New South Wales
