= The Daily Telegraph (Sydney) =

Australian daily tabloid newspaper

- Cover of The Daily Telegraph (26 May 2016), occupied by a story on David Feeney, during the 2016 federal election campaign
- Type: Daily newspaper
- Format: Tabloid
- Owner(s): Nationwide News (News Corp Australia)
- Editor: Ben English
- Founded: 1879 (as The Daily Telegraph); 1990 (merger with The Daily Mirror as The Daily Telegraph-Mirror); 1996 (as The Daily Telegraph)
- Political alignment: Centre-right
- Headquarters: 2 Holt Street, Surry Hills, Sydney
- Circulation: 280,731 (weekdays); 265,711 (Saturday); (as of 2013–14 financial year)
- Readership: 1,191,000 (weekdays); 909,000 (Saturday)
- Sister newspapers: The Sunday Telegraph
- ISSN: 1836-0203 (print); 2209-0002 (web)
- Website: www.dailytelegraph.com.au

The Daily Telegraph is an Australian tabloid newspaper published by Nationwide News Pty Limited (NWN), a subsidiary of News Corp Australia, itself a subsidiary of News Corp. It is published Monday through Saturday and is available throughout Sydney, across most of regional and remote New South Wales, the Australian Capital Territory and South East Queensland.

A 2013 poll conducted by Essential Research found that The Daily Telegraph was Australia's least-trusted major newspaper, with 49% of respondents citing "a lot of" or "some" trust in the paper. Amongst those ranked by Nielsen, The Daily Telegraph's website is the sixth most popular Australian news website, with a unique monthly audience of 2,841,381 readers.

== History ==
The Daily Telegraph was founded in 1879, by John Mooyart Lynch, a former printer, editor and journalist who had once worked on the Melbourne Daily Telegraph. Lynch had failed in an attempt to become a politician and was looking to start his own paper to reflect the opinion of the common working man. Lynch put together a large team of backers, including an old friend Watkin Wynne, who was unusual for being a very wealthy journalist, and Robert Sands, who ran the printing company John Sands. The first edition was published on 1 July 1879, costing only one penny. The first page of the first edition outlined Lynch's vision for his paper, saying: "We wish to make this journal a reliable exponent of public opinion, which we think is hardly represented in the existing press. Without disparaging existing journals in Sydney, which we fully admit have many excellencies, we believe that they have missed the great objective of journalism to be in sympathy with and to report public opinion."

When sales of the Telegraph began to fall in 1882, the newspaper was taken over by Watkin Wynne. Wynne introduced shorter, punchier, stories and more sensationalism.

The Telegraph reported on various events and movements of the time. The paper was a strong advocate for Federation.

Watkin Wynne remained in charge of the paper until his death in 1921. Under his successors, the paper underwent major changes. In 1924, the paper began running news on the front page rather than just advertising. In 1927, declining circulation and financial troubles forced a switch from the broadsheet format to the smaller tabloid format. In 1929, it was taken over by wealthy tobacco manufacturer Sir Hugh Denison, the founder of the Sydney newspaper The Sun. In 1929, Denison formed Associated Newspapers Ltd (ANL) with S Bennett Ltd and media owner R. C. Packer. Denison later also acquired the Daily Guardian (which had been owned by Smith's Weekly), which he combined with the Telegraph News Pictorial to form the new Daily Telegraph.

The paper returned to a broadsheet format in 1931. From 1936 until its sale to Rupert Murdoch's News Limited in 1972, the Telegraph was owned by Sir Frank Packer's Australian Consolidated Press. Packer sold the Daily Telegraph to Rupert Murdoch's company News Limited in 1972 for $15 million.

In 1990, the Daily Telegraph merged with its afternoon stablemate, The Daily Mirror. The merged entity would resume the name of The Daily Telegraph in January 1996.

== Counterparts ==
On Sundays, its counterpart is The Sunday Telegraph.

Its Melbourne counterparts are the Herald Sun and Sunday Herald Sun. In Brisbane, it is linked with The Courier-Mail and The Sunday Mail; in Adelaide, The Advertiser and Sunday Mail; in Hobart, The Mercury and The Sunday Tasmanian; and in Darwin, The Northern Territory News and Sunday Territorian.

== Political stance ==
Editorially, The Daily Telegraph has traditionally been opposed to the Australian Labor Party, and is often a supporter of the Liberal Party of Australia.

A 2004 Roy Morgan media credibility survey found that 40% of journalists viewed News Limited (exclusive of The Australian) as Australia's most partisan media outlet, ahead of the Australian Broadcasting Corporation on 25%. The survey found that readers took a generally dim view of journalists. In response to the question "Which newspapers do you believe do not accurately and fairly report the news?", the Daily Telegraph came third (9%) behind the Herald Sun (11%) and "All of them" (16%).

At the 2007 Australian federal election, The Daily Telegraph endorsed the Australian Labor Party for the second time. At the 2010 Australian federal election, the newspaper endorsed the Coalition and Tony Abbott. In the 2013 election, the Daily Telegraph ran 177 stories that were "pro-Coalition" and 11 stories that leaned the other way.

=== Endorsements ===
Election	Endorsement
2007	Labor
2010	Coalition
2013	Coalition
2016	Coalition
2019	Coalition
2022	Coalition
2025	Coalition

== Staff ==
=== Editors ===
The Telegraph is edited by Ben English. The previous editor was Christopher Dore. Dore's predecessors are Paul Whittaker, Gary Linnell, David Penberthy, Campbell Reid, David Banks, and Col Allan, who served as editor-in-chief at the News Corporation-owned New York Post from 2001 to 2016.

== Circulation and readership ==
Readership data from Enhanced Media Metrics Australia October 2018 report shows that the Daily Telegraph has total monthly readership of 4,500,000 people via print and digital, compared to 7,429,000 people for its primary competitor, the Sydney Morning Herald.

The Daily Telegraph's weekday print newspaper circulation fell from 310,724 in June 2013 to 221,641 in June 2017. Saturday newspaper circulation fell to 221,996 over the same period.

As of February 2019, third-party web analytics provider Alexa ranked The Daily Telegraph's website as the 343rd most visited website in Australia (down from 90th in July 2015).

== See also ==
- List of newspapers in New South Wales
- List of newspapers in Australia
- List of newspapers in Britain
- List of magazines in Australia
