= Kayo Sports =

Australian sports streaming service

- Company type: Subsidiary
- Website type: Over-the-top media service
- Available in: English
- Headquarters: Gore Hill, New South Wales, {{{location_country}}}
- Area served: Australia
- Owner: Access Industries
- CEO: Hilary Perchard
- Products: Streaming media; Video on demand
- Services: Sports television distribution
- Parent: Hubbl
- Website: kayosports.com.au
- Registration: Required
- Users: ▲1.606 million (June 2024)
- Launched: 26 November 2018; 7 years ago
- Current status: Active

Kayo Sports is an Australian over-the-top video streaming service owned by Hubbl, a subsidiary of Foxtel. Launched in November 2018, the service is oriented towards sports, carrying live and on-demand content from Foxtel's Fox Sports networks, and third-party partners such as ESPN Australia and Racing.com.

== History ==
In March 2018 it was reported Foxtel were investigating an over-the-top sports streaming service to appeal to customers not willing to subscribe to traditional satellite or cable. At the time the service had reportedly been in development for more than nine months but was yet to be green lit. It was reported the new service would not use the Foxtel branding. In August 2018 it was reported Foxtel had green lit this new sports streaming service, which was code named Project Martian. It was predicted the service would launch in late 2018 coinciding with a cricket event following Foxtel's recent new six year broadcasting deal with Cricket Australia.

In October 2018, it was reported the service was originally planned to launch in early November but was delayed until early December in order to conduct further testing to avoid technical issues similar to those experienced by Optus Sport for the 2018 FIFA World Cup. On 5 November 2018 it was reported Foxtel were exploring including ESPN and beIN Sports in the service which was rumored to be called Kayo Sports.

On 9 November 2018, it was announced that the new service would be called Kayo Sports and launched in beta that day. At launch, the service offered over 50 sports from Fox Sports, ESPN and beIN Sports networks live and on demand. Foxtel CEO Patrick Delany described the service as the "Netflix of sport". Following a positive reception to the beta launch, Kayo Sports officially launched on 26 November 2018.

In May 2019, Kayo Sports added Racing.com.

In February 2021, Telstra, part owner of parent company Foxtel, replaced their Telstra Live Pass service in the National Rugby League and Australian Football League mobile apps, which offered streaming of games, with access to Kayo Sports.

In May 2021, Kayo Sports exceeded 1 million total subscribers, with paying subscribers expected to reach that milestone imminently.

In May 2023, it was announced that beIN Sports content would no longer be available on either Foxtel or Kayo Sports platforms from July 2023.

In December 2024, UK-based sports streaming provider DAZN announced its intent to acquire Foxtel for $3.4 billion, in a sale that will include Kayo Sports. In September 2026, DAZN announced that the Fox Sports channels would be rebranded as Kayo Sports in 2027, taking their name from the streaming service.

=== Subscribers ===
Date	Paying subscribers	Total subscribers	Ref
As of February 2019	100,000	115,000	
As of 30 June 2019	331,000	382,000	
As of November 2019	402,000	443,000	
As of 5 February 2020	340,000 (Note: The decline was attributed to it being a "low sports season" in Australia.)		
As of 31 March 2020	404,000	440,000	
As of 2 May 2020	272,000 (Note: The decline was attributed to the impact of the COVID-19 pandemic on sports.)		
As of 30 June 2020	419,000 (Note: The increase was attributed to the return of most major sports.)	465,000	
As of 4 August 2020	542,000	590,000	
As of 31 December 2020	624,000		
As of 31 March 2021	851,000	914,000	
As of 7 May 2021		1,000,000+	
As of 8 August 2022	1,293,000	1,312,000+	
As of 11 August 2023	1,401,000	1,411,000+	
As of 23 June 2024	1,525,000	1,512,000+	

View source data.

== Channels ==
The following channels are available on Kayo Sports:

- Fox Sports News
- Fox Cricket
- Fox League
- Fox Footy
- Fox Netball
- Fox Sports
  - Fox Sports 503
  - Fox Sports 506
  - Fox Sports More+
  - Fox Sports 508
- ESPN
  - ESPN
  - ESPN2
- Racing.com

== Content ==
=== Original programming ===
Kayo Sports' first original program, Below the Bonnet, premiered in March 2021. The weekly Supercars Championship themed talk show is hosted by David Reynolds and Michael Caruso.

== Availability ==
Kayo Sports offers a three tier subscription model, one, basic or premium, the difference being the number of simultaneous device streams. One for one, two for basic, three for premium. Kayo Sports is available via web browser, mobile app (Android and iOS), and on selected smart televisions and media consoles.

=== Kayo Freebies ===
In January 2021 Kayo Sports started offering free access to selected sports and programs under the banner Kayo Freebies as a way of increasing subscribers. Sports included under the banner include: the Mount Panorama 500, selected A-League games, selected W-League games, two Suncorp Super Netball games a round plus Australian Diamonds games, and all sports supported under the Federal Government's Women's, Niche and Other Under-Represented Sports grants.

== See also ==
- Foxtel Now
- Binge
- List of sports television channels
- List of streaming media services
