= Do You Want to Live Forever? =

2024 Australian medical documentary series

- Genre: factual television television documentary
- Presented by: Nick Coatsworth; Tracy Grimshaw
- Country of origin: Australia
- Original language: English
- No. of seasons: 1
- No. of episodes: 4

Production
- Executive producers: Ashley Davies; David Galloway; Leonie Lowe
- Running time: 49–61 minutes
- Production company: Lune Media

Original release
- Network: Nine Network
- Release: 17 June – 8 July 2024

Do You Want to Live Forever? is an Australian medical documentary series on the Nine Network, which debuted on 17 June 2024.

== Summary ==
Do You Want to Live Forever? was announced at Nine's upfronts in September 2023, and is hosted by journalist Tracy Grimshaw, who was announced to host in January 2024 and medical expert Dr Nick Coatsworth. The series follows four pairs of everyday Australians undergoing medically supervised trials alongside interventions for health to reduce their biological age and provides clues to help people to live longer.

The series is a four-part series and is produced by Lune Media, with Ashley Davies, David Galloway and Leonie Lowe as executive producers.

== Participants ==
Names	Notability/job	Ages	Beginning biological ages	Final biological ages	State
Eliza and Liberty Paschke	Former contestants from The Block.	38; 35	42; 33	34; 29	Victoria
Duncan Armstrong; Tom Bruce	Former Olympic swimmer Construction manager	55; 32	62; 38	56; 28	Queensland; New South Wales
Luke Williamson; Taylor Hague	Construction worker Hair salon owner	28	31; 35	27	Victoria
Enver Scott; Eliana Scott	Family man Regional manager for a makeup and skincare company	51; 57	61; 68	51; 56	New South Wales

== Release ==
Do You Want to Live Forever? debuted on the Nine Network on 17 June 2024, and the finale aired on 8 July 2024.

== Ratings ==
Ep no.	Air date	Timeslot	National reach viewers (millions)	National total viewers (millions)	Night rank	Source
1	17 June 2024	Monday 7:30 pm	1.726	0.728	3	
2	24 June 2024	Monday 7:30 pm	1.497	0.676	6	
3	1 July 2024	Monday 7:30 pm	1.553	0.637	4	
4	8 July 2024	Monday 7:30 pm	1.607	0.649	4	

== Awards ==
Year	Award	Category	Result	Ref.
2025	TV Week Logies	Best Lifestyle Program	Nominated	
