= Nick Coatsworth =

Australian doctor and TV presenter

Nick Coatsworth is an Australian infectious diseases expert. He was Australia's deputy chief medical officer during the early years of the COVID-19 pandemic, when he regularly appeared in print and on radio and television to provide the public with information.

He is Nine Network's medical expert and presents the television show Do You Want to Live Forever? with Tracy Grimshaw.

== Education ==
Coatsworth was educated at Wesley College in South Perth which he attended between 1985 and 1995. At Wesley he was awarded the Philip Goatcher Scholarship for Years 11 and 12. He also spent five years on the school's debating team which he believes helped to prepare him for communicating with the public.

He attended the University of Western Australia. He graduated with Honours in 2001. In 2022 the university awarded him an Honorary Doctorate for services to medicine. He has a Masters in International Public Health from the University of Sydney.

== Medical career ==
Coatsworth is a Fellow of the Royal Australasian College of Physicians. His specialties are respiratory medicine and infectious diseases. He is currently director of infectious diseases at Canberra Hospital.

His other roles have included executive director at the National Critical Care and Trauma Response Centre in Darwin. He has also lectured in medicine at the Australian National University.

Coatsworth led humanitarian teams in the Congo and the Darfur region of Sudan for Medicins Sans Frontiers when he was 25, a task that he says left him with PTSD. He told the Today programme: "I think everyone has their limits in life and I kind of reached that, the security situation there was really difficult. There was the threat of assassination of people in the place where we were." After returning home, Coatsworth became anxious: "I felt like I was having these heart palpitations ... At the end of 2019 it got to the point one weekend I couldn't leave the house." He took anxiety medication to resolve the issue.

He was elected to the board of Medicins Sans Frontiers in Australia in 2008. He served as the board's president in 2010 and 2011.

He also led the second Australian Medical Assistance Team to the Philippines after Typhoon Haiyan in 2013.

His other deployments with the Australian Medical Assistance Team include Vanuatu after Cyclone Pam in 2015 and Fiji following Cyclone Winston in 2016.

In 2023, Coatsworth joined Patients Australia as Ambassador for Health Reform.

In 2024, Coatsworth became a clinical governance advisor for GP telehealth company Eucalyptus.

== During the COVID-19 Lockdown Period ==
In 2020, during the early stages of the COVID-19 pandemic, Coatsworth was appointed as Australia's Deputy Chief Medical Officer. As the only hospital-based practising clinician in the team of deputies, his role initially involved dealing with hospitals and health services.

However, Coatsworth became one of the government's key public-facing experts, appearing regularly in press conferences and on television programmes to talk about the virus. This led to him being labelled a 'household name' by the media.

He was appointed by Australia's then top health adviser Brendan Murphy one of three deputy chief medical officers.

Coatsworth has been outspoken about elements of how Australia handled COVID-19. His positions include:

- Australians did not require a fourth vaccine shot and that he would not be having one.
- Lockdown restrictions went on for too long.
- Promises to eradicate the virus in its early stages were misguided.

== Media work ==
Coatsworth has written opinion pieces for publications including:

- The Sydney Morning Herald
- The Australian Financial Review
- The Australian

=== Television ===
Coatsworth is Nine Network's Medical Expert appearing regularly as a guest on Nine Network programmes.

He is presenter of a Nine Network television show he created, Do You Want To Live Forever? which he hosts with Tracey Grimshaw.

He has been a guest on multiple television programs including:

- The Kenny Report on Sky News Australia
- Sky News on Sky News Australia
- Today on the Nine Network
- 7.30 on ABC TV
- Sunrise on Seven Network
- The Project on Network 10
- A Current Affair on Nine Network
- Q+A on ABC TV
- ABC News on ABC News

In 2021 he starred in television adverts on behalf of the Australian government about COVID-19 vaccinations.

In 2023 Coatsworth filled in as presenter of Today while regular host Karl Stefanovic took Christmas leave. His appointment left "plenty of noses out of joint" due to his perceived inexperience.

=== Other platforms ===
He has also been interviewed on radio and for podcasts

== Personal life ==
Coatsworth is married to Dr Rebecca Pearson, a lung transplant physician. They have three children.

He has lived in Canberra since 2016.
