= The Jury (Australian TV program) =

2024 discussion panel show

- Genre: Panel discussion
- Presented by: Danica De Giorgio
- Country of origin: Australia
- Original language: English
- No. of series: 1
- No. of episodes: 10

Production
- Production locations: Sydney, Australia
- Camera setup: Multi-camera
- Running time: 50 minutes
- Production companies: Gravity Media; Australian News Channel

Original release
- Network: Sky News Australia
- Release: 4 February 2024 – present

The Jury is an Australian television panel discussion program, hosted by Danica De Giorgio and broadcast on Sky News Australia. Airing weekly, the program premiered on 4 February 2024, with a scheduled duration of ten weeks.

== Format ==
Hosted and moderated by Danica De Giorgio, the program, which airs at 8:00 pm on Sundays, features two guest debaters who discuss current news items and plead their cases to a twelve-member jury, made up of members of the public, who vote on whose argument was the most convincing. Topics of discussion include the Australian economy, nuclear power, gender identity, the monarchy, immigration, and the NDIS.

== Production ==
The program is co-produced by Gravity Media and Australian News Channel, at The Production Centre in Sydney.

Prior to the program airing, Mark Calvert, head of programs at Australian News Channel, explained that his company "couldn't be more excited to work with the professionals at Gravity Media. Their creativity and commitment have made a real difference to this new format." He continued: "We can't wait to share the program with our viewers." Similarly, Mike Purcell, head of production at Gravity Media, said that: "We are delighted to be working with Mark Calvert and the team from Australian News Channel on the production of this new program. We appreciate their decision to select Gravity Media Australia to work with them in delivering the complete studio television production of The Jury."

Following the airing of the first episode, host De Giorgio explained that "the topics we choose are newsworthy and what people are talking about right now".

=== Future ===
In April 2024, it was confirmed that The Jury would return for a second series "at a later date".

== Panellists ==
Notable guests have included Barnaby Joyce, Dick Smith, Jacinta Price and David Shoebridge.

== Criticism ==
Prior to the airing of the program's third episode on 18 February 2024, The Guardian noted that, owing to Sky News Australia's right-wing evening programming and its relationship with the Australian Broadcasting Corporation, it would be difficult to persuade a panellist from the ABC to participate in the program, especially since that week's topic related to whether Australia needed a public broadcaster.
