= Hubbl =

Australian streaming service company

- Formerly: Streamotion (2018–2024)
- Industry: Streaming media, Video on demand
- Founded: 26 November 2018
- Headquarters: Gore Hill, New South Wales
- Area served: Australia
- Key people: Julian Ogrin (CEO)
- Products: Binge, Kayo Sports, WatchAFL, WatchNRL
- Parent: Foxtel
- Website: www.hubbl.com.au

Logo as Streamotion (2018–2024)

Hubbl, previously Streamotion, is an Australian over-the-top streaming subscription provider, wholly owned by Foxtel. The company has developed and operates the local streaming services Kayo Sports, Binge, Flash and Lifestyle, as well as operating the WatchAFL and WatchNRL services in international markets.

In 2022, Foxtel announced their development of a television operating system known internally as Project Magneto, based on the Sky Stream box available in the UK. In October 2023, the service was formally revealed under the name Hubbl, which aims to bring content from both free-to-air providers and paid subscription services into a single user interface.

The platform can be accessed via two products; the Hubbl puck, an external digital media player which can be connected to compatible television sets and the Hubbl Glass, a 4K LED Smart-TV with a built-in soundbar and the Hubbl service already integrated into the device. Both of those products began to be on sale on 10 March 2024 via Hubbl's website as well as JB Hi-Fi and Harvey Norman retail stores. Hubbl also acts as a unified billing service for streaming subscriptions, with Streamotion moving their billing operations exclusively to the service.

In September 2025, Foxtel announced that both Hubbl products would be entering "maintenance mode" and would no longer receive marketing support. Two months later, Hubbl announced they would no longer offer the ability to subscribe to third-party services through their billing platform, as well as the discontinuation of their 'Stack & Save' program.

Hubbl's streaming services have grown to become Foxtel's fastest growing business sector, with streaming users comprising two-thirds of the company's customer base.

== Services ==
=== Kayo Sports ===
Kayo Sports, codenamed Project Martian during development, is Hubbl's subscription streaming service for its sports content. The service was launched in November 2018 and offers both live streams and highlights packages from Fox Sports as well as ESPN, beIN Sports and Racing.com. In addition to this, a multiscreen feature is also available, allowing subscribers to view multiple live events simultaneously.

=== Binge ===
Binge, codenamed Project Jupiter during development, is Hubbl's entertainment focused streaming service that was launched on 25 May 2020. Set up to compete with the likes of Disney+, Netflix, Amazon Prime Video and Stan, the service features content from major networks and studios including HBO, Warner Bros, Paramount Global, Sony Pictures, Universal Pictures, FX (even though it has already begun losing its titles to Disney+) and the BBC. The service also features a selection of live streamed linear Foxtel cable networks including Foxtel One, LifeStyle, Arena and BBC First.

=== Flash ===
Flash News was Hubbl's news aggregation OTT platform that was launched on 14 October 2021. The service offers live news coverage from major linear cable networks including News24, Sky News UK, CNN, BBC News, and Fox News. In 2023, Foxtel shuttered the service's editorial team, bringing an end to daily original content on the platform.

In December 2025, Foxtel announced they would be winding down the Flash and Lifestyle platforms, with their respective content to be merged into Binge. Both services ended service February 2026.

=== LifeStyle ===
LifeStyle was a streaming service which distributes non-fiction content from Foxtel's LifeStyle group of networks, launched alongside the Hubbl platform.
