= Sunday newspaper =

Current affairs publication issued on a Sunday

A Sunday newspaper is a current affairs publication issued on Sundays. In the United Kingdom, eleven Sunday-only weekly newspapers are distributed nationally. Many daily newspapers, traditionally publishing only from Monday to Saturday, now have Sunday editions, usually with a related name (e.g. The Times and The Sunday Times), that are editorially distinct.

== History ==
The first Sunday paper was Elizabeth Johnson's British Gazette and Sunday Monitor, which launched in 1779 and ceased publication on 22 September 1805. It contained a summary of the week's news and a religious column.

The Observer was first published on 4 December 1791.

By the 1930s, "almost everyone" in the British population read a newspaper on Sundays.

The Mail on Sunday launched in 1982. The Independent on Sunday launched in 1990.
