= Gamify (TV series) =

- The Gamify logo as of its premiere in 2019, with host Jesse Baird.
- Genre: Children's television
- Created by: Drew Jarvis
- Presented by: Jesse Baird
- Starring: Emily Dickson; Jack Kelly; Brooke Marsden; Stacey Thomson
- Country of origin: Australia
- Original language: English
- No. of seasons: 1
- No. of episodes: 65

Production
- Executive producer: Drew Jarvis
- Producers: Jane Adcroft; Arika Crotty; Claire Middleton
- Production locations: Brisbane, Queensland, Australia
- Editors: David Beard; Ben Guest; Taylor Suleau
- Camera setup: Multi-camera
- Running time: 30 minutes (inc. adverts)

Original release
- Network: 10 Peach
- Release: 22 January – 21 September 2019

Gamify is an Australian children's TV program which airs on 10 Peach on Network 10. It was hosted by Jesse Baird (J.B.) and premiered on 22 February 2019 on 10 Peach at 8 am. The show follows three 12–14 year old teen adventurers, who are picked by the Global Expedition Organisation (GEO) to engage in a mission.

They must complete many action-packed, real-world adventure challenges to beat the game to win a prize, which have included an Event Cinemas ticket for the group, vouchers to iPlay Adventure Australia, gift cards for EB Games Australia, Kingpin Bowling or Urban Xtreme and special game prize packs from uGames Australia. The participants must help GEO in their fight against the HAVOC Organisation (also known as Anarchy Labs) by completing the 3 different challenges and ranking as high as possible.

== Series overview ==
Series	Episodes	Originally released	
Series	Episodes	First released	Last released
1	65	22 February 2019	21 September 2019

== Broadcast History ==
- From 22 February 2019 – 2020, the show aired on 10 Peach from Friday–Sunday, at 8 am on Fridays, 8:30 am on Saturdays and at 10:30 am on Sundays.

== Cast ==
- Jesse Baird as host, known as J.B.
- Emily Dickson as Vicki Volt, Arcadia Steele, Agent Storm, Eve Doom & Elizah Wolf
- Jack Kelly as CJ Clamp, Dr Niles Ice, Bruce Bass & Agent 19
- Brooke Marsden as Magenta Crowe, Sandra Stone & Zero
- Stacey Thomson as Savannah Hart
- Elizah Caruana as Penelope Fox
