= Anthony De Ceglie =

Western Australian journalist and newspaper editor

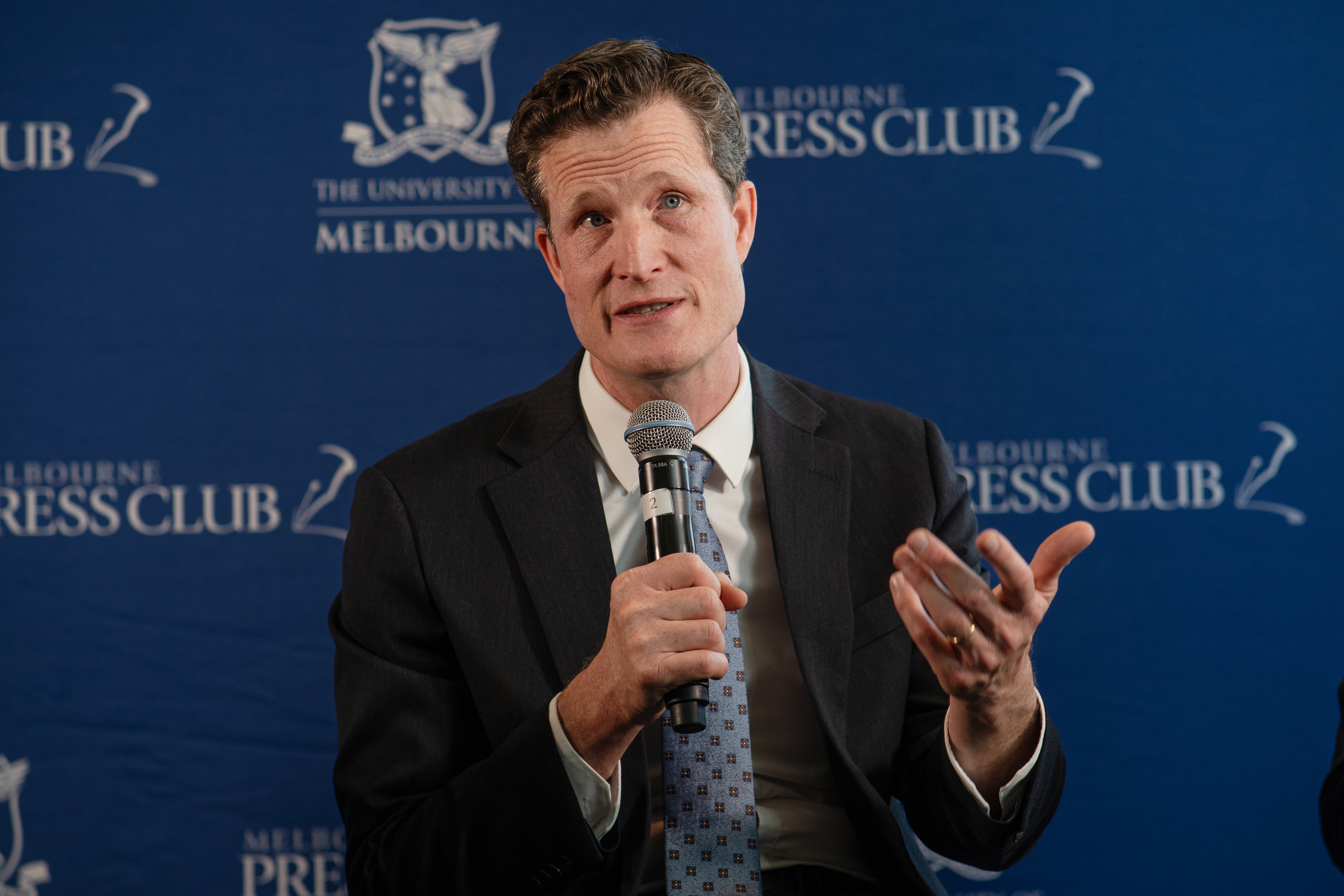
- De Ceglie at the Melbourne Press Club in October 2024

21st Editor of The West Australian
- In office January 2019 – April 2024
- Preceded by: Brett McCarthy

Personal details
- Citizenship: Australia
- Profession: Journalist
- Awards: Walkley Award (3)

Anthony De Ceglie is an Australian journalist.

From May 2025 to October 2026, he was chief executive of NRL expansion club the Perth Bears.

De Ceglie has previously been Seven West Media's director of news and current affairs, and editor-in-chief of West Australian Newspapers.

== Career ==
De Ceglie' first job in journalism was at The Collie Mail in Collie, Western Australia. He later served as the deputy editor of the Sydney based Daily Telegraph from March 2016, as well as serving as Deputy Editor at the Sunday Times and its web portal PerthNow.

He was editor-in-chief of West Australian Newspapers (including The West Australian) from January 2019 to April 2024.

From March 2020 to 2021, during his tenure, it increased its weekday readership by 14%, and its Sunday readership by 28%, though some have argued that it has gone in a more tabloid direction under his leadership, and the staff has been reduced.

In April 2024, De Caglie was appointed Seven West Media's director of news and current affairs and editor-in-chief.

In May 2025, De Ceglie was appointed chief executive of NRL expansion club the Perth Bears. Ray Kuka has been announced as De Ceglie replacement as Seven West Media's director of news and current affairs and editor-in-chief.

== Awards and accolades ==
In 2020, De Ceglie won a Walkley Award for Headline, Caption or Hook, in the category of all media, for his "You only had one JobKeeper" line. Prior to this, he had already received two Walkleys. Additionally, he serves as a trustee of the Channel 7 Telethon trust, a charitable organisation owned by Seven West Media (which also in turn owns WAN).
