= Chris Dore =

Australian journalist

Christopher Dore is an Australian journalist, currently the editor-in-chief of The Nightly and editor-in-chief of The West Australian from May 2024. He was previously the editor-in-chief of The Australian from October 2018 until 16 November 2022, when he resigned after making lewd comments towards women. He was formerly the editor of The Daily Telegraph, The Courier-Mail, The Sunday Times, and deputy editor of The Sunday Telegraph and The Australian.

Dore is a Walkley Award winning journalist. During his time as editor, The Courier-Mail was also awarded the PANPA newspaper of the year.

Under Dore's leadership at The Australian, subscriber numbers to print and digital editions more than doubled, from 136,000 in 2018 to almost 277,000 in 2022. He was renowned for producing outrageous front pages during his stints at The Courier-Mail and The Daily Telegraph. He lost his job at News Corp after making lewd comments towards women at the WSJ Tech Live event in California. At the time of his resignation, Dore claimed it was due to "personal health issues".

Dore was born in Brisbane, Queensland, and studied economics and politics at the University of Adelaide. He began his career at The Australian, where he held several roles, including deputy editor, Victorian editor, night editor, New Zealand-based Pacific correspondent, and political correspondent in the Canberra Press Gallery.

The West Australian under Dore has been criticised by ABC program Media Watch for providing unduly favourable coverage of Liberal candidate Basil Zempilas, who is also a former employee of Seven West Media, during the 2025 Western Australian state election, and for its unfavourable coverage of the Perth Bears National Rugby League team, due to Channel 7 having the right to broadcast the NRL's main competitor, the Australian Football League.
