= Jesse Baird =

Australian television presenter and umpire (1997–2024)

- Baird in December 2019
- Born: Jesse Alan Baird; 4 September 1997; Melbourne, Victoria, Australia
- Died: 19 February 2024 (aged 26); Paddington, New South Wales, Australia
- Body discovered: Bungonia, New South Wales, Australia
- Other name: J.B.
- Education: La Trobe University
- Occupations: Television presenter; umpire
- Years active: 2017–2024
- Television: Totally Wild; Gamify; Studio 10
- Partner: Luke Davies (2024)
Australian rules football career
Umpiring career
Years	League	Role	Games
2011–2016	NFNL	Goal umpire	
2017–2019	NEAFL	Goal umpire	
2020–2023	AFL	Goal umpire	62
Career highlights
- 2018 NEAFL Grand Final; 2019 NEAFL Grand Final

Jesse Alan Baird (4 September 1997 – 19 February 2024) was an Australian television presenter and Australian rules football goal umpire. Baird worked as a presenter and reporter on various Network 10 programs, including Totally Wild, Gamify and Studio 10. He officiated 62 matches as an Australian Football League umpire, including two finals.

Baird was shot dead on the morning of 19 February 2024, alongside his partner. Former police officer Beau Lamarre-Condon was implicated in his killing. His remains were discovered on 27 February.

== Early life ==
Baird was born in Melbourne, where he grew up in the north-eastern suburbs. He graduated from Loyola College in 2015, then achieved a Bachelor of Education degree from La Trobe University in 2019, majoring in drama and media. He moved to Brisbane in early 2017 to pursue a television career. He moved to Sydney in 2023 for further producing and umpiring work.

== Television career ==
Baird worked as a presenter and reporter on various Network 10 programs. In early 2017, he joined the cast of children's television series Totally Wild, remaining as a presenter alongside Stacey Thomson, until the show's final episode on 27 June 2021. In 2019, Baird was announced as the host of Gamify, a game show which aired on 10 Peach. He was also a red carpet reporter on Studio 10, until the program was cancelled in December 2023.

== Umpiring career ==
Baird became an Australian rules football goal umpire in 2011 with the Northern Football Netball League, winning the NFNL's Most Improved Senior Umpire award and officiating the Division 1 Grand Final in 2015. Baird moved to Brisbane in 2017 where he joined the NEAFL, umpiring grand finals in 2018 and 2019. In 2019, he was named the NEAFL Goal Umpire of the Year. In 2020, he joined the Australian Football League (AFL) list. He made his AFL debut officiating a match between Gold Coast and Port Adelaide.

Baird won the Brian Pratt Medallion for most promising AFL umpire in 2020 and 2021. His fiftieth game came in round six of the 2023 season. He officiated 62 matches as an AFL umpire, including two finals.

== Disappearance and death ==
Baird and his partner Luke Davies, aged 29, were last seen on the evening of 18 February 2024. Baird was scheduled to umpire an AFL pre-season practice match between Sydney and Greater Western Sydney on 20 February. However, he did not arrive.

On 21 February, bloodied clothes, a phone, credit cards, keys, and an $8,000 watch belonging to Davies were found in a skip in Cronulla. Police subsequently attended Baird's home in Paddington where they found upended furniture, a large quantity of blood, and a projectile and casing that allegedly matched a police firearm.

Police alleged Baird and Davies were killed on the morning of 19 February. Shouting and gunshots were heard from the residence, and a 000 emergency phone call was made on Davies' phone, in which the operator heard a man shouting "get out, get out" before the call was disconnected. A police car was dispatched but drove down the street without stopping at Baird's house.

On 23 February, New South Wales police officer Senior Constable Beaumont Lamarre-Condon, aged 28 and known as Beau Lamarre, handed himself in to Bondi Police Station and was charged with two counts of murder. Investigators allege Lamarre's crimes followed months of "predatory behaviour” towards Baird, with whom witnesses report Lamarre had falsely claimed to be in a relationship. Lamarre was remanded in custody to appear in court in late April. Lamarre purchased two surfboard bags, the same type in which the victims' bodies were later found; one on 17 February two days before the killings and one on the afternoon of 19 February. He rented a white Toyota HiAce van from Mascot at 9:30 pm on 19 February. It was seen in Lambton on 22 February before being abandoned in Grays Point. Police alleged that the van was used to transport the bodies of Baird and Davies.

On 27 February, Baird and Davies' bodies were found on a property in Bungonia, New South Wales, near Goulburn, following information from the accused.

In October 2025 Lamarre pleaded not guilty to the charge, with the trial set for September 2026. On 29 April 2026, Lamarre's mother Coleen was charged with an act to pervert the course of justice for allegedly attempting to influence a key witness to change their evidence.

== See also ==
- List of solved missing person cases (2020s)
- List of sports officials who died while active
