= Tracy Grimshaw =

Australian journalist and television presenter (born 1960)

- Born: 3 June 1960 (age 66); Melbourne, Victoria, Australia
- Occupations: Journalist; Television presenter
- Years active: 1978–2024; 2026-
- Television: Nine News reporter and presenter (1981–?); The Midday Show as host; Today as co-host (1996–2005) A Current Affair (2006–2022)

Tracy Grimshaw (born 3 June 1960) is an Australian former journalist and television presenter.

Grimshaw is best known for her work with the Nine Network where she was the host of A Current Affair from 2006 to 2022 and the co-host of Today from 1996 until 2005.

Grimshaw returned to the network in 2024 to host a new medical program, Do You Want to Live Forever?

== Biography ==
Grimshaw grew up in Greensborough, Victoria.

Grimshaw's career began in 1981 when she joined Nine News in Melbourne as a reporter. In 1985 she began presenting news bulletins and by 1987 had been appointed the presenter of Nine Morning News.

In 1995, Grimshaw appeared as co-host of The Midday Show with David Reyne. The following year she was host of Today on Saturday and Animal Hospital.

On 4 November 1996, Grimshaw was appointed the co-host of Today with Steve Liebmann, a position she held for nine years. She finished her role as co-host of Today on 23 December 2005 and was replaced by Jessica Rowe.

In 2005, Grimshaw played the news reporter character Katie Current in the Australian cinema and DVD release of Shark Tale (the original lines were provided by American journalist Katie Couric).

On 30 January 2006, Grimshaw began presenting A Current Affair, replacing Ray Martin. In May 2006, she interviewed Beaconsfield Mine collapse survivors Todd Russell and Brant Webb in a special two-hour presentation called The Great Escape. Grimshaw was a nominee for the Gold Logie in 2018. On 5 September 2022, Grimshaw announced that she would step down as host of A Current Affair on 24 November 2022 after 17 years.

The Nine Network announced in September 2023 that Grimshaw would be returning to the network in 2024. On 19 January 2024, at a Nine media event in Melbourne, she was announced as the host of a new medical series, Do You Want to Live Forever?, alongside medical expert Nick Coatsworth, which premiered on 17 June 2024.
