= Every Family Has A Secret =

Australian television series

Every Family Has A Secret is an Australian television documentary reality genealogy series, presented by Noni Hazlehurst. It is an observational documentary series which follows Australians seeking out the hidden secrets within their families which can be a life changing journey.

== Episodes ==
=== Season One (2019) ===
No. In season	Subject	Airdate
1	Angela Hamilton, David Field	25 June 2019
2	Li Ying Andrews, Marie-Anne Keeffe	2 July 2019
3	Lance Innes, Michelle White	9 July 2019

=== Season Two (2020) ===
No. In season	Subject	Airdate
1	Ellis Treleaven, Marie O’Connor	22 September 2020
2	Matthieu Heimel, Kerry Stevenson	29 September 2020
3	Elizabeth Brierley, Paul Morris	6 October 2020
