= Couple to Throuple =

American reality television show

- Genre: Reality show
- Country of origin: America
- Original language: English
- No. of seasons: 1
- No. of episodes: 10

Production
- Production company: Naked

Original release
- Network: Peacock

Couple to Throuple is an American reality television show. It involves romantic couples experimenting with polyamory. It is hosted by Scott Evans and streams on Peacock. The show follows four couples living in a house and a group of single individuals. The couples invite one of the single individuals to join their relationship, and throughout the series the couples can choose to remain with their third member or select a new single person.
