= Alice Monfries =

Australian journalist

- Born: 13 February 1987 (age 39)
- Education: University of South Australia
- Occupations: News presenter and journalist
- Years active: 2010–present
- Employer: Nine Network
- Television: Nine News reporter
- Spouse: Cameron Borgas
- Children: 1
- Awards: Broadcaster of the Year 2016

Alice Monfries (born 13 February 1987) is an Australian journalist and news presenter for the Nine Network in Adelaide.

== Career ==
Monfries studied journalism at the University of South Australia and began her career at Messenger Newspapers, where she was recognised by the SA Press Club as the Best Up and Coming Journalist in 2010.

In 2011, she moved to the Sunday Mail, and in 2012 was named South Australian Young Journalist of the Year.

Later that year she moved to Network Ten Australia, where she worked as a reporter for Adelaide's Ten Eyewitness News and filled in as Weather Presenter.

In 2014, Monfries moved to the Nine Network as reporter for Nine News Adelaide. She began presenting Nine Adelaide's Afternoon News bulletin in 2016 and the same year was named Broadcaster of the Year by the SA Press Club.

In 2017, she was announced as co-presenter of the new afternoon bulletin Nine Live Adelaide and began filling in for Will McDonald on Nine Adelaide's Weekend bulletin.

On 31 October 2017, Monfries reported from New York on the New York City truck attack after narrowly avoiding the terror attack while holidaying in the city.

In 2018, she moved to Sydney and began reporting for Nine News Sydney and the Today Show, and filling in as presenter on Nine News Early Edition, Nine's Afternoon News and Weekend Today.

In July 2018, she led the network's coverage of the Tham Luang cave rescue in Thailand, also filing for TVNZ and radio stations across Australia. In the moments after the final boy was rescued, she interviewed a member of the rescue team who broke into song, singing John Lennon's Imagine. The footage went viral around the world.

== Personal life ==
Monfries is married to former professional cricketer Cameron Borgas.

In August 2019, she gave birth to their son.

Monfries is an ambassador for the Leukaemia Foundation, hosting their flagship Light the Night events in Sydney. She is also an ambassador for the RSPCA and the Women's and Children's Hospital.
