= 10 Sport =

Sport division of Network 10 in Australia

- Network: Network 10; Paramount+
- Launched: 1965
- Country of origin: Australia
- Owner: Network Ten Pty Limited (Warner Bros. Discovery Asia-Pacific)
- Headquarters: Pyrmont, New South Wales
- Major broadcasting contracts: A-League Men; A-League Women; AFC Asian Cup; Australia Cup; Formula One; MotoGP; Matildas Internationals; Socceroos Internationals; Ultimate Fighting Championship
- Formerly known as: Ten Sport (1983–1984, 1991–1992, 1996–2018); Ten Sports (1985–1986); Ten Action Sports (1986–1991); Ten's World of Sport (1992–1996)
- Sister network: Network 10; 10 Drama; Gecko TV; 10
- Official website: 10.com.au/sport

10 Sport is the brand that all sporting events broadcast on Network 10, an Australian free-to-air commercial television network. Sports streamed on Paramount+ in Australia since August 2021 are also broadcast under the 10 Sport banner.

All sport events were broadcast under the One HD banner from 26 March 2009 until it ceased being a sole sports channel in early 2011.

== History ==
=== Australian rules ===
In 2002, Ten combined with the Nine Network to acquire free-to-air broadcast rights for the AFL, the elite Australian rules competition, displacing the Seven Network which had held the rights for more than 40 years. Ten broadcast Saturday afternoon and Saturday night games and had exclusive rights for all finals games, the network also alternated in showing the pre-season Grand Final and Brownlow Medal count with Nine (Ten telecasted the events in 2002, 2004 and 2006) while they showed each local state team's games that were played by WA, SA, QLD and NSW teams that were played on a Saturday. Along with the Seven Network, Ten placed a successful $780 million bid to jointly broadcast the game from 2007 to 2011. Under this deal, Ten continued to broadcast the Saturday component of the competition. However, unlike the previous deal, Ten did not hold the exclusive rights to the finals series. Instead, the networks shared the broadcasting of the finals series and alternated the broadcast of the grand final. In the years when Ten did not televise the Grand Final (2008 and 2010), it telecast the Brownlow Medal presentation and the Nab Cup Grand Final. Ten ended AFL broadcasting at the conclusion of the 2011 season. At the end of 2011, Network Ten lost the rights to the AFL with Seven taking over the free-to-air TV Saturday games. Ten Sport won a Logie Award for "Most Popular Sport Program" at the 2012 TV Week Logie Awards for its telecast of the 2011 AFL Grand Final which was the last to be broadcast.

=== Basketball ===
In 1992, Network 10 also used to air the National Basketball League (NBL) during the middle of the basketball boom in Australia from 1992 to 1997, but after delegating games to extremely late night time slots the network eventually ended its broadcasting. In March 2010 however, it was announced that Network 10 and digital channel One would show NBL games for the next 5 years. Starting with 2 games per week, and raising to 5 per week in the 2014/15 season. The network also screened Boomers and Opals games. On the 19 August 2021, The NBL and Channel 10 announced a broadcast deal that would involve showing two games every Sunday. One on the main channel (Network 10) and the other on the secondary channel (10 Bold), starting with the 2021/22 Season.

=== Cricket ===
In 2013, Ten paid $100 million for exclusive rights to broadcast the Big Bash League from 2013 to 2018, marking the channel's first foray in elite domestic cricket coverage. Ten previously held the broadcast rights to the Indian Premier League.

=== Football ===
Network 10 in 2007 broadcast its first football broadcast with the Sydney FC v LA Galaxy exhibition match. The match was broadcast on the main channel nationally in a three-hour special presentation. In 2017, Ten entered a two-year deal becoming the FTA broadcaster of the A-League and Socceroos matches. 27 matches played on Saturday Nights were simulcasted from Fox Sports on 10 Drama along with five finals matches and Socceroos matches over the two-year period. Fox on One was a three-hour programming block produced by Fox Sports for Network 10 each Saturday night on 10 Drama. It included Back Page Live followed by the live broadcast of the Saturday Night A-League match.

In 2021, Network 10 returned broadcasting football acquiring full broadcast rights become the home of Australian Football in a five-year deal. One A-League match each Saturday night will be broadcast on the main channel along with one W-League match each Sunday on 10 Drama. All A-League and W-League finals will also be broadcast live and free on FTA. All remainder matches will be streamed on Paramount+. A separate four-year deal was also struck with Football Australia with all Socceroos and Matildas matches to be broadcast on FTA along with for the first time, the FFA Cup Final. Other FFA Cup matches will be streamed on Paramount+. Other content also acquired which will be shown on Network 10 platforms including Under 23 friendlies, Youth national team home matches along with AFC competitions. 10 and Paramount+ also became the official broadcaster of the FA Cup.

In May 2026, The A-Leagues are staying on Network 10 and Paramount+ for a further three years. One Isuzu UTE A-League Men’s match per week will be broadcast live and free-to-air on Network 10, with marquee games broadcast on Network 10’s primary channel, 10. With all matches broadcast live on Paramount+. All Ninja A-League Women’s matches will be available live on Paramount+, with every game also broadcast live and free on 10 Streaming. The partnership also includes ten women’s matches shown live and free-to-air on 10 Drama each season, including the Grand Final.

=== Horse racing ===
Network 10 broadcast the Melbourne Cup between 1978 and 2001, and again from 2019 to 2023. For a brief period in 2019 before the Melbourne Cup, Network 10 also broadcast some International Racing meets from the United Kingdom and France.

=== Motorsport ===
Ten has been a long-standing broadcaster of motorsport events. It has produced the motoring show RPM to complement its coverage.

In 2003, Ten started broadcasting the Formula One World Championship after the Nine Network dropped the rights in 2002 after 22 years of coverage. Other series broadcast include the Supercars Championship from 1997 to 2006 and 2015 to 2020 and MotoGP since 1997.

On 30 September 2017, 10 has dropped its remaining Formula One international live races; it retained the broadcast rights of Formula One Australian Grand Prix live races and rest of highlights from international races of Formula One World Championship.

=== Rugby league ===
Ten broadcast the New South Wales Rugby League premiership from 1983 until 1991. The network was experiencing severe financial problems in the early 1990s, and it was the New South Wales Rugby League that successfully applied to place the network in liquidation in 1991.

=== Rugby union ===
Network 10 has broadcast the 1995, 2007 and 2019 Rugby World Cups. From 2013 to 2020, 10 broadcast Wallabies test matches played in Australia and Rugby Championship matches involving the Wallabies.

=== Olympic and Commonwealth Games ===
Ten broadcast both the summer and winter Olympics in 1984 and 1988. Network 10 acquired broadcast rights to the 2014 Winter Olympics for $20 million after all three major commercial networks pulled out of bidding on rights to both the 2014 and 2016 Olympic Games due to cost concerns. The Nine Network had lost $22 million on its joint coverage of the 2012 Games with Foxtel, and the Seven Network's bid was rejected for being lower than what Nine/Foxtel had previously paid.

Network 10, in joint partnership with subscription television provider Foxtel, had broadcast rights for the 2010 Commonwealth Games. It also broadcast the 1994 and 2014 games. Channel 10 won praise for their broadcast of the Olympics and Commonwealth Games with many Australians hoping they return to 10 in the near .

== Events ==
10 Sport holds broadcast rights to the following events:

=== Current ===
Sport	Event	Broadcast partner(s)	Dates	Notes
Combat sports	Zuffa Boxing	Paramount+	2026-2032	Select events also available on 10
Combat sports	Ultimate Fighting Championship	Paramount+	2026-2032	Select UFC events on 10
Futsal	FIFA Futsal Women's World Cup	Paramount+, FIFA+	2025	Final only, LIVE on 10
Motor racing	Formula One Australian Grand Prix	Fox Sports (2015–)	2003–present	Live coverage on 10.
Motor racing	MotoGP Australian motorcycle Grand Prix	Fox Sports	1997–present	Live coverage on 10.
Motor racing	Race of Champions		2025	Live coverage on 10.
Soccer	A-League Men	Paramount+	2017–2019, 2021–present	One matches every Saturday night on 10 Drama, including all finals
Soccer	A-League Women	Paramount+	2021–present	All games live on 10
Soccer	Socceroos Internationals	Paramount+	2018–2019, 2021–present	Every Game LIVE
Soccer	Matildas Internationals	Paramount+	2021–present	Every Game LIVE
Soccer	Pararoos Internationals	Paramount+	2021–present	Every Home Game LIVE on 10
Soccer	ParaMatildas Internationals	Paramount+	2021–present	Every Home Game LIVE on 10
Soccer	Australia Cup	Paramount+	2021–present	Every Game LIVE on 10 and the Australia Cup Final on Channel 10
Soccer	Women's Australia Cup	Paramount+	2025–present	Every Game LIVE on 10 and the Australia Cup Final on Channel 10
Soccer	A-Leagues All Stars Men	Paramount+	2021–present	Live on 10
Soccer	A-Leagues All Stars Women	Paramount+	2023–present	Live on 10
Soccer	Football Ashes	Paramount+	2023–present	Every Game LIVE
Soccer	FIFA World Cup qualification	Paramount+	2021–present	Every AFC matches live
Soccer	2027 FIFA Women's World Cup	Paramount+	2027	15 matches on Network 10, all matches on Paramount+
Soccer	FIFA Women's Youth World Cups	Paramount+, FIFA+	2024–present	Australia Women's U-20 and U-17 matches and a final LIVE on 10
Soccer	AFC Asian Cup	Paramount+	2023 and 2027	All Matches
Soccer	AFC Women's Asian Cup	Paramount+	2022 and 2026	All Matches
Soccer	AFC Olympic Qualifying Tournament	Paramount+	2021–2027	
Soccer	AFC Women's Olympic Qualifying Tournament	Paramount+	2021–2027	
Soccer	AFC U-23 Asian Cup	Paramount+	2023–2028	
Soccer	AFC U-20 Asian Cup	Paramount+	2023–2027	
Soccer	AFC U-17 Asian Cup	Paramount+	2023–present	
Soccer	AFC U-23 Women's Asian Cup	Paramount+	2021–present	
Soccer	AFC U-20 Women's Asian Cup	Paramount+	2021–present	
Soccer	AFC U-17 Women's Asian Cup	Paramount+	2021–present	
Soccer	AFC Champions League Elite	Paramount+ Sports	2021–present	
Soccer	AFC Champions League Two	Paramount+ Sports	2021–present	
Soccer	AFC Challenge League	Paramount+ Sports	2021–present	
Soccer	AFC Women's Champions League	Paramount+	2024–present	Seven matches live from quarter finals
Soccer	Coppa Italia	Paramount+ Sports	2024–2027	17 matches live, from round of 16 until final
Soccer	Supercoppa Italiana	Paramount+ Sports	2024–2027	Three matches (both semi finals and a final) live
Soccer	Scottish Cup	Paramount+ Sports	2023–present	Live
Soccer	Scottish League Cup	Paramount+ Sports	2023–present	Live
Surfing	Shaw and Partners Iron Series		2010–2013; 2025-present	

=== Past ===
Sport	Event	Broadcast partner(s)	Dates
Summer Olympics	Mexico City 1968, Los Angeles 1984, Seoul 1988	ABC (1968)	1968, 1984, 1988
Winter Olympics	Sochi 2014		2014
Air Racing	Red Bull Air Race World Championship		2007–2010, 2019
American football	NCAA College Football	ESPN	2008–2014
American football	National Football League	Fox Sports, ESPN	2008–2014
American football	Super Bowl	ESPN	2009–2014
Athletics	Stawell Gift		2000–2014
Australian rules	Victorian Football Association		1967–1986
Australian rules	Aussie Bowl		1986–1987
Australian rules	South Australian National Football League	ABC	1988
Australian rules	Australian Football League	Nine Network & Fox Footy Channel (2002–2006), Seven Network & Fox Sports (2007–2011)	2002–2011
Australian rules	International Rules Series		2006, 2011
Baseball	Australian Baseball League	ABC	1990s–1996
Baseball	Major League Baseball	Fox Sports, ESPN	2009–2013
Basketball	EuroBasket	ESPN	2003–2007
Basketball	NCAA College Basketball	ESPN	2009–2010
Basketball	FIBA Oceania Championship	ESPN	2011
Basketball	FIBA Oceania Women's Championship	ESPN	2011
Basketball	National Basketball Association	ESPN	1992–1999, 2008–2011
Basketball	Women's National Basketball Association	ESPN	2008–2011
Basketball	National Basketball League	Fox Sports (1995–1997), ESPN (2021–2025)	1992–1997, 2010–2015, 2021–2025
Basketball	Women's National Basketball League	ABC	1992–1996
Basketball	NBAxNBL: Melbourne Series	Amazon Prime Video	2025
Beach Cricket	Beach Cricket Tri-Nations series		2007–2009
Commonwealth Games	Edinburgh 1986, Victoria 1994, Delhi 2010, Glasgow 2014	ABC (1986), Foxtel (2010)	1986, 1994, 2010, 2014
Cricket	Test Series: West Indies vs. Australia		1995
Cricket	Australian WT20 Cup Final		2015
Cricket	Big Bash League		2013–2018
Cricket	Women's Big Bash League		2015–2018
Cricket	Champions League Twenty20		2009–2010, 2013
Cricket	Indian Premier League		2008–2010
Cricket	Sheffield Shield	ABC	1976
Cycling	Herald Sun Tour	SBS	2009, 2011
Golf	Australian Open	Fox Sports	2009–2011
Golf	Australian PGA Championship		2009–2013
Golf	World Golf Championships		2009–2013
Golf	New Zealand Open		2008–2012
Golf	New Zealand PGA Championship		2008–2013
Golf	Ryder Cup		2010–2012
Golf	U.S. Open	Fox Sports	2007–2011
Golf	U.S. Masters		2007–2013
Horse racing	Winterbottom Stakes	Sky Racing, Racing.com	2021–2023
Horse racing	Railway Stakes	Sky Racing, Racing.com	2021–2023
Horse racing	Kingston Town Classic	Sky Racing, Racing.com	2021–2023
Horse Racing	Coral Eclipse		2019
Horse Racing	Glorious Goodwood		2019
Horse Racing	July Cup Meeting		2019
Horse Racing	King George		2019
Horse Racing	Melbourne Cup Carnival	Sky Racing	1978–2001, 2019–2023
Horse Racing	Ebor Festival		2019
Horse Racing	Cambridgeshire Meeting		2019
Horse Racing	British Champions Day		2019
Ice hockey	National Hockey League	ESPN	2008–2014
Mixed martial arts	Bellator MMA	UFC TV	2021–2025
Mixed martial arts	One Championship	UFC TV	2020–2024
Motor racing	Australian Off Road Championship		2008–2016
Motor racing	Australian Rally Championship	Speed (2011–2014), Fox Sports (2015–present)	2011–2015, 2019–2020
Motor racing	Formula One International races	Fox Sports (2015–2022)	2003–2022
Motor racing	IndyCar Series	Fox Sports (Highlights show)	1996, 2008–2014
Motor racing	MotoGP International races	Fox Sports	1997–2021
Motor racing	NASCAR		2008–2014
Motor racing	Nations Cup	Fox Sports (Highlights show)	2000–2002
Motor racing	Superbike World Championship		1997–2006
Motor racing	Supercars Championship	Fox Sports (highlights, 1997–2006, live, 2015–2020)	1997–2006, 2015–2020
Motor racing	Bathurst 1000	Fox Sports (highlights, 2000–2006, live, 2015–2020)	2000–2006, 2015–2020
Motor racing	SuperUtes Series	Fox Sports (highlights, 2005–2006, live, 2015–2020)	2005–2006, 2015–2020
Motor racing	World Rally Championship	Speed (2011–2014), Fox Sports (live, 2015–present)	2011–2015, 2019–2020
Netball	ANZ Championship	Fox Sports (2015–2016)	2009–2012, 2015–2016
Netball	INF Netball World Cup	Fox Sports	1999, 2011, 2015
Netball	Constellation Cup	Fox Sports (2015–2016)	2008–2011, 2015–2016
Rugby League	New South Wales Rugby League	Seven Network (1973–1982), ABC (1973–1991), Nine Network (1983)	1973–1991
Rugby League	Amco Cup		1974–1989
Rugby League	Winfield Cup	Nine Network, ABC	1983–1991
Rugby League	State of Origin		1990
Rugby League	Kangaroo Tour	ABC (1986, 1990 France)	1980 (New Zealand) 1986, 1990 (Great Britain)
Rugby League	Australia national rugby league team	ABC (1979)	1979, 1980, 1986, 1990
Rugby Union	British and Irish Lions Tour	Fox Sports	2013
Rugby Union	Wallabies Spring Tour	Fox Sports	1992–1995, 2013–2014, 2020
Rugby Union	Pro14	Fox Sports	1992–1995, 2013–2020
Rugby Union	Super Rugby	Fox Sports	1992–1995, 2013–2020
Rugby Union	Bledisloe Cup	Fox Sports	1992–1995, 2013–2020
Rugby Union	Wallabies Internationals	Fox Sports	1992–1995, 2013–2020
Rugby Union	The Rugby Championship	Fox Sports	1992–1995, 2013–2020
Rugby Union	Rugby World Cup	Fox Sports	1995, 2007, 2019
Soccer	AFC Solidarity Cup	Paramount+ Sports	2021–2025
Soccer	AFC Winners' Cup	Paramount+ Sports	2021–2025
Soccer	AFC Super Cup	Paramount+ Sports	2021–2025
Soccer	FA Cup	Paramount+ Sports	2022–2024
Soccer	EFL Cup	Paramount+ Sports	2022–2024
Soccer	Community Shield	Paramount+ Sports	2022–2024
Soccer	Roshn Saudi League	Paramount+ Sports	2022–2026
Soccer	Saudi King's Cup	Paramount+ Sports	2022–2026
Soccer	Saudi Super Cup	Paramount+ Sports	2022–2026
Soccer	ADNOC Pro League	Paramount+ Sports	2024–2026
Soccer	UAE President's Cup	Paramount+ Sports	2024–2026
Soccer	UAE League Cup	Paramount+ Sports	2024–2026
Soccer	Charity Cup	Paramount+ Sports	2022–2024
Soccer	National Soccer League	C7 Sport	1977–1979
Swimming	Australian Swimming Championships		2009–2015
Swimming	FINA World Aquatics Championships		2009–2011
Swimming	Pan Pacific Swimming Championships		2010–2015
Tennis	Queensland Open		1987–1992
Tennis	Sydney Indoor		1973–1994
Tennis	Hopman Cup		2011–2013
Wrestling	WWE, WWF Raw, WWF Superstars, WWF pay per views	Fox Sports	1995–1999
Yachting	Sydney to Hobart Yacht Race		1980s–2004

== Programs ==
10 Sport has presented the following recurring programs:

Current

Sport (event)	Program	Years
All	Sports Tonight	1993–2011, 2018–2019, 2026–present
Soccer	The Weekly Kickoff	2021–present (10 Drama)
Soccer	Round Ball Rules	2021–present (Facebook)
Soccer	Game Of Two Halves	2021–present (YouTube)
Soccer	A-League All Access	2021–2024, 2026–present (YouTube), (Network 10)
Soccer	Football Tonight	2025–present (Network 10)

Past

Sport (event)	Program	Years
All	The Sports Show	1992
All	Thursday Night Live	2009–2010
All	The Thursday Night Sport Show	2014
All	The Back Page	2017–2018
Australian rules football	Before the Game	2003–2013
Australian rules football	One Week at a Time (AFL)	2009–2011
Australian rules football	The Fifth Quarter	2004–2011
Australian rules football	The Game Plan (AFL)	2011–2012
Australian rules football	Teams on 10	2020–2022
Australian rules football	The Final Siren	2011
Australian rules football	Simply Footy	2002–2011 (Adelaide only)
Australian rules football	Totally Footy	2002
Australian rules football	The Western Front	2002–2011 (Perth only)
Basketball	Air Time	1992–1997
Basketball	Saturday & Sunday Basketball	1990s
Basketball	Crash the Bash	2016–2018
Basketball	NBL Sunday Hoops	2021–2025
Basketball	Double Dribble	2022–2025
Basketball	NBL Slam	2021–2025
Cricket	MVP	2010
Cricket	Big Final Preview	2014
Horse Racing	Melbourne Cup Preview Show	2020–2023
Motorsport	RPM	1997–2008, 2011, 2015–2020
Rugby League	One Week at a Time (NRL)	2011
Rugby League	The Game Plan (NRL)	2011–2013
Soccer	Just for Kicks	2017–2018
Soccer	Socceroos: Road to Qatar 2022	2021–22
Soccer	Matildas: Countdown to India 2022	2021–22

== Podcasts ==
10 Sport has presented the following podcasts on 10 Speaks.

Current

Sport (event)	Program	Years
All	Talking Sport with Matt Burke	2020–present
Soccer	Football Companion	2021–present

Past

Sport (event)	Program	Years
Australian rules football	The Western Front	2019
Horse Racing	10 Speaks Racing	2021–2023
Horse Racing	Melbourne Cup Podcast	2019–2020
Rugby Union	Talking Rugby with Matt Burke	2019

== 10 Sports Staff ==
Sydney

- Tara Rushton (Weekdays anchor)
- Scott Mackinnon (Weekends anchor)
- Jelisa Apps (Fill-in anchor)
- Bence Hamerli (sports reporter)
- Chloe-Amanda Bailey (sports reporter)
- Trent Simpson (sports reporter)

Melbourne

- Stephen Quartermain (Main anchor)
- Caty Price (sports reporter/Fill-in anchor)
- Rob Waters (sports reporter)
- Nick Butler (sports reporter)
- Tim Morgan (sports reporter)

Queensland

- Veronica Eggleton (Main anchor)
- Josh Mclean (sports reporter/Fill-in anchor)
- Jacob Chicco (sports reporter)
- Jonathan Williams (sports reporter)

Adelaide

- Max Burford (Main anchor)
- Jase Kemp (sports reporter/Fill-in anchor)
- Dom Rinaldo (sports reporter)
- Jodie Oddy (sports reporter)

Perth

- Lachy Reid (Main anchor)
- Steve Allen (sports reporter/Fill-in anchor)
- Ashleigh Nelson (sports reporter)
- Steph Baumgartel (sports reporter)

== Staff and commentators ==
=== Football ===
==== Socceroos Internationals ====
Present

- Scott Mackinnon (Host, 2021–present)
- Niav Owens (Host, 2021–present)
- Tara Rushton (Host, 2021–present)
- Andy Harper (Play-by-Play Commentator, 2021–present)
- Mark Milligan (Expert Commentator, 2021–present)
- Bruce Djite (Expert Commentator, 2021–present)
- Alex Brosque (Expert Commentator, 2021–present)
- Georgia Yeoman-Dale (Expert Commentator, 2021–present)
- Luke Wilkshire (Expert Commentator, 2018–2019, 2021–present)
- Archie Thompson (Expert Commentator) 2018–2019, 2021–present)
- Tarek Elrich (Expert Commentator, 2021–present)
- Scott McIntyre (Tokyo Sideline Reporter, 2021–present)

==== Matildas Internationals ====
Present

- Tara Rushton (Host, 2021–present)
- Georgia Yeoman-Dale (Expert Commentator, 2021–present)
- Amy Chapman (Expert Commentator, 2021–present)
- Sarah Walsh (Expert Commentator, 2021–present)
- Ally Green (Expert Commentator, 2021–present)
- Grace Gill (Expert Commentator, 2021–present)
- Andy Harper (Expert Commentator, 2021–present)
- Tom Sermanni (Expert Commentator, 2021–present)
- Bence Hamerli (Sideline Reporter, 2021–present)

==== A-Leagues/Australia Cup/friendly matches ====
Present

- Tara Rushton (Host, 2017–2019, 2021–present)
- Daniel Garb (Host–Australia Cup, 2025–present)
- Robbie Thomson (Commentator, 2021–present)
- Andy Harper (Expert Commentator, 2017–2019, 2021–present)
- Amy Chapman (Expert Commentator, 2021–present)
- Mark Milligan (Expert Commentator, 2021–present)
- Bruce Djite (Expert Commentator, 2021–present)
- Alex Brosque (Expert Commentator, 2021–present)
- Georgia Yeoman-Dale (Expert Commentator, 2021–present)
- Luke Wilkshire (Expert Commentator, 2018–2019, 2021–present)
- Archie Thompson (Expert Commentator/Sideline Reporter VIC, 2017–2019, 2021–present)
- Tarek Elrich (Expert Commentator, 2021–present)
- Grace Gill (Expert Commentator, 2021–present)
- Daniel Georgievski (Expert Commentator, 2021–present)
- Daniel McBreen (Expert Commentator, 2021–present)
- Kenny Lowe (Expert Commentator, 2021–present)
- Scott McDonald (Expert Commentator, 2021–present)
- Nick Butler (Sideline Reporter VIC, 2021–present)
- Jamie Harnwell (Expert Commentator, 2021–present)
- Amy Duggan (Expert Commentator/Sideline Reporter NSW, 2021–present)
- Tristan MacManus (Sideline Reporter, 2022–present)

Past

- Robbie Slater (Fox Sports feed) 2017–2019
- Mark Bosnich (Fox Sports feed) 2017–2019
- Adam Peacock (Fox Sports feed) 2017–2019
- Simon Hill (Play-by-Play Commentator, 2021–25)

==== 2007 Sydney FC v LA Galaxy ====
- Bill Woods (Host) 2007
- David Basheer (Commentator) 2007
- Kevin Muscat (Commentator) 2007
- Mark Howard (Sideline Commentator) 2007

=== Olympic and Commonwealth Games ===
==== Glasgow 2014 CWG ====
From Glasgow studio

- Mel McLaughlin (late evening host)
- Matthew White (early morning host)
- Ian Thorpe (late evening co-host)
- Steve Hooker (early morning co-host)
- Leisel Jones (early morning co-host)
- Mark Howard (triathlon commentator/overnight host (when swimming finished)/hockey finals host on 10 Bold/poolside interviews/reporter)
- Tim Gossage (reporter)
- Roz Kelly (reporter)

From Melbourne (commentators lounge)

- Greg Rust (early evening host on 10 Bold)
- Gordon Bray (opening/closing ceremonies, hockey & rugby 7s commentator)
- Nicole Livingstone (swimming commentator)
- Liz Ellis (netball commentator)
- Emma Snowsill
- Rob de Castella
- Dave Culbert
- Melinda Gainsford-Taylor
- Scott McGrory
- Brad McEwan
- Sharelle McMahon
- Matt Burke
- Peter Donegan
- Ian Cohen

==== Sochi 2014 Winter Olympics ====
- Stephen Quartermain (Host)
- Steven Bradbury (Host)
- Mel McLaughlin (Host)
- Greg Rust (Host)
- Brad McEwan (Host)
- Nicole Livingstone (Host)
- Alisa Camplin
- Steven Lee
- Dave Culbert
- Rob Waters
- Nuala Hafner
- Mark Howard (Reporter)
- Max Futcher (Reporter)
- Matt Doran (Reporter)
- HG Nelson (Russian Revolution host)
- Roy Slaven (Russian Revolution host)

==== Delhi 2010 CWG ====
Various Ten programs including Toasted TV, Totally Wild, Puzzle Play, Huey's Kitchen, Neighbours, The 7PM Project, and Sports Tonight goes on hiatus during Ten's broadcast of the Commonwealth Games.

- Brad McEwan (Good Morning Delhi co-host)
- Kathryn Robinson (Good Morning Delhi co-host)
- Stephen Quartermain (afternoon host)
- Bill Woods (evening host)
- Corey Wingard (late nights host)
- Tim Lane (Athletics commentators)
- Dave Culbert (Athletics commentator)
- Rob de Castella (Athletics)
- Melinda Gainsford-Taylor (Athletics)
- Anthony Hudson (Swimming/Diving commentator)
- Nicole Livingstone (Swimming commentator)
- Dean Pullar (Diving commentator)
- Phil Liggett (Cycling commentator)
- Michael Turtur (Cycling)
- Dan Ryan (Gymnastics commentator)
- Stephanie Moorhouse (Gymnastics)
- Liz Ellis (Netball commentator)
- Luke Darcy (Netball commentator)
- Rob Waters (Hockey commentator)
- Brent Livermore (Hockey Commentator)
- Michael Christian (Weightlifting Commentator)
- Damian Brown (Weightlifting)
- Mark Howard (poolside interviews/reporter)
- Andy Maher (athletics reporter)
- Max Futcher (Reporter)
- Sandra Sully (Sports updates)
- Helen Kapalos (Sports updates)

==== Victoria 1994 CWG ====
- Tim Webster (host)
- Matt White (host)
- Anne Fulwood (host)
- Bill Woods (host)
- Norman May (Swimming/Ceremonies)
- Stephen Quartermain (Swimming)
- Rob Woodhouse (Swimming)
- Sandra Sully (Swimming)
- Gordon Bray (Athletics)
- Peter Donegan (Athletics)
- Gary Honey (Athletics)
- Rick Timperi (Boxing)
- Don Wagstaff (Badminton)
- Robert Kabbas (Weightlifting)
- Phil Liggett (Cycling)
- Tony Charlton (Gymnastics)
- Rob de Castella (Marathon)
- Tim Bailey (Reporter)

==== Seoul 1988 Olympics ====
- Mike Gibson (host)
- Bruce McAvaney (host/Athletics commentator)
- Tim Webster (host)
- Graeme Hughes (host)
- Raelene Boyle
- Mark Tonelli
- Stephen Quartermain
- Ron Clarke

=== Motorsport ===
==== Supercars Championship ====
Final

- Matthew White (commentator 2002–2003, host, 2015–2020)
- Rick Kelly (analysis, 2015–2020)
- Mark Howard (pit reporter, 2015–2018)
- Grant Denyer (reporter, 2015–2020)
- Kate Peck (reporter, 2015–2020)

==== Formula 1 ====
- Tara Rushton (Australian Grand Prix Host, 2022–present)
- Scott Mackinnon (Australian Grand Prix Host, 2022–present)
- Richard Craill (Australian Grand Prix Commentator, 2022–present)
- Tom Clarkson (Australian Grand Prix expert analysis, 2022–present)
- Mark Webber (Australian Grand Prix expert analysis, 2014–2019, 2022–present)
- Archie Thompson (Australian Grand Prix reporter, 2022–present)
- Natalie Hunter (Australian Grand Prix reporter, 2022–present)
- Rosanna Tennant (Australian Grand Prix reporter, 2023–present)
- Sam Power (Australian Grand Prix reporter, 2023–present)
- Damon Hill (Australian Grand Prix expert analysis, 2023–present)
- Tim McDonald (Australian Grand Prix reporter, 2023–present)
- Alan Jones (expert analysis, 2003–2019, 2023–present)
- Guenther Steiner (Australian Grand Prix expert analysis, 2024–present)

==== MotoGP ====
- Daryl Beattie (expert analysis, 2003–present)
- Tara Rushton (host, 2022–present)
- Scott Mackinnon (2022–present)
- Sam Charlwood (motorsport expert, 2022–present)

==== RPM ====
- Matthew White (host, 2015–2020)
- Alan Jones (F1, 2015–2020)
- Daryl Beattie (MotoGP, 2015–2020)

==== Past ====
- Matthew White (host and Australian Grand Prix Main commentator, 2015–2019)
- Mel McLaughlin (Australian GP host, 2014–2016)
- Adam Gilchrist (Australian Grand Prix host, 2016–2018)
- Rick Kelly (expert analysis, 2015–2020)
- Kate Peck (reporter, 2015–2020)
- Bill Woods (RPM/Supercars/F1/MotoGP host/commentator, 1997–2006)
- Mark Howard (MotoGP Host/Australian Grand Prix Pit Reporter, 2009–2018)
- Barry Sheene (RPM/MotoGP commentator, 1997–2002)
- Neil Crompton (RPM/F1/Supercars/commentator, 1997–2006)
- Leigh Diffey (Supercars host/commentator, 1997–1999, 2001, 2005–2006)
- Craig Baird (RPM/F1/MotoGP expert analysis, 2010–2012)
- Cameron McConville (RPM/F1 expert analysis, 2007–2009)
- Mark Larkham (expert analysis, 2015–2017)
- James Allen (Australian Grand Prix Ground correspondent 2011–2015)

=== Horse Racing ===
==== Melbourne Cup ====
- Eddie McGuire (host, 2022–23)
- Michael Felgate (host, 2019–23)
- Caty Price, (host, 2019–23)
- Matt Hill (Race caller, 2019–23)
- Francesca Cumani (International racing expert, 2019–22)
- Brittany Taylor (Mounting yard expert, 2019–23)
- David Gately (Racing expert, 2019–23)
- James Winks (Racing expert, 2020–23)
- Michelle Payne (Racing expert, 2021–23)
- Natalie Hunter (Presentations/reporter, 2020–23)
- Georgie Tunny (Racing presenter, 2021–23)
- Rob Mills (Style presenter, 2020–23)
- Kate Freebairn (Fashion presenter, 2021–23)
- Natalie Yoannidis (Reporter, 2021–23)
- Nick Butler (Reporter, 2020–23)
- Lee Steele (Reporter, 2020–23)
- Jono Williams (Reporter, 2020–23)
- Brendan Crew (Reporter, 2021–23)
- Natasha Exelby (Reporter, 2021–22)
- Gerard Middleton (Betting, 2019, 2021–23)

Former

- Stephen Quartermain (host, 2020)
- Gorgi Coghlan (host, 2020)
- Adam Hamilton (Betting, 2020)
- Victoria Latu (Fashions on the Field, 2020)
- Kate Peck (presenter/reporter, 2019)
- Brett Clappis (Reporter, 2020)
- Jo Holley (Reporter, 2020)
- Sarah Harris (Reporter, 2020)
- Tristan MacManus (Reporter, 2020)
- Peter Moody (racing expert, 2019–2020)
- Matt White (Host, 2019)
- Beau Ryan (Reporter, 2019)
- Anna Heinrich (Reporter, 2019)
- Scott Tweedie (Reporter, 2019)
- Dave Thornton (Reporter, 2019)
- Georgia Love (Reporter, 2019)
- Elliot Garnaut (Reporter, 2019)
- Tim Webster (Host, 1991–2001)
- Sandra Sully (Host, late 1990s–2001)
- Peter Donegan (Host, early 1990s–2001)
- Tim Bailey (Reporter, late 1990s–2001)
- Lyn Talbot (Reporter, late 1990s–2001)
- Beau Ryan (Reporter, late 1990s–2001)
- Dan Mielicki (Race Caller, early 1990s–2001)
- Gary Willetts (Race Caller, early 1990s–2001)
- Jenny Chapman (Mounting Yard, late 1990s–2001)
- John Letts (Interviews, late 1980s–2001)
- Tim Gossage (Betting Ring, late 1990s–early 2000s)
- Simon Marshall (Reporter, late 1990s–2001)
- Richard Freeman (Racing Expert, 1990s)
- Mike Gibson (Host, late 1980s–early 1990s)
- Bob Maumill (Betting Ring, late 1980s–early 1990s)
- Bruce McAvaney (Host/Race Caller, late 1980s–early 1990s)
- Peter Keenan (Reporter, late 1980s–early 1990s)
- Graham Kelly (Mounting Yard, late 1980s–early 1990s)
- Jennifer Keyte (presentations, 2019)
- Annie Kearney (reporter, 2019–2020)
- Roz Kelly (presenter/reporter, 2019–2020)

==== Tabtouch Masters ====
Present

- Caty Price, (host, 2021–present)
- Brittany Taylor (host, 2021–present)
- James Winks (Racing expert, 2021–present)
- Scott Embry (Racing expert, 2021–present)
- Lochie Taylor (Racing expert, 2021–present)
- Darren McCauley (racecaller, 2021–present)
- Lachy Reid (Mounting yard reporter, 2021–present)
- Lee Steele (reporter, 2021–present)
- Alana McLean (reporter, 2021–present)

=== Rugby Union ===
==== Final ====
- Gordon Bray (commentator, 2013–2020)
- Matt Burke (host/commentator, 2013–2020)
- Nathan Sharpe (sideline commentator, 2015–2020)
- Greg Rust (NZ sideline commentator, 2020)
- Morgan Turinui (AUS sideline commentator, 2020)

==== Former ====
- Stirling Mortlock (sideline commentator, 2013–2014)
- Stephen Moore (expert analysis, 2014)
- Matthew White (host, 2014–2019)

==== Rugby World Cup ====
- Gordon Bray (commentator, 2019)
- Matt Burke (commentator, 2019)
- Bill Woods (Host, 2007)
- Ben Darwin (Analysis, 2007)
- Ben Tune (Analysis, 2007)

=== Rugby League ===
==== Winfield Cup ====
- Rex Mossop (Host)
- Ray Warren (Chief Commentator)
- Peter Sterling (Commentator)
- Graeme Hughes (Commentator)
- Wayne Pearce (Commentator)

==== The Game Plan (NRL) ====
- Steve Roach (Panelist, 2011–2013)
- Joel Caine (Panelist, 2011–2013)

=== Cricket ===
==== Big Bash League ====
- Mark Howard (host/commentator, 2013–2018)
- Adam Gilchrist (host/commentator, 2013–2018)
- Andrew Maher (commentator, 2013–2018)
- Ricky Ponting (commentator, 2013–2018)
- Damien Fleming (commentator, 2013–2018)
- Mark Waugh (commentator, 2013–2018)
- Tim Gossage (boundary) commentator, Perth games, 2013–2018)
- Mel Jones (commentator/boundary commentator, 2015–2018)
- Lisa Sthalekar (boundary) commentator, 2015–2018)
- Kevin Pietersen (guest commentator, 2014–2018)
- Darren Lehmann (guest commentator, 2016–2018)
- Andrew Symonds (guest commentator, 2016–2018)
- Brendon McCullum (guest commentator, 2016–2018)
- Michael Vaughan (guest commentator, 2017–2018)
- Graeme Swann (guest commentator, 2017–2018)
- Viv Richards (guest commentator, 2013–2015)
- Mel McLaughlin (host, 2013–2016)
- Andrew Flintoff (commentator, 2014–2016)

==== Women's Big Bash League ====
- Andrew Maher (host/commentator, 2015–2018)
- Adam Gilchrist (host/commentator, 2016–2018)
- Mel Jones (commentator, 2015–2018)
- Lisa Sthalekar (commentator, 2015–2018)
- Belinda Clark (guest commentator, 2015–2018)
- Mel McLaughlin (host, 2015–2016)

==== XXXX Gold Beach Cricket ====
- Andrew Maher (host/commentator)
- Tim Bailey (commentator)
- Colin Miller (commentator)
- Graham Gooch (commentator)

=== Australian Rules ===
10 Sport previously broadcast Australian Rules (2002–2011). The 10 Sport AFL commentary team, won the 2012 Silver Logie Award for "Most Outstanding Sport Program", for its telecast of the 2011 AFL Grand Final hosted by Stephen Quartermain.

==== Australian Football League ====
- Stephen Quartermain (host and commentator) (2002–2011)
- Anthony Hudson (host and commentator) (2002–2011)
- Tim Lane (host and commentator) (2003–2011)
- Michael Christian (commentator & The Fifth Quarter) (2002–2011)
- Malcolm Blight (expert commentator & The Fifth Quarter) (2002–2011)
- Robert Walls (expert commentator) (2002–2011)
- Luke Darcy (expert commentator & The Fifth Quarter) (2006–2011)
- Matthew Lloyd (expert commentator & The Fifth Quarter) (2009–2011)
- Stephen Silvagni (expert commentator) (2002–2006)
- Mark Howard (boundary rider) (2007–2011)
- Andrew Maher (The Fifth Quarter, Before the Game and boundary rider VIC matches) (2002–2011)
- Kelli Underwood (commentator and boundary rider) (2009–2011)
- Christi Malthouse (boundary rider) (2002–2008)
- Gerard Whateley (boundary rider and commentator) (2002–2003)
- Peter Daicos (expert commentator) (2002–2003)
- Neil Cordy (boundary rider NSW matches) (2002–2011)
- Tim Gossage (boundary rider WA matches) (2002–2011)
- Bill McDonald (boundary rider QLD matches) (2002–2011)
- Corey Wingard (boundary rider SA matches) (2006–2011)

==== 1988 State Games ====
- Phil Marker (host and commentator) (1988)
- Ian Day (commentator) (1988)
- Graham Campbell (commentator) (1988)

==== Aussie Bowl ====
- Stephen Quartermain (host) (1987–1988)
- Bruce McAvaney (commentator) (1987–1988)
- Eddie McGuire (commentator) (1987–1988)

==== Victorian Football Association ====
- Rex Hunt
- Bruce McAvaney
- Eddie McGuire
- Fred Cook
- Ted Henry
- Craig Kelly
- Ken Bennett
- Rob Astbury
- Clem Dimsey
- Ray Shaw
- Rob Astbury

==== The Game Plan ====
- Anthony Hudson (Host, 2011)
- Mark Howard (Host, 2012)
- Wayne Carey (Panelist, 2012)
- Scott Cummings (Panelist, 2011–2012)
- Matthew Lloyd (Panelist, 2011–2012)

==== Before the Game ====
- Andy Maher (Host, 2005–2013)
- Anthony Hudson (Host, 2003–2004)
- Peter Helliar (Panelist, 2003–2006)
- Damian Callinan (Panelist, 2003)
- Sam Lane (Panelist, 2003–2012)
- Dave Hughes (Panelist, 2003–2013)
- Anthony Lehmann (2004–2013)
- Mick Molloy (2007–2013)
- Ryan Fitzgerald (2010–2013)
- Neroli Meadows (2013)

=== Swimming ===
- Nicole Livingstone (commentator, 2009–2015)
- Mark Howard (poolside interviews, 2009–2014)
- Tim Gossage (poolside interviews, 2015)
- Mel McLaughlin (host, 2014–2015)
- Anthony Hudson (host/commentator, 2009–2011)
- Stephen Quartermain (host/commentator, 2012)
- Leisel Jones (co-host, 2014)

=== Netball – ANZ Premiership and Diamonds Matches ===
- Kelli Underwood (Caller)
- Luke Darcy (Caller)
- Catherine Cox (Expert)
- Bianca Chatfield (Expert)
- Liz Ellis (Expert)
- Sharelle McMahon (Expert)
- Dan Ryan (Courtside)

=== Basketball ===
==== National Basketball League ====
- Neroli Meadows (host/courtside reporter, 2021–2025)
- Jack Heverin (host/commentator, 2021–2025)
- Andrew Gaze (commentator, 2010–2015, 2021–2025)
- Liam Santamaria (commentator, 2021–2025)
- Peter Hooley (commentator, 2021–2025)
- Lanard Copeland (commentator, 2021–2025)
- John Casey (courtside reporter, 2021–2025)
- Shane Heal (courtside reporter, 2010–2014, 2021–2025)

Former

- Stephen Quartermain (host/commentator, Melbourne only, 1992–1997)
- Steve Carfino (host/commentator, 1992–1995, 2010–2014)
- Bill Woods (host/commentator, 1992–1997, 2014–2015)
- Brett Maher (commentator, Adelaide only, 2010–2015)
- Tony Ronaldson (commentator, Perth only, 2010–2015)
- Tim Gossage (host/commentator, Perth Only, 1992–1997, 2014)
- Shane Heal (commentator, Sydney only, 2010–2014)
- Lachy Reid (commentator, 2010–2015)

== Logo history ==
January 2008 – 25 March 2009
8 May 2011 – 21 June 2013

22 June 2013 – 31 October 2018

31 October 2018 – 26 June 2025

== Awards ==
Sports coverage and programs made by 10 Sport have been won and been nominated for several awards at the Logie Awards.

== See also ==
- ABC Sport
- Seven Sport
- Nine's Wide World of Sports
- SBS Sport
- Fox Sports (Australia)
- Stan Sport
- List of Australian television series
- List of longest running Australian television series
