= Game Plan =

Game Plan or The Game Plan may refer to:

== Television ==
- Game Plan (TV series), a 2012 Singaporean Chinese drama series
- The Game Plan (AFL), a 2011–2012 Australian rules football programme
- The Game Plan (NRL), a 2011–2013 Australian rugby league programme
- Gameplan, a 2007 Filipino sports program
- "Game Plan" (He-Man and the Masters of the Universe), a 1983 episode
- "The Game Plan" (The O.C.), a 2005 episode
- "The Game Plan" (This Is Us), a 2016 episode

== Other uses ==
- Game Plan (company), a defunct American pinball machine manufacturer
- The Game Plan (film), a 2007 American sports comedy
- GamePlan (play), a 2001 play by Alan Ayckbourn
- Game Plan, a 2023 EP by Jeon Somi

== See also ==
- Gameplan II, a play-by-mail game
- Sports strategy
