= Inside Supercars =

- Genre: Motor racing program
- Presented by: Jessica Yates
- Starring: Neil Crompton; Greg Rust; Mark Skaife; Craig Lowndes
- Country of origin: Australia
- Original language: English
- No. of seasons: 3
- No. of episodes: 110

Production
- Production locations: Sydney, New South Wales
- Running time: 60 minutes (including commercials)

Original release
- Network: Fox Sports
- Release: 3 March 2015 – 22 November 2017

Related
- RPM; Supercars Life; V8Xtra

Inside Supercars was an Australian television series, based on the Supercars Championship, that aired on Fox Sports.

== Format ==
=== 2015–16 ===
Each episode featured a panel of guests, led by two regular hosts; journalist Greg Rust and former championship-winner Mark Skaife. They were normally joined on the panel by a rotating selection of two current Supercars Championship drivers, as well as contributions from at least one other expert commentator. These contributors included former drivers, journalists and even outsiders to the sport, such as former netball player Liz Ellis. The series featured event previews and reviews, as well as extended pre-recorded interviews with major figures from the category. The show aired on Tuesdays at 7.30pm on Fox Sports 5, and was repeated various times during the week on the network. It also airs on Sky Sport in New Zealand.

=== 2017 ===
In 2017 the show was re-launched with Fox Sports journalist Jessica Yates taking over from Rust as host of the show. Skaife and Neil Crompton remained as senior panellists, with Rust joining the three in hosting several special episodes at team workshops in between events.

== History ==
In late 2013 it was announced that Fox Sports, in a shared deal with Network Ten, had acquired the broadcast rights for what was then known as the V8 Supercars series, as of the 2015 season. To accompany their new coverage of the category, in early 2015 Fox Sports launched both this series as well as the documentary-style Supercars Life series. The first episode was broadcast on 3 March, two days after the opening event of the 2015 season; the 2015 Clipsal 500 Adelaide. The episode featured James Courtney, the winner of the Adelaide event, and Scott McLaughlin as the inaugural driver guests, with Liz Ellis and Riana Crehan also joining Rust and Skaife on the panel.

The series returned for 2016 on 8 March, two days after the 2016 Clipsal 500 Adelaide. The episode featured the event winner Nick Percat and one of the Saturday pole-sitters Scott Pye as driver guests. Russell Ingall joined the series as a semi-regular panellist in 2016, while Neil Crompton provided feature interviews with team managers. In 2017, the series was re-launched on Wednesday nights, with Yates taking over as host from Rust as one of various changes to the format and presentation of the show.

== Demise ==
In early 2018 it was announced that the show would not return, with the studio-based show to be replaced by a new show, Supercars Trackside. The new show airs on the Thursday and Sunday nights of each event in the Supercars Championship and features Yates, Skaife and Ingall as the main presenters.

== Regular presenters ==
=== Host ===
- Jessica Yates

=== Senior panellists ===
- Neil Crompton
- Greg Rust
- Mark Skaife
- Craig Lowndes

=== Contributors ===
- Russell Ingall
- Greg Murphy
- Chad Neylon
- Aaron Noonan

=== Past contributors ===
- Riana Crehan
- Liz Ellis
- Mark Fogarty
- Bruce Newton
- James Phelps
- Steve Price

== See also ==
- List of Australian television series
- List of longest-running Australian television series
