= Joel Caine =

Australian rugby league footballer

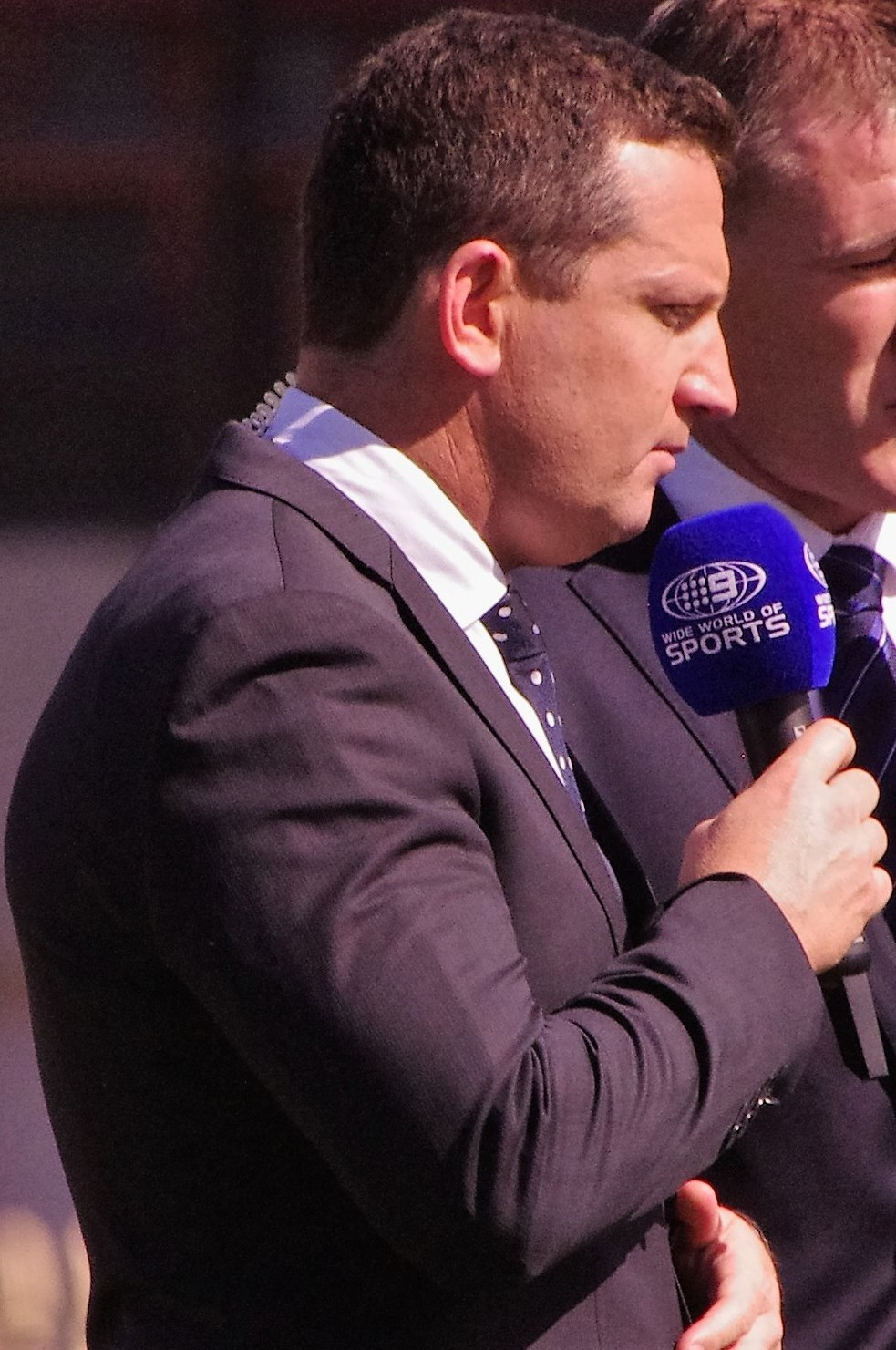

Personal information
- Born: 18 September 1978 (age 48) Australia

Playing information
- Height: 175 cm (5 ft 9 in)
- Weight: 84 kg (13 st 3 lb)
- Position: Fullback, Wing
Club
Years	Team	Pld	T	G	FG	P
1998	St. George Dragons	3	0	0	0	0
1999	Balmain	19	4	38	0	92
2000–03	Wests Tigers	75	26	211	0	526
2003	London Broncos	6	4	1	0	18
2004	Salford City Reds	24	8	13	0	58
	Total	127	42	263	0	694
- Relatives: Jess Caine (brother); Tony Caine (brother)

Joel Caine (born 18 September 1978) is an Australian former professional rugby league footballer who played in the 1990s and 2000s and works as a presenter for Sportsbet.

Caine played in both the fullback and wing positions.

== Rugby League career ==
Caine played for the St. George Dragons, the Balmain Tigers and the Wests Tigers in the NRL. In the Super League he played for the London Broncos and the Salford City Reds.

Caine made his debut for St. George in round 23 of the 1998 NRL season against the Canberra Raiders at Bruce Stadium. Caine played in St. George's final game before they formed a joint venture with the Illawarra Steelers to become St. George Illawarra. A semi-final loss to Canterbury-Bankstown at Kogarah Oval.

In the 1999 NRL season, Caine joined Balmain. He finished as the club's top point scorer in their final season as a stand-alone entity in the competition. Caine played in the club's final game in the NRL which was a 42–14 loss against Canberra at Bruce Stadium. Balmain would then merge with fellow foundation club Western Suburbs to form the Wests Tigers as part of the NRL's rationalisation policy.

In the inaugural Wests Tigers game in February 2000, Caine scored three tries and kicked four goals against the Brisbane Broncos. The 20 points scored was a club record for over five years, and it was over two years later before another Wests Tigers players scored a treble. Caine held the Wests Tigers' records for most total points scored by a player and most points scored in a season (224 in 2000). All records were later surpassed by Brett Hodgson. He remains the third highest point-scorer for the club, having scored 526 points during his 4 years with Wests Tigers.

Caine later played some country rugby league with the Parkes Spacemen. He was chosen to represent Western Division, but withdrew due to overseas travel.

== Post Rugby League career ==
Caine has previously worked with radio's 2GB as a sideline reporter, and with television's ONE HD on Thursday Night Live (2009–10) and Sportsbet .

In 2011, he began co-hosting The Game Plan (NRL), which began airing on ONE HD and switched networks to Channel Ten in mid-2012.

In 2014, Caine became the face of Sportsbet.com.au for rugby league telecasts. This also sees him have a role on the Nine Network with The Footy Show.

In 2015, he was working as a rugby league commentator with Fox Sports.

In 2018, Caine became the lead commentator for Channel 9's coverage of The Intrust Super Premiership NSW.

In 2019, Caine was announced as one of the lead callers for 2GB's Continuous Call Team. Caine was chosen to call games mainly on a Saturday and Sunday.

== Personal life ==
He is the older brother of Cronulla-Sutherland Sharks player Tony Caine.
