= Sportsworld (Australian TV series) =

- Presented by: Johanna Griggs (2001–2006); Matthew White (2004–2006)
- Country of origin: Australia
- Original language: English
- No. of seasons: 17

Production
- Production locations: Melbourne (1990–2003); Sydney (2004–2006)
- Running time: 60 minutes

Original release
- Network: Seven Network
- Release: 1990 – 2006

Related
- AFL Game Day

Sportsworld was an Australian sports information program shown on Seven Network. The program was broadcast from 9:00 a.m. to 11:00 a.m., following Weekend Sunrise on Sunday mornings, from Seven's Martin Place streetfront studios in Sydney.

Prior to its final format, Sportsworld had usually been shown on Sunday mornings since its debut in the 1990s. Its host then was Bruce McAvaney. It was then revamped to a sport panel show in which Johanna Griggs hosted alongside Paul Salmon out of Seven Melbourne. In 2004, it was revamped into a chat style show with Johanna Griggs and Sandy Roberts. Matthew White replaced Roberts in late 2004. The program's final season was 2006; it was not renewed due to budget concerns and time constraints due to AFL and V8 Supercars, two sports which the Seven Network were to regain the broadcasting rights to in 2007.

== Presenters ==
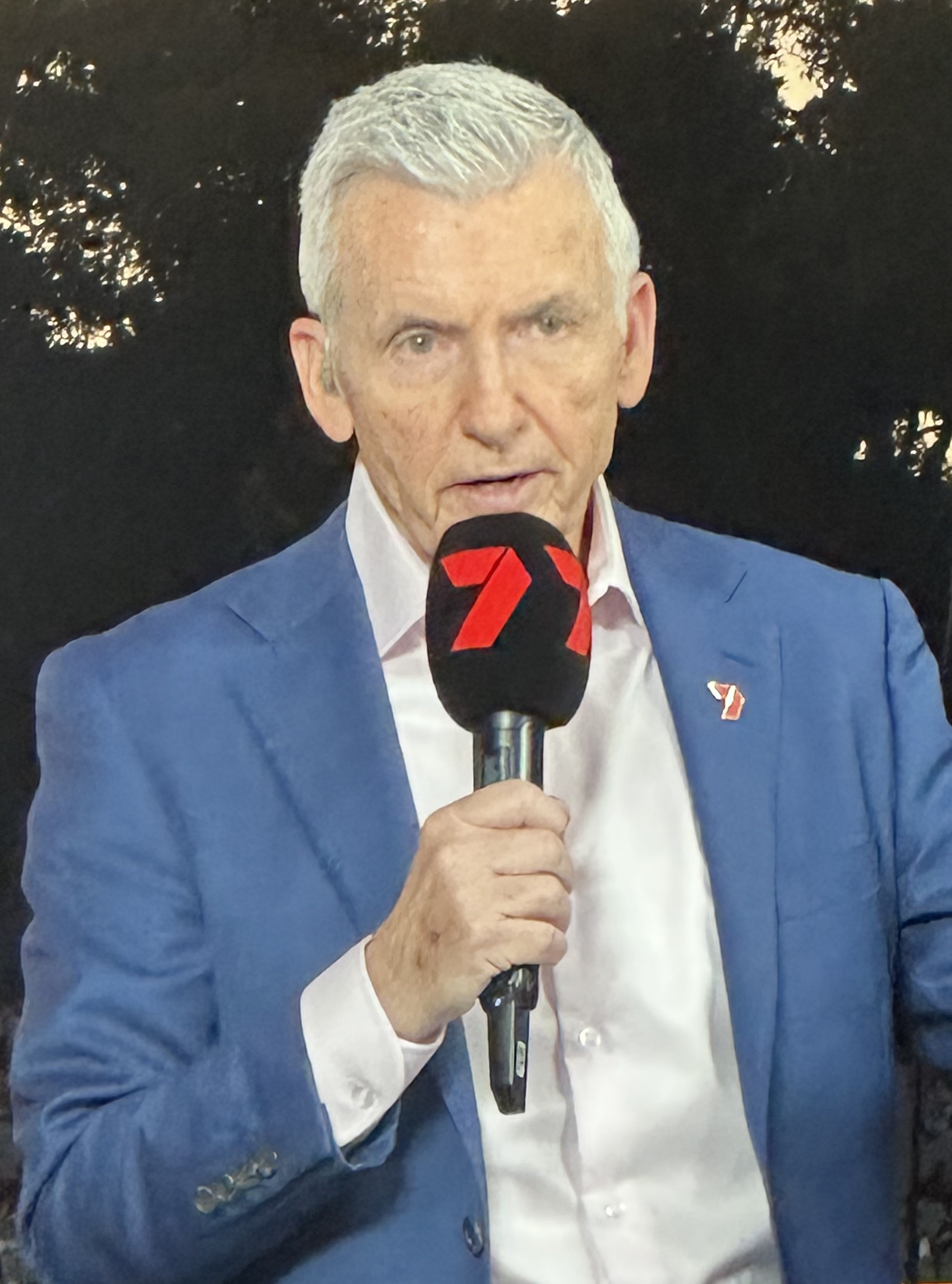
Bruce McAvaney

Presenters on this show included:

- Garry Wilkinson
- Rex Mossop
- Kylie Gillies
- Johanna Griggs
- Rex Hunt
- Dixie Marshall
- Bruce McAvaney
- Sandy Roberts
- Paul Salmon
- Matthew White
- Cameron Williams
