= Kate Peck =

Australian model and television presenter

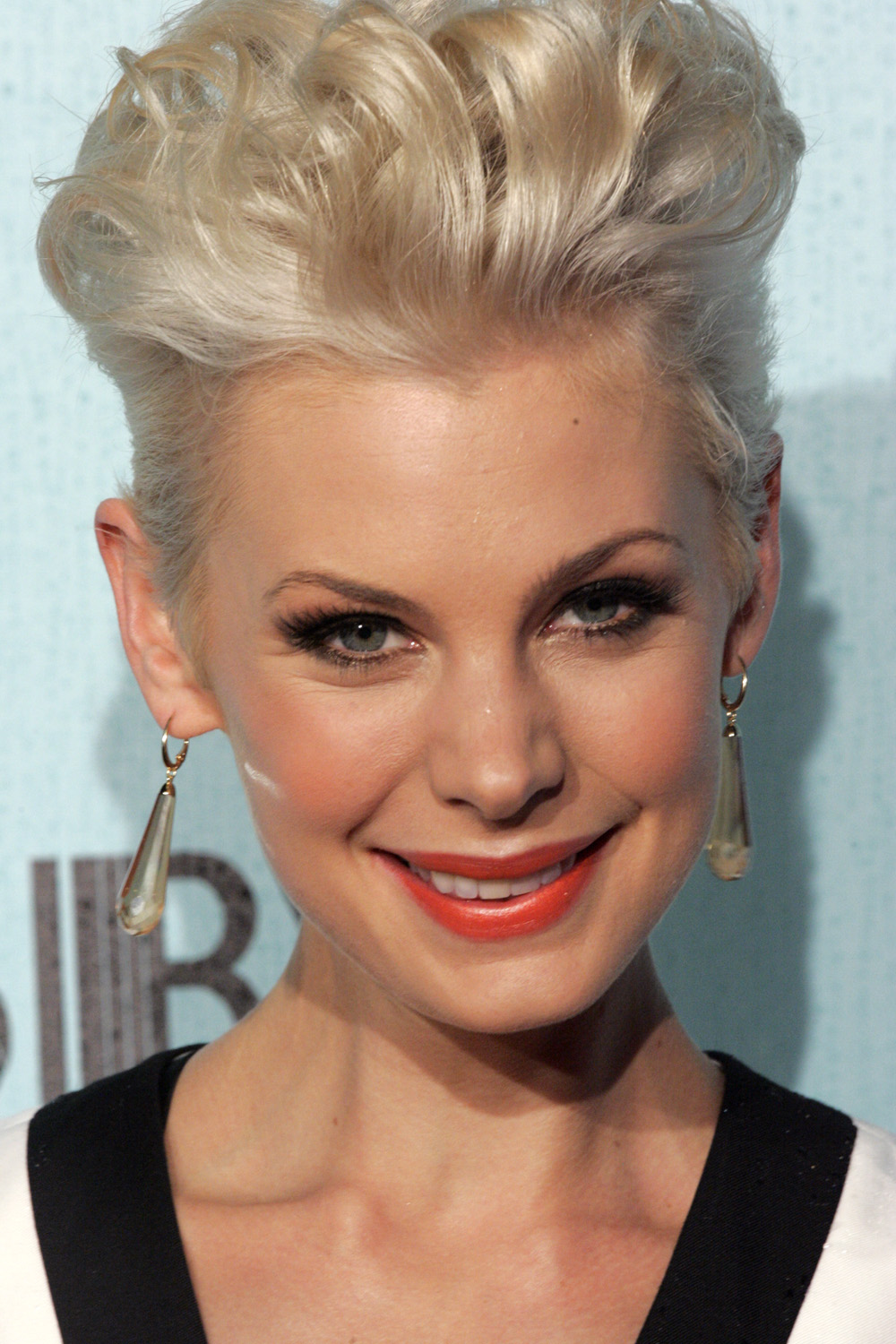
- Peck in 2013
- Born: 1988 (age 37–38); Australia
- Modeling information
- Height: 178 cm (5 ft 10 in)
- Hair color: Blonde
- Eye color: Blue
- Agency: Chadwick

Kate Peck (born 1988) is an Australian model and television presenter.

Peck competed in the third season of Search for a Supermodel in 2002. She modelled for Myer from 2014 to 2015.

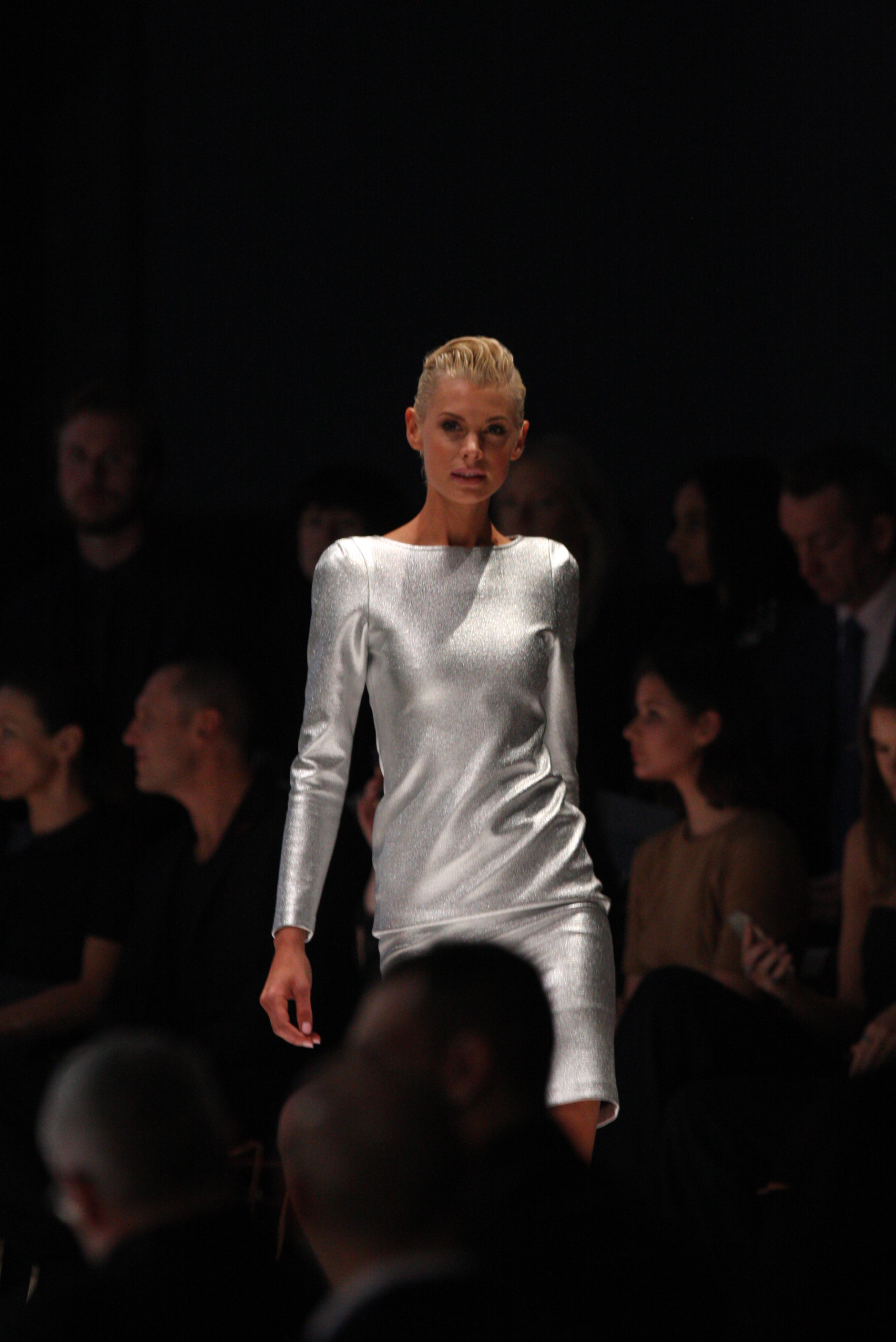
Peck at the Myer Spring/Summer 2015 Fashion Launch.

She works as a VJ on MTV and as a reporter on RPM on Ten Sport.
