= Tara Rushton =

Australian sports presenter

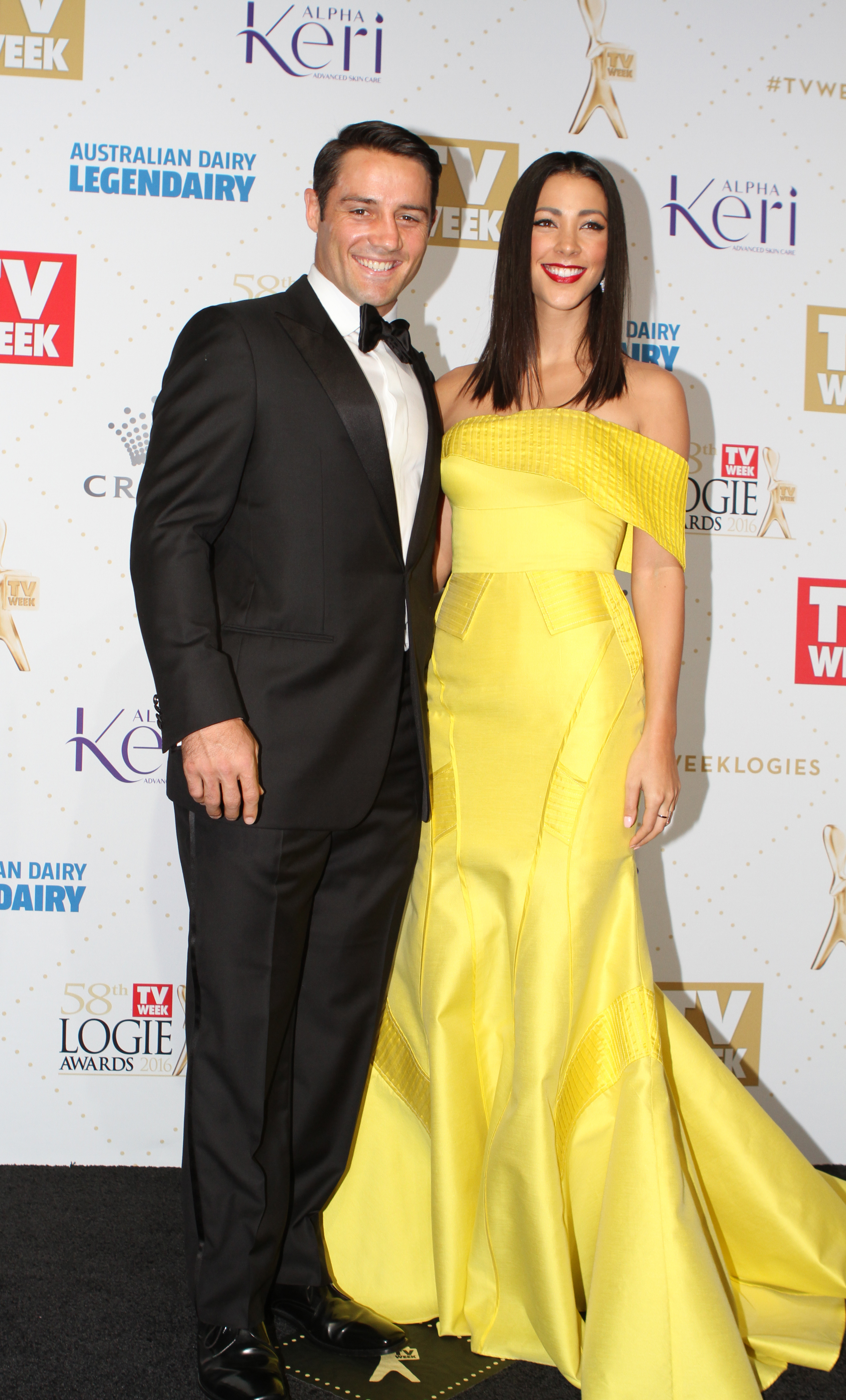
- Rushton (right) and Cooper Cronk in 2016
- Born: 2 July 1984 (age 42); Perth, Western Australia
- Occupation: Sport presenter
- Years active: 2005–present
- Employer: 10 Sport
- Known for: Kick Off and Sunday Shootout; Sport presenter on Fox Sports
- Spouse: Cooper Cronk (m. 2017)

Tara Rushton (born 2 July 1984) is an Australian sports presenter and journalist.

Rushton is currently sports presenter on 10 News Sydney. She has previously presented the association football series Kick Off and Sunday Shootout on Fox Sports Australia as well as appearing on Fox Sports News.

== Early life ==
Born in Perth, Rushton grew up on the Mornington Peninsula in Victoria, before moving to Sydney where she attended school at Oakhill College. She then completed a Diploma in Journalism and a Bachelor of Arts at Macleay College, majoring in Media and Communications. She moved to London at the age of 18.

== Career ==
In 2010, Rushton moved to Singapore and took on a television presenting role on Singtel TV's Mio Stadium channel. She hosted the English Premier League-focused Tiger Goals on Sunday series.

In 2013, Rushton moved home to Australia and replaced the departing Mel McLaughlin on Fox Sports. As well as presenting match broadcasts of the A-League, English Premier League and Socceroos matches, she also began presenting the network's weekly A-League wrap show, Sunday Shootout, alongside, as of 2016, Mark Bosnich, John Kosmina and Ned Zelic. When not hosting from the studio, she is also often used as a sideline reporter in matches that Fox Sports presents.

In 2015, Rushton was nominated for an ASTRA award, for Most Outstanding Female Presenter.

Rushton co-anchored UFC Fight Week for Fox Sports

In October 2021 Rushton joined the Network 10 Sport Football Commentary Team for All the A-Leagues, Matildas, Socceroos and FFA Cup matches as a sports presenter.

In December 2024, Rushton was appointed sports presenter on 10 News Sydney replacing Matt Burke from 2025.

== Personal life ==
Rushton is mixed-race, being half-Anglo-Celtic Australian (through her father) and her late mother Hillary being a member of the Anglo-Burmese community in Western Australia. She is an avid Arsenal F.C. fan, having previously lived in Islington in North London, near Arsenal's home ground. Her favourite player is Thierry Henry. She has also played local football herself, for Lindfield F.C. on Sydney's North Shore. In January 2016, she started dating former National Rugby League player Cooper Cronk. They married on 14 December 2017. They have two sons, born in 2018 and 2021.
