= Greg Rust =

Australian motor racing presenter

- Born: Gregory Paul Rust; 19 July 1970 (age 56); Sydney, Australia

Gregory Paul Rust (born 19 July 1970 in Sydney) is an Australian motor racing journalist and presenter. He has previously worked for Network Ten, the Nine Network and the Special Broadcasting Service (SBS) as a freelance commentator/reporter/presenter, mainly covering motor racing.

== Early life ==
Rust was born in Sydney Australia on 19 July 1970. Rust has a brother and sister. Born into a family with a genuine love for all forms of motorsport, he was a regular at the Sydney Showground Speedway as a child and competed as an amateur racer in karts. After leaving high school, he worked on a cadetship program with ANZ specialising in home loans. In his late teens and early twenties, Rust enjoyed some class wins as a driver in rallysprints and khana-crosses after buying a modified Mitsubishi Galant with several close friends.

== Radio career ==
Rust worked for three years with the Macquarie Radio Network stations 2GB and 2CH in Sydney initially as a sport reporter and later became a daytime news reader.

== Television career ==
=== Early years ===
After cutting his teeth with SBS motorsport program Speedweek, Rust was drafted into Channel 9's commentary team for the final Australian Motorcycle Grand Prix at the Eastern Creek Raceway in 1996. He called the support races with 1980 Formula One World Champion Alan Jones.

=== Network Ten ===
In 1997 he was hired by Ten to host the Australian Super Touring Championship for 2-litre Touring Cars - a position previously held by his close friend Leigh Diffey, who had moved on to Network Ten's V8 Supercar coverage. Rust commentated the Australian Super Touring Championship for 2 years before starting work as V8 pit reporter late in 1998. He was a part of Ten's V8 coverage for almost 10 years - even hosting and anchoring the commentary on occasions. During this period the station won numerous Logie Awards for its broadcast of the famous Bathurst 1000 and Rust developed a reputation as a pit specialist also working on the Gold Coast Indy 300 and the Australian Grand Prix in Melbourne. Despite an offer to join the Seven Network in 2007, Rust stayed with Ten to front the station's MotoGP and F1 broadcasts and its long running magazine motorsport show RPM. He also hosted and commentated Ten's coverage of the Red Bull Air Race series.

Outside of motorsport, Rust worked alongside Sandra Sully and former 2GB colleague Jason Morrison assisting in Channel 10's initial coverage of the September 11 attacks by logging footage and by writing and voicing a 5 minute snapshot story on what had unfolded for a special breakfast bulletin, working until sun up. Rust also worked on One's coverage of the 2014 Winter Olympics. and the Glasgow Commonwealth Games.

=== V8 Media and Fox Sports ===
In 2015, the V8 Supercars television rights moved to a shared broadcast between Fox Sports and Network Ten. The broadcast shared a common commentary team, produced by V8 Supercars Media and headed up by Rust and Neil Crompton. Rust also began hosting Fox Sports' new V8 Supercars panel series ‘’Inside Supercars’’. He fronts the coverage for various international networks and in 2016 made a return to pit reporting for the races. alongside commentating the Super2 Series, with four time Bathurst 1000 winner Greg Murphy. At the end of the 2017 season, Rust announced he would be leaving the Supercars television broadcast team.

== Personal life ==
Rust is married to his wife Sarah and has two daughters, Georgie who is a model and Stella. They reside in New Zealand, living near Supercars legend and close friend Greg Murphy. Rust has also driven V8 Supercars, Formula Holden, Formula Ford, Toyota Racing Series and Speedcars/Midgets for story research. He is colloquially known as "Rusty" or "Thrusta" (a nickname given to him by the late Barry Sheene a former World Motorcycle Champion and Network Ten colleague).

Preceded by Bill Woods	RPM; Host; 2007–2008, 2011	Succeeded by Matthew White
Preceded by program started	Inside Supercars; Host; 2015–present	Succeeded by incumbent
