= Tony Caine =

Australian rugby league footballer

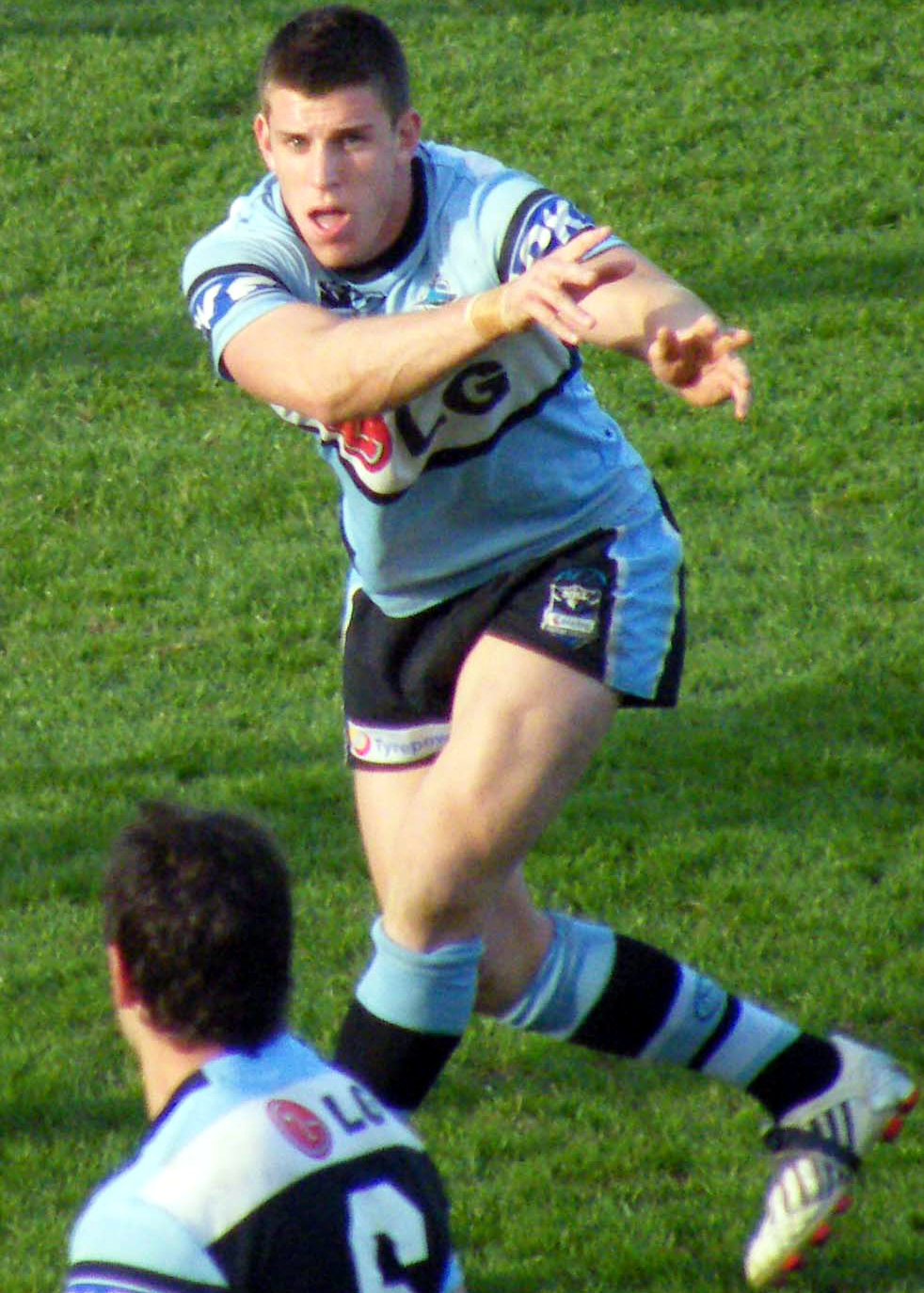

Personal information
- Full name: Tony Caine
- Born: 15 October 1986 (age 40) Westmead, New South Wales, Australia

Playing information
- Height: 173 cm (5 ft 8 in)
- Weight: 74 kg (11 st 9 lb; 163 lb)
- Position: bench/Hooker
Club
| Years | Team | Pld | T | G | FG | P |
|---|---|---|---|---|---|---|
| 2006 | Cronulla Sharks | 1 | 0 | 0 | 0 | 0 |
| 2007 | St. George Illawarra | 9 | 0 | 0 | 0 | 0 |
| 2009 | Cronulla Sharks | 6 | 0 | 0 | 0 | 0 |
| | Total | 16 | 0 | 0 | 0 | 0 |
Representative
| Years | Team | Pld | T | G | FG | P |
| 2007 | NSW Residents | 1 | 2 | 0 | 0 | 8 |
- Relatives: Jess Caine (brother); Joel Caine (brother)

Tony Caine (born 15 October 1986), is an Australian former rugby league football player. He played in just 16 games in the National Rugby League in 2006, 2007 and 2009 for the Cronulla-Sutherland Sharks and St George Illawarra Dragons. He is the younger brother of fellow NRL player, Joel Caine.

== Playing career ==
Caine began playing rugby league for the Gymea Gorillas before moving to De La Salle Caringbah. He attended Endeavour Sports High School where he played rugby league in the Arrive Alive Cup. He was signed by the Cronulla-Sutherland Sharks. In 2006, he began the season in the Sharks premier league side where he scored eleven tries. Caine was called up to the Shark's NRL premiership side on the bench in round twelve against the New Zealand Warriors. Caine attempted a kick in play which was charged down by Warriors prop Steve Price and Caine sustained a severe knee injury. Caine signed with the Dragons for the 2007 and 2008 seasons but, after playing in just nine games, the club released him in 2008 when he quit to rest for his troublesome knee. In 2009 he returned to the NRL, signing with his original club the Cronulla-Sutherland Sharks. After playing in just 6 more games for a total of just 16 NRL games, Caine retired due to complications with his knee injury.
