= Alison Drower =

Australian media personality (1964–2025)

- Born: Alison Louvaine Drower; 20 May 1964
- Died: 28 September 2025 (aged 61); Canberra, Australian Capital Territory, Australia
- Occupation: Media personality
- Spouse: Rick Bates
- Children: Zach Bates

Alison Louvaine Drower Bates (née Drower; 20 May 1964 – 28 September 2025) was an Australian television and radio presenter known for her work on MTV Australia and New Zealand, Triple M Sydney, and Southern Cross Austereo. She was also a reporter for the Supercars Championship and the motorsport program RPM.

Drower was married to rally driver Rick Bates, with whom she had a son, motorsports racer Zach Bates.

She died due to complications of a rare form of cancer at a Canberra hospital on 28 September 2025.
