= Jess Caine =

Australian rugby league footballer

Personal information
- Full name: Jesse Caine
- Born: 24 January 1985 (age 41)

Playing information
- Position: Centre, Second-row
Club
Years	Team	Pld	T	G	FG	P
2003	South Sydney	4	2	0	0	8
- Relatives: Joel Caine (brother); Tony Caine (brother)

Jess Caine is an Australian former professional rugby league footballer who played in the 2000s. He played for South Sydney in the NRL competition. He is the brother of former players Tony Caine and Joel Caine.

== Background ==
Caine played for the Cronulla-Sutherland Harold Matthews Cup team in 2001. Caine also represented the Australian Schoolboys in rugby league.

== Playing career ==
Caine made his first grade debut for South Sydney against the Parramatta Eels in round 12 2003 at Parramatta Stadium which ended in a 28–4 loss.

Caine played three further games for Souths in the 2003 NRL season. The club's round 13 loss against Melbourne, the 60–8 loss to North Queensland in round 24 and finally the club's 54–34 loss against Cronulla-Sutherland in round 25. Caine scored two tries off the bench in the game against Cronulla.

At the end of 2003, Souths finished last on the table and claimed the Wooden Spoon. The following year, Caine made no appearances for either the first or reserve grade team and was released by the club at the end of 2004.
