= RPM (TV series) =

- Genre: Motor sports program
- Presented by: Scott Mackinnon
- Starring: Alan Jones (Formula One specialist); Daryl Beattie (MotoGP specialist); Aaron Noonan (Supercars specialist)
- Country of origin: Australia
- Original language: English
- No. of seasons: 17

Production
- Production locations: Sydney, New South Wales
- Running time: ~ 90 minutes (including commercials) 1997 - 2008, 2011 ~ 60 minutes 2015 - 2019 ~ 30 minutes 2020

Original release
- Network: Network Ten
- Release: 30 March 1997 – 23 November 2008
- Network: One
- Release: 22 March – 16 November 2011
- Network: Network Ten
- Release: 8 March 2015 – 11 October 2020

Related
- Supercars Trackside; V8Xtra

RPM is an Australian motorsports and automotive television program that aired on Network Ten. The show originally aired from 1997 to 2008 on Ten, then in 2011 on sister channel One. It returned to Ten from 2015 to 2020. In the last few years, the show aired on Sunday afternoons but had held a variety of timeslots over the show's history.

The show's seasons ran from approximately March to November each year, in line with major events in the Australian calendar such as the Clipsal 500 and Bathurst 1000, as well as the Formula One and MotoGP seasons. The program covered all major forms of motorsport across Australia and the world, with a particular focus on Formula One, MotoGP, NASCAR, Supercars Championship as well as the Australian Rally Championship and World Rally Championship. In the last few years, the show has branched out to also cover more general motoring content such as car reviews.

== 1997–2008 version ==
RPM was launched in 1997 to accompany Network Ten's newly acquired coverage of Supercars, in conjunction with Foxtel. The original version of the show featured journalist Bill Woods and former MotoGP champion Barry Sheene as hosts. The show would normally air on Sunday afternoons, at varying timeslots and for various lengths, often depending on the network's other motorsport coverage. At the end of 2002, Sheene left the program due to serious health issues, and died in early 2003.

Following this, Woods hosted alone with the help of various reporters and specialists including Greg Rust, Neil Crompton and Daryl Beattie. For around six months in 2006, model Grace McClure co-hosted alongside Woods. In 2007, Rust took over from Woods as host, after Woods moved to a position hosting Ten Weekend News bulletins.

=== Format ===
Generally, each show began with the 'Circuit' segment, which involved Woods presenting the motorsport news of the past week. This segment included race highlights from the previous week, as well as updates of the progress of various Australians abroad at the time. 'Circuit' also covered rumours, such as potential driver moves for the following season in various categories.

Following this, there were usually around four segments, depending on the length of the timeslot. In later years, two of these were always taken up by updates from the MotoGP and Formula One series, either previewing or reviewing recent events. This generally involved the host discussing these events with the respective specialist for each form of motorsport. The other segments were usually taken up by either an interview with a driver or motorsport personality, a 'behind the scenes' report, a technical report, or features on other motorsport series, including smaller and/or junior series. Despite Network Ten and Fox Sports losing the broadcast rights to Supercars in 2006, the series was still regularly covered by the show.

=== Cancellation ===
In March 2009 it was announced that the show would not be returning. This was despite the simultaneous launch of One, a 24-hour sports channel created by the network, including expanded coverage of motorsport. However, the network decided to focus on individual motorsports and highlights packages on the new channel rather than a panel show.

== 2011 version ==
In March 2011, the show returned on One. Greg Rust returned as host, along with Daryl Beattie as the MotoGP specialist. The only change to the line-up was the addition of Craig Baird, who replaced Cameron McConville as the Formula One specialist, after McConville was removed from the network's motorsport coverage during the show's hiatus.

=== Format ===
The 2011 version of the show, recorded live, featured a mix of interviews and pre-recorded stories. The 2011 version moved away from the traditional Sunday afternoon timeslot to air on Tuesday or Wednesday nights. The show used Skype for some of its interviews, such as with F1 correspondent James Allen. The show also featured in-studio interviews, particularly with local Supercars drivers or other Network Ten personalities.

The show added some new segments, such as 'RPM Retro', usually featuring clips of Bill Woods or Barry Sheene from past episodes of the show, and prominently featured the latest betting odds due to a sponsorship deal with a bookmaker.

The show also added some general motoring segments, such as tips for safe driving on public roads.

=== Cancellation ===
In early 2012, it was announced the show would not be returning. This followed One's change of strategy in mid-2011, moving away from being a predominantly sports network to focus on general entertainment content.

== 2015 version ==
The show returned on 8 March 2015, following Network Ten regaining the rights to televise Supercars, in conjunction with Foxtel. With Rust leaving the network, Matt White took over as host, joined by Aaron Noonan, Alan Jones and Daryl Beattie, who became the only co-host involved in all three versions of the show. Former Formula One and current FIA World Endurance Championship driver Mark Webber appeared on the show as a special guest host in the first episode of both 2015 and 2016.

The show is repeated multiple times during the week on One.

Since March 2020, the 2015 version is a half hour show, instead of an hour long show.

In February 2021, the show would also not be returning again for the 3rd time.

=== Format ===
The 2015 version follows a similar format to 2011, with a mix of segments that include both motorsport and a wider motoring focus, and a variety of guests including those from outside the motorsport world. In 2015, the 'Battle of Bathurst' was a recurring segment, challenging various guests, usually current Supercars drivers, to set a laptime on the Mount Panorama Circuit on a simulator and the rFactor game in the studio. Chaz Mostert, the 2014 Bathurst 1000 champion, finished the year on top of the guest leaderboard. In 2016, the series extended from 60 to 90-minute episodes. The first half-hour of the show is branded as RPM GP.

== Hosts ==
Emboldened text indicates a current host or co-host.

- Bill Woods – (1997–2006)
- Barry Sheene – (1997–2002)
- Grace McClure – (2006)
- Greg Rust – (2007–2008, 2011)
- Matthew White – (2015–2020)
- Scott Mackinnon – (2020)

== Co-hosts ==
The co-hosts are usually specialised in a particular area of motorsport.

- Neil Crompton – (Supercars and Formula 1 specialist, 2002–2006)
- Daryl Beattie – (MotoGP specialist, 2003–2008, 2011, 2015–2020)
- Cameron McConville – (Formula 1 specialist, 2007–2008)
- Craig Baird – (Formula 1 specialist, 2011)
- Mark Larkham – (Supercars specialist, 2015–2018)
- Alan Jones – (Formula 1 specialist, 2015–2020)
- Aaron Noonan – (Supercars specialist, 2018–2020)
- Kate Peck – (Motorsport reporter, 2018–2020)
- Garth Tander – (Supercars driver/panelist, 2019–2020)
- Michael Caruso – (Supercars driver/panelist, 2019–2020)

== Reporters ==
As well as the studio hosts, RPM has a number of roving reporters that provide interviews and features, particularly of overseas events.

- James Allen – (Formula 1 correspondent)
- Tom Clarkson – (Formula 1 correspondent)
- Sam Charlwood – (Test Drive reporter, MotoGP host)

== Former contributors ==
- Grant Denyer
- Leigh Diffey
- Alison Drower
- Kylie King
- Will McCloy
- Mark Oastler
- Steve Parrish
- John Smailes
- Peter Windsor
- Mark Howard

== Awards and nominations ==
| Year | Award | Category | Result |
|---|---|---|---|
| 2006 | Logie Awards | Most Popular Sports Program | Nominated |
| 2007 | Logie Awards | Most Popular Sports Program | Nominated |

== See also ==
- List of longest running Australian television series
