= Mark Howard (broadcaster) =

Australian sports journalist, presenter and commentator

- Born: Mark Richard Howard; 23 October 1973 (age 53); Melbourne, Victoria, Australia
- Other names: Howie, H, Howard, The Australian Man
- Occupations: Cricket, Australian Rules Football commentator
- Years active: 2001−present
- Employer: Fox Sports

Mark Richard Howard (born 23 October 1973) is an Australian television presenter and journalist with Fox Sports after previously hosting, presenting and reporting on various events on Ten Sport for over a decade.

After a brief stint at the Seven Network, Howard joined Network Ten in 2005, employed for the network's award-winning V8 Supercar coverage for two years.

In 2008, Howard joined Network Ten's AFL team as a boundary rider; during this time he covered the 100th goal in a season by Hawthorn's Lance Franklin and co-hosted the 2008 Brownlow Medal "Red Carpet" for the network.

In 2009, he became the main correspondent for multi-channel (sports channel) One. This major role finished at the end of the 2011 AFL season when the network lost the rights to Aussie rules football. He co-hosted The Game Plan with Scott Cummings and Wayne Carey.

Howard is currently a commentator for Fox Cricket, where he commentates Test, ODI and T20I matches as well as the Big Bash League.

Howard also commentates AFL games for Fox Footy and Triple M. He currently hosts his own podcast, known as the Howie Games, where he interviews all manner of guests across the Australian and international sporting landscapes, among other topics.

On 25 April 2023, Howard commentated his first game in the Indian Premier League for Star Sports during a match between the Mumbai Indians and the Gujarat Titans.

Growing up Howard lived in Sydney before moving to small Victorian town of Tyers. He attended secondary school at Gippsland Grammar School.
