= Supercars Life =

Australian television series

- Genre: Motor racing program Observational documentary
- Country of origin: Australia
- Original language: English
- No. of seasons: 4
- No. of episodes: 54

Production
- Executive producer: Ryan Sanderson
- Producer: AME Management
- Running time: 30 minutes (including commercials)

Original release
- Network: Fox Sports, Kayo Sports
- Release: 26 March 2015 – present

Related
- V8 Life; Inside Supercars

Supercars Life is an Australian television series based on the Supercars Championship that airs on Fox Sports.

== Format ==
The series features a combination of behind-the-scenes footage, interviews and off-track features. This includes fly on the wall footage of team operations on a race weekend as well as features on the personal lives of drivers away from the track. In each episode, a different selection of teams or drivers from the Supercars Championship are featured. Twenty episodes were produced in 2015, spread throughout the year in conjunction with the 2015 championship. Twenty further episodes were commissioned for the series' second season in 2016. In 2017, the series extended to one hour episodes, at the same time reducing from 20 to 13 episodes in the year.

The show is produced by AME Management, with the support of Fox Sports. AME had in 2014 produced a similar series for 7mate, V8 Life. As opposed to the wider focus of Inside Supercars, the six episodes of V8 Life solely focused on the operations of the Holden Racing Team.

== History ==
In late 2013 it was announced that Fox Sports, in a shared deal with Network Ten, had acquired the broadcast rights for the series, that was then known as V8 Supercars, as of the 2015 season. To accompany their new coverage of the category, in early 2015 Fox Sports launched both this series as well as the panel-based discussion series Inside Supercars. Supercars Life was first aired on 26 March 2015, in the build-up to the second event of the 2015 season; the Tyrepower Tasmania Super Sprint. The inaugural episode featured the Triple Eight Race Engineering and Prodrive Racing Australia rivalry at the 2015 Clipsal 500 Adelaide, including interviews with team principals Roland Dane and Tim Edwards, as well as a feature on Scott McLaughlin. The series also featured these two teams for their coverage of the 2015 Supercheap Auto Bathurst 1000, providing an insight into the key race strategies and decisions for both teams. The series' first episode in 2016 featured a season preview as well as a feature on Will Davison and his friendship with 2016 Dakar Rally winner Toby Price. As of Season 2, episodes are also repeated in New Zealand on Sky Sport. The third season once again opened with a championship preview, with the series also to include features on former champions Russell Ingall and Mark Skaife.

In 2018 and 2019, Supercars Life segments were embedded into race weekend broadcasts rather than airing as separate programmes. From 2019 segments were uploaded to the Fox Sports-owned streaming service Kayo Sports. In 2020, the show returned in a dedicated timeslot with seven dedicated episodes scheduled on Fox Sports and Kayo.

== Episodes ==
=== Season 1 ===
Ep #	Airdate	Featured event	Featured teams	Featured drivers
1	26 March 2015	2015 Clipsal 500 Adelaide	Prodrive Racing Australia and Triple Eight Race Engineering	Scott McLaughlin
2	16 April 2015	2015 Tyrepower Tasmania Super Sprint	Holden Racing Team and Nissan Motorsport	Rick Kelly and Todd Kelly
3	30 April 2015	n/a	n/a	Michael Caruso, James Courtney, Lee Holdsworth, Scott McLaughlin, James Moffat, Jack Perkins, Scott Pye and Ash Walsh
4	14 May 2015	n/a	n/a	Will Davison, Scott Pye, and Jamie Whincup
5	4 June 2015	2015 Ubet Perth Super Sprint	Erebus Motorsport	Will Davison, Scott Pye and Ash Walsh
6	18 June 2015	2015 NP300 Navara Winton Super Sprint	Holden Racing Team and Nissan Motorsport	Lee Holdsworth and Craig Lowndes
7	9 July 2015	2015 Skycity Triple Crown	Brad Jones Racing and Rod Nash Racing	David Reynolds
8	30 July 2015	2015 Castrol Edge Townsville 400	Holden Racing Team and Prodrive Racing Australia	David Reynolds
9	13 August 2015	n/a	Garry Rogers Motorsport	Craig Lowndes, Jamie Whincup and Dale Wood
10	20 August 2015	2015 Coates Hire Ipswich Super Sprint	Garry Rogers Motorsport and Triple Eight Race Engineering	n/a
11	3 September 2015	n/a	Prodrive Racing Australia	Michael Caruso, Lee Holdsworth and James Moffat
12	10 September 2015	2015 Sydney Motorsport Park Super Sprint	Nissan Motorsport	Chaz Mostert
13	24 September 2015	Compilation episode (Episodes 1-12)		
14	1 October 2015	2015 Wilson Security Sandown 500	Holden Racing Team	James Courtney, Russell Ingall, Jack Perkins and David Reynolds
15	8 October 2015	n/a	Holden Racing Team, Prodrive Racing Australia and Triple Eight Race Engineering	Mark Winterbottom
16	22 October 2015	2015 Supercheap Auto Bathurst 1000	Prodrive Racing Australia and Triple Eight Race Engineering	n/a
17	5 November 2015	2015 Castrol Gold Coast 600	Brad Jones Racing, DJR Team Penske and Walkinshaw Racing	n/a
18	19 November 2015	2015 ITM 500 Auckland	Garry Rogers Motorsport and Tekno Autosports	Scott McLaughlin and Shane van Gisbergen
19	3 December 2015	2015 WD-40 Phillip Island Super Sprint	Erebus Motorsport, Holden Racing Team and Rod Nash Racing	Will Davison, David Reynolds and Garth Tander
20	17 December 2015	2015 Coates Hire Sydney 500	Prodrive Racing Australia and Triple Eight Race Engineering	Craig Lowndes and Mark Winterbottom

=== Season 2 ===
Ep #	Airdate	Featured event	Featured teams	Featured drivers
1	2 March 2016	n/a	Triple Eight Race Engineering	Will Davison, Chaz Mostert, Shane van Gisbergen and Mark Winterbottom
2	30 March 2016	2016 Clipsal 500 Adelaide	DJR Team Penske and Garry Rogers Motorsport	n/a
3	13 April 2016	2016 Tyrepower Tasmania SuperSprint	Team 18 and Erebus Motorsport	Aaren Russell
4	4 May 2016	2016 WD-40 Phillip Island SuperSprint	Nissan Motorsport	Michael Caruso and Dale Wood
5	18 May 2016	2016 Perth SuperSprint	Rod Nash Racing and Super Black Racing	Chaz Mostert, Chris Pither and Mark Winterbottom
6	1 June 2016	2016 Woodstock Winton SuperSprint	Brad Jones Racing	n/a
7	15 June 2016	n/a	n/a	Renee Gracie, Andre Heimgartner and Mark Winterbottom
8	29 June 2016	2016 CrownBet Darwin Triple Crown	Prodrive Racing Australia	Cameron Waters and Mark Winterbottom
9	6 July 2016	n/a	n/a	Craig Lowndes
10	20 July 2016	2016 Castrol Edge Townsville 400	Holden Racing Team	James Courtney and Garth Tander
11	10 August 2016	2016 Coates Hire Ipswich SuperSprint	Garry Rogers Motorsport	n/a
12	24 August 2016	n/a	n/a	Shae Davies, David Reynolds and Jamie Whincup
13	7 September 2016	2016 Red Rooster Sydney SuperSprint	Nissan Motorsport	n/a
14	14 September 2016	n/a	n/a	Will Davison, Jack Le Brocq, Cameron Waters and Jonathon Webb
15	28 September 2016	2016 Wilson Security Sandown 500	Team 18 and Tekno Autosports	Lee Holdsworth
16	5 October 2016	n/a	Supergirls	Craig Lowndes, Scott McLaughlin, Chaz Mostert, Mark Winterbottom
17	19 October 2016	2016 Supercheap Auto Bathurst 1000	Triple Eight Race Engineering	n/a
18	2 November 2016	2016 Castrol Gold Coast 600	DJR Team Penske	n/a
19	30 November 2016	2016 ITM Auckland SuperSprint	Garry Rogers Motorsport and Super Black Racing	Scott McLaughlin
20	14 December 2016	2016 Coates Hire Sydney 500	Holden Racing Team and Triple Eight Race Engineering	n/a

== See also ==
- List of Australian television series
- List of longest-running Australian television series
