= Tim Gossage =

Australian sports journalist

Tim Gossage (born 27 February 1965, in Perth) is an Australian sports commentator and Australian rules football coach based in Perth, Western Australia.

== Media ==
Gossage joined Network 10 in Perth in 1990.

During his time at Ten, he'd featured on the network's Melbourne Cup Coverage & an AFL commentator or boundary rider on Ten and Fox Sports, mainly commentating AFL games involving the Fremantle Dockers and West Coast Eagles.

In 2009, Gossage briefly involved with 3AW Football coverage in place of the recently deceased Clinton Grybas while involved with sister station 6PR Football coverage.

He also presents the sport news on the Perth edition of Ten News in addition to hosting a local weekly football show, The Western Front.

Gossage was coach of the Subiaco Lions Colts (under 19) team taking over from Scott Watters who became coach of Subiaco's league team. In 2007 Gossage led the Subiaco colts team to the finals for the first time in ten years. Gossage resigned as coach in August 2008 citing family and personal reasons.

Gossage has also worked on radio stations Hot FM, Racing Radio and Nova 93.7.

In 2009, Gossage's contract with Racing Radio was not renewed due to cost-saving measures by the station, General manager of Racing & Wagering Western Australia Ken Norquay said "The decision is not a reflection on Tim’s performance as host for the past three years, but simply RWWA is not in a position to have the show anchored by the services of a high profile sports presenter in these economic times".

Gossage suffered a fractured skull and a blood clot when he fell from a stage while preparing to host an event at the Burswood Entertainment Complex in July 2009. He returned to work three weeks later.

Gossage presented sport on 10 News for the majority of his 30 years at Channel 10 before departing in 2020 due to cost cuts at the Network 10, also known as "Goss", he is currently involved with radio stations SEN and 6PR while he is also a auctioner.
