= V8Xtra =

- 2013–2014 title card
- Genre: Television news magazine
- Presented by: Neil Crompton
- Starring: Mark Skaife; Mark Larkham
- Country of origin: Australia
- Original language: English
- No. of seasons: 8

Production
- Production location: Sydney
- Running time: 30–60 minutes
- Production company: V8 Supercar Television

Original release
- Network: Seven Network (2007–2014); 7mate (2013–2014)
- Release: 5 May 2007 – 6 December 2014

Related
- Inside Supercars; Supercars Life

V8Xtra was an Australian V8 Supercar focused sports panel television program that aired weekly on the Seven Network from 5 May 2007 to 6 December 2014. It was hosted by former racing driver Neil Crompton and featured former drivers Mark Skaife and Mark Larkham as analysts. Each episode featured previews or reviews of events, as well as interviews with drivers and features on teams.

== Broadcast ==
The series aired between around March and December each year, in line with the V8 Supercar calendar. It aired in different timeslots during the show's history, however in its final years was normally a half hour show on Saturdays at 1pm. It was occasionally aired on 7mate, a digital channel owned by the Seven Network.

== Demise ==
In 2015, the program was superseded by Inside Supercars, which premiered on 3 March 2015 on Fox Sports 5, as the Seven Network lost the broadcast rights to V8 Supercar at the end of 2014.

== See also ==
- List of Australian television series
- Shannons Legends of Motorsport
