= Liam Santamaria =

Australian basketball player

Personal information
- Born: 17 December 1980 (age 45) Melbourne, Victoria, Australia
- Listed height: 183 cm (6 ft 0 in)

Career information
- Playing career: 2001–2008
- Position: Guard

Career history
- 2001–2002: Victoria Titans
- 2005–2008: Diamond Valley Eagles

Liam Santamaria (born 17 December 1980) is an Australian former professional basketball player who is a writer and broadcaster for the National Basketball League (NBL). He serves as the general manager of recruitment for the NBL's Next Stars player development program.

Santamaria was born in Melbourne, Victoria, and aspired to play basketball since his childhood. He played for the Victoria Titans of the NBL as a development player during the 2001–02 season and averaged 1.6 points in 10 games. Santamaria played for the Diamond Valley Eagles of the Big V from 2005 to 2008.

Santamaria retired from playing in 2008. He desired to still be involved with basketball and began his writing career in 2013. Santamaria made his first appearance as a television commentator in 2015. Santamaria was a host of commentary show NBL Overtime.
