= Football's Greatest =

- Genre: Sport
- Created by: Pitch International
- Country of origin: United Kingdom
- Original language: English
- No. of episodes: 66

Production
- Executive producers: Paul McGrath; Jon Owen; Hans Duikersloot
- Editors: Matt Bowen; Crispin Holland
- Camera setup: Daniel Vitalis
- Running time: 23 minutes

Original release
- Network: Sky Sports HD 1/2
- Release: 10 June – 11 July 2010

Football's Greatest is a TV series that started on 10 June 2010 and finished on 11 July 2010 on Sky Sports for the World Cup. There are 26 shows in total all narrated by Richard Keys, 25 featuring one footballer for each show. The first episode, The Contenders, is about players that did not make the following shows, though are still notable.

The series was then followed by Football's Greatest Managers around Christmas 2011, running to a similar format. This series was narrated by Gabriel Clarke and features shows for José Mourinho, Bill Shankly, Alex Ferguson, Bob Paisley, Giovanni Trapattoni, Fabio Capello, Arrigo Sacchi, Rinus Michels, Mário Zagallo and Ottmar Hitzfeld.

Ten for Football's Greatest International Teams: West Germany (1972–1974), Netherlands (1974 and 1988), Brazil (1958/1962, 1970 and 1982), France (1984 and 1998–2000), Hungary (1954) and Spain (2008–2012).

Sixteen for Football's Greatest Teams: Chelsea, Manchester United, Barcelona, Arsenal, Bayern Munich, Real Madrid (1954–1966 and 1996–2003), Ajax, Benfica, Celtic, Juventus, Liverpool, Milan, Santos, Red Star Belgrade and Nottingham Forest.

Eight for Football's Greatest International Rivalries: England v Scotland, Holland v Germany, Brazil v Argentina, England v Germany, Italy v France & Yugoslavia, England v Argentina & Czech Republic v Slovenia, Portugal v Spain & Uruguay v Argentina and Turkey v Greece & Sweden v Denmark.

== List of episodes ==
The first episode, The Contenders, featured Ryan Giggs, Paolo Rossi, Gheorghe Hagi, Luís Figo, Denis Law, Roberto Baggio, Emilio Butragueño, Thierry Henry, Bobby Moore, George Weah, Kaká, Dino Zoff, Lothar Matthäus, Eric Cantona, Hugo Sánchez, Hristo Stoichkov, Dennis Bergkamp, Steven Gerrard, Franco Baresi, Cristiano Ronaldo, Karl-Heinz Rummenigge, Lionel Messi, Sócrates, David Beckham and Romário.

Episode	Season	Player	Nationality	Date of episode
1	1	The Contenders		10 June 2010
2	1	Bobby Charlton	England	11 June 2010
3	1	Gerd Müller	Germany	13 June 2010
4	1	Ruud Gullit	Netherlands	14 June 2010
5	1	Eusébio	Portugal	15 June 2010
6	1	Rivellino	Brazil	16 June 2010
7	1	Michel Platini	France	17 June 2010
8	1	Peter Schmeichel	Denmark	19 June 2010
9	1	Garrincha	Brazil	20 June 2010
10	1	Kenny Dalglish	Scotland	21 June 2010
11	1	Raúl	Spain	22 June 2010
12	1	Johan Cruyff	Netherlands	24 June 2010
13	1	Ronaldinho	Brazil	25 June 2010
14	1	Alfredo Di Stéfano	Argentina	27 June 2010
15	1	Marco van Basten	Netherlands	28 June 2010
16	1	Paolo Maldini	Italy	29 June 2010
17	1	Franz Beckenbauer	Germany	30 June 2010
18	1	Zinedine Zidane	France	1 July 2010
19	1	Zico	Brazil	2 July 2010
20	1	Michael Laudrup	Denmark	3 July 2010
21	1	Ronaldo	Brazil	4 July 2010
22	1	Gabriel Batistuta	Argentina	5 July 2010
23	1	Ferenc Puskás	Hungary	6 July 2010
24	1	George Best	Northern Ireland	7 July 2010
25	1	Diego Maradona	Argentina	10 July 2010
26	1	Pelé	Brazil	11 July 2010
27	2	Dennis Bergkamp	Netherlands	18 April 2014
28	2	Andrés Iniesta	Spain	20 April 2014
29	2	Clarence Seedorf	Netherlands	21 April 2014
30	2	Alan Shearer	England	22 April 2014
31	2	Cristiano Ronaldo	Portugal	23 April 2014
32	2	Thierry Henry	France	24 April 2014
33	2	Luís Figo	Portugal	25 April 2014
34	2	Lionel Messi	Argentina	26 April 2014
35	2	Steven Gerrard	England	27 April 2014
36	2	Ryan Giggs	Wales	28 April 2014
37	3	Franco Baresi	Italy	30 August 2016
38	3	Alessandro Del Piero	Italy	31 August 2016
39	3	George Weah	Liberia	01 September 2016
40	3	Gheorghe Hagi	Romania	02 September 2016
41	3	Kaká	Brazil	05 September 2016
42	3	Andrea Pirlo	Italy	06 September 2016
43	3	Hristo Stoichkov	Bulgaria	07 September 2016
44	3	Iker Casillas	Spain	08 September 2016
45	3	Xavi	Spain	09 September 2016
46	3	Rivaldo	Brazil	12 September 2016
47	4	David Villa	Spain	
48	4	Ian Rush	Wales	
49	4	Lothar Matthäus	Germany	
50	4	Patrick Vieira	France	
51	4	Cafu	Brazil	
52	4	Roberto Baggio	Italy	
53	4	Roberto Carlos	Brazil	
54	4	Carles Puyol	Spain	
55	4	Samuel Eto'o	Cameroon	
56	4	Marcel Desailly	France	
57	5	Didier Deschamps	France	
58	5	Fernando Hierro	Spain	
59	5	Jürgen Klinsmann	Germany	
60	5	Ronald Koeman	Netherlands	
61	5	Jean-Pierre Papin	France	
62	5	Graeme Souness	Scotland	
63	5	Karl-Heinz Rummenigge	Germany	
64	5	Ruud van Nistelrooy	Netherlands	
65	5	Gianluca Vialli	Italy	
66	5	Xabi Alonso	Spain	
