= Matthew White (journalist) =

Australian journalist (born 1970)

- Born: Matthew White; 16 April 1970 (age 56); Sydney, New South Wales, Australia
- Occupations: Television executive; sports broadcaster; television presenter; journalist
- Years active: 1990s–present
- Employers: Network 10 (1993–2004, 2014–2020); Seven Network (2004–2014, 2026–present); Sports Entertainment Network (2021–2025)
- Television: Sports Tonight; Seven News; Sportsworld; Today Tonight (East Coast edition); RPM

Matthew White (born 16 April 1970) is an Australian media personality, who has worked across television, radio and print for 30 years, he has worked as a sports journalist as a commentator and broadcaster, television executive, television presenter and radio host and journalist.

== Career ==
White worked at Network 10, where he returned to in 2014. He has previously been Network 10's Head of Sport and host of the motorsports panel show RPM.

Prior to his association with Network 10, he worked at the Seven Network for a decade, where he was a host and commentator for various Seven Sport events, presented sport on Seven News Sydney, and presented current affairs program Today Tonight between 2008 and 2012.

Prior to joining Seven in mid-2004, he was originally at Network 10, where he was a host on the original Sports Tonight and was involved in the Australian Grand Prix, V8 Supercars and Melbourne Cup coverage for the network.

== Early journalism ==
White began his journalism career at a local newspaper in Manly before moving to radio and joining Newcastle's New FM to present breakfast news. He moved to television in 1992 when he became weekend sports presenter for NBN News. and then had a stint at radio Triple M.

White joined Network 10 as a sport reporter. He became weekend host of the network’s flagship sports program Sports Tonight in 1993. During his time at Ten, White covered sports including Supercars, Big Bash League, Formula One, the Spring Racing Carnival and the AFL. He was a commentator for the Supercars in 2002 and 2003. He left Sports Tonight and Network 10 in mid-2004.

=== Move to Seven Sport ===
White joined the Seven Network in mid-2004 and became a major presenter in the Seven Sport stable. White was involved in the network’s 2004 Summer Olympics coverage, their Australian Open coverage, and was host of Seven’s (now-defunct) flagship sports program, Sportsworld. He also hosted evening events from Seven's main studio during the 2008 Summer Olympics.

Following Seven attaining the Supercars rights in 2007, he hosted and commentated their coverage alongside Neil Crompton, Mark Skaife, Mark Larkham and Mark Beretta until mid-2014.

=== News and current affairs ===
Since arriving at Seven, White presented sport on Sydney's weeknight edition of Seven News, from mid-2004 until mid-2008.

On 13 August 2007, White joined Melissa Doyle as host of Sunrise filling in for David Koch. He filled in as co-host of Sunrise over the summer period, while David Koch was on holidays. White co-hosted alongside Melissa Doyle and Kylie Gillies. Additionally he presented weekend editions of Seven News in Sydney over the 2007/08 Christmas/New Year period.

On 30 September 2008, the Seven Network announced that White would replace Anna Coren as the presenter of the East Coast edition of Today Tonight. This meant he had to leave his regular position as sport presenter on Seven News, although he continued with his Supercars commitments. In November 2012, White resigned as presenter of Today Tonight after four years to pursue other roles at the Seven Network. In August 2013, White was appointed presenter of Seven Afternoon News with Melissa Doyle.

In 2009, White was a competitor on Dancing with the Stars while continuing his position at Today Tonight. He finished in second position. White hosted Carols in the Domain in 2012 with Natalie Barr and in 2013 with Melissa Doyle.

=== Return to 10 ===
In July 2014, White returned to Network 10 after spending a decade with the Seven Network. He covered the 2014 Commonwealth Games for Ten.

Following Ten winning the shared broadcast rights with Fox Sports to Supercars in 2015, White became a host of the network's coverage alongside Mark Webber and Aaron Noonan, as well as its Formula One coverage, replacing Greg Rust. White also hosted a revived version of the motorsports panel show RPM. He also hosted Wallabies Rugby Union matches on 10.

White was an occasional co-host on The Project. In May 2018, White was appointed Head of Sport at Network 10, replacing David Barham. In May 2020 White was made redundant from Network 10 due to a series of cutbacks by the network.

=== Radio ===
White hosted Mornings with Matt White on the Sports Entertainment Network from 2021 until 2025.

=== Return to Seven ===
In January 2026, it was announced that White would return to the Seven Network as the weekend sports presenter on 7 News Sydney, and to anchor its 2026 Rugby League World Cup coverage which the network has the broadcasting rights to. He will also appear on the network's rugby league analysis show The Agenda Setters: Rugby League.

== Personal life ==
White is married and has two children and lives in Sydney.
