= Gordon Bray =

Australian sports commentator (born 1949)

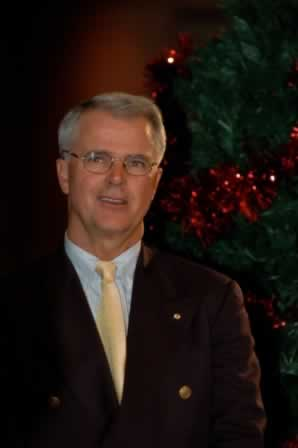
- Gordon Bray: December 2005
- Born: 23 June 1949 (age 77)
- Occupations: Sports commentator Sports journalist
- Employer: Network Ten

Gordon Timothy Bray AM (born 23 June 1949) is an Australian sports commentator and sports journalist. He is colloquially known as "The Voice of Rugby".

== Early life ==
Brought up in the Sydney suburb of Burwood and educated at Homebush Boys High School, Bray was a talented schoolboy rugby union footballer representing NSW Combined High Schools and subsequently Eastern Suburbs.

== Career ==
Bray can lay claim to being Australia's longest serving active sports commentator having commenced his broadcasting career in 1969 with ABC Sport in Sydney. He spent 25 years commentating for the ABC, consisting of 21 years in Sydney and four years posting in Hobart, calling more than 20 sports at international level. He then spent 16 months at the Network Ten followed by 16 years at the Seven Network. He has also worked for Fox Sports. Bray has covered 12 Summer and Winter Olympic Games and in 1976 at Montreal introduced the first "live" overseas colour sporting transmission into Australia for the combined Australian Television commentary team. He also commentated at five Commonwealth Games, and has called nearly 400 rugby internationals, and covered all 10 Rugby World Cups.

In April 2013, Bray joined Network Ten for an eight year stint as its chief rugby commentator, after Ten acquired the rugby free-to-air broadcast rights.

Bray has written seven books on rugby, including best sellers 'The Australian Rugby Companion' and 'From the Ruck'. His latest book 'The Immortals of Australian Rugby Union' has gone to a second print run.

He is an active public speaker and master of ceremonies and also provides media training and mentoring.

In 2022, Bray provided a voice cameo for an episode of children's show Bluey, entitled "The Decider", in which he voiced himself commentating a rugby union game between Australia and New Zealand. In 2024, Bray called the Paris Olympic Games for Nine Radio and also commentated the start of the Rolex Sydney to Hobart Yacht Race for Channel 9.

Bray played himself as the match commentator in the movie "The Brighton Miracle" which celebrated Japan's extraordinary victory over two-time world champions South Africa at the 2015 Rugby World Cup.

== Honours and awards ==
In 1999 Gordon had a street named after him in Lidcombe NSW: Gordon Bray Circuit.

In 2000 Gordon Bray was awarded an Australian Sports Medal for his services as a sports commentator which included Australia's twin Rugby World Cup wins in 1991 and 1999, via television broadcasting.

In the June 2005 Queen's Birthday Honours List he was made a Member of the Order of Australia "For service to broadcasting as a sports commentator, to the promotion of Rugby Union football, and to the community".

He is also a past recipient of the prestigious Penguin Award for best TV Sports Presenter.

On 12 December 2021, Gordon Bray was inducted to the Sydney Cricket Ground Media Hall of Honour, added to the inaugural 15 media personalities who were first celebrated in 2014.

== Community work ==
Bray is an ambassador for Legacy Australia, a charity which supports Defence Force families in need. Legacy supported Gordon as a child after he lost his father at an early age.

He served as an Australia Day ambassador over two decades and is currently patron of Sunshine Coast Grammar's Rugby Academy led by All Black Hosea Gear.
