= Gameplan II =

Play-by-mail game

Gameplan II is a play-by-mail game published by Clemens and Associates.

== Gameplay ==
Gameplan II is a play-by-mail game in which players take on the role of head coach for one of 24 NFL teams, competing through a full football season of strategic play-calling and roster management. The game emphasizes detailed tactical decision-making—players program offensive and defensive strategies, including situational decisions like what to do on 4th down or in short-yardage scenarios. Gameplay is broken into specific categories, such as "first down out of field goal range," where coaches pre-select play sequences. During matches, the computer selects from these options based on the situation and player preferences. The league is divided into East and West, each with three divisions of four teams. The regular season consists of 14 games, followed by a playoff bracket including division winners and wildcard teams. Coaches choose from a wide array of offensive plays—six running and nine passing—and seven defensive formations like blitz and goal-line defense. After each season, players participate in a three-round draft to bring in rookies, free agents, or replacements for retired players, keeping team development and long-term planning central to success.

== Reception ==
Stewart Wieck reviewed Gameplan II in White Wolf #16 (June/July, 1989), rating it a 4 out of 5 and stated that "For a pure strategy game, Gameplan II is among the best I've played. However, diplomacy is noticeably lacking."

== Reviews ==
- D2 Report: The Play-by-Mail Gamer's Reading Companion
