= Tim Bailey =

Australian journalist

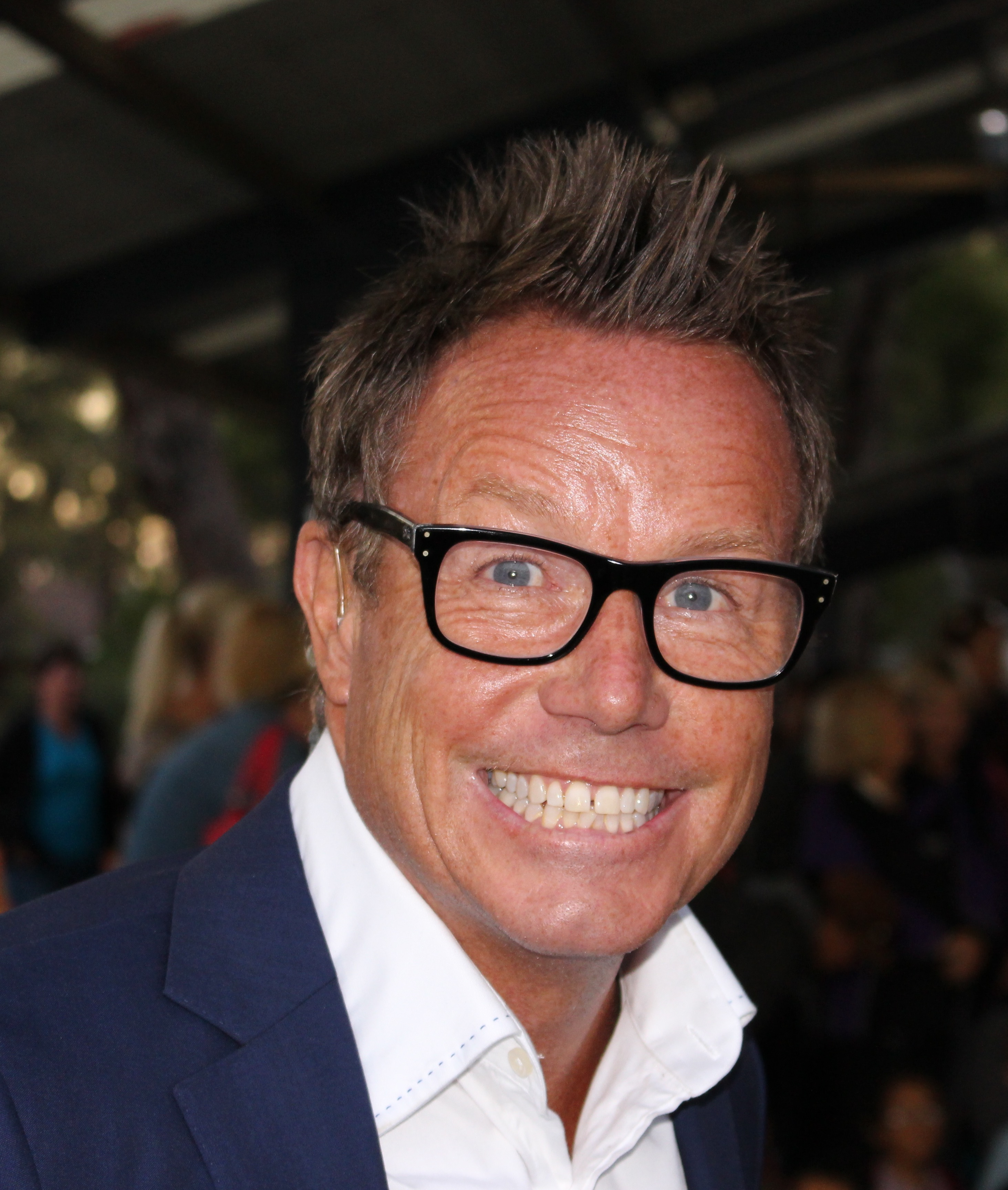
- Tim Bailey in 2014
- Born: 19 February 1963 (age 63); Hobart, Tasmania
- Occupations: Journalist; reporter; radio presenter; television presenter; weatherman
- Years active: 1980–2021
- Known for: Weather presenter for Channel 10 (1991–2020)
- Spouse: Samantha
- Children: 2

Tim Bailey (born 19 February 1963) is an Australian former journalist, radio and television presenter, sports reporter and weather reporter, best known for his more than 30-year association with Network 10.

== Biography and career ==
=== Early journalism career ===
Bailey was born in Hobart, Tasmania, on 19 February 1963, and started his career as a journalist with the newspaper Hobart Mercury, where two generations of his family had worked. Bailey covered industrial relations and environmental issues before moving into the sports department, covering cricket, football, golf and the Sydney to Hobart Yacht Race. He then headed to the Gold Coast, where he wrote for the Gold Coast Bulletin for four years and establishing his own news agency domestically and internationally.

=== Radio ===
He then entered a media career in radio with the Gold Coast Station Sea FM, later he worked in radio in Sydney as a sportscaster on network 2Day FM. His program was The Morning Crew with co-host Wendy Harmer.

=== Television ===
In 1990, he started in television as a reporter for Network Ten on Good Morning Australia with Kerri-Anne Kennerley and Mike Gibson. In 2000 he hosted The $20 Challenge.

In 1993 he began hosting a children's morning show called 'The Big Breakfast'.

=== Sports coverage ===
He subsequently made a return to Network Ten, initially taking up a television role on Good Morning Australia (GMA), before becoming a host and presenter on many programs including Totally Wild, The Chilli Factor, The Big Breakfast, Airtime Basketball and the Vodafone Beach Volleyball tour. His sports coverage has included the Commonwealth Games, Melbourne Cup, Bathurst 1000 and Indycar racing.

=== Weather presentation ===
Bailey remains best known for his long association with Network Ten starting in 1980, working as their weather presenter from 1991, and was renowned as being "Australia's most trusted weather man". He presented the weather on-location around New South Wales for 10 News First. Bailey also acted as a cover reporter for the network. Bailey was let go from his position in August 2020 as part of a large restructure at Network Ten. His redundancy took effect from 11 September 2020. Bailey stated of his sacking:

20 minutes after I was sacked from Channel 10, my phone rang, and before I had a chance to fall down, a bloke by the name of Benny Fordham picked me up. Him and his boss, who is the best wrangler of a Lazy Susan in Sydney – Tommy Malone – offered me a job. I am proud, pumped and privileged to be part of the family.

He also admitted that it had hit him 'right between the eyes, a knife through the back and through the heart, it's the best description of it. It was brutal and I was very, very sad.'

On 21 September 2020, he commenced presenting the weather for morning and drive programs on Sydney radio station 2GB until July 2021, where he decided to move to the Gold Coast.
