= The Game Plan (NRL) =

- Genre: Sport
- Directed by: Charles Anderson
- Presented by: Andrew Moore; Steve Roach; Joel Caine
- Country of origin: Australia
- Original language: English
- No. of seasons: 3
- No. of episodes: 87

Production
- Executive producer: David Barham
- Producer: Steven Hurson
- Editor: Jason Bond
- Camera setup: Multiple-camera setup
- Running time: 60 minutes (inc. commercial)

Original release
- Network: One (2011–2012, 2013); Network Ten (2012)
- Release: 10 March 2011 – 3 October 2013

The Game Plan was an Australian sports television program, that focused on the National Rugby League competition. It aired on One every Thursday night.

== Broadcast history ==
The show premiered on One on 10 March 2011, airing at 8:30pm in front of a live studio audience.

The show moved to its larger sister channel, Network Ten, on 21 June 2012 to target a broader audience. It aired in New South Wales and Queensland at 8:30pm, airing the same night on One at 10:30pm in Victoria, South Australia and Western Australia.

When the program returned in 2013, it went back to screening on One at the earlier time of 7:30pm and the studio audience removed from broadcasts. In October 2013, The Game Plan was axed by One, with the news being announced on 2GB.

== Hosts ==
- Steve Roach
- Andrew Moore
- Joel Caine

== See also ==
- List of Australian television series
