= 10 Drama =

Australian TV channel

- Logo used since 2025
- Country: Australia
- Broadcast area: Sydney, Melbourne, Brisbane, Adelaide, Perth, Darwin, Regional QLD, Northern NSW & Gold Coast, Southern NSW & ACT, Griffith, Broken Hill, Regional VIC, Tasmania, Eastern SA, Spencer Gulf, Central Australia, Regional WA
- Network: Network 10

Programming
- Language: English
- Picture format: 576i SDTV (Regional areas excluding Remote Eastern/Central); 1080i HDTV (Metro areas, some regional areas and Remote Eastern/Central)

Ownership
- Owner: Warner Bros. Discovery Asia-Pacific (Skydance Corporation)
- Parent: Network Ten Pty Limited
- Sister channels: Channel 10; 10 HD; 10 Comedy; Nickelodeon; You.tv; Gecko TV

History
- Launched: 26 March 2009; 17 years ago
- Replaced: 10 HD (HD channel space; 2007–2009, later relaunched on 2 March 2016)
- Replaced by: 10 Comedy (One SD)
- Former names: One HD (2009–2011); One (2011–2018); 10 Boss (2018); 10 Bold (2018–2024); 10 Bold Drama (2024–2025)

Links
- Website: 10.com.au

Availability

Terrestrial
- Freeview 10 metro (virtual): 12
- Freeview 10 Northern NSW & Gold Coast, Regional QLD, Southern NSW & ACT, Regional Victoria, 10 Tasmania (virtual): 53
- Freeview Seven Spencer Gulf SA/Broken Hill NSW (virtual): 52
- Freeview WIN/Seven Regional WA (virtual): 50
- Freeview 10 Darwin: 12
- Freeview 10 Central: 1

Streaming media
- 10

10 Drama is an Australian free-to-air digital television multichannel owned by Network 10. It originally launched on 26 March 2009 as One HD with a focus on broadcasting sports-based programming and events, but rebranded to One in April 2011 to include more scripted and adventure-based programming aimed at males between the ages of 25 and 54. As of October 2018, the channel now primarily broadcasts dramatic programming.

== History ==
=== Sports channel ===
The channel commenced broadcasting as One HD on 26 March 2009 at 7.00pm in Melbourne (due to live coverage of the Australian Football League) and at 7.30pm in Sydney, Brisbane, Adelaide and Perth. The channel, owned by Network 10, featured nonstop sport content including live sport, sports documentaries and sports-themed movies.

One initially broadcast in high definition on digital channels 1 and 11 with a standard-definition simulcast on digital channel 12 known as One SD or One Digital. At launch, One replaced the previous Ten HD service and a standard-definition simulcast of Ten HD called TenSD2.

One HD began broadcasting on Macquarie Media Group's owned and operated Southern Cross Ten regional television stations on digital channel 50 at 7.00pm on 2 July 2009. Tasmania did not broadcast it until 30 July 2009, and Mildura did not broadcast it until 1 December 2009.

The simulcast on digital channel 11 was later reallocated for Ten's standard-definition digital multichannel Eleven (now 10 Comedy) on 15 December 2010 in preparation for its launch on 11 January 2011. As a result, the channel's high definition simulcast was moved to channel 12, replacing the standard-definition simulcast.

In 2011, the channel began to dilute its all-sport format to include adventure-themed reality programming such as Ice Road Truckers and Black Gold, and a weekly feature-length movie or documentary, usually, but not limited to, a sporting theme. In April 2011, it was revealed that the channel would shift to a more broad general entertainment channel aimed towards a younger male demographic, whilst still featuring sports programming.

=== Sports and entertainment channel ===
It was confirmed on 4 April 2011 that due to unsupportable overheads associated with running the station as an "all-sport" channel, One HD would begin to air more general entertainment programming alongside sport, particularly shows aimed at an older male audience and would also be rebranded as One. The changes were intended to make the channel a greater competitor against 7mate, which has a similar scope, and took place on 8 May 2011.

One's updated schedule included factuals such as Everest: Beyond the Limit, Extreme Fishing with Robson Green, Airline, Long Way Round, Ice Road Truckers, An Idiot Abroad, Cops, dramas such as Terriers, Lights Out, Sons of Anarchy, Burn Notice, Breakout Kings and Psych and films such as The Last King of Scotland, 28 Weeks Later, Babylon AD, Jarhead, Pitch Black, Doom, Hitman and The Manchurian Candidate.

As a result of the revival of 10 HD on 2 March 2016, the channel was reduced to standard definition.

=== 10 Bold (2018–2024) ===
On 31 October 2018, One relaunched as 10 Boss, as part of a larger rebranding of Network 10. Chief content officer Beverley McGarvey described "Boss" as reflecting an overall "attitude" in its programming, exemplified by a focus on characters with "bold" personalities or could be reasonably described as being a "boss" (such as Judge Judy). 10 Boss primarily targets viewers over the age of 40, and focuses primarily on dramas (such as Madam Secretary and NCIS).

On 10 December 2018, the channel was renamed 10 Bold, due to trademark conflicts with Fairfax Media (which had completed its merger with Nine Entertainment Co.) and the Australian Financial Review publication Boss. A press release promoting the rebranding acknowledged the conflict, describing the change as being an "early Christmas present to Nine", and quipping that "it's better to be bold than bossy".

=== 10 Drama (2024–present) ===
On 5 June 2024, it was announced that the channel would rebrand as 10 Bold Drama on 12 June 2024, as part of a rebranding of Bold and Peach to include their main genres in their names.

On 30 June 2025, the channel shortened its name to 10 Drama as part of a rebranding of Network 10.

== Programming ==
The channel targets a broad range of viewers, broadcasting programs from Australia, New Zealand, the United Kingdom, Canada, and the United States, and complementing existing programming on Network 10. Programs aired on the channel are scripted and adventure-based programming aimed at males between the ages of 25 and 54, mix of genres, including reality, lifestyle, drama, classic sitcoms from the 60s, 70s and 80s, comedies, live sport and action films.

=== Current programming ===
==== Drama ====
- Blue Bloods
- Bull
- The Code
- Hawaii Five-0
- In the Dark
- JAG
- Law & Order: Special Victims Unit
- MacGyver (2016 TV series)
- NCIS
- NCIS: Los Angeles
- Numb3rs

==== Soap Opera ====
- The Bold and the Beautiful
- Days of Our Lives
- The Young and the Restless

==== Lifestyle ====
- Adventure Angler
- All 4 Adventure
- Escape with ET
- Fishing Edge
- I Fish
- Into Water and Beyond
- The Living Room
- The Offroad Adventure Show
- Pat Callinan's 4x4 Adventures
- Reel Action
- River to Reef
- What's Up Downunder

==== Sport ====
- A-League Men
- A-League Women
- Australia Cup

=== Former programming ===
==== Comedy ====
- An Idiot Abroad
- Back in the Game
- Common Law
- The Crazy Ones
- Dads
- Die on Your Feet
- Fast Forward
- Get Smart
- Hogan's Heroes
- The Last Man on Earth
- Last Man Standing
- The League
- M*A*S*H
- The Millers
- Psych
- Raising Hope
- Sex & Drugs & Rock & Roll
- Sirens
- Wedding Band
- Whose Line Is It Anyway?

==== Documentary ====
- 48 Hours
- Black Ops
- Bondi Rescue
- Great Bear Stakeout with Billy Connolly
- The Longest Day
- Madagascar
- Megafactories
- Megastructures
- MegaStructures Breakdown
- Moments of Impact
- Monkeys Revealed
- Nature's Great Events
- Ross Noble's Australian Trip
- Ross Kemp: Back on the Frontline
- Ross Kemp: Middle East
- Ross Kemp: Return to Afghanistan
- Ross Kemp in Search of Pirates
- Sport Science
- Totally Wild
- Vanity Fair Confidential
- Working With Dangerous Animals
- World's Busiest

==== Drama ====
- The Americans
- Awake
- Burn Notice
- CSI: Crime Scene Investigation
- CSI: Cyber
- CSI: Miami
- CSI: NY
- Diagnosis: Murder
- Elementary
- Extant
- Gang Related
- The Glades
- Graceland
- Highlander: The Series
- Homeland
- Jake and the Fatman
- The Killing
- L.A.'s Finest
- Legends
- MacGyver (1985 TV series)
- Madam Secretary
- Matlock
- The Mentalist
- Mr & Mrs Murder
- Nash Bridges
- NYC 22
- Ripper Street
- Rush
- Scorpion
- Sons of Anarchy
- Star Trek: Enterprise
- Star Trek: The Next Generation
- Star Trek: Voyager
- Those Who Kill
- Touch
- Tyrant
- Walker, Texas Ranger
- White Collar
- Zoo

==== Factual ====
- Car Crash Britain: Caught on Camera
- Emergency Search & Rescue
- Gold Coast Cops
- Territory Cops

==== Lifestyle ====
- 4WD Touring Australia
- Big Fish Small Boats
- Blokesworld
- Car Torque
- Driving Wars
- ETs Fishing Classics
- Extreme Boats Big Angry Fish
- Extreme Collectors
- Extreme Fishing with Robson Green
- Far Flung with Gary Mehigan
- Freddie Flintoff: Lord of the Fries
- Hardliners
- The Home Team
- International Fishing Series
- Just Go
- Let's Do Coffee
- Merv Hughes Fishing
- Ozzie Holiday
- Reel Rock
- Robson Green Extreme Fisherman
- Robson's Extreme Fishing Challenge
- Temporary Australians

==== Light entertainment ====
- Can of Worms
- Darren & Brose
- The Doctors
- Dr. Phil
- Late Show with David Letterman
- Talkin' 'Bout Your Gen

==== Game shows ====
- Celebrity Name Game
- Family Feud (Network 10 simulcast)
- Jeopardy! (2008–2009 series only)
- Pointless (Network 10 simulcast)

==== News and current affairs ====
- The Bolt Report

==== Reality ====
- Airline
- Beach Patrol
- Black Gold
- Bondi Ink Tattoo
- Cops
- Everest: Beyond the Limit
- Fear Factor
- Fight Master: Bellator MMA
- Firies
- Garage Gold
- GT Academy
- Hell's Kitchen
- Hunted
- Ice Road Truckers
- MasterChef Australia
- Operation Repo
- Scrappers
- Shark Tank
- Shred
- Thrill Seekers
- Undercover Boss
- Whacked Out Sports
- World Class Bartender of the Year
- World's Toughest Trucker

==== Sport ====
- Aussie Racing Cars
- Australian GT Championship
- Australian Rally Championship
- ANDRA Pro Series Drag Racing
- Aussie Millions Poker Championship
- Before the Game (except in VIC)
- The Back Page
- Bellator MMA
- Dunlop Super2 Series
- Esports Gfinity Elite Series Australia
- FIA Formula E Championship
- FIA World Rally Championship
- The Final Siren
- Football's Greatest Managers
- Football's Greatest Teams
- Football Stars of Tomorrow
- FIA Formula 1 World Championship (Highlight show)
- The Game Plan AFL
- The Game Plan NRL
- German Bundesliga
- Gillette World Sport
- Glory
- International Fishing Series
- Just for Kicks
- Monster Jam
- MotoGP
- MySurf.tv
- NASCAR: Highlights
- NASCAR Nationwide Series
- NASCAR Sprint Cup Series
- National Basketball League
- Netball: ANZ Championship
- Netball: Constellation Cup
- Netball: International Series
- Netball World Cup
- NHRA Camping World Drag Racing Series
- Omnisport
- One Week at a Time AFL
- One Week at a Time NRL
- The Open Championship
- Porsche Carrera Cup Highlights
- RPM
- The Road to Rio
- The Rugby Championship
- Race to the Sky
- Socceroos
- Sports Tonight
- Supercars: Highlights
- Super Rugby Extra Time
- SuperUtes Series
- Targa Tasmania
- Trans-Tasman Muscle Car Battle
- Thursday Night Live
- The Western Front
- Wild Racers
- Women's Big Bash League
- World Football News
- World Series Sprintcars
- World Skateboarding Championship
- World Sport

== Major Sponsors ==
- Harvey Norman
- Hungry Jack's
- Mars Bar
- Panasonic
- Sportsbet
- Toyota

=== Sport rights ===
In 2008, prior to the channel launching, Ten secured the rights for both the 2010 & 2014 editions of the Commonwealth Games, simulcasting on the channel. For the 2010 games in Delhi, it was also shared with Foxtel.

On 17 March 2009, the Australian Swimming Championships was broadcast on Ten HD before the launch of the channel on 26 March 2009 showing Live in 2009 until 2015, when the Seven Network secured a nine-year deal with Swimming Australia.

The channel had previously showed NASCAR, between 2010 and 2014 airing both Sprint Cup and Nationwide Series highlights. Every NASCAR Sprint Cup race was shown live between 2011 and 2014.

In October 2011, it was confirmed that the National Basketball League games would be delayed. During the 2012–13 season, some Friday night games were shown live on the channel at 9.30pm. Live Sunday games returned to 10 at 2pm.

By March 2012, sport was very much a secondary focus of 10 Bold. Sport is only shown when it clashes with 10's regular programming or as HD simulcast when it airs on 10. Moto GP races airs only on 10 Bold except for the Australian GP round which airs on 10 as well as 10 Drama as HD simulcast. F1 qualifying is shown on 10 Bold live while 10 replays later on.

The channel broadcast Formula One Grand Prix every qualifying session shown live with a half-hour preview, rights were held till 2015, including IPTV rights from 2011 to 2015 and from 2015 onwards Formula One showed a 1-hour highlight package at 9.30pm Mondays on One that aren't live on Network Ten while continuing with a simulcast on tenplay.

10 Drama broadcast Moto GP every race live (qualifying in highlights only from 2014 onwards) from 2010 till 2014, then from 2015 to 2016. Moto2 and Moto3 and MotoGP will be shown on the Australian Motorcycle Grand Prix round only on Ten.

In 2016, the channel showed highlights for every round of Super Rugby every Sunday morning and replays of every Wallabies Test at around midday, that was previously shown on TEN from The Rugby Championship and Spring Tour.

In May 2021, it was announced that Network 10 would have rights to the A-Leagues men's and women's competition, with all games being streamed on 10's paid streaming service Paramount+ and women's games to be shown for free on 10play. The 2024–25 and 2025–26 A-League Men season, broadcast two matches be shown live on 10 Drama every Saturday week.

In May 2026, Network 10 have renew rights to broadcast the A-Leagues men's and women's competition, with all games being streamed on 10's paid streaming service Paramount+ and women's games to be shown for free on VoD Service 10, also includes ten women’s matches shown live on 10 Drama each season, including the Grand Final. One A-League Men’s match per week will be broadcast live on Network 10, with marquee games broadcast on Network 10’s primary channel, 10.

== Availability ==
10 Drama is available in 1080i high definition from the network's five metropolitan owned-and-operated stations, TEN Sydney, ATV Melbourne, TVQ Brisbane, ADS Adelaide, and NEW Perth and it's regional owned and operated stations, GLV/BCV in Regional Victoria, CTC in Southern New South Wales/Australian Capital Territory, TNQ in Regional Queensland and NRN in Northern New South Wales.

It is also available in regional Australia in 576i standard definition from Seven Media Group's owned-and-operated stations, SGS/SCN in Spencer Gulf and Broken Hill. WIN Television through its owned-and-operated stations, MGS/LRS in eastern South Australia, and MDN in Griffith and the MIA. Digital joint-venture stations, TDT in Tasmania, WDT in regional Western Australia, DTD in Darwin, and CDT in Central Australia (including remote NT, QLD, NSW and SA) also broadcast 10 Drama but in 1080i high definition just like 10 Drama in 10's O&O stations.

Due to the relaunch of 10 HD on 2 March 2016, the channel was reduced to a standard-definition television channel in metropolitan areas for 5 years until 23 September 2021 at 6am when it switched back to a high-definition channel.

One was available to Foxtel cable subscribers via its HD+ package, and One SD was available on its basic cable service when it was broadcast.

== Logo and identity history ==
26 March 2009 – 7 May 2011

7 May 2011 – 31 October 2018

31 October 2018 – 4 November 2018

5 November – 10 December 2018

10 December 2018 – 12 June 2024

12 June 2024 – 30 June 2025

30 June 2025 – present

=== Identity history ===
- 26 March 2009 – 7 May 2011: Sharing One Passion Sport / Sport Lives Here
- 8 May 2011 – 31 October 2018: It All Lives Here
- 31 October 2018 – 12 June 2024: Heroes Live Here
- 12 June 2024 – present: Drama Lives Here

== See also ==
- List of digital television channels in Australia
