= The Western Front (TV series) =

- Genre: Sport
- Presented by: Tim Gossage (2002–2010); Lachy Reid (2002–2011)
- Country of origin: Australia
- Original language: English
- No. of seasons: 10

Production
- Production locations: Perth, Western Australia
- Running time: 30 minutes

Original release
- Network: Network Ten
- Release: 2002 – 8 October 2011

The Western Front was an Australian rules football television series that was broadcast on Network Ten in Western Australia in 2002 and ended on 8 October 2011.

The show focused on the two Western Australian teams in the Australian Football League, Fremantle and West Coast, as well as the West Australian Football League. The show was hosted by Tim Gossage and Lachy Reid from its debut until 2010, but for the 2011 season, Reid hosted it with a guest host each week.

The show was notable for encouraging people to form a "big 'W'" hand sign in the background of television broadcasts on any show on any network. The sign was created by holding your hands up in front of you with the thumbs touching and only the index fingers extended, to form a "W" shape. Each week the show highlighted signs seen at football matches, behind outside broadcasts or posed photos of people forming the W at notable locations around the world. They also encouraged celebrities to form the "W" sign, and filmed Kevin Rudd, John Howard, Jennifer Hawkins and Kobe Bryant.

The show was broadcast on Saturday afternoons, normally between the two midday and night games that Network Ten had the rights to broadcast, and prior to Before the Game, the nationally broadcast football comedy show.
