= The Game Plan (AFL) =

2011–2012 Australian TV series

- Genre: Sport
- Presented by: Wayne Carey; Scott Cummings; Mark Howard
- Country of origin: Australia
- Original language: English
- No. of seasons: 2
- No. of episodes: 40

Production
- Executive producer: David Barham
- Running time: 60 minutes (including commercials)

Original release
- Network: One
- Release: 23 March 2011 – 14 June 2012

Related
- Before the Game

The Game Plan is an Australian sports television program focused on the Australian Football League, it premiered on One on 23 March 2011. The final episode aired on 14 June 2012 with similar AFL-dedicated program Before the Game moving into its former timeslot following its cancellation.

== Hosts ==
- Wayne Carey
- Scott Cummings
- Mark Howard

== See also ==
- List of Australian television series
