= List of physicists =

Following is a list of physicists who are notable for their achievements.

== A ==
- Jules Aarons – United States (1921–2016)
- Ernst Karl Abbe – Germany (1840–1905)
- Derek Abbott – Australia (born 1960)
- Hasan Abdullayev – Azerbaijan Democratic Republic, Soviet Union, Azerbaijan (1918–1993)
- Alexei Alexeyevich Abrikosov – Soviet Union, Russia (1928–2017), Nobel laureate
- Robert Adler – United States (1913–2007)
- Stephen L. Adler – United States (born 1939)
- Franz Aepinus – Rostock (1724–1802)
- Mina Aganagic – Bosnia and Herzegovina, United States
- David Z Albert – United States (born 1954)
- Felicie Albert – France, United States
- Miguel Alcubierre – Mexico (born 1964)
- Zhores Ivanovich Alferov – Soviet Union, Russia (1930–2019), Nobel laureate
- Hannes Olof Gösta Alfvén – Sweden (1908–1995), Nobel laureate
- Alhazen – Basra, Iraq (965–1040)
- Artem Alikhanian – Soviet Union, Armenia (1908–1978)
- Abram Alikhanov – Soviet Union, Russia (1904–1970)
- John E. Allen – U.K. (born 1928)
- William Allis – United States (1901–1999)
- Samuel King Allison – United States (1900–1965)
- Yakov Lvovich Alpert – Soviet Union, Russia, United States (1911–2010)
- Ralph Asher Alpher – United States (1921–2007)
- Semen Altshuler – Soviet Union (1911–1983)
- Luis Walter Alvarez – United States (1911–1988), Nobel laureate
- Viktor Ambartsumian – Soviet Union, Armenia (1908–1996)
- André-Marie Ampère – France (1775–1836)
- Anja Cetti Andersen – Denmark (born 1965)
- Hans Henrik Andersen – Denmark (1937–2012)
- Carl David Anderson – United States (1905–1991), Nobel laureate
- Herbert L. Anderson – United States (1914–1988)
- Philip Warren Anderson – United States (1923–2020), Nobel laureate
- Elephter Andronikashvili – Soviet Union, Georgia (1910–1989)
- Anders Jonas Ångström – Sweden (1814–1874)
- Alexander Animalu – Nigeria (born 1938)
- Hideo Aoki - Japan (born 1950)
- Edward Victor Appleton – U.K. (1892–1965), Nobel laureate
- François Arago – France (1786–1853)
- Archimedes – Syracuse, Greece (ca. 287–212 BC)
- Manfred von Ardenne – Germany (1907–1997)
- Aristarchus of Samos – Samos, Greece (310–ca. 230 BC)
- Aristotle – Athens, Greece (384–322 BC)
- Nima Arkani-Hamed – United States (born 1972)
- Lev Artsimovich – Soviet Union (1909–1973)
- Aryabhata – Pataliputra, India (476–550)
- Neil Ashby – United States (born 1934)
- Maha Ashour-Abdalla – Egypt, United States (1943–2016)
- Gurgen Askaryan – Soviet Union (1928–1997)
- Alain Aspect – France (born 1947)
- Marcel Audiffren – France
- Pierre Victor Auger – France (1899–1993)
- Avicenna – Persia (980–1037)
- Amedeo Avogadro – Italy (1776–1856)
- David Awschalom – United States (born 1956)

== B ==
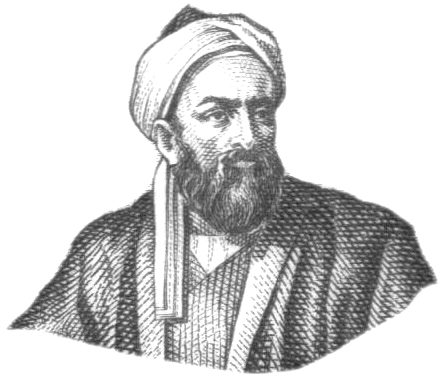
Biruni is one of the best-known early physicists

- Tom Baehr-Jones – United States (born 1980)
- John Norris Bahcall – United States (1934–2005)
- Gilbert Ronald Bainbridge – U.K. (1925–2003)
- Cornelis Bakker – Netherlands (1904–1960)
- Aiyalam Parameswaran Balachandran – India (born 1938)
- V Balakrishnan – India (born 1943)
- Milla Baldo-Ceolin – Italy (1924–2011)
- Johann Jakob Balmer – Switzerland (1825–1898)
- Tom Banks – United States (born 1949)
- Xiaoyi Bao – Canada
- Riccardo Barbieri – Italy (born 1944)
- Marcia Barbosa – Brazil (born 1960)
- John Bardeen – United States (1908–1991), double Nobel laureate
- William A. Bardeen – United States (born 1941)
- Ronald Hugh Barker – Ireland (1915–2015)
- Charles Glover Barkla – U.K. (1877–1944), Nobel laureate
- Amanda Barnard – Australia (born 1971)
- Boyd Bartlett – United States (1897–1965)
- Asım Orhan Barut – Malatya, Turkey (1926–1994)
- Heinz Barwich – Germany (1911–1966)
- Nikolay Basov – Soviet Union, Russia (1922–2001), Nobel laureate
- Laura Maria Caterina Bassi – Italy (1711–1778)
- Zoltán Lajos Bay – Hungary (1900–1992)
- Karl Bechert – Germany (1901–1981)
- Henri Becquerel – France (1852–1908), Nobel laureate
- Johannes Georg Bednorz – Germany (born 1950), Nobel laureate
- Isaac Beeckman – Netherlands (1588–1637)
- Jacob Bekenstein – Israel (1947–2015)
- Alexander Graham Bell – Scotland, Canada, United States (1847–1922)
- John Stewart Bell – U.K. (1928–1990)
- Jocelyn Bell Burnell – Northern Ireland, U.K. (born 1943)
- Carl M. Bender – United States (born 1943)
- Abraham Bennet – England (1749–1799)
- Daniel Bernoulli – Switzerland (1700–1782)
- Hans Bethe – Germany, United States (1906–2005), Nobel laureate
- Homi J. Bhabha – India (1909–1966)
- Mani Lal Bhaumik – United States (born 1931)
- Lars Bildsten – United States (1964)
- James Binney – England (born 1950)
- Gerd Binnig – Germany (born 1947), Nobel laureate
- Jean-Baptiste Biot – France (1774–1862)
- Raymond T. Birge – United States (1887–1980)
- Abū Rayhān al-Bīrūnī – Persia (973–1048)
- Vilhelm Bjerknes – Norway (1862–1951)
- James Bjorken – United States (1934–2024)
- Joseph Black – Scotland, U.K. (1728–1799)
- Patrick Blackett – U.K. (1897–1974), Nobel laureate
- Felix Bloch – Switzerland (1905–1983), Nobel laureate
- Nicolaas Bloembergen – Netherlands, United States (1920–2017), Nobel laureate
- Walter Boas – Germany, Australia (1904–1982)
- Céline Bœhm – France (born 1974)
- Nikolay Bogolyubov – Soviet Union, Russia (1909–1992)
- David Bohm – United States (1917–1992)
- Aage Bohr – Denmark (1922–2009), Nobel laureate
- Niels Bohr – Denmark (1885–1962), Nobel laureate
- Martin Bojowald – Germany (born 1973)
- Ludwig Boltzmann – Austria (1844–1906)
- Eugene T. Booth – United States (1912–2004)
- Max Born – Germany, U.K. (1882–1970), Nobel laureate
- Rudjer Josip Boscovich – Croatia (1711–1787)
- Jagadish Chandra Bose – India (1858–1937)
- Margrete Heiberg Bose – Denmark (1866–1952)
- Satyendra Nath Bose – India (1894–1974)
- Johannes Bosscha – Netherlands (1831–1911)
- Walther Bothe – Germany (1891–1957), Nobel laureate
- Edward Bouchet – United States (1852–1918)
- Mustapha Ishak Boushaki – Algeria (1967–)
- Mark Bowick – United States (born 1957)
- Robert Boyle – Ireland, England (1627–1691)
- Willard S. Boyle – Canada, United States (1924–2011), Nobel laureate
- William Henry Bragg – U.K. (1862–1942), Nobel laureate
- William Lawrence Bragg – U.K., Australia (1890–1971), Nobel laureate
- Tycho Brahe – Denmark (1546–1601)
- Howard Brandt – United States (1939–2014)
- Walter Houser Brattain – United States (1902–1987), Nobel laureate
- Karl Ferdinand Braun – Germany (1850–1918), Nobel laureate
- David Brewster – U.K. (1781–1868)
- Percy Williams Bridgman – United States (1882–1961), Nobel laureate
- Léon Nicolas Brillouin – France (1889–1969)
- Marcel Brillouin – France (1854–1948)
- Bertram Brockhouse – Canada (1918–2003), Nobel laureate
- Louis-Victor de Broglie – France (1892–1987), Nobel laureate
- William Fuller Brown, Jr. – United States (1904–1983)
- Ernst Brüche – Germany (1900–1985)
- Hermann Brück – Germany (1905–2000)
- Ari Brynjolfsson – Iceland (1927–2013)
- Hans Buchdahl – Germany, Australia (1918–2010)
- Gersh Budker – Soviet Union (1918–1977)
- Silke Bühler-Paschen – Austria (born 1967)
- Yury Bunkov – Soviet Union, Russia (1950–2026)
- Johannes Martinus Burgers – Netherlands (1895–1981)
- Friedrich Burmeister – Germany (1890–1969)
- Bimla Buti – India (1933–2024)
- Christophorus Buys Ballot – Netherlands (1817–1890)

== C ==
- Nicola Cabibbo – Italy (1935–2010)
- Nicolás Cabrera – Spain (1913–1989)
- Curtis Callan – United States (born 1942)
- Annie Jump Cannon – United States (1863–1941)
- Fritjof Capra – Austria, United States (born 1939)
- Marcela Carena – Argentina (born 1962)
- Ricardo Carezani – Argentina, United States (1921–2016)
- Nicolas Léonard Sadi Carnot – France (1796–1832)
- David Carroll – United States (born 1963)
- Brandon Carter – Australia (born 1942)
- Hendrik Casimir – Netherlands (1909–2000)
- Henry Cavendish – U.K. (1731–1810)
- James Chadwick – U.K. (1891–1974), Nobel laureate
- Owen Chamberlain – United States (1920–2006), Nobel laureate
- Moses H. W. Chan – Hong Kong (born 1946)
- Subrahmanyan Chandrasekhar – India, United States (1910–1995), Nobel laureate
- Tsao Chang – China (born 1942)
- Georges Charpak – France (1924–2010), Nobel laureate
- Émilie du Châtelet – France (1706–1749)
- Swapan Chattopadhyay – India (born 1951)
- Pavel Alekseyevich Cherenkov – Imperial Russia, Soviet Union (1904–1990), Nobel laureate
- Maxim Chernodub – Soviet Union, Russia, France (born 1973)
- Geoffrey Chew – United States (1924–2019)
- Boris Chirikov – Soviet Union, Russia (1928–2008)
- Juansher Chkareuli – Soviet Union, Georgia (born 1940)
- Ernst Chladni – Germany (1756–1827)
- Nicholas Christofilos – Greece (1916–1972)
- Steven Chu – United States (born 1948), Nobel laureate
- Giovanni Ciccotti – Italy (born 1943)
- Orion Ciftja – United States
- Benoît Clapeyron – France (1799–1864)
- George W. Clark – United States
- John Clauser – United States (born 1942), Nobel laureate
- Rudolf Clausius – Germany (1822–1888)
- Richard Clegg – U.K.
- Gari Clifford – British-American physicist, biomedical engineer, academic, researcher
- John Cockcroft – U.K. (1897–1967), Nobel laureate
- Claude Cohen-Tannoudji – France (1933–2026), Nobel laureate
- Arthur Compton – United States (1892–1962), Nobel laureate
- Karl Compton – United States (1887–1954)
- Edward Condon – United States (1902–1974)
- Leon Cooper – United States (1930–2024), Nobel laureate
- Nicolaus Copernicus – Poland (1473–1543)
- Alejandro Corichi – Mexico (born 1967)
- Gaspard-Gustave Coriolis – France (1792–1843)
- Allan McLeod Cormack – South Africa, United States (1924–1998)
- Eric Allin Cornell – United States (born 1961), Nobel laureate
- Marie Alfred Cornu – France (1841–1902)
- Charles-Augustin de Coulomb – France (1736–1806)
- Ernest Courant – United States (1920–2020)
- Brian Cox – U.K. (born 1968)
- Thomas E. Cravens – United States, cometary x-rays
- Charles Critchfield – United States (1910–1994)
- James Cronin – United States (1931–2016), Nobel laureate
- Sir William Crookes – U.K. (1832–1919)
- Paul Crowell – United States
- Marie Curie – Russian Empire, France (1867–1934), twice Nobel laureate
- Pierre Curie – France (1859–1906), Nobel laureate
- Predrag Cvitanović – Croatia (born 1946)

== D ==
- Jean le Rond d'Alembert – France (1717–1783)
- Gustaf Dalén – Sweden (1869–1937), Nobel laureate
- Jean Dalibard – France (born 1958)
- Richard Dalitz – U.K., United States (1925–2006)
- John Dalton – U.K. (1766–1844)
- Sanja Damjanović – Yugoslavia, Montenegro (born 1972)
- Ranjan Roy Daniel – India (1923–2005)
- Charles Galton Darwin – U.K. (1887–1962)
- Ashok Das – India, United States (born 1953)
- James C. Davenport – United States (born 1938)
- Paul Davies – Australia (born 1946)
- Raymond Davis, Jr. – United States (1914–2006), Nobel laureate
- Clinton Davisson – United States (1881–1958), Nobel laureate
- Peter Debije – Netherlands (1884–1966)
- Hans Georg Dehmelt – Germany, United States (1922–2017), Nobel laureate
- Max Delbrück – Germany, United States (1906–1981)
- Democritus – Abdera (ca. 460–360 BC)
- Arthur Jeffrey Dempster – Canada (1886–1950)
- David M. Dennison – United States (1900–1976)
- Beryl May Dent – U.K. (1900–1977)
- René Descartes – France (1596–1650)
- David Deutsch – Israel, U.K. (born 1953)
- James Dewar – U.K. (1842–1923)
- Scott Diddams – United States
- Ulrike Diebold – Austria (born 1961)
- Robbert Dijkgraaf – Netherlands (born 1960)
- Viktor Dilman – Soviet Union, Russia (born 1926)
- Savas Dimopoulos – United States (born 1952)
- Paul Dirac – Switzerland, U.K. (1902–1984), Nobel laureate
- Revaz Dogonadze – Soviet Union, Georgia (1931–1985)
- Louise Dolan – United States (born 1950)
- Amos Dolbear – United States (1837–1910)
- Robert Döpel – Germany (1895–1982)
- Christian Doppler – Austria (1803–1853)
- Henk Dorgelo – Netherlands (1894–1961)
- Friedrich Ernst Dorn – Germany (1848–1916)
- Geneva Smith Douglas – United States (1932–1993)
- Michael R. Douglas – United States (born 1961)
- Jonathan Dowling – United States (1955–2020)
- Claudia Draxl – Germany (born 1959)
- Sidney Drell – United States (1926–2016)
- Mildred Dresselhaus – United States (1930–2017)
- Paul Drude – Germany (1863–1906)
- Émilie du Châtelet – France (1706–1749)
- F. J. Duarte – United States (born 1954)
- Pierre Louis Dulong – France (1785–1838)
- Janette Dunlop – Scotland (1891–1971)
- Samuel T. Durrance – United States (born 1943)
- Freeman Dyson – U.K., United States (1923–2020), Wolf laureate

== E ==
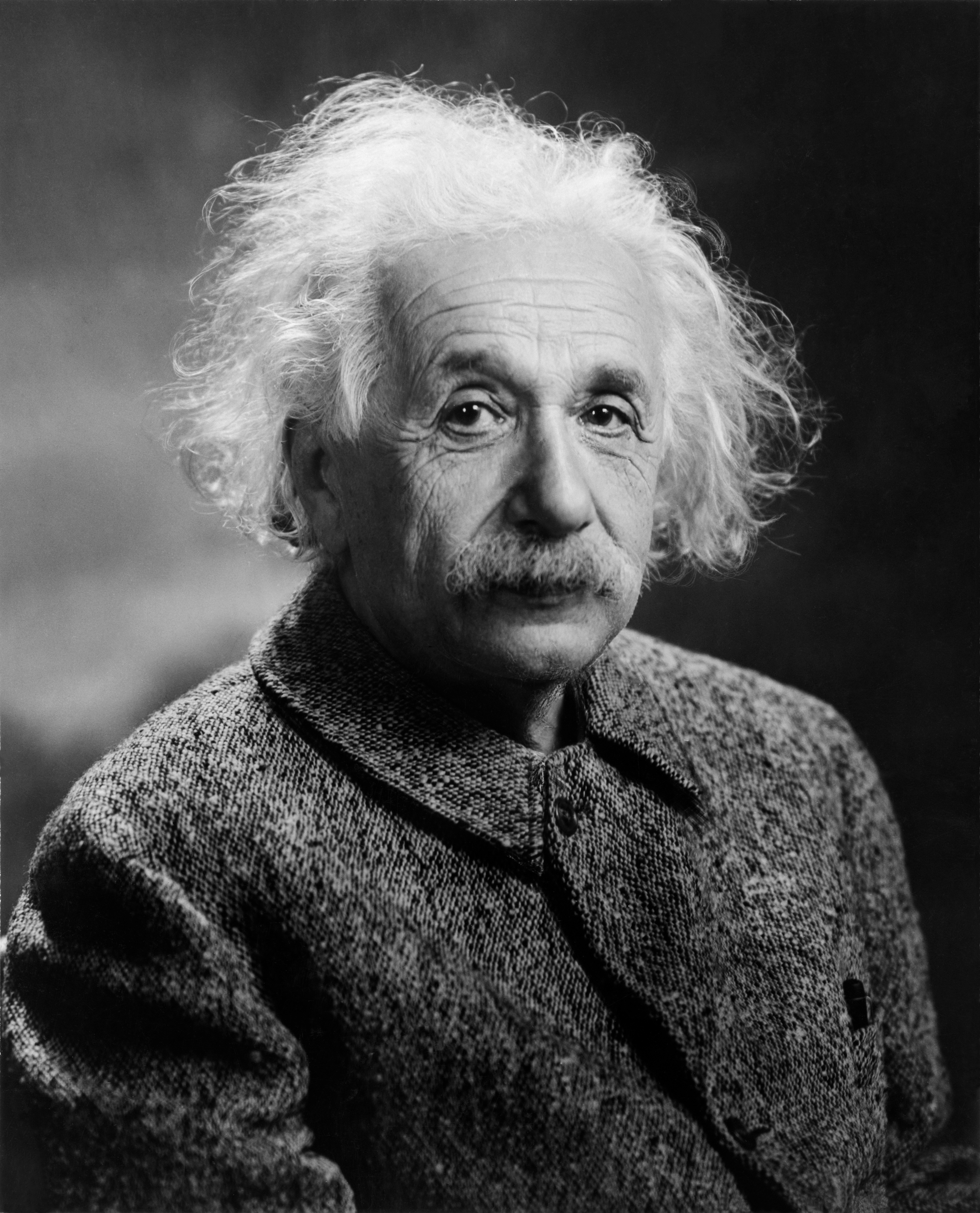
Albert Einstein in 1947

- Joseph H. Eberly – United States (1935–2025)
- William Eccles – U.K. (1875–1966)
- Carl Eckart – United States (1902–1973)
- Arthur Stanley Eddington – U.K. (1882–1944)
- Thomas Edison – United States, invented the lightbulb
- Paul Ehrenfest – Austria-Hungary, Netherlands (1880–1933)
- Felix Ehrenhaft – Austria-Hungary, United States (1879–1952)
- Manfred Eigen – Germany (1927–2019)
- Albert Einstein – Germany, Italy, Switzerland, United States (1879–1955), Nobel laureate
- Laura Eisenstein (1942–1985), professor of physics at University of Illinois
- Terence James Elkins – Australia, United States (1936–2023)
- John Ellis – U.K. (born 1946)
- Paul John Ellis – U.K., United States (1941–2005)
- Richard Keith Ellis – U.K., United States (born 1949)
- Arpad Elo – Hungary (1903–1992)
- François Englert – Belgium (1932–2026), Nobel laureate
- David Enskog – Sweden (1884–1947)
- Loránd Eötvös – Austria-Hungary (1848–1919)
- Leo Esaki – Japan (born 1925), Nobel laureate
- Ernest Esclangon – France (1876–1954)
- Louis Essen – U.K. (1908–1997)
- Leonhard Euler – Switzerland (1707–1783)
- Denis Evans – Australia (born 1951)
- Paul Peter Ewald – Germany, United States (1888–1985)
- James Alfred Ewing – U.K. (1855–1935)
- Franz S. Exner – Austria (1849–1926)

== F ==
- Ludvig Faddeev – Soviet Union, Russia (1934–2017)
- Daniel Gabriel Fahrenheit – Prussia (1686–1736)
- Kazimierz Fajans – Russian Empire, Poland, United States (1887–1975)
- James E. Faller – United States
- Michael Faraday – U.K. (1791–1867)
- Eugene Feenberg – United States (1906–1977)
- Mitchell Feigenbaum – United States (1944–2019)
- Gerald Feinberg – United States (1933–1992)
- Enrico Fermi – Italy (1901–1954), Nobel laureate
- Albert Fert – France (born 1938), Nobel laureate
- Herman Feshbach – United States (1917–2000)
- Richard Feynman – United States (1918–1988), Nobel laureate
- Wolfgang Finkelnburg – Germany (1905–1967)
- David Finkelstein – United States (1929–2016)
- Johannes Fischer – Germany (born 1887)
- Willy Fischler – Belgium (born 1949)
- Val Logsdon Fitch – United States (1923–2015), Nobel laureate
- George Francis FitzGerald – Ireland (1851–1901)
- Hippolyte Fizeau – France (1819–1896)
- Georgy Flyorov – Russian Empire, Soviet Union (1913–1990)
- Vladimir Fock – Russian Empire, Soviet Union (1898–1974)
- Adriaan Fokker – Netherlands (1887–1972)
- Arthur Foley – America (1867–1945)
- James David Forbes – U.K. (1809–1868)
- Jeff Forshaw – U.K. (born 1968)
- Léon Foucault – France (1819–1868)
- Joseph Fourier – France (1768–1830)
- Ralph H. Fowler – U.K. (1889–1944)
- William Alfred Fowler – United States (1911–1995), Nobel laureate
- James Franck – Germany, United States (1882–1964), Nobel laureate
- Ilya Frank – Russian Empire, Soviet Union (1908–1990), Nobel laureate
- Benjamin Franklin – British America, United States (1706–1790)
- Rosalind Franklin – U.K. (1920–1958)
- Walter Franz – Germany (1911–1992)
- Joseph von Fraunhofer – Germany (1787–1826)
- Steven Frautschi – United States (born 1933)
- Joan Maie Freeman – Australia (1918–1998)
- Phyllis S. Freier – United States (1921–1992))
- Yakov Frenkel – Russian Empire, Soviet Union (1894–1952)
- Augustin-Jean Fresnel – France (1788–1827)
- Peter Freund – United States (1936–2018)
- Daniel Friedan – United States (born 1948)
- B. Roy Frieden – United States (born 1936)
- Alexander Friedman – Russian Empire, Soviet Union (1888–1925)
- Jerome Isaac Friedman – United States (born 1930), Nobel laureate
- Otto Frisch – Austria, U.K. (1904–1979)
- Harald Fuchs – Germany (born 1951)
- Erwin Fues – Germany (1893–1970)

== G ==
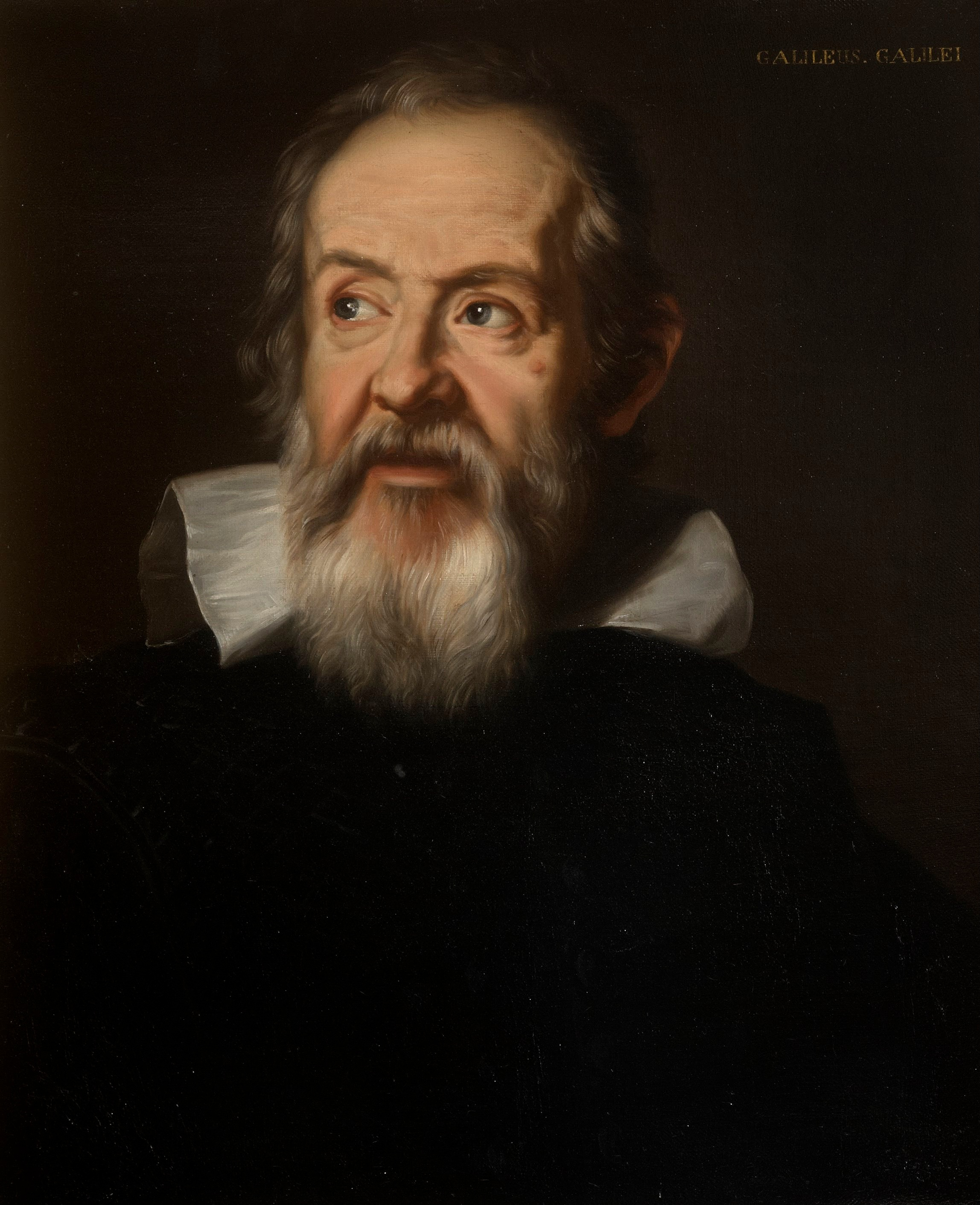
Galileo Galilei, the founder of Modern Science and Physics

- Dennis Gabor – Hungary (1900–1979), Nobel laureate
- Mary K. Gaillard – France, United States (1939–2025)
- Galileo Galilei – Italy (1564–1642)
- Luigi Galvani – Italy (1737–1798)
- George Gamow – Russian Empire, Soviet Union, United States (1904–1968)
- Domenica Garzón – Ecuador (living)
- Sylvester James Gates – United States (born 1950)
- Carl Friedrich Gauss – Germany (1777–1855)
- Pamela L. Gay – United States (born 1973)
- Joseph Louis Gay-Lussac – France (1778–1850)
- Hans Geiger – Germany (1882–1945)
- Andre Geim – Soviet Union, Russia, Netherlands, U.K. (born 1958), Nobel laureate
- Murray Gell-Mann – United States (1929–2019), Nobel laureate
- Pierre-Gilles de Gennes – France (1932–2007), Nobel laureate
- Howard Georgi – United States (born 1947)
- Walter Gerlach – Germany (1889–1979)
- Christian Gerthsen – Denmark, Germany (1894–1956)
- Ezra Getzler – Australia (born 1962)
- Andrea M. Ghez – United States (born 1955), Nobel laureate
- Riccardo Giacconi – Italy, United States (1931–2018), Nobel laureate
- Ivar Giaever – Norway, United States (1929–2025), Nobel laureate
- Josiah Willard Gibbs – United States (1839–1903)
- Valerie Gibson – U.K. (born 19??)
- William Gilbert – England (1544–1603)
- Piara Singh Gill – India (1911–2002)
- Naomi Ginsberg – United States (born 1979)
- Vitaly Lazarevich Ginzburg – Soviet Union, Russia (1916–2009), Nobel laureate
- Marvin D. Girardeau – United States (1930–2015)
- Marissa Giustina – United States (born 19??)
- Donald Arthur Glaser – United States (1926–2013), Nobel laureate
- Sheldon Glashow – United States (born 1932), Nobel laureate
- G. N. Glasoe – United States (1902–1987)
- Roy Jay Glauber – United States (1925–2018), Nobel laureate
- James Glimm – United States (born 1934)
- Karl Glitscher – Germany (1886–1945)
- Peter Goddard – U.K. (born 1945)
- Maria Goeppert-Mayer – Germany, United States (1906–1972), Nobel laureate
- Gerald Goertzel – United States (1920–2002)
- Marvin Leonard Goldberger – United States (1922–2014)
- Maurice Goldhaber – Austria, United States (1911–2011)
- Jeffrey Goldstone – U.K., United States (1933–2026)
- Ravi Gomatam – India (born 1950)
- Mar Gómez – Spain (1985)
- Sixto González – Puerto Rico, United States (born 1965)
- Deryck Goodwin – U.K. (1927–1997)
- Lev Gor'kov – United States (1929–2016)
- Samuel Goudsmit – Netherlands, United States (1902–1978)
- Leo Graetz – Germany (1856–1941)
- Willem 's Gravesande – Netherlands (1688–1742)
- Michael Green – Britain (born 1946)
- Daniel Greenberger – United States (born 1932)
- Brian Greene – United States (born 1963)
- John Gribbin – U.K. (born 1946)
- Vladimir Gribov – Soviet Union, Russia (1930–1997)
- David J. Griffiths – United States (born 1942)
- David Gross – United States (born 1941), Nobel laureate
- Frederick Grover – United States (1876–1973)
- Peter Grünberg – Germany (1939–2018), Nobel laureate
- Charles Édouard Guillaume – Switzerland (1861–1931), Nobel laureate
- Ayyub Guliyev – Soviet Union, Azerbaijan (born 1954)
- Feza Gürsey – Turkey (1921–1992)
- Hanoch Gutfreund – Israel (born 1935)
- Alan Guth – United States (born 1947)
- Martin Gutzwiller – Switzerland (1925–2014)

== H ==
- Rudolf Haag – Germany (1922–2016)
- Wander Johannes de Haas – Netherlands (1878–1960)
- Alain Haché – Canada (born 1970)
- Carl Richard Hagen – United States (born 1937)
- Otto Hahn – Germany (1879–1968)
- Edwin Hall – United States (1855–1938)
- John Lewis Hall – United States (born 1934), Nobel laureate
- Alexander Hamilton – U.K., Australia (born 1967)
- William Rowan Hamilton – Ireland (1805–1865)
- Theodor Wolfgang Hänsch – Germany (born 1941), Nobel laureate
- Peter Andreas Hansen – Denmark (1795–1874)
- W.W. Hansen – United States (1909–1949)
- Serge Haroche – France (born 1944), Nobel laureate
- Paul Harteck – Germany (1902–1985)
- John G. Hartnett – Australia (born 1952)
- Douglas Hartree – U.K. (1897–1958)
- Friedrich Hasenöhrl – Austria, Hungary (1874–1915)
- Lene Vestergaard Hau – Vejle, Denmark (born 1959)
- Stephen Hawking – U.K. (1942–2018), Wolf laureate
- Ibn al-Haytham – Iraq (965–1039)
- Evans Hayward – United States (1922–2020)
- Oliver Heaviside – U.K. (1850–1925)
- Werner Heisenberg – Germany (1901–1976), Nobel laureate
- Walter Heitler – Germany, Ireland (1904–1981)
- Hermann von Helmholtz – Germany (1821–1894)
- Charles H. Henry – United States (1937–2016)
- Joseph Henry – United States (1797–1878)
- John Herapath – U.K. (1790–1868)
- Carl Hermann – Germany (1898–1961)
- Gustav Ludwig Hertz – Germany (1887–1975), Nobel laureate
- Heinrich Rudolf Hertz – Germany (1857–1894)
- Karl Herzfeld – Austria, United States (1892–1978)
- Victor Francis Hess – Austria, United States (1883–1964), Nobel laureate
- Mahmoud Hessaby – Iran (1903–1992)
- Antony Hewish – U.K. (1924–2021), Nobel laureate
- Paul G. Hewitt – United States (born 1931)
- Peter Higgs – U.K. (1929–2024), Nobel laureate
- George William Hill – United States (1838–1914)
- Gustave-Adolphe Hirn – France (1815–1890)
- Carol Hirschmugl – United States, professor of physics, laboratory director
- Dorothy Crowfoot Hodgkin – England (1910–1994)
- Robert Hofstadter – United States (1915–1990), Nobel laureate
- Helmut Hönl – Germany (1903–1981)
- Pervez Hoodbhoy – Pakistan (born 1950)
- Gerardus 't Hooft – Netherlands (born 1946), Nobel laureate
- Robert Hooke – England (1635–1703)
- John Hopkinson – U.K. (1849–1898)
- Johann Baptiste Horvath – Slovakia (1732–1799)
- William V. Houston – United States (1900–1968)
- Charlotte (née Riefenstahl) Houtermans – Germany (1899–1993)
- Fritz Houtermans – Netherlands, Germany, Austria (1903–1966)
- Archibald Howie – U.K. (born 1934)
- Fred Hoyle – U.K. (1915–2001)
- Veronika Hubeny – United States
- John Hubbard – U.K. (1931–1980)
- John H. Hubbell – United States (1925–2007)
- Edwin Powell Hubble – United States (1889–1953)
- Russell Alan Hulse – United States (born 1950), Nobel laureate
- Friedrich Hund – Germany (1896–1997)
- Tahir Hussain – Pakistan (1923–2010)
- Christiaan Huygens – Netherlands (1629–1695)

== I ==
- Arthur Iberall – United States (1918–2002)
- Sumio Iijima – Japan (born 1939)
- John Iliopoulos – Greece (born 1940)
- Ataç İmamoğlu – Turkey, United States (born 1962)
- Elmer Imes – United States (1883–1941)
- Abram Ioffe – Russian Empire, Soviet Union (1880–1960)
- Nathan Isgur – United States, Canada (1947–2001)
- Ernst Ising – Germany (1900–1998)
- Jamal Nazrul Islam – Bangladesh (1939–2013)
- Werner Israel – Canada (1931–2022)

== J ==
- Roman Jackiw – Poland, United States (1939–2023)
- Shirley Ann Jackson – United States (born 1946)
- Boris Jacobi – Germany, Russia (1801–1874)
- Gregory Jaczko – United States (born 1970)
- Chennupati Jagadish – India, Australia (born 1957)
- Jainendra Jain – India (born 1960)
- Antal István Jákli – Hungary (born 1958)
- Ratko Janev – North Macedonia (1939–2019)
- Andreas Jaszlinszky – Hungary (1715–1783)
- Ali Javan – Iran (1928–2016)
- Edwin Jaynes – United States (1922–1998)
- Sir James Jeans – U.K. (1877–1946)
- Johannes Hans Daniel Jensen – Germany (1907–1973), Nobel laureate
- Deborah S. Jin – United States (born 1968)
- Anthony M. Johnson – United States (born 1954)
- Irène Joliot-Curie – France (1897–1956)
- Lorella Jones – United States (1943–1995)
- Pascual Jordan – Germany (1902–1980)
- Vania Jordanova – United States, physicist, space weather and geomagnetic storms
- Brian David Josephson – U.K. (born 1940), Nobel laureate
- James Prescott Joule – U.K. (1818–1889)
- Adolfas Jucys – Russian Empire, Lithuania, Soviet Union (1904–1974)
- Chang Kee Jung – South Korea, United States

== K ==
- Menas Kafatos – Greece, United States (born 1945)
- Takaaki Kajita – Japan (born 1959), Nobel laureate
- Michio Kaku – United States (born 1947)
- APJ Abdul Kalam – India
- Theodor Kaluza – Germany (1885–1954)
- Heike Kamerlingh Onnes – Netherlands (1853–1926), Nobel laureate
- William R. Kanne – United States
- Charles K. Kao – China, Hong Kong, U.K., United States (1933–2018), Nobel laureate
- Pyotr Kapitsa – Russian Empire, Soviet Union (1894–1984), Nobel laureate
- Theodore von Kármán – Hungary, United States (1881–1963), aeronautical engineer
- Alfred Kastler – France (1902–1984), Nobel laureate
- Amrom Harry Katz – United States (1915–1997)
- Moshe Kaveh – Israel (born 1943), president of Bar-Ilan University
- Predhiman Krishan Kaw – India (1948–2017)
- Heinrich Kayser – Germany (1853–1940)
- Willem Hendrik Keesom – Netherlands (1876–1956)
- Edwin C. Kemble – United States (1889–1984)
- Henry Way Kendall – United States (1926–1999), Nobel laureate
- Johannes Kepler – Germany (1571–1630)
- John Kerr – Scotland (1824–1907)
- Wolfgang Ketterle – Germany (born 1957), Nobel laureate
- Isaak Markovich Khalatnikov – Soviet Union, Russia (1919–2021)
- Jim Al-Khalili – U.K. (born 1962)
- Abdul Qadeer Khan – Pakistan (1936–2021)
- Yulii Borisovich Khariton – Russian Empire, Soviet Union, Russia (1904–1996)
- Erhard Kietz – Germany, United States (1909–1982)
- Jack Kilby – United States (1923–2005), electronics engineer, Nobel laureate
- Toichiro Kinoshita – Japan, United States (1925–2023)
- Gustav Kirchhoff – Germany (1824–1887)
- Oskar Klein – Sweden (1894–1977)
- Hagen Kleinert – Germany (born 1941)
- Klaus von Klitzing – Germany (born 1943), Nobel laureate
- Jens Martin Knudsen – Denmark (1930–2005)
- Martin Knudsen – Denmark (1871–1949)
- Makoto Kobayashi – Japan (born 1944), Nobel laureate
- Adéla Kochanovská – Czech (1907–1985), first woman professor
- Arthur Korn – Germany (1870–1945)
- Masatoshi Koshiba – Japan (1926–2020), Nobel laureate
- Matthew Koss – United States (born 1961)
- Walther Kossel – Germany (1888–1956)
- Ashutosh Kotwal – United States (born 1965)
- Lew Kowarski – France (1907–1979)
- Hendrik Kramers – Netherlands (1894–1952)
- Sabine Kraml – Austria (born 1971)
- Serguei Krasnikov – Soviet Union, Russia (born 1961)
- Adolf Kratzer – Germany (1893–1983)
- Lawrence M. Krauss – United States (born 1954)
- Herbert Kroemer – Germany (1928–2024), Nobel laureate
- August Krönig – Germany (1822–1879)
- Ralph Kronig – Germany, United States (1904–1995)
- Nikolay Sergeevich Krylov – Soviet Union (1917–1947)
- Ryogo Kubo – Japan (1920–1995)
- Daya Shankar Kulshreshtha – India (born 1951)
- Shaiwatna Kupratakul – Thailand (born 1940)
- Igor Vasilyevich Kurchatov – Russian Empire, Soviet Union (1903–1960)
- Behram Kursunoglu – Turkey (1922–2003)
- Polykarp Kusch – Germany (1911–1993), Nobel laureate

== L ==
- James W. LaBelle – United States
- TH Laby – Australia (1880–1946)
- Joseph-Louis Lagrange – France (1736–1813)
- Willis Lamb – United States (1913–2008), Nobel laureate
- Lev Davidovich Landau – Russian Empire, Soviet Union (1908–1968), Nobel laureate
- Rolf Landauer – United States (1927–1999)
- Grigory Landsberg – Russian Empire, Soviet Union (1890–1957)
- Kenneth Lane – United States
- Paul Langevin – France (1872–1946)
- Irving Langmuir – United States (1881–1957)
- Pierre-Simon Laplace – France (1749–1827)
- Joseph Larmor – U.K. (1857–1942)
- John Latham – U.K. (1937–2021)
- Cesar Lattes – Brazil (1924–2005)
- Max von Laue – Germany (1879–1960), Nobel laureate
- Robert Betts Laughlin – United States (born 1950), Nobel laureate
- Mikhail Lavrentyev – Russian Empire, Soviet Union (1900–1980)
- Ernest Lawrence – United States (1901–1958), Nobel laureate
- Melvin Lax – United States (1922–2002)
- Pyotr Nikolaevich Lebedev – Russian Empire (1866–1912)
- Lindsay LeBlanc – Canada (living)
- Leon Max Lederman – United States (1922–2018), Nobel laureate
- Benjamin Lee – Korea, United States (1935–1977)
- David Lee – United States (born 1931), Nobel laureate
- Tsung-Dao Lee – China, United States (1926–2024), Nobel laureate
- Anthony James Leggett – U.K., United States (born 1938), Nobel laureate
- Gottfried Wilhelm Leibniz – Germany (1646–1716)
- Robert B. Leighton – United States (1919–1997)
- Georges Lemaître – Belgium (1894–1966)
- Philipp Lenard – Hungary, Germany (1862–1947), Nobel laureate
- John Lennard-Jones – U.K. (1894–1954)
- John Leslie – U.K. (1766–1832)
- Walter Lewin – Netherlands, United States (born 1936)
- Martin Lewis Perl – United States (1927–2014)
- Anne L'Huillier – France, Sweden (born 1958), Nobel laureate
- Robert von Lieben – Austria-Hungary (1878–1913)
- Alfred-Marie Liénard – France (1869–1958)
- Evgeny Lifshitz – Russian Empire, Soviet Union (1915–1985)
- David Lindley – United States (born 1956)
- John Linsley – United States (1925–2002)
- Chris Lintott – U.K. (born 1980)
- Gabriel Jonas Lippmann – France, Luxemburg (1845–1921), Nobel laureate
- Antony Garrett Lisi – United States (born 1968)
- Karl L. Littrow – Austria (1811–1877)
- Seth Lloyd – United States (born 1960)
- Oliver Lodge – U.K. (1851–1940)
- Maurice Loewy – Austria, France (1833–1907)
- Robert K. Logan – United States (born 1939)
- Mikhail Lomonosov – Tsardom of Russia, Russian Empire (1711–1765)
- Alfred Lee Loomis – United States (1887–1975)
- Ramón E. López – United States (born 1959)
- Hendrik Lorentz – Netherlands (1853–1928), Nobel laureate
- Ludvig Lorenz – Denmark (1829–1891)
- Johann Josef Loschmidt – Austria (1821–1895)
- Oleg Losev – Russian Empire, Soviet Union (1903–1942)
- Archibald Low – U.K. (1888–1956)
- Per-Olov Löwdin – Sweden (1916–2000)
- Lucretius – Rome (98?–55 BC)
- Aleksandr Mikhailovich Lyapunov – Russian Empire (1857–1918)
- Joseph Lykken – United States (born 1957)

== M ==
- Carolina Henriette MacGillavry – Netherlands (1904–1993)
- Ernst Mach – Austria-Hungary (1838–1916)
- Katie Mack – United States (born 1981)
- Gladys Mackenzie – Scotland (1903–1972)
- Ray Mackintosh – U.K.
- Luciano Maiani – Italy, San Marino (born 1941)
- Theodore Maiman – United States (1927–2007)
- Arthur Maitland – U.K. (1925–1994)
- Ettore Majorana – Italy (1906–1938 presumed dead)
- Sudhansu Datta Majumdar – India (1915–1997)
- Richard Makinson – Australia (1913–1979)
- Juan Martín Maldacena – Argentina (born 1968)
- Étienne-Louis Malus – France (1775–1812)
- Leonid Isaakovich Mandelshtam – Russian Empire, Soviet Union (1879–1944)
- Franz Mandl – U.K. (1923–2009)
- Robert Mann – Canada
- Charles Lambert Manneback – Belgium (1894–1975)
- Peter Mansfield – U.K. (1933–2017)
- Carlo Marangoni – Italy (1840–1925)
- M. Cristina Marchetti – Italy, United States (born 1955)
- Guglielmo Marconi – Italy (1874–1937), Nobel laureate
- Henry Margenau – Germany, United States (1901–1977)
- Nina Marković – Yugoslavia, Croatia, United States
- William Markowitz – United States (1907–1998)
- Laurence D. Marks – United States (born 1954)
- Robert Marshak – United States (1916–1992)
- Walter Marshall – U.K. (1932–1996)
- Toshihide Maskawa – Japan (1940–2021), Nobel laureate
- Harrie Massey – Australia (1908–1983)
- John Cromwell Mather – United States (born 1946), Nobel laureate
- James Clerk Maxwell – U.K. (1831–1879)
- Brian May – U.K. (born 1947)
- Maria Goeppert Mayer – Germany, United States (1906–1972)
- Arthur B. McDonald – Canada (born 1943), Nobel laureate
- Ronald E. McNair – United States (1950–1986)
- Anna McPherson – Canadian (1901–1979)
- Simon van der Meer – Netherlands (1925–2011), Nobel laureate
- Lise Meitner – Austria (1878–1968)
- Fulvio Melia – United States (born 1956)
- Macedonio Melloni – Italy (1798–1854)
- Adrian Melott – United States (born 1947)
- Thomas Corwin Mendenhall – United States (1841–1924)
- M. G. K. Menon – India (1928–2016)
- David Merritt – United States
- Albert Abraham Michelson – United States (1852–1931), Nobel laureate
- Arthur Alan Middleton – United States
- Stanislav Mikheyev – Soviet Union, Russia (1940–2011)
- Robert Andrews Millikan – United States (1868–1953), Nobel laureate
- Robert Mills – United States (1927–1999)
- Arthur Milne – U.K. (1896–1950)
- Shiraz Minwalla – India (born 1972)
- Bedangadas Mohanty – India (born 1973)
- Rabindra Nath Mohapatra – India, United States (born 1944)
- Kathryn Moler – United States
- Tanya Monro – Australia (born 1973)
- John J. Montgomery – United States (1858–1911)
- Jagadeesh Moodera – India, United States (born 1950)
- Merritt Moore – United States (born 1988)
- Henry Moseley – U.K. (1887–1915)
- Rudolf Mössbauer – Germany (1929–2011), Nobel laureate
- Nevill Mott – U.K. (1905–1996), Nobel laureate
- Ben Roy Mottelson – Denmark, United States (1926–2022), Nobel laureate
- Amédée Mouchez – Spain, France (1821–1892)
- Ali Moustafa – Egypt (1898–1950)
- José Enrique Moyal – Ottoman Empire, Mandatory Palestine, France, U.K., United States, Australia (1910–1998)
- Christine Muschik – Germany
- Karl Alexander Müller – Switzerland (1927–2023), Nobel laureate
- Richard A. Muller – United States (born 1944)
- Robert S. Mulliken – United States (1896–1986)
- Pieter van Musschenbroek – Netherlands (1692–1762)

== N ==
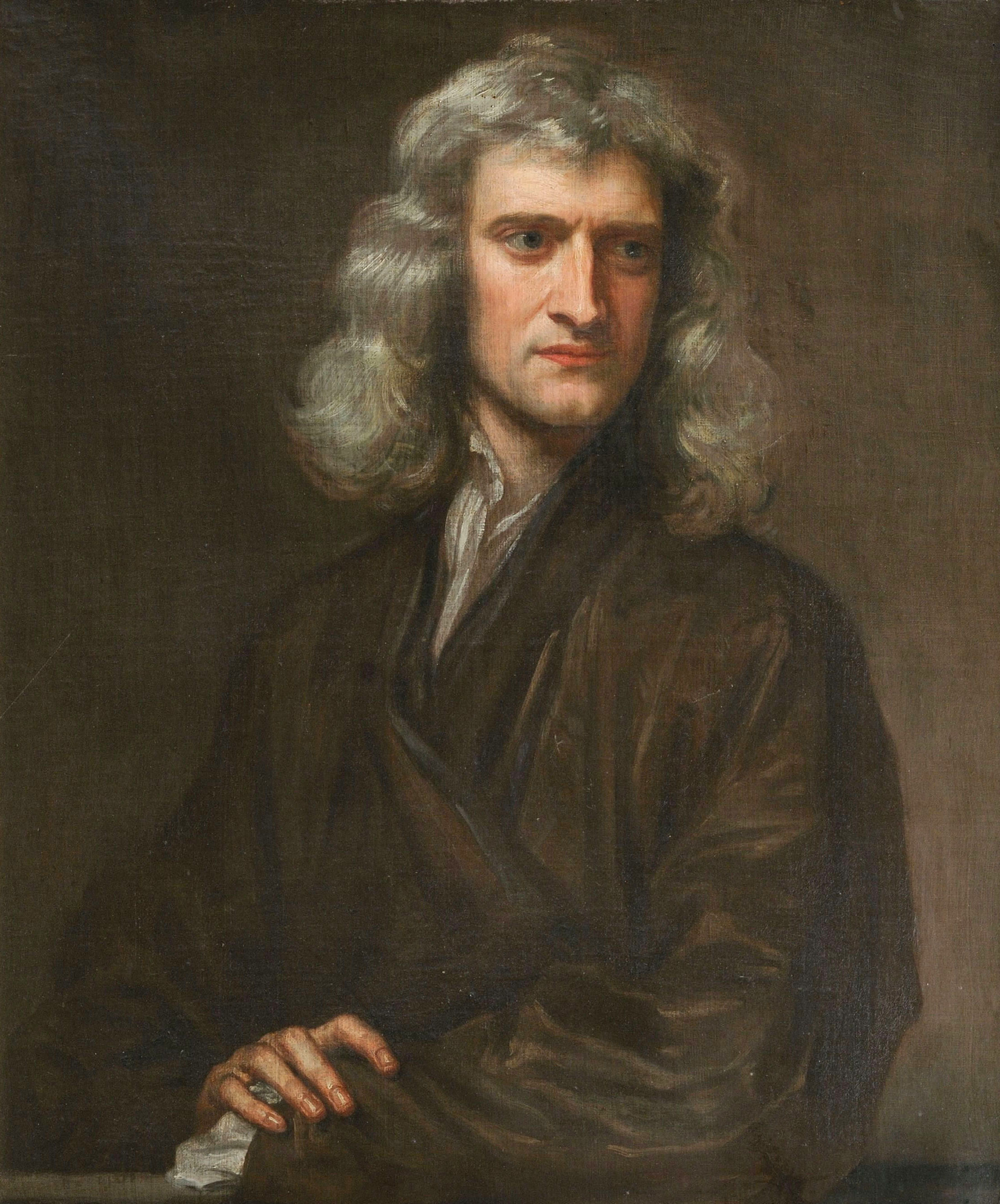
Sir Isaac Newton in 1689

- Yoichiro Nambu – Japan, United States (1921–2015), Nobel laureate
- Meenakshi Narain – United States (1964–2022)
- Jayant Narlikar – India (1938–2025)
- Quirino Navarro – Filipino nuclear physicist and chemist (1936–2002)
- Seth Neddermeyer – United States (1907–1988)
- Louis Néel – France (1904–2000), Nobel laureate
- Yuval Ne'eman – Mandatory Palestine, Israel (1925–2006)
- Ann Nelson – United States (1958–2019)
- John von Neumann – Austria-Hungary, United States (1903–1957)
- Simon Newcomb – United States (1835–1909)
- Sir Isaac Newton – England (1642–1727)
- Edward P. Ney – United States (1920–1996)
- Kendal Nezan – France, Kurdistan (born 1949)
- Holger Bech Nielsen – Denmark (born 1941)
- Leopoldo Nobili – Grand Duchy of Tuscany (1784–1835)
- Emmy Noether – Germany (1882–1935)
- Lothar Nordheim – Germany (1899–1985)
- Gunnar Nordström – Russian Empire, Finland (1881–1923)
- Johann Gottlieb Nörremberg – Germany (1787–1862)
- Konstantin Novoselov – Soviet Union, Russia, U.K. (born 1974), Nobel laureate
- H. Pierre Noyes – United States (1923–2016)
- John Nye – U.K. (1923–2019)

== O ==
- Yuri Oganessian – Soviet Union, Russia (born 1933)
- Georg Ohm – Germany (1789–1854)
- Hideo Ohno – Japan (born 1954)
- Susumu Okubo – Japan, United States (1930–2015)
- Sir Mark Oliphant – Australia (1901–2000)
- David Olive – U.K. (1937–2012)
- Zaira Ollano – Italy (1904–1997)
- Gerard K. O'Neill – United States (1927–1992)
- Heike Kamerlingh Onnes – Netherlands (1853–1926)
- Lars Onsager – Norway (1903–1976)
- Robert Oppenheimer – United States (1904–1967)
- Nicole Oresme – France (1325–1382)
- Yuri Orlov – Soviet Union, United States (1924–2020)
- Leonard Salomon Ornstein – Netherlands (1880–1941)
- Egon Orowan – Austria-Hungary, United States (1901–1989)
- Hans Christian Ørsted – Denmark (1777–1851)
- Douglas Dean Osheroff – United States (born 1945), Nobel laureate
- Silke Ospelkaus – Germany
- Mikhail Vasilievich Ostrogradsky – Russian Empire (1801–1862)

== P ==
- Thanu Padmanabhan – India (1957–2021)
- Heinz Pagels – United States (1939–1988)
- Abraham Pais – Netherlands, United States (1918–2000)
- Wolfgang K. H. Panofsky – Germany, United States (1919–2007)
- Giorgio Parisi – Italy (born 1948), Nobel laureate
- Blaise Pascal – France (1623–1662)
- John Pasta – United States (1918–1984)
- Sabrina Gonzalez Pasterski – United States (born 1993)
- Amalia Patanè – Italian professor of physics at the University of Nottingham
- Jogesh Pati – United States (born 1937)
- Petr Paucek – United States
- Stephen Paul – United States (1953–2012)
- Wolfgang Paul – Germany (1913–1993), Nobel laureate
- Wolfgang Pauli – Austria-Hungary (1900–1958), Nobel laureate
- Cecilia Payne-Gaposchkin – United States (1900–1979), astronomer and astrophysicist
- Ruby Payne-Scott – Australia (1912–1981)
- George B. Pegram – United States (1876–1958)
- Rudolf Peierls – Germany, U.K. (1907–1995)
- Jean Peltier – France (1785–1845)
- Roger Penrose – U.K. (born 1931), Wolf laureate, mathematician
- Arno Allan Penzias – United States (1933–2024), Nobel laureate, electrical engineer
- Martin Lewis Perl – United States (1927–2014), Nobel laureate
- Saul Perlmutter – United States (born 1959), Nobel laureate
- Jean Baptiste Perrin – France (1870–1942), Nobel laureate
- Mario Petrucci – U.K. (born 1958)
- Konstantin Petrzhak – Russian Empire, Soviet Union, Russia (1907–1998)
- Bernhard Philberth – Germany (1927–2010)
- William Daniel Phillips – United States (born 1948), Nobel laureate
- Max Planck – Germany (1858–1947), Nobel laureate
- Joseph Plateau – Belgium (1801–1883)
- Milton S. Plesset – United States (1908–1991)
- Ward Plummer – United States (1940–2020)
- Boris Podolsky – Russian Empire, Soviet Union (1896–1966)
- Henri Poincaré – France (1854–1912), mathematician
- Eric Poisson – Canada (born 1965)
- Siméon Denis Poisson – France (1781–1840), mathematician
- Balthasar van der Pol – Netherlands (1889–1959), electrical engineer
- Joseph Polchinski – United States (1954–2018)
- Hugh David Politzer – United States (born 1949), Nobel laureate
- John Polkinghorne – U.K. (1930–2021)
- Julianne Pollard-Larkin – United States
- Alexander M. Polyakov – Soviet Union, United States (born 1945)
- Bruno Pontecorvo – Italy, Soviet Union, Russia (1913–1993)
- Heraclides Ponticus – Greece (387–312 BC)
- Heinz Pose – Germany (1905–1975)
- Cecil Frank Powell – U.K. (1903–1969), Nobel laureate
- John Henry Poynting – U.K. (1852–1914)
- Ludwig Prandtl – Germany (1875–1953)
- Willibald Peter Prasthofer – Austria (1917–1993)
- Ilya Prigogine – Belgium (1917–2003)
- Alexander Prokhorov – Russian Empire, Soviet Union, Russia (1916–2002), Nobel laureate
- William Prout – U.K. (1785–1850)
- Luigi Puccianti – Italy (1875–1952)
- Ivan Pulyuy – Austrian Empire, Austria-Hungary (1845–1918)
- Mihajlo Idvorski Pupin – Austrian Empire, Austria-Hungary, Serbia, United States (1858–1935)
- Edward Mills Purcell – United States (1912–1997), Nobel laureate

== Q ==
- Xuesen Qian – China (1911–2009)
- Abu sahl Al-Quhi – İran (born 940)
- Helen Quinn – Australia, United States (born 1943)

== R ==
- Raúl Rabadán – United States
- Gabriele Rabel – Austria, U.K. (1880–1963)
- Isidor Isaac Rabi – Austria, United States (1898–1988), Nobel laureate
- Giulio Racah – Italian-Israeli (1909–1965)
- James Rainwater – United States (1917–1986), Nobel laureate
- Mark G. Raizen – United States (born 1955)
- Alladi Ramakrishnan – British Empire, India (1923–2008)
- Chandrasekhara Venkata Raman – British Empire, India (1888–1970), Nobel laureate
- Edward Ramberg – United States (1907–1995)
- Carl Ramsauer – Germany (1879–1955)
- Norman Foster Ramsey, Jr. – United States (1915–2011), Nobel laureate
- Lisa Randall – United States (born 1962)
- Georges J. Ranque – France (1898–1973)
- Riccardo Rattazzi – Italy (born 1964)
- Lord Rayleigh – U.K. (1842–1919), Nobel laureate
- René Antoine Ferchault de Réaumur – France (1683–1757)
- Sidney Redner – Canada, United States (born 1951)
- Martin John Rees – U.K. (born 1942)
- Hubert Reeves – Canada (born 1932)
- Tullio Regge – Italy (1931–2014)
- Frederick Reines – United States (1918–1998), Nobel laureate
- Louis Rendu – France (1789–1859)
- Osborne Reynolds – U.K. (1842–1912)
- Owen Willans Richardson – U.K. (1879–1959), Nobel laureate
- Robert Coleman Richardson – United States (1937–2013), Nobel laureate
- Burton Richter – United States (1931–2018), Nobel laureate
- Floyd K. Richtmyer – United States (1881–1939)
- Robert D. Richtmyer – United States (1910–2003)
- Charlotte Riefenstahl – Germany (1899–1993)
- Nikolaus Riehl – Germany (1901–1990)
- Adam Riess – United States (born 1969), Nobel laureate
- Karl-Heinrich Riewe – Germany
- Walther Ritz – Switzerland (1878–1909)
- Étienne-Gaspard Robert – Belgium (1763–1837)
- Heinrich Rohrer – Switzerland (1933–2013), Nobel laureate
- Joseph Romm – United States (1960–2026)
- Wilhelm Conrad Röntgen – Germany (1845–1923), Nobel laureate
- Clemens C. J. Roothaan – Netherlands (1918–2019)
- Nathan Rosen – United States, Israel (1909–1995)
- Marshall Rosenbluth – United States (1927–2003)
- Yasha Rosenfeld – Israel (1948–2002)
- Carl-Gustav Arvid Rossby – Sweden, United States (1898–1957)
- Bruno Rossi – Italy, United States (1905–1993)
- Joseph Rotblat – Russian Empire, Poland, U.K. (1908–2005)
- Carlo Rovelli – Italy (born 1956)
- Mary Laura Chalk Rowles – United States (1904–1996)
- Subrata Roy – India, United States
- Carlo Rubbia – Italy (born 1934), Nobel laureate
- Vera Rubin – United States (1928–2016)
- Serge Rudaz – Canada, United States (born 1954)
- David Ruelle – Belgium, France (born 1935)
- Ernst August Friedrich Ruska – Germany (1906–1988), Nobel laureate
- Ernest Rutherford – New Zealand, U.K. (1871–1937)
- Janne Rydberg – Sweden (1854–1919)
- Martin Ryle – U.K. (1918–1984), Nobel laureate

== S ==
- Subir Sachdev – United States (born 1961)
- Mendel Sachs – United States (1927–2012)
- Rainer K. Sachs – Germany and United States (born 1932)
- Robert G. Sachs – United States (1916–1999)
- Carl Sagan – United States (1934–1996)
- Georges-Louis le Sage – Switzerland (1724–1803)
- Georges Sagnac – France (1869–1926)
- Meghnad Saha – Bengali India (1893–1956)
- Shoichi Sakata – Japan (1911–1970)
- Andrei Dmitrievich Sakharov – Soviet Union (1929–1989)
- Oscar Sala – Brazil (1922–2010)
- Abdus Salam – Pakistan (1926–1996), Nobel laureate
- Edwin Ernest Salpeter – Austria, Australia, United States (1924–2008)
- Anthony Ichiro Sanda – Japan, United States (born 1944)
- Leonard Sander – United States (living)
- Antonella De Santo – Italy, U.K.
- Vikram Sarabhai – India (1919–1971)
- Isidor Sauers – Austria (born 1948)
- Félix Savart – France (1791–1841)
- Brendan Scaife – Ireland (born 1928)
- Martin Schadt – Switzerland (born 1938)
- Arthur Leonard Schawlow – United States (1921–1999), Nobel laureate
- Craige Schensted – United States
- Joël Scherk – France (1946–1979)
- Otto Scherzer – Germany (1909–1982)
- Brian Schmidt – Australia, United States (born 1967), Nobel laureate
- Alan Schoen – United States (1924–2023)
- Walter H. Schottky – Germany (1886–1976)
- Kees A. Schouhamer Immink – Netherlands (born 1946)
- John Robert Schrieffer – United States (1931–2019), Nobel laureate
- Erwin Schrödinger – Austria-Hungary, Austria, Ireland (1887–1961), Nobel laureate
- John Henry Schwarz – United States (born 1941)
- Melvin Schwartz – United States (1932–2006), Nobel laureate
- Karl Schwarzschild – German Empire (1876–1916)
- Julian Schwinger – United States (1918–1994), Nobel laureate
- Dennis William Sciama – U.K. (1926–1999)
- Marlan Scully – United States (born 1939)
- Bice Sechi-Zorn – Italy, United States (1928–1984)
- Thomas Johann Seebeck – Estonia (1770–1831)
- Raymond Seeger – United States (1906–1992)
- Emilio G. Segre – Italy, United States (1905–1989), Nobel laureate
- Nathan Seiberg – United States (born 1956)
- Frederick Seitz – United States (1911–2008)
- Nikolay Semyonov – Russia (1896–1986)
- Ashoke Sen – India (born 1956)
- Hiranmay Sen Gupta – Bangladesh (1934–2022)
- Robert Serber – United States (1909–1997)
- Roman U. Sexl – Austria (1939–1986)
- Shen Kuo – China (1031–1095)
- Mikhail Shifman – Russia, United States (born 1949)
- Dmitry Shirkov – Russia (1928–2016)
- William Shockley – United States (1910–1989), Nobel laureate
- Boris Shraiman – United States (1956)
- Lev Shubnikov – Russia, Netherlands, Ukraine (1901–1937)
- Clifford Shull – United States (1915–2001), Nobel laureate
- Kai Siegbahn – Sweden (1918–2007), Nobel laureate
- Manne Siegbahn – Sweden (1886–1978), Nobel laureate
- Ludwik Silberstein – Poland, Germany, Italy, United States, Canada (1872–1948)
- Eva Silverstein – United States (born 1970)
- John Alexander Simpson – United States (1916–2000)
- Willem de Sitter – Netherlands (1872–1934)
- Uri Sivan – Israel (born 1955)
- Tamitha Skov – United States space weather physicist, researcher and public speaker
- G. V. Skrotskii – Russia (1915–1992)
- Francis G. Slack – United States (1897–1985)
- John C. Slater – United States (1900–1976)
- Louis Slotin – United States (1910–1946)
- Alexei Yuryevich Smirnov – Russia, Italy (born 1951)
- George E. Smith – United States (1930–2025), Nobel laureate
- Lee Smolin – United States (born 1955)
- Marian Smoluchowski – Poland (1872–1917)
- George Smoot – United States (1945–2025), Nobel laureate
- Willebrord Snell – Netherlands (1580–1626)
- Arsenij Sokolov – Russia (1910–1986)
- Arnold Sommerfeld – Germany (1868–1951)
- Haim Sompolinsky – Israel (born 1949)
- Bent Sørensen – Denmark (born 1941)
- Rafael Sorkin – United States (born 1945)
- Zeinabou Mindaoudou Souley (1964–), nuclear physicist from Niger
- Nicola Spaldin – U.K. (born 1969)
- Maria Spiropulu – Greece (born 1970)
- Henry Stapp – United States (born 1928)
- Johannes Stark – Germany (1874–1957), Nobel laureate
- Max Steenbeck (1901–1981)
- Joseph Stefan – Austria-Hungary, Slovenia (1835–1893)
- Jack Steinberger – Germany, United States (1921–2020), Nobel laureate
- Paul J. Steinhardt – United States (born 1952)
- Carl August Steinheil – Germany (1801–1870)
- George Sterman – United States (born 1946)
- Otto Stern – Germany (1888–1969), Nobel laureate
- Simon Stevin – Belgium, Netherlands (1548–1620)
- Thomas H. Stix – United States (1924–2001)
- George Gabriel Stokes – Ireland, U.K. (1819–1903)
- Aleksandr Stoletov – Russia (1839–1896)
- Horst Ludwig Störmer – Germany (born 1949), Nobel laureate
- Leonard Strachan – United States, astrophysicist
- Julius Adams Stratton – United States
- Donna Strickland – Canada (born 1959), Nobel laureate
- Andrew Strominger – United States (born 1955)
- Audrey Stuckes – U.K. (1923–2006)
- Ernst Stueckelberg – Switzerland (1905–1984)
- George Sudarshan – India, United States (1931–2018)
- Rashid Sunyaev – USSR (born 1943)
- Oleg Sushkov – USSR, Australia (born 1950)
- Leonard Susskind – United States (born 1940)
- Joseph Swan – U.K. (1828–1914)
- Jean Henri van Swinden – Netherlands (1746–1823)
- Bertha Swirles – U.K. (1903–1999)
- Leo Szilard – Austria-Hungary, United States (1898–1964)

== T ==
- Rachel Takserman-Krozer – Ukraine (1921–1987)
- Igor Yevgenyevich Tamm – Imperial Russia, Soviet Union (1895–1971), Nobel laureate
- Abraham H. Taub – United States (1911–1999)
- Geoffrey Ingram Taylor – U.K. (1886–1975)
- Joseph Hooton Taylor, Jr. – United States (born 1941), Nobel laureate
- Richard Edward Taylor – United States (1929–2018), Nobel laureate
- Max Tegmark – Sweden, United States (born 1967)
- Valentine Telegdi – Hungary, United States (1922–2006), Wolf laureate
- Edward Teller – Austria-Hungary, United States (1908–2003)
- Igor Ternov – Russia (1921–1996)
- Peter Adolf Thiessen – Germany (1899–1990)
- George Paget Thomson – U.K. (1892–1975), Nobel laureate
- J. J. Thomson – U.K. (1856–1940), Nobel laureate
- William Thomson (Lord Kelvin) – Ireland, U.K. (1824–1907)
- Charles Thorn – United States (born 1946)
- Kip Stephen Thorne – United States (born 1940)
- Samuel Chao Chung Ting – United States (born 1936), Nobel laureate
- Frank J. Tipler – United States (born 1947)
- Ernest William Titterton – U.K., Australia (1916–1990)
- Yoshinori Tokura – Japan (born 1954)
- Samuel Tolansky – U.K. (1907–1973)
- Orlando E. Toledo Morales -- Chile (born 1964)
- Sin-Itiro Tomonaga – Japan (1906–1979), Nobel laureate
- Lewi Tonks – United States (1897–1971)
- Akira Tonomura – Japan (1942–2012)
- Evangelista Torricelli – Italy (1608–1647)
- Yoji Totsuka – Japan (1942–2008)
- Bruno Touschek – Italy (1921–1978)
- Charles Townes – United States (1915–2015), Nobel laureate
- John Townsend – U.K. (1868–1957)
- Johann Georg Tralles – Germany (1763–1822)
- Sam Treiman – United States (1925–1999)
- Vipin Kumar Tripathi – India (born 1948)
- Daniel Chee Tsui – China, United States (born 1939), Nobel laureate
- John J. Turin – United States (1913–1973)
- Neil Turok – South Africa (born 1958)
- Sergei Tyablikov – Russia (1921–1968)
- John Tyndall – U.K. (1820–1893)
- Neil deGrasse Tyson – United States (born 1958)

== U ==
- George Eugene Uhlenbeck – Netherlands, United States (1900–1988)
- Stanislaw Ulam – Poland, United States (1909–1984)
- Nikolay Umov – Russia (1846–1915)
- Juris Upatnieks – Latvia, United States (1936–2026)

== V ==
- Cumrun Vafa – Iran, United States (born 1960)
- Oriol Valls (born 1947 in Barcelona, Spain), university physics professor
- Léon Van Hove – Belgium (1924–1990)
- Sergei Vavilov – Soviet Union (1891–1951)
- Vlatko Vedral – U.K., Serbia (born 1971)
- Evgeny Velikhov – Russia (born 1935)
- Martinus J. G. Veltman – Netherlands, United States (1931–2021), Nobel laureate
- Gabriele Veneziano – Italy (born 1942)
- Giovanni Battista Venturi – Italy (1746–1822)
- Émile Verdet – France (1824–1866)
- Erik Verlinde – Netherlands (1962)
- Herman Verlinde – Netherlands (1962)
- Jean-Pierre Vigier – France (1920–2004)
- Gaetano Vignola – Italy
- Leonardo da Vinci – Italy (1452–1519)
- Anatoly Vlasov – Russia (1908–1975)
- John Hasbrouck van Vleck – United States (1899–1980), Nobel laureate
- Woldemar Voigt – Germany (1850–1919)
- Burchard de Volder – Netherlands (1643–1709)
- Max Volmer – Germany (1885–1965)
- Alessandro Volta – Italy (1745–1827)
- Wernher von Braun – Germany (1912–1977), aerospace engineer

== W ==
- Johannes Diderik van der Waals – Netherlands (1837–1923), Nobel laureate
- James Wait – Canada (1924–1998)
- Ludwig Waldmann – Germany (1913–1980)
- Alan Walsh – U.K., Australia (1916–1988)
- Ernest Walton – Ireland (1903–1995), Nobel laureate
- Dezhao Wang – China (1905–1998)
- Enge Wang – China (born 1957)
- Huanyu Wang – China (1954–2018)
- Kan-Chang Wang – China (1907–1998)
- Pu (Paul) Wang – China (1902–1969)
- Zhuxi Wang – China (1911–1983)
- Aaldert Wapstra – Netherlands (1923–2006)
- John Clive Ward – England, Australia (1924–2000)
- Gleb Wataghin – Ukraine, Italy, Brazil (1896–1986)
- John James Waterston – U.K. (1811–1883)
- Alan Andrew Watson – U.K. (born 1938)
- James Watt – U.K. (1736–1819)
- Denis Weaire – Ireland (born 1942)
- Colin Webb – U.K. (born 1937)
- Wilhelm Weber – Germany (1804–1891)
- Katherine Weimer – United States (1919–2000)
- Alvin Weinberg – United States (1915–2006)
- Steven Weinberg – United States (1933–2021), Nobel laureate
- Silke Weinfurtner – Germany
- Rainer Weiss – United States (1932–2025), Nobel laureate
- Victor Frederick Weisskopf – Austria, United States (1908–2002)
- Carl Friedrich von Weizsäcker – Germany (1912–2007)
- Heinrich Welker – Germany (1912–1981)
- Gregor Wentzel – Germany (1898–1978)
- Paul Werbos – United States (born 1947)
- Siebren van der Werf – Netherlands (born 1942)
- Peter Westervelt – United States (1919–2015)
- Christof Wetterich – Germany (born 1952)
- Hermann Weyl – Germany (1885–1955)
- John Archibald Wheeler – United States (1911–2008)
- Gian-Carlo Wick – Italy (1909–1992)
- Emil Wiechert – Prussia (1861–1928)
- Carl Wieman – United States (born 1951), Nobel laureate
- Wilhelm Wien – Germany (1864–1928), Nobel laureate
- Arthur Wightman – United States (1922–2013)
- Eugene Wigner – Austria-Hungary, United States (1902–1993), Nobel laureate
- Frank Wilczek – United States (born 1951), Nobel laureate
- Charles Thomson Rees Wilson – U.K. (1869–1959), Nobel laureate
- Christine Wilson – Canadian-American physicist and astronomer
- Kenneth Geddes Wilson – United States (1936–2013), Nobel laureate
- Robert R. Wilson – United States (1914–2000), Nobel laureate
- Robert Woodrow Wilson – United States (born 1936)
- John R. Winckler – United States (1918–2001)
- David J. Wineland – United States (born 1944), Nobel laureate
- Karl Wirtz – Germany (1910–1994)
- Mark B. Wise – Canada, United States (1953–2026)
- Edward Witten – United States (born 1951)
- Emil Wolf – Czechoslovakia, United States (1922–2018)
- Fred Alan Wolf – United States (born 1934)
- Lincoln Wolfenstein – United States (1923–2015)
- Stephen Wolfram – U.K. (born 1959)
- Ewald Wollny – Germany (1846–1901)
- Michael Woolfson – U.K. (1927–2019)
- Chien-Shiung Wu – United States (1912–1997)
- Sau Lan Wu – United States (born early 1940s)
- Tai Tsun Wu – United States (1933–2024)

== X ==
- Basilis C. Xanthopoulos – Greece (1951–1990)

== Y ==
- Rosalyn Yalow – United States (1921–2011)
- Chen Ning Yang – China (1922–2025), Nobel laureate
- Félix Ynduráin – Spain (born 1946)
- Francisco José Ynduráin – Spain (1940–2008)
- Kenneth Young – United States, China (born 1947)
- Thomas Young – U.K. (1773–1829)
- Hideki Yukawa – Japan (1907–1981), Nobel laureate

== Z ==
- Jan Zaanen – Netherlands (born 1957)
- Daniel Zajfman – Israel (born 1959)
- Anthony Zee – United States (born 1945)
- Pieter Zeeman – Netherlands (1865–1943), Nobel laureate
- Ludwig Zehnder – Switzerland (1854–1949)
- Anton Zeilinger – Austria (born 1945)
- Yakov Borisovich Zel'dovich – Russia (1914–1987)
- John Zeleny – United States (1872–1951)
- Frits Zernike – Netherlands (1888–1960), Nobel laureate
- Antonino Zichichi – Italy (1929–2026)
- Hans Ziegler – Switzerland, United States (1910–1985)
- Karl Zimmer – Germany (1911–1988)
- Georges Zissis – Greece (born 1964)
- Peter Zoller – Austria (born 1952)
- Zongfu Yu – United States (living)
- Dmitry Zubarev – Russia (1917–1992)
- Bruno Zumino – Italy (1923–2014)
- Wojciech H. Zurek – Poland, United States (born 1951)
- Robert Zwanzig – United States (1928–2014)
- George Zweig – United States (born 1937)
- Fritz Zwicky – Bulgaria, United States (1898–1974)
- Barton Zwiebach – United States (born 1954)
