= Erhard Kietz =

German physicist

- Born: Erhard Karl Kietz; August 22, 1909; Leipzig, Germany
- Died: April 6, 1982 (aged 72); Blütlingen, Wustrow, Lower Saxony, Germany
- Occupation: Physicist

Dr. Erhard Karl Kietz (August 22, 1909 – April 6, 1982) was a German-born physicist, who researched frequency constancy of video signals.

== Life ==
Born August 22, 1909, in Leipzig, Germany as the eldest child of mathematics teacher Georg and Anna Kietz, Erhard Karl Kietz attended the St Nicholas School (Nikolaischule) in Leipzig and then studied physics, mathematics and chemistry at the University of Leipzig. He was awarded the Doctorate of Science degree in Feb. 1938. Taking on the study of these various science branches enabled him to gain an overview of the various aspects of a situation. Along that line, he also had an independent, critical view of political proceedings. He was very interested in politics but opposed the extremism that he saw arising within nations. During his studies at the university, he was an assistant to Dr. August Karolus, television pioneer, in the laboratory of the Physical Institute of the University from May 1929 to Feb. 1938. From March 1938 until May 1945, he conducted independent research in the same laboratory as physicist in the fields of television, high frequency and amplification technology. Aside from television, his major field of work was the origination of extremely constant oscillation through tuning forks and oscillating crystals. During World War II, he was twice buried in the rubble of bomb attacks on the Institute of Physics at the University of Leipzig.

On August 9, 1941, he married Gisela Raschig, born June 1, 1917. On June 15, 1945, they, with their two young children and his lab colleague, Dr. Herbert Mangold, with wife and toddler daughter, were evacuated by the U.S.A. military to the outskirts of Munich. In 1947, their eldest son died from sepsis at the age of five. A middle ear infection during the difficult last months of the war left the bacteria in his system and lack of penicillin in the post-war turmoil rendered a cure unattainable.

On May 15, 1956, he, with his family which now included 6 children ages 11 to 9 months, boarded the Dutch freighter Witmarsum of the Independent Gulf Lines in Hamburg, Germany for emigration to the United States.

On June 10, 1956, the family arrived in Houston, Texas, from there riding the 441 miles southward by bus to their destination Elsa, Texas. There was no work in his field, however; so in September 1956, the family moved to Altadena, California, on the advice of a German friend, who had emigrated a few years before. Here Dr. Erhard Kietz was employed in the research division of Consolidated Electrodynamics Corporation in Pasadena, where he participated in the design of instrumentation recording equipment under Adrian B. Cook. In January 1959, the family moved to Menlo Park in the San Francisco Bay area, during the development of the area into Silicon Valley. Dr. Kietz joined Ampex Corporation in Redwood City, California, as Staff Electrical Engineer of the Research and Engineering Division headed by Charles P. Ginsburg.

Unfortunately he felt displaced in American society. Longing for his home country grew; he and his wife considered options to return to Germany. In July 1971, he, along with his two youngest daughters, who were still teenagers (his wife died in a car accident in 1967), departed New York for Bremerhaven on the passenger ship Bremen, locating in Dankoltsweiler (Baden-Württemberg), Germany. He died April 6, 1982, in Blütlingen (Lower Saxony), Germany.

== Personality ==
He was an accomplished cellist who also played the piano well. His passionate love of classical music can be traced to his upbringing in an extended musical family who enthusiastically attended concerts and played music in the home in Leipzig. He loved playing in the orchestras of Leipzig before World War II and of Munich after the War. A middle ear infection in his youth left him hard of hearing which put an end to any dreams of orchestral participation later on. This condition cast a large shadow over him. He did, however, retain an ear for perfect pitch (from another room in the house during his daughter's piano practice: "F-SHARP, not F, can't you hear that!").

He was a man of integrity and modesty, committed to his family and aware of the need to pass on guiding values to his children, though his authoritative tone often made them unreceptive at the time. Over the years, they came to recognize the lessons he imparted: intellectual curiosity, an interest in classical music and nature, and a desire to explore the world—whether on bicycle trips to nearby villages south of Munich, mountain hikes, or trips across California by bus and later in a used station wagon. Raising six children with limited means, he prioritized experiences like concerts and travel over material comfort, believing these would leave lasting impressions, and he also ensured his children could understand complex scientific concepts by explaining them in age-appropriate ways, connecting practical experience with learning.

He had a staunch belief in the truth of the Bible but was aware of mistakes in translations. Therefore, he made it his life's study to compare different translations. He had an unwavering faith in a forgiving God and a sustaining hope of salvation and paradise.

As a small boy, he endured World War I and he came of age in the terrible time between wars. As a new family man, he survived World War II. Those experiences developed in him a reluctance to contribute to warfare in any way. He was averse to science serving military development, yet his qualifications made it near impossible to escape a career serving foremost military interests with only later a jump of those products to civilian use. On the other hand, the technology he developed contributed, through the radar and video flights over the Soviet Union and Cuba (1962), to a more realistic, much lower, assessment of ballistic missiles need, as well as prevention of surprise attacks, for it was seen that the number of missiles in the Soviet Union was in reality from one fourths to only one tenths of what had been surmised. The arrival and readying of Soviet missiles in Cuba could be seen and thus, measures to get the Soviet Union to remove them could be taken before harm was done.

In a letter dated March 1965, to his eldest daughter, who was studying at university, he wrote:

"In my opinion, there is no more satisfying purpose in life than to live the life of a researcher – with the exception of having a fine family."

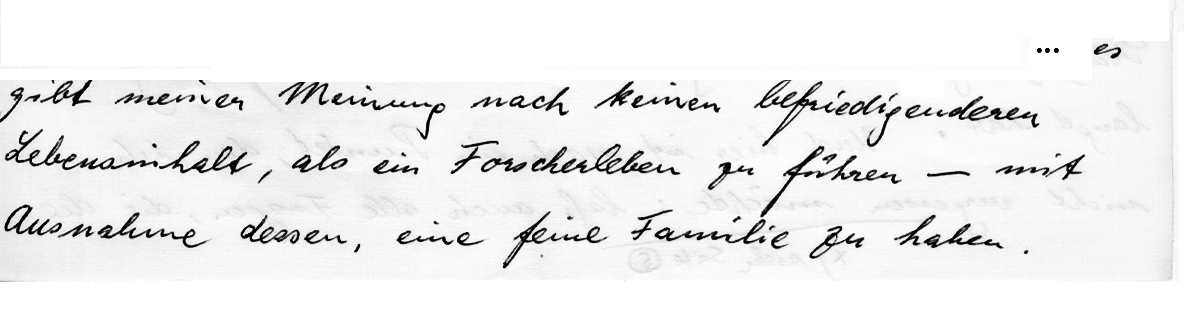

== Scientific contributions ==
Erhard Karl Kietz’ scientific career began with his doctorate dissertation, released in February 1938, published in Dresden in 1939, Versuche über die Frequenzkonstanz elektrisch angetriebener Stimmgabeln (Experiments about the frequency constancy of electric tuning forks). This work was of great interest because one needed a very constant time measure for developing applications like radar and video.

The first electronic clocks that used a very accurate internal frequency mechanism contained a tiny electrically driven tuning fork which directly powered a very fine-toothed pinion; this was then geared down to the clock hands.

His early work in the development of television includes work on a 10–channel and a 200-channel television system for a giant picture display, a 1000-line television system and research on the behavior of photoelectric cells at high frequencies. Later he contributed considerably to the fundamental research and practical development of magnetic tape recording of high frequency signals, e.g. video signals.

The two daunting problems that needed to be solved were the high demand on time stability at playback and overcoming the bandwidth constraints of the hitherto existing magnetic recording technology. The demand for high bandwidth in recording was achieved with an assembly of four heads rotating very fast transverse to the tape. This rendered possible a very high head to tape speed with a slow tape run. By this means the bandwidth could be extended three orders of magnitude: from 18 kHz with customary stationary heads up to 20 MHz with rotating heads. In connection with this, a fast switching from one head to the next had to be solved. This principle of rotating heads was and is at the time of this writing employed by all professional and later by all home video tape recorders.

The time-base correction was at first accomplished with very complex technology (individual video lines were recorded on a rotating disc by means of a cathode beam and were scanned elsewhere in precise time grid by means of a second cathode beam), later realized by semi conductor circuits.

Dr. Erhard Kietz authored a Summary of Problems and Activities in Electronic Time Base Correction, released for Ampex Corporation on June 15, 1960. Here again, the concern is an exact time base with jitter of less than a tenth of a microsecond, without which video recorders cannot function.

Dr. Erhard Kietz’ Transient-free and Time-Stable Signal Reproduction from Rotating-Head Recorders was published in the National Space Electronics Symposium Record, 1963, Miami Beach, Florida, Paper 4.3. A Revision was published in February 1968.

In March 1967, he and his colleague Sid Damron authored the technical paper Digital Recording at Exceptionally High Bit Rates, Reliability and Density.

In April 1967, Dr. Erhard Kietz authored a presentation titled "Developments in the Magnetic Recording of Multimegahertz Bandwidths". It was presented by his colleague Sid S. Damron on April 25, at the Rome Air Development Center at Griffiss Air Force Base in New York for a Wide-Band Recording Symposium.

In 1968, Sid Damron and Erhard Kietz, working together at Ampex Corporation in Redwood City, California, published Exceptionally High-Density Data Recording in the periodical Modern Data December 1968 (pp. 28–31.)

Shortly before retiring from Ampex Corporation, Dr. Erhard Kietz authored a scientific paper titled Electronic Track Alignment of Digital Signals Recorded at High Density on a Multitrack Recorder. This treatise dealt with the change from analog to digital recording and the state of the research at the beginning of 1971.

The first applications were the radar signals of the polar radar stations, later radar signals and pictures from high-flying planes and soon after, high definition picture recordings of signals from satellites that orbited earth and transmitted their pictures to earth only to designated locations. In this summary it becomes clear how much smaller and lighter the instruments could successively be constructed.
The "latest" reel-to-reel tape recorder, as well as an example of the anti-missile applications of Ampex' Signal recording and transmission is seen in the articles of the Ampex Monitor 1961 Miniaturization was mainly achieved through the emerging transistor technology and, only a little later, through integrated circuits with rapidly growing complexity. When one sees the current video recording devices, one cannot even imagine anymore how much signal processing is necessary for video recording and play-back. The first video recorders were housed in several cabinets full of electronics.

Television video recording was practically a fall-out of the military application. From the end of the 1960s on into the 1980s, Ampex video tape recorders were utilized in television studios all over the world.

During his tenure at Ampex Corporation, Dr. Erhard Kietz developed four patented inventions, which were assigned to Ampex Corp.:

Patent-ID	Filing Date	Content
US3131384	29. August; 1960	Recording and reproducing system
US3304377	11. September 1961	Synchronizing system for video transducing apparatus utilizing composite information transducing and pilot signals
US3204047	19. March; 1962	Signal reproducing system with phase canellation of unsired signal component
US3536856	20. September 1967	Record-reproduce mode selection without mechanical relays

He was a co-participant in the development of other patents.

His sister Dr. Gertraud Kietz, 31 March 1913 – 11 August 2001, achieved high esteem as a child psychologist and author.
Overview of her life and work in German

== See also ==
- List of inventors
- List of physicists
- Spy satellite
- Crystal oscillator
- Quadruplex videotape
- Ampex
- History of science – physics
