= Christine Muschik =

Canadian quantum physicist

Academic background
- Education: Technical University of Munich B.Sc., M.Sc., PhD

Academic work
- Discipline: Quantum Communications
- Institutions: Institute for Quantum Computing, Institute for Quantum Optics and Quantum Information, The Institute of Photonic Sciences ICFO

Christine A. Muschik is an associate professor in the Department of Physics and Astronomy at the University of Waterloo as well as a part of the Institute for Quantum Computing. She completed her PhD in 2011 at the Max-Planck-Institute for Quantum Optics. She completed postdoctoral fellowships at the Institute for Quantum Optics and Quantum Information in Innsbruck and the Institute of Photonic Sciences in Castelldefels. As of 2020, she has over 2000 citations on over 50 publications. She has also been featured in several articles in Nature magazine, MIT Technology Review, and Physics World.

== Awards and honours ==
- 2020-2022 Azrieli Global Scholar by CIFAR
- 2019 Alfred P. Sloan Research Fellow of Physics
- 2018 Emmy Noether Fellowship to launch her investigation into quantum simulations of Lattice Gauge Theories

== Selected bibliography ==
Below is a list of the most commonly cited articles co-authored by Muschik, ordered by date of publication.

- Muschik, Christine A.; Polzik, Eugene S.; Cirac, J. Ignacio (2011-05-17). "Dissipatively driven entanglement of two macroscopic atomic ensembles". Physical Review A. 83 (5) 052312. arXiv:1007.2209. Bibcode:2011PhRvA..83e2312M. doi:10.1103/physreva.83.052312. ISSN 1050-2947. S2CID 118743044. According to Google Scholar, this article has been cited 142 times
- Krauter, Hanna; Muschik, Christine A.; Jensen, Kasper; Wasilewski, Wojciech; et al. (2011-08-17). "Entanglement Generated by Dissipation and Steady State Entanglement of Two Macroscopic Objects". Physical Review Letters. 107 (8) 080503. arXiv:1006.4344. Bibcode:2011PhRvL.107h0503K. doi:10.1103/physrevlett.107.080503. ISSN 0031-9007. PMID 21929153. S2CID 31316007. According to Google Scholar, it has been cited 511 times.
- Vollbrecht, Karl Gerd H.; Muschik, Christine A.; Cirac, J. Ignacio (2011-09-16). "Entanglement Distillation by Dissipation and Continuous Quantum Repeaters". Physical Review Letters. 107 (12) 120502. arXiv:1011.4115. Bibcode:2011PhRvL.107l0502V. doi:10.1103/physrevlett.107.120502. ISSN 0031-9007. PMID 22026761. S2CID 30605222. According to Google Scholar, this article has been cited 102 times
- Krauter, H.; Salart, D.; Muschik, C. A.; Petersen, J. M.; et al. (2013-06-02). "Deterministic quantum teleportation between distant atomic objects". Nature Physics. 9 (7): 400–404. arXiv:1212.6746. Bibcode:2013NatPh...9..400K. doi:10.1038/nphys2631. ISSN 1745-2473. S2CID 118724313.
- Martinez, Esteban A.; Muschik, Christine A.; Schindler, Philipp; Nigg, Daniel; et al. (2016). "Real-time dynamics of lattice gauge theories with a few-qubit quantum computer". Nature. 534 (7608): 516–519. arXiv:1605.04570. Bibcode:2016Natur.534..516M. doi:10.1038/nature18318. ISSN 0028-0836. PMID 27337339. S2CID 4462071.
