= John J. Turin =

American mathematician

John J. Turin (1913–1973) was an American mathematician and physicist, especially active in the field of astronomy.

== Education & Career ==
Turin received his bachelor's and master's degrees from Wayne State University and his doctorate in nuclear physics from the University of Michigan.

He was a member of the University of Toledo faculty from 1946 until his death in 1973. He became the head of the graduate school in 1969. He was director of the Ritter Astrophysical Research Center of the University of Toledo, Ohio. A number of patents, many with respect to heat convection, are on his name.

== Death ==
He died in December 1973 at age 60. After his death, several awards were named after him, including the John J. Turin Memorial Service Award and the John J. Turin Award for Outstanding Career Accomplishments in Physics, both awarded to him posthumously by the University of Toledo.

== Selected publications ==
- Gas-air-oxygen combustion studies, 1951
- Articles in The Astronomical Journal
