= Orion Ciftja =

Physicist

- Born: November 27, 1967 (age 58); Shkodër, Albania
- Education: International School for Advanced Studies (SISSA/ISAS), Trieste, Italy
- Awards: Fellow of the American Physical Society
- Scientific career
- Fields: Theoretical physics
- Workplaces: Prairie View A&M University

Orion Ciftja is an Albanian-American physicist and tenured professor at Prairie View A&M University. He is a Fellow of the American Physical Society. Ciftja specializes in theoretical physics with strong emphasis in condensed matter physics. His main areas of interest are quantum hall effect, nanoscale structures, and strongly correlated electronic systems.

== Awards ==
Orion Ciftja has been awarded several National Science Foundation research grants. He also received the distinguished honor of being the KITP scholar in the years 2007–2009. He is a recipient of the Texas A&M University System Teaching Excellence Award on several occasions.

== Selected publications ==
Ciftja has published over 100 refereed papers, has more than 10,000 reads, and has more than 1000 citations to his work.

- Two-dimensional quantum-dot helium in a magnetic field: Variational theory, O Ciftja, MG Faruk, Physical Review B 72 (20), 205334 68 2005
- Monte Carlo simulation method for Laughlin-like states in a disk geometry, O Ciftja, C Wexler, Physical Review B 67 (7), 075304 67 2003
- Equation of state and spin-correlation functions of ultrasmall classical Heisenberg magnets, O Ciftja, M Luban, M Auslender, JH Luscombe, Physical Review B 60 (14), 10122 63 1999
- Ground state of two-dimensional quantum-dot helium in zero magnetic field: Perturbation, diagonalization, and variational theory, O Ciftja, AA Kumar, Physical Review B 70 (20), 205326, 59, 2004
- Understanding electronic systems in semiconductor quantum dots, O Ciftja, Physica Scripta 88 (5), 058302 51 2013
