= Maxim Chernodub =

- Born: 7 June 1973 (age 53); Bogodukhov, Ukrainian SSR
- Education: Moscow Institute of Physics and Technology (MIPT) / Institute for Theoretical and Experimental Physics (ITEP), Moscow
- Known for: Postulation of the magnetic-field-induced superconductivity of the vacuum
- Scientific career
- Fields: High-energy physics, physics of elementary particles and fields, quark–gluon plasma, heavy-ion collisions, strong magnetic fields
- Workplaces: Laboratoire de mathématiques et physique théorique (French National Centre for Scientific Research / University of Tours; researcher); Department of Physics and Astronomy (Ghent University, Belgium; Visiting Professor)

Maxim Nikolaevich Chernodub (born June 7, 1973) is a French physicist of Ukrainian descent best known for his postulation of the magnetic-field-induced superconductivity of the vacuum.

== Career ==
=== Beginnings and degrees ===
Chernodub attended Lycée 145 in Kyiv from 1980 to 1990. He earned a bachelor's degree and a Master of Science, at the Moscow Institute of Physics and Technology, in 1993 and 1996, respectively, and a Ph.D. at the Institute for Theoretical and Experimental Physics (ITEP) in Moscow, in 1999. In 2007, there followed his habilitation at the ITEP.

=== Work as a scientist ===
Chernodub worked for the ITEP (1994–2001, 2003–2006, 2007–2008) and for the Japanese Kanazawa (2001–2003) and Hiroshima University (2006–2007). Since 2008, he holds a permanent position as a researcher for the French National Centre for Scientific Research (CNRS), at the Laboratoire de mathématiques et physique théorique of the University of Tours. He is also a visiting professor at the Department of Physics and Astronomy, Ghent University (Belgium; 2010–2012), and a referee for the Natural Sciences and Engineering Research Council of Canada, the Russian Ministry of Education and Science, and the French National Agency for Research.

== The magnetic-field-induced superconductivity of the vacuum ==
Chernodub found, on the basis of the theory of quantum chromodynamics (QCD), that charged rho mesons — charged virtual particles popping into and out of being in a vacuum — can linger long enough to become real in a magnetic field of 10^{16} tesla or more. They share the same quantum state and form a condensate, flowing together as one particle. The condensed rho mesons may carry electric current without resistance along the magnetic field lines. The internal magnetic fields of the particles align with the magnetic field around them, which causes a decrease of the total energy.

Among several unusual properties of this postulated superconductivity of the vacuum is that it would, unlike previously known superconductivity, be expected to persist at temperatures of at least a billion, perhaps billions of degrees. Chernodub sees a possible explanation of his results in the quarks and antiquarks constituting the rho mesons being forced to move only along the magnetic field lines, which would render the rho mesons far more stable. The effective mass of the rho mesons would be lowered to zero, enabling them to condense and move freely, due to an interaction of their spins with the external magnetic field. The apparently strange situation that a current should flow without a carrier is explained by the fact that a vacuum is never truly empty.

In the realm of astrophysics, Chernodub's calculations could mean that periods of vacuum-superconductivity in the early days of the universe had caused the emergence of the large-scale magnetic fields out in space, which are so far mysterious. At present, magnetic fields of 10^{16} T are by far not reached in the known universe.

=== Possible measurability at ion colliders ===
Chernodub believes that his prediction could be proven at the Large Hadron Collider (LHC) near Geneva or at the Relativistic Heavy Ion Collider (RHIC) of Brookhaven National Laboratory in Upton, New York. Ions colliding at these particle accelerators could create a magnetic field of almost the required strength in a "near miss", for perhaps one yoctosecond. Chernodub expects that vacuum superconductivity would, if it exists, leave a trace of charged rho mesons at the accelerators.
