= Domenica Garzón =

Ecuadorian female inventor

Domenica Garzon
- Born: December 11; Quito, Ecuador
- Education: Universidad Yachay Tech; University of Illinois Urbana-Champaign
- Occupations: theoretical physicist, inventor, explorer
- Awards: MIT Innovators Under 35 (2022) Best Undergraduate Researcher – Yachay Tech University; Premio Abdón Calderón; AAUW International Fellowship (2024) ICASU Fellowship – University of Illinois Urbana-Champaign (2025)

Domenica Garzon is a theoretical physicist from Ecuador. She was recognized by the MIT Technology Review as one of Latin America’s top innovators in 2022.

She is the founder of the Rikuna Center, a program that brings scientific research to underserved communities in Ecuador, and of Water-Y, a project that seeks to use innovation to address problems of water scarcity.

== Early years ==
She grew up in the city of Quito, Ecuador. She completed her primary education at Virgilio Drouet school and her secondary education at La Dolorosa Private School. Later, she moved to the province of Imbabura to continue her studies at Yachay Tech University. After a few years, she decided to move to the United States to continue her research at the University of Illinois.

== Research ==
Her research projects include astrophysics and condensed matter.

=== Astrophysics ===
She conducts her research on gravitational waves at the University of Illinois at Urbana-Champaign and the Perimeter Institute in Canada.

=== Condensed matter ===
Within this area, she has conducted research with topological defects and graphene.

Months after the April 2016 earthquake that shook much of northern Ecuador's coast, access to clean water was a recurring problem. Garzón, together with students from Yachay Tech University, invented a coating that makes this condensation process more efficient. The coating is an organic nanomaterial that increases the amount of water that can be condensed. The process ensures that the water is clean, as the condensation process is a natural purification process.

== Exploration ==
Domenica is the co-founder of the "Rikuna" center ("to observe" in the indigenous Kichwa language). An interdisciplinary project that combines research, exploration, and scientific dissemination in the less explored areas of the Ecuadorian Amazon. In the first exploration, Garzón and the members of the Rikuna project discovered the first Cretaceous reptile reported in Ecuador. This was the first time a Mosasaur has been reported in the Ecuadorian Amazon.

== Honors ==
In 2024, she became the first Ecuadorian physicist to receive the AAUW International Fellowship to pursue research in theoretical physics. That same year, she was also awarded a fellowship from the ICASU at the University of Illinois Urbana-Champaign, supporting frontier research in gravitation and cosmology.

In 2022, she was recognized by the MIT Technology Review as one of the top innovators under 35 in Latin America.

In 2022, she became the first person in history to achieve the highest grade and be recognized by the School of Physics at Yachay Tech University as summa cum laude, where she was also acknowledged as the best undergraduate researcher.

In 2019, she received a bronze medal in the global physics contest, the University Physics Competition, with her team from Ecuador being the only South American team to receive a medal that year.

In 2015, Garzón received the Abdón Calderón award from the mayor of the city of Quito for academic excellence.
