= Hideo Aoki =

Japanese theoretical physicist

- 青木 秀夫
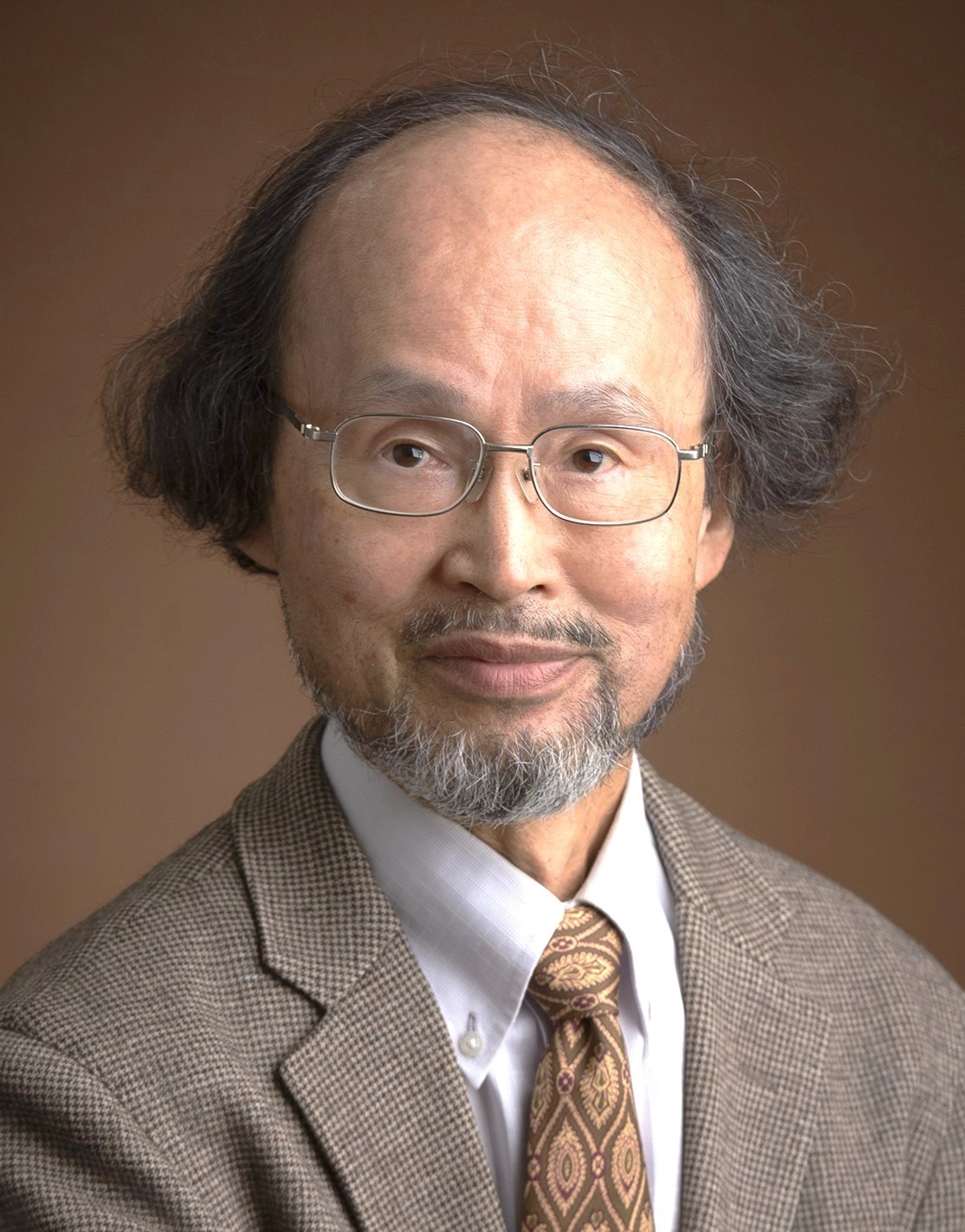
- Born: Hideo Aoki; October 1, 1950 (age 76); Tokyo
- Education: University of Tokyo (PhD)
- Known for: Cuprate and iron-based superconductivity Quantum Hall effect Flat-band superconductivity Floquet topological insulator
- Scientific career
- Fields: Physicist
- Workplaces: University of Tokyo
- Website: cms.phys.s.u-tokyo.ac.jp/index_eng.html

Hideo Aoki is a Japanese theoretical physicist. He is an emeritus professor at the University of Tokyo, Japan, and works in the field of condensed-matter physics and cold-atom physics.

== Biography ==
Hideo Aoki studied theoretical condensed-matter physics, and received his PhD in physics from the University of Tokyo in 1978, where his doctoral research was on the quantum Hall effect. He was a visiting scholar at the Cavendish Laboratory, University of Cambridge, UK in 1980-1982. He then built up his group in 1986 at the department of physics, University of Tokyo in theoretical condensed-matter physics, as a full professor from 1998.

In 2016 he retired from the University of Tokyo and became an emeritus professor, and subsequently took up a research position at National Institute of Advanced Industrial Science and Technology (AIST), Tsukuba, Japan until 2022. In 2017 he was a guest professor at ETH Zurich, Switzerland, and also a guest scientist at the Max-Planck-Institute for the Structure and Dynamics of Matter, Hamburg in Germany in 2018.

== Research ==
The theoretical works of Hideo Aoki and his group are focussed on many-body and topological effects in electron systems, namely, superconductivity, magnetism, and topological systems (including graphene). For these system he explored materials designed for correlated electron systems, and in particular non-equilibrium phenomena in recent years. He has authored or co-authored over 300 articles ranging across condensed-matter physics. He has also authored or co-edited six books:
