= Tsao Chang =

Chinese-American physicist

Tsao Chang (Chinese: 张操; born 1942 in Shanghai, China) is a Chinese-American physicist.

Chang has taught physics and conducted research on the theory of space and time for more than fifty years in China and the United States.

== Personal life ==
Tsao Chang was born in Shanghai, China, on April 22, 1942. He met his wife, Bei Lei Dong, while attending Fudan University. They were wed in September 1967 and had two children, both sons. Their eldest son, John Zhang, became a successful business man and a member of the board for several public companies. Chang’s younger son, James Zhang is founder and CEO of Concept Art House, a video game developer.

== Physics career ==
In 1965, Chang graduated from Fudan University, China with a degree in nuclear physics.

Chang has taught electrodynamics and modern physics in China and the United States. From 1980 to 1982, he was a visiting scholar in the physics department at the University of Massachusetts Amherst. He also taught in the department of physics, Shanghai University of Science and Technology from 1982–1985. From 1985–1989, Chang was a visiting professor at both Utah State University and the University of Alabama in the United States. From 1989–2002, Chang conducted research on space physics at Alabama.

Chang's research areas cover superluminal neutrinos and the theory of relativity. He has produced more than thirty research papers in addition to two books.

In an international conference "in early 1985, T. Chang predicted neutrinos may be Superluminal particles".

Since 2002, his research has centered on the theory of space and time.
