= Merritt Moore =

American ballet dancer and quantum physicist

- Born: February 24, 1988 (age 38); Los Angeles, California
- Education: Harvard University and Oxford University
- Known for: Quantum Physics and Ballet
- Parents: Schuyler Moore (father); Alice Chu-Hoon Moore (mother)
- Website: www.merrittmoore.com

Merritt Moore (born February 24, 1988) is an American ballerina and quantum physics researcher. Her artistic work incorporates science and dance through the use of robots.

== Early life ==
Merritt Moore was born in Los Angeles, California on February 24, 1988, to Alice Chu-Hoon Moore (Korean) and Schuyler Moore (American). She also has a sister. Gymnastics was the first sport Moore was involved in growing up. Later, Moore discovered a love for mathematics and dance. Moore began dancing at thirteen years of age. When she was fifteen, she traveled to Viterbo, Italy, where she met Irina Rosca, who had been a professional dancer at the National Ballet of Romania. Moore trained with Rosca during her time in Italy and, when she studied at Harvard, she joined the student-run dance group, where she was trained with professional dancers Damian Woetzel and Heather Watts.

== Career ==
Merritt Moore attended Harvard University and majored in physics. While at Harvard, she won the Michael von Clemm Fellowship, an exchange program between the universities of Harvard and Oxford open to senior students. In 2011, she graduated magna cum laude from Harvard and attended the University of Oxford from 2012 - 2017, where she earned her Ph.D. in Atomic and Laser Physics. From 2022 to 2024, she was appointed as Distinguished Artist in Residence, Adjunct Professor of Practice at the New York University at Abu Dhabi, where she taught Creative Robotics & Tech. She continues to work at the intersection of ballet and robotics, and has been advisor and performer in large events, such as the World Economic Forum.

=== Residency ===
Merritt Moore completed a residency at Harvard University's ArtLab. During this residency, she worked with robots to create a dance choreography between a human and a robot. The project involved the visual arts, film and ballet. They also used an UR10e robotic arm, which is a robot with multiple industrial applications and capabilities, such as assembling and material handling. For this project, Moore collaborated with Alice Williamson, a London-based performing artist experienced in the visual arts. Overall, the project aimed to explore "how Artificial Intelligence can inspire and broaden human creativity through the language of dance".

=== Research ===
Merritt Moore's academic research is focused on quantum computing. Her first work, published in 2013, is about using a system of qubits and CPHASE gates to try to create a more efficient quantum computing system. Her second paper, published in 2016, is about the development of a system that combines quantum computing with classical computing implemented on separate servers. In this paper, researchers tested whether measurements of light could be used to securely carry information between different servers.

=== Ballet ===
Moore started dancing professionally in 2008, while in her sophomore year at Harvard, when she was accepted at the Zurich Ballet. Later, she joined the Boston Ballet, where she starred in La Bayadère and The Nutcracker. After graduating from Harvard, Moore performed the Swan Lake and The Nutcracker with the English National Ballet. She also performed with robots with the London Contemporary Ballet Theater. Moore also practiced George Balanchine's Symphony in C at the Norwegian National Ballet.

== SASters ==
Merritt Moore started SASters, an initiative that stands for Science-Art-Sisters. The purpose of SASters is to help young girls to find an interest in STEM careers. Likewise, SASters encourages girls to incorporate both science and art into their lives. The group also brings together those pursuing science and art careers.

== Public appearances and achievements ==
Merritt Moore's career as a science educator led her to speak at TEDxOxbridge, where she talked about how she felt when she started to dance and how her perspective on dance has changed after working with quantum optics as a professional researcher. During this appearance, she performed a duet with Adam Kirkham. Moore was invited to speak in New York at the Forbes Women's Summit in New York. In March 2019, Moore spoke at the US Embassy in London for a Women in STEM panel, where she presented the importance of having more women involved in STEM fields. In 2019, she was invited to speak at the Physics Department at Princeton University, and she talked about her journey in ballet and physics and how these two areas connect.

She starred at the BBC as a contestant on their program Astronauts: Do You Have What It Takes? The show received applications and tested candidates physically and mentally, to see who would be a good candidate to become an astronaut. Merritt was selected along other twelve applicants. She mentioned that wanted to be an astronaut since childhood, when she used to identify constellations at night with her father. Moore has her own story about her life and achievements in Good Night Stories for Rebel Girls 2, written by Francesca Cavallo and Elena Favilli. This book documents 100 women who have done something incredible in their lives. Glamour Magazine featured Merritt Moore has one of their 'Top Ten College Women' competition.

She has performed ballet at unconventional venues like the Victoria and Albert Museum. In collaboration with Darren Johnson, Merritt created a virtual reality experience at the Barbican Theater in London. This work involved meditation and the concept of zero point energy, which argues that energy is everywhere, even where we least expect it to be. Moore was invited to the Imagine Film Festival in NY in 2017. She worked with Inés Vogelfang to create a film they called 'Duality'.

Merritt Moore was featured in Forbes 30 Under 30 in 2018, when she was 29 years old. Forbes 30 Under 30 recognizes people under thirty years of age that the publication deems remarkable individuals.
