= Tamitha Skov =

American space weather physicist

- Born: Tamitha Lynne Mulligan
- Education: University of California
- Scientific career
- Fields: Space Weather; Geophysics
- Workplaces: American Meteorological Society; The Aerospace Corporation; Millersville University
- Thesis: The Structure and Solar Origins of Interplanetary Coronal Mass Ejections (2002)
- Doctoral advisor: Christopher T. Russell
- Website: www.spaceweatherwoman.com

Tamitha Skov is a space weather physicist, researcher and public speaker based in Los Angeles. She is also referred to as "Space Weather Woman" in social media, where she forecasts and analyzes space weather processes - in the heliosphere and exosphere, in addition to her conducting the same in traditional media. Skov is presently serving as a research scientist at The Aerospace Corporation and as an adjunct professor of heliophysics and space weather at Millerville University. Skov holds an amateur radio operator license, callsign WX6SWW.

== Early life and career ==
Skov received bachelor degrees in physics and physical chemistry from University of California, Los Angeles in 1996. Subsequently she obtained her Masters in geophysics and planetary physics and a PhD in planetary physics and space physics from the University of California, Los Angeles in the years 2000 and 2002, respectively. From 1996 to 1999 she was a recipient of National Aeronautical and Space Administration Space Grant Fellowship. Presently she is working as the research scientist at Space Materials Laboratory, The Aerospace Corporation, where she joined in 2004. She also serves as an instructor and audio forensic analyst for National Law Enforcement and Corrections Technology Center.

== Works ==
Skov's work primarily involves observation and analysis of space weather phenomena like coronal mass ejections, solar flares, and solar particle events and the development of predictive techniques to be able to forecast future events. Her forecasting focuses on minimizing societal impacts of space weather events on the services dependent upon satellite or similar space mediated technologies, like GPS, and also on the services/systems sensitive to geomagnetic fields such as power grid systems, international space station, air traffic systems, amateur radio communications etc. While conducting these forecasts mainly on social media, Skov has also appeared on mainstream media like the History Channel, NASA Television, The Weather Channel, TWiT.tv etc discussing her forecasts and the intersection of space weather and atmospheric weather in broadcasting. Skov also has a YouTube channel. In 2021, Skov received the Technical Achievement Award from the Dayton Hamvention for her forecasting work, under her call sign WX6SWW.

== Selected publications ==
- T. Mulligan, C. T. Russell, J. G. Luhmann, Solar cycle evolution of the structure of magnetic clouds in the inner heliosphere, Geophysical Research Letters.
- T. Mulligan, C. T. Russell, Multispacecraft modeling of the flux rope structure of interplanetary coronal mass ejections: Cylindrically symmetric versus nonsymmetric topologies. Journal of Geophysical Research.
- Hecht J.H., T. Mulligan, D. J. Strickland, A. J. Kochenash, Y. Murayama, Y.-M. Tanaka, D. S. Evans, M. G. Conde, E. F. Donovan, F. J. Rich, and D. Morrison, (2008), Satellite and ground-based observations of auroral energy deposition and the effects on thermospheric composition during large geomagnetic storms: the great geomagnetic storm of 20 November 2003, J.Geophys. Res., 113.
- Skov, Tamitha, Aerospace Corporation, El Segundo, CA - Space Weather Seen through the Public Eye of Social and Broadcast Media, 2019
- Palmerio, Erika; Nitta, Nariaki V.; Mulligan, Tamitha; Mierla, Marilena; O'Kane, Jennifer; Richardson, Ian G.; Sinha, Suvadip; Srivastava, Nandita; Yardley, Stephanie L.; Zhukov, Andrei N. Investigating Remote-sensing Techniques to Reveal Stealth Coronal Mass Ejections.
- Mulligan, T., A. A. Reinard, B. J. Lynch, (2013), Advancing In Situ Modeling of ICMEs: New Techniques for New Observations, J. Geophys. Res., 118, 1410–1427.
- Nitta, N.V., Mulligan, T. Earth-Affecting Coronal Mass Ejections Without Obvious Low Coronal Signatures. Sol Phys 292, 125 (2017).
- Nitta, Nariaki; Mulligan, Tamitha, Stealthy but Geoeffective Coronal Mass Ejections.
- A. D. Marinan et al., "Assessment of Radiometer Calibration With GPS Radio Occultation for the MiRaTA CubeSat Mission," in IEEE Journal of Selected Topics in Applied Earth Observations and Remote Sensing, vol. 9, no. 12, pp. 5703-5714, Dec. 2016.
- Lee, J. H.; Walker, D.; Mann, C. J.; Yue, Y.; Nocerino, J. C.; Smith, B. S.; Mulligan, T. Characterizing the Radiation Survivability of Space Solar Cell Technologies for Heliospheric Missions.
- Nitta, Nariaki; Mulligan, Tamitha, Stealth CMEs and Stealthy Geomagnetic Storms.
- Mulligan, Tamitha, Nitta, Nariaki, Linking Stealthy Signatures of Coronal Mass Ejections at the Sun to 1 AU.
- Mulligan, T. L.; O'Brien, T. P., III; Claudepierre, S. G.; Roeder, J. L.; Green, J. C.; Fennell, J. F. Multi-Scale Structure of Solar Wind Transients Coincident with Electron Drift-Echoes
- Claudepierre, S. G.; O'Brien, T. P., III; Blake, J. B.; Fennell, J.; Looper, M. D.; Clemmons, J. H.; Roeder, J. L.; Mazur, J. E.; Mulligan, T. L. Van Allen Probes ECT/MagEIS Background Corrected Electron Flux Measurements: Methods and Initial Findings
- Lynch, B. J.; Kazachenko, M.; Li, Y.; Reinard, A.; Mulligan, T. L. Using Ionic Charge States to Investigate the Relationship Between Eruptive Flare Emission and the Heating of CME Plasma
