= Gari Clifford =

British-American physicist, biomedical engineer

Gari David Clifford
- Occupations: Physicist, Biomedical Engineer, Academic, and Researcher
- Awards: PhysioNet/Computing in Cardiology Challenge (2008, 2012, 2013, 2014); Martin Black Award, Institute of Physics (2009); Engineering World Health Design Award (2012) 'Best Innovation Leveraging Technology', Dell Social Innovation Challenge (2012); Max Harry Weil Memorial Award, The Society for Critical Care Med (2020)

Academic background
- Education: B.S., Physics & Electronics; M.Sc., Mathematical and Theoretical Physics; D.Phil., Engineering
- Alma mater: University of Exeter; University of Southampton; University of Oxford

Gari David Clifford is a British-American physicist, biomedical engineer, academic, and researcher. He is a professor in the Department of Anesthesiology and Critical Care Medicine at Johns Hopkins University School of Medicine and the inaugural Director of Perioperative and Critical Care Data Science & AI. He was previously the chair of the Department of Biomedical Informatics and a professor of biomedical engineering and biomedical informatics at Emory University and Georgia Institute of Technology.

Clifford has authored over 500 publications, and has multiple patents awarded. His research is focused on the development of AI and signal processing methods for processing biomedical sensor data, with application areas that include Cardiovascular Disease, Circadian Rhythms and Sleep, Global Health, Maternal/Fetal Health, and Neuropsychiatric Diseases.

Clifford is the director of the PhysioNet Challenges and the co-founder and CTO of MindChild Medical Inc. He has served on multiple advisory boards, including Alivecor Inc., Nextsense Inc., and the Research Resource for Complex Physiologic Signals (otherwise known as 'PhysioNet').

As of September 2025, Clifford's H-index is over 80. He is recognized as a top 0.05% scholar worldwide by ScholarGPS.

== Education ==
Clifford studied at the University of Exeter and received his bachelor's degree in Physics and Electronics in 1992. He then earned a master's degree in Theoretical Physics from the University of Southampton in 1995 and his Doctoral degree in Biomedical Engineering from the University of Oxford in 2003. He was supervised by Professor Sir John Roy Sambles at Exeter, and Professor Lord Lionel Tarassenko at Oxford.

== Career ==
Following his doctoral degree, he joined Massachusetts Institute of Technology as a postdoctoral fellow in 2003, then research scientist in 2004, and principal research scientist from 2005 to 2009. He was also appointed as a lecturer in medicine at Harvard University from 2007 to 2009. From 2009 to 2014, he was appointed as an associate professor of biomedical engineering at the University of Oxford, and subsequently as a visiting professor from 2014 to 2017. He held concurrent appointments as associate professor of biomedical informatics at Emory University, and as associate professor of biomedical engineering at Georgia Institute of Technology from 2014 till 2019. From 2019 to 2026, he served as professor of biomedical informatics and biomedical engineering at Emory University and Georgia Institute of Technology.

At Emory University, he was appointed as interim chair in 2016 and then as chair of the Department of Biomedical Informatics from 2019 to 2026.

In September 2026, Clifford joined Johns Hopkins University as a professor in the Department of Anesthesiology and Critical Care Medicine, with a dual appointment in the Department of Biomedical Engineering, and became the inaugural Director of Perioperative and Critical Care Data Science & AI.

At the Massachusetts Institute for Technology, Clifford served as the engineering manager for the Laboratory for Computational Physiology, under the leadership of Professor Roger G. Mark. His role included managing the collection and dissemination of the MIMIC II database. At the University of Oxford, he was the director of the Center for Healthcare Innovation, the founding director of the Center for Affordable Healthcare, and the acting director for Affordable Health technologies at the George Centre for Healthcare Innovation. At Emory University, he was appointed as interim chair in 2016 and then as Chair of the Department of Biomedical Informatics in 2019. Additionally, he holds adjunct professorships at the Cardiovascular Research Institute, Morehouse School of Medicine, and the Department of Computer Science at Emory University.

In 2025, Clifford was elected to the College of Fellows of the American Institute for Medical and Biological Engineering for his work in computational medicine and biomedical signal processing.

== Research ==
Clifford's research focuses on four main themes.

=== Healthcare Technology in Low-resource Settings ===
Clifford has worked on scalable and affordable healthcare in low-resource settings, focused on addressing healthcare issues in the poorest populations. Most notably, he and his research team developed a novel method of identifying intrauterine growth restriction and gestational age estimation using a low-cost Doppler. In collaboration with Rachel Hall-Clifford and the Maya Health Alliance/Wuku' Kawoq, the team has developed a co-design program to deploy this AI-driven mHealth technology to improve outcomes in pregnancy and early childhood in Guatemala. This effort includes the Safe+Natal program, supported by the National Institutes of Health (NIH) and Google.org, aimed at improving maternal and child health using AI. While on faculty at the University of Oxford, he founded the Oxford Centre for Affordable Healthcare, in which he, along with his research team and collaborators, developed an award-winning $5 mHealth blood pressure device, a mobile stethoscope used in South Africa, a cardiovascular disease screening system used in a clinical trial in India, and a smart hand-pump system for East Africa.

=== The George B. Moody PhysioNet Challenges ===
Clifford is most well-known for his multi-decade contributions to the NIH-funded Research Resource for Complex Physiological Signals (known as PhysioNet) and his leadership of the associated George B. Moody PhysioNet Challenges (formerly Computing in Cardiology/PhysioNet Challenges) since 2015, a series of annual international competitions that began in 2000. In 2020 the PhysioNet Challenges were awarded the inaugural DataWorks! Distinguished Achievement Award for Data Reuse from the Federation of Societies for Experimental Biology (FASEB) and the NIH Office of Data Science Strategy.

=== Computational Cardiology ===
During his doctoral work at the University of Oxford, Clifford, along with co-author Patrick McSharry, introduced a dynamical model based on three coupled ordinary differential equations capable of generating realistic synthetic electrocardiogram (ECG) signals. This work has been cited over 1500 times and led to applications ranging from modeling of arrhythmias, circadian rhythms, blood pressure, pulse oximetry, and boosting AI learning. Later, while at MIT, Clifford collaborated with Christian Jutten and Reza Sameni to develop a novel approach to recording and extracting fetal ECG. This work was licensed and spun out into a startup, MindChild Medical Inc. Clifford and collaborators subsequently demonstrated that their approach was the first non-invasive approach for the extraction of key clinical parameters (QT intervals and ST-levels) from the fetus using surface ECG.

=== Digital Mental Health and Computational Neuro-psychiatry ===
While on faculty at the University of Oxford, Clifford established a program in Computational Neuro-psychiatry, funded by the UK's Engineering and Physical Sciences Research Council, and the Wellcome Trust, to use passive data collected from mobile phones, and active data from body worn sensors to assess mental health status in schizophrenic and bipolar disorder patients. Later, he extended this program to use passive eye-tracking and emotion analysis from video to evaluate depression, mild cognitive impairment, and Post-Traumatic Stress Disorder.

== Awards and honors ==
- 2009 - Martin Black Award, Institute of Physics
- 2010 - Mobile Health Industry Summit Challenge winner; 'best R&D project' (mStethoscope)
- 2010 - mHealth Alliance Award and Vodafone Wireless Challenge (for SanaMobile)
- 2011 - 1st Prize, International Engineering World Health Design Competition
- 2012 - 'Best Innovation Leveraging Technology', Dell Social Innovation Challenge
- 2014 - 1st Prize, PhysioNet / Computing in Cardiology Challenge (Phase III)
- 2015 - Distinguished guest professor, Tsinghua University, Beijing
- 2017 - Elected to the Fulbright Specialist Roster
- 2019 - Outstanding Achievement in Research Program Development, Georgia Institute of Technology
- 2020 - Max Harry Weil Memorial Award, The Society for Critical Care Med
- 2022: NIH DataWorks! Distinguished Achievement Award for Data Reuse (for the George B. Moody PhysioNet Challenges)
- 2023: Elected Fellow of the Asia-Pacific Artificial Intelligence Association
- 2023 - Fellowship of the IEEE "for contributions to machine-learning applications in cardiovascular time series"
- 2025: Selected as the 2025 Dean's Eminent Investigator
- 2025: Elected as the Dean's Eminent Investigator and Distinguished Professor, Emory School of Medicine

== Bibliography ==
- McSharry, P. E., Clifford, G. D., Tarassenko, L., & Smith, L. A. (2003). A dynamical model for generating synthetic electrocardiogram signals. IEEE transactions on biomedical engineering, 50(3), 289–294.
- Clifford, G. D., Azuaje, F., & McSharry, P. (2006). Advanced methods and tools for ECG data analysis (p. 12). Boston: Artech house.
- Saeed, M., Villarroel, M., Reisner, A. T., Clifford, G., Lehman, L. W., Moody, G., ... & Mark, R. G. (2011). Multiparameter Intelligent Monitoring in Intensive Care II (MIMIC-II): a public-access intensive care unit database. Critical care medicine, 39(5), 952.
- Sameni, R., Shamsollahi, M. B., Jutten, C., & Clifford, G. D. (2007). A nonlinear Bayesian filtering framework for ECG denoising. IEEE Transactions on Biomedical Engineering, 54(12), 2172–2185.
- Li, Q., Mark, R. G., & Clifford, G. D. (2008). Robust heart rate estimation from multiple asynchronous noisy sources using signal quality indices and a Kalman filter. Physiological Measurement, 29(1), 15–32. https://doi.org/10.1088/0967-3334/29/1/002
- , R., & Clifford, G. D. (2010). A review of fetal ECG signal processing; issues and promising directions. The open pacing, electrophysiology & therapy journal, 3, 4.
- Liu, C., Springer, D., Li, Q., Moody, B., Juan, R. A., Chorro, F. J., Castells, F., Roig, J. M., Silva, I., Johnson, A. E. W., Syed, Z., Schmidt, S. E., Papadaniil, C. D., Hadjileontiadis, L., Naseri, H., Moukadem, A., Dieterlen, A., Brandt, C., Tang, H., Samieinasab, M., ... Clifford, G. D. (2016). An open access database for the evaluation of heart sound algorithms. Physiological Measurement, 37(12), 2181–2213. https://doi.org/10.1088/0967-3334/37/12/2181
