= Leonard Strachan =

American astrophysicist

- Education: Massachusetts Institute of Technology, 1982; Harvard University, 1990
- Awards: NASA Group Achievement Award for Spartan 201
- Scientific career
- Fields: Astrophysics, Solar Physics
- Workplaces: United States Naval Research Laboratory, Center for Astrophysics | Harvard & Smithsonian
- Thesis: Measurement of outflow velocities in the solar corona (1990)
- Doctoral advisor: John L. Kohl

Leonard Strachan is an astrophysicist who works on instrumentation to study the Sun's corona and solar wind. He currently works at the United States Naval Research Laboratory where he is the principal investigator for the Ultraviolet Spectro-Coronagraph (UVSC) Pathfinder, and serves on the National Academy of Sciences Committee on Solar and Space Physics.
