= Rachel Takserman-Krozer =

Theoretical physicist

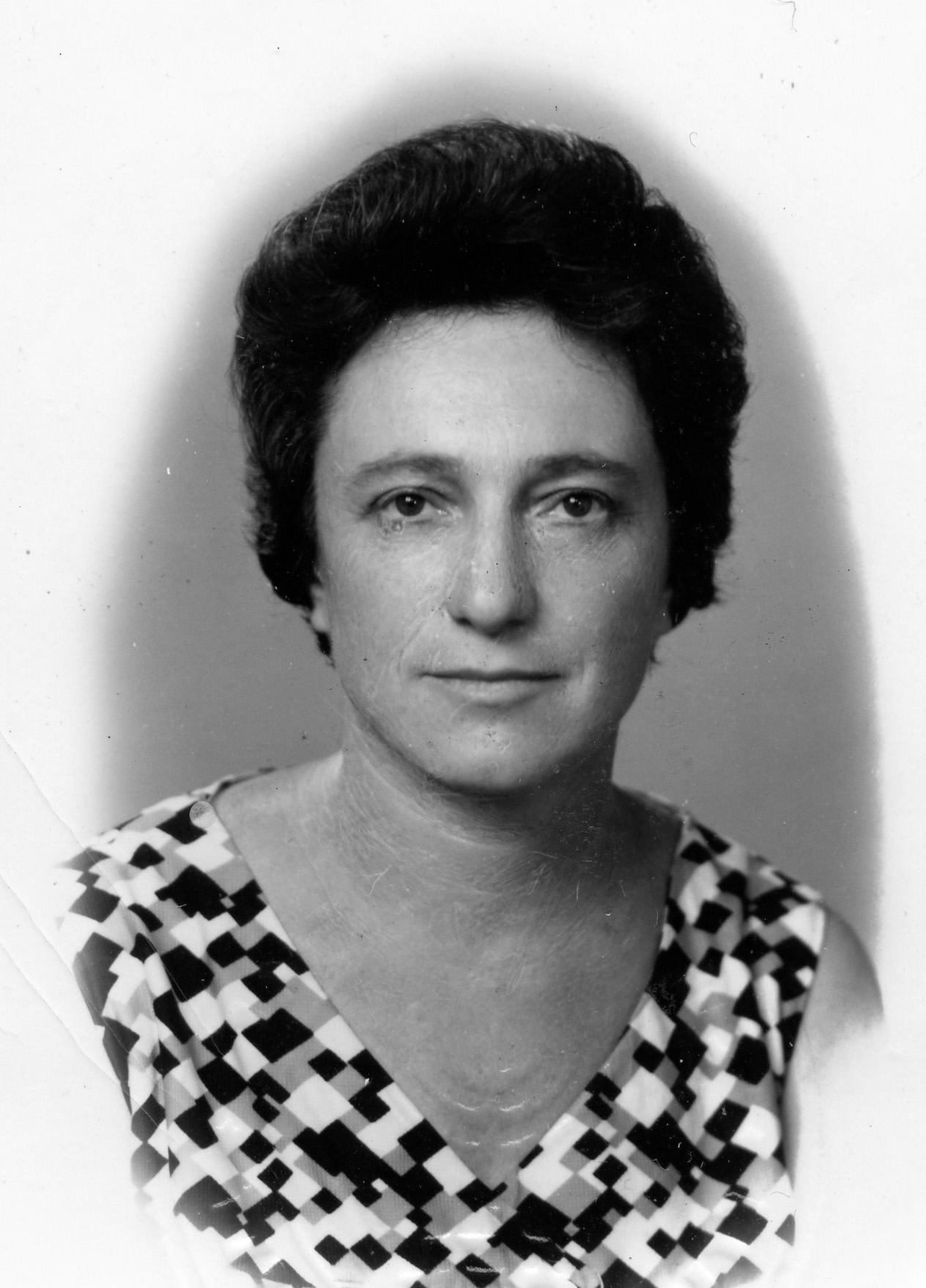
- Born: Rachel Takserman; 31 December 1921; Haisyn, Ukrainian SSR
- Died: 27 September 1987 (aged 65); Trier, Germany
- Citizenship: German
- Education: Central Asian State University, Tashkent, Uzbekistan, Polish Academy of Sciences (Ph.D.); Polish Academy of Sciences (Habilitation)
- Known for: Polymer flow Rheology Polymers in velocity fields Spinnabililtys Molecular statistical theory Statistical theory of polymer solutions Viscoelastic materials Nonlinear Rheology Microrheology Equilibrium polymer network theory Non-equilibrium polymer network theory
- Spouse: Szymon Krozer (m. 1946–1987)
- Children: Anatol Krozer; Yoram Krozer; Viktor Krozer
- Awards: Polish Chemical Society Scientific Award (1963)
- Scientific career
- Fields: Theoretical physics
- Workplaces: V. A. Fock Institute, St. Petersburg State University; Polish Academy of Sciences; Israel Institute of Technology; University of Stuttgart
- Thesis: XXX (1962)
- Doctoral advisor: Andrzej Ziabicki

Rachel "Raya" Takserman-Krozer (31 December 1921 – 28 September 1987) was a theoretical physicist and professor of rheology. Takserman-Krozer worked on diverse aspects of theoretical physics ranging from theory of relativity to studies of polymers and their flow. Her scientific work includes contributions to behaviour of polymers and polymers solutions in velocity fields, theory of spinnability, problems of phenomenological rheology, and molecular-statistical theory of polymer networks. Takserman-Krozer worked across several countries including Russia, Poland, Israel, and Germany.

She received the Polish Chemical Society Scientific Award in 1963, and was listed in Who's who in Israel 1972 and the International Register of Profiles of the International Biographical Centre

== Biography ==
Rachel (Raya) Takserman-Krozer was born on 31 December 1921 in Haisyn, Ukrainian SSR into a Jewish family. After moving to Odesa, Takserman-Krozer finished her school education and was admitted to the Faculty of Physics at the University of Odessa. During the Second World War she volunteered as a nurse and continued her study of physics at the university of Tashkent, Uzbekistan, where she obtained an MSc degree in Theoretical Physics in 1945. She married Szymon (Simon) Krozer in 1946, who studied experimental physics at the university of Tashkent and later became professor of experimental polymer physics. In 1948 she started her doctoral studies on theory of relativity with V. A. Fock at the Institute of Theoretical Physics in Leningrad University now St. Petersburg State University. During this time she lectured at the Petrozavodsk State University. During this time she gave birth to three sons: Anatol Krozer in 1949, who became a surface science physicist focusing on development of bio- and chemical sensors at ACREO, Research Institutes of Sweden (RISE), Gothenburg, Sweden, Georgij (Yoram) Krozer in 1953, who studied biology and economics and works as an associated professor on innovations for sustainable development at the University of Twente, Netherlands, and Viktor Krozer in 1958, who studied electrical engineering and is now professor of Terahertz Photonics and Electronics at faculty of physics at the Goethe University Frankfurt, Germany.

In 1959 she resumed her PhD studies at the Laboratory of Polymer Physics of the Industrial Chemistry Institute, headed by Andrzej Ziabicki. She completed her PhD (Warsaw, 1962) and habilitation (Łódź, 1966), both in polymer physics. In 1967 and 1968 she worked in the Institute of Fundamental Technological Research, Polish Academy of Sciences, Warsaw, Poland on hydrodynamics and rheology of polymer solutions and suspensions, "spinnability of liquids", extensional flows and problems related to the theory of polymer processing.

In August 1968 she obtained a position as a professor at the Department of Mechanics at the Israel Institute of Technology (Technion) headed, at that time, by Marcus Reiner, the founder of Rheology, where she worked on the subjects of Microrheology and Nonlinear Rheology.

In 1972, she continued her research at the RWTH Aachen University, University of Karlsruhe and finally at the University of Stuttgart, working together with Ekkehart Kröner. She deceased in Trier, Germany, after three years of fight against lung cancer, on 28 September 1987. According to her last wish, she had been entombed in Amsterdam, Netherlands.

== Scientific work ==
Taksmeran-Krozer's main contributions are in the field of Polymer Physics and Rheology. She has made substantial contributions to the field of rheology together with Marcus Reiner and to the field of behaviour of polymer solutions and networks. Her research work has been published predominantly in the Journal of Polymer Science, the Bulletin de L’Académie Polonaise des Sciences, Rheologica Acta, and Colloid and Polymer Science.

=== Behaviour of polymer solutions in velocity fields ===
Takserman-Krozer focused on various problems related to polymer processing - structure development, rheology, relation between structure and physical properties, contributing to the understanding of elongational (extensional) flow of polymer suspensions and solutions. Her solution of the ellipsoid orientation distribution in form of series expansion was later supplemented by an exact solution of a similar problem (orientation in shear flow) by Werner Kuhn. Then Takserman-Krozer and Andrzej Ziabicki made a systematic study of elongational flow behaviour of various molecular models and rheological behaviour of polymers.

=== Theory of spinnability ===
Spinnability of liquids was another problem related to fibre spinning studied in parallel with hydrodynamics and rheology of polymer solutions and suspensions. Takserman-Krozer and Andrzej Ziabicki found factors limiting spinnability, i.e. the maximum length of liquid threads, to obey two mechanisms: development of Rayleigh capillary waves on the surface of liquid threads and their break-up into drops, and brittle fracture of viscoelastic threads when the accumulated elastic energy compensates cohesive forces. Direct observations of capillary break-up and cohesive fracture also spoke in favour of the proposed theory. In spite of later efforts by Takserman-Krozer and coworkers the theory of spinnability never reached the level of a quantitative theory.

=== Phenomenological rheology ===
Takserman Krozer investigated basic problems of phenomenological (classical) rheology and closure of the gap between the micro structure of the materials and their macro mechanical behaviour. In her work with Marcus Reiner, the phenomenological rheology approach of a combination of linear bodies was used for the analysis of the dynamic strength limit of both viscoelastic solid and elastic-viscous liquid. The general formulation of the problem characterizes the rheological stress/strain relationship of a general compressible fluid, the basic hydrodynamic equations of continuity, motion and energy transfer, and the dependence of the rheological and physical parameters of the material on its thermodynamic state.

A perturbation solution for pressure- and temperature-dependent viscosity has shown that pressure and heating effects may result in apparently non-Newtonian behaviour, with a non-uniform pressure gradient and variable velocity profile along the pipe.

=== Molecular-statistical theory of polymer networks ===
Takserman-Krozer established the dynamical theory of macromolecular (permanent) networks at the Institute of Theoretical and Applied Physics of the University of Stuttgart with Ekkehart Kröner. The Hartree self-consistent field approach as a method to take into account many-body forces such as Oseen's hydrodynamic interaction had been considered. She then, together with Ekkehart Kröner, developed the thermodynamics as well as the molecular-statistical theory of so-called temporary polymer networks, both for equilibrium and nonequilibrium. The theory now stands quantitatively. Properties investigated were in particular the non-Newtonian fluid flow for shear and elongation flow and the stress overshoot maximum after abrupt start of the flow.

== Honours and prizes ==
In 1963, Takserman-Krozer received the Polish Chemical Society Scientific Award. She is listed in the Who's Who in Israel 1972 and in International Register of Profiles of the International Biographical Centre.
