= Julianne Pollard-Larkin =

American medical physicist

- Born: Augusta, Georgia
- Education: University of Miami; UCLA
- Scientific career
- Fields: Medical physics
- Workplaces: University of Texas; MD Anderson Cancer Center

Julianne Pollard-Larkin is an American medical physicist, professor at MD Anderson Cancer Center in Houston, TX and is also the Physics Service Chief for the Thoracic service of MD Anderson's Division of Radiation Oncology. She is also the chair of the American Association of Physicists in Medicine (AAPM) Equity, Diversity and Inclusion Committee.

== Biography and education ==
Pollard-Larkin grew up in Miami, Florida, as the daughter of a schoolteacher and an Army Lieutenant Colonel. Even as a child she was interested in science, and at age eleven she developed an interest in space after seeing a picture of NASA astronaut Mae Jemison on the cover of a magazine. She double majored in Physics and Mathematics at the University of Miami where she received her Bachelor of Science. Towards the end of her undergraduate degree her mother was diagnosed with breast cancer. Through accompanying her mother to radiation therapy, Pollard-Larkin met a medical physicist and learned about the existence of that field. Subsequently, she attended the University of California, Los Angeles where she was the first African American woman to earn her PhD in Biomedical Physics at UCLA. During her PhD, her research focused on evaluating radiomodulatory agents on cell lines derived from patients with the rare radiosensitive genetic disorder Ataxia-Telangiectasia.

== Career ==
After graduating from UCLA in 2008, Pollard-Larkin began her clinical residency in medical physics at the University of Texas MD Anderson Cancer Center in Houston, Texas. In 2010, she became an instructor in the Department of Radiation Physics in the Division of Radiation Oncology at the MD Anderson Cancer Center, subsequently becoming an assistant professor there in 2012. In 2011, she was certified by the American Board of Radiology. In 2019, she was promoted to associate professor. Recently, in 2025, Dr. Pollard-Larkin was promoted to full professor. As a clinical medical physicist, she dedicates the bulk of her work on clinical research focused on motion management for lung patients, neutron measurements for implanted electronic devices and patient communication for radiation oncology patients. She is also a fierce advocate for encouraging students to pursue careers in physics and STEM.

== Personal life ==
Pollard-Larkin lives in Houston, Texas. She is married and a mother of 2 children.
