= Zongfu Yu =

Academic background
- Education: B.S., Physics; M.S., Management Science; PhD., Applied Physics
- Alma mater: University of Science and Technology of China; Stanford University

Academic work
- Institutions: University of Wisconsin–Madison

Zongfu Yu is an American physicist and an academic. He is a professor in the Department of Electrical and Computer Engineering at the University of Wisconsin-Madison.

Yu is most known for his work on nonreciprocal optics, solar cells, and machine learning, with his research published in academic journals such as Science and Nature.

== Education ==
Yu completed his B.S. in Physics from the University of Science and Technology of China in 2004. Later, he earned an M.S. in Management Science and Engineering from Stanford University in 2008 and a PhD in Applied Physics from Stanford University in 2009.

== Career ==
Yu began his academic career as a postdoctoral scholar at Stanford University from 2009 to 2012. In 2013, he joined the department of electrical and computer engineering at the University of Wisconsin – Madison. In 2015, he co-founded Flexcompute to develop GPU-based physics simulations.

== Research ==
Yu has authored research papers on a range of topics, including optics and photonics, computational electrodynamics, and the application of machine learning in physics simulation. He is a Highly Cited Researcher by Clarivate, ranked in the top 1% by citations for his field(s) and publication year in the Web of Science.

== Awards and honors ==
- 2017 – Young Faculty Award, Defense Advanced Research Projects Agency
- 2018 – CAREER Award, National Science Foundation
- 2020 – Fellow, The Optical Society
- 2021 – H.I. Romnes Faculty Fellowship, University of Wisconsin–Madison

== Selected articles ==
- Kinkhabwala, A., Yu, Z., Fan, S., Avlasevich, Y., Müllen, K., & Moerner, W. E. (2009). Large single-molecule fluorescence enhancements produced by a bowtie nanoantenna. Nature Photonics, 3(11), 654–657.
- Zhu, J., Yu, Z., Burkhard, G. F., Hsu, C. M., Connor, S. T., Xu, Y., ... & Cui, Y. (2009). Optical absorption enhancement in amorphous silicon nanowire and nanocone arrays. Nano Letters, 9(1), 279–282.
- Yu, Z., & Fan, S. (2009). Complete optical isolation created by indirect interband photonic transitions. Nature Photonics, 3(2), 91–94.
- Fang, K., Yu, Z., & Fan, S. (2012). Realizing effective magnetic field for photons by controlling the phase of dynamic modulation. Nature Photonics, 6(11), 782–787.
- Zhou, L., Tan, Y., Ji, D., Zhu, B., Zhang, P., Xu, J., ... & Zhu, J. (2016). Self-assembly of highly efficient, broadband plasmonic absorbers for solar steam generation. Science Advances, 2(4), e1501227.
