= Lindsay LeBlanc =

Canadian atomic physicist and engineer

Lindsay J. LeBlanc
- Education: University of Alberta; University of Toronto
- Scientific career
- Fields: Quantum gas physics
- Workplaces: University of Alberta (2013–)
- Thesis: Exploring many-body physics with ultracold atoms
- Website: sites.google.com/ualberta.ca/ultracold/home

Lindsay J. LeBlanc is a Canadian atomic physicist. She is an associate professor of physics at University of Alberta and the Tier 2 Canada Research Chair for Quantum Simulation with Ultracold Quantum Gases. Her work involves quantum simulation, quantum memory, and developing hybrid quantum systems.

== Background and education ==
LeBlanc completed a BSc in engineering physics at University of Alberta. She earned a MSc and PhD in physics at University of Toronto researching ferromagnetism in ultracold Fermi gas winning the 2011 CAP Division of Atomic, Molecular and Optical Physics Canada (DAMOPC) Thesis Prize for her PhD thesis on “Exploring many-body physics with ultracold atoms”. She conducted a postdoctoral fellowship at the Joint Quantum Institute of National Institute of Standards and Technology and University of Maryland, College Park.

LeBlanc is an associate professor of physics at University of Alberta (U of A) and the Tier 2 Canada Research Chair for Quantum Simulation with Ultracold Quantum Gases. She is part of the multidisciplinary QUANTA (QUantum Nanotechnology Training in Alberta) CREATE program team which trains graduate students in emerging quantum technologies. She was also a fellow of Canadian Institute for Advanced Research (CIFAR)'s quantum materials program.

== Research ==
At the U of A, LeBlanc started a research group and leads quantum simulation experiments and explores atomic quantum memory and hybrid quantum technologies. She has led development of new techniques to build quantum memories using ultracold rubidium atoms to store pulses of light encoding quantum information. She also studies hybridization of solid state devices in ultracold gasses and aims to extend quantum correlations between systems. LeBlanc's research may lead to the engineering of more energy-efficient electronic devices that use many-body behaviour.
