= Georges Zissis =

Greek physicist

Georges Zissis (born 1964) is a Greek physicist.

== Biography ==
Zissis was born in Athens in 1964 and by 1986 had graduated from the University of Crete in general Physics. He obtained master's and Ph.D. degrees on Plasma Physics from the University of Toulouse III - Paul Sabatier in 1987 and 1990 respectively and then became a full professor there; in 2011 he awarded the "Professor Honoris Causa" honorary degree from Physics Department of Saint Petersburg State University. In December 2006 he won the 1st Award of the Centenary Challenge of the International Electrotechnical Commission and in 2009 became a recipient of the Energy Globe Award and Fresnel Medal from the French Illuminating Engineering Society. His primary area of work is in the field of Light Sources Science and Technology. He is especially interested in the physics of electrical discharges used as light sources; system and metrology issues for solid-state lighting systems; normalization and quality issues for light sources; impact of lighting to energy, environment, quality of life, health and security; interaction between light source and associated power supply; illumination and lighting.
