= Mar Gómez =

Spanish science communicator

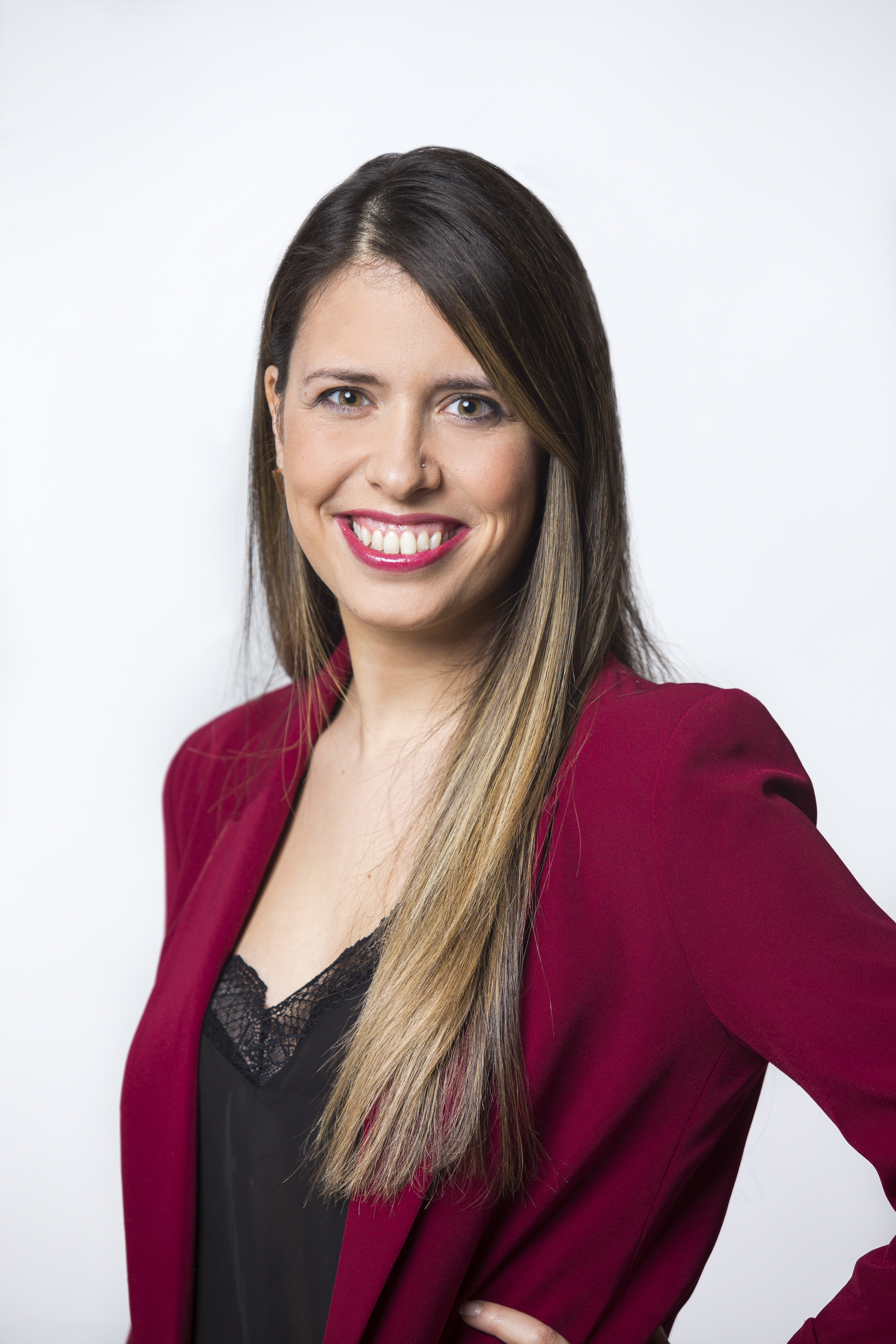
Mar Gómez

María del Mar Gómez Hernández (born in 1985) is a Spanish physicist, science communicator and popular science books author. She obtained her PhD cum laude at the Complutense University of Madrid with the thesis Análisis de las fuentes de humedad en la cuenca mediterránea en el período 1980–2000. She is a specialist in the fields of meteorology and renewable energies. She has contributed to National Geographic. In her work, she often talks about the climate change in the Arctic and its consequences (including sea level rise). She is a member of United Nations' program Verified for Climate, which focuses on combating false information about climate change on social media. Since 2014 she has worked at www.eltiempo.es as a meteorologist.

At an international level, she has been a speaker at TEDx talks and climate change awareness events. She is also known for being a popular science communicator on social media. Her work on environmental awareness, scientific communication and outreach has led her to be interviewed on numerous occasions.

== Recognition ==
In 2024, she was awarded the I Premio Biotopías for her work on science communication.

== Popular science books ==
- En qué se parecen las gotas de lluvia al pan de hamburguesa: 120 curiosidades científicas relacionadas con la meteorología (2021, in Spanish) ISBN 978-8427047471 (How raindrops resemble hamburger buns: 120 scientific curiosities related to meteorology)
- Meteorosensibles: Cómo el tiempo influye en nuestra salud física y mental (2023, in Spanish) ISBN 978-8411001281 (Weather-sensitive: How the weather influences our physical and mental health)
- Gota a gota: El gran viaje del agua (2024, in Spanish) ISBN 978-8418735462 (Drop by drop: The great journey of water)
- El tictac climático: La transformación del planeta y el destino que nos espera (2026, in Spanish) ISBN 979-1387775049 (The climate ticking: The transformation of the planet and the destiny that awaits us)
- Curiosonautas: El planeta Tierra y sus fenómenos (2026, in Spanish) ISBN 978-8491225539 (Curiousnauts: The Planet Earth and its phenomena)
- Curiosonautas: El Universo y sus secretos (2026, in Spanish) ISBN 978-8491226000 (Curiousnauts: The Universe and its secrets)

== See also ==
- Climate communication
- Climate emergency
