= Willibald Peter Prasthofer =

Willibald Peter Prasthofer (17 May 1917 – 30 July 1993) was an Austrian rocket scientist and educator.

With the anschluss of Austria with Germany prior to the second world war, he was conscripted to Peenemünde to work on the fledgeling rocket program headed by Wernher von Braun.

After the war, he worked for the French government missile program in Vernon, Eure (1947-1955), as well as participating in missile testing in Saharan Africa. After returning to Graz, Austria to teach, he was recruited by the U.S. Army to rejoin the German rocket team in Huntsville, Alabama, and with the formation of NASA, worked for the space agency on systems design and rocket propulsion and guidance. He also served as U.S. representative to the Paris air show.

Following his retirement from NASA in 1983, he taught engineering at the University of Alabama in Huntsville until his retirement in 1992. He continued to serve as lecturer at the Space Camp at the U.S. Space and Rocket center in Huntsville until his death.
