= Oriol Valls =

Oriol Tomas Valls (born 1947 in Barcelona, Spain) is a physics professor at the University of Minnesota. After obtaining his BSc in Physics at the University of Barcelona he earned a PhD at Brown University, in 1976. After a postdoctoral position at the University of Chicago he held a Miller Fellowship at the University of California Berkeley before joining the University of Minnesota faculty. He specializes in Condensed Matter Theory. He is an American Physical Society fellow since 1998 and has won the APS Outstanding Referee Award. From 2016 he has also been the Editor of the Newsletter published by the Forum of Physics and Society of the American Physical Society
