= List of University of Chicago Laboratory Schools people =

This is a list of notable people who attended, taught at, or were otherwise affiliated with the University of Chicago Laboratory Schools.

== Alumni ==
Name	Year	Notability	Reference
Benjamin Abella	1988	physician, emergency medicine practitioner	
Ray Anderson	1969	Jazz trombonist, composer, bandleader, artist-in-residence at Stony Brook University	
Robert Orville Anderson	1935	American businessman and philanthropist who founded Atlantic Richfield Oil Co.	
W. Kamau Bell	1990	Stand-up comic and television host	
Rishi Bhat	2002	Former child actor, starred in The Indian in the Cupboard; internet entrepreneur	
Charles Bidwell	1946	Professor Emeritus of Sociology, University of Chicago	
David Bloom	1962	Jazz musician and instructor	
Chesa Boudin	1999	San Francisco district attorney	
Bill Bradbury	1967	Oregon Secretary of State	
Torrey C. Brown	1957	Maryland Secretary of Natural Resources	
Paul Butterfield	1960	Blues musician and bandleader	
Erwin Chemerinsky	1971	Law professor at Duke University; dean of the law school at University of California, Irvine; dean of UC Berkeley School of Law	
Joyce Chiang	1988	Murder victim, INS attorney	
Daniel Clowes	1979	Author, screenwriter, and cartoonist of alternative comic books	
Selma Jeanne Cohen	1939	Dance historian and dance critic for The New York Times	
Bill Bradbury	1967	Oregon Secretary of State	
Barbara Flynn Currie	1958	Former member of the Illinois House of Representatives	
Carol Kreeger Davidson	1945	Sculptor	
Arne Duncan	1982	Chicago Public Schools CEO, US Secretary of Education	
Elizabeth Fama	1981	Children's author	
Castle Freeman, Jr.	1962	Author, contributor to The Old Farmer's Almanac	
David D. Friedman	1961	Economist, physicist, legal scholar and libertarian theorist	
Peter Fritzsche	1977	Historian, University of Illinois Urbana-Champaign	
Aaron Gerow	1982	Professor of Film, Yale University	
Andrea Ghez	1983	Astrophysicist, MacArthur Foundation Fellow (2008), Nobel Prize winner (2020)	
Langdon Gilkey	1936	Professor of Theology and comparative religions, University of Chicago	
Leslie Hairston	1979	Chicago alderman	
Matthew Headrick	1990	1990 winner of the Intel/Westinghouse Science Talent Search	
Hal Higdon	1947	Writer and runner, longtime contributor to Runner's World	
Maria Hinojosa	1979	Pulitzer Prize-winning journalist, radio host, producer	
Ralph Hruban	1977	Pathologist at Johns Hopkins School of Medicine	
Zeke Upshaw	2009	Professional Basketball player for Grand Rapids Drive	
Valerie Jarrett	(attended)	Senior advisor to United States President Barack Obama	
Denise Jefferson	1947	Dance educator, former director of Alvin Ailey American Dance Theater	
Margo Jefferson	1964	Pulitzer Prize-winning author, former theater critic at the New York Times, professor at Columbia University and Eugene Lang College The New School for Liberal Arts	
Nancy Johnson	1951	Connecticut congresswoman (1983–2006)	
Lucy Kaplansky	1978	Folk singer and songwriter	
Leon Kass	1954	Professor at the Committee on Social Thought at the University of Chicago	
Sam Kass	1998	President Barack Obama's Senior Policy Advisor for Nutrition Policy and Let's Move! Executive Director	
Leo Katz	1974	Law professor at the University of Pennsylvania Law School	
Robert Keohane	1958	Political scientist	
Zach Kleiman	2006	NBA executive	
Shahar Kober	(attended)	Illustrator	
Lily Koppel	1999	Journalist and writer	
Sherry Lansing	1962	Former chief of Paramount Studios and Academy Award winner (2007)	
David F. Levi		Judge and dean, Duke University Law School	
Edward H. Levi	1928	President of the University of Chicago, United States Attorney General	
John G. Levi	1965	Chairperson of Legal Services Corporation	
George Lewis	1969	Trombonist, composer, author, Columbia University professor, MacArthur Foundation Fellow (2002), AACM member	
Wendell Lim	1983	Professor of Cellular and Molecular Pharmacology at University of California, San Francisco	
W. Ian Lipkin	1970	Infectious disease epidemiologist at Columbia University	
Richard A. Loeb	1919	Murderer of Bobby Franks (along with Nathan Leopold)	
Emily Mann	1970	Playwright; artistic director of McCarter Theater	
Lynn Margulis	1952	Biologist, University of Massachusetts Amherst	
William Hardy McNeill	1934	Professor emeritus, University of Chicago History Department, National Humanities Medal winner	
Daniel Meltzer	1968	Principal Deputy White House Counsel to the U.S. President; Professor, Harvard Law School	
David O. Meltzer	1982	Professor of Medicine, University of Chicago	
Diane E. Meier	1969	Geriatrician, director of the Center to Advance Palliative Care (CAPC), MacArthur Foundation Fellow (2008)	
Muffie Meyer	1972	Peabody Award and Emmy Award-winning documentary filmmaker	
Clark Blanchard Millikan		Aeronautical engineer	
Elliot Mincberg	1970	Chief Counsel for Oversight and Investigations, U.S. House Judiciary Committee; director and lawyer at People for the American Way	
Graham Moore	1999	Academy Award-winning screenwriter and author	
Bill Morrison	1983	Director and artist	
Stephanie Neely	1983	Treasurer of the City of Chicago	
Paul Nitze	1923	Public servant, winner of Presidential Medal of Freedom, namesake of Paul H. Nitze School of Advanced International Studies at Johns Hopkins University	
Malia and Sasha Obama	(attended until December 2008)	Daughters of United States President Barack Obama and First Lady Michelle Obama	
Mark Patinkin	1970	Newspaper columnist and author	
Eric Posner	1984	Professor of Law, University of Chicago	
Kwame Raoul	1982	Illinois Attorney General	
James M. Redfield	1950	Professor, classics and social thought, University of Chicago	
Salli Richardson	1985	Film and television actress	
John Rogers, Jr.	1976	Founding chairman and chief executive officer of Ariel Investments	
Ned Rorem	1940	Pulitzer prize-winning composer and author	
Sarah Rose	1992	Reality TV star, Wall Street Journal contributor, historian, and author	
Carlo Rotella	1983	Non-fiction writer, academic, professor at Boston College	
Ari Roth	1978	Artistic director, playwright, Theater J, Washington, D.C.	
Janet Rowley	1942	Geneticist, winner of Presidential Medal of Freedom	
Paul Sagan	1977	Businessman, journalist, three-time Emmy award winner	
Peter Sahlins	1975	Professor, history department, University of California, Berkeley	
Eugene Scalia	1981	U.S. Secretary of Labor	
Robert A. Sengstacke	(attended)	Photojournalist	
Kate A. Shaw	1997	Law professor at the University of Pennsylvania Law School and podcast host	
Amity Shlaes	1978	Author and newspaper and magazine columnist	
Jonathan Simon	1977	UC Berkeley School of Law professor and scholar of crime and punishment	
Justin Slaughter	1998	Member of the Illinois House of Representatives	
John Paul Stevens	1937	United States Supreme Court Justice	
Robert Storr	1967	Curator, critic, painter, dean of Yale School of Art	
Eleanor Swift	1962	Law professor at the UC Berkeley School of Law	
Garrick Utley	1956	Television journalist	
Bert Vaux	1987	Professor of phonology and morphology at University of Cambridge	
Geoffrey Ward	1957	Seven-time Emmy award-winning screenwriter and author	
David B. Wilkins	1973	Professor, Harvard Law School	
Amanda Williams	1992	Artist and architect	
Andrew Hill	(attended c. 1945)	Jazz pianist and composer	
Christopher Wool	1972	Artist	
Amy Wright	1967	Actress	

- Michael Hudson (born 1939), economics professor

== Faculty ==
- Blue Balliett, former 3rd grade teacher, author of acclaimed children's books Chasing Vermeer and The Wright 3, among others.
- Barbara T. Bowman, early childhood education expert and advocate.
- Wayne Brasler, former U-High Journalism adviser, awards annual Brasler Prize for outstanding high school journalism.
- Langston Hughes, author.
- Bertha Morris Parker, educator and author of science encyclopedias for children
- Vivian Paley, former teacher and noted child psychologist.
- Craig Robinson, former head basketball coach, former Oregon State University head basketball coach; brother of Michelle Obama.
