= Stage name =

Pseudonym used by performing artist

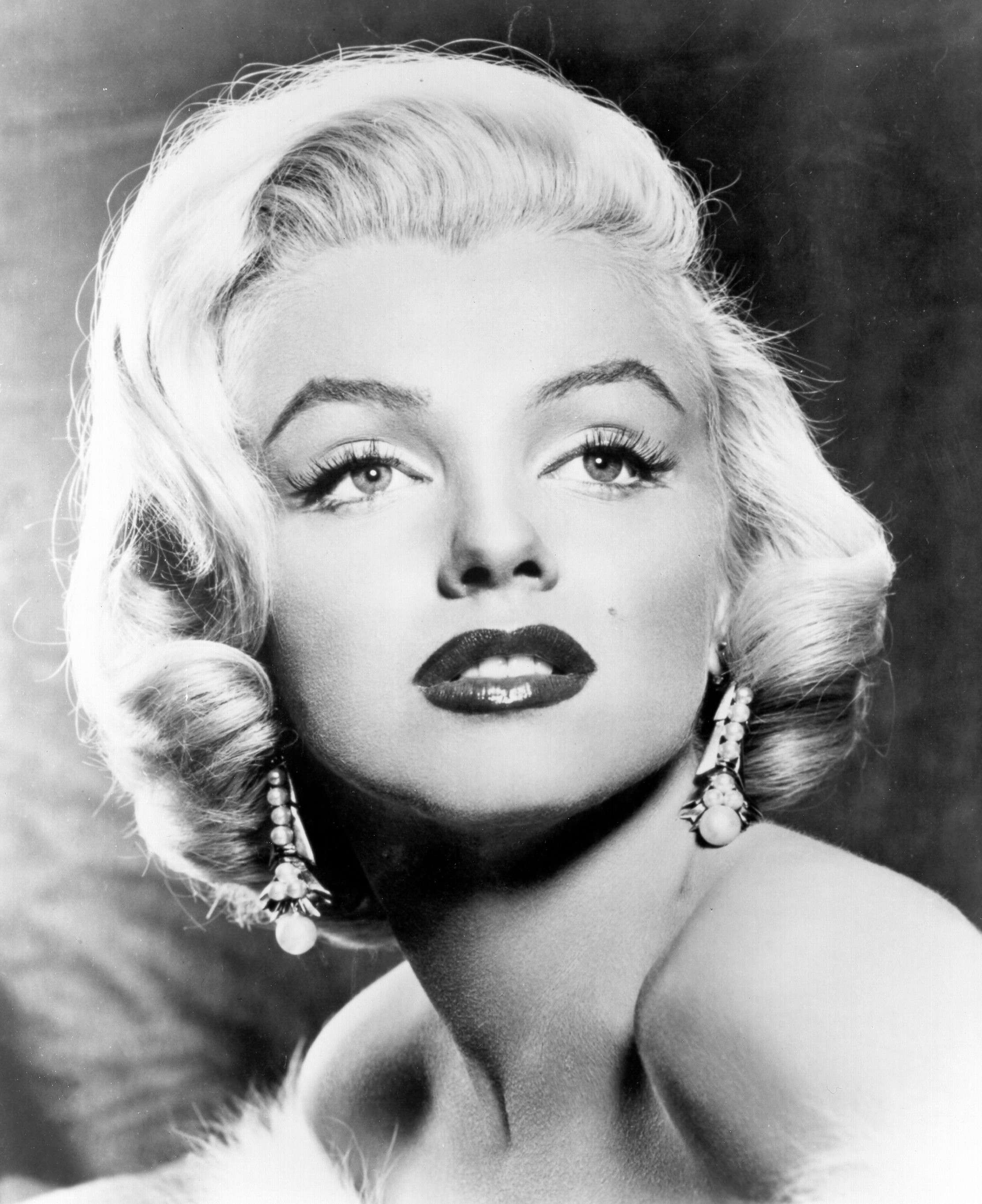
Marilyn Monroe (born Norma Jeane Mortenson) created her stage name by combining her mother's maiden name with the first name of Broadway star Marilyn Miller. It became her legal name in 1956.

A stage name or professional name is a pseudonym used by performers, authors, and entertainers—such as actors, comedians, singers, and musicians. The equivalent concept among writers is called a nom de plume (pen name). Some performers eventually choose to adopt their stage name as a legal name.

Such professional aliases are adopted for a wide variety of reasons and may be similar or nearly identical to an individual's birth name or be inspired by nicknames or maiden names. Some people take a stage name because their birth name is difficult to pronounce or spell; is considered unattractive, dull, or unintentionally amusing; or projects an undesired image. Sometimes a performer adopts a name that is unusual or outlandish to attract attention. Some individuals use a stage name because their birth name is already being used by another notable individual, including names that are not exactly the same but still too similar; many guilds and associations that represent actors mandate that no two members may have identical working names. Other performers use a stage name in order to retain anonymity, as is often the case for porn stars, especially if they intend on switching careers.

== Family connection ==
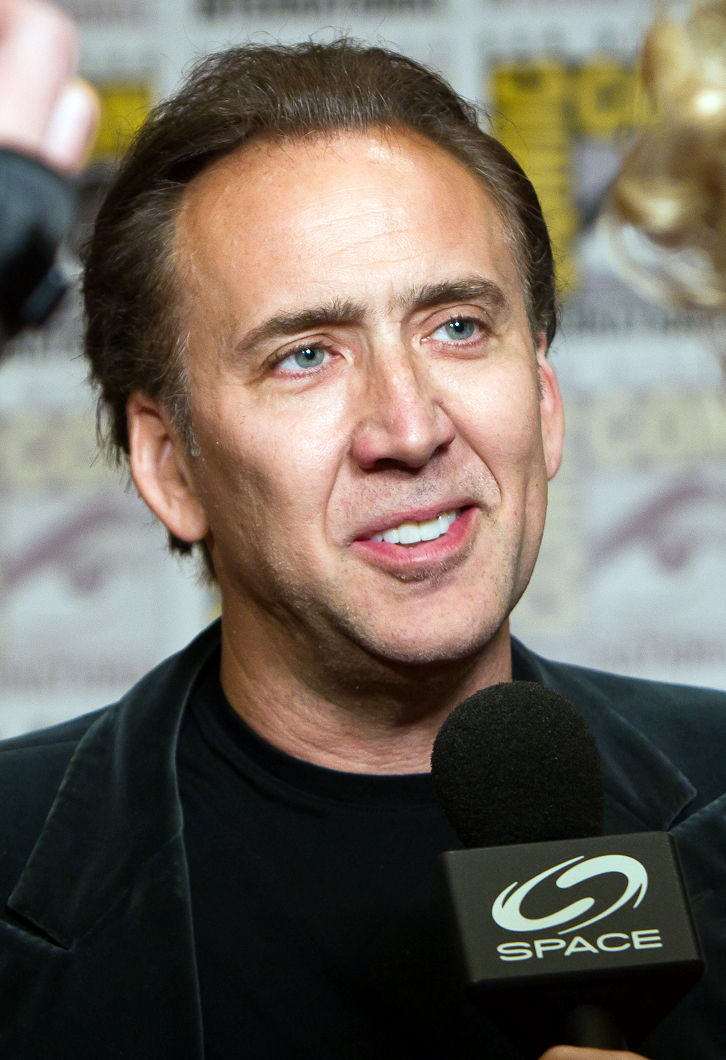
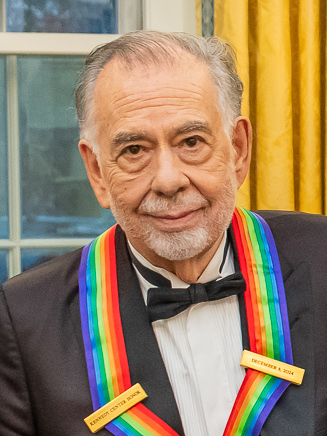
Actor Nicolas Cage (left), born Nicolas Coppola, adopted a stage name to avoid comparisons with his uncle, director Francis Ford Coppola (right).

Some individuals who are related to a celebrity take a different last name, so they are not perceived to have received undue advantage from their family connection. Actor Nicolas Cage, born Nicolas Coppola, chose a new last name to avoid comparisons with his uncle, director Francis Ford Coppola, who gave him his big break in the 1982 film Fast Times at Ridgemont High.

Conversely, individuals who wish to receive benefits from their family connections may take that person's first or last name. Lon Chaney Sr.'s son Creighton spent a number of years appearing in minor roles before renaming himself Lon Chaney Jr. Likewise, Emilio Estevez and his sister Renee chose not to take their father Martin Sheen's professional name and use their birth names. Their brother Carlos chose to use their father's professional name and took the name Charlie Sheen. Some children born outside marriage to a (usually male) celebrity parent have done the same: Jett Williams (née Antha Bell Jett) and Scott Eastwood (né Scott Clinton Reeves) each use their fathers' last names; while others have not: Joseph Baena, son of Arnold Schwarzenegger, chose not to use his father's last name.

Women who achieve fame after marriage often use their married name as part of their professional name, while women who achieved fame before marriage may continue to use their maiden name or a hyphenated surname.

In some cases, the individual may adopt a stage name to avoid confusion with other family members who have similar names. Actor Mark Harmon (Thomas Mark Harmon) uses his middle name professionally to avoid confusion with his father Heisman Trophy winner and former broadcaster Tom Harmon (Thomas Dudley Harmon).

Stephen Nice, the birth name of the lead singer of Steve Harley and Cockney Rebel, took on the stage name Steve Harley after realising that his on stage persona differed greatly from his real-life persona, and as a result feeling that he was no longer "Ronald and Joyce's (Harley's parents) little boy" when on stage.

Comedian Amos Muzyad Yaqoob Kairouz adopted the stage name Danny Thomas, largely because he did not want his friends and family to know he had gone back into working clubs where the salary was better.

== Union rules ==
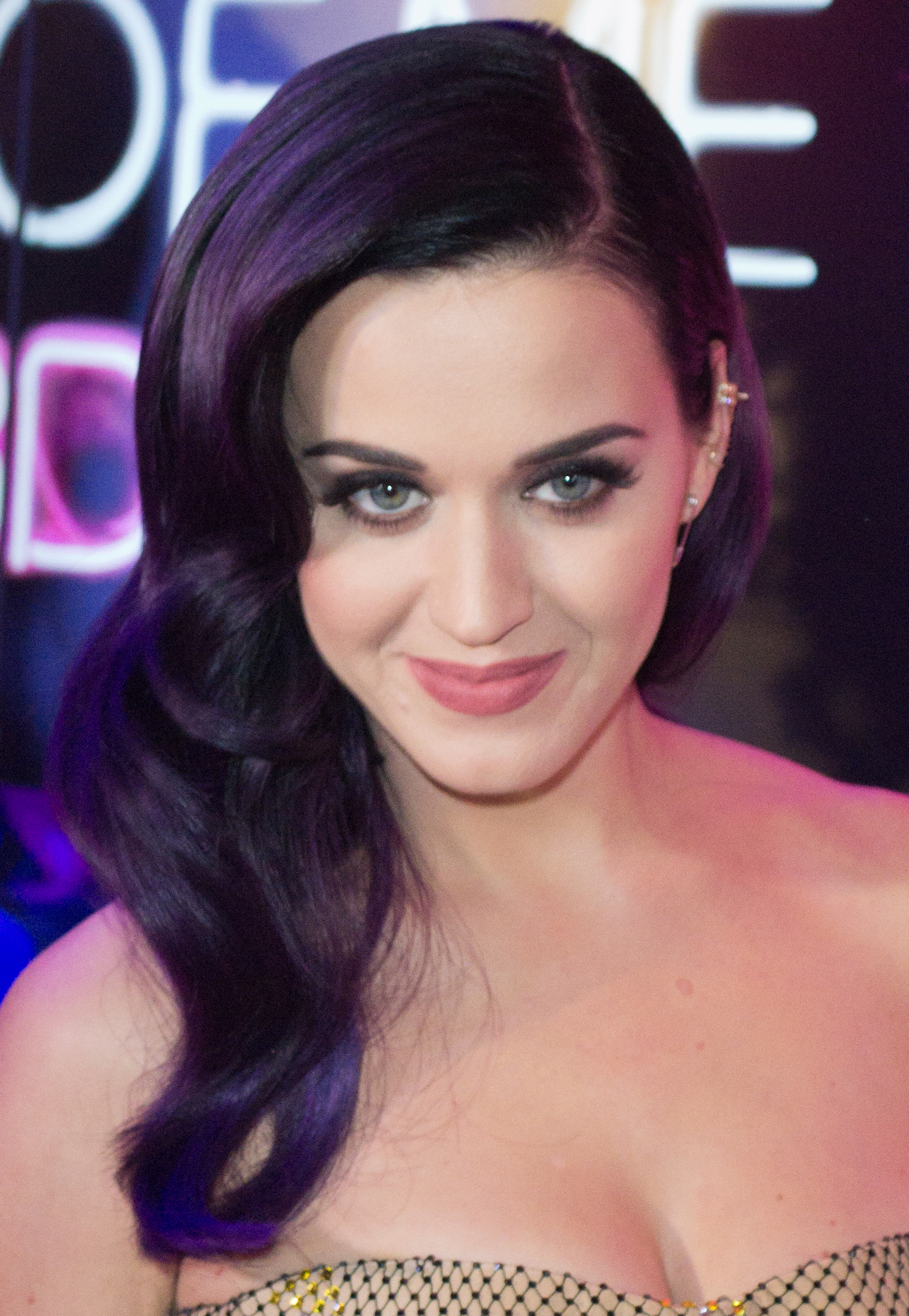
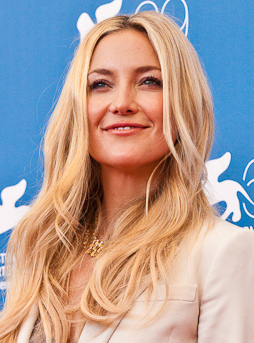
Singer Katy Perry (left), born Katheryn Hudson, uses her mother's maiden name to avoid confusion with actress Kate Hudson (right).

Guilds and associations that represent actors, such as the SAG-AFTRA (formed from a 2012 merger between the Screen Actors Guild and the American Federation of Television and Radio Artists) in the United States and Equity in the United Kingdom, stipulate that no two members may have identical working names. An actor whose name has already been taken must choose a new name. SAG-AFTRA allows any new member to keep their legal name as their stage name, even if another member has the same stage name already, as long as they sign a waiver.

Notable examples include: Nathan Lane, whose birth name (Joseph Lane) was already in use; Stewart Granger, born James Stewart. Diane Keaton, whose birth name is Diane Hall, took her mother's maiden name as a stage name after learning that there was already a registered actress named Diane Hall in the Actors' Equity Association. Ugly Betty actress Vanessa Williams officially uses "Vanessa L. Williams" because of SAG guidelines, although the other actress with same first and last name (Vanessa E. Williams) is arguably less notable. Similarly, David Walliams changed one letter in his surname owing to there being another "David Williams". Terry O'Quinn of Lost fame changed his surname from Quinn to O'Quinn as another registered actor already had the name Terrance Quinn. Long-time Simpsons writer and Futurama executive producer David X. Cohen changed his middle initial from S to X because there was already a David S. Cohen registered with the Writers Guild of America. Julianne Moore was born Julie Anne Smith but found that all variations of that name were already used by other actors. Former American football player Thomas Q. Jones added his middle initial to his name when he began acting, as his name was already taken.

The rumor that Michael Keaton, born Michael Douglas changed his surname because of an attraction to actress Diane Keaton is incorrect; he chose Keaton because of an affinity for the physical comedy of Buster Keaton.

A middle name may be adopted in preference to changing a name. American author James Finn Garner, born James Edward Garner, adopted his mother's maiden name for a middle name after joining the SAG, to avoid confusion with James Garner, and retained the name for his writing career. In some cases, attaching a generational suffix is sufficient for guild rules; broadcaster David Lawrence is credited as David H. Lawrence XVII as a result of there being sixteen other David Lawrences in show business at the time he received his SAG card.

A person hoping to become successful as an entertainer who has a name identical to a name already familiar to the public (in any field of endeavor) may change their name in order to avoid having their name evoke the other person with the same name. Singer Katy Perry, born Katheryn Elizabeth Hudson, released her self-titled album under the name Katy Hudson, but later used her mother's maiden name to avoid confusion with actress Kate Hudson.

== By suggestion ==
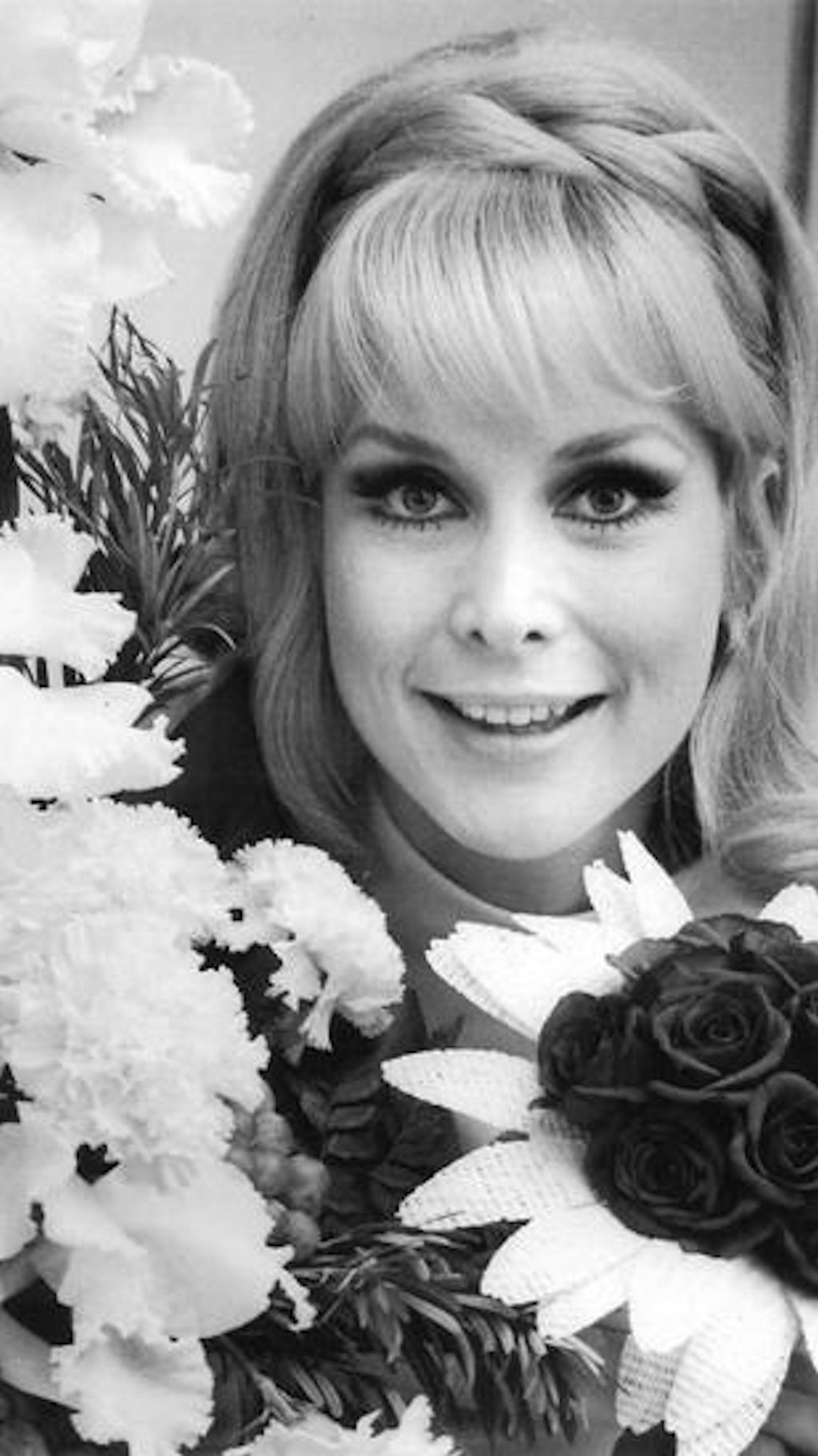
Actress Barbara Eden, born Barbara Jean Morehead, adopted the stage name chosen by her agent.

A performer may also have had their stage name chosen for them by their agent – such was the case with Barbara Eden, born Barbara Jean Morehead (later known as Barbara Huffman) – or, in the heyday of the Hollywood studios, by a movie studio.

Joan Rivers (born Joan Alexandra Molinsky) went one step further and named herself after a former agent, Tony Rivers, after he told her to change her name.

In the non-English-speaking world, an example is the Taiwanese Mandopop girl group S.H.E (composed of Selina Jen, Hebe Tian, and Ella Chen), whose members' English names were chosen by their manager after taking personality tests.

Former child star Patty Duke (whose real name is Anna Marie Duke) had her stage name chosen for her by her first managers. Their choice of the name "Patty" was inspired by another child actress named Patty McCormack.

Cary Grant (born Archibald Alexander [or Alec] Leach) had his name selected for him by Paramount Pictures. He had been using the name "Cary Lockwood", but the studio decided against it, deeming it too similar to another actor working at the time. Cary and the studio eventually settled on "Cary Grant" (Grant thought the letters "C" and "G" to be lucky: they had brought previous success for both Clark Gable and Gary Cooper).

Joan Crawford, born Lucille Fay LeSueur, had her name changed as a result of a magazine poll organised by her studio, MGM.

Gorden Kaye (born Gordon Kaye) had one letter in his first name changed owing to a spelling error by the British Actors' Equity Association; he preferred the mistake over his original name.

Maribel Guardia (born Maribel Fernandez Garcia) had her last name changed not only because was there an actress of the same first and last names, but also because "Maribel Garcia" had 13 letters; she changed the spelling of her mother's maiden name, adding a "u" and changing the "c" to a "d" in the process.

== Ethnicity ==
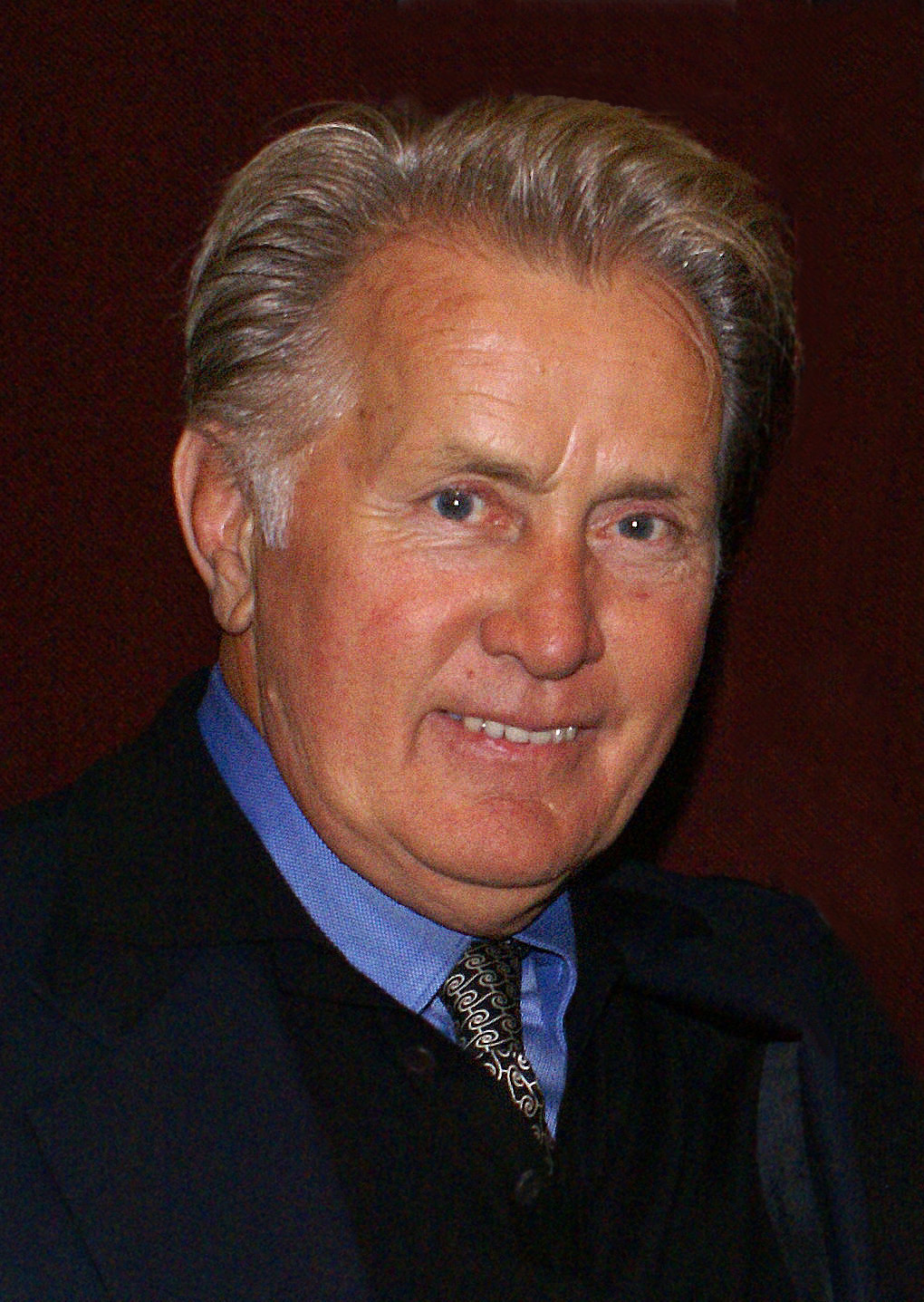
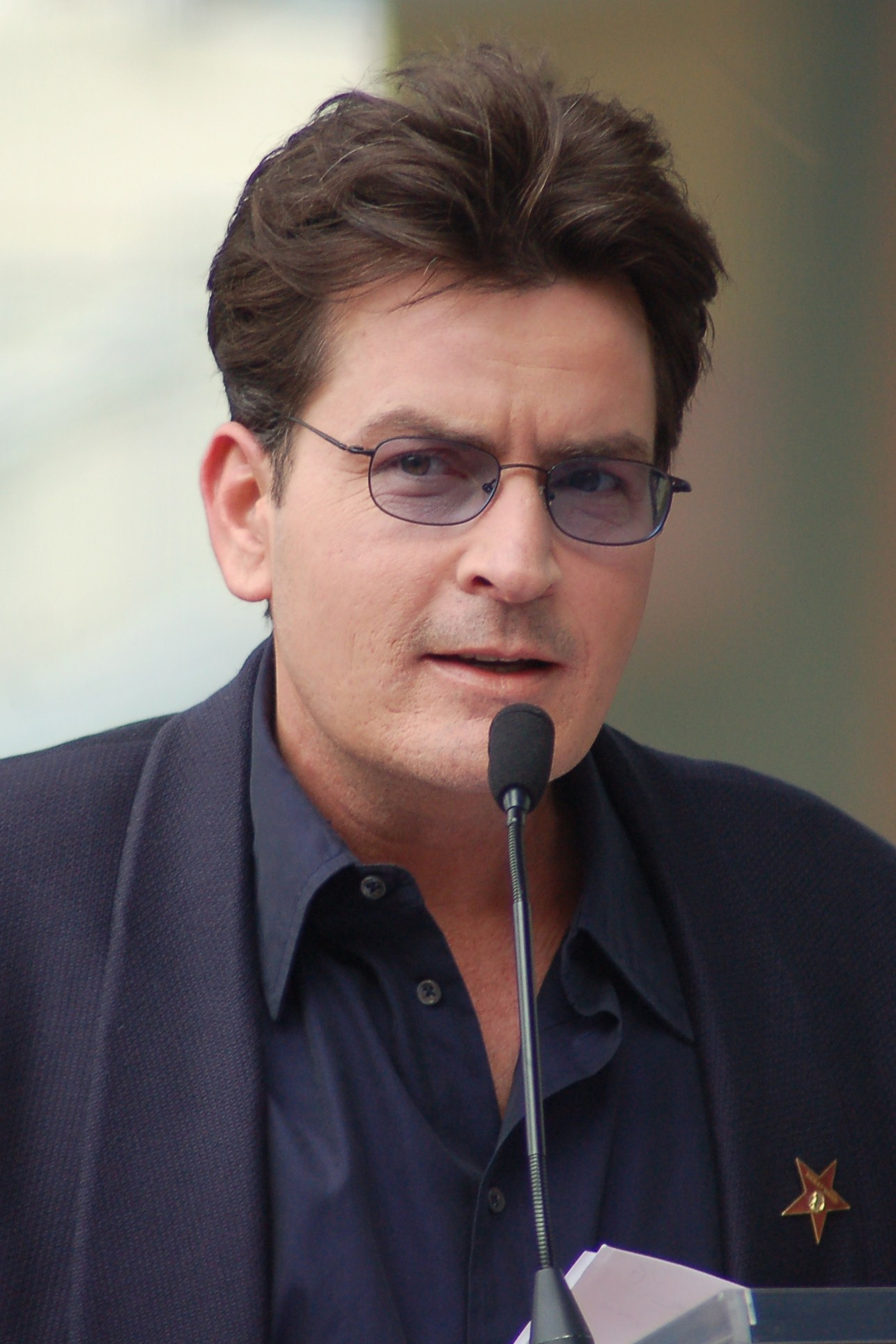
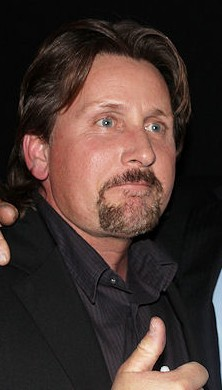
Actor Martin Sheen (left), born Ramón Estévez, adopted as stage name due to potential racial discrimination. His son Charlie Sheen (middle), born Carlos Estévez, also adopted a stage name while his other son Emilio Estevez (right) did not.

In the past, a stage name was often used when a performer's real name was considered to denote a specific ethnicity that faced potential discrimination. In other cases, actors have reinvented themselves with a more ethnic identity, when that gave them an advantage in playing "ethnic" roles.

Steven Tyler of Aerosmith changed his name from Steven Victor Tallarico "for more promotional appeal".

Historically, Jews in Hollywood were encouraged to anglicize their names to avoid possible discrimination. Examples of such name changes are Danny Kaye and Mel Brooks, both of whom were born with the surname Kaminsky, the original two lineups of The Three Stooges (born Moses Horwitz, Jerome Horwitz, Samuel Horwitz and Louis Feinberg) and Woody Allen (born Allan Konigsberg). Jon Stewart claims that he did not anglicize his name for career reasons, but because of his estranged relationship with his father. Israeli-American Natalie Portman (born Natalie Hershlag) changed her name allegedly to protect her privacy. James Goldman, retired television anchorman, has stated that he chose the name Jim Gardner because of the thought that there were too many people with Jewish last names on staff.

Ramón Estévez changed his name to Martin Sheen as he felt it affected his job prospects owing to racial discrimination and bias, although he maintains his birth name for legal documents such as his passport; his sons made divergent choices: Carlos Irwin Estévez is now Charlie Sheen, while Emilio Estevez left his name unchanged. German-born actor Hans Gudegast adopted the stage name of Eric Braeden.

Actors Anthony Quinn and Anne Bancroft were advised to anglicize their names because 'Antonio Rodolfo Quinn Oaxaca' and 'Anna Maria Louisa Italiano', respectively, were considered too 'ethnic' for Hollywood and Broadway at the time. Eydie Gorme (born Edith Garmezano), Sophia Loren (born Sofia Villani Scicolone), Charles Bronson (born Charles Dennis Buchinsky), and Rita Hayworth (born Margarita Carmen Cansino), are four more well-known examples of this trend.

Broadcaster Dave Roberts was born David T. Boreanaz but was known professionally as Dave Thomas and later Dave Roberts as ethnic surnames were discouraged when he first began his career during the 1950s; his son, actor David Boreanaz, chose not to adopt a stage name.

The use of stage names for ethnic purposes may vary widely depending on the media market the personality is representing. For example, in Buffalo, New York, a city with a large Polish-American population, Polish-American media personalities typically work freely using their birth names.

Sicilian-American actor Espera Oscar de Corti, who built his film career portraying Native Americans, reinvented himself as Iron Eyes Cody. He not only took his stage name as his legal name but eventually began insisting that he actually was Native American.

Actress Bernadette Peters (born Bernadette Lazzara) was encouraged as a child actress to use her father's first name, Peter as her last name by her mother to avoid being type-cast in Italian roles.

Chloe Bennet had used her birth name, Chloe Wang, for her singing career in China, along with a short-lived TeenNick music series. She started using the surname Bennet, after her father's first name, when she failed to be welcomed by Hollywood agents. In reverse, Nichole Bloom, an actress with mixed Japanese-Irish parentage, changed her stage name to her birth name of Nichole Sakura in the wake of the summer of 2020, to honor her Japanese heritage; she had originally used Bloom, an English equivalent to Sakura (meaning cherry blossom) out of a fear of typecasting.

== Ease of use ==
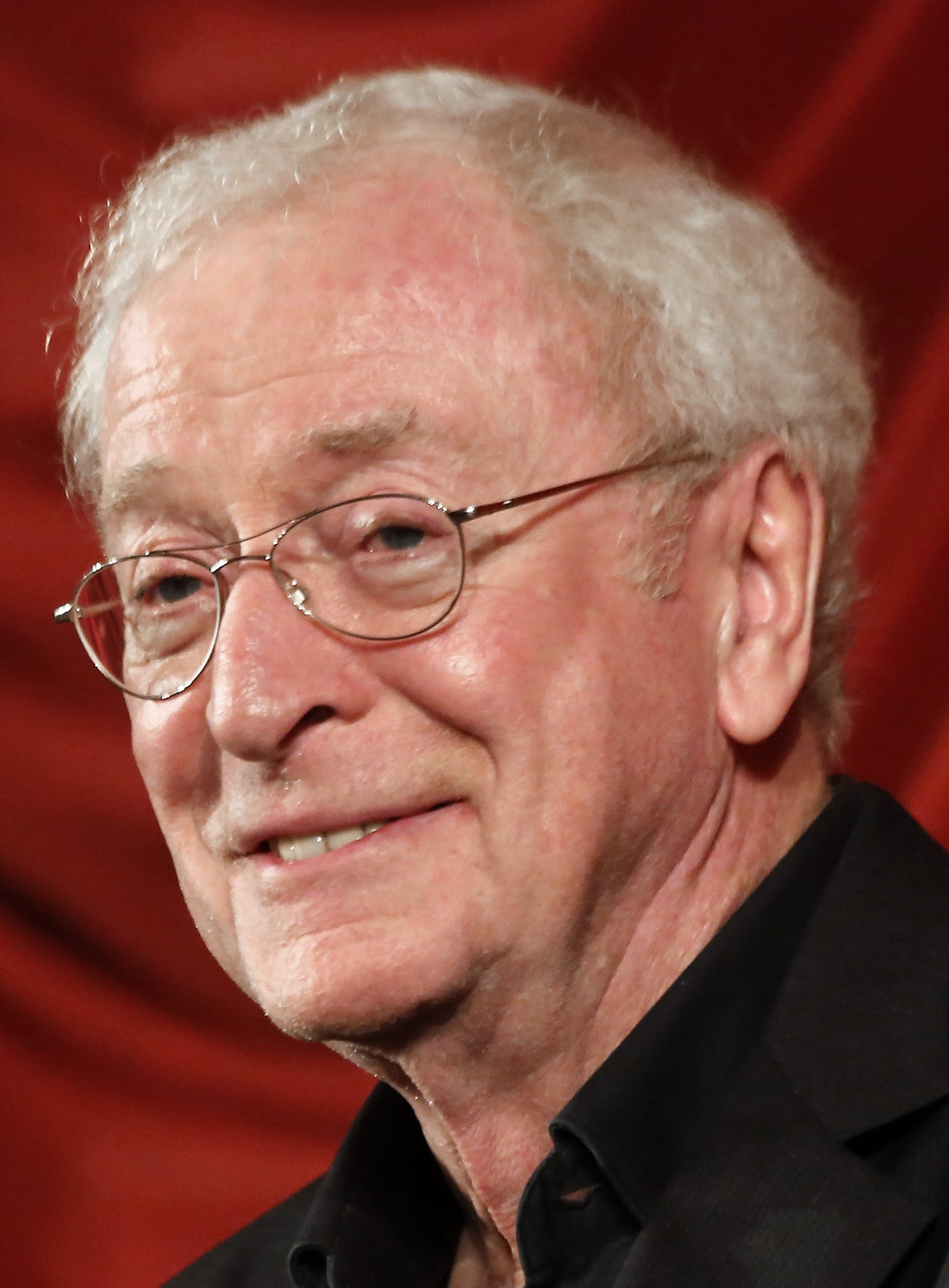
Actor Michael Caine, born Maurice Micklewhite

Another consideration in choosing a stage name is the ease of use. The Actors' Equity Association (AEA) advises performers to select a name that is easy for others to pronounce, spell, and remember. Some performers, while paying great attention to their skills and abilities, give little thought to the difference that a well-thought-out name can make to their career. Often a person or group decides on a different name only after they realize that a poorly chosen name gives a bad impression.

Actor Michael Caine was born Maurice Micklewhite and chose his new first name because he preferred the sound of it to the less glamorous-sounding "Maurice". He reputedly chose the surname "Caine" because, while deciding on a new surname, he looked across the street and saw a cinema advertising the film The Caine Mutiny. He later joked that he would be called "Michael The One Hundred and One Dalmatians" if he had looked in the other direction.

Actor Pete Postlethwaite was advised to change his surname by peers who quipped that it "would never be put up in lights outside theaters because they couldn't afford the electricity", but he decided to keep it.

In a similar situation, Doris Day (born Doris Mary Ann Kappelhoff) was told by a bandleader that her name would never fit on the marquee, and she thus took the surname "Day" because the song "Day By Day" had become one of her signature tracks.

== Relevance to image ==
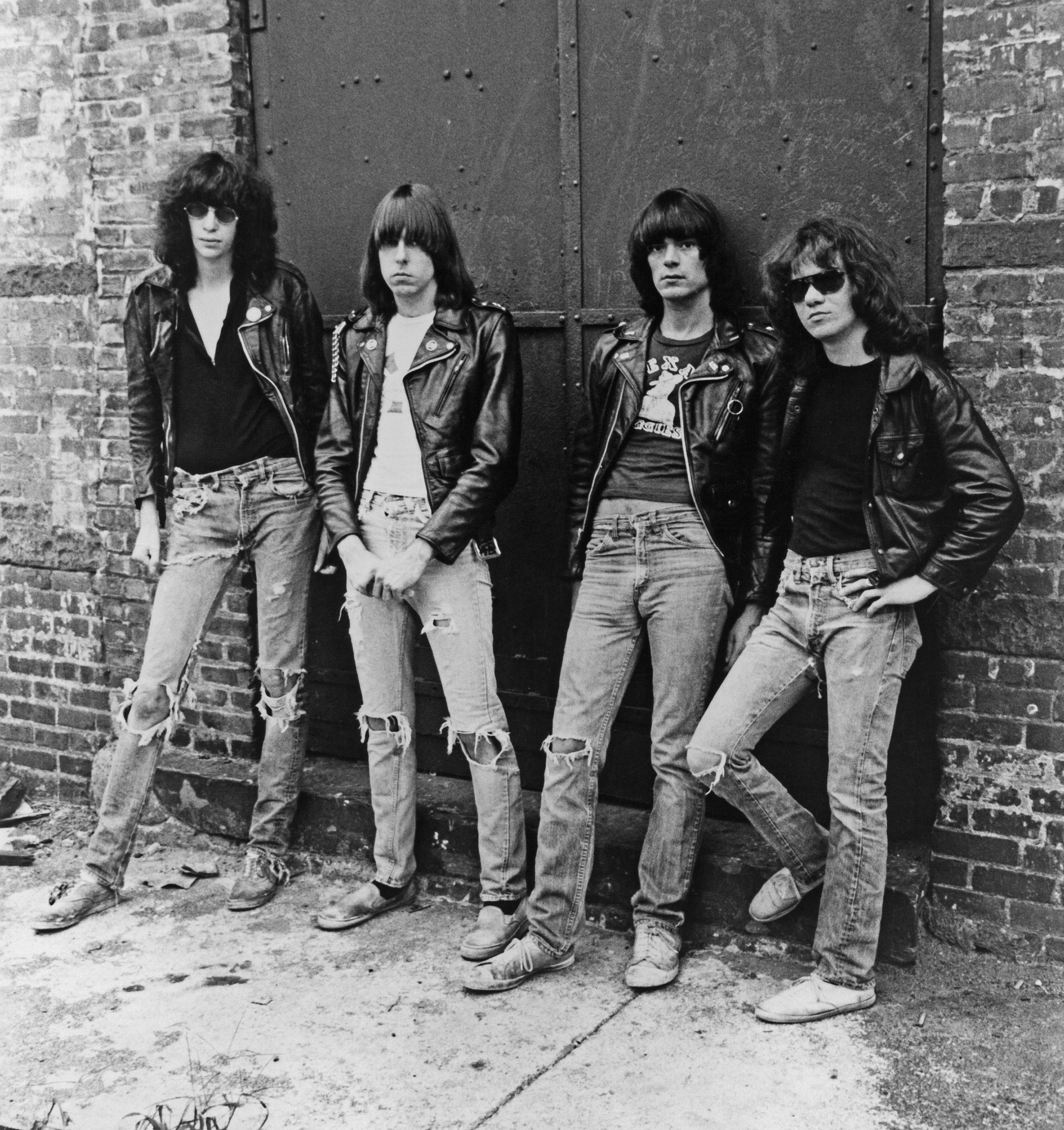
Every member of the punk band Ramones (from left to right), Joey Ramone, Johnny Ramone, Dee Dee Ramone, and Tommy Ramone, adopted the "Ramone" surname

The 19th century stage magician and contortionist who performed under the Chinese stage name Ching Lau Lauro did so to support his stage image. Believed to be from Cornwall, England, he may have been the first European magician to dress in Chinese costume on stage.

Commonly in the music world, especially those of heavy metal, punk rock, industrial, and hip-hop, musicians will rename themselves with names more menacing or striking than their birth names. Every member of the punk band Ramones took the pseudonymous "Ramone" surname as part of their collective stage persona. Members of New Zealand art-rock band Split Enz all took their middle names as stage names, so as to keep their private image separate from their public personae.

Other performers may assume stage names as a means of distancing themselves from publicly known childhood names that could be considered professionally embarrassing, outlandish, or otherwise inappropriate. Film director Duncan Jones (son of singer David Bowie) was known publicly as a child as Zowie Bowie.

Rappers are known to use stage names, such as Jay-Z (Shawn Carter), 50 Cent (Curtis Jackson), Diddy (Sean Combs), Young Thug (Jeffery Williams), Ludacris (Chris Bridges), Lil Wayne (Dwayne Carter Jr.), and Soulja Boy (DeAndre Way). At times, these artists will use their real names to make some of their material seem more authentic or personal. Eminem (Marshall Mathers) took his stage name from the pronunciation of his initials (M and M), and later used his real name at various public events and as an alter ego after his real name gained recognition following the release of his multi-platinum album The Marshall Mathers LP. LL Cool J (James Todd Smith) referenced his real name on the albums Mr. Smith and Todd Smith. Queen Latifah (Dana Owens) released The Dana Owens Album after changing her focus from hip-hop to jazz. Xzibit (Alvin Joiner) has also been credited by his real name when acting in several television shows.

== Euphony and ease of remembrance ==
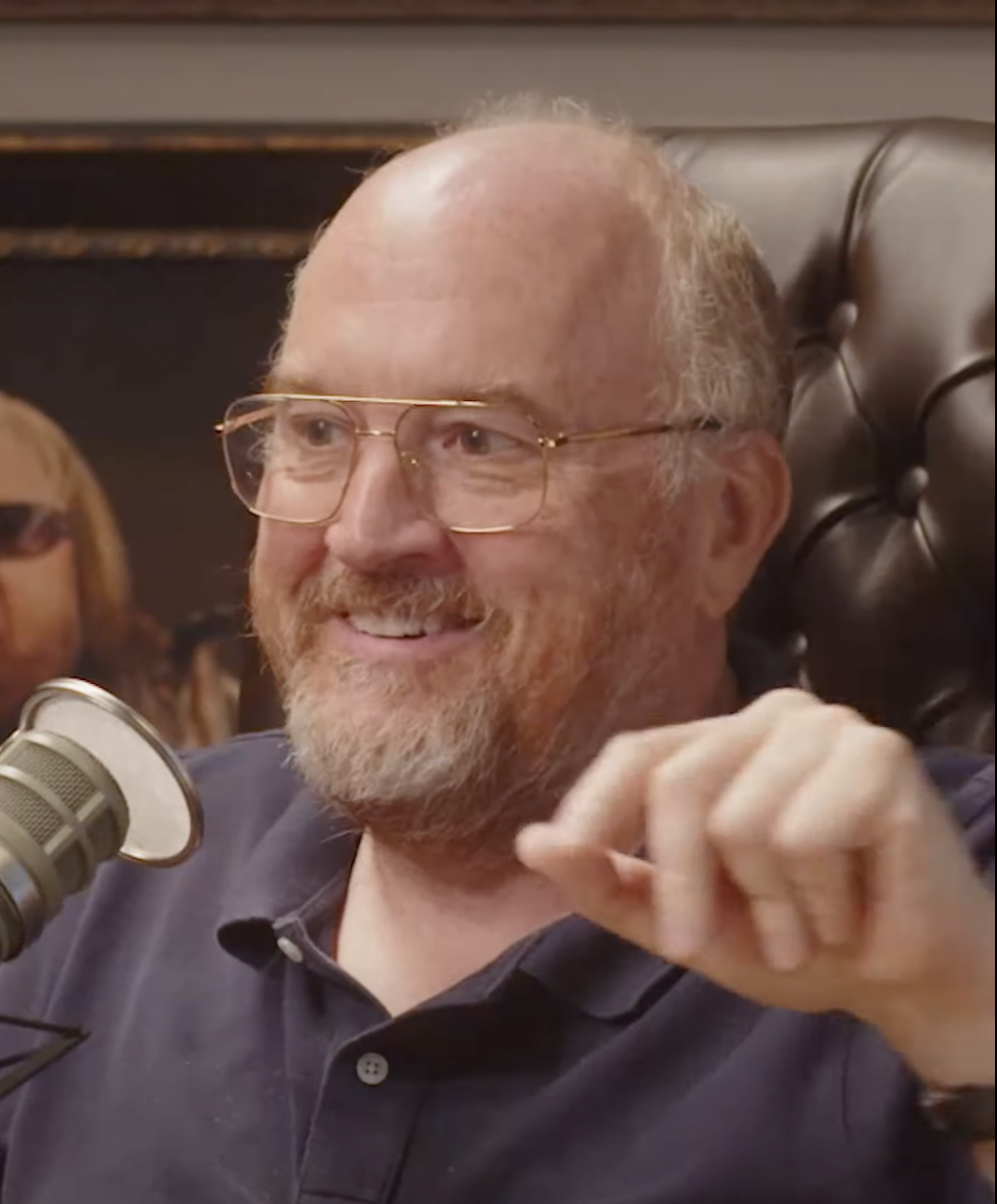
Stand-up comedian Louis C.K. adopted his stage name from the phonetic spelling of his Hungarian surname, Székely.

Some performers and artists may choose to simplify their name to make it easier to spell and pronounce, and easier for others to remember. For instance, Fall Out Boy vocalist and guitarist Patrick Stump removed the "h" from his original surname, Stumph. It was still pronounced "stump", but the change ensured his audience would not think to pronounce it "stumf". Singer Jason Derulo (known for announcing his name in many of the introductions of his songs) uses the phonetic spelling of his given name, Jason Desrouleaux. Australian actress Yvonne Strahovski adopted a phonetic spelling of her Polish surname, Strzechowski, as her stage name upon moving to the United States. American stand-up comedian Louis C.K. adopted his stage name from the phonetic spelling of his Hungarian surname, Székely.

Andy Warhol dropped an "a" from his original name, Warhola, while couturier Yves Mathieu-Saint-Laurent dropped the first of his two surnames. Rodolfo Alfonso Raffaello Piero Filiberto Guglielmi adopted the stage name Rudolph Valentino in part because American casting directors found his original surname difficult to pronounce. Singer George Michael (the son of a Greek Cypriot restaurateur in North London) was born Georgios Kyriacos Panayiotou.

Some surnames may carry unfortunate connotations. Hal Linden, born Harold Lipshitz, adopted his stage name for fear that the embedded obscenity in his original surname could cost him work. Ralph Lauren's brother (who was his guardian) changed their family name from Lifshitz for a similar reason: fear of mockery. Duran Duran's Nick Rhodes, born Nicholas James Bates, changed his name to escape childhood ridicule (as a child, children would often tease him by calling him "Master Bates"); he adopted the surname "Rhodes" after the keyboard manufacturer of the same name. Diana Dors was born Diana Fluck (one letter away from a profanity); this prompted her to change her name to a more benign one in order to avoid an accidental obscenity (which could have been exacerbated by her status as a sex symbol).

== Musical use ==
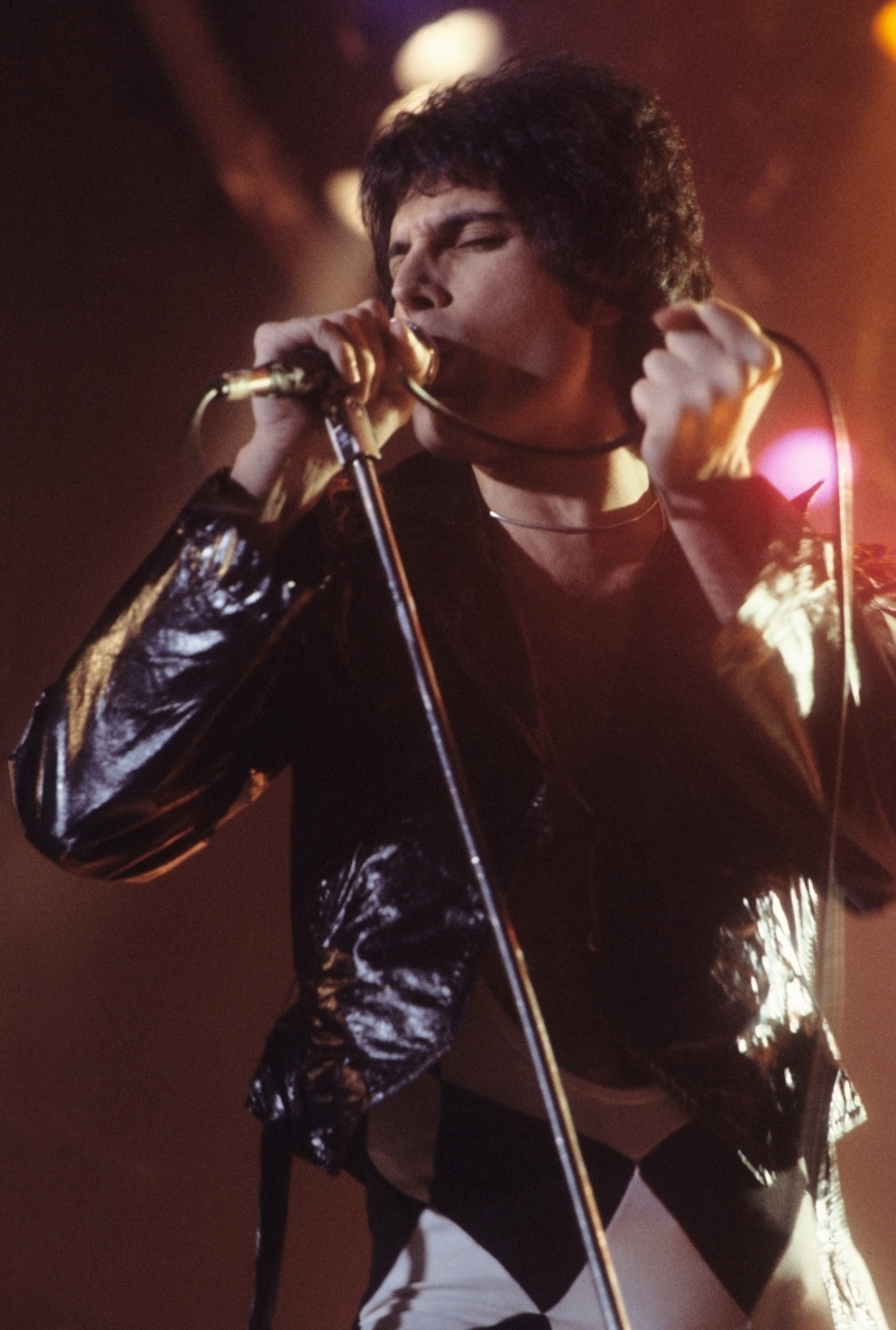
Singer Freddie Mercury legally changed his name from Farrokh Bulsara.

Some types of music are more associated with stage names than others. For example, hip-hop and EDM artists almost always use stage names, whereas "classical" composers and performers rarely do. Classical violinist Amadéus Leopold (born in South Korea as Yoo Hanbin) and opera singers Beverly Sills (born Belle Miriam Silverman), Nellie Melba (born Helen Porter Mitchell) and Jennifer Toye (born Jennifer Gay Bishop) are exceptions.

Some Algerian raï musicians use the prefix Cheb (for men) or Chaba (Chebba) for women. Both Arabic words mean "young" (e.g. as in Cheb Khaled, or "Young Khaled").

John Paul Jones of Led Zeppelin was born John Baldwin, which he used as a stage name. He later legally changed it to John Paul Jones.

Some performers take a series of different stage names. The British pop singer who was successful in the 1970s as Alvin Stardust previously went by the stage name of Shane Fenton in the 1960s. He had been born Bernard William Jewry. Some performers will use different names in different settings. Charles Thompson, singer-songwriter for the alternative band the Pixies, was known in that band as Black Francis. He was called Frank Black as a solo performer and again called Black Francis in a reunited Pixies.

Unlike Hollywood stage names, many musical artists' stage names are obviously not personal names, but they may still end up universally used to refer to the performer, such as Lady Gaga. At times the line may be blurred between the name of an act and the stage name of the lead.

Many performers refer to their stage name as their "professional name". For instance David Jones became David Bowie in order to avoid confusion with Davy Jones of the Monkees but retained Jones as his legal name. In some cases, performers subsequently adopt their stage name as their legal name. For instance, the former Robert Allen Zimmerman's legal name has been Robert Dylan (Bob Dylan) since he changed it in New York City Supreme Court in August 1962. Elton John was born Reginald Kenneth Dwight but changed his name by deed poll, making Elton Hercules John his real name. When he was knighted, he became Sir Elton Hercules John rather than Sir Reginald Kenneth Dwight. Similarly, Freddie Mercury was born Farrokh Bulsara, but legally changed his name concurrently with the formation of Queen. Elvis Costello (born Declan MacManus), who had adopted his professional name as a legal name, changed it back to his birth name in 1986. Another example is Marvin Lee Aday, known by his stage name Meat Loaf. In a similar way, actress and singer Miley Cyrus was born Destiny Hope Cyrus but found "Miley" more comfortable, making it her legal name.

Entire musical groups have been known to adopt a common stage surname, the most notable arguably being the Ramones. Recent examples include The Donnas, Those Darlins, Los Campesinos! and Ween.

== See also ==
- Alter ego
- Bardic name
- List of stage names
- Nickname
- Nom de guerre
- Notname for historical artists
- Passing (racial identity)
- Pen name
- Pseudonym
- Ring name
