= Stephen Shenker =

American physicist

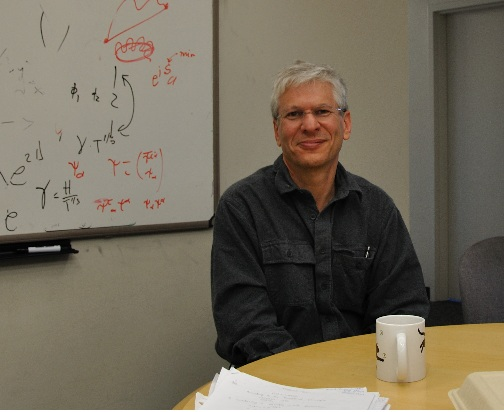
- Born: 1953
- Education: Harvard University (B.A.); Cornell University (Ph.D.)
- Known for: string theory phase transitions
- Awards: MacArthur Fellowship; American Academy of Arts and Sciences; Lars Onsager Prize (2010); National Academy of Sciences; Dirac Medal (2023)
- Scientific career
- Fields: theoretical physics
- Workplaces: Stanford University; Rutgers University; University of Chicago
- Doctoral advisor: John Kogut
- Doctoral students: Joanne Cohn; Matthew Kleban

Stephen Hart Shenker (born 1953) is an American theoretical physicist who works on string theory. He is a professor at Stanford University and former director of the Stanford Institute for Theoretical Physics. His brother Scott Shenker is a computer scientist.

== Work ==
Shenker's contributions to physics include:

- Basic results on the phase structure of gauge theories (with Eduardo Fradkin)
- Basic results on two dimensional conformal field theory and its relation to string theory (with Daniel Friedan, Emil Martinec, Zongan Qiu, and others)
- The nonperturbative formulation of matrix models of low-dimensional string theory, the first nonperturbative definitions of string theory (with Michael R. Douglas)
- The discovery of distinctively stringy nonperturbative effects in string theory, later understood to be caused by D-branes. These effects play a major role in string dynamics
- The discovery of Matrix Theory, the first nonperturbative definition of String/M theory in a physical number of dimensions. Matrix Theory (see matrix string theory) is an example of a gauge/gravity duality and is now understood to be a special case of the AdS/CFT correspondence (with Tom Banks, Willy Fischler and Leonard Susskind)
- Basic results on the connection between quantum gravity and quantum chaos (with Douglas Stanford, Juan Maldacena and others)

== Selected works ==
- Fidkowski, Lukasz; Hubeny, Veronika; Kleban, Matthew; Shenker, Stephen (6 February 2004). "The Black Hole Singularity in AdS/CFT". Journal of High Energy Physics. 2004 (2): 014. arXiv:hep-th/0306170. Bibcode:2004JHEP...02..014F. doi:10.1088/1126-6708/2004/02/014. S2CID 119363210.
