= Veronika Hubeny =

American physicist

Veronika E. Hubeny
- Education: University of Maryland; University of California, Santa Barbara
- Scientific career
- Fields: Theoretical physics; string theory; quantum gravity
- Institutions: Durham University; Institute for Advanced Study; University of California, Davis
- Doctoral advisor: Gary Horowitz

Veronika E. Hubeny is an American physicist and academic who specialises in string theory and quantum gravity. In 2015, she became a professor in the Department of Physics and set up the Center of Quantum Information Science and Technology at the University of California, Davis.

Previously, Hubeny was Professor of Physics at Durham University, where she had worked from 2005-2015. From January to April 2014, she was a member of the Institute for Advanced Study in Princeton, New Jersey. In 2019, she was selected as a fellow of the International Society on General Relativity and Gravitation.

== Selected works ==
- Horowitz, Gary T.; Hubeny, Veronika E. (2000). "Quasinormal modes of AdS black holes and the approach to thermal equilibrium". Physical Review D. 62 (2) 024027. arXiv:hep-th/9909056. Bibcode:2000PhRvD..62b4027H. doi:10.1103/PhysRevD.62.024027. S2CID 15182652.
- Fidkowski, Lukasz; Hubeny, Veronika; Kleban, Matthew; Shenker, Stephen (6 February 2004). "The Black Hole Singularity in AdS/CFT". Journal of High Energy Physics. 2004 (2): 014. arXiv:hep-th/0306170. Bibcode:2004JHEP...02..014F. doi:10.1088/1126-6708/2004/02/014. S2CID 119363210.
- Hubeny, Veronika E.; Rangamani, Mukund; Takayanagi, Tadashi (2007). "A covariant holographic entanglement entropy proposal". Journal of High Energy Physics. 2007 (7): 062. arXiv:0705.0016. Bibcode:2007JHEP...07..062H. doi:10.1088/1126-6708/2007/07/062. S2CID 15206042.
- Bhattacharyya, Sayantani; Hubeny, Veronika E.; Minwalla, Shiraz; Rangamani, Mukund (2008). "Nonlinear fluid dynamics from gravity". Journal of High Energy Physics. 2008 (2): 045. arXiv:0712.2456. Bibcode:2008JHEP...02..045B. doi:10.1088/1126-6708/2008/02/045. S2CID 2182383.
- Bhattacharyya, Sayantani; Hubeny, Veronika E.; Loganayagam, R.; Mandal, Gautam; Minwalla, Shiraz; Morita, Takeshi; Rangamani, Mukund; Reall, Harvey S. (2008). "Local fluid dynamical entropy from gravity". Journal of High Energy Physics. 2008 (6): 055. arXiv:0803.2526. Bibcode:2008JHEP...06..055B. doi:10.1088/1126-6708/2008/06/055. S2CID 3085486.
- Hubeny, Veronika E. (2011). "The fluid/gravity correspondence: a new perspective on the membrane paradigm". Classical and Quantum Gravity. 28 (11) 114007. arXiv:1011.4948. Bibcode:2011CQGra..28k4007H. doi:10.1088/0264-9381/28/11/114007. S2CID 73554697.
- Hubeny, Veronika E.; Rangamani, Mukund (2012). "Causal holographic information". Journal of High Energy Physics. 2012 (6): 114. arXiv:1204.1698. Bibcode:2012JHEP...06..114H. doi:10.1007/JHEP06(2012)114. S2CID 118555744.
- Headrick, Matthew; Hubeny, Veronika E.; Lawrence, Albion; Rangamani, Mukund (2014). "Causality & holographic entanglement entropy". Journal of High Energy Physics. 2014 (12): 162. arXiv:1408.6300. Bibcode:2014JHEP...12..162H. doi:10.1007/JHEP12(2014)162. S2CID 53656032.
