= Cheb (disambiguation) =

Cheb is a city in the Czech Republic.

Cheb may also refer to:

- Cheb, Iran, a village in Iran
- Cheb (film), a 1991 film
- Cheb Balowski, a Spanish musical group of ten singers in Spanish, Catalan, and Arabic
- Cheb i Sabbah (1947–2013), DJ
- a title for raï musicians (from Arabic شاب shābb, "young man"):
  - Cheb Bilal (born 1966), well-known Algerian raï singer
  - Cheb Hasni (1968–1994), performer of Algerian raï music
  - Cheb Khaled, another raï music performer
  - Cheb Mami (born 1966), stage name of another Algerian raï music performer
  - Cheb Sahraoui (born 1961), Algerian raï musician
  - Cheb (musician), Moroccan musician

== Biology ==
- CheB, is a demethylase of methyl-accepting chemotaxis proteins (MCP)
