= Usyskin =

Usyskin, also Usiskin, Usyshkin, Ussishkin, etc., is a Jewish surname. According to Alexander Beider's Dictionary of Jewish Surnames from the Russian Empire, the surname is derived from the river Usyska. Vladimir Maksimov of the research centre "Surname History" mentions other versions. In particular he points out that in the 19th century there was a settlement Usyska by the river, as well as that Usyska was a diminutive for the name Sisoy. Beider notes that the surname was recorded in Vitebsk, Gorodok and Velizh uyezds of Vitebsk Governorate, Russia. Notable people with the surname include:

- Aleksandr Usyskin, Soviet counter admiral
- Ilya Usyskin (1910–1934), Soviet physicist, crew member of the stratospheric aerostat Osoaviakhim-1
- David Ussishkin (born 1935) Israeli archeologist
- Menachem Ussishkin (1863–1941), Russian-born Zionist leader and head of the Jewish National Fund
- Zalman Usiskin, American mathematics educator, director of the University of Chicago School Mathematics Project
- Ussishkin, a character from the 1972 Soviet comedy film Ilf and Petrov Rode a Tram

== See also ==
- Ussishkin Fortress
