= Joanne Cohn =

American physicist

- Education: Harvard University (B.A.); University of Chicago (Ph.D.)
- Known for: ArXiv
- Awards: NSF POWRE Award, Career Advancement Award
- Scientific career
- Fields: Cosmology, Particle Physics
- Workplaces: University of California, Berkeley
- Thesis: (1988)
- Doctoral advisor: Daniel Friedan and Stephen Shenker
- Website: astro.berkeley.edu/~jcohn/

Joanne Cohn is an American astrophysicist known for her work in cosmology and particle physics. She is also known for her role in the creation of the ArXiv.org e-print archive. Cohn is a Senior Space Fellow and Full Researcher in the Space Sciences Lab at the University of California, Berkeley.

== Early life and education ==
Cohn grew up in Denver, Colorado. After learning about special relativity around the age of 11, she knew she wanted to become a physicist. After graduating from Thomas Jefferson High School in Denver, she attended Harvard University where she worked with Darby L. Winn on the Harvard-Wisconsin-Purdue proton decay experiment. Cohn also contributed to the MAC ee detector at the University of Colorado with William Ford, which would later be used in the SLAC National Accelerator Laboratory.

Cohn graduated summa cum laude from Harvard University in 1983 with an A.B. in physics. She earned her Ph.D. in 1988 from the University of Chicago, where she wrote her dissertation on superstring theory with her advisors Daniel Friedan and Stephen Shenker.

== Career and awards ==
After earning her Ph.D., Cohn was a member of the Institute for Advanced Study at Princeton from 1988 until 1991, when she joined the Fermilab Particle Theory Group as a research associate until 1993. She was then a postdoctoral research physicist at the University of California, Berkeley until 1996, after which she spent a year as a Bunting Fellow at Radcliffe College, Harvard University. In 1997, she accepted a position in the department of astronomy and physics at the University of Illinois at Urbana-Champaign as a visiting research assistant professor. Between 1999 and 2002, Cohn was associated with the Harvard College Observatory. In 2002, Cohn returned to Berkeley as a lecturer, eventually attaining the ranks of senior fellow and assistant researcher in 2002, associate researcher in 2008, and full researcher in 2013. Presently, Cohn is a senior space fellow and full researcher in the space sciences lab at the University of California, Berkeley.

Cohn has received several awards and grants, including:

- 4 Department of Energy Research Grants (2007, 2008, 2012, 2013)
- National Science Foundation EXC Research Grant (2002)
- National Science Foundation POWRE Award (2000)
- National Science Foundation Career Advancement Award (1997)
- Bunting Fellowship, Radcliffe College (1996)
- Claire Booth Luce Fellowship, Henry Luce Foundation (1989, 1990)
- Zonta Amelia Earhart Fellowship (1985, 1986, 1987)
- McCormick Fellowship, University of Chicago (1983 - 1986)

== Research ==
Cohn's current research interests focus on physical cosmology, including structure formation, galaxy formation and evolution. She has also worked on analytic methods for baryon oscillations, strong gravitational lensing analyses of systems, and issues related to analyzing cluster correlation functions. In her early career, Cohn worked on early universe field theory and string theory. She has received grants from the Department of Energy and the National Science Foundation.

== Connection with ArXiv ==
Between 1989 and 1991, Cohn maintained an electronic mailing list for sharing theoretical physics preprints or "e-prints" for an informal group of string theorists. At a chance encounter at the Aspen Center for Physics in the summer of 1991, Paul Ginsparg, then at the Los Alamos National Laboratory, asked Cohn why she had yet to automate her email list. He volunteered to create an automated system for sharing preprints, and by the next day had some sample scripts that he showed to Cohn. Two months later, the Los Alamos ArXiv, which now resides at Cornell University, was created. This system has developed into the arXiv, a preprint server, that is used millions of times per day by scientists across many fields, not only physics.
