= Matthew Headrick =

American physicist

Matthew Peter Headrick
- Born: About 1973
- Education: Harvard University; Princeton University; UCLS
- Awards: Regeneron Science Talent Search; NSF-GRF; Phi Beta Kappa; Sigma Xi
- Scientific career
- Fields: Physicist
- Workplaces: Brandeis University; Stanford University; MIT; Tata Institute of Fundamental Research; Harvard University; Peace Corps
- Thesis: Noncommutative solitons and closed string tachyons (2002)
- Doctoral advisor: Shiraz Minwalla
- Other academic advisors: J. Richard Gott
- Website: www.brandeis.edu/departments/physics/people/faculty/headrick.html

Matthew Peter Headrick (born ca. 1973) is an American physicist who is a Professor of Physics at Brandeis University. He received his PhD from Harvard University in 2002 under Shiraz Minwalla and his A.B from Princeton University in 1994. Headrick is known for his contributions to the quantum information perspective on holography.

Headrick is notable as the 1990 winner of the Intel (then Westinghouse) Science Talent Search while a high school student at the University of Chicago Laboratory Schools, an event that generated intense media coverage. He appeared on talk shows including Today. In response to the award, then-Illinois Gov. Thompson declared a "Matthew Headrick Day" and the US House of Representatives also made a proclamation.

== Selected publications ==
- Constable, Neil R; Freedman, Daniel Z; Headrick, Matthew; Minwalla, Shiraz; Motl, Lubos; Postnikov, Alexander; Skiba, Witold (2002). "PP-wave string interactions from perturbative Yang–Mills theory". Journal of High Energy Physics. 2002 (7): 017. arXiv:hep-th/0205089. Bibcode:2002JHEP...07..017C. doi:10.1088/1126-6708/2002/07/017. S2CID 3206249.
- Constable, Neil R; Freedman, Daniel Z; Headrick, Matthew; Minwalla, Shiraz (2002). "Operator Mixing and the BMN Correspondence". Journal of High Energy Physics. 2002 (10): 068. arXiv:hep-th/0209002. Bibcode:2002JHEP...10..068C. doi:10.1088/1126-6708/2002/10/068. S2CID 118892195.
- Gopakumar, Rajesh; Headrick, Matthew; Spradlin, Marcus (2003). "On Noncommutative Multi-Solitons". Communications in Mathematical Physics. 233 (2): 355–381. arXiv:hep-th/0103256. Bibcode:2003CMaPh.233..355G. doi:10.1007/s00220-002-0734-z. S2CID 119547261.
- Headrick, Matthew; Takayanagi, Tadashi (2007). "Holographic proof of the strong subadditivity of entanglement entropy". Physical Review D. 76 (10) 106013. arXiv:0704.3719. Bibcode:2007PhRvD..76j6013H. doi:10.1103/PhysRevD.76.106013. S2CID 7716686.
- Headrick, Matthew (2010). "Entanglement Rényi entropies in holographic theories". Physical Review D. 82 (12) 126010. arXiv:1006.0047. Bibcode:2010PhRvD..82l6010H. doi:10.1103/PhysRevD.82.126010. S2CID 118447819.
- Headrick, Matthew; Hubeny, Veronika E.; Lawrence, Albion; Rangamani, Mukund (2014). "Causality & holographic entanglement entropy". Journal of High Energy Physics. 2014 (12): 162. arXiv:1408.6300. Bibcode:2014JHEP...12..162H. doi:10.1007/JHEP12(2014)162. S2CID 53656032.

== See also ==
- List of University of Chicago Laboratory Schools people
