= Kleban =

Kleban is a surname. Notable people with the surname include:

- Edward Kleban (1939–1987), American musical theatre composer and lyricist
- Matthew Kleban, American theoretical physicist
