= Mike Douglass =

Mike Douglass may refer to:

- Mike Douglass (urban planner), American urban planner and social scientist
- Mike Douglass (American football) (born 1955), American football linebacker
- Michael Douglass (sport shooter) (born 1976), American sports shooter

== See also ==
- Mike Douglas (1920–2006), American Big Band era singer, entertainer, and television talk show host
- Michael Douglas (disambiguation)
