= Yaron Oz =

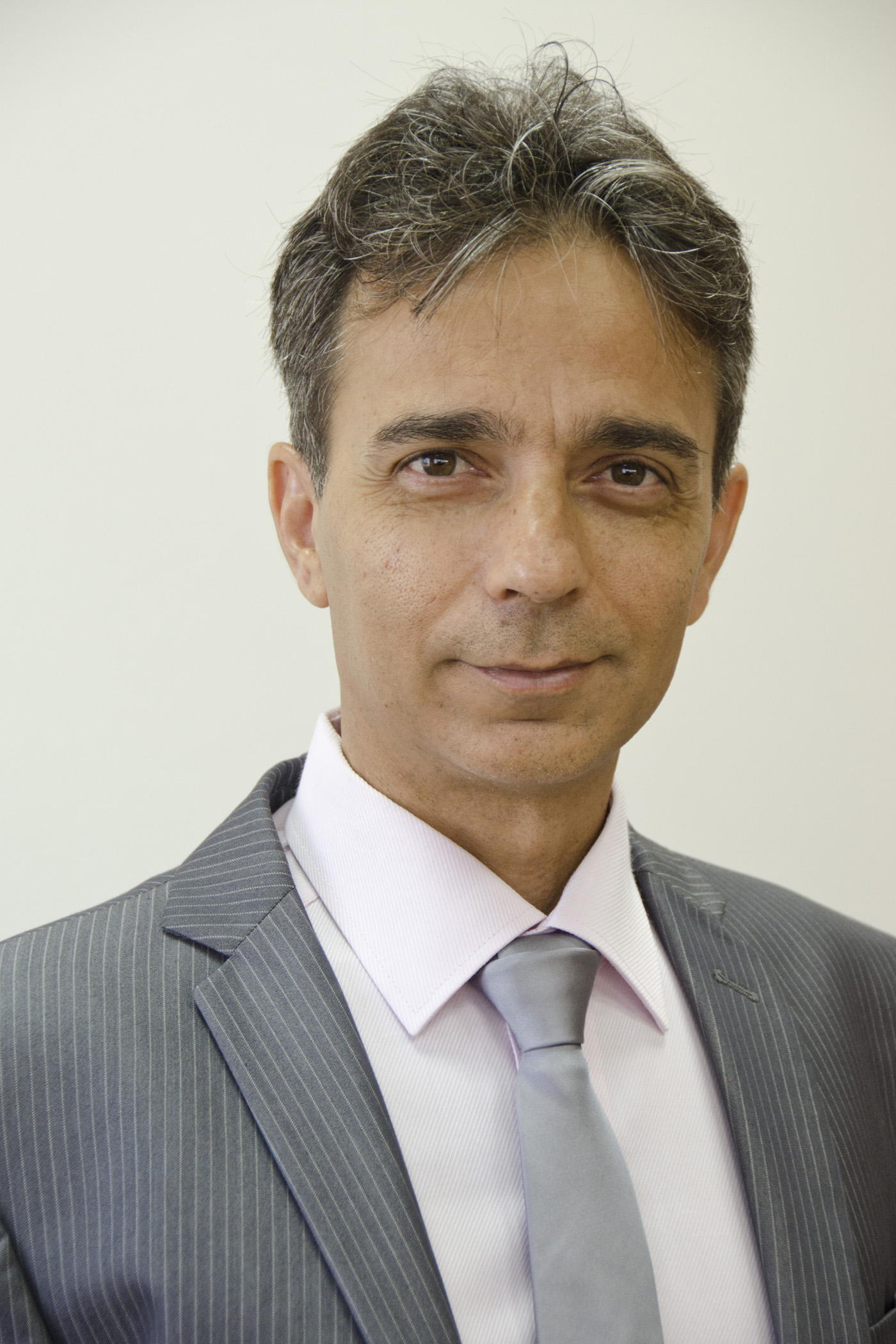

Yaron Oz (Hebrew: ירון עוז; born August 10, 1964, in Haifa) is full Professor of the School of Physics and Astronomy at Tel Aviv University.

== Biography ==
Oz completed summa cum laude his two B.Sc. degrees in electrical engineering and physics in 1987, his M.Sc. degree in 1989, and his Ph.D. degree in 1991 in physics at the Technion. He served as a research officer at the IDF in the years 1990-1995. After postdoctoral studies at University of California, Berkeley during 1996-1998, he joined CERN in Switzerland as staff member.

In 2001, he joined the School of Physics and Astronomy at Tel Aviv University as Professor. Recipient of the Alon Fellowship, he became incumbent of the Sackler Chair for Young Distinguished Scientists. He served as head of the School from 2006 until 2011, as Dean of the Faculty of Exact Sciences from 2011 until 2015 and as Rector of Tel Aviv University from 2015 until 2020.

His fields of research include high energy particle physics, quantum field theories and supersymmetry, classical and quantum gravity, superstrings, quantum information and computation. He is the incumbent of the Yuval Neeman Chair of Physics, won the Alexander von Humboldt Prize for Research and headed the Centre for Excellence in Research of the National Science Foundation, and is a member of the high energy I-Core Center. He has been a visiting professor at the College de France, École normale supérieure of Paris, Pierre and Marie Curie University, LMU Munich, University of Texas at Austin, and Simons institute in the USA.

Oz was the vice president of the Israel Physics Society in the years 2010-2013 and the president in the years 2013-2016; he is the scientific director of the Journal of High Energy Physics (JHEP) and a scientific editor of the Journal of Cosmology and Astroparticle Physics (JCAP); he is head of the National Committee of Pure and Applied Sciences of the National Academy of Sciences; and is a member of the National Committee of High Energy Physics. Oz is an external scientific member of the Max Planck Institute for Gravitational Physics (Albert Einstein Institute in Potsdam and Hannover) and the Max Planck Society. He is a member of the Institute for Advanced Study in Princeton and the head of Tel Aviv university Center for Quantum Science and Technology.
