= Michael Douglas (disambiguation) =

Michael Douglas (born 1944) is an American actor and film producer.

Michael Douglas may also refer to:

- Mike Douglas (1920–2006), American talk show host
- Mike Douglas (filmmaker) (born 1969), Canadian skier and filmmaker
- Michael Keaton (born 1951), actor whose birth name is Michael John Douglas
- Michael Crichton (1942–2008), author and screenwriter, used the pen name Michael Douglas
- Michael R. Douglas (born 1961), physicist prominent in string theory
- Michael Dutton Douglas (1945–1963), killed in a car accident involving future first lady Laura Bush
- Michael Douglas (skeleton racer) (born 1971), Canadian skeleton racer
- Michael Douglas (politician) (1940–1992), Dominican politician
- Michael L. Douglas (born 1944), chief justice of the Supreme Court of Nevada

== See also ==
- Mike Douglass (disambiguation)
