= Willy Fischler =

Belgian theoretical physicist

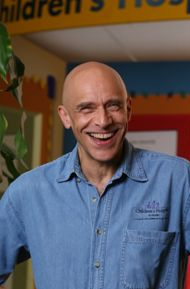
- Born: 1949 (age 76–77); Antwerp, Belgium
- Education: Universite Libre de Bruxelles (License and Ph.D.)
- Known for: Invisible axion, see Axion. M(atrix) theory. Gauge mediation, see Minimal Supersymmetric Standard Model; Fischler–Susskind holographic bound
- Scientific career
- Fields: Theoretical Physics
- Workplaces: University of Texas at Austin; University of Pennsylvania; Los Alamos National Laboratory; CERN
- Doctoral advisor: Robert Brout
- Doctoral students: David Berenstein; Xenia de la Ossa

Willy Fischler (born 1949 in Antwerp, Belgium) is a theoretical physicist. He is the Jane and Roland Blumberg Centennial Professor of Physics at the University of Texas at Austin, where he is affiliated with the Weinberg theory group. He is also a certified Flight Paramedic (FP-C) and was a Licensed Paramedic with Marble Falls Area EMS and a volunteer EMT with the Westlake Fire Department.

His contributions to physics include:

- Early computation of the force between heavy quarks.
- The DFSZ (Dine–Fischler–Srednicki–Zhitnisky) model, as a solution to the strong CP problem.
- The cosmological effects of the invisible axion (with Michael Dine) and its role as a candidate for dark matter.
- Pioneering work (with Michael Dine and Mark Srednicki) on the use of supersymmetry to solve outstanding problems in the Standard Model of particle physics.
- The first formulation of what became known as the "moduli problem in cosmology" (with G.D. Coughlan, Edward Kolb, Stuart Raby and Graham Ross).
- The Fischler–Susskind mechanism in string theory (with Leonard Susskind).
- The original formulation of the holographic entropy bound in the context of cosmology (with Leonard Susskind).
- The discovery of M(atrix) theory, or BFSS Matrix Theory. M(atrix) theory is an example of a gauge/gravity duality (with Tom Banks, Steve Shenker and Leonard Susskind).
- Black Hole production in colliders (with Tom Banks).
