= Michael R. Douglas =

American theoretical physicist

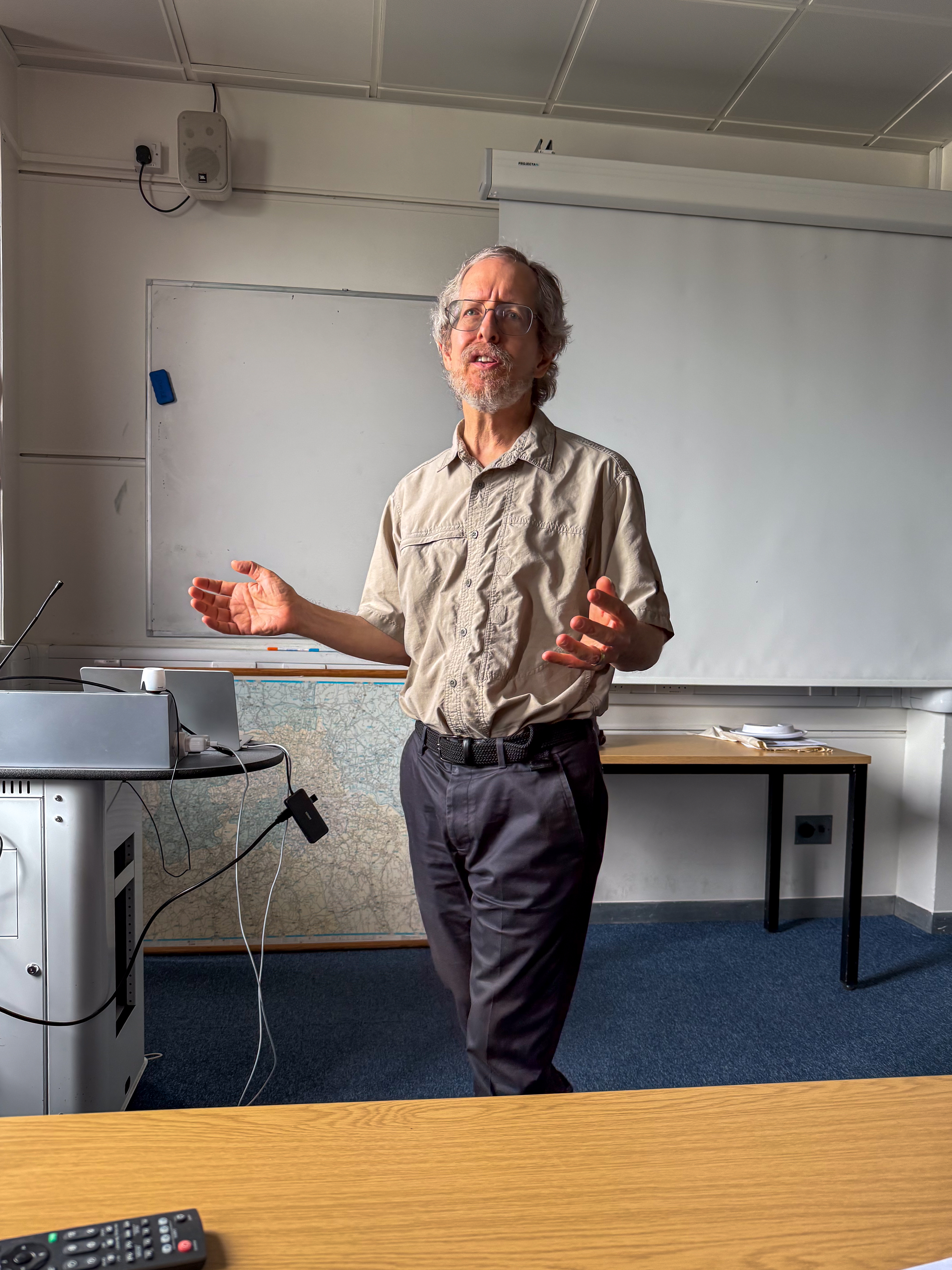
- Michael R. Douglas in 2025
- Born: November 19, 1961 (age 64); Baton Rouge, Louisiana
- Known for: String theory landscape Matrix models Noncommutative geometry in string theory Quiver Gauge Theory
- Spouse: Nina Ilieva Douglas
- Children: 2
- Scientific career
- Doctoral advisor: John H. Schwarz

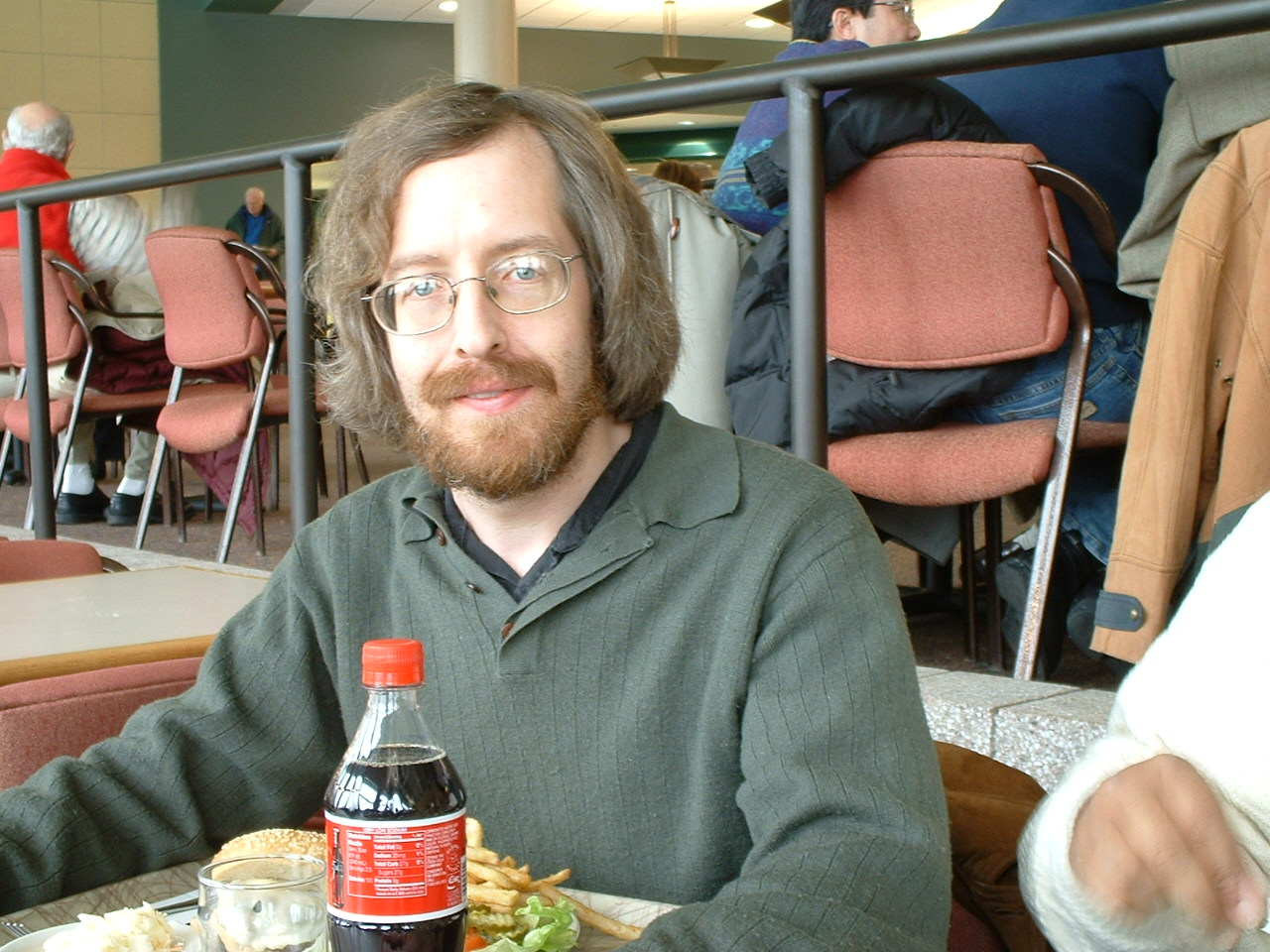
Michael Douglas at Rutgers University in 2003

Michael R. Douglas (born November 19, 1961) is an American theoretical physicist, best known for his work in string theory and mathematical physics.

== Biography ==
Douglas was born in Baton Rouge, Louisiana, the son of Nancy and Ronald G. Douglas, a mathematician specializing in operator algebras. He received his bachelor's degree in physics from Harvard University. He then went to Caltech and received a PhD in physics in 1988 under John Schwarz, one of the developers and leading researchers in superstring theory.

After completing his PhD, Douglas was a postdoc at the University of Chicago for one year, then moved to Rutgers University in 1989 with Dan Friedan and Steve Shenker to help start the New High Energy Theory Center (NHETC). He was promoted to assistant professor in 1990 but spent his first year visiting the École Normale Supérieure and the MIT Artificial Intelligence Laboratory. He became an associate professor at Rutgers in 1995, and left for a year in 1997–1998 to take up a permanent position at the Institut des Hautes Études Scientifiques. He then returned to Rutgers and in 2000 became the director of the NHETC. In 2008, Douglas moved from Rutgers to become the first permanent member of the Simons Center for Geometry and Physics, a research center at Stony Brook University. In 2012, Douglas left Stony Brook University to work for Renaissance Technologies, the famous quantitative hedge fund. He returned to academia in 2020 and is presently a long-term visitor at the Center of Mathematical Sciences and Applications at Harvard University, doing research on machine learning and its applications in scientific research.

Douglas is best known for the development of matrix models (the first nonperturbative formulations of string theory), for his work on Dirichlet branes and on noncommutative geometry in string theory, and for the development of the statistical approach to string phenomenology. He was on the team (led by Gerald J. Sussman) that built the Digital Orrery, a special-purpose computer for computations in celestial mechanics, and maintains an active interest in computer science. He is also very active in organizing schools and workshops, for example at Les Houches, Cargese, and the KITP Santa Barbara.

Douglas received the 2000 Sackler Prize in theoretical physics and has been a Gordon Moore Visiting Scholar at Caltech and a Clay Mathematics Institute Mathematical Emissary. In 2012 he became a fellow of the American Mathematical Society. He has a long association with the Institut des Hautes Études Scientifiques, as a Louis Michel Visiting Professor from 2000 to 2008, and as chairman and President of the Friends of IHES from 2013 to 2021.

Douglas is married and has two children. His wife, Nina Ilieva Douglas, is an artist. Her sculpture of Alexander Grothendieck is on permanent display at the IHES.
