= Matthew Kleban =

American theoretical physicist

- Education: Reed College (BA) University of California, Berkeley (MA) Stanford University (PhD)
- Known for: String theory Cosmology
- Scientific career
- Fields: Theoretical physics
- Workplaces: New York University; Institute for Advanced Study
- Doctoral advisor: Stephen Shenker

Matthew Benjamin Kleban is an American theoretical physicist who works on string theory and theoretical cosmology. He is the chair of the Department of Physics and a professor at New York University, former director of the Center for Cosmology and Particle Physics, and a former member of the Institute for Advanced Study. His contributions to physics include:

- The discovery of the first distinct signature of the black hole singularity in AdS/CFT (with Lukasz Fidkowski, Veronika Hubeny and Stephen Shenker)
- Pioneering work on the subtleties of very late-time cosmology in the presence of a positive cosmological constant, and the "Boltzmann brain" problem (with Lisa Dyson and Leonard Susskind)
- A determination of the effects of cosmic bubble collisions on the microwave background radiation and other cosmological observables.
- Work on the fundamental origin of cosmic inflation.
- Demonstrating that theories with multiple axion fields can account for many otherwise mysterious features of our universe.

== Selected works ==
- Fidkowski, Lukasz; Hubeny, Veronika; Kleban, Matthew; Shenker, Stephen (6 February 2004). "The Black Hole Singularity in AdS/CFT". Journal of High Energy Physics. 2004 (2): 014. arXiv:hep-th/0306170. Bibcode:2004JHEP...02..014F. doi:10.1088/1126-6708/2004/02/014. S2CID 119363210.
