= Wayne Brasler =

American journalism academic

Wayne M. Brasler (born October 28, 1940, in St. Louis, Missouri) was, for half a century, the journalism adviser for the University of Chicago Laboratory Schools' school paper, The Midway, and yearbook, U-Highlights.

== Awards ==
Brasler is a journalism teacher who has won many awards including the National High School Journalism Teacher of the Year award, awarded by the Dow Jones Newspaper Fund, along with the Gold Key award, given by the Columbia Scholastic Press Association and the Pioneer Award, from the National Scholastic Press Association. He also recently won the Gold Medal from the University of Missouri School of Journalism for his defense of student journalists' press rights and the Charles O'Malley Award for outstanding teaching and advising from the Columbia Scholastic Press Association. In 2001 he began an alumni association newspaper for Normandy High in St. Louis, a large, full-color publication. {Information verified by Wayne Brasler}

== Early life ==
Brasler grew up in Normandy, Missouri and attended Normandy High School, outside of St. Louis, Missouri. He attended Harris Teachers College and Junior College for two years, becoming managing editor of the campus newspaper his sophomore year. He proceeded to the University of Missouri School of Journalism, where he was copy editor of the student newspaper the Maneater, earning a BJ degree there before taking a job at the Jewish Post and Opinion in St. Louis. He later earned a master's degree in Language Arts at Northeastern Illinois University taking night and summer classes while still working six days and 80 hours a week. As a child in St. Louis, Brasler hung out at T.V. and radio stations as soon as he could ride streetcars alone and appeared on a children's radio show on KXLW in suburban Clayton. His mentor was the host of the show, who also taught kindergarten at his grade school. He originally planned a career in radio and television but at Normandy High decided he wanted to be a journalist and journalism teacher. He also had an extensive career as a singer, under the stage name Jim Andrews.

== Recent years ==
In 1996 the National Scholastic Press Association named a new high school journalism award after Brasler, the Brasler Prize, given to the most outstanding piece of work published in a high school newspaper every year. Recently the University of Missouri School of Journalism awarded him its prestigious gold medal for his highly vocal defense of student press rights and his history in scholastic journalism. Besides teaching journalism and advising publications for nearly half a century, Brasler has remained a working journalist. He also has written program notes for dozens of C.D. releases, edited several best-selling music books and music biographies, and wrote a soon-to-be-published autobiography and a biography for the singer Joni James. He formed a Joni James fan club in 1955 and still publishes the Joni James Newsletter, a full-color magazine. He is regarded as an expert on American popular music of the 20th century and has been consulted on numerous recording projects. He also is an expert on St. Louis County streetcar lines (his father was once a streetcar motorman) and has written numerous articles on them. In January 2015 he retired after 51 years at the University of Chicago Lab Schools to devote full-time to the publications he does for the Normandy Alumni Association in Normandy, Missouri; a magazine he does for the singer Joni James, a publication he started while in high school; and a monthly newsletter he does for a friend's transmission business, all of these projects non profit. The most recent issue of the Normandy Alumni Association newspaper, the Alumni Courier, had 56 11 x 17 pages and a print run of more than 1,500 copies.
