= University of Chicago Laboratory Schools =

Private secondary school in Illinois, US

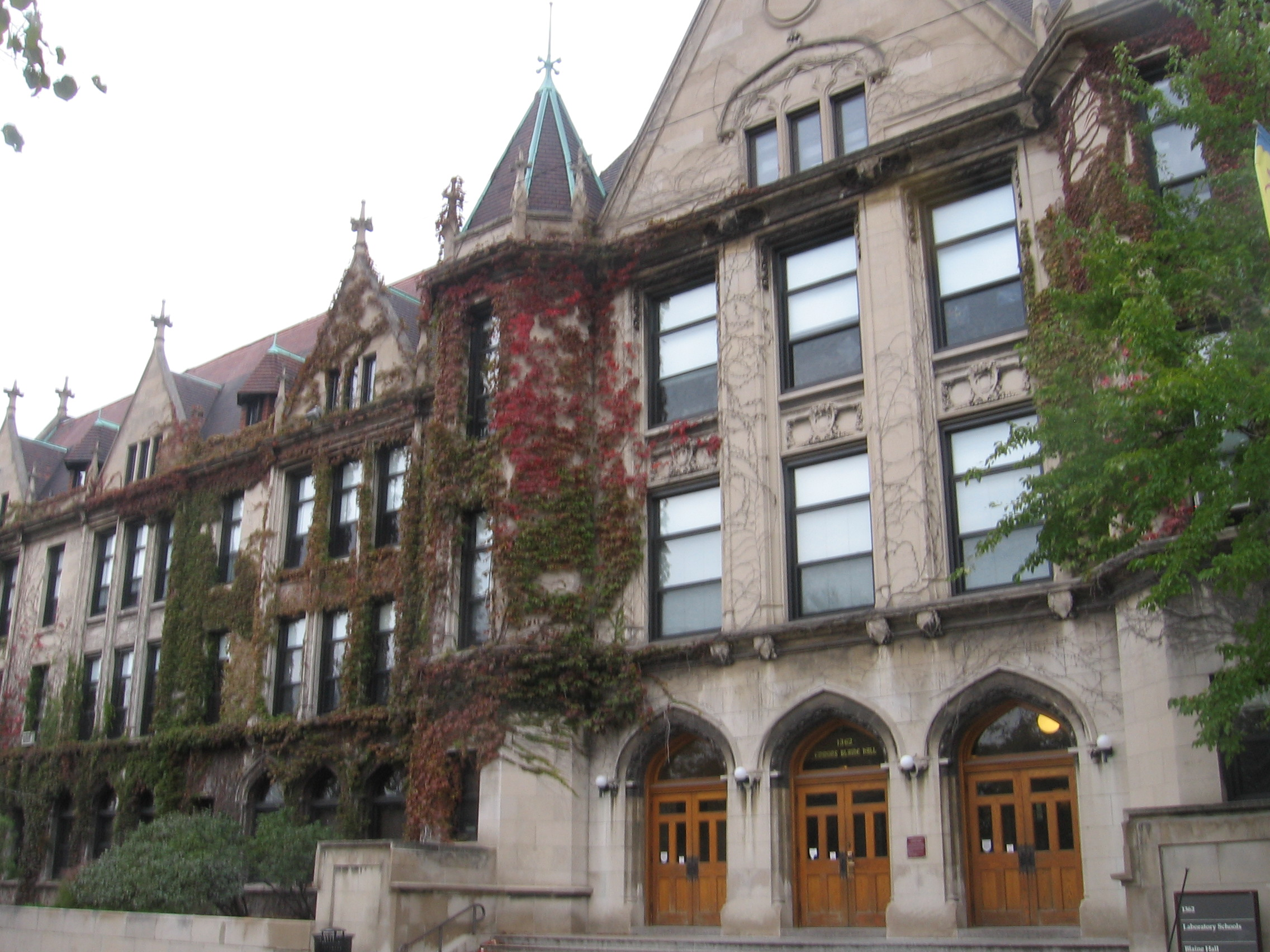

Location
- 1362 E. 59th St. Chicago, Illinois; United States
- Coordinates: 41.7886°N 87.5940°W

Information
- Type: Private Secondary
- Established: 1896
- Founder: John Dewey
- Interim Director: Ethan Bueno de Mesquita
- Grades: Nursery (age 3)–12
- Enrollment: 2,161 (2018–19)
- Mascot: Maroons
- Nickname: Lab, Lab schools, U-High (high school only)
- Newspaper: U-High Midway
- Yearbook: U-Highlights Yearbook
- Tuition: 2024-25: Nursery, Half Day - $29,334; Nursery, Full Day-Grade 5 - $40,686; Grades 6-8 - $42,834; Grades 9-12 - $44,592; Tuition for children of University of Chicago faculty and staff is half of listed amounts.
- Website: ucls.uchicago.edu

The University of Chicago Laboratory Schools (also known as Lab, Lab Schools, or U-High, abbreviated UCLS) is a private, co-educational, day pre-school and K-12 school affiliated with the University of Chicago in Chicago, Illinois. More than half of attending students have families who are affiliated with the University of Chicago as faculty, alumni, or through other employment.

== History ==
The Laboratory Schools were founded by American educator John Dewey in 1896 in the Hyde Park neighborhood of Chicago. Calvin Brainerd Cady was director of the music department under Dewey. The school began as a progressive educational institution that goes from nursery school through 12th grade.

The school was an attempt to create a unified school system from the kindergarten to university. Managed by the university's Department of Philosophy, Psychology, and Education, it served as a laboratory to test hypotheses and build on the knowledge about education because John Dewey, who became head of the department in 1894, wanted to test certain ideas of his.

In his book How We Think (1910), Dewey acknowledged the significant contributions made by his wife Alice Dewey to the school's early development.

== Campus ==
The Laboratory Schools consists of two interrelated campuses. The Historic Campus, located at 1362 East 59th Street, fills two full city blocks and is known for its Modern Gothic style architecture. It houses grades 3–12 (about 1,200 students) in five connected buildings: Blaine Hall (built in 1903), Belfield Towers (1904), Judd Hall (1931), the high school (built in 1960), the middle school (1993), and Gordon Parks Arts Hall (2015) which has 100 classrooms. Two connected gymnasiums also sit on this campus, Sunny Gym (built in 1929) and Kovler Gymnasium (built in 2000) and students have access to both Scammon Garden and Jackman Field. The Judd Hall underwent a massive exterior renovation in April 2021 to preserve the century-old façade.

In September 2013, Lab opened Earl Shapiro Hall on its new Early Childhood Campus located at 5800 S. Stony Island Avenue. This new building, designed by Valerio Dewalt Train and FGM Architects, is home to approximately 625 children in nursery through second grade. The building is named for Earl Shapiro, who graduated from Lab in 1956.

== Student body and academics ==
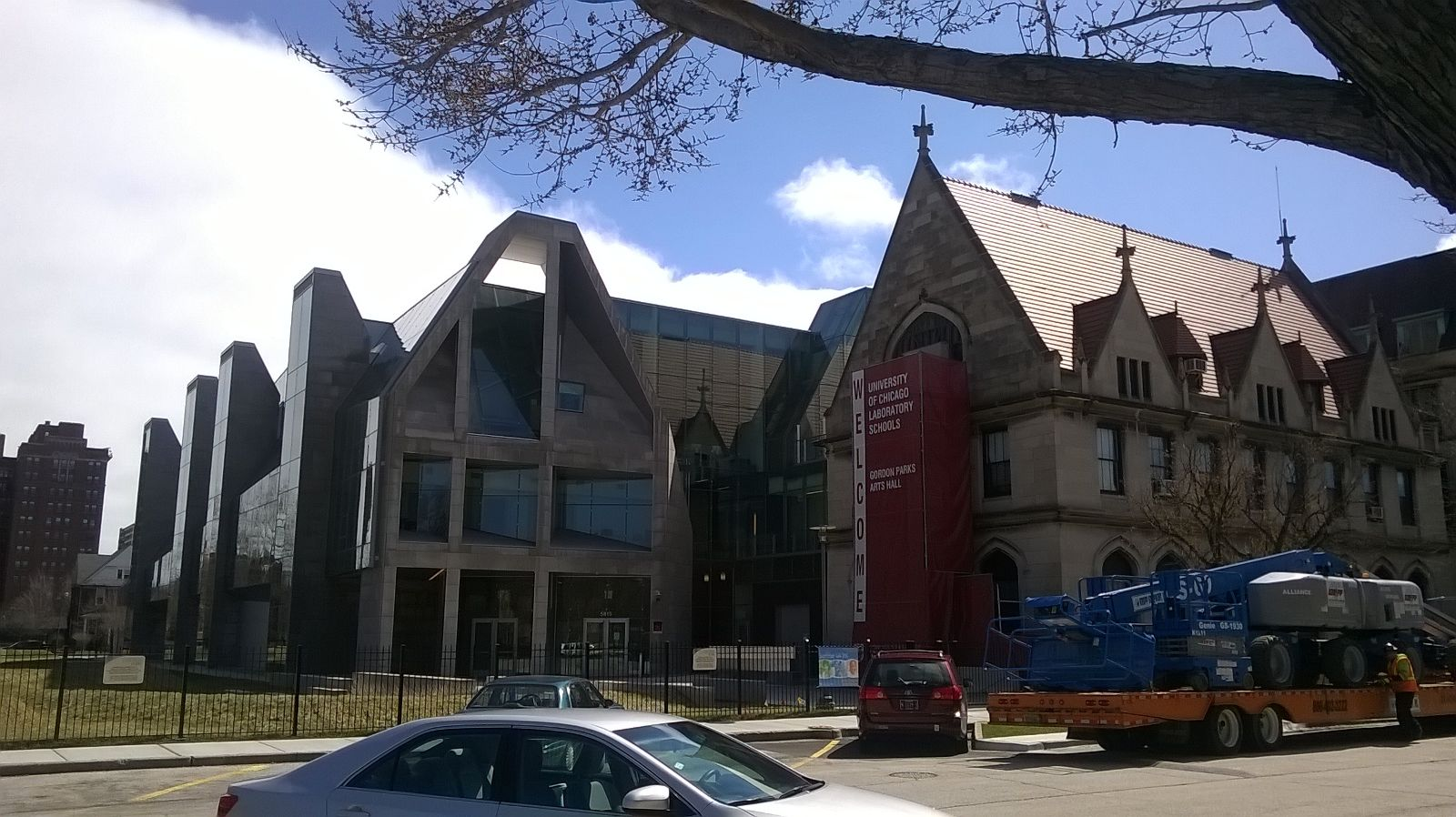
Laboratory Schools

The school has approximately 2,203 students in total from Pre-Kindergarten – Grade 12.

Today, the school is divided into a Nursery School (Pre-K and Kindergarten), Primary School (grades 1 and 2), Lower School (grades 3 through 5), Middle School (grades 6 through 8), and High School (grades 9 through 12). Many children begin in nursery school and continue through their high school graduation, and 75% of applications are for nursery school or 9th grade. The student/teacher ratio is 8:1.

According to the 2021 Lab Student Wellness Survey, 48% of girls and 25% of boys, for a total of 37% of students, identify as part of the LGBTQ community.

In 2007 The Wall Street Journal ranked the high school fourth in the nation for its record of sending graduates to 8 elite colleges including its parent university, University of Chicago.

U-High offers more than 150 different classes. All are college preparatory in nature and there are more than 30 Advanced Placement or Advanced Topic courses. High school students may also qualify to take classes at the University of Chicago at no extra charge, and about 20 do so each year. The average composite ACT score is 31.5. U-High uses a 4.0 unweighted GPA scale, does not rank students, and allows open course selection without academic tracking. The school maintains four separate libraries which collectively hold over 110,000 volumes.

== Extracurricular activities ==
High school students may choose from over 90 different clubs and activities. The high school math, science, and Model UN teams are regular contenders for – and winners of – state titles. The school's newspaper/website, The U-High Midway, and the yearbook, U-Highlights, regularly win state and national awards, as does its arts magazine, Renaissance. Other popular activities include theater, identity and affinity clubs, Student Council, policy debate, and Model UN. The Model UN team is consistently ranked among the top in the nation. In 2011, it was ranked the #2 High School Model UN team in the United States.

Organized by the Office of Alumni Relations Development, members of the student body at U-High are nominated by faculty to serve in the Maroon Key Society. The Maroon Key Society serve as ambassadors for the school, and they help provide tours to visiting alumni, potential students, and other guests to the school.

The high school's extracurricular activities occasionally make national and international news. For example, in 1990 then-Governor Thompson declared a "Matthew Headrick Day" and the US House made a proclamation when then-student Headrick appeared on talk shows including Today after winning the Regeneron Science Talent Search. In response to the award, the Chicago Tribune described the school as: "where being on the math team ... can actually enhance one's social status."

The Finance Club was founded in 2015 with more than $100,000 of donated funds to invest.

== Athletics ==
The 2019 boys soccer team won the IHSA 1A state championship.

The 2019 girls tennis team won the IHSA 1A state championship, becoming the first U-High girls team to win a state championship. The 2021 girls tennis team was also 1A state champion, and the team won the 1A state championship again in 2023.

The boys tennis team won the 1A state championship in 2018 and again in 2024, making the 2023-24 school year the first time in school history that both girls and boys tennis teams won state championships in the same academic year.

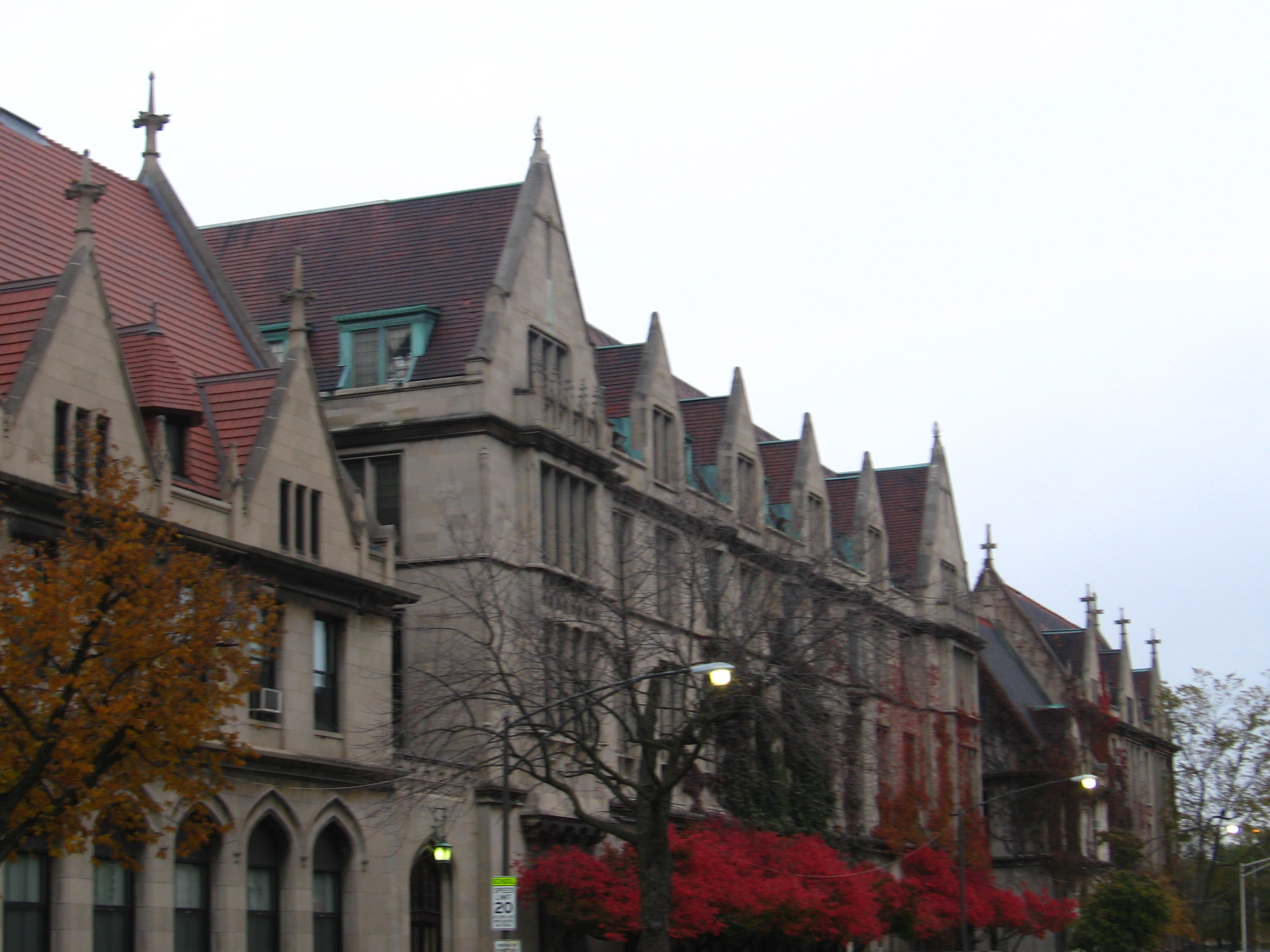
Judd Hall as visible from the adjacent Charles M. Harper Center.

== Notable teachers ==
- Eight Lab teachers have received Chicago's prestigious Golden Apple Award—more than from any other school in the city. (2009 Christina Hayward; 2007 David Derbes; 2004 Rosa McCullagh; 1994 Michael (Spike) Wilson; 1992 Jan Yourist; 1989 Catharine Bell; 1987 Hanna Goldschmidt; 1986 Randy Fowler.) Others have received the Kohl McCormick Early Childhood Teaching Award.
- Mima Maxey (1885–1965) and Marjorie Fay (1893–1977) taught Latin at Lab in the 1930s. Evan Dutmer argues that their teaching approach, based on reading without formal grammatical instruction, was "virtually without precedent in American Latin education" and anticipated the theory of comprehensible input as used later in language education.
- A MacArthur “genius” award and the Erikson Institute Award for Service to Children are among the achievements of author/teacher Vivian Paley, who spent most of her career at Lab.
- Created and funded in honor of Zena Sutherland (a former U. of C. faculty member and still considered among the world's most influential scholars of young people's literature), the annual Sutherland Award for Excellence in Children's Literature is one of the only student-selected book awards in the United States.
- Lab teachers contributed to the University of Chicago School Mathematics Project, the largest university-based mathematics curriculum project in the country. Their results included the nationally acclaimed Everyday Mathematics texts for elementary school students and Transition Mathematics, a middle school pre-algebra text.
- Blue Balliett, author of Chasing Vermeer, The Wright Three, and The Calder Game, based her children's mysteries on her experiences teaching students at Lab.
