= Tom Banks (physicist) =

American physicist

- Born: April 19, 1949 (age 77); New York City
- Education: MIT
- Known for: M(atrix) Theory; Banks–Zaks fixed point
- Scientific career
- Fields: Physics
- Workplaces: Rutgers; University of California, Santa Cruz
- Doctoral advisor: Carl M. Bender
- Doctoral students: Lubos Motl

Thomas Israel Banks (born April 19, 1949 in New York City) is a theoretical physicist and professor at Rutgers University and University of California, Santa Cruz.

== Work ==
Banks' work centers around string theory and its applications to high energy particle physics and cosmology. He received his Ph.D. in physics from the Massachusetts Institute of Technology in 1973. From 1973 to 1977 he was a post doctorate at Tel Aviv University and stayed on first as a lecturer and then as a professor until 1986. He was several times a visiting scholar at the Institute for Advanced Study in Princeton (1976–78, 1983–84, 2010).

Along with Willy Fischler, Stephen Shenker, and Leonard Susskind, he is one of the four originators of M(atrix) theory, or BFSS Matrix Theory, an attempt to formulate M theory in a nonperturbative manner. Banks proposed a conjecture known as asymptotic darkness—it posits that the physics above the Planck scale is dominated by black hole production. He has often criticized the widely held assumption in the string theory community that background spacetimes with different asymptotics can represent different vacua states of the same theory of quantum gravity. Rather, Banks argues that different asymptotics correspond to different models of quantum gravity. Many of his arguments for this and other ideas are contained in his paper "A Critique of Pure String Theory: Heterodox Opinions of Diverse Dimensions." published in 2003.
