= Lisa Dyson =

American scientist and entrepreneur

- Education: Massachusetts Institute of Technology; Imperial College London; Brandeis University
- Scientific career
- Fields: Physics; biotechnology
- Workplaces: Stanford University; University of California, Berkeley; University of California, San Francisco; Princeton University
- Thesis: Three Lessons in Causality: What String Theory Has to Say About Naked Singularities, Time Travel and Horizon Complementarity (2004)
- Doctoral advisor: Leonard Susskind

Lisa Dyson is an American scientist, physicist, and entrepreneur who is the founder and CEO of Air Protein, a food tech company 'reinventing how food is produced using elements of the air'. As one of the companies recognized by the World Economic Forum, Air Protein aims to help sustainably and nutritiously feed 10 billion people by 2050.

Dyson's background includes a variety of business and scientific accomplishments, which have led to raising over $100 million across the two companies she co-founded along with John Reed. She has a PhD in theoretical physics from MIT and has conducted research at the University of California, Berkeley, the Lawrence National Laboratory, Stanford University, University of California San Francisco, and Princeton University. In addition, she has worked as a strategy management consultant at the Boston Consulting Group for Fortune 500 companies, identifying solutions in areas of operations, cost management, market expansion, and post-merger integration. In 2016, her experience gained the attention of a global audience as she took the TED Stage to discuss how a forgotten Space Age technology could change how we grow food, reaching over 1.5 million people.

Lisa has received numerous awards and recognition, including being named as one of the 100 Most Creative People from Fast Company 2017, one of the Top 100 Female Founders by Inc Magazine 2019, and a 2024 Bloomberg's New Economy Catalyst. Among the recognition the companies she co-founded have received include 2024's DoD Distributed Bioindustrial Manufacturing Program Award, 2024 America's #1 FoodTech Company from TIME and Statista, and 2020's World Economic Forum Technology Pioneer.

Dyson is also the co-founder of Kiverdi, a biotechnology company with a mission to deliver a true circular economy and transform the future of production by making the raw materials for everyday products (e.g., biodegradable plastics, hydrocarbons, fibers) from carbon dioxide.

== Early life and education ==
Dyson grew up in Southern California and completed degrees in physics and mathematics at Brandeis University in 1997. After meeting several physics professors at Brandeis, she became more interested in pursuing physics research. She was a Fulbright Scholar at Imperial College London in 1998, where she studied quantum field theory and earned a Masters of Science degree in physics.

Dyson earned her PhD at the MIT Center for Theoretical Physics at the Massachusetts Institute of Technology (MIT) in 2004, working with Leonard Susskind on quantum gravity, general relativity, and string theory. She also worked with Susskind and Matthew Kleban on the Boltzmann brain problem, publishing on the topic in the Journal of High Energy Physics in 2002. She was the fourth black woman to earn a PhD in theoretical high-energy physics.

For her PhD thesis, Dyson conducted a study explaining how string theory can be used to talk about general relativity and theoretical physics concepts like naked singularities, time travel, and horizon complementarity. For instance, in her analysis of time travel, she explained how general relativity allows the possibility of time travel, but such an event would introduce geometries that violate causality, a fundamental physical law. However, she then explained that there are causality-violating regions that would allow for time travel but they cannot be constructed due to the stringy effects in string theory. In short, Dyson's work tackled the complex relationship between fundamental physics principles and the theoretical consequences arising from string theory.

== Career ==
Dyson conducted research at the University of California, Berkeley, Lawrence Berkeley National Laboratory, Stanford University, the University of California San Francisco, and Princeton University. She also worked as a management consultant at Boston Consulting Group, where she advised multi-national companies on effective strategies to run their businesses. She has worked in the chemical, energy, transportation, travel, automotive, packaging, and telecommunications industries.

In 2005, Dyson volunteered in New Orleans following Hurricane Katrina, an experience she later cited as influential in her decision to focus on creating technology for sustainable ways of living.

In 2008, along with John Reed, she began working on climate technologies. In 2011, they raised seed capital from Primera Capital for Kiverdi, a biotechnology company that they founded that uses microbes to turn carbon dioxide and carbon-rich waste, such as wood and agricultural residue, into alternative fuels, protein replacements, oils, and biodegradable materials for applications such as food and agriculture. The technology is a space-age technology based on ideas by NASA in the 1960s and 1970s, for astronauts to use microbes called hydrogenotrophs to convert carbon dioxide in exhaled breath into nutrients. They started to grow the microbes in her lab, working with manufacturers to scale up their technology. In 2011 they received their first grant from the California Energy Commission and later received grants from the U.S. Department of Energy and formed partnerships with industrial manufacturers. Kiverdi now has over 40 patents granted or pending. Dyson and Reed went on to create Air Protein, which was established to focus on sustainable food production. Dyson is the CEO of Air Protein, which has been valued at more than $100 million.

== Media and speaking appearances ==
She has delivered several TED talks, including "Turning CO_{2} into Oil" at TEDxFulbright in May 2014 and "A Forgotten Space Age Technology Could Change How We Grow Food" in July 2016, which has been viewed over one million times. She has spoken about carbon recycling, and appeared on the PBS program Nova "Decoding the Weather Machine" in April 2018.Dyson also made an appearance as the opening keynote speaker in NYC Climate Week 2026, an event that aims to implement up to date policies affecting pollution and climate change.

== Honors and awards ==
- 2012 Sustainable Biofuels Award for a "Leader in Bio-based Chemical Industry", World Biofuels Markets
- 2012 grant of $750,000 for Research, Demonstration, and Development program for its "efforts to develop beneficial uses of carbon dioxide" and was selected through competitive peer-review as an industrial user at the U.S. Department of Energy's Molecular Foundry, California Energy Commission
- 2013 "40 Under 40", San Francisco Business Times
- 2014 Entrepreneurship Award, U.S. Clean Energy Education & Empowerment (C3E) Initiative
- 2015 "One of the Most Influential Women in the Bay Area", San Francisco Business Times
- 2016 "One of the Most Influential Women in the Bay Area", San Francisco Business Times
- 2017 One of the Most Creative People in Business, Fast Company
- 2018 Women in Natural Sciences Award, "which honors an outstanding female innovator in the STEM field, whose visionary contributions in science have made a positive impact on the world", Academy of Natural Science at Drexel University
- 2019 Top 100 Female Founders, Inc. Magazine
- 2021 Female Thought Leader of the Year, Stevie Awards for Women in Business
- 2021 Most Innovative Woman of the Year - Technology, Stevie Awards for Women in Business
- 2022 Most Influential Women in Bay Area Business, San Francisco Business Times
- 2023 Power 100, San Francisco Business Times
- 2023 Lewis Latimer Fellow, The Edison Awards
- Forever Influential Honor Roll, San Francisco Business Times
