= Gary Horowitz =

American theoretical physicist (born 1955)

Gary T. Horowitz (born April 14, 1955 in Washington, D.C.) is an American theoretical physicist who works on string theory and quantum gravity.

== Biography ==
Horowitz studied at Princeton University (Bachelor 1976) and obtained his Ph.D. in 1979 at the University of Chicago with Robert Geroch. Subsequently, he was a post-doc at the University of California, Santa Barbara and Oxford University (as a NATO Fellow). In 1981-1983 he worked as an Einstein Fellow at the Institute for Advanced Study. He became an assistant professor in 1983, associate professor in 1986, and finally professor in 1990 at the University of California at Santa Barbara.

Horowitz investigates gravitational phenomena, such as black holes, in string theory. In the 1990s, he worked with, among others, Andrew Strominger and Joseph Polchinski showing that string theory provides a description of the quantum microstates of certain black holes (following earlier work of Strominger and Cumrun Vafa).

In 1985 Horowitz published an influential paper with Philip Candelas, Andrew Strominger and Edward Witten on the compactification of superstrings in Calabi-Yau spaces. In the early 1990s, Horowitz and Strominger found black brane solutions in string theory. Horowitz also works on the AdS/CFT correspondence and (together with Sean Hartnoll and Chris Herzog) discovered holographic superconductors.

In 1982 Horowitz and M. Perry won first prize in the Gravity Research Foundation essay competition. From 1985 to 1989 he was a Sloan Fellow. In 1993 he was awarded the Xanthopoulos Prize. He has been a Fellow of the American Physical Society since 2001, Member of the National Academy of Sciences since 2010, and Fellow of the American Academy of Arts and Sciences since 2013. In 2025 he was awarded the Dirac Medal (ICTP).

== Selected papers ==
- Horowitz, Gary T. (2005). "Spacetime in string theory". New Journal of Physics. 7 (1): 201. arXiv:gr-qc/0410049. Bibcode:2005NJPh....7..201H. doi:10.1088/1367-2630/7/1/201. S2CID 14482408.
- Horowitz, Gary T. (2000). "Quantum Gravity at the Turn of the Millennium". arXiv:gr-qc/0011089.
- Horowitz, Gary T.; Hubeny, Veronika E. (2000). "Quasinormal modes of AdS black holes and the approach to thermal equilibrium". Physical Review D. 62 (2) 024027. arXiv:hep-th/9909056. Bibcode:2000PhRvD..62b4027H. doi:10.1103/PhysRevD.62.024027. S2CID 15182652.
- Horowitz, Gary T.; Teukolsky, Saul A. (1999). "Black holes". Reviews of Modern Physics. 71 (2): S180 – S186. arXiv:gr-qc/9808035. Bibcode:1999RvMPS..71..180H. doi:10.1103/RevModPhys.71.S180. S2CID 119326122.
- Horowitz, Gary T. (1997). "Quantum States of Black Holes". arXiv:gr-qc/9704072.
- Horowitz, Gary T.; Polchinski, Joseph (2006). "Gauge/Gravity duality". arXiv:gr-qc/0602037.
