= Vivian Paley =

American teacher and researcher (1929–2019)

- Born: Vivian Gussin Paley; January 25, 1929; Chicago, Illinois
- Died: July 26, 2019 (aged 90)
- Occupations: Teacher; education researcher
- Awards: 1989 MacArthur Fellowship

Academic background
- Education: University of Chicago; Newcomb College; Hofstra University

Academic work
- Discipline: Early childhood learning
- Institutions: University of Chicago Laboratory Schools

Vivian Gussin Paley (January 25, 1929 – July 26, 2019) was an American pre-school and kindergarten teacher and early childhood education researcher. She taught and did most of her research at the University of Chicago Laboratory Schools and was the recipient of a MacArthur Fellowship, as well as the author of numerous books.

== Early career ==
Vivan Paley was born in Chicago, Illinois. After receiving her Ph.B. from the University of Chicago in 1947, and a B.A. in Psychology from Newcomb College in 1950, she began her teaching career in New Orleans in the 1950s, and later in Great Neck, New York. It was during her time teaching in New Orleans that she began to reflect on some of the ways in which childhood learning at the time was being choked by an overemphasis on strict learning boundaries (e.g., that children could only be allowed to learn how to write in capital letters, not lower-case) and perfunctory memorization.

While teaching in Great Neck, she began to reflect on how play can be the "most usable context" for interaction and intellectual growth among kindergartners. This view, however, flew in the face of what many early education teachers thought at the time, that with the rise of television's easily accessible portrayals of violence, children were becoming too intense and restless, and if anything, needed more vigilant limits on playtime. Many of her insights during this time laid the foundation for her later writings.

After receiving her M.A. from Hofstra University in 1962, she returned to Chicago, where she dedicated the rest of her teaching career. It was during the 1970s that she began writing the books on early childhood learning (see below) which have made her so well regarded in early education circles. Despite her status today, however, she described the first 13 years of her teaching career as being an "uninspired and uninspiring teacher."

== Research ==
Throughout her career, Paley wrote numerous books containing her observations of and reflections about her classroom and students, primarily those at the University of Chicago Laboratory Schools where she taught pre-school and kindergarten for many years. To collect her data, Paley made audio-recordings of her classrooms so that she could listen to and analyze the interactions that occurred. In so doing, she would often hear private conversations between children that would help her think about the unique way young children communicate with other young children.

Generally, each of her books contains one driving theme. For example, You Can’t Say You Can’t Play focuses on the desire of some students to exclude others during classroom playtime. Paley imposed a rule that children could not exclude other children from play, and discusses the importance of fairness in the classroom. In her books White Teacher and Kwanzaa and Me, Paley explores issues of multiculturalism within the classroom. In particular, she reflects on her own experiences as a white teacher of children of color and analyzes how she can best support and promote a racially diverse classroom.

Many educators believe that Paley's biggest legacy is in the area of storytelling and fantasy play, which she directly addresses in her books A Child’s Work: The Importance of Fantasy Play, The Boy Who Would Be a Helicopter, Bad Guys Don’t Have Birthdays: Fantasy Play at Four. Paley argues in these and other works that storytelling and fantasy play can significantly impact a child's academic and social growth. They help young children make sense of the world around them, adapt to the classroom, develop language, and collaborate with peers. Some critics of the federal No Child Left Behind Act point to Paley's research as evidence that learning and developing can take place using storytelling and other means, which should be used in lieu of, or in addition to, the NCLB-mandated direct instruction and teacher-led activities.

Vivian Gussin Paley was patron to MakeBelieve Arts. MakeBelieve Arts have an Early Years strand which is dedicated to Paleys work called Helicopter Stories: Letting Imagination Fly. This grew out of Vivian Gussin Paley's book The Boy Who Would Be a Helicopter (published 1990 Harvard University Press). After studying Vivian's work and visiting her in America, artistic director, Trisha Lee began pioneering the approach in the UK.

== Published works ==
- White Teacher (1979). 2009, Second Edition, with a New Preface, ISBN 0674041798
- Wally's Stories (1981)
- Mollie is Three: Growing Up in School (1988) ISBN 978-0-226-64494-3
- Bad Guys Don't Have Birthdays: Fantasy Play at Four (1988) ISBN 978-0-226-64496-7
- The Boy Who Would Be A Helicopter (1991)
- You Can't Say You Can't Play (1993)
- Kwanzaa and Me: A Teacher's Story (1995)
- The Girl With the Brown Crayon (1997)
- The Kindness of Children (1999)
- In Mrs. Tully's Room: A Child-Care Portrait (2001)
- A Child's Work: The Importance of Fantasy Play (2004) ISBN 978-0-226-64489-9
- The Boy on the Beach: Building Community through Play (2010) ISBN 978-0-226-64503-2
- Boys and Girls: Superheroes in the Doll Corner (New Edition, 2014) ISBN 978-0-226-13010-1

== Awards ==
Vivian Paley received a MacArthur Fellowship (Genius Grant) in 1989 in recognition of her books about young children, the Erikson Institute Award for Service to Children in 1987, the American Book Award for Lifetime Achievement from the Before Columbus Foundation in 1998, and the John Dewey Society's Outstanding Achievement Award in 2000. In 1997, Paley's book, The Girl With the Brown Crayon was awarded the Harvard University Press Virginia and Warren Stone Prize for the outstanding book about education and Society. In 1999, the National Council of Teachers of English awarded her the David H. Russell Award for Distinguished Teaching in English, also for The Girl With the Brown Crayon. In 2004, Paley was named Outstanding Educator by the National Council of Teachers of English.
