= University of Chicago School Mathematics Project =

The University of Chicago School Mathematics Project (UCSMP) is a multi-faceted project of the University of Chicago in the United States, intended to improve competency in mathematics in the United States by elevating educational standards for children in elementary and secondary schools.

== Overview ==
The UCSMP supports educators by supplying training materials to them and offering a comprehensive mathematics curriculum at all levels of primary and secondary education. It seeks to bring international strengths into the United States, translating non-English math textbooks for English students and sponsoring international conferences on the subject of math education. Launched in 1983 with the aid of a six-year grant from Amoco, the UCSMP is used throughout the United States.

UCSMP developed Everyday Mathematics, a pre-K and elementary school mathematics curriculum.

== UCSMP publishers ==
- McGraw-Hill (K-6 Materials) (Pre-K is by McGraw-Hill Education ) (Pre-K Materials)
- Wright Group-McGraw-Hill (6-12 Materials)
- American Mathematical Society (Translations of Foreign Texts)

== See also ==
- Zalman Usiskin
