= Zalman Usiskin =

American mathematician

Zalman Usiskin is an educator best known as the Director of the University of Chicago School Mathematics Project.

He was born to Nathan and Esther Usiskin.

A faculty member since 1969, he also has taught junior and senior high-school mathematics and has authored and co-authored many textbooks, including a six-volume series used as part of the University School Mathematics Project secondary curriculum. In recognition of his work, he has received a Lifetime Achievement Award from the National Council of Teachers of Mathematics.

Usiskin's doctoral dissertation in mathematical education at the University of Michigan involved the field testing of his book, Geometry: A Transformation Approach, which was written with Arthur Coxford. This book has greatly influenced the way geometry is taught in many American high schools, according to the NCTM citation. With the founding of UCSMP in 1983, he became Director of the secondary component and has been the project's overall Director since 1987. The University School Mathematics Project has grown to become the nation's largest university-based curriculum project for kindergarten through 12th-grade mathematics, with several million students using its elementary and secondary textbooks and other materials.
