= Everyday Mathematics =

1998–present curriculum series

Everyday Mathematics is a pre-K and elementary school mathematics curriculum, developed by the University of Chicago School Mathematics Project (not to be confused with the University of Chicago School of Mathematics). The program, now published by McGraw-Hill Education, has sparked debate.

== History ==
Everyday Mathematics curriculum was developed by the University of Chicago School Math Project (or UCSMP) which was founded in 1983. Work on it started in the summer of 1985. The 1st edition was released in 1988–1996 and the 2nd in 1996–2002. A third edition was released in 2007 and a fourth in 2014–2015. A new one was released in 2020, dropping Pre-K. For Pre-K, schools use a 2012 Pre-K version.

== Curriculum structure ==
Below is an outline of the components of EM as they are generally seen throughout the curriculum.

Lessons

A typical lesson outlined in one of the teacher's manuals includes three parts

- Teaching the Lesson—Provides main instructional activities for the lesson.
- Ongoing Learning and Practice—Supports previously introduced concepts and skills; essential for maintaining skills.
- Differentiation Options—Includes options for supporting the needs of all students; usually an extension of Part 1, Teaching the Lesson.

Daily Routines

Every day, there are certain things that each EM lesson requires the student to do routinely. These components can be dispersed throughout the day or they can be part of the main math lesson.

- Math Messages—These are problems, displayed in a manner chosen by the teacher, that students complete before the lesson and then discuss as an opener to the main lesson.
- Mental Math and Reflexes—These are brief (no longer than 5 min) sessions "…designed to strengthen children's number sense and to review and advance essential basic skills…" (Program Components 2003).
- Math Boxes—These are pages intended to have students routinely practice problems independently.
- Home Links—Everyday homework is sent home. They are called Home Links. They are meant to reinforce instruction as well as connect home to the work at school.

Supplemental Aspects

Beyond the components already listed, there are supplemental resources to the program. The two most common are games and explorations.

- Games— "…Everyday Mathematics sees games as enjoyable ways to practice number skills, especially those that help children develop fact power…" (Program Components 2003). Therefore, authors of the series have interwoven games throughout daily lessons and activities.

== Scientific support for the curriculum ==
What Works Clearinghouse (WWC) reviewed the evidence in support of the Everyday Mathematics program. Of the 61 pieces of evidence submitted by the publisher, 57 did not meet the WWC minimum standards for scientific evidence, four met evidence standards with reservations, and one of those four showed a statistically significant positive effect. Based on the four studies considered, the WWC gave Everyday Math a rating of "Potentially Positive Effect" with the four studies showing a mean improvement in elementary math achievement (versus unspecified alternative programs) of 6 percentile rank points with a range of −7 to +14 percentile rank points, on a scale from −50 to +50.

== Criticism ==
After the first edition was released, it became part of a nationwide controversy over reform mathematics. In October 1999, US Department of Education issued a report labeling Everyday Mathematics one of five "promising" new math programs.

The debate has continued at the state and local level as school districts across the country consider the adoption of Everyday Math. Two states where the controversy has attracted national attention are California and Texas. California has one of the most rigorous textbook adoption processes and in January 2001 rejected Everyday Mathematics for failing to meet state content standards. Everyday Math stayed off the California textbook lists until 2007 when the publisher released a California version of the 3rd edition that is supplemented with more traditional arithmetic, reigniting debate at the local level. In late 2007, the Texas State Board of Education took the unusual step of rejecting the 3rd edition of Everyday Math after earlier editions had been in use in more than 70 districts across the state. The fact that they singled out Everyday Math while approving all 162 other books and educational materials raised questions about the board's legal powers. The state of Texas dropped Everyday Mathematics, saying it was leaving public school graduates unprepared for college.

== Notes ==
Additional references

- About Everyday Mathematics: Research & Development. (2003) Retrieved June 27, 2006.
- Bas, Braams. (2003) Spiraling Through UCSMP Everyday Mathematics. Retrieved June 27, 2006.
- Current Curriculum: About Everyday Mathematics. (2002) Retrieved June 27, 2006.
- Knight, Michelle. (2005) Everyday Math Has Its Proponents. Retrieved June 27, 2006.
- Foundations for Success, The Final Report of the National Mathematics Advisory Panel (2008) U.S. Department of Education. Retrieved April 19, 2009
- Johnson, Jerry. (2000) Teaching and Learning Mathematics: Using Research to Shift from “Yesterday” Mind to “Tomorrow” Mind Archived 2007-01-29 at the Wayback Machine. Retrieved June 27, 2006.
- Program Components for Grades 1-6. (2003) Retrieved June 27, 2006.
- University of Chicago School Mathematics Project. (2005) . Retrieved June 29, 2006.
- Wertheimer, Richard. (2002) Forum: Making It All Add Up. Retrieved June 29, 2006.
