= Cheb Balowski =

Spanish musical group

Cheb Balowski is a Spanish musical group that mixes styles such as ska, reggae, pachanga, rumba, and ragga. Formed in Barcelona in 2000, the band has eleven members, and their albums mix songs sung in Spanish, Catalan, and Arabic.

== Discography ==
- Bartzeloona (2001)
- Potiner (2003)
- Plou Plom (Musiqueta que enamora) (2005)
