= Daniel Friedan =

American physicist (born 1948)

- Born: Daniel Harry Friedan; October 3, 1948 (age 77); New York City, US
- Occupation: Theoretical physicist at Rutgers University
- Known for: String theory, two-dimensional conformal field theory, quantum gravity
- Spouse: Ragnheiður Guðmundsdóttir
- Children: 3
- Mother: Betty Friedan
- Awards: Lars Onsager Prize (2010)

Daniel Harry Friedan (born October 3, 1948) is an American theoretical physicist and a professor at Rutgers University. He is one of three children of the feminist author and activist Betty Friedan.

== Biography ==
=== Education and career ===
Friedan earned his Ph.D. from the University of California, Berkeley in 1980 and was named a MacArthur Fellow in 1987.

In 1979, he showed that the equations of motions of string theory, which are generalizations of the Einstein equations of general relativity, emerge from the renormalization group equations for the two-dimensional field theory.

Friedan has worked in string theory and condensed matter theory, specializing in (1 + 1)-dimensional systems. His current research focuses on applications to quantum computers.

Friedan received the 2010 Lars Onsager Prize from the American Physical Society "for seminal work on the classification and characterization of two-dimensional unitary conformal field theories of critical states." He currently teaches at Rutgers University.

== Personal life ==
Daniel is married to an Icelandic physics teacher, Ragnheiður Guðmundsdóttir. They have two daughters and one son together.
