= Journal of High Energy Physics =

- Discipline: Particle physics
- Language: English
- Edited by: Yaron Oz

Publication details
- History: 1997–present
- Publisher: Springer Science+Business Media on behalf of the Scuola Internazionale Superiore di Studi Avanzati
- Frequency: Monthly
- Open access: Yes
- License: Creative Commons Attribution 4.0 International Licence
- Impact factor: 5.5 (2024)

Standard abbreviations
- ISO 4: J. High Energy Phys.

Indexing
- CODEN: JHEPAB
- ISSN: 1126-6708 (print); 1029-8479 (web)
- LCCN: sn98052202
- OCLC no.: 637672365

Links
- Journal homepage; Online archive; Access to content before 2010

The Journal of High Energy Physics is a monthly peer-reviewed open access scientific journal covering the field of high energy physics. It is published by Springer Science+Business Media on behalf of the International School for Advanced Studies. The journal is part of the SCOAP^{3} initiative.

== Abstracting and indexing ==
The journal is abstracted and indexed in:

- Current Contents/Physical, Chemical & Earth Sciences
- EBSCO databases
- Inspec
- MathSciNet
- Proquest databases
- Science Citation Index Expanded
- Scopus
- zbMATH Open

According to the Journal Citation Reports, the journal has a 2024 impact factor of 5.5.
