= Behrend function =

Function in algebraic geometry

In algebraic geometry, the Behrend function of a scheme X, introduced by Kai Behrend, is a constructible function
$$\nu_X: X \to \mathbb{Z}$$
such that if X is a quasi-projective proper moduli scheme carrying a symmetric obstruction theory, then the weighted Euler characteristic
$$\chi(X, \nu_X) = \sum_{n \in \mathbb{Z}} n \, \chi(\{\nu_X = n\})$$
is the degree of the virtual fundamental class
$$[X]^{\text{vir}}$$
of X, which is an element of the zeroth Chow group of X. Modulo some solvable technical difficulties (e.g., what is the Chow group of a stack?), the definition extends to moduli stacks such as the moduli stack of stable sheaves (the Donaldson–Thomas theory) or that of stable maps (the Gromov–Witten theory).
