= Mirror symmetry conjecture =

Mathematical conjecture

In mathematics, mirror symmetry is a conjectural relationship between certain Calabi–Yau manifolds and a constructed "mirror manifold". The conjecture allows one to relate the number of rational curves on a Calabi-Yau manifold (encoded as Gromov–Witten invariants) to integrals from a family of varieties (encoded as period integrals on a variation of Hodge structures). In short, this means there is a relation between the number of genus $g$ algebraic curves of degree $d$ on a Calabi-Yau variety $X$ and integrals on a dual variety $\check{X}$. These relations were original discovered by Candelas, de la Ossa, Green, and Parkes in a paper studying a generic quintic threefold in $\mathbb{P}^4$ as the variety $X$ and a construction from the quintic Dwork family $X_\psi$ giving $\check{X} = \tilde{X}_\psi$. Shortly after, Sheldon Katz wrote a summary paper outlining part of their construction and conjectures what the rigorous mathematical interpretation could be.

== Constructing the mirror of a quintic threefold ==
Originally, the construction of mirror manifolds was discovered through an ad-hoc procedure. Essentially, to a generic quintic threefold $X \subset \mathbb{CP}^4$ there should be associated a one-parameter family of Calabi-Yau manifolds $X_\psi$ which has multiple singularities. After blowing up these singularities, they are resolved and a new Calabi-Yau manifold $X^\vee$ was constructed. which had a flipped Hodge diamond. In particular, there are isomorphisms
$$H^q(X,\Omega_X^p) \cong H^q(X^\vee, \Omega_{X^\vee}^{3-p})$$
but most importantly, there is an isomorphism
$$H^1(X,\Omega_X^1) \cong H^1(X^\vee, \Omega_{X^\vee}^{2})$$
where the string theory (the A-model of $X$) for states in $H^1(X,\Omega_X^1)$ is interchanged with the string theory (the B-model of $X^\vee$) having states in $H^1(X^\vee, \Omega_{X^\vee}^{2})$. The string theory in the A-model only depended upon the Kähler or symplectic structure on $X$ while the B-model only depends upon the complex structure on $X^\vee$. Here we outline the original construction of mirror manifolds, and consider the string-theoretic background and conjecture with the mirror manifolds in a later section of this article.

=== Complex moduli ===
Recall that a generic quintic threefold $X$ in $\mathbb{P}^4$ is defined by a homogeneous polynomial of degree $5$. This polynomial is equivalently described as a global section of the line bundle $f \in \Gamma(\mathbb{P}^4,\mathcal{O}_{\mathbb{P}^4}(5))$. Notice the vector space of global sections has dimension
$$\dim { \Gamma (\mathbb {P} ^{4},{\mathcal {O}}_{\mathbb {P} ^{4}}(5))} = 126$$
but there are two equivalences of these polynomials. First, polynomials under scaling by the algebraic torus $\mathbb{G}_m$ (non-zero scalers of the base field) given equivalent spaces. Second, projective equivalence is given by the automorphism group of $\mathbb{P}^4$, $\text{PGL}(5)$ which is $24$ dimensional. This gives a $101$ dimensional parameter space
$$U_\text{smooth} \subset \mathbb{P}(\Gamma(\mathbb{P}^4,\mathcal{O}_{\mathbb{P}^4}(5)))/PGL(5)$$
since $126 - 24 - 1 = 101$, which can be constructed using Geometric invariant theory. The set $U_{\text{smooth}}$ corresponds to the equivalence classes of polynomials which define smooth Calabi-Yau quintic threefolds in $\mathbb{P}^4$, giving a moduli space of Calabi-Yau quintics. Now, using Serre duality and the fact each Calabi-Yau manifold has trivial canonical bundle $\omega_X$, the space of deformations has an isomorphism
$$H^1(X,T_X) \cong H^2(X,\Omega_X)$$
with the $(2,1)$ part of the Hodge structure on $H^3(X)$. Using the Lefschetz hyperplane theorem the only non-trivial cohomology group is $H^3(X)$ since the others are isomorphic to $H^i(\mathbb{P}^4)$. Using the Euler characteristic and the Euler class, which is the top Chern class, the dimension of this group is $204$. This is because
$$\begin{align}
\chi(X) &= -200 \\
&= h^0 + h^2 - h^3 +h^4 + h^6 \\
&= 1 + 1 - \dim H^3(X) + 1 + 1
\end{align}$$
Using the Hodge structure we can find the dimensions of each of the components. First, because $X$ is Calabi-Yau, $\omega_X \cong \mathcal{O}_X$ so
$$H^0(X,\Omega_X^3) \cong H^0(X,\mathcal{O}_X)$$
giving the Hodge numbers $h^{0,3} = h^{3,0} = 1$, hence
$$\dim H^2(X,\Omega_X) = h^{1,2} = 101$$
giving the dimension of the moduli space of Calabi-Yau manifolds. Because of the Bogomolev-Tian-Todorov theorem, all such deformations are unobstructed, so the smooth space $U_\text{smooth}$ is in fact the moduli space of quintic threefolds. The whole point of this construction is to show how the complex parameters in this moduli space are converted into Kähler parameters of the mirror manifold.

=== Mirror manifold ===
There is a distinguished family of Calabi-Yau manifolds $X_\psi$ called the Dwork family. It is the projective family
$$X_\psi = \text{Proj} \left(
\frac{\mathbb{C}[\psi][x_0,\ldots, x_4]}{(x_0^5 + \cdots + x_4^5 - 5\psi x_0x_1x_2x_3x_4)}
\right)$$
over the complex plane $\text{Spec}(\mathbb{C}[\psi])$. Now, notice there is only a single dimension of complex deformations of this family, coming from $\psi$ having varying values. This is important because the Hodge diamond of the mirror manifold $\check{X}$ has
$$\dim H^{2,1}(\check{X}) = 1.$$
The family $X_\psi$ has symmetry group
$$G = \left\{ (a_0,\ldots, a_4) \in (\mathbb{Z}/5)^5 : \sum a_i = 0 \right\}$$
acting by
$$(a_0,\ldots,a_4)\cdot [x_0:\cdots:x_4] = [e^{ a_0\cdot 2\pi i/5}x_0:\cdots : e^{ a_4 \cdot 2\pi i/5}x_4]$$
Notice the projectivity of $X_\psi$ is the reason for the condition
$$\sum_i a_i = 0.$$
The associated quotient variety $X_\psi / G$ has a crepant resolution given by blowing up the $100$ singularities
$$\check{X} \to X_\psi / G$$
giving a new Calabi-Yau manifold $\check{X}$ with $101$ parameters in $H^{1,1}(\check{X})$. This is the mirror manifold and has $H^3(\check{X}) = 4$ where each Hodge number is $1$.

== Ideas from string theory ==
In string theory there is a class of models called non-linear sigma models which study families of maps $\phi: \Sigma \to X$ where $\Sigma$ is a genus $g$ algebraic curve and $X$ is Calabi-Yau. These curves $\Sigma$ are called world-sheets and represent the birth and death of a particle as a closed string. Since a string could split over time into two strings, or more, and eventually these strings will come together and collapse at the end of the lifetime of the particle, an algebraic curve mathematically represents this string lifetime. For simplicity, only genus 0 curves were considered originally, and many of the results popularized in mathematics focused only on this case.

Also, in physics terminology, these theories are $(2,2)$ heterotic string theories because they have $N=2$ supersymmetry that comes in a pair, so really there are four supersymmetries. This is important because it implies there is a pair of operators
$$(Q,\overline{Q})$$
acting on the Hilbert space of states, but only defined up to a sign. This ambiguity is what originally suggested to physicists there should exist a pair of Calabi-Yau manifolds which have dual string theories, one's that exchange this ambiguity between one another.

The space $X$ has a complex structure, which is an integrable almost-complex structure $J \in \text{End}(TX)$, and because it is a Kähler manifold it necessarily has a symplectic structure $\omega$ called the Kähler form which can be complexified to a complexified Kähler form
$$\omega^\mathbb{C} = B + i\omega$$
which is a closed $(1,1)$-form, hence its cohomology class is in
$$[\omega^\mathbb{C}] \in H^1(X,\Omega_X^1)$$
The main idea behind the Mirror Symmetry conjectures is to study the deformations, or moduli, of the complex structure $J$ and the complexified symplectic structure $\omega^\mathbb{C}$ in a way that makes these two dual to each other. In particular, from a physics perspective, the super conformal field theory of a Calabi-Yau manifold $X$ should be equivalent to the dual super conformal field theory of the mirror manifold $X^\vee$. Here conformal means conformal equivalence which is the same as an equivalence class of complex structures on the curve $\Sigma$.

There are two variants of the non-linear sigma models called the A-model and the B-model which consider the pairs $(X,\omega^\mathbb{C})$ and $(X,J)$ and their moduli.

=== A-model ===
==== Correlation functions from String theory ====
Given a Calabi-Yau manifold $X$ with complexified Kähler class $[\omega^\mathbb{C}] \in H^1(X,\Omega_X^1)$ the nonlinear sigma model of the string theory should contain the three generations of particles, plus the electromagnetic, weak, and strong forces. In order to understand how these forces interact, a three-point function called the Yukawa coupling is introduced which acts as the correlation function for states in $H^1(X,\Omega^1_X)$. Note this space is the eigenspace of an operator $Q$ on the Hilbert space of states for the string theory. This three point function is "computed" as
$$\begin{align}
\langle \omega_1,\omega_2,\omega_3 \rangle =& \int_X \omega_1\wedge\omega_2\wedge\omega_3
+ \sum_{\beta\neq 0 }n_\beta\int_\beta\omega_1\int_\beta\omega_2\int_\beta\omega_2
\frac{e^{2\pi i \int_\beta \omega^{\mathbb{C}}}}{1 - e^{2\pi i \int_\beta \omega^{\mathbb{C}}}}
\end{align}$$
using Feynman path-integral techniques where the $n_\beta$ are the naive number of rational curves with homology class $\beta \in H_2(X;\mathbb{Z})$, and $\omega_i \in H^1(X,\Omega_X)$. Defining these instanton numbers $n_\beta$ is the subject matter of Gromov–Witten theory. Note that in the definition of this correlation function, it only depends on the Kähler class. This inspired some mathematicians to study hypothetical moduli spaces of Kähler structures on a manifold.

==== Mathematical interpretation of A-model correlation functions ====
In the A-model the corresponding moduli space are the moduli of pseudoholomorphic curves
$$\overline{\mathcal{M}}_{g,k}(X,J,\beta) = \{
(u:\Sigma \to X, j, z_1,\ldots, z_k) : u_*[\Sigma] = \beta, \overline{\partial}_Ju = 0
\}$$
or the Kontsevich moduli spaces
$$\overline{\mathcal{M}}_{g,n}(X,\beta) = \{u:\Sigma \to X : u \text{ is stable and } u_*([\Sigma]) = \beta \}$$
These moduli spaces can be equipped with a virtual fundamental class
$$[\overline{\mathcal{M}}_{g,k}(X,J,\beta)]^{virt}$$
or
$$[\overline{\mathcal{M}}_{g,n}(X,\beta)]^{virt}$$
which is represented as the vanishing locus of a section $\pi_{Coker}(v)$ of a sheaf called the Obstruction sheaf $\underline{\text{Obs}}$ over the moduli space. This section comes from the differential equation
$$\overline{\partial}_J(u) = v$$
which can be viewed as a perturbation of the map $u$. It can also be viewed as the Poincaré dual of the Euler class of $\underline{\text{Obs}}$ if it is a Vector bundle.

With the original construction, the A-model considered was on a generic quintic threefold in $\mathbb{P}^4$.

=== B-model ===
==== Correlation functions from String theory ====
For the same Calabi-Yau manifold $X$ in the A-model subsection, there is a dual superconformal field theory which has states in the eigenspace $H^1(X,T_X)$ of the operator $\overline{Q}$. Its three-point correlation function is defined as
$$\langle \theta_1,\theta_2,\theta_3 \rangle =
\int_X\Omega \wedge (\nabla_{\theta_1}\nabla_{\theta_2}\nabla_{\theta_3}\Omega)$$
where $\Omega \in H^0(X,\Omega_X^3)$ is a holomorphic 3-form on $X$ and for an infinitesimal deformation $\theta$ (since $H^1(X,T_X)$ is the tangent space of the moduli space of Calabi-Yau manifolds containing $X$, by the Kodaira–Spencer map and the Bogomolev-Tian-Todorov theorem) there is the Gauss-Manin connection $\nabla_\theta$ taking a $(p,q)$ class to a $(p+1,q-1)$ class, hence
$$\Omega \wedge (\nabla_{\theta_1}\nabla_{\theta_2}\nabla_{\theta_3}\Omega) \in H^3(X,\Omega_X^3)$$
can be integrated on $X$. Note that this correlation function only depends on the complex structure of $X$.

===== Another formulation of Gauss-Manin connection =====
The action of the cohomology classes $\theta \in H^1(X,T_X)$ on the $\Omega \in H^0(X,\Omega_X^3)$ can also be understood as a cohomological variant of the interior product. Locally, the class $\theta$ corresponds to a Čech cocycle $[\theta_{i}]_{i \in I}$ for some nice enough cover $\{U_i \}_{i \in I}$ giving a section $\theta_i \in T_X(U_i)$. Then, the insertion product gives an element
$$\iota_{\theta_i}(\Omega|_{U_i}) \in H^0(U_i,\Omega_X^2|_{U_i})$$
which can be glued back into an element $\iota_\theta(\Omega)$ of $H^1(X,\Omega_X^2)$. This is because on the overlaps
$$U_i\cap U_j = U_{ij},$$
$$\theta_{i}|_{ij} = \theta_{j}|_{ij}$$
giving
$$\begin{align}
(\iota_{\theta_i}\Omega|_{U_{i}})|_{U_{ij}} &= \iota_{
\theta_i|_{U_{ij}}
} (\Omega|_{U_{ij}}) \\
&= \iota_{
\theta_j|_{U_{ij}}
} (\Omega|_{U_{ij}}) \\
&= (\iota_{\theta_j}\Omega|_{U_j})|_{U_{ij}}
\end{align}$$
hence it defines a 1-cocycle. Repeating this process gives a 3-cocycle
$$\iota_{\theta_1}\iota_{\theta_2}\iota_{\theta_3}\Omega \in H^3(X,\mathcal{O}_X)$$
which is equal to $\nabla_{\theta_1}\nabla_{\theta_2}\nabla_{\theta_3}\Omega$. This is because locally the Gauss-Manin connection acts as the interior product.

==== Mathematical interpretation of B-model correlation functions ====
Mathematically, the B-model is a variation of hodge structures which was originally given by the construction from the Dwork family.

=== Mirror conjecture ===
Relating these two models of string theory by resolving the ambiguity of sign for the operators $(Q,\overline{Q})$ led physicists to the following conjecture: for a Calabi-Yau manifold $X$ there should exist a mirror Calabi-Yau manifold $X^\vee$ such that there exists a mirror isomorphism
$$H^1(X,\Omega_X) \cong H^1(X^\vee, T_{X^\vee})$$
giving the compatibility of the associated A-model and B-model. This means given $H \in H^1(X,\Omega_X)$ and $\theta \in H^1(X^\vee,T_{X^\vee})$ such that $H \mapsto \theta$ under the mirror map, there is the equality of correlation functions
$$\langle H,H,H\rangle = \langle \theta,\theta,\theta\rangle$$

This equation relates the number of degree $d$ genus $0$ curves on a quintic threefold $X$ in $\mathbb{P}^4$ (so $H^{1,1}\cong \mathbb{Z}$) to integrals in a variation of Hodge structures. Further, these integrals are actually computable.

== See also ==
- Cotangent complex
- Homotopy associative algebra
- Kuranishi structure
- Mirror symmetry (string theory)
- Moduli of algebraic curves
- Kontsevich moduli space
