= Chow group of a stack =

Concept in algebraic geometry

In algebraic geometry, the Chow group of a stack is a generalization of the Chow group of a variety or scheme to stacks. For a quotient stack $X = [Y/G]$, the Chow group of X is the same as the G-equivariant Chow group of Y.

A key difference from the theory of Chow groups of a variety is that a cycle is allowed to carry non-trivial automorphisms and consequently intersection-theoretic operations must take this into account. For example, the degree of a 0-cycle on a stack need not be an integer but is a rational number (due to non-trivial stabilizers).

== Definitions ==
Angelo Vistoli (1989) develops the basic theory (mostly over Q) for the Chow group of a (separated) Deligne–Mumford stack. There, the Chow group is defined exactly as in the classical case: it is the free abelian group generated by integral closed substacks modulo rational equivalence.

If a stack X can be written as the quotient stack $X = [Y/G]$ for some quasi-projective variety Y with a linearized action of a linear algebraic group G, then the Chow group of X is defined as the G-equivariant Chow group of Y. This approach is introduced and developed by Dan Edidin and William A. Graham, as well as Burt Totaro. Later Andrew Kresch (1999) extended the theory to a stack admitting a stratification by quotient stacks.

For higher Chow groups (precursor of motivic homologies) of algebraic stacks, see Roy Joshua's Intersection Theory on Stacks:I and II.

== Examples ==
The calculations depend on definitions. Thus, here, we proceed somehow axiomatically. Specifically, we assume: given an algebraic stack X locally of finite type over a base field k,

1. (homotopy-invariance) if E is a rank-n vector bundle on X, then $A_{p}(E) = A_{p-n}(X)$.
2. for each integral substack Z of dimension < p, $A_p(X - Z) = A_p(X)$, a corollary of a localization sequence.

These properties are valid if X is Deligne–Mumford and are expected to hold for any other reasonable theory.

We take X to be the classifying stack $B G$, the stack of principal G-bundles for a smooth linear algebraic group G. By definition, it is the quotient stack $[*/G]$, where * is viewed as the stack associated to * = Spec k. We approximate it as follows. Given an integer p, choose a representation $G \to GL(V)$ such that there is a G-invariant open subset U of V on which G acts freely and the complement $Z = V - U$ has codimension $> - \operatorname{dim} G - p$. Let $* \times_G V$ be the quotient of $* \times V$ by the action $(x, v) \cdot g = (xg, g^{-1} v)$. Note the action is free and so $* \times_G V$ is a vector bundle over $BG$. By Property 1 applied to this vector bundle,

$$A_p(BG) = A_{p+\dim V} (* \times_G V).$$

Then, since $* \times_G U = U/G$, by Property 2,

$$A_{p + \dim V}(* \times_G V) = A_{p + \dim V}(U/G)$$

since $\dim[Z/G] = \dim Z - \dim G < \dim V + p$.

As a concrete example, let $G = \mathbb{G}_m$ and let it act on $\mathbb{A}^n$ by scaling. Then $\mathbb{G}_m$ acts freely on $U = \mathbb{A}^n - \{ 0 \}$. By the above calculation, for each pair of integers n, p such that $n+p \ge 0$,

$$A_p(B \mathbb{G}_m) = A_{p+n}(\mathbb{P}^{n-1}).$$

In particular, for every integer p ≥ 0, $A_p(B \mathbb{G}_m) = 0$. In general, $A_{n-k}(\mathbb{P}^n) = \mathbb{Q}h^k$ for the hyperplane class h, $h^k$ k-times self-intersection and $h^k =0$ for negative k and so

$$A_p(B \mathbb{G}_m) = \mathbb{Q} h^{-1-p}$$

where the right-hand side is independent of models used in the calculation (since different h's correspond under the projections between projective spaces.) For $p = -1 = \dim B \mathbb{G}_m$, the class $h^0 = [\mathbb{P}^{n}]$, any n, may be thought of as the fundamental class of $B \mathbb{G}_m$.

Similarly, we have

$$A^*(B \mathbb{G}_m) = \mathbb{Q}[c]$$

where $c = c_1(h)$ is the first Chern class of h (and c and h are identified when Chow groups and Chow rings of projective spaces are identified). Since $h^k = c \cdot h^{k-1}$, we have that $A_*(B \mathbb{G}_m)$ is the free $\mathbb{Q}[c]$-module generated by $h^0$.

== Virtual fundamental class ==
The notion originates in the Kuranishi theory in symplectic geometry.

In § 2. of Behrend (2009), given a DM stack X and C_{X} the intrinsic normal cone to X, K. Behrend defines the virtual fundamental class of X as

$$[X]^{\text{vir}} = s_0^![C_X]$$

where s_{0} is the zero-section of the cone determined by the perfect obstruction theory and s_{0}^{!} is the refined Gysin homomorphism defined just as in Fulton's "Intersection theory". The same paper shows that the degree of this class, morally the integration over it, is equal to the weighted Euler characteristic of the Behrend function of X.

More recent (circa 2017) approaches do this type of construction in the context of derived algebraic geometry.

== See also ==
- Perfect obstruction theory
- Gromov–Witten invariant
- Cohomology of a stack
