= Quintic threefold =

3d hypersurface of degree 5

In mathematics, a quintic threefold is a 3-dimensional hypersurface of degree 5 in 4-dimensional projective space $\mathbb{P}^4$. Non-singular quintic threefolds are Calabi–Yau manifolds.

The Hodge diamond of a non-singular quintic 3-fold is

			1
		0		0
	0		1		0
1		101		101		1
	0		1		0
		0		0
			1

Physicist Robbert Dijkgraaf said "One number which every algebraic geometer knows is the number 2,875 because obviously, that is the number of lines on a quintic."

== Definition ==
A quintic threefold is a special class of Calabi–Yau manifolds defined by a degree $5$ projective variety in $\mathbb{P}^4$. Many examples are constructed as hypersurfaces in $\mathbb{P}^4$, or complete intersections lying in $\mathbb{P}^4$, or as a smooth variety resolving the singularities of another variety. As a set, a Calabi-Yau manifold is
$$X = \{x = [x_0:x_1:x_2:x_3:x_4] \in \mathbb{CP}^4 : p(x) = 0 \}$$
where $p(x)$ is a degree $5$ homogeneous polynomial. One of the most studied examples is from the polynomial
$$p(x) = x_0^5 + x_1^5 + x_2^5 + x_3^5 + x_4^5$$
called a Fermat polynomial. Proving that such a polynomial defines a Calabi-Yau requires some more tools, like the Adjunction formula and conditions for smoothness.

=== Hypersurfaces in P^{4} ===
Recall that a homogeneous polynomial $f \in \Gamma(\mathbb{P}^4,\mathcal{O}(d))$ (where $\mathcal{O}(d)$ is the Serre-twist of the hyperplane line bundle) defines a projective variety, or projective scheme, $X$, from the algebra
$$\frac{k[x_0,\ldots, x_4]}{(f)}$$
where $k$ is a field, such as $\mathbb{C}$. Then using the adjunction formula to compute its canonical bundle, we have
$$\begin{align}
\Omega_X^3 &= \omega_X \\
&= \omega_{\mathbb{P}^4}\otimes \mathcal{O}(d) \\
&\cong \mathcal{O}(-(4+1))\otimes\mathcal{O}(d) \\
&\cong \mathcal{O}(d-5)
\end{align}$$
hence in order for the variety to be Calabi-Yau, meaning it has a trivial canonical bundle, its degree must be $5$. It is then a Calabi-Yau manifold if in addition this variety is smooth. This can be checked by looking at the zeros of the polynomials
$$\partial_0f,\ldots, \partial_4f$$
and making sure the set
$$\{ x = [x_0:\cdots:x_4] | f(x) = \partial_0f(x) = \cdots = \partial_4f(x) = 0 \}$$
is empty.

== Examples ==
=== Fermat Quintic ===
One of the easiest examples to check of a Calabi-Yau manifold is given by the Fermat quintic threefold, which is defined by the vanishing locus of the polynomial
$$f = x_0^5 + x_1^5 + x_2^5 + x_3^5 + x_4^5$$
Computing the partial derivatives of $f$ gives the four polynomials
$$\begin{align}
\partial_0f = 5x_0^4\\
\partial_1f = 5x_1^4 \\
\partial_2f = 5x_2^4 \\
\partial_3f = 5x_3^4 \\
\partial_4f = 5x_4^4 \\
\end{align}$$
Since the only points where they vanish is given by the coordinate axes in $\mathbb{P}^4$, the vanishing locus is empty since $[0:0:0:0:0]$ is not a point in $\mathbb{P}^4$.

==== As a Hodge Conjecture testbed ====
Another application of the quintic threefold is in the study of the infinitesimal generalized Hodge conjecture where this difficult problem can be solved in this case. In fact, all of the lines on this hypersurface can be found explicitly.

=== Dwork family of quintic three-folds ===
Another popular class of examples of quintic three-folds, studied in many contexts, is the Dwork family. One popular study of such a family is from Candelas, De La Ossa, Green, and Parkes, when they discovered mirror symmetry. This is given by the family ^{pages 123-125}
$$f_\psi = x_0^5 + x_1^5 + x_2^5 + x_3^5 + x_4^5 - 5\psi x_0x_1x_2x_3x_4$$
where $\psi$ is a single parameter not equal to a 5-th root of unity. The smoothness of the quintic for these parameters can be found by computing the partial derivates of $f_\psi$ and evaluating their zeros. The partial derivatives are given by
$$\begin{align}
\partial_0f_\psi = 5x_0^4 - 5\psi x_1x_2x_3x_4 \\
\partial_1f_\psi = 5x_1^4 - 5\psi x_0x_2x_3x_4 \\
\partial_2f_\psi = 5x_2^4 - 5\psi x_0x_1x_3x_4 \\
\partial_3f_\psi = 5x_3^4 - 5\psi x_0x_1x_2x_4\\
\partial_4f_\psi = 5x_4^4 - 5\psi x_0x_1x_2x_3\\
\end{align}$$
At a point where the partial derivatives are all zero, this gives the relation $x_i^5 = \psi x_0x_1x_2x_3x_4$. For example, in $\partial_0f_\psi$ we get
$$\begin{align}
5x_0^4 &= 5\psi x_1x_2x_3x_4 \\
x_0^4 &= \psi x_1x_2x_3x_4 \\
x_0^5 &= \psi x_0x_1x_2x_3x_4
\end{align}$$
by dividing out the $5$ and multiplying each side by $x_0$. From multiplying these families of equations $x_i^5 = \psi x_0x_1x_2x_3x_4$ together we have the relation
$$\prod x_i^5 = \psi^5 \prod x_i^5$$
showing a solution is either given by an $x_i = 0$ or $\psi^5 = 1$. But in the first case, these give a smooth sublocus since the varying term in $f_\psi$ vanishes, so a singular point must lie in $\psi^5 = 1$. Given such a $\psi$, the singular points are then of the form
$$[\mu_5^{a_0}:\cdots:\mu_5^{a_4}]$$
such that
$$\mu_5^{\sum a_i}=\psi^{-1}$$
where $\mu_5 = e^{2 \pi i / 5}$. For example, the point
$$[\mu_5^4:\mu_5^{-1}:\mu_5^{-1}:\mu_5^{-1}:\mu_5^{-1}]$$
is a solution of both $f_1$ and its partial derivatives since $(\mu_5^i)^5 = (\mu_5^5)^i = 1^i = 1$, and $\psi = 1$.

=== Other examples ===
- Barth–Nieto quintic
- Consani–Scholten quintic

== Curves on a quintic threefold ==
The number of rational curves of degree $1$ can be computed explicitly using Schubert calculus. Let $T^*$ be the rank $2$ vector bundle on the Grassmannian $G(2,5)$ of $2$-planes in some rank $5$ vector space. Projectivizing $G(2,5)$ to $\mathbb{G}(1,4)$ gives the projective Grassmannian of degree $1$ lines in $\mathbb{P}^4$ and $T^*$ descends to a vector bundle on this projective Grassmannian. Its total Chern class is
$$c(T^*) = 1 + \sigma_1 + \sigma_{1,1}$$
in the Chow ring $A^\bullet(\mathbb{G}(1,4))$. Now, a section $l \in \Gamma(\mathbb{G}(1,4),T^*)$ of the bundle corresponds to a linear homogeneous polynomial, $\tilde{l} \in \Gamma(\mathbb{P}^4,\mathcal{O}(1))$, so a section of $\text{Sym}^5(T^*)$ corresponds to a quintic polynomial, a section of $\Gamma(\mathbb{P}^4,\mathcal{O}(5))$. Then, in order to calculate the number of lines on a generic quintic threefold, it suffices to compute the integral
$$\int_{\mathbb{G}(1,4)} c(\text{Sym}^5(T^*)) = 2875$$
This can be done by using the splitting principle. Since
$$\begin{align}
c(T^*) &= (1+\alpha)(1+\beta) \\
&= 1 + (\alpha + \beta) + \alpha\beta
\end{align}$$
and for a dimension $2$ vector space, $V = V_1\oplus V_2$,
$$\text{Sym}^5(V) = \bigoplus_{i=0}^5 (V_1^{\otimes 5-i}\otimes V_2^{\otimes i})$$
so the total Chern class of $\text{Sym}^5(T^*)$ is given by the product
$$c(\text{Sym}^5(T^*)) = \prod_{i=0}^5 (1 + (5-i)\alpha  + i\beta)$$
Then, the Euler class, or the top class is
$$5\alpha(4\alpha + \beta)(3\alpha + 2\beta)(2\alpha + 3\beta)(\alpha + 4\beta)5\beta$$
expanding this out in terms of the original Chern classes gives
$$\begin{align}
c_6(\text{Sym}^5(T^*)) &= 25\sigma_{1,1}(4\sigma_1^2 + 9\sigma_{1,1})(6\sigma_1^2 + \sigma_{1,1}) \\
&= (100 \sigma_{3,1} + 100\sigma_{2,2} + 225\sigma_{2,2})(6\sigma_1^2 + \sigma_{1,1}) \\
&= (100 \sigma_{3,1} + 325\sigma_{2,2})(6\sigma_1^2 + \sigma_{1,1})\\
&= 600 \sigma_{3,3} + 2275 \sigma_{3,3}\\
&= 2875 \sigma_{3,3}
\end{align}$$
using relations implied by Pieri's formula, including $\sigma_1^2 = \sigma_2 + \sigma_{1,1}$, $\sigma_{1,1}\cdot \sigma_1^2 = \sigma_{3,1} + \sigma_{2,2}$, $\sigma_{1,1}^2 = \sigma_{2,2}$.

=== Rational curves ===
Herbert Clemens (1984) conjectured that the number of rational curves of a given degree on a generic quintic threefold is finite. (Some smooth but non-generic quintic threefolds have infinite families of lines on them.) This was verified for degrees up to 7 by Sheldon Katz (1986) who also calculated the number 609250 of degree 2 rational curves. Brian Greene and Ronen Plesser (1989) proposed a construction for a mirror manifold of quintic threefolds. Philip Candelas, Xenia C. de la Ossa, and Paul S. Green et al. (1991) conjectured a general formula for the virtual number of rational curves of any degree. The formula was independently verified by Givental (1996) and B. Lian, K. Liu, and S.-T. Yau (1997). The fact that the virtual number equals the actual number relies on confirmation of Clemens' conjecture, currently known for degree at most 11 Cotterill (2012). The number of rational curves of various degrees on a generic quintic threefold is given by

2875, 609250, 317206375, 242467530000, ...(sequence A076912 in the OEIS).

Since the generic quintic threefold is a Calabi–Yau threefold and the moduli space of rational curves of a given degree is a discrete, finite set (hence compact), these have well-defined Donaldson–Thomas invariants (the "virtual number of points"); at least for degree 1 and 2, these agree with the actual number of points.

== See also ==
- Deformation theory
- Enumerative geometry
- Gromov–Witten invariant
- Hodge structure
- Jacobian ideal - gives an explicit basis for the Hodge-decomposition
- Mirror symmetry (string theory)
- Schubert calculus - techniques for determining the number of lines on a quintic threefold
