= Caterina Consani =

Italian mathematician (born 1963)

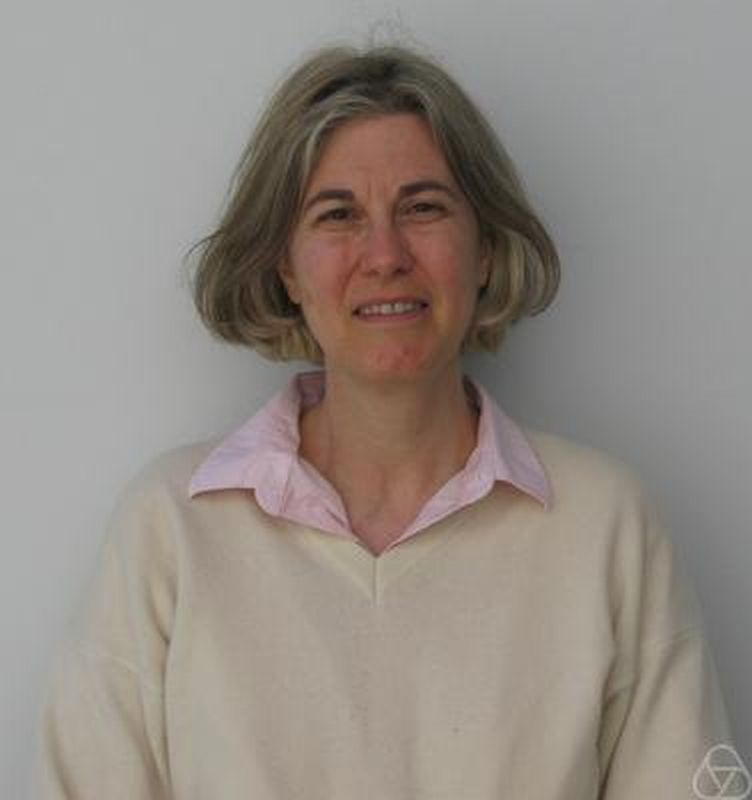
Oberwolfach, 2011

Caterina (Katia) Consani (born 1963) is an Italian mathematician specializing in arithmetic geometry. She is a professor of mathematics at Johns Hopkins University.

== Contributions ==
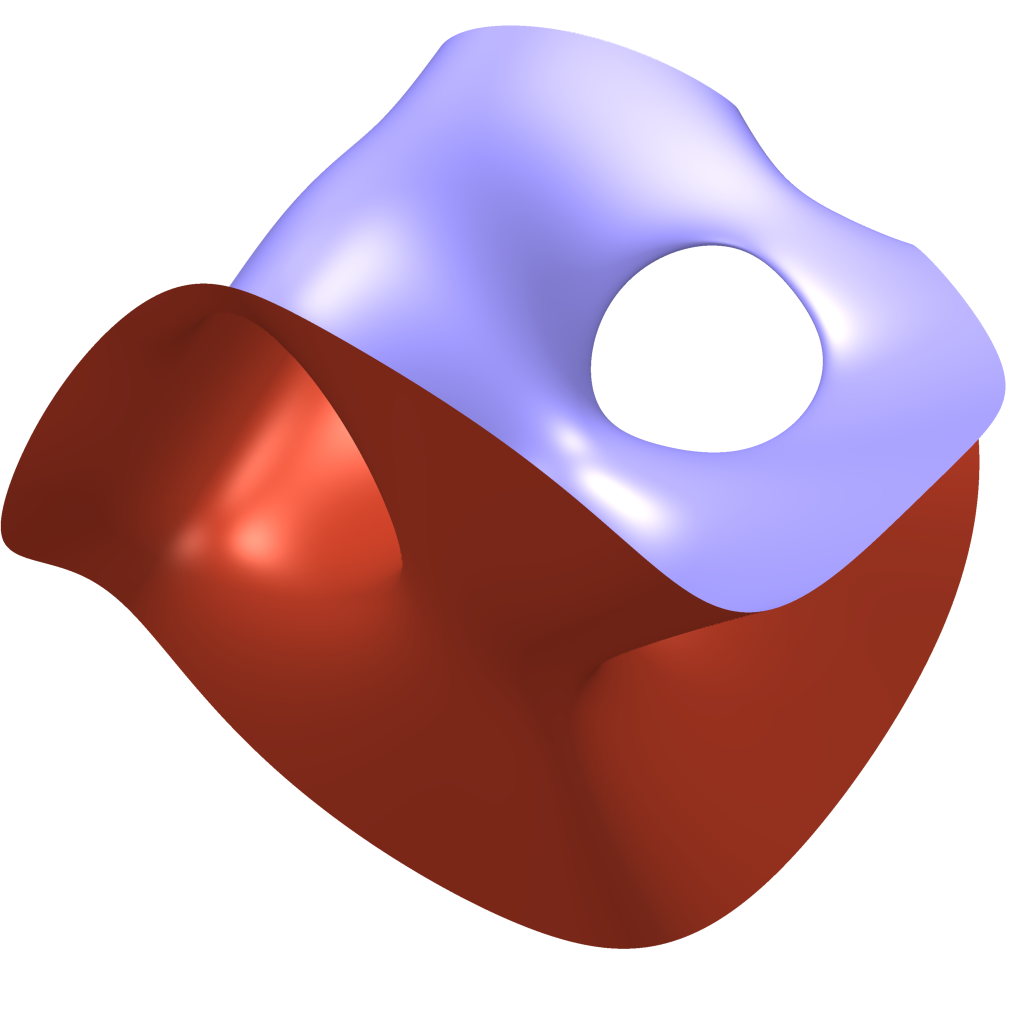
A slice of the Consani–Scholten quintic

Consani is the namesake of the Consani–Scholten quintic, a quintic threefold that she described with Jasper Scholten in 2001,^{[Q3]} and of the Connes–Consani plane connection, a relationship between the field with one element and certain group actions on projective spaces investigated by Consani with Alain Connes.^{[AC]} She is also known for her work with Matilde Marcolli on Arakelov theory and noncommutative geometry.^{[NG]}

== Education and career ==
Consani was born January 9, 1963, in Chiavari. She earned a laurea in mathematics in 1986 at the University of Genoa, a doctorate (dottorato di ricerca) in 1992 from the University of Genoa and the University of Turin, and a second doctorate in 1996 from the University of Chicago. Her first doctoral dissertation was Teoria dell’ intersezione e K-teoria su varietà singolari, supervised by Claudio Pedrini, and her second dissertation was Double Complexes and Euler L-factors on Degenerations of Algebraic Varieties, supervised by Spencer Bloch.

She was a C. L. E. Moore instructor at the Massachusetts Institute of Technology from 1996 to 1999, overlapping with a research visit in 1998 to the University of Cambridge. After additional postdoctoral research at the Institute for Advanced Study, she became an assistant professor at the University of Toronto in 2000, and moved to Johns Hopkins in 2005.

== Recognition ==
Consani was elected as a Fellow of the American Mathematical Society in the 2024 class of fellows.

== Selected publications ==
Q3.	Consani, Caterina; Scholten, Jasper (2001), "Arithmetic on a quintic threefold", International Journal of Mathematics, 12 (8): 943–972, doi:10.1142/S0129167X01001118, MR 1863287

NG.	Consani, Caterina; Marcolli, Matilde (2004), "Noncommutative geometry, dynamics, and ∞-adic Arakelov geometry", Selecta Mathematica, New Series, 10 (2): 167–251, arXiv:math/0205306, doi:10.1007/s00029-004-0369-3, MR 2080121, S2CID 51793790

S1.	Connes, Alain; Consani, Caterina (2010), "Schemes over $\mathbb{F}_1$ and zeta functions", Compositio Mathematica, 146 (6): 1383–1415, arXiv:0903.2024, doi:10.1112/S0010437X09004692, MR 2735370, S2CID 14448430

AC.	Connes, Alain; Consani, Caterina (2011), "The hyperring of adèle classes", Journal of Number Theory, 131 (2): 159–194, arXiv:1001.4260, doi:10.1016/j.jnt.2010.09.001, MR 2736850
