= Kai Behrend =

German mathematician

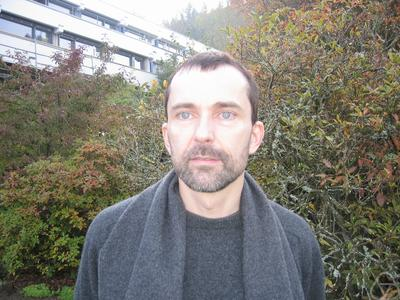
- Behrend in 2006
- Born: Hamburg, Germany
- Education: University of California, Berkeley; Harvard University
- Known for: Behrend function Behrend's trace formula Perfect obstruction theory
- Awards: Coxeter–James Prize, 2001; Jeffery–Williams Prize, 2011; CRM-Fields-PIMS Prize, 2015
- Scientific career
- Fields: Mathematics
- Workplaces: Massachusetts Institute of Technology; University of British Columbia
- Doctoral advisor: Arthur Ogus
- Other academic advisors: Günter Harder

Kai A. Behrend is a German mathematician. He is a professor at the University of British Columbia in Vancouver, British Columbia, Canada.

His work is in algebraic geometry and he has made important contributions in the theory of algebraic stacks, Gromov–Witten invariants and Donaldson–Thomas theory (cf. Behrend function). He is also known for Behrend's formula, the generalization of the Grothendieck–Lefschetz trace formula to algebraic stacks.

He is the recipient of the 2001 Coxeter–James Prize, the 2011 Jeffery–Williams Prize, and the 2015 CRM-Fields-PIMS Prize. He was elected to the 2018 class of fellows of the American Mathematical Society. He was also an invited speaker at the ICM 2014.

== Selected publications ==
- Behrend, Kai; Bryan, Jim; Szendrői, Balázs (2013). "Motivic degree zero Donaldson–Thomas invariants". Inventiones Mathematicae. 192 (1): 111–160. arXiv:0909.5088. Bibcode:2013InMat.192..111B. doi:10.1007/s00222-012-0408-1. ISSN 0020-9910.
- Behrend, Kai (1 November 2009). "Donaldson-Thomas type invariants via microlocal geometry". Annals of Mathematics. 170 (3): 1307–1338. arXiv:math/0507523. doi:10.4007/annals.2009.170.1307. ISSN 0003-486X.
- Behrend, K. (1997). "Gromov-Witten invariants in algebraic geometry". Inventiones Mathematicae. 127 (3). Springer Science and Business Media LLC: 601–617. arXiv:alg-geom/9601011. Bibcode:1997InMat.127..601B. doi:10.1007/s002220050132. ISSN 0020-9910. S2CID 9929474.
- Behrend, K.; Fantechi, B. (19 March 1997). "The intrinsic normal cone". Inventiones Mathematicae. 128 (1). Springer Science and Business Media LLC: 45–88. arXiv:alg-geom/9601010. Bibcode:1997InMat.128...45B. doi:10.1007/s002220050136. ISSN 0020-9910. S2CID 18533009.
- Behrend, K.; Manin, Yu. (1 October 1996). "Stacks of stable maps and Gromov-Witten invariants". Duke Mathematical Journal. 85 (1). Duke University Press. arXiv:alg-geom/9506023. doi:10.1215/s0012-7094-96-08501-4. ISSN 0012-7094. S2CID 16512308.
- Behrend, Kai A. (2003). "Derived 𝑙-adic categories for algebraic stacks". Memoirs of the American Mathematical Society. 163 (774). American Mathematical Society (AMS): 0. doi:10.1090/memo/0774. ISSN 0065-9266. MR 1963494
