= Cristina Manolache =

Italian mathematician

- Citizenship: Italian
- Education: Imperial College, London
- Awards: Emmy Noether Fellowship
- Scientific career
- Fields: Mathematics
- Workplaces: University of Sheffield
- Thesis: Virtual intersections (2008/2009)
- Doctoral advisor: Ionut¸ Ciocan-Fontanine, Barbara Fantechi

Cristina Manolache is a mathematician and Senior Lecturer in the School of Mathematics and Statistics at the University of Sheffield.

== Education and career ==
Manolache received her PhD in Mathematics from SISSA in 2009. Her dissertation, Virtual Intersections, was supervised by Barbara Fantechi. Manolache specializes in algebraic geometry and has expertise in birational geometry and wall crossings. She has contributed to publications of the American Mathematical Society and Cambridge University Press. Notable publications include Reduced invariants from cuspidal maps (2020), co-authored with Luca Battistella and Francesca Carocci; Stable maps and stable quotients (2014); Virtual pull-backs] (2012); and Virtual push-forwards (2012).

== Awards and honors ==
Manolache was awarded the Emmy Noether Fellowship in 2020.
