= Convexity (algebraic geometry) =

In algebraic geometry, convexity is a restrictive technical condition for algebraic varieties originally introduced to analyze Kontsevich moduli spaces $\overline{M}_{0,n}(X,\beta)$ in quantum cohomology. These moduli spaces are smooth orbifolds whenever the target space is convex. A variety $X$ is called convex if the pullback of the tangent bundle to a stable rational curve $f:C \to X$ has globally generated sections. Geometrically this implies the curve is free to move around $X$ infinitesimally without any obstruction. Convexity is generally phrased as the technical condition

$$H^1(C, f^*T_X) = 0$$

since Serre's vanishing theorem guarantees this sheaf has globally generated sections. Intuitively this means that on a neighborhood of a point, with a vector field in that neighborhood, the local parallel transport can be extended globally. This generalizes the idea of convexity in Euclidean geometry, where given two points $p,q$ in a convex set $C \subset \mathbb{R}^n$, all of the points $tp + (1-t)q$ are contained in that set. There is a vector field $\mathcal{X}_{U_p}$ in a neighborhood $U_p$ of $p$ transporting $p$ to each point $p' \in \{ tp + (1-t)q : t \in [0,1] \} \cap U_p$. Since the vector bundle of $\mathbb{R}^n$ is trivial, hence globally generated, there is a vector field $\mathcal{X}$ on $\mathbb{R}^n$ such that the equality $\mathcal{X}|_{U_p} = \mathcal{X}_{U_{p}}$ holds on restriction.

== Examples ==
There are many examples of convex spaces, including the following.

=== Spaces with trivial rational curves ===
If the only maps from a rational curve to $X$ are constants maps, then the pullback of the tangent sheaf is the free sheaf $\mathcal{O}_C^{\oplus n}$ where $n = \dim(X)$. These sheaves have trivial non-zero cohomology, and hence they are always convex. In particular, Abelian varieties have this property since the Albanese variety of a rational curve $C$ is trivial, and every map from a variety to an Abelian variety factors through the Albanese.

=== Projective spaces ===
Projective spaces are examples of homogeneous spaces, but their convexity can also be proved using a sheaf cohomology computation. Recall the Euler sequence relates the tangent space through a short exact sequence

$$0 \to \mathcal{O} \to \mathcal{O}(1)^{\oplus (n+1)} \to \mathcal{T}_{\mathbb{P}^n} \to 0$$

If we only need to consider degree $d$ embeddings, there is a short exact sequence

$$0 \to \mathcal{O}_C \to \mathcal{O}_C(d)^{\oplus (n+1)} \to f^*\mathcal{T}_{\mathbb{P}^n} \to 0$$

giving the long exact sequence

$$\begin{align}
0 & \to H^0(C,\mathcal{O}) \to  H^0(C,\mathcal{O}(d)^{\oplus(n+1)}) \to H^0(C,f^*\mathcal{T}_{\mathbb{P}^n}) \\
& \to  H^1(C,\mathcal{O}) \to  H^1(C,\mathcal{O}(d)^{\oplus(n+1)}) \to  H^1(C,f^*\mathcal{T}_{\mathbb{P}^n}) \to  0
\end{align}$$

since the first two $H^1$-terms are zero, which follows from $C$ being of genus $0$, and the second calculation follows from the Riemann–Roch theorem, we have convexity of $\mathbb{P}^n$. Then, any nodal map can be reduced to this case by considering one of the components $C_i$ of $C$.

=== Homogeneous spaces ===
Another large class of examples are homogenous spaces $G/P$ where $P$ is a parabolic subgroup of $G$. These have globally generated sections since $G$ acts transitively on $X$, meaning it can take a bases in $T_xX$ to a basis in any other point $T_yX$, hence it has globally generated sections. Then, the pullback is always globally generated. This class of examples includes Grassmannians, projective spaces, and flag varieties.

=== Product spaces ===
Also, products of convex spaces are still convex. This follows from the Künneth theorem in coherent sheaf cohomology.

=== Projective bundles over curves ===
One more non-trivial class of examples of convex varieties are projective bundles $\mathbb{P}(\mathcal{E})$ for an algebraic vector bundle $\mathcal{E} \to C$ over a smooth algebraic curve^{pg 6}.

== Applications ==
There are many useful technical advantages of considering moduli spaces of stable curves mapping to convex spaces. That is, the Kontsevich moduli spaces $\overline{M}_{0,n}(X,\beta)$ have nice geometric and deformation-theoretic properties.

=== Deformation theory ===
The deformations of $f:C \to X$ in the Hilbert scheme of graphs $\operatorname{Hom}(C,X) \subset \operatorname{Hilb}_{C\times X/\operatorname{Spec}(\mathbb{C})}$ has tangent space

$T_{\operatorname{Hom}(C,X)}([f]) \cong H^0(C, f^*T_X)$

where $[f] \in \operatorname{Hom}(C,X)$ is the point in the scheme representing the map. Convexity of $X$ gives the dimension formula below. In addition, convexity implies all infinitesimal deformations are unobstructed.

=== Structure ===
These spaces are normal projective varieties of pure dimension

$\dim(\overline{M}_{0,n}(X,\beta)) = \dim(X) + \int_\beta c_1(T_X) + n - 3$

which are locally the quotient of a smooth variety by a finite group. Also, the open subvariety $\overline{M}_{0,n}^*(X,\beta)$ parameterizing non-singular maps is a smooth fine moduli space. In particular, this implies the stacks $\overline{\mathcal{M}}_{0,n}(X,\beta)$ are orbifolds.

=== Boundary divisors ===
The moduli spaces $\overline{M}_{0,n}(X,\beta)$ have nice boundary divisors for convex varieties $X$ given by

$D(A,B;\beta_1,\beta_2) = \overline{M}_{0,A\cup \{\bullet \}}(X,\beta_1) \times_X \overline{M}_{0,B\cup \{\bullet \}}(X,\beta_2)$

for a partition $A\cup B$ of $[n]$ and $\{ \bullet \}$ the point lying along the intersection of two rational curves $C = C_1 \cup C_2$.

== See also ==
- Stable curve
- Moduli space
- Gromov–Witten invariant
- Quantum cohomology
- Moduli of curves
