= Perfect obstruction theory =

In algebraic geometry, given a Deligne–Mumford stack X, a perfect obstruction theory for X consists of:

1. a perfect two-term complex $E = [E^{-1} \to E^0]$ in the derived category $D(\text{Qcoh}(X)_{et})$ of quasi-coherent étale sheaves on X, and
2. a morphism $\varphi\colon E \to \textbf{L}_X$, where $\textbf{L}_X$ is the cotangent complex of X, that induces an isomorphism on $h^0$ and an epimorphism on $h^{-1}$.

The notion was introduced by Kai Behrend and Barbara Fantechi (1997) for an application to the intersection theory on moduli stacks; in particular, to define a virtual fundamental class.

== Examples ==
=== Schemes ===
Consider a regular embedding $I \colon Y \to W$ fitting into a cartesian square

$$\begin{matrix}
X & \xrightarrow{j} & V \\
g \downarrow & & \downarrow f \\
Y & \xrightarrow{i} & W
\end{matrix}$$

where $V,W$ are smooth. Then, the complex

$E^\bullet = [g^*N_{Y/W}^{\vee} \to j^*\Omega_V]$ (in degrees $-1, 0$)

forms a perfect obstruction theory for X. The map comes from the composition

$$g^*N_{Y/W}^\vee \to g^*i^*\Omega_W =j^*f^*\Omega_W \to j^*\Omega_V$$

This is a perfect obstruction theory because the complex comes equipped with a map to $\mathbf{L}_X^\bullet$ coming from the maps $g^*\mathbf{L}_Y^\bullet \to \mathbf{L}_X^\bullet$ and $j^*\mathbf{L}_V^\bullet \to \mathbf{L}_X^\bullet$. Note that the associated virtual fundamental class is $[X,E^\bullet] = i^![V]$

==== Example 1 ====
Consider a smooth projective variety $Y \subset \mathbb{P}^n$. If we set $V = W$, then the perfect obstruction theory in $D^{[-1,0]}(X)$ is

$$[N_{X/\mathbb{P}^n}^\vee \to \Omega_{\mathbb{P}^n}]$$

and the associated virtual fundamental class is

$$[X,E^\bullet] = i^![\mathbb{P}^n]$$

In particular, if $Y$ is a smooth local complete intersection then the perfect obstruction theory is the cotangent complex (which is the same as the truncated cotangent complex).

=== Deligne–Mumford stacks ===
The previous construction works too with Deligne–Mumford stacks.

== Symmetric obstruction theory ==
By definition, a symmetric obstruction theory is a perfect obstruction theory together with nondegenerate symmetric bilinear form.

Example: Let f be a regular function on a smooth variety (or stack). Then the set of critical points of f carries a symmetric obstruction theory in a canonical way.

Example: Let M be a complex symplectic manifold. Then the (scheme-theoretic) intersection of Lagrangian submanifolds of M carries a canonical symmetric obstruction theory.

== See also ==
- Behrend function
- Gromov–Witten invariant
