= Mirror symmetry (disambiguation) =

Mirror symmetry is symmetry with respect to a reflection.

Mirror symmetry may also refer to:

- Mirror symmetry (string theory), a relation between two Calabi–Yau manifolds in string theory
- Homological mirror symmetry, a mathematical conjecture about Calabi–Yau manifolds made by Maxim Kontsevich
- Mirror symmetry conjecture, a mathematical conjecture about mirror symmetry
- P-symmetry, symmetry under parity inversion
- Mirror-symmetry breaking
