= Bloch's higher Chow group =

In algebraic geometry, Bloch's higher Chow groups, a generalization of Chow group, is a precursor and a basic example of motivic cohomology (for smooth varieties). It was introduced by Spencer Bloch (Bloch 1986) and the basic theory has been developed by Bloch and Marc Levine.

In more precise terms, a theorem of Voevodsky implies: for a smooth scheme X over a field and integers p, q, there is a natural isomorphism

$$\operatorname{H}^p(X; \mathbb{Z}(q)) \simeq \operatorname{CH}^q(X, 2q - p)$$

between motivic cohomology groups and higher Chow groups.

== Motivation ==
One of the motivations for higher Chow groups comes from homotopy theory. In particular, if $\alpha,\beta \in Z_*(X)$ are algebraic cycles in $X$ which are rationally equivalent via a cycle $\gamma \in Z_*(X\times \Delta^1)$, then $\gamma$ can be thought of as a path between $\alpha$ and $\beta$, and the higher Chow groups are meant to encode the information of higher homotopy coherence. For example,

$\text{CH}^*(X,0)$

can be thought of as the homotopy classes of cycles while

$\text{CH}^*(X,1)$

can be thought of as the homotopy classes of homotopies of cycles.

== Definition ==
Let X be a quasi-projective algebraic scheme over a field (“algebraic” means separated and of finite type).

For each integer $q \ge 0$, define

$$\Delta^q = \operatorname{Spec}(\mathbb{Z}[t_0, \dots, t_q]/(t_0 + \dots + t_q - 1)),$$

which is an algebraic analog of a standard q-simplex. For each sequence $0 \le i_1 < i_2 < \cdots < i_r \le q$, the closed subscheme $t_{i_1} = t_{i_2} = \cdots = t_{i_r} = 0$, which is isomorphic to $\Delta^{q-r}$, is called a face of $\Delta^q$.

For each i, there is the embedding

$$\partial_{q, i}: \Delta^{q-1} \overset{\sim}\to \{ t_i = 0 \} \subset \Delta^q.$$

We write $Z_i(X)$ for the group of algebraic i-cycles on X and $z_r(X, q) \subset Z_{r+q}(X \times \Delta^q)$ for the subgroup generated by closed subvarieties that intersect properly with $X \times F$ for each face F of $\Delta^q$.

Since $\partial_{X, q, i} = \operatorname{id}_X \times \partial_{q, i}: X \times \Delta^{q-1} \hookrightarrow X \times \Delta^q$ is an effective Cartier divisor, there is the Gysin homomorphism:

$$\partial_{X, q, i}^*: z_r(X, q) \to z_r(X, q-1)$$,

that (by definition) maps a subvariety V to the intersection $(X \times \{ t_i = 0 \}) \cap V.$

Define the boundary operator $d_q = \sum_{i=0}^q (-1)^i \partial_{X, q, i}^*$ which yields the chain complex

$$\cdots \to z_r(X, q) \overset{d_q}\to z_r(X, q-1) \overset{d_{q-1}}\to \cdots \overset{d_1}\to z_r(X, 0).$$

Finally, the q-th higher Chow group of X is defined as the q-th homology of the above complex:

$$\operatorname{CH}_r(X, q) := \operatorname{H}_q(z_r(X, \cdot)).$$

(More simply, since $z_r(X, \cdot)$ is naturally a simplicial abelian group, in view of the Dold–Kan correspondence, higher Chow groups can also be defined as homotopy groups $\operatorname{CH}_r(X, q) := \pi_q z_r(X, \cdot)$.)

For example, if $V \subset X \times \Delta^1$ is a closed subvariety such that the intersections $V(0), V(\infty)$ with the faces $0, \infty$ are proper, then $d_1(V) = V(0) - V(\infty)$ and this means, by Proposition 1.6. in Fulton’s intersection theory, that the image of $d_1$ is precisely the group of cycles rationally equivalent to zero; that is,

$\operatorname{CH}_r(X, 0) =$ the r-th Chow group of X.

== Properties ==
=== Functoriality ===
Proper maps $f:X\to Y$ are covariant between the higher chow groups while flat maps are contravariant. Also, whenever $Y$ is smooth, any map to $Y$ is contravariant.

=== Homotopy invariance ===
If $E \to X$ is an algebraic vector bundle, then there is the homotopy equivalence

$\text{CH}^*(X,n) \cong \text{CH}^*(E,n)$

=== Localization ===
Given a closed equidimensional subscheme $Y \subset X$ there is a localization long exact sequence

$$\begin{align}
\cdots \\
\text{CH}^{*-d}(Y,2) \to \text{CH}^{*}(X,2) \to \text{CH}^{*}(U,2) \to & \\
\text{CH}^{*-d}(Y,1) \to \text{CH}^{*}(X,1) \to \text{CH}^{*}(U,1) \to & \\
\text{CH}^{*-d}(Y,0) \to \text{CH}^{*}(X,0) \to \text{CH}^{*}(U,0) \to & \text{ }0
\end{align}$$

where $U = X-Y$. In particular, this shows the higher chow groups naturally extend the exact sequence of chow groups.

== Localization theorem ==
(Bloch 1994) showed that, given an open subset $U \subset X$, for $Y = X - U$,

$$z(X, \cdot)/z(Y, \cdot) \to z(U, \cdot)$$

is a homotopy equivalence. In particular, if $Y$ has pure codimension, then it yields the long exact sequence for higher Chow groups (called the localization sequence).

== Rational coefficients ==
With rational coefficients, higher Chow groups identify with a piece of algebraic $K$-theory

$$\operatorname{H}^p(X; \mathbb{Q}(q)) \simeq \operatorname{CH}^q(X, 2q - p)\otimes\mathbb Q \simeq K_{2p-q}(X)^{(q)},$$

namely the eigenspace of the Adams operation $\Psi^l$ associated to the eigenvalue $l^q$ (which does not depend on choice of $l$).
