= Consani–Scholten quintic =

Algebraic hypersurface

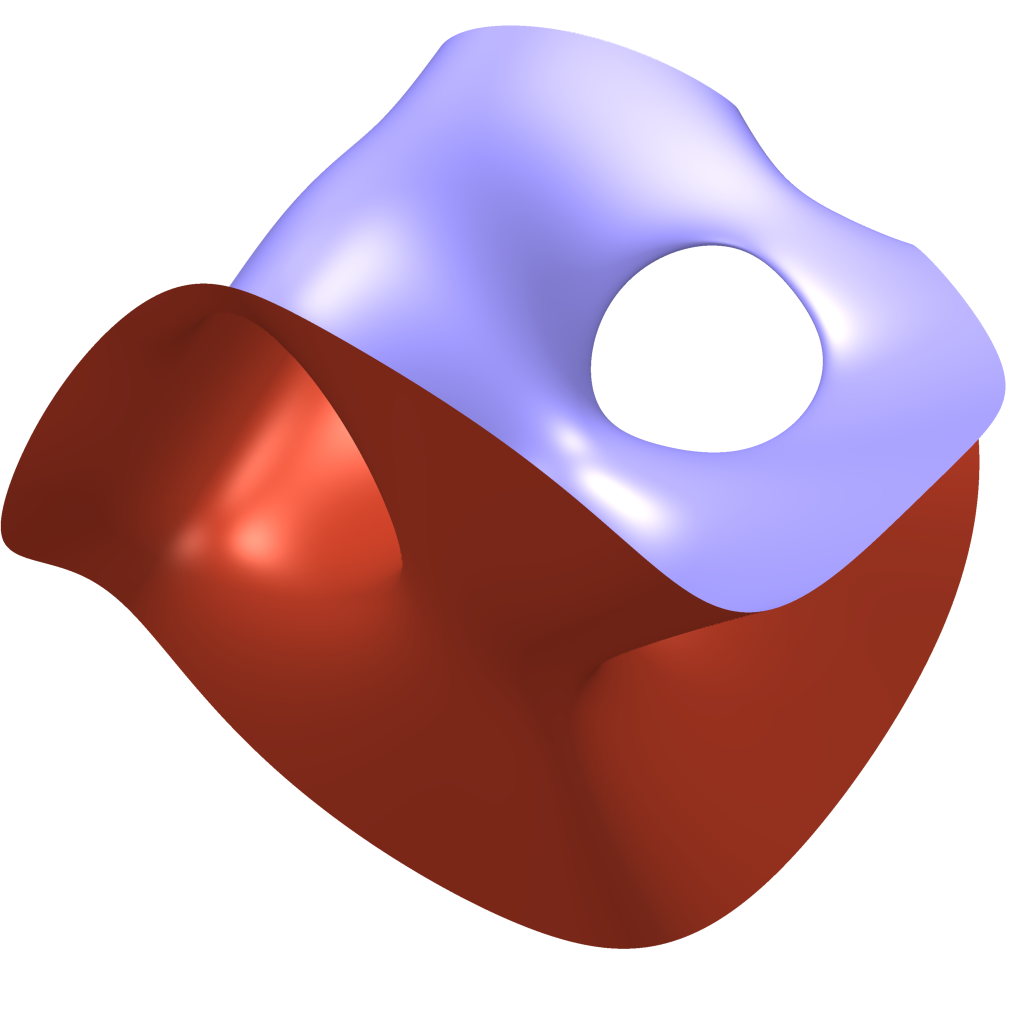
A slice of the Consani–Scholten quintic

In the mathematical fields of algebraic geometry and arithmetic geometry, the Consani–Scholten quintic is an algebraic hypersurface (the set of solutions to a single polynomial equation in multiple variables) studied in 2001 by Caterina Consani and Jasper Scholten. It has been used as a test case for the Langlands program.

== Definition ==
Consani and Scholten define their hypersurface from the (projectivized) set of solutions to the equation

$$P(x,y)=P(z,w)$$

in four complex variables, where

$$P(x,y)=x^5+y^5-(5xy-5)(x^2+y^2-x-y).$$

In this form the resulting hypersurface is singular: it has 120 double points. Its Hodge diamond is

			1
		0		0
	0		141		0
1		1		1		1
	0		141		0
		0		0
			1

The Consani–Scholton quintic itself is the non-singular hypersurface obtained by blowing up these singularities. As a non-singular quintic threefold, it is a Calabi–Yau manifold.

== Modularity ==
According to the Langlands program, for any Calabi–Yau threefold $X$ over $\mathbb{Q}$, the Galois representations giving the action of the absolute Galois group on the $\ell$-adic étale cohomology $H^3(X_{\bar\mathbb{Q}},\mathbb{Q}_{\ell})$ (for prime numbers $\ell$ of good reduction, which for this curve means any prime other than 2, 3, or 5) should have the same L-series as an automorphic form. This was known for "rigid" Calabi–Yau threefolds, for which the family of Galois representations has dimension two, by the proof of Serre's modularity conjecture. The Consani–Scholton quintic provides a non-rigid example, where the dimension is four. Consani and Scholten constructed a Hilbert modular form and conjectured that its L-series agreed with the Galois representations for their curve; this was proven by Dieulefait, Pacetti & Schütt (2012).
