= Emmy Noether Fellowship =

Fellowship awarded by the London Mathematical Society

The LMS Emmy Noether Fellowship is a fellowship awarded by the London Mathematical Society.

"The fellowships are designed to enhance the mathematical sciences research, broadly construed, of holders either re-establishing their research programme after returning from a major break associated with caring responsibilities or those requiring support to maintain their research programme while dealing with significant ongoing caring responsibilities.

The fellowship is named after the German mathematician Emmy Noether.

== Winners ==
The winners of the LMS Emmy Noether Fellowship have been:

- 2020 - Dr Milena Hering, University of Edinburgh
- 2020 - Dr Anne-Sophie Kaloghiros, Brunel University
- 2020 - Dr Irene Kyza, University of Dundee
- 2020 - Dr Cristina Manolache, University of Sheffield
