= Bivariant theory =

In mathematics, a bivariant theory was introduced by Fulton and MacPherson (Fulton & MacPherson 1981), in order to put a ring structure on the Chow group of a singular variety, the resulting ring called an operational Chow ring.

On technical levels, a bivariant theory is a mix of a homology theory, specifically Borel-Moore homology, and a cohomology theory. In general, a homology theory is a covariant functor from the category of spaces to the category of abelian groups, while a cohomology theory is a contravariant functor from the category of (nice) spaces to the category of rings. A bivariant theory is a functor both covariant and contravariant; hence, the name “bivariant”.

== Definition ==
Unlike a homology theory or a cohomology theory, a bivariant class is defined for a map not a space.

Let $f : X \to Y$ be a map. For such a map, we can consider the fiber square

$$\begin{matrix}
X' & \to & Y' \\
\downarrow & & \downarrow \\
X & \to & Y
\end{matrix}$$

(for example, a blow-up.) Intuitively, the consideration of all the fiber squares like the above can be thought of as an approximation of the map $f$.

Now, a birational class of $f$ is a family of group homomorphisms indexed by the fiber squares:

$$A_k Y' \to A_{k-p} X'$$

satisfying the certain compatibility conditions.

== Operational Chow ring ==
The basic question was whether there is a cycle map:

$$A^*(X) \to \operatorname{H}^*(X, \mathbb{Z}).$$

If X is smooth, such a map exists since $A^*(X)$ is the usual Chow ring of X. (Totaro 2014) has shown that rationally there is no such a map with good properties even if X is a linear variety, roughly a variety admitting a cell decomposition. He also notes that Voevodsky's motivic cohomology ring is "probably more useful" than the operational Chow ring for a singular scheme (§ 8 of loc. cit.)
