= Fermat quintic threefold =

Complex manifold

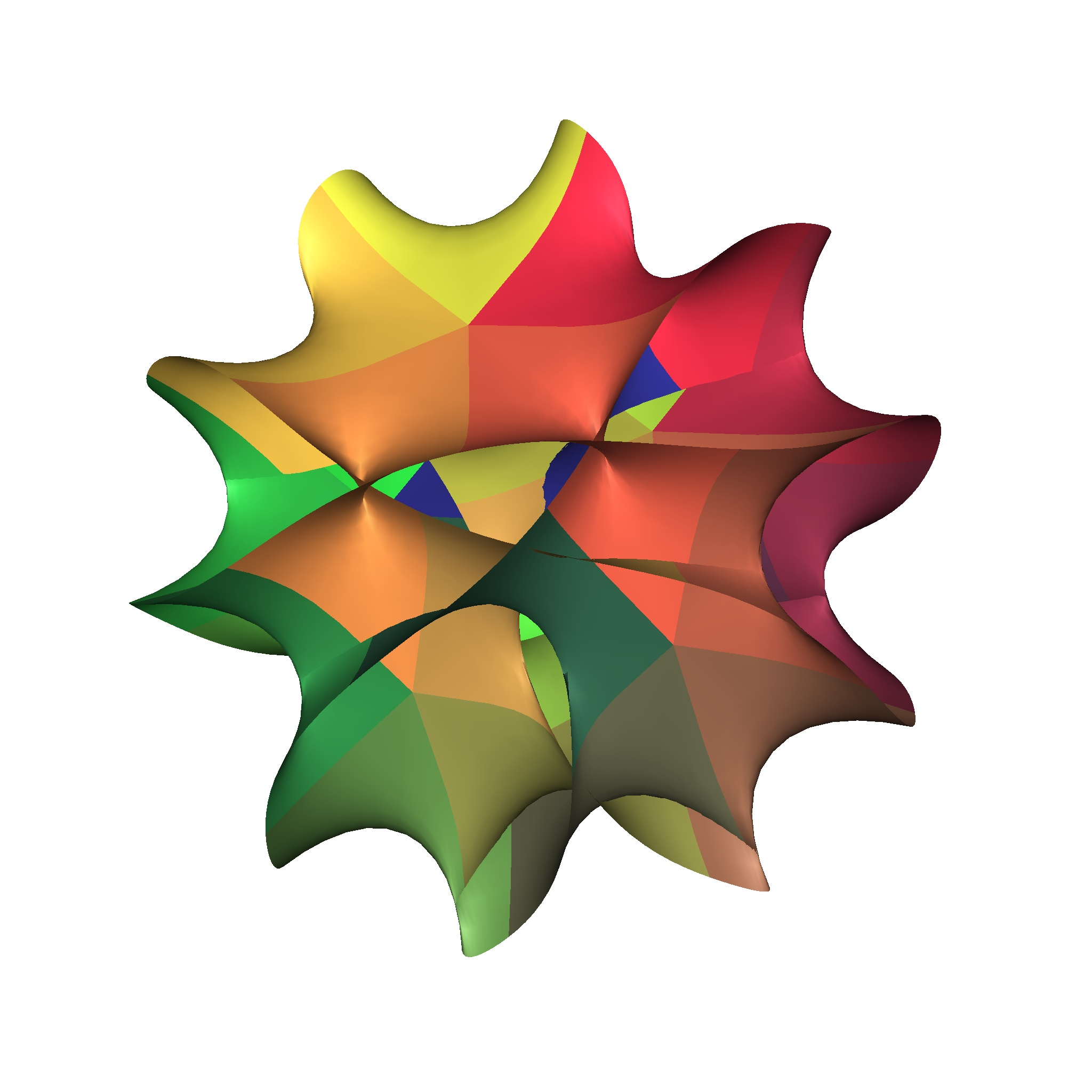
Two-dimensional cross-section of the Fermat quintic threefold

In mathematics, a Fermat quintic threefold is a special quintic threefold, in other words a degree 5, dimension 3 hypersurface in 4-dimensional complex projective space, given by the equation

$$V^5+W^5+X^5+Y^5+Z^5=0$$.

This threefold, so named after Pierre de Fermat, is a Calabi–Yau manifold.

The Hodge diamond of a non-singular quintic 3-fold is

			1
		0		0
	0		1		0
1		101		101		1
	0		1		0
		0		0
			1

== Rational curves ==
Herbert Clemens (1984) conjectured that the number of rational curves of a given degree on a generic quintic threefold is finite. The Fermat quintic threefold is not generic in this sense, and Alberto Albano and Sheldon Katz (1991) showed that its lines are contained in 50 1-dimensional families of the form

$$(x  : -\zeta x : ay : by : cy)$$

for $\zeta^5=1$ and $a^5+b^5+c^5=0$. There are 375 lines in more than one family, of the form

$$(x  : -\zeta x : y :-\eta y :0)$$

for fifth roots of unity $\zeta$ and $\eta$.
