= Anne-Sophie Kaloghiros =

Mathematics researcher i

- Education: University of Cambridge
- Awards: Emmy Noether Fellow 2020
- Scientific career
- Fields: Mathematics
- Workplaces: Brunel University London
- Doctoral advisor: Alessio Corti

Anne-Sophie Kaloghiros is a mathematics researcher in algebraic geometry and reader in Mathematics at Brunel University London. Kaloghiros was awarded the London Mathematical Society (LMS) Emmy Noether Fellowship in 2020.

== Professional career ==
Kaloghiros earned her BA in pure mathematics (honours) from the Université d’Orsay, Paris XI in 2001, a Degree of the Ecole Centrale Paris in 2003, and a Certificate of Advanced Studies in Mathematics, Part III (Distinction) at Queens’ College, University of Cambridge in 2003 as well.

Kaloghiros earned her PhD in Algebraic Geometry from University of Cambridge in 2007. Her dissertation, The Topology of Terminal Quartic 3-Folds, was supervised by Alessio Corti. She was a junior research fellow, Trinity Hall, University of Cambridge 2007–2011, a postdoctoral fellow, University of Cambridge in 2011, and research associate, Imperial College London 2012–2014. She has held visiting and postdoctoral positions at the Mathematical Sciences Research Institute (MSRI, Berkeley) in 2009 and 2019, at the Research Institute for Mathematical Sciences (RIMS, Kyoto University) 2009–2010, University of Illinois at Chicago in 2011, and the Hausdorff Research Institute for Mathematics (HIM, Bonn, Germany) in 2014. She is currently a senior lecturer in Maths/Op at Brunel University London. She is an expert on algebraic geometry and birational geometry. She serves on the London Mathematical Society Mentoring African Research in Mathematics (MARM) board.

== Awards and honors ==
Kaloghiros received the Brunel Athena Swan Award for 2017–2018. In 2020, she was awarded the London Mathematical Society (LMS) Emmy Noether Fellowship. Her research has been funded by the Heilbronn Institute for Mathematical Research, the Engineering and Physical Sciences Research Council (EPSRC), the London Mathematical Society, Edinburgh Mathematical Society, and Glasgow Mathematical Journal Trust.
