= Donaldson–Thomas theory =

Theory in physics

In mathematics, specifically algebraic geometry, Donaldson–Thomas theory is the theory of Donaldson–Thomas invariants. Given a compact moduli space of sheaves on a Calabi–Yau threefold, its Donaldson–Thomas invariant is the virtual number of its points, i.e., the integral of the cohomology class 1 against the virtual fundamental class. The Donaldson–Thomas invariant is a holomorphic analogue of the Casson invariant. The invariants were introduced by Simon Donaldson and Richard Thomas (1998). Donaldson–Thomas invariants have close connections to Gromov–Witten invariants of algebraic three-folds and the theory of stable pairs due to Rahul Pandharipande and Thomas.

Donaldson–Thomas theory is physically motivated by certain BPS states that occur in string and gauge theory^{pg 5}. This is due to the fact the invariants depend on a stability condition on the derived category $D^b(\mathcal{M})$ of the moduli spaces being studied. Essentially, these stability conditions correspond to points in the Kähler moduli space of a Calabi-Yau manifold, as considered in mirror symmetry, and the resulting subcategory $\mathcal{P} \subset D^b(\mathcal{M})$ is the category of BPS states for the corresponding SCFT.

== Definition and examples ==
The basic idea of Gromov–Witten invariants is to probe the geometry of a space by studying pseudoholomorphic maps from Riemann surfaces to a smooth target. The moduli stack of all such maps admits a virtual fundamental class, and intersection theory on this stack yields numerical invariants that can often contain enumerative information. In similar spirit, the approach of Donaldson–Thomas theory is to study curves in an algebraic three-fold by their equations. More accurately, by studying ideal sheaves on a space. This moduli space also admits a virtual fundamental class and yields certain numerical invariants that are enumerative.

Whereas in Gromov–Witten theory, maps are allowed to be multiple covers and collapsed components of the domain curve, Donaldson–Thomas theory allows for nilpotent information contained in the sheaves, however, these are integer valued invariants. There are deep conjectures due to Davesh Maulik, Andrei Okounkov, Nikita Nekrasov and Rahul Pandharipande, proved in increasing generality, that Gromov–Witten and Donaldson–Thomas theories of algebraic three-folds are actually equivalent. More concretely, their generating functions are equal after an appropriate change of variables. For Calabi–Yau threefolds, the Donaldson–Thomas invariants can be formulated as weighted Euler characteristic on the moduli space. There have also been recent connections between these invariants, the motivic Hall algebra, and the ring of functions on the quantum torus.

- The moduli space of lines on the quintic threefold is a discrete set of 2875 points. The virtual number of points is the actual number of points, and hence the Donaldson–Thomas invariant of this moduli space is the integer 2875.
- Similarly, the Donaldson–Thomas invariant of the moduli space of conics on the quintic is 609250.

=== Definition ===
For a Calabi–Yau threefold $Y$ and a fixed cohomology class $\alpha \in H^{\text{even}}(Y,\mathbb{Q})$ there is an associated moduli stack $\mathcal{M}(Y,\alpha)$ of coherent sheaves with Chern character $c(\mathcal{E}) = \alpha$. In general, this is a non-separated Artin stack of infinite type which is difficult to define numerical invariants upon it. Instead, there are open substacks $\mathcal{M}^{\sigma}(Y,\alpha)$ parametrizing such coherent sheaves $\mathcal{E}$ which have a stability condition $\sigma$ imposed upon them, i.e. $\sigma$-stable sheaves. These moduli stacks have much nicer properties, such as being separated of finite type. The only technical difficulty is they can have bad singularities due to the existence of obstructions of deformations of a fixed sheaf. In particular

$$\begin{align}
T_{[\mathcal{E}]}\mathcal{M}^\sigma(Y,\alpha) &\cong \text{Ext}^1(\mathcal{E},\mathcal{E}) \\
\text{Ob}_{[\mathcal{E}]}(\mathcal{M}^\sigma(Y,\alpha)) &\cong \text{Ext}^2(\mathcal{E},\mathcal{E})
\end{align}$$

Now because $Y$ is Calabi–Yau, Serre duality implies

$\text{Ext}^2(\mathcal{E},\mathcal{E}) \cong \text{Ext}^1(\mathcal{E},\mathcal{E}\otimes\omega_Y)^\vee \cong \text{Ext}^1(\mathcal{E},\mathcal{E})^\vee$

which gives a perfect obstruction theory of dimension 0. In particular, this implies the associated virtual fundamental class

$[\mathcal{M}^\sigma(Y,\alpha)]^{vir} \in H_0(\mathcal{M}^\sigma(Y,\alpha), \mathbb{Z})$

is in homological degree $0$. We can then define the DT invariant as

$\int_{[\mathcal{M}^\sigma(Y,\alpha)]^{vir}}1$

which depends upon the stability condition $\sigma$ and the cohomology class $\alpha$. It was proved by Thomas that for a smooth family $Y_t$ the invariant defined above does not change. At the outset researchers chose the Gieseker stability condition, but other DT-invariants in recent years have been studied based on other stability conditions, leading to wall-crossing formulas.

== Facts ==
- The Donaldson–Thomas invariant of the moduli space M is equal to the weighted Euler characteristic of M. The weight function associates to every point in M an analogue of the Milnor number of a hyperplane singularity.

== Generalizations ==
- Instead of moduli spaces of sheaves, one considers moduli spaces of derived category objects. That gives the Pandharipande–Thomas invariants that count stable pairs of a Calabi–Yau 3-fold.
- Instead of integer valued invariants, one considers motivic invariants.

== See also ==
- Enumerative geometry
- Gromov–Witten invariant
- Hilbert scheme
- Quantum cohomology
