= Masatake Kuranishi =

Japanese mathematician (1924–2021)

Masatake Kuranishi (倉西 正武 Kuranishi Masatake; July 19, 1924 – June 22, 2021) was a Japanese mathematician who worked on several complex variables, partial differential equations, and differential geometry.

== Education and career ==
Kuranishi received in 1952 his Ph.D. from Nagoya University. He became a lecturer there in 1951, an associate professor in 1952, and a full professor in 1958. From 1955 to 1956 he was a visiting scholar at the Institute for Advanced Study in Princeton, New Jersey. From 1956 to 1961 he was a visiting professor at the University of Chicago, the Massachusetts Institute of Technology, and Princeton University. He became a professor at Columbia University in the summer of 1961.

Kuranishi was an invited speaker at the International Congress of Mathematicians in 1962 at Stockholm with the talk On deformations of compact complex structures and in 1970 at Nice with the talk Convexity conditions related to 1/2 estimate on elliptic complexes. He was a Guggenheim Fellow for the academic year 1975–1976. In 2000 he received the Stefan Bergman Prize. In 2014 he received the Geometry Prize of the Mathematical Society of Japan.

== Research ==
Kuranishi and Élie Cartan established the eponymous Cartan–Kuranishi Theorem on the continuation of exterior differential forms. In 1962, based upon the work of Kunihiko Kodaira and Donald Spencer, Kuranishi constructed locally complete deformations of compact complex manifolds.

In 1982 he made important progress in the embedding problem for CR manifolds (Cauchy–Riemann structures).

In a series of deep papers published in 1982 [Kur I, II, III], Kuranishi developed the theory of harmonic integrals on strongly pseudoconvex CR structures over small balls along the line developed by D. C. Spencer, C. B. Morrey, J. J. Kohn and Nirenberg. He considered a strongly pseudoconvex CR structure on a manifold of real dimension $2 n - 1$. In [Kur I], he established the a priori estimate for the Neumann boundary problem on the complex associated with the structure, in the case the structure is induced by an embedding in $\mathbb{C}^{n}$ and restricted to a small ball of special type, provided $1 \le q \le n - 3$, where q is the degree of differential forms. In [Kur II], he developed the regularity theorem of solutions of the Neumann boundary problem based on the a priori estimate of [Kur I]. As a significant application of his deep theory, he proved in [Kur III] that, when $n \ge 5$, the structure is realized on a neighborhood of a reference point by an embedding in $\mathbb{C}^{n}$.

Thus, by Kuranishi's work, in real dimension 9 and higher, local embedding of abstract CR structures is true and is also true in real dimension 7 by the work of Akahori. A simplified presentation of Kuranishi's proof is due to Sidney Webster. For $n = 2$ (i.e., real dimension 3), Nirenberg published a counterexample. The local embedding problem remains open in real dimension 5.

== Selected publications ==
- Heisuke Hironaka (ed.): Masatake Kuranishi - Selected Papers, Springer 2010
- Kuranishi: Deformations of compact complex manifolds, Montreal, Presses de l'Universite de Montreal, 1971, 99 pages.
- Kuranishi: Lectures on involutive systems of partial differential equations, Sociedade de matemática de São Paulo, 1967, 75 pages.
- Kuranishi with notes by M.K. Venkatesha Murthy: Lectures on exterior differential systems, Tata Institute of Fundamental Research, 1962.

== See also ==
- Kuranishi structure
