= Chow group =

Analogs of homology groups for algebraic varieties

In algebraic geometry, the Chow groups (named after Wei-Liang Chow by Claude Chevalley (1958)) of an algebraic variety over any field are algebro-geometric analogs of the homology of a topological space. The elements of the Chow group are formed out of subvarieties (so-called algebraic cycles) in a similar way to how simplicial or cellular homology groups are formed out of subcomplexes. When the variety is smooth, the Chow groups can be interpreted as cohomology groups (compare Poincaré duality) and have a multiplication called the intersection product. The Chow groups carry rich information about an algebraic variety, and they are correspondingly hard to compute in general.

== Rational equivalence and Chow groups ==
For what follows, define a variety over a field $k$ to be an integral scheme of finite type over $k$. For any scheme $X$ of finite type over $k$, an algebraic cycle on $X$ means a finite linear combination of subvarieties of $X$ with integer coefficients. (Here and below, subvarieties are understood to be closed in $X$, unless stated otherwise.) For a natural number $i$, the group $Z_i(X)$ of $i$-dimensional cycles (or $i$-cycles, for short) on $X$ is the free abelian group on the set of $i$-dimensional subvarieties of $X$.

For a variety $W$ of dimension $i+1$ and any rational function $f$ on $W$ which is not identically zero, the divisor of $f$ is the $i$-cycle

$$(f) = \sum_Z \operatorname{ord}_Z (f) Z,$$

where the sum runs over all $i$-dimensional subvarieties $Z$ of $W$ and the integer $\operatorname{ord}_Z(f)$ denotes the order of vanishing of $f$ along $Z$. (Thus $\operatorname{ord}_Z(f)$ is negative if $f$ has a pole along $Z$.) The definition of the order of vanishing requires some care for $W$ singular.

For a scheme $X$ of finite type over $k$, the group of $i$-cycles rationally equivalent to zero is the subgroup of $Z_i(X)$ generated by the cycles $(f)$ for all $(i+1)$-dimensional subvarieties $W$ of $X$ and all nonzero rational functions $f$ on $W$. The Chow group $CH_i(X)$ of $i$-dimensional cycles on $X$ is the quotient group of $Z_i(X)$ by the subgroup of cycles rationally equivalent to zero. Sometimes one writes $[Z]$ for the class of a subvariety $Z$ in the Chow group, and if two subvarieties $Z$ and $W$ have $[Z] = [W]$, then $Z$ and $W$ are said to be rationally equivalent.

For example, when $X$ is a variety of dimension $n$, the Chow group $CH_{n-1}(X)$ is the divisor class group of $X$. When $X$ is smooth over $k$ (or more generally, a locally Noetherian normal factorial scheme), this is isomorphic to the Picard group of line bundles on $X$.

=== Examples of Rational Equivalence ===
==== Rational Equivalence on Projective Space ====
Rationally equivalent cycles defined by hypersurfaces are easy to construct on projective space because they can all be constructed as the vanishing loci of the same vector bundle. For example, given two homogeneous polynomials of degree $d$, so $f,g \in H^0(\mathbb{P}^n, \mathcal O(d))$, we can construct a family of hypersurfaces defined as the vanishing locus of $sf + tg$. Schematically, this can be constructed as

$$X = \text{Proj}\left( \frac{\mathbb{C}[s,t][x_0,\ldots,x_n]}{(sf + tg)}\right) \hookrightarrow \mathbb{P}^1 \times \mathbb{P}^n$$

using the projection $\pi_1: X \to \mathbb{P}^1$ we can see the fiber over a point $[s_0:t_0]$ is the projective hypersurface defined by $s_0 f + t_0 g$. This can be used to show that the cycle class of every hypersurface of degree $d$ is rationally equivalent to $d[\mathbb{P}^{n-1}]$, since $sf + tx_0^d$ can be used to establish a rational equivalence. Notice that the locus of $x_0^d=0$ is $\mathbb{P}^{n-1}$ and it has multiplicity $d$, which is the coefficient of its cycle class.

==== Rational Equivalence of Cycles on a Curve ====
If we take two distinct line bundles $L, L' \in\operatorname{Pic}(C)$ of a smooth projective curve $C$, then the vanishing loci of a generic section of both line bundles defines non-equivalent cycle classes in $CH(C)$. This is because $\operatorname{Div}(C) \cong \operatorname{Pic}(C)$ for smooth varieties, so the divisor classes of $s \in H^0(C, L)$ and $s' \in H^0(C, L')$ define inequivalent classes.

== The Chow ring ==
When the scheme $X$ is smooth over a field $k$, the Chow groups form a ring, not just a graded abelian group. Namely, when $X$ is smooth over $k$, define $CH^i(X)$ to be the Chow group of codimension-$i$ cycles on $X$. (When $X$ is a variety of dimension $n$, this just means that $CH^i(X) = CH_{n-i}(X)$.) Then the groups $CH^*(X)$ form a commutative graded ring with the product:

$$CH^i(X) \times CH^j(X) \rightarrow CH^{i+j}(X).$$

The product arises from intersecting algebraic cycles. For example, if $Y$ and $Z$ are smooth subvarieties of $X$ of codimension $i$ and $j$ respectively, and if $Y$ and $Z$ intersect transversely, then the product $[Y][Z]$ in $CH^{i+j}(X)$ is the sum of the irreducible components of the intersection $Y\cap Z$, which all have codimension $i+j$.

More generally, in various cases, intersection theory constructs an explicit cycle that represents the product $[Y][Z]$ in the Chow ring. For example, if $Y$ and $Z$ are subvarieties of complementary dimension (meaning that their dimensions sum to the dimension of $X$) whose intersection has dimension zero, then $[Y][Z]$ is equal to the sum of the points of the intersection with coefficients called intersection numbers. For any subvarieties $Y$ and $Z$ of a smooth scheme $X$ over $k$, with no assumption on the dimension of the intersection, William Fulton and Robert MacPherson's intersection theory constructs a canonical element of the Chow groups of $Y\cap Z$ whose image in the Chow groups of $X$ is the product $[Y][Z]$.

== Examples ==
=== Projective space ===
The Chow ring of projective space $\mathbb P^n$ over any field $k$ is the ring

$$CH^*(\mathbb P^n) \cong \mathbf Z[H]/(H^{n + 1}),$$

where $H$ is the class of a hyperplane (the zero locus of a single linear function). Furthermore, any subvariety $Y$ of degree $d$ and codimension $a$ in projective space is rationally equivalent to $dH^a$. It follows that for any two subvarieties $Y$ and $Z$ of complementary dimension in $\mathbb P^n$ and degrees $a$, $b$, respectively, their product in the Chow ring is simply

$$[Y] \cdot [Z] = a\, b\, H^n$$

where $H^n$ is the class of a $k$-rational point in $\mathbb P^n$. For example, if $Y$ and $Z$ intersect transversely, it follows that $Y\cap Z$ is a zero-cycle of degree $ab$. If the base field $k$ is algebraically closed, this means that there are exactly $ab$ points of intersection; this is a version of Bézout's theorem, a classic result of enumerative geometry.

=== Projective bundle formula ===
Given a vector bundle $E \to X$ of rank $r$ over a smooth proper scheme $X$ over a field, the Chow ring of the associated projective bundle $\mathbb{P}(E)$ can be computed using the Chow ring of $X$ and the Chern classes of $E$. If we let $\zeta = c_1(\mathcal O_{\mathbb{P}(E)}(1))$ and $c_1,\ldots, c_r$ the Chern classes of $E$, then there is an isomorphism of rings

$$CH^\bullet(\mathbb{P}(E)) \cong \frac{CH^\bullet(X)[\zeta]}{\zeta^r + c_1\zeta^{r-1} + c_2\zeta^{r-2} + \cdots + c_r}$$

==== Hirzebruch surfaces ====
For example, the Chow ring of a Hirzebruch surface can be readily computed using the projective bundle formula. Recall that it is constructed as $F_a = \mathbb{P}(\mathcal{O}\oplus\mathcal{O}(a))$ over $\mathbb{P}^1$. Then, the only non-trivial Chern class of this vector bundle is $c_1 = aH$. This implies that the Chow ring is isomorphic to

$$CH^\bullet(F_a) \cong \frac{CH^\bullet(\mathbb{P}^1)[\zeta]}{(\zeta^2 + aH\zeta)} \cong \frac{\mathbf Z[H,\zeta]}{(H^2, \zeta^2+aH\zeta)}$$

=== Remarks ===
For other algebraic varieties, Chow groups can have richer behavior. For example, let $X$ be an elliptic curve over a field $k$. Then the Chow group of zero-cycles on $X$ fits into an exact sequence

$$0 \rightarrow X(k) \rightarrow CH_0(X) \rightarrow \mathbf{Z} \rightarrow 0.$$

Thus the Chow group of an elliptic curve $X$ is closely related to the group $X(k)$ of $k$-rational points of $X$. When $k$ is a number field, $X(k)$ is called the Mordell–Weil group of $X$, and some of the deepest problems in number theory are attempts to understand this group. When $k$ is the complex numbers, the example of an elliptic curve shows that Chow groups can be uncountable abelian groups.

== Functoriality ==
For a proper morphism $f: X\to Y$ of schemes over $k$, there is a pushforward homomorphism $f_*: CH_i(X)\to CH_i(Y)$ for each integer $i$. For example, for a proper scheme $X$ over $k$, this gives a homomorphism $CH_0(X)\to \mathbf Z$, which takes a closed point in $X$ to its degree over $k$. (A closed point in $X$ has the form $\operatorname{Spec}(E)$ for a finite extension field $E$ of $k$, and its degree means the degree of the field $E$ over $k$.)

For a flat morphism $f: X\to Y$ of schemes over $k$ with fibers of dimension $r$ (possibly empty), there is a homomorphism $f^*: CH_i(Y)\to CH_{i+r}(X)$.

A key computational tool for Chow groups is the localization sequence, as follows. For a scheme $X$ over a field $k$ and a closed subscheme $Z$ of $X$, there is an exact sequence

$$CH_i(Z) \rightarrow CH_i(X) \rightarrow CH_i(X-Z) \rightarrow 0,$$

where the first homomorphism is the pushforward associated to the proper morphism $Z\to X$, and the second homomorphism is pullback with respect to the flat morphism $X - Z \to X$. The localization sequence can be extended to the left using a generalization of Chow groups, (Borel–Moore) motivic homology groups, also known as higher Chow groups.

For any morphism $f: X\to Y$ of smooth schemes over $k$, there is a pullback homomorphism $f^*: CH^i(Y)\to CH^i(X)$, which is in fact a ring homomorphism $CH^*(Y)\to CH^*(X)$.

=== Examples of flat pullbacks ===
Note that non-examples can be constructed using blowups; for example, if we take the blowup of the origin in $\mathbb{A}^2$ then the fiber over the origin is isomorphic to $\mathbb{P}^1$.

==== Branched coverings of curves ====
Consider the branched covering of curves

$$f: \operatorname{Spec}\left( \frac{\mathbb{C}[x,y]}{(f(x) - g(x,y))} \right) \to \mathbb{A}^1_x$$

Since the morphism ramifies whenever $f(\alpha) = 0$ we get a factorization

$$g(\alpha,y) = (y - a_1)^{e_1}\cdots(y-a_k)^{e_k}$$

where one of the $e_i>1$. This implies that the points $\{\alpha_1,\ldots,\alpha_k \} = f^{-1}(\alpha)$ have multiplicities $e_1,\ldots,e_k$ respectively. The flat pullback of the point $\alpha$ is then

$$f^*[\alpha] = e_1[\alpha] + \cdots + e_k[\alpha_k]$$

==== Flat family of varieties ====
Consider a flat family of varieties

$$X \to S$$

and a subvariety $S' \subset S$. Then, using the cartesian square

$$\begin{matrix}
S'\times_{S} X & \to & X \\
\downarrow & & \downarrow \\
S' & \to & S
\end{matrix}$$

we see that the image of $S'\times_{S} X$ is a subvariety of $X$. Therefore, we have

$$f^*[S'] = [S'\times_S X]$$

== Cycle maps ==
There are several homomorphisms (known as cycle maps) from Chow groups to more computable theories.

First, for a scheme X over the complex numbers, there is a homomorphism from Chow groups to Borel–Moore homology:

$$\mathit{CH}_i(X) \rightarrow H_{2i}^{BM}(X,\mathbf{Z}).$$

The factor of 2 appears because an i-dimensional subvariety of X has real dimension 2i. When X is smooth over the complex numbers, this cycle map can be rewritten using Poincaré duality as a homomorphism

$$\mathit{CH}^j(X) \rightarrow H^{2j}(X,\mathbf{Z}).$$

In this case (X smooth over C), these homomorphisms form a ring homomorphism from the Chow ring to the cohomology ring. Intuitively, this is because the products in both the Chow ring and the cohomology ring describe the intersection of cycles.

For a smooth complex projective variety, the cycle map from the Chow ring to ordinary cohomology factors through a richer theory, Deligne cohomology. This incorporates the Abel–Jacobi map from cycles homologically equivalent to zero to the intermediate Jacobian. The exponential sequence shows that CH^{1}(X) maps isomorphically to Deligne cohomology, but that fails for CH^{j}(X) with j > 1.

For a scheme X over an arbitrary field k, there is an analogous cycle map from Chow groups to (Borel–Moore) etale homology. When X is smooth over k, this homomorphism can be identified with a ring homomorphism from the Chow ring to etale cohomology.

== Relation to K-theory ==
An (algebraic) vector bundle E on a smooth scheme X over a field has Chern classes c_{i}(E) in CH^{i}(X), with the same formal properties as in topology. The Chern classes give a close connection between vector bundles and Chow groups. Namely, let K_{0}(X) be the Grothendieck group of vector bundles on X. As part of the Grothendieck–Riemann–Roch theorem, Grothendieck showed that the Chern character gives an isomorphism

$$K_0(X)\otimes_{\mathbf{Z}}\mathbf{Q} \cong \prod_i \mathit{CH}^i(X)\otimes_{\mathbf{Z}}\mathbf{Q}.$$

This isomorphism shows the importance of rational equivalence, compared to any other adequate equivalence relation on algebraic cycles.

== Conjectures ==
Some of the deepest conjectures in algebraic geometry and number theory are attempts to understand Chow groups. For example:

- The Mordell–Weil theorem implies that the divisor class group CH_{n-1}(X) is finitely generated for any variety X of dimension n over a number field. It is an open problem whether all Chow groups are finitely generated for every variety over a number field. The Bloch–Kato conjecture on values of L-functions predicts that these groups are finitely generated. Moreover, the rank of the group of cycles modulo homological equivalence, and also of the group of cycles homologically equivalent to zero, should be equal to the order of vanishing of an L-function of the given variety at certain integer points. Finiteness of these ranks would also follow from the Bass conjecture in algebraic K-theory.
- For a smooth complex projective variety X, the Hodge conjecture predicts the image (tensored with the rationals Q) of the cycle map from the Chow groups to singular cohomology. For a smooth projective variety over a finitely generated field (such as a finite field or number field), the Tate conjecture predicts the image (tensored with Q_{l}) of the cycle map from Chow groups to l-adic cohomology.
- For a smooth projective variety X over any field, the Bloch–Beilinson conjecture predicts a filtration on the Chow groups of X (tensored with the rationals) with strong properties. The conjecture would imply a tight connection between the singular or etale cohomology of X and the Chow groups of X.

For example, let X be a smooth complex projective surface. The Chow group of zero-cycles on X maps onto the integers by the degree homomorphism; let K be the kernel. If the geometric genus h^{0}(X, Ω^{2}) is not zero, Mumford showed that K is "infinite-dimensional" (not the image of any finite-dimensional family of zero-cycles on X). The Bloch–Beilinson conjecture would imply a satisfying converse, Bloch's conjecture on zero-cycles: for a smooth complex projective surface X with geometric genus zero, K should be finite-dimensional; more precisely, it should map isomorphically to the group of complex points of the Albanese variety of X.

== Variants ==
=== Bivariant theory ===
Fulton and MacPherson extended the Chow ring to singular varieties by defining the "operational Chow ring" and more generally a bivariant theory associated to any morphism of schemes. A bivariant theory is a pair of covariant and contravariant functors that assign to a map a group and a ring respectively. It generalizes a cohomology theory, which is a contravariant functor that assigns to a space a ring, namely a cohomology ring. The name "bivariant" refers to the fact that the theory contains both covariant and contravariant functors.

This is in a sense the most elementary extension of the Chow ring to singular varieties; other theories such as motivic cohomology map to the operational Chow ring.

=== Other variants ===
Arithmetic Chow groups are an amalgamation of Chow groups of varieties over Q together with a component encoding Arakelov-theoretical information, that is, differential forms on the associated complex manifold.

The theory of Chow groups of schemes of finite type over a field extends easily to that of algebraic spaces. The key advantage of this extension is that it is easier to form quotients in the latter category and thus it is more natural to consider equivariant Chow groups of algebraic spaces. A much more formidable extension is that of Chow group of a stack, which has been constructed only in some special case and which is needed in particular to make sense of a virtual fundamental class.

== History ==
Rational equivalence of divisors (known as linear equivalence) was studied in various forms during the 19th century, leading to the ideal class group in number theory and the Jacobian variety in the theory of algebraic curves. For higher-codimension cycles, rational equivalence was introduced by Francesco Severi in the 1930s. In 1956, Wei-Liang Chow gave an influential proof that the intersection product is well-defined on cycles modulo rational equivalence for a smooth quasi-projective variety, using Chow's moving lemma. Starting in the 1970s, Fulton and MacPherson gave the current standard foundation for Chow groups, working with singular varieties wherever possible. In their theory, the intersection product for smooth varieties is constructed by deformation to the normal cone.

== See also ==
- Intersection theory
- Grothendieck–Riemann–Roch theorem
- Hodge conjecture
- Motive (algebraic geometry)
