= Werner Gysin =

Swiss mathematician (1915–1998)

Werner Gysin (15 July 1915 – 1998) was a Swiss mathematician who introduced the Gysin sequence and Gysin homomorphism in his only published paper (Gysin 1942).

Gysin obtained his Ph.D. from ETH Zurich in 1941 with a thesis written under the direction of Heinz Hopf and Eduard Stiefel.
