= Stable map =

In mathematics, specifically in symplectic geometry and algebraic geometry, the moduli spaces of stable maps generalise the moduli spaces of curves, allowing the study of the geometry of curves with respect to their position in some larger space $X$. This is done by considering ways of embedding curves into $X$, via a special kind of function called a stable map. The word "stable", like in the case of stable curves, means that these maps have only a finite number of automorphisms, which is important for the construction of a "space of all curves (of a certain type) in $X$" - that is, a moduli space.

By "marking" a certain number of points on the embedded curves, and considering where these are positioned in the ambient space $X$, we can calculate the Gromov–Witten invariants, which find application in enumerative geometry and type IIA string theory. The idea of stable maps was proposed by Maxim Kontsevich around 1992 and published in Kontsevich (1995).

There are two competing points of view: those of algebraic and symplectic geometry. This article aims to treat both; the word "curve" refers both to (complex) algebraic curves and to Riemann surfaces, and the ambient space $X$ can be taken either as a smooth projective variety or as a closed symplectic manifold (equipped with a symplectic form $\omega$ and an almost complex structure $J$ satisfying a certain "compatibility condition" known as $\omega$-tameness, defined below).

Throughout this article $X$ denotes a fixed ambient space as above, and $g, n$ are nonnegative integers.

== Algebraic definition ==
Consider a nodal curve $C$ of genus $g$ and with $n$ distinct marked smooth points $p_1, \ldots, p_n \in C$. The curve $C$ is required to be connected, but may be made up of several irreducible components joined to one another at the nodes. We say a point is a special point if it is either a marked point or a node.

A morphism $f: C \to X$ is a stable map if every irreducible component of $C$ which is contracted by $f$ (that is, every component on which $f$ is constant) is itself a stable curve. This is equivalent to saying that contracted genus 0 components must have 3 or more special points, and contracted genus 1 components must have at least 1 special point. We typically write $(C, p_1, \ldots, p_n, f)$ for such a map.

We say that two stable maps $(C, p_1, \ldots, p_n, f)$ and $(\tilde C, q_1, \ldots, q_n, \tilde f)$ are isomorphic if there is an isomorphism of curves $\tau: C \to \tilde C$ such that $\tau(p_i) = q_i$ for all indices $i$, and such that $\tilde f \circ \tau = f$. The above stability condition is then equivalent to saying that the group of automorphisms of $f$ is finite.

With this in mind, we may construct moduli spaces of stable maps. Let $\beta \in H_2(X, \mathbb{Z})$ be the homology class of a curve. The corresponding (compact) moduli space $\overline{M}_{g,n}(X, \beta)$ consists of (isomorphism classes of) stable maps $(C, p_1 \ldots, p_n, f)$ such that $f_*[C] = \beta$. The (possibly empty) open subset
$$M_{g,n}(X, \beta) = \{ (C, p_1, \ldots, p_n, f) \in \overline{M}_{g,n}(X, \beta) \mid C \text{ is a smooth curve} \} / {\cong}$$
also has a moduli space structure, but is not compact.

It is significant that the domain of a stable map need not be a stable curve. However, one can contract its unstable components (iteratively) to produce a stable curve.

== In symplectic geometry ==
The symplectic case is more subtle, and requires some setup that was not needed for the algebraic case. We introduce the concepts of $\omega$-tameness and (perturbed) $J$-holomorphic curves:

We say that the almost complex structure $J$ on $X$ is $\omega$-tame if, for every nonzero $v \in TX$, we have $\omega(v, Jv) > 0$. We assume from now on that $J$ has this property.

Let $C$ be a Riemann surface with complex structure $j$. Let $pr_C, pr_X$ be the projection maps from $C \times X$ onto each of its factors. A smooth map $f:C \to X$ is called a perturbed $J$-holomorphic curve if it satisfies
$$\frac{1}{2} (df + J \circ df \circ j) = \nu,$$
for some conjugate-linear map $\nu : pr_C^* TC \to pr_X^* TX$. This is often written as $\bar\partial_J(f) = \nu$ for short. This is a perturbed form of the Cauchy-Riemann equations; setting $\nu=0$ gives the usual Cauchy-Riemann equations, and the definition of a $J$-holomorphic curve.

Let $\beta \in H_2(X, \mathbb{Z})$. We want to define a space of maps from Riemann surfaces into $X$, such that the fundamental class of the surface is pushed forward to $\beta$. One way to do this is by considering the space (Note: For technical reasons, it is actually necessary to work with a multiple cover of the space of stable marked curves, and to restrict to the subset of this multiple cover consisting of those curves with only trivial automorphisms.)
$$M_{g,n}(J, \nu, \beta) = \{ f : (C, p_1, \ldots, p_n) \to X \mid \bar\partial_J(f) = \nu, f_*[C] = \beta \} / {\cong}$$
where $(C, p_1, \ldots, p_n)$ is a (smooth) stable genus $g$ Riemann surface with $n$ marked points. This may be considered the symplectic analogue of the (noncompact) algebraic moduli space $M_{g,n}(X, \beta)$. However, since the domain is required to be stable, we must have $2g - 2 + n > 0$ (no stable curves exist otherwise).

We say that $X$ is semipositive if, for every homology class $\beta \in H_2(X, \mathbb{Z})$ which can arise as the pushforward of the fundamental class of the sphere $S^2$ under a map $S^2 \to X$, we never have
$$\int_\beta \omega > 0 \, \text{ and } \, 3-\frac{1}{2}\dim_\mathbb{R}X \leq \int_\beta c_1(TX) < 0.$$
When $X$ is semipositive, $M_{g,n}(J, \nu, \beta)$ has a natural compactification, called the Gromov-Uhlenbeck compactification. A stable map in the sense of symplectic geometry can then be considered an element of this compactified space.

== Examples ==
- For any positive integer $m$, the space $\overline{M}_{0,0}(\mathbb{P}^m, 1)$ consists of degree 1 maps $\mathbb{P}^1 \to \mathbb{P}^m$, where the domain has no marked points. Such a map contracts no components of the domain (of which there is only one), and so is stable. This space is the Grassmannian $\mathbf{Gr}(\mathbb{P}^1, \mathbb{P}^m)$ parametrizing all lines in $\mathbb{P}^m$.
- For any nonnegative integer $d$, the space $\overline{M}_{0,0}(\mathbb{P}^2, d)$ is the space of degree $d$ plane curves, and is of dimension $3d-1$. Spaces like this can be used to answer questions in enumerative geometry such as: how many degree $d$ plane curves pass through $3d-1$ general points?

== Properties ==
- The space $M_{g,n}(J, \nu, \beta)$ is a manifold of (real) dimension
  $$2\int_\beta c_1(TX) + 2(\frac{1}{2}\dim_\mathbb{R} X - 3)(1-g) + 2n.$$
- The space $\overline{M}_{g,n}(X, \beta)$ may be considered as the coarse moduli space of a Deligne-Mumford stack; this coarse moduli space is a projective scheme over $\mathbb{C}$.
- In general, $\overline{M}_{g,n}(X,\beta)$ may be reducible, non-reduced, and of impure dimension. However, when $X$ is convex - that is, when $h^1(C, f^*TX) = 0$ for every genus 0 stable map $(C, p_1, \ldots, p_n, f)$ - the space $\overline{M}_{0,n}(X, \beta)$ is well-behaved, and has (complex) dimension
  $$\int_\beta c_1(TX) + \dim_\mathbb{C} X - 3 + n.$$
- Even when $\overline{M}_{g,n}(X,\beta)$ does not have a well-defined dimension, we may define its virtual dimension as
  $$\operatorname{vdim} \overline{M}_{g,n}(X, \beta) = \int_\beta c_1(TX) + (\dim_\mathbb{C} X - 3)(1-g) + n.$$
  This coincides with the real dimension of $M_{g,n}(J, \nu, \beta)$ and, in the convex case, the dimension of $\overline{M}_{0,n}(X, \beta)$. The virtual fundamental class of $\overline{M} := \overline{M}_{g,n}(X,\beta)$, which is important for the definition of algebraic Gromov-Witten invariants, lives in the homology vector space $H_{\operatorname{vdim} \overline{M}} (\overline{M}, \mathbb{Q})$.
- When $\beta = 0$, the image of a stable map is just a point in $X$, so we have $\overline{M}_{g,n}(X, 0) \cong \overline{M}_{g,n} \times X$ via the map $(C, p_1, \ldots, p_n, f) \to (C, f(C))$. In particular, this space is nonempty only if $\overline{M}_{g,n}$ exists, i.e. if $2g - 2 + n > 0$.
- There are $n$ "evaluation maps" $\operatorname{ev}_i: \overline{M}_{g,n}(X,\beta) \to X$ sending $(C, p_1, \ldots, p_n, f)$ to $f(p_i)$. These are also used in the definition of Gromov-Witten invariants, as they allow the pulling back of cohomology classes from $X$ to $\overline{M}_{g,n}(X,\beta)$.

== Stabilisation and bubbling ==
It is not immediately clear that the moduli space $\overline{M}_{g, n}(X, \beta)$ is compact, as there are several problems that can occur when taking the limit of a family in this space. Possible issues are:

- Two marked points converge to the same point
- A marked point converges to a node
- Two nodes converge to the same point, creating a triple point
- The map becomes constant on an unstable component of the domain

These can all be dealt with through a two-step process. The first step is known as bubbling and solves problems caused by misplaced markings or triple points: we attach a copy of $\mathbb{P}^1$ (a sphere), called a bubble, to the domain curve at the problematic point. If the problem involves a node, this bubble separates the two components that were joined by that node. Any markings that were present at the problem point are moved onto the bubble - this ensures that it is stable, so we may extend the original map to this new curve by defining it to be constant on the bubble. The second step consists of contracting any unstable-but-contracted components of the domain curve.

The result may still not be stable, but the process can be applied iteratively, eventually giving a new stable map which may be taken as the "limit" of the family in $\overline{M}_{g, n}(X, \beta)$.
