= Virtual fundamental class =

In mathematics, specifically enumerative geometry and symplectic geometry, the virtual fundamental class $[X]^\text{vir} \in H_*(X)$ of a (typically very singular) space $X$ (or a stack) is a generalization of the classical fundamental class of a smooth manifold which has better behavior with respect to the enumerative problems being considered. In this way, there exists a cycle with can be used for answering specific enumerative problems, such as the number of degree $d$ rational curves on a quintic threefold. For example, in Gromov–Witten theory, the Kontsevich moduli spaces

$\overline{\mathcal{M}}_{g,n}(X,\beta)$

for $X$ a smooth complex projective variety (or a symplectic manifold) $\beta \in H_2(X)$ a curve class, could have wild singularities such as^{pg 503} having higher-dimensional components at the boundary than on the main space. One such example is in the moduli space

$\overline{\mathcal{M}}_{1,n}(\mathbb{P}^2,1[H])$

for $H$ the class of a line in $\mathbb{P}^2$. The non-compact "smooth" component is empty, but the boundary contains maps of curves

$f:C \to \mathbb{P}^2$

whose components consist of one degree 3 curve which contracts to a point. There is a virtual fundamental class which can then be used to count the number of curves in this family.

== Geometric motivation ==
We can understand the motivation for the definition of the virtual fundamental class^{pg 10} by considering what situation should be emulated for a simple case (such as a smooth complete intersection). Suppose we have a variety $X$ (representing the coarse space of some moduli problem $\mathcal{X}$) which is cut out from an ambient smooth space $Y$ by a section $s$ of a rank-$r$ vector bundle $E \to Y$. Then $X$ has "virtual dimension" $(n-r)$ (where $n$ is the dimension of $Y$). This is the case if $s$ is a transverse section, but if $s$ is not, and it lies within a sub-bundle $E'\subset E$ where it is transverse, then we can get a homology cycle by looking at the Euler class of the cokernel bundle $E/E'$ over $X$. This bundle acts as the normal bundle of $X$ in $Y$.

Now, this situation dealt with in Fulton-MacPherson intersection theory by looking at the induced cone $E|_X$ and looking at the intersection of the induced section $s$ on the induced cone and the zero section, giving a cycle on $X$. If there is no obvious ambient space $Y$ for which there is an embedding, we must rely upon deformation theory techniques to construct this cycle on the moduli space representing the fundamental class. Now in the case where we have the section $s:Y\to E$ cutting out $X$, there is a four term exact sequence

$0 \to T_X \to T_Y|_X \xrightarrow{ds}E|_X \to \text{ob} \to 0$

where the last term represents the "obstruction sheaf". For the general case there is an exact sequence

$0 \to\mathcal{T}_1 \to E_1 \to E_2 \to \mathcal{T}_2 \to 0$

where $E_1, E_2$ act similarly to $T_Y|_X , E|_X$ and $\mathcal{T}_1,\mathcal{T}_2$ act as the tangent and obstruction sheaves. Note the construction of Behrend-Fantechi is a dualization of the exact sequence given from the concrete example above^{pg 44}.

== Remark on definitions and special cases ==
There are multiple definitions of virtual fundamental classes, all of which are subsumed by the definition for morphisms of Deligne-Mumford stacks using the intrinsic normal cone and a perfect obstruction theory, but the first definitions are more amenable for constructing lower-brow examples for certain kinds of schemes, such as ones with components of varying dimension. In this way, the structure of the virtual fundamental classes becomes more transparent, giving more intuition for their behavior and structure.

== Virtual fundamental class of an embedding into a smooth scheme ==
One of the first definitions of a virtual fundamental class^{pg 10} is for the following case: suppose we have an embedding of a scheme $X$ into a smooth scheme $Y$

$i : X \hookrightarrow Y$

and a vector bundle (called the obstruction bundle)

$\pi:E_{X/Y} \to X$

such that the normal cone $C_{X/Y}$ embeds into $E_{X/Y}$ over $X$. One natural candidate for such an obstruction bundle if given by

$E_{X/Y} = \bigoplus_{j=1}^r i^*\mathcal{O}_Y(-D_j)$

for the divisors associated to a non-zero set of generators $f_1,\ldots, f_r$ for the ideal $\mathcal{I}_{X/Y}$. Then, we can construct the virtual fundamental class of $X$ using the generalized Gysin morphism given by the composition

$A_*(Y) \xrightarrow{\sigma} A_*(C_{X/Y}) \xrightarrow{i_*} A_*(E_{X/Y}) \xrightarrow{ 0^!_{E_{X/Y}}} A_{*-r}(X)$

denoted $f_{E_{X/Y}}^!$, where $\sigma$ is the map given by

$\sigma([V]) = [C_{V\cap X}V]$

and $0^!_{E_{X/Y}}$ is the inverse of the flat pullback isomorphism

$\pi^*:A_{k-r}(X) \to A_{k}(E_{X/Y})$.

Here we use the $0$ in the map since it corresponds to the zero section of vector bundle. Then, the virtual fundamental class of the previous setup is defined as

$[X]^\text{vir}_{E_{X/Y}} := f_{E_{X/Y}}^!([Y])$

which is just the generalized Gysin morphism of the fundamental class of $Y$.

=== Remarks on the construction ===
The first map in the definition of the Gysin morphism corresponds to specializing to the normal cone^{pg 89}, which is essentially the first part of the standard Gysin morphism, as defined in Fulton^{pg 90}. But, because we are not working with smooth varieties, Fulton's cone construction doesn't work, since it would give $C_{X/Y} \cong N_{X/Y}$, hence the normal bundle could act as the obstruction bundle. In this way, the intermediate step of using the specialization of the normal cone only keeps the intersection-theoretic data of $Y$ relevant to the variety $X$.

== See also ==
- Chow group of a stack
