= Stable curve =

Asymptotically stable in the sense of geometric invariant theory

In algebraic geometry, a stable curve is an algebraic curve that is asymptotically stable in the sense of geometric invariant theory.

This is equivalent to the condition that it is a complete connected curve whose only singularities are ordinary double points and whose automorphism group is finite. The condition that the automorphism group is finite can be replaced by the condition that it is not of arithmetic genus one and every non-singular rational component meets the other components in at least 3 points (Deligne & Mumford 1969).

A semi-stable curve is one satisfying similar conditions, except that the automorphism group is allowed to be reductive rather than finite (or equivalently its connected component may be a torus). Alternatively the condition that non-singular rational components meet the other components in at least three points is replaced by the condition that they meet in at least two points.

Similarly a curve with a finite number of marked points is called stable if it is complete, connected, has only ordinary double points as singularities, and has finite automorphism group. For example, an elliptic curve (a non-singular genus 1 curve with 1 marked point) is stable.

Over the complex numbers, a connected curve is stable if and only if, after removing all singular and marked points, the universal covers of all its components are isomorphic to the unit disk.

== Definition ==
Given an arbitrary scheme $S$ and setting $g \geq 2$ a stable genus g curve over $S$ is defined as a proper flat morphism $\pi: C \to S$ such that the geometric fibers are reduced, connected 1-dimensional schemes $C_s$ such that

1. $C_s$ has only ordinary double-point singularities
2. Every rational component $E$ meets other components at more than $2$ points
3. $\dim H^1(\mathcal{O}_{C_s}) = g$

These technical conditions are necessary because (1) reduces the technical complexity (also Picard-Lefschetz theory can be used here), (2) rigidifies the curves so that there are no infinitesimal automorphisms of the moduli stack constructed later on, and (3) guarantees that the arithmetic genus of every fiber is the same. Note that for (1) the types of singularities found in elliptic surfaces can be completely classified.

=== Examples ===
One classical example of a family of stable curves is given by the Weierstrass family of curves

$$\begin{matrix}
\operatorname{Proj}\left( \frac{\mathbb{Q}[t][x,y,z]}{y^2z - x(x-z)(x-tz)} \right) \\
\downarrow \\
\operatorname{Spec}(\mathbb{Q}[t])
\end{matrix}$$

where the fibers over every point $\neq 0,1$ are smooth and the degenerate points only have one double-point singularity. This example can be generalized to the case of a one-parameter family of smooth hyperelliptic curves degenerating at finitely many points.

=== Non-examples ===
In the general case of more than one parameter care has to be taken to remove curves which have worse than double-point singularities. For example, consider the family over $\mathbb{A}^2_{s,t}$ constructed from the polynomials

$$y^2 = x(x-s)(x-t)(x-1)(x-2)$$

since along the diagonal $s = t$ there are non-double-point singularities. Another non-example is the family over $\mathbb{A}^1_t$ given by the polynomials

$$x^3 -y^2 + t$$

which are a family of elliptic curves degenerating to a rational curve with a cusp.

== Properties ==
One of the most important properties of stable curves is the fact that they are local complete intersections. This implies that standard Serre duality theory can be used. In particular, it can be shown that for every stable curve $\omega_{C/S}^{\otimes 3}$ is a relatively very ample sheaf; it can be used to embed the curve into $\mathbb{P}^{5g - 6}_S$. Using the standard Hilbert scheme theory we can construct a moduli scheme of curves of genus $g$ embedded in some projective space. The Hilbert polynomial is given by

$$P_g(n) = (6n-1)(g-1)$$

There is a sublocus of stable curves contained in the Hilbert scheme

$$H_g \subset \textbf{Hilb}^{P_g}_{\mathbb{P}^{5g - 6}_\mathbb{Z}}$$

This represents the functor

$$\mathcal{H}_g(S) \cong \left. \left\{
\begin{matrix}
& \text{stable curves } \pi: C \to S \\
& \text{ with an iso } \\
& \mathbb{P}(\pi_*(\omega_{C/S}^{\otimes 3})) \cong \mathbb{P}^{5g-6}\times S
\end{matrix}
\right\}\Bigg/ {\sim} \right. \cong \operatorname{Hom}(S,H_g)$$

where $\sim$ are isomorphisms of stable curves. In order to make this the moduli space of curves without regard to the embedding (which is encoded by the isomorphism of projective spaces) we have to mod out by $PGL(5g - 6)$. This gives us the moduli stack

$$\mathcal{M}_g := [\underline{H}_g / \underline{PGL}(5g-6)]$$

== See also ==
- Moduli of algebraic curves
- Stable map of curves
