= Barbara Fantechi =

Italian mathematician

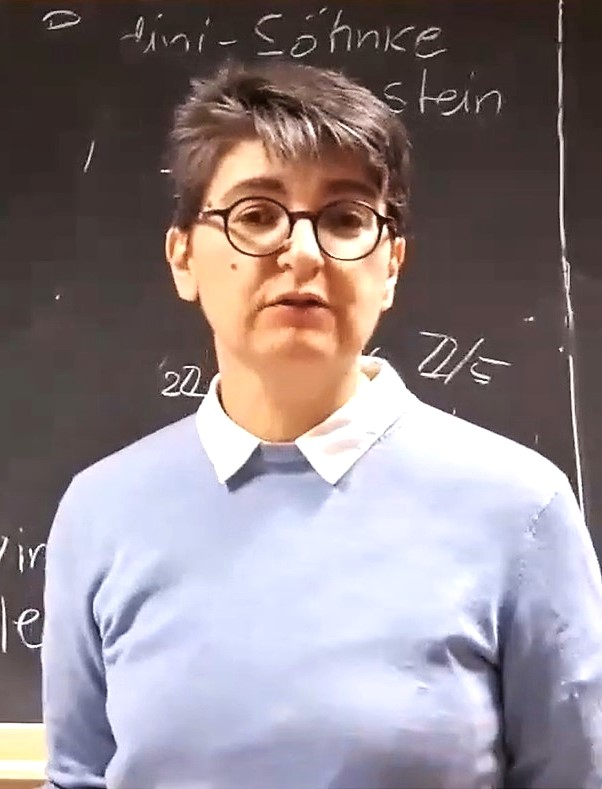
- Fantechi lectures in 2021
- Born: 1966 (age 59–60)
- Education: University of Pisa
- Awards: Prof. Luigi Tartufari award
- Scientific career
- Fields: Algebraic Geometry
- Workplaces: SISSA, Italy
- Thesis: Secanti di varietà proiettive e applicazioni (1988)
- Doctoral advisor: Fabrizio Catanese

Barbara Fantechi is an Italian mathematician and Professor at the International School for Advanced Studies. Her research area is algebraic geometry. She is a member of the Accademia dei Lincei.

== Early life and education ==
Fantechi received her Laurea from the University of Pisa in 1988, with thesis Secanti di varietà proiettive e applicazioni. Her doctoral advisor was Fabrizio Catanese.

== Research and career ==
Her research considers algebraic geometry. She has developed the mathematical theories that underpin algebraic stacks. Stacks were first introduced to understand the moduli space of curves.

== Honours and awards ==
In 2018, Fantechi received the Prof. Luigi Tartufari award from the Accademia dei Lincei. She was awarded the MSRI Chancellor's Professorship for 2017-2018, and spent a year at the University of California, Berkeley. In 2022, Fantechi was the first woman mathematician to become a member of the Accademia dei Lincei.

== Publications ==
- Behrend, Kai; Fantechi, Barbara (1997). "The intrinsic normal cone". Inventiones Mathematicae. 128 (1): 45–88. arXiv:alg-geom/9601010. doi:10.1007/s002220050136. Zbl 0909.14006. Wikidata Q60307086.
- Fantechi, Barbara; Göttsche, Lothar (April 2003). "Orbifold cohomology for global quotients". Duke Mathematical Journal. 117 (2): 197–227. arXiv:math/0104207. doi:10.1215/S0012-7094-03-11721-4. ISSN 0012-7094. S2CID 8407691.
- Fundamental algebraic geometry : Grothendieck's FGA explained. Barbara Fantechi. Providence, R.I.: American Mathematical Society. 2005. ISBN 0-8218-3541-6. OCLC 61362228.
