= Philip Candelas =

British physicist and mathematician

Philip Candelas FRS
- Born: 24 October 1951 (age 74); London, England
- Education: University of Cambridge (BA); University of Oxford (DPhil)
- Scientific career
- Workplaces: University of Oxford; University of Texas at Austin
- Thesis: Quantum Gravitation (1977)
- Doctoral advisor: Dennis Sciama
- Website: www.maths.ox.ac.uk/people/profiles/philip.candelas

Philip Candelas, FRS (born 24 October 1951 in London, UK) is a British physicist and mathematician. After 20 years at the University of Texas at Austin, he served as Rouse Ball Professor of Mathematics at the University of Oxford until 2020 and is a fellow of Wadham College, Oxford.

== Education ==
Candelas was educated at Christ's College, Cambridge and Wadham College, Oxford, where he was a student of Dennis Sciama, from 1972, receiving his bachelor's degree in 1973. From 1975 he was a research fellow at Balliol College, Oxford, and in 1976-77 was at the University of Texas at Austin with John Archibald Wheeler. In 1977 he received his DPhil from Oxford for research on quantum gravity supervised by Dennis Sciama, Derek J. Raine and M. R. Brown.

== Career and research ==
After his DPhil, Candelas continued at the University of Texas, where he became an assistant professor in 1977, associate professor in 1983, and full professor in 1989.

He was at the Institute for Advanced Study from 1993 to 1994, a visiting scientist at CERN from 1991 to 1993 and a visiting professor at Princeton University in 1995. He was the Rouse Ball Professor of Mathematics at Oxford from 1999 to 2020 and also the Head of the Mathematical Physics Group at Oxford.

Candelas is most known for his 1985 work with Edward Witten, Andrew Strominger, and Gary Horowitz in which they introduced compactification to string theory using Calabi–Yau manifolds.

Candelas is also notable for his contributions in the field of quantum field theory (QFT) especially the renormalisation of QFT near black holes. He also contributed to the understanding of the behaviour of quantum fields near boundaries, with applications to the Casimir effect and quark confinement.

=== Awards and honours ===
Candelas was elected a Fellow of the Royal Society (FRS) in 2010.

== Personal life ==
Candelas has both British and United States citizenship. He is married to mathematics professor Xenia de la Ossa and has two daughters.
