= Dwork family =

Family of hypersurfaces in algebraic geometry

In algebraic geometry, a Dwork family is a one-parameter family of hypersurfaces depending on an integer n, studied by Bernard Dwork. Originally considered by Dwork in the context of local zeta-functions, such families have been shown to have relationships with mirror symmetry and extensions of the modularity theorem.

== Definition ==
The Dwork family is given by the equations

$$x_1^n + x_2^n +\cdots +x_n^n = -n\lambda x_1x_2\cdots x_n \, ,$$

for all $n\ge 1$.

== History ==
The Dwork family was originally used by B. Dwork to develop the deformation theory of zeta functions of nonsingular hypersurfaces in projective space.
