= Kuranishi structure =

In mathematics, especially in topology, a Kuranishi structure is a smooth analogue of scheme structure. If a topological space is endowed with a Kuranishi structure, then locally it can be identified with the zero set of a smooth map $(f_1, \ldots, f_k)\colon \R^{n+k} \to \R^k$, or the quotient of such a zero set by a finite group. Kuranishi structures were introduced by Japanese mathematicians Kenji Fukaya and Kaoru Ono in the study of Gromov–Witten invariants and Floer homology in symplectic geometry, and were named after Masatake Kuranishi.

== Definition ==
Let $X$ be a compact metrizable topological space. Let $p \in X$ be a point. A Kuranishi neighborhood of $p$ (of dimension $k$) is a 5-tuple

$$K_p = (U_p, E_p, S_p, F_p, \psi_p)$$

where

- $U_p$ is a smooth orbifold;
- $E_p \to U_p$ is a smooth orbifold vector bundle;
- $S_p\colon U_p \to E_p$ is a smooth section;
- $F_p$ is an open neighborhood of $p$;
- $\psi_p\colon S_p^{-1}(0) \to F_p$ is a homeomorphism.

They should satisfy that $\dim U_p - \operatorname{rank} E_p = k$.

If $p, q \in X$ and $K_p = (U_p, E_p, S_p, F_p, \psi_p)$, $K_q = (U_q, E_q, S_q, F_q, \psi_q)$ are their Kuranishi neighborhoods respectively, then a coordinate change from $K_q$ to $K_p$ is a triple

$$T_{pq} = (U_{pq}, \phi_{pq}, \hat\phi_{pq}),$$

where

- $U_{pq} \subset U_q$ is an open sub-orbifold;
- $\phi_{pq}\colon U_{pq} \to U_p$ is an orbifold embedding;
- $\hat\phi_{pq}\colon E_q|_{U_{pq}} \to E_p$ is an orbifold vector bundle embedding which covers $\phi_{pq}$.

In addition, these data must satisfy the following compatibility conditions:

- $S_p \circ \phi_{pq} = \hat\phi_{pq} \circ S_q|_{U_{pq}}$;
- $\psi_p \circ \phi_{pq}|_{S_q^{-1}(0) \cap U_{pq}} = \psi_q|_{S_q^{-1}(0)\cap U_{pq}}$.

A Kuranishi structure on $X$ of dimension $k$ is a collection

$$\Big( \{ K_p = (U_p, E_p, S_p, F_p, \psi_p) \ |\ p \in X \},\ \{ T_{pq} = (U_{pq}, \phi_{pq}, \hat\phi_{pq} ) \ |\ p \in X,\ q \in F_p\} \Big),$$

where

- $K_p$ is a Kuranishi neighborhood of $p$ of dimension $k$;
- $T_{pq}$ is a coordinate change from $K_q$ to $K_p$.

In addition, the coordinate changes must satisfy the cocycle condition, namely, whenever $q\in F_p,\ r \in F_q$, we require

$$\phi_{pq} \circ \phi_{qr} = \phi_{pr},\ \hat\phi_{pq} \circ \hat\phi_{qr} = \hat\phi_{pr}$$

over the regions where both sides are defined.

== History ==
In Gromov–Witten theory, one needs to define integration over the moduli space of pseudoholomorphic curves $\overline{\mathcal M}_{g, n} (X, A)$. This moduli space is roughly the collection of maps $u$ from a nodal Riemann surface with genus $g$ and $n$ marked points into a symplectic manifold $X$, such that each component satisfies the Cauchy–Riemann equation

$$\overline\partial_J u  = 0$$.

If the moduli space is a smooth, compact, oriented manifold or orbifold, then the integration (or a fundamental class) can be defined. When the symplectic manifold $X$ is semi-positive, this is indeed the case (except for codimension 2 boundaries of the moduli space) if the almost complex structure $J$ is perturbed generically. However, when $X$ is not semi-positive (for example, a smooth projective variety with negative first Chern class), the moduli space may contain configurations for which one component is a multiple cover of a holomorphic sphere $u\colon S^2 \to X$ whose intersection with the first Chern class of $X$ is negative. Such configurations make the moduli space very singular so a fundamental class cannot be defined in the usual way.

The notion of Kuranishi structure is a way of defining a virtual fundamental cycle, which plays the same role as a fundamental cycle when the moduli space is cut out transversely. It was first used by Fukaya and Ono in defining the Gromov–Witten invariants and Floer homology, and was further developed when Fukaya, Yong-Geun Oh, Hiroshi Ohta, and Ono studied Lagrangian intersection Floer theory.
