= Xenia de la Ossa =

Costa Rican theoretical physicist

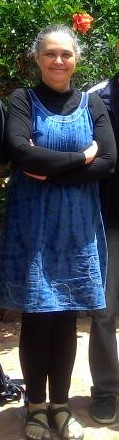
Picture taken in the garden at the location of Geometric, Algebraic and Topological Methods for Quantum Field Theory Villa de Leyva Summer School – 2017

Xenia de la Ossa Osegueda (born 30 June 1958, San José, Costa Rica) is a Costa Rican-British theoretical physicist whose research focuses on mathematical structures that arise in string theory. She is a professor at Oxford's Mathematical Institute.

== Academic career ==
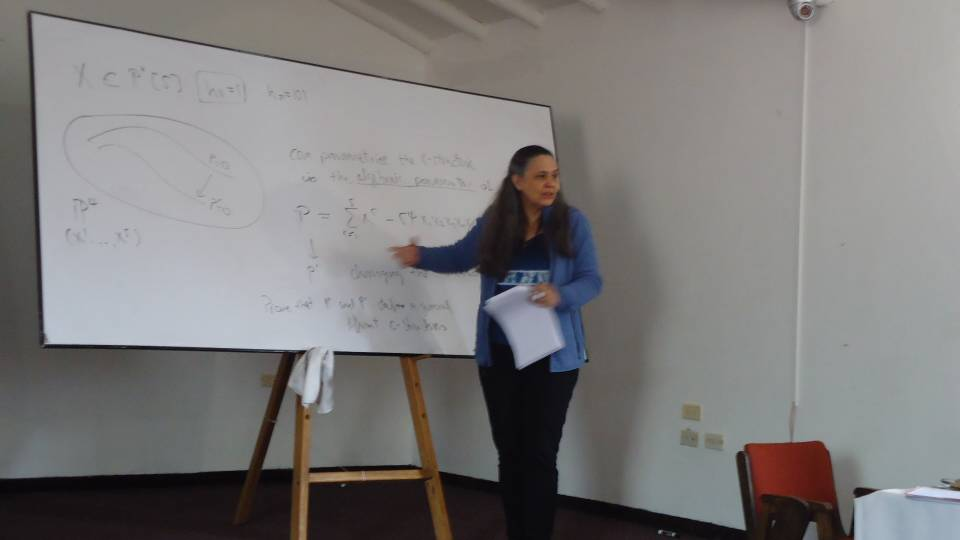
Picture taken during a lecture of professor Xenia de la Ossa at the Geometric, Algebraic and Topological Methods for Quantum Field Theory Villa de Leyva Summer School – 2017.

Xenia de la Ossa received her PhD from University of Texas at Austin with the dissertation Quantum Calabi-Yau Manifolds and Mirror Symmetry written under the supervision of Willy Fischler.

She was at the Institute for Advanced Study from 1993 to 1995.

Xenia de la Ossa is known for her contributions to mathematical physics with much of her work focusing on string theory and its interplay with algebraic geometry. In 1991, she coauthored "A pair of Calabi-Yau manifolds as an exactly soluble superconformal theory", which contained remarkable predictions about the number of rational curves on a quintic threefold. This was the first work to use mirror symmetry in order to make enumerative predictions in algebraic geometry, which moreover went far beyond what could be proved at the time using the available techniques within the area.

This paper was cited in books about string theory. In 2004, Roger Penrose mentioned it in his book The Road to Reality:

I have to admit to there being the appearance of something of genuine significance ‘going on behind the scenes’ in some aspects of string/ M-theory. As the mathematician, Richard Thomas, of Imperial College London remarked to me, in an e-mail message: ‘’ I can’t emphasize enough how deep some of these dualities are: they constantly surprise us with new predictions. They show up structure never thought possible. Mathematicians confidently predicted several times that these things weren’t possible, but people like Candelas, de la Ossa, et al. have shown this to be wrong. Every prediction made, suitably interpreted mathematically, has turned out to be correct. And not for any conceptual maths reason so far – we have no idea why they’re true, we just compute both sides independently and indeed find the same structures, symmetries and answers on both sides. To a mathematician these things cannot be coincidence, they must come from a higher reason. And that reason is the assumption that this big mathematical theory describes nature…’’.

The breakthrough enumerative predictions of the de la Ossa et al paper were eventually confirmed for low degrees of the curves (up to 9) and required corrections in higher degree.

Professor de la Ossa has belonged to scientific committees of several organizations for the promotion of scientific events in Latin America, among them the Mesoamerican Centre for Theoretical Physics and the School of Mathematics of Latin America and the Caribbean. She has been elected to the Costa Rican National Academy of Science. She has been invited as speaker to many conferences at academic institutions around the world.

In 2019, she was awarded the Dean’s Distinguished Visiting Professorship by the Fields Institute in Toronto and the Mathematics Department of Toronto University.

She has also been principal investigator for the project entitled Vacuum States of the Heterotic String, supported by a grant from the Engineering and Physical Sciences Research Council (EPSRC).

== Personal life ==
Xenia de la Ossa is married to British physicist and mathematician Philip Candelas and has two daughters.
