= Gysin homomorphism =

Long exact sequence

In the field of mathematics known as algebraic topology, the Gysin sequence is a long exact sequence which relates the cohomology classes of the base space, the fiber and the total space of a sphere bundle. The Gysin sequence is a useful tool for calculating the cohomology rings given the Euler class of the sphere bundle and vice versa. It was introduced by Gysin (1942), and is generalized by the Serre spectral sequence.

== Definition ==
Consider a fiber-oriented sphere bundle with total space E, base space M, fiber S^{k} and projection map $\pi$: $S^k \hookrightarrow E \stackrel{\pi}{\longrightarrow} M.$

Any such bundle defines a degree k + 1 cohomology class e called the Euler class of the bundle.

=== De Rham cohomology ===
Discussion of the sequence is clearest with de Rham cohomology. There cohomology classes are represented by differential forms, so that e can be represented by a (k + 1)-form.

The projection map $\pi$ induces a map in cohomology $H^\ast$ called its pullback $\pi^\ast$

$$\pi^*:H^*(M)\longrightarrow H^*(E). \,$$

In the case of a fiber bundle, one can also define a pushforward map $\pi_\ast$

$$\pi_*:H^*(E)\longrightarrow H^{*-k}(M)$$

which acts by fiberwise integration of differential forms on the oriented sphere – note that this map goes "the wrong way": it is a covariant map between objects associated with a contravariant functor.

Gysin proved that the following is a long exact sequence

$$\cdots \longrightarrow H^n(E) \stackrel{\pi_*}{\longrightarrow} H^{n-k}(M) \stackrel{e_\wedge}{\longrightarrow} H^{n+1}(M) \stackrel{\pi^*}{\longrightarrow} H^{n+1}(E) \longrightarrow \cdots$$

where $e_\wedge$ is the wedge product of a differential form with the Euler class e.

=== Integral cohomology ===
The Gysin sequence is a long exact sequence not only for the de Rham cohomology of differential forms, but also for cohomology with integral coefficients. In the integral case one needs to replace the wedge product with the Euler class with the cup product, and the pushforward map no longer corresponds to integration.

== Gysin homomorphism in algebraic geometry ==
Let i: X → Y be a (closed) regular embedding of codimension d, Y' → Y a morphism and i': X' = X ×_{Y} Y' → Y' the induced map. Let N be the pullback of the normal bundle of i to X'. Then the refined Gysin homomorphism i^{!} refers to the composition

$$i^!: A_k(Y') \overset{\sigma}\longrightarrow A_k(N) \overset{\text{Gysin}} \longrightarrow A_{k-d}(X')$$

where

- σ is the specialization homomorphism; which sends a k-dimensional subvariety V to the normal cone to the intersection of V and X' in V. The result lies in N through $C_{X'/Y'} \hookrightarrow N$.
- The second map is the (usual) Gysin homomorphism induced by the zero-section embedding $X' \hookrightarrow N$.

The homomorphism i^{!} encodes intersection product in intersection theory in that one either shows the intersection product of X and V to be given by the formula $X \cdot V = i^![V],$ or takes this formula as a definition.

Example: Given a vector bundle E, let s: X → E be a section of E. Then, when s is a regular section, $s^{!}[X]$ is the class of the zero-locus of s, where [X] is the fundamental class of X.

== See also ==
- Logarithmic form
- Wang sequence

== Sources ==
- Bott, Raoul; Tu, Loring (1982), Differential Forms in Algebraic Topology, Graduate Texts in Mathematics, Springer-Verlag, ISBN 978-038790613-3
- Fulton, William (1998), Intersection theory, Ergebnisse der Mathematik und ihrer Grenzgebiete. 3. Folge., vol. 2 (2nd ed.), Berlin, New York: Springer-Verlag, doi:10.1007/978-1-4612-1700-8, ISBN 978-3-540-62046-4, MR 1644323
- Gysin, Werner (1942), "Zur Homologietheorie der Abbildungen und Faserungen von Mannigfaltigkeiten", Commentarii Mathematici Helvetici, 14: 61–122, doi:10.1007/bf02565612, ISSN 0010-2571, MR 0006511
