= Gromov–Witten invariant =

Concept in string theory

In mathematics, specifically in symplectic geometry and algebraic geometry, Gromov–Witten (GW) invariants are rational numbers that, in certain situations, count the number of curves (pseudoholomorphic or algebraic) meeting prescribed conditions in a given ambient space (a symplectic manifold or a smooth projective variety).

The GW invariants may be packaged as a homology or cohomology class in an appropriate space, or as the deformed cup product of quantum cohomology. These invariants have been used to distinguish symplectic manifolds that were previously indistinguishable. They also play a crucial role in closed type IIA string theory. They are named after Mikhail Gromov and Edward Witten.

The rigorous mathematical definition of Gromov–Witten invariants is lengthy and difficult, so it is treated separately in the stable map article. This article attempts a more intuitive explanation of what the invariants mean, how they are computed, and why they are important.

== Informal description ==
Informally, for a fixed ambient space $X$, the Gromov–Witten invariants count how many curves there are that pass through $n$ chosen submanifolds (or subvarieties) of $X$. This is done using the technical machinery of cohomology and intersection theory in the moduli spaces of stable maps, which can be thought of as spaces parametrizing curves in $X$.

However, as these moduli spaces can have singularities, the resulting number is not always a natural number; it is sometimes described as a "virtual" count for this reason. This is because the singular points can contribute fractional values to the count.

A classic example of a GW invariant is the number $N_d$ of degree-$d$ rational plane curves passing through $n=3d-1$ general points in the projective plane. (Note that $3d-1$ is in fact the dimension of the space of degree-$d$ rational plane curves, so we expect to get a finite number as the answer.) Starting from the base case $N_1 = 1$ – there is exactly one line through any two points – the rest of these numbers can be calculated using a recursive formula, obtained through intersection theory in the moduli space of stable maps $\overline{M}_{0,3d}(X, d)$.

We get $N_1 = 1, N_2 = 1, N_3 = 12, N_4 = 620, N_5 = 87304, \ldots$.

== Definition ==
Consider the following:

- $X$: a closed symplectic manifold of dimension $2k$,
- $A$ : a 2-dimensional homology class in $X$,
- $g$ : a non-negative integer,
- $n$ : a non-negative integer.

Now we define the Gromov–Witten invariants associated to the 4-tuple: $(X,A,g,n)$. Let $\overline{\mathcal{M}}_{g, n}$ be the Deligne–Mumford moduli space of curves of genus $g$ with $n$ marked points and $\overline{\mathcal{M}}_{g, n}(X, A)$ denote the moduli space of stable maps into $X$ of class $A$, for some chosen almost complex structure $J$ on $X$ compatible with its symplectic form. The elements of $\overline{\mathcal{M}}_{g, n}(X, A)$ are of the form:

$$(C, x_1, \ldots, x_n, f)$$,

where $C$ is a (not necessarily stable) curve with $n$ marked points $x_1,\dots ,x_n$ and $f:C\to X$ is pseudoholomorphic. The moduli space has real dimension

$$d := 2 c_1^X (A) + (2k - 6) (1 - g) + 2 n.$$

Let

$$\mathrm{st}(C, x_1, \ldots, x_n) \in \overline{\mathcal{M}}_{g, n}$$

denote the stabilization of the curve. Let

$$Y := \overline{\mathcal{M}}_{g, n} \times X^n,$$

which has real dimension $6g- 6 + 2(k + 1)n$. There is an evaluation map

$$\begin{cases}
\mathrm{ev}: \overline{\mathcal{M}}_{g, n}(X, A) \to Y \\
\mathrm{ev}(C, x_1, \ldots, x_n, f) = \left(\operatorname{st}(C, x_1, \ldots, x_n), f(x_1), \ldots, f(x_n) \right).
\end{cases}$$

The evaluation map sends the fundamental class of $\overline{\mathcal{M}}_{g, n}(X, A)$ to a $d$-dimensional rational homology class in $Y$, denoted

$$GW_{g, n}^{X, A} \in H_d(Y, \Q).$$

In a sense, this homology class is the Gromov–Witten invariant of $X$ for the data $g$, $n$, and $A$. It is an invariant of the symplectic isotopy class of the symplectic manifold $X$.

To interpret the Gromov–Witten invariant geometrically, let $\beta$ be a homology class in $\overline{\mathcal{M}}_{g, n}$ and $\alpha_1, \ldots, \alpha_n$ homology classes in $X$, such that the sum of the codimensions of $\beta, \alpha_1, \ldots, \alpha_n$ equals $d$. These induce homology classes in $Y$ by the Künneth formula. Let

$$GW_{g, n}^{X, A}(\beta, \alpha_1, \ldots, \alpha_n) := GW_{g, n}^{X, A} \cdot \beta \cdot \alpha_1 \cdots \alpha_n \in H_0(Y, \Q),$$

where $\cdot$ denotes the intersection product in the rational homology of $Y$. This is a rational number, the Gromov–Witten invariant for the given classes. This number gives a "virtual" count of the number of pseudoholomorphic curves (in the class $A$, of genus $g$, with domain in the $\beta$-part of the Deligne–Mumford space) whose $n$ marked points are mapped to cycles representing the $\alpha_i$.

There are numerous variations on this construction, in which cohomology is used instead of homology, integration replaces intersection, Chern classes pulled back from the Deligne–Mumford space are also integrated, etc.

== Computational techniques ==
Gromov–Witten invariants are generally difficult to compute. While they are defined for any generic almost complex structure J, for which the linearization D of the $\bar \partial_{j, J}$operator is surjective, they must actually be computed with respect to a specific, chosen J. It is most convenient to choose J with special properties, such as nongeneric symmetries or integrability. Indeed, computations are often carried out on Kähler manifolds using the techniques of algebraic geometry.

However, a special J may induce a nonsurjective D and thus a moduli space of pseudoholomorphic curves that is larger than expected. Loosely speaking, one corrects for this effect by forming from the cokernel of D a vector bundle, called the obstruction bundle, and then realizing the GW invariant as the integral of the Euler class of the obstruction bundle. Making this idea precise requires significant technical arguments using Kuranishi structures.

The main computational technique is localization. This applies when X is toric, meaning that it is acted upon by a complex torus, or at least locally toric. Then one can use the Atiyah–Bott fixed-point theorem, of Michael Atiyah and Raoul Bott, to reduce, or localize, the computation of a GW invariant to an integration over the fixed-point locus of the action.

Another approach is to employ symplectic surgeries to relate X to one or more other spaces whose GW invariants are more easily computed. Of course, one must first understand how the invariants behave under the surgeries. For such applications one often uses the more elaborate relative GW invariants, which count curves with prescribed tangency conditions along a symplectic submanifold of X of real codimension two.

== Related invariants and other constructions ==
The GW invariants are closely related to a number of other concepts in geometry, including the Donaldson invariants and Seiberg–Witten invariants in the symplectic category, and Donaldson–Thomas theory in the algebraic category. For compact symplectic four-manifolds, Clifford Taubes showed that a variant of the GW invariants (see Taubes's Gromov invariant) is equivalent to the Seiberg–Witten invariants. For algebraic threefolds, they are conjectured to contain the same information as integer valued Donaldson–Thomas invariants. Physical considerations also give rise to Gopakumar–Vafa invariants, which are meant to give an underlying integer count to the typically rational Gromov-Witten theory. The Gopakumar-Vafa invariants do not presently have a rigorous mathematical definition, and this is one of the major problems in the subject.

The Gromov-Witten invariants of smooth projective varieties can be defined entirely within algebraic geometry. The classical enumerative geometry of plane curves and of rational curves in homogeneous spaces are both captured by GW invariants. However, the major advantage that GW invariants have over the classical enumerative counts is that they are invariant under deformations of the complex structure of the target. The GW invariants also furnish deformations of the product structure in the cohomology ring of a symplectic or projective manifold; they can be organized to construct the quantum cohomology ring of the manifold X, which is a deformation of the ordinary cohomology. The associativity of the deformed product is essentially a consequence of the self-similar nature of the moduli space of stable maps that are used to define the invariants.

The quantum cohomology ring is known to be isomorphic to the symplectic Floer homology with its pair-of-pants product.

== Application in physics ==
GW invariants are of interest in string theory, a branch of physics that attempts to unify general relativity and quantum mechanics. In this theory, everything in the universe, beginning with the elementary particles, is made of tiny strings. As a string travels through spacetime it traces out a surface, called the worldsheet of the string. Unfortunately, the moduli space of such parametrized surfaces, at least a priori, is infinite-dimensional; no appropriate measure on this space is known, and thus the path integrals of the theory lack a rigorous definition.

The situation improves in the variation known as closed A-model. Here there are six spacetime dimensions, which constitute a symplectic manifold, and it turns out that the worldsheets are necessarily parametrized by pseudoholomorphic curves, whose moduli spaces are only finite-dimensional. GW invariants, as integrals over these moduli spaces, are then path integrals of the theory. In particular, the free energy of the A-model at genus g is the generating function of the genus g GW invariants.

== See also ==
- Cotangent complex – for deformation theory
- Schubert calculus
