= Witten (surname) =

Witten is a surname. Notable people with the surname include:

- Benjamin Witten, American chemist
- Daniela Witten, biostatistician and daughter of Edward Witten
- Dominique Witten, American comedian and actress
- Edward Witten, theoretical physicist and father of Ilana and Daniela Witten
- Ian Witten, English computer scientist
- Ilana B. Witten, neuroscientist
- Jack W. Witten (1880–1959), American politician from Virginia
- Jason Witten, former American football player
- Jeremy Witten, American baseball player
- Jesse Witten, American tennis player
- Johann Daniel Witten, German pioneer
- Karen Witten, New Zealand public health academic
- Laurence Claiborne Witten II, American antiquarian and rare book collector
- Lindsey Witten, American football player
- Louis Witten, American theoretical physicist and father of both Edward and Matt Witten
- Matt Witten, screenwriter
- Rich Witten, American baseball coach and catcher
- Robert Pincus-Witten, American art critic
- Samuel M. Witten, American lawyer
- Susan Tyler Witten (born 1970), American politician
- Thomas Witten, American theoretical physicist

== See also ==
- Whitten (surname)
- Witt (surname)
- Witte (surname)
