= Witten (disambiguation) =

- Witten is a city in North Rhine-Westphalia, Germany
  - Witten Hauptbahnhof a railway station in Witten
  - Witten/Herdecke University a University in Witten

Witten may also refer to:

== Places ==
- Witten, Netherlands
- Witten, South Dakota, United States
- Witten Fork, a stream in Monroe County, Ohio, United States
- Witten Towhead, an island on the Ohio River in West Virginia.
- 11349 Witten, a minor planet

== People ==
- Witten (surname)
- Witten T. Philippo, Marshallese judge and politician
- Witten William Harris (1872 – 1958), American newspaper publisher and politician

== Other ==
- Witten-Oorlog a Dutch pamphlet published in the 1750s

== See also ==
- Witten invariant (disambiguation)
