= Introduction to M-theory =

Candidate "Theory of Everything"

In non-technical terms, M-theory presents an idea about the basic substance of the universe. Although a complete mathematical formulation of M-theory is not known, the general approach is the leading contender for a universal "theory of everything" that unifies gravity with other forces such as electromagnetism. M-theory aims to unify quantum mechanics with general relativity's gravitational force in a mathematically consistent way. In comparison, other theories such as loop quantum gravity are considered by physicists and researchers to be less elegant, because they posit gravity to be completely different from forces such as the electromagnetic force.

== Background ==
In the early years of the 20th century, the atom – long believed to be the smallest building-block of matter – was proven to consist of even smaller components called protons, neutrons and electrons, which are known as subatomic particles. Other subatomic particles began being discovered in the 1960s. In the 1970s, it was discovered that protons and neutrons (and other hadrons) are themselves made up of smaller particles called quarks. The Standard Model is the set of rules that describes the interactions of these particles.

In the 1980s, a new mathematical model of theoretical physics, called string theory, emerged. It showed how all the different subatomic particles known to science could be constructed by hypothetical one-dimensional "strings", infinitesimal building-blocks that have only the dimension of length, but not height or width. These strings vibrate in multiple dimensions and, depending on how they vibrate, they might be seen in three-dimensional space as matter, light or gravity. In string theory, every form of matter is said to be the result of the vibration of strings.

However, for string theory to be mathematically consistent, the strings must live in a universe with ten dimensions. String theory explains our perception of the universe to have four dimensions (three space dimensions and one time dimension) by imagining that the extra six dimensions are "curled up", to be so small that they can't be observed day-to-day. The technical term for this is compactification. These dimensions are usually made to take the shape of mathematical objects called Calabi–Yau manifolds.

Five major string theories were developed and found to be mathematically consistent with the principle of all matter being made of strings. Having five different versions of string theory was seen as a puzzle.

Speaking at the Strings '95 conference at the University of Southern California, Edward Witten of the Institute for Advanced Study suggested that the five different versions of string theory might be describing the same thing seen from different perspectives. He proposed a unifying theory called "M-theory", which brought all of the string theories together. It did this by asserting that strings are an approximation of curled-up two-dimensional membranes vibrating in an 11-dimensional spacetime. According to Witten, the M could stand for "magic", "mystery", or "membrane" according to taste, and the true meaning of the title should be decided when a better understanding of the theory is discovered.

== Status ==
M-theory is not complete, and the mathematics of the approach are not yet well understood. M-theory is a theory of quantum gravity; and as all others it has not gained experimental evidence that would confirm its validity. It also does not single out our observable universe as being special, and so does not aim to predict from first principles everything we can measure about it.

Nevertheless, some physicists are drawn to M-theory because of its degree of uniqueness and rich set of mathematical properties, triggering the hope that it may describe our world within a single framework.

One feature of M-theory that has drawn great interest is that it naturally predicts the existence of the graviton, a spin-2 particle hypothesized to mediate the gravitational force. Furthermore, M-theory naturally predicts a phenomenon that resembles black hole evaporation. Competing unification theories such as asymptotically safe gravity, E8 theory, noncommutative geometry, and causal fermion systems have not demonstrated any level of mathematical consistency.

== See also ==
- History of string theory
