= Whitten (surname) =

Whitten is an English surname and is associated with origins in Ireland and Scotland. Notable people with the name include:

- Barbara Whitten, American physicist
- Benoni Whitten (died 1883), American attorney and judge from Oregon
- Bill Frank Whitten (1944–2006), Hollywood fashion designer
- Bill Whitten, American songwriter and musician
- Cameron Whitten (born 1991), American activist and mayoral candidate
- Charles A. Whitten (died 1994), American geodecist
- Chris Whitten (born 1959), British session drummer
- C. W. Whitten (1871–1957), American educator and athletic administrator
- Danny Whitten (1943–1972), American musician and songwriter
- Deb Whitten (born 1966), Canadian field hockey player
- Don Whitten (1935–2021), Australian rules footballer
- Frank Whitten (1942–2011), New Zealand television actor
- George Whitten (1922–2001), Australian politician
- Greg Whitten, American software architect
- Herbert Whitten (1909–1981), Northern Irish politician
- Ian Whitten (born 1987), Irish rugby union player
- Jack Whitten (1939–2018), American abstract painter
- Jack Whitten (footballer) (1922–1980), Australian rules footballer
- Jamie L. Whitten (1910–1995), American politician from Mississippi
- Jeffrey L. Whitten (born c. 1955), American computer scientist and professor
- John Whitten, (1920–2000), American Central Intelligence Agency officer
- Len Whitten, Canadian Anglican Bishop
- Les Whitten (1928–2017), American investigative reporter and novelist
- Marguerite Whitten (1913—1990), American film actress
- Martha E. Whitten (1842–1917), American author
- Michelle Whitten, American non-profit executive director
- Norman Whitten (1881–1969), British actor and film producer
- Tara Whitten (born 1980), Canadian track racing cyclist
- Ted Whitten (1933–1995), Australian rules footballer
- Ted Whitten, Jr. (born 1957), Australian rules footballer
- Tim Whitten, Australian record producer, audio engineer, and mixer
- Todd Whitten (born 1965), American football coach and player
- Tony Whitten (1953–2017), British conservationist
- Wesley Kingston Whitten (1918–2010), Australian reproductive biologist
- Wilfred Whitten (1864–1942), British writer and editor
