= Whetten =

Whetten is a surname. Notable people with the surname include:

- David A. Whetten (born 1946), American organizational theorist
- Nathan Whetten (1900–1984), American sociologist and academic administrator

== See also ==
- Whitten (surname)
