= Chiara Nappi =

Italian physicist (born 1951)

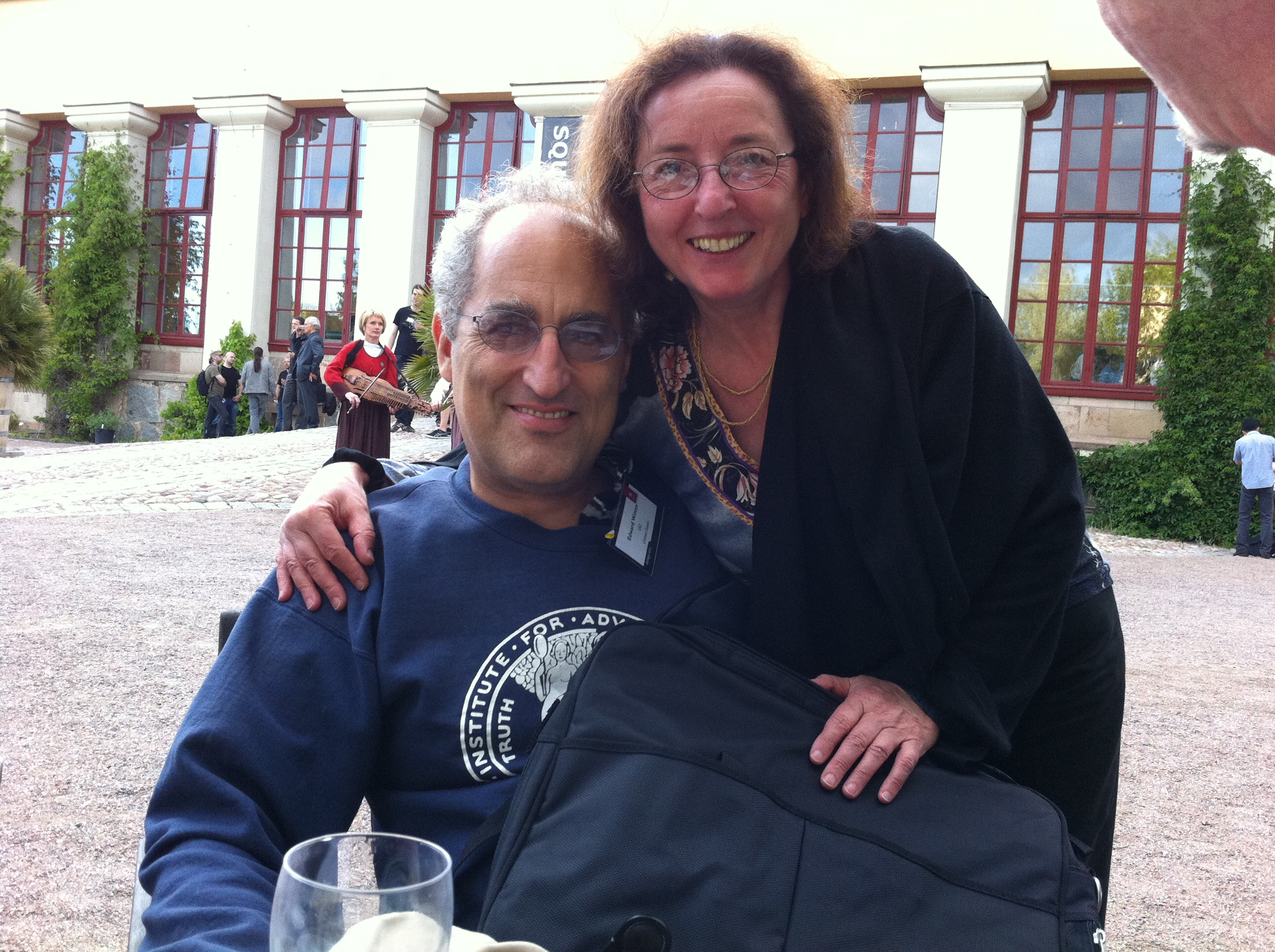
- Nappi (right) with her husband Ed Witten in 2011
- Born: Chiara Rosanna Nappi; 21 February 1951 (age 75); Naples, Italy
- Education: University of Rome
- Spouse: Edward Witten
- Children: 3, including Ilana B. and Daniela Witten
- Relatives: Louis Witten (father-in-law); Matt Witten (brother-in-law)
- Scientific career
- Fields: Physics
- Workplaces: University of Southern California; Princeton University
- Doctoral advisor: Giovanni Jona-Lasinio

Chiara Rosanna Nappi (born 21 February 1951) is an Italian physicist. Her research areas have included mathematical physics, particle physics, and string theory.

== Academic career ==
Nappi obtained the Diploma della Scuola di Perfezionamento in physics from the University of Naples in 1976. Her advisor was Giovanni Jona-Lasinio of the University of Rome. She moved to the United States to carry out academic research, first at Harvard University, and later at Princeton University and the Institute for Advanced Study. She has since been a professor of physics at the University of Southern California (1999–2001) and Princeton University (2001–present). In May 2013, Nappi obtained emerita status in Princeton.

== Research ==
Chiara Nappi's early work focused on rigorous statistical mechanics. Her work with R. Figari and R. Hoegh-Krohn resulted in one of the first proposals of a thermal interpretation of quantum field theory in de Sitter space. In the 1980s, with G. Adkins and E. Witten, she investigated the static properties of baryons in the Skyrme model, and with A. Abouelsaood, C. G. Callan, and S. A. Yost, she worked on the behavior of open strings in background electromagnetic fields. She has also contributed to the analysis of black hole solutions and noncommutativity in string theory and integrability in string theories and gauge theories. Nappi has also written a number of articles on education and women in science.

== Personal life ==
Nappi is married to Edward Witten, a mathematical physicist and professor at the Institute for Advanced Study in Princeton, New Jersey. They have three children, Ilana, Daniela, and Rafael.
