= John J. Sie =

Chinese-American businessman and philanthropist

- Education: Manhattan College; Polytechnic Institute of Brooklyn
- Known for: Founder of Starz
- Spouse: Anna Maglione Sie
- Children: Michelle Whitten

John J. Sie is a Chinese-American businessman and philanthropist. He is the founder and chairman of Starz Entertainment Group LLC.

John J. Sie
- Traditional Chinese: 謝誠剛
- Simplified Chinese: 谢诚刚
Transcriptions
Standard Mandarin
- Hanyu Pinyin: Xiè Chénggāng

== Early life ==
Born in Nanjing, China, Sie and his family escaped from Mainland China during the Chinese Civil War to Taiwan. He came to the United States when he was 14 years old. During high school he lived in an orphanage in New York City. As a young man he earned B.E.E. and M.E.E. degrees from Manhattan College and Polytechnic Institute of Brooklyn in 1957 and 1958.

== Career ==
After school Sie began his career in 1958 with RCA Defense Electronics Division on advanced microwave solid state devices. In 1960, he co-founded and later became chairman and chief executive officer of Micro State Electronics Corp. Sie then joined Jerrold Electronics Corp, a subsidiary of General Instrument Co., as general manager and senior vice president of the Cable Television Division. Sie then began work for Showtime Entertainment as senior vice president of sales and marketing.

In 1984, Sie left the East Coast and joined Colorado's Tele-Communications Inc. (now Comcast and Liberty Media), as senior vice president in charge of strategic planning, programming, marketing, technology, and government relations. In 1989 he submitted the first white paper on digital high-definition television to the United States Congress and the Federal Communications Commission.

In 1991, with the support of Tele-Communications Inc, Sie founded and was the chairman and chief executive officer of the Starz Encore Group.

Sie retired in January 2005 as chief executive officer of Starz Entertainment Group.

== Philanthropy and civic involvement ==
Sie and his wife, Anna Maglione Sie, established the Anna and John J. Sie Foundation in 2005 supporting the University of Colorado's Sie Family Down Syndrome Break-Through Research Initiative; the University of Denver's Chair of Italian Language and Culture Anna Maglione-Sie; the Denver School of Science and Technology; the Denver Art Museum.

Sie is a member of the Committee of 100. In honor of his father, Sie established the Sie Cheou-Kang Center for International Security and Diplomacy at the University of Denver’s Josef Korbel School of International Studies. Sie supports the Chinese Executive Media Management Program. He helped establish that visiting scholar program in 2000 at the University of Denver's Daniels College of Business. He belongs to the honor fraternity Sigma Xi and the service fraternity Alpha Phi Omega.

== Awards ==
Sie received numerous awards and honors: 2010 Community Cultural Enrichment Award, Mizel Museum, 2009 Chinese American Hero, Asian Week Magazine, 2009 Man and Woman of the Year, The Villager, 2008 Asian Pacific Americans in Business, Voices from Colorado, 2003 Inductee, Cable Television Hall of Fame, 2002 International Bridge Builder Award, Josef Korbel School of International Studies at the University of Denver, 2001 Chairman’s Award, Cable Television Administration and Marketing Association (CTAM, 2001 Stanley B. Thomas Lifetime Achievement Award, National Association of Minorities in Communications, 2001 Bridge Builder Asian American Leadership Award, The AURA Fund and aMedia, Inc., 2001 Bill Daniels Business Leader of the Year, The Denver Business Journal, 1986 Grand Tam Award CTAM, 1982 Robert H. Beisswenger Memorial Award (Vanguard Associates Award) by the National Cable Television Association, 1960 RCA David Sarnoff Fellowship, 1958 Microwave Research Institute Fellow, Polytechnic Institute of Brooklyn.

== Personal life ==
Sie is married to Anna Maglione Sie, and has several children, including Michelle Whitten.
