= Legends Game (Australian rules football) =

Annual Australian rules football charity match

E. J. Whitten Legends Game
- Victoria
- Sport: Australian rules football
- Type: Charity event
- Teams: Victoria; All-Stars
- First meeting: 1996
- Latest meeting: 2026
- Broadcasters: Nine Network (1996–2015); Seven Network (2016–present)

Statistics
- Most wins: Victoria (14)
- Largest victory: Victoria – 25 points (2026)
- Largest goal scoring: Victoria, All-Stars – 275 points (2019)
- Longest win streak: Victoria – 3 games (2012–2014)
- Current win streak: Victoria – 1 game (2026)

The Legends Game for Prostate Cancer, previously known as the E. J. Whitten Legends Game, and currently known as the Four 'N Twenty Legends Game for Prostate Cancer for sponsorship reasons, is an annual charity all-star game of Australian rules football. Retired star players and selected non-footballing celebrities are united in a State of Origin interstate game between Victoria and a composite side known as the All-Stars. The game was contested annually from 1996 to 2019 and played under Superules before taking a hiatus and returning in 2025.

Originally contested as a competitive exhibition match, the event later transitioned into a form of sports entertainment. To cater to a television audience, later matches featured increased celebrity appearances, comedic scripting, and manipulated outcomes designed to ensure close finishes.

== History ==
E. J. Whitten, a former Footscray player who died of prostate cancer in 1995, was regarded as one of the sport's greatest players and a passionate advocate for State of Origin football. His enthusiasm helped maintain the format's profile for many years, and his emotional farewell at the Victoria vs South Australia game at the MCG in 1995 remains an enduring symbol of Australian rules football. Following his death, the popularity of interstate football waned, with the last traditional game played in 1999. In the wake of his passing, his son, Ted Whitten Jr., established the E. J. Whitten Foundation for prostate cancer research, with the Legends Game serving as a major fundraising vehicle.

The inaugural Legends Game was played at the Whitten Oval, the home of Whitten's former club. Most games have been televised free-to-air in Victoria and South Australia. As the event grew in popularity, it was relocated to larger venues, primarily being held at Docklands Stadium since 2003. In 2007, female participants were included for the first time, featuring Daisy Pearce and Shannon McFerran of the Victorian Women's Football League, making it a prominent mixed-gender exhibition match.

The event raised an average of A$1.2 million in revenue annually for the five years prior to 2016, and generated around $100,000 in profit for the foundation. In 2016, the Seven Network secured the rights to televise the match, which was moved to the football-free weekend between the final round of the premiership season and the first week of the finals series.

In 2018, the match was played at Adelaide Oval, marking the first game played in Adelaide since 1999. In 2019, the match was contested under the AFLX format—a high-scoring variant played on a rectangular field—at AAMI Park in Melbourne.

The match was cancelled between 2020 and 2024 due to the impacts of the COVID-19 pandemic and subsequent organizational challenges. During the hiatus, the E. J. Whitten Foundation later merged with the Australian Prostate Centre in 2021 to form RULE Prostate Cancer, consolidating operations. It returned in 2025 as the Four 'N Twenty Legends Game for Prostate Cancer, reverting to a Superrules format. The 2025 game saw a series-record attendance of 31,320 and garnered media attention after comedian Dave Hughes was hospitalised with broken ribs and a punctured lung following on-field contact.

== Highlights ==
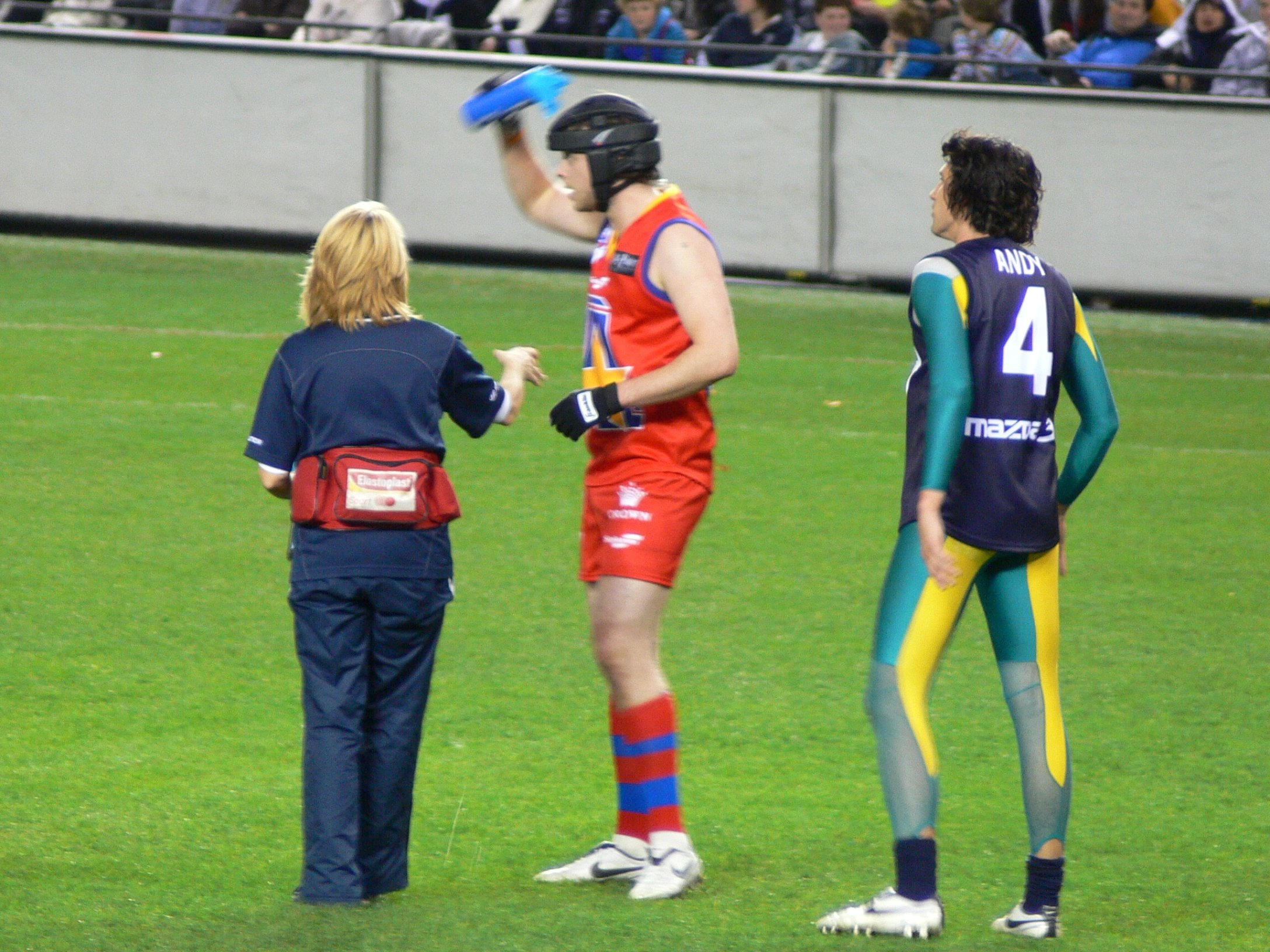
Hamish & Andy at the 2008 E. J. Whitten Legends Game

The game itself is a tongue-in-cheek affair, with matches often involving non-football-related celebrities such as comedy duo Hamish & Andy; comedian Russell Gilbert, known for his comical on-field antics; and fictional character Bryan "Strauchanie" Strauchan, played by Peter Helliar. The game's narrative is frequently manipulated by the players, timekeepers, and field umpires to ensure an exciting conclusion. Because of this, the average winning margin is only 7 points, including 5 draws, and official betting on the event is disallowed.

The series has featured many memorable highlights over the years, including Strauchanie's various antics, usually involving staging for a free kick; a 75-metre barrel from Jimmy Bartel that resulted in a 10-point super goal; Jonathan Brown kicking a difficult pocket goal after the siren due to the umpire "not hearing the siren" (possibly a reference to sirengate); Anthony Rocca kicking a massive torpedo goal from inside the centre square; Russell Gilbert changing his guernsey to the opposite team's late in the game to score a goal for the opposition (which became a running gag); Derek Kickett kicking the ball over his head from the right forward pocket for an unlikely goal; and Craig Hutchison's self-proclaimed "greatest goal in AFL history" in 2011, which involved selling candy to a mooning Ryan Fitzgerald before kicking a banana goal from nearly 40 metres out.

== Match results ==
Year	Venue	Scores				Attendance
Year	Venue	Victoria	All-Stars	Winner	Margin (points)	Attendance
1996	Whitten Oval, Footscray	10.13 (73)	13.9 (87)	All-Stars	14	
1997	Whitten Oval, Footscray	10.11 (71)	7.10 (52)	Victoria	19	
1998	Whitten Oval, Footscray	8.6 (54)	7.10 (52)	Victoria	2	
1999	Adelaide Oval, Adelaide	7.12 (54)	8.8 (56)	All-Stars	2	
2000	Shell Stadium, Geelong	6.2 (38)	5.8 (38)	Draw	0	
2001	Optus Oval, Melbourne	6.11 (47)	7.5 (47)	All-Stars	0 (kickoff)	
2002	Optus Oval, Melbourne	10.3 (63)	10.8 (68)	All-Stars	5	
2003	Telstra Dome, Melbourne	1.10.7 (76)	3.6.12 (75)	Victoria	1	18,611
2004	Telstra Dome, Melbourne	3.7.7 (76)	1.12.4 (85)	All-Stars	9	18,301
2005	Telstra Dome, Melbourne	3.9.6 (87)	0.10.9 (69)	Victoria	18	13,000 (approx.)
2006	Telstra Dome, Melbourne	1.12.7 (88)	5.5.13 (88)	Victoria	0 (kickoff)	13,000 (approx.)
2007	Telstra Dome, Melbourne	1.9.7 (70)	0.13.7 (85)	All-Stars	15	12,897
2008	Telstra Dome, Melbourne	1.10.9 (78)	0.12.8 (80)	All-Stars	2	24,452
2009	Etihad Stadium, Melbourne	0.13.9 (87)	0.11.6 (72)	Victoria	15	20,883
2010	Etihad Stadium, Melbourne	0.12.12 (84)	2.11.7 (91)	All-Stars	7	25,347
2011	Etihad Stadium, Melbourne	4.12.3 (111)	2.13.7 (109)	Victoria	2	25,086
2012	Etihad Stadium, Melbourne	1.15.3 (102)	2.12.6 (96)	Victoria	6	26,221
2013	Etihad Stadium, Melbourne	1.11.10 (85)	0.12.7 (79)	Victoria	6	24,087
2014	Etihad Stadium, Melbourne	0.15.6 (96)	2.10.10 (88)	Victoria	8	27,800
2015	Etihad Stadium, Melbourne	0.11.5 (71)	2.11.11 (95)	All-Stars	24	26,309
2016	Etihad Stadium, Melbourne	0.21.9 (135)	2.17.15 (135)	Victoria	0 (kickoff)	18,074
2017	Etihad Stadium, Melbourne	4.19.6 (156)	0.24.11 (155)	Victoria	1	13,106
2018	Adelaide Oval, Adelaide	2.12.7 (97)	1.15.10 (109)	All-Stars	12	8,000
2019	AAMI Park, Melbourne	33.23 (275)	31.17 (275)	Victoria	0 (kickoff)	6,000
2025	Marvel Stadium, Melbourne	3.11.11 (104)	3.13.7 (112)	All-Stars	8	31,320
2026	Marvel Stadium, Melbourne	6.17.6 (162)	5.14.8 (137)	Victoria	25	29,040

Wins: Victoria: 14, All-Stars: 11, Draws: 1 (4 drawn at the final siren, of which kick-offs decided 3)

Biggest Win: Victoria by 25 points in 2026.

Highest Score: All-Stars and Victoria (275), both in 2019.

Lowest Score: All-Stars and Victoria (38), both in the drawn 2000 match.

Most Man of the Match awards: John Platten 2 (All-Stars), Matthew Lloyd 2 (Victoria)
