= Benjamin Witten =

American chemist (1916–1976)

- Born: October 4, 1916; Baltimore, Maryland, U.S.
- Died: May 2, 1976 (aged 59); Baltimore, Maryland, U.S.
- Spouse: Dorothea Witten
- Children: 1
- Relatives: Louis Witten (brother); Edward Witten (nephew); Matt Witten (nephew); Ilana B. Witten (great-niece); Daniela Witten (great-niece)
- Scientific career
- Fields: Chemistry

Benjamin Witten (October 4, 1916 – May 2, 1976) was an American chemist whose work in chemical research helped shape the development of the U.S. Army's binary weapons system.

== Background ==
Benjamin Witten was born on October 4, 1916, in Baltimore, Maryland, into a family that would later be known for its contributions to science and the arts. His childhood was rooted in the Jewish community of Baltimore, where he attended local schools before enrolling at City College, one of the city's premier high schools. Witten attended Johns Hopkins University, where he pursued studies in chemistry. He completed his doctorate in organic chemistry in 1940, at the age of 24.

== Career at Edgewood Arsenal ==
After earning his Ph.D., Witten joined the Chemical Warfare Service at Edgewood Arsenal in 1940. This marked the beginning of a career that would intertwine scientific innovation with national defense. During World War II, Witten was involved in the development of chemical defense technologies. For his efforts, he was awarded the Department of Defense's Meritorious Civilian Service Award in 1946, one of the highest honors given to federal employees for outstanding achievements. One of Witten's most significant accomplishments came later in his career when he helped develop the Army's binary weapons system. This technology involved creating a toxic agent by combining two non-toxic components, allowing safer handling and storage until deployment. His research demonstrated the practicality of this system, earning him a second Meritorious Civilian Service Award. In 1975, the Maryland Section of the American Chemical Society (ACS) recognized Witten as Maryland Chemist of the Year, citing his contributions to both chemistry and biological sciences.

== Professional achievements and affiliations ==
Witten was a member of several organizations, including the American Chemical Society, the American Association for Cancer Research, the New York Academy of Sciences, and the American Defense Preparedness Association. These affiliations reflect the diverse range of his interests, which extended beyond military applications to include broader scientific and medical concerns. In 1966, Witten was selected for a Secretary of the Army fellowship, which allowed him to spend a year conducting research at Hebrew University of Jerusalem.

== Personal life ==
Benjamin Witten came from a family known for its intellectual achievements. His brother, Louis Witten, was a prominent physicist specializing in the study of gravitation and general relativity. Louis's son, (Benjamin's nephew) Edward Witten, would go on to become one of the most influential theoretical physicists of the modern era, renowned for his work in string theory and mathematical physics. Witten was married to Dorothea ("Dottie") Witten, an active member of the Baltimore Jewish community and a life member of the American Mizrachi Women. Together, they had a son, David Witten, who became a classical pianist. Witten served as a board member of the Anshe Emunah-Aitz Chaim-Tiffereth Israel Congregation (Liberty Jewish Center) in Baltimore.

== Death ==
Benjamin Witten died at his home in Baltimore on May 2, 1976, at the age of 59. His synagogue published an obituary following his death, recognizing his contributions to the congregation. The American Mizrachi Women's Sarah Ribakow Chapter also paid tribute to Witten, noting his support for the organization through his wife's active involvement.
