= Tim Lane (journalist) =

AFL Commentator

- Born: 18 September 1951 (age 75); Launceston, Australia
- Occupations: Journalist, sportscaster
- Years active: 1972−present
- Employer(s): 3AW, Seven Network

Timothy Lane (born 18 September 1951 in Launceston, Tasmania) is a veteran Australian sports broadcaster and journalist who works at the Seven Network and Fairfax. He currently calls Australian rules football (AFL) matches for 3AW radio on Saturday and Sunday afternoons and writes for The Age newspaper. Additionally, beginning in 2018, he is a lead commentator for the Seven Sport test cricket coverage. Between 2003 and 2011, he was also an AFL commentator for Network Ten.

Lane is well known for commentating on a variety of sports for decades—particularly cricket—as well as AFL and as a track-and-field commentator for both the Summer Olympics and Commonwealth Games.

He famously called Cathy Freeman's win for ABC Radio at the Sydney 2000 Olympics.

== Early career ==
Born in Launceston, Lane moved with his family to Devonport in 1963 and matriculated from Devonport High School in 1969. Lane then studied at the University of Tasmania in Hobart, where he resided at St. John Fisher College, but, after failing his first year, found work at an Edgell factory before trying sports commentary.

Lane began his sports broadcasting career in 1972 and was employed by the ABC in 1973, commentating NTFA Australian rules football matches.

== Established media career ==
After some time working for the ABC in Hobart, Lane moved to Melbourne in 1979, where he has been based since. Lane began calling a wide variety of sports, including tennis, cricket, athletics and Australian rules football matches in the Victorian Football League and Australian Football League. He was primarily a radio commentator but also became a regular face on ABC TV, and was a key member of the coverage team for the 1987 VFL season when the television broadcast rights fell to the ABC. In addition, he spent time as the sports presenter for ABC Television's primetime news bulletin in Melbourne.

As a commentator for a wide range of nationally, and occasionally internationally, broadcast sporting events, particularly Australian rules football and cricket, Lane became one of Australia's best-known sports commentators and a prominent personality on the ABC. He was noted for his broad sporting knowledge, detailed commentary, and distinctive broadcasting style. In 1999, he was inducted into the Melbourne Cricket Ground Media Hall of Fame and is now on the panel to select future inductees. He is also a member of the Tasmanian Football Hall of Fame as a legend in the media category.

Lane was involved in a well-publicised dispute with the Nine Network on the eve of the 2002 AFL season. Having been recruited to Nine's AFL commentary team, Lane quit just days before the season's commencement, claiming Nine had refused to honour a stipulation in his contract that Eddie McGuire would not commentate alongside him in matches involving the Collingwood Football Club. Lane held the view that McGuire's role as Collingwood president put him in a conflict of interest, as his freedom to report matters regarding the club would be compromised by his requirement to keep certain inside knowledge confidential. Lane parted ways from Nine and took up a role on Network Ten's AFL coverage in 2003, where he remained until Ten lost the rights at the end of 2011.

Lane resigned from his full-time role with the ABC in 2003 but continued as a part-time AFL commentator on ABC radio, usually only on Friday night games, until the end of 2009. In addition to his role as an AFL commentator for Network Ten, he was also a regular sports columnist for The Age, and he usually appeared fortnightly on Jon Faine's Conversation Hour on ABC Radio across Victoria.

At the end of the 2009 AFL season, Lane left ABC Radio and joined 3AW in 2010 as a replacement for Rex Hunt (who moved to Triple M and has since retired). Lane leads the Sunday pre-match discussion and calls Saturday and Sunday games. He replaced Dennis Cometti (who moved to Triple M) as a Saturday caller. He is also a commentator for Macquarie Media's cricket coverage.

In addition, he called the drawn 2010 AFL Grand Final and Friday Night matches during the 2011 AFL finals series for the station.

Lane is a regular columnist for The Age newspaper in Victoria.

In 2018, Lane joined the Seven Network as a ball-by-ball commentator on its cricket coverage.

== Personal life ==
Tim is the father of sports writer and multi-media personality Samantha Lane and is an avid supporter of the Carlton Football Club. He is a regular swimmer at Prahran Aquatics Centre.
