= Before the Game =

Australian rules football comedy panel television show

- Before the Game Logo used from 2013
- Also known as: After the Game; BTG
- Genre: Comedy / Sport
- Written by: Paul Calleja; Adam Rozenbachs
- Directed by: Peter Ots
- Presented by: Andrew Maher
- Starring: Mick Molloy; Dave Hughes; Anthony Lehmann; Neroli Meadows
- Country of origin: Australia
- Original language: English
- No. of seasons: 11
- No. of episodes: 303

Production
- Production locations: South Yarra, Victoria
- Running time: 30 or 60 minutes
- Production company: Roving Enterprises

Original release
- Network: Network Ten
- Release: 1 March 2003 – 27 September 2013

Before the Game is an Australian rules football comedy panel television show which aired on Network Ten on 1 March 2003 until 27 September 2013. The show was hosted by Andrew Maher with regular panelists Mick Molloy, Dave Hughes, Anthony Lehmann and Neroli Meadows. The format of the show was light-hearted discussion and analysis of Australian Football League (AFL) news and views and included appearances by current players.

== History ==
=== After the Game (2003) ===
Before the Game first aired on 1 March 2003 as After the Game. Originally, it was a half-hour broadcast following the Saturday night AFL match, aired at either 10.30 pm or 11.00 pm (depending on whether the televised match was live or delayed). During the existence of After the Game, the show was rated M and contained occasional profanity. The show was a cult hit. One notable act was when the After the Game team shaved Fraser Gehrig's mullet off at the end of the 2003 Season.

=== Before the Game (2004–2013) ===
The logo for Before the Game 2004–2009

Following the show's success in its late time slot, it was moved to a 6.30 pm time slot on 27 March 2004. When it moved to the primetime slot, to make it more 'family-friendly', it was given a PG rating.

The show originally aired in between the Saturday afternoon and Saturday night telecasts on Ten. Following the end of the 2011 season, the fate of Before the Game was unknown, as Ten had lost its AFL broadcast rights to the Seven Network. However, in 2012, Ten confirmed the show would return, with the entire panel from the previous year in its regular 6:30pm time slot, and that the format may be altered slightly. This was similar to the Nine Network's decision to keep The Footy Show after it lost AFL broadcast rights at the end of the 2006 season. On 21 June 2012, Before the Game moved from Saturdays at 6.30pm to Thursdays at 8.30pm in Victoria, South Australia and Western Australia, and it also aired on One at 10.30pm in New South Wales and Queensland.

In 2013, Before the Game returned to its original time slot of 6:30pm on Saturday. The game broke new ground on 24 August 2013, when it screened on One, the Ten Network's digital channel. The Ten Network was contractually bound to telecast the Bledisloe Cup rugby union test series live on its main channel, hence the change. Fox Sports presenter Neroli Meadows joined the panel in 2013, replacing Sam Lane, who left to join the Seven Network for its Saturday night AFL coverage.

The show was axed on 13 December 2013.

== Presenters ==
=== Host ===
- Andrew Maher (2005–2013)

=== Regular panelists ===
- Mick Molloy (2007–2013)
- Dave Hughes (2003–2013)
- Anthony Lehmann (2004–2013)
- Neroli Meadows (2013)

Ryan ‘Fitzy’ Fitzgerald, and Peter Helliar, playing Bryan Strauchan/‘Strauchanie’, make regular cameo appearances.

=== Former panelists ===
- Anthony Hudson (2003–2004)
- Bryan Strauchan
- Peter Helliar (2003–2006)
- Sam Lane (2003–2012)
- Damian Callinan (2003)

== Recurring segments ==
=== Tool of the Week ===
The "Tool of the Week" is an award given by Dave Hughes and sponsored by Home Hardware. The award was given to a particularly embarrassing performance by somebody related to the AFL, either on or off the field. The "best" or most memorable of these tools is given the "Tool of the Year".

Tool of the Year Annual Winners
Year	Winner(s)	AFL Club(s)	Offence
2013	Eddie McGuire	Collingwood Football Club President	Refusing to hand the football to a young Carlton Football Club supporter at an event.
2012	Matthew Boyd	Western Bulldogs	Only allowing a passionate member of the Western Bulldogs cheer squad to kiss his sweaty neck after a match.
2011	Guy McKenna	Gold Coast Football Club	Showing no emotion or facial movement during a pre-game interview with Jason Dunstall and Mick Malthouse.
2010	Jobe Watson	Essendon Football Club	Checking out an old woman.
2009	Neil Balme	Geelong Football Club Football Operations Manager	Exiting a toilet in the players change rooms and simulating a bowel movement.
2008	Dale Thomas	Collingwood Football Club	Filming his video blog while in the shower.
2007	Robert Copeland	Brisbane Football Club	Wearing a "man-bra" before a football match.
2006	Nick Dal Santo	St Kilda Football Club	Wearing rather inappropriately coloured bathers to the beach.
2005	Tony Pasquale (non-AFL player)	Subiaco Grounds Manager	Pestering umpires and players on match day on numerous occasions.
2004	Brett Voss	St Kilda Football Club	Publicly changing his bathers in front of the camera.
2003	Shane Wakelin, Shane Woewodin, Alan Didak, Matthew Lokan, Jason Cloke, Chris Tarrant	Collingwood Football Club	Participation in Sunsilk shampoo advertisement: Very poor acting.

=== Headlines you might have missed ===
Each week, panel members took turns at reading out humorous, fictional football-related newspaper headlines. This usually involved The Australian, The Age and Herald Sun newspapers.

=== Holden round the Block ===
In 2013, a new segment called 'Holden round the Block' started. Lehmo and either Mick Molloy or Dave Hughes pick up a player and chatted while they cruised around a local neighbourhood.

=== BTG Super Spray ===
This segment began in 2013 and involved Dave Hughes attending a selected team's training and 'stirring them up' with humorous asides about their club and various players. Hughes would reprise this role on The Footy Show.

=== The Clean Team ===
This segment, started in 2013, involved highlighting in a humorous way players who could not possibly be involved with alleged drug problems, allegedly involving certain AFL clubs.

=== In Da House with Strauchanie ===
In 2013, fictional former Collingwood hopeful and football tragic, Bryan "Strauchanie" Strauchan (played by Peter Helliar), returned for an occasional segment called 'In Da House with Strauchanie'.

=== Lehmo's Footy Clinic ===
In this segment, Lehmo talks about a particular football skill, then shows footage of a player embarrassingly stuffing it up.

== Former segments ==
=== Fitzy's Make A Wish Foundation ===
Ryan Fitzgerald would go to a child's house as a surprise. Fitzy took them to their supported clubs and/or to meet their favourite player(s). Footballers involved have included Bryan Strauchan, Brendan Fevola, Scott West, Jason Akermanis and Adam Selwood.

=== Until the Fat Lady Sings ===
When the show started, there was a segment called "The Game's Not Over Until the Fat Lady Sings", where an overweight lady would go to a game and sing when she thought that the game was over. This segment was scrapped due to the fat lady being fired for singing after the siren had gone. The part of the fat lady was played by Pauline Smith (née Henderson).

=== Diary of a Footballer ===
"Diary of a Footballer" was a segment in which a well-known footballer would read out a page of their diary.

=== Jumping in Hot Water ===
Sponsored by Aquamax, a company that produces water heating units, a football player had to answer ten questions about the history of their football club. The junior football club of the player with the highest score at the end of the year would receive a hot water system.

Jumping in Hot Water Winner
Year	Winner	AFL Club	Score	Junior Club
2006	David Wirrpanda	West Coast Eagles	9/10	Healesville Football Club

The segment was replaced by Inside 60 in 2007, a segment that had appeared on the show in much earlier seasons.

=== Inside 60 with Dave Hughes ===
This involved Hughes asking questions, most of them being funny, in which many players continually laugh. It lasted 60 seconds, finishing with a siren.

=== Banners ===
In the Banners segment, each comedic panelist created a banner for a specific football club, often to reflect events scrutinised by the media.

=== Bryan Strauchan's earlier segments ===
Bryan Strauchan was formerly a regular segment on the show following fictional talentless, egotistical "youngster" Bryan Strauchan (played by Peter Helliar) as he tried to make a career for himself at the Collingwood Football Club. The segments were presented as a mockumentary and featured similar comedy stylings to The Office and similar shows. He also used the catchphrase "Strauchanie", usually when he was referring to himself.

Bryan Strauchan is also known as Bryan "Superstar" Strauchan and "Strauchanie". On the 2006 Grand Final episode of Before the Game, he was involved in a Wayne Carey-like incident, and this forced him to leave the Collingwood Football Club and look for a new home in 2007. Strauchanie had expressed an interest in the Western Bulldogs, but he would not rule out a move to the Kangaroos. Strauchanie looked far from making his AFL debut match, but he did not give up the hard work he has shown at Collingwood Football Club. Bryan Strauchan's overwhelming success on this show has led to him releasing a DVD: Strauchanie: Pure BS.

== Production details ==
Before the Game was produced by Roving Enterprises, the TV production company owned by Rove McManus, an Australian television personality who appeared on his own comedy/interview show Rove, formerly known as Rove Live. Peter Helliar and Dave Hughes were also regulars on the show. The program was filmed at Channel Ten studios in Melbourne.
