= Ilana B. Witten =

American neuroscientist

- Born: Princeton, New Jersey, U.S.
- Education: Princeton University; Stanford University
- Known for: Optogenetics and role of cholinergic interneurons in addiction
- Parents: Edward Witten (father); Chiara Nappi (mother)
- Relatives: Daniela Witten (sister); Louis Witten (grandfather); Matt Witten (uncle); Benjamin Witten (great-uncle)
- Awards: Daniel X Freedman Prize; NYSCF-Robertson Neuroscience Investigator Award; McKnight Scholars Award in Neuroscience; NIH Director's New Innovator Award
- Scientific career
- Fields: Neuroscience
- Workplaces: Princeton University
- Doctoral advisor: Eric Knudsen

Ilana B. Witten is an American neuroscientist and professor of psychology and neuroscience at Princeton University. Witten studies the mesolimbic pathway, with a focus on the striatal neural circuit mechanisms driving reward learning and decision making.

== Early life and education ==
Witten grew up in Princeton, New Jersey, where her parents were both professors at Princeton University. Her father, Edward Witten, is a theoretical physicist and professor of mathematics at Princeton University, and her mother, Chiara Nappi is a professor of physics. Witten attended Princeton High School in her hometown and then stayed close to home attending Princeton University for her undergraduate education. Witten's sister, Daniela Witten, pursued an undergraduate degree in mathematics and biology at Stanford University.

At Princeton, Witten majored in physics, but it was during her undergraduate degree that she became fascinated by biology, specifically neuroscience. During her first year at Princeton, Witten worked as a research assistant in the lab of Lee Merrill Silver, studying molecular biology and genetics. Later in her undergraduate degree, Witten joined the lab of Michael J. Berry, where she conducted research towards her undergraduate thesis in computational neuroscience. Her undergraduate honors thesis was titled "Testing for Metabolic Efficiency in the Neural Code of the Retina" and was awarded by the Department of Physics. Witten graduated with an A.B. in physics in 2002 at Princeton.

Inspired by her undergraduate research experiences, Witten pursued her graduate education in neuroscience at Stanford University in 2003. Under the mentorship of Eric Knudsen, Witten explored the neurobiological mechanisms of attention and strategies of information processing in the central nervous system of owls.

=== Sensory Information Processing in Barn Owls ===
Prediction is a fundamental neural computation performed by the brain to mediate appropriate behavioral responses to changing and uncertain environments. In Witten's early graduate work, she explored how a specific neural circuit in the barn owl predicts the location of motion auditory stimuli. The optical tectum is an area of the barn owl brain that helps to orient an owls gaze towards an auditory stimulus, and this is enabled by neurons encoding information from the auditory system to make a topographic map of auditory space. Witten wanted to understand how this topographic map changes when auditory stimuli are moving. She found that auditory receptive fields both sharpen and shift with stimulus position, showing that auditory fields make predictive shifts to track the location of auditory stimuli.

Witten then became interested in exploring how the brain detects a singular object when it must integrate a variety of sensory stimuli and information from various channels. Using a Hebbian Plasticity model, Witten proposed that the synaptic plasticity underlying object detection and representation in the brain results from the difference in spatial representations of one type of input relative to that of another. She found that the amount of plasticity for each channel of sensory input depended on the strength and the width of the receptive field for that channel. With stronger inputs guiding plasticity, this could account for the development and maintenance of aligned sensory representations in the brain.

=== Using Optogenetics to Dissect Reward Circuits ===
After defending her PhD in 2008, Witten stayed at Stanford to conduct her postdoctoral studies in the lab of Karl Deisseroth. Under Deisseroth's mentorship, Witten learned how to use optogenetic technologies to dissect genetically defined cell types within neural circuits, and Witten's particular interest was cholinergic neurons in the brain's reward circuitry. In a first author paper in Science, published in 2010, Witten dissected the role of cholinergic neurons in the nucleus accumbens which, although they make up only 1% of the local neurons, play significant roles in modulating circuitry and driving behavior. She further found that these cholinergic interneurons were activated by cocaine administration, yet silencing them lead to increased medium spiny neuron activity in the NaC and prevented cocaine conditioning in mice. Witten's finding highlighted the critical role such a small population of neurons can play in mediating behavioral outcomes.

Since inhibition of cholinergic interneurons in the striatum ameliorated drug-induced conditioning, Witten and Deisseroth filed a patent for the use of optogenetic technologies in cholinergic interneurons in the NAc or striatum. They proposed to first use the technology to better understand reward behaviors and addiction in rodent models, and later to target specific neural circuits in the treatment of addiction disorders in humans through the administration of opsin encoding polynucleotides into the striatum. Through optical or electrical stimulation, this technology would enable temporally-precise treatment strategies for those suffering from addiction.

Witten then wanted to apply optogenetics to rat models to explore neural reward circuitry, so she created Th::Cre and Chat::Cre driver lines in rats. With these novel driver lines, Witten injected viruses to express Cre-dependent opsins in the rat brain to clarify the causal relationship between dopamine neuron firing and positive reinforcement in her novel rate driver lines. Witten did confirm that stimulating Ventral Tegmental Area Dopamine neurons in Th::Cre rats did produce intracranial self-stimulation which highlighted the power of her tool for dissecting specific neural circuits in rats using optogenetics, which was previously not possible.

Witten continued to explore cholinergic circuits in the striatum and the role of dopamine neurons in driving reward behaviors throughout her time in the Deisseroth Lab and became co-author on many papers during her four-year tenure in the lab.

== Career and research ==
Following postdoctoral work in the Deisseroth Lab, Witten was recruited to Princeton University in 2012 to become an assistant professor of psychology and neuroscience within the Princeton Neuroscience Institute and Department of Psychology. Witten started her lab at Princeton and was dedicated to exploring the neural circuits driving reward learning and decision making in rodent models. Through the use of techniques like optogenetics, rodent behavior, electrophysiology, imaging, and computational modeling, Witten and her team are able to discover novel mechanisms by which striatal and other reward circuitry drive behaviors. In 2018, Ilana was promoted to associate professor and granted tenure at Princeton University.

In addition to her role as a principal investigator, Witten is a member of the committee for PNI graduate student admissions, a member of committee to select URMs for PNI summer program, a member of the committee for redesigning the graduate student curriculum, as well as many other committee roles to support her Princeton neuroscience community. Witten also teaches many classes at Princeton and is a member of BRAIN CoGS (Circuits of Cognitive Systems), a 7-lab NIH funded project to understand how working memory function underlies decision making.

=== Dissecting Reward Circuitry ===
In 2016, Witten and her team at Princeton published a paper looking at the distinct functions of different populations of midbrain dopamine neurons defined by their striatal target region. They found that dopamine neurons that project to the ventral striatum have stronger responses to reward consumption and reward predicting cues where as the dopamine neurons that project to the dorsomedial striatum respond robustly to contralateral choices. Though both subpopulations displayed reward-prediction error, Witten's findings show that distinct dopamine terminal input locations support specialization of function in the striatum.

Continuing to study striatal neurons implicated in reward learning, Witten returned to findings from her postdoctoral work on cholinergic striatal interneurons to probe the connection between their activity profiles, synaptic plasticity, and reward learning. Witten and her team found that activity of cholinergic neurons regulates extinction learned cocaine-context associations. Further, cholinergic neurons mediate a sustained reduction in presynaptic glutamatergic input into the medium spiny neurons of the striatum. This work highlighted, for the first time, the modulatory role of cholinergic interneurons in the striatum.

=== Circuits Encoding Social and Spatial Information ===
Since social interaction is intrinsically rewarding, Witten became interested in shaping part of her research program around understanding social information processing within the dopaminergic reward system. In 2017, Witten and her team explored a unique subset of prelimbic (PL) cortical neurons implicated in social behavior that project to the nucleus accumbens (NAc), amygdala, and ventral tegmental area. Interestingly, activation of the PL-NAc projection lead to decreased social preference, so Witten and her team sought to understand what information this projection was conveying. They found that it conveyed both spatial and social information that allowed the formation of social-spatial associations to guide social behavior.

=== Diverse Dopamine Neuron Encoding ===
Witten and her colleagues then examined the dopaminergic neurons in the VTA more rigorously. Though these neurons are canonically associated with reward circuitry, they have been implicated in various other behavioral variables, so Witten was interested in looking at their ability to encode reward, reward predicting cues, reward history, spatial position, kinematics, and behavioral choice. Through in vivo calcium imaging, Witten and her team found functional clusters of VTA DA neurons associated with both reward associated and non-reward associated variables, and these neurons were also spatially clustered within the VTA.

== Awards and honors ==
- 2017 Daniel X Freedman Prize for Exceptional Basic Research
- 2017-2022 NYSCF-Robertson Neuroscience Investigator Award
- 2017-2022 Simons Collaboration on the Global Brain Investigator
- 2017-2022 Co-PI on BRAIN Initiative U19
- 2015-2019 NIH R01 (from NIMH) 2015 PNI Innovation Award
- 2014-2016 McKnight Scholars Award in Neuroscience
- 2014-2017 Co-PI on BRAIN Initiative U01
- 2014-2015 NARSAD Young Investigator Award
- 2014 Award from Essig and Enright '82 Innovation Fund
- 2013-2017 Pew Scholarship in the Biomedical Sciences
- 2013-2015 Alfred P. Sloan Research Fellowship
- 2013 Winter Conference Brain Research Travel Award
- 2012-2017 NIH Director's New Innovator Award
- 2009-2012 Helen Hay Whitney Foundation Postdoctoral Fellowship
- 2008 Swartz Travel Fellowship for CoSyNe
- 2008 2003-2006 NSF Graduate Research Fellowship
- 2002 Allen G. Shenstone Prize in physics
- 2002 High honors awarded by the Princeton Department of Physics
- 2002 Sigma Xi Research Honor Society nomination
- 2000 Lucent Technology Prize of the Princeton Department of Physics
- 1998 Edward J. Bloustein Scholarship

== Select publications ==
- Combined social and spatial coding in a descending projection from prefrontal cortex. Murugan M, Park M, Jang HJ, Miller E, Taliaferro J, Cox J, Parker NF, Bhave V, Nectow A, Pillow J, Witten IB. Cell. Dec 2017.
- Dissociated sequential activity and stimulus encoding in striatal neurons during spatial working memory. Akhlaghpour H, Wiskerke J, Choi JY, Taliaferro J, Au J, Witten IB. eLife. 2016; 10.7554/eLife.19507.
- Linking cholinergic interneurons, synaptic plasticity, and behavior during the extinction of a cocaine-context association. Lee J, Finkelstein J, Choi JY, Witten IB. Neuron. 2016 May 18.
- Reward and choice encoding in terminals of midbrain dopamine neurons depends on striatal target. Parker NF, Cameron C, Taliaferro J, Choi JY, Lee J, Davidson T, Daw ND, Witten IB. Nature Neuroscience. 2016 Apr 25. doi:10.1038/nn.4287.
- Mesolimbic dopamine dynamically tracks, and is causally linked to, discrete aspects of value-based decision making. Saddoris MP, Sugam JA, Stuber GD, Witten IB, Deisseroth K, Carelli RM. Biol Psychiatry. 2015 May 15;77(10):903-11. doi: 10.1016/j.biopsych.2014.10.024. Epub 2014 Nov 13.
- Optical suppression of drug-evoked phasic dopamine release. McCutcheon JE, Cone JJ, Sinon CG, Fortin SM, Kantak PA, Witten IB, Deisseroth K, Stuber GD, Roitman MF. Front Neural Circuits. 2014 Sep 17;8:114. doi: 10.3389/fncir.2014.00114. eCollection 2014.
- Recombinase-driver rat lines: tools, techniques, and optogenetic application to dopamine-mediated reinforcement. Witten IB*, Steinberg E*, Lee SY, DavidsoTJ, Zalocusky KA, Brodsky M, Yizhar O, Cho SL, Gong S, Ramakrishnan C, Stuber GD, Tye K, Janak P, Deisseroth K. Neuron. 2011 Dec 8;72(5):721-33.
- Cholinergic interneurons control local circuit activity and cocaine conditioning. Witten IB*, Lin S*, Brodsky M*, Prakash R*, Diester I, Anikeeva P, Gradinaru V, Ramakrishnan C, Deisseroth K. Science. 2010. 330(6011):1677-81.
- A dominance hierarchy of auditory spatial cues in barn owls. Witten IB, Knudsen PF, Knudsen EI. PLoS ONE. 2010; 5(4): e10396.
- A Hebbian learning rule mediates asymmetric plasticity in aligning sensory representations. Witten IB, Knudsen EI, Sompolinsky H. Journal of Neurophysiology. 2008; 100(2): 1067–79.
- Dynamic shifts in the owl's auditory space map predict moving sound location. Witten IB*, Bergan JF*, Knudsen EI. Nature Neuroscience. 2006; 9(11):1439- 45.
- Why seeing is believing: merging auditory and visual worlds. Witten IB, Knudsen EI. Neuron. 2005; 48(3):489-96.
