= Daniela Witten =

American biostatistician

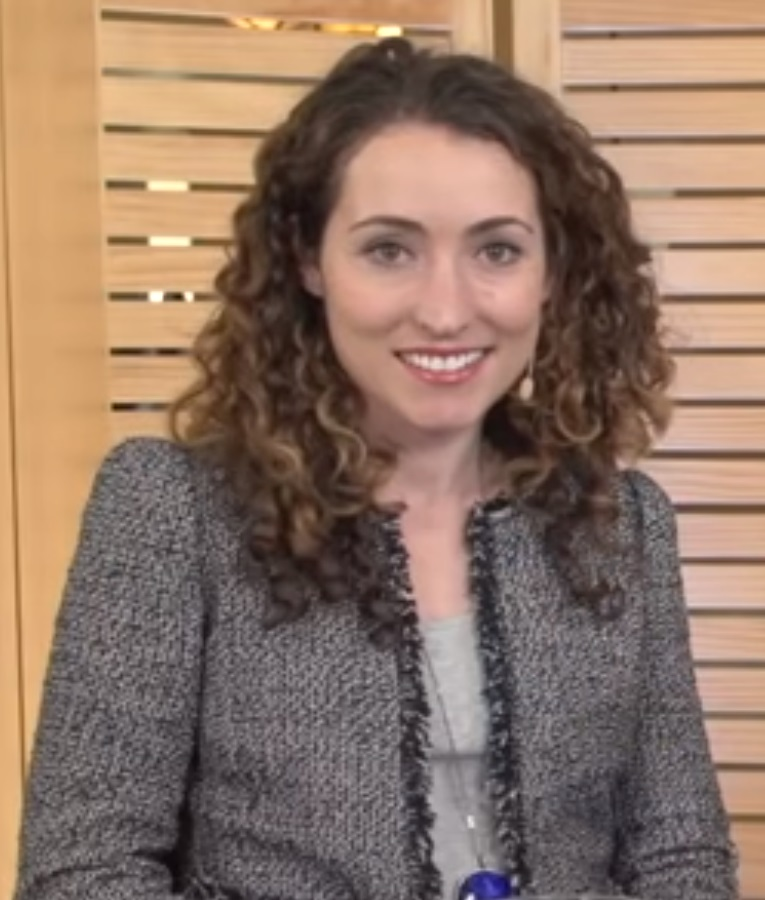
- Witten at the SiliconAngle digital community TheCube in 2018
- Education: Stanford University (BS, PhD)
- Known for: An Introduction to Statistical Learning
- Spouse: Ari Steinberg
- Parents: Edward Witten (father); Chiara Nappi (mother)
- Relatives: Ilana B. Witten (sister); Louis Witten (grandfather); Matt Witten (uncle); Benjamin Witten (great-uncle)
- Awards: Forbes 30 Under 30 (2012–2014); National Science Foundation CAREER Award (2013); Mortimer Spiegelman Award (2019); COPSS Presidents' Award (2022)
- Scientific career
- Fields: Statistics; Machine learning
- Workplaces: University of Washington
- Thesis: A penalized matrix decomposition, and its applications (2010)
- Doctoral advisor: Robert Tibshirani
- Website: www.danielawitten.com

Daniela M. Witten is an American biostatistician. She is a professor and the Dorothy Gilford Endowed Chair of Mathematical Statistics at the University of Washington. Her research investigates the use of machine learning to understand high-dimensional data.

== Early life and education ==
Witten studied mathematics and biology at Stanford University, graduating in 2005. She remained there for her postgraduate research, earning a master's degree in statistics in 2006. She was awarded the American Statistical Association Gertrude Mary Cox Scholarship in 2008. Her doctoral thesis, A penalized matrix decomposition, and its applications was supervised by Robert Tibshirani. She worked with Trevor Hastie on canonical correlation analysis. She co-authored An Introduction to Statistical Learning in 2013.

== Research and career ==
Witten applies statistical machine learning to personalised medical treatments and decoding the genome. She uses machine learning to analyse data sets in neuroscience and genomics. She is worried about increasing amounts of data in biomedical sciences.

She was appointed to the University of Washington as Genentech Endowed Professor in 2010. Witten contributed to the 2012 report Evolution of Translational Omics, which provided best practise in translating omics research into a clinic.

She is an associate editor for the Journal of the American Statistical Association.

== Recognition ==
She was elected as a Fellow of the American Statistical Association in 2020. She was named to the 2022 class of Fellows of the Institute of Mathematical Statistics, for "substantial contributions to the field of statistical machine learning, with applications to biology; and for communicating the fundamental ideas in the field to a broad audience".

She was awarded an NIH Director's Early Independence Award in 2011. She was awarded the American Statistical Association David P. Byar Young Investigator Award for her work Penalized Classification Using Fisher’s Linear Discriminant in 2011. Her book An Introduction to Statistical Learning won a Technometrics Ziegel Award in 2014. She won an Elle magazine Genius Award in 2012. In 2013 she won an Alfred P. Sloan Foundation Fellowship. She was named in the Forbes 30 Under 30 Science & Healthcare category in 2012, 2013 and 2014. In 2015 Witten was awarded the Texas A&M University Raymond J. Carroll Young Investigator Award. In 2018, she was named a Simons Foundation Investigator, and in 2022, she received the COPSS Presidents' Award.

== Personal life ==
Witten is the younger sister of Ilana B. Witten, the older sister of Rafael Witten, and the daughter of the physicists Chiara Nappi and Edward Witten. She is married to software engineer Ari Steinberg.
