= Strauchanie =

Bryan Strauchan
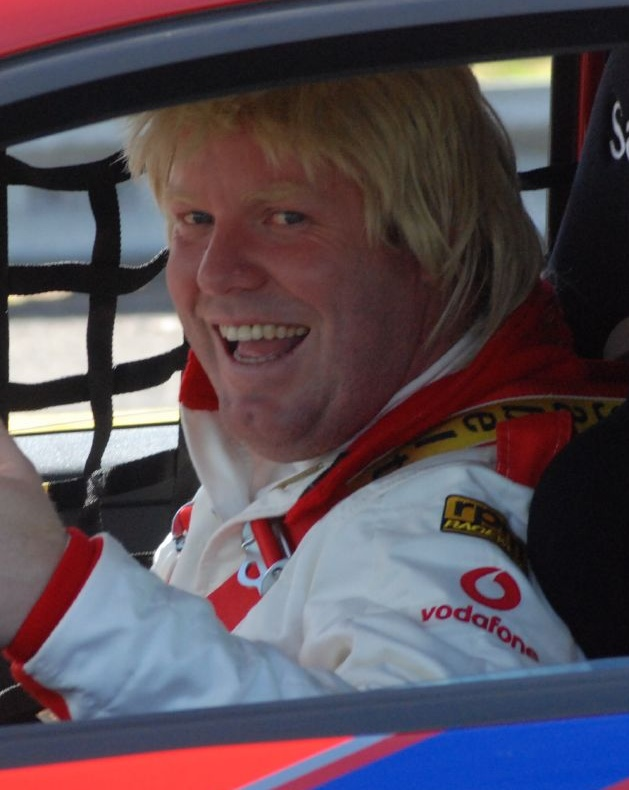
- Peter Helliar as Bryan Strauchan in 2008

Personal information
- Full name: Bryan Keith Strauchan
- Born: 1984 (age 41–42); Horsham, Victoria
- Original team: Horsham Reserves
- Draft: Final pick, 2004 National Draft

Playing career^{1}
Years	Club	Games (Goals)
2004–2009; 2025-	Collingwood	0 (0)

Representative team honours^{2}
Years	Team	Games (Goals)
2007–2012	Victoria (Legends Game)	
- ^{1} Playing statistics correct to the end of 2009.^{2} Representative statistics correct as of 2008.

Career highlights
- Final Pick National Draft 2004; Captain of the Asian Team of the Century; E. J. Whitten Legends Game: 2007–2012; Co-captain of Victoria (EJ Whitten Legends Game): 2008

Bryan Keith Strauchan (pronounced "Strawn"), better known as "Strauchanie" (pronounced "Strawny"), is a fictional Australian rules football player portrayed by Peter Helliar.

Strauchanie's character was represented as a talentless, overweight bogan, oblivious to his lack of ability, who fictionally occupied a position on the real-life Collingwood Football Club's playing list. Through regular sketches on football panel show Before the Game, Strauchanie became popular for combining country football stereotypes with jokes about contemporary issues in the AFL.

During the character's period of popularity, Helliar often made celebrity appearances in charity sports events in character as Strauchan.

== Fictional biography ==
Bryan Strauchan was born in 1984 to Roy and Soy Bean Strauchan in the country town of Horsham, Victoria. He is of Asian descent through his maternal parentage, although his appearance shows no physical Asian traits, and was fictionally named captain of All-Asian Team of the Century. He is renowned for his illeism (i.e., referring to himself in the third person).

He played his formative years of football in Horsham, reaching no higher than the reserves; nevertheless, he was selected by the Collingwood Football Club with the last pick in the 2004 National Draft. Strauchan's progress was hampered by weight issues, lack of speed, lack of skills, and a crippling peanut allergy. He wore guernsey number 59, indicative of his mediocrity since guernsey numbers above the mid-40s are only usually worn by reserves players with minimal senior prospects. He never made his Australian Football League (AFL) debut, although in one 2005 sketch he was purportedly named in the senior team for Collingwood's match against Sydney in 2005, but accidentally locked himself in a stairwell and missed the game. He has his own football card that describing all of his mediocre abilities. He announced his retirement from Collingwood in early April 2009.

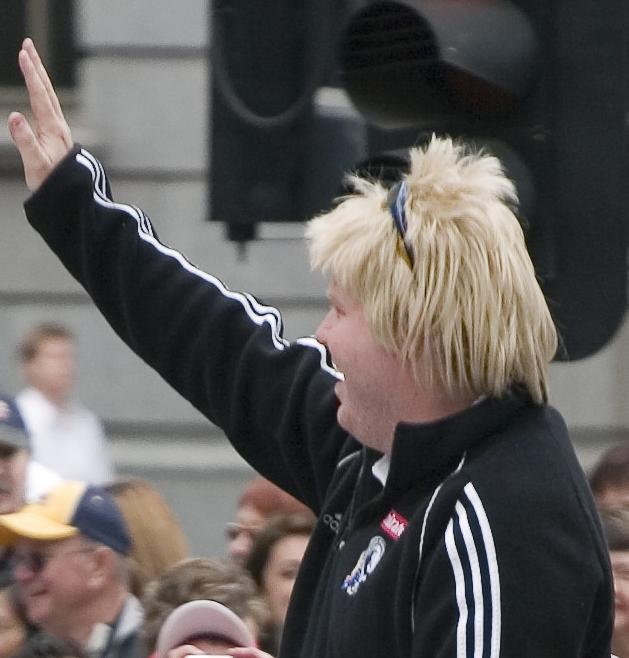
Bryan Strauchan at the 2006 AFL Grand Final match

For the role, Helliar dons a blonde mullet wig and attempts to play up an Australian bogan (a stereotypical unsophisticated Australian) stereotype. The comedy is achieved by self-effacing humor, putting Strauchan in situations that highlight his weight, lack of fitness, and general inability, while his egotistical personality and delusions of grandeur mean he is completely unaware of these weaknesses.

Strauchan was a recurring character on the show Before the Game, which features regular 2- to 5-minute segments about the goings-on in Strauchan's life. Collingwood Football Club personalities, including coach Mick Malthouse, president Eddie McGuire and various senior players, appeared and co-operated with sketches that pretend to place Strauchan inside the real-life workings of the club.

== Other appearances ==
Helliar made several celebrity appearances as Strauchan in promotional sports events. This most notably included the E. J. Whitten Legends Game, a then-annual sports entertainment charity Australian rules football match featuring celebrities and retired players, in which Strauchan featured six times between 2007 and 2012. He was co-captain of the Victorian team in the match in 2008, and man of the match after kicking three goals in 2009. Helliar was twice injured playing the match, injuring his ankle in 2009 and his lower leg in 2012.

Helliar's other appearances as Strauchan included:

- Hosting a comedy segment at the 2006 Brownlow Medal count.
- Appearing in the Australian Football League's membership advertisements.
- Participating in the Twenty20 Celebrity Challenge, a charity cricket match played for the Shane Warne Foundation.
- Participating in the 2008 Australian Grand Prix celebrity race.
- Appearing at the Big Freeze in 2015 to help fight motor neuron disease.
- Doing crunches in 2020 to help support Redkite, a charity that supports young cancer patients up to the ages of 18.
- During an episode of I'm a Celebrity...Get Me Out of Here! in 2023, in which Helliar was a contestant.

In 2012, in a move by the fans, Strauchanie was voted President of the Melbourne Renegades.

== Merchandise ==

Hellier wrote an autobiography for Strauchan, entitled, Bryan Strauchan – My Story: The Rise And Rise Of A Genuine Superstar Of Australian Sport. In it, Strauchan talks about his Horsham days, playing for Collingwood, and being Chinese. Strauchan, released the autobiography in front of a packed media conference at Collingwood's headquarters, the Lexus Centre, with Nathan Buckley helping promote it.

A DVD featuring all of Strauchan's clips was released in 2006. The DVD is titled as Strauchanie – Pure B.S., which is a play on words, as the "B.S." in the title can refer both to Strauchan's initials and also the word "bullshit". The video has since been uploaded to YouTube in full.
