= DSST Public Schools =

Charter schools in Colorado, US

Location
- Denver and Aurora, Colorado; United States; 39°44′52″N 104°53′27″W

Information
- Type: Charter
- Established: 2004 (22 years ago)
- Founder: David Ethan Greenberg
- School district: Denver Public Schools
- Grades: 6-12, Aurora Science & Tech; 6-12, Cedar; 6-10, Elevate Northeast; 6-12, Cole; 6-12, College View; 6-12, Conservatory Green; 6-12, Green Valley Ranch; 6-12, Montview
- Campus type: Urban
- Admissions: Lottery
- Website: School website

DSST Public Schools (DSST), formerly known as the Denver School of Science and Technology, is a public charter STEM network comprising 16 schools on eight campuses in Denver and Aurora, Colorado, United States, in partnership with Denver Public Schools. DSST is ranked among the top 200 public high schools in the US.

== Overview ==
Metropolitan area students are selected for admission entirely by a lottery. As students follow a science, mathematics, and technology focused liberal arts education, more than half of the graduates declare a STEM major in college. Students of color comprise 80 percent of the student body and 68 percent qualify for free or reduced lunch. All DSST students follow a prospectus that includes seven years of natural sciences, seven years of mathematics, three years of Spanish, a trimester internship, and a two-trimester senior project.

== History ==
DSST was founded in 2004 at Park Hill in northeast Denver by David Ethan Greenberg, who also served as the first board chair of its successor organization, DSST Public Schools. Bill Kurtz, a former investment banker at JP Morgan, is founding principal.

=== Leadership ===
In 2024, it was announced that Nella García Urban would replace Bill Kurtz as CEO. García Urban worked in Texas's YES Charter Network prior to her appointment as CEO of DSST.

=== Network Growth ===
As its original campus, DSST: Montview (previously Stapleton, after KKK member and Denver Mayor Benjamin Stapleton) opened as a single high school in 2004, and graduated its first class in 2008. A sister middle school was also opened in 2008, expanding the campus to 6-12.

The Green Valley Ranch (GVR) middle school campus opened in 2010 along with the DSST Home Office, followed by the GVR high school and Cole middle school in 2011. The following year, the College View middle school opened.

In 2013, the Cedar (previously Byers) middle school campus opened. It was slated to occupy the building previously used by the Denver School of the Arts (DSA). The Cedar building was still undergoing $19 million in renovation, and its inaugural year was at the Calvary Temple Pearl Church in the Cherry Creek neighborhood.

In 2014, the Cole high school and Conservatory Green middle school opened. The following year, the College View high school opened. In 2016, both the Cedar high school and Henry middle school opened. By 2017, Conservatory Green opened its high school and in 2018 DSST opened a middle school at the Noel campus.

The first campus in Aurora opened in 2019 as Aurora Science and Tech (AST).

In October 2020, the DPS school board denied a request to open a corresponding high school for the DSST Noel campus. The following day, DSST appealed the decision and in November 2020, the State Board of Education granted the appeal to open a high school instead at the Elevate campus, opening the door for Noel middle school students to continue locally at a DSST campus.

Following the appeal win, DSST opened the Elevate Northeast campus in 2021. In the same year, the Henry campus closed and consolidated with the College View campus. In 2022, the AST high school opened. The Noel middle school also moved to the Elevate campus and took on the Elevate Middle School name.

== Recognition ==
According to the 2015 U.S. News & World Report ranking of American public high schools, the Stapleton campus was nationally ranked 192nd, 158th in STEM education, 55th among charter schools, and 5th in Colorado. In the same year, the school was ranked 5th in mathematics proficiency, tied for 15th in reading proficiency, and was ranked 5th in college readiness, in the state. In a 2014 Denver School Performance report, five of the top six schools in Denver were part of DSST.

Since graduating its first class in 2008, 100 percent of DSST: Montview and DSST: Green Valley Ranch seniors have been accepted to a four-year university. In April 2026, DSST Public Schools' celebrated its 18th consecutive year of achieving 100 percent college acceptance across its campuses in Denver and Aurora.

DSST is recognized for its values-centered culture, daily emphasizing respect and responsibility, and has been regarded as one of the top mid-size workplaces in Colorado.

== Demographics ==
Statistics, 2017 school year (all in %)
	Male	Female	Free/reduced lunch 2015-16	Black/African American	Asian	Hispanic/ Latino	White
DSST: Cedar (middle)	53	47	45	12	5	30	48
DSST: Cedar (high)	61	39	45	11	4	30	47
DSST: Cole (middle)	54	46	91	16	1	78	4
DSST: Cole (high)	53	47	79	18	3	69	9
DSST: College View (middle)	52	48	93	1	5	91	5
DSST: College View (high)	53	47	89	1	5	87	4
DSST: Conservatory Green (middle)	55	45	64	27	5	46	17
DSST: Conservatory Green (high)	55	45	59	25	3	48	15
DSST: Green Valley Ranch (middle)	50	50	79	23	8	60	5
DSST: Green Valley Ranch (high)	52	48	73	21	11	56	8
DSST: Montview (middle)	51	49	69	31	3	41	16
DSST: Montview (high)	54	46	52	25	5	35	28
DSST: Henry (middle)	57	43	86	3	6	74	13
Notes No available data for DSST Elevate @ Noel Campus (opened 2018-2019) No available data for DSST: Elevate (Opened 2021-22)

== Support ==
Donors have played a significant role in the establishment and expansion of DSST. Notable contributions include a $7 million gift by Liberty Media chairman John C. Malone, a $3 million grant by the Daniels Fund, $1 million gift by media mogul Oprah Winfrey, a $1 million donation by the Anna and John Sie Foundation, a $500,000 grant by the Thiry-O'Leary Foundation, and a $50,000 grant by the Bill and Melinda Gates Foundation.
