= Samantha Lane =

Australian sports writer

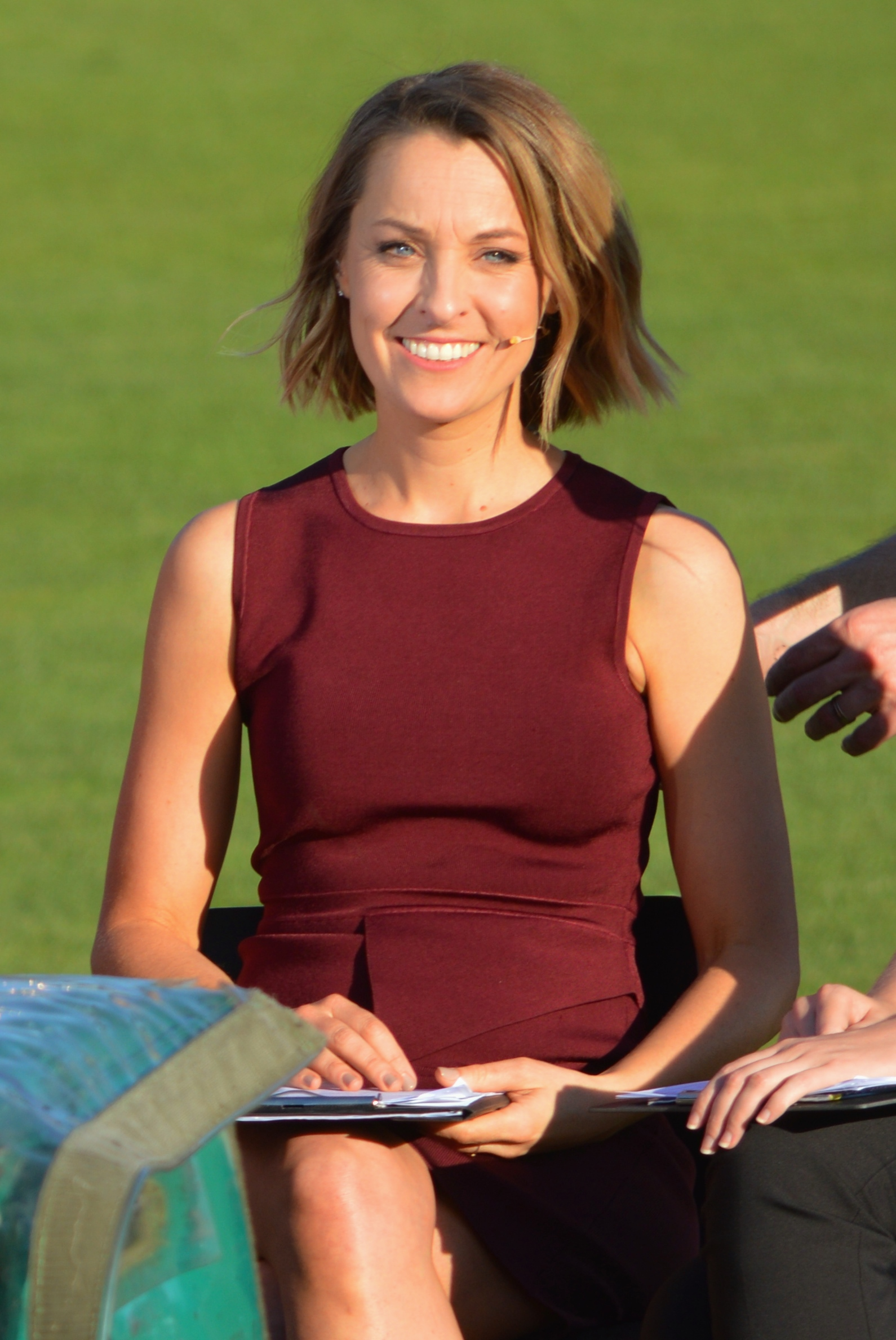
- Lane during Seven Network's pre-game coverage prior to the inaugural AFL Women's match in February 2017
- Born: Samantha Lane; Australia
- Occupations: Australian sports writer, television and radio personality
- Years active: 2003–present
- Employer: Seven Network
- Parent: Tim Lane

Samantha Lane is an Australian sports journalist. Specialising in the Australian Football League (AFL), she also wrote on a range of other sports for The Age, and was a panellist on Before The Game (about AFL) on Network Ten for over a decade. She is the daughter of veteran journalist and commentator Tim Lane.

== Journalism ==
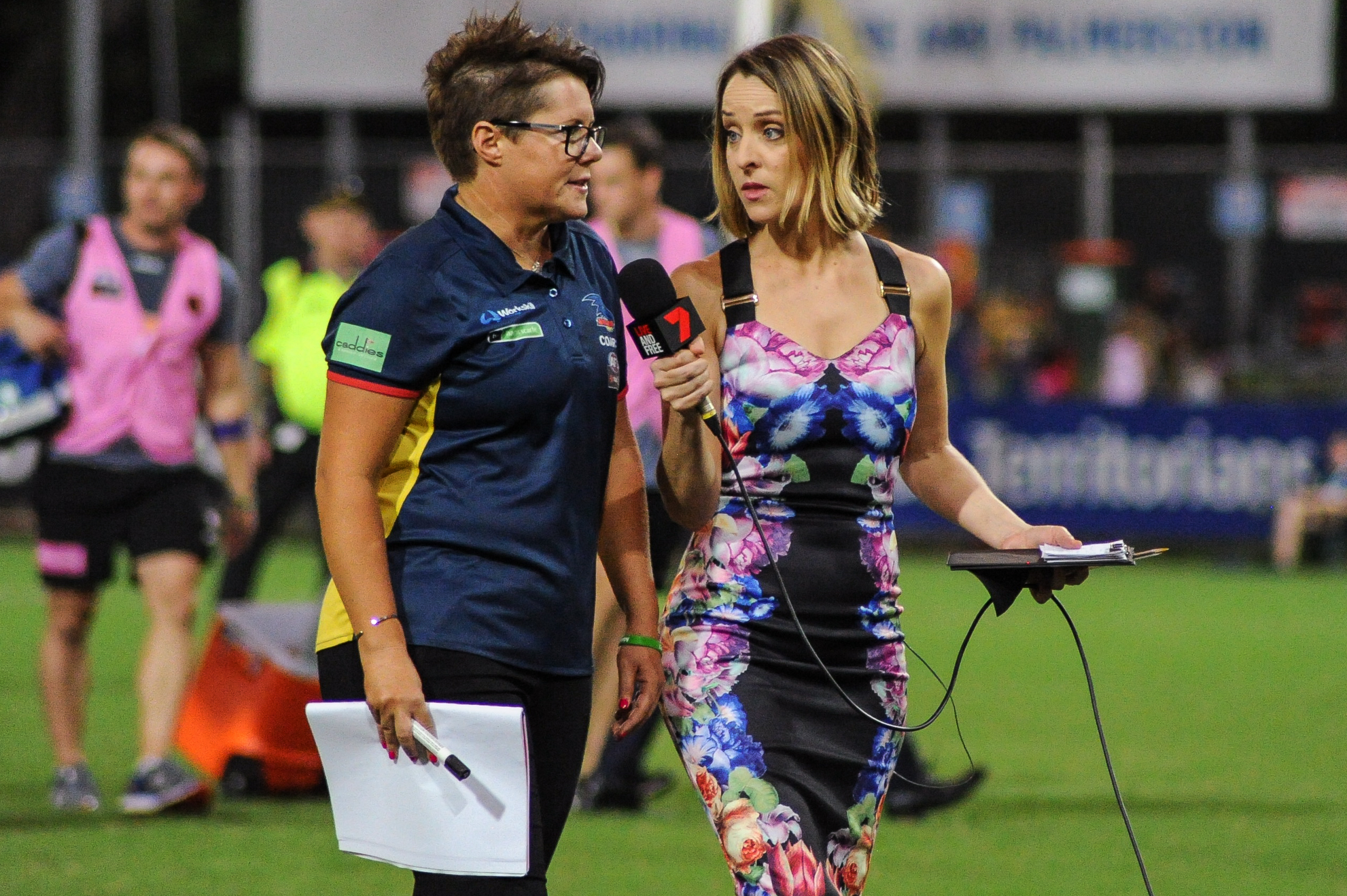
Lane (right) interviewing Bec Goddard during the round 6, 2017 AFLW match between Adelaide and Melbourne.

Lane started out writing for the Carlton Football Club monthly magazine and writing reports for the AFL website.

Lane wrote articles on a range of sports for The Age newspaper until 2020.

== Television ==
Lane was a panellist on Network Ten's Before the Game AFL panel show from 2003 until leaving at the end of the 2012 football season. She also made regular contributions on Melbourne community radio station Triple R.

In 2013, Lane joined the Seven Network for its Saturday night AFL coverage.

Lane was a cast member of the ABC Television documentary series Agony Aunts and The Agony of Life.

== Radio ==
Since 2008, she has been a part of the ABC's Radio AFL coverage, joining Stan Alves and Gerard Whatley in the pre-match discussion on Sunday afternoons.

== Community work ==
Lane sits on the advisory committee of the Melbourne Vixens’ board, has been an ambassador for the Basil Sellers Art Prize and Run Melbourne and has an ongoing ambassadorial role for Breast Cancer Network Australia. She has also been a player in the Community Cup charity.

== Awards ==
- 2007: AFL Players' Association Football Writer of the Year
- 2009: Melbourne Press Club Quill Award for Best Sports Story in any Medium
- 2011: AFL Coaches Association Media Award, in recognition of journalistic excellence
- 2011: Vicsport. Media Award
- 2012: Australian Sports Commission awards: Highly Commended for best coverage of sport by an individual (print)'
