= Strings (conference) =

Physics conference held annually

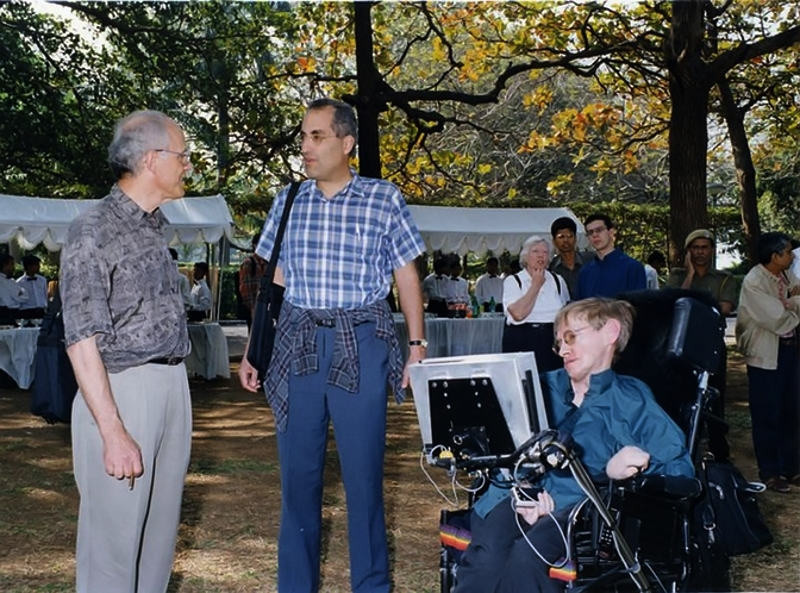
Photo at Strings 2001, from left to right David Gross, Edward Witten, and Stephen Hawking

Strings is a series of international conferences on the topic of string theory and quantum gravity, held annually since 1988. It is a key event for the string theory community. In 2004, it gathered about 400 participants, with several more online. Important topics in string theory have been introduced for the first time during these conferences.

== History ==
The first conference, Strings '88 was held from May 24 to 28, 1988 at the University of Maryland, College Park. It was inspired by the International Workshop on Strings, Composite Structures and Cosmology held in the same venue a year before.

The conferences were not that promising at first and some scientists suggested to stop the annual meetings, however it gained popularity in the 1990s. During Strings '95. Edward Witten discussed the concept of M-theory, sparking the second superstring revolution. In Strings '96, Tom Banks, Willy Fischler, Stephen Shenker, and Leonard Susskind introduced matrix theory; and during Strings '98, Jeffrey A. Harvey composed a song in the tune of "Macarena" to celebrate Juan Maldacena recent discovery of AdS/CFT correspondence.

=== Physics Problems for the Next Millennium ===
During the Strings 2000, participants proposed and selected a "Top Ten Problems in Fundamental Physics for the Next Millennium", similar to the Millennium Prize Problems in mathematics. The problems are:

#	Statement	Proponents
1	Are all the (measurable) dimensionless parameters that characterize the physical universe calculable in principle or are some merely determined by historical or quantum mechanical accident and uncalculable?	David Gross
2	How can quantum gravity help explain the origin of the universe?	Edward Witten
3	What is the lifetime of the proton and how do we understand it?	Steven Gubser
4	Is Nature supersymmetric, and if so, how is supersymmetry broken?	Sergio Ferrara and Gordon L. Kane
5	Why does the universe appear to have one time and three space dimensions?	Shamit Kachru, Sunil Mukhi and Hirosi Ooguri
6	Why does the cosmological constant have the value that it has, is it zero and is it really constant?	Andrew Chambliss and Renata Kallosh
7	What are the fundamental degrees of freedom of M-theory (the theory whose low-energy limit is eleven-dimensional supergravity and which subsumes the five consistent superstring theories) and does the theory describe Nature?	Louise Dolan, Annamaria Sinkovics, and Billy & Linda Rose
8	What is the resolution of the black hole information paradox?	Tibra Ali and Samir D. Mathur
9	What physics explains the enormous disparity between the gravitational scale and the typical mass scale of the elementary particles?	Matt Strassler
10	Can we quantitatively understand quark and gluon confinement in Quantum Chromodynamics and the existence of a mass gap?	Igor Klebanov and Oyvind Tafjord

== List of conferences ==
Here is a list of Strings conferences:

Year	Institution	Location
1988	University of Maryland, College Park	USA
1989	Texas A&M University	USA
1990	Texas A&M University	USA
1991	Stony Brook University	USA
1993	Lawrence Berkeley National Laboratory	USA
1995	University of Southern California	USA
1996	Institute for Theoretical Physics, Santa Barbara	USA
1997	University of Amsterdam	Netherlands
1998	Institute for Theoretical Physics, Santa Barbara	USA
1999	Max Planck Institute, Potsdam	Germany
2000	University of Michigan, Ann Arbor	USA
2001	Tata Institute of Fundamental Research, Mumbai	India
2002	University of Cambridge	United Kingdom
2003	Kyoto University	Japan
2004	Collège de France, Paris	France
2005	University of Toronto	Canada
2006	Beijing	China
2007	Autonomous University of Madrid	Spain
2008	CERN	Switzerland
2009	Pontifical University of Saint Thomas Aquinas	Italy
2010	Texas A&M University	USA
2011	Uppsala University	Sweden
2012	LMU Munich	Germany
2013	Sogang University	Korea
2014	Princeton University and Institute for Advanced Study	USA
2015	International Centre for Theoretical Sciences, Bengaluru	India
2016	Tsinghua University	China
2017	Tel Aviv	Israel
2018	Okinawa Institute of Science and Technology	Japan
2019	Brussels	Belgium
2020	Cape Town (online)	South Africa
2021	ICTP-South American Institute for Fundamental Research (online)	Brazil
2022	Vienna	Austria
2023	Perimeter Institute for Theoretical Physics	Canada
2024	CERN	Switzerland
2025	New York University Abu Dhabi	United Arab Emirates
2026	Shanghai Institute for Mathematics and Interdisciplinary Sciences (SIMIS) & Fudan University	China
