= John Whitten =

Central Intelligence Agency officer

John Moss Whitten (1920–2000) was an American Central Intelligence Agency officer, known under the pseudonym John Scelso. He was awarded the Distinguished Intelligence Medal in 1970.

== Life ==
Whitten was born in 1920 to a US Navy family, and grew up in Annapolis, Maryland. He graduated from the University of Maryland, served in the US Army's Military Intelligence Corps during World War II, and graduated from the University of Virginia in 1947.

Whitten joined the Central Intelligence Agency shortly after its 1947 foundation. He served initially in Washington, D.C., and Vienna, before being assigned to the CIA's Western Hemisphere division in March 1962. In March 1963 he was promoted to chief of CIA covert operations in Mexico and Central America.

In November 1963, following the assassination of John F. Kennedy, Whitten was assigned by Richard Helms to review the CIA's records on Lee Harvey Oswald. Whitten's preliminary finding (that Oswald acted alone) was being delivered by Helms to President Lyndon Johnson as Oswald was being shot by Jack Ruby. With a staff of 30, Whitten continued the investigation. On December 6, Whitten read an FBI report on Oswald showing that the FBI had information about Oswald's links with pro-Castro Cuban groups, which neither the FBI nor Helms had communicated to his investigation. He complained to Helms and James Angleton that this information rendered his initial conclusion "completely irrelevant". Helms took the investigation away from Whitten, and handed it to Angleton.

Whitten was moved in 1965 to "an unimportant job reviewing operations", and retired after receiving the Distinguished Intelligence Medal in 1970. He later became the first American to sing in the Vienna Men's Choral Society. Whitten testified to the Church Committee in 1976, and to the House Select Committee on Assassinations in 1978, both times under his "John Scelso" pseudonym. Whitten told the HSCA that Helms' failure to tell the Warren Commission about the Rolando Cubela plot to assassinate Castro "was a morally highly reprehensible act, which he cannot possibly justify under his oath of office or any other standard of professional service." "John Scelso"'s testimony was declassified by the Assassination Records Review Board in 1996; the Board had intended to declassify that the pseudonym belonged to Whitten, but was eventually persuaded to wait by the CIA.
