= Ted Whitten Jr. =

Australian rules footballer, born 1957

Personal information
- Full name: Edward James Whitten Junior
- Born: 15 March 1957 (age 69)
- Original team: Yarraville Socials
- Height: 178 cm (5 ft 10 in)
- Weight: 76 kg (168 lb)

Playing career^{1}
Years	Club	Games (Goals)
1974–1982	Footscray	144 (133)
- ^{1} Playing statistics correct to the end of 1982.

Edward James Whitten Jr. (born 15 March 1957) is a former Australian rules footballer who played for Footscray in the Victorian Football League (VFL).

As the son of Hall of Fame Legend Ted Whitten Sr., Whitten was in the media spotlight from a very young age and was expected to achieve big things and follow in the footsteps of his father. As a youngster in junior leagues, he was put on a heavy tag, solely due to his name.

Whitten made his debut in 1974 at his father's club, Footscray, but was only recruited after rumours circulated that he was considering joining rival team South Melbourne. In 1974, Whitten made his VFL debut at 17 years of age, and while he could not live up to the stratospheric standards set by one of the greatest footballers of all time in his father, Whitten turned out to be a very good player. He represented Victoria in State of Origin and went on to play 144 games and kick 133 goals between 1974 and 1982. His career was terminated in the 1982 season after he suffered a terrible anterior cruciate ligament injury.

In later years, Whitten helped set up the E.J. Whitten Legends Game, a charity football match which raises funds for prostate cancer research (as his father died from prostate cancer).
