= Witten invariant =

Witten invariant may refer to:

- Gromov–Witten invariant
- Seiberg–Witten invariant
- Quantum invariant
