= Michelle Whitten =

American nonprofit executive

- Born: Michelle Sie; Plainfield, New Jersey, U.S.
- Education: Tufts University (B.A. magna cum laude, Asian Studies); Peking University (IEE Exchange Program, Chinese language, Women's Studies); Harvard University (M.A. Regional Studies East Asia, Graduate School of Arts & Sciences)

Michelle Sie Whitten is an American nonprofit executive, who is the co-founder and executive director of the Global Down Syndrome Foundation in Denver, Colorado.

Whitten started the Global Down Syndrome Foundation along with her parents, Anna and John J. Sie, the founder of Starz, in 2003, shortly after the birth of her daughter, Sophia Kay Whitten, who has Down syndrome.

Since 2005, Whitten has served as the Executive Director of the Anna and John J. Sie Foundation (AJSF), one of the major sources of funding for Down syndrome research and programs, as well as medical care.

== Education ==
Whitten holds an M.A. degree in regional studies (East Asia) and a graduate certificate in business administration, both at Harvard University. She holds a B.A. in Asian studies at Tufts University and she studied Mandarin at Peking University.

== Career ==
She worked in the cable industry from 1993 until 2005. Whitten was President and CEO of Encore International, Inc., then the China arm of Liberty Media Corporation.

== Awards ==
Whitten received the Outstanding Entrepreneur Award and the Women in Cable & Telecommunications Walk of Fame Award as well as the 40 Under 40 Achievement Award.

For her work on behalf of individuals with Down syndrome, Whitten received the 2011 ICON awards for the Be Beautiful Be Yourself Fashion Show, the National Football Foundation Community Outreach Award, the 2010 Rainbow of Hope Award from Keshet of the Rockies, the 2009 Developmental Pathways Frances Owens Family Involvement award, the 2007 National Down Syndrome Congress' Exceptional Meritorious Service Award, and the 2007 Arc Thrift Community Leadership Award.

== Board service ==
Whitten sits on the boards of ARC Thrift of Colorado, Challenge Day Denver, and the Linda Crnic Institute for Down Syndrome.
