= Louis Witten =

American theoretical physicist (b. 1921)

- Born: Louis W. Witten; April 13, 1921 (age 105); Baltimore, Maryland, U.S.
- Education: Johns Hopkins University (BS, PhD); Princeton University; University of Maryland; MIT (postdoctoral research)
- Known for: Electrovacuum solution
- Spouses: Lorraine Wollach (m. 1949; died 1987); Frances DeLange (m. 1992)
- Children: 4, including Edward and Matt
- Relatives: Benjamin Witten (brother); Ilana B. Witten (granddaughter); Daniela Witten (granddaughter); Chiara Nappi (daughter-in-law)
- Scientific career
- Fields: Gravitation
- Workplaces: Princeton University; Martin Marietta Corporation; University of Cincinnati; University of Florida
- Thesis: A Model of an Imperfect Gas
- Doctoral advisor: Theodore H. Berlin

Louis W. Witten (born April 13, 1921) is an American theoretical physicist and the father of the physicist Edward Witten. Witten's research has centered on classical gravitation, including the discovery of certain exact electrovacuum solutions to the Einstein field equation.

== Early life and education ==
Louis W. Witten was born to a Jewish family in Baltimore, Maryland. His parents, Abraham Witten and Bessie Perman, emigrated to the United States from Eastern Europe as teenagers in 1909 and were married in 1916. Witten's older brother Benjamin Witten was a chemist who died in 1976. Louis Witten graduated as a Civil Engineer from Johns Hopkins University in 1941. From 1942 to 1946 he served in the US Army Air Forces as a Radar Weather Officer.

He was a graduate student in physics at The Johns Hopkins University from 1948 to 1951 when he received the PhD degree. His dissertation, in statistical mechanics, was entitled "A Model of an Imperfect Gas". His thesis advisor was Theodore H. Berlin. In 1949 he married Lorraine Wollach of Baltimore. They had four children, Edward, Celia, Matthew, and Jesse. Lorraine died in 1987. In 1992 he married Frances Lydia DeLange.

== Academic career ==
After postdoctoral study at Princeton University, the University of Maryland, and the Lincoln Laboratory of MIT, Witten joined RIAS, the research laboratory of the Martin Marietta Corporation. In 1968 he became a Professor of Physics at the University of Cincinnati where he remained until his retirement in 1991. He is also a courtesy professor at the University of Florida, where he worked for several years while in retirement and continued publishing. Since 1968 he has been a Vice-President and Director of Science Affairs of the Gravity Research Foundation.

He participated in a conference held at the 1957 Chapel Hill Conference "to discuss the role of gravitation in physics".

He edited a book (see citation below) which contains papers by contributors such as ADM (Richard Arnowitt, Stanley Deser and Charles W. Misner), Yvonne Choquet-Bruhat, Jürgen Ehlers and Wolfgang Kundt, Joshua N. Goldberg, and Felix Pirani which are used by researchers after the passage of more than 40 years. His most recent paper was published in August 2025.

== Bibliography ==
- Witten, Louis, ed. (1962). Gravitation: an Introduction to Current Research. New York: John Wiley & Sons. ISBN 978-1114291669.
- Carmeli, Moshe; Fickler, Stuart I.; Witten, Louis (1970). Relativity: Proceedings of the Relativity Conference in the Midwest, held at Cincinnati, Ohio, June 2-6, 1969. Boston, MA: Springer US. ISBN 978-1-4684-0721-1. OCLC 840287501.
- Esposito, F. Paul; Witten, Louis (1977). Asymptotic structure of space-time: [proceedings of a Symposium on Asymptotic Structure of Space-Time (SOASST), held at the University of Cincinnati, Ohio, June 14-18, 1976]. New York: Plenum Press. ISBN 0-306-31022-8. OCLC 2798582.
