= Ted Whitten =

Ted Whitten OAM
- Whitten after a training session in 1954

Personal information
- Full name: Edward James Whitten
- Nicknames: EJ, Mr Football, Teddy
- Born: 27 July 1933; Footscray, Victoria
- Died: 17 August 1995 (aged 62); Altona, Victoria, Australia
- Original team: Braybrook/Collingwood Amateurs
- Height: 184 cm (6 ft 0 in)
- Weight: 89 kg (196 lb)
- Positions: Centre half back, centre half forward

Playing career^{1}
Years	Club	Games (Goals)
1951–1970	Footscray	321 (360)

Representative team honours
Years	Team	Games (Goals)
1956–????	Victoria	29 (4)

Coaching career^{3}
Years	Club	Games (W–L–D)
1957–1971	Footscray	228 (91–137–0)
- ^{1} Playing statistics correct to the end of 1970.^{3} Coaching statistics correct as of 1971.

Career highlights
- Club: VFL Premiership player: (1954); 5× Charles Sutton Medal: (1954, 1957, 1958, 1959, 1961); All-Australian team: 1954; 4× Footscray leading goalkicker: (1961, 1962, 1964, 1968); Footscray captain: (1957–1970); Representative: 3× National Football Carnival championship: 1956, 1958, 1966; 3× All-Australian team: 1956, 1958, 1961; Tassie Medal: 1958; Simpson Medal: 1957; Overall: AFL Team of the Century (captain); Australian Football Hall of Fame, inaugural Legend 1996; Sport Australia Hall of Fame, inaugural Legend

Edward James Whitten Sr. OAM (27 July 1933 – 17 August 1995) was an Australian rules footballer who played for the Footscray Football Club in the Victorian Football League (VFL).

Born and raised into a working-class family in Footscray, Whitten debuted for the Bulldogs in 1951, quickly becoming one of the league's best key-position players, either at centre half-forward or centre half-back. In 1954, he won his first of five club best and fairest awards and earned a spot in the All-Australian team the same year that Footscray won its first VFL/AFL premiership. Appointed as captain-coach in 1957, he developed a successful but controversial game plan centred around the since-outlawed flick pass, and in 1961 led the club to its second grand final appearance, losing to Hawthorn. In 1967, he broke Arthur Olliver's club record of 271 senior games, and retired from playing after establishing a league record of 321 games in 1970.

Whitten was also passionate about interstate football and made 29 appearances for Victoria, and was a leading promoter of State of Origin along with his South Australian sparring partner and friend Neil "Knuckles" Kerley. After retiring, Whitten became a popular football panellist and commentator. He was diagnosed with prostate cancer in 1991, and in 1995, frail and in the final stages of the disease, received a farewell lap of honour during a State of Origin match at the Melbourne Cricket Ground, later ranked as football's most unforgettable moment.

Football writers Russell Holmesby and Jim Main described Whitten as a "prodigious kick, a flawless mark" and as having unequalled "ground and hand skills". Nicknamed "Mr. Football", he was a folk hero in Melbourne's working-class western suburbs, admired not only for his footballing abilities, but his showmanship and larrikin streak. He was inducted into the Sport Australia Hall of Fame in 1985 and elevated to Legend status in 1995. During the AFL's Centenary Year celebrations in 1996, he was one of twelve inaugural Legends inducted into the Australian Football Hall of Fame, and was voted captain and centre half-back in the AFL's Team of the Century. Western Oval, Footscray's home ground, was renamed Whitten Oval in his honour. His enthusiasm for State of Origin is marked by the E. J. Whitten Legends Game, a charity match held annually since 1995.

== Early days ==
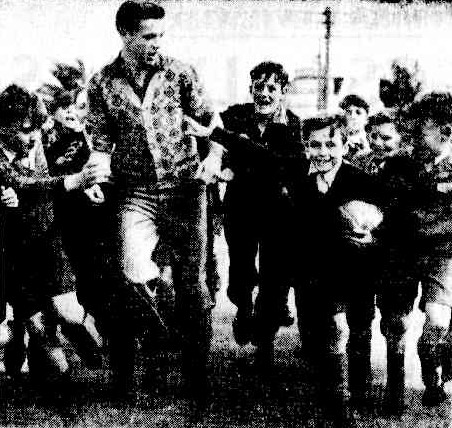
Whitten at age 17 in 1951; an early developer, he was already 6ft tall and 80kg and a fan favourite

Whitten grew up in the western suburbs of Braybrook and Footscray in Melbourne. As a youth, Whitten played for Braybrook on Saturdays and Collingwood Amateurs on Sundays; he was urged by the Collingwood Amateurs coach Charlie Utting (a former Collingwood VFL star) to try out for the Collingwood team but was told later to come back in a few years after building up body strength. Within 12 months he was playing for Footscray, the team he had always supported.

== Football career ==
=== 1951–53: Making a name ===
Whitten made his senior VFL debut in Round 1 of the 1951 VFL season against Richmond at Punt Road Oval and joined a special group of players who scored a goal with his first kick. During the match, Don "Mopsy" Fraser, a notoriously volatile defender for Richmond, knocked Whitten out late in the third quarter. Whitten later said that Fraser did him a favour that day, hardening his attitude and making him realise that League football was a no-nonsense game that only the toughest could succeed at. In Round 5 against St Kilda at the Western Oval, Whitten kicked two goals in a 28-point win, but he suffered a serious injury to his left ankle. Although his injury responded quickly to treatment, Whitten would not play again until Round 8 against Geelong.

In August, Whitten was called up for National Service and sent to Puckapunyal in central Victoria. When Footscray qualified for the finals, club officials tried to obtain special leave for Whitten to play in the First Semi-Final against Essendon. The Army refused to grant permission, but a last-minute intervention by the Prime Minister Robert Menzies allowed Whitten to return to Melbourne for the match. Unfortunately, Footscray lost a hard-fought game by eight points.

=== 1954: Premiership glory ===
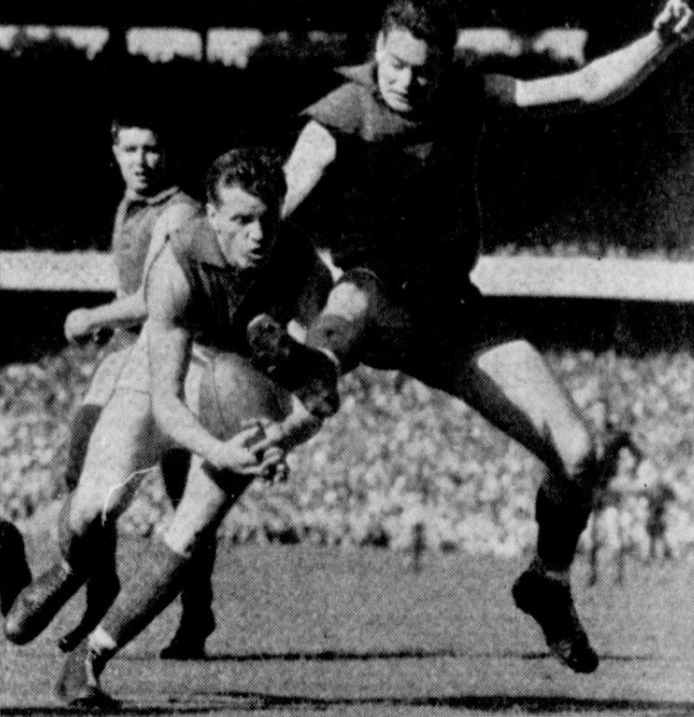
Whitten (left foreground) and Melbourne's Ron Barassi during a 1954 match

After finally breaking their finals hoodoo the previous year, Footscray looked primed and ready to challenge for the VFL Premiership in 1954. He was a key member of Footscray's 1954 VFL Premiership victory, the club's only premiership until 2016.

=== 1955–56: Post-Premiership decline ===
After their Grand Final victory, many expected Footscray to become a powerhouse of Victorian football. However, the club faded away even though Whitten continued to excel.

=== 1957–60: Elevated to captain-coach ===
With superb all-round skills, Whitten was able to kick equally well with his right and left foot. On one occasion, playing against Richmond at Footscray, in the mid-1960s, he broke out of the ruck, to the left, from a centre bounce, ran two paces to balance himself, and kicked a left-foot torpedo kick for a goal. The ball was returned to the centre, bounced, and Whitten burst out of the pack, to the right, ran three paces and kicked a right-foot torpedo kick for a goal.

=== 1961: A second crack at glory ===
Footscray met Hawthorn in the 1961 Grand Final but despite leading at half-time, they were well beaten in the second half. One of the best exponents of the "flick pass", which was eventually banned, Whitten was one of few football players to have the ability to play any position on the field. He was regarded by his contemporaries in the 1950s and 1960s as the greatest naturally talented player of his era;

=== 1962–66: State vs Club ===
Over the course of his playing career, Whitten experienced conflict with the Footscray committee, none more dramatic than at the end of the 1966 VFL season, when he came close to joining Richmond after he was replaced as coach. When Footscray refused the clearance, Whitten threatened to retire, and the matter was only resolved when former teammate Jack Collins took over as club president and convinced Whitten to return and play under his former coach Charlie Sutton.

=== 1967–70: Final years ===
With the demands of coaching and playing beginning to take a toll on his ageing body, Whitten was allowed by the Footscray committee to play four games in 1970 to break Dick Reynolds' long-standing VFL record of 320 games before he retired as a player. His 321st and final game was against Hawthorn at the Western Oval, a game which Footscray won by three points.

In Whitten's last game as a player (and captain-coach), he gave a famous speech at three-quarter time at Western Oval to inspire his troops; the Round 5 game against Hawthorn in 1970 would see Footscray clinch the win by 3 points.

He continued to coach Footscray until the end of the 1971 season.

He coached Williamstown in the 1975 VFA season.

== Off the field ==
As well as being a star player (he appeared for Victoria on 29 occasions), Whitten was a passionate promoter of the game – in particular the State of Origin competition, representing and captaining "The Big V" on many occasions. He was also chairman of selectors for the state team after retiring from playing football. He was a key promotional tool for the series, often featured promoting the Victorian team with his saying "Stick it right up 'em", and had a profound impact on the concept during his time being associated. A notable example of this was before the 1983 game between Victoria and Western Australia, which was for the Australian Football Championships, a new format for the competition, in which Victoria had previously lost to South Australia, and was on verge for the first time in history of losing all of its interstate matches in a year. On the bus ride to the ground, Whitten sternly walked down the aisle and handed out cards which had the Victorian theme song, which hadn't been sung in at least 10 years. And then began to start singing the song, with the players joining in, with soon being sung with feverish enthusiasm, with it being described the players had a tone in there voice of let's get these little bastards. He also inspired many players during his time as a selector, including Paul Roos, Danny Frawley and Jim Stynes.

Whitten once famously said: Years ago you had to crawl over cut glass to get one (i.e. a state guernsey). He worked as a football commentator on television throughout the 1970s and as a radio commentator in the latter part of his life.

Mike Brady wrote a song about him called, "It all sounds like football to me". Ted Whitten is heard answering questions humorously on the song.

== Post-career honours ==
In 1992, Whitten was awarded the Medal of the Order of Australia (OAM) for his services to Australian football.

In 1996, he was among the first batch of inductees to the Australian Football Hall of Fame, and he was one of the twelve players immediately elevated to Legend status. In addition, he was selected as Captain of the AFL Team of the Century. In 2009, The Australian nominated Whitten as one of the 25 greatest footballers never to win a Brownlow medal.

Whitten is one of only three Australian rules footballers recognised as a Legend of Australian Sport in the Sport Australia Hall of Fame, alongside Ron Barassi and Leigh Matthews.

== Death and legacy ==
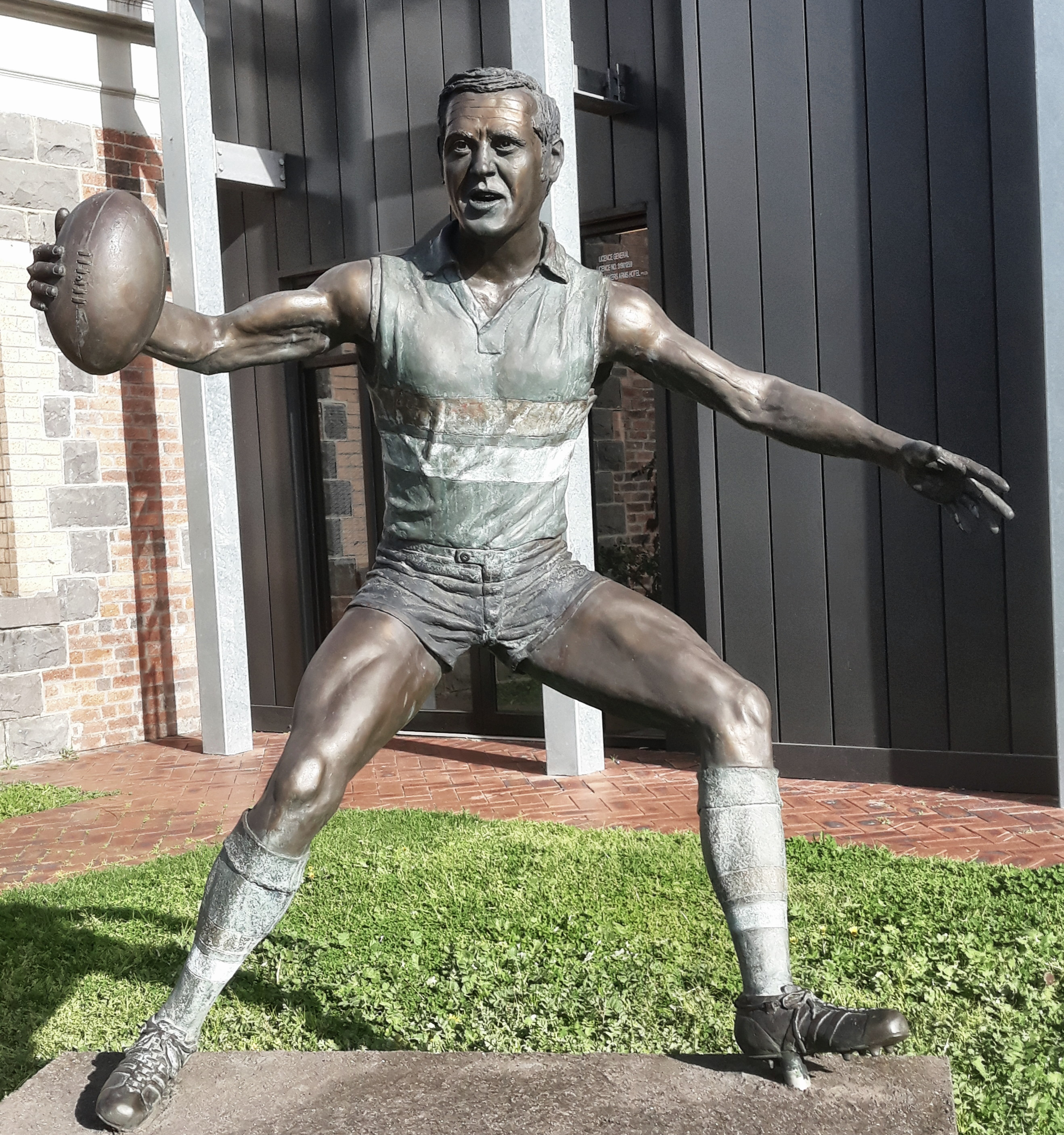
Statue of Whitten outside the Braybrook Hotel, Braybrook

In 1995, Whitten went public with the announcement that he was suffering from prostate cancer. On 17 June he made his final public appearance at the MCG before the State of Origin match between Victoria and South Australia. Suffering from blindness due to a stroke, Whitten was driven in a white convertible for a lap of honour around the MCG, accompanied by his son and three grandchildren while Mariah Carey's song "Hero" was played on the PA system. He received a standing ovation from the crowd. This event was polled as the most memorable Australian rules football moment event by the Melbourne newspaper The Age, and the moment is captured in Jamie Cooper's painting The Game That Made Australia, commissioned by the AFL in 2008 to celebrate the 150th anniversary of the sport.

Whitten died from cancer on 17 August 1995. His death, while expected, nonetheless came as a shock to the football community. News of Whitten's passing was broken live on an episode of The Footy Show. Producer Harvey Silver learned of Whitten's death early in the recording of the episode but did not break the news to host Eddie McGuire and panellists Sam Newman, Wayne Schwass, Garry Lyon and Doug Hawkins until during the final commercial break of the episode. Hawkins in particular, who was a close friend of Whitten, was emotionally distressed upon hearing the news, and he could only manage to say "He was a great man, Teddy." Newman, also a close friend of Whitten, told host Eddie McGuire after the news was broken to the studio audience and viewers: "They say the show must go on, but if we'd known that when we started, the show wouldn't have gone on." The usual studio audience applause that came with the conclusion of the episode was replaced with a silent fade to the Footy Show motif.

Writing for The Age at the end of that year, Les Carlyon reflected on Whitten's impact on communities in the western suburbs of Melbourne:

They loved him out there because he was a larrikin. He made them feel good. He was like them. There was a defensiveness out there—the place stank from the tanneries and abattoirs and maybe other people looked down on us. But we could say to them: "We've got the best player in the league."

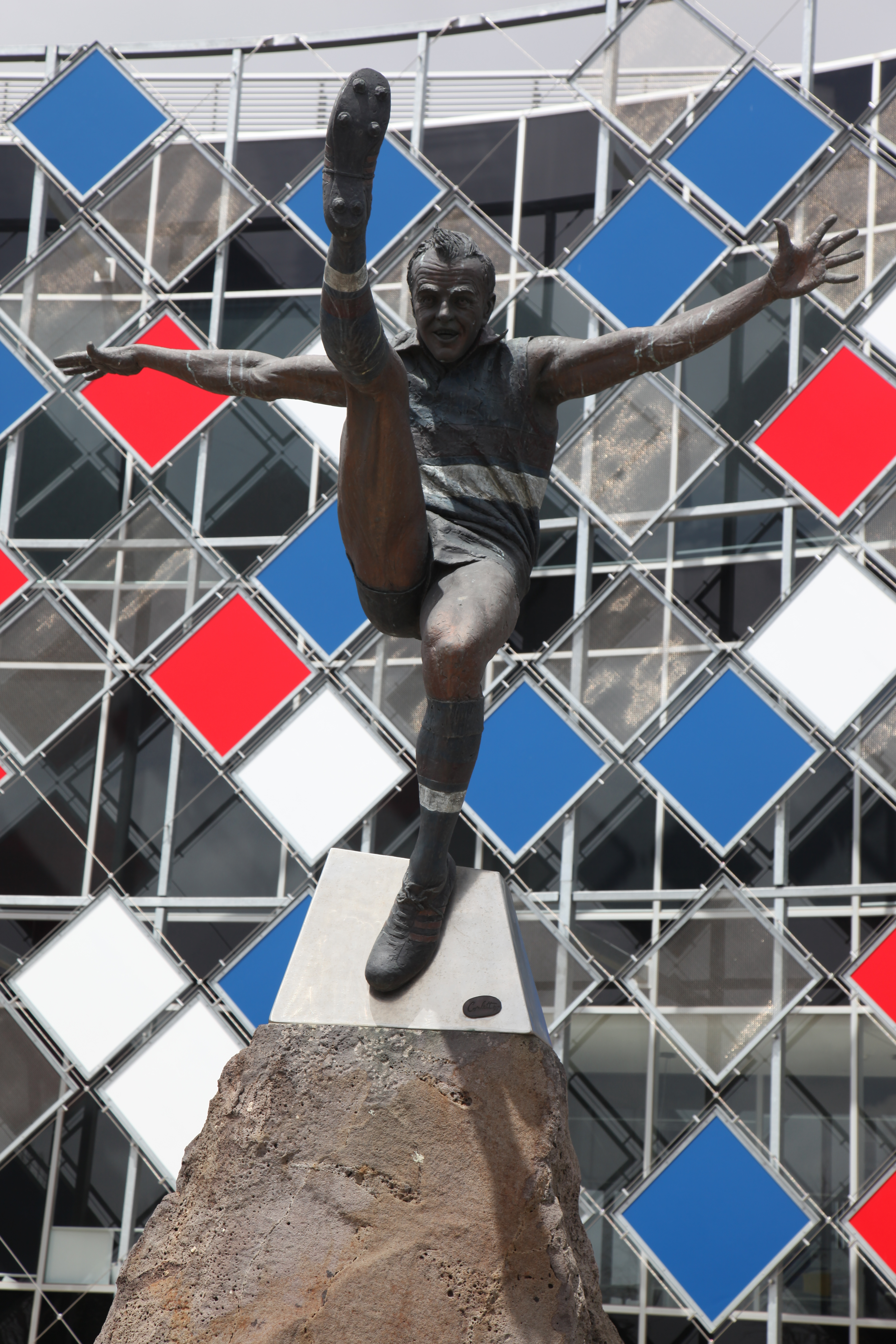
Statue of Whitten outside Whitten Oval, Footscray

Such was Whitten's popularity that he was given a nationally televised state funeral; he had a bridge named for him (EJ Whitten Bridge on the Western Ring Road); and a statue was erected at the Bulldogs' former home ground, Whitten (Western) Oval in Footscray, which was also renamed in his honour.

After Whitten's death, his son, Ted Whitten Jr., instituted the EJ Whitten Legends Game in the memory of his father; the game is a charity match to raise money for prostate cancer research.

Ted Whitten currently rests at Altona Memorial Park in Melbourne's west.

=== Year-by-year statistics ===
Year	Team	No.	Games	Goals	Votes
1951	Footscray	3	15	22	0
1952	Footscray	3	14	19	6
1953	Footscray	3	17	1	3
1954	Footscray	3	20	1	9
1955	Footscray	3	17	0	9
1956	Footscray	3	18	16	9
1957	Footscray	3	14	9	12
1958	Footscray	3	17	24	14
1959	Footscray	3	16	18	14
1960	Footscray	3	16	24	3
1961	Footscray	3	20	42	12
1962	Footscray	3	16	38	2
1963	Footscray	3	18	15	2
1964	Footscray	3	15	24	8
1965	Footscray	3	15	22	1
1966	Footscray	3	14	13	2
1967	Footscray	3	17	19	3
1968	Footscray	3	20	36	3
1969	Footscray	3	18	13	0
1970	Footscray	3	4	4	0
Totals			321	360	112
