= Edward Witten =

American theoretical physicist

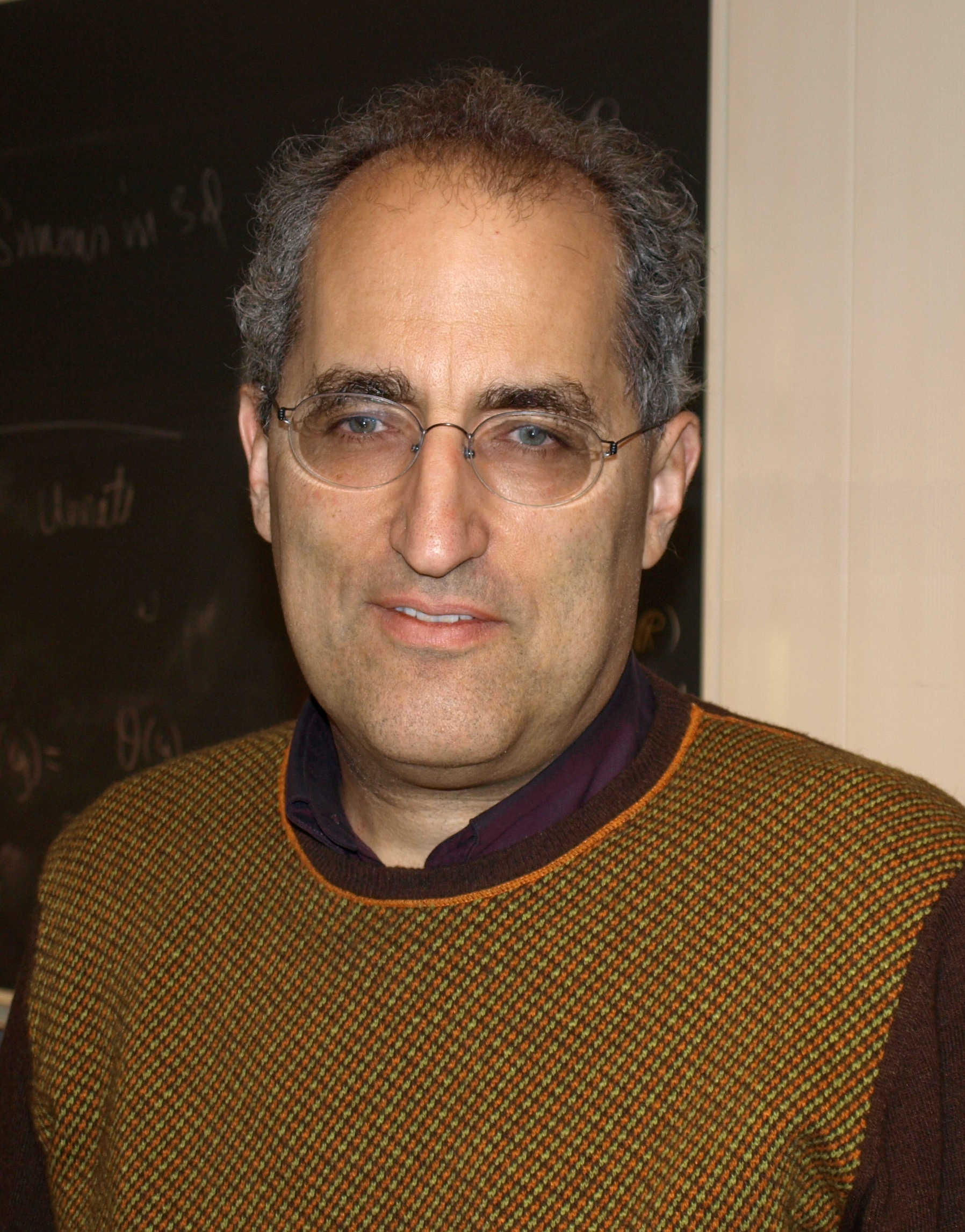
- Witten in 2008
- Born: August 26, 1951 (age 75); Baltimore, Maryland, U.S.
- Education: Brandeis University (BA); Princeton University (MA, PhD)
- Known for: M-theory; Seiberg–Witten theory; Seiberg–Witten invariants; Seiberg–Witten moduli space; Seiberg–Witten flow; Seiberg–Witten map; Kapustin–Witten equations; Vafa–Witten equations; Wess–Zumino–Witten model; Weinberg–Witten theorem; Gromov–Witten invariant; Hořava–Witten domain wall; Vafa–Witten theorem; Witten index; BCFW recursion; Topological quantum field theory (Witten-type TQFTs); Topological string theory; Topological twist; CSW rules; Witten conjecture; Witten zeta function; Hanany–Witten transition; Twistor string theory; Chern–Simons theory; Positive energy theorem; Witten–Veneziano mechanism; Bubble of nothing
- Spouse: Chiara Nappi
- Children: 3, including Ilana B. and Daniela
- Father: Louis Witten
- Relatives: Matt Witten (brother); Benjamin Witten (uncle)
- Awards: MacArthur Fellowship (1982); Albert Einstein Medal (1985); ICTP Dirac Medal (1985); Alan T. Waterman Award (1986); Fields Medal (1990); Dannie Heineman Prize (1998); Nemmers Prize (2000); National Medal of Science (2002); Harvey Prize (2005); Henri Poincaré Prize (2006); Crafoord Prize (2008); Lorentz Medal (2010); Isaac Newton Medal (2010); Breakthrough Prize in; Fundamental Physics (2012); Kyoto Prize (2014); Albert Einstein Award (2016)
- Scientific career
- Fields: Theoretical physics; Mathematical physics; Superstring theory
- Workplaces: Institute for Advanced Study; Harvard University; Oxford University; California Institute of Technology; Princeton University
- Thesis: Some Problems in the Short Distance Analysis of Gauge Theories (1976)
- Doctoral advisor: David Gross; Michael Atiyah
- Other academic advisors: Sidney Coleman
- Doctoral students: Jonathan Bagger (1983); Cumrun Vafa (1985); Xiao-Gang Wen (1987); Dror Bar-Natan (1991); Shamit Kachru (1994); Eva Silverstein (1996); Sergei Gukov (2001)
- Website: ias.edu/sns/witten

Edward Witten (born August 26, 1951) is an American theoretical physicist known for his contributions to string theory, topological quantum field theory, general relativity and various areas of mathematics. He is a professor emeritus in the school of natural sciences at the Institute for Advanced Study in Princeton. Witten is a researcher in string theory, quantum gravity, supersymmetric quantum field theories, and other areas of mathematical physics. Witten's work has also significantly impacted pure mathematics. In 1990, he became the first physicist to be awarded a Fields Medal by the International Mathematical Union, for his mathematical insights in physics, such as his 1981 proof of the positive energy theorem in general relativity, and his interpretation of the Jones invariants of knots as Feynman integrals. He is considered the practical founder of M-theory.

== Early life and education ==
Witten was born on August 26, 1951, in Baltimore, Maryland, to a Jewish family, as the eldest of four children. His brother Matt Witten became a writer, and his brother Jesse Amnon Witten became a law partner in the firm Faegre Drinker Biddle & Reath. Their sister Celia M. Witten earned a Ph.D. in mathematics from Stanford University and then an M.D. from the University of Miami. Edward Witten is the son of Lorraine (born Wollach) Witten and Louis Witten, a theoretical physicist specializing in gravitation and general relativity.

Witten attended the Park School of Baltimore (class of 1968), and received his Bachelor of Arts degree with a major in history and minor in linguistics from Brandeis University in 1971.

He had aspirations in journalism and politics and published articles in both The New Republic and The Nation in the late 1960s. In 1972, he worked for six months on George McGovern's presidential campaign.

Witten attended the University of Michigan for one semester as an economics graduate student before dropping out. He returned to academia, enrolling in applied mathematics at Princeton University in 1973, then shifting departments and receiving a PhD in physics in 1976 and completing a dissertation, "Some problems in the short distance analysis of gauge theories", under the supervision of David Gross. He was a National Radio Astronomy Observatory summer student (1974), held a fellowship at Harvard University (1976–77), visited Oxford University (1977–78), was a junior fellow in the Harvard Society of Fellows (1977–1980), and held a MacArthur Foundation fellowship (1982).

== Research ==
=== Fields medal work ===
Witten was awarded the Fields Medal by the International Mathematical Union in 1990.

In a written address to the ICM, Michael Atiyah said of Witten:

Although he is definitely a physicist (as his list of publications clearly shows) his command of mathematics is rivaled by few mathematicians, and his ability to interpret physical ideas in mathematical form is quite unique. Time and again he has surprised the mathematical community by a brilliant application of physical insight leading to new and deep mathematical theorems ... He has made a profound impact on contemporary mathematics. In his hands physics is once again providing a rich source of inspiration and insight in mathematics.

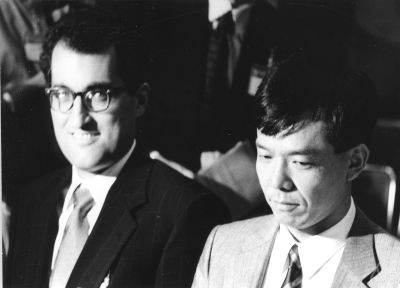
Edward Witten (left) with mathematician Shigefumi Mori, probably at the ICM in 1990, where they received the Fields Medal

As an example of Witten's work in pure mathematics, Atiyah cites his application of techniques from quantum field theory to the mathematical subject of low-dimensional topology. In the late 1980s, Witten coined the term topological quantum field theory for a certain type of physical theory in which the expectation values of observable quantities encode information about the topology of spacetime. In particular, Witten realized that a physical theory now called Chern–Simons theory could provide a framework for understanding the mathematical theory of knots and 3-manifolds. Although Witten's work was based on the mathematically ill-defined notion of a Feynman path integral and therefore not mathematically rigorous, mathematicians were able to systematically develop Witten's ideas, leading to the theory of Reshetikhin–Turaev invariants.

Another result for which Witten was awarded the Fields Medal was his proof in 1981 of the positive energy theorem in general relativity. This theorem asserts that (under appropriate assumptions) the total energy of a gravitating system is always positive and can be zero only if the geometry of spacetime is that of flat Minkowski space. It establishes Minkowski space as a stable ground state of the gravitational field. While the original proof of this result due to Richard Schoen and Shing-Tung Yau used variational methods, Witten's proof used ideas from supergravity theory to simplify the argument.

A third area mentioned in Atiyah's address is Witten's work relating supersymmetry and Morse theory, a branch of mathematics that studies the topology of manifolds using the concept of a differentiable function. Witten's work gave a physical proof of a classical result, the Morse inequalities, by interpreting the theory in terms of supersymmetric quantum mechanics.

=== M-theory ===
By the mid 1990s, physicists working on string theory had developed five different consistent versions of the theory. These versions are known as type I, type IIA, type IIB, and the two flavors of heterotic string theory (SO(32) and E_{8}×E_{8}). The thinking was that of these five candidate theories, only one was the actual correct theory of everything, and that theory was the one whose low-energy limit matched the physics observed in our world today.

Speaking at Strings '95 conference at University of Southern California, Witten made the surprising suggestion that these five string theories were in fact not distinct theories, but different limits of a single theory, which he called M-theory. Witten's proposal was based on the observation that the five string theories can be mapped to one another by certain rules called dualities and are identified by these dualities. It led to a flurry of work now known as the second superstring revolution.

=== Other work ===
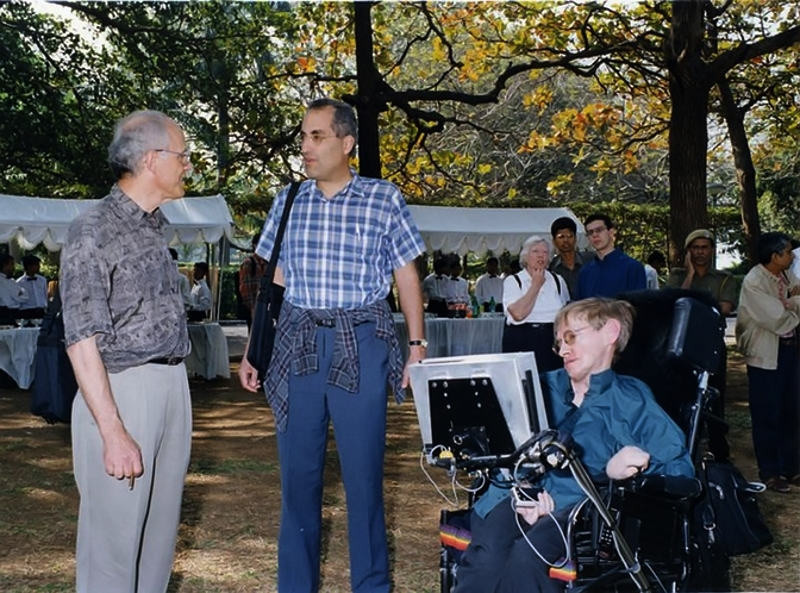
Edward Witten (center) with David Gross and Stephen Hawking at Strings 2001 at TIFR in Mumbai, India

Another of Witten's contributions to physics was to the result of gauge/gravity duality. In 1997, Juan Maldacena formulated a result known as the AdS/CFT correspondence, which establishes a relationship between certain quantum field theories and theories of quantum gravity. Maldacena's discovery has dominated high-energy theoretical physics for the past 15 years because of its applications to theoretical problems in quantum gravity and quantum field theory. Witten's foundational work following Maldacena's result has shed light on this relationship.

In collaboration with Nathan Seiberg, Witten established several powerful results in quantum field theories. In their paper on string theory and noncommutative geometry, Seiberg and Witten studied certain noncommutative quantum field theories that arise as limits of string theory. In another well-known paper, they studied aspects of supersymmetric gauge theory. The latter paper, combined with Witten's earlier work on topological quantum field theory, led to developments in the topology of smooth 4-manifolds, in particular the notion of Seiberg–Witten invariants.

With Anton Kapustin, Witten has made deep mathematical connections between S-duality of gauge theories and the geometric Langlands correspondence. Partly in collaboration with Seiberg, one of his recent interests includes aspects of field theoretical description of topological phases in condensed matter and non-supersymmetric dualities in field theories that, among other things, are of high relevance in condensed matter theory. In 2016, he has also brought tensor models to the relevance of holographic and quantum gravity theories, by using them as a generalization of the Sachdev–Ye–Kitaev model.

Witten has published influential and insightful work in many aspects of quantum field theories and mathematical physics, including the physics and mathematics of anomalies, integrability, dualities, localization, and homologies. Many of his results have deeply influenced areas in theoretical physics (often well beyond the original context of his results), including string theory, quantum gravity and topological condensed matter. In particular, Witten is known for collaborating with Ruth Britto on a method calculating scattering amplitudes known as the BCFW recursion relations.

== Awards and honors ==
Witten has been honored with numerous awards including a MacArthur Grant (1982), the Fields Medal (1990), the Golden Plate Award of the American Academy of Achievement (1997), the Nemmers Prize in Mathematics (2000), the National Medal of Science (2002), Pythagoras Award (2005), the Henri Poincaré Prize (2006), the Crafoord Prize (2008), the Lorentz Medal (2010) the Isaac Newton Medal (2010) and the Breakthrough Prize in Fundamental Physics (2012). Since 1999, he has been a Foreign Member of the Royal Society (London), and in March 2016 was elected an Honorary Fellow of the Royal Society of Edinburgh. Pope Benedict XVI appointed Witten as a member of the Pontifical Academy of Sciences (2006). He also appeared in the list of Time magazine's 100 most influential people of 2004. In 2012, he became a fellow of the American Mathematical Society. Witten was elected as a member of the American Academy of Arts and Sciences in 1984, a member of the National Academy of Sciences in 1988, and a member of the American Philosophical Society in 1993. In May 2022 he was awarded an honorary Doctor of Sciences from the University of Pennsylvania.

In an informal poll at a 1990 cosmology conference, Witten received the largest number of mentions as "the smartest living physicist".

== Personal life ==
Witten has been married to Chiara Nappi, an Italian professor of physics at Princeton University, since 1979. They have two daughters and a son. Their daughter Ilana B. Witten is a neuroscientist at Princeton University, and daughter Daniela Witten is a biostatistician at the University of Washington.

Witten sits on the board of directors of Americans for Peace Now and on the advisory council of J Street. He supports the two-state solution and advocates a boycott of Israeli institutions and economic activity beyond its 1967 borders, though not of Israel itself. Witten lived in Israel for a year in the 1960s.

== Selected publications ==
- Some Problems in the Short Distance Analysis of Gauge Theories. Princeton University, 1976. (Dissertation.)
- Roman Jackiw, David Gross, Sam B. Treiman, Edward Witten, Bruno Zumino. Current Algebra and Anomalies: A Set of Lecture Notes and Papers. World Scientific, 1985.
- Green, M., John H. Schwarz, and E. Witten. Superstring Theory. Vol. 1, Introduction. Cambridge Monographs on Mathematical Physics. Cambridge, UK: Cambridge University Press, 1988. ISBN 978-0-521-35752-4.
- Green, M., John H. Schwarz, and E. Witten. Superstring Theory. Vol. 2, Loop Amplitudes, Anomalies and Phenomenology. Cambridge, UK: Cambridge University Press, 1988. ISBN 978-0-521-35753-1.
- Quantum fields and strings: a course for mathematicians. Vols. 1, 2. Material from the Special Year on Quantum Field Theory held at the Institute for Advanced Study, Princeton, NJ, 1996–1997. Edited by Pierre Deligne, Pavel Etingof, Daniel S. Freed, Lisa C. Jeffrey, David Kazhdan, John W. Morgan, David R. Morrison and Edward Witten. American Mathematical Society, Providence, RI; Institute for Advanced Study (IAS), Princeton, NJ, 1999. Vol. 1: xxii+723 pp.; Vol. 2: pp. i–xxiv and 727–1501. ISBN 0-8218-1198-3, 81–06 (81T30 81Txx).
