= Matt Witten =

American screenwriter

Matthew Witten (born in Baltimore) is an American television writer for House and other shows. He also has written several mystery books, the first of which was Breakfast at Madeline's. His novel The Necklace was published in September, 2021, by Oceanview Publishing.

He is credited as the writer for the Supernatural episodes "No Exit"—centering on the ghost of H. H. Holmes—and "Playthings".

Witten also teaches screenwriting for UCLA Extension Writers' Program.

== Background and education ==
Witten grew up in Cincinnati and graduated from Amherst College. He lives in the Los Angeles area with his wife and two sons. He is the son of Louis Witten and the brother of Edward Witten, both of whom are theoretical physicists.

== Plays ==
- The Deal (1989). The play won a Clauder Playwriting Competition, helping Witten launch his career as a television writer.
- Sacred Journey (2000)

== Mystery novels ==
- Breakfast at Madeline's, a murder mystery set in Saratoga Springs.
- Grand Delusion, a murder mystery set in Saratoga Springs
- Strange Bedfellows
