= Seven Sport =

Sport division of the Seven Network in Australia

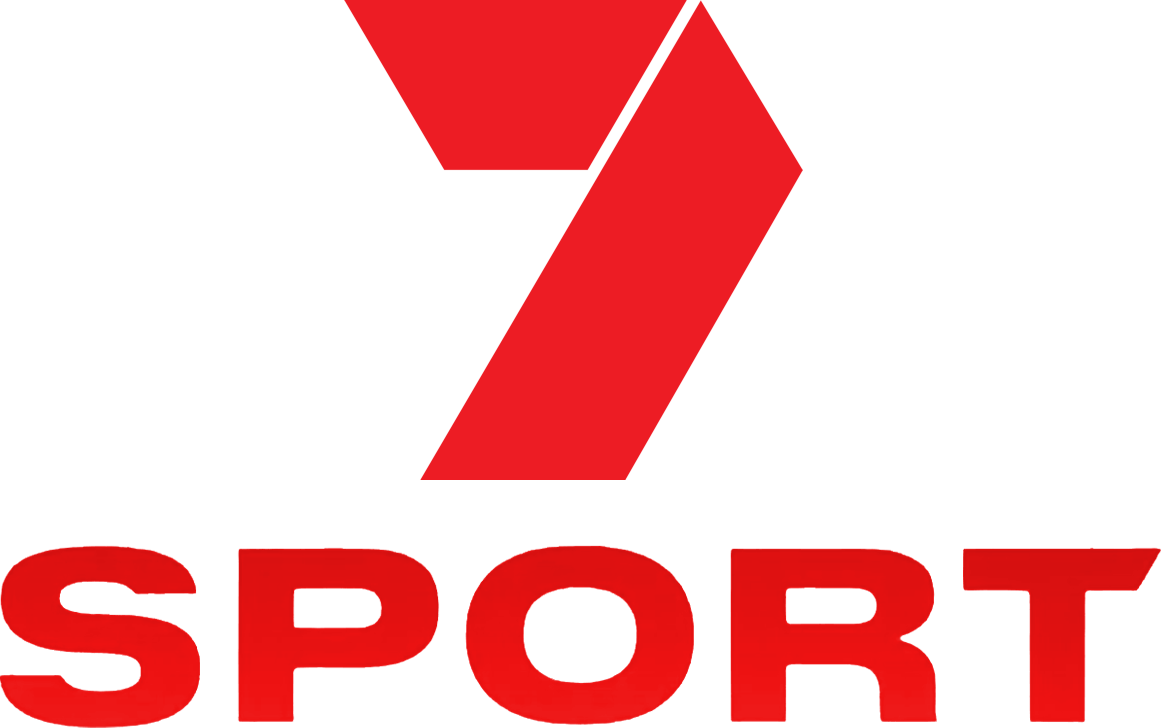
- Logo used from 2020-2021 and used since 2024
- Network: Seven Network
- Launched: 1957
- Country of origin: Australia
- Owner: Seven Media Group
- Headquarters: Docklands, Melbourne, Victoria
- Major broadcasting contracts: AFL; AFLW; NFL; Super Bowl; Commonwealth Games; International Test Cricket; International Women's Cricket; Big Bash League; Women's Big Bash League; Tour Down Under; Supercars Championship; Rugby League World Cup
- Sister network: Seven Network; 7two 7mate 7plus
- Official website: 7plus.com.au/sport

Seven Sport is the brand and production department under which all sporting events on the Australian Seven Network are broadcast. It broadcasts some of Australia's most prominent sporting events, such as the AFL and cricket, as well as horse racing and motor racing.

Seven Sport previously broadcast tennis (headlined by the Australian Open) and the Olympics & Paralympics for the best part of half a century, exclusively since the early 1970s and Moscow 1980 respectively. Seven lost the broadcast rights to both to arch-rival the Nine Network in 2018 (which commenced a year early in 2019) and 2022 respectively (having broadcast London 2012 in the past and re-commenced with Paris 2024). It caused the biggest ever 'shake-up' of Australian television sports broadcasting with widespread media coverage and public discussion at the time.

== History ==
=== Australian rules football ===
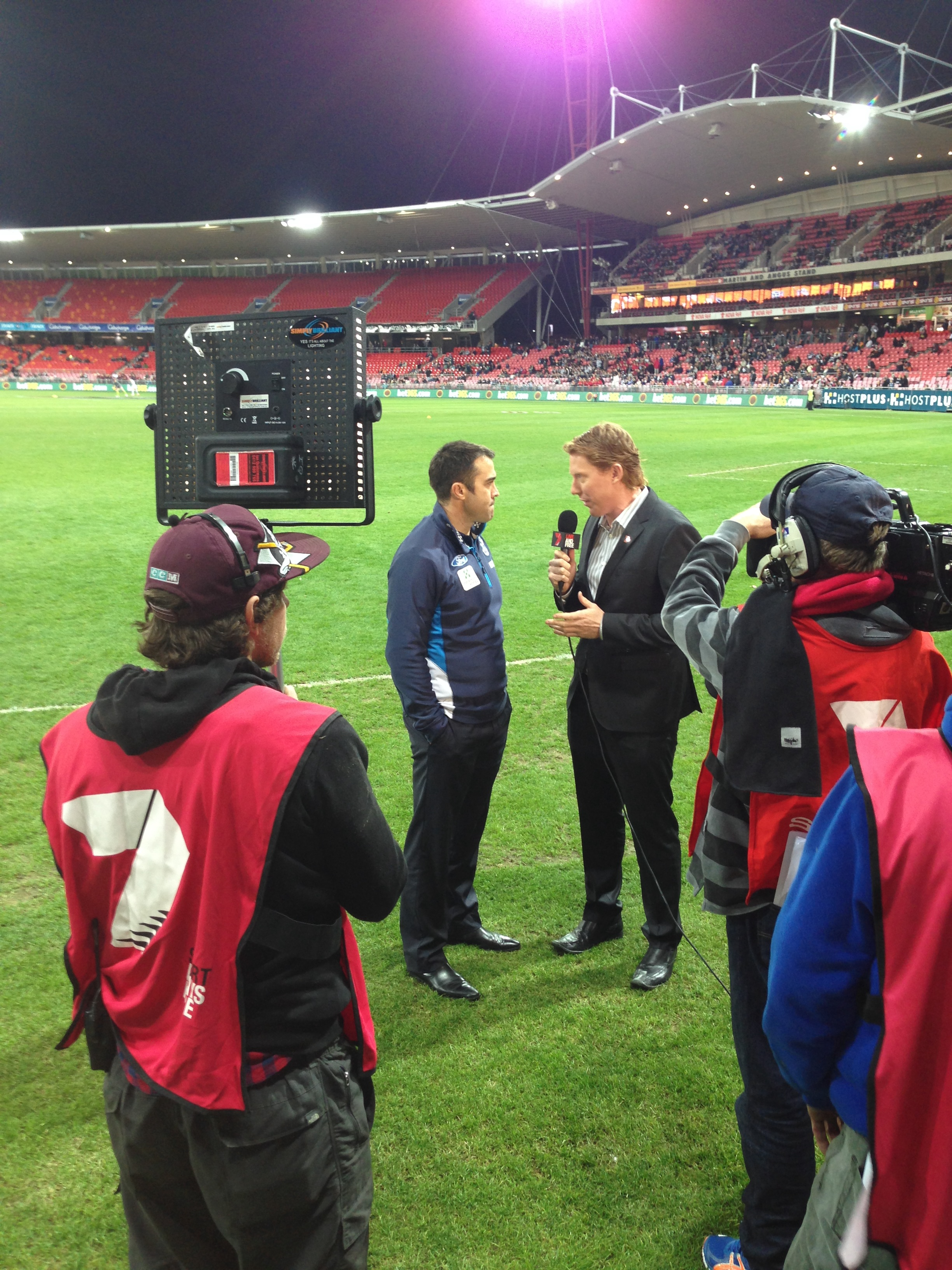
The Seven Sport crew filming a pre-match interview between commentator Cameron Ling and Geelong Cats coach Chris Scott in 2014.

From the first year of television in Australia in 1956 to 2001, Seven was the main broadcaster of the VFL/AFL. From 1974 to 1986 Seven was along with the ABC the main broadcaster of the VFL showing replays and highlights of matches played that Saturday. In 1977 Seven paid the VFL $500,000 to broadcast the Grand Final and a further $500,000 to broadcast the Grand Final Replay also live with the drawn match watch by 1.2 Million viewers at the time the biggest daytime audience in Australia television history. In 1987, after taken over by new ownership from Sydney, HSV-7 lost the VFL rights to Broadcom who on sold the rights in Victoria to the ABC (Broadcom also sold the rights to TVW-7 in Perth) after offering less money compared to the previous year, the rights were regained the next year.

In 2001 the Seven Network announced that after 45 years as the official broadcaster of the VFL/AFL that it would finished its partnership at the end of the season. Nine and Ten entered a joint rights deal with pay TV provider Foxtel to ensure that all eight matches of each round were televised, starting in 2002 and concluding in 2006. At the time and being the only broadcaster, Seven broadcast only one match at a timeslot at a time and showed highlights of other matches that were not broadcast.

On 5 January 2006, Seven regained the rights to the AFL in the following broadcast deal, covering the period between 2007 and 2011 inclusive, in a joint contract with Ten and Foxtel. The cost of the deal was A$780 million, an A$280 million increase on the Nine/Ten/Foxtel 2002-2006 joint broadcast venture. Under the deal, Seven and Ten alternated the Brownlow Medal ceremonies and the AFL Grand Final; Seven televised the Friday night and Sunday afternoon Premiership season matches, while Ten televised the two Saturday matches and Foxtel televising the rest. Both Seven and Ten alternate in show the NAB Cup Grand Final, the Brownlow Medal count (2007, 2009 and 2011 were shown on Seven) and the AFL Grand Final (2008 and both in 2010).

In 2011, it was announced that Seven and Foxtel would share the football broadcast rights from 2012 to 2016, bringing Ten's 10-year run to an end. Under the new deal, Seven would televise four games per week, and Foxtel would simulcast coverage of Seven's games and broadcast the other five weekly games live and exclusive. Seven televised the entire finals series, with Foxtel simulcasting all finals except for the Grand Final, which was televised live and exclusively by Seven. The deal required Seven to televise all but the Saturday afternoon match live into Victoria and Tasmania; all four games were shown live into the northern states on 7mate and games were shown live or on delay into Western Australia (night matches on 7mate, day matches on Seven) and South Australia (all on Seven) depending on Seven's television schedule.

In 2015, Seven commenced broadcasting the WAFL and VFL showing one match a week and all finals from both competitions that did not clash with AFL games in each market, this followed the previous year where SANFL were being broadcast on under the same agreement. For both the WAFL and SANFL, it was the first time since 1987 that each league were broadcast on Seven with all three being on Seven after long association with the ABC ending the previous year.

Also announced in 2015 that Seven would again be the sole free-to-air broadcaster of AFL matches, for the period between 2017 and 2022. Under the deal, Seven no longer televises the Saturday afternoon match into Victoria, however, matches in this timeslot involving interstate teams continue to be televised into their respective markets. Controversially, however, up to three matches involving each of all four of the Western Australia and South Australia clubs (the West Coast Eagles, Fremantle, Adelaide and Port Adelaide) are televised on a significant delay, with the telecast starting after the final siren has gone in real time.

Under a revised deal (post COVID-19) agreement, Channel Seven will show up to five matches per week live on their networks, with Fox Sports broadcasting each and every game on either a Fox Footy or Fox Sports 503. Two matches of both the Eagles and Dockers in WA and one match of both the Crows and Power in SA was shown on a significant delay in the shortened 2020 season. On June 11 the AFL and the Seven Network extended its current agreement until 2022 for an extra two until the end of 2024 with the deal virtually the same as the original one signed prior to 2017.

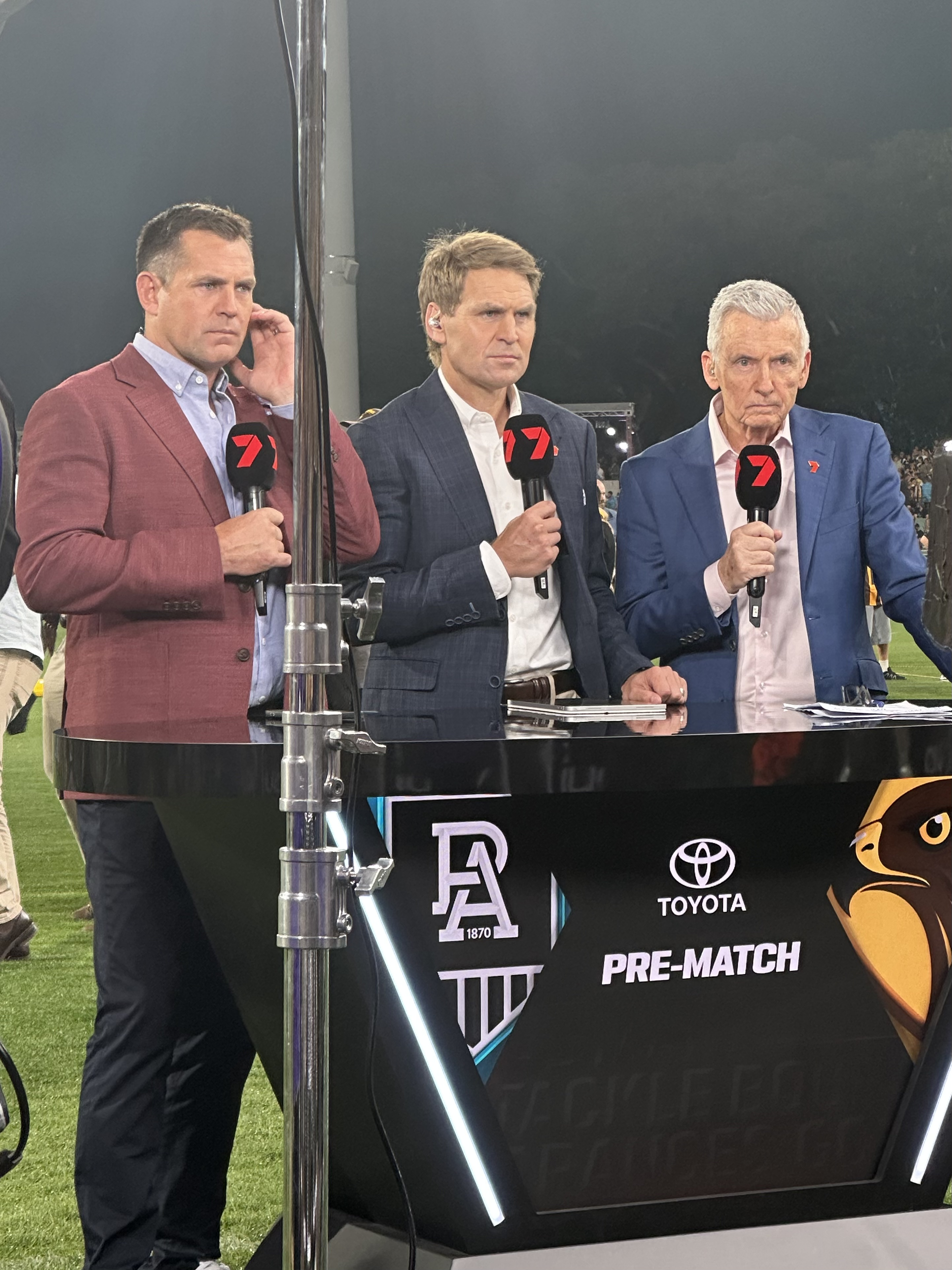
Seven Sport's Luke Hodge, Kane Cornes and Bruce McAvaney during the 2025 AFL season

In 2022, Seven was again announced as the sole free-to-air broadcaster of AFL matches, for the period between 2025 and 2031. Under the deal, Seven will broadcast Thursday Night Football for the first 15 rounds of each season. However, they will not broadcast any Saturday Night matches until the final right rounds of the home-and-away season into Victoria.

This changed however, ahead of the 2025 season started, when it was announced that there would be Thursday night matches in all bar two rounds of the season with Seven to broadcast selected Sunday Night games throughout the season instead of Saturday Nights. This meant that there weren’t any Saturday matches were broadcast into Victoria, Tasmania or the Northern Territory, these arrangements differ outside of those states, where every local team's match will be broadcast on free-to-air, though matches that fell on a Saturday in the first third of the season involving the Western Australia and South Australia clubs along with the New South Wales and Queensland clubs unlike previously, will be on a delay in their local market, similar to the previous deal but on a two-hour delay instead of three, after this stage matches will be shown live. Seven will continue to broadcast weekly Friday Night and Sunday Afternoon matches and for the first were able to live stream matches on their 7plus streaming platform.

In total, Seven produces an average of 3.5 matches a round in the AFL and AFLW seasons and 81 matches in the AFL home-and-away season overall, all AFL and AFLW finals and have exclusive rights to the AFL and AFLW grand finals and the Brownlow Medal count.

=== Olympics ===
The network's coverage of the 2000 Sydney Olympics attracted a TV audience of over 6.5 million Australians for the opening and closing ceremonies. The broadcast also ran on the short-lived C7 Sport subscription channel.

During its time as the broadcaster of the Olympic Games, it has won the Olympic Golden Rings for the Best Television coverage for the best television programme during the 2004 Olympic Games in Athens.

During the 2006 Winter Olympics in Turin, Seven and NBC Universal were the major recipients of the Golden Rings; with Seven taking the Golden Rings for the best Olympic Programme, the Silver Rings for the best Olympic feature (NBC Universal received the Golden Rings), and the Bronze Rings for the Best Sports Coverage (behind SRG Switzerland and YLE Finland).

During Seven's coverage of the XXIX Olympiad, numerous complaints by the general Australian public were made to the Seven Network for several reasons, including the lack of a broadcast of events to which Australia is not competing in, too many advertisements and at inappropriate times during events and poor commentating of events. There has also been media speculation about the editing of Olympic events by Seven; how live sound from events is faded and the commentary sound is the prominent sound feature.

Seven had exclusive Australian free-to-air, pay television, online and mobile telephony broadcast rights to the 2008 Summer Olympics in Beijing. The live telecast of the XXIX Olympiad was shared by both the Seven Network and SBS Television. Seven broadcast the opening and closing ceremonies and mainstream sports including swimming, athletics, rowing, cycling and gymnastics. In stark contrast, SBS TV provided complementary coverage focused on long-form events such as soccer, road cycling, volleyball, and table tennis.

Seven's coverage of the 2008 Summer Olympics was widely criticised by viewers, with many angry at the networks contractual obligation to show AFL football over the Olympics. Viewers also complained that many team sports were delayed, with the absence of Roy and HG and with seemingly large amounts of advertising breaks during live events upsetting some viewers. Despite this, the International Olympic Committee awarded Seven the 'Golden Rings' award for "Best Olympic Programme". The award is given for the best overall Olympic coverage.

From 2016, Seven once again became the home of the Summer Olympic Games, Winter Olympic Games and the Summer Paralympic Games until 2022. In October 2020, the Seven Network announced it would be the home of the 2022 Winter Olympics in Beijing.

=== Commonwealth Games ===
Seven screened the 2002 Commonwealth Games from Manchester and were the official broadcaster of the 2018 Commonwealth Games on home soil on the Gold Coast in April 2018. In July 2022, Seven also broadcast the 2022 Commonwealth Games in Birmingham. In 2025, the Seven Network announced it has signed an exclusive agreement with Commonwealth Sport to become the official Australian broadcast media partner for the 2026 Commonwealth Games, which will take place in Glasgow, Scotland, from 23 July to 2 August, and the 2030 Commonwealth Games, which will take place in Amdavad, India, from 27 September to 6 October.

=== Motor racing ===
From 1963 to 1997, Seven was the home of motor sport in Australia as they broadcast the Australian Touring Car Championship (ATCC) and the Bathurst 1000. Seven were the first broadcasters to use race cam in the 1979 Bathurst 1000, which allowed them to talk to the drivers mid-race.

The Seven commentary team included Evan Green, Will Hagon and Geoff Stone (late 60s to the mid 70s). It included Mike Raymond from 1977 to 1995 and Garry Wilkinson from 1978 to 1996 (V8 1000). Neil Crompton reporting from the pits from around 1985, Mark Oastler (1989–1996), Doug Mulray (1988–1994), Allan Moffat (1985–1996, V8 1000) and as a pit reporter Andy Raymond (early 90s). At the Bathurst 1000, Sandy Roberts or Bruce McAvaney would be the host during the early to mid 1990s.

In 1997, Seven lost the rights to the ATCC to Network Ten, but still broadcast the Australian Super Touring Championship until the series' demise in 2001. In 2003, Seven Sport broadcast the Nations Cup and V8 Utes, before Network Ten broadcast the V8 Utes in 2005 after the collapse of organising body Procar Australia.

From 2007 to 2014, Seven regained the rights to V8 Supercars. The commentary team included Neil Crompton, Mark Skaife and Mark Larkham. From 2015, Seven Sport broadcasts the Bathurst 12 Hour endurance race.

In 2020, Seven regained the TV rights to the Supercars Championship, sharing the rights with Foxtel in a deal worth $200 million for 5 years (2021–2025). The new deal has Seven Sport show seven rounds of the Supercars Championship live and showing highlights of the rounds it is not able to televise.

=== Cricket ===
On 13 April 2018, Cricket Australia announced that the Seven Network had acquired free-to-air media rights to a package of events beginning in the 2018–19 season, under a six-year contract as part of a consortium with Foxtel. Seven would broadcast coverage of all test matches, Women's internationals, 43 Big Bash League matches per-season, and 23 Women's Big Bash League matches per-season. All events would be shared with the newly established Fox Cricket channel. This ended Nine's 45-year run as television rightsholder of international cricket in Australia.

In September 2020, it was reported that Seven was attempting to exit its contract, citing an alleged breach of contract surrounding the scheduling of the 2020–21 season, and that the COVID-19 pandemic in Australia would diminish the quality of the 2020–21 Big Bash League season (violating a contractual obligation for the quality of events carried by Seven to meet that of the previous season). In November 2020, Seven lodged an affidavit in the Federal Court of Australia in Melbourne, seeking access to communications with the Board of Control for Cricket in India (BCCI) in regards to scheduling changes for India's 2020–21 tour of Australia. Seven took issue with the ODIs being moved to the start of the series rather than the test matches (which will be the final event of the series) as they would be exclusive to Fox Cricket, and the final test would overlap the end of the holiday season, reducing potential viewership. Seven West Media CEO James Warburton argued that "there aren't many sports that would launch their season behind a paywall", and that the broadcaster wanted to be "fairly compensated for the value reduction caused by the changes to the schedule and other changes."

Despite its previous threats of legal action, it was announced on 3 January 2023 that had the Seven Network with Foxtel had signed a seven-year contract from the 2024–25 to 2030–31 Australian cricket seasons. Under the deal Seven continued to broadcast every home men’s test match and home women's international, while the number of Big Bash League match was reduced with Seven showing 33 of the 40 regular season matches and every final and at least 23 matches in the Women's Big Bash League season and every final. Legal proceedings that Seven had subsequently was dropped.

Seven Network broadcast the 2023 ICC World Test Championship Final as part of the deal with the ICC. IN 2025, Seven secured the right to broadcast the 2025 Australian Test tour of Sri Lanka.

=== Rugby League ===
In 2016, the Seven Network won the broadcasting rights deal to be the main broadcaster of the 2017 Rugby League World Cup in Australia, beating the other regular rugby league broadcasting channels of Fox League and the Nine Network to secure the deal. In October 2025, it was announced Seven had secured the 2026 Rugby League World Cup and re-establish itself as the home of global rugby league action, uniting fans from across the nation. Rugby League will make its comeback to the Seven Network for the first time since 2017, with the broadcaster securing exclusive Australian rights to air the Rugby League World Cup 2026 (RLWC2026) live and free on Seven and 7plus Sport.

== Theme ==
Seven Sport has used "Fanfare for the Common Man" by Emerson, Lake & Palmer as its theme since 1989. During the 1980s and early 1990s, Seven used the music piece for Sporting events such as: AFL, Australian Open and Australian Touring Car Championship. Up until 2011, an abridged version of the opening fanfare was used. The music piece returned for introductions of the networks sporting coverage since 2018 AFL Grand Final with a version of the Fanfare for the Common Man being used for all sporting coverage including AFL, Cricket, Horse Racing and Motorsport.

== Events ==
Seven Sport holds broadcast rights to the following events:

=== Current ===
Sport	Event	Broadcast partner(s)	Date	Notes
American football	National Football League	ESPN	2014–present	3 games a round shown live on 7mate and 7plus every Monday morning and Friday afternoon. Most playoff and championship matches shown live.
American football	Super Bowl	ESPN	2015–present	Live on 7 or 7mate and 7plus.
Australian rules football	Australian Football League	ABC Sport (1957–1986), Sports AFL (1995–1999), C7 Sport (1999–2001), Network Ten (2007–2011), Fox Sports (2007–2011), Fox Footy (2012–present)	1957–1986, 1988–2001, 2007–present	Average of 3.5 live matches per Round and 81 matches overall shown on 7 or 7mate and 7plus. Average of 1 Thursday Night, 1 Friday Night and 1 Sunday Afternoon match most Rounds and all Monday and marquee matches shown live. Matches involving QLD, NSW, SA and WA teams shown into those states respected live or on a two hour delay. All finals shown Live including Grand Final which is shown exclusively live.
Australian rules football	AFL Women's	Fox Footy	2017–present	Average of 2.5 live matches per Round and around 40 matches overall on 7 or 7mate and 7plus. Matches involving QLD, NSW, SA and WA teams shown into those states shown live. All finals including Grand Final shown Live.
Australian rules football	Gather Round		2023–present	
Australian rules football	E. J. Whitten Legends Game		2016–2019, 2025–present	
Australian rules football	South Australian National Football League		1965–1987, 2014–present	1 live match in Adelaide per Round. All finals including the grand final shown live.
Australian rules football	West Australian Football League		1960's–1987, 2015–present	1 live match in Perth per Round. Most finals and the Grand Final shown live.
Athletics	Australian Track and Field Championships		2024–present	Coverage on Saturdays live on 7 or 7mate and 7plus.
Commonwealth Games	Manchester 2002, Gold Coast 2018, Birmingham 2022, Glasgow 2026, Amdavad 2030	7plus (2018, 2022, 2026, 2030)	2002, 2018, 2022, 2026, 2030	
Cricket	Men's Test Matches in Australia	Fox Cricket	2018–present	Every Test Match live on 7 or 7mate and 7plus.
Cricket	Women's Test Matches in Australia	Fox Cricket	2018–present	Every Match live on 7 or 7mate and 7plus.
Cricket	Women's One-day International Matches in Australia	Fox Cricket	2018–present	Every Match live on 7 or 7mate 7plus.
Cricket	Women's Twenty20 International Matches in Australia	Fox Cricket	2018–present	Every Match live on 7 or 7mate and 7plus.
Cricket	ICC World Test Championship		2023–present	Live on 7 and 7plus
Cricket	Big Bash League	Fox Cricket	2018–present	30 of 40 regular season matches live on 7 or 7mate and 7plus. All finals including the grand final shown live.
Cricket	Women's Big Bash League	Fox Cricket	2018–present	20 of 40 regular season matches shown live on 7 or 7mate and 7plus. All finals including the grand final shown live.
Cricket	Major League Cricket		2025–present	Live on 7plus and final only on 7mate
Cycling	Tour Down Under		2019–present	
Field hockey	Hockey One		2023–present	live on 7plus
Field hockey	Hockeyroos Matches		2023–present	live on 7plus
Field hockey	Kookaburras Matches		2023–present	live on 7plus
Field hockey	Men's Oceania Cup		2023–present	live on 7plus
Field hockey	Women's Oceania Cup		2023–present	Live on 7plus
Golf	LIV Golf		2023–present	Live on 7mate and 7plus
Horse Racing	Autumn Racing Carnival	Sky Racing	2013–present	Live on 7 or 7two and 7plus
Mixed martial arts	Bellator MMA	UFC TV	2025–present	Live coverage of every fight on 7plus
Motor racing	Australian Off Road Championship		2018–present	Live on 7mate
Motor racing	Australian Rally Championship		2022–present	Live on 7mate
Motor racing	Bathurst 1000	Fox Sports (2021–present)	1963–1999, 2007–2014, 2021–present	Live on 7, 7mate and 7plus
Motor racing	Supercars Championship formerly Australian Touring Car Championship	Speed (Highlights, 2014); Fox Sports (2021–present)	1963–1996, 2007–2014, 2021–present	Live on 7, 7mate and 7plus
Motor racing	SuperUtes Series	Speed (Highlights, 2014); Fox Sports (2021–present)	2003–2004, 2007–2014, 2021–present	Live on 7mate
Motor racing	TCR Australia Touring Car Series		2020–present	Live on 7mate
Motor racing	World Rally Championship		2020–present	Live on 7mate
Rugby League	Rugby League World Cup	7plus (2026)	2013, 2017, 2026	Live on 7, 7mate & 7plus
Rugby league	Women's Rugby League World Cup	7plus (2026)	2017, 2026	Live on 7, 7mate & 7plus
Rugby league	Wheelchair Rugby League World Cup	7plus (2026)	2026	Live on 7, 7mate & 7plus
Surfing	World Surf League		2020–present	Live on 7mate

=== Past ===
Sport	Event	Broadcast partners(s)	Dates
Summer Olympics	Melbourne 1956, Munich 1972, Montreal 1976, Moscow 1980, Barcelona 1992, Atlanta 1996, Sydney 2000, Athens 2004, Beijing 2008, Rio 2016, Tokyo 2020	ABC (1956, 1972, 1976), Nine Network (1956, 1972, 1976), C7 Sport (1996, 2000), Foxtel (2004, 2008), SBS (2004, 2008)	1956, 1972, 1976, 1980, 1992, 1996, 2000, 2004, 2008, 2016, 2021
Winter Olympics	Lake Placid 1980, Nagano 1998, Salt Lake City 2002, Turin 2006, Pyeongchang 2018, Beijing 2022	Foxtel (2006)	1980, 1998, 2002, 2006, 2018, 2022
Summer Paralympic Games	Rio 2016, Tokyo 2020	7plus	2016, 2021
Winter Paralympic Games	Beijing 2022	7plus	2022
Australian rules football	International Rules Series		1998–2000, 2008-2010, 2013–2015, 2017-2019
Australian rules football	Victorian Football League		2015–2025
Basketball	NCAA College Basketball		1980s–1990s
Basketball	National Basketball League	ABT (1988–1991)	1988–1991
Cricket	The Ashes in England	C7 Sport (2001)	2001, 2005
Cricket	Australia Tour of Sri Lanka		2025
Cricket	1996/97 Australian tour of South Africa (Test and ODI matches)		1996–1997
Gaelic Football	Irish Football League		2014-2016
Gaelic Football	All-Ireland Senior Football Championship		2014-2016
Golf	Australian Masters		2013–2015
Golf	Australian Open	Fox Sports	1989–2008, 2012–2019
Golf	Australian PGA Championship	Fox Sports	2014–2019
Golf	Perth International		2013–2015
Golf	U.S. Masters		2014–2017
Horse Racing	Melbourne Cup Carnival	Sky Racing	2002–2018
Horse Racing	Melbourne Spring Racing Carnival	Sky Racing	2002–2006, 2014–2020
Hurling	All-Ireland Senior Hurling Championship		2014
Mixed martial arts	One Championship	UFC TV	2023–2025
Motor Racing	Australian Off Road Championship		2018
Motor Racing	Australian Rally Championship		2018–2019
Motor racing	Bathurst 12 Hour	Fox Sports (2020–25)	2015–2020, 2022–25
Motor Racing	IndyCar Series		2008
Motor Racing	NASCAR		1980s–1990s
Motor racing	TCR Australia Touring Car Series		2020
Motor Racing	World Rally Championship		2018–2019
Rugby League	New South Wales Rugby League	ABC (1971–1982), Nine Network (1971–1972) 0-10 Network (1973–1979), Network Ten (1980–1982)	1971–1982
Rugby League	State of Origin		1980–1982
Rugby League	The Kangaroos		1978, 1981–1982, 1991–1993
Rugby League	The Ashes		1978, 1982, 1992
Rugby Union	Super 12	Fox Sports	1996–2003
Rugby Union	Bledisloe Cup	Fox Sports	1996–2010
Rugby Union	British and Irish Lions	Fox Sports	2001
Rugby Union	Tri Nations	Fox Sports	1996–2010
Rugby Union	Wallabies Rugby Internationals	Fox Sports	1996–2010
Rugby Union	Wallabies Spring Tour	Fox Sports	1996–2010
Rugby Union	1999 Rugby World Cup, 2003 Rugby World Cup	Fox Sports (2003)	1999, 2003
Rugby Union	World Series Rugby	Fox Sports (2018)	2018
Rugby Union	Shute Shield		2015–2020
Soccer	A-League All Stars Game		2013, 2014
Soccer	Melbourne Victory v Liverpool Match		2013
Soccer	Adelaide United v Villarreal Match		2015
Soccer	Matilda's Olympic Qualifying Tournament		2016
Soccer	Sydney FC v Tottenham FC Match		2015
Soccer	Perth Glory v Manchester United Match		2019
Soccer	Manchester United v Leeds United Match		2019
Soccer	National Soccer League	C7 Sport (1998–2000), ABC (2001), SBS (2002–2004)	1998–2004
Soccer	FIFA World Cup	ABC	1974
Soccer	FIFA Women's World Cup	Optus Sport	2023
Swimming	Australian Swimming Championships		2016–2020
Swimming	FINA World Aquatics Championships		2015, 2017
Swimming	Pan Pacific Swimming Championships		2016–2020
Tennis	Australian Open	Fox Sports (2003–2009)	1973–2018
Tennis	Davis Cup	Fox Sports (2001–2016), beIN Sports (2017–2018)	1973–2018
Tennis	Fed Cup	Fox Sports (2015–2016), beIN Sports (2017–2018)	2015–2018
Tennis	Hopman Cup		1989–1994, 2014–2018
Tennis	Kooyong Classic		1988–2018
Tennis	Sydney International		2000s–2018
Tennis	Brisbane International		2009–2018
Tennis	French Open		2002–2005
Tennis	Melbourne Indoor		1980–1985
Tennis	Wimbledon		2011–2020
Tennis	US Open		2004–2007
Yachting	Sydney to Hobart Yacht Race		2005–2023

== Programs ==
Seven Sport has presented the following recurring programmes:

Current

Sport (event)	Program	Date
Australian rules football (AFL)	The Front Bar	2016–present
Australian rules football (AFL)	Friday Night Countdown	2015–present
Australian rules football (AFL)	Armchair Experts	2018–present
Australian rules football (AFL)	The Crows Show	2015–present
Australian rules football (AFL)	FootyPlus	2018–present
Australian rules football (AFL)	The Game	2018–present
Cricket	The Grade Cricketer	2019–present (7mate)
Cricket	The Spin	2021–present (7plus)
American football (NFL)	Armchair Experts (NFL Edition)	2020–present
Australian rules football (AFL)	Sunday Footy Fest	2021–present
Australian rules football (AFL)	Heater and Daisy Show	2021–present (7plus)
Motorsport	Supercars 101	2021–present (7plus)
Motorsport	7th Gear	2021–present (7mate)
Australian rules football (AFL)	The Agenda Setters: AFL	2025–present (7/7mate)
Rugby league (NRL)	The Agenda Setters: NRL	2026–present (7/7mate)

Past

Sport (event)	Program	Date
All	World of Sport	1959–1987
All	Sportsworld	1988–2006
All	Santo, Sam and Ed's Sports Fever!	2012
All	Road to Rio	2016
Australian rules football (AFL)	The Bounce	2010
Australian rules football (AFL)	Rex's Footy Panel	1994–2003
Australian rules football (AFL)	The Club	2002
Motor Racing (V8 Supercars)	V8Xtra	2007–2014
Motor Racing (V8 Supercars)	Friday Night Live	2012–2014
Motor Racing (Historical)	Shannons Legends of Motorsport	2014–2015
Rugby league (NRL)	The Matty Johns Show	2010
Australian rules football (AFL)	AFL Game Day	2008–2020
Australian rules football (AFL)	Talking Footy	1994–2004; 2013–2020, 2023–2024
Australian rules football (AFL)	The Kick	2017–2019
Australian rules football (AFL)	Four Quarters	2017–2019
Australian rules football (AFL)	Sunday Soapbox	2016–2019

== Staff and commentators ==
The following network personalities are seen across multiple Seven Sport events:

- Bruce McAvaney (chief commentator, all sports; member since 1989)
- Johanna Griggs (host, Olympics, Commonwealth Games and Australian Open; member since 1994)
- Hamish McLachlan (host, Olympics, Commonwealth Games, Australian Open; presenter AFL, Melbourne Cup, cricket; member since 2008)
- Jason Richardson (host, cricket and Australian Open; presenter Olympics, Commonwealth Games and Melbourne Cup; member since 2014)
- Mel McLaughlin (host, Olympics, cricket and Australian Open; presenter Commonwealth Games, Melbourne Cup; member since 2016)
- James Brayshaw (commentator, AFL, Cricket; member since 2018)

=== Olympic Games ===
==== Tokyo 2020 ====
- Bruce McAvaney (Athletics/Ceremonies Commentator)
- Hamish McLachlan (Prime Time Co-Host)
- Abbey Gelmi (Prime Time Co-Host)
- Matt Shirvington (Afternoons Co-Host)
- Edwina Bartholomew (Afternoons Co-Host)
- Luke Darcy (Mornings Co-Host)
- Johanna Griggs (Mornings Co-Host)
- Andy Maher (Late Nights Co-Host)
- Lisa Sthalekar (Late Nights Co-Host)
- Mel McLaughlin (Tokyo Reporter)
- Annabelle Williams (Paralympics Co-Host)
- Kurt Fearnley (Paralympics Co-Host)
- Mark Beretta (Tokyo Reporter)
- Jason Richardson (Athletics Trackside)
- Nathan Templeton (Swimming Poolside)
- Tamsyn Lewis (Athletics Commentary)
- Dave Culbert (Athletics Commentary)
- Basil Zempilas (Swimming Commentary)
- Giaan Rooney (Swimming Commentary)
- Ian Thorpe (Swimming Commentary)
- Candice Warner (Marathon Swimming/Triathlon Commentary)
- Andrew Gaze (Basketball Commentary)
- John Casey (Men's Basketball Commentary)
- Rachael Sporn (Women's Basketball Commentary)
- Alister Nicholson (Hockey Commentary)
- Georgie Parker (Hockey Commentary)
- Scott McGrory (Cycling Commentary)
- Anna Meares (Cycling Commentary)
- Nick Green (Rowing/Canoeing Commentary)
- Kerri Pottharst (Beach Volleyball Commentary)
- Matt Hill (Rowing, Canoeing, Kayaking Commentary)
- Russell Mark (Shooting Commentary)
- Debbie Watson (Water Polo Commentary)
- Greg Clark (Rugby Sevens Commentary)
- Brenton Speed (Football, Beach Volleyball, Tennis, Basketball Commentary)
- Chris Stubbs (7mate Host)
- Trent Copeland (7mate Host)
- Emma Freedman (7mate Host)

==== Rio 2016 ====
Most Seven programs, except Sunrise and The Chase Australia, went on hiatus during Seven's broadcast of the Olympic Games.

- Bruce McAvaney (Host/Main Commentator)
- Hamish McLachlan (Host)
- Mel McLaughlin (Host)
- Bill McDonald (Mixed Zone Reporter, News Host & Table Tennis Commentator)
- Jim Wilson (Host)
- Kylie Gillies (Host)
- Todd Woodbridge (Host)
- David Koch (Olympic Sunrise Host)
- Natalie Barr (Olympic Sunrise Host)
- Johanna Griggs (Host/Reporter/Ceremonies Commentator)
- Rachael Finch (Reporter)
- Edwina Bartholomew (Olympic Sunrise Reporter)
- Mark Braybrook (Commentator)
- Neil Kearney (Reporter)
- Ryan Phelan (Olympic Update Host)
- Amanda Abate (Olympic Update Host)
- Steve Hooker (Athletics Commentator)
- Tamsyn Lewis (Athletics Commentator)
- Dave Culbert (Athletics/Canoeing/Kayaking Commentator)
- Pat Welsh (Trackside Athletics Commentator)
- Basil Zempilas (Swimming Commentator)
- Giaan Rooney (Swimming Commentator)
- Nathan Templeton (Poolside Swimming Commentator)
- Phil Liggett (Cycling Commentator)
- Scott McGrory (Cycling Commentator)
- Kate Bates (Cycling Commentator)
- Drew Ginn (Rowing/Canoeing/Kayaking Commentator)
- Brenton Speed (Rowing Commentator)
- John Casey (Basketball Commentator)
- Andrew Gaze (Basketball Commentator)
- Lauren Jackson (Basketball Commentator)
- Michael McCann (Diving Commentator)
- Loudy Wiggins (Diving Commentator)
- David Christison (Hockey Commentator)
- Rechelle Hawkes (Hockey Commentator)
- Vicki Roycroft (Equestrian Commentator)
- Martin Gostelow (Equestrian Commentator)
- Geoff Masters (Tennis Commentator)
- Debbie Watson (Water Polo Commentator)
- Bill Woods (Water Polo Commentator)
- Mark Readings (7TWO & 7mate Host/Commentator)
- Jason Richardson (7TWO & 7mate Host)
- Aaron Noonan (7TWO & 7mate Host)
- Michael Zappone (7TWO & 7mate Host/Football Commentator)

==== Beijing 2008 ====
- Bruce McAvaney (Ceremonies/Athletics/Swimming))
- Andrew Daddo (Host)
- Kylie Gillies (Host)
- Johanna Griggs (Host)
- Sandy Roberts (Host/Ceremonies)
- Matthew White (Host)
- Ric Birch (Ceremonies)
- Sonia Kruger (Ceremonies)
- Rebecca Wilson (Ceremonies)
- Eddie Butler (Archery)
- Raelene Boyle (Athletics)
- Dave Culburt (Athletics/Beach Volleyball)
- Steve Moneghetti (Athletics)
- Steve Ovett (Athletics)
- Pat Welsh (Athletics)
- Peter Blackburn (Badminton)
- Kerryn Pratt (Badminton/Softball/Tennis)
- Chris Dittmar (Basketball)
- Andrew Gaze (Basketball)
- Rachael Sporn (Basketball)
- Basil Zempilas (Basketball/Canoe-Kayak/Rowing)
- Kerri Pottharst (Beach Volleyball)
- Julien Prosser (Beach Volleyball)
- Jim Neilly (Boxing)
- Richie Woodhall (Boxing)
- Peter Colquehoun (Canoe-Kayak/Cycling/Handball)
- Michael Felgate (Canoe-Kayak/Handball/Rowing)
- Darryl McCormack (Handball)
- Tom Williams (Canoe-Kayak)
- Neil Kearney (Cycling)
- Phil Liggett (Cycling)
- Mike Turtur (Cycling)
- Peter Donegan (Diving/Table Tennis/Tennis)
- Dean Pullar (Diving)
- Simon Marshall (Equestrian)
- Garry Wilkinson (Equestrian/Tennis)
- Gordon Bray (Football/Hockey/Shooting/Taekwondo)
- Mike McCann (Football)
- Liz Chetkovich (Gymnastics)
- Simon Reeve (Gymnastics)
- David Wansbrough (Hockey)
- Nicola Fairbrother (Judo)
- Nick Mullins (Judo)
- Nick Green (Rowing)
- Nick McCallum (Sailing)
- Shirley Robertson (Sailing)
- Richard Simmons (Sailing)
- Joyce Lester (Softball)
- Duncan Armstrong (Swimming)
- Daniel Kowalski (Swimming)
- Kerri Tepper (Table Tennis)
- Lauren Burns (Taekwondo)
- Greg Welsh (Triathlon)
- Jonathon Fogarty (Volleyball)
- Jon Harker (Water Polo)
- Debbie Watson (Water Polo)

=== Paralympic Games ===
==== Rio 2016 ====
- Matt Carmichael (Early Mornings Host)
- Johanna Griggs (Mornings Host)
- Mel McLaughlin (In Rio Today – Primetime Host)
- Lawrence Mooney (In Rio Today – Primetime Host)
- Annabelle Williams (In Rio Today – Primetime Host)
- Tom Williams (Late Nights Host)
- Steve Robilliard (Ceremonies Commentator)
- Dave Culburt (Commentator)
- Brenton Speed (Commentator)
- Darren Boyd (Commentator)
- Matt Hill (Commentator)
- Mathew Cowdrey (Swimming)
- Heath Francis (Athletics)
- Will Downing (Athletics)
- Amy Bainbridge (Cycling/Swimming)
- Duane Dell'Oca (Swimming)
- Heather Fell (Swimming)
- Neil Adams (Judo)
- Michaela Breeze (Powerlifting)
- Richard Drew (Table Tennis)
- Peter Odgers (Table Tennis/Wheelchair Tennis)
- Brent Pope (Wheelchair Basketball/Wheelchair Rugby)
- Tom Kirkland (Wheelchair Basketball)
- Dan Strange (Highlights Host/Wheelchair Basketball)
- Gerald de Kock (Weelchair Tennis/Ceremonies)
- Dylan Alcott (Reporter)
- Emily Angwin (Reporter)
- Emma Vosti (Reporter)

=== Commonwealth Games ===
==== Gold Coast 2018 ====
- Bruce McAvaney (Athletics/Ceremonies Commentator)
- Hamish McLachlan (Host)
- Johanna Griggs (Host)
- Mel McLaughlin (Host)
- Jim Wilson (Host)
- Todd Woodbridge (Host)
- Michael Felgate (7two Host)
- Mark Gibson (7two Host)
- Michael Zappone (7two Host)
- Basil Zempilas (Swimming Commentator)
- Dave Culbert (Athletics Commentator)
- Ian Thorpe (Swimming)
- Lord Sebastian Coe (Athletics)
- Steve Hooker (Athletics)
- Giaan Rooney (Swimming)
- Scott McGrory (Cycling)
- Kate Bates (Cycling)
- Aaron Royle (Triathlon)
- Tamsyn Lewis (Athletics)
- Edwina Bartholomew (The Star Host)
- Jason Richardson (The Star Host)
- Pat Welsh (Athletics Trackside/Countdown to the Games Host)
- Sharyn Ghidella (Countdown to the Games Host)
- Nathan Templeton (Swimming Poolside)
- Sam Lane (Cycling Trackside)
- Amanda Abate (Sports Update Reader)
- Rachael Finch (Reporter)
- Tom Williams (Reporter)
- Annabelle Williams (Reporter)
- Matthew Mitcham (Reporter)
- Emma Vosti (Reporter)
- Bill McDonald (Reporter)
- Curtis McGrath (Reporter)
- Andy Maher (Front Bar)
- Sam Pang (Front Bar)
- Mick Molloy (Front Bar)

=== Australian Rules Football ===
As Seven is forced to show viewers in Western Australia, South Australia, New South Wales and Queensland games featuring their respective teams live, sometimes it will show a different game at the same time into these markets then into the rest of Australia. On these occasions, it will pick up Fox Footy's coverage of the match.

==== AFL ====
CURRENT PLAY-BY-PLAY CALLERS

- James Brayshaw (2018–present) _{(also host)}
- Brian Taylor (2012–present)
- Hamish McLachlan (2012–present) _{(also host)}
- Alister Nicholson (2022–present)
- Jack Heverin (2026—present)
- Jo Wotton (2026—present)
- Ryan Daniels (2025—present) _{(only for locally-produced Channel 7 Perth games played at Optus Stadium) (also host)}
- Mark Readings (2025—present) _{(only for locally-produced Channel 7 Perth games played at Optus Stadium)}

CURRENT EXPERTER COMMENTATORS

- Matthew Richardson (2010—)
- Cameron Ling (2012—)
- Jude Bolton (2014—)
- Luke Hodge (2016—)
- Daisy Pearce (2016—2023, 2025–)
- Campbell Brown (2018—)
- Abbey Holmes (2018—)
- Jobe Watson (2019—)
- Dale Thomas (2020—)
- Joel Selwood (2024—)
- Erin Phillips (2024—)
- Nick Riewoldt (2025—)
- Kane Cornes (2025—)
- Kate McCarthy (2025—)
- Chad Wingard (2025—)
- Ben Cousins (2025—)

_{(only for locally-produced Channel 7 Perth games played at Optus Stadium)}

- Shaun McManus (2025—) _{(only for locally-produced Channel 7 Perth games played at Optus Stadium)}
- Mark LeCras (2025—) _{(only for locally-produced Channel 7 Perth games played at Optus Stadium)}
- Shane Crawford (2026—)

CURRENT BOUNDARY RIDERS

- Cameron Ling (2012–present)
- Jude Bolton (2014–present)
- Abbey Holmes (2018–present) _{(also host)}
- Campbell Brown (2018–present)
- Ryan Daniels (2020–present)
- Erin Phillips (2023–present)
- Rebecca Maddern (2025–present) _{(also host)}
- Mitch Cleary (2025–present)
- Dani Shuey (2025–present) _{(only for locally-produced Channel 7 Perth games played at Optus Stadium)}
- Anna Hay (2025–present) _{(only for locally-produced Channel 7 Perth games played at Optus Stadium)}
- Ben Cousins (2025–present) _{(only for locally-produced Channel 7 Perth games played at Optus Stadium)}

CURRENT JOURNALISTS

- Ryan Daniels (2020–present)
- Mitch Cleary (2022–present) – Chief Football Reporter
- Theo Doropoulos (2024–present)
- Kate Massey (2024–present)
- Xander McGuire (2025–present)
- Tom Morris (2026–present)

CURRENT AFL TALK SHOWS PERSONALS

AGENDA SETTERS: MONDAY NIGHT

- Craig Hutchison (2025–present) – The Agenda Setters Host _{(Monday & Wednesday)}
- Nick Riewoldt (2025–present) – The Agenda Setters Panellist _{(Monday & Wednesday)}
- Caroline Wilson (2025–present) – The Agenda Setters Panellist _{(Monday and Tuesday)}
- Kane Cornes (2025–present) – The Agenda Setters Host/Panellist _{(Panellist Monday, Host Tuesday)} & The Wash Up

Panellist

- Mitch Cleary (2025–present) – The Agenda Setters Fill-in Panellist/Reporter _{(Monday & Wednesday)}

AGENDA SETTERS: TUESDAY NIGHT

- Kane Cornes (2025–present) – The Agenda Setters Host/Panellist _{(Panellist Monday, Host Tuesday)} & The Wash Up Panellist
- Caroline Wilson (2025–present) – The Agenda Setters Panellist _{(Monday and Tuesday)}
- Luke Hodge (2025–present) – The Agenda Setters Panellist _{(Tuesday)}
- Dale Thomas (2025–present) – The Agenda Setters Panellist _{(Tuesday)}
- Tom Morris (2026–present) – The Agenda Setters Panellist

AGENDA SETTERS: WEDNESDAY NIGHT

- Craig Hutchison (2025–present) – The Agenda Setters Host _{(Monday & Wednesday)}
- Nick Riewoldt (2025–present) – The Agenda Setters Panellist _{(Monday & Wednesday)}
- Mitch Cleary (2025–present) – The Agenda Setters Fill-in Panellist/Reporter _{(Monday & Wednesday)}

Rotating 3rd Panelist

THE FRONT BAR

- Andy Maher (2016–present) – The Front Bar Host
- Mick Molloy (2014–present) – The Front Bar Panellist
- Sam Pang (2016–present) – The Front Bar Panellist
- Lawrence Mooney (2016–present) – The Front Bar Recurring Guest

UNFILTERED

- Hamish McLachlan (2025–present) – Unfiltered Host

SUNDAY FOOTY FEAST & THE WASH UP

- Jason Richardson (2025–present) – Sunday Footy Feast & The Wash Up Host
- Campbell Brown (2025–present) – Sunday Footy Feast & The Wash Up Panellist
- Kate McCarthy (2025–present) – Sunday Footy Feast & The Wash Up Panellist

Past Callers/Expert Commentator/Journalist/Reporter

- Tony Charlton (1957–1960) (Caller)
- Allan Nash (1964–1967) (Caller)
- Alan Gale (1962–1970) (Caller)
- Mike Williamson (1960–1976) (Caller)
- Frank Adams (1968–1978) (Expert Commentator)
- Doug Wade (1976–1982) (Caller)
- Jack Edwards (1964–1986) (Caller)
- Bob Skilton (1972–1973, 1978–1986) (Expert Commentator/Caller)
- Lou Richards (1974–1986) (Caller)
- Peter Donegan (1982–1986) (Field Commentator/Reporter)
- Dixie Marshall (1988–1990) (Field Commentator)
- Ted Whitten (1965–1970, 1992) (Expert Commentator/Caller)
- Max Stevens (1991–1993) (Field Commentator)
- Bernie Quinlan (1988–1994) (Expert Commentator)
- John Rogers (1988–1994) (Field Commentator)
- Stephen Phillips (1979–1985, 1992–1996) (Field Commentator/Reporter)
- Ross Glendinning (1989–1998) (Expert Commentator)
- Peter Landy (1977–1999) (Caller)
- Peter McKenna (1978–1999) (Caller)
- Terry Wheeler (1994–1999) (Caller/Expert Commentator)
- Rex Hunt (1996–1999) (Caller)
- Mick McGuane (1997–1999) (Expert Commentator)
- Drew Morphett (1988–2000) (Caller)
- Malcolm Blight (1988, 1995–1996, 2000) (Expert Commentator)
- Paul Roos (2000) (Expert Commentator)
- Sandy Roberts (1981–2001) (Caller)
- Scot Palmer (1982–2001) (Reporter)
- Ian Robertson (1988–2001) (Caller)
- Gerard Healy (1991–2001) (Expert Commentator)
- Kevin Bartlett (1994–2001) (Caller/Expert Commentator)
- Matthew Campbell (1994–2001) (Caller/Field Commentator)
- Neil Kerley (1994–2001) (Field Commentator)
- Robert Dipierdomenico (1994–2001) (Field Commentator)
- Mike Sheahan (1994–2001) (Reporter)
- Graham Cornes (1995–2001) (Expert Commentator)
- Adrian Barich (1995–2001) (Field Commentator)
- Anthony Hudson (1999–2001) (Caller/Field Commentator)
- Jason Dunstall (1999–2001) (Expert Commentator)
- Dale Lewis (1999–2001) (Expert Commentator)
- Richard Osborne (1999–2001) (Field Commentator/Expert Commentator)
- Tony Shaw (2000–2001) (Expert Commentator)
- Dermott Brereton (2000–2001) (Expert Commentator)
- Tony Lockett (2000–2001) (Expert Commentator)
- Craig Hutchison (2001) (Caller)
- Chris Dittmar (2001) (Caller)
- Robert Walls (2001) (Expert Commentator)
- Paul Salmon (2001) (Expert Commentator)
- Rick Olarenshaw (2007–2009) (Field Commentator)
- Nathan Buckley (2008–2009) (Expert Commentator)
- David Schwarz (2007–2011) (Expert Commentator)
- Michael Malthouse (2012) (Expert Commentator)
- Brett Kirk (2012) (Field Commentator)
- Peter Larkins (2012–2013) (Field Commentator)
- Tom Harley (2010–2014) (Expert Commentator)
- Mark McVeigh (2013–2014) (Field Commentator)
- Nick Maxwell (2014–2015) (Field Commentator)
- Dennis Cometti (1988–2001, 2007–2016) (Caller)
- Andrew Welsh (2014–2017) (Field Commentator)
- Brad Sewell (2015–2017) (Field Commentator)
- Peter Bell (2016–2018) (Field Commentator)
- Nat Edwards (2019) (Host)
- Xavier Ellis (2019) (Field Commentator)
- Sam Lane (2013–2019) (Reporter)
- Sam McClure (2017–2019) (Reporter)
- Michael Warner (2019) (Reporter)
- Bruce McAvaney (1990–2001, 2007–2020) (Caller)
- Gilbert McAdam (2018–2020) (Field Commentator)
- Leigh Matthews (1996–1998, 2009–2019, 2021) (Expert Commentator)
- Basil Zempilas (2012–2021) (Caller)
- Mark Stevens (2013–2021) (Reporter)
- Justin Leppitsch (2021) (Expert Commentator)
- Wayne Carey (2014–2022) (Expert Commentator)
- Jimmy Bartel (2017–2022) (Expert Commentator/Field Commentator)
- Nigel Carmody (2018–2019, 2021–2023) (Fill-in Caller)
- Tom Browne (2018–2023) (Reporter)
- Luke Darcy (2012–2024) (Caller/Expert Commentator)
- Shaun Burgoyne (2022–2024) (Expert Commentator)
- Nathan Jones (2022–2024) (Expert Commentator)
- Chris Johnson (2021–2024) (Expert Commentator/Field Commentator)
- Patrick Dangerfield (2023–2024) (Expert Commentator)
- Mark Soderstrom (2013–2024) (Field Commentator)
- Jason Bennett (2016–2025) (Play-by-Play Caller)

==== AFL Women's ====
Seven broadcast the AFL Women's Exhibition Matches between 2015 and 2016 before becoming the inaugural FTA broadcaster of the AFLW in 2017.

Current

- Alister Nicholson (2022–present) (Host/Caller)
- Jason Bennett (2015–present) (Host/Caller)
- Nigel Carmody (2017–present) (Host/Caller)
- Jo Wotton (2020–present) (Caller)
- Theo Doropoulos (2024–present) (Caller)
- Jack Heverin (2025–present) (Caller)
- Abbey Holmes (2016–present) (Host/Expert Commentator)
- Erin Phillips (2024–present) (Expert/Field Commentator)
- Kate McCarthy (2024–present) (Expert Commentator)
- Mel Hickey (2021–present) (Expert Commentator)
- Libby Birch (2022–present) (Expert Commentator)
- Nat Edwards (2018–present) (Host/Field Commentator)
- Kate Massey (2024–present) (Host/Field Commentator)
- Sarah Olle (2023–present) (Host/Field Commentator)
- Andrew McCormack (2025–present) (Field Commentator)
- Alissa Ballin (2024–present) (Field Commentator QLD)
- Hànni Howe (2025–present) (Field Commentator SA)
- Dani Shuey (2019–2020, 2025–present) (Field Commentator WA)

Past

- Andy Maher (2017) (Host)
- Tegan Higginbotham (2017) (Host)
- Lawrence Mooney (2017) (Host)
- Abbey Gelmi (2020–2024) (Host)
- Lauren Arnell (2017–2018) (Expert Commentator)
- Katie Brennan (2017) (Expert Commentator)
- Alana Smith-Fagan (2017) (Field Commentator)
- Peta Searle (2017–2019) (Expert Commentator)
- Daisy Pearce (2017–2023) (Expert Commentator)
- Basil Zempilas (2020) (Caller)
- Georgie Parker (2019–2020) (Expert Commentator)
- Emma Kearney (2019–2020) (Expert Commentator)
- Mark Readings (2019–2020) (Field Commentator WA Games)
- Jacqui Felgate (2019–2022) (Host/Field Commentator)
- Josie Fielding (2021–2023) (Field Commentator QLD Games)
- Nathan Jones (2022–2024) (Expert Commentator)
- Chelsea Randall (2018–2024) (Expert Commentator)
- Anna Hay (2022–2024) (Field Commentator WA Games)
- Ryan Daniels (2020–2024) (Field Commentator WA Games)

==== EJ Whitten Legends Game ====
- Brian Taylor (2016–2019) (Caller)
- Luke Darcy (2016) (Caller)
- James Brayshaw (2017–2019) (Caller)
- Brendon Fevola (2016) (Expert Commentator)
- Anthony Lehmann (2016) (Field Commentator)
- Tim Watson (2018–2019) (Expert Commentator)
- Gilbert McAdam (2019) (Field Commentator)
- Robert DiPierdomenico (2018–2019) (Field Commentator)

==== International Rules Series ====
- Anthony Hudson (2000) (Caller)
- Drew Morphett (1999–2000) (Caller)
- Dennis Cometti (2008) (Host/Caller)
- Bruce McAvaney (2008) (Host/Caller)
- Basil Zempilas (2008, 2014, 2017) (Host/Caller)
- Mark Soderstrom (2017) (Caller)
- Mark Readings (2017) (Caller)
- Leigh Matthews (2000) (Expert Commentator)
- Robert DiPierdomenico (1999–2000) (Field Commentator)
- Tim Watson (2008) (Expert Commentator)
- David Schwartz (2008) (Expert Commentator)
- Rick Olarenshaw (2008) (Field Commentator)
- Cameron Ling (2014) (Expert Commentator)
- Setanta Ó hAilpín (2014) (Expert Commentator)
- Tadhg Kennelly (2008, 2017) (Expert Commentator)
- Mark Bickley (2017) (Expert Commentator)
- Peter Bell (2017) (Expert Commentator)

==== Victorian Football League ====
Current

- Jason Bennett (2015–present) (Host/Caller)
- Nigel Carmody (2015–present) (Caller)
- Campbell Brown (2015–present) Expert Commentator)
- Libby Birch (2022–present) (Field Commentator)

Past

- Alicia Eva (2017) (Field Commentator)
- Tristan Foenander (2017) (Field Commentator)
- Lauren Arnell (2016–2019) (Field Commentator/Expert Commentator)
- Nathan Templeton (2017–2019) (Field Commentator)
- Michael Barlow(2019–2021) (Expert Commentator)
- Abbey Gelmi (2021) (Host)
- Abbey Holmes (2016–2018, 2021) (Field Commentator/Analysis)
- Georgie Parker (2019, 2021) (Analysis)
- Adam Cooney (2021) (Analysis)
- Heath Shaw (2021) (Analysis)

==== WAFL ====
Current

- Mark Readings (2015–present) (Host/Caller)
- Glenn Mitchell (2016–present) (Caller)
- Karl Langdon (2015, 2018, 2021–present) (Caller)
- Xavier Ellis (2018–present) (Expert Commentator)
- Lee Spurr (2019–present) (Expert Commentator/Field Commentator)
- Steve Butler (2016–present) (Field Commentator)

Past

- Dennis Cometti (1984–1987, 2017–2020) (Caller/Expert Commentator)
- Bob Miller (1970s–1986) (Caller)
- John Rogers (1976–1987) (Caller)
- Harvey Deegan (1977–1982) (Caller)
- Peter Ensell (1970s–1987) (Caller)
- Eric Sarich (1970s–1987) (Expert Commentator)
- Percy Johnson (1980s) (Caller/Expert Commentator)
- Frank Sparrow (1970s–1987) (Caller)
- Arthur Marshall (1970s–1986) (Caller/Expert Commentator)
- Nick Rynne (2015) (Field Commentator)
- Cassie Silver (2015) (Field Commentator)
- Peter Bell (2016–2018) (Expert Commentator)
- Paul Hasleby (2016–2018) (Expert Commentator)
- Andrew Embley (2015–2016) (Expert Commentator)

==== SANFL ====
Current

- Mark Soderstrom (2014–present) (Host/Caller)
- John Casey (2014–present) (Caller)
- Tim Ginever (2014–present) (Expert Commentator)
- Rhett Biglands (2016–present) (Expert Commentator/Field Commentator)
- Andrew Hayes (2018–present) (Field Commentator)

Past

- Rick Keegan (1980s) Host
- Bob Jervis (1980s) (Commentator)
- Blair Schwartz (1980s) (Commentator)
- Ian Day (1980s) (Commentator)
- Bruce McAvaney (1980s) (Commentator)
- Peter Marker (1980s) (Commentator)
- Alana Smith-Fagan (2016–2017) (Field Commentator)
- Tom Wilson (2015–2017) (Field Commentator)

=== Cricket ===
==== Australian Men's Test Cricket ====
Current

- Mel McLaughlin (Host/Ball-by-Ball-Caller) (2018/19–present)
- James Brayshaw(Host/Ball-by-Ball Caller) (2001, 2018/19–present)
- Alison Mitchell (Host/Ball-by-Ball Caller) (2018/19–present)
- Tim Lane (Ball-by-Ball Caller) (2018/19–present)
- Alister Nicholson (Ball-by-Ball Caller) (2018/19, 2021/22–present)
- Ricky Ponting (Expert Commentator) (2018/19–present)
- Damien Fleming (Expert Commentator) (2018/19–present)
- Greg Blewett (Host/Expert Commentator) (2018/19–present)
- Trent Copeland (Touch Screen Analyst) (2018/19–present)
- Simon Katich (Expert Commentator) (2018/19–present)
- Simon Taufel (Umpire Expert Commentator) (2020/21–present)
- Matthew Hayden (Expert Commentator) (2020/21–present)
- Holly Ferling (Expert Commentator) (2020/21–present)
- Peter Lalor (Lunch Panelist) (2018/19–present)
- Gideon Haigh (Lunch Panelist) (2018/19–present)
- Glenn McGrath (Expert Commentator) (2018/19–2019/20, 2021/22–present)
- Justin Langer (Expert Commentator) (2022/23–present)

International Expert Commentators

- Aakash Chopra (India/Border-Gavaskar Series) (2018/19)
- Marvan Atapattu (Sri Lanka/Warne-Muralitharan Series) (2019)
- Phil Tufnell (Sri Lanka/Warne-Muralitharan Series) (2019)
- Brendon McCullum (New Zealand/Trans-Tasman Trophy Series) (2019/20)
- Ramiz Raja (Pakistan Series) (2019)
- Sunil Gavaskar (India/Border-Gavaskar Series) (2020/21)
- Sir Ian Botham (England/Ashes Series) (2021/22)
- Michael Atherton (England/Ashes Series) (2021/22)
- Isabelle Westbury (England/Ashes Series Lunch Panelist) (2021/22)
- Dean Wilson (England/Ashes Series Lunch Panelist) (2021/22)
- Ian Bishop (West Indies/Sir Frank Worrell Trophy) (2022, 2024)
- Jonty Rhodes (South Africa Series) (2022/23)
- Waqar Younis (Pakistan Series) (2023/24)

Past

- Bruce McAvaney (Presenter) (2018–2019)
- Hamish McLachlan (Presenter/Interviewer) (2018/19)
- Jason Gillespie (Expert Commentator) (2018–2019)
- Abbey Gelmi (Reporter) (2018/19–2019/20)
- Emma Vosti (Reporter) (2018/19–2019/20)
- Michael Slater (Expert Commentator) (2018/19–2020/21)
- Neil Kearney (Reporter) (2018/19–2020/21)
- Andy Maher (Host/Ball-by-Ball Caller) (2021/22)
- Jason Richardson (Ball-by-Ball Caller) (2021/22)
- Brad Hodge (Expert Commentator) (2021/22)
- Callum Ferguson (Expert Commentator) (2021/22)
- Lisa Sthalekar (Expert Commentator) (2021/22)
- Dirk Nannes (Expert Commentator) (2021/22)

==== Women's International Matches ====
Current

- Abbey Gelmi (Host) (2018/19–present)
- Erin Holland (Host) (2019/20–present)
- Alison Mitchell (International Ball-by-Ball Caller) (2021/22)
- Andy Maher (Host/Ball-by-Ball Caller) (2018/19–present)
- Jason Richardson (Host/Ball-by-Ball Caller) (2018/19–present)
- Lisa Sthalekar (Expert Commentator) (2018/19–present)
- Holly Ferling (Host/Expert Commentator) (2019/20–present)
- Elyse Villani (Expert Commentator) (2019/20–present)
- Brad Hodge (Expert Commentator) (2019–present)
- Kirby Short (Expert Commentator) (2020/21–present)
- Alister Nicholson (Ball-by-Ball Caller) (2018/19, 2021/22–present)
- Simon Taufel (Umpire Expert) (2021/22–present)
- Emma Inglis (Expert Commentator) (2021/22–present)
- Trent Copeland (Expert Commentator) (2021/22–present)
- Isabelle Westbury (Expert Commentator) (2021/22–present)

Past

- Mel McLaughlin (Host) (2018/19)
- Pat Cummins (Expert Commentator) (2018/19)
- Mitch Starc (Expert Commentator) (2018/19)
- Mark Readings (Ball-by-Ball Caller) (2018/19)
- Dirk Nannes (Expert Commentator) (2018/19)
- Jason Gillespie (Expert Commentator) (2018/19)
- Kristen Beams (Expert Commentator) (2019/20)
- Belinda Clark (Expert Commentator) (2020/21)
- Mel Jones (Expert Commentator) (2020/21)
- Damien Fleming (Expert Commentator) (2020/21)
- Jess Duffin (Expert Commentator) (2020/21)
- Julia Price (Expert Commentator) (2018/19–2020/21)

==== Big Bash League ====
Current

- Mel McLaughlin (Host) (2018/19–present)
- Abbey Gelmi (Host) (2018/19–present)
- Erin Holland (Host/Boundary Commentator) (2019/20–present)
- Andy Maher (Host/Ball-by-Ball Caller) (2018/19–present)
- Jason Richardson (Host/Ball-by-Ball Caller) (2018/19–present)
- James Brayshaw (Host/Ball-by-Ball Caller) (2018/19–present)
- Alister Nicholson (Host/Ball-by-Ball Caller) (2018/19–present)
- Ricky Ponting (Expert Commentator) (2018/19–present)
- Damien Fleming (Expert Commentator) (2018/19–present)
- Greg Blewett (Expert Commentator) (2018/19–present)
- Brad Hodge (Expert Commentator) (2018/19–present)
- Lisa Sthalekar (Expert Commentator) (2018/19–present)
- Trent Copeland (Expert Commentator) (2019/20—present)
- Callum Ferguson (Expert Commentator) (2021/22–present)
- Glenn Maxwell (Expert Commentator) (2020/21–present)
- Marcus Stoinis (Expert Commentator (2020/21–present)
- Aaron Finch (Expert Commentator (2021/22–present)
- Andre Russell (Expert Commentator (2021/22–present)
- Ashton Agar (Expert Commentator) (2021/22–present)
- Andrew Gaze (Guest Commentator) (2021/22–present)
- Sam Billings (Guest Commentator) (2021/22–present)
- Will Pucovski (Guest Commentator) (2021/22–present)
- Holly Ferling (Expert Commentator/Boundary Commentator) (2021/22–present)
- Ryan Daniels (Perth Boundary Commentator) (2020/21–present)
- Theo Doropoulos (Adelaide Boundary Commentator) (2021/22–present)
- Elyse Villani (Expert Commentator/Tasmania Boundary Commentator) (2019/20, 2021/22–present)
- Nazeem Hussain (Guest Commentator) (2021/22–present)
- Dirk Nannes (Expert Commentator) (2018/19, 2021/22–present)
- Justin Langer (Expert Commentator) (2022/23–present)

Past

- Amelia Mulcahy (Adelaide Boundary Commentator) (2018/19–2019/20)
- Tom Cooper (Tasmania Boundary Commentator) (2018/19–2019/20)
- Ryan Daniels (Perth Boundary Commentator) (2018/19–2019/20)
- Brian Lara (Expert Commentator) (2020/21)
- Brendon McCullum (Expert Commentator) (2019/20)
- Tim Paine (Expert Commentator) (2019/20)
- Phil Tufnell (Expert Commentator) (2018/19)
- Sam McClure (Boundary Commentator) (2018/19–2019/20)
- Jim Wilson (Host/Boundary Commentator) (2018/19–2019/20)
- Michael Slater (Expert Commentator) (2018/19–2020/21)
- Natalie Yoannidis (2022/23)

==== Women's Big Bash League ====
Current

- Abbey Gelmi (Host) (2018/19–present)
- Erin Holland (Host) (2021/22–present)
- Andy Maher (Host/Ball-by-Ball Caller) (2018/19–2019/20, 2021/22–present)
- Jason Richardson (Host/Ball-by-Ball Caller) (2018/19–2019/20, 2021/22–present)
- Lisa Sthalekar (Expert Commentator) (2018/19–present)
- Brad Hodge (Expert Commentator) (2018/19–present)
- Alister Nicholson (Ball-by-Ball Caller) (2021/22–present)
- Kristen Beams (Expert Commentator) (2021/22–present)
- Emma Inglis (Expert Commentator) (2021/22–present)
- Callum Ferguson (Expert Commentator) (2021/22–present)
- Kirby Short (Expert Commentator) (2021/22–present)
- Emily Smith (Expert Commentator) (2021/22–present)
- Ryan Daniels (Boundary Commentator) (2021/22–present)

Past

- Amelia Mulcahy (Boundary Commentator) (2018/19–2019/20)
- Dirk Nannes (Expert Commentator) (2018/19)
- Mel Jones (Caller) (2020/21)
- Julia Price (Expert Commentator) (2018/19–2020/21)
- Katey Martin (Expert Commentator) (2020/21)
- Megan Barnard (Host) (2020/21)
- Michael Slater (Caller) (2020/21)
- Trent Copeland (Expert Commentator) (2019/20–2020/21)

==== Other Cricket presenters ====
- Jeff Thomson (2001)
- Tony Squires (2005)
- Stuart MacGill (2005)
- Kerry O'Keeffe (2005)
- Kath Loughnan (Bushfire Bash Boundary Commentator) (2020)
- Mark Howard (Bushfire Bash Commentator) (2020)

=== Tennis ===
==== Final ====
Wimbledon

- Todd Woodbridge (Host/Commentator)
- Rennae Stubbs (Commentator)
- Sam Smith (Commentator)
- John Newcombe (Commentator)
- Geoff Masters (Commentator)
- Jim Courier (Expert comments)
- Darren Cahill (Expert comments)

Davis Cup

- Todd Woodbridge (Host/Commentator)
- Basil Zempilas (Host/Commentator, Perth events)
- John Fitzgerald (Commentator)
- Roger Rasheed (Commentator)

Past

- Garry Wilkinson (1976–2014) (Host/Commentator)
- Kylie Gillies (1996–2010) (Reporter/Presenter, Australian Open)
- Bruce McAvaney (1990–2016) (Commentator)
- Scherri-Lee Biggs (2013–2014) (Reporter)
- John Alexander (1987–2010) (Commentator)
- Sandy Roberts (1980–2013) (Host/MC/Commentator)
- Tracy Austin (2006–2010) (Commentator)
- Matthew White (2005–2012, 2014) (Host/Commentator)
- Tom Williams (2000s–2013) (Reporter)
- Luke Darcy (2014) (Host/Commentator, Brisbane International)
- Johanna Griggs (1990s–2012, 2014) (Host)
- Rebecca Maddern (2014–2015) (Reporter)
- Jo Griggs (2016) (Early Morning Host)
- Jim Wilson (2014–2016) (Afternoon Host)
- Dave Culbert (2016) (Afternoon Host)
- Jason Richardson (2016) (Late Evening Host)
- Kim Clijsters (2016) (Commentator)
- Giaan Rooney (2013, 2015) (Reporter)
- Alicia Molik (2011, 2015) (Commentator)

=== Horse Racing ===
Present

- Bruce McAvaney (Host, 2013–present)
- Jason Richardson (Host, 2018–present)
- Emma Freedman (Host, 2021–present)
- Hamish McLachlan (Presenter/Reporter, 2013–present)
- Simon Marshall (Racing Analyst, 2013–present)
- Katelyn Mallyon (Racing Analyst, 2017–present)
- Michelle Payne (Racing Analyst, 2020–present)
- Deane Lester (Racing Analyst)
- Lee Freedman (Racing Analyst)
- Gerard Middleton (Racing Analyst)
- Henry Dwyer (Racing Analyst)
- Ben Way (Betting ring)
- John Letts (Interviews, 2013–present)
- Nigel Carmody (Trackside Reporter)
- Lizzie Jelfs (Trackside Reporter, 2020–present)
- Emily Bosson (Trackside Reporter)
- Emma Vosti (Reporter)
- Kate Waterhouse (Reporter)
- Stephanie Rice (Reporter, 2021–present)

Past

- Giaan Rooney (2013)
- Scherri-Lee Biggs (2012–2013)
- Sonia Kruger (2002–2011)
- Matthew White (2004–2012)
- Glen Boss (2011)
- Sandy Roberts (2002–2013)
- Kylie Gillies (2002–2006)
- Rebecca Maddern (2013–2015)
- Ryan Phelan (2014–2020)
- Rachael Finch (Presenter/Reporter, 2011–2018)
- Hamish McLachlan (Presenter/Reporter, 2007–2018)
- Edwina Bartholomew (Presenter/Reporter, 2013–2018)
- John Letts (Interviews, 2002–2018)
- Johanna Griggs (Presenter/Reporter, 2002–2018)
- Pat Welsh (Presenter/Reporter, 2002–2018)
- Ryan Phelan (Presenter/Reporter, 2014–2018)
- Basil Zempilas (MC, 2014–2018)
- Hugh Bowman (Racing Analyst, 2020)

=== Motor Racing ===
==== Supercars Championship ====
Current

- Matthew White (Host/Commentator, 2007–April 2014, 2026–present)
- Chad Neylon (Support category commentator/Commentator, 2013–2014, 2021–present)
- Matt Naulty (Commentator, 2022–present)
- Richard Crail (Commentator, 2022–present)
- Garth Tander (Expert Commentator, 2021–present)
- Mark Larkham (Pit reporter/Expert Analysis, 2008–2014, 2021–present)
- Riana Crehan (Pit Reporter, 2022–present)
- Molly Taylor (Pit reporter, 2021–present)
- Jack Perkins (Expert Commentator, 2021–present)
- Chris Stubbs (Reporter, 2021–present)
- Craig Lowndes (Expert Commentator, 2021–present)
- Mark Winterbottom (Expert Commentator, 2026–present)
- James Courtney (Expert Commentator, 2026–present)

Past

- Neil Crompton (Host/Commentator/V8 Xtra Host, 2007–2014, 2021–2025)
- Mark Skaife (Commentator, 2009–2014, 2021–2025)
- Greg Murphy (Pit reporter/Commentator, 2012–2014)
- Aaron Noonan (Support category commentator, 2007–2014)
- Tom Williams (Reporter, 2007–2013)
- Daniel Gibson (Pit reporter, 2007–2008)
- Grant Denyer (Pit reporter, 2007–2011)
- Abbey Gelmi (Host, 2021–2022)
- Charli Robinson (Reporter, 2021–2022)
- Brad Hodge (Reporter, 2021–2022)

==== Bathurst 12 Hour ====
- Mark Beretta (Host/Pit reporter, 2015–2020, 2022–present)
- Chris Stubbs (Host/Pit reporter, 2020)
- Neil Crompton (Host, 2020)
- Richard Craill (Commentator, 2015–2020, 2022–present)
- Garth Tander (Commentator, 2022–present)
- Graham Goodwin (Commentator, 2015–2017)
- Jonny Palmer (Commentator, 2018–2020)
- Matt Naulty (Commentator, 2022–present)
- John Hindhaugh (Commentator, 2015–2020, 2023–present)
- Shea Adam (Pit reporter, 2015–2020, 2023–present)
- Chad Neylon (Pit reporter, 2016–2020, 2022–present)
- Briony Ingerson (Reporter, 2017–2019, 2022–present)
- Charli Robinson (Pit reporter, 2020, 2022)
- Alex Hart (Reporter, 2018–2019)

==== TCR Australia & GT World Challenge Australia ====
- Mark Beretta (Host, 2020–2021)
- Abbey Gelmi (Host, 2020–2021)
- Richard Craill (Commentator, 2020–2021)
- Greg Rust (Commentator, 2020–2021)
- Matt Naulty (Commentator, 2020–2021)
- Chris Stubbs (Commentator, Pit reporter, 2020–2021)
- Cameron van den Dungen (Commentator, 2020)
- Molly Taylor (Pit reporter, 2020–2021)
- Jack Perkins (Pit reporter, 2020–2021)
- Jess Dane (Pit reporter, 2020–2021)

=== Rugby League ===
==== 2017 Rugby League World Cup ====
- Jim Wilson (Host)
- Dan Ginnane (Caller)
- Andrew Moore (Caller)
- Mark Braybrook (Caller)
- Brett Kimmorley (Expert Analysis/Sideline Commentator)
- Laurie Daley (Expert Analysis)
- Gary Belcher (Expert Commentator)
- Andrew Ryan (Expert Commentator)
- Scott Sattler (Expert Commentator)
- Brent Tate (Sideline Commentator)
- Adrian Morley (Expert Commentator)
- Ryan Girdler (Sideline Commentator)
- Shane Webcke (Commentator)
- Benji Marshall (Expert Analysis)
- Mark Geyer (Expert Analysis)
- Josh Massoud (Reporter)
- Liam Cox (Reporter)
- Pat Welsh (Reporter)
- Michelle Bishop (Reporter)
- Chris Garry (Reporter)
- Renee Gartner (Reporter/Commentator – Women's Matches)
- Allana Ferguson (Expert Analysis/Commentator – Women's Matches)
- David Tapp (Commentator – Women's Matches)
- Drury Forbes (Commentator – Women's Matches)
- Bill Harrigan (Commentator – Women's Matches)
- Nathan Cayless (Commentator – Women's Matches)

=== Golf ===
Current

- Pat Welsh (Host/Commentator, 2012–present)
- Wayne Grady (Commentator, 2012–present)
- Grant Dodd (Commentator, 2012–present)
- Ewan Porter (Commentator, 2017–present)
- Todd Woodbridge (On Course Commentator/Reporter, 2017–present)
- Alison Whitaker (On Course Commentator/Reporter, 2017–present)
- Bree Laughlin (Reporter, 2017–present)
- Jason Richardson (Host, 2018–present)

Past

- Sandy Roberts (Host/Commentator, 2012–2013)
- Peter Donegan (Host/Commentator, 2014–2016)
- Ian Baker-Finch (Commentator, 2012–2016)

=== Swimming ===
- Basil Zempilas (Host/Commentator, 1998–2019)
- Giaan Rooney (Commentator, 2018–2019)
- Ian Thorpe (Commentator, 2018–2019)
- Nathan Templeton (Poolside Commentator, 2018–2019)

=== Stawell Gift ===
Current

- Jason Richardson (Host)
- Dave Culbert (Commentator)
- Melinda Gainsford-Taylor (Expert Commentator)

Past

- Peter Donegan (Host/Commentator)

=== Rugby Union ===
==== Rugby World Series ====
- Mark Doran (Host/Commentator, 2018)
- Gordon Bray (Commentator, 2018)
- Ashley Morrison (Commentator, 2018)
- Michael Lynagh (Commentator, 2018)
- Tony Lewis (Commentator, 2018)
- Scott Fava (Commentator, 2018)
- Peter Rowsthorn (Commentator, 2018)
- Dani Orlando (Reporter, 2018)
- Sam Longley (Field Reporter, 2018)

=== Soccer ===
==== 2002/2006 FIFA World Cup qualification (inter-confederation play-offs) ====
- Sandy Roberts (host)
- Craig Foster (pitchside commentator)
- Paul Wade (co-commentator)
- Paul Williams (commentator)

==== Manchester United vs Perth Glory/Leeds United 2019 ====
- Mark Readings (Host, 2019)
- Mel McLaughlin (Host, 2019)
- David Davutovic (Commentator, 2019)
- Stan Lazaridis (Commentator, 2019)
- David Basheer (Commentator, 2019)

==== Sydney FC v Tottenham 2015 ====
- Jim Wilson (Host, 2015)
- Archie Thompson (Commentator, 2015)

==== A-League All Stars 2013/14, Liverpool v Victory 2013 ====
- Jim Wilson (Host, 2013)
- Robbie Thomson (Commentator, 2013)
- Michael Bridges (Commentator, 2013)

==== Matilda's Olympic Qualifiers 2016 ====
- Jason Richardson (host, 2016)
- Melissa Barbieri (analysis, 2016)
- Brenton Speed (commentator, 2016)

==== 2023 FIFA Women's World Cup ====
- Bruce McAvaney (host)
- Mel McLaughlin (host)
- David Basheer (commentator)
- Grace Gill (co-commentator)
- Heather Garriock (pundit)
- Elise Kellond-Knight (pundit)
- Adam Peacock (pitchside commentator)
- Emma Freedman (reporter)

== Logo history ==
1975–1988

1989–1999

2000–2003

2003–2011

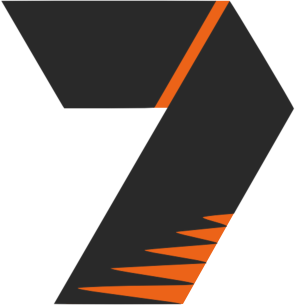
2012–2014

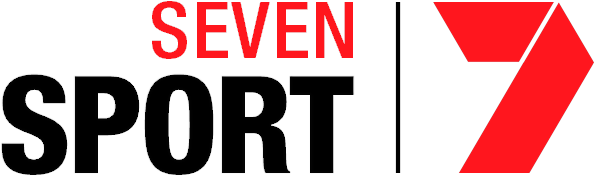
January 2015 – 2018

September 2018 – June 2020

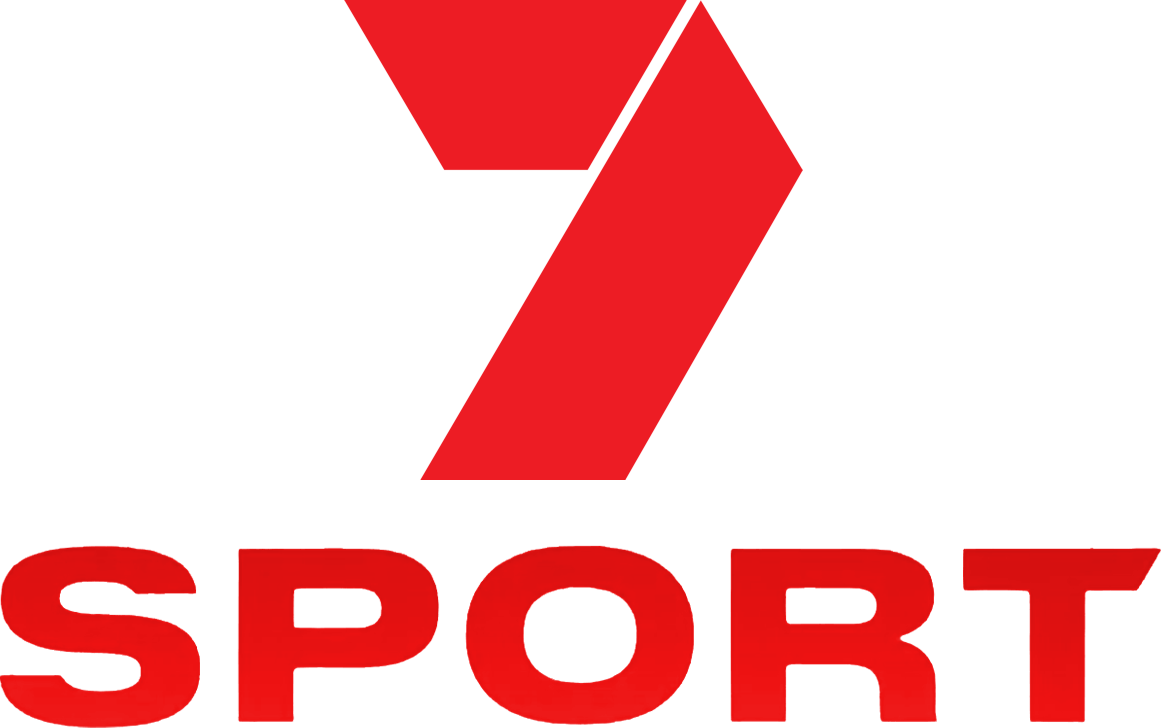
June 2020 – March 2021, September 2024 – present

March 2021 – September 2024

== Awards ==
Sports coverage and programs made by Seven Sport have been won and been nominated for several awards at the Logie Awards.

== See also ==
- ABC Sport
- Nine's Wide World of Sports
- 10 Sport
- SBS Sport
- Fox Sports (Australia)
- Stan Sport
- List of Australian television series
- List of longest running Australian television series
