= Stumped (radio programme) =

- Genre: Sport
- Running time: 26 minutes
- Country of origin: United Kingdom
- Language(s): English
- Home station: BBC World Service
- Syndicates: ABC NewsRadio; Akashvani
- Hosted by: Alison Mitchell; Jim Maxwell; Charu Sharma
- Produced by: Sam Sheringham
- Edited by: Matt Davies
- Recording studio: MediaCityUK, Salford
- Original release: 17 January 2015
- Audio format: Mono
- Website: Official website
- Podcast: www.bbc.co.uk/programmes/p02gsrmh/episodes/downloads

Stumped is a weekly cricket show from the BBC World Service produced in association with the Australian Broadcasting Corporation and Akashvani (formerly known as All India Radio). Stumped is produced by BBC Sport for the BBC World Service.

== Presenters ==
Stumped has three presenters: Alison Mitchell from the BBC's Test Match Special, ABC Grandstand commentator Jim Maxwell, and Charu Sharma, English language commentator for Akashvani.

== Content ==
The first series of 12 episodes coincided with the 2015 Cricket World Cup, in Australia and New Zealand. Mitchell presented the show from Melbourne, with Jim Maxwell in Sydney and Prakash Wakankar in Mumbai. Episodes examine the headlines of the week and presents features on topics such as cricket terminology and the sport's influence on the Bollywood film industry.

The BBC's Test Match Special commentator Henry Blofeld appears in each episode with his 'tales from the test', where he shares stories from his travels. In one episode, Blofeld describes how he drove from London to Mumbai in a vintage Rolls-Royce. His tale of a tea interval in Cyprus where the players were served retsina made for an interesting evening session.

Charu Sharma replaced Prakash Wakankar as the All India Radio presenter for the first half of the second series.

Stumped can be heard across the weekend on all three radio partners: at 00:30 GMT Saturday on the BBC World Service, at 11:30 IST on AIR FM Rainbow, and at 11:30 AEDST Sunday on ABC NewsRadio. The show can also be downloaded as a podcast from 01:00 GMT Saturday, immediately after its broadcast on the World Service.
