= ABC Sports (disambiguation) =

ABC Sports is the former name of ESPN on ABC, a name of sports programs on the American Broadcasting Company in the US.

ABC Sports may also refer to:

- ABC Sport, a sports programming division of the Australian Broadcasting Corporation in Australia
- One Sports, formerly known as ABC Sports, a sports programming division of TV5 in the Philippines
