= Matt Hill (race caller) =

Australian race caller and broadcaster

Matthew Hill (born 1980 or 1981) is an Australian race caller and sports broadcaster. Hill is currently the chief race caller in Victoria, having called the Melbourne Cup since 2017, previously having been the chief race caller in Sydney. Hill is also an AFL commentator, and has commentated numerous Olympics, the Australian Open and various other sports, as well as calling the UK's Grand National for the BBC on multiple occasions.

== Early life ==
Hill grew up in Altona where he attended St Paul's College. Having been exposed to horse racing at a young age through both his grandfather and through a family friend who was a trainer, Hill became intent on becoming a race caller. Regularly attending Flemington with a tape recorder and pair of binoculars, Hill practised the skill during his teenage years and began to make himself known to people within the industry. From this he was offered roles calling barrier trials and non-TAB greyhound meets, and calling his first horse race at Healesville at the age of 16.

== Career ==
In 2000, Hill was awarded the inaugural John Tapp Scholarship from Sky Racing, and from this began his professional career as a race caller for Sky Racing in NSW. During his tenure in NSW, he filled in for five Melbourne metro meetings in 2003, getting the opportunity to call races at Flemington for the first time while Greg Miles, who Hill has repeatedly said that he models himself off, was on leave. Hill would go on to become the chief race caller in Sydney for five years at the age of 28, taking over from Ian Craig.

While commentating the 2008 Beijing Olympics for the first time for radio station 2GB, Hill had a serious health scare, contracting melioidosis resulting in severe pneumonia which required he be put into an induced coma for 4 days. The disease has a poor prognosis and it was feared Hill would not have a recovery. After being medevaced by air to Hong Kong to receive treatment, he spent another 5 weeks in hospital before making a full recovery.

At the start of 2015, Hill quit race calling to focus on AFL commentary for ABC Grandstand. He said at the time that he always wanted to be more than just a race caller, wanting to become "next Bruce McAvaney".

In late 2017, Hill made a return to racing, becoming the chief race caller in Victoria upon Greg Miles's retirement after 35 years in the role. He quickly went on to work at his first Cox Plate, where he called Winx's historic third win, and soon after achieved his lifelong dream of calling the Melbourne Cup.

Over the subsequent years, Hill continued to pursue a career in AFL commentary, working for Seven alongside Brian Taylor in 2022 where he was widely praised for his commentary style, and calling his first AFL Grand Final for SEN's AFL Nation in 2023. In 2024, Hill became a semi-regular commentator on Fox Footy, before being elevated to a role calling Thursday nights alongside Mark Howard from 2025.
