= Simon Marshall =

Simon Marshall may refer to:

- Simon Marshall (jockey), Australian former jockey and media personality
- Simon Marshall (cricketer) (born 1982), English cricketer
