= Nathan Templeton =

Nathan Templeton may refer to:

- Nathan Templeton (Commander in Chief), a character in the TV series Commander in Chief
- Nathan Templeton (journalist), Australian sports presenter and reporter
