= Kate Anderson-Richardson =

Australian runner (born 1973)

Personal information
- Born: 5 November 1973 (age 52)

Sport
- Country: Australia
- Sport: Track and field
- Event(s): Women's 5000m, 10000m
Medal record
Women's Athletics
Representing Australia
Gold medal – first place	1998 Kuala Lumpur	5000 m

Kate Suzanne Richardson (née Anderson; born 5 November 1973 in Melbourne, Victoria) is an Australian athlete, who represented her native country at the 1996 Summer Olympics and 2000 Summer Olympics in the women's 5000 metres making the Semi Finals. Richardson (née Anderson) was a finalist in the 1997 World Championship 5000m (Athens, Greece), and also represented Australia in the 1999 World Championships (Seville, Spain) plus numerous World Cross-Country Championships.

In November 1999 she married fellow runner Jason A. Richardson. She is a two-time national champion in the women's 5000 metres and former Australian record holder over 1500m (breaking Jenny Orr's 20+ year record) and 5000m.

Richardson won a gold medal at the 1998 Commonwealth Games, in the 5000m event, after suffering a severe kidney infection which had led her to be bedridden less than a year earlier.
