= Alison Mitchell =

English Australian cricket commentator

Alison Mitchell is an English Australian cricket commentator and sports broadcaster, working for the BBC, Australia's Channel 7 and the Australian Open among others. She was the first woman to become a regular commentator on the BBC's Test Match Special, and has been commentating on men's and women's international cricket around the world since 2007.

She also spent many years reporting and commentating on a variety of sports for BBC Radio 5 Live and BBC Radio 5 Sports Extra, including Olympic and Commonwealth Games, Wimbledon, Australian Open, French Open and Open Golf. In March 2014, she was voted SJA Sports Broadcaster of the Year 2013 by members of the Sports Journalists' Association. She is also the first woman to have called men's cricket ball-by-ball on ABC Radio Grandstand in Australia.

== Early life ==
Born to an Australian mother and English father, Mitchell began her broadcasting career with the BBC as a part-time broadcast assistant at BBC Radio Northampton while studying for A-levels at Wellingborough School, where she later spent time as a committee member of the Old Wellingburians. She played many sports at school, captaining the tennis, netball and athletics squads.

She played hockey competitively, representing Northamptonshire, being selected for Midland Development squads, playing for the University of Nottingham 1st XI and captaining the club.

She took a degree in geography at the University of Nottingham (dissertation entitled The Impact of Television on the Cultural Geography of English Cricket, 1995–2000) and then trained in broadcast journalism at Falmouth College of Arts. She gained her first experience of live reporting on cricket, football and rugby at BBC Radio Cornwall before freelancing for BBC Radio Leicester.

== BBC career ==
Mitchell has worked across all BBC networks, including Radio 5 Live, Radio 4, Radio 1, the Asian Network and the World Service, and has presented sport news for the BBC News Channel. She was Britain's first female cricket commentator calling games ball-by-ball.

Mitchell specialises in cricket as part of the Test Match Special team, but she also covers major events for BBC Sport such as the Olympics, Commonwealth Games and Wimbledon. She also presents sport on the Today programme on BBC Radio 4. She spent many years as a sports news presenter for 5 Live, and has also presented the sport for Radio 1's Newsbeat, including a stint on The Chris Moyles Show.

In January 2015, Mitchell took on the role of lead presenter of Stumped, the weekly cricket show on the BBC World Service which is also broadcast on and produced in partnership with All India Radio and ABC Radio Grandstand.

== BBC Radio ==
Mitchell joined the BBC Asian Network as staff in 2002, mainly covering international cricket, and did her first broadcast for Radio 5 Live in 2003.

She has covered England Winter cricket tours to Australia, India, Pakistan, Sri Lanka, New Zealand and South Africa; World Cups in Australia, India and the West Indies; World Twenty20s in Bangladesh 2014, Sri Lanka 2012, West Indies 2010, England 2009 and South Africa 2007, the ICC Champions Trophy, four Women's Cricket World Cups, the 2012 London Olympics, 2008 Beijing Olympics, 2014 Commonwealth Games in Glasgow, 2006 Commonwealth Games in Melbourne, the Wimbledon, the French Open, Australian Open, four World Gymnastics Championships and two World Snooker Championships.

She commentated on Ireland's historic victory over Pakistan at the 2007 Cricket World Cup, and was the last person to interview Pakistan coach Bob Woolmer before his sudden death in the Pegasus Hotel in Jamaica. She reported on his death for all BBC Networks, and was the only BBC reporter in Kingston when police announced a murder investigation.

She made her full England commentary debut at the 2007 World Twenty20 in South Africa with Jonathan Agnew for Test Match Special. She then went to Sri Lanka to commentate on her first ODI series there.

She commentated for both BBC and ABC radio during the England men's ODI tour of Australia in January 2014, working with Jim Maxwell and Kerry O'Keeffe. She also commentated for the ABC at the 2009 Women's Cricket World Cup Final in Sydney, which was won by England.

She was BBC Radio 5 Live's England reporter during the 2011 Cricket World Cup, commentating on a number of World Cup matches for Test Match Special and following India through from the quarter-finals to their eventual triumph in Mumbai.

She has presented a number of 'specials' for BBC Radio 5 Live, including Black Armband: The Full Story.

Mitchell was a boundary commentator at the Oval Test when England regained the Ashes in 2005.

== BBC Television ==
Mitchell has presented sport for the BBC News Channel.

She presented online video diaries from England's winter tour to India in 2008, and The Mitchell Show online video series during the 2009 Ashes.

She made her TV cricket commentary debut in 2007, joining Jonathan Agnew, Sunil Gavaskar and Graham Gooch as part of the commentary team for the ODI between Scotland and India, which was shown live on ESPN and BBC Scotland, produced by Sunset + Vine.

== Work outside the BBC ==
- ESPN Star Sports: Commentator, ICC Women's World Cup 2013, Mumbai. Mitchell commentated alongside Shane Warne at the ICC Women's World T20 Final 2014 in Bangladesh for host broadcaster Star Sports.
- ABC Radio Grandstand: Mitchell became the first woman to call men's cricket ball-by-ball on the ABC in Australia when she joined the team for the third ODI at the SCG in January 2014. She was well-received as a full member of the commentary team for the historic day/night Test match between Australia and New Zealand at the Adelaide Oval in November 2015, and rejoined the ABC for Pakistan's Test series against Australia in 2016–17, the 2017-18 Ashes Test series and the 2018-19 Australia v India and Australia v Sri Lanka series.
- Channel 4: Reporter, London 2012 Paralympics
- Channel 7: Appointed in 2018 as one of the three lead ball-by-ball callers for Men's (all) and Women's (v England) Test Matches.
- Sky Sports: Commentator, Netball Superleague, 2014
- BT Sport: Commentator, WTA Tennis, 2013. Commentator, Ashes Test Series 2017–18. Mitchell became the first female commentator to call an English Test Series on television for a British Home broadcaster.
- Australian Open: Commentator for world feed coverage on Rod Laver Arena and Margaret Court Arena matches.
- ESPNcricinfo: She has hosted the Alison's Tea Break series of interviews on ESPNcricinfo since May 2012. It appears regularly during overseas TV coverage in the tea break of home and away Test matches—for example in May 2013, when she interviewed Tim Southee (prerecorded in Leicestershire and shown on the fourth day of the Lord's Test).

In June 2014 Mitchell hosted the ECB England Cricketer of the Year Awards at Lord's, and was part of the hosting team for the ICC Annual Awards in Sri Lanka.

- In 2018 she joined Channel 5's Cricket on 5 team as Channel 5 announced their plans to cover England Women Cricket Internationals as part of their cricket highlights deal. Alison joined the main commentary team for men's games (replacing Simon Hughes) and fronted the women's highlights

== Writing ==
Mitchell has contributed to The Wisden Cricketer, Wisden Almanack, The Times, Mail on Sunday and The Guardian. She has written for the TMS Blog on the BBC website.
