= Nathan Templeton (journalist) =

Australian journalist (1979–2024)

- Born: Nathan Luke Templeton; 9 May 1979; Geelong, Victoria, Australia
- Died: 9 April 2024 (aged 44); Geelong, Victoria, Australia
- Other names: Tempo
- Education: Deakin University
- Occupation(s): Sunrise Melbourne correspondent Seven Sport reporter
- Years active: 1999–2024
- Employer(s): 10 News First Melbourne (2004–2012); Breakfast (2012); Seven News Melbourne (2012–2016); Seven Sport (2012–2024); Sunrise (2016–2022)
- Spouse: Kate Templeton
- Children: 2

Nathan Luke Templeton (9 May 1979 – 9 April 2024) was an Australian journalist. He was a Seven Sport reporter for over 12 years and was the Melbourne correspondent on the Seven Network's breakfast program, Sunrise.

== Early life and education ==
Born on 9 May 1979 in Geelong, Templeton attended Geelong College for his high school years where he was an accomplished footballer and cricketer representing the school in both the 1st XVIII and 1st XI teams. Following Geelong College, he studied journalism at Deakin University, earning a bachelor's degree in communications.

== Career ==
Early in his career, Templeton worked at Network Ten, where he appeared regularly on the network's Breakfast program and also presented reports for 10 News First in Melbourne.

In June 2012, Templeton moved to the Seven Network to join Seven News Melbourne as a sports reporter. He covered major sporting events including the Australian Open.

In May 2016, Templeton joined Sunrise as its Melbourne correspondent, replacing Rebecca Maddern who moved to the Nine Network. He regularly substituted as sports presenter on both Sunrise and Weekend Sunrise.

Templeton was the poolside interviewer for the Seven Network at both the 2016 Olympic Games at Rio de Janeiro and the 2020 Olympic Games held at Tokyo in 2021, and at the 2018 Commonwealth Games on the Gold Coast.

In November 2022, Templeton stepped down as Sunrise Melbourne correspondent and was replaced by Teegan Dolling. He continued in a behind-the-scenes role with the network until his death in 2024.

A life-long fan of the Geelong Football Club, Templeton was a ground announcer at GMHBA Stadium and emcee for various functions.

== Personal life and death ==
Templeton was married to Kate and had two children.

On 9 April 2024, Templeton was found dead in Zillah Crawcour Park by the Barwon River in the Geelong suburb of Newtown after suffering a medical episode while out walking his dog.
