= Spin TV =

Spin TV is a television production company based in Soho, London, England. It was set up in 2007 by Andy Holland, Ally Mitchell and Bob Workman. The company has produced broadcast shows and pilots. Its sister company is Spin Music. "Spin has produced TV shows and pilot transmissions through a variety of genres."

== History ==
In 2008 Spin TV completed their production of their beginning music series for ITV2, Live at Indigo2. The series starred Paul Weller and The Fratellis.

== Programming ==
- The Enemy. Behind Enemy Lines, which aired on 6 July 2007 (11-minute version) and 6 September 2007 (24-minute version) - Warner Music for Channel 4, was a documentary film on the UK indie rock band The Enemy, including a homecoming performance in Coventry.
- Amy Winehouse. I Told You I Was Trouble was a DVD released on 5 November 2007, Universal Music, on Amy Winehouse's experiences in the United States.
- Mika. Life in Cartoon Motion was a DVD, released on 13 November 2007 by Universal Music, following the singer Mika on a European tour.
- Mika. Live in Paris, was a concert DVD where Mika performed his debut album Life in Cartoon Motion, released on 13 November 2007.
- Sugababes@Indigo02 aired on 30 September 2007, AEG / New Stream Media for FIVE, was a film of the group's performance at IndigO2.
- Debutantes aired in November 2007, TFL for T4. It depicted creative industries professionals mentoring young people in the field.
- The Feeling. Live at Porchester Hall aired on Channel 4, in February 2008, showing the band The Feeling's album launch in Porchester Hall, Bayswater, London. The film was used as part of the band's subsequent DVD.
- Brain Thrust Mastery is a scripted comedy series friends starring Keith Murray and Chris Cain, from the indie-rock band We Are Scientists. It focuses on their lives off-stage, where they hold strange motivational self-help seminars.
- Kaiser Chiefs Vs Kaizer Chiefs was scheduled to air on T4 in 2008. The band Kaiser Chiefs meet their namesakes, the South African football team Kaizer Chiefs. Ricky Wilson, Andrew White, Nick Hodgson, Simon Rix and Nick 'Peanut' Baines travel to Johannesburg to meet the team, and play football with them.

== Spin Music ==
Spin Music provides music for advertising. Their first clients were Coca-Cola and The Sun.
