= Pat Welsh (sports journalist) =

Australian television journalist

- Occupation: Sports journalist
- Employer: Seven News Brisbane

Pat Welsh is a retired Australian sports journalist and reporter. Welsh is currently a sports presenter on Seven News Brisbane.

== Career ==
In 1975, Welsh joined the Seven Network as a sports presenter and reporter. Pat is an Australian sports journalist, commentator, and sports editor.

Welsh is best known for his rugby league and golf commentary and has travelled extensively throughout Europe, Australia, and the United States for the Seven Network. He has covered a wide array of events, including the Bathurst 1000, Melbourne Cup, international rugby league, Summer Olympic Games (Barcelona, Atlanta, Sydney, Athens, Beijing, Rio), and Winter Olympic Games (Nagano, Salt Lake City, Torino).

Welsh began co-hosting the Breakfast with Pat & Heals breakfast program with former Australian cricketer Ian Healy on 7 September 2020, when SEN Track was launched in both North Queensland and South East Queensland. The program was also heard on the new digital station SENQ in 2021. Welsh continued co-hosting the program when 693 SENQ launched on the 693 AM frequency in Brisbane on 1 July 2022, after the Sports Entertainment Network acquired the license of long-running Brisbane music station 4KQ from the Australian Radio Network, a subsidiary of HT&E.

In January 2023, Welsh announced his resignation from the Seven Network after 47 years. Ben Davis replaced him as sports editor.

== Personal life ==
In June 2010, Welsh announced that he was engaged to Cecilynne Jurss.

In July 2013, he was appointed an Ambassador for Alzheimer's Australia (QLD) and a Dementia Australia Ambassador in October 2017.
