= Mark Readings =

Australian sports journalist and commentator

Mark Readings is an Australian sports journalist and commentator. He is formerly a reporter for Seven News and Nine News and also commentates Australian rules football matches on 6PR.

Readings began his career at radio station 6PM in 1988 before joining the Nine Network as a sports reporter, he also commentated on sporting events including domestic cricket, AFL Football and Olympic Games for Nine. From 2010 to 2013, Readings the main weeknight sports presenter replacing Michael Thomson who replace Readings following his departure. In 2014, Readings joined the Seven Network as host of ‘The Footy Fix’ program and in 2015, the main commentator of its WAFL coverage and filled in occasionally as an AFL commentator during Seven's coverage. He also was sports reporter on Today Tonight and was a filled in as sports presenter on Seven News, in 2020 Readings announced his departure from Seven full time and became a freelancer. He hosts 'The Game' program on Seven with ex-West Coast Eagles player Ben Cousins and ex-Fremantle Dockers player Shaun McManus. He also is a contributor on the Backchat podcast with ex-West Coast Eagles player Will Schofield.

In addition to his work on television, he is also a AFL commentator on 6PR also fills in on its Sportsday program with Karl Langdon.

In 2003, Readings received a Logie Award for his coverage of the Bali Bombings on the Nine Network. Readings who was on holidays in Bali when the bombings occurred, reported on the tragedy for Nine News in the days that followed.

He has a wife and twin daughters.

Media offices
Preceded by	Seven News Perth; Sports presenter 2013–2021	Succeeded by N/A
Preceded by Michael Thomson	Nine News Perth; Weeknight sports presenter 2011–2013	Succeeded by Michael Thomson
Preceded by Michael Thomson	Nine News Perth; Weekend sports presenter 2006–2011	Succeeded by Peter Vlahos
