= Bruce McAvaney =

Australian sports broadcaster (born 1953)

Bruce McAvaney OAM
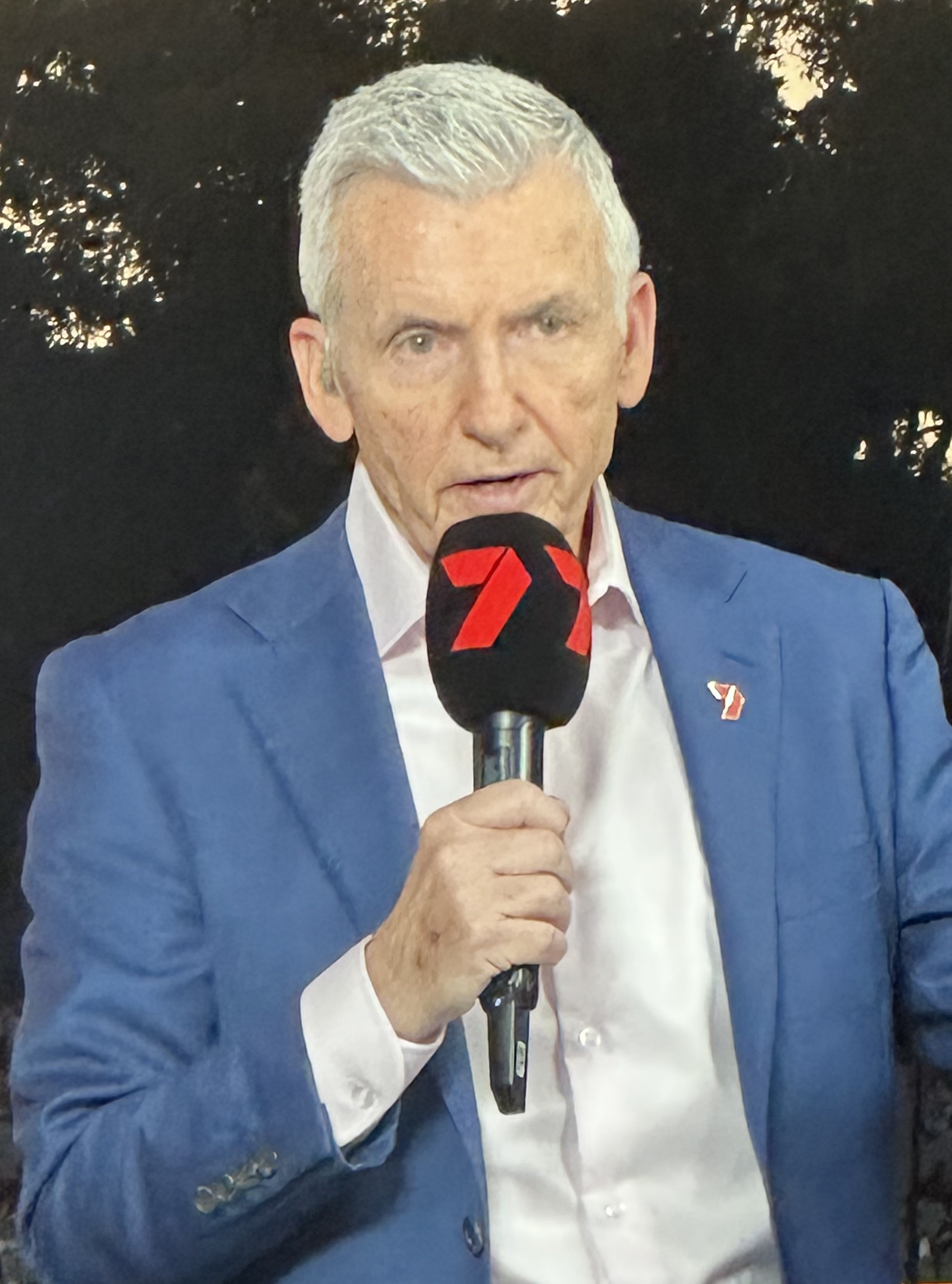
- McAvaney in 2025
- Born: Bruce William McAvaney; 22 June 1953 (age 73); Adelaide, South Australia
- Other names: Mr Olympics, Macca
- Occupation: Sports broadcaster
- Years active: 1976−present
- Employer: Seven Network
- Known for: Broadcasting many sporting events, including: Twelve Summer Olympic Games; Australian Football League (including twenty grand finals); Australian Open; Australian Masters; Bledisloe Cup; Rugby World Cup; Horse racing; Two World Swimming Championships; IAAF World Championships in Athletics; Melbourne Cup; Test cricket; Winter Olympics
- Children: 2

Bruce William McAvaney OAM (born 22 June 1953) is an Australian sports broadcaster with the Seven Network. McAvaney has presented high-profile events including the AFL Grand Final, Melbourne Cup, Australian Open, Test cricket and both Winter and Summer Olympics, as well as annual special events such as the Brownlow Medal. McAvaney is well known for his commentary of AFL matches as well as covering every Summer Olympic Games from the Los Angeles 1984 Summer Olympic Games to the Paris 2024 Summer Olympic Games.

== Early years ==
McAvaney was born in 1953, the son of an Adelaide accountant, and developed an early interest in sport and race calling. After attending Woodville High School (and failing Years 10 and 12) he spent five years as a Telecom clerk (renamed Telstra after his departure). Then in 1976 during a sickie, McAvaney travelled to Kilmore, Victoria, to bet on some races. There, he met Kevin Hillier, an Adelaide race caller, who suggested McAvaney help him out back in Adelaide. This launched his career in the sports media, joining Adelaide radio station 5DN, calling horse races and later hosting a sports show.

== Television career ==
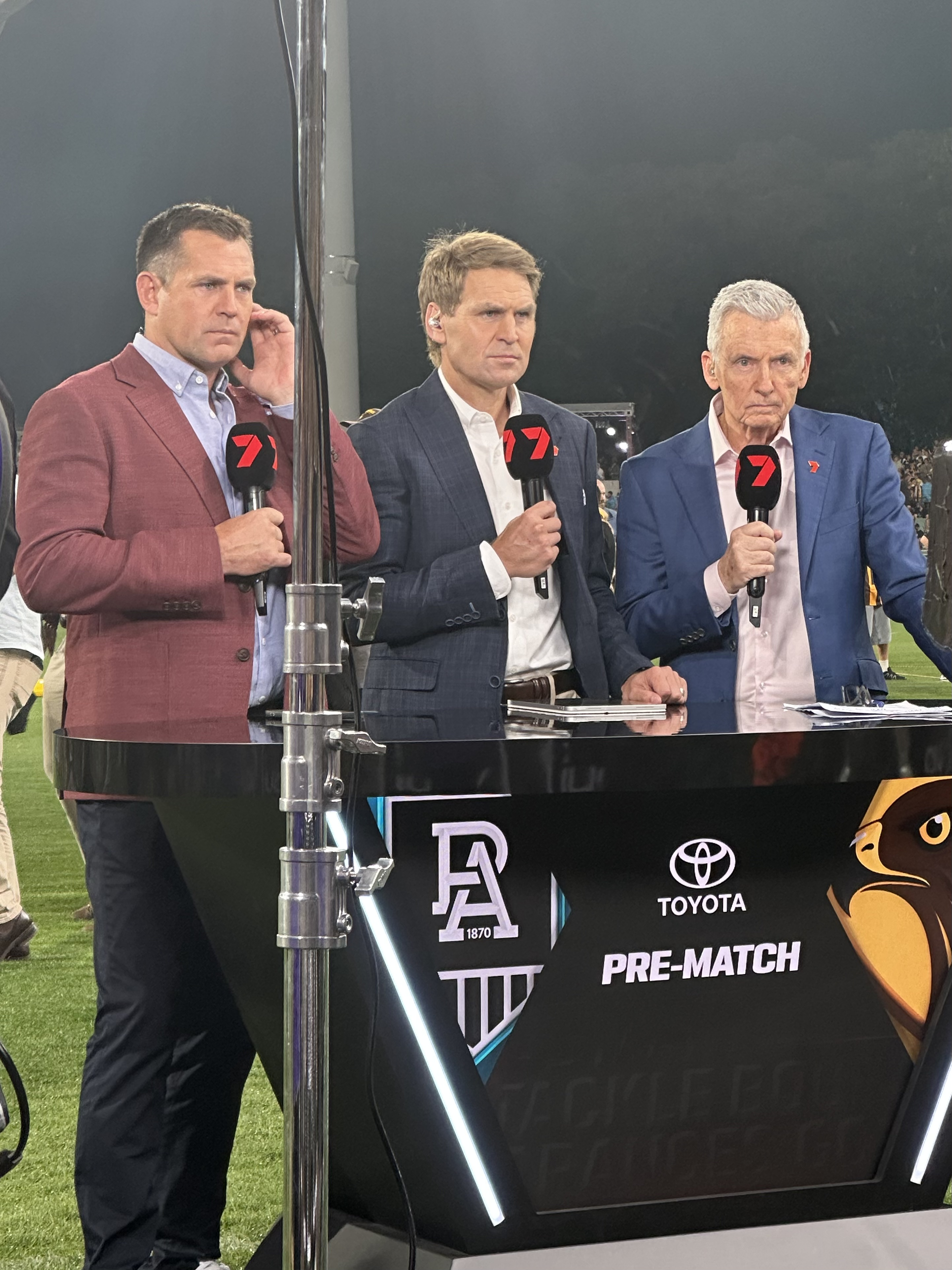
McAvaney with Luke Hodge and Kane Cornes during Seven's coverage of the 2025 AFL season

McAvaney moved to television in 1978, when he joined Adelaide station ADS-7 to read sport news and produce the weekly Racetrack program. His career received a boost when colleague Sandy Roberts covered the 1980 Moscow Olympics for Seven, and McAvaney was chosen to host the Adelaide end of the telecast for the station.

From 1981 until 1983, McAvaney was the chief sports presenter for Seven News in Adelaide. He was also the lead commentator for Seven's telecasts of the South Australian National Football League competition, calling the 1983 SANFL Grand Final with former player Robert Oatey. He also hosted the league's Magarey Medal telecasts.

In late 1983, he moved to Melbourne and joined Ten Melbourne to read sport news. The following year he was the secondary host and commentated track and field events at the 1984 Los Angeles Olympics for the Ten Network.

Between 1985 and 1988, McAvaney also called the Melbourne Cup and hosted various major sporting telecasts for Ten, including the 1986 Edinburgh Commonwealth Games, the 1987 World Athletics Championships in Rome and the 1988 IAAF Grand Prix in Berlin. McAvaney went on to co-host Ten's telecast of the 1988 Seoul Olympics, a role which won him significant acclaim.

In 1989, McAvaney negotiated a two-year premature end to his contract with Ten, and returned to the Seven Network on the condition that he could cover the 1992 Olympics.

Since his return to Seven, McAvaney has hosted and called a broad range of the network's sports coverage, including the Melbourne Cup, World Athletics Championships, Motor Racing, the Australian Open Tennis, Australian Masters Golf and all Summer Olympic Games from Barcelona 1992 to the 2020 Summer Olympics. His extensive history covering Olympic Games has led to the nickname "Mr Olympics".

In an interview with the Herald Sun, McAvaney announced informally that he would no longer commentate Men's games at the Australian Open so that he could optimise his health over summer and for other sport events. McAvaney had been calling the Australian Open since 1990 and been chief caller alongside Jim Courier since 2005. 2017 was only the second time he had missed the tournament, attributing that later to his cancer diagnosis.

McAvaney was the MC of the Brownlow Medal for over two decades (though at different time periods), between 1990 and 2018.

Since 2018, McAvaney has hosted Seven's coverage of Test cricket, interviewing some of cricket's most interesting figures in the lunch breaks of the Melbourne and Sydney Tests.

In February 2021, McAvaney announced that he was retiring from calling AFL games because of a desire to reduce his workload.

In July 2024, the Australian Broadcasting Corporation announced McAvaney would be joining its Paris Olympics commentary team on ABC Radio stations.

In April 2025, SBS Sport announced McAvaney would lead its coverage of the 2025 World Athletics Championships.

=== Self-reflective highlights ===
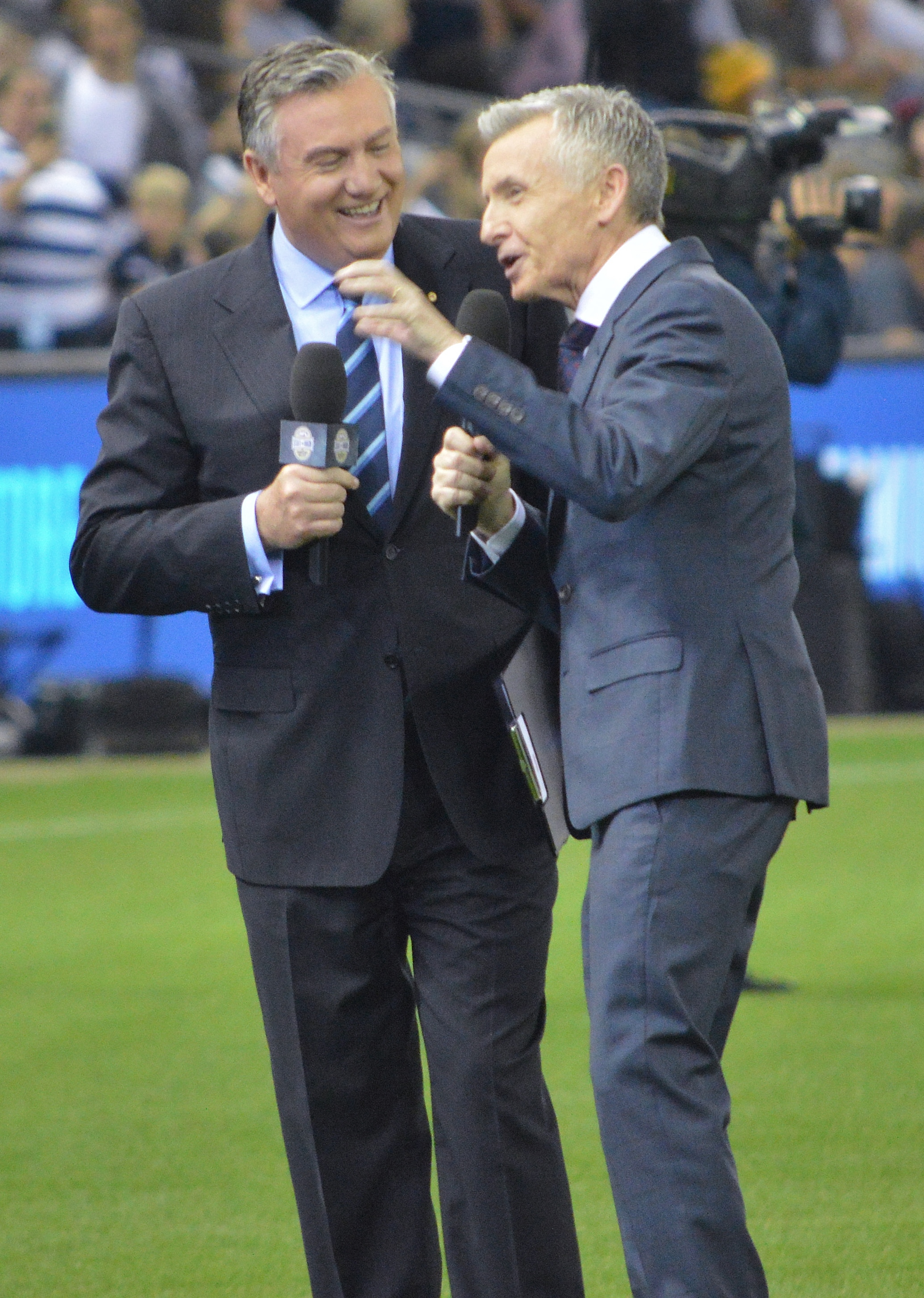
McAvaney with co-host Eddie McGuire ahead of the 2020 AFL State of Origin.

When asked between 2018 and 2024 to ponder the greatest and most memorable calls of his career, according to his own estimation, McAvaney has specifically cited—in addition to his various callings of AFL grand finals, specifically highlighting the 2016 AFL Grand Final as his favourite Australian rules football call, his last co-commentary duty with Dennis Cometti—his calling of Cathy Freeman's gold medal in the 400 metres at the 2000 Olympics, Winx's third Cox Plate, Usain Bolt's multiple performances at the 2008 Olympics, Carl Lewis's win at the 1991 World Championships and 1992 Olympics, and Makybe Diva's history-making third-consecutive Melbourne Cup victory. Ultimately, McAvaney said on multiple occasions over this period that Freeman's 2000 victory was "probably the most important of my life as a caller ... and to be a tiny part of that is an incredible privilege".

== Awards ==
McAvaney was awarded a Medal of the Order of Australia (OAM) in June 2002 for service to sports broadcasting, and to the community through charitable and sporting organisations. He was also inducted into the Sport Australia Hall of Fame in that year.

In 2022, he was inducted into the TV Week Logie Hall of Fame, becoming the second sports broadcaster to be inducted.

In June 2023, McAvaney was inducted into the Australian Football Hall of Fame. He is the eleventh media personality to be inducted into the code's Hall of Fame.

In September 2025, McAvaney was awarded a Veteran Pin from World Athletics.

== Personal life ==
McAvaney's first marriage, to Merry, lasted from 1983 to 1991. He met his second wife Anne Johnson, a television journalist and producer, in 1993 while making the show Seasons. With her, he has two children, Sam (born 1994) and Alexandra (born 1997). He moved his family from Melbourne back to his hometown of Adelaide in 1999.

In March 2017, McAvaney revealed he had been diagnosed with chronic lymphocytic leukaemia.
