= Jason Richardson (sports personality) =

Australian sprinter & radio presenter (born 1969)

Jason Richardson (born 23 June 1969) is a television presenter and commentator and former Australian athlete. In 1993, he won the Stawell Gift off the mark of 7.5 metres.

== Athletics career ==
Richardson won the 1992 'novice' 100m at Stawell, and followed his Gift win in 1993 with a win in the backmarkers 120m invitation in 1994 - one of only two athletes in the history of the Stawell Gift to win all three in successive years.

His professional running career wins also include the 1996 British Professional 200m championship, plus wins in the Prahran & Smithton Gifts. He has also been placed in Australia's two other major Classic Gifts - the Bay Sheffield (SA) and Burnie Gift (Tas).

== Radio career ==
He is a radio personality on Melbourne sports radio station SEN 1116. Nicknamed "Richo", Jason is considered by those who know him to be "full of energy and raring to go". He hosts the morning timeslots on the weekends, and also is a fill-in Morning Glory host during summer seasons.

Hosted "On The Rise" on SEN on Sunday mornings from 8am to 10am for many years with Damien Fleming, Daniel Harford, Dr Turf, Mark Allen & Nathan Thompson.

He currently hosts Saturday mornings "Racing Fix" shows, and can be heard during the week as a regular co-host on SEN's afternoon program Harf Time with Daniel Harford, including the "Casual Friday" program. Co-hosts "Richo off to the Races" with Kevin Bartlett on Friday mornings.

== TV career ==
Reporter on Channel 10's Inside Sport TV in 2001.

Currently he hosts live coverage of horse racing meetings around Victoria on Racing.com, which can be seen on Foxtel #529. Also, he hosts the "Spending Time With" in-depth interview program for TVN, plus weekly preview program "Get On" on Thursday evenings.

Presenter on Channel 7's coverage of the 2010, 2011 & 2012 Autumn & Spring Racing Carnivals in Melbourne and Sydney, featuring Caulfield Cup & WS Cox Plate meetings.

He also appeared in a National Heart Foundation Heart Health TV commercial in the 1990s. Also host commentator of Seven's BBL coverage.

== Personal life ==
He is married to 1998 Commonwealth Games 5000m Gold medallist Kate Anderson. Kate represented Australia in the 5000m at the 1996 Atlanta and 2000 Sydney Olympic Games. Together they have three daughters: Ruby, Milla and Cleo.
