= John Casey (commentator) =

Australian sports journalist and broadcaster

- Born: 30 June 1964 (age 62); Broken Hill, New South Wales, Australia
- Occupations: Journalist and sports broadcaster

John Christopher Casey (born 30 June 1964) is an Australian journalist and sports broadcaster. He has had a notable career as a play-by-play commentator for the National Basketball League (NBL).

== Early life and education ==
Casey was born in the mining town of Broken Hill, New South Wales. He was educated at Burke Ward Primary School and Broken Hill High School, earning the vice-presidency of the Student Representative Council at the latter institution. He led the school band, was an athletics champion, and helped New South Wales win a national schoolboys Australian football title in the 1979 Shell Cup.

== Career ==
Casey started writing for the Barrier Daily Truth newspaper as an 18-year-old in 1981 and upon completion of his cadetship moved to Melbourne and joined The Sun News-Pictorial where, as a general news reporter, he wrote numerous front-page stories.

In 1985, Casey joined The News in Adelaide as a sports journalist and combined this role with duties for the Sunday Mail where he was chief racing sub-editor.

After seven years service with newspapers in three states, Casey began his television career as an on-camera sports presenter with SAS-10 (later to become SAS-7). As well as reading the weekend sports news, he served as a commentator on national tennis telecasts and National Basketball League (NBL) games. During this time, he also presented sports breaks for radio stations 5KA and 5AA.

In 1990–91, Casey became the first ever sports journalist contracted to Channel 7's London bureau and covered events such as Wimbledon tennis, British Open golf at St Andrews, FA Cup Finals, Prix de l'Arc de Triomphe at Longchamp, Formula One and Susie Maroney's epic English Channel swim.

On his return to Australia in 1992, Casey moved to Sydney and took up a position as senior reporter with Channel 7's national prime time sports program "Seasons" while also reading news on 11AM and the weekend sports breaks for ATN-7. He was named "Best Sportscaster" in the 1992 Better Hearing Australia Clear Speech Awards. He later covered the 1993 FIFA World Cup qualifier in Argentina and the 1994 Commonwealth Games in Canada.

Having gathered experience with Sky Television and British Satellite Broadcasting in London, Casey was recruited to help launch pay television in Australia (Galaxy), which debuted in 1995 with the Premier Sports Network.

From 1995 to 2008, Casey was the senior commentator with Fox Sports Australia, commentating on some of the world's biggest sporting events including the Olympic Games, Wimbledon tennis and golf's major tournaments along with AFL, NRL and a host of other national events. He has also hosted studio shows for Fox Sports, including Main Game and The Back Page.

Casey worked briefly for the Sunraysia Daily in Mildura, Victoria, in 2010, before returning to his hometown of Broken Hill to take on the role of general manager and Managing Editor of the Barrier Daily Truth.

=== NBL ===
In 1987, Casey began his television career in the Channel 7 newsroom in Adelaide in the sports department. Channel 7 had the rights to the NBL at the time and he started doing the sideline commentary at Apollo Stadium. The 2023–24 NBL season marked his 37th year commentating the NBL.

In January 2024, Casey called his 1000th career basketball game.

== Personal life ==
Casey and his wife, Kylie, have three children.

In 1991, Casey was elected councillor for Albert Park Ward of Woodville City Council, South Australia.
