= Sandy Roberts =

Australian television sport presenter (born 1950)

Sandy Roberts OAM
- Born: 22 February 1950 (age 76); Lucindale, South Australia, Australia
- Occupations: Sport presenter & commentator
- Years active: 1971–2019
- Employer(s): Fox Footy and Crocmedia

Sandy Roberts (born 22 February 1950) is an Australian veteran sports presenter and commentator formerly working on television for Fox Sports Australia and radio with Crocmedia. He was a long-time personality of the Seven Network for four decades, notably part of the Seven Sport Olympics coverage as a host for more than 20 years. NBL too, around 1989.

== Career ==
Roberts' career started at Perth radio station 6PM, after a short stint as a copyboy for the Adelaide News. Roberts then travelled extensively throughout Europe for two years, before returning to Australia, where he joined Radio 3CS Colac as an announcer. In 1971, he switched to television station BCV8-TV in Bendigo as a news presenter. He later joined the Seven Network in Adelaide in 1973 as a general announcer and presenter.

In 1980, Roberts was asked to be one of the commentators for the 1980 Moscow Olympics telecast after which Roberts moved to Melbourne to work for the Seven Network in Melbourne.

In his time with the Seven Network, Roberts commentated over 700 Australian Football League (AFL) games. Roberts also commentated on NBL games, the Australian Open, the Spring Racing Carnival and many major golf tournaments. He has also been involved in the coverage of every Summer Olympic Games from Moscow 1980 to Beijing 2008, including Sydney 2000, as well as many Winter Olympic Games.

Roberts hosted the Seven Network's Bathurst 1000 coverage four times: in 1991, 1993, 1994 and the 1997 Super Touring 1000.

Alongside Dennis Cometti, Roberts was a commentator during the famous AFL match between Sydney and St Kilda in 1993 in which a pig was released onto the ground by a Sydney member with a number 4 and the nickname "Pluga" spray-painted onto it (in reference to then St Kilda player Tony Lockett). Roberts became famous for his call of the incident, exclaiming: "There's a pig at full-forward!".

In January 2005, Roberts joined Seven News Melbourne after Beverley O'Connor resigned.

Outside of sports broadcasting, Roberts was an annual contributor to Seven's telecast of the Good Friday Appeal and also hosted the game shows It's Academic and The $1,000,000 Chance of a Lifetime.

Despite this impressive résumé, Roberts is often remembered for his gaffe in introducing the 1981 Miss Australia, Leanne Dick as "Leanne Cock" during a Mount Gambier Cup meeting. (Ironically, Dick's surname after marriage is Cockerill).

In early February 2013, Roberts was the subject of media speculation that he was leaving the Seven Network to work at another channel, Fox Footy. In November 2013, Roberts confirmed that he would be leaving the Seven Network after 40 years with Seven in Melbourne and Adelaide to work at Fox Footy as a host-commentator. Tim Watson took Roberts' place as the weekday sports newsreader. Roberts last day reading sport news was Friday 29 November 2013, and he finished his hosting duties for Seven at the Australian Open golf tournament on Sunday 1 December 2013. Roberts retired from television in 2018.

Roberts was awarded the Medal of the Order of Australia in the 2024 King's Birthday Honours for "service to media as a sports commentator".

== Personal life ==
Roberts grew up on a sheep farm in Lucindale, South Australia.

Roberts is married to Carolyn, a former Vice President of international sports management company IMG, and they have a son, Angus. A previous marriage broke down following the death of a 15-year-old son from that marriage. He also has another son from his first marriage, Ben. Ben is married to Jane, and they have three daughters.

In May 2023, Roberts stated that he was diagnosed with the blood cancer multiple myeloma in May 2022. He is now an ambassador for Myeloma Australia.

== Community work ==
In addition to his ambassadorship for Myeloma Australia, Roberts has, since July 2013, been an ambassador for the non-profit organisation The Beehive Foundation, a charity that runs free programs to develop resilience and coping mechanisms for youth via junior sporting organisations.
