= C7 Sport =

- C7 Sport Logo
- Country: Australia

Programming
- Language: English
- Picture format: 576i (SDTV)

Ownership
- Owner: Seven West Media
- Sister channels: C7 Twelve; C7 Thirteen

History
- Launched: 19 September 1995
- Closed: 7 May 2002
- Replaced by: Fox Sports (Austar); Fox Footy Channel (Optus)
- Former names: Sport Australia (September 1995 – March 1999)

C7 Sport was a pay-TV service in Australia, owned and run by Seven Network. The service was carried on the Austar and Optus Vision pay-TV networks between 1995 and 2002. Seven unsuccessfully pursued court action against competitors, seeking damages of $480 million, but lost the case and was described by the judge as exhibiting "more than a hint of hypocrisy" in regard to the issue of price-ramping of broadcast rights.

== Early history ==
When Optus Vision launched in 1995, it carried two sports channels: Sports Australia, and Sports AFL (which showed Australian Football League games.) These channels were run by a company called Sports Vision, in which Seven Network was a partner. A third channel, Sports Australia 2, was added during the 1996 Atlanta Olympics, and later used to show additional live programming.

The programming line-up on the Sports Australia service rivalled Fox Sports, with the AFL, NRL premiership, the Australian National Soccer League, the FA Premier League, and Sheffield Shield cricket. At the time, Fox Sports focused on less popular sports.

== Seven's involvement ==
In 1997 Sports Vision ran into financial difficulty; Sports Australia struggled to get viewers due to the limited reach of the Optus cable, and aggressive marketing of the Fox Sports service by Foxtel. The company eventually collapsed, but the Seven Network bought the channels and relaunched them on 1 March 1999 under the C7 Sport brand. Sports Australia became "C7 Gold", or "C7 Twelve", after its channel assignment on Optus. Sports Australia 2 became "C7 Blue", or "C7 Thirteen". Sports AFL's programming was carried on the other two channels.

Shortly afterwards, Seven signed a deal with Austar that saw C7 become available to most of regional Australia from April. Austar had many more subscribers than Optus at the time. Before the deal, C7 had only been available in the small Optus cabled areas in Sydney, Melbourne and Brisbane. C7 was never available to the majority of people in the capital cities (except Hobart and Darwin).

== Olympics coverage ==
C7 continued to lose programming to Fox Sports; after the Super League war in 1997, C7 no longer had exclusive rights to NRL games, having to share them with Fox, and had totally lost the rights to the FA Premier League.

C7 began negotiations with Foxtel in order to make the channels available to a wider audience, but Foxtel refused to carry them. Foxtel claimed that C7 was an inferior service, for which Seven wanted an exorbitant price. C7 won two Federal Court actions backing their position, but Foxtel claims it acted in accordance with the Court's rulings. Seven won the right to put its programming on Foxtel's analog cable system, including its set-top boxes.

C7 still had the AFL and, crucially, had the rights to the 2000 Sydney Olympics. Two more channels ("C7 Olympic" and "C7 Games") were set up, which would carry non-stop Olympic programming during the Games; the channels being made available to Austar and Optus customers at additional cost. Foxtel and C7 negotiated access to Games content for Foxtel viewers.

C7 was later forced to give refunds to some customers after the Australian Competition and Consumer Commission ruled that they had misrepresented the C7 Olympic service by advertising that the service would carry all Australian men's and women's basketball games.

== Litigation ==
Early in 2001, Seven lost the rights to the AFL to a News Corp Australia headed consortium also containing PBL, Nine Network, Network Ten and Telstra. The new rights deal, which started with the 2002 season, saw Nine and Ten carry games on free-to-air, and a new service, Fox Footy Channel, launched on Foxtel.

C7 continued to provide its service to Optus and Austar, but its programming lineup near the end of its run was extremely weak. C7 was reduced to showing XFL games (on several weeks' delay) and live woodchopping in prime time. Optus dropped the channel in late March, replacing it with Fox Sports. Soon after Austar replaced it with the Fox Footy Channel. With no carrier, the channel was officially closed on 7 May.

Later that year, Seven launched what is considered to be the largest-ever media lawsuit in Australia, naming 22 defendants including Nine, Ten, Optus, Austar, the AFL, the NRL, Fox Sports, PBL and Telstra.

=== Claim ===
Seven's principal claims, relying on anti-competitive provisions in Part IV of the Trade Practices Act, were that:

- Foxtel denied C7 access to Telstra's cable network and Foxtel's STBs in order to weaken C7's position when negotiating television deals with the AFL and NRL;
- One or more of the named defendants acted illegally to collude in the marketplace and use their combined market power to prevent competition;
- Foxtel's owners (Telstra, News Corporation and PBL) signed an agreement in late-1999 to ensure Foxtel gained the AFL and NRL rights.
- Optus's undertaking to carry Fox Sports was a breach of an 'exclusive' contract it had with Seven for provision of sports programming.

Seven claimed damages of A$480 million (amended from the original A$1.1 billion). Soon after the case began, the suits against Network Ten and the AFL were settled in the Federal Court.

=== Attempt to harm soccer ===
During the trial it was revealed that C7 had purchased the rights to National Soccer League content with the intention of "suffocating" coverage of the sport to benefit the AFL (i.e., Australian rules football). This was evidenced by an email from C7 to the AFL complaining about the AFL's ingratitude.

=== Judgment ===
The judgment was handed down on 27 July 2007 and telecast live by the ABC, Sky News (owned in part by the Seven Media Group and PBL), Yahoo7, the Sydney Morning Herald website and ABC Online.

C7 lost the case conclusively on most points with Justice Sackville declaring that, based upon the anti-competitive provisions of the Trade Practices Act upon which Seven relied, the case could not succeed. In a key point, he explained that "the reason is that even if each of the consortium respondents had the objective attributed to it by Seven—that of killing C7—achieving that objective could not have substantially lessened competition in the retail television market."

Justice Sackville labelled Seven as "far from a helpless and innocent victim", being "the author of its own misfortune" and stating "there is more than a hint of hypocrisy in certain of Seven's contentions." He was unable to accept Seven's chairman Kerry Stokes as a reliable witness.

The judge also commented on the hefty financial cost of the case, remarking that "in my view, the expenditure of $200 million and counting on a single piece of litigation is not only extraordinarily wasteful, but borders on the scandalous". The case has continually been labelled by both the legal and media sectors as one of the most extreme examples of "mega-litigation".

=== Costs hearing ===
In costs documents lodged on 27 August 2007, the NRL, one of the defendants in the case, argued for an indemnity costs order, the actual costs incurred by the parties, to be awarded against Seven, with the figure estimated at $200 million.

On 14 September 2007, Seven agreed to a A$23.5-million costs settlement with News Limited, the Australian Football League, the National Rugby League, Channel Ten and pay-TV group Austar.

=== Appeal ===
In December 2009, Seven lost an appeal against the court's decision. "The appeal court said the Seven Network had failed to establish that there was any 'anti-competitive purpose' in the business dealings of the respondents in the retail TV market".
