= ABC Sport =

Sports programming from the Australian Broadcasting Corporation

- Logo used since 2020
- Australia
- Frequencies: DAB+ and online

Programming
- Language: English
- Network: ABC Radio; ABC News

Ownership
- Owner: Australian Broadcasting Corporation

History
- First air date: 1990
- Former names: ABC Radio Grandstand

Links
- Website: www.abc.net.au/news/sport/audio

ABC Sport is the division of the Australian Broadcasting Corporation that delivers sports programming to their television, radio and online networks. ABC Sport is also a digital radio station and a programming block simulcast on ABC radio stations. It broadcasts mainly commentary, news and talkback programs.

== History ==
ABC Radio Grandstand was first launched as a programming block in 1990, though the ABC had been broadcasting cricket commentary since the 1930s. The digital station was launched on 5 October 2011 as ABC Radio Grandstand. The brand was renamed to ABC Sport in November 2020, stylised in all caps.

== Radio coverage ==
Sports that have been covered by the station include football matches such as A-League Men, A-League Women, Socceroos, Matildas, friendlies and other special events. The ABC has done all forms of cricket including Twenty20, Test and One Day International. As well as the Olympic Games (both summer and winter), Commonwealth Games, Australian Open tennis, golf, basketball, rugby league and australian rules. They are the only national Australian radio station to broadcast sporting events live.

== Television coverage ==
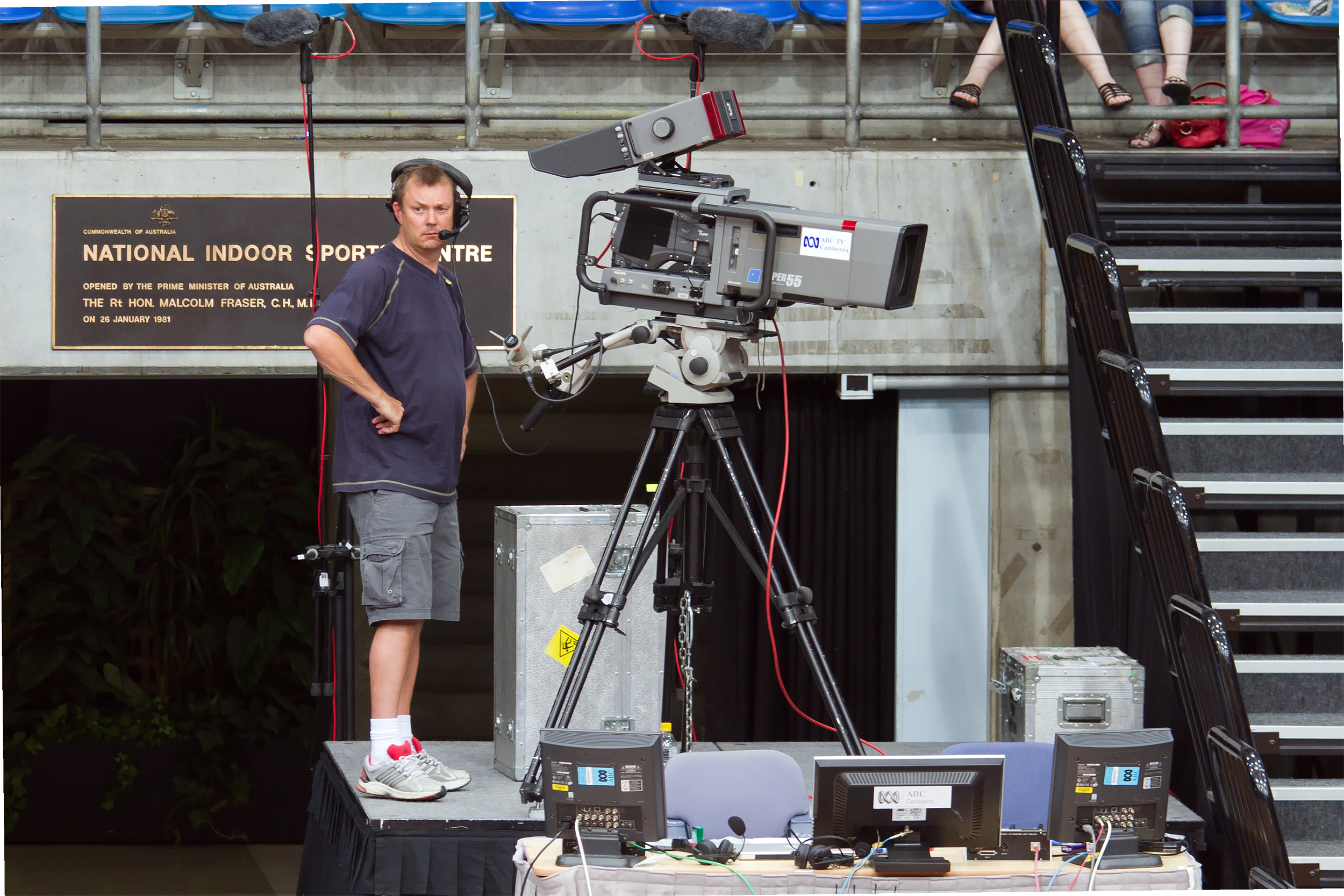
ABC camera man filming a WNBL game

The program Offsiders is broadcast on ABC TV on Sunday mornings, with a panel reviewing and debating the previous week's action. That Pacific Sports Show also focuses on the achievements of Pacific Island athletes around the world.

=== Television broadcast rights ===
==== Current ====
List of current broadcast rights held by the ABC
Sport	Event	Broadcast partner(s)	Date	Notes
Australian rules	Victorian Football League	AFL.com.au	1987–2014, 2026–present	

==== Past ====
List of expired broadcast rights held by the ABC
Sport	Event	Broadcast partner(s)	Date
Summer Olympics	Melbourne 1956, Rome 1960, Tokyo 1964, Mexico 1968, Munich 1972, Montreal 1976	Seven (1956, 1972, 1976); Ten (1968); Nine (1956, 1972, 1976)	1956, 1960, 1964, 1968, 1972, 1976
American football	National Football League		1980s–1990s
American football	Super Bowl		1980s–1990s
Association football	A-League	Fox Sports	2013–2017 (ABC Radio), 2019–2021
Association football	Matildas Internationals	Fox Sports, SBS (2019–2021)	2008–2016, 2019–2021
Association football	Socceroos Internationals	Fox Sports, SBS (2019–2021)	2014–2015, 2019–2021
Association football	W-League	Fox Sports	2008–2016, 2019–2021
Association football	FIFA World Cup	Seven Network (1974), SBS (1982)	1974–1982
Association football	English Premier League		1970s–1990s
Association football	National Soccer League	C7 Sport	2001
Association football	AFC Asian Cup	Fox Sports	2015
Association football	FA Cup		1970s–1990s
Association football	Sydney FC v Liverpool FC Match		2017
Australian rules	Australian Football League	Seven Network HSV7 (1957–1986), Nine Network GTV9 Melbourne (1957–1986), Network 10 TEN10 Sydney (1987), TVQ10 Brisbane (1987)	1957–1987
Australian rules	North East Australian Football League		2007–2014
Australian rules	Northern Territory Football League		2005–2014
Australian rules	South Australian National Football League		1988–2014
Australian rules	Tasmanian State League		2009–2014
Australian rules	West Australian Football League	TVW7 (1963–1987)	1987–2014
Baseball	Australian Baseball League	Network Ten (1990s–1996)	1989–1999
Baseball	Claxton Shield		1970s–1988
Basketball	FIBA Men's World Cup		2014
Basketball	FIBA Women's World Cup		2014
Basketball	FIBA Oceania Championship for Men		2013
Basketball	FIBA Oceania Championship for Women		2013
Basketball	National Basketball Association		1983–1991
Basketball	Women's National Basketball Association		1991–1999
Basketball	National Basketball League	Fox Sports	1979–2001, 2017–2018
Basketball	Women's National Basketball League	Fox Sports	1981–2015, 2020–2022
Commonwealth Games	Cardiff 1958, Perth 1962, Kingston 1966, Edinburgh 1970, Christchurch 1974, Edmonton 1978, Brisbane 1982, Edinburgh 1986	Nine (1982), Network Ten (1986)	1958, 1962, 1966, 1970, 1974, 1978, 1982, 1986
Cricket	Sheffield Shield		1970s–1990s
Cricket	Test cricket	Nine Network	1960s–1979
Cricket	Women's Twenty20 International		2012
Field hockey	Hockey World Cup		2014
Golf	Australian Ladies Masters		2017
Golf	British Open		1970s–1980s
Golf	PGA Tour		2019
Golf	Women's Australian Open Golf		2021
Lawn bowls	Domestic and International Australian Lawn Bowls		1981–2011
Netball	Commonwealth Bank Trophy	C7 Sport (1997–2002)	1997–2007
Netball	INF Netball World Cup		1991, 1995, 2003, 2007
Netball	Netball Test Series		1990s–2007
Paralympic Games	Paralympic Games		1970s–2013
Rugby league	NSWRL/ARL Premiership now National Rugby League	Seven ATN7 1971–1982 0-10 Network 1973–1979 Network 10 1980–1991 Nine Network 1961–1972, 1983, 1992–1995	1961–1995
Rugby league	Australia national rugby league team	Nine 1957–1977, Seven ATN7 1978–1982, 0-10 Network 1979, Network 10 1980	1957–1982
Rugby league	1986 Kangaroo tour of Great Britain and France, 1990 Kangaroo tour of Great Britain and France French leg	Network 10 British leg	1986, 1990
Rugby league	Queensland Cup	Fox Sports	1996–2012
Rugby union	Australia national rugby union team		1957–1991
Rugby union	Rugby World Cup		1987, 1991
Rugby union	British and Irish Lions in Australia		1959, 1966, 1989
Rugby union	Shute Shield		1996–2014
Tennis	Hopman Cup		1995–2010

== Commentators ==
- Jim Maxwell – A highly experienced and highly regarded cricket commentator, Maxwell has covered Australian One Day, Test, and World Cup matches. He also has broadcast rugby union, rugby league, golf, and hockey, and the Olympic Games.
- Ian Chappell – Former captain of Australia. He has played over 90 Test and One Day cricket matches for Australia and has a Test batting average of 42.42.
- Alison Mitchell – Commentator of the Seven Network's cricket coverage since 2018, first joined the ABC in 2014. She has also covered the Olympic Games, Commonwealth Games and four Women's Cricket World Cups.
- Simone Thurtell – Best known for her Grandstand Active Show, which featured regular guests, including Kerry O'Keeffe, Geoff Huegill and Al Baxter, and covered the sporting issues of the day, overnight scores and live crosses to sport. She covered major events such as the 2000 Sydney Olympics and 2006 Commonwealth Games in New Delhi.
- Corbin Middlemas
- Matt Clinch
- Ben Cameron
- Kelli Underwood
- Andrew Mayes
- Joel Peterson
- Lauren Bordin
- Brett Sprigg (NSW)
- Daniel Garb (NSW)
- Quentin Hull (NSW, QLD)
- Michael Price (QLD)
- Aaron Bryans (SA)
- Neil Cross (SA)
- Clint Wheeldon (WA)
- Mitch Turner (WA)
- Chris Rowbottam (TAS)
- Michael Maney (TAS)
- Rob Cross (NT)

== See also ==
- Seven Sport
- Nine's Wide World of Sports
- 10 Sport
- SBS Sport
- Fox Sports (Australia)
- Stan Sport
- beIN Sports (Australia)
- Paramount+ Sports
