= Simon Marshall (jockey) =

Australian jockey

Simon Marshall is an Australian former jockey and media personality.

He often appears in the media as part of horse-racing functions, and once hosted a radio show on SEN 1116 with Tony Jones. He also appeared as a reporter for Seven Network's AFL GameDay program. Marshall wrote a biography, Hold ya Horses – laughs, highs and Wild times of Simon Marshall.
