= List of Australian Football League television shows =

This is a list of AFL shows which have aired on Australian television, as of 2011.

== AFL Game Day ==
Channel: Seven Network
Years: 2008–2020
Airs: Sunday @ 10:00am
Duration: 60 minutes

=== Current Cast ===
- Hamish McLachlan (Host, 2008–present)
- Tom Harley (Panellist, 2010—present)
- Matthew Richardson (Panellist, 2010—present)
- Mark Robinson (Panellist, ?–Present)

== AFL Game Day: Primetime ==
Seven Network
Hosted by Hamish McLachlan, with Tom Harley, Matthew Richardson, Ben Cousins and Jason Akermanis

== AFL Lovematch ==
Fox Footy Channel

== AFL Squadron ==
Seven Network
Hosted by Garry Lyon

== AFL Teams ==
Fox Sports Australia

== AFL Today ==
Seven Network, early 1990s
Hosted by Bruce McAvaney, with Scott Palmer

== Any Given Sunday ==
Channel: Nine Network
Years: 2005–2006
Aired: Sunday @ 1:00pm
Duration: 60 minutes

=== Season 1 Cast ===
- Garry Lyon (co-host, 2005)
- James Brayshaw (co-host, 2005)
- Sam Newman (co-host, 2005)

=== Season 2 Cast ===
- Mick Molloy (co-host, 2006)
- Nicole Livingstone (co-host, 2006)
- Dermott Brereton (co-host, 2006)

== Before the Bounce ==
(Fox Sports Australia)

== Before the Game ==
Originally named After the Game in 2003

Channel: Network Ten
Years: 2003–2013
Airs: Thursday @ 8:30pm (Originally Saturday @ 6.30pm and 11:30pm)
Duration: 60 minutes / 30 minutes

=== Current Cast ===
- Dave Hughes (Panellist, 2003—2013)
- Samantha Lane (Panellist, 2003—2012)
- Andrew Maher (Host, 2005–2013)
- Lehmo (Panellist, 2005—2013)
- Mick Molloy (Panellist, 2008–2013)
- Ryan Fitzgerald (Live reporter, ?—2012)

=== Former Cast ===
- Peter Helliar (Host/Panellist, 2003–2007)
- Damian Callinan (Panellist, 2003–2004)
- Eloise Southby (Panellist, 2003)
- Anthony Hudson (Host, 2004)

=== Current Segments ===
- Tool of the Week
- Player of the Day
- Newspaper Headlines
- Inside 60

=== Former Segments ===
- Diary of a Footballer
- Jumping in Hot Water
- "Strauchanie"
- Lehmo's Footy Clinic
- Make a Wish Foundation

== Beyond the Boundary ==
(Network Ten)
Hosted by Christi Malthouse

== The Big League ==
Hosted by Peter Landy

== The Bounce ==
(Seven Network)

== The Business End ==
Herald Sun web series
Years: 2011–present
Airs: Saturday @ 7:00pm
Duration: 21 minutes (3 × 7 minutes)

=== Current Cast ===
- Sam Edmund (Host, 2011—present)
- Paul Roos (Panellist, 2011—present)
- Mike Sheahan (Panellist, 2011–present)
- Mark Robinson (Panellist, 2011—present)

== Classic Quarters ==
(Fox Footy Channel)

== The Club ==
(Seven Network, 2001)
Hosted by Craig Hutchison, with David Rhys-Jones (as the coach)

== The Collectors ==
(Fox Footy Channel)

== Cometti Live ==
Nine Network, 2002
Hosted by Dennis Cometti, with Ben Allan and Brad Hardie

== The Crows Show ==
Seven Network
Featuring James Brayshaw and Nikki Visser

== The Fifth Quarter ==
Network Ten, 2004–2011

== The Final Siren ==
Channel: One
Years: 2011
Airs: Sunday @ 6:00pm
Duration: 60 minutes / 30 minutes

=== Cast ===
- Michael Christian (Host, 2011)
- Chris Grant (Panellist, 2011)
- Jon Ralph (News reporter, 2011)

=== Segments ===
- Cross to Herald Sun office (With Jon Ralph)
- Top Ten Plays of the Week
- Performer of the Round (Presented by Chris Grant)
- Round Rewound

== The Final Story ==
Channel: Nine Network
Format: Documentary
Years: 2011 (4 episodes)
Aired: Sunday @ 12:00pm
Duration: 60 minutes

=== List of Episodes ===
- 1971: Hawthorn vs. St Kilda
- 1981: Carlton vs. Collingwood
- 1991: Hawthorn vs. West Coast
- 2001: Essendon vs. Brisbane:

== Footy Flashbacks ==
Fox Footy Channel [ {Channel7} Sandy Roberts after AFL gameDay finished in 2015]

== Football Inquest ==
Seven Network, ?–1974
Hosted by Mike Williamson, with Reg Hickey

== Footy Classified ==
Channel: Nine Network
Years: 2007–present
Airs: Monday @ 10:30pm
Duration: 60 minutes

=== Cast ===
- Garry Lyon (Host, 2007—present)
- Craig Hutchison (Panellist, 2007—present)
- Caroline Wilson (Panellist, 2007—present)
- Grant Thomas (Panellist, 2009—present)

=== Fill-in Cast ===
- James Brayshaw (Occasional guest host)
- Damian Barrett (Occasional guest panellist)

=== Former Cast ===
- Wayne Carey (Panellist, 2007)
- Glenn Archer (Panellist, 2008)

=== Current Segments ===
- Power Analyser
- Good Call? Bad Call?
- Caro's Arrow
- The Burning Question
- Tomorrow's Headlines

=== Former Segments ===
- Meet the Press

== Footy Plus ==
Seven Network, 1997–2002
Hosted by Bruce Abernethy, with James Brayshaw and Nikki Visser

== The Footy Show (AFL) ==
Channel: Nine Network
Years: 1994–2019
Airs: Thursday, 8:30pm
Duration: 90 minutes

=== Regular Cast ===
- Sam Newman (Presenter, 1994—present)
- James Brayshaw (co-host, 2006—present)
- Rebecca Maddern (co-host, 2016—present)

=== Semi-regular Cast ===
- Billy Brownless (Alternating panellist, 2006—present)
- Shane Crawford (Alternating panellist, 2006—present)
- Craig Hutchinson (News reporter, 2007—present)
- Damian Barrett (News reporter, 2007—present)

=== Former Cast ===
- Eddie McGuire (Host, 1994—2006)
- Trevor Marmalade (Presenter, 1994—2008)
- Doug Hawkins (Occasional panellist, 1994—?)
- Jason Dunstall (Occasional panellist, ?—?)
- Chris Jones (News reporter, 2006)
- Garry Lyon (2006–2015)

=== Current Segments ===
- Sam's Mailbag (by Sam Newman, 1994—present)
- Street Talk (by Sam Newman, 1994—present)
- Almost Football Legends (Originally by Trevor Marmalade, now by Shane Crawford/Billy Brownless, 1994—present)
- That's What I'm Talkin' About (By Shane Crawford and Chris Sheedy, 2009—present)
- Charlie Sheen Medal (2011—present)
- Hot Seat (2011—present)
- Old Man Crawf (2015 - present)

=== Former Segments ===
- Fyfe's Footy Flicks (Cartoonist Andrew Fyfe's satiric animations)
- Bill's Wheel (Billy Brownless travelled to local footy clubs for a competition)
- House of Bulger (Parody of daytime soap operas starring Shane Crawford)
- Bulger, MD (The sequel to House of Bulger)
- Hatchet Jobs (Chopped footage from coach interviews, 2006)
- Marstermind (Based on Who Wants to Be a Millionaire, presented by Eddie McGuire)
- Pillow Talk (James Brayshaw or Garry Lyon interview partners of AFL footballers)
- Under the pump (A member of the panel is questions by the cast)

== Four Quarters ==
Seven Network, 1995
Hosted by Sandy Roberts

== The Fox Footy Archive ==
Fox Footy Channel

== Fox Footy Feature ==
Fox Footy Channel

== Fox League Teams ==
Fox Footy Channel

== From The FOX Footy Vault ==
Fox Footy Channel

== The Game ==
Seven Network

== The Game Plan (AFL) ==
One

== The Gospel ==
Fox Footy Channel

== Grumpy Old Men ==
Fox Footy Channel
With Bob Davis, Kevin Bartlett and Tony Shaw / Doug Hawkins

== The Hey Jimmy! AFL Variety Hour ==
Channel: SBS
Years: 2002 (4 episodes)
Aired: Wednesday, 10:30pm
Duration: 60 minutes

=== Cast ===
- Jim Stynes (Host, 2002)
- Anthony Eales (co-host, 2002)
- Chris Hawthorne (co-host, 2002)
- Jim Krakouer (Panellist, 2002)
- Bianca Peters (Panellist, 2002)

=== Segments ===
- Jimmy on a Mission
- Scoreboard Pressure
- A Week's a Long Time in Football
- Auskick Future Star
- Hey Jimmy! Sitcom Sketch
- The Lesser Man
- High View in the Stands

== Just Footy / Just AFL ==
Seven Network, 1997
Hosted by Wayne Carey, with Wayne Campbell, Aussie Jones and Anthony Hudson

== Kellogg's Junior Supporters' Club ==
Hosted by Kevin Bartlett

== League Teams ==
Seven Network, early 1960s–1986
Hosted by Bob Davis, with Jack Dyer and Lou Richards

== Live and Kicking ==
Seven Network, 1998–1999 Hosted by Jason Dunstall, with Doug Hawkins and James Hird

== Living With Footballers ==
Fox Footy Channel

== On the Couch ==
Fox Footy Channel

== One Week at a Time ==
Channel: One
Years: 2009–2011
Airs: Monday 9:30pm
Duration: 60 minutes

=== Current Cast ===
- Stephen Quartermain (Host, 2009—present)
- Robert Walls (Panellist, 2009—present)
- Luke Darcy (Panellist, 2009—present)

=== Former Cast ===
- Matthew Lloyd (Occasional panellist, 2009)
- Tom Harley (Occasional panellist, 2009)
- Matthew Richardson (Occasional panellist, 2009)

=== Current Segments ===
- Top 10 Plays of the Week
- Mark of the Year
- Goal of the Year
- Hard Questions
- Hero of the Week
- Villain of the Week

== Rex Hunt's Footy Panel ==
Seven Network

== Saturday Central ==
Fox Footy Channel

== Seven's Match of the Round ==
Seven Network, 2002
Hosted by Rex Hunt

== The Sunday Footy Show (AFL) ==
Nine Network Hosted by James Brayshaw, with Shane Crawford, Nathan Brown, Damian Barrett, Billy Brownless and Dr. Peter Larkins

== Totally Footy ==
Network Ten, 2002

== Talking Footy ==
Seven Network, 1995–2002 Hosted by Bruce McAvaney (1990s) and Tim Lane, with Mike Sheahan, Malcolm Blight, Leigh Matthews, David Parkin, Terry Wallace, Gary Ayres, Robert Walls and Caroline Wilson

Seven Network, 2014–2019 Hosted by Luke Darcy with Tim Watson, Wayne Carey and Sam McClure.

== White Line Fever ==
Fox Footy Channel

== The Winners ==
ABC, 1978–1987 Hosted by Drew Morphett

== The Winners (Fox Show) ==
Fox Footy Channel, 2002–2006 Hosted by Clinton Grybas

== Yokayi Footy ==
NITV, 2020–present

Hosted by Tony Armstrong, Bianca Hunt (2020) and Megan Waters (2021-present), with rotating panellists, former AFL players Darryl White, Andrew Krakouer and Gilbert McAdam.

Much like its predecessor, The Marngrook Footy Show, it focuses on indigenous players and issues.

== See also ==
- Australian rules football culture
