= Talking Footy =

Australian football television program

- Also known as: Talking Finals (2023)
- Genre: Sport
- Presented by: Tim Watson (2003–2004, 2014–2020, 2023–2024); James Brayshaw (2023–2024); Joel Selwood (2023–2024); Trent Cotchin (2023–2024); Mitch Cleary (2023–2024)
- Country of origin: Australia
- Original language: English
- No. of seasons: 11

Production
- Production locations: Melbourne, Victoria
- Running time: 60 minutes

Original release
- Network: Seven Network (1994–2004, 2023–2024)
- Release: 1994 – 2004
- Network: 7mate (2013–2020)
- Release: August 2013 – 2020
- Release: September 5, 2023 – September 25, 2024

Related
- Speak (talk show)

Talking Footy is an Australian rules football television program on the Seven Network broadcast from 1994 to 2004, from 2013 to 2020 and again from 2023 to 2024. The show was hosted mainly by Bruce McAvaney and Luke Darcy in both runs of the show, now to be hosted by James Brayshaw.

== First instalment (1994–2004) ==
The program was first broadcast from 1994 until 2004. It was created by Gary Fenton, the Seven Network's then director of sport.

The show was hosted by Bruce McAvaney from 1995 to 1998 and 2001–2003, Tim Lane in 1999, Gerard Healy in 2000 and Tim Watson in 2004.

Regular couch members included Mike Sheahan, Malcolm Blight, Terry Wallace, Caroline Wilson and Leigh Matthews.

It was initially screened on Monday evening at 8:30 pm from 1995 until 1997, then on Monday at 11:00 pm in early 1998, then on Monday at 10:30 pm from late 1998 until the end of 2000. In 2001 it moved to Tuesday nights and stayed there until the program was axed at the end of the 2004 season. The program struggled in the last few years due to the network not having the rights to broadcast the AFL while also having poor ratings.

== Second instalment (2013–2020) ==
In August 2013, the Seven Network revived the series, which aired on a Thursday night throughout the 2013 final series with Bruce McAvaney, Luke Darcy, Wayne Carey and Andrew Demetriou as panelists.

The following year saw the show return to Monday nights at 7:30 pm on 7mate in Melbourne, Adelaide and Perth, and on delay at midnight the same day in Sydney and Brisbane.

The show is hosted by Luke Darcy with Wayne Carey, Tim Watson and Jacqui Felgate. It is broadcast from Seven's Docklands studios in Melbourne. Other panellist to appear on the program included Brian Taylor, Campbell Brown, Sam McClure and Mick Warner.

In June 2020, the program was temporarily axed along with AFL Game Day due to the effects of the coronavirus pandemic. The show was confirmed cancelled by Seven's head of sport Lewis Martin in March 2021 with a new “Footy Magazine” set to replace it.

=== Segments ===
Various segments on the show include:

- "The Blowtorch"
- "Inside 50"
- "Say That Again"

== Third instalment (2023–2024) ==
In August 2023, the Seven Network confirmed that Talking Footy would return with a new format labelled Talking Finals. James Brayshaw hosted the series with Tim Watson, Trent Cotchin and Joel Selwood appeared as panellist. Mitch Cleary provided sports breaking news, trade updates and team updates. The show was broadcast from the first week of the 2023 AFL finals series and run for four episodes in the lead up to the finals.

The first episode of the new Talking Finals was at 10:00 pm and following episodes were at 9:00 pm. The first episode was broadcast on Tuesday 5 September 2023 and Talking Finals ended on Tuesday 26 September 2023. No confirmation from 7 Upfronts if Talking Footy/Finals will return, speculating due to low ratings the show will be axed.

On 22 February 2024, it was confirmed by Seven that Talking Footy was returning in 2024, for the 2024 AFL season. James Brayshaw would host the program with Tim Watson, Trent Cotchin and Joel Selwood all appearing as panellists and Mitch Cleary providing sports breaking news, trade updates and team updates. The revival program premiered on 6 March 2024.

In November 2024, Talking Footy was cancelled yet again with Seven replacing the show with The Agenda Setters, a show in the same vein hosted by Craig Hutchison, Kane Cornes and Nick Riewoldt with Hutchison and Cornes being brought in from the Nine Network show Footy Classified, a show that was considered a rival show of Talking Footy from its 2013 relaunch onwards.

== Previous presenters and panellists ==
- Bruce McAvaney (1994–1998, 2001–2002)
- Tim Lane (1999)
- Gerard Healy (2000)
- Luke Darcy (2014–2020)

== Parodies ==
In 2005, comedian Andrew Startin appeared on the rival Nine Network with a send-up of the show on The Footy Show. Gary Ayres was sent up with his catchphrase "at the end of the day" and "You've got your Buckleys, your Hirds, your Ricciutos"; Mike Sheahan with "what do you think?"; and Bruce McAvaney with "Special!".

== Theme song ==
After using "Monday's Experts" by Weddings, Parties, Anything for 1995 and 1996 and "Everybody's Talkin'" by Harry Nilsson for 1997, the show's theme song was changed to an original composition in 1998.

The lyrics to the song are as follows:

The weekend's come and gone,

As we talk up a storm,
'Bout our team, bout our form,
And how it could be.

But when Monday comes around,
Talk around the town,
It's what happened on the weekend in the footy.

Monday nights, we're Talking Footy.

When the show switched to a Tuesday night timeslot (which led to its demise), the lyrics changed somewhat.

First in 2001 to change the second verse to the following:

And when the new week comes around,

The talk around the town,
Is what happened across the nation in the footy.

Tuesday night, we're Talking Footy.

By 2004, The second verse had changed to the following:

And the new week's come around,
Still we haven't found,
All the answers from the weekend in the footy.

Tuesday night, we're Talking Footy.

The original lyrics were restored for the 2014 relaunch, but only the second verse was used in the first few years of the relaunch. By 2018, it had been reduced to an instrumental version of the song with only the final three lyrics being used at the end. The theme was dropped for the 2023 relaunch.
