= Friday Night Football (AFL) =

- Genre: Sports broadcast
- Presented by: Hamish McLachlan
- Starring: Nick Maxwell; Matthew Richardson; Jacqueline Felgate
- Narrated by: James Brayshaw; Brian Taylor; Basil Zempilas; Cameron Ling
- Opening theme: "The Boys are Back"
- Country of origin: Australia
- Original language: English
- No. of seasons: 30

Production
- Running time: 180 minutes

Original release
- Network: Seven Network (1985–2001, 2007–present); 7mate (2012–present); Nine Network (2002–2006); Network Ten (2002–2006, finals only); Fox Sports Plus (2007–2011); Fox Footy (simulcast)
- Release: 29 March 1985 – present

Friday Night Football is an Australian sports broadcast series currently airing on the Seven Network.

== History ==
Non-weekend night matches of Australian rules football first emerged in the late 1970s/early 1980s with the night series, a knock-out tournament featuring teams from across the country and run in parallel with the league seasons.

The first Victorian Football League matches on Friday nights were introduced in 1985. At this time, these games were irregularly scheduled, and all matches featured North Melbourne, but by 1987, Friday Night Football was played on a more regular basis, and other clubs began to host the games.

Friday night AFL is generally played in Melbourne, at either the Melbourne Cricket Ground or Docklands Stadium, but Sydney, Adelaide and Perth will generally host a few matches each year. It is less common for the games to be played in Sydney, Brisbane or the Gold Coast in order to avoid clashes with the National Rugby League, which is more popular in those cities. As it is the most lucrative broadcast timeslot of the weekend, matches between the better-performing clubs are scheduled on Friday night to ensure the games are of high quality. As recently as 2014, however, the Gold Coast Suns have pushed to be featured on Friday nights in 2015, citing their improved form in 2014.

Seven's commentary team includes James Brayshaw, Brian Taylor and Hamish McLachlan, with smaller roles involving Wayne Carey, Cameron Ling, Tim Watson, Matthew Richardson, Leigh Matthews and Luke Darcy.

=== Broadcast history ===
The Seven Network, which broadcast football for around 40 years before losing the rights after the 2001 season, was the first Australian network to broadcast Friday Night Football.

Between 2002 and 2006, the Nine Network had the rights to the Friday night broadcast; as the network also had the rights to the NRL, during those years in Melbourne, Adelaide and Perth, where by the AFL match would be broadcast first live at 8:30pm, followed by Nightline (or a news update in 2006) and then the NRL match. This was reversed in Sydney, Canberra and Brisbane, where by the NRL match was broadcast first live at 8.30pm, followed by Nightline (or a news update in 2006) and then the AFL match.

The Seven Network regained the rights in 2007, and from 2007 to 2011 generally showed the match at 8:30pm into Melbourne; this was a one-hour delayed telecast for most matches, but was a live telecast for matches in Perth and sometimes Adelaide. Other than Perth and Adelaide games, only sold-out matches were broadcast live into Melbourne. This was primarily to allow the popular Better Homes and Gardens to be broadcast in the primetime 7:30pm slot. As part of this rights agreement, Seven was expected to show AFL at an earlier timeslot in New South Wales and Queensland in an attempt to boost popularity in those states. Foxtel took this responsibility off Seven, showing the Friday night match live into NSW and QLD on its Main Event channel at no extra charge for Fox Sports subscribers.

The television rights deal which began in 2012 saw Seven broadcast Friday night matches live from 7:30pm into Melbourne, with the last 60 minutes of Better Homes and Gardens being televised on 7Two in Melbourne and Adelaide (the first 30 minutes of that show is shown on the main channel in those two cities), though the whole 90 minutes of the show is televised on the primary channel in Sydney, Brisbane and Perth, as those cities receive Friday Night Football on 7mate.

In the early days of multichannelling, an early morning replay of the Friday night game was shown at 6am Saturday on 7Two. This was moved to 7mate for the 2011 season, but did not return from 2012 onwards.

From 2014, the Friday night telecast began at 7:00pm nationally, with the pre-game show being shown on 7mate.

== See also ==
- Saturday Arvo Football
- Saturday Night Footy
- Friday Night Football (NRL)
