= Andrew Startin =

Australian comedian

Andrew Startin is an Australian performer, impersonator and television personality.

Startin came to prominence in 1997 as a result of a video tape of him impersonating Sam Newman being sent into The AFL Footy Show in an attempt to win a trip to London. He won, and the incredible accuracy of his voice, expressions and mannerisms shot him to fame as he appeared four more times that year on The Footy Show, including one episode where he filled in for Sam Newman, after the controversial personality broke his leg.

In 1998, Startin split from Channel Nine amid much publicity. He was to join Channel Seven, and new football/variety show to rival Nine's The Footy Show. Live And Kicking provided guest appearances for Startin.

Startin has a vast repertoire of impersonations. They include football identities such as Bruce McAvaney, Dennis Cometti, Mike Sheahan, Gary Ayres and Leigh Matthews; as well as media personalities such as Molly Meldrum, Rove McManus and Roy Slaven.

After the demise of Live And Kicking, Startin has performed at corporate functions and made guest appearances at public interest functions such as the Grand Final Breakfast. He has been a guest on Channel Ten's The Panel and was a member of the cast on Russell Coight's Celebrity Challenge, also on Channel Ten. In 2005 he appeared on The Footy Show weekly as part of a parody of Seven's show Talking Footy. His most famous impersonation was of Gary Ayres, using such phrases as "At the end of the day".
