= Footy Classified =

Australian sports TV series

- Footy Classified logo
- Genre: Talk
- Presented by: Craig Hutchison (2007–2024); Caroline Wilson (2007–2024); Matthew Lloyd (2013–present); Kane Cornes (2020–2024); Eddie McGuire (2020–present); Jimmy Bartel (2023–present); Sam McClure (2020–present); Ross Lyon (2020–2022); Garry Lyon (2007–2015, 2017); Damian Barrett (2016–present); Chris Judd (2018–2019); Wayne Carey (2007); Glenn Archer (2008); Grant Thomas (2009–2012); Tom Morris (2025–2026); Rory Sloane (2025–present); James Hird (2025–present)
- Country of origin: Australia
- Original language: English
- No. of seasons: 12

Production
- Production location: GTV-9 Melbourne
- Running time: 60 minutes (including commercials)

Original release
- Network: Nine Network
- Release: 2 April 2007 – present

Related
- The Footy Show, The Sunday Footy Show

Footy Classified is an Australian television program broadcast two nights per week on the Nine Network, which discusses pressing issues relating to the Australian Football League and Australian rules football. It debuted on Monday 2 April 2007.

== Overview ==
The show was originally known by the working title Footy Confidential, before Foxtel later announced a gossip news show it was producing called Confidential, causing Nine to rename the show to Footy Classified.

Footy Classified consists of panellists: Matthew Lloyd, Eddie McGuire, Jimmy Bartel, Tom Morris, Sam McClure, Damian Barrett, Rory Sloane and James Hird. Following discussions on controversial events during the weekend of football, a special guest will arrive in the studio for an in-depth chat – usually a high-profile coach or player.

The show was known for its confrontations between Wayne Carey and Craig Hutchison, and between all panel members in general. One notable stoush consisted of Hutchison making a sign for Carey to hold up saying that he was "wrong" regarding Dean Laidley. Carey had previously stated that he wanted Laidley sacked because his poor media manner meant that he was not diplomatic enough to lead the club, North Melbourne. The team responded by winning four consecutive games and, eventually by making the Preliminary Final. During its first season, Wayne Carey was the fourth panellist but was released by Channel 9 after allegedly assaulting his girlfriend and police. He allegedly smashing a wine glass into his girlfriend's face causing lacerations to her mouth and neck. Carey was replaced by recently retired teammate Glenn Archer.

For the 2009 season, Glenn Archer was replaced by former coach Grant Thomas. After leaving the show, Archer has continued his media work, writing for a variety of newspapers.

It was reported on 21 September 2012 that Grant Thomas would not be returning in 2013. Nine announced on 28 November 2012 that former Essendon captain Matthew Lloyd would replace Thomas in 2013.

In March 2016, it was announced that Damian Barrett would join the panel on a full-time basis. He replaced Garry Lyon, who was addressing personal issues.

In 2020, it was announced that the show would air on both Monday and Wednesday nights, with Eddie McGuire and Ross Lyon joining the Wednesday night edition as host and panellist respectively, while Sam McClure joins the show as resident news-breaker.

In February 2023, it was announced that Jimmy Bartel will join the show and replace Ross Lyon.

In 2025, Tom Morris, Rory Sloane and James Hird joined the show replacing Craig Hutchison, Caroline Wilson and Kane Cornes.

=== Segments ===
- Good Call, Bad Call – introduced in 2009, this popular segment involves one of the panelists making a statement, followed by another replying with either "Good Call" or "Bad Call", and then explaining why.
- Closing Cook – Matthew Lloyd criticises 'low profile' individuals involved in AFL for making small mistakes, or for other reasons. These may include timekeepers, members of the crowd etc. Has evolved into a gaff for the panelists to laugh at as the show reaches its conclusion.
- Caro's Arrow – this was introduced in 2011, following Craig Hutchison stating that Caroline Wilson demanded her own segment. Within it, she criticises 'high-profile' individuals within the AFL administration, or AFL presidents like Eddie McGuire. The segment begins with an 'action hero' animation of Wilson.

== Panellists ==
- Current Monday Panellists:
  - Matthew Lloyd (2013–)
  - Jimmy Bartel (2023–)
  - Sam McClure (news) (2020–)
  - Damian Barrett (2016–)

- Current Tuesday Panellists:
  - Matthew Lloyd (2013–)
  - Eddie McGuire (2020–)
  - Rory Sloane (2025–)
  - Tom Morris (2025–)
  - James Hird (2025–)

- Former panellists:
  - Craig Hutchison (2007–2024)
  - Caroline Wilson (2007–2024)
  - Glenn Archer (2008)
  - Wayne Carey (2007)
  - Grant Thomas (2009–2012)
  - Garry Lyon (2007–2015, 2017)
  - Chris Judd (2016, 2018–2019)
  - Ross Lyon (2020–2022)
  - Kane Cornes (2020–2024)
- Guest panellists:
  - Chris Judd (2016–2019) substituted for Damian Barrett on multiple occasions
  - Damian Barrett (2016–2017) – regular fill-in presenter
  - Kane Cornes (2018–2019) – fill-in panellist

== Timeslot and ratings ==
Footy Classified leads the contested 10:30 Monday night time slot. After a rescheduling of programming in August 2009, this program now airs in Sydney and Brisbane at midnight on Tuesday.

While the show airs during the AFL premiership season, occasionally it may air outside of the football season in the event of major news.
