= Sam McClure =

Australian sports journalist (born 1991)

- Born: 1991 or 1992 (age 34–35)
- Education: Xavier College, University of Melbourne
- Occupation: Journalist
- Employer(s): Nine Network; The Age; 3AW; Sports Entertainment Network

Sam McClure (born 1991 or 1992) is an Australian sports journalist who works for the Nine Network, The Age, 3AW and Sports Entertainment Network.

== Career ==
McClure began his media career at 3AW as a broadcasting assistant in 2011, before moving into the role of a news reporter at the station and presenting a regular sports news segment alongside Gerard Healy on the program Sports Today. He later became a sports writer for The Age newspaper in Melbourne.

In 2015, McClure stated on 3AW that English football club Manchester United were interested in purchasing Australia's most supported Association football club Melbourne Victory, following the City Football Group's acquisition of Melbourne Heart Football Club (now Melbourne City) earlier that year, quoting that there were 'rumblings out of Manchester'. Both Manchester United and Melbourne Victory (via social media) stated that the rumours were false and a statement by chairman Anthony Di Pietro said this was unfounded and never occurred in any shape.

In 2017, McClure moved radio networks and became a reporter on 1116 SEN breakfast program Garry, Tim and Hamish, where he works alongside Garry Lyon, Tim Watson, and Hamish McLachlan. McClure became a regular football reporter on the Seven Network, featuring on Saturday afternoon pre-match program The Kick, and presenting Footy Central, a Friday and Saturday post-match report. He also briefly appeared alongside Tim Watson, Wayne Carey, and Luke Darcy on Talking Footy.

In 2021, McClure won the 2020 Quill award for the sports news category in relation to a contentious investigative report into the Adelaide Football Club's infamous 2018 pre-season training camp. The reward was later annulled after the report was retracted, but then reinstated by the Melbourne Press Club in 2022.

== Personal life ==
McClure studied a Bachelor of Media and Communications at the University of Melbourne. He is the son of late sports journalist Geoff McClure, also a reporter for The Age. Like his father, McClure is a Carlton Football Club supporter.
