= Dennis Cometti =

Australian sports commentator (1949–2026)

Dennis Cometti AM
- Cometti, c. 2019

Personal information
- Full name: Dennis John Cometti
- Born: 26 March 1949; Geraldton, Western Australia, Australia
- Died: 3 March 2026 (aged 76); Perth, Western Australia, Australia
- Height / weight: 190 cm

Playing career
Years	Club	Games (Goals)
1967–1971	West Perth	38 (70)
- Occupation: Sport commentator
- Years active: 1967−2021
- Employers: ABC Australia; Seven Network; Nine Network; Triple M Melbourne; Triple M Perth; 3AW

Dennis John Cometti (26 March 1949 – 3 March 2026) was an Australian sports commentator and a player and coach of Australian rules football. In a career spanning 51 years, his smooth voice, dry humour and quick wit became his trademark. Until his retirement, he remained the only television broadcaster to have spanned the entire duration of the Australian Football League (AFL) national competition, working for the Seven Network, the Nine Network and Broadcom. He was appointed a Member of the Order of Australia (AM) in the 2019 Australia Day Honours.

== Early life ==
Cometti was born on 26 March 1949 in Geraldton, Western Australia, the son of Dulcie (née Scarlett) and James Cometti. His father was the son of Italian migrants; his paternal grandfather, Giovanni Cometti, was from the village of Baruffini in Lombardy and moved to Australia to work on the Western Australian Goldfields. Cometti's father died suddenly when he was a teenager.

== WAFL and VFL football career ==
Cometti played 40 matches for West Perth. His best year in the West Australian Football League (WAFL) was 1968 when he kicked 63 goals playing for West Perth under Graham Farmer. Farmer wrote that "Dennis had just turned 19 and was well over 6 foot with the ability and agility of a co-ordinated rover. We thought we had a champion." In 1971, Cometti made the senior list at Footscray in the Victorian Football League (VFL) but, due to injuries and media commitments, was unable to make a mark and did not play a VFL senior match.

On his return to Perth, he played with some success in the Sunday Football League. He initially played for Wanneroo before moving to Maddington as captain-coach, leading the club to four successive grand finals and winning successive premierships in 1974, 1975 and 1976. After retiring as a player, he later coached Osborne Park and Kelmscott, winning a premiership in 1979.

In 1982, Cometti was appointed coach of West Perth. The club finished third in his first year, but his tenure at West Perth was otherwise uneventful and the team finished sixth in both 1983 and 1984. Other than a brief period as chairman of selectors for the Western Australia Australian rules football team, that was Cometti's last active involvement in club football.

== Commentary career ==
=== Early radio career (1968–1971) ===
In 1968, Cometti commenced his media career as a radio announcer in Perth as a Top-40 disc jockey at radio station 6KY. Over the following five years, he worked as an announcer on 6PM and 3DB in Melbourne and 6PR in Perth.

Cometti commentated his first football match in 1971 at a state game between Western Australia and Victoria at Subiaco Oval. Melbourne station 3KZ needed a caller and, due to a quirk of fate, Cometti volunteered to sit alongside Ian Major.

=== ABC (1972–1985) ===
Cometti joined the Australian Broadcasting Commission (ABC) in 1972 where he concentrated exclusively on sport. He broadcast his first Test cricket game in 1973 (at 23 the youngest in ABC history) and for the next 13 years broadcast Tests alongside Alan McGilvray. He also called WAFL football during his time at the national broadcaster either side of his stint as West Perth coach.

Throughout his career, Cometti was known for his memorable one-line comments, sometimes known as "Comettiisms" (or "Cometti-isms"). He was well known for coining the phrase "centimetre perfect", which became one of his best-known signature terms during his calling career.

=== Seven Network (1986–2001) ===
In 1986, Cometti's move to the Seven Network coincided with the formation of the West Coast Eagles in the VFL. However, because of a bitter battle over television broadcast rights which excluded the Seven Network, Cometti broadcast the first season of the expanded VFL competition on independent broadcaster Broadcom in all states apart from Victoria.

In 1988, when Seven regained the VFL television rights, Cometti immediately became the highest-profile commentator of VFL/AFL matches (he was based in Western Australia where he presented the evening news sports segment). He stayed with Seven until 2001 as the main sports presenter for Seven News in Perth after they lost the rights to broadcast AFL matches. He was succeeded by Basil Zempilas.

Along with his football and news commitments, with the blessing of Channel 7, Cometti commentated a further 51 Test games for the Kerry Packer-owned 2UE and 3AK radio stations alongside Henry Blofeld, Richie Benaud, Ian Chappell, Greg Chappell and Tony Greig who all worked at Channel 9 and on the radio when they were not calling on television. In 1997, Cometti toured South Africa with Drew Morphett covering the three- Test series on the Seven Network.

In the late 1990s, he was among those to have been sent up by impersonator Andrew Startin on Live And Kicking. The actor Eric Bana was another to impersonate Cometti.

He also commentated at the Summer Olympics swimming competitions in Barcelona 1992, Atlanta 1996 and Sydney 2000. When he retired, Cometti had broadcast more Australian Olympic gold medals than any other commentator of the television era.

=== Nine Network (2002–2006) ===
Cometti switched to the Nine Network before the 2002 AFL season, originally to mostly call Sunday games. On the eve of the season starting, he replaced Tim Lane for Friday night matches after Lane suddenly resigned when Nine denied his request for Collingwood president Eddie McGuire to not call matches involving his team. Cometti called Friday night games alongside McGuire, Dermott Brereton and Garry Lyon and became the channel's leading Australian rules football caller. He also called Sunday afternoon matches alongside Brereton and Dwayne Russell, mostly games which were played outside of Victoria. He was voted the Australian Football Media Association's television broadcaster of the year in all five years that he was at Nine and often also dominated Australia-wide newspaper polls for fan popularity.

He also read the sports report on the weeknight National Nine News bulletin in Perth. Occasionally, at Nine, he returned to cricket commentary calling domestic ING Cup one day matches and an Australia A game in 2003/04.

=== Return to the Seven Network (2007–2016) ===
With the Seven Network regaining the rights to broadcast AFL games from 2007, Cometti signed with Seven to call games alongside Bruce McAvaney, once again on Friday nights and Sunday afternoons. The pairing of Cometti and McAvaney became legendary, with their contrasting styles forming a famous bond and calling around 450 AFL matches together.

Cometti also had a weekly segment with Basil Zempilas on Seven News in Perth during the AFL season, mostly about the Perth-based games which Seven broadcast during the 2012-2016 period.

In August 2014, Cometti announced that he would retire as an AFL television commentator at the end of the 2016 season. His career was commemorated on-air in the lead up to and during Seven's coverage of the 2016 AFL Grand Final, the last AFL match he called on television (and won by his former club), accompanied by messages of congratulations from sponsor AAMI. All up he commentated on 16 VFL/AFL grand finals.

=== Later radio and newspaper career (2008–2021) ===
From 2008 to 2011, Cometti was the lead AFL caller on Saturday afternoons for 3AW, initially alongside Rex Hunt and later Brian Taylor. In 2009, he also wrote a fortnightly column and weekly blogs for The West Australian newspaper.

When Cometti revealed that he would be joining Triple M in 2012, he was immediately removed from 3AW's lineup to call the 2011 AFL finals series and was replaced by Dwayne Russell.

Cometti called Saturday afternoon games for Triple M with James Brayshaw, Danny Frawley and Garry Lyon. He was voted the nation's top AFL radio caller in a national News Ltd newspaper poll in 2012.

After retiring from television commentary, Cometti continued to call matches for Triple M for games in Western Australia with Lachy Reid, Andrew Embley and Xavier Ellis with his son Mark as the statistician. Cometti was also involved in the Seven Network's coverage of the WAFL as an expert commentator. In 2021, Cometti announced he would be retiring from broadcasting for good after the Perth-staged 2021 AFL Grand Final. In the aftermath of that game, Cometti was inducted into the West Australian Football Hall of Fame.

== Other work ==
Cometti was featured on Special Broadcasting Service (SBS) television in an episode of the first Australian series of Who Do You Think You Are?, where he traced his father's Italian heritage back to Italy and his mother's English heritage back to three convicts and a freeman. The show also revealed that his great-great-grandmother (although never charged) may have been involved in the deaths of two of her husbands.

In 2012, he appeared in a television commercial series for Carlton Draught's draught pick iPhone app.

=== Video games ===
Cometti was the voice-over commentator for the AFL video game series from 2004 to 2017.

== Personal life and death ==
Cometti was of Italian, English and French descent. He was married to Velia and they had two children, a daughter and a son.

Cometti died in Perth, Western Australia, on the night of 3 March 2026, after a long illness, 23 days short of his 77th birthday.

News of his death broke the following morning in Perth, which was quickly followed by tributes flowing from right across the country, including from Australia's Prime Minister, Anthony Albanese, in the House of Representatives, recognising Cometti's life and legacy.

His friend and former colleague Basil Zempilas later confirmed that Cometti had Alzheimer's disease and a "severe" form of dementia.

== Bibliography ==
- Back to the Place, Back to the Time (1997)
- Centimetre Perfect: The Classic Commentary (2004)
- That's Ambitious: More Classic Commentary (2007)
- The Game (edited, 2012)
- Kick it to the Shithouse (foreword, 2012)

== Awards and honours ==
- 2006 – Winner of the Alf Potter Award for that season's most outstanding media personality.
- 2014 – Voted Television Caller of the Year by the Australian Football Media Association for an unprecedented tenth time. 2016 – Retired with a total of eleven.
- 2017 – Was named the WA Sports Star of the Year at the West Australian of the Year awards
- 2018 – Perth Stadium's Media Centre named as the 'Dennis Cometti Media Centre'
- 2018 – Sport Australia Media Awards – Lifetime Achievement Award
- 2019 – Sport Australia Hall of Fame General Member
- 2020 – Australian Football Hall of Fame Inductee
- 2021 – West Australian Football Hall of Fame Inductee

Cometti is a member of both the Melbourne Cricket Club and AFMA Halls of Fame.

In October 2013, Cometti became the number one ticket holder of the Perth Wildcats professional basketball club. He held the position until September 2024.

"Dennis Cometti" is the name of an Australian punk band named in Cometti's honour.

The poet Mick Colliss performed a poem entitled "Centimetre Perfect" which paid tribute to Cometti on a 6NA, the radio station where Cometti had his start.
