= AFL Media =

Australian sports media company

AFL Media is an Australian sports media company operated by the Australian Football League (AFL) to provide coverage of the league and the sport of Australian rules football.

== History ==
Established in 2012, AFL Media provides content to AFL.com.au and the AFL Live mobile app, and formerly published the AFL Record from 2012 to 2018. Although Telstra currently holds the digital media broadcasting rights for AFL games, there is an agreement in place that allows AFL.com.au to host video content from Telstra Media. Telstra also receives the advertising revenue from the website. Although AFL Media is located in the same building as the AFL's headquarters in Docklands, Victoria, it employs an independent editorial and journalist team to report on the league and produce content on its various mediums.

Since its inception as a business, AFL Media had published the match-day AFL Record; however Crocmedia acquired the publishing arm of AFL Media in July 2018 and assumed the operations of producing the AFL Record and its related brands from 2019.

=== Controversy regarding the standing down of Mitch Cleary ===
The standing down of Mitch Cleary was a controversy was a dispute centred around AFL Media's decision to stand down journalist Mitch Cleary for posting a tweet revealing Brooke Cotchin, the wife of Richmond player Trent Cotchin, had breached the Australian Football League's (AFL) social distancing rules in the interstate "hubs" that all Victorian and New South Wales AFL teams were in following a resurgence of COVID-19 in Victoria and New South Wales. The move was widely condemned as a "betrayal of journalism", and it led to widespread public backlash, with many figures urging AFL Media to reinstate him to his position. Among the figures calling for his reinstatement was Brooke Cotchin, who voiced her support for Cleary in a tweet. Due to the backlash, AFL Media eventually walked back on their decision, reinstating Mitch Cleary to his previous position.

==== Reactions and aftermath ====
Journalist Caroline Wilson recommended that Cleary, who she deemed a "serious journo", should stop working for AFL Media. After the incident, fellow AFL Media journalist Damian Barrett declared his support for the AFL’s decision, a statement which was widely criticised.

The controversy resulted in a significant worsening of approval towards AFL Media, with several figures, including Collingwood president Eddie McGuire and radio broadcaster Gerard Whateley, stating that it had undermined the image of AFL Media as being independent from the Australian Football League. Journalist Rohan Connolly deemed the event a "disaster", and he stated that it was the product of a gradual decline in the quality of AFL Media's reporting. He went on to state that the event could undermine public confidence in the AFL.

== Content ==
AFL Media provides content for a range of digital products including AFL.com.au and the 18 clubs' official websites, the AFL Live mobile app and the various social media channels operated by the AFL on platforms such as Facebook, Twitter, Snapchat and Instagram. It also produces a range of podcasts and online videos analysing various aspects of the AFL, as well as operating the league's photography and film departments: AFL Photos and AFL Films, respectively.

It has been speculated that AFL Media could potentially control the broadcast of AFL games in future broadcasting agreements, and either directly sell to audiences itself or on-sell the content to free-to-air and subscription television networks.

== Criticism ==
Due to its direct affiliation with the Australian Football League, AFL Media has received criticism from rival media outlets and journalists questioning whether it can truly provide independent coverage of the league, and that it is not just a public relations tool. Former St Kilda coach Grant Thomas publicly reiterated this criticism in 2016, stating that AFL Media was "avoiding" reporting on several controversial issues to protect the AFL's brand.
