= Ricky Nixon =

Australian rules footballer

Personal information
- Full name: Ricky Lee Nixon
- Nickname: Chicken
- Born: 3 April 1963 (age 63)
- Original team: Golden Square (BFL)
- Height: 186 cm (6 ft 1 in)
- Weight: 83 kg (183 lb)

Playing career^{1}
Years	Club	Games (Goals)
1983–1985	Carlton	4 (1)
1986–1991	St Kilda	51 (32)
1992–1993	Hawthorn	8 (6)
Total		63 (39)
- ^{1} Playing statistics correct to the end of 1993.

Ricky Lee Nixon (born 3 April 1963) is a former Australian rules footballer in the VFL/AFL and a former sports agent. At the height of his career, he was one of the most high-profile sports agents in Australia, and a powerful figure in the AFL.

== Football career ==
Recruited from Golden Square in the Bendigo Football League, Nixon played four games for the Carlton Football Club between 1983 and 1985, for one goal, amid limited opportunities (he was an emergency 13 times in their 1982 premiership year). The half-back flanker then moved to St Kilda—where he played 51 games, including one final—and scored 32 goals between 1986 and 1991, but Nixon was never really able to establish himself with the club. A contractual dispute with the Saints in March 1992 saw him move to the Hawthorn Football Club, where he played eight games, including one final for six goals, before his retirement in 1993.

== Sports agent career ==
Nixon established his sports management company, Flying Start, in 1994 after eight years of teaching physical education at Carey Grammar. The company grew considerably to become one of the leading sports management companies in Australia. Nixon was a pioneer of group marketing of prominent athletes in Australia with his Club 10 team of AFL players, which included Gary Ablett Sr., Wayne Carey, Jason Dunstall, Tony Lockett and Garry Lyon.

He is widely acknowledged as a major leader in the innovative marketing of athletes and has been rated by The Age newspaper as the fourth-most-influential person of the past decade in the AFL. In 2000, Nixon rorted the salary cap to secure his client Wayne Carey an additional $400,000 in salary. According to Nixon, when the AFL complained about this manoeuvre, he simply told them "I run the competition, not you."

Flying Start's players included Matthew Richardson, Ben Cousins, Nick Riewoldt and Tom Hawkins. Nixon started a fitness club at Docklands Stadium, where he also co-owned the Locker Room Bar and Cougars Sports Bar with Michael Gudinski. He also commentated AFL on radio station Triple M and has been awarded the Australia Day Sports Medal for services to sport by the prime minister. He has since entered the education business with Flying Start providing online courses, including "How to be a Sports Agent".

In 2008, Nixon began a well-publicised campaign to escalate the Irish experiment and set up a formal system for recruiting promising young Irish Gaelic footballers for AFL teams. The plan was criticised by many Gaelic football officials and players, including Sydney's Tadhg Kennelly. Some consider that the campaign, which included screening camps in Ireland in August 2008, will result in a talent drain from Ireland to Australia, something that Nixon refutes.

=== Controversy and loss of accreditation ===
Nixon was deeply affected by the death of his longtime friend Clinton Grybas in January 2008, and subsequently lapsed into drug and alcohol addiction. In an interview with News.com.au, Nixon stated that "(After Grybas’ death) I started drinking, I had never done drugs in my life. I started doing cocaine, and I got addicted." In 2009, Nixon received a drink driving charge when he left the scene of an accident that he was involved in.

On 19 February 2011, it was claimed by a number of press agencies that Nixon had an inappropriate relationship with a 17-year-old girl. The girl had previously been embroiled in a series of controversies involving players from the St Kilda Football Club, including one of Nixon's major clients, Nick Riewoldt. Nixon admitted to visiting the girl at her hotel room on at least three occasions and providing her with alcohol.

Nixon fled Australia for London following the incident. He described an incident in which he pondered suicide while in England, but was talked out of it by former St. Kilda President Rod Butterss, who encouraged him to return to Australia.

He was given a two-year suspension by the AFL Players' Association Accreditation Board, on 18 March 2011. Following the loss of his accreditation, Nixon entered negotiations to sell his agency, Flying Start. Former Richmond Football Club president Clinton Casey purchased the agency for $900,000.

In July 2012 Nixon was charged with five offences following an alleged assault. In March 2013 Nixon pleaded guilty to charges of assault against his former fiancée and attempting to flee the police. He was sentenced to 200 hours of community service. In May 2013 Nixon was pulled over by police for speaking on his mobile phone while driving; he was found to also be driving while intoxicated and with a suspended licence.

In 2013, Nixon launched a stand-up comedy routine titled "Chicken Train". He announced plans to perform at the Melbourne International Comedy Festival, but did not get a slot to perform at the festival.

Nixon has now been accused of kneeing a police officer while in court facing prior assault charges. The incident reportedly occurred at the Melbourne Magistrates court where Nixon was facing charges stemming from an incident in March 2022. In the case, Nixon was accused of unlawful assault and discharging a missile, after Nixon reportedly assaulted a man in Port Melbourne. Nixon's lawyers claimed that the former football agent was acting in self-defence at the time.

== Later career ==
In 2014, Nixon relaunched Flying Start International as a sports agency and consultancy, having retained the rights to the brand. He also stated that he did not intend to regain accreditation. In 2015, Nixon was arrested for allegedly threatening to assault a two-year-old child on Facebook.

In January 2019, Nixon, along with his sons Lewis and Mitchell, started a charity known as Kicking for Cancer. It holds a charity football match every year to raise money to go towards kids with cancer. The charity is no longer operating as of March 2022. According to the ACNC, the charity has not submitted any financial reports in its 3 years of operation.

In July 2019, he started a new business, Vital Health Checks. The business reportedly used ex-ambulances to give people health checks at their preferred location.

In November 2023 Nixon was charged with selling AFL memorabilia with forged player signatures. Nixon claims he was unaware that the signatures were forged.

In April 2025 Nixon was arrested and charged over a series of posts made to his social media accounts that threatened police. Nixon claims in his defense that his account was hacked.
