= Saturday Night Footy =

- Genre: Sports broadcast
- Starring: Luke Darcy (host/commentator); Basil Zempilas (chief commentator); James Brayshaw (chief commentator); Matthew Richardson (commentator); Cameron Ling (field commentator); Andrew Welsh (field commentator)
- Country of origin: Australia
- Original language: English
- No. of seasons: 13

Production
- Running time: 270 minutes

Original release
- Network: Seven Network (2012–present); 7mate (2012-present); Network Ten (2002–2011); One (2009-2011); Fox Footy (simulcast)
- Release: 30 March 2002 – present

In Australia, Saturday Night Footy (formerly as Saturday Night Football) is the broadcasting of Australian Football League (AFL) Saturday night matches on television. Saturday Night Footy is generally considered to be one of the biggest stages and generates publicity for the clubs involved. It is for this reason that clubs involved generally want to perform at their best to avoid large-scale criticism from the media. The Seven Network has held the primary broadcast rights for the AFL since the start of the 2012 season.

The commentary team is led by Basil Zempilas, Cameron Ling, Luke Darcy and Matthew Richardson. Samantha Lane provides reports during the match and also features as a reporter during the pre-match segment, which runs for 45 minutes (or one hour for matches played in Adelaide or Perth) before the match is played. Dr. Peter Larkins provides injury updates during and after the feature match. The show begins at 6:30pm every Saturday night, immediately following Seven News in most markets.

The pre-match show, titled The Kick, is anchored by Darcy and runs for one hour in the lead-up to the feature match. This portion of the telecast includes, among others, segments such as: interviews with players and the coaches involved in the feature match, going behind the scenes of a team's training session, and featuring various celebrity guests. Rachael Finch, Lleyton Hewitt and Redfoo, among others, have featured as guests on Saturday Night Footy.

The post-match show, anchored by Darcy, reviews the match in detail and includes interviews with the players and coaches from both sides. The team also crosses to Sam McClure, at Footy Central, to recap the rest of the day's matches, and also to provide injury and player updates from those matches.

The original Saturday Night Footy telecast may not air into some states, as the current broadcasting contract requires the local teams to be televised into their respective states (for example, Saturday night matches involving the Brisbane Lions must be televised into Queensland). The pre-match show may also be omitted from the schedule if a local team's match being played in the twilight timeslot (i.e. 4:35 pm) is televised and overlaps into the 6:30pm timeslot.

During Seven's exclusively live broadcast of the AFL Grand Final as part of the 2012-2016 Broadcast Deal, the Saturday Night Footy team host both the pre-match show and the post-match show.

In 2018, James Brayshaw will join the Saturday Night Footy team.

== See also ==
- Friday Night Football (AFL)
