= Grant Thomas (footballer) =

Australian rules footballer (born 1958)

Personal information
- Born: 14 February 1958 (age 68)
- Original team: Frankston YCW

Playing career^{1}
Years	Club	Games (Goals)
1978–1983	St Kilda	72 (21)
1984	North Melbourne	7 (1)
1985	Fitzroy	4 (0)
Total		83 (22)

Coaching career
Years	Club	Games (W–L–D)
2001–2006	St Kilda	123 (63–59–1)
- ^{1} Playing statistics correct to the end of 1985.

Career highlights
- St Kilda Pre-Season premiership coach – 2004

Grant Thomas (born 14 February 1958) is a former Australian rules football player and coach. He most recently held the position of coach of the St Kilda Football Club from 2001–2006. He attended St Bede's College in Mentone.

== Playing career ==
=== St Kilda ===
Thomas began his playing career at the St Kilda Football Club in the VFL, debuting in 1978. He took a long time to break into the side as a regular senior player, but settled in as a centre half-back. He played 72 games for the Saints between 1978 and 1983 and kicked a total of 21 goals.

=== North Melbourne ===
Thomas then moved to North Melbourne in 1984, where he played a total of 7 games and kicked one goal.

=== Fitzroy ===
Thomas then moved to Fitzroy in 1985, where he played a total of 4 games and kicked 0 goals. Thomas then retired from his playing career from the VFL at the end of 1985.

=== Warrnambool ===
Following his retirement from the VFL at the end of 1985, in 1986 he moved to become the playing coach of Warrnambool in the Hampden Football League. He won four premierships with the club in just five seasons until 1990.

== Coaching career ==
After his retirement from playing, Thomas coached Old Xaverians in the VAFA in 1992 and was the chairman of selectors at the North Melbourne Football Club in 1993 under Denis Pagan.

In 1994 he was an assistant coach at St Kilda under senior coach Stan Alves before moving on to pursue various business ventures.

=== St Kilda Football Club senior coach (2001–2006) ===
With his experience in the business world, Thomas took a new philosophy to the St Kilda Football Club when he was appointed caretaker senior coach of St Kilda in 2001 after the mid-season sacking of Malcolm Blight. Thomas was eventually appointed as full-time senior coach of St Kilda.

Thomas had a focus on 'man-management' in his coaching style, as well as conducting practices on the running of the club that are common in the business world. This new style of coaching was characterised by Thomas's occasional use of jargon such as "processes" and "outcomes" – although they are now terms almost universally used by all coaches.

In early 2002, with the team having come off a 122-point loss to Geelong and with players such as Aaron Hamill, Fraser Gehrig, Heath Black, Robert Harvey, Peter Everitt, Stewart Loewe, Nathan Burke and Justin Koschitzke sidelined through injury or suspension, Thomas decided to implement an extraordinary game plan in a match against Sydney which involved flooding the Swans' forward line and continually denying them the ball by kicking towards the boundary line when there were few options forward. The result was an 8.8 (56)–all draw, with Nick Riewoldt winning an AFL Rising Star nomination for his breakout performance.

Thomas coached St Kilda to consecutive preliminary finals in 2004 and 2005 plus a Wizard Cup premiership in 2004.

While he initially came under fire for refusing to use the 'flood', Thomas slowly started to integrate the defensive style into his match-day approach with improved results. Despite the criticism, Thomas maintained an impressive win–loss record against some of league's most highly rated coaches, including Malthouse, Pagan, Eade, Matthews, Wallace and Craig.

Thomas once said in an interview about the St Kilda Football Club: "This club is what I'm about."

Thomas is only one of three coaches to coach St Kilda to three straight finals series. The others being Ross Lyon and Allan Jeans, St Kilda's 1966 premiership coach.

==== Sacking ====
After many injuries during the 2006 season, St Kilda finished sixth after the home and away season but were beaten in the elimination final by Melbourne. Injuries to Fraser Gehrig, Robert Harvey, Justin Koschitzke, Raphael Clarke and Xavier Clarke during the game, as well as the underdone Aaron Hamill and Max Hudghton, led to the Saints exiting the finals after leading for most of the match but being unable to run the game out. They finished the season in eighth position, which was not considered good enough by the club's president, Rod Butterss.

On 12 September 2006, it was announced that Thomas would no longer coach the club as a 'mutual' agreement. Thomas, however, maintained that the club had asked him to leave by sacking him and while he had accepted, it was not completely mutual. The decision was a shock to the football world considering that Thomas was only the second senior coach to lead the Saints to three consecutive finals series. It is not known why he was sacked, but many factors include the controversial match against Fremantle in Round 5, 2006 in which the Saints were stripped of two points following a hearing the following Wednesday, which ultimately cost them a top-four spot and the double chance, the long-term injuries to Justin Koschitzke, Aaron Hamill, Lenny Hayes and Fergus Watts and starting the season with two interstate trips in four weeks. Thomas was then replaced by Ross Lyon as St Kilda Football Club senior coach.

Thomas has shown no interest in ever coaching another AFL club.

== Post-coaching career ==
In 2007, Thomas was hired as a columnist for The Age and his columns appeared every Sunday until he was sacked on 19 July 2008 after an argument with the chief of football, Caroline Wilson, because Thomas had accused Wilson of being a liar on radio station SEN 1116. This led to Thomas losing his job at the paper. He then joined Melbourne sports station SEN 1116 as an expert commentator, until he was sacked by SEN on Monday 11 May 2009. The AFL denied that they played any part in the decision. Until 2012, he was also a weekly panellist on Footy Classified, alongside Wilson, Garry Lyon and Craig Hutchison.

=== Banking ===
Thomas is co-founder of the neobank Up. The bank is collaboration between software development company Ferocia and Bendigo and Adelaide Bank.

=== Digital media ===
In Feb 2018, Thomas founded and launched the podcast "Sam, Mike & Thomo". Together with media personality Sam Newman and decorated media journalist and TV personality Mike Sheehan, Thomas releases a weekly podcast on a wide range of global and domestic topics and current events, with a sprinkling of AFL sport comments and opinions.

== Personal life ==
Thomas has 8 children, 4 boys and 4 girls. Thomas has been married to Kerry Thomas since 1984. His son Tyson played senior football for the Northern Blues in the VFL.
