= Geoff McClure =

Australian sports journalist

Geoff McClure (13 August 1950 – 15 March 2010) was an Australian sports journalist.

McClure moved from Broken Hill to work for the Melbourne afternoon newspaper The Herald in 1969. In the early 1970s, he worked for the British Daily Express newspaper.

McClure barracked for Carlton Football Club. He was the father of journalist Sam McClure.
