= Damian Barrett =

Australian journalist

- Born: 17 October 1970 (age 55)
- Other names: Damo, Purple, Warrior, Wok Fry
- Occupation: Sports journalist
- Years active: 1990–present

Damian Barrett is an Australian journalist who works for AFL Media and covers Australian rules football.

== Career ==
Barrett has worked in the Australian sports media, covering a variety of sports, for over 30 years. He has worked for the Herald Sun, The Footy Show, The Sunday Footy Show, Footy Classified on Channel 9, and on Triple M radio. In 2018, he joined AFL Media as their chief correspondent being involved in programs on the digital service, including Access All Areas and some of their podcasts. He also co-hosts the long-running The Sounding Board podcast with Craig Hutchison. He is a multiple award winner of Most Outstanding News Reporter (electronic) at the Australian Football Media Association awards, and in 2013 won a Quill Award for the best Best Sports News Story in any Medium for his reporting on the Essendon Football Club supplements saga.

== Controversies ==
Over the course of his career, Barrett has gotten into numerous disputes with both AFL players and coaches. Barrett was involved in a physical altercation with North Melbourne coach Brad Scott in 2016, that occurred when Barrett was questioning Scott about the Kangaroos performance in the 2016 AFL season. Barrett has stated that he feels journalists should be held less responsible for stories that turn out to be false.

During August 2020, Barrett became involved in the Mitch Cleary controversy when he voiced his opinion that the AFL made the right move by standing down fellow journalist Mitch Cleary, at odds with the majority opinion of the AFL community. This opinion was criticized by former AFL player Tim Watson, and Barrett responded by questioning Watson's understanding of journalism, and bringing up the Essendon Football Club supplements saga. Watson responded by declaring Barrett to be "The Voice of Treason" and calling Barrett "beholden to the AFL".
