= Centre half-forward =

Australian football position

In Australian rules football, the centre half-forward is a position on the half-forward line of a football field. The directly opposing player is a centre half-back. Royce Hart of the Richmond Football Club and Wayne Carey of the North Melbourne and Adelaide football clubs are often considered to be two of the greatest centre half-forwards of all time. Royce Hart is the centre half-forward in the AFL team of the century.

The centre half-forward's role is usually one of the most miss of any player on the field, with a tall frame, strength, and—most importantly, athleticism—required. Usually, the best backman will be used to cover a quality CHF, unless the opposing full-forward is so good they take priority. Thus, an attacking team with a solid combination of both centre half-forward and full-forward will seriously stretch a defence.

If a team in the AFL played without a reliable centre half-forward, then they would often struggle to win games or make an impact on the competition. Great centre half-forwards have the ability to turn games on their head and practically win a match single-handedly for their team.

A primary skill needed is good marking ability, with long-range goalkicking also being of great value. Centre half-forwards frequently line up shots on goal from about 50 metres out, often as wide as the boundary. At AFL level especially, kicking goals on the run while running into the 50-metre arc is a significant and requisite skill, as well as being able to pick out markers closer to the goal square.

The position is very strenuous, and players who specialise as centre half-forwards often have unnaturally shortened careers—Dermott Brereton is a good example of a great player whose career was probably shortened by a few years due to sustained injuries that made any kind of meaningful return to form insurmountable. In the modern game, coaches preserve these players, playing them in a variety of relief positions, often in the opposite position at centre half-back; this typically preserves the longevity of their career. A good example is James Hird, who often played on the half-back flank towards the end of his career, while others may only play in centre half-forward only when there is a more senior full-forward ahead of them in the depth chart.

Australian rules football positions
B:	back pocket	full-back	back pocket
HB:	half-back flank	centre half-back	half-back flank
C:	wing	centre	wing
HF:	half-forward flank	centre half-forward	half-forward flank
F:	forward pocket	full-forward	forward pocket
Foll:	ruckman	ruck rover	rover
Int:	interchange bench	interchange bench	interchange bench
Int:	interchange bench		
Coach:	coach		
