= The Game (Australian TV series) =

- Starring: Dermott Brereton
- Country of origin: Australia
- Original language: English

Original release
- Network: Seven Network
- Release: 2000 – 2001

The Game is an Australian television show that aired in 2000 and 2001 on the Seven Network.

It was hosted by Dermott Brereton, who defected from the Nine Network to Seven amid much controversy. Following Seven's loss of the AFL coverage rights, Brereton moved back to Nine in 2002.

The Game was seen as a replacement to the failed Australian rules football show Live and Kicking (1998–99), but in terms of ratings it was even less successful and was axed.
