= Tom Morris (journalist) =

Australian sports journalist

Tom Morris (born 30 July 1991) is an Australian sports journalist who specialises in Australian rules football and cricket. He is a football reporter at the Seven Network and also appears on Sunday Footy Feast and Agenda Setters.

== Career ==
=== Television ===
==== Fox Sports ====
In 2015, Morris was hired by Fox Sports.

A keen cricket lover, Morris also worked for Fox Cricket and caught a ball at a Big Bash League match. Morris also contributed to Cricinfo.

==== Nine Network ====
In November 2023, Morris was hired by the Nine Network as the chief football reporter.

Morris hosts Nine's AFL show Footy Furnace with James Hird and Jimmy Bartel.

In 2025, Morris joined Footy Classified.

Seven Network

In 2026, Morris joined the Seven Network’s AFL and cricket coverage. He will also host the network’s weekly Wednesday night program The Agenda Setters, alongside 7NEWS chief football reporter Mitch Cleary, Nick Riewoldt, and a rotating fourth panellist.

=== Radio ===
==== AFL ====
He has also held roles with 3AW, SEN, News Corp and the St Kilda Football Club.

In March 2023, Morris returned to the media hosting Sunday Crunchtime on radio station SEN with former Fox Footy colleague Sarah Olle.

In May 2023, Morris broke the story that Richmond coach Damien Hardwick was to announce his resignation effective immediately. Morris received praise from his peers for the scoop.

==== Cricket ====
In 2024, Morris joined the SEN cricket team as host and commentator of their coverage of the 2024/2025 Australian summer of cricket.

== Controversies ==
In 2019, Morris was branded a "Leech" by Fremantle forward Jesse Hogan. Hogan claimed that Morris used information while working at Melbourne to “get a leg up” in his career. Morris denied this on air.

In 2022, Morris was confronted by Western Bulldogs coach Luke Beveridge in a post-game press conference after the season opener over a team selection story Morris reported. This was overshadowed the following day, when offensive comments about a female colleague by Morris were leaked. Furthermore, a second clip featuring homophobic and racist slurs made by Morris also emerged on social media and Morris was sacked by Fox Footy. Morris apologised unconditionally for his comments.

After a year away from the public eye, Morris broke his silence on the Don't Shoot the Messenger podcast.

== Awards ==
In 2017, Morris won the Australian Football Media Association's Clinton Grybas Rising Star Award for best emerging talent in football media.

In 2023, Morris won the Australian Football Media Association's Alf Brown Award for best overall media performer, for breaking the story that Damien Hardwick was resigning as Richmond coach. He also won the award for best news or feature reporting by an individual (radio/TV) for his work on the Hardwick story.

In 2024, Morris won the Australian Football Media Association's Awards Best News or Feature Reporting, and Best Online News or Feature Reporting.
