= Australian Spartan =

2018–2019 Australian TV series

- Genre: Reality competition; Sports entertainment
- Presented by: Edwina Bartholomew; Hamish McLachlan
- Country of origin: Australia
- Original language: English
- No. of series: 2
- No. of episodes: 10

Production
- Production companies: Eureka Productions; Matchbox Pictures

Original release
- Network: Seven Network (season 1); 7mate (season 2)
- Release: 25 February 2018 – 4 December 2019

Related
- Spartan: Ultimate Team Challenge

Australian Spartan is an Australian sports entertainment and reality competition television series. An adaptation of the American format Spartan: Ultimate Team Challenge, it is hosted by Edwina Bartholomew and Hamish McLachlan with Wendell Sailor as sideline reporter. The series follows teams of contestants obstacle racing through courses based on spartan races. The first season premiered on the Seven Network on 25 February 2018.

== Background and production ==
The format was first rumoured in August 2017, following the recent surprise success of Nine Network series Australian Ninja Warrior, which is of a similar genre. The Seven Network wanted to capitalise on the popularity of fitness-themed programming, and sought a related format. A casting notice for Australian Spartan was announced the following month with Seven confirming it was the broadcaster weeks later, with Matchbox Pictures and Eureka Productions producing the program.

Edwina Bartholomew and Hamish McLachlan were announced as co-hosts in November 2017 with Wendell Sailor joining the hosting team the following month. The series is filmed in Brisbane with funding from the Government of Queensland's Screen Queensland. Two seasons of the show were filmed prior to the first season's broadcast.

The original American format Spartan: Ultimate Team Challenge airs in Australia on subscription television channel FOX8.

== Broadcast ==
The series was expected to air in the second quarter of 2018, after the Seven Network's broadcast of the 2018 Commonwealth Games. However, the show's debut was brought forward to 25 February 2018 to precede the Seven Network's coverage of the 2018 Winter Olympics closing ceremony. After two episodes being aired, the show was bumped from the Sunday primetime slot, returning during the Easter non-ratings period.

Because of the first season's mediocre ratings, the already shot second season was shelved for more than a year before it was announced that it would premiere on 6 November 2019 at 7:30pm on Seven's multichannel, 7mate.

== Format ==
The show begins with sixty teams consisting of three competitors each, with 20 teams each competing in three initial heats. The top 5 teams from each of the heats (who have completed the course or have progressed the farthest if they had not) then repeat the same course in the semi-final, resulting in a top 10 who take on each other in an extended course. The top 2 teams then compete head to head for the grand prize on a special, shortened course.

== Obstacles ==
The main course is divided into two zones, a dry zone and a wet zone. Both feature water; in the dry zone any competitor who touches the water results in their team instantly ending their run, while the wet zone features obstacles that are within or flooded by water. Some obstacles also involve time limits.

== Viewership ==
=== Season 1 ===
No.	Title	Air date	Timeslot	Overnight ratings		Consolidated ratings		Total viewers	Ref(s)
No.	Title	Air date	Timeslot	Viewers	Rank	Viewers	Rank	Total viewers	Ref(s)
1	Heat 1	25 February 2018	Sunday 7:00pm	816,000	5	32,000	5	848,000	
2	Heat 2	4 March 2018	Sunday 7:00pm	524,000	10	21,000	10	545,000	
3	Heat 3	25 March 2018	Sunday 7:00pm	462,000	9	10,000	12	472,000	
4	Semi-final	26 March 2018	Monday 7:30pm	401,000	—N/a	—N/a	—N/a	401,000	
5	Final	2 April 2018	Monday 7:30pm	447,000	16	21,000	15	468,000	
