= Live and Kicking (Australian TV program) =

- Genre: Sports
- Country of origin: Australia
- Original language: English

Original release
- Network: Seven Network
- Release: 1998 – 1999

Live and Kicking is a television show that was broadcast in Australia on the Seven Network in 1998 and 1999.

An Australian rules football show focusing on the Australian Football League (AFL), the show featured Jason Dunstall, Doug Hawkins and Craig Hutchison among others.

The show was aimed as a variety show, with footballers in the AFL invited onto the show to perform songs. Players included Daniel Harford (performing Five's "When the Lights Go Out"); Nicky Winmar (performing "That's All Right (Mama)" by Elvis Presley); Dale Lewis; Nick Daffy; and Adam Heuskes (performing "Holiday" by Madonna).

Musical guests on the show also included Taxiride and Human Nature.

Jason Dunstall announced his retirement live on air after months of speculation.

The show was broadcast on Wednesday nights, to avoid competition with the more established The Footy Show on Thursdays. However, ratings were low and the show was axed after the 1999 AFL season, replaced in 2000 by The Game.

== See also ==
- List of Australian television series
