= AFL Game Day =

2008–2020 Australian TV series

- Genre: Sport
- Presented by: Hamish McLachlan
- Country of origin: Australia
- Original language: English
- No. of seasons: 11
- No. of episodes: 252

Production
- Production locations: Melbourne, Victoria
- Running time: 90 minutes

Original release
- Network: Seven Network
- Release: 16 March 2008 – 22 March 2020

AFL Game Day is an Australian television program broadcast on the Seven Network in Victoria, South Australia, Western Australia and Tasmania and on 7mate in all other states. In Victoria, South Australia, Western Australia and Tasmania it aired following Weekend Sunrise.

The program focused on the current issues in the Australian Football League. It first aired on 16 March 2008 and aired at 10am on Sundays throughout the AFL season.

== History ==
The weekly program was hosted by Hamish McLachlan and had regular guests such as Leigh Matthews, Mark Stevens, Jude Bolton, Cameron Ling or Jimmy Bartel. Several current players or coaches also appeared each week. The program was extended to 90 minutes in 2012, finishing at 11:30 am, meaning the last half-hour went head to head with the Nine Network's The Sunday Footy Show.

During the 2010 AFL finals series, the program was also broadcast on Thursday nights at 7:30 pm. A special Saturday morning edition has aired on the day of the Grand Final from 2012 until 2019.

In March 2020, the program revealed a brand new set and graphics. However, in June 2020, the program was axed due to the effects of the coronavirus pandemic.

Nat Edwards was the main fill-in presenter for McLachlan.

== Host & panelists ==
=== Host ===
- Hamish McLachlan

=== Final Panelists ===
- Leigh Matthews
- Jude Bolton
- Cameron Ling
- Mark Stevens
- Nick Maxwell
- Jimmy Bartel
- Daisy Pearce
- Kathleen Pettyfor (Injury Updates)
- Nat Edwards (News Updates)

=== Former panelists ===
- Mark Robinson
- Tom Harley
- Jon Anderson
- Matthew Richardson
- David Schwarz
- Mark Ricciuto
- Peter Larkins

== See also ==
- List of Australian television series
- List of longest-running Australian television series
