= Wayne Carey =

Australian rules footballer

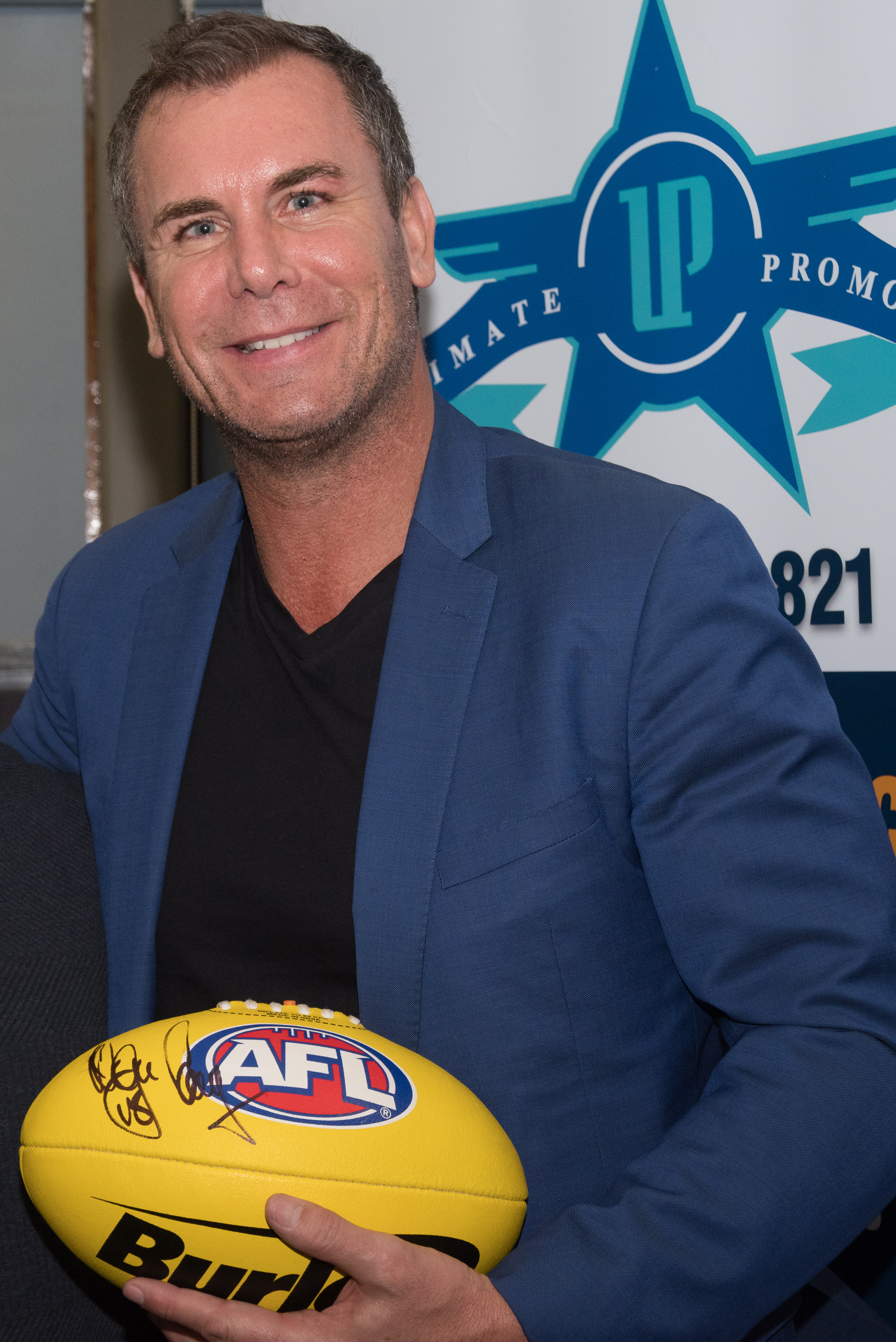
- Carey in 2019

Personal information
- Nicknames: The King, Duck
- Born: 27 May 1971 (age 55); Wagga Wagga, New South Wales, Australia
- Original teams: North Wagga; North Adelaide
- Height: 192 cm (6 ft 4 in)
- Weight: 97 kg (214 lb)
- Position: Centre half-forward

Playing career^{1}
Years	Club	Games (Goals)
1989–2001	North Melbourne	244 (671)
2003–2004	Adelaide	28 (56)
Total		272 (727)

Representative team honours
Years	Team	Games (Goals)
1990	New South Wales	1 (1)
1992	South Australia	1 (2)
1993	NSW/ACT	1 (1)

International team honours
1998	Australia	2 (4)
- ^{1} Playing statistics correct to the end of 2004.

Career highlights
- Club: 2× AFL Premiership: 1996, 1999; 2× Leigh Matthews Trophy: 1995, 1998; 7× All-Australian Team: 1993–1996, 1998–2000; 4× All-Australian Team Captain: 1993, 1998–2000; 4× North Melbourne Best & Fairest: 1992–1993, 1996, 1998; 5× North Melbourne leading goal kicker: 1995–1996, 1998–2000; North Melbourne Captain: 1993–2001; Australian Football Hall of Fame; North Melbourne Team of the Century: (Centre Half Forward); North Melbourne Hall of Fame; North Melbourne Team of the Century Captain; Michael Tuck Medal: 1998; 3× AFL Pre-Season Premiership: 1995, 1998 2003; VFL: U-19 Premiership: 1988; Lou Richards Medal: 2000; Representative: Captain of New South Wales/ACT: 1993; Vice Captain of Southern NSW/ACT Team of the Century; Captain of Australia: 1997

Wayne Francis Carey (born 27 May 1971) is a former Australian rules footballer who played with the North Melbourne Football Club and Adelaide Football Club in the Australian Football League (AFL).

A dual-premiership captain at North Melbourne (1996 and 1999), four-time North Melbourne best-and-fairest (Syd Barker Medallist) and seven-time All-Australian, Carey is nicknamed "The King", or "Duck". In 2001, he was named as centre half-forward and captain of North Melbourne's Team of the Century, and in 2008 was named as Australian football's greatest-ever player, as part of a list of the top 50 players of all time, published in the book The Australian Game of Football, which was released by the League to celebrate 150 years of Australian rules football.

In 2002, he left North Melbourne in disgrace after it was revealed he had been having an extramarital affair with the wife of his then-teammate Anthony Stevens. He is also known for a string of legal problems, which include domestic violence charges and assault convictions.

From 2014, Carey has worked as a Friday night football commentator and Talking Footy panelist with Channel Seven. He has also written as a columnist for The Age and is a regular fixture on Triple M's The Rush Hour segment called "The Midweek Rub", which has since been spun off as its own podcast. He had previously worked for 3AW and Channel 9 before being fired for a glassing incident in Miami. Carey worked at Channel 7, Triple M and The Age until 2022 when he was sacked from all three roles due to an alleged incident at the Perth Casino.

In 2023 Carey started his own podcast called ‘The Truth Hurts’ - the original co-host was Ayrton Woolley in 2023 and then Tony Sheahan from 2024. In late 2024 Carey closed this podcast down.

In late 2024, Carey joined the 'You Cannot Be Serious' podcast with Sam Newman.

In late 2026, Carey resigned from the ‘You Cannot Be Serious’ podcast with Sam Newman due to on air clashes over controversial topics including the ‘Sydney Swans Pullman Hotel scandal’.

== Early life and education ==
Wayne Francis Carey was born on born 27 May 1971, the son of Kevin and Lynne Carey. Carey was one of five children, and he spent his early years in Wagga Wagga, New South Wales. His mother and father separated when Carey was aged six, with his mother taking four of the children to Adelaide, living in a homeless shelter. According to Carey's autobiography, his father was a violent man who had spent time at Mannus Correctional Centre and was troubled by alcoholism. A few months later, Kevin Carey retrieved the children from his estranged wife, and they returned to Wagga Wagga.

Carey played rugby league as a junior, and he began playing Australian rules football at the age of eight. At the age of thirteen, Carey returned to Adelaide, where he attended The Heights School and played junior football for North Adelaide.

== Playing career: 1987–2004 ==
=== AFL ===
==== VFL debut: 1987–1989 ====
In 1987, Carey was recruited by North Melbourne after their CEO, Greg Miller, met with the Sydney Swans' football department to discuss the transfer to North Melbourne of John Longmire, a highly regarded junior key-position player. Once that deal was concluded, Miller then inquired about Carey who, like Longmire, was zoned to the Swans due to having lived in New South Wales. He made a token offer of $10,000 as a transfer fee, to which the Swans surprisingly agreed. As a 16-year-old, Carey made the move to Melbourne and played for the North Melbourne under-19s, where he starred in their 1988 premiership side under coach Denis Pagan. Carey was promoted to the senior list prior to the 1989 season and, after recovering from dislocating his left shoulder in a practice match early in the year, made his first appearance for the seniors as an 18-year-old in round 11 of 1989 against Fitzroy.

==== State of Origin ====
Carey had a relatively short but successful State of Origin career, and what he describes as a significant period in his career. Carey first played at the game's highest level in 1990 for New South Wales, in a famous win over Victoria, in the side's third-ever win against the state; Carey scored one goal. In 1992, playing for South Australia against Victoria, Carey played an outstanding game, dominating at centre half-forward and kicking two goals, including the match-winner from 55 metres out in the dying moments. Carey had four opponents in the game, dominating them all, including Chris Langford, Danny Frawley and Garry Lyon. Carey has described this game as the moment he knew he belonged at AFL level, as State of Origin at that time was considered to be the most challenging level of the game. Carey played for NSW/ACT the following year in the State of Origin Carnival, scoring one goal. In the latter half of the 1990s, clubs began putting pressure on players to pull out of State of Origin games due to fear of injury, and players began to stop participating, with the final non-charity State of Origin game occurring in 1999.

1989–2001

The 1990s was a decade dominated by forwards, and Wayne Carey dominated his role at centre half-forward more than perhaps any other player in his position before or since.

"Carey had established a reputation as one of perhaps the dozen greatest players of all time," according to writer John Devaney of australianfootball.com.

"It was clear right from the outset that the Kangaroos had managed to get their hands on someone special. Powerfully built even then, Carey could mark strongly even under the most extreme pressure, and his kicking either to position or at goal was impeccable. He was also surprisingly quick, both over the ground, and in terms of his decision making and use of the ball. Carey won the first of his four North Melbourne best and fairest awards in 1992, and the following year was appointed captain.

"North's emergence as one of the power clubs of the AFL during the mid- to late 1990s was attributable in no small measure to Carey's presence and contribution. It is arguable that no footballer in history has ever been capable of winning a game entirely off his own boot, but Carey at his peak perhaps came as close as anyone. On a purely objective measure, he was probably worth at least three players—which, coincidentally, is sometimes the number of opponents he had to contend with. Named an AFL All-Australian in 1993, 1994, 1995, 1996, 1998, 1999 and 2000, Carey was selected as captain of the side on four occasions. In both 1996 and 1999 he was a pivotal member of his club's two most recent premiership sides."

—John Devaney

==== Extramarital affair and leaving North Melbourne for Adelaide: 2002–2004 ====
In March 2002, Carey had an extramarital affair with the wife of North Melbourne stalwart and Vice Captain Anthony Stevens, Kelli. Making the situation even messier was the fact that Carey was himself married to his long-term partner, Sally McMahon. Carey and Stevens were attending a party at teammate Glenn Archer's house. Carey is quoted as saying Kelli followed him into the toilets in front of a large crowd, including her husband. An argument ensued between Carey and Stevens, and both players subsequently failed to attend football training. In the face of his team being united against him, as well as nationwide condemnation, Carey resigned in disgrace from North Melbourne. Carey's then manager Ricky Nixon, infamously stated that his client was on "suicide watch" during the aftermath. To avoid media attention, Carey fled to Las Vegas. Stevens had been groomsman to Carey at his wedding to Sally.

North Melbourne Legend Brent Harvey said it set the club back "four or five years". The aftermath of the affair resulted in Carey missing the 2002 AFL season and transferring to the Adelaide Crows for the 2003 AFL season; he would play two seasons with the Crows, including kicking 56 goals, retiring at the end of the 2004 AFL season. The first game played between North Melbourne and Adelaide in 2003 made for gripping viewing, with Archer and Stevens both taunting and making aggressive moves towards Carey. Although tension was at fever pitch, all players involved managed to restrain themselves from doing anything overly rash. Adelaide went on to win convincingly by 54 points. Carey played against North Melbourne 2 more times in his career after this, with the crows losing the return game in 2003 by 10 points and the 2004 bout by 75 points. In a twist of fate, Stevens took over Carey's role of captain in 2002.

In February 2022, 20 years after the initial fallout from the affair, Carey labelled his affair with Stevens "the biggest regret of my life as an adult" while participating on season three of the reality TV show SAS Australia. Despite withdrawing from the show, Carey was reportedly paid A$250,000 for the appearance.

In August 2022, Carey and Stevens met again at a function to celebrate the 26th anniversary of their 1996 premiership (which was initially supposed to be a 25th anniversary but was delayed by a year due to COVID-19); Carey engaged Stevens in a "verbal stoush" at the function, although the situation was reportedly de-escalated. The Herald Sun reported there was no potential of violence and that the pair "moved on and shared a beer together" afterwards.

Despite both players' marriages being rocked by the public scandal, it took each marriage several years to dissolve. Carey's marriage ended in 2006, four years after the incident, while Kelli and Anthony Stevens divorced in 2008, six years after the affair.

== Australian Football Hall of Fame ==
Carey was inducted into the AFL Hall of Fame in 2010. Although he was eligible for induction in 2008, his off-field troubles with drugs and violence delayed his induction.

== Alleged creative salary cap ==
Due to restrictions in the salary cap, North Melbourne was capped at $300,000 per year for Carey for the 2000 AFL season. However, the North Melbourne staff knew that Carey was far more valuable to the team than this, so Carey's manager Ricky Nixon came up with a creative salary cap move to secure Carey an additional $400,000 in salary.

Nixon said, "So I requested Wayne's intellectual property, and it was owned by Wayne Carey Pty Ltd, and he licensed it to me for $2 so I could sell it to North Melbourne for marketing rights of $700,000," Nixon said on the Real Footy podcast. "He was getting paid $300,000 from North Melbourne and $700,000 went to me, and I gave Wayne $400,000. People said it was cheating, but it was absolutely within the rules."

According to Nixon, when the AFL complained about this manoeuvre, he simply told them: "I run the competition, not you."

== Legacy ==
Carey has been named by many media commentators as the greatest footballer to play the game. In 1999, Leigh Matthews, who was voted the greatest player of the 20th century, honoured Carey by saying that he was the best player he had ever seen. In 2008, Carey was named as Australian Football's greatest-ever player as part of a list of the top 50 players of all time, published in the book The Australian Game of Football, and he placed third in a similar list put together by a panel of football legends in The Age newspaper the same year. In 2011, the Herald Sun polled 21 past and present AFL greats, including Carey, to find the players' opinion as to the greatest player of the AFL era. Carey topped the list, polling 85 of a possible 100 votes, 26 votes ahead of second-placed Gary Ablett Sr.

The love triangle involving Carey, Anthony Stevens, and Stevens's then-wife Kelli has inspired creative works across Australian television and music, including the song "Sure Got Me" on Paul Kelly's 2004 double album Ways & Means. Hunters & Collectors frontman Mark Seymour also wrote a song inspired by the affair, but he declined to release it after learning of Kelli's take on the events. Jock Cheese, bassist of the satirical Melbourne band TISM, released a tribute to Carey titled "Why Don't You Get A Bigger Set of Tits?" on his 2002 solo album Platter. In a performance inspired by the Carey-Stevens scandal, Warwick Capper played an AFL footballer named "Dwayne Carey" in season 3 of the SBS comedy series Pizza.

== Statistics ==
As of 2023, Carey's career total of 727 goals ranks him equal 20th in VFL/AFL history, and his 671 goals for North Melbourne is the club record.

Legend
G	Goals	K	Kicks	D	Disposals	T	Tackles
B	Behinds	H	Handballs	M	Marks

Season	Team	No.	Games	Totals							Averages (per game)						
Season	Team	No.	Games	G	B	K	H	D	M	T	G	B	K	H	D	M	T
1989	North Melbourne	40	4	0	2	26	8	34	14	4	0.0	0.5	6.5	2.0	8.5	3.5	1.0
1990	North Melbourne	18	21	38	23	196	94	290	98	18	1.8	1.1	9.3	4.5	13.8	4.7	0.9
1991	North Melbourne	18	14	28	21	132	56	188	84	10	2.0	1.5	9.4	4.0	13.4	6.0	0.7
1992	North Melbourne	18	21	46	32	278	107	385	157	26	2.2	1.5	13.2	5.1	18.3	7.5	1.2
1993	North Melbourne	18	19	64	44	216	123	339	150	21	3.4	2.3	11.4	6.5	17.8	7.9	1.1
1994	North Melbourne	18	19	63	42	237	116	353	164	13	3.3	2.2	12.5	6.1	18.6	8.6	0.7
1995	North Melbourne	18	25	65	46	309	143	452	187	28	2.6	1.8	12.4	5.7	18.1	7.5	1.1
1996†	North Melbourne	18	25	82	55	332	154	486	200	31	3.3	2.2	13.3	6.2	19.4	8.0	1.2
1997	North Melbourne	18	14	25	15	160	66	226	74	14	1.8	1.1	11.4	4.7	16.1	5.3	1.0
1998	North Melbourne	18	25	80	49	368	121	489	193	40	3.2	2.0	14.7	4.8	19.6	7.7	1.6
1999†	Kangaroos	18	20	76	39	253	100	353	145	33	3.8	2.0	12.7	5.0	17.7	7.3	1.7
2000	Kangaroos	18	23	69	37	336	86	422	176	35	3.0	1.6	14.6	3.7	18.3	7.7	1.5
2001	Kangaroos	18	14	35	11	137	37	174	69	13	2.5	0.8	9.8	2.6	12.4	4.9	0.9
2003	Adelaide	2	16	29	19	136	35	171	62	21	1.8	1.2	8.5	2.2	10.7	3.9	1.3
2004	Adelaide	2	12	27	22	101	26	127	57	12	2.3	1.8	8.4	2.2	10.6	4.8	1.0
Career			272	727	457	3217	1272	4489	1830	319	2.7	1.7	11.8	4.7	16.5	6.7	1.2

== Post-playing career ==
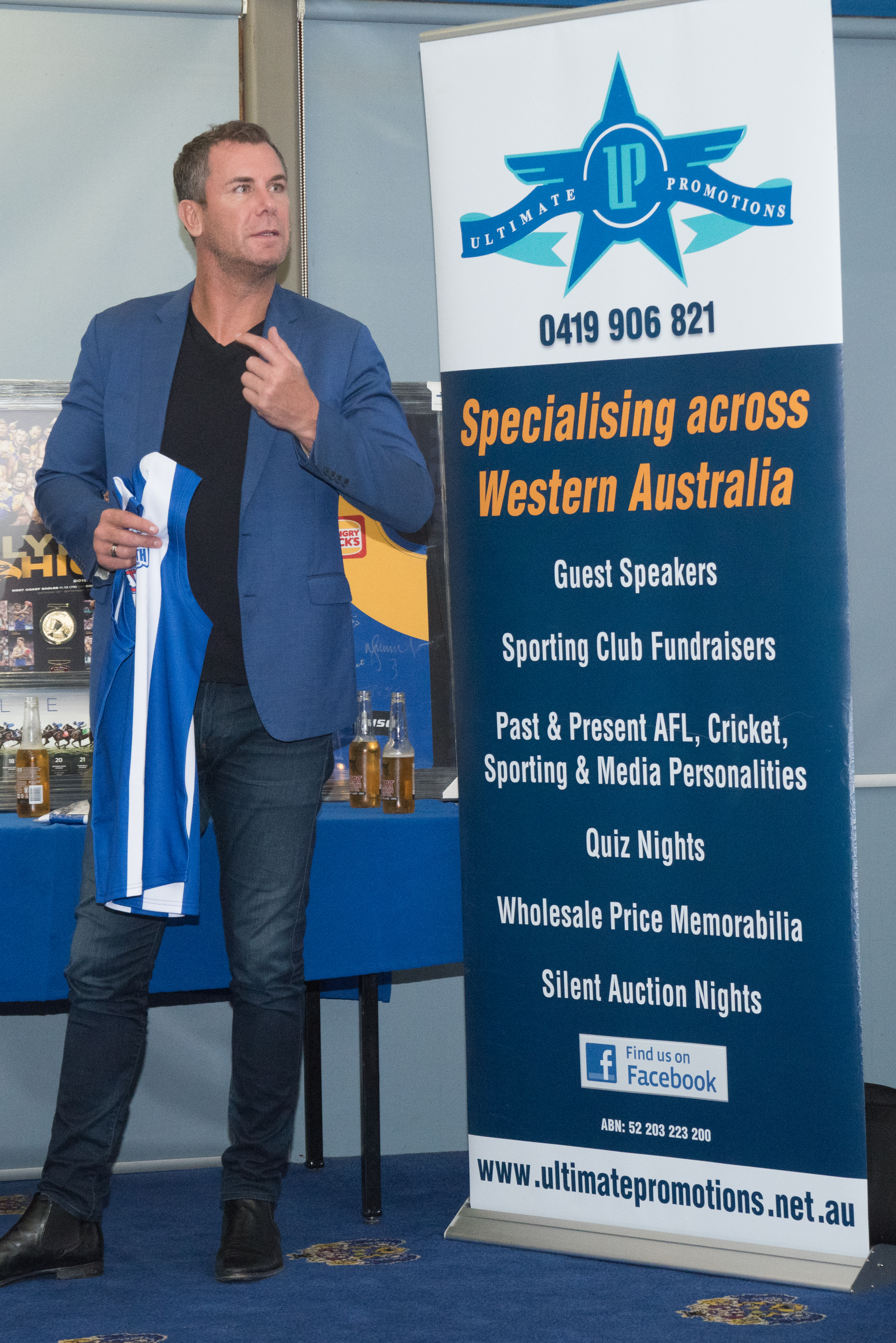
Wayne Carey speaking at an event in July 2019

In early 2005, Carey agreed to assist former coach and mentor Denis Pagan at the Carlton Football Club, acting voluntarily as a part-time skills coach. In 2006 he was an assistant coach at Collingwood Football Club. Carey also worked as a commentator and host of shows on the Fox Footy Channel throughout the 2006 season. In 2007 he participated in the Nine Network football analysis program Footy Classified, as well as special comments for radio station 3AW's football coverage. Subsequent to his dual arrests for domestic violence and assault he was sacked from both positions.

In 2009, Carey was approached in a confidential meeting with influential North Melbourne board member Ron Joseph to return to the club as coach in a succession plan which also involved Malcolm Blight. Carey confirmed this when queried by noted football journalist Damian Barrett in May 2021.

== Controversies ==
Carey has had a string of scandals besides the aforementioned extramarital affair with Anthony Stevens' wife.

In 1997, Carey pleaded guilty to indecent assault after grabbing a passing woman's breast on a Melbourne city street after 12 hours of drinking with teammates. He allegedly told her, "Why don't you get a bigger pair of tits". Carey later settled out of court when the woman filed a civil suit against him.

In 2000, Carey provided character evidence for Jason Moran, an infamous gangster who was subsequently murdered in Melbourne's gang war.

In 2004, while holidaying with his then wife, Carey was subject to arrest for a misdemeanour battery report while holidaying in Las Vegas. He was placed in custody for one night then released. The local District Attorney elected not to pursue the case.

Carey again became the subject of public comment in February 2006 when he announced he was leaving his pregnant wife Sally for model Kate Neilson. His daughter Ella was born six weeks later. In December 2006, Neilson allegedly reported Carey to Australian police for domestic violence, alleging he had punched her in the face. Neilson and Carey denied this report. Subsequently, US security guard Kyle Banks told the Nine Network's A Current Affair he saw Carey attacking Neilson while working at the exclusive W Hotel in New York City in October 2006. Banks said he saw Carey break a bottle of French champagne over his own head.

On 27 January 2008, Carey was arrested after reports of a disturbance at his Port Melbourne apartment. Police had to subdue Carey with capsicum spray and he was seen handcuffed after allegedly assaulting the officers.

Two days later, the Nine Network announced it would not renew Carey's television contract after it was revealed that Carey had been arrested and charged with assaulting a police officer and Neilson in Miami, Florida, on 27 October 2007, after he allegedly glassed Neilsen in the face and neck with a wine glass. Police Lieutenant Bill Schwartz, however, reported:

When officers went and spoke to him, he immediately was belligerent, starting striking out at the officers, in fact, kicked one of the female officers in the face with his foot, elbowed another one in the side of the face. They had to wrestle him down and handcuff him. When he was in the police car, he used his head as a battering ram and tried to smash a hole between the front compartment of the police car and the prisoner compartment.

To stop Carey harming himself and damaging the car, the officers put him into a leather hobble restraint around his hands and legs. Carey faced up to fifteen years in jail and US$30,000 fines. Additionally, Carey was fired from commentary jobs at 3AW and the Nine Network following the coverage of the two arrests. Ultimately Carey pleaded guilty to assaulting and resisting Miami police. In exchange for his guilty pleas, prosecutors agreed that Carey should only serve 50 hours of community service, attend alcohol- and anger-management classes, serve two years probation, and pay US$500 to a Miami police charity. As a consequence of his criminal record in the United States, Carey was refused an entry visa in October 2009.

In March 2008, Carey publicly revealed he was, for a long period, an abuser of alcohol and cocaine. He was interviewed by Andrew Denton on Enough Rope, where he talked candidly about his life and recent controversies. 1.5 million viewers tuned into the highly publicised interview.

Carey was attempting to visit Barwon Prison in February 2012 to speak to indigenous inmates as part of a mentoring program; however, he was found to have traces of cocaine on his clothing following a routine drug scan. Carey was informed that he could enter the prison if he submitted to a strip search. He declined and left the correctional facility.

On 1 September 2022, according to numerous sources, including The Herald Sun and The Age, Carey was gambling when a Ziploc bag of white powder fell onto a gaming table. Carey denied the substance was illegal, claiming it was a "crushed-up anti-inflammatory". Carey was issued with a "withdrawal of license" notice, which means he cannot attend Crown properties for two years. It saw him ejected from the Crown hotel, where he was staying for the Fremantle–Bulldogs elimination final. This also means that he was unable to attend the 2022 Brownlow Medal count that was held at Crown Palladium in Melbourne.
