= Hamish McLachlan =

Australian sports broadcaster (born 1975)

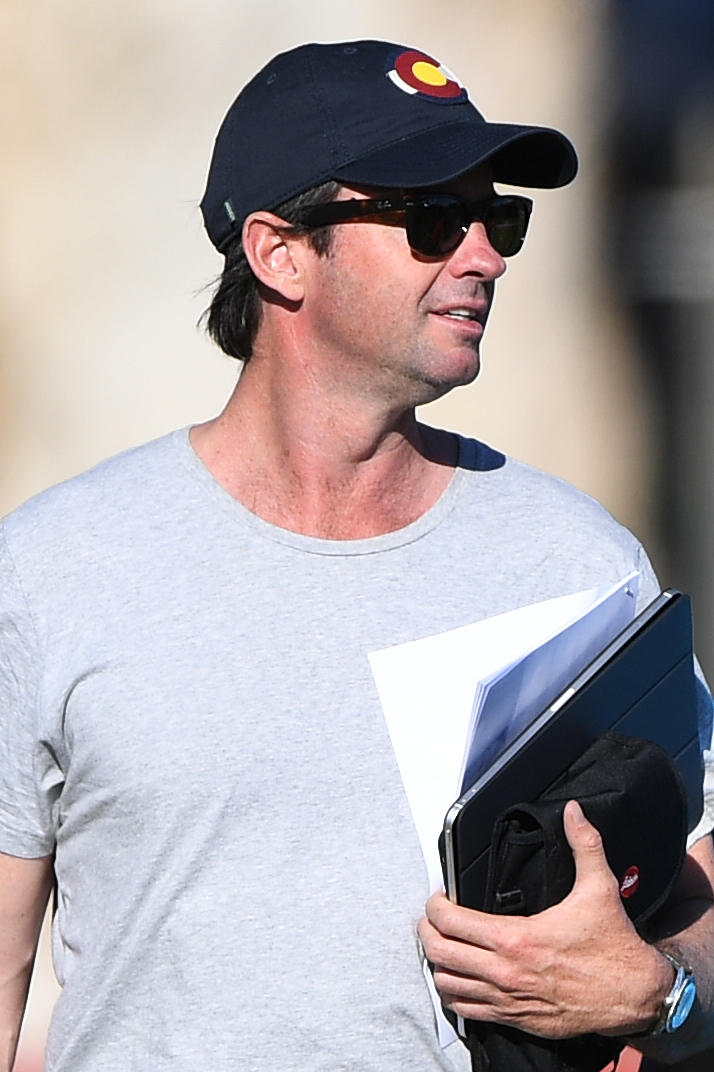
- McLachlan in July 2019
- Born: 28 August 1975 (age 51); Adelaide, South Australia
- Education: St Peter's College, Adelaide
- Occupation: Sports broadcaster
- Years active: 2006−present
- Employer: Seven Network
- Spouse: Sophie McLachlan (m. 2010)

Hamish Angus McLachlan (born 28 August 1975) is an Australian sports broadcaster with Seven Sport.

Since joining Seven Sport in 2008, McLachlan has covered multiple events including the Australian Football League (AFL), the Australian Open, the Olympics and the Commonwealth Games. He also hosted AFL Game Day (2008-2020) and co-hosted Australian Spartan (2018-2019).

== Early career ==
Hank McLachlan began working in sports management in 1998, with Elite Sports Properties (ESP). As general manager of the Events and Entertainment Division, he was involved in multiple different sporting events, including the 2000 Summer Olympics, the 2002 Winter Olympics, the 2002 FIFA World Cup, and the 2002 Commonwealth Games.

In 2004, McLachlan became a director of the Australian Football Hall of Fame and Sensation exhibition in Melbourne. This was placed into administration two months after opening due to outstanding debts. He had previously co-founded Spyglass Management, which was awarded the licence to operate the Hall of Fame. In November 2004, the Federal Court of Australia described Spyglass Management as "hopelessly insolvent", with "many creditors, whose debts in aggregate exceed $26 million".

== Media career ==
In January 2008, McLachlan joined Seven Sport to cover the Australian tennis season, most notably the Australian Open. His roles included conducting live interviews and filming pieces with players on the courts. In 2011, McLachlan became a host presenting the afternoon sessions, and in 2013 he took over from Johanna Griggs as anchor of the prime time sessions, a role he held until 2018.

In March 2008, McLachlan started hosting sports program AFL Game Day, an Australian Rules Football review panel television show on Sunday mornings. He also took up a role at Triple M radio as a match-day commentator, calling Saturday-night and Sunday-afternoon AFL matches. He co-hosted the 2009 and 2011 Brownlow Medal 'Blue Carpet' ceremonies with Seven News presenter, Rebecca Maddern, and fellow Seven Sport presenter, Rachel Finch, respectively.

Later in 2008, he called the Spring Racing Carnival for Triple M and he went on to become a presenter on the Seven Network's coverage of the Melbourne Cup Carnival, as well as other race days during the Spring, Autumn and Magic Millions Racing Carnivals.

Outside of Australian rules football and horse racing, McLachlan has been involved in calling polo matches. He owns Ten Goals, a small media and production unit specialising in "sports broadcasting, commentary, hosting and multimedia presentations".

In 2012, McLachlan became part of the Seven Network's AFL team, initially as co-commentator of Saturday afternoon matches with Basil Zempilas. In 2015, he began calling Sunday afternoon matches with Dennis Cometti (and later Brian Taylor). McLachlan went on to host the network's Friday night telecasts, with pre-game and post-game analysis alongside expert commentators. In 2021, McLachlan moved to co-commentating Saturday night matches alongside Luke Darcy, and Thursday night matches with Jason Bennett from 2022.

In January 2016, McLachlan created controversy and received criticism following an on-air incident when he was pushed away by fill-in weather presenter and Miss Universe Australia, Monika Radulovic, after he hugged her during a live cross to the Magic Millions horse racing event. He later apologised to Radulovic and viewers on air.

Later in 2016, McLachlan joined the Seven Network's Olympics coverage team as a host at the 2016 Summer Olympics. He went on to host coverage of the 2018 Winter Olympics, the 2018 Commonwealth Games, the 2021 Tokyo Olympics, the 2022 Winter Olympics and the 2022 Commonwealth Games.

In 2018, McLachlan co-hosted sports entertainment series Australian Spartan. The series was cancelled after 2 seasons.

He has written for the Herald Sun newspaper in Melbourne.

== Personal life ==
McLachlan was originally from North Adelaide, South Australia, and attended St Peter's College and the University of Adelaide, where he graduated with a degree in commerce. His older brother Gillon McLachlan was Chief Executive Officer of the AFL between 2014 and 2023.

He is married to Sophie and has three children, Milla, Indi and Lexi.

In 2016, McLachlan was hospitalised after being trampled by a horse. He suffered 6 broken ribs and a collapsed lung.

In 2020, in an AFL-sanctioned mini-series called Last Time I Cried, McLachlan revealed that his baby Milla was born with West Syndrome and given a 10% chance of surviving without severe brain damage or succumbing to her affliction. Milla had to be given multiple doses of steroids. After six months, Doctor Jeremy Freeman of the Children's Private Medical Group told McLachlan that he was confident that Milla would make a full recovery, which she did.

After the Seven Network lost the rights to Paris 2024 Summer Olympics, McLachlan moved to France for a year with his family in 2024.
