= The Footy Show (AFL) =

AFL television program

- Genre: Sports; variety
- Opening theme: "More Than a Game" by Chris Doheny
- Country of origin: Australia
- Original language: English
- No. of seasons: 26
- No. of episodes: 736 (list of episodes)

Production
- Production locations: Melbourne, Victoria; GTV9
- Running time: 120 minutes (including commercials)

Original release
- Network: Nine Network
- Release: 24 March 1994 – 25 September 2019

The Footy Show is an Australian sports and variety entertainment television program which aired on the Nine Network. The show was dedicated to the Australian Football League (AFL) and Australian rules football. The show featured a panel of hosts and a rotating regular panel of guests.

Under the show's initial format, which ran from 1994 to 2018, The Footy Show was variously hosted by Eddie McGuire, Sam Newman, Trevor Marmalade, Garry Lyon, James Brayshaw, Rebecca Maddern and Craig Hutchison, with changes to the line-up throughout, and won eight Logie Awards for Most Popular Sports Program.

In December 2018, McGuire announced that the show would continue as a newly formatted show from 2019 and that he and Newman, the show's original hosts, would host several specials throughout the year. However, on 9 May 2019, seven episodes into the new season and less than an hour after that evening's episode had aired, the Nine Network announced that the show would be cancelled due to poor ratings for the show. The show was hosted by Anthony Lehmann, Neroli Meadows, Brendan Fevola and Dylan Alcott in 2019.

On 21 June 2019, McGuire announced that he and Newman, plus Marmalade and Maddern appearing as guests would do a farewell Grand Final show 25.5 years after the show's first episode. It was filmed at Rod Laver Arena on 25 September.

== Origins and format ==
The Footy Show had its origins in 1993 when a special Grand Final edition of The Sunday Footy Show aired on the Thursday night before the AFL Grand Final (the name deriving from the diminutive form of the word football commonly used in Australian English). The program was then extended and started as a regular program in 1994 hosted by former Network Ten reporter Eddie McGuire, former Geelong player Sam Newman, and comedian Trevor Marmalade. They were usually joined by three current and former football players in a panel format. The show was broadcast live from Melbourne with a large studio audience "warmed up" each week by MC and comedian Michael Pope. From 1994 to 2010 (Seasons 1 to 17), the show was broadcast from Studio 9 at GTV 9 in Richmond. Following GTV 9's relocation to Docklands at the start of 2011 to 2019—rom Season 18 to Season 26—the show was produced from Sound Stage 4 at Docklands Film Studios.

Over the years, the show has also broadcast special live episodes from various locations, including Geelong, Sydney, Perth, Adelaide, Hobart, London (2001 and 2004) and Munich (2006).

In 2006, after McGuire's appointment as CEO of the Nine Network, he stepped down as host of the program and was replaced by former Melbourne player Garry Lyon and North Melbourne Football Club director, later chairman, James Brayshaw, as co-hosts. In a bid to reinvigorate the show in 2009, Trevor Marmalade was cut from the program to make way for former footballers Shane Crawford and Billy Brownless. In 2012, former Essendon player Matthew Lloyd was brought in, with Lloyd, Crawford and Brownless rotating each week.

The panelists discussed any news stories which arose during the week, reviewed the last round of matches, and previewed each match for the upcoming week, including showing the lineups. Before 2001, no footage of any AFL games could be aired by the show, as rival station Seven Network held the broadcast rights and refused to allow the show to air footage in an attempt to stall the program's success. From 2002 until 2006, Nine had the rights to AFL broadcasts, and footage was used liberally during the show. From 2007, they reverted to not using any game footage due to Nine having lost the rights to AFL broadcasting to the Seven Network and Network Ten until the end of the 2011 football season. From 2012 until the show's 2019 termination, footage was used from Fox Footy, who broadcast all of the AFL games every weekend.

The show's iconic logo is based on a famous photo of VFL legend Jack Dyer.

== Presenters ==
- Eddie McGuire (1994–2005, 2017–2018, 2019 finale)
- Sam Newman (1994–2018, 2019 finale)
- Trevor Marmalade (1994–2008)
- James Brayshaw (2006–2016)
- Garry Lyon (2006–2015)
- Rebecca Maddern (2016–2018)
- Craig Hutchison (2017)
- Dylan Alcott (2019)
- Brendan Fevola (2019)
- Anthony Lehmann (2019)
- Neroli Meadows (2019)

== Scheduling ==
The AFL version of the show aired every Thursday.

VIC, TAS, SA, & WA

- Thursday Night: 8:30pm on Nine
- Sunday Morning: 10am on Nine

NSW, QLD, ACT, & NT

- Thursday Night: 11:30pm on Nine
- Sunday Morning: 10am on 9Gem

From 1994 to 2012, The Footy Show usually aired at 9.30 pm AEST. However, from 28 November 2012 to 9 May 2019, Nine announced that the show would air at 8.30 pm AEST.

=== Thursday ===
In Victoria, Tasmania, South Australia and Western Australia, the show aired on Thursday nights at 8:30 pm during the AFL season.

In 2008, the AFL version of The Footy Show could be seen live into most New South Wales and Queensland TV markets via the Nine HD channel. However, this was discontinued before the launch of GO! when Nine HD ceased breakaway programming. Since then, the show aired at 11.30pm.

=== Sunday ===
A related program, The Sunday Footy Show (AFL), continues to air between 10.00 am and 12.00 pm on Sunday mornings.

== Segments throughout the show's run ==
- Almost Football Legends—(Formerly by Crawford/Brownless/Marmalade). Showcases local footy highlights (such as big marks, great goals, and unusual occurrences). Originally started so that some football footage would be shown. It became a talent quest, with the winner receiving a prize, and some players featured in the segment (most notably Russell Robertson) have even been signed up by AFL clubs based on their performances.
- Angry Al—Originally the Gary Coleman Medal, renamed the Gary Coleman Memorial Medal and then the Charlie Sheen Medal, and was later resurrected in homage to volatile Hawthorn coach Alastair Clarkson—a faux medal awarded to the AFL personality who lost their temper in the most major way in the previous week. Footage of other sport flare-ups where also shown as 'nominations'.
- Big Bill House—A one-off segment which aired on the show in 2013, 2014 and 2015. Was introduced in 2013 when Newman, Shane, and Garry all got their certainty tips incorrect in the same round. Big Bill House featured challenges set by Big Bill (Brownless) which were often humorous and stupid.
- The Wheel—Brownless goes around to local footy clubs to have a competition where they won what would come up on the wheel. This segment came back in 2018 for only a couple of episodes.
- Street Talk (by Newman)—A satirical take on vox pop by interviewing and making fun of various characters on the streets of cities around Australia. Brownless, Crawford or Brendan Fevola fill in as host of this segment when Newman was unable to fulfill his position.
- The Footy Show Stakes (cartoon Andrew Fyfe)—A satirical animation sending up the weekly events in football in the form of a horse race (Formerly known as Fyfe's Footy Flicks).
- Sam's Mailbag—Newman reads and answers letters sent in by viewers of the show.
- 2018 Sam's Mailbag changed its name, with Newman reading social media post from the shows Facebook or Twitter or Instagram and his own Instagram or Twitter
- Fyfe's Footy Flicks (by cartoonist Andrew Fyfe)—A satirical animation sending up the weekly events in football.
- MARStermind—Each week McGuire would quiz someone. It was a football-themed pub-style quiz named after Mars, who sponsored the show.
- Hatchet Jobs—Featured during 2006 towards the end of the show. Footage from coach interviews is chopped up and edited resulting in facetious one-liners.
- House of Bulger—5-minute parody of daytime soap operas featuring Crawford as Hank Bulger; other presenters and AFL stars appear as recurring characters.
- Bulger, MD—The sequel to House of Bulger, ending with Hank being shot dead by Dr. Pink (Nathan Brown) on the Grand Final show.
- Shane's Mailbag—A simple mocking of Sam's Mailbag that occurred occasionally in 2009. Crawford placed a sign in front of himself with the segment's name whilst wearing a wide-brimmed hat and blowing a whistle.
- Pillow Talk (by Brayshaw/Lyon)—Wives or girlfriends of AFL footballers are interviewed.
- Under The Pump—A member of the panel would be asked poignant questions by other panellists and presenters, with a bike pump lowered above them for comedic effect.
- That's What I'm Talkin' About (by Crawford/Chris Sheedy)—Recurring segment in 2009. Crawford attempted to beat various Guinness World Records. Records that have been broken include kissing 96 people in 60 seconds and having 153 spiders crawl on his body for 30 seconds.
- Pardon My Puzzle (by Brayshaw/Lyon)—Recurring segment in 2011. A sequence of images is displayed from which Newman and the panel must "piece together" the answer. Usually (but not always) they are the names of AFL players and coaches, and the images are often amusing. Examples include: Dick Clay (penis made of clay), Drew Petrie (Drew Carey + a kid peeing on tree) John Schultz (a picture of a toilet [also known as a john] + a picture of Sergeant Schultz), and Scott Camporeale (A Scot + a camper + a rally).
- Hughesy's Spray—Involves Hughes attending a selected team's training and 'stirring them up' with humorous asides about their club and various players. This was similar to the BTG Super Spray (also done by Hughes on Before The Game)

=== Grand Final spectacular ===
Commencing in 1996, The Grand Final edition of the show was broadcast live from the Rod Laver Arena annually on the Thursday night before the AFL Grand Final in front of a crowd of around 12,000. The show includes the AFL Players Revue in which players dress up and dance to themes.

Despite the cancellation of the weekly show earlier in 2019, Eddie, Sam, Trevor and Garry did the last-ever Footy Show Grand Final edition, which aired on 25 September 2019, looking back at the show's 25½-year history.

== Awards ==
The Footy Show was nominated for the Logie Award for Most Popular Sports Program each year between 1996–98 and 2000–2018 (with no Logie awarded in the category in 1999).

== Criticism and controversy ==
Sam Newman, regularly a controversial figure during his media career, was by far the most controversial figure on The Footy Show and has been the subject of many complaints to the Nine Network. Some of his most controversial incidents on The Footy Show include:

- Wearing blackface to impersonate legendary Indigenous AFL footballer Nicky Winmar in 1999 after Winmar did not attend a scheduled appearance on the program.
- Having his trousers pulled down by Shane Crawford live on-air in 2001.
- Hitting an unsuspecting David Schwarz with a pie in the face during an appearance on The Footy Show, with Schwarz responding by shoving Newman to the ground.
- Manhandling and groping a lingerie-clad mannequin with journalist Caroline Wilson's face attached to it in 2008 in response to the way Wilson was dressed on Footy Classified. Newman was temporarily suspended by the Nine Network after the incident. Later he faced further ire by calling five female directors of AFL clubs "liars and hypocrites" after they complained about Newman's mannequin skit, leading one of those directors, Susan Alberti, to sue the Nine Network for $220,000.
- Smoking a bong on-air in 2012 after the AFL banned marijuana as a game-day substance; the substance in the bong was later revealed to be tea leaves.
- Describing NFL draftee Michael Sam as "annoyingly gratuitous" in 2014 after the openly homosexual player kissed his boyfriend on live television on being drafted to the NFL.
- In 2015, there were questions raised after Newman made remarks about Mitch Clark's depression issues.
- Referring to transgender celebrity Caitlyn Jenner as "he" and "it" in 2017 (see also: preferred gender pronoun).
- Staging a silent protest and refusing to speak throughout an episode in 2017 after producers refused to allow him to dress up as a woman in response to two senior AFL executives who were exposed having had affairs with junior staffers; the Nine Network responded by taking The Footy Show off air for four weeks, sacking Craig Hutchison as host, and replacing him with Eddie McGuire.
- Ranting about the AFL Commission's decision to publicly support the "yes vote" in the Australian Marriage Law Postal Survey, which would pave the way for legalising same-sex marriage.

Newman also had a number of well-publicised off-screen incidents that were often brought up during the show.

In 2018, on the last live episode for that year, Newman made a nine-minute farewell speech at the top of the show with no one else on set to the audience. Almost immediately after the show went off the air, he was told he would not be a part of it the following year; he had been a part of the show for 25 years. Newman would not appear again until the final grand final spectacular a year later in September 2019, and he would eventually resign from the Nine Network in 2020 after he made controversial comments about George Floyd on a podcast.

== International broadcast ==
The program was previously shown in the United Kingdom and Ireland on Premier Sports the following night on Friday evenings at 8pm and live on Sky Sport in New Zealand on Thursday evenings at 10:30pm.

== See also ==
- List of Australian television series
- List of longest-running Australian television series
