= Caroline Wilson (journalist) =

Australian rules football journalist

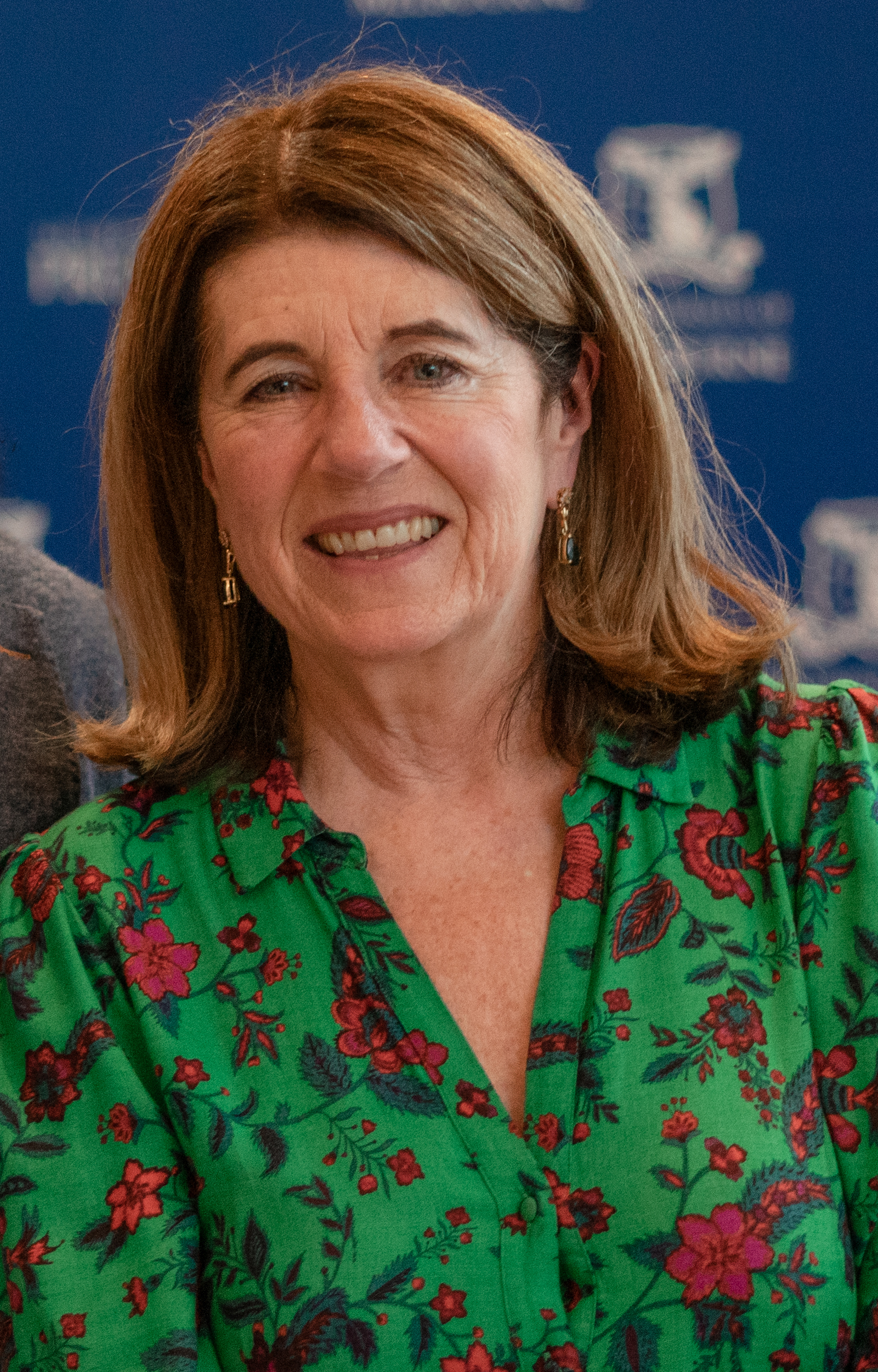
- Wilson in August 2022
- Born: Julia Caroline Wilson; 7 June 1960 (age 66); Melbourne, Victoria, Australia
- Other name: "Caro"
- Occupation: Journalist
- Years active: 1982−present
- Employer(s): Fairfax, 3AW, Seven Network

Julia Caroline Wilson (born 7 June 1960) is an Australian sports journalist. She is a football columnist for Melbourne's The Age newspaper, and she also appears on 3AW's pre-match AFL discussion. She was previously a panellist on Nine Network's Footy Classified, from 2007–2024, and is an occasional panellist on the ABC program Offsiders. As of 2025, she works on Seven Network as an AFL commentator as well as being a panellist on The Agenda Setters.

== Career ==
Wilson began covering football in 1982. She has covered numerous sports, but specialises in the AFL (Australian Football League), and was chief football writer for The Age from 1999 to 2017. Wilson was the first woman to cover Australian Rules football full-time.

Wilson had five years with the Sunday Age between 1989 and 1994. She has also worked in radio as the host of the afternoon program for 3AW between 1994 and 1996. Wilson was also a regular panelist on 7s Talking Footy in the late 1990s early 2000. Wilson appeared every Wednesday night on White Line Fever on Fox Footy, until the show was cancelled in 2006 following the dissolution of the Fox Footy Channel.

From 2007 until 2024, Wilson was a panellist on Nine Network's Footy Classified.

As of 2025, she works on Seven Network as an AFL commentator. She also appears on The Agenda Setters.

== Media awards ==
In 1989, Wilson became the first woman to win the AFL's gold media award. She was the winner of the Sunday Age journalist of the year award in 1993. In 1995 she was the winner of a national RAWARD (now known as the Australian Commercial Radio Awards – ACRA) as best radio current affairs commentator. Wilson was voted the AFL Players' Association's football writer of the year in 1999. She is a multiple winner of AFL Media Association awards, including most outstanding football writer and most outstanding feature writer (2000, 2003, 2005).

In 2010, Wilson was presented with an Australian Sports Commission Media Awards for Lifetime Achievement for her contribution to sports journalism.

In 2013, Wilson won her first Walkley Awards, sharing the 2013 All Media Coverage of a Major News Event or Issue award and winning outright the 2013 All Media Commentary, Analysis, Opinion and Critique award. Both awards related to The Age newspaper coverage of the 2013 Essendon Football Club supplements controversy.

In March 2014, Wilson received the Graham Perkin Australian Journalist of the Year Award at the Melbourne Press Club's annual Quill awards. The award was presented to Wilson for her coverage of the Essendon Football Club supplements saga.

== Personal life ==
Born and raised in Melbourne, Wilson is the daughter of Ian Wilson, who was president of Richmond Football Club from 1974 to 1985. She is married to former Seven News reporter and the current head of the Victorian Premier's media unit, Brendan Donohoe, and they have three children.
