= Craig Hutchison (broadcaster) =

Australian sports journalist (born 1974)

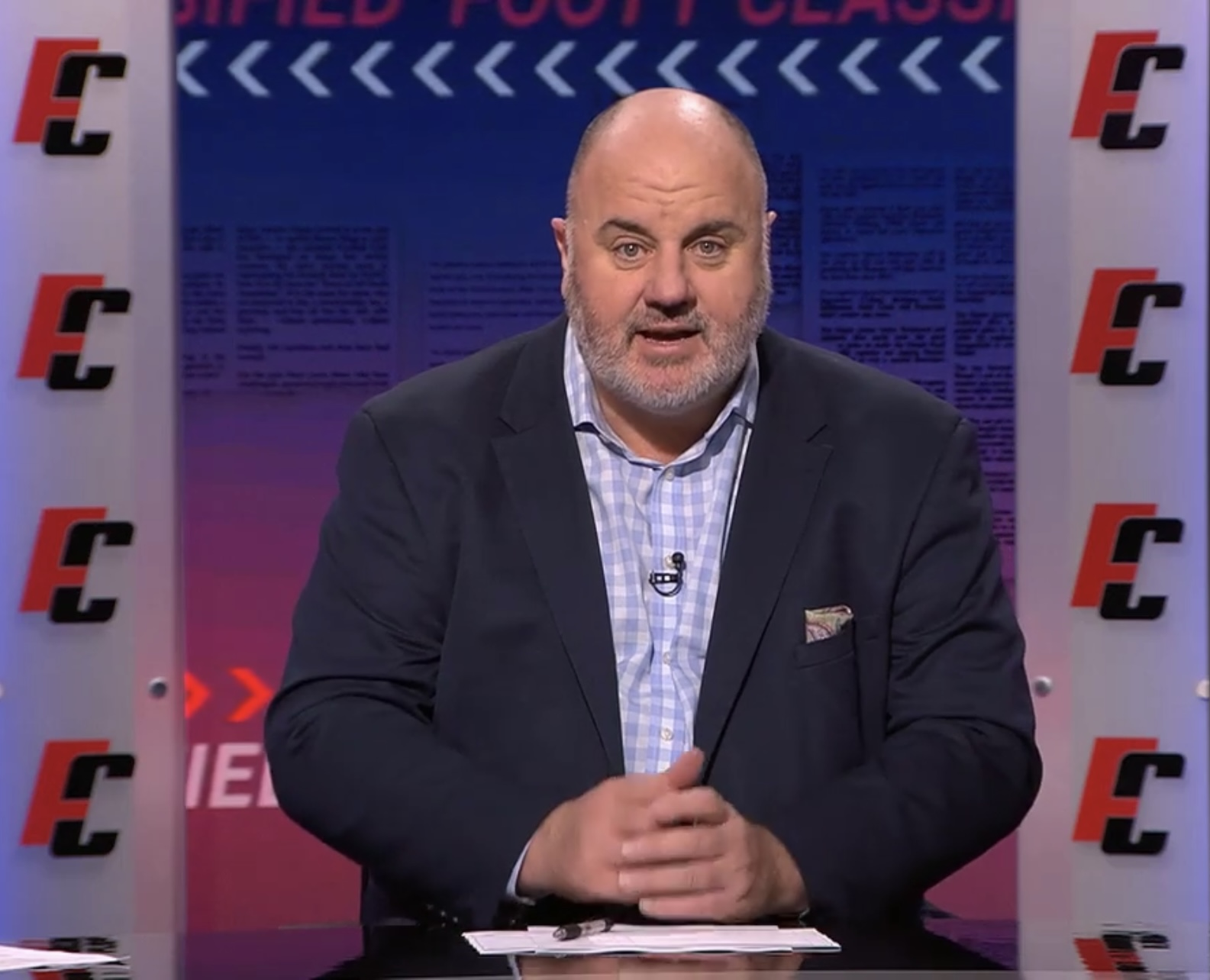
- Hutchison hosting Footy Classified in 2023
- Born: 4 December 1974 (age 51); Warragul, Victoria
- Other name: Hutchy
- Education: Marist-Sion College
- Occupations: Sports journalist; TV presenter; commentator; radio broadcaster; media businessman
- Years active: 1994–present
- Known for: CEO of Sports Entertainment Group; Host of Footy Classified

Craig Hutchison (born 4 December 1974) is an Australian journalist, sports broadcaster and businessman. He is the chief executive officer of Sports Entertainment Group.

== Early life and career ==
Hutchison was born in Warragul in regional Victoria. He commenced his career as a journalist in 1994 as a cadet with the Herald Sun newspaper. Two years later, he moved to Sport 927, where he was producer of the Kevin Bartlett and Dr Turf Big Sports Breakfast Show for approximately one year. He then joined Channel Ten as a journalist and broke sport stories including Neil Balme's sacking at the Melbourne Football Club as senior coach, Alastair Lynch's drug hearing with the AFL, and the subsequent resignation of the Brisbane Lions chairman following the story.

== Television career ==
=== Seven Network ===
In 1999, he joined the Seven Network and was promoted to chief football reporter, appearing on the nationally broadcast Sportsworld every Sunday. He was also 'fill-in' sports anchor for Seven News. He also worked in commentary as a caller in 2001.

=== Controversy ===
In 2004, he was at the centre of controversy when he wrongfully said St Kilda player Justin Koschitzke was being interviewed by police in relation to sexual misconduct allegations. Hutchison said Koschitzke and teammate Stephen Milne were involved, when it was actually allegedly Milne and Leigh Montagna. Channel Seven was forced to issue an apology to St Kilda and Koschitzke, and they issued a retraction. Milne and Montagna were subsequently advised by Victoria Police that no charges would be laid.

=== Nine Network ===
In 2007, Hutchison left the Seven Network to join Channel Nine's football team. He became host of Nine's newly-introduced talk show Footy Classified. He was also appointed as a reporter for The Footy Show, The Sunday Footy Show, and National Nine News.

In 2011, Hutchison played for Victoria in the annual EJ Whitten Legends Game kicking a banana goal from nearly 40 metres out. As of 2022, a video of the goal has been viewed in excess of 1.8 million times on YouTube alone. Hutchison scored two goals in the game.

Hutchison became host of The Sunday Footy Show in 2013 and then co-host of The Footy Show in 2017.

=== Return to Seven Network ===
In 2025, he will return to the Seven Network.

== Radio career ==
Hutchison joined Triple M in 1997, and two years later he co-hosted the top-rating Ralphy and Hutch show, and he called AFL games every Saturday night from 1997 to 2005. Hutchison has shared Sundays with Sam Newman, James Brayshaw, Stephen Quartermain and Jason Dunstall, providing a preview of the day's game.

In 2006, he joined 3AW's football commentary team with Rex Hunt. In June 2007, Hutchison was sacked from 3AW. Management of the radio station took the action following a ratings plummet for its Saturday night football coverage.

In March 2008, Hutchison joined 1116 SEN and, since 2009, co-hosts Off The Bench on Saturday morning with Liam Pickering and Dr Turf.

== Sports Entertainment Group ==
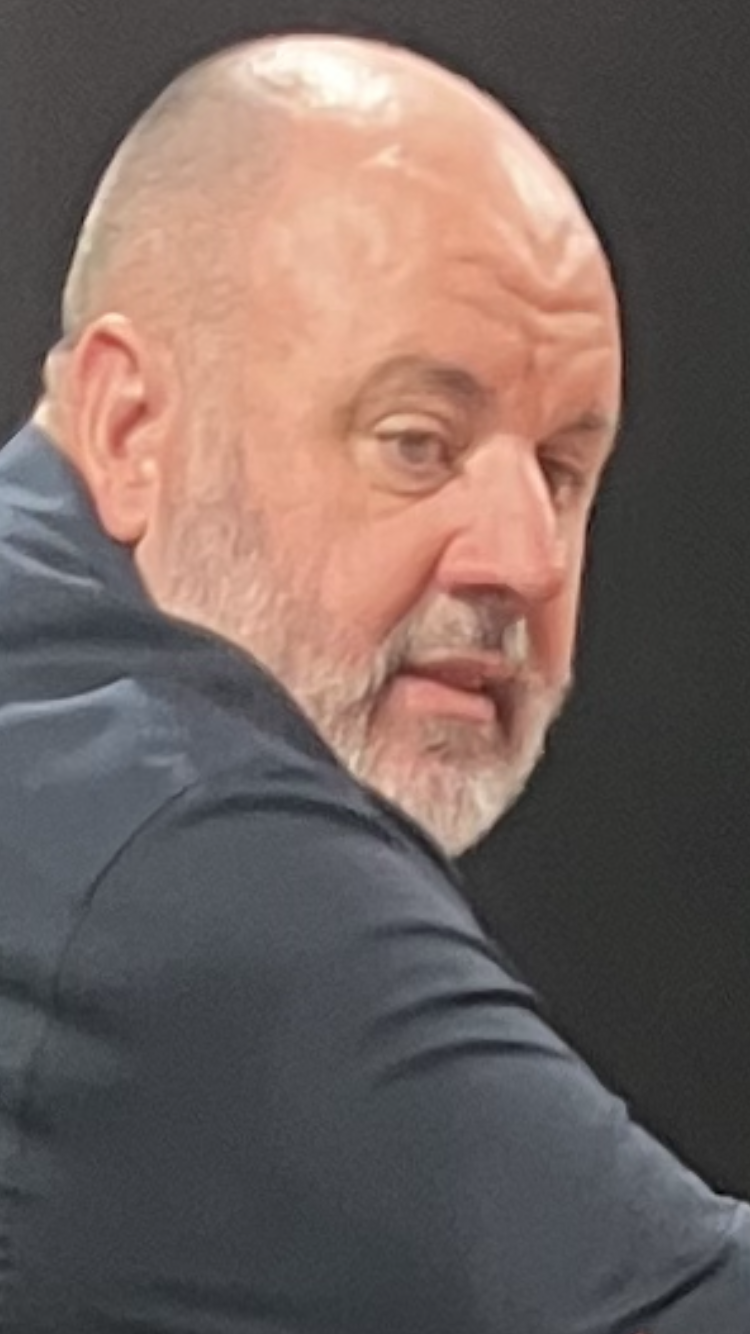
Hutchison in 2022

In 2006, Hutchison co-founded Crocmedia. In 2018, Pacific Star Network acquired Crocmedia. Hutchison subsequently became CEO of the merged company. In 2020, Crocmedia was rebranded as Sports Entertainment Network and Pacific Star Network was rebranded as Sports Entertainment Group. As of November 2023, he was on a $550,000 annual salary with SEN and was the company's second-largest shareholder.

In August 2024, after SEG sold the Perth Wildcats to Mark Arena, Hutchison joined the new Wildcats board.

== Awards ==
Hutchison has been the recipient of many awards. These include being five-time winner of the AFL Media Association Awards' 'Best Electronic News Reporter' and winning a Quill (Victorian Journalism Award) for Best TV News Report in 2002.
