= Garry Lyon =

Australian rules footballer, born 1967

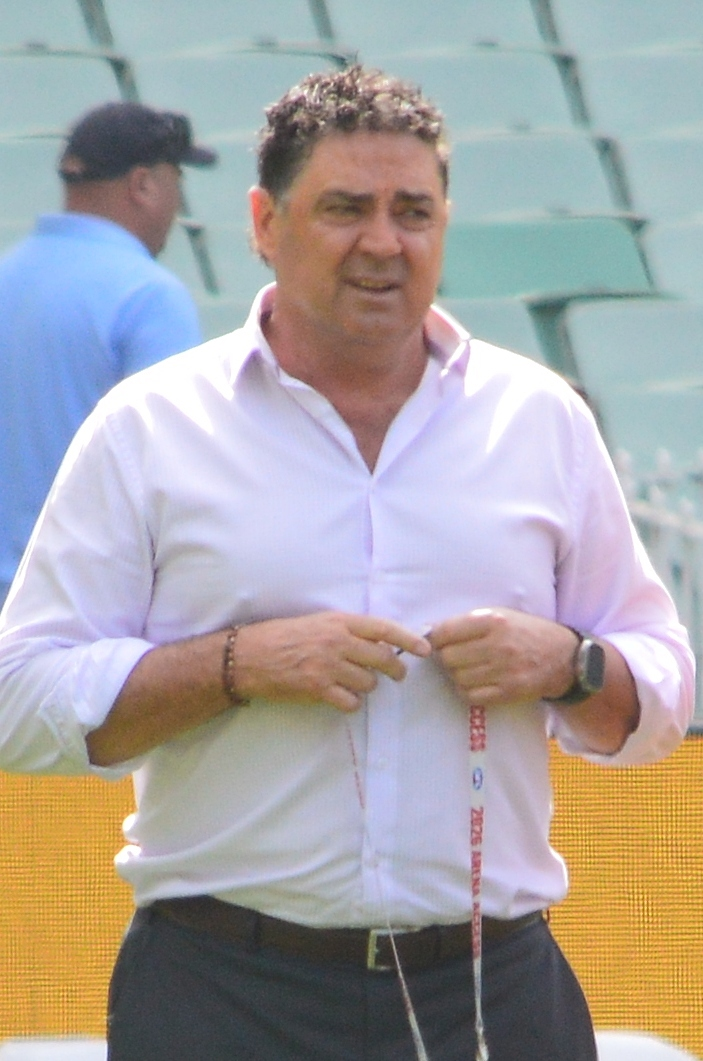
- Lyon in March 2026

Personal information
- Full name: Garry Peter Lyon
- Born: 13 September 1967 (age 59); Devonport, Tasmania
- Original team: Kyabram (GVFL)
- Height: 193 cm (6 ft 4 in)
- Weight: 96 kg (212 lb)
- Position: Centre half-forward

Playing career
Years	Club	Games (Goals)
1986–1999	Melbourne	226 (426)

Representative team honours
Years	Team	Games (Goals)
1988–1995	Victoria	10 (9)

Coaching career
Years	Club	Games (W–L–D)
2001–2004	Australia	8 (2–5–1)

Career highlights
- Club: 2× Keith 'Bluey' Truscott Medal: 1990, 1994; 2× Melbourne leading goalkicker: 1994, 1995; 5x All-Australian Team: 1989, 1990, 1993, 1994, 1995; 10 goals in a final: 1994; Australian Football Media Association Player of the Year; Melbourne captain: 1991–1997; Harold Ball Memorial Trophy: 1986; Melbourne Team of the Century – Half-forward flank; Melbourne Hall of Fame; Australian Football Hall of Fame, inducted 2025; Representative: Victoria captain: 1994

Garry Peter Lyon (born 13 September 1967) is a former professional Australian rules football player and was captain of the Melbourne Football Club in the Australian Football League (AFL). Since his retirement from football, he has been mainly an Australian rules football media personality, featuring on television, radio and in newspapers. He has also coached during the International Rules Series. He is the most recent VFL/AFL player to kick ten goals in a finals match, having done so in the 1994 Second Semi-final against Footscray.

== Early life ==
Lyon, the son of former Hawthorn player Peter Lyon, was born in Devonport, Tasmania. In his youth he moved to Victoria. He grew up in the Victorian town of Kyabram and played local football for Kyabram Bombers. His talent saw him scouted by the Melbourne Football Club as a zoned player. He completed his schooling at Melbourne High School after moving to Melbourne in his later years of school to pursue his sporting ambitions.

== Career ==
=== VFL/AFL ===
Lyon was recruited from the Kyabram Football Club and debuted in 1986 with the Melbourne Football Club, playing in the 1988 VFL Grand Final. He quickly became a dominant player in the Victorian Football League (VFL), later renamed the Australian Football League (AFL), winning his first Melbourne best and fairest award in 1990. He became Melbourne's captain in 1991 and eventually became the longest-serving Melbourne captain in club history until he was released from the role after the 1997 season due to the club's belief that he would suffer from too many injuries. Lyon was known for playing with many back injuries, and his presence on the field despite such adversity saw him as an inspiration to teammates.

Lyon finished his career having won two Melbourne best and fairest awards and being named in five All-Australian teams. His career ended as a result of increasing back problems. A broken leg, footage of which was often played on The AFL Footy Show, ended his 1987 season. In the end, he finished with 226 VFL/AFL games and 426 goals in 1999, giving him the fourth-best all-time goal tally for a Melbourne player.

=== State of Origin ===
Lyon had a successful State of Origin career for Victoria, first being selected in 1988 against Western Australia. In 1989 he played in a famous game against South Australia, where Tony Lockett, Jason Dunstall and Dermott Brereton all played in the same forward line, performing well being named in the best players. In 1991, Lyon scored one goal against South Australia. He was selected again in 1992 against the same opposition. In 1993, he performed on the big stage in the State of Origin Carnival grand final against South Australia, kicking three goals and being named in the best players. In 1994, he was named Captain of Victoria, in what he has described as "a great honour". In 1995, he was named vice-captain against South Australia, scoring one goal. Lyon is a big supporter of Victoria and State of Origin and has said in reference to playing State of Origin that he "loved it". He is also a big supporter of State of Origin being reintroduced, and he has described training and playing with the best players in the game as a "dream come true" and "it took the experience of playing football to another level". He has said that the great players of today should be afforded the same honour.

== Media career ==
Lyon's media career began in the early 1990s when he hosted the AFL-themed children's program AFL Squadron. He moved into radio in the late 1990s on 3AW, and in 2004 he hosted Morning Glory on SEN 1116. In 2005, he returned to 3AW, and he appeared on Sports Today as well as providing special comments for the station's AFL coverage. In 2007, Lyon moved to Triple M where he provided special comments on Friday Night and Saturday afternoon matches until the end of 2015.

Lyon became a regular panelist on The AFL Footy Show late in his playing career. In 2006, alongside James Brayshaw, he took the hosting reins of the program after Eddie McGuire became CEO of the Nine Network. Previously he had worked alongside Brayshaw on The Sunday Footy Show and in 2005 on Any Given Sunday, as well as being a presenter of the Melbourne Commonwealth Games 2006 coverage on Nine. In 2007 he became a panelist on the program Footy Classified.

Lyon is a columnist for The Age newspaper and has co-authored children's books, including those in the Specky Magee series with Felice Arena.

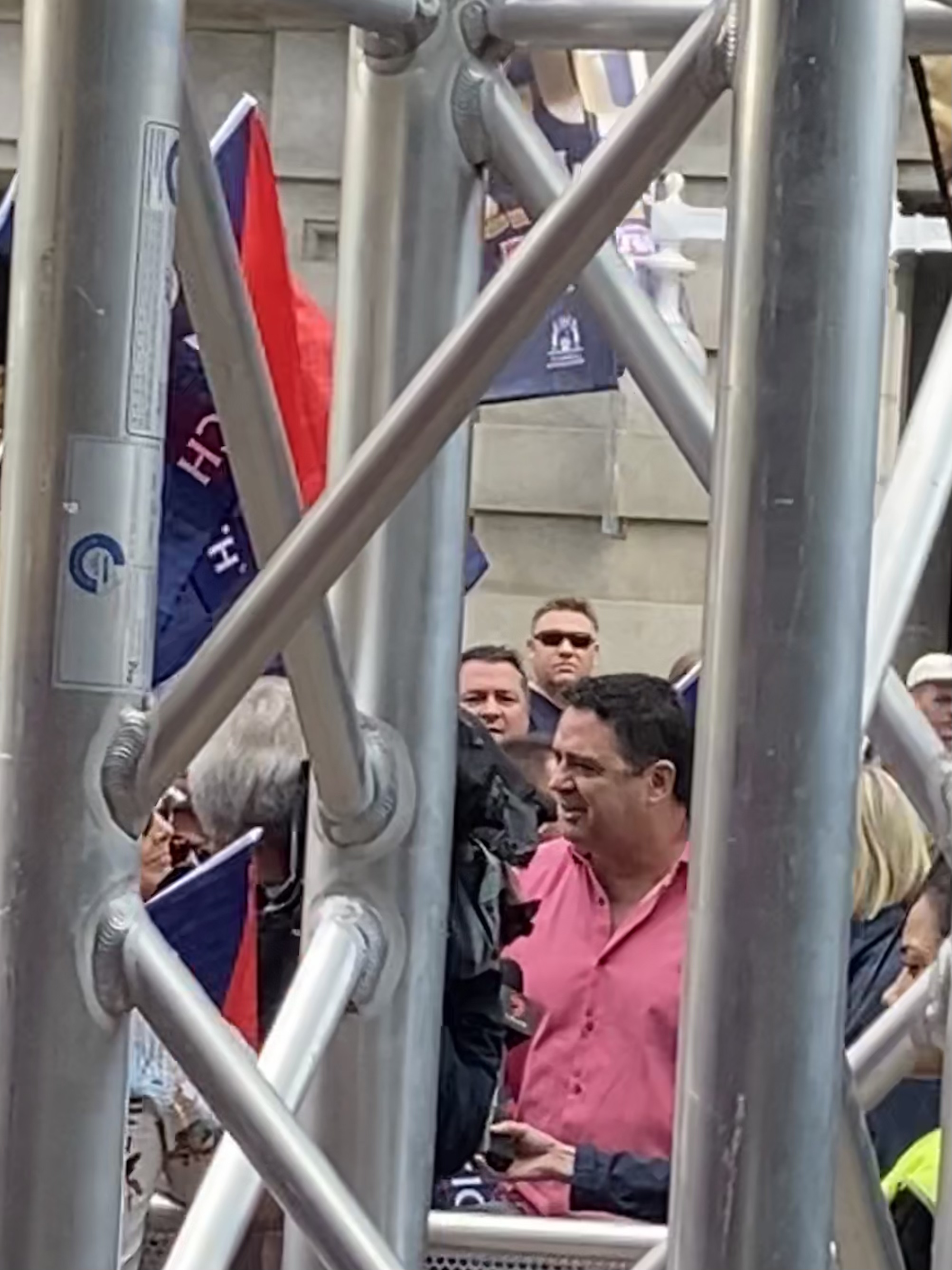
Lyon during Melbourne premiership celebration ceremony in Perth in 2021.

In 2017, Lyon returned to SEN to co-host its breakfast program with Tim Watson. Later that year, Lyon ended his long association with the Nine Network to join Fox Footy as a commentator and panelist on On The Couch. In 2022, Lyon commenced hosting On The Couch in addition to Friday Night Football for the station. In 2025, Lyon commenced co-hosting AFL 360 on Fox Footy alongside Gerard Whateley.

Following the Melbourne premiership win, Lyon had the honour of presenting the 2021 AFL premiership cup to captain Max Gawn and coach Simon Goodwin in Perth following the Demons winning their first flag in 57 years.

== Coaching ==
Since his retirement, Lyon has dabbled in coaching. He has coached the Australia international rules football team, debuting in 2001, and he remained coach for four successive seasons before being replaced by Kevin Sheedy. His International rules record is two wins from four series.

While many thought he might be a future coach of the Melbourne Football Club, Lyon chose not to pursue this path. In 2009, he coached the Victorian under-16 representative side at the AFL championships.

== Playing statistics ==
**Brownlow Medal votes**
Season	Votes
1986	3
1987	1
1988	—
1989	3
1990	9
1991	—
1992	—
1993	5
1994	10
1995	9
1996	—
1997	—
1998	—
1999	—
**Total**	**40**
Key:
Green / **Bold** = Won

Legend
G	Goals	K	Kicks	D	Disposals	T	Tackles
B	Behinds	H	Handballs	M	Marks

Season	Team	No.	Games	Totals							Averages (per game)						
Season	Team	No.	Games	G	B	K	H	D	M	T	G	B	K	H	D	M	T
1986	Melbourne	3	20	26	18	215	65	280	70	—N/a	1.3	0.9	10.8	3.3	14.0	3.5	—N/a
1987	Melbourne	3	18	28	20	189	76	265	69	21	1.6	1.1	10.5	4.2	14.7	3.8	1.2
1988	Melbourne	3	22	41	30	278	82	360	110	43	1.9	1.4	12.6	3.7	16.4	5.0	2.0
1989	Melbourne	3	15	20	12	230	57	287	89	18	1.3	0.8	15.3	3.8	19.1	5.9	1.2
1990	Melbourne	3	21	13	9	284	89	373	104	47	0.6	0.4	13.5	4.2	17.8	5.0	2.2
1991	Melbourne	3	18	11	11	235	125	360	79	39	0.6	0.6	13.1	6.9	20.0	4.4	2.2
1992	Melbourne	3	16	30	14	211	101	312	84	34	1.9	0.9	13.2	6.3	19.5	5.3	2.1
1993	Melbourne	3	18	36	37	242	100	342	120	17	2.0	2.1	13.4	5.6	19.0	6.7	0.9
1994	Melbourne	3	24	79	47	295	80	375	151	36	3.3	2.0	12.3	3.3	15.6	6.3	1.5
1995	Melbourne	3	20	77	46	233	44	277	109	25	3.9	2.3	11.7	2.2	13.9	5.5	1.3
1996	Melbourne	3	6	15	8	50	11	61	25	5	2.5	1.3	8.3	1.8	10.2	4.2	0.8
1997	Melbourne	3	5	7	8	27	6	33	13	3	1.4	1.6	5.4	1.2	6.6	2.6	0.6
1998	Melbourne	3	21	40	17	154	56	210	71	26	1.9	0.8	7.3	2.7	10.0	3.4	1.2
1999	Melbourne	3	2	3	0	13	6	19	9	1	1.5	0.0	6.5	3.0	9.5	4.5	0.5
Career			226	426	277	2656	898	3554	1103	315	1.9	1.2	11.8	4.0	15.7	4.9	1.5

== In popular culture ==
Australian cricketer Nathan Lyon is nicknamed "Garry", after Garry Lyon.
