= Big Fish (disambiguation) =

Big Fish is a 2003 American film.

Big Fish may also refer to:

- Big Fish: A Novel of Mythic Proportions, the novel by Daniel Wallace on which the film is based
- Big Fish (musical), the Broadway musical based on Wallace's novel and John August's screenplay
- Big Fish (soundtrack), the soundtrack album from the film

== Arts, entertainment, and media ==
=== Music ===
- Big Fish (band), a Swedish rock band
- Big Fish Theory, 2017 album by Vince Staples
  - "Big Fish" (song), a single from the album
- "Big Fish", 1998 song by Far From Home from the album I Want to Be Like You
- "Big Fish", 2020 song by Zhou Shen from his TME Live album Good Night, See You Tomorrow (周深"晚安 明天见"TME live 超现场)

=== Television ===
- Big Fish (TV series), an Australian fishing show
- "Big Fish", an episode of the TV series Joe 90

=== Other arts, entertainment, and media ===
- The Big Fish, a sculpture by John Kindness
- Big Fish Games, an online game portal

== Other uses ==
- Big Fish Golf Club, a golf course in Wisconsin
- BK Big Fish, a Burger King sandwich
- Big Fish (yacht), a luxury yacht launched in 2010
- The Big Fish (roadside attraction), a former drive-in restaurant in Minnesota
- The Big Fish, a term in darts to indicate a 170 checkout finish

== See also ==
- Big-fish–little-pond effect, a theory in psychology
- List of largest fish
