= List of Australian television series premieres in 2012 =

This is a list of Australian television programs which first aired in 2012, arranged chronological order. Where more than one program premiered on the same date, those programs are listed alphabetically.

== Premieres ==
=== Free-to-air television ===
Program	Network	Premiere date	Ref
Big Fish	One	8 January	
The Loop	Eleven	28 January	
Excess Baggage	Nine Network	30 January	
Please Marry My Boy	Seven Network	30 January	
Santo, Sam and Ed's Sports Fever!	Seven Network	30 January	
The Straits	ABC1	2 February	
Weekend Breakfast	ABC News 24	4 February	
Grandstand	ABC News 24	6 February	
Mornings	Nine Network	6 February	
Outland	ABC1	8 February	
Planet America	ABC News 24	17 February	
Kitchen Cabinet	ABC2	22 February	
Woodley	ABC1	22 February	
Breakfast	Network Ten	23 February^{[a]}	
Luke Nguyen's Greater Mekong	SBS One	23 February	
Miss Fisher's Murder Mysteries	ABC1	24 February	
Danger 5	SBS One	27 February	
News Exchange	ABC News 24	February	
Agony Uncles	ABC1	21 March	
Country Town Rescue	ABC1	27 March	
Pictures of You	Seven Network	27 March	
Auction Room	ABC1	15 April	
The Voice	Nine Network	15 April	
ABC Open	ABC News 24	20 April	
Agony Aunts	ABC1	2 May	
Randling	ABC1	2 May	
The Living Room	Network Ten	11 May	
Tricky Business	Nine Network	14 May	
Shaun Micallef's Mad as Hell	ABC1	25 May	
The Politically Incorrect Parenting Show	GEM	31 May	
Being Lara Bingle	Network Ten	12 June	
Myf Warhurst's Nice	ABC1	13 June	
Hamish and Andy's Euro Gap Year	Nine Network	14 June	
Photo Finish	ABC1	14 June	
Dumb, Drunk and Racist	ABC2	20 June	
Lightning Point	Network Ten	22 June	
Bindi's Bootcamp	ABC3	7 July	
The Shire	Network Ten	16 July	
Everybody Dance Now	Network Ten	12 August	
Puberty Blues	Network Ten	15 August	
Class Of...	Network Ten	15 August	
Destination Flavour	SBS One	16 August	
Don't Tell the Bride	Network Ten	21 August	
I Will Survive	Network Ten	22 August	
The Beer Factor	Go!	1 September	
Yes Chef	Network Ten	15 September	
The Unbelievable Truth	Seven Network	4 October	
Bushwhacked!	ABC3	6 October	
The Strange Calls	ABC2	16 October^{[b]}	
A Moody Christmas	ABC1	31 October	
Redfern Now	ABC1	1 November	
Problems	ABC1	1 November	

=== Subscription television ===
Program	Network	Premiere date	Ref
Cricket Superstar	Fox8	4 January	
Wife Swap Australia	LifeStyle You	9 January	
I Survived... Stories of Australia	Bio.	11 January	
Conspiracy 365	FMC	14 January	
The Aussie Way Up	Nat Geo Adventure	15 January	
Kings Cross ER: St Vincent's Hospital	Crime & Investigation Network	2 February	
Australian Business	Sky News Business	10 February	
AFL 360	Fox Footy	20 February	
AFL Insider	Fox Footy	21 February	
Local Produce	MTV Australia	26 February	
NRL Highlights Show	Fox Sports 2	6 March	
Eddie McGuire Tonight	Fox Footy	11 March	
WAG Nation	Arena	18 April	
CBeebies Story Time	CBeebies	23 April	
The SuperCoach Show	Fox Footy	29 April	
Location Location Location Australia	The LifeStyle Channel	11 July	
The Weekend on Club [V]	Channel [V]	24 August	
Tony Robinson's Time Walks	The History Channel	10 September	
Territory Cops	Crime & Investigation Network	11 October	
Foxtel Movie Show	Arena	5 December	
How We Invented the World	Discovery Channel	10 December	

== Notes ==
- ^{a} Breakfast was originally scheduled to premiere on 27 February 2012, but this date was moved forward to 23 February 2012 following former Prime Minister Kevin Rudd's resignation as Minister for Foreign Affairs on 22 February 2012 and the subsequent announcement of an Australian Labor Party leadership spill.
- ^{b} The Strange Calls was available online via ABC iview from 9 October 2012 prior to its television broadcast.
