= Open Mike (TV series) =

- Presented by: Mike Sheahan
- Country of origin: Australia
- Original language: English
- No. of seasons: 10
- No. of episodes: 234

Production
- Running time: 30 minutes

Original release
- Network: Fox Sports (2009-2011); Fox Footy (2012-2020)
- Release: 21 March 2009 – 20 October 2020

Open Mike is an Australian interview-based talk show hosted by sports journalist and writer Mike Sheahan. Each week during the Australian Football League (AFL) season, Sheahan interviewed a figure in the history of Australian football, discussing their involvement in the game, whether on-field or off-field, as well as their lives and contributions away from the game.

== History ==
The series premiered on Fox Sports Australia in 2009, before moving to Fox Sports' dedicated AFL channel Fox Footy in 2012. The show regularly aired on Monday nights at 9.30pm until moving to Tuesday nights at 8.30pm in 2016.

Guests have included former champion players Kevin Bartlett, Leigh Matthews and Bob Skilton; coaching greats Kevin Sheedy, David Parkin and Malcolm Blight, and media personalities Tony Charlton, Eddie McGuire and Sam Newman. Former chief executive officer of the AFL Andrew Demetriou, former Sydney premiership coach Paul Roos, and Kevin Sheedy have also appeared twice in two separate episodes.

In October 2020, it was announced by Fox Footy that Sheahan would be retiring after an 11 year stint at the station, thus concluding Open Mike. In a fitting farewell, the 234th and final episode turned the tables on the long-time presenter, with the longtime presenters of fellow Fox Footy program AFL 360, journalists Gerard Whateley and Mark Robinson taking the hosting role and interviewing Sheahan. The episode aired on 20 October 2020.

== List of episodes ==
=== Season One (2009–11) ===
- Episode 1 - Tom Harley (2009)
- Episode 2 - Chris Judd (2009)
- Episode 3 - Matthew Richardson (2009)
- Episode 4 - Brett Kirk (2009)
- Episode 5 - Jim Stynes (2010)
- Episode 6 - Paul Roos (2010)
- Episode 7 - Robert DiPierdomenico (2010)
- Episode 8 - Craig Kelly (2010)
- Episode 9 - Jason Dunstall (2010)
- Episode 10 - Leigh Matthews (2011)
- Episode 11 - Andrew McLeod (2011)
- Episode 12 - Robert Flower (2011)
- Episode 13 - Greg Williams (2011)
- Episode 14 - Alastair Lynch (2011)
- Episode 15 - Kevin Bartlett (2011)

=== Season Two (2012) ===
- Episode 1 - Jim Stynes Tribute Special
- Episode 2 - Nathan Buckley
- Episode 3 - Dermott Brereton
- Episode 4 - Glenn Archer
- Episode 5 - Andrew Demetriou
- Episode 6 - Sam Newman
- Episode 7 - Stephen Kernahan
- Episode 8 - Mark Ricciuto
- Episode 9 - Neil Balme
- Episode 10 - Jason Akermanis
- Episode 11 - Peter Moore
- Episode 12 - Malcolm Blight
- Episode 13 - Adam Goodes
- Episode 14 - Chris Grant
- Episode 15 - David Parkin
- Episode 16 - Denis Pagan
- Episode 17 - Tony Charlton
- Episode 18 - Stephen Silvagni
- Episode 19 - Kevin Sheedy
- Episode 20 - Warren Tredrea
- Episode 21 - Phil Carman
- Episode 22 - Steven Baker
- Episode 23 - Robert Walls
- Episode 24 - Martin Pike
- Episode 25 - Don Scott
- Episode 26 - Tadhg Kennelly
- Episode 27 - Peter Hudson (Feat. Kevin Neale)

=== Season Three (2013) ===
- Episode 1 - Eddie McGuire
- Episode 2 - Gary Ablett Jnr
- Episode 3 - Doug Hawkins
- Episode 4 - Matthew Scarlett
- Episode 5 - Rex Hunt
- Episode 6 - Barry Hall
- Episode 7 - David Schwarz
- Episode 8 - Royce Hart
- Episode 9 - Peter Schwab
- Episode 10 - Nicky Winmar & Gilbert McAdam
- Episode 11 - Sam Kekovich
- Episode 12 - Warwick Capper
- Episode 13 - John Kennedy Sr.
- Episode 14 - Paul Salmon
- Episode 15 - Wayne Johnston
- Episode 16 - Simon Beasley
- Episode 17 - Corey McKernan
- Episode 18 - Mark Maclure
- Episode 19 - Peter Knights
- Episode 20 - Tony Liberatore
- Episode 21 - Graham Cornes
- Episode 22 - Wayne Schwass
- Episode 23 - David Rhys-Jones
- Episode 24 - Doug Wade
- Episode 25 - Gary Ayres
- Episode 26 - Neil Roberts, Keith Greig & Adam Cooney (Brownlow Night Special)
- Episode 27 - Andrew Demetriou

=== Season Four (2014) ===
- Episode 1 - Bob Skilton
- Episode 2 - Ricky Nixon (Part 1)
- Episode 3 - Ricky Nixon (Part 2)
- Episode 4 - Neil Kerley
- Episode 5 - Michael Voss
- Episode 6 - Brent Guerra
- Episode 7 - Cameron Mooney
- Episode 8 - Des Tuddenham
- Episode 9 - Justin Koschitzke
- Episode 10 - Mal Brown
- Episode 11 - Terry Daniher
- Episode 12 - Alan Stoneham
- Episode 13 - Garry Wilson
- Episode 14 - Jason McCartney
- Episode 15 - John Barnes
- Episode 16 - David Neitz
- Episode 17 - Gary Pert
- Episode 18 - Michael Turner
- Episode 19 - Ricky McLean
- Episode 20 - John Kennedy Jr.
- Episode 21 - Stewart Loewe
- Episode 22 - Alec Epis
- Episode 23 - Damian Monkhorst
- Episode 24 - Mal Michael
- Episode 25 - Gavin Wanganeen
- Episode 26 - Tony Shaw
- Episode 27 - Paul Couch
- Episode 28 - Rene Kink

=== Season Five (2015) ===
- Episode 1 - Jonathan Brown
- Episode 2 - Guy McKenna
- Episode 3 - Graham Arthur
- Episode 4 - Mark Thompson
- Episode 5 - Leon Baker
- Episode 6 - Todd Viney
- Episode 7 - Gavin Brown
- Episode 8 - John Elliott
- Episode 9 - Simon Madden
- Episode 10 - Mark Eustice
- Episode 11 - Chris Mew
- Episode 12 - Ted Whitten Special: "Mr. Football 20 Years On"
- Episode 13 - Jordan Bannister
- Episode 14 - Tony Modra
- Episode 15 - Billy Brownless
- Episode 16 - Dale Lewis
- Episode 17 - Gerard Neesham
- Episode 18 - Tim McGrath
- Episode 19 - Alex Johnson
- Episode 20 - Barry Breen
- Episode 21 - Beau Vernon
- Episode 22 - Brian Cook
- Episode 23 - The Cornes Family: Graham, Chad and Kane Cornes
- Episode 24 - Tony Jewell
- Episode 25 - Anthony Stevens
- Episode 26 - Chris Lewis
- Episode 27 - Grand Final Special: Agony & Ecstasy (Featuring Ron McKeown, Matthew Primus, Leo Barry and Shane Ellen)

=== Season Six (2016) ===
- Episode 1 - Matinee Idols Special (Featuring Barry Richardson, Peter Hudson and Sam Newman)
- Episode 2 - Caroline Wilson
- Episode 3 - St Kilda Special: '50 Years On' (Commemorating the 50th anniversary of St. Kilda's only premiership in 1966)
- Episode 4 - Richie Vandenberg
- Episode 5 - Simon Black
- Episode 6 - Paul Vander Haar
- Episode 7 - Denis Banks
- Episode 8 - Russell Greene
- Episode 9 - Michael Conlan
- Episode 10 - Ken Sheldon
- Episode 11 - Rod Grinter
- Episode 12 - Aaron Hamill
- Episode 13 - Glen Jakovich
- Episode 14 - Jake King
- Episode 15 - Terry Wallace
- Episode 16 - Anthony and Saverio Rocca
- Episode 17 - Barry Cable
- Episode 18 - Mark "Jacko" Jackson
- Episode 19 - Steven Febey
- Episode 20 - John and Marc Murphy
- Episode 21 - Liam Pickering
- Episode 22 - Andrew Ireland
- Episode 23 - Paul Roos
- Episode 24 - Mike Pyke
- Episode 25 - Matthew Lloyd
- Episode 26 - Brownlow Medal Special - John Schultz and Kevin Murray
- Episode 27 - Brian Lake
- Episode 28 - Peter Gordon (Western Bulldogs President) - Grand Final Week Special

=== Season Seven (2017) ===
- Episode 1 - Western Bulldogs 2016 Premiership - 'Against All Odds'
- Episode 2 - Matthew Pavlich
- Episode 3 - Greg and Erin Phillips
- Episode 4 - Anthony Koutoufides
- Episode 5 - Geoff Raines
- Episode 6 - Peter Bedford
- Episode 7 - Gary Buckenara
- Episode 8 - Daniel Ward
- Episode 9 - Peter Sumich
- Episode 10 - John Rantall
- Episode 11 - Nick Dal Santo
- Episode 12 - Peter Bosustow
- Episode 13 - Oliver and Rachael Florent (featuring Ryan O’Connor)
- Episode 14 - Jeff Kennett
- Episode 15 - Jim Jess
- Episode 16 - Ross Glendinning
- Episode 17 - Geoff Southby
- Episode 18 - Corey Enright
- Episode 19 - Ron Joseph
- Episode 20 - John Platten
- Episode 21 - Paul Connors
- Episode 22 - Brendon Gale
- Episode 23 - Dustin Fletcher
- Episode 24 - Brian Taylor
- Episode 25 - Kevin Sheedy Special: 'Sheeds: 50 Years in Footy'

=== Season Eight (2018) ===
- Episode 1 - Tom Lonergan and Andrew Mackie
- Episode 2 - Justin Leppitsch
- Episode 3 - Bob Murphy
- Episode 4 - Dale Weightman
- Episode 5 - Mervyn Keane
- Episode 6 - Justin Madden
- Episode 7 - Nathan Brown
- Episode 8 - Mike Fitzpatrick
- Episode 9 - Shaun Smith
- Episode 10 - Hannah Mouncey
- Episode 11 - Craig Hutchison
- Episode 12 - Mike Sheahan & Ben Brown
- Episode 13 - Daniel Southern
- Episode 14 - Nick Maxwell
- Episode 15 - Barry Stoneham
- Episode 16 - Mark Neeld
- Episode 17 - Mark Brayshaw
- Episode 18 - Ken Hunter
- Episode 19 - Shaun Rehn
- Episode 20 - Jeff “Joffa” Corfe - Grand Final Week Special

Notes

- — As part of Player Takeover week on Fox Footy, the episode was split into two parts consisting of Brown interviewing Sheahan in the first half of the episode and Sheahan interviewing Brown in the second half of the episode.

=== Season Nine (2019) ===
- Episode 1 - Sandy Roberts
- Episode 2 - Ray Chamberlain
- Episode 3 - The Hayes Family: Will, Prue & David Hayes
- Episode 4 - Brendon Goddard
- Episode 5 - Steven Smith
- Episode 6 - Rodney Eade
- Episode 7 - Brad Ottens
- Episode 8 - David Dench & Kelvin Moore
- Episode 9 - David McKay
- Episode 10 - Clay Smith
- Episode 11 - Mark Allen
- Episode 12 - Andrew Dunkley
- Episode 13 - Ray Shaw
- Episode 14 - Scott Cummings
- Episode 15 - The John Coleman Story
- Episode 16 - Ray McLean
- Episode 17 - Steve Johnson
- Episode 18 - Tom Boyd
- Episode 19 - Dane Swan
- Episode 20 - Brian Lake & Marty Pask - Grand Final Week Special

=== Season Ten (2020) ===
- Episode 1 - Callan Ward
- Episode 2 - Michael Green
- Episode 3 - Dale Morris
- Episode 4 - Jason Johnson
- Episode 5 - Geoff Blethyn
- Episode 6 - Michael Gayfer
- Episode 7 - Ian Stewart
- Episode 8 - Alex Woodward
- Episode 9 - Luke Ball
- Episode 10 - Jack Trengove
- Episode 11 - Matt Rendell
- Episode 12 - Trent Croad
- Episode 13 - Michael Roach
- Episode 14 - Port Adelaide Special: (Featuring Russell Ebert and Darren Cahill) (Commemorating the 150th anniversary of the Port Adelaide Football Club.)
- Episode 15 - Mike Sheahan Farewell Special: (featuring Mark Robinson and Gerard Whateley as interviewers)

== Awards and nominations ==
Year	Award	Category	Result
2014	ASTRA Awards	Most Outstanding Sports Entertainment Program	Won
2014	Australian Football Media Awards	Most Outstanding Television Program	Won

== Book ==
Published by The Slattery Media Group in 2013, Open Mike: Conversations with Greats of the AFL Game is a selection of transcripts of Open Mike interviews from the first two seasons.

== See also ==
- List of Australian television series
- List of longest-running Australian television series
