= Bounce (Australian TV series) =

Television series

- Presented by: Jason Dunstall (2007–present); Cameron Mooney (2016–present); Danny Frawley (2007–2019); Bernie Vince (2019–present); Andrew Gaze (2011–present); Ben Dixon (2021–present)
- Country of origin: Australia
- Original language: English
- No. of seasons: 11
- No. of episodes: 350

Production
- Executive producer: Bill Cannon
- Running time: 60 minutes

Original release
- Network: Fox Sports (2007–2011); Fox Footy (2012–present)
- Release: 2007 – present

Bounce, formerly known as Before the Bounce and After the Bounce, is an Australian family-friendly, light entertainment television series focusing on Australian Rules football. The show, currently airing on Fox Footy, takes a comedic look back at the previous week in the Australian Football League. First aired in 2007, the show is currently hosted by former footballers Jason Dunstall and Cameron Mooney and former basketballer Andrew Gaze.

== History ==
Originally called Before the Bounce, the show was broadcast on Friday nights before the opening game of the round. The original hosts were Dunstall, Frawley, journalists Gerard Whateley and Damian Barrett, and former footballer Billy Brownless. In 2011, the show's name changed to After the Bounce and it moved to Sunday nights, normally immediately after the final game of the round. Whateley hosted the show for the final time in 2011, before his other show, AFL 360, was extended to be broadcast four nights per week in 2012 with the launch of the new 24/7 AFL channel Fox Footy. When co-host Damien Fleming left Australia to cover the Australian cricket team's tour of the West Indies in March 2012, he was replaced by Andrew Gaze. For 2014, the show's name was changed again, this time to simply Bounce, and it moved to Wednesday nights at 8.30pm following AFL 360. In 2015, it returned to the Sunday night timeslot following the final game of the round, but retained its title of Bounce. The show also became sponsored by Holden.

Following the 2015 season, Alastair Lynch left the show in order to spend more time with his family. He was due to be replaced by former stand-in presenter Nathan Grima, who had recently announced his retirement from the AFL. However, in February 2016, Grima announced a comeback to football, signing with the Essendon Football Club as a top-up player due to the club's supplements controversy. As such, it was later announced that former footballer Cameron Mooney would join the series, with Barry Hall to also join the series for the 'Yesterday's Heroes' segment. In April 2016, Gaze announced that he would be leaving the show after the show on 24 April 2016 to take up a role as head coach of the Sydney Kings in the National Basketball League. Gaze would remain on the show on a part-time basis, in rotation with other guest panellists including the return of Fleming, former footballers Brian Lake and Robert DiPierdomenico and comedians Julian Schiller and Tegan Higginbotham amongst others. This format would continue in future seasons.

The 350th episode of Bounce aired on 23 June 2019.

On 9 September 2019, Danny Frawley died in a single-car crash. Bounce did not air for the rest of the 2019 season, however a special episode appeared a week later in his memory.

Approaching the 2020 season, it was announced Bounce will return with Dunstall remaining as host, Gaze increasing his presence in the show, with Mooney, Sharni Layton and Bernie Vince resuming their roles as other members on the panel. The Golden Fist Award was renamed "Spud's Golden Fist" as a continuation of Frawley's legacy.

== Hosts ==
=== Regular Presenters ===
- Jason Dunstall (2007–present)
- Cameron Mooney (2016–present)
- Bernie Vince (2019–present)
- Andrew Gaze (2011–2016, 2019–present)
- Ben Dixon (2021–present)

=== Former presenters ===
- Danny Frawley (2007–2019)
- Billy Brownless (2007–2008)
- Gerard Whateley (2007–2011)
- Damian Barrett (2007–2009)
- Damien Fleming (2011–2012)
- Alastair Lynch (2012–2015)
- Sharni Layton (2018–2020)
- Ruby Schleicher (2024–2025)

=== Temporary presenters ===
- Mark Bosnich (2012, 2015, 2016)
- Sam Pang (2014)
- Nathan Grima (2014)
- Julian Schiller (2016–17)
- Brian Lake (2016–2018)
- Robert DiPierdomenico (2016)
- Tegan Higginbotham (2016–2017)
- Merv Hughes (2016)
- Rodney Hogg (2016)
- Simon O'Donnell (2016–2018)
- Brad Johnson (2024–present)

== Segments ==
=== Current ===
- The Grit Shift - At the beginning of each episode, the panellists each talk through the AFL action from the day, which includes highlights from all of the day’s games. Then, Andrew Gaze does a thorough run-through of the AFL ladder, from the top-placed team to the bottom-placed team, in which he briefly sums up how each team is performing in his own words.
- Mildly Amusing Moments - Jason Dunstall shows amusing footage recorded by AFL clubs over the week (including training videos and grabs from coaches’ press conferences), and this footage is interspersed with humorous commentary from the panel.
- Golden Fist Award - As a protest against most awards being won by midfielders and forwards, Bernie Vince or Ben Dixon (previously Danny Frawley) show clips of the week's best defensive acts (such as tackles and one-percenters) followed by the round's best spoils, and then give votes for the best defenders of the week. After Frawley died in a single-car accident on 9 September 2019, a Change.org petition was started to make it an official AFL award; it has, as of 12 September 2019, garnered over 62,000 signatures.
- Clangers - Sponsored by AAMI, Cameron Mooney selects and discusses ruinous actions committed by players during the games of the latest round. The segment was previously presented by Danny Frawley until his death in 2019 and was previously known as Coach Killers until mid-2015 and Don't Come Monday until 2020.
- Turn It Up! - A soapbox-like segment in which Andrew Gaze admonishes the words/actions of people from the past week.
- Social Life - Bernie Vince or Ben Dixon show social media-based football and non-football clips from the previous week.
- Yesterday's Heroes - Andrew Gaze and Ben Dixon compete against Cameron Mooney and Brad Johnson in non-football sports and activities organised by Jason Dunstall. The segment originally featured Dunstall and Danny Frawley competing against each other until Frawley's death in 2019. Damien Fleming originally served as host. Following his departure, Gaze took over as host of the segment. Teammates were introduced for Dunstall and Frawley in 2016, with Mooney partnering with Dunstall, while Frawley partnered with Barry Hall and Brian Lake at various times. This segment was not used in 2020 due to COVID-19 restrictions.
- Big Roost - Jason Dunstall shows the three panellists a random kick or passage of play from the round's action, and then they are tasked with guessing the distance of the kick or passage of play. Each panellist also plays on behalf of an audience member. The panellist with the closest guess wins their audience member a Bounce prize pack. Points are accrued every week, with the closest guesser each week receiving three points, second place scoring two points and last place scoring just one point. Every few weeks, the panellist with the lowest collective score has to perform a penalty act as punishment, though on most occasions, two panellists (the two lowest scorers) are forced to undertake the penalties. If the three panellists are tied for points when the punishment is implemented, all three panellists are usually forced to do the penalty act.
- Steel Blue Mark of the Week - The panellists each nominate an impressive mark that was taken during the round, and the player who took the best mark (as judged by Jason Dunstall) earns a pair of Steel Blue boots.
- Numerology - Cameron Mooney presents numerical or statistical quirks from the previous weekend. This segment was previously featured on the show every week but has only been featured sporadically since 2022, mainly due to Jason Dunstall’s dislike of the segment.

==== Golden Fist Award ====
The winners of the Golden Fist Award are listed below. The annual award is given to the defender that accumulates the most votes from Bernie Vince and Ben Dixon (previously Danny Frawley) across the season. The award was sponsored by Cbus from 2013 to 2015 and Mrs Mac's Pies in 2018.

Year	Winner/s	Club
2012	Ted Richards	Sydney Swans
2013	Josh Gibson and Brian Lake	Hawthorn FC
2014	Scott Thompson	North Melbourne FC
2015	Alex Rance	Richmond FC
2016	Alex Rance (2)	Richmond FC
2017	Alex Rance (3)	Richmond FC
2018	Jeremy McGovern *	West Coast Eagles
2019	James Sicily **	Hawthorn FC
2020	Harris Andrews	Brisbane Lions
2021	Jake Lever	Melbourne FC
2022	Tom Stewart	Geelong FC
2023	Dan Houston	Port Adelaide FC
2024	Nick Blakey and James Sicily (2)	Sydney Swans and Hawthorn FC
2025	Harris Andrews (2)	Brisbane Lions
2026	Tom Stewart (2)	Geelong FC

* McGovern was in 2019 declared the winner, despite Harris Andrews being declared the winner on the final show in 2018.

** Sicily was in front when voting ended after Frawley's death.

=== Previous ===
- Cut The Crap - Andrew Gaze calls out clichéd press conferences from players or coaches and re-dubs the audio to what he thinks they really should have said.
- Chief's Instagram - The crew berates Jason with supposed pictures and videos from his Instagram: @chief_dunstall
- Top 5 - Jason Dunstall delivers a top 5 relating to one topic.
- Dribble File - Jason Dunstall looks at failed dribble kicks from the latest round.
- Please Explain - Jason Dunstall is left baffled by off-field events of the week.
- What Happens Next? - Alastair Lynch plays an excerpt of archival football game footage, and the other three co-hosts have to guess what will happen in it.
- Lynchy's Time Warp - Alastair Lynch plays tapes from past and present games relating to a single topic.
- Real Bounce Australia - Danny Frawley, Andrew Gaze, Alastair Lynch and Jason Dunstall take you behind the scenes of the program, in a parody of The Real Housewives franchise.
- The Flog Files - Jason Dunstall presents events of the week that demonstrate an admirable commitment to general floggery.
- In This Round - Jason Dunstall looks back at some of the highlights of the round that just ended in past seasons.
- Bring Your Boots - Cameron Mooney spotlights a player's superior effort and commitment from one of the weekend's games. In later seasons, this has been adapted to feature the best dribble kick of the week, in response to Dunstall's Dribble File.
- Moon's Beef of the Week - Cameron Mooney discusses things that have irritated him throughout the week. This segment was previously presented by Jason Dunstall.
- Take it to the Bank - Cameron Mooney makes a prediction about the AFL season that he is highly confident will occur.

== See also ==
- List of Australian television series
- List of longest-running Australian television series
