= The Winners (Australian TV series) =

- Also known as: The Winners Rebooted
- Country of origin: Australia
- Original language: English

Original release
- Network: ABC (1970s – 1980s); Fox Footy Channel (2000 – 2006); Fox Sports (2007 – 2011); Fox Footy (2015 – 2016)
- Release: 1977 – 1986; 2000 – 2012; 2015 – 2016

The Winners was a long running Australian television series that shows highlights of Australian rules football matches.

== Original show (1970s and 1980s) ==
The original version was broadcast from 1977 until 1986 on the ABC on Sunday mornings. It was normally hosted by Drew Morphett with a panel consisting of former players and pundits. Two matches from the previous day's Victorian Football League (VFL) fixtures would be screened and the panel would speculate about the games along with the league ladder and the goal, mark and play of the day. The format of the show was comprehensive, yet devoted mainly to matters on the field. Today it appears simplistic when compared with modern football's more saturated and market driven media coverage.

== Newer show (2000-2011) ==
A new version of The Winners returned on the Fox Footy Channel in 2002, hosted by Clinton Grybas, showing highlights of all eight AFL games from the weekend in a one-hour show. From 2007 to 2011, it was shown on Fox Sports on the Monday night following the round. Following Grybas' death in 2008, Dwayne Russell became host of the program until the end of 2011. In 2012, the show was originally meant to be part of the new Fox Footy but was subsequently removed as AFL 360 expanded from one night to four nights a week.

== Rebooted (2015) ==
A new iteration of the show was launched in 2015, known as The Winners Rebooted. Hosted once again by Drew Morphett, the show once again aired on Fox Footy. This version of the show focused on archival footage and extended highlights of historical games rather than as a recap of contemporary football. The show ended at the end of 2016.
