= On the Couch (Australian TV series) =

Australian sports TV series

- Created by: Fox Sports
- Presented by: Jack Riewoldt (2025–); Jonathan Brown (2015–); Nathan Buckley (2023–); Leigh Matthews (2025–); Jordan Lewis (2025–); Jon Ralph (2022–)
- Country of origin: Australia
- Original language: English
- No. of seasons: 21
- No. of episodes: 500+

Production
- Running time: 60 minutes

Original release
- Network: Fox Footy Channel (2002-2006); Fox Sports (2007-2011); Fox Footy (2012-present)
- Release: 2002 – present

Related
- Talking Footy

On the Couch is an Australian television program focusing on current issues in the Australian Football League. From its debut in 2002 until 2006, it was shown on the Fox Footy Channel, until the channel's demise. From 2007 to 2011 it was broadcast on Fox Sports, before moving to the relaunched Fox Footy from 2012 onwards. The show airs on Monday nights at 7:30pm, immediately following AFL 360.

== Format ==
The shows format follows an "informal chat" style in a set that resembles a lounge room. It focuses more on in-depth coverage, analysis and discussions of topics from the weekend as well as occasionally holding an interview with a player or coach during the 2nd half of the episode.

The concept and style is similar to the Seven Network program Talking Footy, which also featured Mike Sheahan as chief journalist during its original run from 1994 to 2004.

== History ==
Former players Gerard Healy and Robert Walls and journalist Mike Sheahan were the original presenters of the show. In 2009, James Hird replaced Walls on the couch. When Hird left to pursue a coaching career with Essendon, Paul Roos replaced him. In 2014, Roos left to coach the Melbourne Football Club and was replaced by long-time Fox Footy broadcaster and former player Jason Dunstall.

In 2015, Mike Sheahan announced that he was retiring from the show after 13 years. His replacement was recently retired Brisbane Lions triple-premiership player Jonathan Brown. David King, who appeared occasionally in 2015, joined the series full-time in 2016. In July 2016, the original line-up of Healy, Sheahan and Walls returned for a special one-off episode before Fox Footy's 'Retro Round'.

In late 2021, Healy stepped down as host with Garry Lyon replacing him, the show also commenced airing before AFL 360.

In November 2024, it was announced that Jack Riewoldt would be replacing Lyon as host of the program, after the latter was announced as a new co-host on AFL 360.

In February 2025, Fox announced Leigh Matthews and Jordan Lewis would join the series. Lewis appears weekly alongside Riewoldt, Brown and Buckley, while Matthews appears on the program once every month.

== Previous Hosts and Panellists ==
- Garry Lyon (host, 2022–2024, panellist, 2018–2021)
- Gerard Healy (Host, 2002–2021)
- Mike Sheahan (2002–2014)
- Robert Walls (2002–2008)
- James Hird (2009–2010)
- Paul Roos (2011–2013, 2018–2019)
- David King (2015–2017)
- Jason Dunstall (2014–2017)
- Nick Riewoldt (2020–2022)
- Tom Morris (reporter, 2015–2021)

Various Fox Sports commentators have filled in along the way including Jason Dunstall, Brian Taylor and Alastair Lynch.

== See also ==
- List of Australian television series
- List of longest-running Australian television series
