= League Teams =

- Genre: AFL program
- Presented by: Dermott Brereton
- Country of origin: Australia
- Original language: English
- No. of seasons: 14

Production
- Running time: 30 minutes

Original release
- Network: Fox Footy Channel (2002–2006); Fox Sports (2007–2011); Fox Footy (2012–2018)
- Release: 2002 – present

League Teams (formerly known as AFL Teams) was a weekly Australian sports television series based on the Australian Football League (AFL) that airs on Fox Footy. It was shown on Thursdays at 6:30pm, to coincide with that round's team announcements. Hosted by Dermott Brereton, it also featured members of the Fox Footy's commentary team every week during the AFL season.

A predecessor show with the same name and same general format was screened by HSV-7 in Melbourne in the 1960s and 1970s. It featured a panel of three well known former players, Lou Richards, Jack Dyer and Bob Davis. It was shown late on Thursday nights during the football season.

== History ==
The show was launched on the original iteration of Fox Footy Channel in 2002, and was hosted by Jason Dunstall. The show's panellists were Luke Darcy, former Geelong and Essendon player John Barnes, and former Sydney player Wayne Schwass. The show finished at the end of the 2006 season when Fox Footy Channel ceased operations, and it moved to parent channel Fox Sports. It continued there until 2012, when Fox Footy was launched and the show returned to an AFL-dedicated channel.

From 2007 to 2010, it was hosted by former footballer Brian Taylor. He was replaced by Dermott Brereton following the 2011 season, after Taylor's departure to the Seven Network.

The show had changed format 2017 when Paul Roos joined Brereton on the show with the format changed to a “match committee” style.

The show was axed in 2018 and was replaced by The Weekend Lowdown, which was hosted by Sarah Olle, with most of those who appeared on League Teams except Brereton and Roos appearing on the show.

== Host ==
- Jason Dunstall (2002–2006)
- Brian Taylor (2007–2011)
- Dermott Brereton (2012–2017)
- Paul Roos (2017)

== Panellists ==
- Brad Johnson
- Alastair Lynch
- Ben Dixon
- Luke Darcy
- John Barnes
- Wayne Schwass
- Tony Shaw
- Barry Hall
- David Parkin
- Cameron Mooney
- Liam Pickering
- Paul Roos

== See also ==
- List of Australian television series
- List of longest-running Australian television series
