= The Back Page (TV program) =

- Also known as: Back Page Live
- Genre: Sport
- Presented by: Tony Squires
- Starring: Candice Warner; Robert Craddock
- Country of origin: Australia
- Original language: English
- No. of seasons: 29

Production
- Producer: Matthew Parslow
- Camera setup: Multiple-camera setup
- Running time: 60 minutes (including commercials)

Original release
- Network: Fox Sports (1997–2025); Network Ten (2017)
- Release: 1997 – 24 June 2025

The Back Page, also known as Back Page Live, was an Australian sports television show broadcast on Fox Sports on Tuesday nights between 1997 and June 2025. The show was hosted by Tony Squires, with a roster of panelists including retired Australian professional ironwoman Candice Warner, cricket writer Robert 'Crash' Craddock, broadcaster Ryan Fitzgerald and former Australian cricketer Kerry O'Keeffe.

The main content of the weekly show featured a round-up of the previous week's sporting news, and featured interviews with sporting personalities. It also covered all major Australian sports as well as international sports.

== Current panelists ==
- Tony Squires (host, 2013–present)
- Candice Warner (regular panelist, 2022–present)
- Greg Alexander
- Caitlin Bassett
- Robert 'Crash' Craddock
- Ben Dixon
- Ryan 'Fitzy' Fitzgerald
- Bryan Fletcher
- Dan Ginnane
- James Hooper
- Brad Johnson
- Kerry O'Keeffe
- Robbie Slater
- Adam Spencer
- Dave Thornton
- Lauren Wood
- Lawrence Mooney

== Former panelists ==
- Mike Gibson (host, 1997–2012)
- Billy Birmingham (regular panelist, 1997–2012)
- Peter FitzSimons (regular panelist)
- Tracey Holmes (regular panelist)
- Peter Frilingos (regular panelist)
- David Hookes (regular panelist)
- Matt Shirvington (co-host, 2013)
- Kelli Underwood (co-host, 2013–2021)
- Mark Bosnich (regular panelist, 2013–2021)
- Julian Schiller (regular panelist, 2013–2017)

== History ==
Launched in 1997 as The Back Page, the show was originally hosted by journalist Mike Gibson and comedian Billy Birmingham. In 2012, Gibson announced that he was leaving the show after 16 years and 720 episodes. Soon after, Birmingham announced he would not be returning to the show the following year after being informed he'd been demoted to a part-time panelist. In 2013, presenter Tony Squires and athlete Matt Shirvington took up the role of hosting the show. Shirvington left the show the same year, and was replaced by journalist Kelli Underwood.

From 7 October 2017, the show moved from its traditional Tuesday night time slot to air live at 7.00pm Saturday nights on the free-to-air channel One, classified as the shows "Summer Series". Subsequent repeats are shown on Fox Sports throughout the week following. The episodes were shortened from a 1-hour to 45 minutes run time, and the title was changed to The Back Page as it was previously called when it originally launched. This run was short-lived however, ending on 25 November 2017 after just eight episodes. The show returned to its traditional Tuesday night slot on Fox Sports on 27 February 2018.

The Back Page celebrated its 25th year on air in 2021. In June 2025, the show was cancelled and the final episode aired on 24 June 2025, with Underwood returning.

== See also ==
- List of longest-running Australian television series
