= Offsider =

- Offsider, album by Shayne Carter 2016
- Offsiders, Australian TV show
- Offsider, a term originally referring to a bullochy's assistant, who walked on the right or 'off side' of the team; more broadly, any assistant or deputy, in Australian and New Zealand English
