= White Line Fever (TV series) =

- Starring: Clinton Grybas
- Country of origin: Australia
- Original language: English
- No. of seasons: 7
- No. of episodes: 2150

Production
- Camera setup: Multi-camera
- Running time: 1 hour including ad breaks

Original release
- Network: Fox Footy Channel (2002–2006)
- Release: 6 March 2002 – 29 September 2006

White Line Fever was an Australian Football League-related television show, airing from 2000 to 2006 during the regular football season. It was based on a talkback radio format, airing live weeknightly at 7.30 pm AEST on the Fox Footy Channel on the Foxtel, Austar and (since 2003) Optus pay television networks.

Hosted by Clinton Grybas, it allowed fans and viewers to call into the live shows and share their thoughts with regular guest panelists including Tony Shaw, Terry Wallace, Rodney Eade, Derek Humphrey-Smith and Mike Sheahan, along with guest players from AFL teams. The show was unique for its viewer interaction and comprehensive analysis of Australian rules football.

The show made frequent use of live crosses to notable events such as press conferences and AFL Tribunal hearings.

The show commenced in 2002 in a half-hour format from 8pm AEST following the half-hour Fox Footy News, but was expanded to a full hour from 7.30pm AEST in 2003, subsuming the news program as a ten-minute introductory segment presented by Tiffany Cherry. In 2005 the Friday night edition moved to a non-live format, allowing Grybas to front the show without intruding on his football calling duties with radio station 3AW. This edition of the show was rebadged as Friday Night Fever, although still appears as White Line Fever in listings.

The show ceased broadcasting following the closure of Fox Footy Channel after the 2006 season.
