= Nathan Grima =

Australian rules footballer

Personal information
- Full name: Nathan Grima
- Born: 5 August 1985 (age 41)
- Original team: Central District (SANFL)
- Draft: No. 14, 2008 Rookie Draft, North Melbourne
- Height: 192 cm (6 ft 4 in)
- Weight: 96 kg (212 lb)
- Position: Defender

Playing career^{1}
| Years | Club | Games (Goals) |
| 2009–2015 | North Melbourne | 86 (1) |
| 2016 | Essendon | 2 (0) |
| Total | | 88 (1) |
- ^{1} Playing statistics correct to the end of 2016.

Career highlights
- SANFL premiership player: 2007

Nathan Grima (born 5 August 1985) is a former professional Australian rules footballer who played for the North Melbourne Football Club and Essendon Football Club in the Australian Football League (AFL).

== Early career ==
Originally from Tasmania, Grima played for the Tassie Mariners, South Launceston, the Tasmanian Devils and Central District, including in their 2007 SANFL premiership team. Grima was then rookie-listed by North Melbourne in the 2008 AFL Rookie Draft.

== AFL career ==
Grima impressed in early training sessions and looked in line for a promotion before hyper-extending his knee in a marking exercise. The injury prematurely ended his season and raised doubts about his ability to retain a spot on the list.

Despite this injury setback, North Melbourne promoted Grima to the senior list before the start of the 2009 season and the versatile defender was quick to show his potential, holding down a spot at full-back for North's reserves team, Werribee in the VFL in the early part of the season. His strong form led to Grima making his debut in round eight against Geelong. He only missed two games for the rest of the season and combined well in defence with Scott Thompson and Scott McMahon.

Grima scored his first goal in AFL football on Saturday, 17 August 2013 against Essendon at Etihad Stadium. An injury to Leigh Adams resulted in Grima being moved forward for the final quarter of the match. Having not scored a goal after 71 AFL games, he crumbed the ball from a marking contest involving Robbie Tarrant, and snapped a left-foot goal midway through the last quarter. The defender embarked on a wild celebration, being mobbed by teammates who came from all areas of the ground to congratulate him. Had he failed to score, he would have equalled a club record, with former player Ted Larsen having a 72-game drought before scoring a goal.

In July 2015, Grima had announced his retirement, effective immediately, due to a back injury. Grima had been unable to fully recover from the injury that had seen him undergo surgery on his back on two previous occasions. Specialists had advised him that he would need a third operation, this time to fuse a disc in his spine.

In February 2016, Grima returned to the AFL after signing with the Essendon Football Club as a top-up player due to the club's supplements controversy.

== Coaching career ==
In October 2018, Sturt Football Club announced its appointment of Grima as senior coach for 2019. He was previously the coach of Strathmore in the Premier Division of the Essendon District Football League. He now coaches Glenunga Football Club in the Adelaide Amateur Footy League.

== Statistics ==
Legend
| G | Goals | K | Kicks | D | Disposals | T | Tackles |
| B | Behinds | H | Handballs | M | Marks |

| Season | Team | No. | Games | Totals | | | | | | | Averages (per game) | | | | | | |
| Season | Team | No. | Games | G | B | K | H | D | M | T | G | B | K | H | D | M | T |
|---|---|---|---|---|---|---|---|---|---|---|---|---|---|---|---|---|---|
| 2009 | North Melbourne | 17 | 13 | 0 | 0 | 124 | 85 | 209 | 65 | 37 | 0.0 | 0.0 | 9.5 | 6.5 | 16.1 | 5.0 | 2.8 |
| 2010 | North Melbourne | 17 | 17 | 0 | 1 | 181 | 137 | 318 | 99 | 24 | 0.0 | 0.1 | 10.6 | 8.1 | 18.7 | 5.8 | 1.4 |
| 2011 | North Melbourne | 17 | 12 | 0 | 0 | 111 | 77 | 188 | 50 | 17 | 0.0 | 0.0 | 9.3 | 6.4 | 15.7 | 4.2 | 1.4 |
| 2012 | North Melbourne | 17 | 13 | 0 | 0 | 132 | 88 | 220 | 88 | 31 | 0.0 | 0.0 | 10.2 | 6.8 | 16.9 | 6.8 | 2.4 |
| 2013 | North Melbourne | 17 | 17 | 1 | 0 | 186 | 84 | 270 | 91 | 35 | 0.1 | 0.0 | 10.9 | 4.9 | 15.9 | 5.4 | 2.1 |
| 2014 | North Melbourne | 17 | 14 | 0 | 0 | 159 | 71 | 230 | 69 | 23 | 0.0 | 0.0 | 11.4 | 5.1 | 16.4 | 4.9 | 1.6 |
| 2015 | North Melbourne | 17 | 0 | — | — | — | — | — | — | — | — | — | — | — | — | — | — |
| 2016 | Essendon | 55 | 2 | 0 | 0 | 16 | 11 | 27 | 10 | 2 | 0.0 | 0.0 | 8.0 | 5.5 | 13.5 | 5.0 | 1.0 |
| Career | | | 88 | 1 | 1 | 909 | 553 | 1462 | 472 | 169 | 0.0 | 0.0 | 10.3 | 6.3 | 16.6 | 5.4 | 1.9 |

== Media ==
Grima has appeared as a guest presenter on Fox Footy's light entertainment television series Bounce.
