= VvS1 (yacht) =

History

New Zealand
- Name: VvS1
- Owner: Michael Hill
- Builder: Alloy Yachts
- Launched: 2007
- Identification: IMO number: 1009211; MMSI number: 518100358; Callsign: E5U3274

General characteristics
- Class & type: Yacht Charter
- Displacement: 190
- Length: 34.18 m (112.1 ft)
- Beam: 7.78 m (25.5 ft)
- Draught: 2.23 m (7.3 ft)
- Propulsion: 2 x Caterpillar 3406E B-rated engines, twin screw, 475hp each
- Speed: 13 knots (24 km/h) (max); 11.7 knots (22 km/h) (cruising)
- Range: 4,300 nautical miles (7,964 km)
- Capacity: 8 guests
- Crew: 7 crew members

VvS1 is an expedition-style luxury motor yacht, commissioned by New Zealand entrepreneur Michael Hill.

The name refers to a near-flawless grade of diamonds.

Designed by Gregory C. Marshall Naval Architect Ltd and constructed by Alloy Yachts, the yacht was launched in 2007. Equipped with two Caterpillar 3406E diesel engines, each generating 475 hp (354 kW), the ship has a range of 4,300 nautical miles (8,000 km).

The VvS1 has won several awards, including Best Motoryacht Under 40 Metres at the World Superyacht Awards in Venice, Italy in April 2008. In September 2008, the yacht won three awards at the World Yacht Awards in Cannes, France for Best Design Under 40 Metres, Best Interior Under 40 Metres and Best Functionality Under 40 Metres.
