= Kelli Underwood =

Australian sports journalist and sportscaster

Kelli Underwood OAM
- Born: 1977 (age 48–49)
- Education: University of South Australia
- Occupation: sports commentator
- Years active: 2001–present
- Employer(s): Foxtel and Australian Broadcasting Corporation
- Known for: being the first woman to commentate an AFL match on television and radio
- Television: Offsiders, The Back Page

Kelli Louise Underwood (born 1977) is an Australian radio and television sports journalist and sportscaster specialising in Australian rules football, netball and tennis. She was the first woman to call an Australian Football League match on television and radio.

Underwood was a host of ABC's Offsiders and a regular panellist on the Fox Sports program The Back Page. She also calls AFL and AFLW football on Fox Footy and ABC Grandstand.

== Radio career ==
After studying journalism at the University of South Australia, Underwood's work began with an internship at Adelaide radio station FIVEaa before a two-year period working at 5MU in Murray Bridge, South Australia. She then worked at Geelong station K-Rock before moving to 3AW in Melbourne as a sports reporter and AFL match-day reporter.

Underwood is part of the ABC Radio Grandstand team, calling AFL games mainly on Friday nights.

== Television career ==
Underwood's move into television began in 2006 when she joined Network 10 as a sports reporter for Ten News and Sports Tonight. She joined Network Ten's AFL coverage in 2009, replacing Christi Malthouse as a boundary rider.

Underwood made history by becoming the first woman to call an AFL match on television, joining Tim Lane in commentary of the 2009 NAB Cup game between Geelong and the Adelaide Crows. She called her first AFL premiership season match on 18 July 2009—the Round 16 match between Geelong and Melbourne at Kardinia Park with Anthony Hudson. Underwood commentated for matches for Network Ten throughout 2009–10, both in the commentary box and at ground level through until the end of 2011.

Underwood was a host and commentator of ANZ Championship Netball from 2008 until 2016, calling for Network Ten and later Fox Sports.

In 2013, Underwood joined the revamped Fox Sports panel show The Back Page, which she continues to appear alongside host Tony Squires. Her work on The Back Page and her interview program Breaking Ground earned her two Astra Awards, including the 2015 award for Most Outstanding Female Presenter.

In 2017, she called the AFLW on Fox Footy; being the station head caller for the competition, her role expanded in 2020 when she returned calling AFL men's football on television.

In February 2018, Underwood replaced Gerard Whateley as host of Offsiders after he resigned from the ABC. In November 2024, Underwood announced her resignation from the show with her last show on 1 December.

Throughout her career, especially early on, Underwood has been subject to a large amount of criticism from viewers, which has been described as "disproportionate" and "gendered".
