= Auskick'n Around =

Auskick'n Around is an Australian children's television series which was broadcast on the Fox Footy Channel from 2003 until 2005. It was hosted by Matthew Lloyd and Brad Johnson and was based on the Auskick junior version of Australian rules football.

One of the winners was Jaye Eccleston in 2003.

== See also ==
- List of Australian television series
- List of longest-running Australian television series
