= Kate Sheahan =

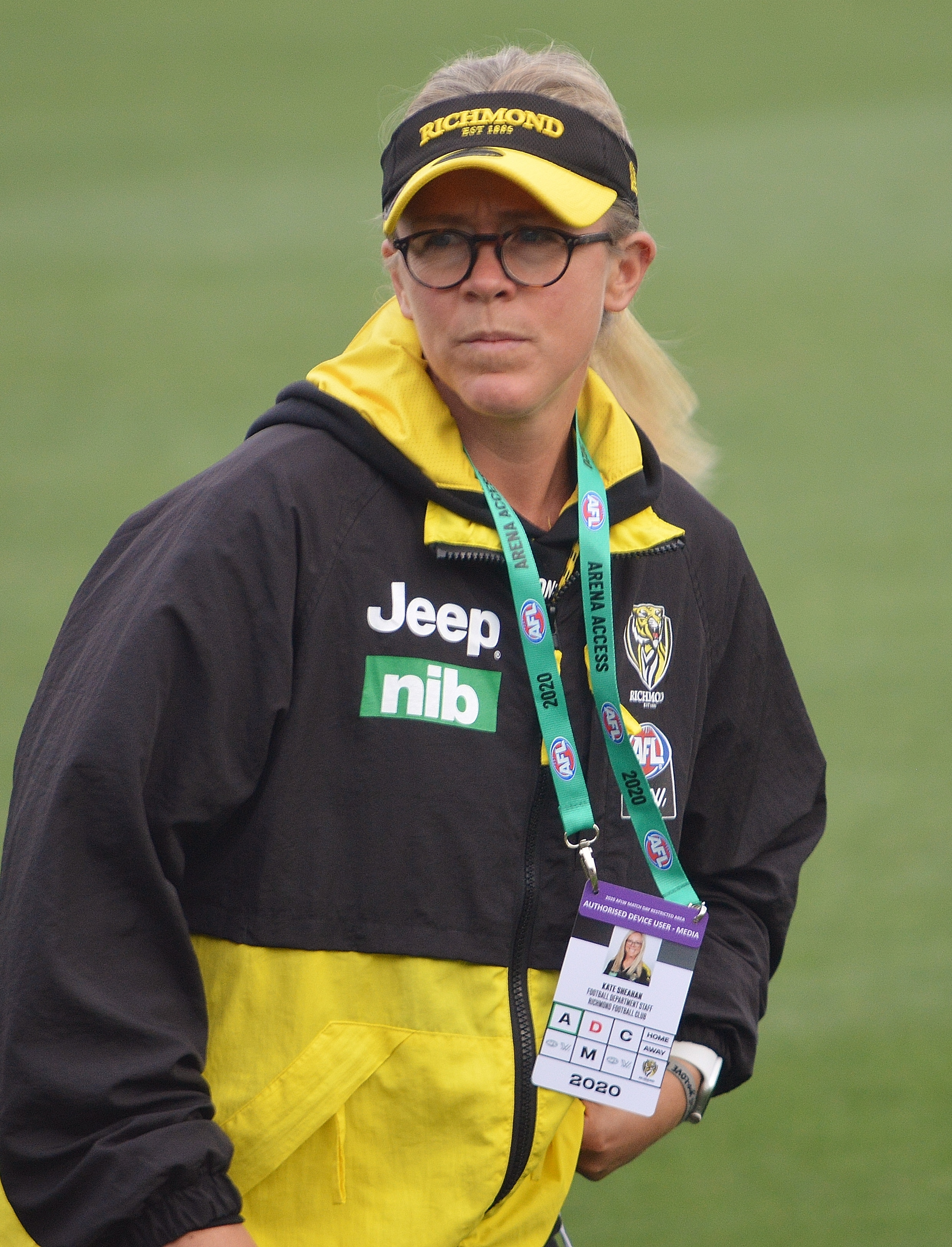
- Sheahan as Richmond administrator in February 2020

Personal information
- Born: 9 January 1982 (age 44)
- Draft: Rookie signing 2016: Collingwood
- Debut: Round 4, 2017, Collingwood vs. Western Bulldogs, at VU Whitten Oval
- Height: 165 cm (5 ft 5 in)
- Position: Utility

Playing career^{1}
Years	Club	Games (Goals)
2017	Collingwood	1 (0)
- ^{1} Playing statistics correct to the end of 2017.

Kate Sheahan (born 9 January 1982) is the Richmond AFLW (Australian Football League Women) football operations manager, a professional tennis coach noted for helping Daria Gavrilova return from a knee injury, and a former Australian rules football player who played for Collingwood in the 2017 AFL Women's season. She is the daughter of sports journalist Mike Sheahan.

== Biography ==
Sheahan played Australian football until she was fourteen as the only girl in a boys' league. She returned to football in 2005, but again ceased playing to concentrate on her tennis career after breaking her wrist while playing for Melbourne University Mugars in the Victorian Women's Football League. However, she was approached by Australian Football League CEO Gillon McLachlan to consider playing in the inaugural season of AFL Women's (AFLW), and was a rookie signing by Collingwood prior to the 2016 AFL Women's draft.

Sheahan was on the bench for most of the first half against Western Bulldogs in round four of the 2017 AFLW season. Within a minute of interchanging into the forward line, she received a season-ending knee injury. The injury may have ended her football career, but Sheahan stated she would play again if offered the opportunity.

The Richmond Football Club announced in May 2017 that they had hired Sheahan as full-time AFLW football operations manager in their push to obtain a licence for an expansion team in the 2019 season.
