= Candice Warner =

Australian ironwoman, surf life saver, and model

- Born: Candice Ann Falzon; 13 March 1985 (age 41); Sydney, New South Wales, Australia
- Occupation: Former ironwoman
- Notable work: I'm a Celebrity...Get Me Out of Here! (Australian TV series)
- Height: 5 ft 7 in (170 cm)
- Spouse: David Warner (m. 2015)
- Children: 3

Candice Ann Warner (née Falzon; born 13 March 1985) is an Australian retired professional ironwoman and surf life saver.

== Ironwoman ==
Candice first competed professionally at the age of 14 in the Ironman series. At 16 she was a NSW state ironwoman champion. In January 2008, she qualified for a spot in the 2008 Nutri-Grain Ironman & Ironwoman Series.

== Television appearances ==
Candice appeared on the 2008 series of It Takes Two, supporting the Beyond Blue charity but was eliminated sixth on 1 April 2008. Her mentor was Anthony Callea.

She was the subject of the Australian Story program on 9 June 2008.

In 2017, she appeared as a celebrity contestant on the Australian version of Hell's Kitchen. She came in tenth place, and the first one was eliminated.

In 2020, it was announced she would be participating in the Seven Network's reality program SAS Australia: Who Dares Wins.

She has been a regular panelist on The Back Page in 2022 and 2023.

In March 2024, she was announced as a celebrity contestant on the tenth season of I'm a Celebrity...Get Me Out of Here! . On 11 April 2024, Warner was the second celebrity to be eliminated; she came in 11th place.

== Book ==
In April 2023, Warner released a memoir entitled Running Strong.

== Personal life ==
Warner was born in Sydney, in the suburb of Maroubra. She is of Maltese heritage. She is the wife of Australian cricketer David Warner since 2015. They had their first child (a daughter) on 11 September 2014 and a second daughter on 14 January 2016 and a third daughter born on 30 June 2019. They live in Sydney.

Warner was previously in high-profile relationships with sporting stars such as Braith Anasta, Matt Henjak, Matt Poole, Brent Staker, Anderson Luis de Abreu Oliveira, David Carney and Marcos Baghdatis. She was also in a brief relationship with British comedian David Walliams.
