= Drew Morphett =

Australian sports broadcaster

- Born: Andrew Kenneth Morphett; 22 August 1948
- Died: 25 August 2017 (aged 69); Pakenham, Victoria
- Known for: Sports broadcaster

Andrew Kenneth "Drew" Morphett OAM (22 August 1948 – 25 August 2017) was an Australian sports broadcaster.

== Life ==
Morphett started his career as a sport specialist trainee in Sydney in 1966 at 18 years of age.

Over a long career, he worked on both ABC radio and television, most notably commentating Australian rules football (the VFL and AFL), but also tennis, cricket, basketball, motor racing, golf (including a British Open), lawn bowls and six Olympic Games, mainly commentating cycling, hockey and diving. He was the host of ABC TV's weekly VFL show The Winners for ten years during the 1980s.

He joined the Seven Network in 1988 as a commentator for Australian rules football matches. He also hosted Saturday Night Replay, which featured highlights of two of the Saturday afternoon AFL matches. He was discharged by Seven after the 2000 season. He worked for ABC radio as part of their ABC Grandstand team until being made redundant in 2014. He continued to commentate football matches on radio until his death in 2017. Drew was awarded an Order of Australia Medal as part of the 2014 Australia Day honours.

== Death ==
On 26 August 2017, it was announced that Morphett had died the previous evening while watching AFL football on television at his Pakenham residence in outer Melbourne.

He was married to Karen 'Kaz' Morphett.
