= Clinton Grybas =

Australian rules football and television commentator

- Born: Clinton Andrew Grybas; 9 February 1975
- Died: 5 January 2008 (aged 32); Melbourne
- Occupation: sports commentator
- Known for: Australian Football League, National Soccer League, National Basketball League commentator
- Partner: Laurenna Toulmin (?–2008; his death)

Clinton Andrew Grybas (9 February 1975 – 5 January 2008) was an Australian rules football and sports radio and television commentator.

== Career ==
His media career began at the South East Melbourne Magic basketball team as club journalist and gameday host before he gained a key role with the ABC in Melbourne and then in Perth, where he called and presented the ABC's coverage of Australian Football League matches. He anchored or commentated National Basketball League (NBL) and National Soccer League (NSL) games as well as Hopman Cup, golf, lawn bowls and racing events. His most memorable moment on air was calling the women's water polo gold medal match at the 2000 Sydney Olympics, which was won by Australia in the final seconds. He switched to commercial radio in 2001, where he joined Rex Hunt at 3AW to form the self-proclaimed "number one calling team" in the game. He continued to cover many different sports included the Australian Open, boxing and both the Formula One and MotoGP Grand Prix events. He commentated at two Olympic Games and three Commonwealth Games and was a Torchbearer in the Melbourne 2006 Commonwealth Games Torch Relay. In 2005 he was named AFL's Radio Broadcaster of the Year.

When the Fox Footy Channel began in 2002, Grybas became the new television channel's leading commentator and program host. He commentated games each week as well as hosting the nightly talkback show White Line Fever and the weekly wrap-up show The Winners. He continued to work for Fox Sports after the dedicated football channel was axed at the end of 2006.

== Death ==
Grybas was found dead at his home on the morning of 5 January 2008, aged 32, after he failed to turn up at 3AW to present the midday sports radio show. Apartment staff found him lying face down on his bedroom floor and rushed to hospital, where he was formally pronounced dead. A preliminary news report theorised that Grybas died as a result of head injuries due to a sleepwalking-induced accident. An autopsy was completed, but the results were not publicly released.

The response to his death was generally one of shock, and many fellow commentators and players believed that he was amongst the best sports commentators in Australia.

His funeral service on 15 January 2008 at CityLife Church in Wantirna South was open to the public and also broadcast on Foxtel. Over 1000 people attended, including his partner Laurenna Toulmin, parents Sandra and Vic Grybas, brother Ashley, and many sporting and media personalities.

He grew up in Warrandyte, was a Life Member of The Warrandyte Basketball Club, and was buried in Andersons Creek cemetery in that suburb.

On 25 March 2008, it was reported by 3AW's Derryn Hinch that Grybas had died of natural causes after suffering an allergic reaction to something he ate or drank the previous evening. His family, however, claim that the death was unascertained and that there has been no mention of an allergic reaction by the coroner.
