= Big Fish (band) =

Swedish rock band

Big Fish is a Swedish experimental rock music group with influences from industrial music, punk, jazz, blues, metal and folk music, adding up to a unique sound.

The band disbanded in 1996. They reunited in 2022.

== Discography ==
- The Natural Powers
- Hydrology (1990)
- Död mans vals (1991)
- Vargavinter (1992)
- Dans mot tiden (1993)
- Sånger ur sten (1994)
- Nyårshambo (1994)
- Blues för Paranoia (1996)
- Andar i halsen (1996)
- Kalla döda drömmar (2022)

=== On compilations ===
- Definitivt 50 Spänn #5
- Clubland X-Treme 2 (disc 1)
- Definitivt 50 Spänn IV
- I Sometimes Wish I Was Famous: A Swedish Tribute to Depeche Mode
