= Mark Robinson (journalist) =

Australian sports journalist

- Born: Bendigo, Victoria, Australia
- Occupation: Journalist
- Employer(s): Herald Sun, Fox Footy, 3AW
- Title: Chief football writer

Mark Robinson is an Australian retired sports journalist. He was the chief football writer for Melbourne's Herald Sun newspaper from 2011 to 2024. He regularly appeared on the 1116 SEN radio station's pre-match Australian Football League (AFL) discussion and co-hosted Fox Footy's AFL 360 television program till 2024.

== Career ==
A junior footballer for the Sandhurst Dragons in Bendigo and the Horsham Saints in Horsham, Robinson began covering football in 1992. Throughout his career he has predominantly covered Australian rules football and has been the chief football writer for the Herald Sun since 2012 following the retirement of Mike Sheahan.

Robinson co-hosted the AFL 360 television program on Fox Footy from 2010 until his sacking at the end of 2024. He previously appeared regularly as a panellist on AFL Game Day from the show's launch in 2008 until 2011 when AFL 360 expanded to four nights a week through the AFL season.

Robinson was a panellist on many of the 1116 SEN radio station's shows, including The Run Home and match day AFL discussion until the end of the 2017 season.

In 2018, Robinson joined 3AW as a panellist on the Sunday Sport show alongside Daniel Harford and Jimmy Bartel.

In the latter half of 2021, Robinson experienced multiple cardiac episodes which required medical attention, including open-heart surgery.

== Controversies and feuds ==
Robinson has been rumoured to have been involved in a variety of verbal and physical altercations with several fellow journalists, including Damian Barrett, Andy Maher and Michael Warner.

In June 2017, Robinson tweeted about Collingwood footballer Alex Fasolo when his struggles with severe depression became known, suggesting that the quickness of Fasolo's recovery was an indication he was faking his illness. He later deleted the tweet and apologised for what he said, with the Collingwood president later saying that Robinson ignored the club's medical advice when contacting Fasolo.

== Retirement ==
In January 2025, it was announced in the Herald Sun that Robinson would be leaving from his role as Chief Football Writer 13 years after replacing Mike Sheehan as Chief, and after four decades covering journalism.
