= Fox Footy =

Australian subscription television channel

- Fox Footy Logo
- Country: Australia
- Headquarters: Melbourne

Programming
- Language: English
- Picture format: 1080i (HDTV); 2160p (UHDTV)

Ownership
- Parent: Foxtel
- Sister channels: Fox Sports News; Fox Cricket; Fox League; Fox Netball; Fox Sports

History
- Launched: 17 February 2012

Links
- Website: foxsports.com.au

Availability

Streaming media
- Foxtel Go: Channel 504
- Kayo Sports: Channel 504

Fox Footy (stylised in all caps as FOX FOOTY) is an Australian rules football subscription television channel dedicated to screening Australian rules football matches and related programming. It is owned by Fox Sports Australia operated out of its Melbourne based studios and available throughout Australia on Foxtel, and Optus Television. The channel is a revival of the former Fox Footy Channel, which was in operation between 2002 and 2006. The channel recommenced prior to the 2012 AFL season after a new broadcast agreement was reached between the former Premier Media Group, Austar, Foxtel and the Australian Football League (AFL).

As of the week of 24 September 2023, the channel reached 753,000 viewers, making the highest rated channel owned by Fox Sports Australia and the second highest rated subscription channel on Foxtel behind Lifestyle. The channel will be renamed Kayo Footy in 2027.

== History ==
Foxtel had previously operated the original Fox Footy Channel from 2002 to 2006, but closed the channel when Foxtel's AFL broadcast deal ended at the end of the 2006 season after failing to agreeing at the time a new agreement with free-to-air broadcasters Seven and Ten. On 8 February 2007, Foxtel came to an agreement to broadcast four games a week from 2007 to 2011, up from three during 2002–2006 on Fox Sports channels, although it didn't include an AFL channel.

It was announced on 28 April 2011 that the channel would be revived for the 2012 AFL season, as part of the new broadcast rights deal that gave Foxtel rights to show all regular-season AFL matches live. The channel kept the Fox branding of its predecessor, which was originally licensed from 20th Century Fox in September 2001. It returned exclusively on Foxtel and its broadcasting partners, under the proposed new name of "Fox Sports AFL", which was later changed back to its original name "Fox Footy". The channel relaunched at 5:00 pm AEDT on Friday 17 February 2012 with the first NAB Cup round-robin match between Hawthorn, Richmond and North Melbourne.

Fox Footy has live broadcast rights to all Marsh Community Series matches, all AFLW home and away matches, all AFLW Finals matches including the Grand Final, all AFL home and away matches and all AFL Finals matches until the AFL Grand Final which is shown on delayed with the game being screened exclusively live on Seven. All matches are broadcast live to air in High Definition and 4K Ultra HD with no commercial breaks during play. When two live matches are being played simultaneously, Fox Sports 503 broadcasts one of the matches.

From the start of the 2012 AFL season, Fox Footy had become the most watched Pay-TV network in Australia. In 2017, the AFL preliminary finals had 556,000 and 441,000 viewers. Beginning in 2020, Fox Footy and more Fox Sports Australia channels began carried in Canada on the premium streaming service DAZN.

In 2018 Fox Sports commissioned the Andrews Hubs in Sydney and Melbourne allowing Fox Footy to produce matches at stadiums around the country from its base in South Melbourne.

The 2022 season saw some changes to the channel, with the network cutting ties with Eddie McGuire and the subsequent launch of two new programs, 'Best on Ground' and 'Face to Face' in addition to a time slot change for On the Couch. The network was rocked by further public interest during Round 1 after the termination of senior reporter Tom Morris after derogatory comments made against a colleague in a private chat were leaked publicly.

The 2025 season saw Foxtel have their own commentary teams and graphics on all matches for the first time, for the 2025 - 2031 seasons.

- Foxtel and its streaming service Kayo would broadcast every match of the season outside of the grand final, and would utilise its own commentary teams and graphics for all matches for the first time; another Foxtel streaming service, Binge, would also simulcast some matches and include other Foxtel football programs.
- All Saturday matches outside of marquee matches would be exclusively live on Foxtel and Kayo for the first eight rounds of the season nationally, and are live & exclusive outside of marquee matches to Foxtel & Kayo in Victoria, Tasmania and Northern Territory throughout the home and away season. This national live exclusivity period was changed to the first ten rounds starting in 2026, the same year Wildcard Finals were introduced.

== Programming ==
=== Current Programs ===
- AFL Tonight (2016–present on Fox Sports News and Fox Footy)
- AFL 360 (2010–2011 on Fox Sports, 2012–present on Fox Footy)
- Midweek Tackle (2024-present)
- On the Couch (2002–2006 on Fox Footy Channel, 2007–2011 on Fox Sports, 2012–present on Fox Footy)
- Bounce (2007–2011 on Fox Sports, 2012–present on Fox Footy)
- First Crack (2019–present)
- Trading Day (2018–present, post season)

=== Former Programs ===
- AFL Insider (2010–2011 on Fox Sports, 2012 on Fox Footy)
- The Club
- Ed & Derm's Big Week In Footy
- Eddie McGuire Tonight (2012)
- The Hangar
- The Recruit (2014–2016, also shown on Fox8)
- The Supercoach Show
- The Winners Rebooted (2015–2016 on Fox Footy)
- League Teams (2002–2006 on Fox Footy Channel, 2007–2011 on Fox Sports, 2012–2017 on Fox Footy)
- The Greatest (2017)
- Up The Guts (2019)
- On the Mark (2018–2019)
- The Beep Test (2018–2019)
- The Weekend Lowdown (2018)
- Open Mike (2009–2011 on Fox Sports, 2012–2020 on Fox Footy)
- Bob (2018–2019)
- Saturday Stretch (2017–2021)
- Speed Round (2020)
- Dermie Delivers (2021)
- Best On Ground (2022 as a weekly show, 2023 for special one-off shows)
- Face to Face (2022)

=== Events ===
==== Games ====
All AFL premiership matches are broadcast live, with no ads during game-play, excluding the AFL Grand Final and Brownlow Medal, which is shown delayed due to the Seven Network owning the exclusive broadcast rights. All official AFL Community Series matches are broadcast live, and club-organised match simulation matches are broadcast exclusively on Kayo Sports.

- AFL Community Series
- AFL Premiership Season
- AFL Finals Series (excluding AFL Grand Final)
- AFL Under 18 Championships
- AFLW premiership season
- AFLW Finals Series (including AFLW Grand Final)

==== Special events ====
- AFL Grand Final parade
- AFL Awards (All-Australian team, AFL Players Association awards, AFL Coaches Association awards, Coleman Medal)
- Australian Football Hall of Fame dinner
- National AFL draft

== Personnel ==
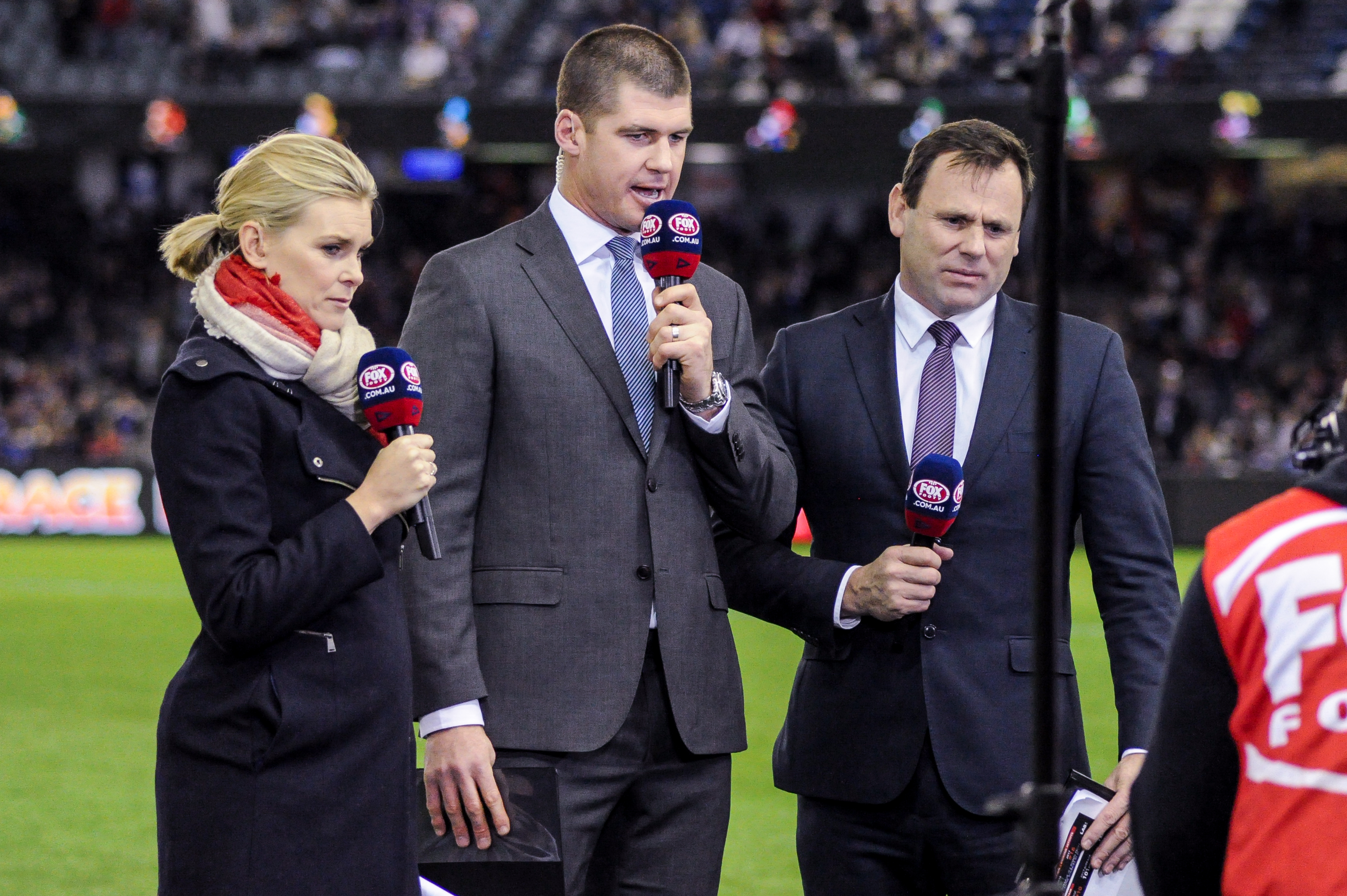
Commentators Sarah Jones, Jonathan Brown and David King on-air in 2017

Coverage of certain matches including Friday nights, public holidays and finals is picked up from the Seven Network. Fox Footy uses Seven's video feed for the actual match, including graphics and commentary, but all surrounding footage, including pre-match, post-match, and between quarters, is replaced with Fox Footy's own coverage of the match. As of 2025, Fox will have access to clean feeds of Seven's footage for such matches, allowing Fox Footy to use their own commentary, graphics, and breakaways in all matches.

=== Commentators ===
Play-by-Play Callers

- Dwayne Russell (2007–present)
- Anthony Hudson (2012–present)
- Adam Papalia (2016–present)
- Leigh Montagna (2018–present)
- Kelli Underwood (2020–present)
- Mark Howard (2020–present)
- Matt Hill (2024–present)
- Gerard Whateley (2025–present)
- Corbin Middlemas (2025–present)
- Jess Webster (2026–present)

Special comments

- Jason Dunstall (2002–present)
- Gerard Healy (2004–present)
- Alastair Lynch (2005–present)
- Mark Ricciuto (2010–present)
- David King (2010–present)
- Brad Johnson (2011–present)
- Ben Dixon (2012–present)
- Cameron Mooney (2013–present)
- Jonathan Brown (2015–present)
- Nick Dal Santo (2017–present)
- Garry Lyon (2018–present)
- Leigh Montagna (2018–present)
- Jordan Lewis (2020–present)
- Eddie Betts (2021–present)
- Nathan Buckley (2022–present)
- Will Schofield (2022–present)
- Jack Riewoldt (2024–present)
- Ruby Schleicher (2024–present)
- Shaun Burgoyne (2025–present)
- Tom Hawkins (2025–present)
- Leigh Matthews (2025–present)
- Adam Simpson (2025–present)
- Ken Hinkley (2026–present)
- Michael Voss (2014, 2026–present)

Studio & Match day hosts

- Sarah Jones (2016–present)
- Garry Lyon (2018–present)
- Kelli Underwood (2018–present)
- Jason Dunstall (fill-in host, 2018–present)
- Kath Loughnan (2020–present)
- Ben Dixon (2024–present)
- Mark Howard (2024–present)

Journalists

- Jon Ralph (2012–present)
- David Zita (2022–present)
- Jay Clark (2025-present)
- Lauren Wood (2025-present)

=== Hosts & contributors ===
AFL 360

- Gerard Whateley (host) (2010–present)
- Garry Lyon (host) (2025–present)
- Ray Chamberlain (Tuesday panellist)
- Adam Simpson (Wednesday panellist)
- John Longmire (Wednesday panellist)

On the Couch

- Jack Riewoldt (host, 2025–present)
- Jonathan Brown (panellist, 2015–present)
- Nathan Buckley (panellist, 2023–present)
- Jordan Lewis (panellist, 2025–present)
- Leigh Matthews (monthly panellist, 2025–present)
- Jon Ralph (reporter, 2022–present)

Bounce

- Jason Dunstall (host, 2007–present)
- Andrew Gaze (panellist, 2020–present)
- Cameron Mooney (panellist, 2016–present)
- Bernie Vince (rotating panellist, 2019–present)
- Ben Dixon (rotating panellist, 2021–present)

First Crack

- Jay Clark (Sunday host) (2025–present)
- Ben Dixon (Wednesday host) (2025-present)
- David King (panellist) (2019–present)
- Leigh Montagna (panellist) (2019–present)

AFL Tonight

- Ruby Schleicher (Monday host)
- Drew Jones (Wednesday, Thursday & Friday host/reporter)
- David Zita (Tuesday host/Tribunal reporter)
- Jon Ralph (reporter)

=== Former ===
The following are former commentators and panel show members

- Kevin Bartlett (2002–2006)
- Jason Bennett (2002–2006)
- Matthew Campbell (2002–2006, 2008–2015)
- Wayne Carey (2005–2006)
- Tiffany Cherry (2002–2006)
- Clinton Grybas (2002–2007)
- John Casey (2007–2008)
- James Hird (2008–2010)
- Brian Taylor (2009–2011)
- Rohan Smith (2007–2011)
- Liam Pickering (2007–2011)
- Glen Jakovich (2007–2012)
- Leigh Colbert (2007–2013)
- Barry Hall (2012–2016)
- Tony Shaw (2002–2017)
- Sandy Roberts (2014–2018)
- Brian Lake (2016–2018)
- Danny Frawley (2007–2019)
- Paul Roos (2011–2013, 2017–2019)
- Neroli Meadows (2017–2019)
- Ben Waterworth (2018–2019)
- Mike Sheahan (2002–2020)
- Sarah Olle (2017–2021)
- Eddie McGuire (2012–2021)
- Tom Morris (2015–2022)
- Brenton Speed (2017–2022)
- Nick Riewoldt (2018–2022)
- Tony Armstrong (2021–2022)
- Mark Robinson (2010–2024)
- Dermott Brereton (2012–2025)
- Matthew Pavlich (2017–2025)

== Logo history ==
17 February 2012 – 25 February 2015

26 February 2015 – present

== Watch AFL ==
Outside of Australia, Fox Footy operates Watch AFL, a global streaming network. The network streams all games live, including the Grand Final, unlike its domestic counterpart, who broadcasts that game on delay. This service is being retired in November 2026; eligible subscriptions are being moved to DAZN, who acquired Foxtel, owner of Fox Footy, in 2025.

== See also ==
- Fox Cricket
- Fox League
- Fox Netball
- List of sports television channels
