= Big Fish Golf Club =

- Location within Wisconsin
- 45.99126°N 91.39753°W

Club information
- Type: public
- Tota holes: 18
- Website: golfbigfish.com
- Designed by: Pete Dye

The Big Fish Golf Club is a public golf course in Hayward, Wisconsin, in Sawyer County, Wisconsin, United States. Golfweek has rated it the "#7 Public Course in Wisconsin". It was designed in 2004 by the renowned golf architect, Pete Dye.

== Hole By Hole ==
Hole #	Par	Black	Blue	White	Yellow	Red
1	4	409 Yds	379 Yds	325 Yds	301 Yds	265 Yds
2	5	555 Yds	525 Yds	513 Yds	475 Yds	435 Yds
3	3	166 Yds	149 Yds	137 Yds	118 Yds	95 Yds
4	4	515 Yds	437 Yds	387 Yds	359 Yds	309 Yds
5	4	375 Yds	337 Yds	315 Yds	290 Yds	242 Yds
