= AFL Insider =

2010 Australian TV talk show

- Genre: AFL Program
- Presented by: Jason Dunstall; Alastair Lynch
- Country of origin: Australia
- Original language: English
- No. of seasons: 5

Production
- Production locations: Melbourne, Australia
- Running time: 60 minutes

Original release
- Network: Fox Sports (2010-2011); Fox Footy (2012-)
- Release: 6 July 2010 – present

AFL Insider is an Australian AFL talk show that deals with the issues in the AFL. It airs on Fox Sports on 6 July 2010, beginning at 7:30 pm later moves to Fox Footy.

== Hosts ==
- Jason Dunstall
- Alastair Lynch

== See also ==
- List of Australian television series
- List of longest-running Australian television series
