= Fox Footy Channel =

Channel dedicated to Australian football

- Country: Australia

Programming
- Language: English
- Picture format: 576i (SDTV)

Ownership
- Owner: Foxtel

History
- Launched: 6 March 2002
- Replaced: C7 Sport (Optus)
- Closed: 1 October 2006
- Replaced by: Fox Sports 3

The Fox Footy Channel was a channel exclusively dedicated to Australian rules football. It was owned by Foxtel and operated out of their Melbourne-based studios. From 2002 to 2006 it was available on Foxtel, Austar, Optus Television, TransTV and Neighbourhood Cable until transmission ceased on 1 October 2006. The channel was revived as Fox Footy for the 2012 AFL season after a new broadcast agreement was reached between Fox Sports and the AFL.

== History ==
The channel was created in 2002 after a multiple-network consortium won the television broadcast rights to the AFL for the 2002 to 2006 seasons. It granted free to air rights to the Nine Network and Network Ten and granted the subscription rights to Foxtel. The Fox branding for the channel was licensed from U.S. studio 20th Century Fox in September 2001. The studio was owned by Rupert Murdoch's News Corporation, who also owned a 65% stake in Foxtel.

Fox Footy was originally offered by Foxtel for an additional subscription during the first two seasons of the rights agreement; however, it was moved to the Basic package in February 2004, making it available to all Foxtel subscribers without additional charge for the balance of its life.

Due to broadcasting rights, each state had a separate version of the channel to allow free-to-air right holders exclusive live coverage. For example, if Channel Nine or Channel Ten broadcast a match between the Adelaide Crows and Sydney Swans live in Adelaide, Fox Footy would have been prevented from showing the match live, whereas if Nine or Ten didn't broadcast it in Melbourne, Fox Footy would be allowed to show it live there. Fox Footy typically repeated all matches after they were played, although often with the commentary of the free-to-air network that presented it live originally. Fox Footy only broadcast the AFL and not any state football leagues such as SANFL, WAFL or VFL.

=== End of the channel ===
The future of the channel was placed in doubt after the Seven Network and Network Ten were awarded the AFL rights from 2007 to 2011. On 23 August 2006, Foxtel announced the Fox Footy Channel would cease broadcasting at the conclusion of the current AFL season and be replaced with Fox Sports 3. Foxtel CEO Kim Williams stated "It's not financially viable to continue operating a 24-hour-a-day (Australian rules) football channel when we can only get three live games a week and not on the terms we have sought." The channel ended after a replay of the 2006 AFL Grand Final at 4.00am. Seven and Ten later came to terms with Foxtel and four games per round will be shown on pay-TV through the Fox Sports channels.

=== Revival ===
It was announced on 28 April 2011 that the channel will be revived for the 2012 AFL season. The channel returned exclusively on Foxtel and its broadcasting partners, under the proposed new name of Fox Sports AFL, which was later changed back to its original name Fox Footy. The channel relaunched on Friday 17 February 2012 with the first NAB Cup round-robin match between Hawthorn, Richmond and North Melbourne broadcast that night. Fox Footy broadcasts all NAB Challenge games exclusively, all home and away matches and all finals matches (except for the Grand Final which screens exclusively on Seven). All matches are broadcast live to air in both Standard and High Definition with no commercial breaks during play. When two live matches are being played simultaneously, Fox Sports 1 broadcasts one of the matches. Football personalities and commentators who signed or re-signed to be a part of the relaunched channel included Eddie McGuire (who commentates one non-Collingwood match a week and hosts his own talk show), Gerard Healy, Paul Roos, Jason Dunstall, Dwayne Russell, Brad Johnson, Alastair Lynch, Tony Shaw, Liam Pickering, David King, Danny Frawley, Mark Ricciuto, Glen Jakovich, Anthony Hudson and Dermott Brereton.

== Former 2002–2006 commentary team ==
- Clinton Grybas
- Matthew Campbell
- Jason Bennett
- Kevin Bartlett
- Gerard Healy
- Jason Dunstall
- Wayne Schwass
- Mark Aiston (Saturday Adelaide Games Only)
- Kym Dillon (Sunday Adelaide Games Only)
- Chris McDermott (special comments) (Adelaide Games Only)
- Tim Gossage (Saturday Perth Games Only)
- Peter Wilson (special comments) (Perth Games Only)
- Alastair Lynch (special comments)
- Tony Shaw (special comments)
- Wayne Carey (special comments)
- Scott Cummings (boundary rider)
- Tiffany Cherry (boundary rider)
- Glenn Manton (boundary rider)
- Richard Osborne (boundary rider)

The Sunday afternoon game covered by Fox Footy usually had the combination of Grybas, Carey and Healy; Saturday afternoon saw Bennett, Schwass, Lynch or Shaw; while Bartlett and Campbell were among the Saturday night match commentators.

== Programming ==
Fox Footy produced and aired shows, including:

- White Line Fever
- Saturday Central
- On the Couch
- Living With Footballers
- AFL Lovematch
- The Gospel
- Grumpy Old Men
- Classic Quarters
- The Fox Footy Archive
- Fox League Teams
- Fox Footy Feature
- From The FOX Footy Vault
- Footy Flashbacks
- Auskick'n Around - Featuring "The Lynch Mob"
