= Offsiders =

Australian sports television series

- A previous Offsiders title card
- Genre: Sports
- Presented by: Abbey Gelmi
- Country of origin: Australia
- Original language: English
- No. of seasons: 19

Production
- Running time: 30 minutes

Original release
- Network: ABC
- Release: February 2006 – present

Offsiders is an Australian television sport program. Hosted by Abbey Gelmi, the show airs live on Sunday mornings at 10:00 am on ABC TV and ABC News.

== History ==
The show began airing in February 2006 (after Insiders, its news/politics sister show which airs on ABC TV at 9:00 am on Sunday mornings, and Inside Business, a business program hosted by Alan Kohler which aired on ABC TV at 10:00 am on Sunday mornings until its axing in 2013). From 2005 until 2013, the show aired at 10:30 am. After Inside Business' axing in September 2013, since 2014, it has been airing at 10:00am. Episodes are normally 30 minutes in duration.

== Hosts ==
In 2005, Barrie Cassidy was the inaugural host of the program and hosted from 2005 to 2013.

In 2014, Gerard Whateley was appointed as host of the program replacing Cassidy. Whateley remained as host until his resignation in January 2018.

In February 2018, Kelli Underwood was appointed as host of the program. In November 2024, Underwood announced her resignation from the show with her last show on 1 December.

In January 2025, Abbey Gelmi was appointed as host of the program replacing Underwood.

Presenter	Tenure
Barrie Cassidy	2006–2013
Gerard Whateley	2014–2017
Kelli Underwood	2018–2024
Abbey Gelmi	2025–present

== Reception ==
Paul Connolly of The Age praised the show, writing, "Offsiders" has a pleasingly understated feel about it, not least because it forwards the radical idea (these days at least) that you don't have to be a big name former player to have something worthwhile to say about sport. If anything, it allows for opinion unfettered by allegiances which, in turn, allows for a few well-aimed barbs and not just a "sport's great, mate" attitude." In a negative review, The Australian's Lara Sinclair said Outsiders is "just a pale imitation of a sports program" and "Offsiders purports to bring the same level of challenging discourse to the sporting arena but there's no doubt Insiders packs the heavier punch."
