= Ben Dixon (Australian footballer) =

Australian rules footballer

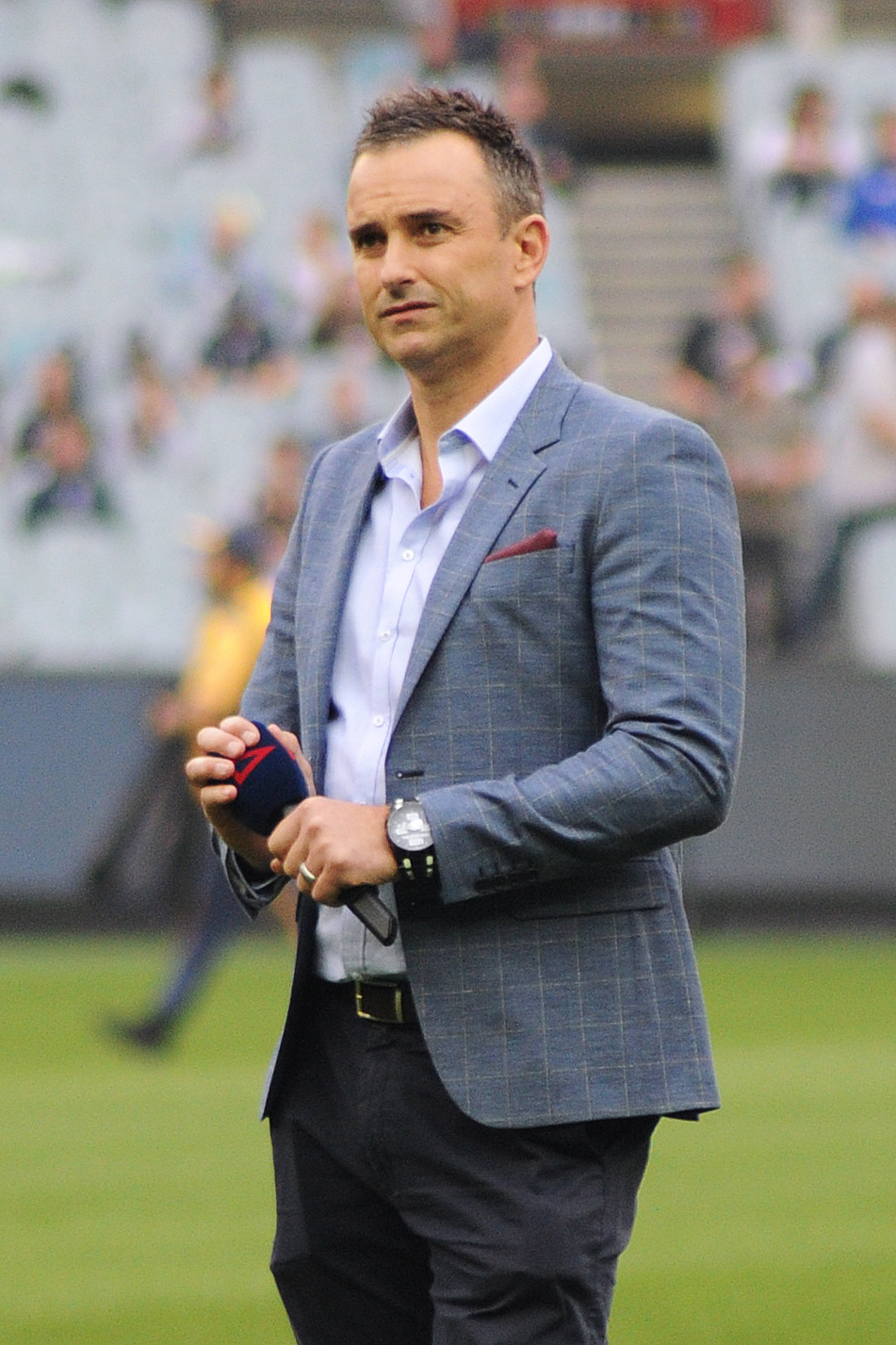
- Dixon with Fox Footy in April 2018

Personal information
- Full name: Ben Dixon
- Nickname: Dicko
- Born: 14 June 1977 (age 49); Victoria
- Original team: Assumption College / Yarrawonga
- Height: 188 cm (6 ft 2 in)
- Weight: 89 kg (196 lb)

Playing career^{1}
| Years | Club | Games (Goals) |
| 1995–2007 | Hawthorn | 203 (282) |
- ^{1} Playing statistics correct to the end of 2007.

Career highlights
- 1999 night premiership

Ben Dixon (born 14 June 1977) is a former professional Australian rules footballer who played for the Hawthorn Football Club in the Australian Football League (AFL). He was the selected by Hawthorn at pick number 77 as a fifth round selection in the 1994 national draft.

== AFL career ==
He debuted in 1997 and kicked 282 goals as a forward including a goal to win the game after the siren against Carlton in round 17, 2001.

Dixon retired at the end of the 2007 season.

== Post-football career ==
After retiring, he appeared on Future Stars and as a commentator for Fox Footy.

In 2017, Dixon joined St Kilda as their goalkicking coach.

Midway through 2021, he became a rotating panellist on Bounce, a light-hearted television show based on Australian rules football. He stars alongside host Jason Dunstall, NBL legend Andrew Gaze and former AFL player Cameron Mooney, while rotating with fellow former AFL player Bernie Vince. During his appearances on the show, Dixon presents two segments called Dicko's Social Life and The Golden Fist Award.

== Personal life ==
His father, Joe Dixon, played a handful of games with the Fitzroy Football Club in 1963.
