= Jordan Lewis =

Australian rules footballer (born 1986)

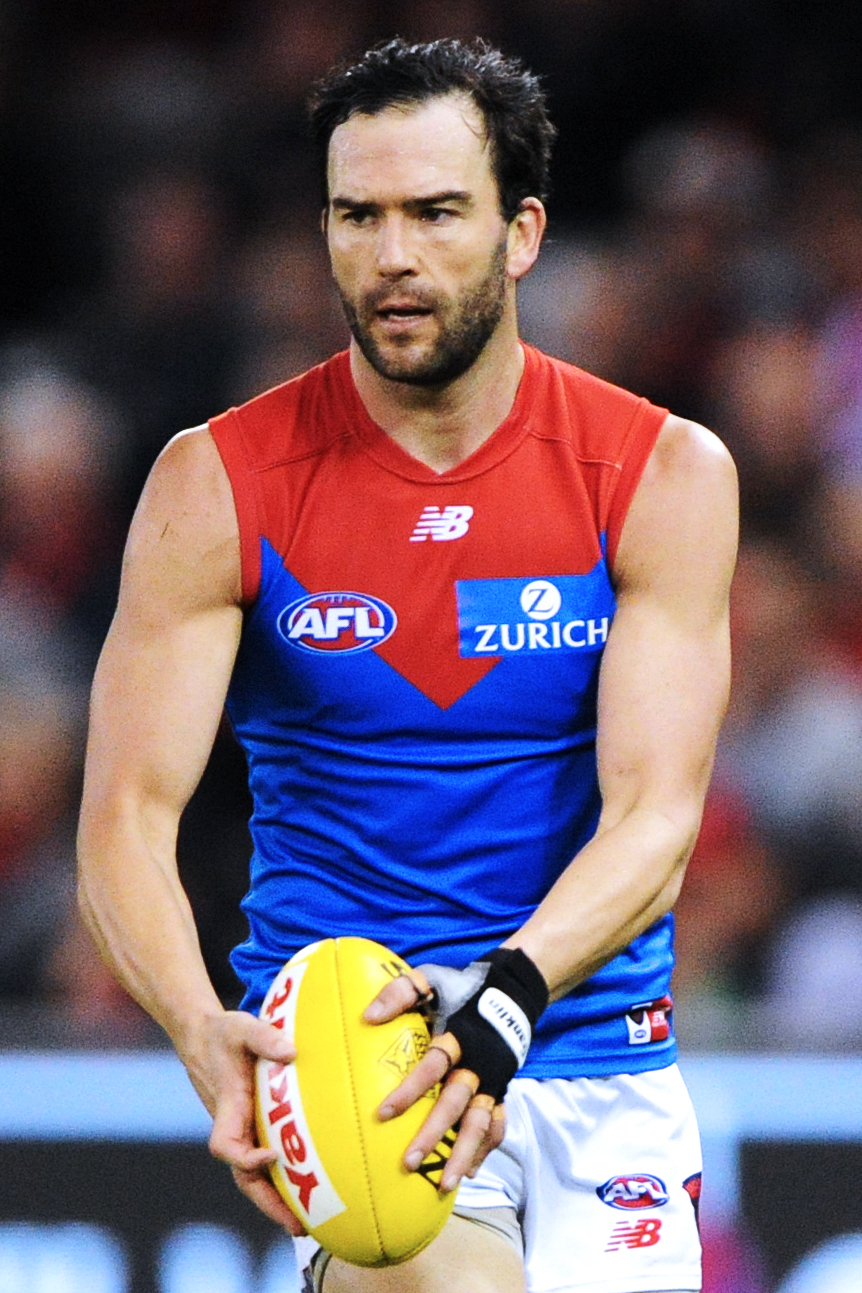
- Lewis playing for Melbourne in April 2018

Personal information
- Full name: Jordan Michael Lewis.
- Nicknames: Lewy, Taz
- Born: 24 April 1986 (age 40)
- Original team: Warrnambool (Hampden FNL) Geelong Falcons (TAC Cup)
- Draft: No. 7, 2004 national draft
- Debut: Round 3, 2005, Hawthorn vs. Essendon, at Melbourne Cricket Ground
- Height: 186 cm (6 ft 1 in)
- Weight: 86 kg (190 lb)
- Position: Midfielder / half-back

Playing career^{1}
Years	Club	Games (Goals)
2005–2016	Hawthorn	264 (145)
2017–2019	Melbourne	55 (16)
Total		319 (161)
- ^{1} Playing statistics correct to the end of 2019.

Career highlights
- 4× AFL premiership player: 2008, 2013–2015; All-Australian team: 2014; Peter Crimmins Medal: 2014

Jordan Michael Lewis (born 24 April 1986) is a former Australian rules football player who played with the Hawthorn Football Club and Melbourne Football Club in the Australian Football League.

== AFL career ==
=== Hawthorn ===
Lewis was drafted by Hawthorn with Pick 7 in the 2004 AFL draft. Hawthorn originally had intended to draft Lewis with Pick 10, but were concerned that Lewis would not be available by that point, and so the club made a trade with Collingwood in order to gain Pick 7. He made his AFL debut in season 2005.

Lewis was voted Hawthorn's best first-year player in 2005. He was a 2005 nominee for the AFL Rising Star award.

In 2008, Lewis was part of the Hawthorn team that won the premiership against Geelong.

A Hawthorn vice-captain in 2012, Lewis led the side while captain Luke Hodge was sidelined during the early part of the season.

In 2014 Lewis played his 200th AFL game in Round 7, as the Hawks defeated St Kilda by 145 points. Jordan also won his third premiership for Hawthorn as well as earning his first ever Peter Crimmins Medal.

At the end of the 2015 season, Lewis became one of only seven current AFL players to have won four AFL premierships.

=== Melbourne ===
At the conclusion of the 2016 season, Lewis was traded to the Melbourne Football Club.

On 20 August 2019, Lewis announced that he would retire at the end of the season. He was flanked by his only two AFL coaches, Alastair Clarkson and Simon Goodwin, at his retirement press conference.

== Statistics ==
Legend
G	Goals	K	Kicks	D	Disposals	T	Tackles
B	Behinds	H	Handballs	M	Marks
#	Played in that season's premiership team	†	Led the league for the season

Season	Team	No.	Games	Totals							Averages (per game)							Votes
Season	Team	No.	Games	G	B	K	H	D	M	T	G	B	K	H	D	M	T	Votes
2005	Hawthorn	40	19	2	1	151	156	307	86	39	0.1	0.1	7.9	8.2	16.2	4.5	2.1	0
2006	Hawthorn	3	20	5	2	216	177	393	117	39	0.3	0.1	10.8	8.9	19.7	5.9	2.0	2
2007	Hawthorn	3	24	14	6	310	285	595	177	52	0.6	0.3	12.9	11.9	24.8	7.4	2.2	8
2008^{#}	Hawthorn	3	20	6	6	232	269	501	127	24	0.3	0.3	11.6	13.5	25.1	6.4	1.2	9
2009	Hawthorn	3	19	9	7	243	255	498	113	45	0.5	0.4	12.8	13.4	26.2	5.9	2.4	2
2010	Hawthorn	3	23	15	7	272	232	504	136	62	0.7	0.3	11.8	10.1	21.9	5.9	2.7	7
2011	Hawthorn	3	22	12	8	267	228	495	123	68	0.5	0.4	12.1	10.4	22.5	5.6	3.1	2
2012	Hawthorn	3	22	27	15	243	247	490	108	67	1.2	0.7	11.0	11.2	22.3	4.9	3.0	1
2013^{#}	Hawthorn	3	24	17	10	280	244	524	116	91	0.7	0.4	11.7	10.2	21.8	4.8	3.8	4
2014^{#}	Hawthorn	3	24	17	9	338	330	668^{†}	136	92	0.7	0.4	14.1	13.8	27.8	5.7	3.8	15
2015^{#}	Hawthorn	3	23	9	3	357	308	665	149	72	0.4	0.1	15.5	13.4	28.9	6.5	3.1	8
2016	Hawthorn	3	24	12	8	324	309	633	133	100	0.5	0.3	13.5	12.9	26.4	5.5	4.2	11
2017	Melbourne	6	19	5	3	216	284	500	93	47	0.3	0.2	11.4	14.9	26.3	4.9	2.5	2
2018	Melbourne	6	24	5	2	285	255	540	115	37	0.2	0.1	11.9	10.6	22.5	4.8	1.5	0
2019	Melbourne	6	12	6	3	116	77	193	41	23	0.5	0.3	9.7	6.4	16.1	3.4	1.9	0
Career			319	161	90	3850	3656	7506	1770	858	0.5	0.3	12.1	11.5	23.5	5.5	2.7	71

== Honours and achievements ==
Team

- 4× AFL premiership player (Hawthorn): 2008, 2013, 2014, 2015
- 2× Minor premiership (Hawthorn): 2012, 2013

Individual

- All-Australian team: 2014
- Peter Crimmins Medal: 2014
- AFL Rising Star nominee: 2005
- Under 18 All-Australian team: 2004
- Hawthorn life member

== Personal life ==
Lewis is married to Lucy (Freer), and they have 4 sons: Hugh, Freddie, Ollie and Bobby. His first son was born in 2015, days before he played in the 2015 AFL Grand Final. Lewis carried the newborn onto the podium as he was awarded his medallion.

== Post-playing career ==
Following his retirement, Lewis became a part-time coach at Melbourne, helping with players' kicking skills and in a development role for younger players.

Lewis is a commentator for Fox Footy and SEN as an expert commentator.
