= Big Fish (TV series) =

- Genre: Fishing show
- Presented by: Marc Vincent
- Country of origin: Australia
- Original language: English
- No. of seasons: 1

Production
- Running time: 60 minutes

Original release
- Network: One
- Release: 6 January 2012 – present

Big Fish is an Australian fishing show aired on One on 8 January 2012 hosted by Marc Vincent.
