= Gerard Whateley =

Australian sports journalist (born 1974)

- Born: Gerard Whateley; 28 October 1974 (age 52); Melbourne, Victoria, Australia
- Occupation: Journalist
- Years active: 1993−present
- Employer(s): Herald Sun, Fox Footy, SEN1116

Gerard Whateley (born 28 October 1974) is a Melbourne-based sports broadcaster and writer. He is regarded by many as Australia's pre-eminent sports broadcaster.

Since January 2018, he has been chief sports caller and host of the Whateley program on the sports radio station SEN1116. He is also co-host of Fox Footy's AFL 360 and an occasional sports columnist for the Herald Sun newspaper.

Whateley's sport broadcasting career has included calling major Australian and international events, including 21 AFL Grand Finals, International Cricket both in Australia and abroad, the Melbourne Cup and both swimming (London and Rio) and athletics (Paris) at the Summer Olympics. Whateley traveled to Royal Ascot in 2012 to call Australia's racehorse Black Caviar win the Diamond Jubilee Stakes and wrote a book on the horse's career. He is the first and only Australian to call the Super Bowl play-by-play, a broadcast he has delivered since Super Bowl LII in Minnesota.

== Career ==
=== Early career ===
Whateley started his media career at the Herald Sun newspaper in 1993. His early experiences as a journalist were broad incorporating police rounds, courts and state politics before he became the paper's movie writer and editor of HIT magazine (the Herald Sun's movie and music lift out). He was later appointed senior writer for the newly released Sunday Magazine in 1998. During this period Whateley interviewed Steven Spielberg, Jack Nicholson and Leonardo DiCaprio among other stars.

=== Television career ===
Whateley was a foundation member of the Network 10 AFL commentary team when the broadcast rights were secured in 2001. Whateley was a panelist on the ABC Sunday morning sports show Offsiders from its inception in 2005, and was elevated to host in 2014.

In the middle of the 2010 season, Fox Footy premiered AFL 360, which featured Whateley as co-host alongside Herald Sun Chief Football Writer Mark Robinson.

In 2024, SEN and Fox Footy released Whateley on loan to Nine Network to call the Athletics at the Paris Olympic Games. He called the Men's 100 metre final - “heartstopper in Paris” – and the “rare treasure” of Jess Hull's silver medal in the Women's 1500 metres. Whateley's calling was hailed by The Australian newspaper as “cementing his status as Australia’s best sports broadcaster.” (August 12, 2024).

In 2025, Whateley began commentating AFL matches for Fox Footy on Friday nights alongside Anthony Hudson.

=== Radio career ===
Whateley began calling AFL games on ABC Radio in 2002 and moved full time to the National Broadcaster in September 2004. Over the next 14 years he would call every major sport in Australia from Australian Open tennis, to President's Cup golf to A-League Grand Finals alongside Ange Postecoglou. Principally Whateley led the Grandstand AFL coverage, called the Melbourne Cup from 2008, took on the ABC's remodeled Test Cricket coverage from 2015, and covered three Olympic Games in Beijing, London and Rio where Whateley called Kyle Chalmers's gold medal victory in the 100 metres freestyle in the pool.

In January 2018, he joined Melbourne sports radio station 1116 SEN as chief sports caller and host of the morning program. Whateley debuted on 29 January 2018 with Roger Federer as the headline guest. Whateley heads the cricket commentary team from the Ashes to tours of India and numerous World Cups.

=== Super Bowl ===
Whateley is the first and only Australian to call America's showpiece sporting event the Super Bowl. He has provided the play-by-play call of NFL's biggest game annually since 2018 in Minnesota for Super Bowl LII.

== Publications ==
In 2012, Whateley wrote a book about Australian thoroughbred racehorse Black Caviar, Black Caviar: The Horse of a Lifetime. Later that year, Whateley rejoined the Herald Sun as a columnist.

== Awards ==
- Four-time winner of the Australian Football Media Association's "Alf Brown Trophy", awarded to the most outstanding media performer.
- Inaugural winner of the Harry Gordon Australian Sports Journalist of the Year.
- Australian Commercial Radio Awards Best Sports Presenter.
- Ten times acknowledged for the Best Sport Coverage by a broadcaster at the Australian Sports Commission Awards.

== Personal life ==
Whateley and his wife Claire have three children and live in Melbourne They first met when they were teenagers at their local church in the south-eastern Melbourne suburb of Mulgrave.

Whateley supports the Geelong Football Club.
