= Gregory C. Marshall Naval Architect =

Gregory C. Marshall Naval Architect Ltd.
- Industry: Naval Architecture and Marine Engineering
- Founded: 1994
- Founder: Gregory C. Marshall
- Headquarters: Victoria, British Columbia, Canada
- Key people: Gregory C. Marshall (CEO); Gordon Galbraith (VP)
- Number of employees: 18 (2015)
- Website: www.gregmarshalldesign.com

Gregory C. Marshall Naval Architect Ltd. (GCMNA) of Victoria, British Columbia, Canada, is a designer of international luxury yachts. The company was established in 1994 by Gregory C. Marshall and with partner Gordon Galbraith, who joined the company in 1998, currently employs a design team of 30 employees.

GCMNA has been involved with more than 400 vessels in designs including styling, engineering, mechanical, electrical, interior design and decorating. In collaboration with many well known shipyards, including Burger Boat Company, Christensen Shipyards, Ocean Alexander, and Westport Shipyards. In 2012, the magazine Superyacht World voted the GCMNA-designed yacht Big Fish "one of the top 50 yachts of all time".

== Big Fish ==
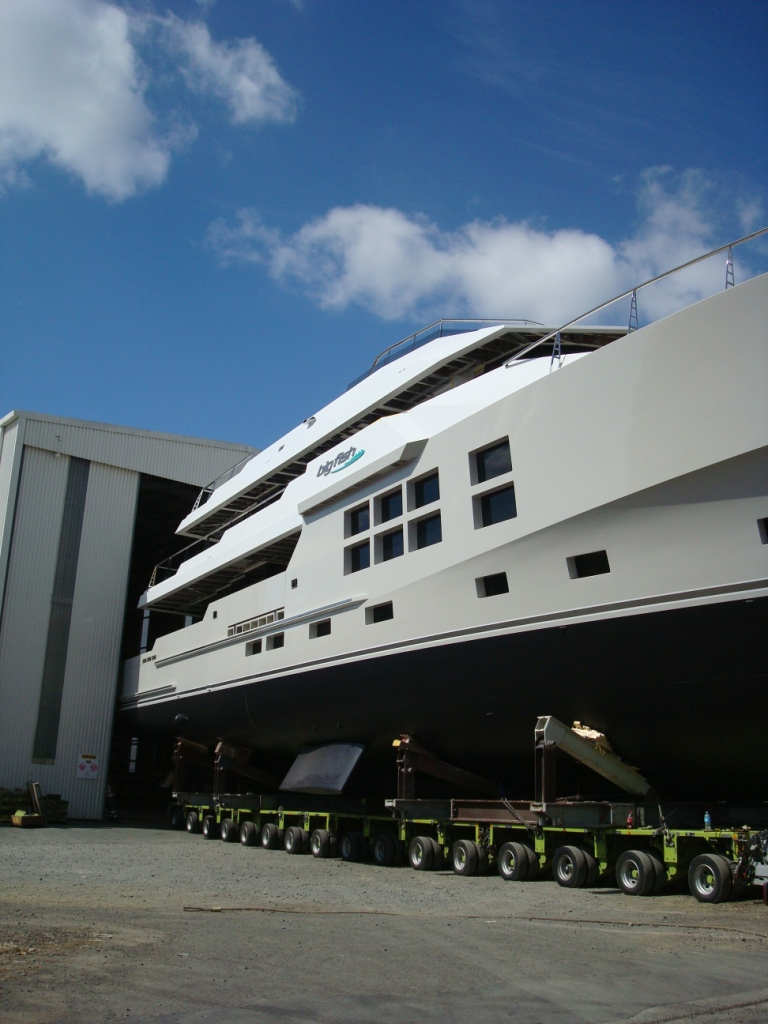

Big Fish is an expedition (explorer yacht) type steel displacement luxury motor yacht constructed by McMullen and Wing of Auckland, New Zealand. Originally built for Hong-Kong businessman Richard Beattie to explore remote parts of the world, it is capable of being away for long periods of time. It has 5 guest cabins with accommodation for 10.

== Awards ==
- Top 50 finest yachts ever built –Superyacht World 2013
- International Superyacht – Society Awards 2011
- Showboats International Awards 2011
- World Yachts Trophy 2010
- Asian Boat Awards 2011
