= Brad Johnson (Australian footballer) =

Australian rules footballer (born 1976)

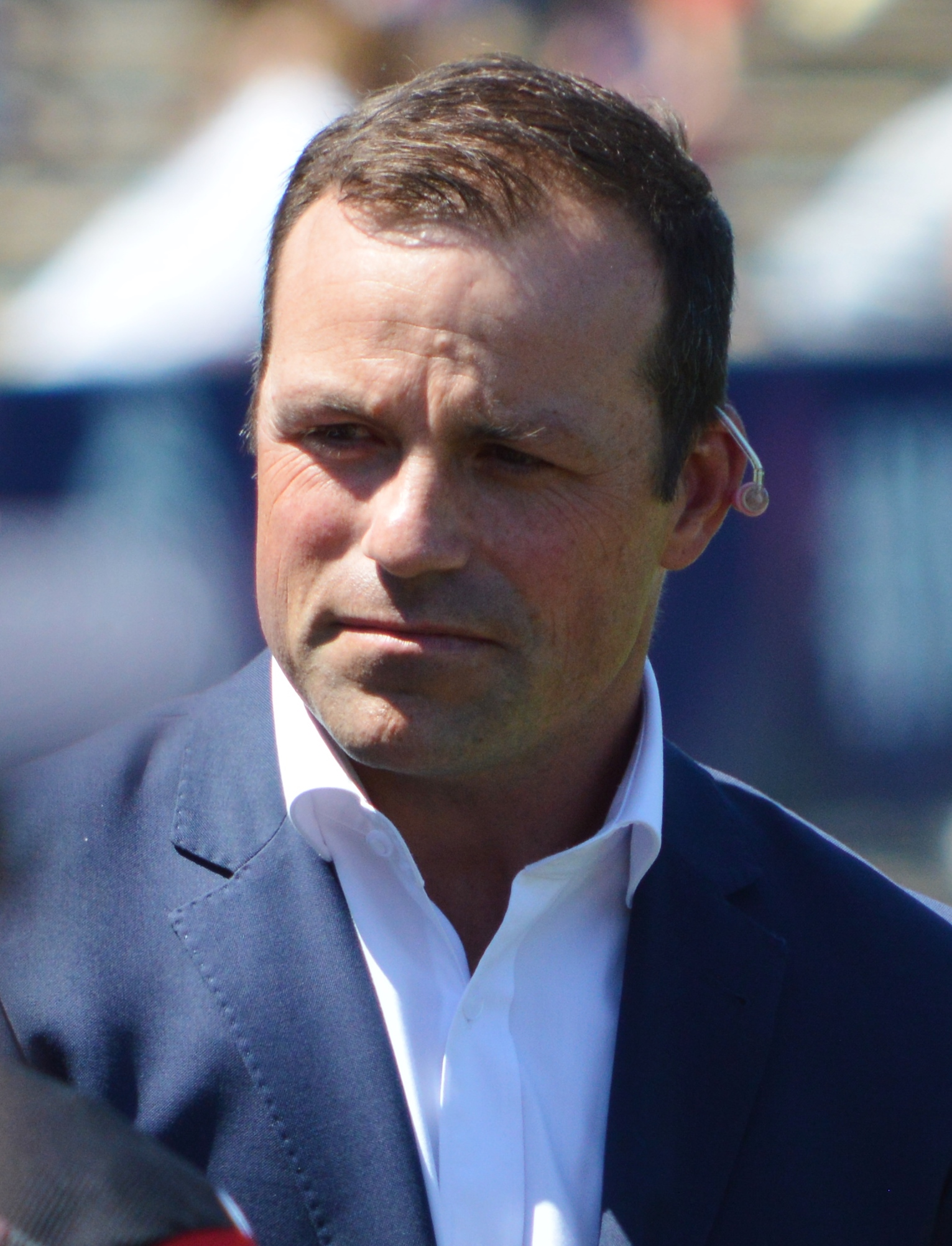
- Johnson working for Fox Footy at a pre-season match in March 2017

Personal information
- Full name: Brad Johnson
- Nicknames: Johnno, Smiling Assassin, Springboard
- Born: 18 July 1976 (age 50); Hoppers Crossing, Victoria
- Original team: Western Jets
- Draft: 11th overall, 1993; Western Bulldogs
- Height: 182 cm (6 ft 0 in)
- Weight: 87 kg (192 lb)
- Position: Forward

Playing career^{1}
| Years | Club | Games (Goals) |
| 1994–2010 | Western Bulldogs | 364 (558) |
- ^{1} Playing statistics correct to the end of 2010.

Career highlights
- 3x Charles Sutton Medal: 1999, 2002, 2006; 5x Western Bulldogs leading Goalkicker: 2001, 2005, 2006–2008; 6x All-Australian Team: 1999, 2000, 2002, 2005, 2006 (c), 2007; Western Bulldogs Captain: 2007–10; AFL Rising Star nominee: 1995; Western Bulldogs Team of the Century; Australian Football Hall of Fame

Brad Johnson (born 18 July 1976) is a former Australian rules footballer who was the captain of Australian Football League team Western Bulldogs. Despite his small size for his position, he was considered to be one of the best forwards in the game because of his overhead marking ability, and he also had the ability to play across half forward or in the midfield.

== AFL career ==
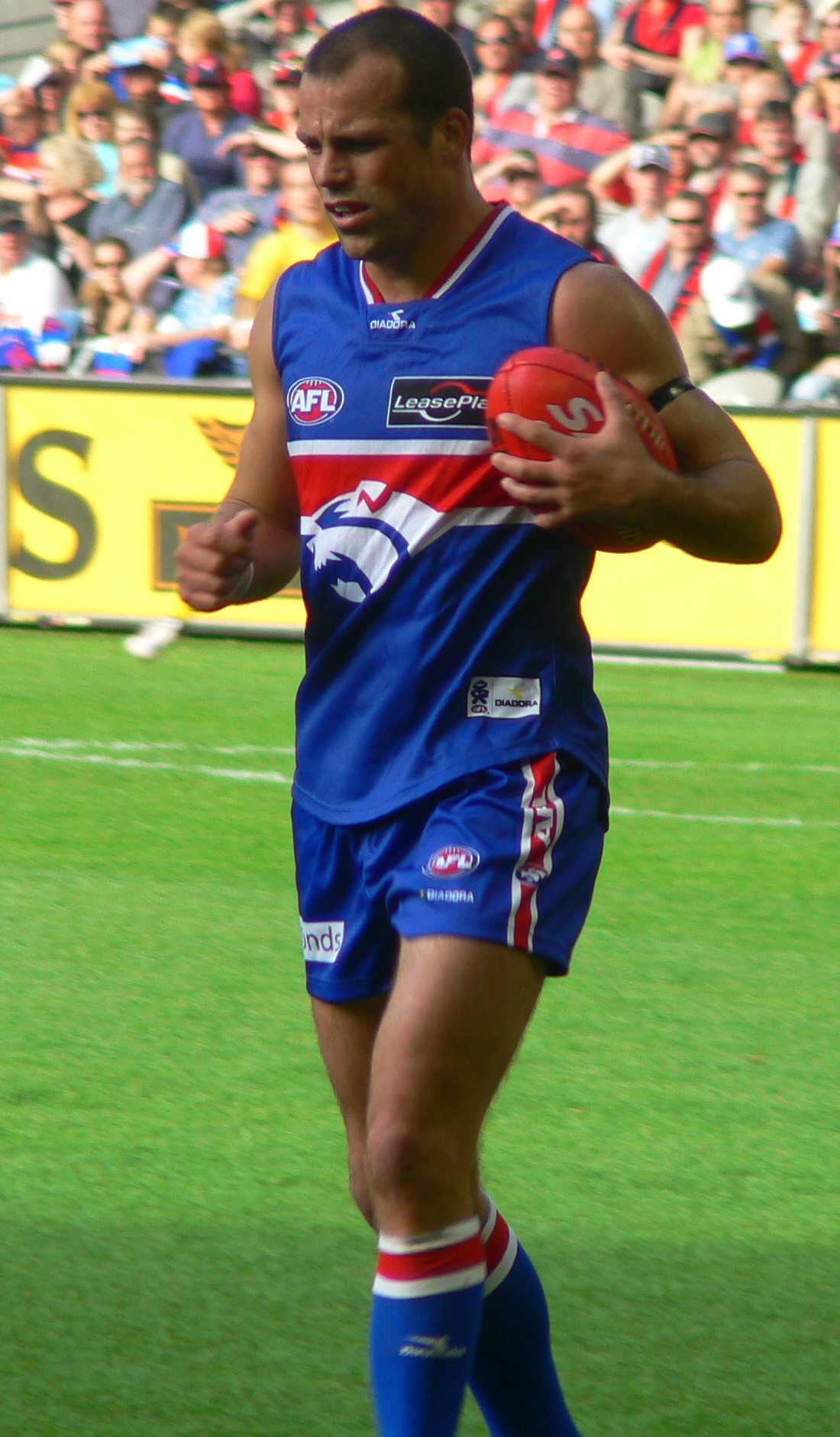
Brad Johnson preparing to kick for goal during the 2007 AFL season

=== Footscray/Western Bulldogs career ===
Johnson made his debut in the 1994 season, and he is known for his roles as a damaging forward or midfielder. Known as the "Smiling Assassin" due to the constant smile on his face, he is a popular figure around the club and has won three best and fairest awards – in 1999, 2002 and 2006.

In 1996, Johnson, along with the entire Western Bulldogs club (then known as the Footscray Football Club), was filmed for the documentary Year of the Dogs, which was released in 1997. The documentary followed the turbulent 1996 season, during which the Dogs finished in the second-last position on the ladder.

In 1997, Johnson and the Dogs had a good season. They finished third on the ladder and made it to the preliminary final. In that game, the Dogs faced the Adelaide Crows and led at the final break by five goals. In the fourth quarter, the Crows made a stirring come back to win the game by 2 points. Johnson played in several other preliminary finals in his career, but he never competed in a Grand Final.

In 2000, Johnson was a part of the Bulldogs side that ended Essendon's winning streak of 20 games in the classic round 21 clash. The Dogs defeated the Bombers in a fierce contest by just 2 goals. Right on half-time Essendon player John Barnes turfed Johnson and left him concussed. That led to a vicious brawl between the teams. At the end of the game Johnson ran on the field and confronted Barnes, giving him the last word. The Dogs were the only team to beat Essendon that year, who went on to win the premiership.

Johnson was the springboard in what many consider to be the greatest mark in the history of the AFL when Gary Moorcroft took the mark of the year in 2001, earning him the nickname "Springboard". It is considered to be the greatest mark of all time by many, including in a 2021 AFL-run poll of more than 30,000 fans, where Moorcroft won with 25% of the vote.

Johnson has represented Australia in International Rules Football in 1998, 2000, 2002, 2003.

In 2005, he kicked a Goal of the Year contender – an amazing soccer-style half volley from an extremely tight angle on the boundary line.

Johnson has been selected in the All-Australian Team in 1999, 2000, 2002, 2005, 2006 and 2007. In 2006 he was chosen as captain of the Bulldogs following the injury of Luke Darcy and also as captain of the All-Australian Team. Under Johnson's leadership, the Bulldogs made the finals for the first time since 2000. In their Elimination Final, the Dogs defeated Collingwood by 41 points. They were knocked out in the semi-finals by West Coast. Johnson capped off his 2006 season by finishing second in the Coleman Medal with 70 goals, an amazing feat considering that he had played the final 11 games of the season with a shoulder injury that later required surgery.

In round one of the 2007 season, Johnson kicked a career-high eight goals against the eventual premiers, Geelong. Despite several impressive wins, the Dogs didn't make finals that year.

He started the 2008 season against the Adelaide Crows in his 300th game and kicked five second-half goals, including three in the last seven minutes as the Bulldogs came out on top by three points. The Dogs continued this season with many impressive performances and even finished third on the ladder. Their remarkable season came to an end when they lost to a strong Geelong side in the Preliminary Final by just under five goals. That same year Johnson was selected to represent the Victorian football team in the AFL Hall of Fame Tribute Match, although Johnson pulled out just weeks before the match.

In his later seasons, Johnson twice had the misfortune of missing shots for goal after the final siren to win the game. In Round 9, 2008, against North Melbourne, Johnson missed a shot at goal from 35 metres out on a 45-degree angle. A year later in the same round, Johnson had the same opportunity but this time against the Geelong Cats from 10 metres in front of goal on a tight angle in which he also missed.

The 2009 season was another marginally successful season for the Dogs under Johnson's captaincy. For the second consecutive year the Bulldogs finished third on the ladder. They played their final game in a Preliminary Final blockbuster against the Saints, losing by just 7 points.

On 1 August 2009, Johnson became the games record holder for the Western Bulldogs. With 342 games, he surpassed Chris Grant's old record of 341 games for the club. Johnson went on to play a total of 364 games for the Western Bulldogs and as of 2022 remains the club's record holder for most games played.

In 2010, whilst recovering from a previous injury Johnson, was struck by the club's drinks cart in training. His then manager, Ricky Nixon, later said that the resulting injury was worse than Johnson and the club let on and that it hastened the end of Johnson's career. On 6 September 2010, Johnson announced his retirement from AFL at the end of the 2010 season. Johnson played his final game on 18 September 2010, after the Bulldogs' second consecutive loss to St Kilda in a preliminary final.

On 4 June 2014, Johnson was inducted into the Australian Football Hall of Fame.

=== Playing positions ===
Brad Johnson regularly played as a half-forward flanker; however, when he was heavily tagged or out of the play, he was able to play as a forward pocket or midfielder.

== Statistics ==
Legend
| G | Goals | K | Kicks | D | Disposals | T | Tackles |
| B | Behinds | H | Handballs | M | Marks |

| Season | Team | No. | Games | Totals | | | | | | | Averages (per game) | | | | | | |
| Season | Team | No. | Games | G | B | K | H | D | M | T | G | B | K | H | D | M | T |
|---|---|---|---|---|---|---|---|---|---|---|---|---|---|---|---|---|---|
| 1994 | Footscray | 33 | 9 | 7 | 7 | 90 | 24 | 114 | 23 | 8 | 0.8 | 0.8 | 10.0 | 2.7 | 12.7 | 2.6 | 0.9 |
| 1995 | Footscray | 6 | 21 | 10 | 9 | 199 | 91 | 290 | 78 | 33 | 0.5 | 0.4 | 9.5 | 4.3 | 13.8 | 3.7 | 1.6 |
| 1996 | Footscray | 6 | 22 | 14 | 13 | 264 | 85 | 349 | 90 | 20 | 0.6 | 0.6 | 12.0 | 3.9 | 15.9 | 4.1 | 0.9 |
| 1997 | Western Bulldogs | 6 | 24 | 16 | 15 | 375 | 125 | 500 | 122 | 25 | 0.7 | 0.6 | 15.6 | 5.2 | 20.8 | 5.1 | 1.0 |
| 1998 | Western Bulldogs | 6 | 24 | 29 | 14 | 330 | 133 | 463 | 120 | 26 | 1.2 | 0.6 | 13.8 | 5.5 | 19.3 | 5.0 | 1.1 |
| 1999 | Western Bulldogs | 6 | 24 | 26 | 21 | 382 | 162 | 544 | 133 | 22 | 1.1 | 0.9 | 15.9 | 6.8 | 22.7 | 5.5 | 0.9 |
| 2000 | Western Bulldogs | 6 | 21 | 32 | 16 | 346 | 121 | 467 | 120 | 35 | 1.5 | 0.8 | 16.5 | 5.8 | 22.2 | 5.7 | 1.7 |
| 2001 | Western Bulldogs | 6 | 22 | 48 | 32 | 327 | 109 | 436 | 124 | 36 | 2.2 | 1.5 | 14.9 | 5.0 | 19.8 | 5.6 | 1.6 |
| 2002 | Western Bulldogs | 6 | 22 | 44 | 28 | 334 | 154 | 488 | 137 | 47 | 2.0 | 1.3 | 15.2 | 7.0 | 22.2 | 6.2 | 2.1 |
| 2003 | Western Bulldogs | 6 | 22 | 42 | 23 | 335 | 167 | 502 | 146 | 40 | 1.9 | 1.0 | 15.2 | 7.6 | 22.8 | 6.6 | 1.8 |
| 2004 | Western Bulldogs | 6 | 21 | 19 | 24 | 332 | 120 | 452 | 133 | 51 | 0.9 | 1.1 | 15.8 | 5.7 | 21.5 | 6.3 | 2.4 |
| 2005 | Western Bulldogs | 6 | 22 | 42 | 23 | 329 | 139 | 468 | 149 | 42 | 1.9 | 1.0 | 15.0 | 6.3 | 21.3 | 6.8 | 1.9 |
| 2006 | Western Bulldogs | 6 | 24 | 74 | 42 | 332 | 135 | 467 | 174 | 30 | 3.1 | 1.8 | 13.8 | 5.6 | 19.5 | 7.3 | 1.3 |
| 2007 | Western Bulldogs | 6 | 21 | 59 | 26 | 292 | 114 | 406 | 165 | 37 | 2.8 | 1.2 | 13.9 | 5.4 | 19.3 | 7.9 | 1.8 |
| 2008 | Western Bulldogs | 6 | 25 | 50 | 28 | 331 | 118 | 449 | 172 | 37 | 2.0 | 1.1 | 13.2 | 4.7 | 18.0 | 6.9 | 1.5 |
| 2009 | Western Bulldogs | 6 | 25 | 37 | 26 | 353 | 185 | 538 | 176 | 66 | 1.5 | 1.0 | 14.1 | 7.4 | 21.5 | 7.0 | 2.6 |
| 2010 | Western Bulldogs | 6 | 15 | 9 | 8 | 170 | 69 | 239 | 91 | 14 | 0.6 | 0.5 | 11.3 | 4.6 | 15.9 | 6.1 | 0.9 |
| Career | | | 364 | 558 | 355 | 5121 | 2051 | 7172 | 2153 | 569 | 1.5 | 1.0 | 14.1 | 5.6 | 19.7 | 5.9 | 1.6 |

== Honours and achievements ==
Brownlow Medal votes
| Season | Votes |
| 1994 | 0 |
| 1995 | 0 |
| 1996 | 2 |
| 1997 | 4 |
| 1998 | 7 |
| 1999 | 3 |
| 2000 | 6 |
| 2001 | 6 |
| 2002 | 4 |
| 2003 | 2 |
| 2004 | 3 |
| 2005 | 6 |
| 2006 | 19 |
| 2007 | 14 |
| 2008 | 0 |
| 2009 | 1 |
| 2010 | 0 |
| Total | 77 |

Individual

- All-Australian: 1999, 2000, 2002, 2005, 2006 (C), 2007
- Charles Sutton Medal (Footscray F.C./Western Bulldogs B&F): 1999, 2002, 2006
- Footscray F.C./Western Bulldogs Leading Club Goalkicker Award: 2001, 2005-2008
- Australian Representative Honours in International Rules Football: 1998, 2000, 2002, 2003
- AFL Rising Star Nominee: 1995 (Round 7)
- Footscray F.C./Western Bulldogs Captain: 2007–2010
- Footscray F.C. Team of the Century - Interchange

== Media and personal life ==
Brad Johnson is married to Donna Johnson and they have two children, Ella and Jack.

Johnson co-hosted children's AFL show Auskick'n Around on Fox Footy Channel with former Essendon Football Club captain Matthew Lloyd before the show was cancelled at the end of 2005.

Brad Johnson is currently the Mix 101.1 Resident Footy Expert on Friday Morning with Brigitte Duclos and Anthony Lehmann.

He has also appeared as a panellist on the Seven Network's AFL Game Day as well as on their coverage of the 2010 AFL Grand Final.

After retirement Johnson made his debut for 3AW Football and Fox Sports in season 2012.

In 2013, he contributed to the website The Roar under the moniker of Johnno.

In 2016, Johnson took part in the EJ Whitten Legends Game. He wore The Big V and was one of the best on ground, kicking 3 goals.
