= Mike Sheahan =

Australian rules football journalist

Michael Sheahan
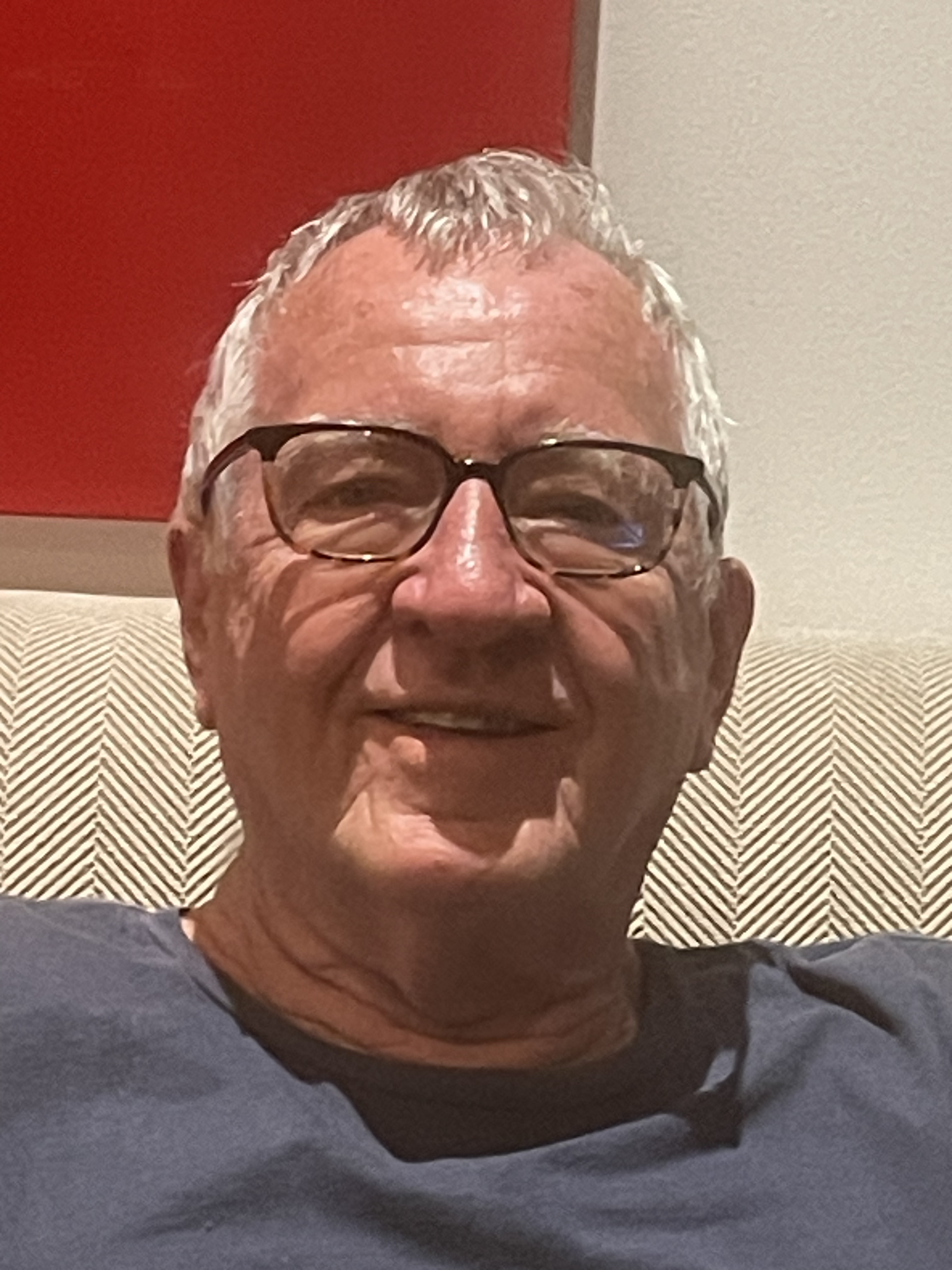
- Born: 3 March 1947 (age 79)
- Occupation: Retired (former sports journalist)
- Employer(s): Fox Footy, 3AW, Herald Sun
- Children: 4, including Kate Sheahan

Michael Sheahan (born 3 March 1947) is an Australian journalist who specialises in Australian rules football. He was chief football writer and associate sports editor for the Herald Sun for 18 years. Although he left these positions at the end of 2011, he still writes special columns for the newspaper, including his yearly "Top 50" player list. He was also a panelist on the Fox Footy program On the Couch and former media director for the Australian Football League (AFL, formerly VFL). He also joins Brian Taylor, Matthew Richardson, Matthew Lloyd and Leigh Matthews in the 3AW radio station's pre-match football discussion on Saturday afternoons. In addition he conducted a weekly interview program on Fox Footy, Open Mike until September 2020 when he would be retiring after a 19 year stint at Fox Footy. In February 2018, he joined a podcast with former St Kilda coach Grant Thomas and a former co-host of The Footy Show, Sam Newman, entitled Sam, Mike and Thomo; it aired once weekly and talks about all trending topics, with a sprinkling of commentary on AFL. However, upon that being cancelled in March 2019, in August that year he joined another podcast, entitled Sam, Mike and Don, You Can Not Be Serious, with Newman and former VFL footballer Don Scott. The podcast airs in a similar format and covers similar topics to the previous one. He was a part of this until June 2020, when he quit the podcast for a second time due to the fallout of a comment made by Scott about former AFL footballer Nicky Winmar. The podcast continued as You Can Not Be Serious with Sam Newman being the only core member.

One of his most widely known contributions to football writing is his biannual list of the Top 50 players in the Australian Football League. Sheahan prepares a ranked list at the beginning of each season of the 50 players he believes will be the best or have the most influence during the upcoming year; then, another list at the end of the season ranking the 50 best players of the year. The lists are always hotly debated. In 2008, Sheahan was given the task by the AFL to compile a list of the Greatest 50 players of all time, to be published in the book The Australian Game of Football, which honoured the 150th anniversary of Australian rules football.

The media centre at AFL House in Melbourne is named in his honour.

Sheahan is the cousin of former Test cricketer Paul Sheahan. He had a brief football career himself, playing 66 senior matches for the Werribee Football Club in the Victorian Football Association and for North Hobart Football Club in the Tasmanian Football League. Sheahan has stated, when commenting on which team he supports, that he is more a fan of the game, than of a particular team, but has stated he has a soft spot for the Melbourne Football Club.
