= AFL 360 =

Australian sports TV series

- Genre: AFL program
- Presented by: Gerard Whateley; Garry Lyon
- Country of origin: Australia
- Original language: English
- No. of seasons: 15
- No. of episodes: 1,500+

Production
- Executive producer: Tim Hodges
- Production locations: Melbourne, Australia
- Running time: 60 minutes

Original release
- Network: Fox Sports (2010–2011); Fox Footy (2012–present)
- Release: 7 July 2010 – present

AFL 360 is an Australian television talk show that covers current issues in the Australian Football League (AFL). It airs on Fox Footy at 6:30 pm Mondays to Wednesdays during the AFL season. It is hosted by Gerard Whateley and Garry Lyon, and features players, coaches and experts as regular guests.

== History ==
AFL 360 was launched as a weekly show on Fox Sports in 2010, hosted by Gerard Whateley and Mark Robinson, airing on Wednesday nights, and continued as such in 2011. In 2012, the show moved to the re-launched Fox Footy channel, a sister channel to Fox Sports dedicated to AFL.

From 2012 to the beginning of the 2020 season, the show's regular schedule was each Monday to Thursday evening during the AFL season, except for Thursday nights on which an AFL match was played.

For the 2020 AFL season, when the AFL season recommenced after being suspended due to the due to the COVID-19 pandemic, the show's schedule became more flexible to fit in with the condensed AFL season, in which matches were played most nights each week but with varying start times.

Since the beginning of the 2021 regular season, the show has moved to a consistent Monday to Wednesday 7:30 pm schedule, with Thursday night AFL matches becoming a more frequent fixture throughout the season.

Each year there is a special edition on the Thursday or Friday before the AFL Grand Final, and a final episode of the season on the Monday after the Grand Final.

The show has also aired additional episodes during the season under the AFL 360 banner, such as an extended interview between Whateley and Mick Malthouse in 2015, just days after he was sacked as Carlton coach. On select occasions, the show has returned to air in the off-season to cover major breaking news in AFL. This has included in October 2013 to cover Lance Franklin’s nine-year deal with the Sydney Swans, and in January 2016 following the final Court of Arbitration for Sport judgement in the Essendon Football Club supplements controversy. The show also aired a special Friday night edition on 3 July 2015 to cover the death of Adelaide Crows coach Phil Walsh.

In July 2018, regular Tuesday guests Jack Riewoldt and Jordan Lewis hosted an episode of the show as part of a "player takeover" promotion across various Fox Footy shows.

A special Sunday night edition aired on 22 March 2020, following the decision to suspend the 2020 AFL season due to the COVID-19 pandemic.

The show celebrated its 1,000th episode on 16 September 2020.

In July 2021, Mark Robinson took medical leave from the program, along with all other media roles, and did not return as co-host for the rest of the season. The details of his medical condition were not publicised at the time. His co-hosting position was filled by a rotating roster of Fox Footy personalities. In the final episode of the year he appeared via video call and revealed that he had undergone emergency open heart surgery. He returned to his co-hosting role at the beginning of the 2022 season, and continued through to the end of the 2024 season.

In April 2022, on the first Thursday night since the start of the season to not feature an AFL match, a new edition of the program called AFL 360 Extra was screened. This first edition was hosted by Kath Loughnan and co-hosted by Nick Riewoldt and Jack Riewoldt. This edition would later be called AFL 360 Plus.

Garry Lyon joined Whateley as the new permanent co-host at the beginning of the 2025 season, as part of a revamp of the program.

== Current hosts ==
- Gerard Whateley
- Garry Lyon

== Former hosts ==
- Mark Robinson — 2010–2024

=== Fill-in hosts ===
==== For Whateley ====
- Garry Lyon

==== For Lyon ====
- Jason Dunstall
- Leigh Montagna
- Jordan Lewis
- Adam Simpson

==== Former fill-in hosts ====
- Jake Niall
- Eddie McGuire
- Mike Sheahan
- Anthony Hudson
- Kath Loughnan

== Regular guests ==
| | Monday | | Tuesday | | | | Wednesday | | | | Thursday | |
|---|---|---|---|---|---|---|---|---|---|---|---|---|
| 2010 | | | | | | | Mark Maclure | David King | | | | |
| 2011 | | | | | | | Mark Maclure | David King | | | | |
| 2012 | Mark Thompson | Rodney Eade | Robert Murphy | Brad Sewell | | | Mark Maclure | David King | | | Barry Hall | Cameron Mooney |
| 2013 | Mark Thompson | Rodney Eade | Robert Murphy | Brad Sewell | | | Mark Maclure | David King | | | Barry Hall | Cameron Mooney |
| 2014 | Mark Thompson | Paul Roos | Robert Murphy | Jordan Lewis | | | Mark Maclure | David King | | | Barry Hall | Cameron Mooney |
| 2015 | Nathan Buckley | Paul Roos | Brendon Goddard | Jordan Lewis | | | Mark Maclure | David King | Mark Thompson | | Barry Hall | Cameron Mooney |
| 2016 | Nathan Buckley | Chris Scott | Jack Riewoldt | Jordan Lewis | | | Mark Maclure | David King | Mark Thompson | | Dyson Heppell | Brian Lake |
| 2017 | Alan Richardson | Chris Scott | Jack Riewoldt | Jordan Lewis | | | Mark Maclure | David King | Mark Thompson | | Nick Dal Santo | Brian Lake |
| 2018 | Alan Richardson | Chris Scott | Jack Riewoldt | Jordan Lewis | | | Mark Maclure | David King | Robert Murphy | Nick Riewoldt | Jason Dunstall | Dermott Brereton |
| 2019 | Rotating Coaches | | Jack Riewoldt | Jordan Lewis | Adam Treloar | | Mark Maclure | David King | Robert Murphy | Nick Riewoldt | Jason Dunstall | Dermott Brereton |
| 2020 | Rotating Coaches | | Jack Riewoldt | Max Gawn | Adam Treloar | | Mark Maclure | David King | Jordan Lewis | Jarryd Roughead | No regular Thursday episodes | |
| 2021 | Rotating Coaches | | Jack Riewoldt | Christian Petracca | Adam Treloar | Mark Maclure | Leigh Montagna | David King | Jordan Lewis | Jarryd Roughead | No regular Thursday episodes | |
| 2022 | Rotating Coaches | | Rotating Players including Jack Riewoldt, Christian Petracca, Tom Hawkins, Zach Merrett, Adam Treloar & Lachie Neale | | | | Leigh Montagna | David King | Jordan Lewis | Eddie Betts | No regular Thursday episodes | |

== Segments ==
=== Regular (2025) ===
==== Monday - Coaches Night ====
- GVP (Garry's Valuable Player) - Introduced in 2025, the GVP award is decided by Lyon's 3-2-1 votes from the previous weekend, with the player with the most votes at the end of the season winning a Ford Mustang GT.
- The Coaches - A pre-season agreement from the AFL Coaches Association sees all 18 AFL coaches committed to appearing on the show and providing insights throughout the year.

==== Tuesday - Players Night ====
- Real or Overreaction - Whateley and Lyon present one-another with a particular statement, and decide whether it is real or an overreaction.
- The Players - High-profile players from across the competition join the show every Tuesday night to provide insights on the competition and the week ahead. Occasionally, players come from opposing teams of the marquee match from the upcoming weekend.
- Razor's Edge - Retired umpire Ray Chamberlain joins Whateley and Lyon to review the previous weekend's umpiring decisions and provide insight on the officiating side of the league.
- Tribunal Night - On weeks with high-profile hearings at the AFL Tribunal, Fox Footy and Herald Sun reporter David Zita joins the show to provide updates of the decisions and deliberations from AFL House.

==== Wednesday ====
- Simmo & Horse - Recently retired coaches Adam Simpson and John Longmire join the show weekly to preview the upcoming weekend of footy.
- Weekend's Picks - Whateley and Lyon select their "headline", "plot twist" and "last dollar" for the upcoming weekend.

=== Previous ===
- Who would you rather be? - The hosts select two names each that have been in the news that week (for good or bad reasons) and pose the question "Who would you rather be?"
- 360 seconds - The hosts give answers to several questions over six minutes
- The Bomber Diaries - Mark Thompson, in press conference style, takes questions from the hosts and viewers
- Monday hero (briefly Monday champion, when sponsored by McDonald's) - The hosts give their opinions on who were the heroes from the previous weekend's round of football.
- Two minute scramble - The hosts give answers to several questions over two minutes
- Tuesday matinee - The hosts select a non-football story that they enjoyed from the weekend
- Rascal of the Week - Robert Murphy bestows "Rascal" status on a person guilty of mischievous behaviour. In 2017, this segment was taken over by Jack Riewoldt.
- Wednesday love - The hosts select a person/club/event that they loved from the weekend
- Looking forward to? - The hosts give their opinions on what they are looking forward to on the weekend
- Weekend Forecast - The hosts suggest likely events/results that will occur over the weekend ("Sure Thing") and give scenarios that could happen on the weekend that would bring trouble or scrutiny onto a club or person ("Most at Stake" and "Doomsday Scenario"). Special guests often contribute to this segment.

=== Rascal of the Year ===
While Robert Murphy's Rascal of the Week concluded in 2014, he continued to present a Rascal of the Year award in grand final week until 2016. From 2017, Jack Riewoldt took over hosting the award. The winners are listed below.

| Year | Winner |
|---|---|
| 2012 | Steve Johnson |
| 2013 | Luke Hodge |
| 2014 | Mark Robinson |
| 2015 | Ross Lyon |
| 2016 | Cooper Woods^{1} |
| 2017 | Peter Steven |
| 2018 | Heidi Schwegler |
| 2019 | Stuart Dew |

Notes

- ^1Woods won the award as an Auskick player featured on a half-time broadcast

== Awards and nominations ==
| Year | Award | Category | Result |
|---|---|---|---|
| 2012 | Australian Football Media Awards | Most Outstanding Television Program | Won |
| 2013 | Australian Football Media Awards | Most Outstanding Television Program | Won |
| 2014 | ASTRA Awards | Most Outstanding Sports Entertainment Program | Nominated |
| 2015 | Australian Football Media Awards | Most Outstanding Television Program | Won |
| 2016 | Logie Awards | Best Sports Program | Nominated |
| 2016 | Australian Football Media Awards | Most Outstanding Television Program | Won |

== See also ==
- List of Australian television series
- List of longest-running Australian television series
