= List of Italian Australians =

This is a list of notable Italian Australians.

== Musicians ==
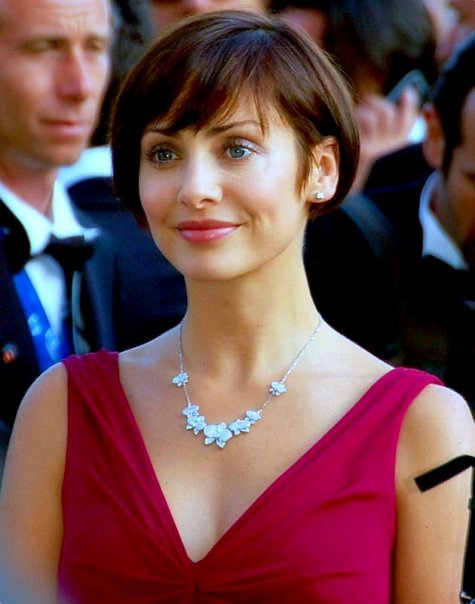
Natalie Imbruglia

- Vanessa Amorosi – singer, entertainer
- Tina Arena – singer, entertainer
- Christian Argenti – singer
- Chantelle Barry – singer
- Anthony Callea – singer, entertainer
- Emmanuel Carella – singer
- Nic Cester – singer-songwriter
- Gabriella Cilmi – singer
- Cosima De Vito – singer
- Joe Dolce – singer
- Bella Ferraro – singer
- Anthony Field – songwriter, producer
- Natalie Gauci – singer
- Laura Imbruglia – singer
- Natalie Imbruglia – singer, entertainer and actress
- Paul Kelly – singer
- Rachael Leahcar – singer
- Raffaele Marcellino – composer
- Indiana Massara – singer, model and actress
- Silvie Paladino – singer
- Giselle Rosselli – singer
- Reginald Alberto Agrati Stoneham (1879–1942) – composer; veteran of the Boer War
- Richard Tognetti – violinist, composer and leader of the Australian Chamber Orchestra
- The Veronicas – singers

== Actors and entertainers ==
- Jason Agius (born 1984) – actor
- Joe Avati (born 1974) – comedian
- Steve Bastoni (born 1966) – actor
- Natasha Liu Bordizzo (born 1994) – actress
- Richard Brancatisano (born 1983) – actor
- Scott Cam (born 1962) – presenter and actor
- Rachael Carpani (born 1980) – actress
- Santo Cilauro (born 1962) – comedian
- Diane Cilento (1932–2011) – actress
- Salvatore Coco (born 1975) – actor
- Vince Colosimo (born 1966) – actor
- Claudia Doumit (born 1992) – actress
- Leila George (born 1992) – actress
- Isabella Giovinazzo (born 1990) – actress
- Anthony LaPaglia (born 1959) – actor
- Jonathan LaPaglia (born 1969) – actor
- Marco Leonardi (born 1971) – actor
- Chas Licciardello (born 1977) – political satirist
- Paul Mercurio (born 1963) – actor
- Dina Panozzo – actress
- Oriana Panozzo (born 1959) – actress
- Danny Raco (born 1979) – actor and director
- Vince Sorrenti (born 1961) – comedian
- Philip D'Ambrosio (born 1991) – actor

== Arts ==
- Mario Andreacchio – director
- Felice Arena – author
- Ruth Borgobello – writer, director
- Santo Cilauro – producer and screenwriter
- Giorgio Mangiamele – filmmaker
- Melina Marchetta – author
- Patricia Piccinini – artist
- Pietro Porcelli – sculptor
- Tahyna Tozzi – director, writer and producer
- Paul Zanetti – political cartoonist
- Salvatore Zofrea – artist

== Journalists ==
- Emma Alberici – ABC journalist
- Christian Argenti – broadcaster
- Mark Beretta – sports journalist
- Paul Bongiorno – political journalist
- Jane Gazzo – broadcaster and music journalist
- Robert Grasso – SBS sports journalist
- Steve Pizzati – Top Gear presenter
- Leonardo Puglisi – journalist
- Michelangelo Rucci – sports writer
- Virginia Trioli – journalist

== Law ==
- Bernard Bongiorno – Victorian Supreme Court Judge
- Fabiano Cangelosi – Tasmanian lawyer and politician

== Models ==
- Bianca Censori – model and architect
- Stefania Ferrario – model and activist

== Sciences and Health ==
- Raphael Cilento – medical practitioner and public health administrator
- Ezio Rizzardo – chemical scientist

== Business people ==
- James del Piano – immigration, shipping, real estate, timber; president of the Western Australian Italian Club (1947–1965); City of Perth councillor for ten years, including two years as Deputy Lord Mayor

== Politics ==
=== Federal politics ===
Name	Party	Chamber	Constituency	Term start	Term end	Notes
Bert Lazzarini	Labor	House	Werriwa	1919	1931	Government minister (1941–1946)
Bert Lazzarini	Labor	House	Werriwa	1934	1952	Government minister (1941–1946)
Tony Luchetti	Labor	House	Macquarie	1951	1975	
John Panizza	Liberal	Senate	Western Australia	1987	1997	
Con Sciacca	Labor	House	Bowman	1987	1996	
Con Sciacca	Labor	House	Bowman	1998	2004	
Anthony Albanese	Labor	House	Grayndler	1996	incumbent	Prime Minister (2022–present); Leader of the Opposition (2019–2022)
Phil Barresi	Liberal	House	Deakin	1996	2007	
Teresa Gambaro	Liberal	House	Petrie	1996	2007	
Teresa Gambaro	Liberal	House	Brisbane	2010	2016	
Ross Vasta	Liberal	House	Bonner	2004	2007	
Ross Vasta	Liberal	House	Bonner	2010	2025	
Concetta Fierravanti-Wells	Liberal	Senate	New South Wales	2005	2022	Government minister (2016–2018)
Cory Bernardi	Liberal	Senate	South Australia	2006	2017	
Cory Bernardi	Conservatives	Senate	South Australia	2017	2019	
Cory Bernardi	Independent	Senate	South Australia	2019	2020	
Nola Marino	Liberal	House	Forrest	2007	2025	
Tony Zappia	Labor	House	Makin	2007	incumbent	
Jane Prentice	Liberal	House	Ryan	2010	2019	
Richard Di Natale	Greens	Senate	Victoria	2011	2020	Leader of the Australian Greens (2015–2020)
Matt Canavan	National	Senate	Queensland	2014	incumbent	Government minister (2016–2020)
Daniel Mulino	Labor	House	Fraser	2019	incumbent	
Raff Ciccone	Labor	Senate	Victoria	2019	incumbent	

=== State and local politics ===
Heads of government

- David Crisafulli – Premier of Queensland (LNP) (2024–present)
- Lia Finocchiaro – Chief Minister of the Northern Territory (CLP) (2024–present)
- Morris Iemma – Premier of New South Wales (ALP) (2005–2008)
- Eva Lawler (née Bilato) – Chief Minister of the Northern Territory (TLP) (2023–2024)

Other

- Franca Arena – former NSW state politician (ALP)
- Lidia Argondizzo – Victorian state politician (ALP)
- John Barilaro – former Deputy Premier of New South Wales (National)
- Riccardo Bosi – perennial candidate, founder of Australia One Party.
- Tony Buti – Western Australian state politician (ALP)
- Raffaello Carboni – involvement in the Eureka Stockade 1854
- Carlo Carli – Victorian state politician (ALP)
- Nick Catania – WA former state politician (ALP)
- Vince Catania – WA state politician (ALP until July 2009, WA Nationals from July 2009)
- Vincenzina (Vini) Ciccarello – South Australian state politician (ALP)
- Lily D'Ambrosio – Victorian state politician (ALP)
- Angela D'Amore – Member of the New South Wales Legislative Assembly (ALP)
- John D'Orazio – WA former state politician (ALP; then independent)
- James Gobbo – former Governor of Victoria (1997–2000)
- Licia Kokocinski – former Victorian upper house politician (ALP)
- James Merlino – 27th Deputy Premier of Victoria (ALP)
- Sandra Nori – former NSW state politician (ALP)
- Paul Omodei – former Western Australian state Opposition Leader (Liberal)
- George Paciullo – former NSW politician (ALP)
- Paul Papalia – Western Australian state politician (ALP)
- John Pasquarelli – former advisor to the Australian politician and One Nation leader Pauline Hanson
- John Pesutto – Victorian state Opposition Leader (Liberal) (2022–present)
- Sam Piantadosi – former Western Australian state politician
- Rita Saffioti – Western Australian state politician (ALP)
- B. A. Santamaria – political activist and journalist
- Santo Santoro – former federal senator (Liberal)
- Frank Sartor – NSW state politician (ALP)
- Giovanni Sgro – Victorian politician (ALP)
- John Sidoti – former member of the New South Wales Legislative Assembly (LIB)
- Joe Tripodi – NSW politician (ALP)
- Tony Vallelonga – former mayor of the City of Stirling in Western Australia

== Religion ==
- Filippo Bernardini – Apostolic Delegate
- Bonaventura Cerretti – Apostolic Delegate
- Paolo Marella – Apostolic Delegate
- Giovanni Panico – Apostolic Delegate
- Anthony Randazzo – Catholic bishop
- Louisa Angelina Santospirito – Catholic laywoman, welfare worker
- Elzear Torreggiani – Catholic bishop

== Sport ==
=== Australian rules football ===
- Steven Alessio
- Mark Arceri
- Ron Barassi
- Ron Barassi Sr.
- Peter Bevilaqua
- Marcus Bontempelli
- Scott Camporeale
- Blake Caracella
- Andrew Carrazzo
- Domenic Cassisi
- Vin Catoggio
- Reece Conca
- Stephen Coniglio
- Stewart Crameri
- Frank Curcio
- Nick Dal Santo
- Brett Deledio
- Paul Dimattina
- Robert DiPierdomenico – Brownlow Medallist
- Alec Epis
- Orazio Fantasia
- Brendan Fevola
- Aaron Fiora
- Michael Firrito
- Anthony Franchina
- Daniel Giansiracusa
- Brent Guerra
- Josh Kelly
- Anthony Koutoufides
- Andrew Leoncelli
- Tom Liberatore
- Tony Liberatore – Brownlow Medallist
- Paul Licuria
- Peter Matera
- Mark Mercuri
- Joe Misiti
- Leigh Montagna
- Angelo Petraglia
- Marc Pittonet
- Simon Prestigiacomo
- Paul Puopolo
- Peter Riccardi
- Mark Ricciuto – Brownlow Medallist
- Guy Rigoni
- Michael Rischitelli
- Anthony Rocca
- Saverio Rocca
- Jack Silvagni
- Sergio Silvagni
- Stephen Silvagni – AFL Team of the Century
- Tim Taranto
- Andrew Tranquilli

=== Soccer ===
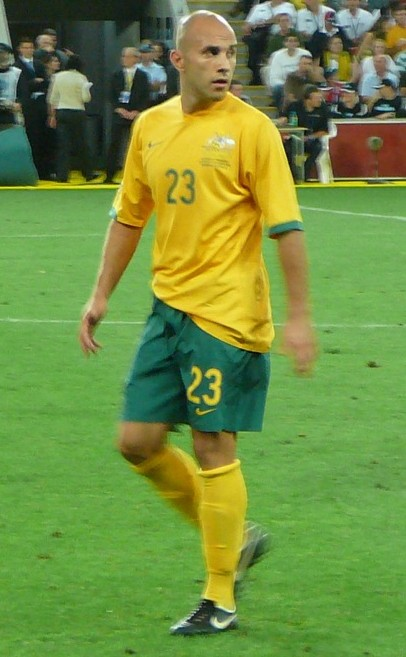
Mark Bresciano

- Paul Agostino – soccer
- John Aloisi – soccer
- Melissa Barbieri – soccer
- Daniel Beltrame – soccer
- Arno Bertogna – soccer
- Peter Bevilaqua – soccer
- Mark Birighitti – soccer
- Brandon Borrello – soccer
- Raphael Bove – soccer
- Mark Bresciano – soccer
- Joshua Brillante – soccer
- John Buonavoglia – soccer
- Joe Caletti – soccer
- Alvin Ceccoli – soccer
- Joel Chianese – soccer
- Simon Colosimo – soccer
- Steve Corica – Sydney FC
- Angelo Costanzo – Adelaide City
- Fausto De Amicis – soccer
- Lisa De Vanna – soccer
- Anthony Di Pietro – soccer Chairman of Melbourne Victory FC
- Andrew Durante – soccer
- Frank Farina – soccer
- Adam Federici – Reading England
- Matthew Foschini – soccer, Melbourne Victory
- Ben Garuccio – soccer
- Vince Grella – soccer
- Patrick Kisnorbo – soccer
- Paul Kohler – soccer
- Jacob Italiano – soccer
- Paul Izzo – soccer
- Vince Lia – Wellington Phoenix
- Massimo Luongo – footballer, Swindon Town
- Michael Marrone – soccer
- Sergio Melta – Adelaide City
- Paul Okon – Marconi
- Sebastian Pasquali – Melbourne Victory
- John Perin – Adelaide City
- Tony Pignata – soccer CEO of Sydney FC
- Hayley Raso – soccer
- Danny Tiatto – soccer
- Paul Trimboli – soccer
- James Troisi – soccer
- Carl Valeri – soccer
- Roberto Venturato – coach of A.S. Cittadella
- Aurelio Vidmar – Adelaide City
- Tony Vidmar – Adelaide city
- Max Vieri – soccer
- Robert Zabica – soccer
- Andrew Zinni – Brunswick Juventus
- Michael Zullo – soccer

=== Rugby league ===
- Tas Baitieri – Australian rugby league footballer
- Martin Bella – Australian rugby league footballer
- Terry Campese – Australian rugby league footballer
- Willie Carne – Australian rugby league footballer
- Cameron Ciraldo – Australian rugby league footballer
- Jake Clifford – Australian rugby league footballer
- Mark Corvo – Australian rugby league footballer
- Luke Davico – Australian rugby league footballer
- Paul Dezolt – Australian rugby league footballer
- Shannon Donato – Australian rugby league footballer
- Greg Florimo – Australian rugby league footballer
- Paul Franze – Australian rugby league footballer
- Craig Gower – Australian rugby league footballer
- Tony Grimaldi – Australian rugby league footballer
- Aiden Guerra – Australian rugby league footballer
- Anthony Laffranchi – Australian rugby league footballer
- Joshua Mantellato – Australian rugby league footballer
- Ciriaco Mescia – Australian rugby league footballer
- Anthony Minichiello – Australian rugby league footballer
- Mark Minichiello – Australian rugby league footballer
- Chris Nero – Australian rugby league footballer
- Shane Rigon – Australian rugby league footballer
- Grant Rovelli – Australian rugby league footballer
- Craig Salvatori – Australian rugby league footballer
- Dean Schifilliti – Australian rugby league footballer
- Kade Snowden – Australian rugby league footballer
- Laurie Spina – Australian rugby league footballer
- James Tedesco – Australian rugby league footballer
- Paul Vaughan – Australian rugby league footballer
- Nick Zisti – Australian Rugby league footballer

=== Rugby union ===
- David Campese – Australian rugby union player
- Paul Carozza – Australian rugby union player
- Matt Carraro – Australian rugby union player
- John Eales – Australian rugby union team captain (Italian-Australian mother)
- Scott Fava – Australian rugby union player
- Luke McLean – rugby union player for the Italian national team (Italian-Australian mother)
- Matt Pini – Australian rugby union player
- Julian Salvi – Australian rugby union player
- Carlo Tizzano — Australian rugby union player
- Rudi Vedelago – Australian rugby union player

=== Cricket ===
- Don Bradman
- Joe Burns
- Michael Dimattina
- Michael Di Venuto
- Phillip Hughes
- Olivia Magno
- Corey Rocchiccioli
- Sharon Millanta
- Luke Ronchi
- Joe Scuderi
- Mike Veletta
- Elyse Villani
- Adam Zampa
- Spencer Johnson
- Ben Manenti

=== Other sports ===
- Demi Bennett – professional wrestler
- Claire Bevilacqua – surfer
- Tully Bevilaqua – basketball player
- Dean Capobianco – runner
- Martin Cattalini – basketball player
- Al Costello – professional wrestler
- Casey Dellacqua – tennis player
- Matthew Dellavedova – NBA basketballer
- Tommaso D'Orsogna – swimmer
- Rocky Gattellari – boxer
- Frank Giorgi – kickboxer
- Chris Guccione – tennis player
- indi Hartwell – professional wrestler
- Rocky Mattioli – boxer
- Mario Milano – professional wrestler
- Mark Occhilupo – world surfing champion
- Vic Patrick – Victor Patrick Lucca – boxer
- Mark Philippoussis – tennis player
- Daniel Ricciardo – racing
- Massimiliano Rosolino – swimmer
- Oscar Piastri – racing
- Sam Greco – retired full contact karateka, heavyweight K-1 kickboxer, mixed martial artist
- Jack Della Maddalena – professional mixed martial artist
- Travis Bazzana – baseball player
- Mark Webber – racing
- Alan Jones – racing
