= Anthony Hudson (commentator) =

Australian sports commentator

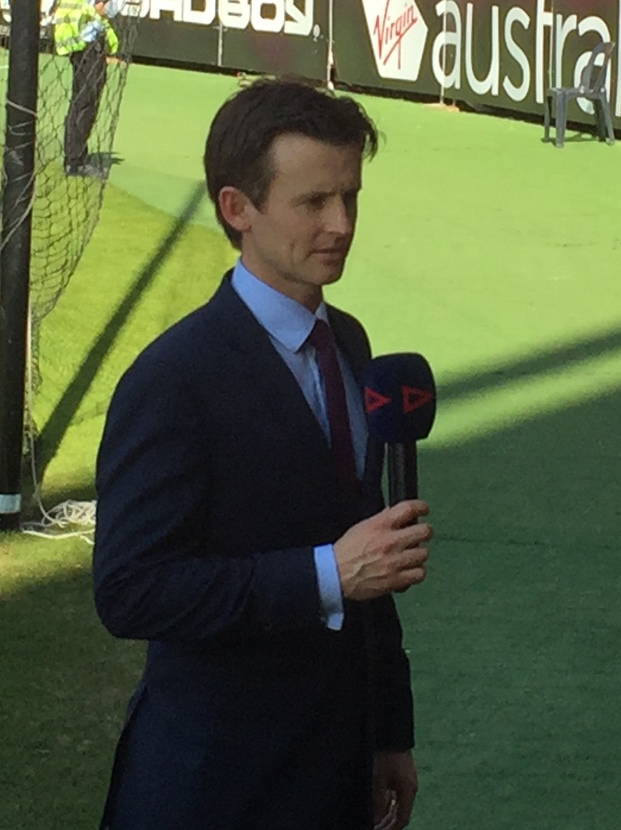
- Hudson at Sydney Showground Stadium in 2015.
- Born: 10 April 1971 (age 55)
- Other name: Huddo
- Education: RMIT University (BA)
- Occupations: Sports commentator; Journalist
- Employers: Fox Sports; 3AW
- Children: 3

Anthony "Huddo" Hudson (born 10 April 1971) is an Australian sports commentator in television and radio. He mainly commentates Australian rules football. He also writes for News Corp newspapers. Hudson has a Bachelor of Arts degree in journalism which he earned in 1993 at RMIT University.
Hudson became well known during the 1990s as a commentator for 3AW Football and subsequently the Seven Network and then Network Ten, where he cemented his name.

Hudson called the 2002, 2003, 2004, 2006, 2007, and 2011 AFL grand finals for Network Ten.

Hudson was famous for two particular calls on Network Ten:

- "I see it, but I don't believe it" (upon Sydney Swans player Nick Davis kicking a game-winning goal in the 2005 AFL semi-final).
- "Who would've thought the sequel would be just as good as the original?" (upon the West Coast Eagles winning the 2006 AFL Grand Final).

And another two on Fox Footy:

- "It's there! The miracle on grass!" (upon the Brisbane Lions coming from 52 points down to beat the Geelong Cats)
- "Thirteen! Thirteeeeeen!" (upon former Hawthorn Hawks player Lance Franklin kicking his thirteenth goal in a 2012 AFL home and away game against North Melbourne Kangaroos)

== Career ==
Hudson began his media career in Bendigo, Victoria, on Bendigo radio station 3CCC. In 1989, he graduated high school and moved to Melbourne. where he studied journalism at RMIT University. In 1991, he began his career with 3AW as a news journalist, and eventually progressed to calling the 1996 AFL Grand Final.

In the late 1990s, he was a football and tennis commentator for the Seven Network, but when Network Ten won the AFL broadcast rights in 2001, he made the move to Ten. Hudson went on to call five grand finals for Ten. At Ten, Hudson expanded his role to football-based entertainment shows. He hosted After The Game, which later became Before The Game, from 2002 until 2005, when he decided to leave the show to concentrate on his commentary for Ten and afternoon radio show on Melbourne's 1116 SEN. In 2011 Hudson hosted One HD's Thursday-night AFL show, The Game Plan.

In 2012, with Ten no longer holding the rights to the AFL, Hudson moved to Fox Footy, where he calls Saturday and Sunday matches and also appears in on First Crack and a podcast called The SuperFooty Podcast. He called for SEN on a Friday night until 2022.

As an avid supporter of Geelong, Hudson hosts many of the club's functions, including season launches, family days, and club nights.

As of 2023, he commentates games of the BBL for Fox Cricket. He also returned to 3AW that year.

Hudson also is a part of the Big Ant Studios video game AFL 23, being a commentator alongside Jason Bennett, Kelli Underwood, Garry Lyon, and Daniel Harford.

As of 2025, in addition to Saturday and Sunday games, Hudson will also commentate Friday night games for Fox Footy, with the network gaining to the rights to produce its own commentary for every game. This means he no longer calls Friday games for 3AW as he did the previous two season; he now calls Thursday night games for the station.

== Personal life ==
Hudson is married to Eloise and has three children.
