= Dale Morris =

Australian rules footballer (born 1982)

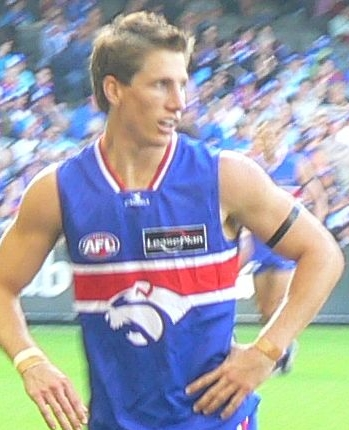
- Morris playing for the Western Bulldogs in June 2007

Personal information
- Full name: Dale Morris
- Born: 29 December 1982 (age 43)
- Original team: Doutta Stars (Vic)/Werribee (VFL)
- Draft: No. 19, 2005 rookie draft
- Height: 190 cm (6 ft 3 in)
- Weight: 93 kg (205 lb)
- Position: Key defender

Playing career^{1}
Years	Club	Games (Goals)
2005–2019	Western Bulldogs	253 (3)

International team honours^{2}
Years	Team	Games (Goals)
2005	Australia	2
- ^{1} Playing statistics correct to the end of 2019.^{2} Representative statistics correct as of 2005.

Career highlights
- AFL premiership player (2016); All-Australian team (2008); Western Bulldogs Hall of Fame (2023)

Dale Morris (born 29 December 1982) is a former Australian rules footballer who played for the Western Bulldogs in the Australian Football League (AFL).

Morris spent four years playing for Werribee Football Club in the Victorian Football League before being added to the Bulldogs' rookie list in the 2004 Rookie Draft. He quickly cemented his place in the Western Bulldogs' lineup, impressing many with his pace and consistency as a defender, and finished with 17 games for season 2005. He was elevated to the senior list at the end of 2005.

Morris was selected in the back pocket of the 2008 All-Australian team.

Morris played in guernsey number 38 for the duration of his career.

In Round 21, 2011, against the Essendon Bombers, Morris suffered a broken tibia in his lower right leg which prematurely ended his season. Morris returned to play one quarter in a Development Match game in Round 6, 2012, but suffered a stress fracture in the same leg which he broke in horrific circumstances in 2011. The injury sidelined Morris for the rest of the season.

Morris made his return to AFL in Round 1, 2013. In what was overall a successful campaign for Morris, he provided defensive solidity to the Bulldogs' backline, and also managed to play all 22 games for the season.

In 2016, Morris was a part of the Western Bulldogs premiership team that ended their long-standing premiership drought of 62 years. With over five minutes to go in the match, Morris laid a game-turning tackle on Sydney Swans forward Lance Franklin, which set up Tom Boyd to kick a goal that gave the Bulldogs a 15-point lead. After the game, it was revealed that Morris had played the entire finals series with a fractured vertebrae.

Morris is known for his quick recovery from injury. He suffered a partial tear in his ACL in 2018 yet came back to play the back-end of the 2018 season. In 2019, he suffered another ACL, and was out of action until Round 19, where he rupture his ACL for the third time in 18 months. Prior to the 2019 final series, Morris announced his retirement after 253 games.

== Statistics ==
Legend
G	Goals	K	Kicks	D	Disposals	T	Tackles
B	Behinds	H	Handballs	M	Marks
#	Played in that season's premiership team

Season	Team	No.	Games	Totals							Averages (per game)						
Season	Team	No.	Games	G	B	K	H	D	M	T	G	B	K	H	D	M	T
2005	Western Bulldogs	38	17	0	1	56	107	163	48	43	0.0	0.1	3.3	6.3	9.6	2.8	2.5
2006	Western Bulldogs	38	24	1	3	127	170	297	104	56	0.0	0.1	5.3	7.1	12.4	4.3	2.3
2007	Western Bulldogs	38	21	0	1	135	126	261	101	56	0.0	0.0	6.4	6.0	12.4	4.8	2.7
2008	Western Bulldogs	38	25	0	0	156	170	326	120	73	0.0	0.0	6.2	6.8	13.0	4.8	2.9
2009	Western Bulldogs	38	25	1	2	115	187	302	123	59	0.0	0.1	4.6	7.5	12.1	4.9	2.4
2010	Western Bulldogs	38	21	0	1	111	141	252	73	62	0.0	0.0	5.3	6.7	12.0	3.5	3.0
2011	Western Bulldogs	38	18	1	0	127	100	227	80	70	0.1	0.0	7.1	5.6	12.6	4.4	3.9
2012	Western Bulldogs	38	0	—	—	—	—	—	—	—	—	—	—	—	—	—	—
2013	Western Bulldogs	38	22	0	0	122	133	255	83	51	0.0	0.0	5.5	6.0	11.6	3.8	2.3
2014	Western Bulldogs	38	20	0	0	119	108	227	82	47	0.0	0.0	6.0	5.4	11.4	4.1	2.4
2015	Western Bulldogs	38	14	0	0	70	85	155	69	35	0.0	0.0	5.0	6.1	11.1	4.9	2.5
2016^{#}	Western Bulldogs	38	23	0	2	129	178	307	104	54	0.0	0.1	5.6	7.7	13.3	4.5	2.3
2017	Western Bulldogs	38	11	0	0	38	74	112	34	24	0.0	0.0	3.4	6.7	10.2	3.1	2.2
2018	Western Bulldogs	38	11	0	1	49	70	119	39	23	0.0	0.1	4.5	6.4	10.8	3.5	2.1
2019	Western Bulldogs	38	1	0	0	3	3	6	2	0	0.0	0.0	3.0	3.0	6.0	2.0	0.0
Career			253	3	11	1357	1652	3009	1062	653	0.0	0.0	5.4	6.5	11.9	4.2	2.6

== Honours and achievements ==
- Team
  - AFL premiership: 2016
  - Pre-season premiership player: 2010
- Individual
  - Doug Hawkins Medal: 2016
  - John Van Groningen Domestique Award: 2016
  - All-Australian: 2008
