= Invertigo =

Australian musical group

- Also known as: Vertigo
- Origin: Melbourne, Victoria, Australia
- Genres: Pop rock; power pop
- Years active: 1996–1999; 2000–2003; 2008
- Labels: Gotham/BMG; Standard; Atlantic
- Spinoff of: Pseudo Echo
- Past members: James Leigh; Gerry Leigh; Vincent Leigh; Hugh Wilson; Christian Argenti

Invertigo were an Australian four-piece pop rock group active in the early 2000s. They originally formed as Vertigo in 1996, by the three Leigh brothers: Jerry (born 10 May 1961) on guitar, James (born 1 December 1967) on keyboards and Vince (born 19 November 1964) on drums (the latter two are former members of Pseudo Echo); together with Hugh Wilson on lead vocals. They had a top 40 hit on the ARIA Singles Chart with "Forever Lately" and released an album before disbanding in 1999. The Leigh brothers formed Invertigo in 2000 with Christian Argenti (born 3 January 1975) on lead vocals. Their highest charting single, "Chances Are...", reached No. 19 and their sole album, Forum, peaked at No. 11. That group broke up in 2003.

== Career ==
=== 1996–1999: Early incarnation (as Vertigo) ===
Invertigo were originally formed as Vertigo in 1996 in Melbourne, by the three Leigh brothers: Jerry (born Jerome William Dingli, 10 May 1961) on guitar, James (born James Joseph Dingli, 1 December 1967) on keyboards and Vince (born Vincent Paul Dingli, 19 November 1964) on drums; together with Hugh Wilson on lead vocals. James had joined Pseudo Echo in October 1984 on keyboards and Vince (ex-Marginal Era) followed in November 1985 on drums. After that group split in 1989 the Leigh brothers wrote material together and performed in various cover bands.

Vertigo released a single, "Forever Lately", in June 1997 via Gotham/BMG, which peaked at No. 38 on the ARIA Singles Chart. They followed with another single, "Human Need", in November which reached the top 100. The group recorded an album: mixed by Chris Lord-Alge. According to Australian music journalist, Ed Nimmervoll, the Leigh brothers "started falling out with their singer around the time of releasing ['Human Need']. Losing their singer also meant losing their record contract with Gotham." Following the departure of Wilson in 1999, Vertigo disbanded.

=== 2000–2003: Forum (as Invertigo) ===
The three Leigh brothers advertised for a vocalist: Christian Argenti was the successful applicant; the four-piece formed Invertigo in 2000 in Melbourne. In June of that year their debut single, "Desensitized", reached the top 30. It was performed on the TV variety show, Russell Gilbert Live. A sample of "Desensitized" was featured on the Osmosis Jones Sampler CD. In December they issued their next single, "Chances Are", which became their highest charting when it peaked at No. 19. A third single, "Say You Do", appeared in the top 40 in June 2001.

Invertigo's debut album, Forum, was released on 9 July 2001, which reached No. 11 on the ARIA Albums Chart. Brendan Swift of AllMusic felt it was "a catchy debut that shows signs of promise, but lacks the overall depth required for repeat listens... [with a] mix of slick, catchy, predigested tunes, sung by four good-looking guys." Blender's J. D. Considine opined that the group were "offering soft-hearted, woolen-headed love songs outfitted with blaring guitars and a muscular, insistent beat. But [their] aesthetic is so unapologetically pop all jangly guitars, orchestral synths and tight, he-man vocal harmonies that the extra volume adds no edge at all." Christian Argenti left the band in February 2003 and the group disbanded later that year.

=== 2003–present: Post-split ===
Hugh Wilson has worked as a session vocalist, including on jingles for TV ads: "Turn Me on TEN" for Channel Ten's station identification and "I Want My Foxtel" for that network's promotion. The Leigh brothers have been members of various cover bands. James toured with the Idols of the 80s band in 2005, which included former members of Pseudo Echo, 1927, Boom Crash Opera, Kids in the Kitchen, and Uncanny X-Men.

Christian Argenti also worked as a guest vocalist and was later a radio announcer. In March 2009 he started hosting a Melbourne sports radio station, SEN's midnight to dawn program, All Night Appetite. From February 2010 Argenti was the presenter of Talking Back the Night on 92.5 Gold FM in the Gold Coast.

== Discography ==
=== Studio albums ===
Studio album, with selected details and chart position
Title	Details	Peak chart positions
Title	Details	AUS
Forum	Released: 9 July 2001; Label: Standard (STD1202); Format: CD	11

=== Singles ===
List of singles, with selected chart positions
Title	Year	Peak chart positions
Title	Year	AUS
"Forever Lately" (as Vertigo)	1997	38
"Human Need" (as Vertigo)	1997	97
"Desensitized"	2000	29
"Chances Are"	2000	19
"Say You Do"	2001	31

== Awards and nominations ==
=== ARIA Music Awards ===
The ARIA Music Awards are a set of annual ceremonies presented by Australian Recording Industry Association (ARIA), which recognise excellence, innovation, and achievement across all genres of the music of Australia. They commenced in 1987.

Year	Nominee / work	Award	Result	Ref.
2001	"Chances Are"	Best Pop Release	Nominated	
2001	Mark Hartley for "Chances Are"	Best Video	Nominated	

=== APRA Awards ===
The APRA Awards are held in Australia and New Zealand by the Australasian Performing Right Association to recognise songwriting skills, sales and airplay performance by its members annually.

Year	Nominee / work	Award	Result
2001	"Desensitized"	Most Performed Australian Work	Nominated
2002	"Say You Do"	Most Performed Australian Work	Nominated
