= The Good Oil =

Australian radio program

The Good Oil is a radio program on SEN 1116 in Melbourne, Australia. It airs between noon-4 pm five days a week and is hosted by Mark Doran. As an afternoon program, it seeks to provide fresh angles on the day's news stories.

The Good Oil is so named as it provides information on a wide variety of news in the world of sport.

== Host ==
Mark Doran is a journalist/commentator who has called the AFL Grand Final and has witnessed numerous Olympic Games. He was a former boundary rider on both channel 7 and Fox Footy. The show is currently produced by Kerry Lambert.

== Regular guests ==
- Rodney Hogg: "Hoggy"
- Peter Brukner: Australian Athletics Selector and Olympic historian.
- Carlos Alberto Diego: A wrap-up of the world game news of the week.
- Sharelle McMahon: Melbourne Vixens and Australian team captain Sharelle McMahon
- Mark Robinson: One of the Herald Sun's journalists joins Mark to recap and discuss stories from the world of the AFL.
- Footballers Brad Green, Sam Mitchell, Brent Harvey and Scott Burns are footballers that join Mark for the Huddle on a Wednesday.
- Daniel Harford and "Rippa Rita" join Mark on Fridays between noon-2 for Casual Friday.

== Notable segments ==
- On Thursday between 1-2 Mark is joined in the studio by a special guest on "Feature Thursday" where there is an hour interview regarding this sporting personalities life or a sports life. Some of the guest on Feature Thursday so far have been Jim Stynes, Heather McKay, Michael Long, Michelle Timms, One Day International Cricket, Sarah Fitz-Gerald and Drew Ginn, Peter Thomson, Michael Klim, Brett Hawke, Mark French, John Steffenson and Jana Pittman just to name a few.
