= 2008 All-Australian team =

The 2008 All-Australian team represents the best performed Australian Football League (AFL) players during the 2008 season. The selection panel provided the 40 leading players of the year in their playing positions at the conclusion of the home and away season before announcing the final 22 during the All-Australian Presentation Dinner on 15 September. The team is honorary and does not play any games.

== Selection panel ==
The selection panel for the 2008 All-Australian team consisted of non-voting chairman Andrew Demetriou, Adrian Anderson, Robert Walls, Gerard Healy, Mark Bickley, Glen Jakovich, Rod Austin and Kevin Bartlett.

== Team ==
=== Initial squad ===
The 40-man squad was announced on 3 September, with ten Geelong players named.

2008 All-Australian squad
Defenders
Nathan Bock (Adelaide)	Corey Enright (Geelong)	Luke Hodge (Hawthorn)	Tom Harley (Geelong)
Samuel Fisher (St Kilda)	Max Hudghton (St Kilda)	Andrew Mackie (Geelong)	Luke McPharlin (Fremantle)
Dale Morris (Western Bulldogs)	Daniel Pratt (North Melbourne)	Darren Milburn (Geelong)	Matthew Scarlett (Geelong)
Midfielders/Ruckmen
Gary Ablett Jr. (Geelong)	Jimmy Bartel (Geelong)	Joel Corey (Geelong)	Adam Cooney (Western Bulldogs)
Brett Deledio (Richmond)	Dean Cox (West Coast)	Brett Kirk (Sydney)	Matthew Richardson (Richmond)
Chris Judd (Carlton)	Lenny Hayes (St Kilda)	Daniel Cross (Western Bulldogs)	Aaron Sandilands (Fremantle)
Simon Black (Brisbane Lions)	Joel Selwood (Geelong)	Drew Petrie (North Melbourne)	Sam Mitchell (Hawthorn)
Forwards
Jonathan Brown (Brisbane Lions)	Daniel Motlop (Port Adelaide)	Lance Franklin (Hawthorn)	Brent Harvey (North Melbourne)
Robert Murphy (Western Bulldogs)	Steve Johnson (Geelong)	Brendan Fevola (Carlton)	Daniel Bradshaw (Brisbane Lions)
Paul Medhurst (Collingwood)	Matthew Pavlich (Fremantle)	Ryan O'Keefe (Sydney)	Nick Riewoldt (St Kilda)

=== Final team ===
2008 All-Australian team
B:	Dale Morris (Western Bulldogs)	Matthew Scarlett (Geelong)	Tom Harley (Geelong) (vice-captain)
HB:	Luke Hodge (Hawthorn)	Nathan Bock (Adelaide)	Samuel Fisher (St Kilda)
C:	Jimmy Bartel (Geelong)	Joel Corey (Geelong)	Adam Cooney (Western Bulldogs)
HF:	Steve Johnson (Geelong)	Nick Riewoldt (St Kilda)	Brent Harvey (North Melbourne)
F:	Brendan Fevola (Carlton)	Lance Franklin (Hawthorn)	Paul Medhurst (Collingwood)
Foll:	Dean Cox (West Coast)	Chris Judd (Carlton) (captain)	Gary Ablett Jr. (Geelong)
Int:	Corey Enright (Geelong)	Matthew Pavlich (Fremantle)	Aaron Sandilands (Fremantle)
Int:	Matthew Richardson (Richmond)		
Coach:	Alastair Clarkson (Hawthorn)		

Note: the position of coach in the All-Australian team is traditionally awarded to the coach of the premiership team.

The 2008 All-Australian umpire was also awarded, with that honour going to Brett Rosebury.
