= 2005 AFL Rising Star =

Australian rules football award

2005 NAB AFL Rising Star
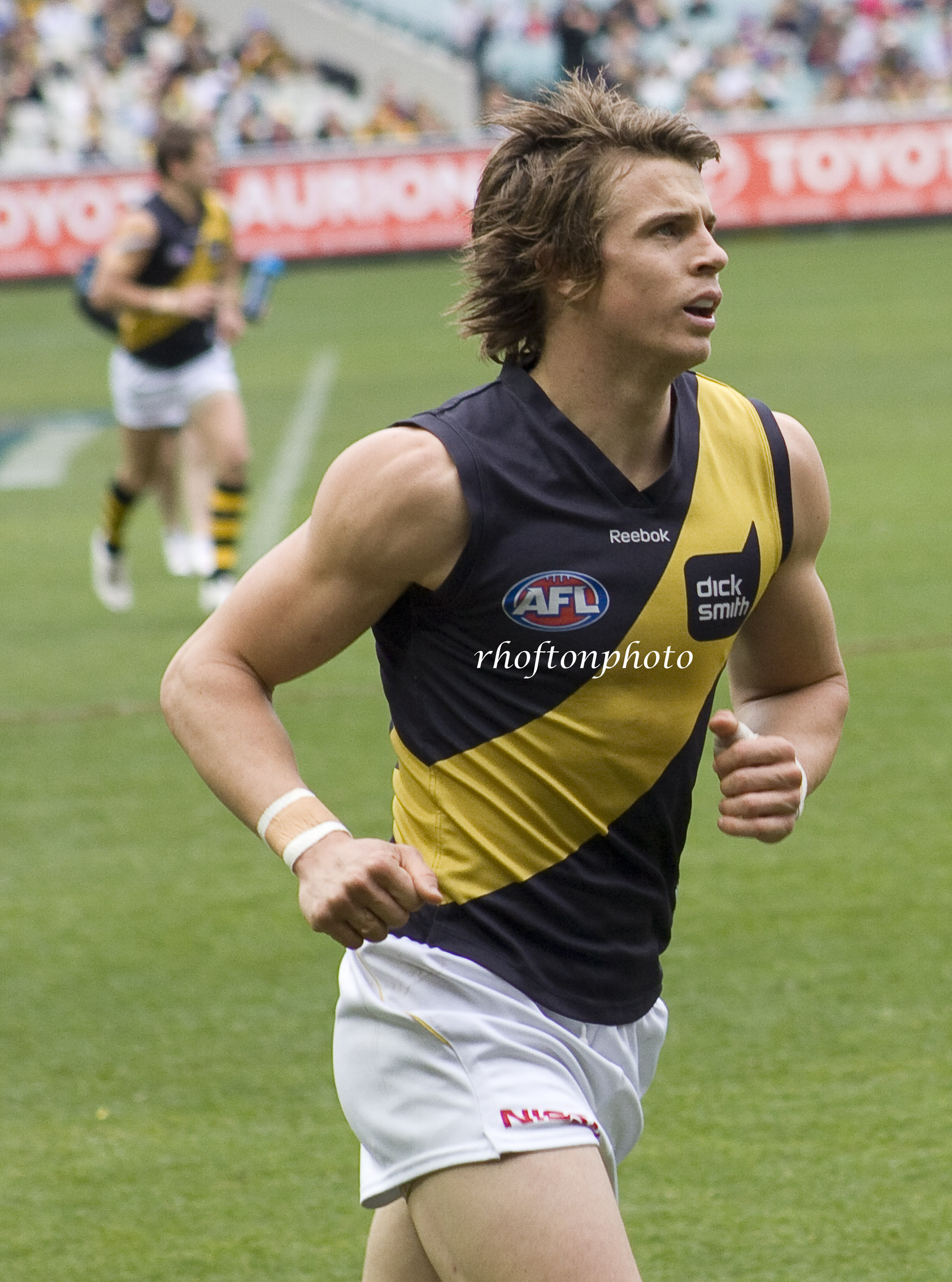
- Brett Deledio, winner of the 2005 AFL Rising Star award, during the 2009 AFL season
- Sponsored by: National Australia Bank
- Country: Australia
- Rising Star: Brett Deledio (Richmond)

The NAB AFL Rising Star award is given annually to a stand out young player in the Australian Football League. The 2005 medal was won by Richmond player Brett Deledio.

== Eligibility ==
Every round, an Australian Football League rising star nomination is given to a stand out young player. To be eligible for the award, a player must be under 21 on 1 January of that year, have played 10 or fewer senior games and not been suspended during the season. At the end of the year, one of the 22 nominees is the winner of award.

== Nominations ==
Round	Player	Club	Ref.
1	Kepler Bradley	Essendon	
2	Shannon Byrnes	Geelong	
3	Brock McLean	Melbourne	
4	Lance Franklin	Hawthorn	
5	Jason Laycock	Essendon	
6	Justin Sherman	Brisbane Lions	
7	Will Minson	Western Bulldogs	
8	Brett Deledio	Richmond	
9	Colin Sylvia	Melbourne	
10	Travis Cloke	Collingwood	
11	Jordan Lewis	Hawthorn	
12	Jed Adcock	Brisbane Lions	
13	Ryan Griffen	Western Bulldogs	
14	David Mundy	Fremantle	
15	Troy Selwood	Brisbane Lions	
16	Adam Selwood	West Coast	
17	Anthony Corrie	Brisbane Lions	
18	Kade Simpson	Carlton	
19	Jarryd Roughead	Hawthorn	
20	Adam Bentick	Carlton	
21	Nathan Ablett	Geelong	
22	Raphael Clarke	St Kilda	

== Final voting ==
	Player	Club	Votes
1	Brett Deledio	Richmond	43
2	Ryan Griffen	Western Bulldogs	34
3	David Mundy	Fremantle	19
4	Brock McLean	Melbourne	15
5	Jed Adcock	Brisbane Lions	14
6	Jordan Lewis	Hawthorn	3
7	Adam Selwood	West Coast	2
7	Justin Sherman	Brisbane Lions	2
9	Kepler Bradley	Essendon	1
9	Lance Franklin	Hawthorn	1
9	Will Minson	Western Bulldogs	1
Source: AFL Record Season Guide 2015
