= 1116 SEN =

Sports radio station in Melbourne, Victoria

1116 SEN (3AK)
- Melbourne, Victoria; Australia
- Broadcast area: Melbourne RA1
- Frequencies: AM: 1116 kHz; DAB+: 9A Melbourne

Programming
- Language: English
- Format: Sports radio

Ownership
- Owner: Sports Entertainment Network; (Victorian Radio Network Pty Ltd)
- Sister stations: SEN Track

History
- Founded: 29 November 1931 as 3AK
- First air date: 19 January 2004
- Call sign meaning: Founder Akron Tyre Co

Technical information
- Licensing authority: Australian Communications & Media Authority
- Power: 5,000 watts
- Transmitter coordinates: 37°44′41.3″S 145°6′37.3″E

Links
- Webcast: Listen live
- Website: www.sen.com.au

1116 SEN (call sign 3AK) is an Australian radio station in Victoria, Australia. Owned and operated by Sports Entertainment Group, it broadcasts a sports radio format. It commenced broadcasting on 29 November 1931 as 3AK, the station currently broadcasts from studios in South Melbourne.

== History ==
The station first broadcast on 29 November 1931 as 3AK. In October 2003, amid growing debt and struggling ratings, 3AK operators Data & Commerce Limited placed the station up for sale. In November, owners Data & Commerce Limited entered into a lease with the newly formed Sports Entertainment Network to create SEN 1116, a 24-hour sports radio station. Headed by managing director Danny Staffieri, formerly of FIVEaa, the new station was promoted as 'entertaining radio with a sports focus', and would rival horse racing station Sport 927.

On 19 January 2004, SEN 1116 launched onto Melbourne's airwaves, with former AFL footballers Garry Lyon, Tim Watson and Billy Brownless heading the station's "Morning Glory" breakfast show, Richmond Football Club premiership player Kevin Bartlett in mornings, Radio National's Francis Leach in afternoons, and Dermott Brereton and Anthony Hudson in drive. In the year's first radio ratings survey, the station jumped from reaching 1.2% of the Melbourne radio market as 3AK, to 2.1% as SEN, growing to 2.8% in the year's fourth survey despite the lack of coverage of any major sports. However, in July, the station secured broadcast rights to the 2004 Summer Olympics, alongside 2GB, 2CC, FIVEaa, 6IX, HO-FM and Hot 100, among others. SEN also carried coverage of the 2004 NRL Grand Final from 2GB, and the 2004–05 FA Premier League from BBC Radio 5 Live.

In December 2004, the SEN brand was revealed to be expanded into Adelaide, with Sports Entertainment Network leasing news talk 5DN from Australian Radio Network to create SEN 1323. Launching on 1 February 2005, the station became a simulcast of its Melbourne sister station, with only one Adelaide-based programme – "The Boys Next Door", hosted by former FIVEaa presenter Mark Aiston, The Sunday Footy Show panelist Mark Bickley and Port Adelaide Football Club ruckman Matthew Primus. However, while the station remained flat in Melbourne, ratings dwindled in Adelaide; despite gaining coverage of the New Zealand cricket tour of Australia and the 2005 VFL season, Sports Entertainment Network entered voluntary administration, citing $3.5 million in losses. The SEN 1323 lease was cancelled, resulting in ARN launching easy listening-format Cruise 1323. The Melbourne station was sold back to Pacific Star Network, the renamed Data & Commerce Limited.

=== 2010s ===
In July 2015, the newsroom shared between SEN and sister station 3MP was closed, replaced with the Victorian news service from Macquarie National News, based at 3AW.

In November 2015, it was announced that Francis Leach would depart ABC Grandstand Digital following the axing of the Grandstand Breakfast programme, and rejoin SEN, hosting SEN Breakfast alongside David Schwarz to replace The Morning Glory. Co-host Andrew Maher moved to afternoons, launching SEN Lunch Break, moving Daniel Harford into drive with Mark Allen. Andrew Gaze and Tim Watson, while losing regular timeslots, would remain with the station as a contributor.

In January 2018, the station's schedule was again refreshed. Former ABC commentator Gerard Whateley joined the station as chief sports caller and mornings presenter, with Kevin Bartlett moving to the drive show following the departure of Harford. In April 2018, parent company Pacific Star Network merged with sports media business Crocmedia, most notable for producing the AFL Nation broadcast call heard across regional Australia.

On 3 July 2019, Pacific Star Network announced its subsidiary Crocmedia had acquired 23 Australian broadcasting licences from Gumnut Nominees, the licensee of Italian language radio network Rete Italia, at the value of A$6.25 million, including Sydney, Brisbane, Perth, Gold Coast, Darwin and Alice Springs.

== Notable announcers ==
=== Current announcers ===
- Mark Bickley
- Dermott Brereton
- Nathan Buckley
- Kane Cornes
- Kym Dillon
- Sam Edmund
- Mark Fine
- Andrew Gaze
- Tim Gossage
- Ben Graham
- David King
- Cam Luke
- Garry Lyon
- Andrew Maher
- Cameron Mooney
- Tom Morris
- Liam Pickering
- Michelangelo Rucci
- Dwayne Russell
- Peter Vlahos
- Tim Watson
- Gerard Whateley

=== Former announcers ===
- Mark Aiston
- Mark Allen
- Dan Clark - MLB Writer
- Christian Argenti
- Kevin Bartlett
- Darren Berry
- Billy Brownless
- Edwin Cowlishaw
- Mark Doran
- Bruce Eva
- Tristan Foenander
- Matthew Hardy
- Daniel Harford
- Andrew Hayes
- Jack Heverin
- Anthony Hudson
- Francis Leach
- Bryan Martin
- Sam McClure
- Hamish McLachlan
- Darren Parkin
- Matthew Primus
- Jason Richardson
- John Rothfield
- Tony Schibeci
- David Schwarz
- Brad Spicer
- Terry Wallace

== Sports coverage ==
SEN has exclusive and non-exclusive rights to various sports in Australia:

Australian rules football

- Australian Football League
- Victorian Football League

Basketball

- National Basketball League

Cricket

- Australian cricket team in the United Arab Emirates in 2018–19
- Big Bash League
- Indian cricket team in Australia in 2018–19
- 2019 Cricket World Cup

Football

- A-League

Golf

- Australian Open
- U.S. Masters Tournament

Horse racing

- Spring Racing Carnival
- Melbourne Cup
- Zipping Classic

Rugby League

- State of Origin

Rugby Union

- Super Rugby

Tennis

- Australian Open

== Related stations ==
=== SEN SA ===
SEN SA
- Adelaide; Australia
- Broadcast area: Adelaide, South Australia
- Frequency: 1629 kHz
- Branding: SEN SA

Programming
- Language: English
- Format: Sports radio

History
- First air date: 6 December 2018

Technical information
- Power: 400 watts
- Transmitter coordinates: 34°51′43″S 138°34′10″E
- Repeater: 1629 kHz AM Mount Gambier

On 13 October 2018, SEN parent company Pacific Star Network confirmed it had purchased an AM narrowband licence in Adelaide, South Australia, returning the SEN brand to South Australia. The station launched on 1629 AM on 6 December 2018, with local presenters Kane Cornes, Andrew Hayes, Kym Dillon and Michelangelo Rucci. Other programs, including Gerard Whateley's morning show and live sports coverage, will be syndicated live from the Melbourne station.

On 9 September 2019, SEN SA Breakfast commenced simulcasting on RadioTAB's 1539AM Adelaide frequency. On 2 December, a second South Australian frequency was launched – also on 1629 AM – covering Mount Gambier.

=== SEN Track ===
SEN Track is a radio network broadcasting coverage of horse, thoroughbred and greyhound racing, which launched on 28 March 2020.

=== 1170 SEN ===
1170 SEN (2CH)
- Sydney; Australia
- Broadcast area: Sydney, New South Wales
- Frequency: 1170 kHz
- Branding: 1170 SEN

Programming
- Language: English
- Format: Sports radio

History
- First air date: 22 October 2020
- Former call signs: 2CH
- Call sign meaning: Churches

Technical information
- Power: 5000 watts
- Transmitter coordinates: 34°51′43″S 138°34′10″E

1170 SEN (official callsign 2CH) is a sports radio station in Sydney, New South Wales.

=== SEN Top End ===
On 17 October 2021 SEN Top End launched on 1611 AM Narrowcast broadcasting coverage of the Northern Territory Football League, horse, thoroughbred and greyhound racing.

=== SEN Hobart ===
On 7 July 2021 SEN Hobart launched on 1629 AM Narrowcast providing coverage of several local and national sports such as Cricket, AFL, horse, thoroughbred and greyhound racing. There are live programs from Hobart on Friday, Saturday and Monday mornings.

=== SEN Gold Coast ===
On the 3rd March 2021 SEN Gold Coast launched on 1620 AM Narrowcast providing coverage of several local and national sports such as Cricket, AFL, horse, thoroughbred and greyhound racing.

== Former stations ==
=== SEN 1323 ===
SEN 1323 was launched on 1 February 2005 in Adelaide, replacing 5DN. It largely simulcast 1116 SEN, with a single opt-out program for the Adelaide market. The station closed following parent company Data & Commerce Limited entering voluntary administration in June 2005.

=== SEN+ ===
SEN+ commenced broadcasting on 13 August 2018, replacing Classic Rock Radio. The station broadcast live coverage of the NFL, NBA, A-League and Super Rugby as well as live and timeshifted programming from the main SEN station.

On 28 March 2020, it was replaced by SEN Track and has since been purchased by ACE Radio Broadcasters to relaunch as 3MP.

== Notable programs ==
- The Good Oil

=== Former ===
- No Man Should Ever Walk Alone, a Monday night hour-long show hosted by Danny Frawley on men's health, including mental health (a cause he championed after opening up about his own struggles), addiction and lifestyle. Frawley hosted the show until his death in 2019.

=== Podcasts ===
The station also has produced some podcasts, including:

- Tiger Tragics, a Richmond-centric podcast hosted by SEN fill-in and weekend host and MCG public address announcer Tony Schibeci and SEN producer's Mitchell Scott and Karl Bianco.
- The Carlton Show, a Carlton-centric podcast co-hosted by Maher.
- The Geelong Show, a Geelong-centric podcast co-hosted by Ben Casanelia of Inside Football, SEN's AFL magazine.
- SEN America, covering American sports leagues such as the NBA.

== Controversy ==
In February 2025, SEN sacked cricket journalist Peter Lalor for his social media posts about the Gaza genocide, with CEO Craig Hutchinson claiming that his posts "made Jewish people in Melbourne feel unsafe".
