= Will Minson =

Australian rules footballer (born 1985)

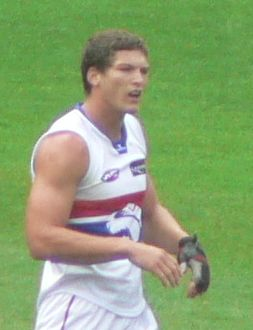
- Minson in 2008

Personal information
- Full name: William Gerald Minson
- Born: 11 April 1985 (age 41)
- Original team: Norwood (SANFL)
- Draft: No. 20, 2002 National Draft, Western Bulldogs
- Height: 199 cm (6 ft 6 in)
- Weight: 106 kg (234 lb)
- Position: Ruckman

Playing career^{1}
Years	Club	Games (Goals)
2004–2016	Western Bulldogs	191 (81)
- ^{1} Playing statistics correct to the end of 2016.

Career highlights
- VFL premiership player: 2016; 2005 AFL Rising Star nominee; All-Australian team 2013

William Gerald Minson (born 11 April 1985) is a former professional Australian rules footballer who played for the Western Bulldogs in the Australian Football League (AFL).

== Early life ==
Minson grew up in Norwood, South Australia and played football with the Norwood Football Club up until the under 18's.

He was a student at St Peter's College, Adelaide, where he played the majority of his junior football, while also playing as a junior footballer at Walkerville FC.

== AFL career ==
The Western Bulldogs recruited Minson in the 2002 AFL draft at pick number 20. He made his debut with the club in 2004.

He was known for his physical presence, being suspended for striking Geelong star Cameron Ling in just his second game.

Minson went on to play 191 games for the Bulldogs having a standout season in 2013 when he led the league for hit outs and made the All Australian team.

In October 2016, Minson announced he would no longer be playing for the Western Bulldogs and he would explore his options during the free-agency period. After failing to find a new club during the free-agency period, he was subsequently delisted by the Western Bulldogs.

== Statistics ==
Legend
G	Goals	K	Kicks	D	Disposals	T	Tackles
B	Behinds	H	Handballs	M	Marks	H/O	Hit-outs

Led the league for the season only
Led the league after season and finals

Season	Team	No.	Games	Totals								Averages (per game)							
Season	Team	No.	Games	G	B	K	H	D	M	T	H/O	G	B	K	H	D	M	T	H/O
2004	Western Bulldogs	27	5	1	1	10	7	17	4	4	37	0.2	0.2	2.0	1.4	3.4	0.8	0.8	7.4
2005	Western Bulldogs	27	17	4	4	86	64	150	33	52	207	0.2	0.2	5.1	3.8	8.8	8.8	1.9	12.2
2006	Western Bulldogs	27	13	8	4	58	46	104	25	24	131	0.6	0.3	4.5	3.5	8.0	1.9	1.8	10.1
2007	Western Bulldogs	27	6	0	1	26	22	48	8	13	73	0.0	0.2	4.3	3.7	8.0	1.3	2.2	12.2
2008	Western Bulldogs	27	25	19	11	175	91	266	88	58	313	0.8	0.4	7.0	3.6	10.6	3.5	2.3	12.5
2009	Western Bulldogs	27	25	16	4	143	165	308	89	70	365	0.6	0.2	5.7	6.6	12.3	3.6	2.8	14.6
2010	Western Bulldogs	27	15	8	7	88	75	163	48	32	197	0.5	0.5	5.9	5.0	10.9	3.2	2.1	13.1
2011	Western Bulldogs	27	9	6	2	62	49	111	32	23	167	0.7	0.2	6.9	5.4	12.3	3.6	2.6	18.6
2012	Western Bulldogs	27	21	4	6	138	154	292	57	67	667	0.2	0.3	6.6	7.3	13.9	2.7	3.2	31.8
2013	Western Bulldogs	27	22	7	5	152	168	320	40	81	860	0.3	0.2	6.9	7.6	14.5	1.8	3.7	39.1
2014	Western Bulldogs	27	21	4	6	144	108	252	33	81	757	0.2	0.3	6.9	5.1	12.0	1.6	3.9	36.0
2015	Western Bulldogs	27	10	3	3	62	40	102	17	41	265	0.3	0.3	6.2	4.0	10.2	1.7	4.1	26.5
2016	Western Bulldogs	27	2	1	0	9	5	14	1	6	32	0.5	0.0	4.5	2.5	7.0	0.5	3.0	16.0
Career			191	81	54	1153	994	2147	475	552	4071	0.4	0.3	6.0	5.2	11.2	2.5	2.9	21.3

== Personal life ==
Minson has a younger brother, Hugh, who formerly played in the Australian Football League with Port Adelaide before being forced to retire through injury. He also has another brother, Rob Minson.

Off the field, Minson is known for his multi-faceted abilities - he plays saxophone, speaks fluent German and studied civil engineering at the University of Melbourne. He is also heavily involved with the charity Red Dust, which operates sporting and lifestyle clinics in remote aboriginal communities and, more recently, in very poor areas of India.
