= Christian Argenti =

Australian singer and radio presenter (born 1975)

- Born: 3 January 1975 (age 51); Fitzroy, Victoria, Australia
- Origin: Melbourne, Australia
- Years active: 2000–present
- Labels: Mushroom Records (Aust), Atlantic Records (U.S)
- Formerly of: Invertigo

Christian Argenti (born 3 January 1975 in Fitzroy, Australia), is an Australian singer and radio presenter.

== Invertigo ==
Argenti rose to prominence as lead singer of Australian band Invertigo who had the Australian ARIA chart hits "Desensitized" (June 2000) and "Chances Are" (November 2000) and the band's only album to date Forum (July 2001).

Invertigo signed a much publicised worldwide recording deal with the Atlantic recording label in the United States in 1999, but after receiving a disappointing response from American radio with "Desensitized" and only moderate success with "Chances Are", were dropped by the label in late 2001.

Christian Argenti left Invertigo in February 2003 and has worked as a songwriter and session vocalist since, with credits including the soundtrack for the 2006 Australian film BoyTown (starring Mick Molloy and Glenn Robbins) as well as a string of albums for Australian and overseas artists.

== Radio and media ==
After a chance encounter with a radio program director at a function in Hobart in early 2007, Argenti was offered the host position of the drive show on Heart 107.3 in Hobart. The following day, Argenti debuted on radio and remained in that position until January 2009, when he moved to Melbourne to join Crocmedia as host of All Night Appetite on sports talk radio station 1116 SEN. Argenti remains a regular commentator and analyst on the station, generally covering football (soccer) and mixed martial arts.

In February 2010, Argenti was poached by Southern Cross Austereo to host the networked talkback show Talking Back the Night, broadcasting to 35 stations nationally on the broadcaster's Triple M network. In 2010 and 2011, he also hosted the national drive sports radio show 'The Home Straight' with former AFL player Peter Everitt and former NRL player Scott Sattler on the network across Australia.

The radio industry's governing body in Australia acknowledged Argenti's work when it announced him as a finalist in the category of 'Best Talk Presenter' for the Australian Commercial Radio Awards (ACRAS) in 2011 and again in 2012 alongside veterans Neil Mitchell, Ray Hadley, Paul Murray and John Stanley.

Argenti and his radio show can be heard in every state and throughout a significant portion of regional & provincial Australia each weeknight. Argenti has become well known and at times criticised for his opinionated style and the heavy criticism he regularly broadcasts targeting federal politicians & the federal government often referring to them as 'those clowns' or 'buffoons in Canberra'.

In 2012, Argenti has strengthened a personal 'campaign' against political correctness in Australian society in 2012 and what he calls the 'erosion of free speech and plain speaking in this country', which are two of the more noticeable cornerstones of the show.

In 2015, Argenti was announced as the host of The Greatest Years In Music night radio show on the Triple M network, ending the Talking Back the Night programme.

== Personal life ==
Christian Argenti is the grandson of Italian immigrant Giacomo Argenti who was a controversial international political activist and prisoner in the 1920s & 1930s.

Christian Argenti is the cousin of leading Australian film screenplay writer and director Jan Sardi.

Christian Argenti is engaged and has a daughter Ava Di Anne Argenti (born 30 August 2009)
