= Peter Bevilacqua =

Australian rules footballer (1933–2025)

Personal information
- Full name: Pietro Paolo Bevilacqua
- Born: 29 June 1933; San Marco in Lamis, Italy
- Died: 3 March 2025 (aged 91)
- Original team: University Blues
- Height: 168 cm (5 ft 6 in)
- Weight: 75 kg (165 lb)

Playing career^{1}
| Years | Club | Games (Goals) |
| 1953 | Carlton | 1 (0) |
- ^{1} Playing statistics correct to the end of 1953.

Pietro Paolo Bevilacqua (English: Peter Paul Bevilacqua 29 June 1933 – 3 March 2025) was an Australian rules footballer and soccer player.

Bevilacqua's Australian rules career was short and uneventful at the highest level but was significant for the fact he was the only known VFL/AFL footballer to have been born in Italy (in San Marco in Lamis). His one and only game at VFL level was for Carlton against North Melbourne in Round 18 1953.

Bevilacqua played two senior games for Victorian first division soccer club Juventus (now Bulleen Zebras).

In 2012, Bevilacqua was named in a celebratory Carlton international team as a follower. Bevilacqua died on 3 March 2025, at the age of 91.
