= Michael Dimattina =

Australian cricketer (born 1965)

Personal information
- Born: 11 May 1965 (age 61); Melbourne, Australia

Domestic team information
- Years: Team
- 1984-1990: Victoria
- Source: Cricinfo, 6 December 2015

Michael Dimattina (born 11 May 1965) is an Australian former cricketer. He played 69 first-class cricket matches for Victoria between 1984 and 1990. He also played professional basketball for Melbourne Tigers in the NBL.

== See also ==
- List of Victoria first-class cricketers
