= Forum (album) =

Studio album by Invertigo
- Released: 16 July 2001
- Recorded: 2000–2001
- Genre: Pop rock, power pop
- Length: 48:16
- Label: Standard Records
- Producer: Charles Fisher, James Leigh

Professional ratings
Review scores
Source	Rating
AllMusic	2.5/5 stars
Blender	2/5 stars

Forum is an album by Australian guitar pop group Invertigo. The album was released on 16 July 2001 with some tracks recorded in the previous year. It peaked at No. 11 on the ARIA Albums Chart. Three singles were issued ahead of the album, "Desensitized" (No. 29, June 2000), "Chances Are..." (No. 19, December 2000) and "Say You Do" (No. 31, June 2001).

== Track listing ==
All songs written by James and Vincent Leigh, except as indicated.

1. "Desensitized" – 4:06
2. "Chances Are..." – 4:40
3. "Man Enough" – 3:34
4. "Say You Do" – 4:29
5. "What If It's Me" – 3:38
6. "If I" – 4:14
7. "Blame It on the Stars" – 4:30
8. "It's Getting Personal" – 5:07
9. "Slave" (James Leigh, Vincent Leigh, Gerome Leigh) – 4:56
10. "Typical" – 5:19
11. "Damage Control" – 3:43

== Personnel ==
- Christian Argenti – lead vocals
- Vincent Leigh – drums
- Gerry Leigh – guitar
- James Leigh – guitar, vocals, keyboards

== Charts ==
Chart (2001)	Peak position
Australian Albums (ARIA)	11
