= Paul Zanetti =

Australian political cartoonist

- Born: 8 September 1961 (age 63); Wollongong, New South Wales, Australia
- Occupation: Political cartoonist

Paul Zanetti (born 8 September 1961) is a political cartoonist based in Australia.

He was the youngest paid political cartoonist on a major metropolitan newspaper in Australia. While still at school, he regularly contributed to The Sun newspaper in Sydney, from the age of 16 years.

In 1980, he joined The Sun art department in Sydney where he continued to contribute cartoons. Eight months later he accepted the full-time cartooning position on the Sydney Daily Telegraph and the Sunday Telegraph (Australia's largest circulating newspaper). This position had been vacated by Bill Mitchell, who had moved to The Australian, taking Larry Pickering's position.

At the age of 23 he won a Walkley Award for cartooning.

In 1990, Zanetti moved to the United States to study syndication. On his return, he pioneered political cartoon syndication in Australia, appearing in newspapers throughout Australia and internationally. In 1993, he co-founded Australian Newspaper Features (ANF) Pty Ltd, Australia's first content syndicator of features and columns by household Australian names, Ray Martin (What Does Ray Say?), John Laws (Lawsie), Rene Rivkin (Taking Stock), Angry Anderson (Getting Angry), Paul 'Fatty' Vautin (Life With Fatty) and John-Michael Howson from Los Angeles (Hollywood Hotline).

In the US, Zanetti's cartoons are syndicated through Cagle Cartoons.
