= Michelangelo Rucci =

Australian sports journalist, and writer (born 1963)

Michelangelo Rucci is an Australian sports journalist, and writer.

Of Italian descent, Rucci grew up in the western suburbs of Adelaide, South Australia, and graduated from Woodville High School. He has a Bachelor of Science degree from the University of Adelaide. He is a sports writer in Adelaide and was the longest-serving the chief Australian rules football writer for The Advertiser, Adelaide's only daily newspaper.

Rucci also covered field hockey for News Limited in the 1988 and 2000 Summer Olympics. He won the sport's highest honour, the President's Award, in 1997.

In 1999, Rucci published and co-authored Dynasty, the story of Port Adelaide coach Fos Williams and his family's dynasty in football.

In 2022, Rucci was editor of "Chasing The Dream", the book commemorating 50 years of greyhound racing at Angle Park written by Ray Fewings.

The SANFL in 2007 awarded Rucci its Gold Media Award for his outstanding contribution to covering football in South Australia.

He is a selector for the South Australian Football Hall of Fame.

Rucci was added to the Australian Football Hall of Fame selection committee in 2011.

After 22 years at Adelaide radio station 1395FIVEaa, Rucci moved in 2019 to SEN1629SA to co-host the drive-time sports show with Kym Dillon. In the same year, Rucci ended his full-time commitment with The Advertiser after a 37-year stint. He remained as a Saturday columnist and online columnist during the AFL season until April 2020.

In March 2020, Rucci joined the Port Adelaide Football Club as a 'specialist content producer' for the club's website and special publications. Rucci joined InDaily as a football analyst in July 2020.
