= Daniel Harford =

Australian rules footballer (born 1977)

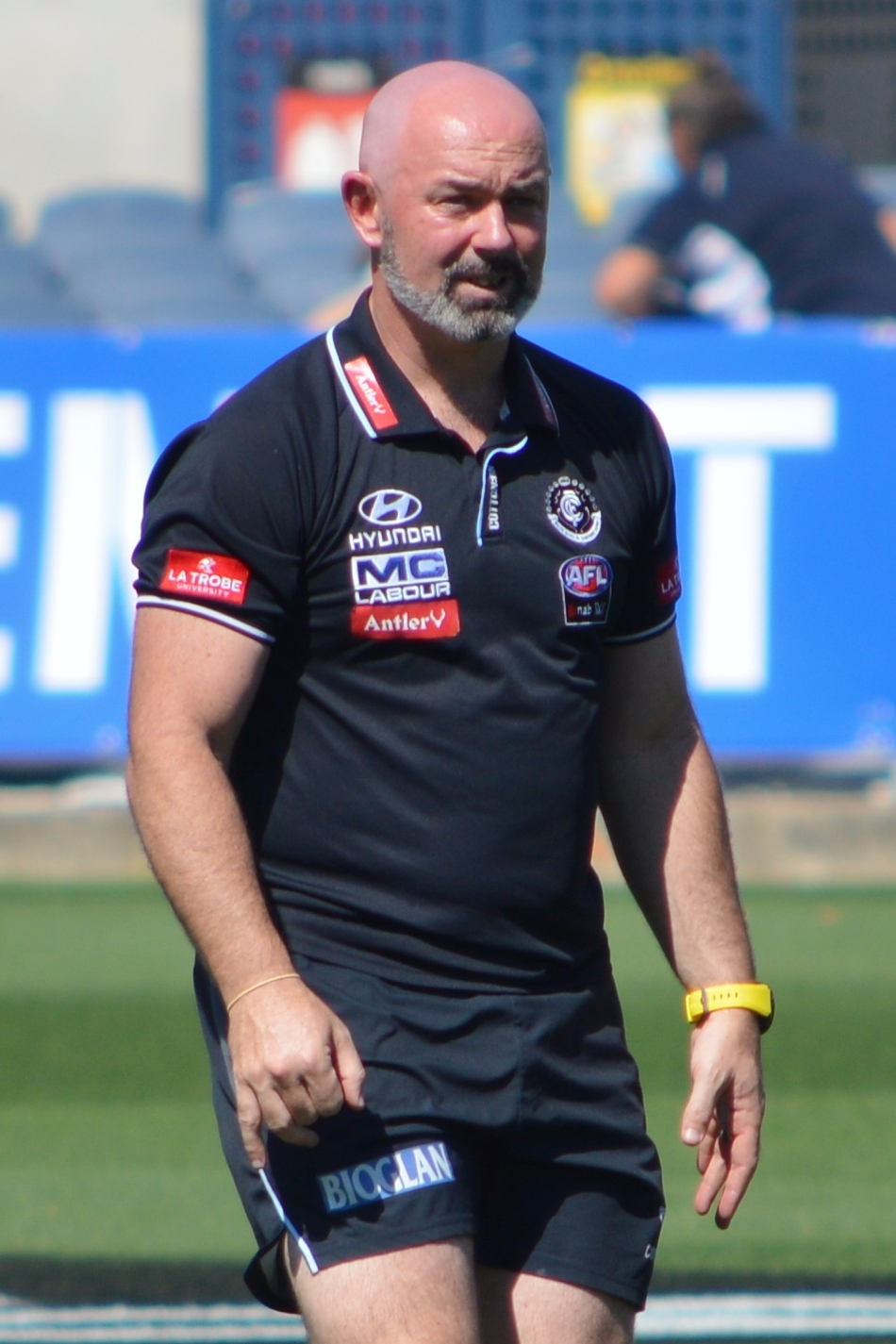
- Harford with Carlton in March 2019

Personal information
- Full name: Daniel Harford
- Born: 19 March 1977 (age 49)
- Original team: St Marys (VAFA) / Northern U18
- Debut: Round 10, 4 June 1995, Hawthorn vs. Carlton, at Optus Oval

Playing career^{1}
Years	Club	Games (Goals)
1995–2003	Hawthorn	153 (67)
2004	Carlton	9 (2)
Total		162 (69)

Coaching career^{3}
Years	Club	Games (W–L–D)
2019–2022 (S7)	Carlton (W)	45 (22–21–2)
- ^{1} Playing statistics correct to the end of 2004.^{3} Coaching statistics correct as of 2023.

Career highlights
- Larke Medal 1994; Hawthorn night premiership side 1999

Daniel Harford (born 19 March 1977) is a former Australian rules footballer and coach. Harford played for the Hawthorn Football Club and Carlton Football Club in the Australian Football League (AFL) and was senior coach of Carlton in the AFL Women's (AFLW). He is also a radio presenter and commentator.

== Playing career ==
=== Junior football ===
Originally from Parade College, Harford was a Teal Cup captain of Victoria as a youngster. He played junior football for St Mary's in the Diamond Valley Football League, and was recruited from the Northern U18 team by the Hawthorn Football Club with the 8th overall selection in the 1994 AFL draft.

=== AFL football ===
While at Hawthorn, where he made his debut in 1995, Harford was a hard-at-the-ball midfielder or occasionally, small forward. He also made regular appearances on The Footy Show during this period.

In 2002, Harford managed just 11 games, suffering a run of injuries, and continued to struggle for form and fitness in 2003 where he played only another 5 games. Although Harford was on a long-term contract, Hawthorn decided to try to offload him, and at the end of the year Carlton contracted traded pick no. 51 for him, with Hawthorn paying half his contract. During a pre-season run in October 2004 Harford, decided to retire from AFL football.

=== Local football ===
Harford played VAFA football for Old Paradians in 2005, and returned to the VFL to play for the Northern Bullants, with whom he had previously played while on the Carlton list. He was consistently one of the best in the Bullants' minor premiership team, winning the Laurie Hill Trophy as the Bullants' best and fairest, and finishing third in the J. J. Liston Trophy count.

In 2007, Harford moved to the Balwyn Football Club in the Eastern Football League. He played there in 2007, served as playing-coach in 2008 (winning the premiership that season), and retired from playing at the end of 2008.

== Coaching career ==
=== Local football ===
Harford continued to serve as non-playing coach at Balwyn until 2011, then as coach at St Kevin's Old Boys in 2012.

=== AFL Women's ===
After serving as an assistant coach with Collingwood during the 2018 AFL Women's season, he was appointed the senior coach of Carlton's AFLW team in April 2018 for the 2019 season onward. In January 2023, Harford was sacked as senior coach after a comprehensive review into the Carlton AFLW Program following a drastic decline in on-field performances.

== Coaching statistics ==
Legend
W	Wins	L	Losses	D	Draws	W%	Winning percentage	LP	Ladder position	LT	League teams

Season	Team	Games	W	L	D	W %	LP	LT
2019	Carlton	9	5	4	0	55.6%	1^{c}/5^{o} (Note: In 2019 and 2020, the AFLW was split into two conferences. ^{c} denotes the statistic for Carlton's conference, while ^{o} denotes the statistic if the conferences were combined.)	5^{c}/10^{o}
2020	Carlton	7	6	1	0	85.7%	2^{c}/3^{o}	7^{c}/14^{o}
2021	Carlton	9	5	4	0	55.6%	7	14
2022 (S6)	Carlton	10	4	6	0	40.0%	8	14
2022 (S7)	Carlton	10	2	6	2	20.0%	14	18
Career totals		45	22	21	2	48.9%		

== Media career ==
Harford joined fledgling Melbourne sports radio network SEN 1116 in 2005 as a presenter, after his retirement from the AFL and while he was playing in the VAFA. He began by hosting a Sunday afternoon sports show with Robert Shaw, and in 2006 he hosted On the Rise, a morning weekend program, with Jason Richardson. He made regular appearances on The Good Oil, a weekday afternoon show, between 2007 and 2009, before taking over the time slot in 2010 with his own program Harf Time. This ran until 2016, when he moved to the drive program. Harford was also involved in the network's VFL and AFL commentary teams.

In 2007, Harford hosted a motoring show on Channel 9, Test Drive.

In November 2016, Harford resigned from 1116 SEN and moved to RSN 927 to host the breakfast show.

== Personal life ==
Harford is married to his wife Rebecca. They have a daughter, Abbey and a son, William.
