= Lance Franklin =

Australian rules footballer (born 1987)

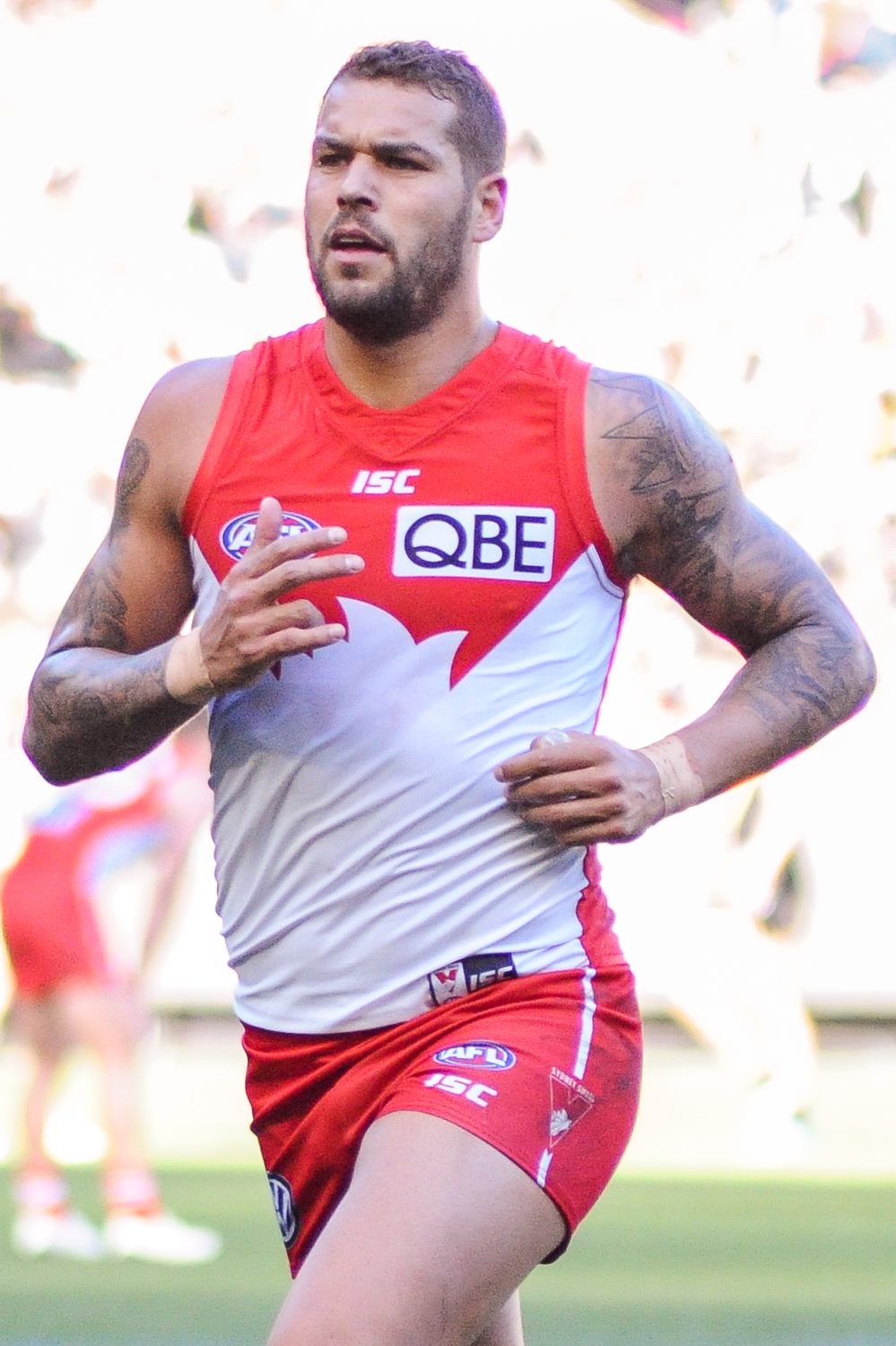
- Franklin playing for Sydney in 2017

Personal information
- Full name: Lance Franklin
- Nickname: Buddy
- Born: 30 January 1987 (age 39); Perth, Western Australia
- Original team: Perth (WAFL)
- Draft: No. 5, 2004 national draft
- Debut: Round 1, 2005, Hawthorn vs. Sydney, at the Sydney Cricket Ground
- Height: 199 cm (6 ft 6 in)
- Weight: 105 kg (231 lb)
- Position: Key forward

Playing career
Years	Club	Games (Goals)
2005–2013	Hawthorn	182 (580)
2014–2023	Sydney	172 (486)
Total		354 (1066)

Representative team honours
Years	Team	Games (Goals)
2008	Dream Team	1 (4)

International team honours
2013	Australia	1 (1)

Career highlights
- 2× AFL premiership player: 2008, 2013; 8× All-Australian team: 2008, 2010, 2011, 2012, 2014, 2016, 2017, 2018 (c); 4× Coleman Medal: 2008, 2011, 2014, 2017; Peter Crimmins Medal: 2008; 6× Hawthorn leading goalkicker: 2007, 2008, 2009, 2010, 2011, 2012; 7× Sydney leading goalkicker: 2014, 2015, 2016, 2017, 2018, 2021, 2022; 3× Brett Kirk Medal: 2017 (game 2), 2018 (game 2), 2021 (game 1); 2× Goodes–O'Loughlin Medal: 2017, 2022; 2× AFL Goal of the Year: 2010, 2013; AFL Rising Star nominee: 2005

Lance Franklin (born 30 January 1987), also known as Buddy Franklin, is a former professional Australian rules footballer who played in the Australian Football League (AFL). He played for the Hawthorn Football Club from 2005 to 2013 and the Sydney Swans from 2014 to 2023. Regarded as the greatest forward of his generation and among the greatest players of all time, Franklin kicked 1,066 goals, the fourth-most in VFL/AFL history; he was his club's leading goalkicker on 13 occasions (six for Hawthorn and seven for Sydney) and kicked at least 50 goals in a season 13 times. Franklin was selected in the All-Australian team on eight occasions (three at full forward and five at centre half-forward), including as captain in the 2018 team, and won four Coleman Medals throughout his career, with his biggest haul coming in 2008 with Hawthorn, when he kicked 113 goals.

Franklin won two premierships, four All-Australian selections, two Coleman Medals and a Peter Crimmins Medal in his time at Hawthorn. He was Hawthorn's leading goalkicker for six consecutive seasons prior to his final season at the club in 2013, and also kicked the AFL Goal of the Year on two occasions (in 2010 and 2013). He also received a nomination for the 2005 AFL Rising Star award in round 4 of the 2005 season. After winning his second premiership at Hawthorn in 2013, Franklin moved to Sydney via free agency on a nine-year, $10 million deal, before representing Australia in the 2013 International Rules Series. He won a further four All-Australian selections and two Coleman Medals playing for Sydney, and was the club's leading goalkicker in his first five seasons there. Despite suffering a number of setbacks through injury, Franklin played 354 games, reaching 300 games in 2019 and 1,000 goals in 2022.

== Early life ==
Franklin was born in Perth, Western Australia, into a family of Indigenous Australian heritage (Noongar-Wajuk) and grew up in Dowerin supporting the Melbourne Football Club. Franklin's father, Lance Sr., lived in Melbourne and played hockey for Victoria before moving to Western Australia at the age of 21, later representing the state in field hockey. His mother, Ursula (née Kickett), is Aboriginal (Noongar). His sister, Bianca Giteau, played in the ANZ Championship for the Adelaide Thunderbirds. Derek Kickett is his uncle. Franklin is a cousin of former footballers Jeff Garlett and Dale Kickett.

At the age of 15, he won a sports scholarship and boarded at Wesley College, Perth. He played one senior game for the Perth Football Club in 2004, kicking one goal, and represented Western Australia at the 2004 AFL Under 18 Championships.

== AFL career ==
=== Hawthorn (2005–2013) ===
==== 2005: First season ====
After attending draft camp and showing promise, Hawthorn selected Franklin with their second pick, number five overall, in the 2004 AFL draft. In a 2012 interview on the Fox Footy program On the Couch, Franklin admitted that his "free spirit" probably scared a few clubs away from selecting him that year. Franklin made his debut in round 1 of the 2005 season against Sydney at the Sydney Cricket Ground and showed a strong presence up forward throughout the year, kicking 21 goals in 20 games.

==== 2006: Promising signs ====
After injuring his ankle and hand early in the 2006 pre-season, Franklin made his way back to senior level through the VFL and returned in round 9 against the Sydney Swans. In round 12, he kicked six goals against Richmond, in what was his breakout game. On 13 July 2006 Franklin signed a two-year deal to remain at Hawthorn after being linked with clubs such as Essendon, Fremantle and the West Coast Eagles. Another six-goal game late in the season prompted predictions of Franklin to be the next big-name forward in the AFL.

==== 2007: Breakout season ====
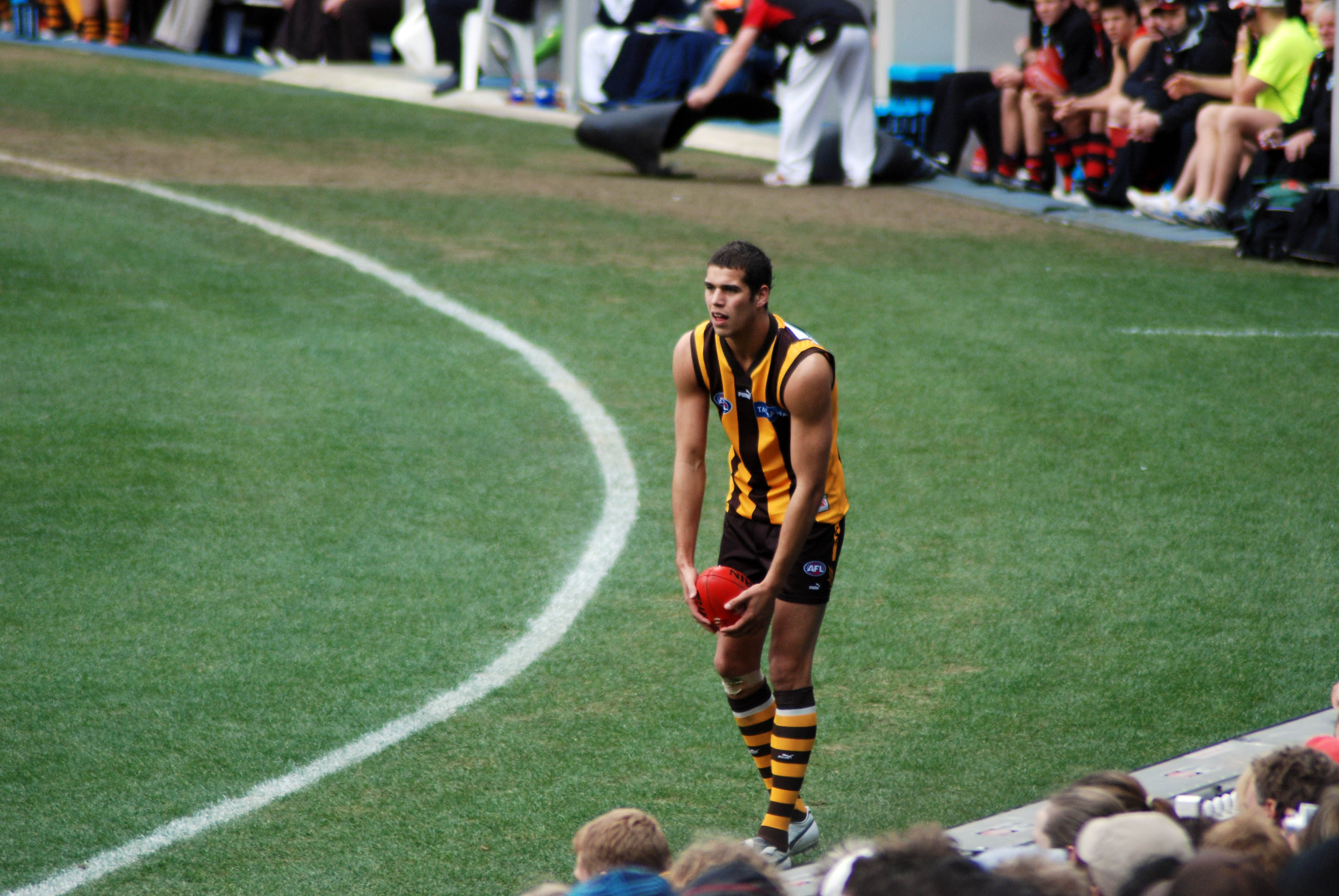
Franklin kicking for goal against Essendon in 2007

In 2007, Franklin finished the home-and-away season with 63 goals, finishing third in the Coleman Medal behind Brisbane Lions co-captain Jonathan Brown and Fremantle captain Matthew Pavlich. Franklin's tally included a career-high nine goals against Essendon in round 6. However, in round 21 against the Western Bulldogs, he kicked eleven behinds with his two goals. Only Richmond's Jack Titus and St Kilda's Dave McNamara have kicked more behinds in a game without managing more than two goals. Franklin was instrumental in Hawthorn's elimination final win over the Adelaide Crows, kicking seven goals in his finals debut, including the match-winning goal from outside fifty metres with seven seconds remaining in the match. Hawthorn were eliminated from the finals the following week by North Melbourne.

Franklin finished the season with an equal-third finish in Hawthorn's best-and-fairest award, the Peter Crimmins Medal, and was Hawthorn's leading goalkicker for the first time in his career.

==== 2008: 113-goal season, first Coleman Medal and first premiership ====
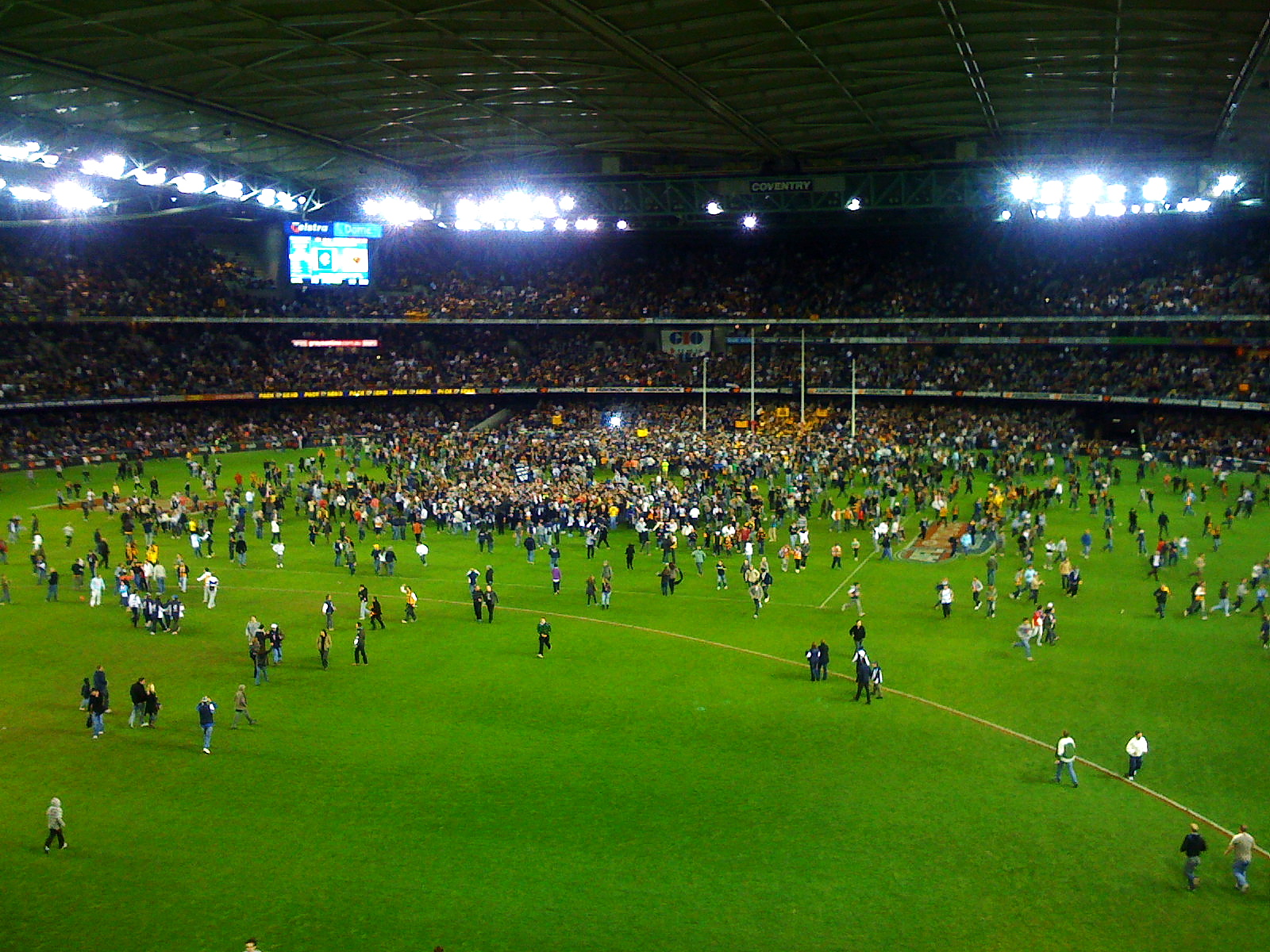
Thousands of supporters take to the field after Franklin kicked his 100th goal for the 2008 season, in round 22 against Carlton

2008 saw Franklin establish himself as one of the elite players in the competition in what proved to be his career-best season, and he won his first Coleman Medal with 102 goals in the home-and-away season. His season-high haul of nine goals came once again against Essendon in round 11. He also played for the Dream Team in the AFL Hall of Fame Tribute Match, kicking four goals.

Franklin kicked his 100th goal for the home-and-away season against Carlton in round 22 at Etihad Stadium, becoming the first player to kick 100 goals in a season since Tony Lockett in 1998, the first player to kick 100 goals in a year since Fraser Gehrig in 2004, the first Hawthorn player since Jason Dunstall in 1996, as of 2023, the last player to kick 100 goals in a year. Upon reaching the milestone, thousands of supporters stormed the field and formed a large huddle around Franklin, who was promptly ushered from the field and into the change rooms until the supporters had cleared. Prior to the match, the AFL had warned of a $6000 fine for every person who jumped the fence. He also was the first player of Aboriginal descent to achieve this. He then added to his tally by kicking another eight goals in the qualifying final against the Western Bulldogs, equalling Dermott Brereton's record for the most goals kicked by a Hawthorn player in a finals match. He kicked just one goal against St Kilda in the preliminary final, before Hawthorn went on to win the premiership. Although Franklin did not play a large part in the grand final, his two goals brought his season tally up to 113 goals. Franklin was named as full forward in the 2008 All-Australian team, his first ever selection; he then received his first Peter Crimmins Medal for his outstanding season.

Franklin’s a physical freak. He’s probably the player I most enjoy going to watch.

— Leigh Matthews, Hawthorn great and four-time premiership coach

==== 2009: Injuries and 100th game ====
Franklin missed the 2009 NAB Cup after undergoing surgery on his thumb and his shoulder in the off-season. On his return to senior football, his form fell well short of his 2008 performances. He played his 100th game in round 19 against St Kilda at Aurora Stadium in Launceston. During the game, one of Franklin's front teeth got knocked out during a marking contest with Saints defender Zac Dawson.

In round 21, Franklin was suspended for two matches as a result of a hip-and-shoulder against Richmond midfielder Ben Cousins. Hawthorn appealed the decision, but failed. As a result, Franklin missed Hawthorn's final home-and-away match against Essendon, which the Hawks lost, and they, therefore, missed out the finals, causing Franklin to miss round 1 of the following season.

==== 2010: Suspensions and first Goal of the Year award ====
Franklin missed three of the first seven matches of 2010, all through suspension, as Hawthorn lost six consecutive matches after round 1. However, Franklin was back to his best form in round 9 against Carlton at Etihad Stadium, when he led Hawthorn to a 50-point win with five goals. In round 10, Franklin was suspended for the third time in eight matches for a head-high bump on Sydney Swans' defender Martin Mattner.

In round 13, Franklin effectively dragged Hawthorn over the line for a win against their arch-rival in Essendon. He kicked five goals for the match, but his last two were the standouts–the final one in particular, a goal from the boundary line on a tight angle after having run from half-back, which was later chosen as Goal of the Year. Franklin kicked five goals in Round 17 against St Kilda after returning from an ankle injury; despite his performance, the Saints forced a draw during the final seconds of the match. In round 22, Franklin kicked six goals against Collingwood, helping the Hawks clinch a three-point come-from-behind victory against the eventual premiers. It was the first time that he had kicked more than five goals since 2008. Frankin was named as centre half-forward in the 2010 All-Australian team, his second selection.

==== 2011: Second Coleman Medal ====
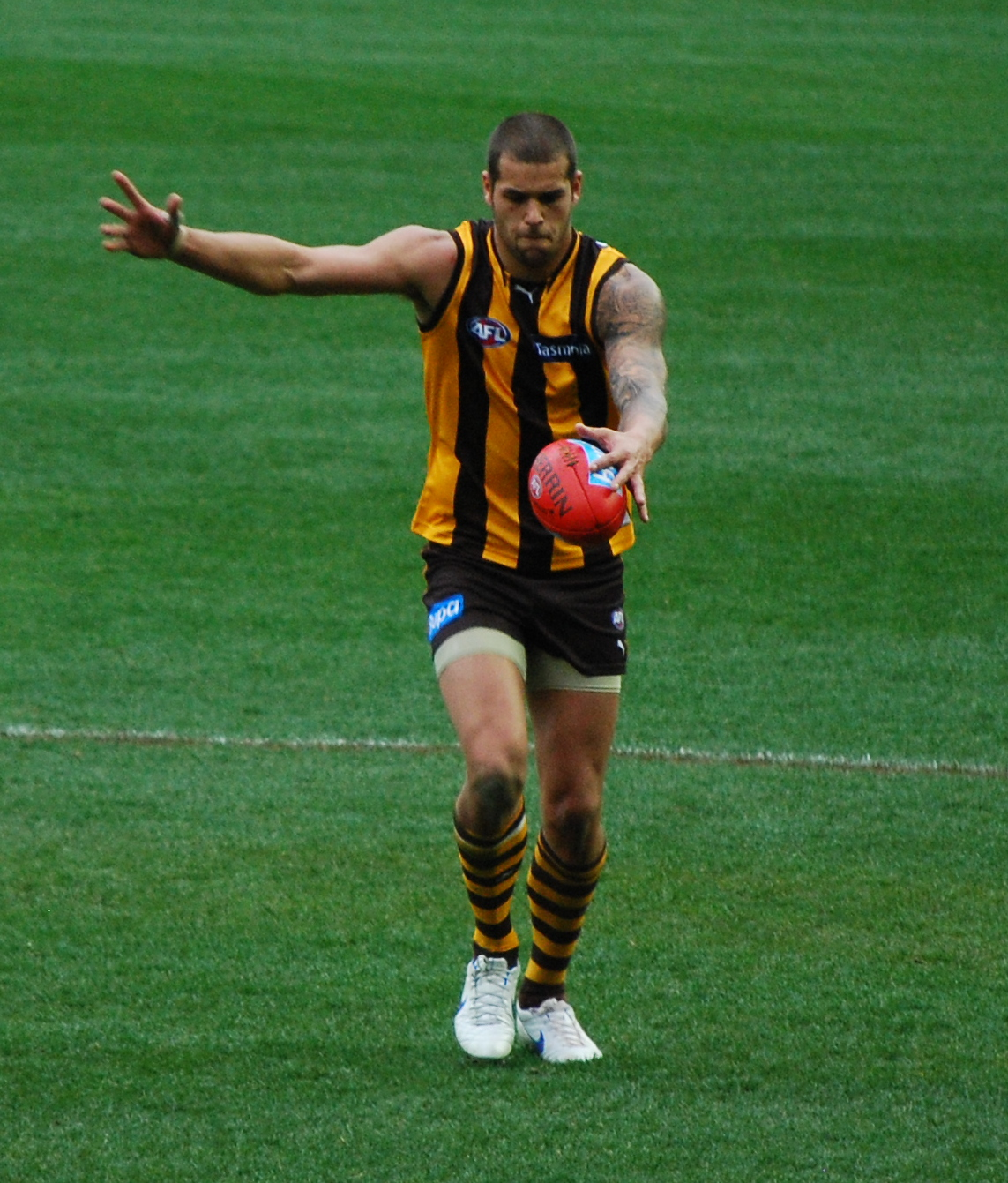
Franklin kicking for goal against Port Adelaide in 2011

After a moderately good year in 2010, Franklin had a consistent start to the 2011 season. In round 8 against the Sydney Swans at the SCG, Franklin kicked his 400th goal for Hawthorn in a six-goal outing as the Hawks beat the Swans by 46 points. He continued his consistent goalkicking form for the remainder of the year, including a season-high eight goals in a club-record 165-point win against a young Port Adelaide side at the MCG in Round 21. Franklin went on to win his second Coleman Medal that year with 71 goals, despite spending a significant amount of time further up the ground.

Franklin was Hawthorn's sole target up forward in their qualifying final loss to the Geelong Cats, kicking four goals. However, in the fourth quarter, he landed heavily in a marking contest and hyperextended his knee. While footage of the incident suggested possible damage to his anterior cruciate ligament, scans later revealed that he had instead suffered bone bruising and bleeding; nevertheless, most observers considered Franklin's season to be over following the loss. However, he returned the following week against the Sydney Swans, kicking another four goals and playing an important part in the Hawks' eventual win. Despite spending time in hospital with a virus in the lead-up to the preliminary final against Collingwood, Franklin was a constant danger, kicking three goals, including a dribble kick in the forward pocket from a tight angle, which almost sealed victory for Hawthorn until Collingwood kicked a late goal and won the match, eliminating the Hawks. Franklin was named in the 2011 All-Australian team, his third selection and second as full forward.

==== 2012: Thirteen-goal game and 500th goal ====
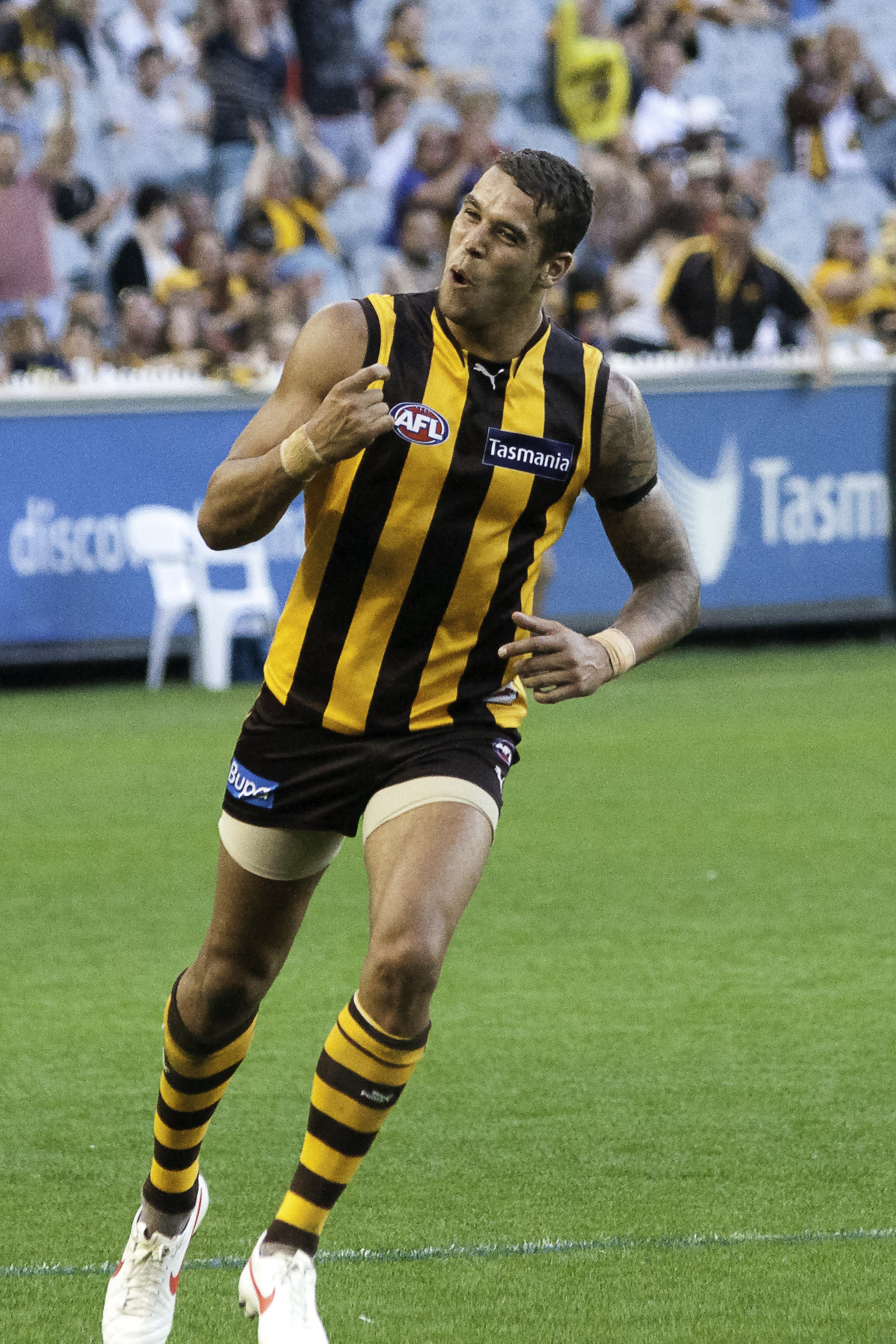
Franklin celebrating a goal against Adelaide in 2012

Franklin struggled early in the season with inaccurate goalkicking, kicking 21 goals and 36 behinds in his first nine matches. However, he dramatically reversed his fortunes in round 10 when he kicked a career-high thirteen goals in a 115-point drubbing of North Melbourne at Aurora Stadium. Franklin was also among five players that year to reach the milestone of 500 career goals, which occurred in a 162-point demolition of newcomers Greater Western Sydney in round 15, nearly eclipsing the club-record winning margin set the year before. He was the second indigenous player to reach 500 goals, the fifth Hawthorn player, the seventh-youngest and the tenth-quickest from debut. However, Franklin suffered a hamstring injury the week before and continued to play, before injuring it further in the Giants game which, along with an illness, caused him to miss six matches.

Franklin returned against Sydney at the SCG in round 22, kicking four goals in a seven-point come-from-behind victory against the eventual premiers, including three in the second quarter. Franklin played a minor role in the finals series that year, but kicked a goal late in the last quarter of the preliminary final against Adelaide which sealed the game for the Hawks, allowing them to qualify for the grand final against Sydney, where Franklin kicked three goals in a losing side. Franklin was named in the 2012 All-Australian team, his fourth selection and second as centre half-forward.

==== 2013: Second Goal of the Year award and second premiership ====
Franklin kicked 60 goals during the 2013 season, the first time since 2006 that he had kicked less than three goals per game, as he became less of a focal point in the Hawthorn forward line, while teammate Jarryd Roughead enjoyed a career-best season with 72 goals, earning him the Coleman Medal. However, a leap and goal on the run in round 3 against Collingwood earned Franklin his second Goal of the Year.

Franklin played in the 2013 AFL Grand Final in which Hawthorn defeated Fremantle; this was the second time that he had played in a Hawthorn premiership winning side. Despite this, his season was dominated by media speculation over his contract situation, and playing in a second premiership at Hawthorn only strengthened rumours of his impending departure, with many believing that he was set to finish his career at Hawthorn on a high note.

=== Move to Sydney ===
Before the start of the 2013 season, Franklin, who was in the final year of his four-year contract with Hawthorn at the time, announced that he would not begin talks with Hawthorn about a new contract until the end of the season. Having played for nine seasons at Hawthorn, he was classified as a restricted free agent at the end of the season, meaning that the club could retain Franklin if it was able to match any rival offers. Greater Western Sydney was considered the most likely destination if Franklin was to choose to leave Hawthorn.

On 1 October 2013, after months of speculation dating back to before the start of the season, Greater Western Sydney shocked the football public by announcing that it had withdrawn its offer of $1.2 million per year for six years, saying that the club was of the belief that Franklin was set to sign with the Sydney Swans. The Sydney Swans' chairman, Andrew Ireland, said later that day that the contract offered to Franklin was a nine-year deal worth $10 million, and that Franklin's management first approached Sydney about the move shortly after the 2012 AFL Grand Final, when Franklin played in a losing side against the Swans. The next day, Franklin said that he did not make his decision to move to Sydney "until the last minute". He also said, "I'm looking forward to getting up to Sydney. It's a great footy club and, as I said, I had to pack my bags up at Hawthorn and saying goodbye to the boys is something very tough, and upsetting, too". Franklin's manager at the time, Liam Pickering, also revealed that the nine-year contract was so back-ended that he would be making less money with the Swans in 2014–15 than he was at Hawthorn in 2013.

Franklin officially joined the Sydney Swans on 8 October 2013, a week after the move was first announced, after Hawthorn decided against matching the offer made to the restricted free agent. The next day, Franklin was unveiled by the Swans at the SCG. Later in October, Franklin travelled to Ireland with the Australian International Rules team for the 2013 International Rules Series. It was the first time that Franklin had represented Australia in international rules football, and he managed one over in the first match of the two-test series. Following the first match, he travelled back to Australia for the wedding of his former teammate Brent Guerra, and was unable to participate in the second match.

=== Sydney (2014–2023) ===
==== 2014: 200th game and third Coleman Medal ====
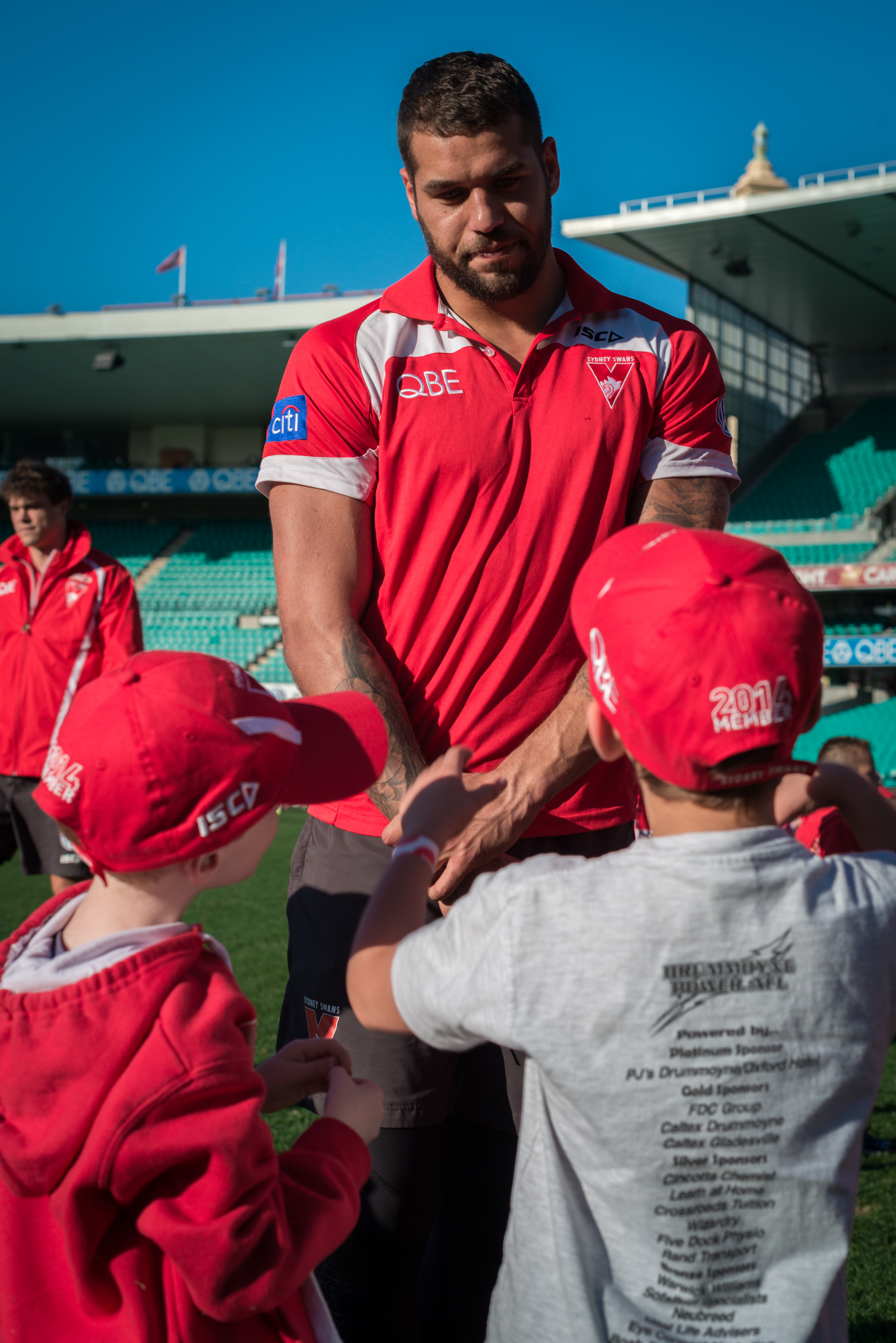
Franklin at Sydney's fan day following the 2014 AFL Grand Final

Prior to the 2014 season, his first as a Swan, Franklin opted to continue wearing the number 23 guernsey that he previously wore for Hawthorn. He made his debut for the Sydney Swans in the round 1 Sydney Derby against cross-town rivals Greater Western Sydney at Spotless Stadium, and finished the game with one goal in a shock loss. After a slow start for both Franklin and the Swans, when they lost three of their first four matches, Franklin returned to form against Fremantle at the SCG, kicking four second-half goals in what would be the first of a club record-equalling twelve successive wins, during which he twice narrowly avoided suspension. In round 8 against Hawthorn at ANZ Stadium, Franklin kicked seven successive behinds in the first three quarters, before kicking two fourth-quarter goals to seal an upset victory in Franklin's first match against his former side.

Franklin continued his outstanding form throughout the season (despite kicking waywardly in both matches against his former side in Hawthorn, registering 2.7 and 3.5) and went on to win his third Coleman Medal, kicking 67 goals in 19 matches during the home-and-away season. Franklin also played his 200th game during the season, kicking a season-high nine goals in round 19 against St Kilda at the SCG. Franklin was named in the 2014 All-Australian team, his fifth selection and third as full forward; he then went on to finish equal-second with Gary Ablett, Jr. in the 2014 Brownlow Medal count on a career-high 22 votes (the most votes ever polled by a Coleman Medallist), beating the tally of 20 votes he achieved in his other Coleman Medal-winning years of 2008 and 2011. Franklin was one of the Swans' best players throughout the finals series, and kicked four goals in the 2014 AFL Grand Final loss to Hawthorn – his highest ever tally in a grand final.

==== 2015: Injuries and mental illness ====
Franklin began the 2015 season with a solid three-goal performance against Essendon at ANZ Stadium, and continued this form throughout the season. A performance considered particularly impressive was his against Carlton at the SCG in round 9, when he kicked seven goals. He would finish the year with 47 goals from 17 games, missing four of the last seven games due to a back injury. It was the first time since 2006 that he had kicked less than 50 goals or played fewer than 18 games in a season. He then withdrew from playing in the finals series due to a mental illness.

==== 2016: Return to form ====
After making a successful return to football during the pre-season, Franklin returned to his best form, playing in all 26 games across the home-and-away season and finals series. He began the season well, kicking at least four goals in seven of the first eight matches to lead the goalkicking for most of the year. In round 13, he became the thirteenth player in VFL/AFL history, and the first indigenous player, to kick 750 career goals, bringing up the milestone with his first of four goals in a 55-point win over Melbourne at the SCG. Franklin's best game of the season came in round 21 against St Kilda at Etihad Stadium, where he recorded an equal personal-best 28 disposals, nine marks and six goals in a 70-point win. He later recorded 17 kicks, eleven marks and seven goals in a 113-point demolition of Richmond at the SCG in round 23; in doing so, Franklin also brought up his 200th goal as a Swan. This took him to 74 goals at the end of the home-and-away season to finish second in the Coleman Medal, six goals behind West Coast Eagles forward and 2015 winner Josh Kennedy.

Franklin was one of the Swans' best players during the finals series, despite only contributing seven goals across the four finals, and was among their best players in the 2016 AFL Grand Final loss to the Western Bulldogs. Franklin was named in the 2016 All-Australian team, his sixth selection and his third as centre half-forward. By season's end, he was the twelfth-highest goalkicker in VFL/AFL history, having overtaken greats such as Wayne Carey, Peter Hudson, Stephen Kernahan, Barry Hall and Kevin Bartlett during the home-and-away season.

==== 2017: Climb to top ten highest goalkickers and fourth Coleman Medal ====
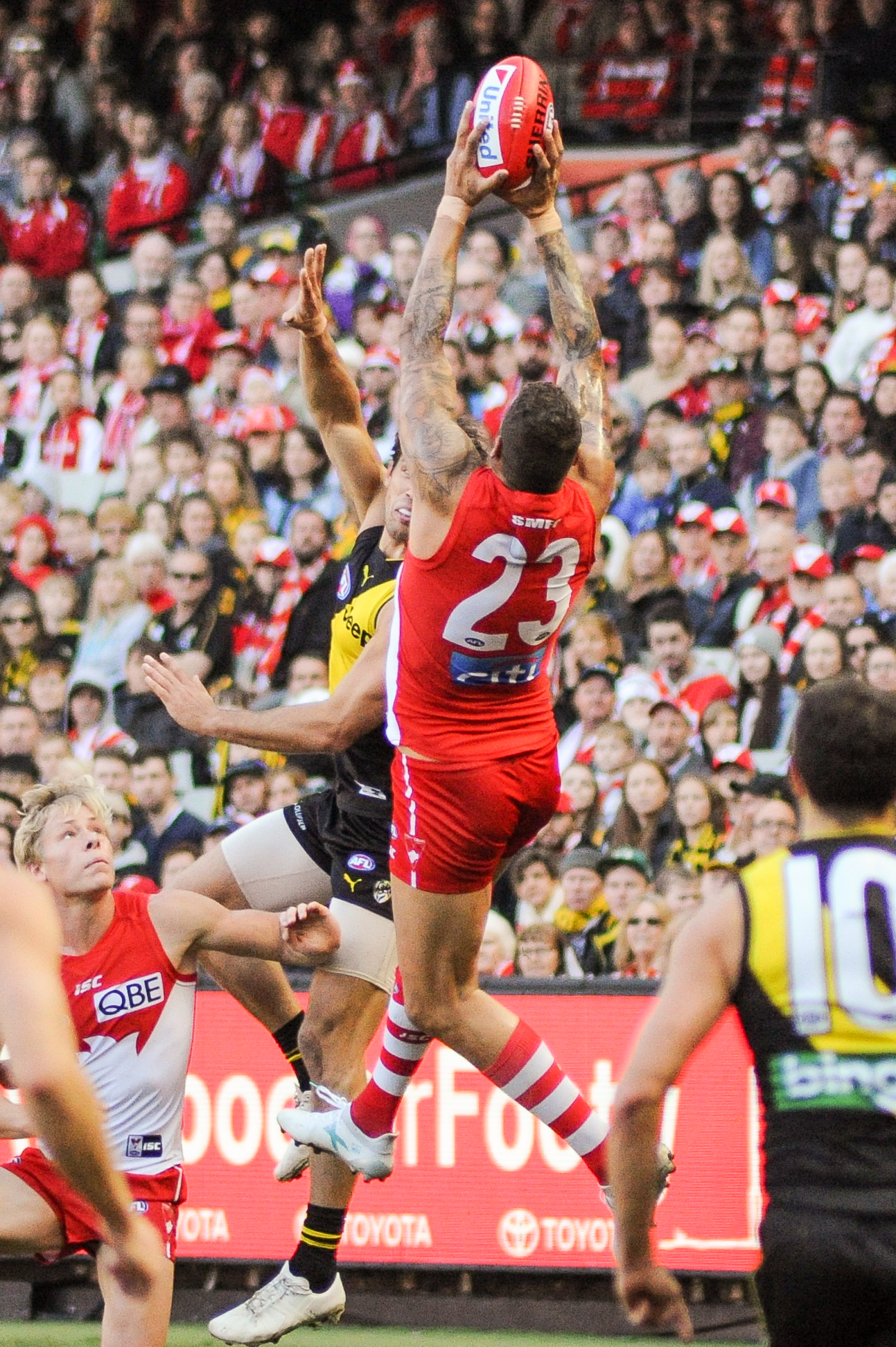
Franklin marking the ball against Richmond in 2017

Franklin played his 250th game in round 3, kicking three behinds in a one-point loss to Collingwood at the SCG. Two weeks later, Franklin kicked his 800th career goal with the last of his three goals in the Swans' 42-point loss to Greater Western Sydney; this was Sydney's fifth of six-straight losses to start the season, which was their worst start to a season since 1993. The Swans' losing streak came to an end when Franklin kicked eight goals in a 54-point win against the Brisbane Lions in round 7. In round 10, for Indigenous Round, Franklin was among a number of players who wore the number 67 on their guernseys to commemorate the 1967 referendum which allowed Indigenous Australians to be counted with the general population in the census. Franklin kicked five goals in the six-point loss to Hawthorn, overtaking Bernie Quinlan to climb into the top ten highest goalkickers in VFL/AFL history. Franklin won the Brett Kirk Medal (along with Callan Ward) as the best player afield in the Swans' Sydney Derby win in round 17, kicking four goals.

In bringing up his 50th goal for the season, against St Kilda in round 18, Franklin brought up 50 goals in a season for the tenth time. He was the first player to achieve this feat since Matthew Lloyd in 2008, and one of only nine players in the history of the game to ever do so; the other eight players had all kicked over 900 goals in their careers. Franklin saved his best performance of the season – and arguably his best for the Swans – for the eve of finals, recording 25 disposals, ten marks and ten goals against Carlton at the SCG in round 23. This was only the second time in Franklin's career that he had kicked ten or more goals, and it took him to 69 goals for the home-and-away season. At the end of the previous round, Franklin had trailed Josh Kennedy, winner of the last two Coleman Medals, by five goals, but the dominant performance saw him eventually finish four goals ahead of Kennedy, sealing Franklin's fourth Coleman Medal; it also continued Franklin's trend of winning a Coleman Medal every three years.

Franklin reasserted his decade-long dominance against Essendon in the elimination final, kicking four goals in a second-quarter burst despite suffering a corked thigh in the first quarter, but was quiet in the semi-final loss to Geelong, kicking three behinds. This marked the earliest exit from a finals series by a team that Franklin has played in (excluding 2015, when he missed the finals series) since 2010. Franklin was named in the 2017 All-Australian team, his seventh selection and his fourth at centre half-forward; it was also the first time that he had achieved consecutive All-Australian selections since 2012, when he had achieved the accolade three years consecutively. Franklin also polled an equal career-high 22 votes in the 2017 Brownlow Medal count, equalling the record number of votes achieved by a Coleman Medallist that he polled in 2014.

==== 2018: Injuries and All-Australian captaincy ====
Franklin opened the 2018 season with his largest opening-round haul of eight goals against West Coast in the first AFL match at Optus Stadium. After missing three weeks with a bruised heel sustained in the opening-round win, Franklin kicked three goals in his return match in round 9 against Fremantle at the SCG, including his 300th goal as a Swan, becoming only the second player after Tony Lockett to kick 300 goals for two clubs. In round 15, Franklin played his 100th game for Sydney, kicking four goals in the loss to Richmond at Etihad Stadium. Two weeks later, Franklin kicked his 900th career goal with the first of his three goals in the six-point win against North Melbourne at the same venue.

After coach John Longmire estimated following the round 19 loss to Essendon that Franklin had only completed twenty minutes' training for the season due to his heel injuries, Franklin played his best game since the opening round in the two-point win against Collingwood at the SCG the following week, kicking six goals. Franklin won his second Brett Kirk Medal as best afield in the Swans' Sydney Derby win in round 22, kicking five goals to overtake Leigh Matthews as the eighth-highest goalkicker in VFL/AFL history, before missing the final home-and-away match with a groin injury.

Franklin was held goalless for only the second time that year in the elimination final loss to Greater Western Sydney as he dealt with a hip problem. His total of 57 goals for the year was his second-lowest in a season since 2006, however he still averaged the most goals per game during the home-and-away season. Franklin was named as captain in the 2018 All-Australian team, which was also his fifth selection at centre half-forward, third in succession and record-equalling eighth overall; this was despite missing four games and hardly being able to train due to injury, which Franklin described as being "frustrating". He later had surgery on his late-season groin injury, keeping him out of training for the rest of the year.

==== 2019: Injuries and 300th game ====
After a slow start to the 2019 season owing largely to an injury-interrupted pre-season, Franklin kicked four goals in round 5 against Richmond at Marvel Stadium, overtaking Matthew Lloyd to become the seventh-highest goalkicker in VFL/AFL history. He was a late withdrawal the following round due to a left hamstring strain and ended up missing four games with the injury, before being cleared to play in round 10. Franklin was quiet upon his return, kicking three goals from his first two games back, before returning to form in round 12, taking nine marks and kicking five goals against West Coast at the SCG. The following match, his 299th, after kicking four goals in the first two-and-a-half quarters against Hawthorn, Franklin re-injured his left hamstring in the third quarter. He ended up missing a further nine matches with the injury before being cleared to play his 300th game in the final home-and-away round of the season against St Kilda, which would also serve as the farewell match for retiring former co-captains Jarrad McVeigh and Kieren Jack; he kicked four goals and took ten marks for the match to be among the best afield, as Sydney missed the finals for the first time with Franklin at the club.

In the lead-up to his 300th game, Franklin said he was "very confident" he had plenty of good football left in him despite his injuries, and that he fully intended on seeing out the final three years of his nine-year contract with Sydney; he also said that he had his sights set on reaching the 350-game and 1000-goal milestones in that time, becoming the first player to achieve both. He later joined pre-season training early with the club's first- to fourth-year players, having lost weight in an effort to overcome his injury problems and return to full training ahead of 2020.

==== 2020: Injury-wiped season ====
In January, Franklin underwent an arthroscope on his right knee after experiencing discomfort; the club estimated he would resume full training in ten weeks, placing him in doubt for Sydney's round 1 match against Adelaide. He went on to miss the opening round match before the 2020 season was suspended due to the COVID-19 pandemic. Franklin was on track to return upon the resumption of the season in June until he suffered a hamstring injury in late May. In August, Franklin was ruled out for the rest of the season after developing groin soreness during his rehabilitation.

==== 2021: Return to playing ====
In January, Franklin was "probably only a week off stepping back into the (Swans') full program" before suffering calf tightness; by March, he had begun to gradually rejoin training, but his return date was still unclear. Franklin made his return in round 2 against the Adelaide Crows. He kicked 3 on the day in front of a crowd of 23,946 and helped the Swans defeat the Crows by 33 points. Franklin was rested for round 3 with John Longmire stating it was part of his training program. The next week Longmire stated Franklin would be in the side for the round 4 clash against Essendon if he got through training without any worries. Franklin kicked 3 goals against Essendon where the Swans won by 3 points. The next week the Swans faced GWS in which he kicked 5 goals in a losing effort where they lost by 2 points. Franklin picked up an injury to his knee and was out for the next 3–4 weeks.

==== 2022: 1,000th career goal ====
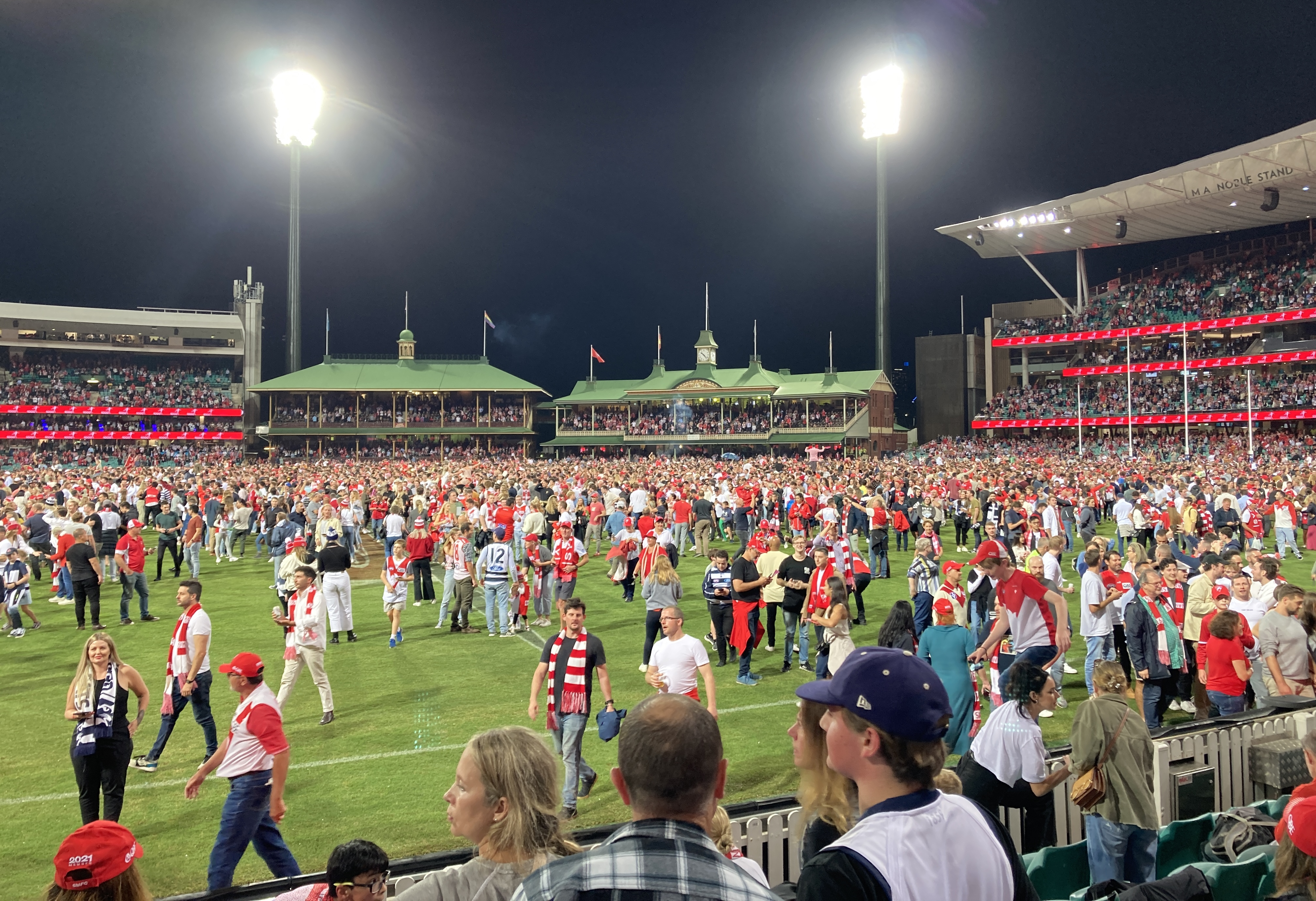
Fans flooding the Sydney Cricket Ground after Franklin's 1,000th AFL goal in 2022

After kicking one goal in round 1 of the 2022 season, Franklin kicked four goals in Sydney's win over Geelong in round 2, becoming the sixth player in VFL/AFL history to kick 1,000 career goals in the process. The Swans ultimately qualified for the 2022 AFL Grand Final (also against Geelong), and in the week leading up to the Grand Final, Franklin announced that he had re-signed for one more year, extending his career into 2023. The Swans went on to lose to Geelong, with Franklin restricted to 5 disposals for the match.

==== 2023: Retirement ====
After injuring his calf in Sydney's round 20 win over Essendon, Franklin announced his retirement from the AFL. He was feted in the Swans' final home and away match of the season with a lap of honour at the half time break.

== Statistics ==
Legend
G	Goals	K	Kicks	D	Disposals	T	Tackles
B	Behinds	H	Handballs	M	Marks
#	Played in that season's premiership team	†	Led the league for the season

Season	Team	No.	Games	Totals							Averages (per game)							Votes
Season	Team	No.	Games	G	B	K	H	D	M	T	G	B	K	H	D	M	T	Votes
2005	Hawthorn	38	20	21	13	140	73	213	75	39	1.1	0.7	7.0	3.7	10.7	3.8	2.0	1
2006	Hawthorn	23	14	31	9	98	58	156	52	25	2.2	0.6	7.0	4.1	11.1	3.7	1.8	5
2007	Hawthorn	23	22	73	62^{†}	201	92	293	123	49	3.3	2.8^{†}	9.1	4.2	13.3	5.6	2.2	5
2008^{#}	Hawthorn	23	25	113^{†}	88^{†}	308	75	383	158	50	4.5^{†}	3.5^{†}	12.3	3.0	15.3	6.3	2.0	20
2009	Hawthorn	23	21	67	46	187	129	316	109	48	3.2	2.2	8.9	6.1	15.0	5.2	2.3	4
2010	Hawthorn	23	18	64	42	205	115	320	99	68	3.6^{†}	2.3^{†}	11.4	6.4	17.8	5.5	3.8	10
2011	Hawthorn	23	22	82^{†}	61^{†}	250	151	401	130	73	3.7^{†}	2.8^{†}	11.4	6.9	18.2	5.9	3.3	20
2012	Hawthorn	23	19	69^{†}	64^{†}	250	100	350	111	71	3.6^{†}	3.4^{†}	13.2	5.3	18.4	5.8	3.7	12
2013^{#}	Hawthorn	23	21	60	37	214	115	329	86	52	2.9	1.8	10.2	5.5	15.7	4.1	2.5	5
2014	Sydney	23	22	79^{†}	51^{†}	267	100	367	139	67	3.6^{†}	2.3^{†}	12.1	4.5	16.7	6.3	3.0	22
2015	Sydney	23	17	47	29	192	58	250	83	49	2.8	1.7	11.3	3.4	14.7	4.9	2.3	8
2016	Sydney	23	26	81	54^{†}	321	136	457	155	68	3.1	2.1^{†}	12.3	5.2	17.6	6.0	2.6	17
2017	Sydney	23/67	24	73^{†}	60^{†}	316	89	405	158	55	3.0	2.5	13.2	3.7	16.9	6.6	2.3	22
2018	Sydney	23	19	57	43^{†}	241	47	288	127	38	3.0	2.3	12.7	2.5	15.2	6.7	2.0	16
2019	Sydney	23	10	27	18	96	21	117	55	16	2.7	1.8	9.6	2.1	11.7	5.5	1.6	3
2020	Sydney	23	0	—	—	—	—	—	—	—	—	—	—	—	—	—	—	0
2021	Sydney	23	18	51	24	157	56	213	81	46	2.8	1.3	8.7	3.1	11.8	4.5	2.6	8
2022	Sydney	23	23	52	28	206	58	264	116	46	2.3	1.2	9.0	2.5	11.5	5.0	2.0	8
2023	Sydney	23	13	19	13	84	38	122	53	29	1.5	1.0	6.5	2.9	9.4	4.1	2.2	0
Career			354	1066	742	3733	1511	5244	1910	889	3.0	2.1	10.5	4.3	14.8	5.4	2.5	186

== Personal life ==
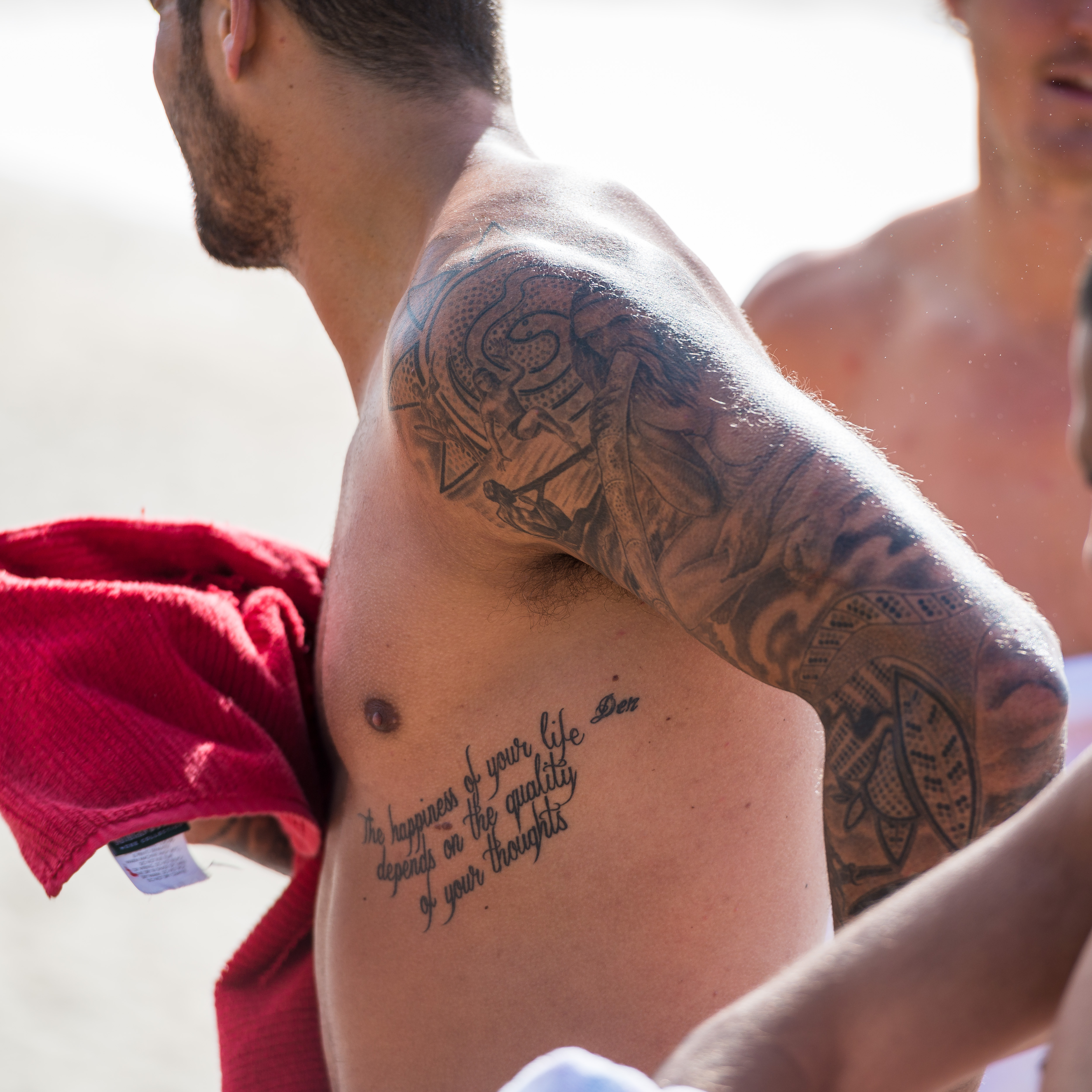
Tattoos dedicated to Franklin's indigenous heritage

Franklin has a variety of tattoos dedicated to his Indigenous heritage. He has been open about his struggles with depression, partly in an effort to destigmatise the mental illness among Australian men, particularly in the AFL.

Franklin married former Miss Universe Australia model and Nine Network presenter Jesinta Campbell on 4 November 2016. They have a daughter and two sons together.

Following retirement from his football career in 2023, Franklin settled on the Gold Coast with his family and works in an ambassadorial role for the AFL in Queensland.

In November 2025, the Franklins moved out of their Gold Coast mansion and stated that they intend to return to working on farmland where they both were born and raised.

== Honours and achievements ==
Team

- 2× AFL premiership player (Hawthorn): 2008, 2013
- 2× McClelland Trophy (Hawthorn): 2012, 2013
- 2× McClelland Trophy (Sydney): 2014, 2016

Individual

- 8× All-Australian team: 2008, 2010, 2011, 2012, 2014, 2016, 2017, 2018 (c)
- 4× Coleman Medal: 2008, 2011, 2014, 2017
- Peter Crimmins Medal: 2008
- 6× Hawthorn leading goalkicker: 2007, 2008, 2009, 2010, 2011, 2012
- 7× Sydney leading goalkicker: 2014, 2015, 2016, 2017, 2018, 2021, 2022
- 3× Brett Kirk Medal: 2017 (game 2), 2018 (game 2), 2021 (game 1)
- 2× Goodes–O'Loughlin Medal: 2017, 2022
- 2× AFL Goal of the Year: 2010, 2013
- Australia representative honours in international rules football: 2013
- Dream Team representative honours in AFL Hall of Fame Tribute Match
- Marn Grook Award: 2007
- AFL Rising Star nominee: 2005
