= List of longest-running Australian television series =

Below is a list of all the longest-running Australian television programs, both past and present, that have been broadcast for a minimum of 6–10 years or 6 seasons (or both).

All data is updated as of 10 May 2026.

Note: Programs with a shaded background indicate the program is still in production.

== 40–69 years ==
No. of years	No. of seasons	Program	Broadcast	Network	Episodes	References	Notes
65	65	Four Corners	19 August 1961 – present	ABC TV			
60	60	Play School	18 July 1966 – 2014	ABC TV	4516 (approx)		
60	60	Play School	2015–present	ABC Kids	4516 (approx)		
57	57	Behind the News	1968–2003	ABC TV			Also known by the abbreviation "BtN"
57	57	Behind the News	15 February 2005 – June 2014	ABC TV			Also known by the abbreviation "BtN"
57	57	Behind the News	July 2014–present	ABC Entertains			Also known by the abbreviation "BtN"
55	55	Mass for You at Home	August 1971 – 2012	Network 10			
55	55	Mass for You at Home	2013–present	10 Comedy			
47	47	60 Minutes	11 February 1979 – present	Nine Network			
46	46	A Current Affair	22 November 1971 – 28 April 1978	Nine Network			
46	46	A Current Affair	18 January 1988 – present	Nine Network			
45	45	Today	28 June 1982 – present	Nine Network			Originally known as "The National Today Show". Not to be confused with previous "Today" show (1968–1969).
45	45	Here's Humphrey	24 May 1965 – 29 February 2008	Nine Network	1776		
43	43	Dateline	19 October 1984 – present	SBS			
41	41	7.30	28 January 1986 – present	ABC TV			Originally known as "The 7.30 Report"
41	41	Neighbours	18 March 1985 – 8 November 1985	Seven Network	9,363		Australia's longest-running and most successful drama.
41	41	Neighbours	20 January 1986 – 17 December 2010	Network 10	9,363		Australia's longest-running and most successful drama.
41	41	Neighbours	11 January 2011 – 28 July 2022	10 Peach	9,363		Australia's longest-running and most successful drama.
41	41	Neighbours	18 September 2023 – 11 December 2025	Network 10	9,363		Australia's longest-running and most successful drama.
41	41	Mr. Squiggle	1 July 1959 – 9 July 1999	ABC TV			Originally titled "Mr Squiggle and Friends".
40	40	Rage	17 April 1987 – present	ABC TV			

== 30–39 years ==
No. of years	No. of seasons	Program	Broadcast	Network	Episodes	References	Notes
39	39	Home and Away	17 January 1988 – present	Seven Network	8,400+		Australia's second-longest running and highest-rated drama.
39	39	Compass	1988–present	ABC TV			
37	37	Media Watch	8 May 1989 – 6 November 2000	ABC TV			
37	37	Media Watch	8 April 2002 – present	ABC TV			
37	37	Gardening Australia	16 February 1990 – present	ABC TV			
36	36	Sunrise	17 January 1991 – present	Seven Network			Originally launched as "Seven News-Sunrise Edition"
36	36	Landline	March 1991 – present	ABC TV			
35	35	Foreign Correspondent	14 March 1992 – present	ABC TV			
35	35	Getaway	14 May 1992 – present	Nine Network			
34	34	The Sunday Footy Show (AFL)	28 March 1993 – present	Nine Network	605		
33	33	The Sunday Footy Show (NRL)	1993 – present	Nine Network	420		
33	33	Better Homes and Gardens	24 January 1995 – present	Seven Network	1,000 (as of 29 June 2018)		
33	33	Sydney Weekender	1994–present	Seven Network	1000		New South Wales only
32	32	Insight	1995–present	SBS			
32	32	Postcards	1995–present	Nine Network			Victoria, also other state editions of various broadcast lengths
31	31	Australian Story	1996–present	ABC TV			
30	27	Totally Wild	12 July 1992 – 30 October 2013	Network 10	4122		27 seasons over 30 years
30	27	Totally Wild	4 November 2013 – 26 September 2020	10 Peach	4122		27 seasons over 30 years
30	27	Totally Wild	27 September 2020 – 27 June 2021	10 Shake	4122		27 seasons over 30 years

== 25–29 years ==
No. of years	No. of seasons	Program	Broadcast	Network	Episodes	References	Notes
29	29	Hey Hey It's Saturday	1971–1977, 1979–1999, 2009–2010	Nine Network	500+		Also known as "Hey Hey It's Saturday Night" 1984-1985
29	29	Lateline	13 February 1990 – 2014	ABC TV			
29	29	Lateline	2015 – 7 December 2017	ABC News			
29	29	Wide World of Sports	23 May 1981 – 1999, 16 March 2008 – November 2016	Nine Network			
29	29	World of Sport	1959–1987	Seven Network	1355		
28	28	Wheel of Fortune	21 July 1981 – 28 July 2006	Seven Network	5628		No relation to earlier series "Wheel of Fortune" (1959–1962); Also known as "Million Dollar Wheel of Fortune" (2008)
28	28	Wheel of Fortune	2008	Nine Network	5628		No relation to earlier series "Wheel of Fortune" (1959–1962); Also known as "Million Dollar Wheel of Fortune" (2008)
28	28	The Back Page	1997–24 June 2025	Fox Sports			Also known as "Back Page Live"
28	28	Message Stick	1999–present	ABC TV			
27	27	Sunday	15 November 1981 – 3 August 2008	Nine Network			
27	27	It's Academic	1968–1969	Network 10	1170+		
27	27	It's Academic	1970–1978	Seven Network	1170+		
27	27	It's Academic	2001–2013	Seven Network	1170+		Perth only (2001–2004) before going national again
27	27	It's Academic	2013–2016	7two	1170+		
27	27	Saturday Disney	27 January 1990 – 24 September 2016	Seven Network	1366		
27	27	Saturday Disney	31 March 2012 – 12 March 2016	7two	1366		
27	27	Saturday Disney	19 March 2016 – 24 September 2016	7flix	1366		
26	26	Insiders	15 July 2001 – present	ABC TV			
25	25	Today Tonight	30 January 1995 – 29 November 2019	Seven Network			SA and WA only, 2014-2019; previously nationally
26	26	The Footy Show (AFL)	24 March 1994 – 25 September 2019	Nine Network	575		
25	25	The Couch	2002 – present	Access 31; ACC	780+		chat show
25	25	Family Feud	1978–1984	Nine Network			
25	25	Family Feud	1988–1996	Seven Network			
25	25	Family Feud	2006–2007	Nine Network			Also known as "Bert's Family Feud"
25	25	Family Feud	14 July 2014 – 22 July 2018, 16 August 2020 – 27 December 2020	Network 10			Also "All Star Family Feud" editions
25	25	The Footy Show (NRL)	1 September 1994 – 27 September 2018	Nine Network	691		
25	25	Australia's Funniest Home Videos	29 March 1990 – February 2014	Nine Network	900+		Originally known as "Graham Kennedy's Funniest Home Video Show"
25	25	New Faces	1963–1985	Nine Network			
25	25	New Faces	1992–1993	Network 10			
25	25	Video Hits	15 February 1987 – 6 August 2011	Network 10			

== 20–24 years ==
No. of years	No. of seasons	Program	Broadcast	Network	Episodes	References	Notes
24	24	Fishing Australia	2001–present	WIN Television			
24	33	Living Black	2003–present	SBS; NITV			
22	22	Talking Footy	1994–2004, 2013–present	Seven Network			
23	23	The Price Is Right	1981–1986, 2012	Seven Network			Originally "The New Price Is Right" to avoid confusion with 1957 version "The Price Is Right"
23	23	The Price Is Right	1989	Network 10			
23	23	The Price Is Right	1993–1998, 2003–2005	Nine Network			
22	22	The Movie Show	30 October 1986 – June 2006	SBS			
22	22	Sale of the Century	14 July 1980 – 29 November 2001	Nine Network	4610		
22	22	Meet the Press	October 1992 – November 2013	Network 10	1000+		
22	22	Sow What	1967–1988	ABC TV			
21	21	The Great Outdoors	5 February 1993 – 15 August 2009	Seven Network	622		
21	21	The Great Outdoors	6 October 2012 – 24 November 2012	Seven Network	622		
21	21	The Great Outdoors	5 October 2024 – present	Seven Network	622		
21	21	Sports Tonight	30 August 1993 – 30 September 2011	Network 10			
21	21	Sports Tonight	15 July 2018 – 27 November 2019	Network 10			
21	21	Catalyst	9 August 2001 – 2022	ABC TV	320		
21	21	Fat Cat and Friends	1972 – 1987	Network 10			
21	21	Fat Cat and Friends	1988–1992	Seven Network			
21	17	Border Security: Australia's Front Line	13 October 2004 – present	Seven Network	199		
21	21	Vasili's Garden	2002–2006, 2008–2013	C31 Melbourne	200+		Moved to SBS for one season before returning to Community TV and then 7TWO
21	21	Vasili's Garden	2007	SBS	200+		Moved to SBS for one season before returning to Community TV and then 7TWO
21	21	Vasili's Garden	2016–present	7two	200+		Moved to SBS for one season before returning to Community TV and then 7TWO
20	20	Weekend Sunrise	10 April 2005 – present	Seven Network			
21	21	Offsiders	2005–present	ABC TV			
20	20	Young Talent Time	24 April 1971 – 23 December 1988	Network 10	804		
20	20	Young Talent Time	22 January 2012 – 4 May 2012	Network 10	15		
20	20	The World Game	2001–2019	SBS			
20	20	The Great South East	1997–2016	Seven Network			Queensland only. Replaced by "The Great Day Out" 12 February 2017
20	18	Escape with ET	1997–2004	Nine Network			
20	18	Escape with ET	2005–2017	Network 10			

== 15–19 years ==
No. of years	No. of seasons	Program	Broadcast	Network	Episodes	References	Notes
19	19	Footy Classified	2 April 2007 – present	Nine Network			
19	19	The Curiosity Show	1972–1990	Nine Network	149		
19	19	Extra	9 February 1991 – 26 June 2009	Nine Network	4540 (approx)		Queensland; Other state editions of various lengths
17	20	The Block	1 June 2003 – 25 July 2004	Nine Network	808		
17	20	The Block	22 September 2010 – present	Nine Network	808		
18	19	MasterChef Australia	27 April 2009 – present	Network 10	1091 (as of 2026)		
18	18	Gruen	28 May 2008 – present	ABC TV	189 (as of July 2025)		Originally known as "The Gruen Transfer"; Also "Gruen Nation", "Gruen Planet", "Gruen Sweat"
18	19	Dancing with the Stars	5 October 2004 – 7 September 2015	Seven Network	147		
18	19	Dancing with the Stars	18 February 2019 – 29 March 2020	Network 10	147		
18	19	Dancing with the Stars	11 April 2021–present	Seven Network l-	147		
18	18	Bondi Rescue	15 February 2006 – 7 August 2024	Network 10	160		
18	18	RPA	1 February 1995 – 18 July 2012	Nine Network			
18	18	Burke's Backyard	12 September 1987 – 26 November 2004	Nine Network	713		
17	17	News Breakfast	3 November 2008 – present	ABC TV			
17	17	Selling Houses Australia	19 March 2008 – present	LifeStyle	99 + 5 specials		
17	17	Who Do You Think You Are?	13 January 2008 – present	SBS	64		10 seasons over 12 years
17	17	Creek to Coast	2002–2020	Seven Network			Queensland only
17	17	RPM	1997–2008	Network 10			
17	17	RPM	2011	10 Bold			
17	17	RPM	2015–2020	Network 10			
17	17	Quantum	1985 – 26 April 2001	ABC TV			
17	17	Sportsworld	1990–2006	Seven Network			
17	17	In Melbourne Tonight	1957–1970, 1996–1998	Nine Network			
17	17	Global Village	30 November 1998 – 30 January 2015	SBS			
16	16	The Morning Show	18 June 2007 – present	Seven Network			
16	16	Toasted TV	22 August 2005 – 22 February 2012	Network 10	4891		
16	16	Toasted TV	27 February 2012 – 18 September 2020	10 Peach	4891		
16	5	Scope	19 September 2005 – 31 October 2013	Network 10	723		5 seasons over 16 years
16	5	Scope	3 November 2013 – 20 September 2020	10 Peach	723		5 seasons over 16 years
16	16	Stateline	16 February 1996 – 4 March 2011	ABC TV			Replaced by "7.30 (state editions)" 2011-2014
16	16	Spicks and Specks	31 January 2005 – 23 November 2011	ABC TV	297		
16	16	Spicks and Specks	2014, 2018-2020	ABC TV	297		
16	16	Spicks and Specks	2021–present	ABC TV	297		
16	16	The Voice	15 April 2012 – 19 July 2020	Nine Network	173 (as of 2020)		
16	16	The Voice	8 August 2021–present	Seven Network	173 (as of 2020)		
15	15	My Kitchen Rules	1 February 2010 – 26 March 2020, 7 August 2022–present	Seven Network	423		
15	15	Big Brother	23 April 2001 – 14 July 2008, 2025 – present	Network 10			
15	15	Big Brother	22 February 2012 – 26 November 2014	Nine Network			
15	15	Big Brother	8 June 2020 – 6 December 2023	Seven Network			
15	15	Everyday Gourmet with Justine Schofield	18 April 2011 – present	Network 10	500+ (as of 2018)		11 seasons over 12 years
15	15	Good Chef Bad Chef	2006–2007	Seven Network			
15	15	Good Chef Bad Chef	3 January 2011 – present	Network 10			
15	15	Pop Asia	2011–present	SBS2			
15	15	Q&A	22 May 2008 – 19 May 2025	ABC TV			
15	15	Millionaire Hot Seat	20 April 2009 – 29 November 2023	Nine Network	1,500 (as of 12 Oct 2016)		
15	15	Millionaire Hot Seat	2 February 2026 – present	Network 10	1,500 (as of 12 Oct 2016)		
15	15	Weekend Today	1 February 2009 – present	Nine Network			
15	15	Good Game: Spawn Point	20 February 2010 – present	ABC Me	415		
15	15	Paul Murray Live	2010–present	Sky News Live			
15	15	The Bolt Report	8 May 2011 – 2015	Network 10			
15	15	The Bolt Report	2016–present	News24			
15	15	What's Up Downunder	2010–2011	Seven Network	115 (as of 2016)		
15	15	What's Up Downunder	2012–present	Network 10	115 (as of 2016)		
15	15	The Project	20 July 2009 – 27 June 2025	Network 10	2000 (as of 12 Apr 2017), 4504 (as of 27 June 2025)		Originally known as "The 7pm Project" (2009–2011); Also "The Sunday Project" (2017–2025)
15	15	The Force: Behind the Line	22 August 2006 – 2020	Seven Network	116		
15	15	Highway Patrol	21 September 2009 – present	Seven Network	92 (as of 2017)		
15	15	Bandstand	1958–1972	Nine Network			
15	15	Pick a Box	2 March 1957 – 28 June 1971	Seven Network			

== 10–14 years ==
No. of years	No. of seasons	Program	Broadcast	Network	Episodes	References	Notes
14	14	Good Morning Australia with Bert Newton	20 January 1992 – 16 December 2005	Network Ten	3213		
14	14	Countdown	8 November 1974 – 19 July 1987	ABC TV	563		
14	14	Homicide	20 October 1964 – 18 January 1977	Seven Network	510		
14	14	A Country Practice	18 November 1981 – 22 November 1993	Seven Network	1088		
14	14	A Country Practice	April 1994 – 5 November 1994	Network 10	1088		
14	14	Hi-5	12 April 1999 – 16 December 2011	Nine Network	595		Spin-off Hi-5 House on Nick Jr. from 2013–16
14	14	Hi-5	15 May 2017 – 16 June 2017	9Go!	595		Spin-off Hi-5 House on Nick Jr. from 2013–16
14	14	Asia Pacific Focus	2001–2014	ABC TV			
14	14	Bananas in Pyjamas	1992–2001, 2011–2013	ABC TV; ABC 4 Kids	356		
14	14	Midday	11 February 1985 – 27 November 1998	Nine Network			
14	14	Blokesworld	2003–2016	C31 (2003, 2006–2015), Network 10 (2004–2005), 7mate (2012), One (2013–2015), 4ME (2015–2016)			
14	14	Sounds	1974 – December 1987	Seven Network			Originally known as "Sounds Unlimited"
14	14	Huey's Cooking Adventures	1997–2010	Seven Network	354		Followed by "Huey's Kitchen"
14	14	Huey's Cooking Adventures	2000–2009	Network 10	354		Followed by "Huey's Kitchen"
13	13	Have You Been Paying Attention?	3 November 2013 – present	Network 10	209		
13	13	The Farmer Wants a Wife	24 October 2007 – 26 September 2012	Nine Network	69		
13	13	The Farmer Wants a Wife	1 February 2016 – 14 March 2016	Nine Network	69		
13	13	The Farmer Wants a Wife	26 July 2020 – present	Seven Network	69		
13	13	The Drum	23 July 2010 – 15 December 2023	ABC TV			
13	19	One Plus One	24 July 2010 – 12 September 2019	ABC News Channel			
13	19	One Plus One	2020–20 July 2023	ABCTV			
13	15	RocKwiz	31 January 2005 – 25 June 2016	SBS	185		
13	15	RocKwiz	24 February 2023 – 14 April 2023	Fox8	185		
13	13	Blue Heelers	18 January 1994 – 4 June 2006	Seven Network	510		
13	13	Brian and the Juniors	1957–1964 (as Swallow's Juniors)	Seven Network			Originally known as "Swallow's Juniors"
13	13	Brian and the Juniors	1965–1970	Seven Network			Originally known as "Swallow's Juniors"
13	13	The Inventors	1970–1982	ABC TV			
13	13	Kids' WB Australia	16 September 2006 – 29 November 2019	Nine Network/9Go!			
12	14	Shaun Micallef's Mad as Hell	25 May 2012 – 21 September 2022	ABC TV	89 (as of May 2016)		13 seasons over 11 years
12	12	All Saints	24 February 1998 – 27 October 2009	Seven Network	494		
12	12	Inside Business	4 August 2002 – 1 December 2013	ABC TV			
12	14	No Limits	2003 – 2014	C31 Melbourne	175		
12	12	The Book Club	1 August 2006 – 19 December 2017	ABC TV	57		Originally known as "First Tuesday Book Club"
12	12	Good Morning Australia	2 March 1981 – 18 December 1992	Network 10			
12	12	The $7000 Question	1960–1971	Seven Network			Originally known as "Coles £3000 Question" and "Coles $6000 Question"
12	10	Australia's Next Top Model	11 January 2005 – 22 November 2016	Fox8	107		10 seasons over 12 years
12	12	The Marngrook Footy Show	2007–2010, 2020	C31 Melbourne	299		Screened concurrently on Channel 31 and NITV 2007–2010; Moved to ABC TV for two seasons 2011–2012; Moved back to NITV in 2013
12	12	The Marngrook Footy Show	2007–2011, 2013–2019	NITV	299		Screened concurrently on Channel 31 and NITV 2007–2010; Moved to ABC TV for two seasons 2011–2012; Moved back to NITV in 2013
12	12	The Marngrook Footy Show	2011–2012	ABC2/ABC Comedy/ABC TV Plus	299		Screened concurrently on Channel 31 and NITV 2007–2010; Moved to ABC TV for two seasons 2011–2012; Moved back to NITV in 2013
12	11	The Biggest Loser	13 February 2006 – 1 May 2017	Network 10	569		Later editions also known as "TBL Families" 2015 and "The Biggest Loser: Transformed" 2017
11	11	The Weekly with Charlie Pickering	22 April 2015 – present	ABC TV			
11	11	Australian Idol	27 July 2003 – 22 November 2009	Network 10	262		
11	11	Australian Idol	30 January 2023-present	Seven Network	74		
11	11	Australian Survivor	13 February 2002 – 15 May 2002	Nine Network	149 + 2 specials		
11	11	Australian Survivor	17 August 2006 – 2 November 2006	Seven Network	149 + 2 specials		
11	11	Australian Survivor	21 August 2016 – 14 October 2019, 18 July 2021 – present	Network 10	149 + 2 specials		
11	11	The Chase Australia	14 September 2015 – present	Seven Network	599		
11	11	The Living Room	11 May 2012 – 25 November 2022	Network 10	200 (as of March 2017)		
11	11	Rove	22 September 1999 – 15 November 2009	Nine Network	354		Also known as "Rove Live"
11	11	Rove	9 October 2000 – 15 November 2009	Network 10	354		Also known as "Rove Live"
11	11	20 to One	13 October 2005 – 12 April 2011	Nine Network	153		Also known as "20 TO 1"
11	11	20 to One	31 May 2016 – 5 August 2019	Nine Network	153		Also known as "20 TO 1"
11	11	Deal or No Deal	13 July 2003 – 4 October 2013	Seven Network	2115		
11	11	Sunday Night	8 February 2009 – 24 November 2019	Seven Network			
11	11	At the Movies	1 July 2004 – 9 December 2014	ABC TV			
11	11	Cheez TV	17 July 1995 – 20 August 2005	Network 10	2,547		
11	11	Good Game	19 September 2006 – 6 December 2016	ABC2			
11	11	Before the Game	1 March 2003 – 27 September 2013	Network 10	303		
11	11	Bellbird	28 August 1967 – 23 December 1977	ABC TV	1562		
11	11	Alexander Bunyip's Billabong	1978–1988	ABC TV			
11	11	Richo	23 February 2011 – 2021	Sky News Live			
10	10	Studio 10	4 November 2013 – 22 December 2023	Network 10	2610		
10	10	The Bachelor	8 September 2013 – 20 December 2023	Network 10	113		
10	10	Who Wants to Be a Millionaire?	18 April 1999 – 26 November 2007, 2021	Nine Network	298		
10	10	Kerri-Anne	28 October 2002 – 25 November 2011	Nine Network	1920		Originally known as "Mornings With Kerri-Anne"
10	10	Super Flying Fun Show	1970–1979	Nine Network			
10	10	Fresh with the Australian Women's Weekly	17 July 2000 – 13 March 2009	Nine Network			
10	10	Australia's Got Talent	18 February 2007 – 25 July 2012	Seven Network	122 (as of 2019)		
10	10	Australia's Got Talent	11 August 2013 – 14 March 2016	Nine Network	122 (as of 2019)		
10	10	Australia's Got Talent	28 July 2019 – present	Seven Network	122 (as of 2019)		

== 6–9 years ==
No. of years	No. of seasons	Program	Broadcast	Network	Episodes	References	Notes
9	9	Julia Zemiro's Home Delivery	18 September 2013 – 8 July 2020, 2022	ABC TV	55		
9	8	Wentworth	1 May 2013 – 26 July 2016	SoHo	100		8 seasons over 9 years
9	8	Wentworth	4 April 2017 – 26 October 2021	Fox Showcase	100		8 seasons over 9 years
9	9	Changing Rooms	1998–2005	Nine Network			
9	9	Changing Rooms	2019	Network 10			
9	8	McLeod's Daughters	8 August 2001 – 31 January 2009	Nine Network	224		8 seasons over 9 years
9	9	Mulligrubs	3 October 1988 – 27 December 1996	Network 10	~500		
9	9	Ready Steady Cook	4 April 2005 – 12 December 2013, 8 March 2024 – 20 July 2024	Network 10	1000+		
9	9	Agro's Cartoon Connection	1989 – 19 December 1997	Seven Network			
9	9	Good News Week	19 April 1996 – 21 November 2000	ABC TV	217		
9	9	Good News Week	11 February 2008 – 28 April 2012	Network 10	217		
9	9	Our House	1993–2001	Nine Network			
9	9	The Don Lane Show	8 May 1975 – 10 November 1983	Nine Network	666		
9	9	Sunday Agenda	4 July 2010 – 24 December 2017	Sky News Live			Originally known as "Australian Agenda"
9	8	The Loop	28 January 2012 – 8 February 2020	10 Peach	421 (as of 8 February 2020)		
8	8	The Mix	2014–2021	ABC TV			
8	8	House Rules	14 May 2013 – 7 June 2020	Seven Network	293		
8	5	Rake	4 November 2010 – 2018	ABC TV	40		5 seasons over 8 years
8	8	Burgo's Catch Phrase	1997–2004	Nine Network			
8	8	The X Factor	6 February 2005 – 15 May 2005	Network 10	201		
8	8	The X Factor	30 August 2010 – 21 November 2016	Seven Network	201		
8	8	Simon Townsend's Wonder World	1979–1986	Network 10	2000+		
8	8	Simon Townsend's Wonder World	1992	Nine Network	2000+		
8	8	The Young Doctors	8 November 1976 – 30 March 1983	Nine Network	1396		
8	8	The Sullivans	15 November 1976 – 10 March 1983	Nine Network	1114		
8	8	Prisoner	27 February 1979 – 11 December 1986	Network 10	692		
8	8	Cop Shop	November 1977 – July 1984	Seven Network	582		
8	8	G.P.	7 March 1989 – 10 December 1996	ABC TV	318		
8	8	Hey Dad..!	11 February 1987 – 17 August 1994	Seven Network	291		
8	8	The New Inventors	2004–2011	ABC TV	314		
8	7	Offspring	15 August 2010 – 6 August 2014	Network 10	85		7 seasons over 8 years
8	7	Offspring	29 June 2016 – 30 August 2017	Network 10	85		7 seasons over 8 years
8	5	Police Rescue	15 March 1989 – 22 November 1996	ABC TV	62		5 seasons over 8 years
8	8	The Daily Edition	17 June 2013 – 26 June 2020	Seven Network			
8	8	Studio 3	7 December 2009 – 18 September 2016	ABC Me			
7	8	Stingers	29 September 1998 – 14 December 2004	Nine Network	192		
7	7	Underbelly	13 February 2008 – 1 September 2013	Nine Network	68		
7	7	Underbelly	2022	Nine Network	68		
7	7	Division 4	11 March 1969 – 25 November 1975	Nine Network	301		
7	7	Matlock Police	1971–1976	Network 10	229		
7	7	Heartbreak High	27 February 1994 – 1996	Network 10	210		
7	7	Heartbreak High	1997 – 29 November 1999	ABC TV	210		
7	7	The Panel	18 February 1998 – 24 November 2004	Network 10	237		Also known as "The Panel Christmas Wrap" 2003-2007
7	7	Perfect Match	1984–1989	Network 10			
7	7	Perfect Match	2002	Seven Network			
7	7	The Bachelorette	23 September 2015 – present	Network 10	59		
7	7	Couch Time	11 January 2011 – 31 March 2017	Eleven			
7	7	William & Sparkles' Magical Tales	5 March 2010 – 2013	Nine Network			
7	7	William & Sparkles' Magical Tales	2013 – 1 July 2016	9Go!			
7	7	Hanging With	15 July 2013 – 20 September 2019	Disney Channel			
6	6	Number 96	13 March 1972 – 11 August 1977	Network 10	1218		
6	6	Adventure Island	1967–1972	ABC TV	1175		
6	6	Sons and Daughters	18 January 1982 – 27 December 1987	Seven Network	972		
6	6	The Einstein Factor	8 February 2004 – 22 November 2009	ABC TV	244		
6	6	Enough Rope	17 March 2003 – 8 December 2008	ABC TV	191		
6	6	Water Rats	12 February 1996 – 7 August 2001	Nine Network	177		
6	6	Packed to the Rafters	26 August 2008 – 2 July 2013	Seven Network	122		
6	5	Winners and Losers	22 March 2011 – 12 September 2016	Seven Network	109		5 seasons over 6 years
6	6	The Checkout	21 March 2013 – 17 April 2018	ABC TV	71		
6	6	A Place to Call Home	28 April 2013 – 13 July 2014	Seven Network	67		
6	6	A Place to Call Home	27 September 2015 – 29 November 2015	SoHo	67		
6	6	A Place to Call Home	11 September 2016 – 21 October 2018	Showcase	67		

== See also ==
- List of Australian television series
- List of longest-running British television programmes
- List of longest-running United States television series
- List of longest-running Philippine television series
- List of longest-running Indian television series
- List of longest-running Spanish television series
- List of longest-running television shows
