= Wherrett =

Wherrett is a surname. Notable people with the surname include:

- Peter Wherrett (1936–2009), Australian motoring and motor sport journalist and race car driver
- Richard Wherrett (1940–2001), Australian theatre director
