= List of longest-running television shows =

This is a list of the longest-running television shows across all countries and categories. To be included, a programme must have been broadcast for at least 50 years.

Programmes with a shaded background indicate that it is no longer in production.

Years	Category	Show name	Country	Duration	Channel/network	Episodes
87	Outside broadcast	Lord Mayor's Show	United Kingdom	1937–1938, 1946–present (not broadcast during WW2 1939–1945)	BBC Television Service, BBC One	
78	Sports outside broadcast	The Championships, Wimbledon	United Kingdom	1937, 1939, 1946–2019, 2021–present (not played during World War II, nor in 2020 due to COVID-19 concerns)	BBC Television Service, BBC One/Two	
77	News show	Meet the Press	United States	1947–present	NBC	4,946+
76	Newscast	CBS Evening News	United States	1948–present	CBS	16,400+
77	Religious program	Music & the Spoken Word	United States	1949–present	KSL-TV	5,053 (as of July 19, 2026)
75	Religious program	Le Jour du Seigneur	France	1949–present	TF1 (1949–87) France 2 (since 1987)	
74	Sports show	Hockey Night in Canada	Canada	1952 (Note: Originated on radio in 1931 as the General Motors Hockey Broadcast and then the Imperial Oil Hockey Broadcast. Became known as Hockey Night in Canada around 1936 when it moved to the newly created CBC Radio.)–present	CBC (since 1952), City/Sportsnet (2014–2026), CTV (1965–1975)	
71	Sports magazine show	La Domenica Sportiva	Italy	1953–present	RAI	3,318 (as of 10 May 2020)
71	Music talent show	NHK Nodo Jiman	Japan	1953–present	NHK	2,900 (as of 2012)
71	Current affairs series	Panorama	United Kingdom	1953–present	BBC One	
70	Talk show	The Tonight Show	United States	1954–present	NBC	
69	Song contest	Sanremo Music Festival	Italy	1955–present	RAI (radio broadcast since 1951, TV broadcast since 1955)	
69	Annual live international beauty pageant	Miss Universe	United States	1955–present	CBS, NBC, FOX	73
69	Annual live national beauty pageant	Miss America	United States	1955–present	ABC, NBC, CBS	96 (102)
68	Song contest	Eurovision Song Contest	(Europe) Various participating countries	1956–2019, 2021–present	European Broadcasting Union	The most recent contest (2025) took place in Basel, Switzerland
67	Science show	The Sky at Night	United Kingdom	1957–present	BBC One, BBC Four	804 (as of September 2020)
67	News show	Telediario	Spain	1957–present	TVE	
67	Children's show	Blue Peter	United Kingdom	1958–present	BBC One, CBBC	5,000 (as of 1 February 2018)
66	Agriculture information	Plodovi zemlje	Croatia	1958–present	HRT 1	1900 (as of 14 March 2017)
65	Animated	Sandmännchen	Germany	1959–present	Deutscher Fernsehfunk, Rundfunk Berlin-Brandenburg	22,200
65	News show	Telejornal	Portugal	1959–present	RTP 1	
65	Soap opera	Coronation Street	United Kingdom	1960–present	ITV	10000+
63	Comedy	KVN	Soviet Union (1961–1991) Russia (1991–present)	1961–present	Channel One Russia, KVN TV	
63	TV feedback show	Points of View	United Kingdom	1961–present	BBC One, BBC Two	
63	Quiz show	It's Academic	United States	1961–present		
62	Song contest	Festivali i Këngës	Albania	1962–present	RTSH	
62	Medicine talk show	Trupi dhe Shëndeti	Albania	1962–present	RTSH	1000+
61	Science fiction	Doctor Who	United Kingdom	1963–1989, 1996, 2005–present	BBC One	875 (as of 25 December 2023)
61	Variety show	Programa Silvio Santos	Brazil	1963–present	SBT	3000+
60	Music Chart show	Top of the Pops	United Kingdom	1964–2006; Christmas shows only 2006–present	BBC One, BBC Two	2,219
60	Documentary	Four Corners	Australia	1961–present	Australian Broadcasting Corporation	
58	Agriculture information	Country Calendar	New Zealand	1966–present		
59	Game show	Des chiffres et des lettres	France	1965–2024	France 2 (1965–2006) France 3 (since 2006)	20,000 (as of October 2012)
58	Children's show (preschool)	Play School	Australia	1966–present	Australian Broadcasting Corporation (ABC)	4,500+
58	Comedy special	Áramótaskaupið	Iceland	1966–present	Ríkisútvarpið	56
56	Talk Show	Almorzando Con Juana	Argentina	1968-present	eltrece	
56	Variety show	Súper Sábado Sensacional	Venezuela	1968–present	RCTV (1968–1972), Venevisión (1972–present)	2,800+
55	Anime for kids	Sazae-san	Japan	1969–present	Fuji Television	7000+
55	Kids Educational	Sesame Street	United States	1969–present	NET (1969–1970), PBS (1970–), HBO (2016–2020), HBO Max (2020–)	4000+
54	Police procedural	Tatort	Germany	1970–present	Das Erste	1,136 (as of 6 September 2020)
51	Sketch comedy show	Radio Rochela	Venezuela	1959–2010	RCTV	2,652
50	Soap opera	Pobol y Cwm	Wales	1974–present	BBC Cymru (1974–1982), S4C (1982–present)	
