= Iain Hewitson =

Australian television chefs (born 1948)

- Born: 4 October 1948 (age 78); Ōtaki, New Zealand
- Years active: 1992–2014 (television); 2017–present (social media platforms)
- Culinary career
- Previous restaurants
- Champagne Charlie's, Toorak; The Last Aussie Fishcaf, South Melbourne; Clichy, Collingwood; Tolarno Bar & Bistro, St Kilda; Barney Allen's Bar Diner, St Kilda (co-owned); Big Huey's Diner, South Melbourne; Fleurie, Toorak
- Television shows
- Healthy, Wealthy and Wise; Huey's TV Dinner; Never Trust a Skinny Cook; Huey's Cooking Adventures; Huey's Kitchen; Good Morning Australia

YouTube information
- Channel: Iain Hewitson
- Genres: Cooking, cooking tutorials
- Subscribers: 12.1k
- Views: 639k
- Last updated: 30 December 2024
- Website: hueyscookingclub.com.au

Iain "Huey" Hewitson (born 4 October 1948), is a New Zealand-born Australian chef, restaurateur, author and television personality who moved to Australia in 1972. He is best known for his television involvement with Network Ten. He was also the face of supermarket chain BI-LO.

== TV career ==
Huey credits late television producer Gavan Disney for helping him in getting a start in television. Between 1992 and 1998, Hewitson appeared on the Ten lifestyle show Healthy, Wealthy and Wise, in which he presented the cooking segments. Until December 2005, Hewitson was a regular chef on the networks morning talk program GMA with Bert Newton. Ensuing programs with his participation include Huey's TV Dinner (2001) and Never Trust a Skinny Cook. He has hosted Huey's Cooking Adventures (1997–2010) and Huey's Kitchen (2010–2014).

Hewitson explained on his retirement from the television screens in 2019:

I was tired, I really was. I needed a break because people tell you that television is the most wonderful thing. You film for two or three weeks every single day and then you get on a plane and come home. It's not glamorous and we travelled a lot and I was sick of it. I needed a break.

He had also been critical of fellow chef Gordon Ramsay stating that he 'doesn't like the style of the man. He is a bully.' He also stated of cooking show Masterchef:

I think it’s beautifully produced and I think the producers are very clever, but it’s a game show, it’s not a cooking show!

== Transition to social media platforms ==
After retiring from television, Hewitson made the transition to YouTube in July 2017 at the idea of his daughter Charlotte. He uploaded his first video titled 'A Perfect Steak for One' in August that same year and new cooking videos are uploaded every week.

Hewitson with the help of his daughter joined TikTok in May 2024. Shortly after joining the social media platform, he was nominated for the 'Food Creator of the Year award' at the 2024 Australian TikTok Awards.

== Musician ==
In the 1960s, Hewitson was a folk singer as well as a member of bands "Cellophane" and "Sebastian's Floral Array". Both of them were winners in the New Zealand version of the Battle of the Bands competitions.

In 1968, he became a member of a band called 691. At the end of the year the band had become Cellophane. The line-up included Hewitson on vocals, Dave Wellington on lead guitar, Michael Hill on bass, Pam Potter on keyboards, and John Van der Ryden on drums. They were managed by Colin Misseldine. In 1969 they recorded and self-produced four tracks at the His Master's Voice studios for Pye. The songs included a cover of the Arthur Brown psychedelic rock hit "Fire"; "Mind Patterns", which was written by Hewitson; and "I Can’t Quit Her". The band broke up in 1970. "Fire", backed with "Mind Patterns", was released on Pye 7N-14009. Both "Hey Joe" by Sebastian's Floral Array, and "Fire" by Cellophane, appear on the various-artists compilation A Day in My Mind's Mind Volume 4.

According to Hewitson, one of his favorite things is the Rickenbacker guitar along with the Vox amplifier his wife bought for him as a surprise Christmas present.

In 2009, at the end of one of his shows, he got his guitar out and, along with his seven-year-old daughter Charlotte, sang "Octopus's Garden", a Beatles song.

== Releases ==
=== Books ===
- Never Trust a Skinny Cook : Huey's Culinary Travelogue – Allen & Unwin – 2005 – ISBN 1741146925
- Huey's Greatest Hits – Allen & Unwin – 2003 – ISBN 1865088609
- A Cook's Journey More Than 150 Recipes from TV's Top Chef – Viking, Melbourne, 1993 – ISBN 0670906239
- The Huey Diet – Allen & Unwin -2001 – ISBN 1865085596
