= Chrysler Sigma =

Car model from Chrysler (1977–1987)

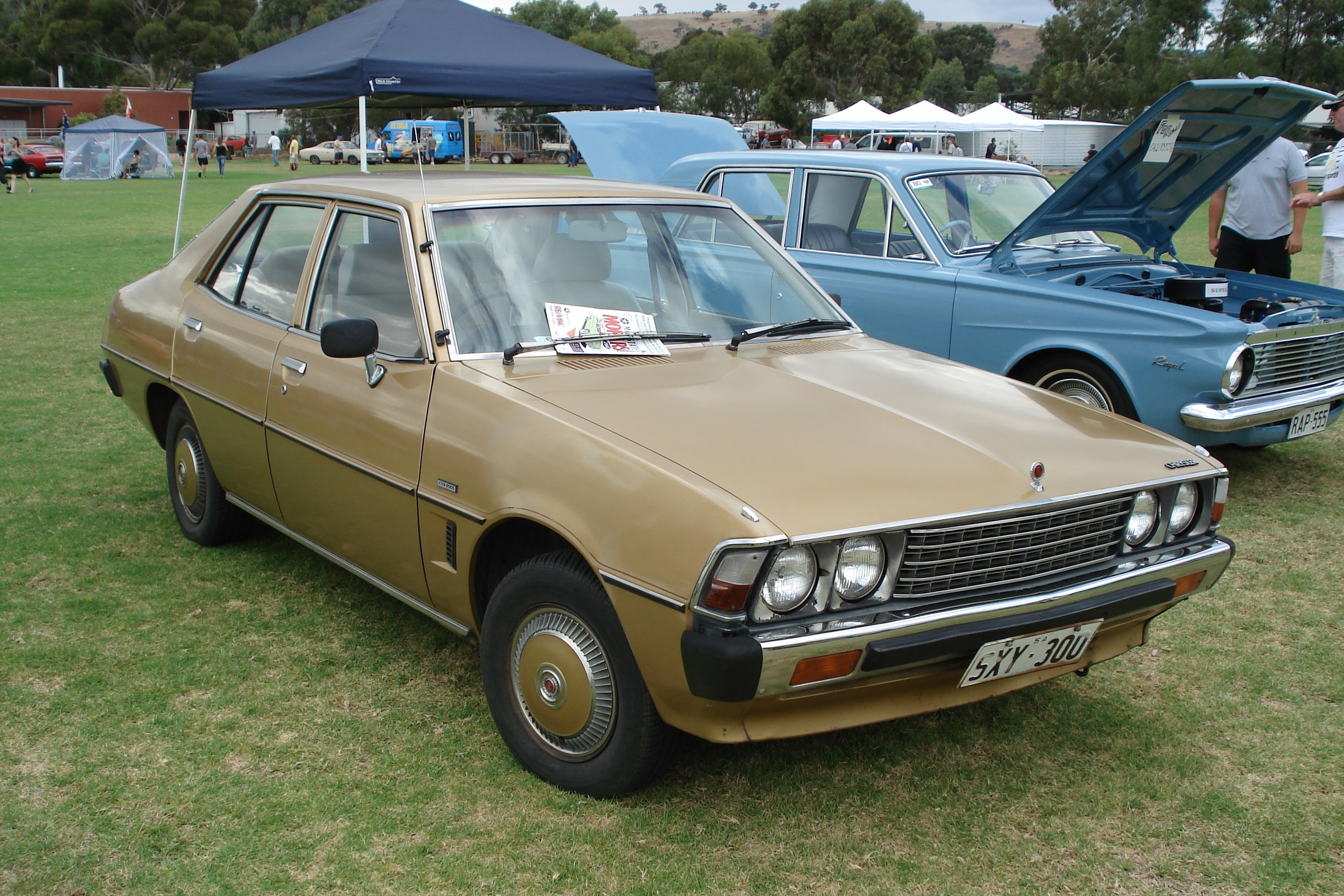
- 1977–1980 Chrysler Sigma (GE) SE sedan

Overview
- Manufacturer: Chrysler Australia; Mitsubishi Motors Australia
- Also called: Mitsubishi Galant; Mitsubishi Sigma; Lonsdale YD41/YD45 (United Kingdom)
- Production: October 1977 – October 1980 (Chrysler); October 1980–1987 (Mitsubishi)
- Assembly: Australia: Tonsley Park, South Australia

Body and chassis
- Class: Mid-size car
- Body style: 4-door sedan 5-door station wagon
- Layout: Front-engine, rear-wheel-drive

Powertrain
- Engine: 1.6 L Saturn (4G32) I4 (petrol); 1.85 L Astron (4G51) I4 (petrol); 2.0 L Astron (4G52) I4 (petrol); 2.0 L Astron (4G52T) I4-T (petrol); 2.6 L Astron (4G54) I4 (petrol)
- Transmission: 4-speed manual 5-speed manual 3-speed automatic

Chronology
- Predecessor: Chrysler Galant
- Successor: Mitsubishi Magna (officially); Chrysler 300 (as a Chrysler)

The Chrysler Sigma is a version of the Mitsubishi Galant automobile that was built by Chrysler Australia in Adelaide, South Australia from 1977. When Mitsubishi Motors Australia (MMAL) took over Chrysler Australia's manufacturing facilities in 1980, they renamed the vehicle the Mitsubishi Sigma. The range was progressively discontinued and replaced by the Mitsubishi Magna, starting with the sedan in 1985 and the wagon in 1987.

== First generation ==
=== GE (1977–1980) ===
Chrysler launched the GE series Sigma in October 1977 to replace the outgoing GD Galant. Assembly occurred at the Tonsley Park, Adelaide plant.

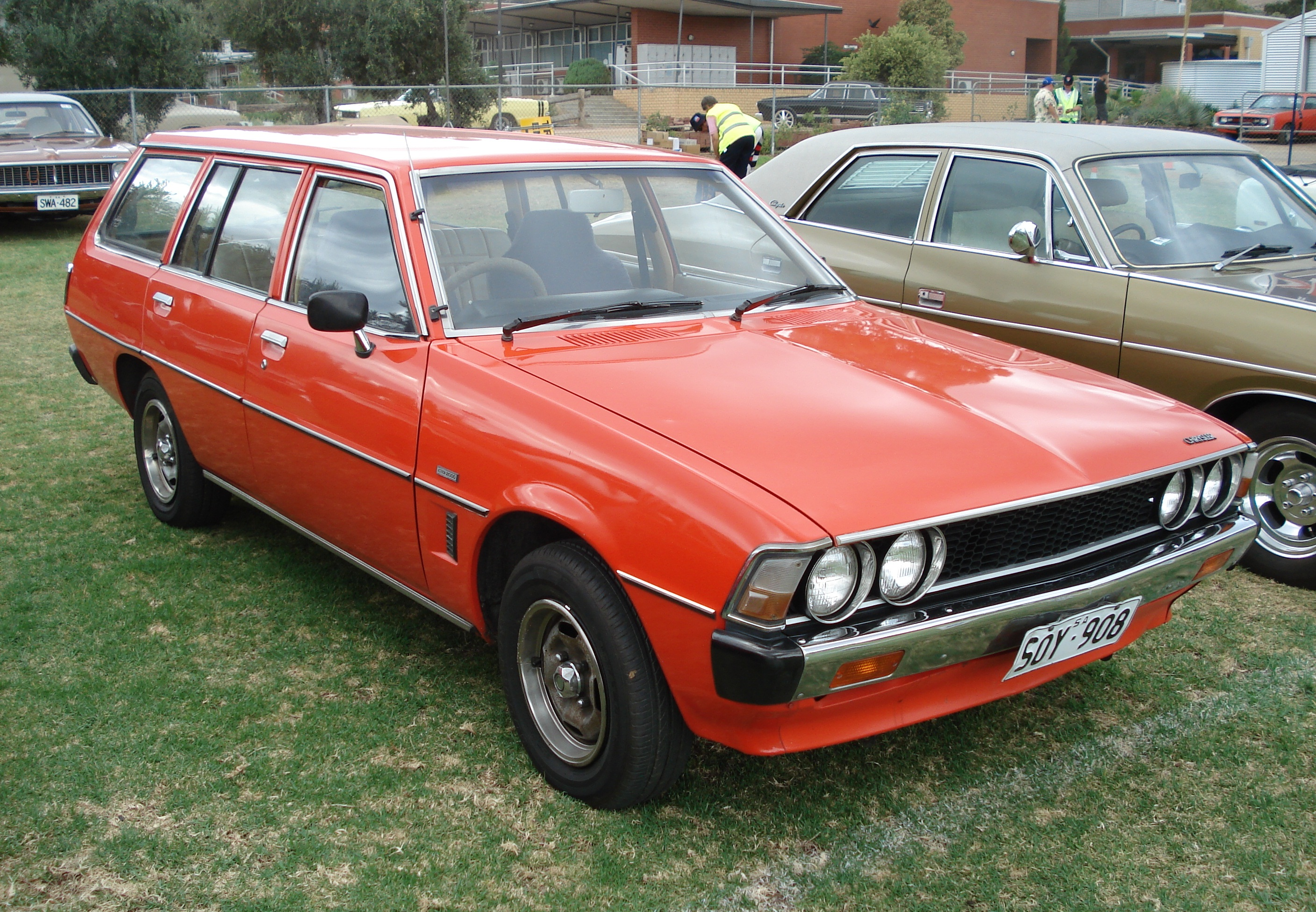
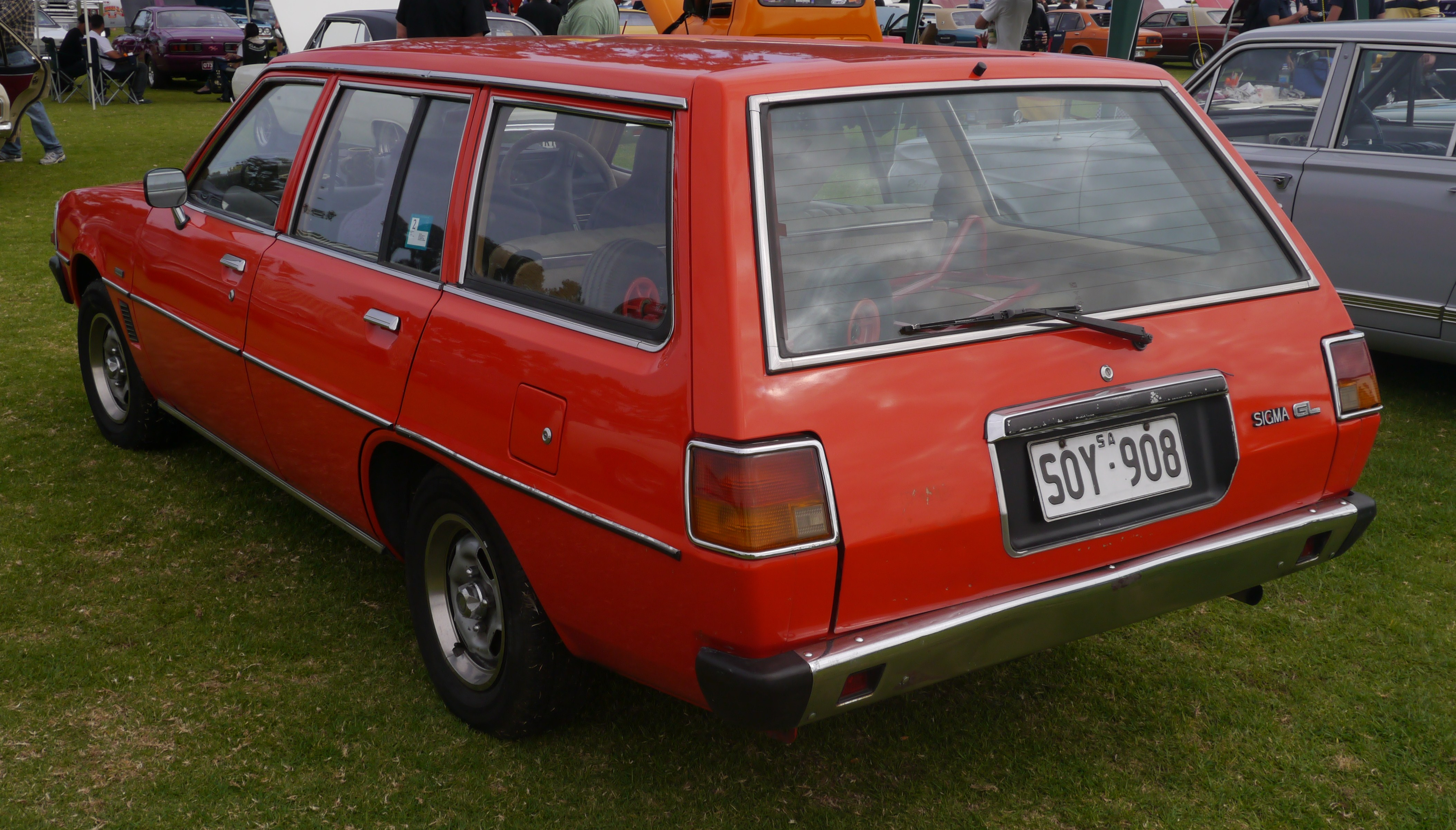
Chrysler Sigma (GE) GL 2.0 wagon

The GE series Sigma was the first to introduce the Australian market to the Astron engine range. The 1.6-litre Saturn engine with four-speed manual transmission was also available in the base model, badged Sigma Galant. The Saturn engine was good for 56 kW (75 hp) of power and 117 N⋅m (86 lb⋅ft) of torque. The mid-range model, the Sigma GL, came standard with the 1.85-litre Astron and four-speed manual, providing 60 kW (80 hp) and 145 N⋅m (107 lb⋅ft). Both Galant and GL had an upgrade option to the 2.0-litre Astron engine—standard with four-speed manual or optional five-speed manual or three-speed automatic. Outputs for the 2.0-litre were 64 kW (86 hp) and 145 N⋅m (107 lb⋅ft). The top-line model, the Sigma SE, offered the 2.0-litre and five-speed standard—automatic remained an option. The Astron engines were initially imported, with the Lonsdale, South Australia engine plant producing the Astron from October 1979.

Sigma SE offered equipment including five-position, reclining rear seats. An interior boot lid release, roof console (incorporating dome lamp, map reading lamp, seat belt and door ajar warning lamps), steel belt radial ply tyres, laminated windscreen, distinctive grille, smoked glass on all instrument dials, front seat back pockets, and Ivanhoe cloth trim were also standard with the SE (with leather optional). The SE was further distinguished by its body-coloured hubcaps with silver trim.

From launch, Chrysler also offered a "Sportspack" option for the GL 2.0-litre. This included exterior striping, quartz-halogen high-beam headlights, a sports steering wheel, low-fuel warning light, tachometer and steel belted radial tyres.

In March 1978, a Japanese-made, two-door coupé version called the "Sigma Scorpion" was released—based on the Mitsubishi Galant Lambda. Although the Sigma Scorpion shared many common engine and mechanical components with the sedan, all body panels and most interior features were unique to the coupe. On 12 October 1978, a station wagon body variant of the Sigma was released—available in Galant, GL, and SE trims.

On 1 November 1979, Chrysler announced and commenced sales of the enlarged, 2.6-litre Astron engined Sigma GL and SE. At the same time, the 1.85-litre engine was dropped. Paired only with the automatic gearbox, 2.6-litre was believed to be the biggest four-cylinder engine sold internationally at the time. The 2.6 came further equipped a new braking system with larger front discs and a 56 percent increase in pad area. 14-inch cast alloy wheels were also made available as a further option for the 2.6. The 2.6 was noted for its smoothness and refinement, although less so than its 2.0-litre counterpart. Its large displacement made it competitive with six-cylinder rivals. Chrysler claimed 73 kW (98 hp) of power and torque of 188 N⋅m (139 lb⋅ft). According to Chrysler, this made it the most powerful four-cylinder engine sold in Australia at the time.

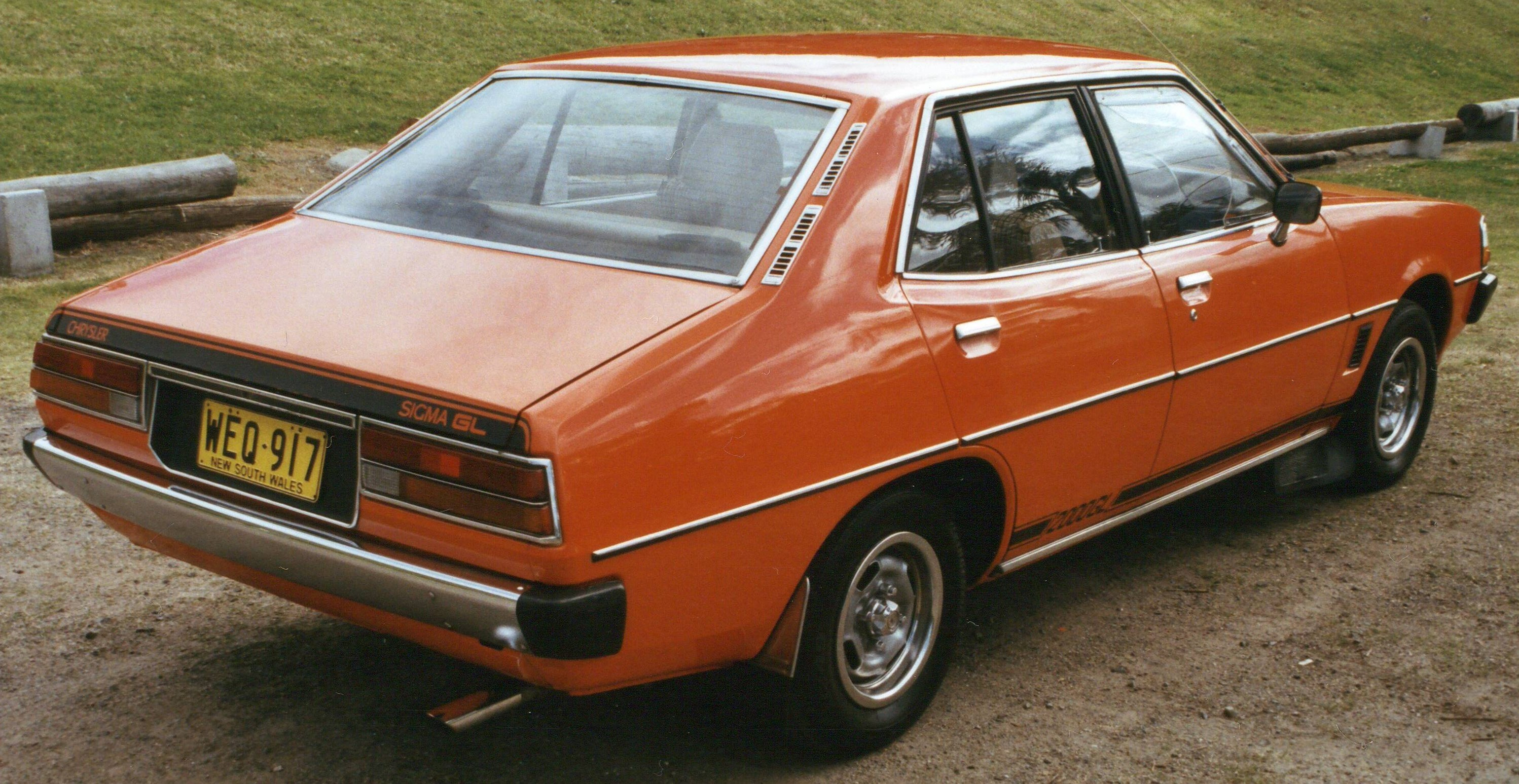
Chrysler Sigma (GE) GL Sportspack sedan

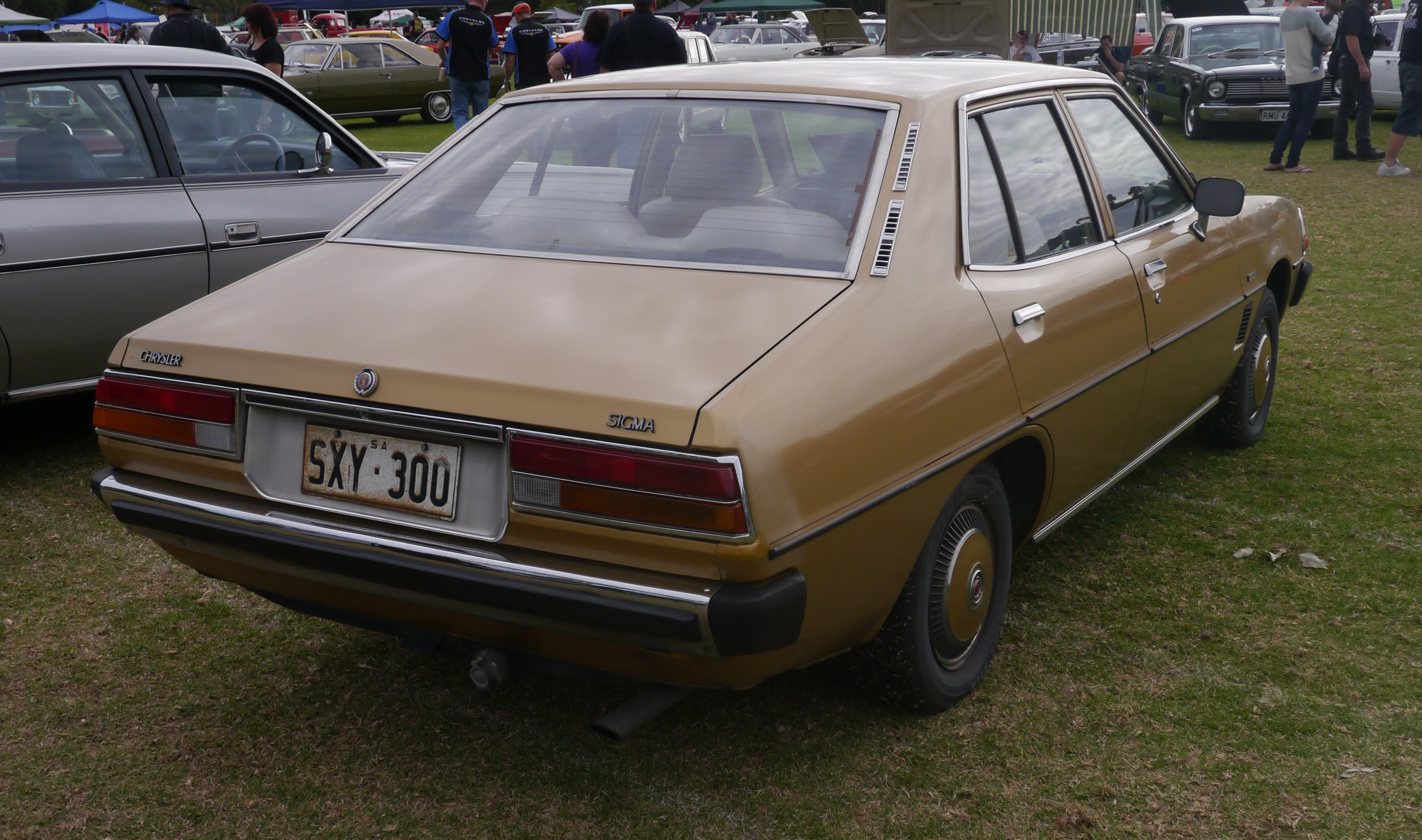
Chrysler Sigma (GE) SE 2.0 sedan

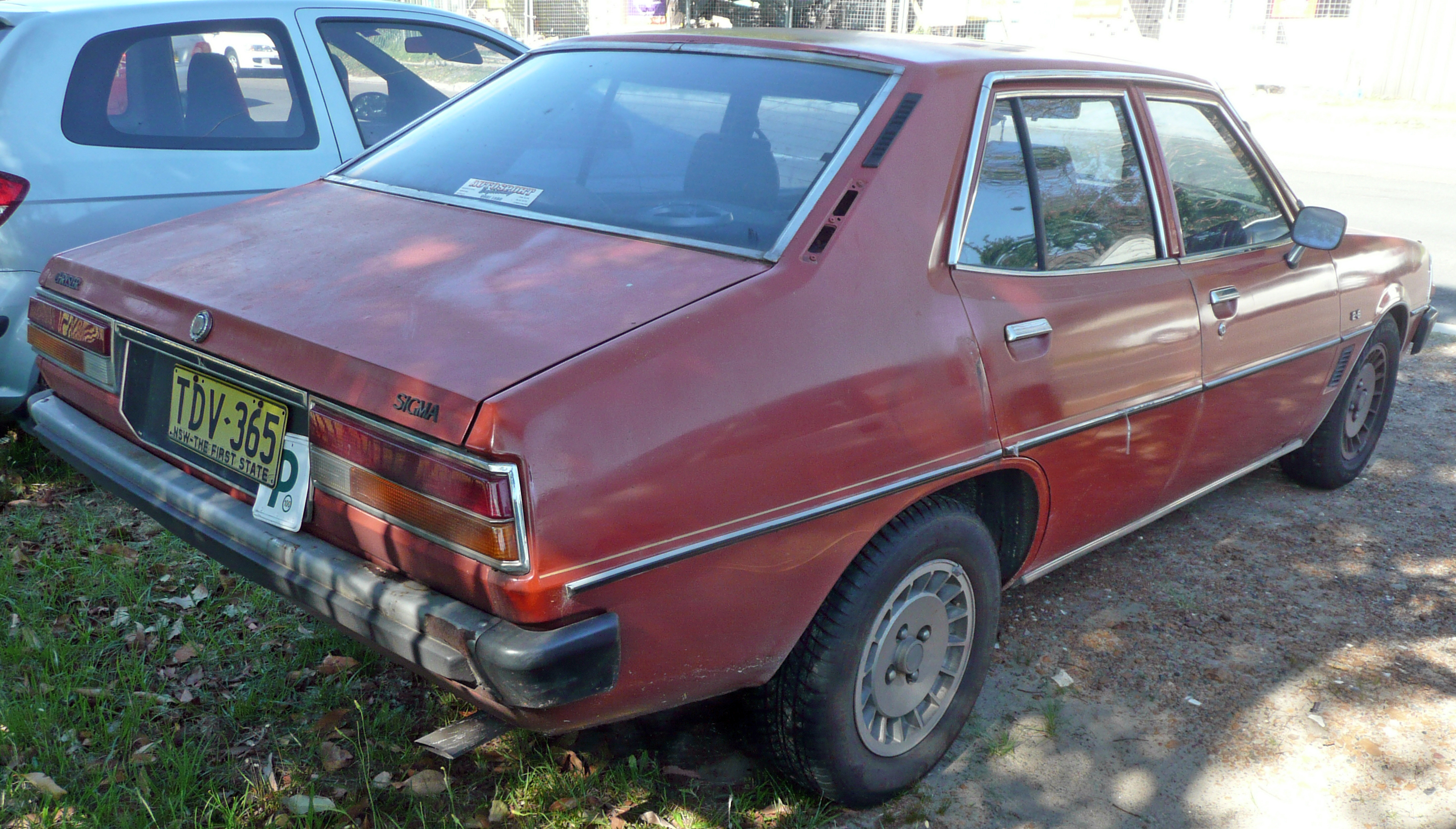
Chrysler Sigma (GE) SE 2.6 sedan

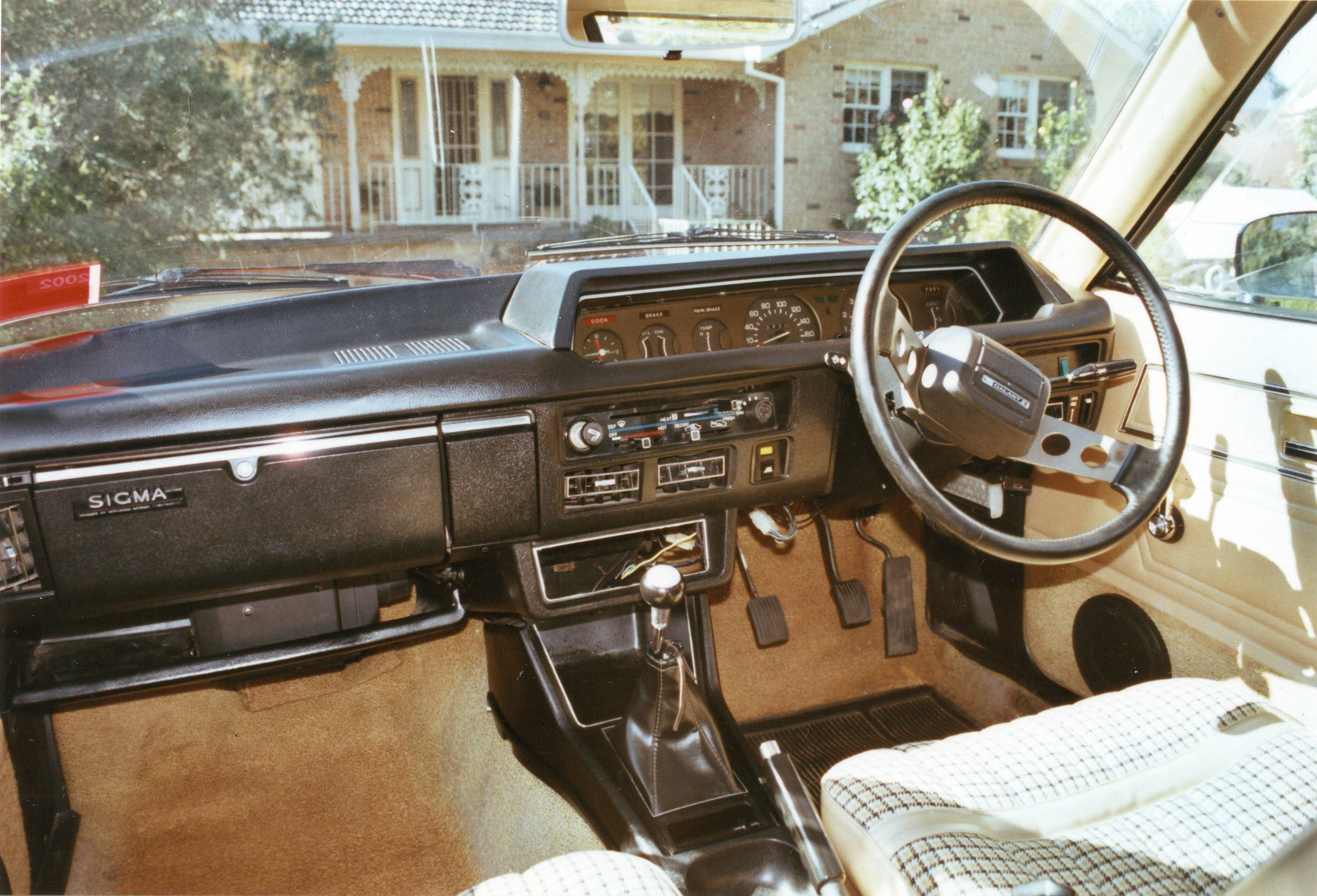
Interior, Chrysler Sigma (GE) GL Sportspack sedan

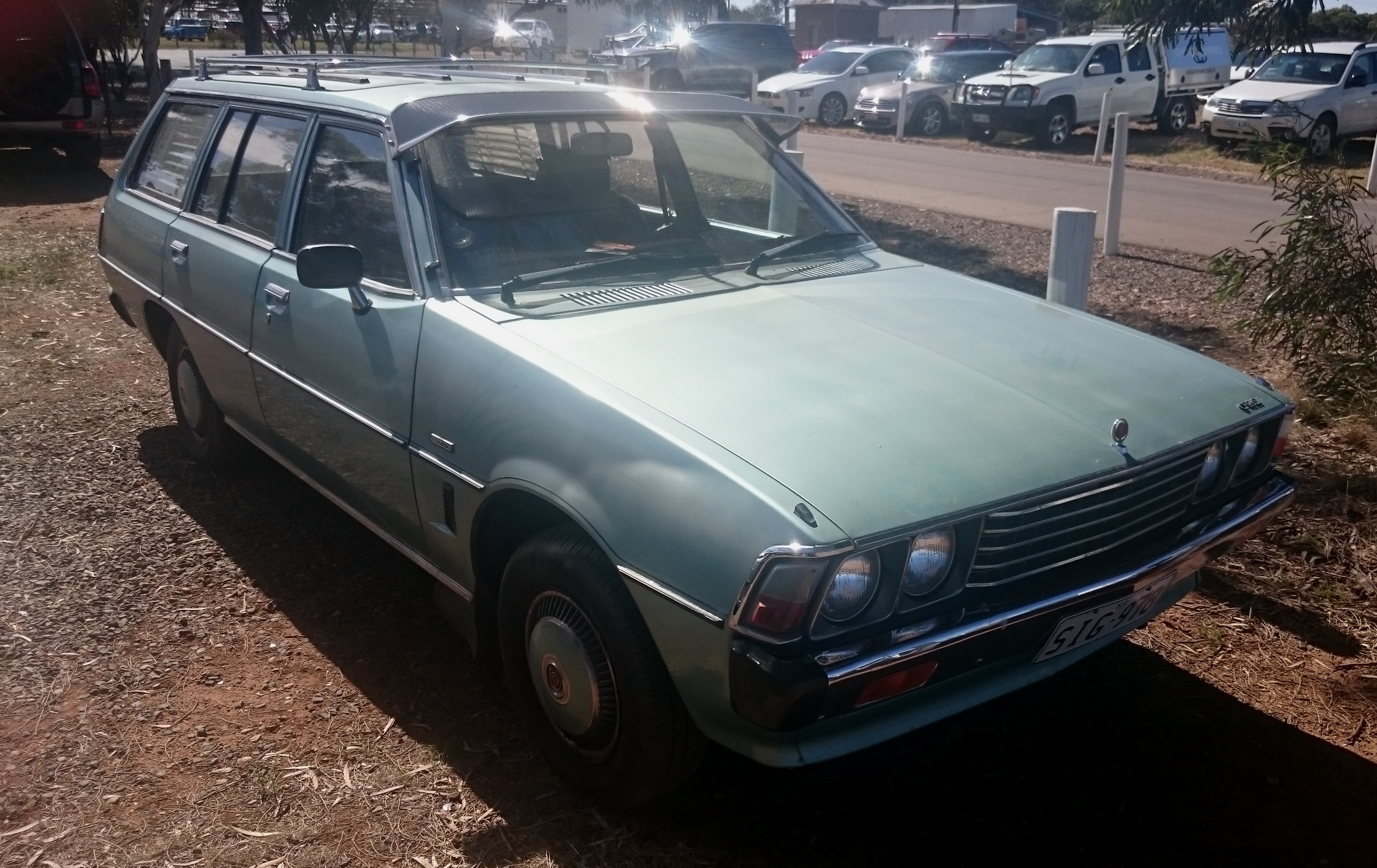
Chrysler Sigma SE Wagon (GE)

=== GH (1980–1982) ===
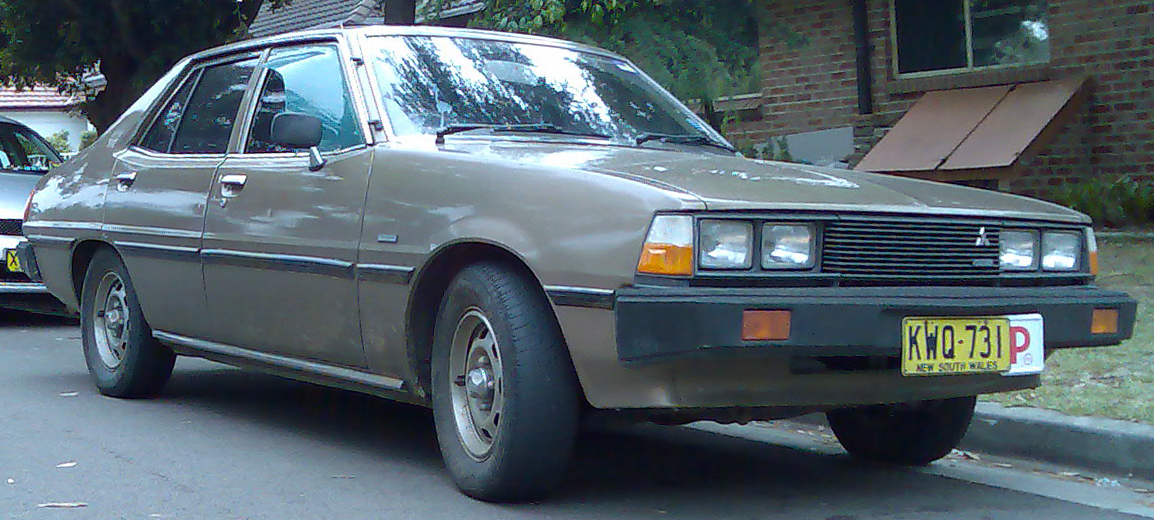
Mitsubishi Sigma (GH) GL sedan

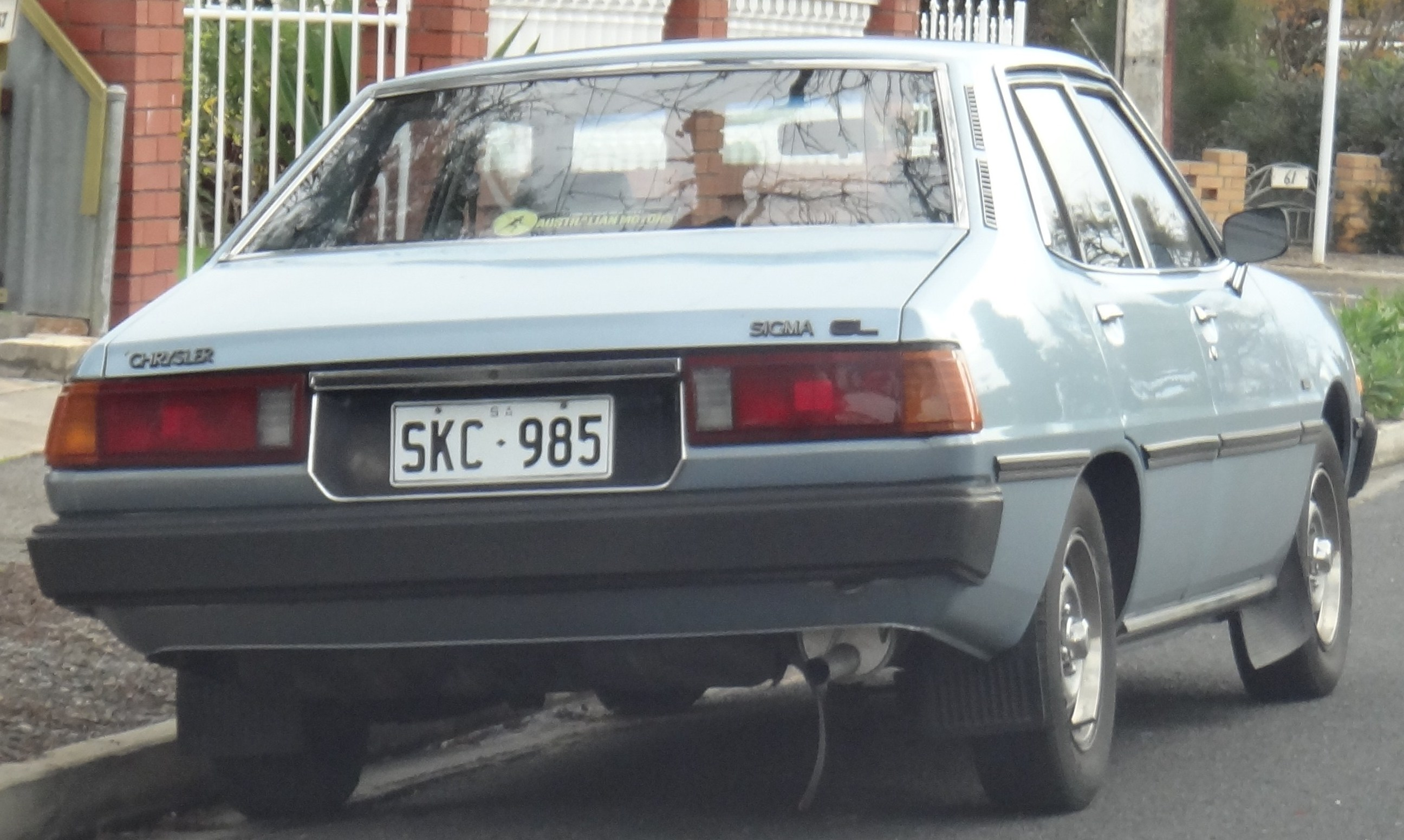
Chrysler Sigma (GH) GL sedan

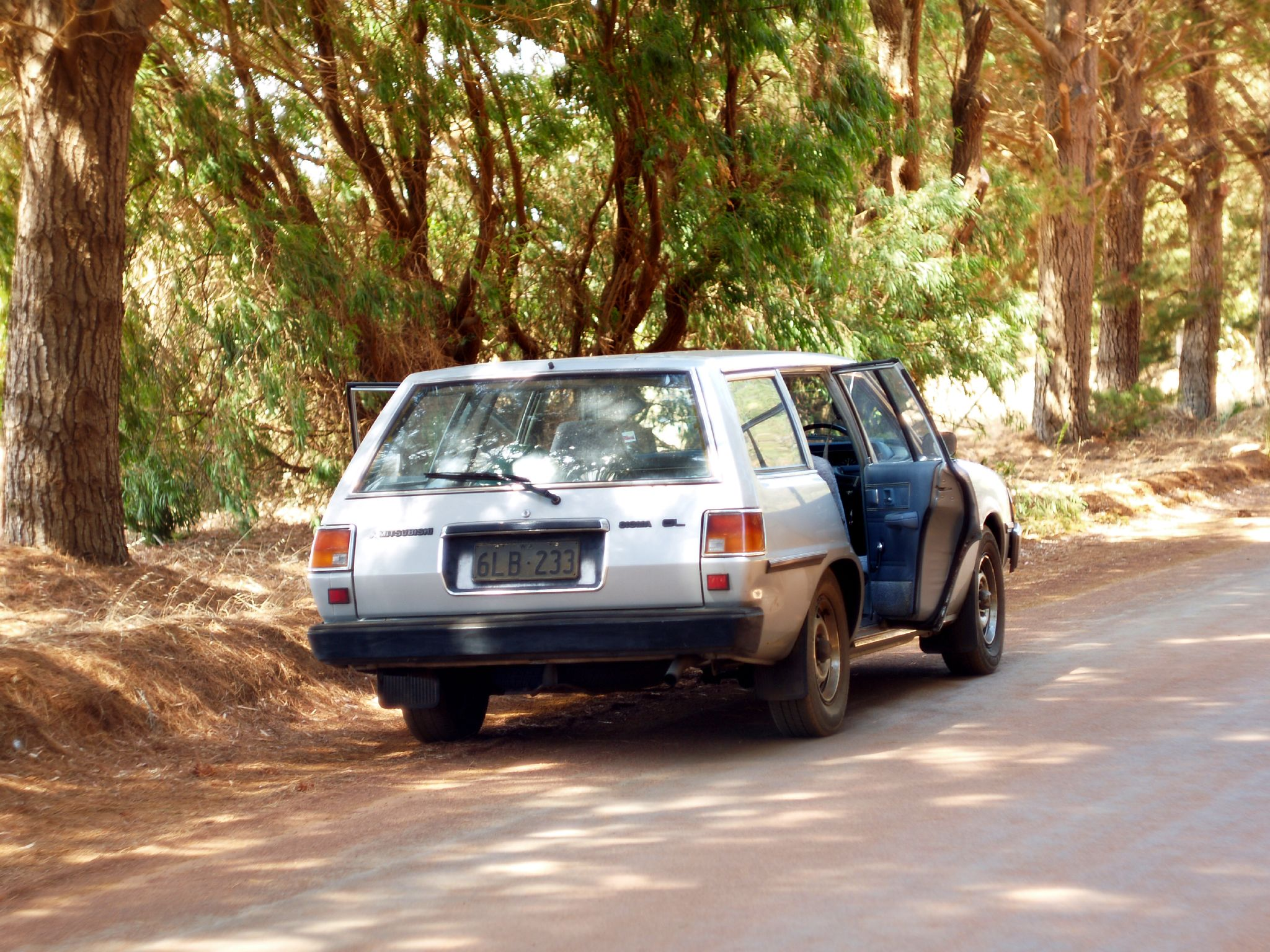
Mitsubishi Sigma (GH) GL wagon

On 28 April 1980, Chrysler unveiled the GH Sigma in Brisbane. Then on 30 April, Mitsubishi Corporation and Mitsubishi Motors jointly acquired Chrysler's remaining 65 percent share of Chrysler Australia (bringing the dual Mitsubishi ownership to 98.9 percent). On 1 October 1980, the GH range was rebadged from Chrysler Sigma to Mitsubishi Sigma, due to the renaming of Chrysler Australia to Mitsubishi Motors Australia (MMAL) following the buy-out.

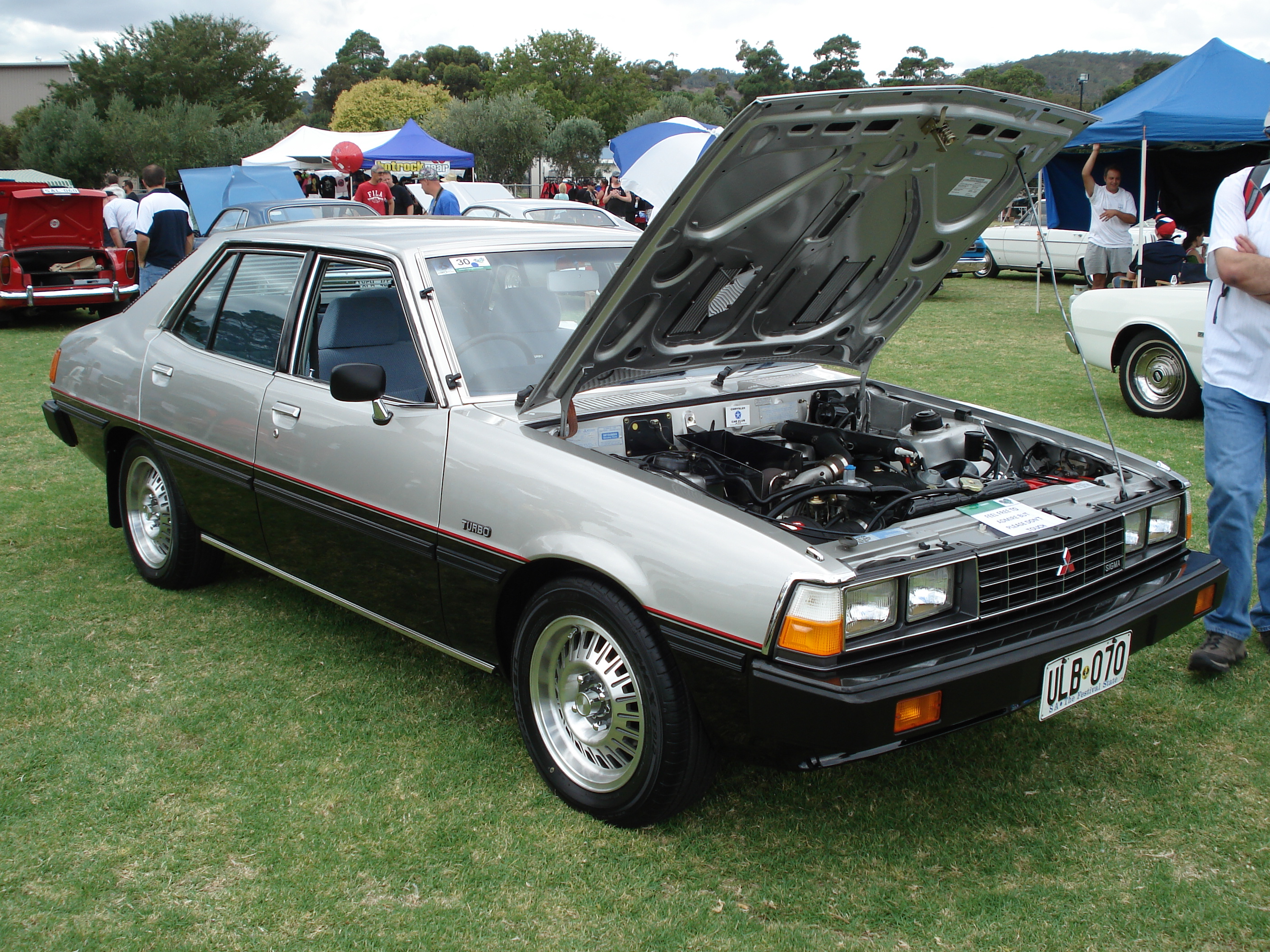
Mitsubishi Sigma (GH) Turbo

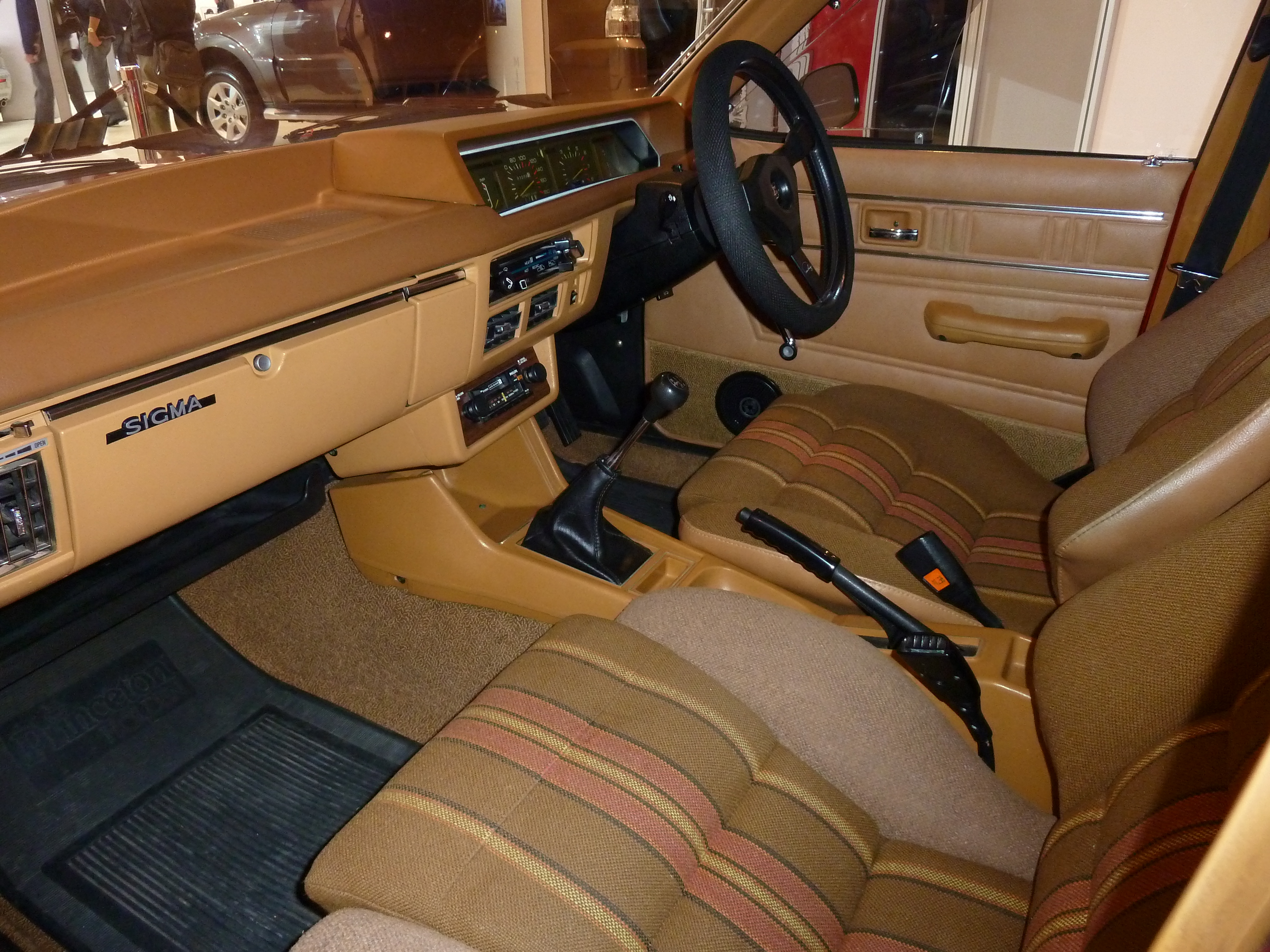
Interior, Mitsubishi Sigma (GH) GLX Peter Wherrett

Released to the market on 12 May, the GH series saw a considerable facelift on both front and rear ends. While it was only introduced to Australia in 1980, the facelift actually appeared on the Japanese home market Galant models and on New Zealand assembled Mitsubishi Sigma models in 1979.

The mechanical layout was as before except for addition of a five-speed manual for the 2.6-litre model (with automatic exiled to the options list). The base model was now simply called "Sigma" instead of "Sigma Galant".

A GLX model was placed between GL and SE level and was advertised as a "sports pack". A limited run of 1,016 "Peter Wherrett" editions of the GLX were built (option A05), named after Australian motoring journalist Peter Wherrett who was given the task of improving the handling of the Sigma by MMAL after complaining about it. The improvements included 15-inch Globe "Montego" alloy wheels fitted with Pirelli P6 tyres, Recaro seats, Momo steering wheel, Sonic extractors, as well as lowered coil springs and Bilstein shock absorbers.

Mitsubishi released a limited edition, GL-based Sigma Satellite in c. April 1981, adding two-tone paint (available in three combinations), unique hubcaps, a soft grip sports steering wheel, cloth upholstery, full tinted glass including laminated windscreen. In September 1981, in partnership with turbocharger specialists Normalair-Garrett, Mitsubishi produced a limited run of 500 Sigma Turbos, the first Australian-built turbocharged production car. The forced-induction 2.0-litre Astron powerplant produced 116 kW (156 hp) and 235 N⋅m (173 lb⋅ft). Mitsubishi discontinued the GH series in February 1982.

== Second generation ==
=== GJ (1982–1984) ===
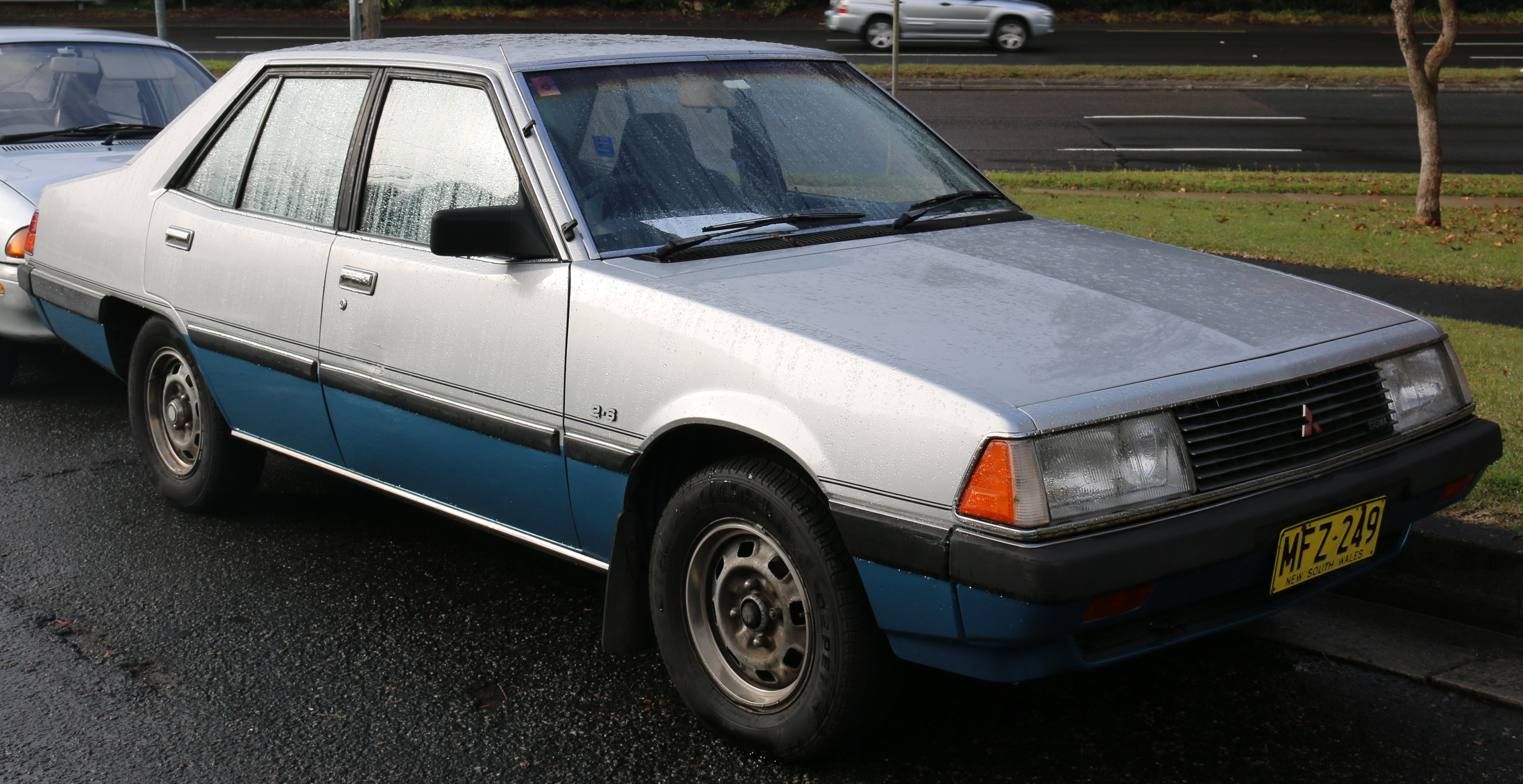
Mitsubishi Sigma (GJ) GL Satellite sedan

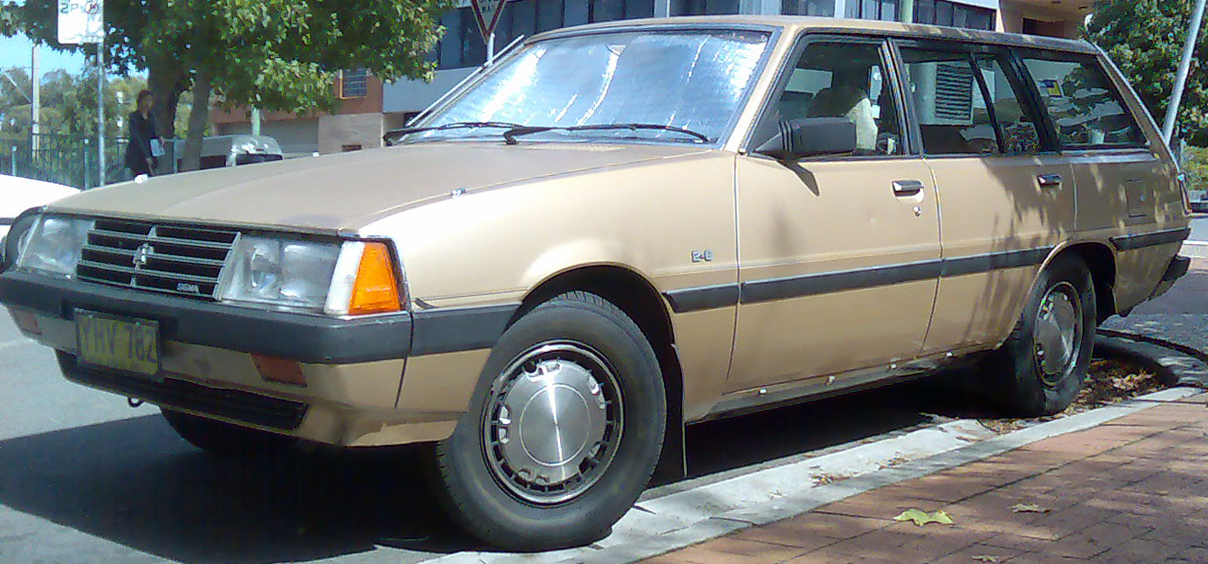
Mitsubishi Sigma (GJ) SE station wagon

The redesigned GJ Sigma was released in March 1982, based on the 1980 Japanese domestic market Mitsubishi Galant. While a complete redevelopment was done for the sedan models, the wagon models in fact were new only from the firewall forward—the rest of the bodyshell was still GH based. Engine and transmission offerings remained as before, but received power and torque boosts; the 2.0-litre now produced 70 kW (94 hp) and 152 N⋅m (112 lb⋅ft) and the 2.6-litre 76 kW (102 hp) and 192 N⋅m (142 lb⋅ft).

In February 1983, Mitsubishi launched a special edition Sigma GL Satellite. Priced $1,000 below the GL luxury level, the Satellite was built in sedan and wagon versions, with air conditioning, five-speed manual or automatic transmission all as options. However, two-tone paintwork, a laminated windscreen, AM/FM radio, adjustable steering column, intermittent windscreen wipers and a heated rear window were fitted as standard equipment.

The SE model featured cut pile carpets, a tachometer, overhead reading lamps, door step lamps, rear footwell lamps, four-speaker AM/FM/MPX stereo radio/cassette system, remote boot and fuel cap releases, adjustable lumbar support and tilt for the driver seat, and tinted side windows.

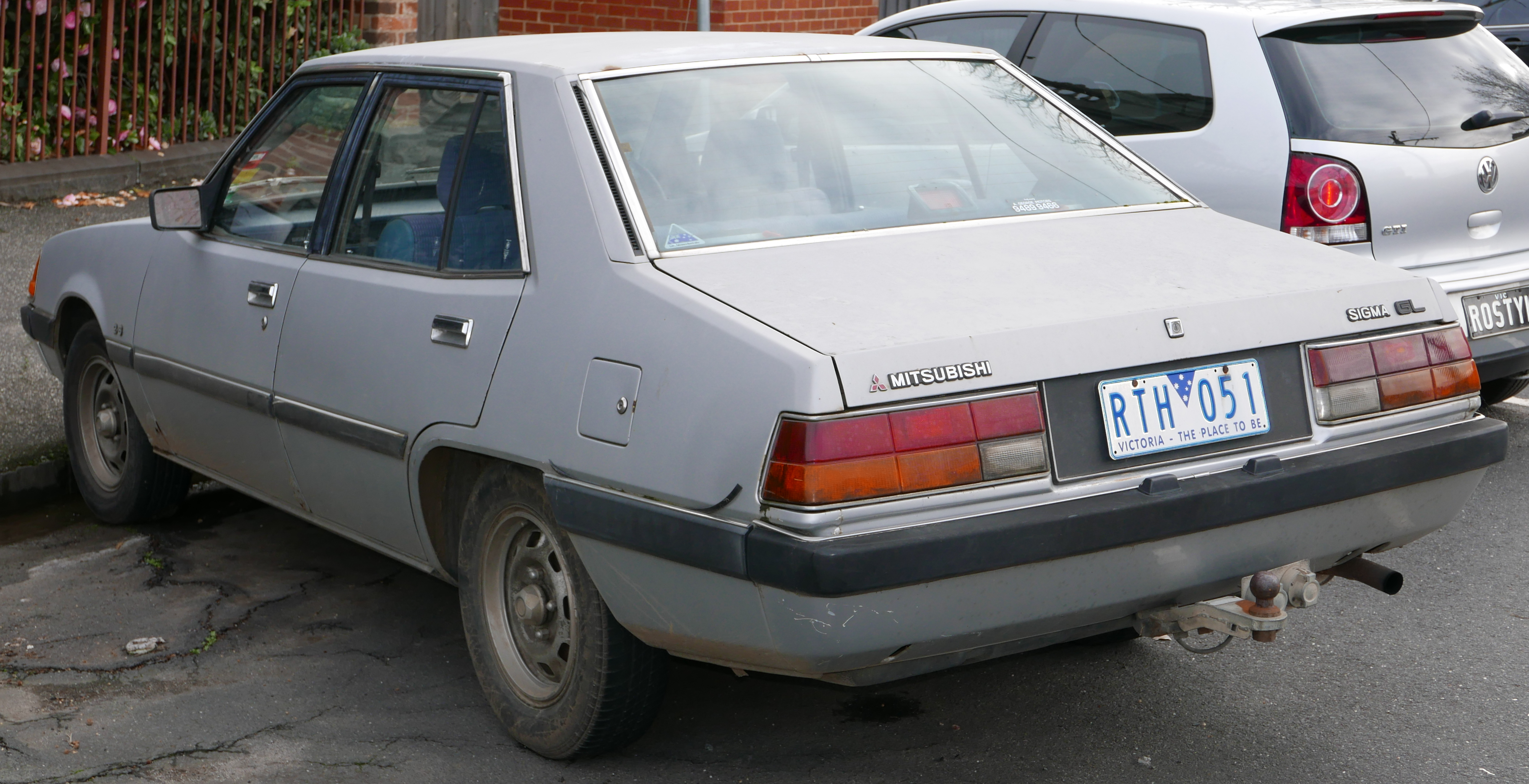
Mitsubishi Sigma (GJ) GL sedan

A sporting model, the Sigma GSR, was also released with either 2.0 or 2.6-litre engines offered with either automatic or manual transmissions. Features included alloy wheels, four-wheel disc brakes, a sports steering wheel and blackouts, particularly on the window frames and doorhandles.

June 1983 saw the entry-level Sigma rebadged as the Sigma XL, to coincide with the trim level designations on MMAL's small car, the Colt.

October 1983 saw the release of the luxurious, Sigma Super Saloon. Produced as a limited edition of 500 cars and placed above the SE trim level from which it derives, it came only with the 2.6-litre in either five-speed manual or three-speed automatic. The five-speed manual fitted was of Japanese origin, rather than the BorgWarner Australia unit previously fitted to Sigmas, and the suspension received a re-tune. The Super Saloon featured two-tone metallic paint and crushed velour upholstery for the interior. Two paint and trim combinations were offered—blue upper body with silver lower body and blue interior—or dark brown/light brown exterior with a bronze interior. The Super Saloon introduced standard power steering, power windows and central locking—features that also became optional on Sigma GL, SE, and GSR trims. The central floor console was also revised to accommodate the power window and central door locking switches. Other equipment fitted to the Super Saloon included air conditioning, alloy wheels, and four-wheel disc brakes.

The GJ series Sigma had the distinction of being the only Australian car during the 1980s to be exported to Europe (Chrysler previously did this with the Australian Valiant). The car was sold in the United Kingdom, in both sedan and wagon models, under the marque Lonsdale.

=== GK (1984–1985) ===
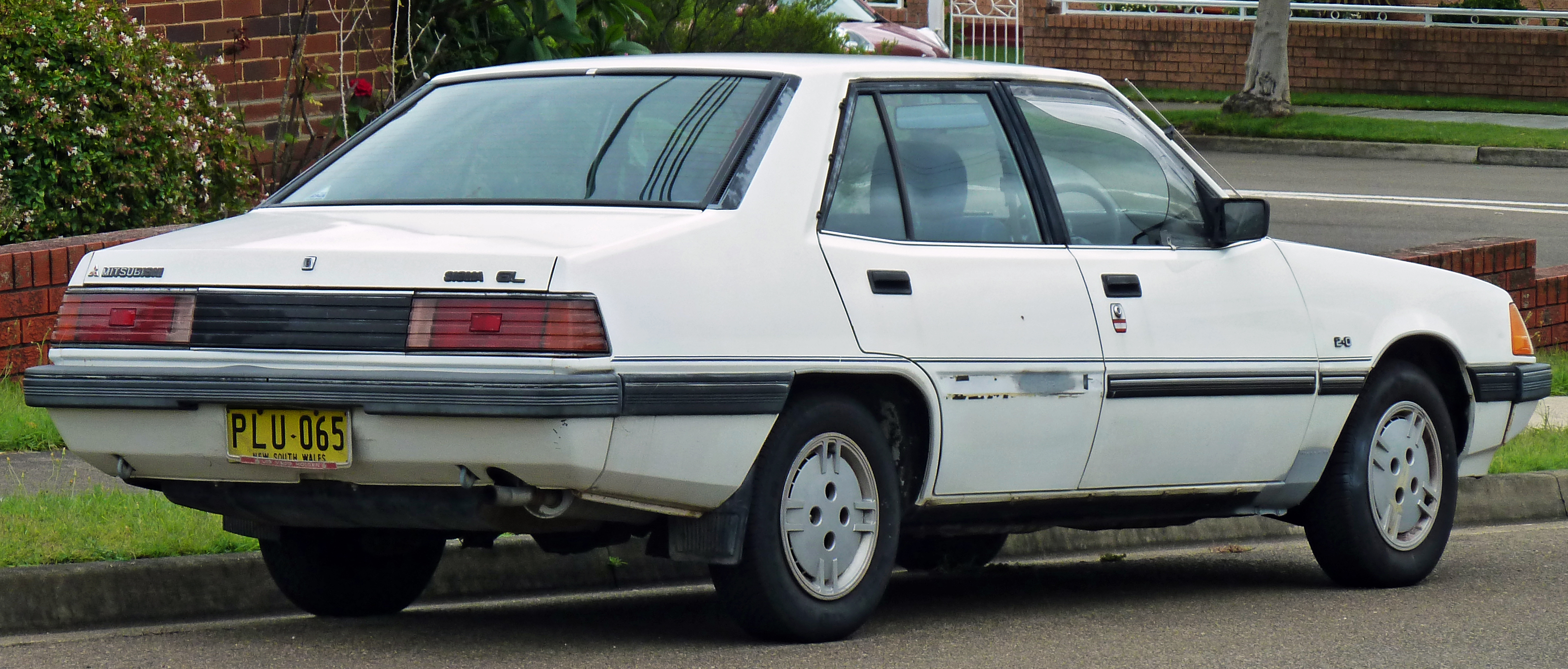
Mitsubishi Sigma (GK) GL sedan

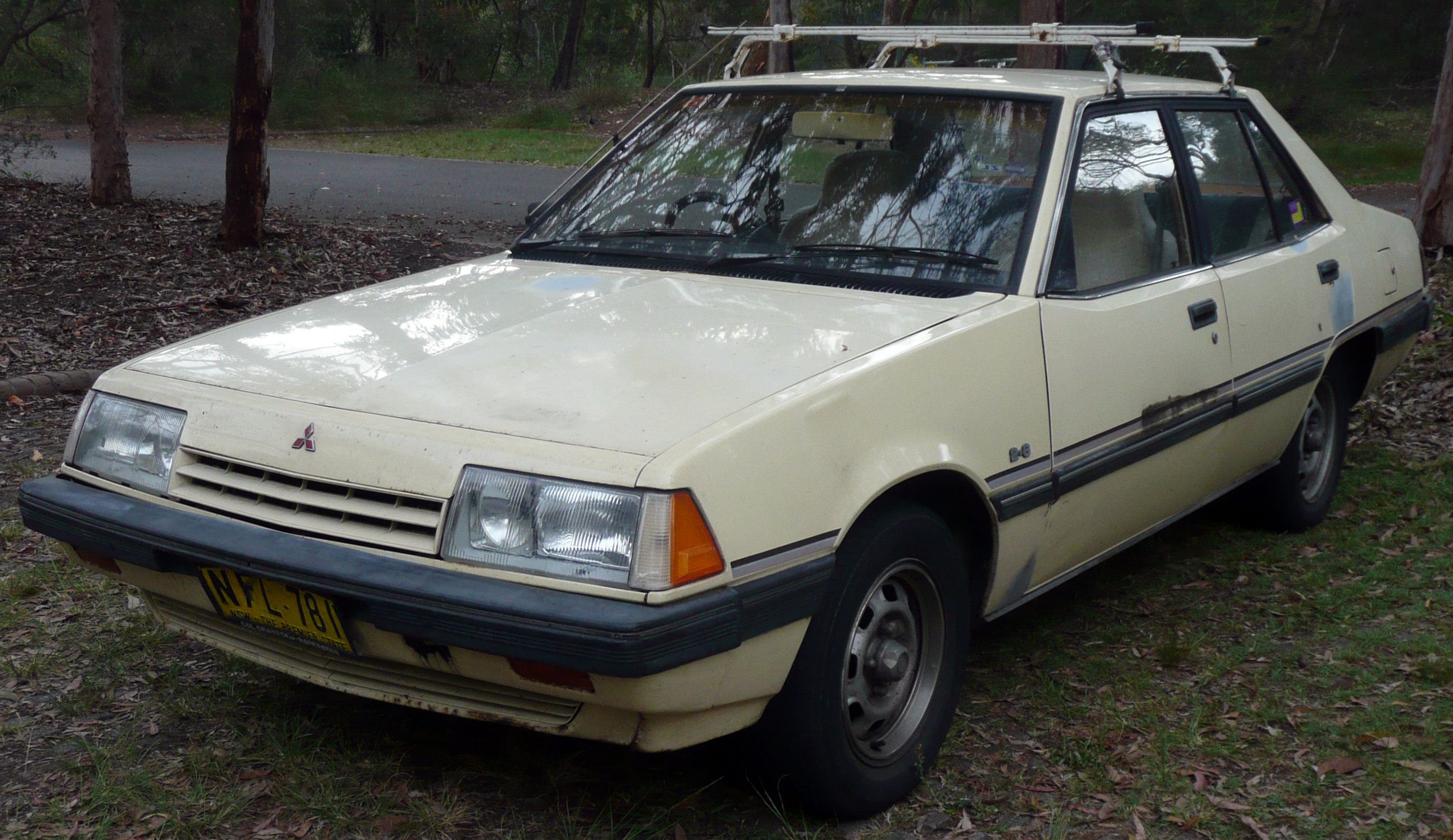
Mitsubishi Sigma (GK) Satellite sedan

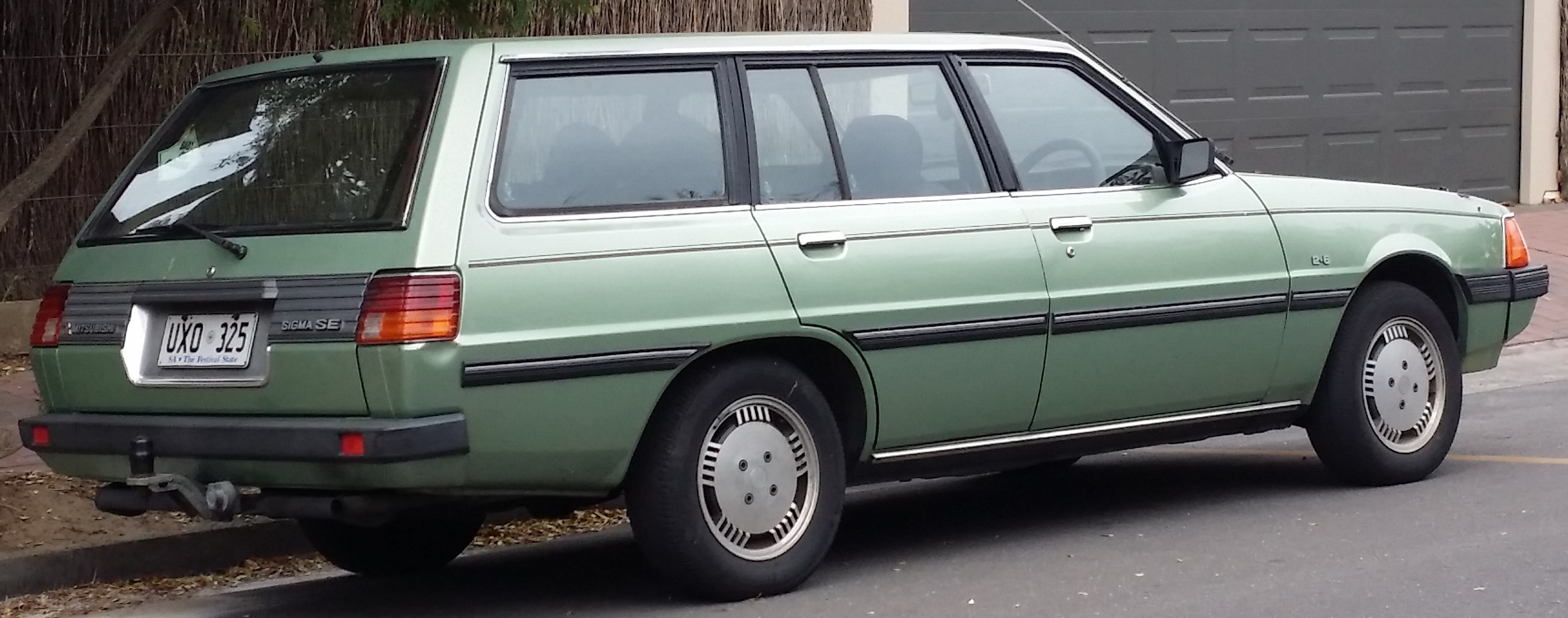
Mitsubishi Sigma (GK) SE station wagon

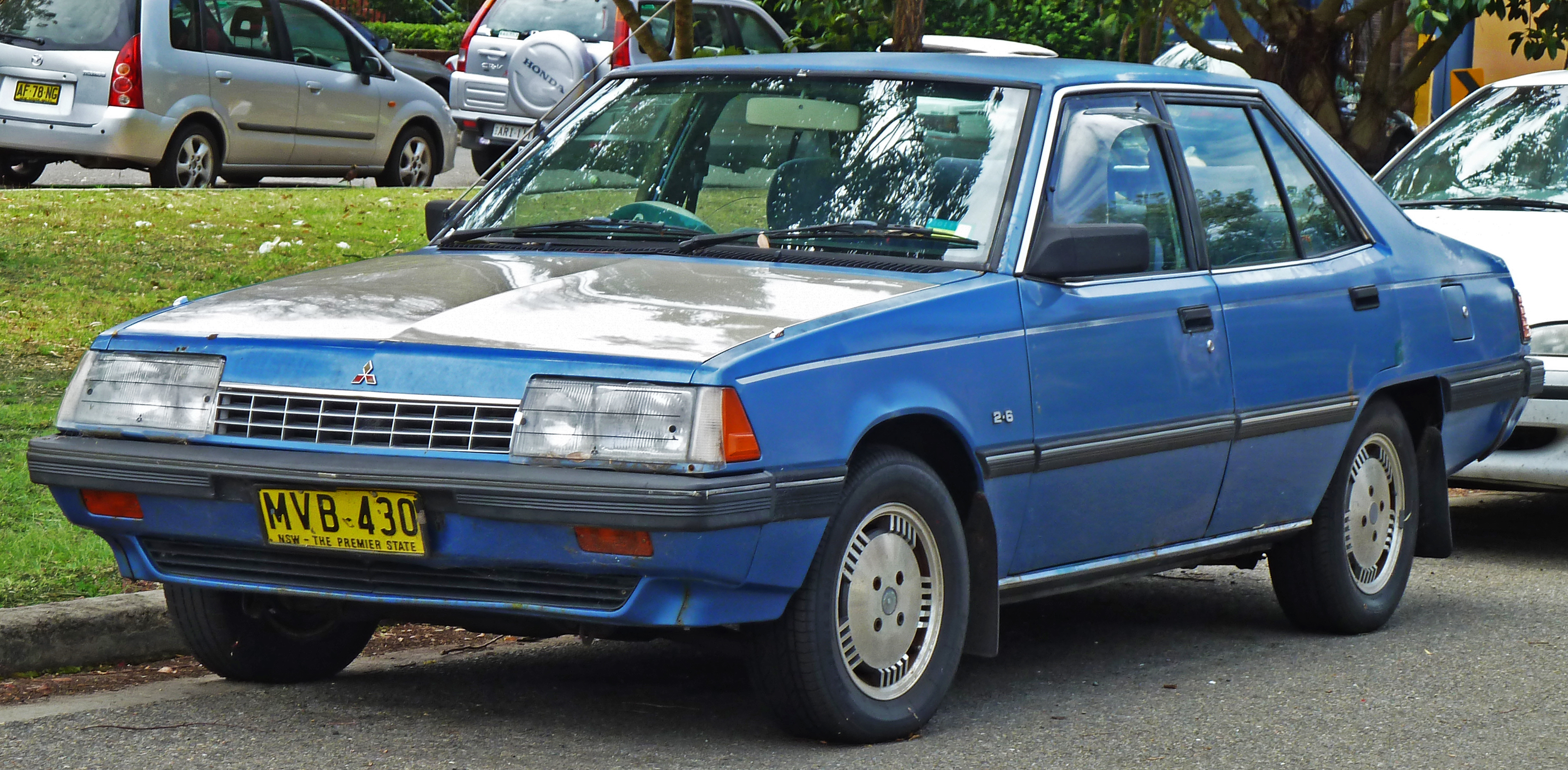
Mitsubishi Sigma (GK) SE sedan

The GK Series was released in March 1984. It was a comprehensive facelift, both outside and in. Externally the GK was changed by having a new bonnet and a shallower grille, while at the rear new taillight clusters (which had actually appeared in certain overseas markets in 1982) and rear valance were fitted, the registration plate being relocated below the bumper. Internally the specifications and trim of the models had changed. Seats were different in certain models, particularly the GL, and all models had the option of power windows (although rare), an option not available in most previous models.

The Sigma XL was the entry-level model of the range and came with either the 1.6 or 2.0-litre engines. In the SE, velour seats with lumbar control, adjustable headrests and a fold-down rear seat armrest with boot access were fitted. Reading lights incorporated into the roof-mounted dome light and built into the rear pillars were now a stock feature on the SE model Sigma. Power assisted steering was also an option along with electric windows. The SE model Sigma had stock dual line striping around the car, with chrome bonnet indicators.

Chrome detailing (around gauges and air vents, which often had a tendency to peel off) was replaced by black painting, and the door trim was now two-tone in certain models. A few other slight changes were included in the GK Sigma, for example, the boot was fully lined with carpet and also featured a plastic protector for the lights. A painted boot with only base carpet was used in the GN Sigma, with no plastic light protector. Also, red courtesy lights were built into the bottom of the doors on the SE model.

As for the mechanics of the car, the GK was unchanged from the GJ, while the SE model featured rear disc brakes as standard. The GSR received a sportier front air dam, rear spoiler and 15-inch alloy wheels and was only available with the 2.6-litre engine and five-speed manual transmission. The GSR Sigma also had a sports steering wheel, black door frames and door handles and came standard with rear disc brakes.

In July 1984, Mitsubishi reintroduced the Super Saloon trim level, again based on the Sigma SE sedan and incorporating luxury items normally offered as options. The GK Super Saloon generally followed the GJ's structure, although changes included new corduroy trim and stereo system with Compact Cassette facility, AM/FM scan tuning, and digital display. Mitsubishi also introduced a limited edition GK Sigma Satellite in late 1984, based on the XL but with the 2.6-litre engine and five-speed manual (or automatic optional), side stripes with Satellite badge identification, cloth-trimmed upholstery, AM/FM/MPX radio with dual speakers, distinguished wheel trim, additional silencing, tinted windscreen, and heated rear window.

=== GN (1985–1987) ===
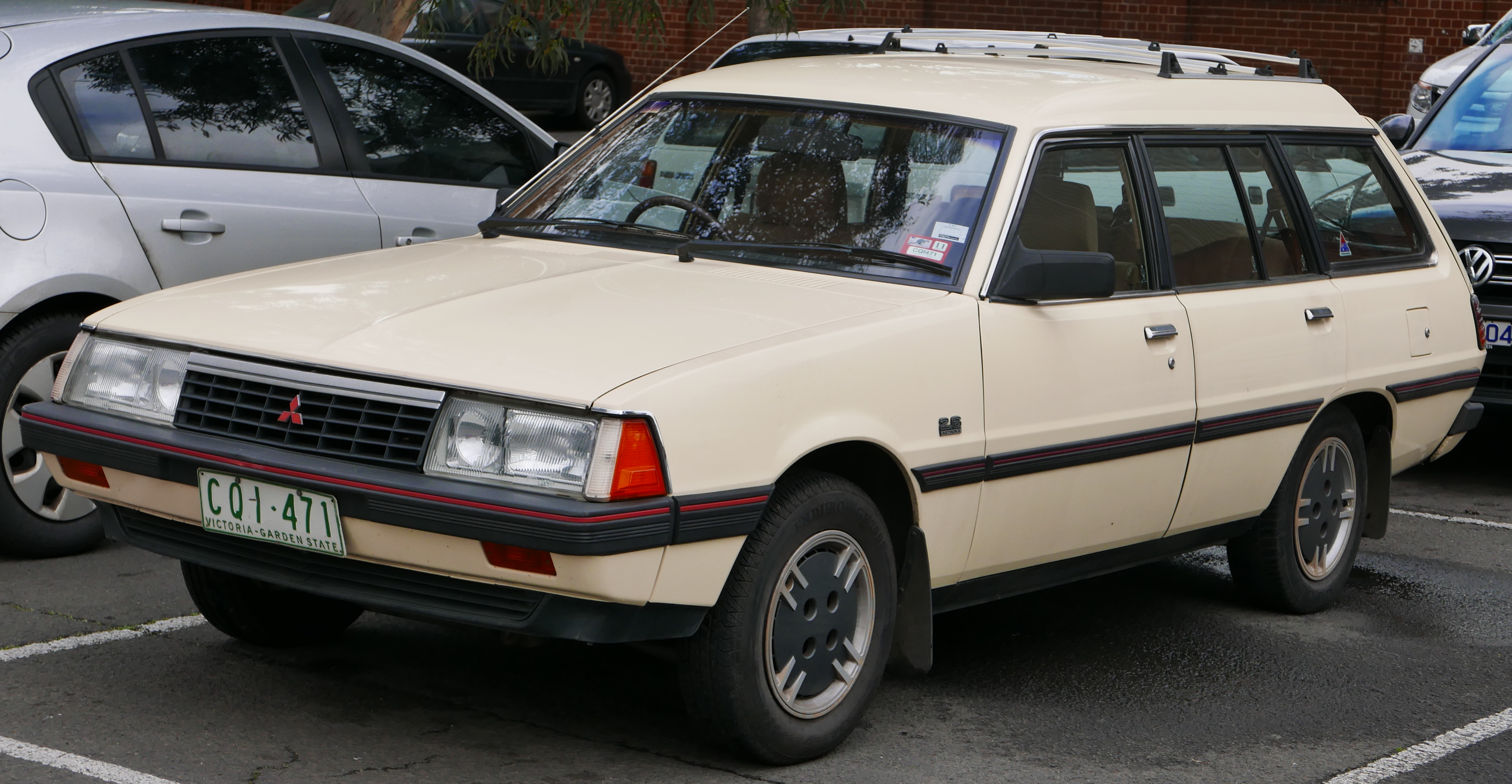
Mitsubishi Sigma (GN) GL wagon

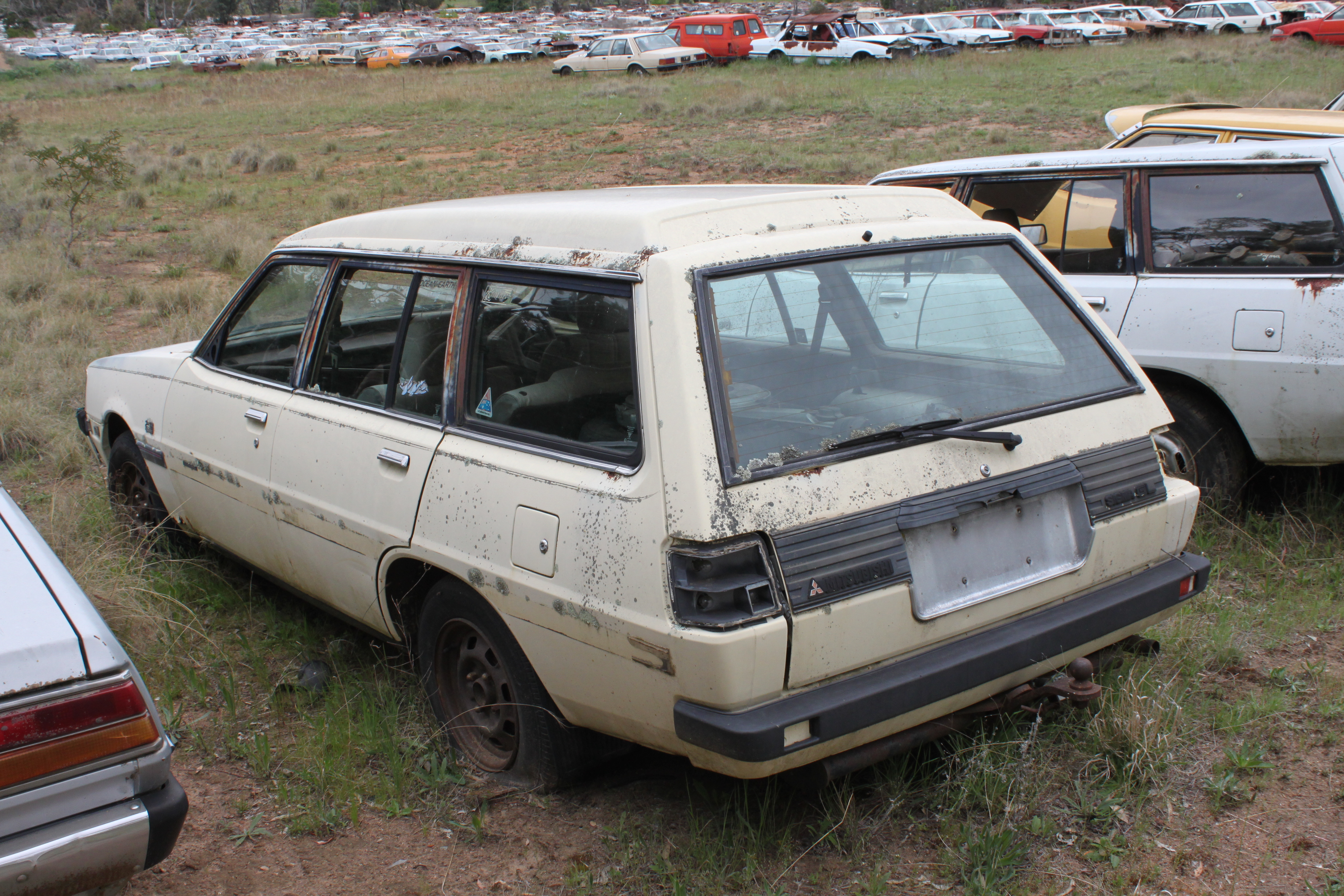
Mitsubishi Sigma (GN) GL wagon

Released in July 1985, the GN was an update, but also a rationalization of the previous Sigma range due to only being offered in GL trim. The range was rationalized due to the April 1985 release of the Mitsubishi Magna front-wheel drive range, which was developed eventually to replace the Sigma in Australia.

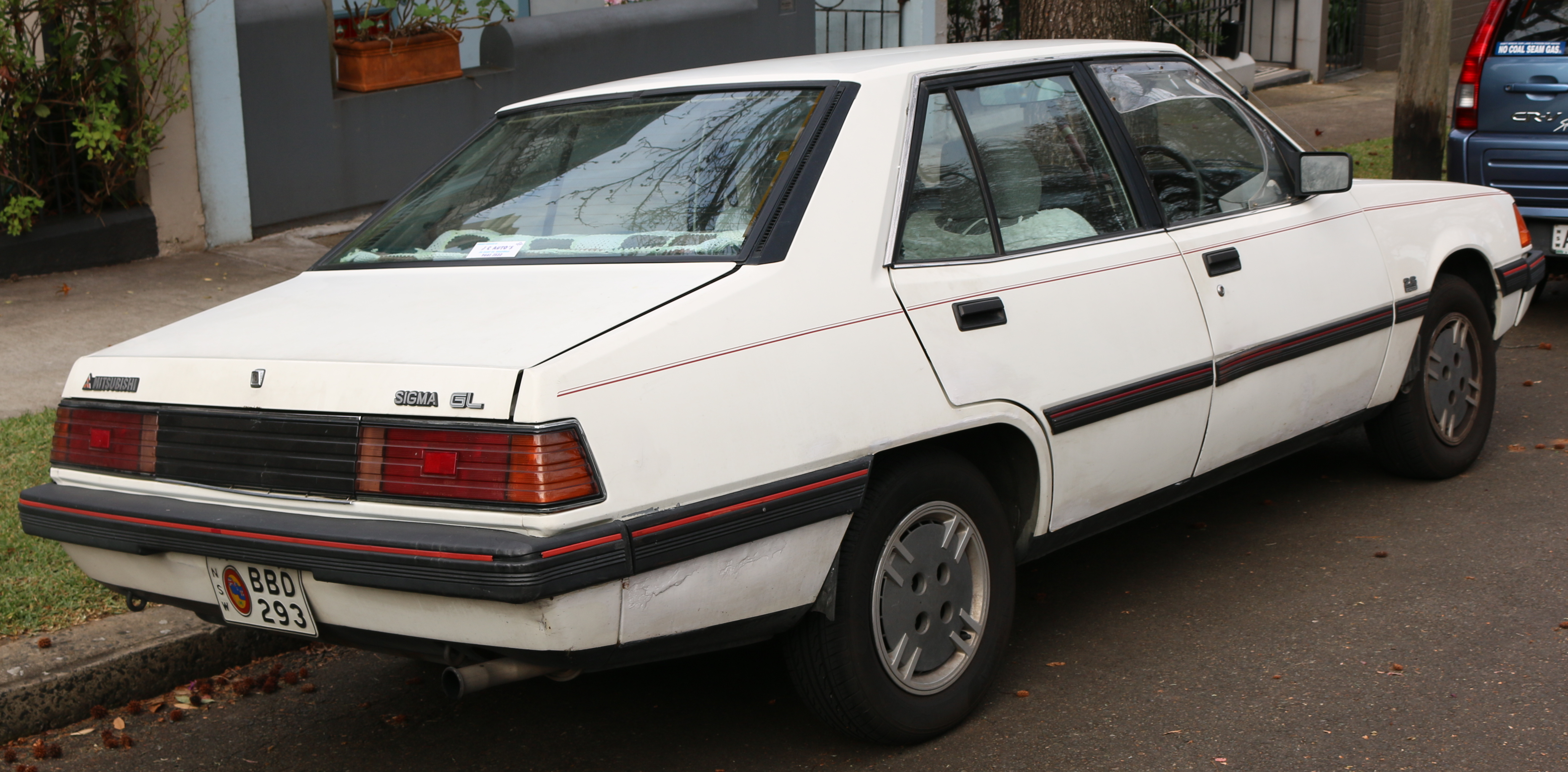
Mitsubishi Sigma (GN) GL sedan

The GN range had a number of external trim changes over its predecessors, notably a black trim line around the base of the body, and the deletion of the wrap-round chrome strip seen on the previous model. The grille was remodelled, resembling the SE grille of the previous model, and new hubcaps were used with alloy wheels from the previous SE models optional. The largest change however, concerned the wagon models. To freshen the model before the impending release of the Magna wagon (which was being developed at that time, for a 1987 release), a new higher roof (dubbed "high roof") was developed for the car, which helped to improve the car's overall cabin space. It gave the wagon a unique appearance from its predecessors, particularly as it incorporated a roof-mounted spoiler.

Engine-wise, the GN Sigma was offered either with the Astron 2.0-litre (70 kW (94 hp) at 5600 rpm and 152 N⋅m (112 lb⋅ft) at 2400 rpm) or the Astron II 2.6-litre (83 kW (111 hp) at 5200 rpm and 200 N⋅m (150 lb⋅ft) at 2400 rpm) units. The Astron II had a few changes over the previous models, notably a newly designed head with hydraulic tappets (replacing the manual tappets in previous Astrons) and flat-top pistons. The oil pressure switch was now located at the rear of the cylinder block. In December 1985, the 2.0-litre versions were dropped, as Mitsubishi did not believe it warranted the conversion to unleaded fuel. Unleaded was introduced in Australia in January 1986.

Mitsubishi launched GL Satellite limited editions of the GN series in c. October 1986, adding air conditioning, unique striping, headlamp protectors, front and rear mudflaps, tilt adjustable steering column, remote control tailgate (for wagons) and side mirrors.

The "high roof" Sigma wagon was an export model for MMAL. During 1986–1987 station wagons were shipped to New Zealand, due to that market's demand for wagon models. Although they were of a previous generation to the front-wheel drive Mitsubishi Sigma sedan (which was similar, but of a narrower bodyshell to the Magna, and fitted with smaller engines) range being sold in New Zealand, they proved popular, particularly with fleets.

This final generation of the Sigma ceased production in early 1987, due to the release of the Magna wagon models, completing the overall Magna range.
