= Lonsdale (car) =

Defunct automotive subsidiary of Mitsubishi Motors (1982-1983)

Lonsdale YD
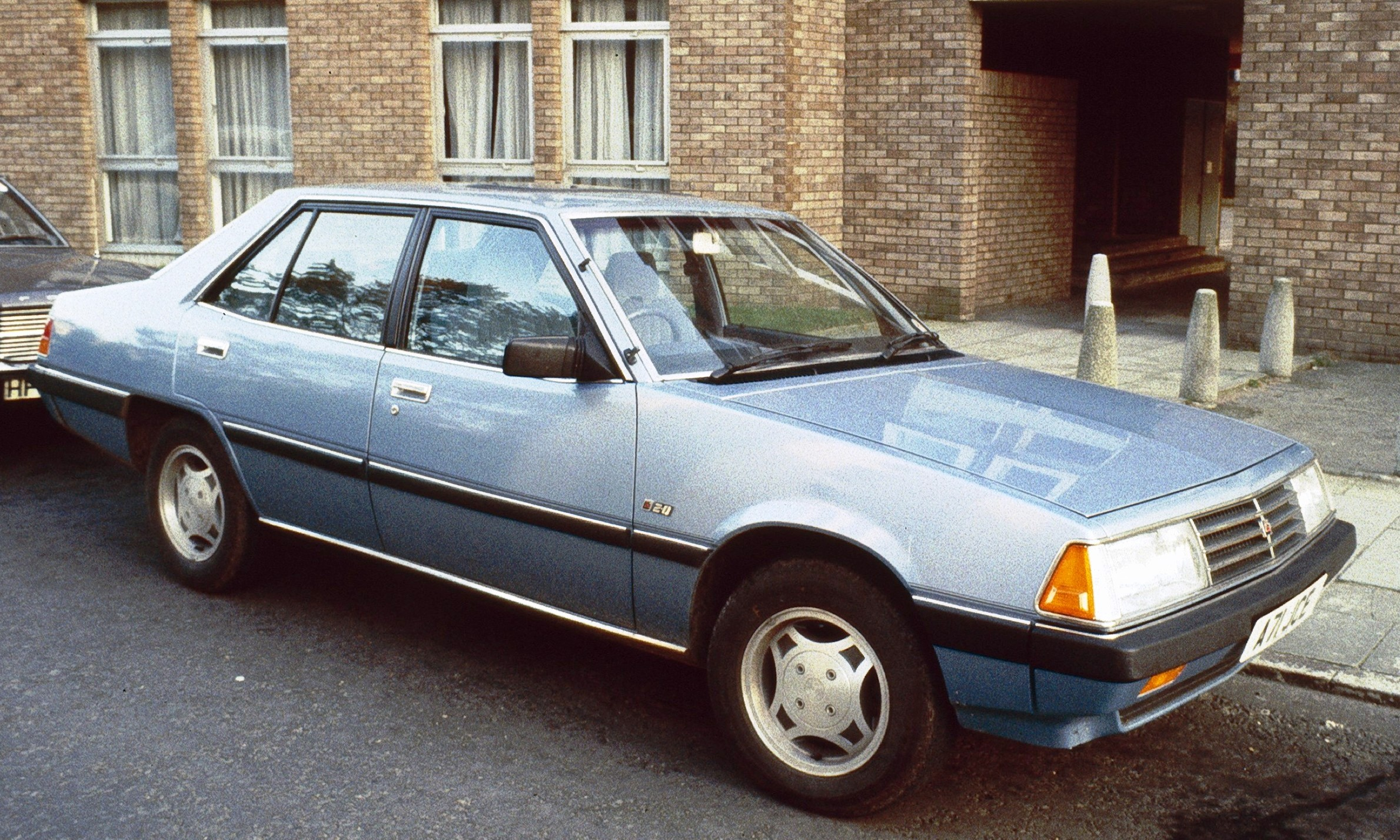
- Lonsdale YD41

Overview
- Also called: Mitsubishi Galant; Mitsubishi Eterna; Mitsubishi Sigma (GJ)
- Production: 1983–1984
- Assembly: Australia: Tonsley Park, South Australia

Body and chassis
- Class: Compact
- Body style: 4-door saloon 5-door estate
- Layout: FR layout

Powertrain
- Engine: 1.6 L I4 (81 PS / 60 kW); 2.0 L I4 (95 PS / 70 kW); 2.6 L I4 (103 PS / 76 kW)

Lonsdale was a marque of car sold in the United Kingdom by the Colt Car Company between 1983 and 1984. It took its name from the industrial suburb of Lonsdale in Adelaide, South Australia, where Mitsubishi Australia had an engine production facility. The only car sold under this brand was the Lonsdale, a badge engineered Mitsubishi Sigma (GJ). It was sold as the Lonsdale YD41 and the Lonsdale YD45. Around 700 were produced.

The car was powered by one of three four cylinder engines of 1.6, 2.0 and 2.6 litres, producing respectively 81, 95 and 103 bhp.

The largest of these power units produced a maximum torque of 192 Nm., and was one of the largest post-war four cylinder engines produced.

Although the Sigma was merely an Australian version of Mitsubishi Motors' Colt Galant which was already available in the UK, the company's plan was to circumvent the "gentlemen's agreement", a voluntary import quota which limited Japanese-manufactured imports to 11 per cent of the market (which typically amounted to fewer than 200,000 cars per year). At the time of launch, 70 dealers were tasked with selling 3,500 Lonsdales in the remainder of 1983, and then 12,000 in 1984. These targets were never met.

The Colt Car Company continued to sell the vehicle in the UK for 1984, although rebranded as the Mitsubishi Galant.

== See also ==
- List of car manufacturers of the United Kingdom
