= Healthy, Wealthy and Wise =

- Genre: Lifestyle
- Created by: Michael Dickinson; Gavan Disney
- Presented by: Ronnie Burns (S1-7); Jacki MacDonald (S1); Felicity Kennett (S6 & 7); Chrissie Swan (S8); Melissa Leong (S9-)
- Country of origin: Australia
- Original language: English
- No. of seasons: 8
- No. of episodes: 250+

Production
- Executive producer: Gavan Disney (seasons 1–7)
- Producer: Michael Dickinson (seasons 1–7)
- Running time: 60 minutes
- Production companies: Disney Entertainment P/L (seasons 1–7); WFTN (series 8-)

Original release
- Network: Network Ten
- Release: 3 February 1992 – 23 November 1998
- Network: Seven Network
- Release: 27 September – 15 November 2025
- Network: Network 10
- Release: 7 November 2026

Healthy, Wealthy and Wise is an Australian lifestyle television program. It was originally broadcast on Network Ten from 1992 until 1998. The show was created and produced by Michael Dickinson. Gavan Disney, once the producer of the Nine Network's long-running variety show Hey Hey it's Saturday, served as executive producer and the show was packaged by Disney Entertainment P/L for the Ten Network and its affiliates throughout the world.

In November 2024, it was announced that the Seven Network would broadcast a reboot of the series in 2025. It premiered on 27 September 2025. In 2026, the series was picked up by 10 after only one season on Seven, with new host Melissa Leong and will premiere on 7 November 2026.

== Title ==
The title takes its name from the proverb, "Early to bed and early to rise, makes a man healthy, wealthy, and wise." This quote is often attributed to Benjamin Franklin since it appeared in his Poor Richard's Almanack; however, it was first used in print by John Clarke in a 1639 book of English and Latin proverbs.

== Cast ==
Notable people associated with the program included Felicity Kennett, wife of the then-Premier of Victoria Jeff Kennett, and Jim Brown, a former Ten eyewitness news journalist. Jacki MacDonald, who formerly appeared on Disney's previous program Hey Hey it's Saturday, was a presenter during the first season.

Others used the opportunity to develop ongoing TV careers with the show as a starting point, including chef Iain Hewitson and crafts presenter Tonia Todman. The show's finance guru Ross Greenwood enjoyed particular success and became network finance editor on the Nine Network.

The rebooted series is hosted by Chrissie Swan.

=== Network Ten (1992–1998) ===
Some featured reporters and presenters on the show included:

- Jacki MacDonald – Presenter (season 1)
- Ronnie Burns – Host/presenter
- Felicity Kennett – Presenter (seasons 6 & 7)
- Jim Brown – Travel
- Ross Greenwood – Finance
- Iain Hewitson – Chef
- Tonia Todman – Crafts
- Peter Wherrett – Motoring (seasons 3–7)

=== Seven Network (2025) ===
The reporters and presenters were confirmed on 24 September 2025 including:

- Rachel Cole – Money
- Vincent ‘Dim Sim’ Lim – Food
- Chyka Keebaugh – Style
- Aimee Stanton – Home
- Adam Morris – Motoring
- Dr Mike Mrozinski – Health
- Dr Will Maginness – Pets
- Ash Wicks – Helpdesk

=== Network 10 (2026) ===
The following is reporters and presenters including:

- Gyton Grantley — Food
- Rachel Cole — Money
- Aimee Stanton — DIY
- Dr Mike Mrozinski — Health
- Chyka Keebaugh — Style
- Adam Morris — Motoring

== Episodes ==
=== Season Eight (2025) ===
No. in season	Title	Original release date	Australia viewers
1	"Episode 1"	27 September 2025	628,000
2	"Episode 2"	4 October 2025	303,000
3	"Episode 3"	11 October 2025	372,000
4	"Episode 4"	18 October 2025	276,000
5	"Episode 5"	25 October 2025	354,000
6	"Episode 6"	1 November 2025	329,000
7	"Episode 7"	8 November 2025	354,000
8	"Episode 8"	15 November 2025	344,000

== International broadcasts ==
The first seven series was also broadcast on television in the United Arab Emirates on Channel 33, on KTV2 in Kuwait, on Bahrain TV Channel 55 in Bahrain and on the Australia Television network in various countries across Asia and the Pacific Islands.
