= Gavan Disney =

- Born: Gavin Francis Disney; May 27, 1949
- Died: November 2, 2018 (aged 69)
- Occupations: Television producer, manager
- Known for: Executive producer Hey Hey Its Saturday; Healthy, Wealthy and Wise as co-creator
- Notable work: Manager of John Blackman, Molly Meldrum and others

Gavan Francis Disney (27 May 1949 – 6 November 2018) was an Australian television producer.

== Career ==
Disney was best known for being an executive producer of long-running Nine Network variety show Hey Hey It's Saturday and for being co-creator of Network Ten lifestyle program Healthy, Wealthy and Wise. Television personality Bert Newton credited Disney with resurrecting his career in the 1990s by recruiting him to host Network Ten morning show Good Morning Australia. Iain Hewitson also stated in an interview that Disney helped him getting a start in television by giving him life-changing career advice.

He also served as a manager for Hey Hey regular's John Blackman and Molly Meldrum and numerous other media personalities.

In 2009, a jury found Disney not guilty of ten counts of indecent assault and two counts of rape, after he was charged in 2008 with assaulting a 17-year-old employee while he was a senior executive at Ballarat television station BTV6 in the 1980s. The jury had previously been directed by the judge to find Disney not guilty of an additional three counts of indecent assault due to a lack of evidence.

Disney died at the age of 69 in November 2018, following a long illness.
