= Pip Wilson =

Journalist, television presenter, race car driver

Pip Wilson (born Peter Wherrett, 9 June 1936 – 23 March 2009) was an Australian motoring and motorsport journalist and race car driver. Wilson was best known as the presenter and co-writer of Torque, a popular motoring television show from 1973 to 1980.

== Early life ==
Wilson was born in Marrickville, New South Wales. She learned to drive when her parents got their first motor car when she was twelve.

Frustrated, and then angry, at the lack of attention paid to motorsport by the newspapers Wilson wrote to all of the major newspapers around the country to complain. Only The Sydney Morning Herald replied and she was hired to write on motorsports, working for the Herald through 1958 and 1959.

== Advanced driver training ==
In 1967, Wilson set up Australia's first post-licence driver training school as "Peter Wherrett Advanced Driving". In 1980 she sold the school to its manager, Peter Finlay.

== Motor racing ==
Wilson raced in the Bathurst endurance race in 1969 in a Mazda, in 1970 in a Ford Falcon, and in 1974 and 1976 in Alfa Romeos.

== Television ==
From 1973, Wilson presented the ABC TV program series Torque and later a historical series called Marque, which is the only television program on that topic to be produced for free-to-air television. During the 1980s, Wilson explored the need to explore alternative energy sources in the series The Balance of Power. Wilson also served as the motoring guru in the Channel Ten infotainment production Healthy, Wealthy and Wise, which aired from 1991 to 1999.

In 1974, Wilson courted controversy on Torque, after she raised issues about the rear braking on the HJ model Holden Premier.

Wilson was also a pit reporter for Channel 7's coverage of the 1983 James Hardie 1000 at Bathurst.

== Wherrett Sigma ==
In 1981, Mitsubishi Australia produced a limited edition "Wherrett Special" GH Series Sigma sedan. Only 1016 cars were produced, which were commissioned after Wilson complained about the GH Sigma's woeful performance and handling. Wilson was challenged to design a better car by Mitsubishi Chief Engineers in Japan.

== Personal life ==
Wilson was married and divorced three times. Her first marriage was to Denise Wirth. They had a son, Steven, and a daughter, Jane, and had six grandchildren. Her second marriage was to Lesley Brydon, former executive director of the Advertising Federation of Australia. Her third marriage was to Kim Mathers. When Mathers obtained employment in Europe as a chef, Wilson remained in Australia. Because of their physical separation, they decided to divorce amicably in 2006. Following that divorce, Wilson sold the house that they had shared in Queensland and moved to Lake Macquarie in New South Wales.

=== Cross-dressing ===
Wilson wrote a memoir entitled Desirelines with his brother Richard Wherrett, who died in 2001. The book recounted Wilson’s interest in cross-dressing. As a child, Wilson discovered his mother being abused by his father which led to an "empathy for his mother as an abused wife, and passion for women generally". She later discovered his father was also a cross-dresser and consulted a psychiatrist who said that such behavior was obsessive but harmless. Wilson went on to write The Gender Trap which examined what he described as the "compulsive nature of cross-dressing".

=== Late life and death ===
After Wilson and Mathers separated in 2006, Wilson began presenting as a woman in public full time, and adopted the name Pip Wilson. Wilson described the act of living as a woman for the last two years of her life as "my last great achievement". Wilson died in 2009 from prostate cancer.

== Bibliography ==
- Peter Wherrett's A Century of the Motor Car
- Marque a Hundred Years of Motoring ISBN 978-0-642-97460-0
- Torque ISBN 978-0-7254-0383-6
- Quest for the Perfect Car: My Life in Motoring
- Motoring Skills and Tactics
- Explore Australia BY Four-Wheel Drive with Kim Wherrett
- What They Don't Teach You in Driving School ISBN 978-1-920923-40-2
- Grit: An Epic Journey Across the World – the story of Francis Birtles epic 1927 journey. ISBN 978-1-920923-62-4
- Wheels of Australia (editor)
- Drive It! The Complete Book of High Speed Driving on Road And Track (1981)
- Desirelines: an unusual family Memoir (1997) with Richard Wherrett. ISBN 0-7336-0485-4
