= Huey's Cooking Adventures =

- Genre: Cooking
- Presented by: Iain Hewitson
- Country of origin: Australia
- Original language: English
- No. of seasons: 14
- No. of episodes: 354

Production
- Running time: 22 minutes (w/o commercials)
- Production companies: Roadhouse Productions (1997–2000); DreamPool Productions (2001–2010)

Original release
- Network: Seven Network (1997); Network Ten (1998–2010)
- Release: 1997 – 2010

Related
- Huey's Kitchen

Huey's Cooking Adventures is an Australian television series featuring chef Iain Hewitson. It screened at daytime on Monday to Friday throughout its run on Network Ten, including most recently at 4:00pm. The show began airing in 1997 on the Seven Network, before defecting to Ten soon after where the show has found popularity with daytime audiences. The program was replaced with a new, albeit similar, series Huey's Kitchen from March 2010.

== Synopsis ==
The show ran for half an hour, with Iain Hewitson often cooking "away from home" using local produce and ingredients. The show provides modern food as well as classics with a "Huey" influence. He's also known for throwing in his stories and jokes.

== Sponsors ==
In later seasons, major sponsors had a larger focus in the program, including an advertorial before the conclusion of each episode. These sponsors included:

- Campbell's Real Stock
- Viva Paper Towels
- Kikkoman
- McKenzie Foods
- Chemist Warehouse
- Bi-Lo

== See also ==
- List of Australian television series
- List of cooking shows
