= Almorzando Con Juana =

Argentine television game show

- Presented by: Mirtha Legrand
- Country of origin: Argentina

Original release
- Release: 3 June 1968 – December 26, 2021

Almorzando Con Juana was an Argentine talk show TV program. It was hosted by Mirtha Legrand. It was broadcast from June 3, 1968, to December 26, 2021.
