= Huey's Kitchen =

- Genre: Cooking
- Presented by: Iain Hewitson
- Country of origin: Australia
- Original language: English
- No. of seasons: 4
- No. of episodes: 460

Production
- Running time: 22 minutes (w/o commercials)

Original release
- Network: Network Ten
- Release: 29 March 2010 – 10 January 2014

Related
- Huey's Cooking Adventures

Huey's Kitchen is an Australian television series featuring chef Iain Hewitson cooking recipes that everyday cooks can try. The show airs on the Ten Network at varying times.

The first season premiered on 29 March 2010 and ran for 180 episodes till 24 December 2010. The second season started airing on 18 July 2011 until 18 November 2011 for 90 episodes, while the third started on 27 August 2012 until 11 January 2013 for 90 episodes. The fourth season started on 26 August 2013 until 10 January 2014 for 90 episodes. Repeats are also shown at varying times.

The program replaced an older, yet similar, series: Huey's Cooking Adventures. As with the previous series, Huey's Kitchen features an advertorial towards the end of some episodes for its major sponsor.

== See also ==
- List of Australian television series
- List of cooking shows
