= List of programs broadcast by Network 10 =

The following list of programs are broadcast by Network 10 / 10 HD in Australia, across its multi-channels 10 Comedy, 10 Drama and Nickelodeon, as well as regional and remote stations and online on the catch-up streaming service 10. Some regional and remote stations have alternate schedules and may air programs at different times.

== Currently broadcast on Network 10 ==
=== Domestic ===
==== News and current affairs ====
- Local productions
  - 10 News – weeknightly 5 pm evening bulletins produced locally in Sydney/Melbourne/Brisbane/Adelaide/Perth (1965–present)
- National programs produced in Sydney
  - 10 News: Lunchtime – 1.00pm–2.00pm weekdays (2023–present)
  - 10 News: Afternoons – 3.30pm–4.00pm weekdays (2024–present)
  - 10 News Weekend – 5.00pm–6.30pm weekends (1994–2011, 2012–present)
  - 10 Late News (1991–2011, 2012–2014, 2024–present)
  - 10 News+ – 6:00pm–7.00pm Sundays (2025–present)

==== Drama ====
- Neighbours (1986–2010, 2023–2025 on 10, 2011–2025 on 10 Comedy)
- NCIS: Sydney (2024–present)
- Fake (Paramount+)
- Paper Dolls (Paramount+)
- Imposter (drama) (2025–present)

==== Comedy ====
- Taskmaster Australia (2023–present)
- The Cheap Seats (2021–present)
- Sam Pang Tonight (2025–present)

==== Variety / Entertainment ====
- Have You Been Paying Attention? (2013–present)
- Thank God You're Here (2006–2007, 2023–present on 10, 2009 on Seven)
- Talkin' 'Bout Your Gen 2009–2012, 2025–present on 10, 2018–2019 on Nine)

==== Reality ====
- The Amazing Race Australia (2011–2014 on Seven, 2019–present on 10)
- Aussie Shore (Paramount+)
- Australian Survivor (2002 on Nine, 2006 on Seven, 2016–present on 10)
- Shark Tank (2015–2018, 2023–present)
- Hunted (2022–present)
- MasterChef Australia (2009–present)
- Dessert Masters (2023–present)
- House Hunters Australia (2025)
- Big Brother (reality, 2001–2008, 2025–present)
- The Traitors (2022–23, 2026–present)

==== Observational / documentary ====
- Advancing Australia (2021–present)
- Airport 24/7 (2025–present)
- Ambulance Australia (2018–present)
- Bondi Rescue (2006–present)
- Dogs Behaving (Very) Badly Australia (2023–present)
- Gogglebox Australia (2015–present) (co-produced with LifeStyle)
- Mirror Mirror (2021–present)
- Territory Cops (2012 on CI, 2016, 2021–present on 10)
- Todd Sampson's Body Hack (2016–present)
- Top Gear Australia (Paramount+)

==== Game shows ====
- Ready Steady Cook (2005–2013, 2024–present)
- Ultimate Classroom (2022–present on Nickelodeon)
- Deal or No Deal (2024–present)
- Who Wants to Be a Millionaire? (game show, 1999–2006, 2007, 2010, 2021 on Nine, 2026–present on 10)
- Are You Smarter Than A 5th Grader? (2007-2009)

==== Lifestyle ====
- 10 Minute Kitchen (2021–present)
- All 4 Adventure (2010–present)
- Australia By Design (2017–present)
- Buy to Build (2019–present)
- Escape Fishing with ET (1997–2004 on Nine, 2005–present on 10)
- Everyday Gourmet with Justine Schofield (2011–present)
- Farm to Fork (2019–present)
- Freshly Picked with Simon Toohey (2020–present)
- Good Chef Bad Chef (2006–2007 on Seven, 2011–present on TEN)
- Healthy Homes TV (2015–present)
- iFish (2009–present on 10 Drama)
- Lee Rayner's Fishing Edge (2017—present)
- Hungry (2022–present)
- Left Off The Map (2020–present)
- Luca's Key Ingredient (2021–present)
- Luxury Escapes (2017–present)
- The Offroad Adventure Show (2013–present)
- Pat Callinan's 4x4 Adventures (2008–present)
- Pooches at Play (2017–present)
- Reel Action (2013–present)
- Roads Less Travelled (2020–present)
- Seafood Escape with Andrew Ettingshausen (2019–present)
- Snap Happy (2017–present on 10 Drama)
- Taste of Australia with Hayden Quinn (2020–present)
- Three Blue Ducks (2021–present)
- Three Veg and Meat (2020–present)
- Waltzing Jimeoin (2021)
- Well Traveller (2022–present)
- Wildlife Rescue Australia (2022–present)
- What's Up Downunder (2012–present)
- WhichCar (2019–present)

==== Special ====
- Christmas with the Australian Women's Weekly (2010–2017 on Nine, 2019–present on 10)
- Easter with the Australian Women's Weekly (2012–2013 on Nine, 2020–present on 10)

==== Sports talk ====
- A-Leagues All Access (2022–present)
- Round Ball Rules (2022–present on 10 live stream)

==== Sports ====
- Basketball: NBL (1992–1997, 2010–2015, 2024–present on 10, 2021–2024 on 10 Peach)
- Formula One: Australian Grand Prix (2003–present)
- MotoGP: Australian MotoGP (1997–present)
- Mixed martial arts: Bellator MMA (2021–present)
- Soccer: A-League Men (2017–2019 on 10 Bold, 2021–2022 on 10, 2022–present on 10 Drama), A-League Women (2021–2022 on 10 Bold, 2022–present on 10 Play on demand), Socceroos and Matildas internationals (2018–2019, 2021–present on 10 and 10 Drama), Australia Cup (2021–present on 10), FA Cup (2022–2024 on 10)

==== Children's (Nickelodeon) ====
- Rock Island Mysteries (2022–present)

==== Preschool (Nickelodeon) ====
- Ready Set Dance (2020–present)

==== Annual events ====
- AACTA Awards (1985, 2002, 2013–2015, 2021–present)
- ARIA Music Awards (1992–2000, 2002–2008, 2010, 2014–2016, 2025–present, shared with Paramount+)

==== Religious ====
- Mass For You At Home (1971–present)

=== Foreign ===
==== News and current affairs ====
- 48 Hours (10 Drama)
- CBS Mornings (2007–present)

==== Animation (Nick at Nite) ====
- Aaahh!!! Real Monsters (2023–present)
- The Angry Beavers (2023–present)
- Avatar: The Last Airbender (2024–present)
- CatDog (2023–present)
- The Fairly OddParents (2014–2017, 2024–present)
- Hey Arnold! (2024–present)
- Invader Zim (2024–present)
- The Ren & Stimpy Show (1990s on 10, 2023–present)
- Rocket Power (2001, 2024–present)
- Rocko's Modern Life (2023–present)
- Teenage Mutant Ninja Turtles (1987 series) (2013–21, 2023–present)

==== Adult Animation (10 Comedy) ====
- South Park (2020–2023 on 10 Shake, 2023–present on 10 Comedy)

==== Soap operas ====
- The Bold and the Beautiful (1987–present; 10 Drama a week behind 10 airing)
- Days of Our Lives (2025–present; 10 Drama a week behind on-demand release)
- The Young and the Restless (2025–present; 10 Drama a week behind on-demand release)

==== Drama ====
- Blue Bloods
- Bull (2017–present)
- CSI: Vegas
- FBI (2018–present)
- FBI: Most Wanted
- FBI: International
- The Gilded Age (2022–present)
- Law & Order: Special Victims Unit (2000–present)
- Matlock
- NCIS (2004–present)
- NCIS: Hawaiʻi
- NCIS: Los Angeles
- NCIS: New Orleans
- NCIS: Origins
- SEAL Team (2018–2019 on Ten, 2019–present on 10 Drama)
- Elsbeth (2025–present)
- Watson (2025–present)

==== Comedy ====
- Frasier (10 Comedy and Nick at Nite)
- Friends (10 Comedy and Nick at Nite)
- Ghosts
- Ghosts Australia (comedy) (2025–present)
- Impractical Jokers (Nick at Nite)
- The Middle (Nick at Nite)
- Mom (Nick at Nite)
- The Big Bang Theory (10 Comedy and Nick at Nite)
- Two and a Half Men (10 Comedy and Nick at Nite)
- Rules of Engagement (10 Comedy)
- The King of Queens (10 Comedy)
- Becker (10 Comedy)

==== Variety / entertainment ====
- Dr. Phil (2007–present)
- The Doctors (2009–2015 on 10, 2015–present on 10 Drama)
- Entertainment Tonight (2012–present)
- The Graham Norton Show (2012–present)
- Judge Judy (1997–present)
- The Late Show with Stephen Colbert (2015 on 10 Comedy, 2015–present on Ten)
- The Talk (2012–present)
- The Drew Barrymore Show (2024–present)

==== Observational / documentary ====
- 999: What's Your Emergency? (2019–present)
- Ambulance (2017–present)
- Jamie's Ultimate Veg (2019–present)
- One Born Every Minute (2019–present)
- Underworld Histories (2019–present)

==== Game shows ====
- Family Feud (2024–present)
- Lingo (2024–present)
- Wheel of Fortune (2024–present)

==== Lifestyle ====
- The Dog House
- Jamie Oliver's cooking shows

==== Children's (Nickelodeon) ====
- 100 Things to Do Before High School (2024–present)
- The Barbarian and the Troll (2024–present)
- Bella and the Bulldogs (2023–present)
- The Casagrandes (2023–present)
- Danger Force (2023–present)
- Double Dare (2023–present)
- Henry Danger (2020–2023, 2025–present)
- Kamp Koral: SpongeBob's Under Years (2024–present)
- The Legend of Korra (2024–present)
- The Loud House (2020–present)
- Max & the Midknights (2025–present)
- Monster High (2023–present)
- The Patrick Star Show (2024–present)
- Pig Goat Banana Cricket (2024–present)
- The Really Loud House (2024–present)
- Rock Paper Scissors (2024–present)
- Sharkdog (2025–present)
- Side Hustle (2023–present)
- School of Rock (2024–present)
- The Smurfs (2023–present)
- Sonic Prime (2024–present)
- SpongeBob SquarePants (2002–2013, 2020–present)
- Tales of the Teenage Mutant Ninja Turtles (2025–present)
- Teenage Mutant Ninja Turtles (2012 series) (2013–16, 2024–present)
- The Thundermans (2020–present)
- The Thundermans: Undercover (2025–present)
- The Twisted Timeline of Sammy & Raj (2024–present)
- Tyler Perry's Young Dylan (2023–present)
- Zokie of Planet Ruby (2024–present)

==== Preschool (Nickelodeon) ====
- Baby Shark's Big Show! (2022–present)
- Blaze and the Monster Machines (2020–present)
- Blue's Clues & You! (2020–present)
- Bubble Guppies (2020–present)
- The Creature Cases (2025–present)
- Dora (2024–present)
- Gabby's Dollhouse (2024–present)
- Garden Academy (2024–present)
- Hamsters of Hamsterdale (2025–present)
- Ni Hao, Kai-Lan (2024–present)
- Paw Patrol (2020–present)
- Rubble & Crew (2024–present)
- Ryan's Mystery Playdate (2021–present)
- Santiago of the Seas (2022–present)
- Shimmer and Shine (2020–present)
- The Tiny Chef Show (2024–present)
- Top Wing (2020–22, 2024–present)

==== Annual events ====
- Nickelodeon Kids Choice Awards (Nickelodeon, shared with Paramount+)
- MTV Europe Music Award (2020–2022 on 10 Shake, 2025–present on 10 Comedy, shared with Paramount+)
- MTV Video Music Awards (2020, 2023–present on 10 Comedy, 2021–2022 on 10 Shake, shared with Paramount+)
- Tony Awards (2021–present on 10 Comedy, shared with Paramount+)

==== Religious ====
- Hour of Power
- Joel Osteen
- Joseph Prince: New Creation Church
- The Key of David
- Leading The Way with Michael Youssef
- Truth Link

== Upcoming series ==
=== Domestic ===
==== 2026 ====
- The Animal Sanctuary (2026 on 10)

==== 2027 ====
- Australian Ninja Warrior (formerly Nine Network, 2017–22)

=== Foreign ===
==== 2025 ====
- Bossy Bear (preschool)
- Just Tattoo of Us USA (reality)
- Ricky Zoom (preschool)
- Transformers: EarthSpark (children's)

2026

- David Attenborough's Parenthood (nature, 2026 on 10)
- Are You Smarter Than A 5th Grader? (2007–2009)

== Formerly broadcast ==
=== Domestic ===
==== News and current affairs ====
- 6.30 with George Negus (2011)
- 10 News First: Breakfast (2022)
- Alan Jones Live (1994)
- Breakfast (2012)
- The Bolt Report (2011–2015)
- The Project (2009–2025)
- Good Morning Australia (1981–1992)
- Good Morning Delhi (2010)
- Good Morning Melbourne (1981–1988)
- Good Morning Sydney (1978–1989)
- Hard Copy (1991)
- Hinch (Seven 1987–1991, moved to Ten 1992–1994)
- Meet the Press (1992–2013)
- Newsweek (1996–1998)
- Page One (1988)
- Public Eye (1988–1989)
- Revealed (2013)
- Studio 10 (2013–2023)
- Ten News at Noon (2004)
- Ten Eyewitness News: Early (2006–2012, 2013–2014)
- Ten Eyewitness News: Morning (1994–2011, 2012, 2013–2014)
- ttn (2004–2008)
- Wake Up (2013–2014)

==== Drama ====
- Above the Law (2000–2001)
- After the Deluge (2003)
- The Appleton Ladies' Potato Race (2023)
- Arcade (1980)
- Bangkok Hilton (1989)
- Bellamy (1981)
- Big Sky (1997–1999)
- Bikie Wars: Brothers in Arms (2012)
- BlackJack telemovies (2003–2007)
- Bodyline (1984)
- The Box (1974–1977)
- Breakers (1998–1999)
- Brock (2016)
- Captain James Cook (1987)
- Cop Shop (1977–1984) (reruns on 10 Peach/WIN 2016–2021)
- Carson's Law (1983–1984) (reruns on 10 Peach/WIN 2016–2021)
- Chopper Squad (1976–1979)
- The Cooks (2004–2005, co-production with UKTV)
- A Country Practice (1981–1993 on Seven, moved to Ten in 1994)
- The Cowra Breakout (1985)
- CrashBurn (2003)
- The Day of the Roses (1998)
- The Dirtwater Dynasty (1988)
- The Dismissal (1983)
- Division 4 (1969–1975) (reruns on 10 Peach/WIN 2016–2021)
- E Street (1989–1993)
- Echo Point (1995)
- Emma: Queen of the South Seas (1988)
- Emerald Falls (2008)
- The Flying Doctors (1986–1993) (reruns on 10 Peach/WIN 2016–2021)
- Go Big (2004)
- The Harp in the South (1986)
- Hawke (2010)
- Homicide (1964–1977) (reruns on 10 Peach/WIN 2016–2021)
- Heartbreak High (1993–1996, moved to ABC 1997–1999)
- Heat (2023)
- Holiday Island (1981)
- Hotel Story (1977)
- Ihaka: Blunt Instrument (2001)
- The Incredible Journey of Mary Bryant (2005)
- The Informant (2008)
- Jessica (2004)
- Joanne Lees: Murder in the Outback (2007)
- Lie With Me (2021)
- The Long Arm (1970)
- Mary: The Making of a Princess (2015)
- Matlock Police (1971–1976)
- Medivac (1996–1998)
- Mirror, Mirror (1995)
- A Model Daughter: The Killing of Caroline Byrne (2009)
- Mr & Mrs Murder (2013)
- My Brother Jack (2001)
- My Brother Tom (1986)
- My Husband, My Killer (2001)
- North Shore (2023)
- Number 96 (1972–1977)
- Offspring (2010–2014, 2016–2017)
- The Other Side of Paradise (1992)
- Out of the Blue (2008–2009)
- Party Tricks (2014)
- Playing for Keeps (2018–2019)
- Poor Man's Orange (1987)
- Prisoner (1979–1986)
- Puberty Blues (2012, 2014)
- Punishment (1981)
- Reef Doctors (2013, Ten/Eleven)
- The Restless Years (1977–1981)
- Return to Eden (1986)
- Richmond Hill (1988)
- Riptide (2023)
- Rush (2008–2011)
- The Saddle Club (2001–2009) (reruns on 10 Peach/WIN 2016–2021)
- The Secret Life of Us (2001–2005)
- Secrets & Lies (2014)
- The Secrets She Keeps (2020 on 10, 2022 on Paramount+)
- Shark's Paradise (1986)
- Sisters (2017)
- Small Claims (2004)
- Small Claims: White Wedding (2005)
- The Society Murders (2006)
- Special Squad (1984)
- State Coroner (1997–1998)
- The Surgeon (2005)
- The Sullivans (1976–1983) (reruns on 10 Peach/WIN 2016–2021)
- Sweat (1996)
- Tanamera - Lion of Singapore (1989)
- Temptation (2003, co-production with UKTV)
- Tripping Over (2006)
- Underground: The Julian Assange Story (2012)
- Vietnam (1987)
- Wake in Fright (2017)
- Waterfront (1984)
- White Collar Blue (2001–2003)
- Wonderland (2013–2015)
- The Wrong Girl (2016–2017)
- Five Bedrooms (2019–2023)

==== Adult Animation ====
- Pacific Heat (2017 on Eleven) (originally broadcast on The Comedy Channel in 2016)

==== Comedy ====
- All Aussie Adventures (2001–2002, 2004, 2018)
- Are You Being Served? (1980–1981)
- The B Team (2005)
- Bingles (1992–1993)
- Col'n Carpenter (1990–1991)
- The Comedy Company (1988–1990)
- Darren & Brose (2015 on One)
- Die on Your Feet (2014 on One)
- Drunk History Australia (2018–2020)
- Totally Full Frontal (1998–1999)
- Good News World (2011)
- How to Stay Married (2018–2021)
- Kenny's World (2008)
- Kinne Tonight (Pilot 2018, 2019–2020)
- Late for School (1992)
- Let the Blood Run Free (1990–1994)
- Mark Loves Sharon (2008)
- Melbourne International Comedy Festival specials (1998–2016, moved to ABC)
- Micro Nation (2012 on Eleven)
- Mikey, Pubs and Beer Nuts (2000)
- Mr. Black (2019)
- Ratbags (1981)
- Real Stories (2006)
- The Ronnie Johns Half Hour (2005–2006)
- Russell Coight's Celebrity Challenge (2004)
- Sit Down, Shut Up (2001)
- skitHOUSE (2003–2004)
- Street Smart (2018)
- The Wedge (2006–2007)

==== Variety / entertainment ====
- 9am with David & Kim (2006–2009)
- After Noon (1985)
- AXN (1999)
- Beauty and the Beast (1963–1970 on Seven, 1982–2002 on Ten, moved to Foxtel 2005–2007)
- The Big Night In with John Foreman (2005–2006)
- Can of Worms (2011–2013)
- Candid Camera (1989–1990)
- Chris & Julia's Sunday Night Takeaway (2019)
- The Circle (2010–2012)
- Couch Time (2011–2017 on Eleven)
- David Tench Tonight (2006)
- Dita (1967–1970)
- Download (2007–2008)
- GNW Night Lite (1999)
- Good Morning Australia with Bert Newton (1992–2005)
- Good News Week (1996–1998 on ABC, moved to Ten in 1999–2000, 2008–2012)
- Hamish & Andy Re-Gifted (2008–2010)
- Hamish & Andy's Caravan of Courage (2007–2010, moved to Nine 2012)
- His and Hers (1971–1972)
- Hughesy, We Have a Problem (2018–2020)
- John Laws – In One Lifetime (1998)
- Late Night Australia (1988)
- A League of Their Own (2013)
- Learn India with Hamish & Andy (2010)
- Live at the Chapel (1999–2006)
- The Mike Walsh Show (1973–1976, moved to Nine 1977–1984)
- Monday to Friday (1996)
- Movie Juice (2014–2015)
- New Faces (Nine 1963–1985, 1989–1990, moved to Ten 1991–1993)
- Noel and Mary (1967)
- The Panel (1998–2004)
- The Panel Christmas Wrap (2003–2007)
- Parkinson in Australia (1979–1982)
- Pets Behaving Badly (2000–2001)
- Pilot Week (2018–2022)
  - Pilot Week (2018), including Bring Back Saturday Night, Trial By Kyle, Taboo, Drunk History, Kinne Tonight, Disgrace!, Dave and Skit Happens
  - Pilot Week Season 2 (2019), including Part Time Privates, Sydney's Crazy Rich Asians, I Am...Roxy! and My 80 Year Old Flatmate
  - Pilot Showcase (2022), including Courtney's Closet, Dinner Guest, The Love Experiment, The Bush Blonde vs The World, Time to Die and Abbie Chats
- Rove (1999 on Nine, moved to Ten 2000–2009)
- Saturday Night Rove (2019)
- Say It with Music (1967–1969)
- Shaun Micallef's New Year's Rave (2009)
- Show Me the Movie! (2018–2019)
- The Spearman Experiment (2009)
- Talkin' To Kids with Don Lane (1987)
- Taboo (2018–2019)
- This Week Live (2013)
- Til Ten (1989–1991)
- Trial By Kyle (2018–2019)
- Unreal Ads (2000)
- Unreal Stuff Ups (2001)
- Unreal TV (1999–2001)
- Whose Line Is It Anyway? Australia (2017; originally broadcast on The Comedy Channel in 2016)
- Would I Lie to You? Australia (2022–23)
- Young Talent Time (1971–1988, 2012)
- You've Got To Be Joking (1987)
- Where the Action Is

==== Lifestyle ====
- The 48 Hour Destination (2017–2018)
- Aerobics Oz Style (1982–2005)
- Behind the Sash (2019)
- Ben's Menu (2014–2016)
- Blokesworld (2004–2005)
- Boys Weekend (2004)
- Bright Ideas (1997–2005)
- The Cook's Pantry with Matt Sinclair (2017)
- Cruise Mode (2016–2017)
- Everyday Health (2016)
- Foodie Adventures with Ash Pollard (2018)
- Far Flung with Gary Mehigan (2015)
- Healthy, Wealthy and Wise (1992–1998)
- The Home Team (2015–2016)
- Huey's Cooking Adventures (1997 on Seven, moved to Ten 1998–2010)
- Huey's Kitchen (2010–2014)
- Let's Do Coffee (2015)
- The Living Room (2012–2022)
- Love to Share (2012–2013)
- Miguel's Feasts (2014–2015)
- My Market Kitchen (2016)
- Personal Touch (1966)
- Photo Number 6 (2018)
- The Renovation King (2015)
- Sammy and Bella's Kitchen Rescue (2017)
- Sex/Life (1994–1998)
- The Rovers (1969–1970)
- Travels with the Bondi Vet (2015)
- Weekend Feast (2016)
- Yes Chef (2012)

==== Reality ====
- The $20 Challenge (2001)
- Aussie Queer Eye for the Straight Guy (2005)
- Australian Idol (2003–2009)
- Australian Princess (2005–2007)
- Bachelor in Paradise Australia (2018–2020)
- The Bachelor Australia (2013–2024)
- The Bachelorette Australia (2015–2021)
- The Band
- The Biggest Loser (2006–2015, 2017)
- CCTV (2000)
- Celebrity Big Brother (2002)
- Celebrity Dog School (2007)
- The Challenge: Australia (2022)
- Changing Rooms (1998–2005 on Nine, 2019 on 10)
- Come Date with Me (2013–2014 on Eleven)
- Dancing with the Stars (2004–2015 on Seven, 2019–2020 on 10)
- Don't Tell the Bride (2012)
- Everybody Dance Now (2012)
- First Dates Australia (2016–2018, 2020 on Seven, 2022 on 10, moved to Seven)
- The Fugitive (2001)
- Get Me Out of Here, Now! (2016 on Eleven)
- Girlband (2006)
- The Hot House (2004)
- House From Hell (1998)
- I Will Survive (2012)
- Inside Idol (2003–2005)
- Junior MasterChef Australia (2010–11, 2020)
- Location Location Location Australia (2023)
- Making It Australia (2021)
- MasterChef Australia All-Stars (2012)
- MasterChef Australia: The Professionals (2013)
- The Masked Singer Australia (2019–2023)
- The Real Love Boat (2022)
- Recipe to Riches (2013–2014)
- I'm a Celebrity...Get Me Out of Here! (2015–2026)
- The Renovators (2011)
- The Resort (2004)
- Scream Test (2001)
- Search for a Supermodel (2000–2002)
- So You Think You Can Dance Australia (2008–2010, 2014)
- Teen Mom Australia (2020 on 10 Shake)
- Undercover Boss Australia (2010–2011)
- Unreal TV (1999–2001)
- The X Factor (2005, moved to Seven 2010–2016)
- Yasmin's Getting Married (2006)

==== Observational / documentary ====
- Advancing Australia (2021)
- Being Lara Bingle (2012)
- Beyond 2000 (1993–1995, 1999)
- Bondi Ink Tattoo (2015 on Eleven)
- Bondi Rescue: Bali (2008)
- Bondi Vet (2009–2016)
- Class Of... (2012)
- Common Sense Australia (2017) (co-produced with LifeStyle)
- Cool Aid: The National Carbon Test (2005)
- Croc Files (1999–2001)
- The Crocodile Hunter (1997–2004)
- The Crocodile Hunter Diaries (2002–2004)
- Girlband (2006)
- Gold Coast Cops (2014–2015)
- Guerrilla Gardeners (2009)
- Honey, We're Killing the Kids (2006)
- The Hunt for the Family Court Killer (2023)
- Jamie's Kitchen Australia (2006)
- Keeping Up with the Joneses (2010–2011)
- Long Lost Family (2016)
- One Born Every Minute Australia (2019)
- Recruits (2009–2010)
- Recruits: Paramedics (2011)
- Saving Babies (2007)
- Saving Kids (2008)
- Second Chance Champions (2023)
- The Secret Life of 4 Year Olds (2018)
- The Shire (2012)
- The Steph Show (2006)
- Steve Irwin's Wildlife Warriors (2012–2013)
- Teen Fit Camp (2007)
- The Truth Is (2013)
- Wanted (2013)
- The Dog House Australia (2021–2025)
- The First Inventors (2023)

==== Game shows ====
- All Star Family Feud (2016–2018)
- Are You Smarter Than a 5th Grader? (2007–2009)
- Australia's Brainiest specials (2005)
- Australia's Brainiest Kid (2004 on Seven, moved to Ten in 2005)
- Battle of the Sexes (1998)
- Blankety Blanks (1977–1978, moved to Nine 1985–1986 and 1996)
- Blind Date (1991, 2018)
- Casino 10 (1975–1977)
- The Celebrity Game (1969 on Nine, 1976–1977 on Ten)
- Celebrity Name Game (2019–2020)
- Celebrity Squares (1967, moved to Nine 1975–1976)
- The Con Test (2007)
- The Cube (2021)
- The Daryl and Ossie Show (1978)
- Double Dare (1989–1992)
- Family Double Dare (1989)
- Family Feud (2014–2018, 2020)
- The Family Game (1967)
- Friday Night Games (2006)
- Game of Games (2018)
- The Generation Gap (1969)
- Get the Message (1971–1972)
- Gladiators (2024)
- The Gong Show (1976)
- The Great Australian Spelling Bee (2015–2016 on Ten, 2016 on Eleven)
- The Great TV Game Show (1989)
- Greed (2001)
- I Do I Do (1996)
- It's Academic (1968–1969, later moved to Seven)
- It's a Knockout (1985–1987, 2011)
- Jeopardy! (1993)
- Joker Poker (2005–2006)
- Long Play (1977)
- The Marriage Game (1966–1972)
- Match Game (1960s)
- Mind Twist (1992–1993)
- Moment of Truth (2001)
- Money Makers (1971–1973, 1982)
- The Newlywed Game (1968, moved to Nine 1987)
- Off to the Races (1967–1969)
- Perfect Match (1984–1989, moved to Seven 2002)
- Personality Squares (1967–1969, 1981)
- Playcards (1969)
- Pointless (2018–2019)
- Pot Luck (1987)
- Pot of Gold (1975–1978)
- The Price Is Right (1973–1974, 1989)
- Pyramid Challenge (1978)
- A Question of Sport (1995–1996)
- Search for a Star (1970–1971, 1981)
- Second Chance (1977)
- Shaun Micallef's Brain Eisteddfod (2022)
- Showcase (1965–1970, 1973–1974, 1978)
- Split Personality (1967)
- Star Search (1985–1986, 1991)
- Superquiz (1989)
- Surprise! Surprise! (1972)
- Take A Letter (1967)
- Taken Out (2008)
- Tell The Truth (Nine 1959–1965, moved to Ten 1971–1972)
- Treasure Hunt (1977–1978)
- The Up-Late Game Show (2005–2006)
- Wheel of Fortune Australia (2024)
- You're A Star (1982)

==== Children's ====
- Andrew Daddo Presents... (1987)
- Andrew Daddo's Cartoon Show (1987)
- Animalia (2007–2010)
- Baby Animals In Our World (2016–2018)
- The Barefoot Bandits (2016–2020) (Note: Originally broadcasting with New Zealand voice actors, the series has been presented with the Canadian dub since 2018.)
- The Big Breakfast (1992–95)
- The Big Cheez (1998–2005)
- The Bureau of Magical Things (2018–2022)
- Cartoon Capers (1985–1987)
- The Children's Show (1964)
- Cheez TV (1995–2005)
- Crash the Bash (2016–2018)
- Cybergirl (2001–2002)
- Dex Hamilton: Alien Entomologist (2008–2012)
- The Digswell Dog Show (1996)
- Dive Club (2021–2023)
- The Early Bird Show (1985–1989)
- The Elephant Princess (2008–2009, 2011–2014)
- Faireez (2005–2008)
- Fast Tracks (1998–1999)
- Fergus McPhail (2004)
- The Finder (1991)
- For Real! (2020)
- Fredd Bear's Breakfast-A-Go-Go (1969–72)
- Gamify (2019–2020)
- Get Ace (2014–18)
- Guinevere Jones (2002)
- H_{2}O: Just Add Water (2006–14)
- The Henderson Kids (1985–87)
- Horace and Tina (2001–02)
- I Got a Rocket (2006–09)
- It's Academic (1968–69, later moved to Seven)
- Jar Dwellers SOS (2013–20)
- K-9 (2010–12)
- Kelly (1991)
- Ketchup: Cats Who Cook (1998–2000, later aired on Nine)
- Kids Company (1988–92 in Perth only)
- Kids' Stuff (1991–93)
- Kuu Kuu Harajuku (2015–20)
- Lexi & Lottie: Trusty Twin Detectives (2016–18)
- Lightning Point (2012–14)
- The Lost Islands (1976)
- Mako: Island of Secrets (2013–18)
- Me and My Monsters (2010–14)
- The Miraculous Mellops (1991–93)
- Mirror, Mirror (1995)
- Mission Top Secret (1994–95)
- The New Adventures of Ocean Girl (2000)
- Nick News (2022–2023)
- Ocean Girl (1994–97)
- Ocean Star (2003)
- Off the Dish (1986)
- Once Upon a Dream (2012–13)
- Outback 8 (2008–10)
- Pearlie (2009, 2011–12)
- Pirate Islands (2003, 2007–10)
- Quimbo's Quest (2019–20)
- Random and Whacky (2017–20)
- Ridgey Didge (1987–1989)
- The Rovers (1969–70)
- Sam Fox: Extreme Adventures (2014–18)
- Scooter: Secret Agent (2005)
- Scope (2005–20)
- Shake Takes (2020–22)
- Sherazade: The Untold Stories (2017–20)
- SheZow (2012–15)
- The Shorn Sheep Show (1992)
- Simon Townsend's Wonder World (1979–86)
- Sumo Mouse (originally aired on ABC3)
- The Toothbrush Family (1998–99, later aired on Nine)
- Thunderstone (1999–2001)
- Toasted TV (2005–2020)
- Totally Wild (1992–2021)
- ttn (2004–08)
- Vic the Viking (2013–17, moved to ABC ME)
- Wicked Science (2004–06)
- Where You Find the Ladybird (1996)
- Wormwood (2007–08, 2010)
- Worst Best Friends (2002)
- Yakkity Yak (2003, later aired on ABC, ABC1 and ABC3)

==== Preschool ====
- Calvin & Kaison's Play Power! (2022)
- Crocamole (2016–2021)
- Fat Cat and Friends (1972–1987 in Adelaide)
- Hi-5 House (2014–2015)
- In the Box (1998–2006)
- Mulligrubs (1988–1996)
- The Music Shop (1996–1998)
- Puzzle Play (2006–2011)
- Rock It! (2007)
- Wurrawhy (2011–2016)

==== Music ====
- Airplay (in Perth only)
- The Go!! Show (1964–1967)
- Ground Zero (1997–2001)
- The House of Hits (2000)
- The Loop (2012–2020 on 10 Peach)
- Music Video (1983–1987)
- Nightmoves (1984–1986)
- Night Shift (1987–1989)
- Pepsi Live (2001–2003)
- Say it with Music (1967–1969)
- Take 40 Australia (1993–2009)
- Uptight (1967–1969)
- Video Hits (1987–2011)
- Where The Action Is (1967)
- Work (1982)

==== Sports talk ====
- Back Page (simulcast with Fox Sports 2017 on One)
- Before the Game (2003–2013)
- Beyond the Boundary (2006)
- Drivetime TV (2001–2005 in Perth only)
- The Final Siren (2011 on One)
- The Game Plan (AFL) (2011–2012 on One)
- The Game Plan (NRL) (2011–2013 on Ten and One)
- Good Morning Delhi (2010)
- Inside Sport
- Just for Kicks (simulcast with Fox Sports 2017 on One)
- Late Night League (NRL) (1989–1991)
- Melbourne Cup Carnival Preview Show (2020–2023)
- MVP (2010 on One)
- Sochi Live (2014)
- One Week at a Time (AFL) (2009–2011 on One)
- One Week at a Time (NRL) (2011 on One)
- Overtime (2010–2011 on One)
- The Pro Shop (2009–2010 on One)
- RPM (1997–2008, 2011, 2015–2020)
- Seriously AFL
- Simply Footy (2002–2011 in Adelaide only)
- Sports Tonight (1993–2011, 2018–2019)
- Sportsweek (1991)
- Teams on 10 (2020–2021 on 10 Play)
- Thursday Night Live (2009–2010 on One)
- The Thursday Night Sport Show (2014 on One)
- The Western Front (2002–2011 in Perth only)
- Trackside
- World Football News (2010 on One)

==== Sports ====
- Australian rules football: AFL including AFL Grand Final (2002–2011)
- Commonwealth Games: Victoria 1994, Delhi 2010, Glasgow 2014
- Cricket: KFC Big Bash League (2013–2018) and Rebel Women's Big Bash League (2015–2018)
- Formula One: International races (2003–2017)
- MotoGP International races (1997–2021)
- Horse racing: The Melbourne Cup Carnival (1978–2001, 2019–2023)
- Netball: ANZ Championship (2008–2012, 2015–2016) and INF Netball World Cup (1999, 2011, 2015)
- Rugby league: NSW Premiership (1983–1991), Amco Cup (1974–1991)
- Rugby Union: Super 10 (1993–1995), Wallabies internationals, including Bledisloe Cup and The Rugby Championship (1992–1995, 2013–2020) and Rugby World Cup (1995, 2007, 2019)
- Virgin Australia Supercars Championship including Bathurst 1000 (1997–2006, 2015–2020)
- Summer Olympic Games: Los Angeles 1984, Seoul 1988
- Swimming: Australian Swimming Championships (2009–2015) and Pan Pacific Swimming Championships (2010–2015)
- Winter Olympic Games: Sochi 2014
- Yachting: Sydney to Hobart Yacht Race (1980s–2004)

==== Special ====
- 50 Years Young (2014)
- Australia Unites: Reach Out To Asia (shared with Seven & Nine)
- Seriously 40 (2005)

==== Annual events ====
- Australia Day Live Concert (2004–2008)
- Australia Day Concert: Live at the Sydney Opera House (2016–2018, moved to ABC)
- Carols in the City (2008–2013, moved to Nine in Brisbane only)
- Logie Awards (1981, 1983, 1985, 1987, 1990, 1993, moved to Seven)
- Sydney New Year's Eve Fireworks (2006–2008, returned to Nine in 2009, then moved to ABC in 2013)
- Tropfest (previously on Nine, 2007–2010 on Movie Extra, 2011–2013 on SBS, 2014–2016 on SBS2, 2017 on Eleven, moved to ABC Comedy)

==== Religious ====
- Enjoying Everyday Life With Joyce Meyer

=== Foreign ===
==== News and current affairs ====
- The CBS Early Show
- CBS This Morning
- E! News (moved to E!)
- Fast Track
- Sightings
- NBC Today (moved to Seven)

==== Soap opera ====
- 2000 Malibu Road
- All My Children
- Another World
- As the World Turns
- Dallas (1978–1991 series)
- Emergency – Ward 10
- General Hospital
- Glitter
- Malibu Shores
- Melrose Place
- One Life to Live
- Peyton Place
- Ryan's Hope
- Santa Barbara
- Sunset Beach
- Texas

==== Western ====
- Black Saddle
- Bonanza
- Broken Arrow
- Fury
- Gunsmoke
- Laredo
- Maverick
- The Rifleman
- Sky King
- The Texan
- The Westerner

==== Adult Animation ====
- Assy McGee
- Beavis and Butt-Head
- Bob's Burgers (Season 1–7, 2011–2017 on ELEVEN, moved to Fox8, Now on Disney+)
- BoJack Horseman (2020–2023 on 10 Shake)
- Bordertown (ELEVEN)
- Celebrity Deathmatch
- The Cleveland Show (2009–10 on 10, 2011–13 on Eleven, 2020 on 10 Shake, moved to 7flix, Now on Disney+)
- The Critic
- Dilbert
- Futurama (2005–2010 on 10, 2011–2017 on ELEVEN, moved to 7mate later 7flix, Now on Disney+)
- The Simpsons (Season 1–28, 1991–2011, 2012–2014 on 10, 2011–2017 on ELEVEN, later on 7mate and 7flix, Now on Disney+)
- Son of Zorn (ELEVEN)
- Unsupervised

==== Drama ====
- 24: Legacy
- 24: Live Another Day
- 240-Robert
- The 4400
- 7th Heaven
- 90210
- Adam-12
- Alfred Hitchcock Presents
- Alien Nation
- A Million Little Things
- Amazing Stories
- American Crime Story
- American Horror Story (ELEVEN)
- American Gothic
- The Andros Targets
- Army Wives
- Automan
- Battlestar Galactica
- Baywatch (moved to 9Go!)
- Baywatch Nights
- Beauty & the Beast
- Beecham House (2020 on 10 Play and Ten)
- Beverly Hills 90210
- BH90210
- The Bionic Woman
- The Black Forest Clinic
- Blind Justice
- Breaking Point
- The Bronx Zoo
- The Buccaneers
- Buffy the Vampire Slayer
- Burke's Law
- Burn Notice
- The Byrds of Paradise
- California Fever
- Californication
- Cane
- Charlie's Angels
- Charmed (original series)
- Charmed (revival)
- Civil Wars
- Cleopatra 2525
- Code R
- Columbo
- Conviction
- Coronet Blue
- The Cosby Mysteries
- Covington Cross
- Crazy Like a Fox
- CSI: Cyber
- Dawson's Creek
- The Defenders
- Dexter
- Diamonds
- Doc
- Dollhouse
- Doogie Howser, M.D.
- Dragnet Today
- The Dukes of Hazzard
- The DuPont Show with June Allyson
- East Side/West Side
- Eight Is Enough
- Elementary (2013–2017, 2018–2020 on 10, 2017–2018 on 10 Bold)
- Emergency!
- Empire (ELEVEN)
- Equal Justice
- The Equalizer
- Eureka
- The Ex List
- Extant
- Extreme
- EZ Streets
- Family Law
- Fantasy Island
- The Flash (10 Peach)
- The Finder
- Flipper (1964)
- Flipper (1995)
- Flying High
- Fortune Hunter
- Footballers' Wives
- Friday Night Lights
- The Fugitive
- Gang Related
- A Gifted Man
- The Glades
- Glitter
- Go Girls
- Going to California
- The Good Wife
- Graceland
- The Greatest American Hero (later aired on ABC and Seven)
- The Greatest Show on Earth
- The Guardian
- Hack
- Hawaii Five-0 (2010–2016 on 10, 2017–2020–2024 on 10 Bold Drama)
- Hazell
- Harper's Island
- Highway to Heaven
- Homeland (moved to SBS)
- Hooperman
- Hoover vs. The Kennedys
- Hope Island
- House
- In Plain Sight
- Instinct (2018–2019 on Ten)
- JAG (originally aired on Seven)
- Jane the Virgin (2016 on 10 Peach)
- Jericho
- Journeyman
- Karaoke High
- Kentucky Jones
- The Killing
- L.A. Law
- Law & Order
- Law & Order: Criminal Intent
- Law & Order: Trial By Jury (2006)
- Law & Order: UK
- Legends
- Leg Work
- Legmen
- Lie to Me
- Life
- Life on Mars
- Limitless
- Lost in Space
- MacGyver (2016 on Ten, 2017–2021 on 10 Bold)
- Madam Secretary
- The Magician
- Magnum P.I.
- Man at the Top
- Mann & Machine
- Matt Houston
- Marcus Welby, M.D.
- Medium
- Merlin
- Miami Vice (originally aired on Nine)
- Minder (originally aired on ABC and Seven)
- Minority Report (ONE)
- The Mississippi
- Mistral's Daughter
- Moon Over Miami
- Murder, She Wrote (originally aired on Nine, later returned to air on Nine in 1998)
- Murphy's Law
- My Family and Other Animals
- My Life Is Murder (2019, 2022–2023, Now on 9Now)
- M.A.N.T.I.S.
- The Net
- New York Undercover
- Northern Exposure
- Now and Again
- NUMB3RS
- Nurse Jackie
- NYC 22
- NYPD Blue
- The O.C.
- On Wings of Eagles
- One Tree Hill
- The Outer Limits
- Over There
- Party of Five
- Peak Practice
- Picket Fences
- Private Eye
- The Professionals
- PSI Factor: Chronicles of the Paranormal
- Quantum Leap
- Queens Supreme
- Ringer
- Robbery Homicide Division
- Robin's Hoods
- The Rockford Files
- Roots: The Next Generations
- The Ruth Rendell Mysteries
- Sable
- Saving Grace
- Scorpion
- SeaQuest DSV
- Seven Days
- The Shield
- Sliders
- Smallville (originally aired on Nine)
- Sons of Anarchy
- Stargate Universe
- Starman
- The Street
- Supernatural
- Surface
- Tell Me You Love Me
- Tequila and Bonetti
- Terra Nova
- The Time Tunnel
- This Is Us (2017–2018, 2020–2022 on 10, 2018 on 10 Peach)
- Those Who Kill
- Three Rivers
- Threshold
- Tommy
- Torchwood
- Touch
- Tour of Duty
- The Trials of O'Brien
- Tropical Heat
- The Twilight Zone
- TV 101
- Tyrant (repeats)
- T. J. Hooker
- Under the Dome
- University Hospital
- The Untouchables
- V (1983)
- V (1984)
- V: The Final Battle
- V.I.P.
- Veronica Mars
- WIOU
- White Collar
- Winnetka Road
- Wisdom of the Crowd
- Wolf Lake
- A Woman Called Golda
- Women's Murder Club
- Wonder Woman
- The Wonder Years
- The X-Files

==== Comedy ====
- ...And Mother Makes Three
- 1600 Penn
- 227
- Accidental Family
- Accidentally on Purpose
- The Addams Family
- After M*A*S*H
- Alice
- Alright Already
- Amos 'n' Andy
- Ask Harriet
- Back to You
- The Barry Humphries Show
- Batman
- Beadle's About
- Becker
- Ben and Kate
- The Benny Hill Show
- Bette
- Between Brothers
- The Beverly Hillbillies
- The Bill Dana Show
- Bizarre
- Bless This House
- The Bob Crane Show
- Boston Common
- The Brady Bunch (originally aired on Nine)
- Brush Strokes (originally aired on ABC)
- Buffalo Bill
- Butterflies (originally aired on ABC)
- Campus Cops
- Charles in Charge
- Check It Out!
- Cheers (later moved to Nine in the early 1990s)
- Coach
- Colonel Humphrey Flack
- Comedy Central Roast (10 Shake)
- Complete Savages
- The Conners
- Coupling (U.S. version)
- Courting Alex
- Crazy Ex-Girlfriend (2016–2018 on 10 Peach)
- Dads
- Dad's Army (originally aired on ABC)
- The Danny Thomas Show
- Death Valley
- The Defenders
- Delta
- Dennis the Menace (1959) (originally aired on Seven)
- Dharma & Greg (originally aired on Seven)
- Diff'rent Strokes
- Die On Your Feet
- Don't Trust the B— in Apartment 23
- The Doris Day Show
- Dream On
- Drexell's Class
- Drunk History US (2019–2020 on 10 Peach, 2020 on 10 Shake)
- The Dumplings
- Ed
- Ellen (originally aired on Seven)
- Enos
- Everybody Hates Chris
- Everybody Loves Raymond
- Executive Stress (originally aired on ABC)
- The Ex List
- F Troop (originally aired on ABC)
- The Facts of Life
- The Farmer's Daughter
- Fast Times
- Fat Actress
- Father, Dear Father
- Father Knows Best
- Ffizz
- Flappers
- Flight of the Conchords
- Flo
- Fresh Off the Boat (2015–2017 on ELEVEN)
- Friends with Benefits
- Gary & Mike
- George and Mildred
- The Ghost & Mrs. Muir
- Gilligan's Island
- Glee
- Going Straight
- Going to California
- Gomer Pyle, U.S.M.C.
- The Goodies (originally aired on ABC and Seven)
- The Good Life (originally aired on ABC)
- Goodnight, Beantown
- Good Times
- Grace & Favour
- The Great Indoors (ELEVEN)
- Greetings from Tucson
- The Grinder (Eleven)
- Grosse Pointe
- The Grumbleweeds Radio Show
- Half Nelson
- Happy Together (2019 on 10 Peach)
- Harry and the Hendersons (originally aired on ABC)
- Hearts Afire
- House Calls
- House of Lies
- Hudson Street
- I Married Dora
- In-Laws
- In Living Color
- Inside Amy Schumer (10 Shake)
- It Ain't Half Hot Mum (originally aired on ABC and Seven)
- It's All Relative
- Jake 2.0
- The Jeffersons
- The Jeff Foxworthy Show
- Julia
- Just Good Friends (originally aired on ABC)
- Just Shoot Me!
- Karen's Song
- Keep It in the Family
- The King of Kensington
- Knight and Daye
- L for Lester
- The Larry Sanders Show
- Last Man Standing
- Laugh-In
- Laurel and Hardy
- Leo & Liz in Beverly Hills
- Life in Pieces (2016–2017 on TEN)
- Little Britain USA
- The Liver Birds (originally aired on ABC)
- Love Thy Neighbour
- Love, Sidney
- Mad About You (moved to 9Gem)
- Madman of the People
- Major Dad
- Man with a Plan (2017–2019 on 10, 2019–2020 on 10 Peach)
- Maniac Mansion
- The Many Loves of Dobie Gillis
- Marblehead Manor
- Married... with Children (later moved to Nine)
- Mayberry R.F.D.
- M*A*S*H (moved to 7two)
- McHale's Navy
- The Neighborhood
- The Millers
- A Minute With Stan Hooper
- Modern Family (2010–2017, moved to Seven)
- Moesha
- The Mothers-in-Law
- Mr. Terrific
- The Munsters
- The Munsters Today
- The Muppet Show (originally aired on Seven)
- Murphy Brown (Revival series)
- My Favorite Martian (originally aired on ABC)
- The Naked Truth
- The Nanny (moved to 9Go!)
- Nanny and the Professor
- Ned and Stacey
- NewsRadio
- The New Dick Van Dyke Show
- New Girl (2012–2013 on TEN, 2014–2017 on ELEVEN, moved to SBS Viceland)
- Night Court
- Night Stand with Dick Dietrick
- No Time for Sergeants
- The Odd Couple
- Odd Man Out
- The Office (moved to 10 Shake)
- Only Fools and Horses
- Only When I Laugh
- Our Miss Brooks
- Out of Practice
- Out of This World
- Partners
- The Patty Duke Show
- Payne
- Plus One
- Payne
- Petticoat Junction
- The Phil Silvers Show
- Please Don't Eat the Daisies
- Private Benjamin
- Psych
- Queens Supreme
- Raising Hope
- The Real McCoys
- Ridiculousness (10 Shake)
- Roast Battle (10 Shake)
- Robin's Nest
- Roseanne
- Rules of Engagement
- Scream Queens (ELEVEN)
- SCTV
- Seinfeld (originally aired on Nine, 1993–1999, moved to 10 Peach)
- Silver Spoons
- The Single Guy
- Sirens
- The Sketch Show
- Sledge Hammer!
- Some Mothers Do 'Ave 'Em (originally aired on ABC and Seven)
- Something So Right
- Sons of Tucson
- Square Pegs
- Stand By Your Man
- Starting from Scratch
- The Steve Harvey Show
- That Girl
- That's Life
- That's Love
- The Three Stooges
- Three's a Crowd
- Three's Company (originally aired on ABC)
- Throb
- To the Manor Born (originally aired on ABC and Seven)
- Too Close for Comfort
- Topper
- Traffic Light
- Trollied
- Uncle Buck
- The Unicorn (2019 on 10, 2020–2021 on 10 Peach)
- The Waltons
- Wedding Band
- Weird Science
- Who's the Boss?
- Wilfred
- The Wonder Years
- Workaholics (10 Shake)
- Working Girl
- Worst Week
- You Again?
- The Young Ones (originally aired on ABC)

==== Action and adventure ====
- The A-Team
- Adventures in Paradise
- The Adventures of William Tell
- Captain Gallant of the Foreign Legion
- Covington Cross
- Daniel Boone
- Hercules: The Legendary Journeys
- The Incredible Hulk
- Ivanhoe
- The Lost World
- Roar
- Scarecrow and Mrs. King
- The Six Million Dollar Man
- Switch
- Tarzan
- Tropical Heat
- The Wizard
- Wizards and Warriors
- Xena: Warrior Princess
- Zorro (1990)

==== Variety / entertainment ====
- Ant & Dec's Saturday Night Takeaway (2020–2021)
- The Black and White Minstrel Show (1964–1978)
- The Daily Show with Trevor Noah (10 Shake)
- The Ed Sullivan Show
- The Ellen DeGeneres Show (2003–2007, later moved to Nine)
- The Garry Moore Show
- Hootenanny
- The Insider
- The Jerry Springer Show
- Judge Joe Brown
- The Larry Sanders Show
- The Late Late Show with James Corden (2015–2020 on 10 Peach, 2020–2023 on 10 Shake)
- Late Show with David Letterman (2007–2015)
- The Oprah Winfrey Show
- The Phil Donahue Show
- Ricki Lake (later moved to Seven)
- The Roseanne Show
- Tosh.0 (10 Shake)

==== Reality ====
- 100% Hotter (10 Peach)
- American Idol (2002–2007, 2013–2015)
- America's Next Top Model
- Britain & Ireland's Next Top Model
- Catfish: The TV Show (10 Shake)
- Celebrity MasterChef Australia (2009, 2021)
- The Charlotte Show (10 Shake)
- Dating Naked (ELEVEN)
- Electric Dreams
- Ex on the Beach UK (10 Shake)
- The Family
- Fear Factor (10 Shake)
- The Glee Project
- Hell's Kitchen (ONE, moved to Seven)
- How to Look Good Naked (UK)
- How to Look Good Naked (US)
- Ice Road Truckers (moved to 7mate)
- It's Me or the Dog (UK)
- I Wanna Marry "Harry"
- Just Tattoo of Us (10 Shake)
- Kid Nation
- Laguna Beach
- Lip Sync Battle (2020–2023 on 10 Shake)
- The Masked Singer USA
- Mobbed
- Newlyweds: Nick & Jessica
- Oprah's Big Give
- The Osbournes
- Pimp My Ride
- Pirate Master
- Posh Frock Shop (10 Peach)
- Queer Eye for the Straight Guy
- Sally
- So You Think You Can Dance (moved to Fox8)
- Teen Mom USA (2020 on 10 Shake)
- Undercover Boss (10 Bold, moved to 7Bravo)
- World's Wildest Police Videos (moved to Seven)

==== Lifestyle ====
- Jamie at Home
- Jamie Does...
- Jamie Oliver's Food Revolution
- Jamie's 15-Minute Meals
- Jamie's 30-Minute Meals
- Jamie's American Road Trip
- Jamie's Chef
- Jamie's Dream School
- Jamie's Family Christmas
- Jamie's Great Britain
- Jamie's Great Italian Escape
- Jamie's Kitchen
- Jamie's Ministry of Food
- Jamie's School Dinners'
- Jamie's Super Food Family Classic (2016)
- The Naked Chef
- Oliver's Twist
- Pukka Tukka

==== Observational / documentary ====
- Body Story
- Brainiac
- Celebrity Gogglebox USA (2020)
- Cops (1991–2010 on TEN, 2011–2020 on 10 Bold)
- David Attenborough: Animal Attraction
- David Attenborough Specials (10, 10 Bold, moved to Nine/ABC)
- Deadliest Catch
- Crazy About One Direction
- Unsolved Mysteries (originally aired on Seven)
- Attenborough's Ark
- Giant Otters of the Amazon
- Living with Baboons
- One Strange Rock (2019)
- Operation Iceberg
- Snow Babies

==== Game shows ====
- Are You Smarter Than a 5th Grader?
- Don't Forget the Lyrics!
- Identity
- Jeopardy! (2008–2009 series only, on One, moved to SBS)
- Scavengers
- Studs
- Total Wipeout UK (2020–2021 on 10 Shake)

==== Anthology ====
- American Gothic
- FBI: The Untold Stories
- The Hitchhiker
- The Jim Henson Hour
- The Magical World of Disney
- The Wonderful World of Disney

==== Children's ====
- The Abbott and Costello Cartoon Show (originally aired on Seven, later aired on ABC)
- Action Man (1995)
- Action Man (CGI, 2000)
- The Adventures of Chuck and Friends
- The Adventures of Hyperman
- The Adventures of Jimmy Neutron, Boy Genius
- The Adventures of Rin Tin Tin
- The Adventures of Sam & Max: Freelance Police
- Adventures of Sonic the Hedgehog
- The Adventures of T-Rex
- The Adventures of Teddy Ruxpin
- Alias the Jester (originally aired on ABC)
- Alien Racers
- All Grown Up!
- The All-New Dennis the Menace
- The Amazing Spiez!
- Atrezzo
- The All-New Pink Panther Show (later aired on Seven)
- Alvin and the Chipmunks (Ruby-Spears version, Murakami Wolf Swenson/DIC Entertainment version later aired on ABC)
- The Alvin Show (originally aired on ABC, later aired on Seven)
- The Amazing 3
- Anne of Green Gables: The Animated Series
- The Ant and the Aardvark
- Aquaman
- Archie's TV Funnies
- Astro Boy (1960s version only in Melbourne)
- Attack of the Killer Tomatoes
- The Avengers: United They Stand
- B-Daman Crossfire
- Back to the Future
- Bad Dog
- Baggy Pants and the Nitwits
- Bailey Kipper's P.O.V.
- Bakugan Battle Brawlers
- Bakugan: Gundalian Invaders
- Bakugan: Mechtanium Surge
- Bakugan: New Vestroia
- Barbie: Life in the Dreamhouse
- Barney & Friends (originally aired on Nine, only aired on Ten from 1997 to 1998, returned to air on Fox Kids in 2000 to 2003)
- Batfink (later aired on ABC Kids, ABC and ABC2)
- Batman with Robin the Boy Wonder
- Battle of the Planets (later aired on ABC)
- Beakman's World (sometimes shares with Nine)
- The Beatles
- Beethoven
- The Berenstain Bears
- Beverly Hills Teens
- Beyblade
- Beyblade G-Revolution
- Beyblade: Metal Fury
- Beyblade: Metal Fusion
- Beyblade: Metal Masters
- Beyblade: Shogun Steel
- Beyblade V-Force
- BeyWheelz
- Big Bad Beetleborgs
- Big Time Rush (2020–21, 2023–24)
- Biker Mice from Mars (1993)
- Biker Mice From Mars (2006)
- Bionic Six
- Blazing Team: Masters of Yo-Kwon-Do
- Blue Peter
- The Blue Racer
- Bobby's World
- The Brady Kids
- Bratz
- Breadwinners (2020–2022)
- Bruno the Kid
- Bucky O'Hare and the Toad Wars
- Bugs and Daffy's Carnival of the Animals
- Bugs Bunny and Friends
- The Bugs Bunny Show (originally aired on Nine, sometimes airs on Seven in Sydney)
- Bugs Bunny's Looney Christmas Tales (later aired on Nine)
- Bugs Bunny's Thanksgiving Diet
- Bunsen Is a Beast (2021–23)
- Bureau of Alien Detectors
- Button Nose
- Butt-Ugly Martians
- C.A.B.
- C.O.P.S. (originally aired on Nine)
- Cadillacs and Dinosaurs
- Calvin and the Colonel
- Capitol Critters
- Captain N: The Game Master
- Captain Simian and the Space Monkeys
- Captain Zed and the Zee Zone
- Capt'n Sailorbird
- Cardcaptors
- Cardfight!! Vanguard (2018 series)
- Cardfight!! Vanguard G
- Cardfight!! Vanguard G: GIRS Crisis
- Cardfight!! Vanguard G: NEXT
- Cardfight!! Vanguard G: Stride Gate
- Care Bears
- Care Bears: Welcome to Care-a-Lot
- Cartoon All-Stars to the Rescue (Simulcast with Seven Network & Nine Network)
- Casper and Friends
- Casper the Friendly Ghost
- Centurions
- Challenge of the Super Friends
- Chaotic
- Chucklewood Critters
- Clue (mini-series)
- Cockleshell Bay
- Code Lyoko
- Commander Crumbcake
- Conan the Adventurer
- Cool McCool
- A Cosmic Christmas (originally aired on ABC)
- Count Duckula (originally aired on ABC, later aired on 7TWO)
- Courageous Cat and Minute Mouse
- Crackerjack
- Creepy Crawlers
- Crusader Rabbit (originally aired on Seven)
- Crush Gear
- Danger Mouse (originally aired on ABC, later aired on 7TWO)
- Danny Phantom (2024–25)
- Dastardly and Muttley in Their Flying Machines (originally aired on Nine, later aired on Seven)
- Dennis and Gnasher (later aired on GO!)
- Dennis the Menace (1986) (originally aired on ABC)
- Digimon
- Dink, the Little Dinosaur
- Dinofroz
- Dinosaur King
- Dofus
- Dog City
- Donkey Kong Country
- Dork Hunters from Outer Space
- Doug (1991–1994 version)
- Dragon Ball GT
- Dragon Ball Z (Funimation/Saban dub)
- Dragon Flyz
- Dragon's Lair
- The Drakers
- Dr. Fad
- Droids (also airs on Nine in Perth)
- Duel Masters (later aired on Seven)
- The Dukes
- Dungeons & Dragons (originally aired on Seven)
- Eagle Riders
- Earthworm Jim
- Eek! and the Terrible Thunderlizards
- Eek! The Cat
- Eekstravaganza
- The Electric Company (later aired on ABC and SBS)
- Eon Kid
- Ewoks
- Exosquad
- Extreme Dinosaurs
- Extreme Ghostbusters
- Fables of the Green Forest
- Fangface
- Fantastic Four (1978 series)
- Fantastic Four (1994 series)
- Fantomcat
- Fat Albert and the Cosby Kids
- Felix the Cat (originally aired on ABC, shares with Seven)
- Fievel's American Tails
- The Flintstones (originally aired on Seven, sometimes airs on Nine, returned to air on Seven later during the mid-1970s)
- Fraggle Rock (later aired on ABC, ABC1 and ABC2)
- Fudge
- Funky Fables
- The Funny Company
- Gadget and the Gadgetinis
- Gadget Boy & Heather
- Game Shakers (2021–23)
- Garfield and Friends
- George of the Jungle
- Geronimo Stilton
- The Ghost of Faffner Hall
- Gigantor
- Gilligan's Planet
- Godzilla
- GGO Football
- GoGoRiki
- Goldie Gold and Action Jack
- Goober and the Ghost Chasers
- Goosebumps
- Gophers!
- Gormiti: The Lords of Nature Return
- Gormiti Nature Unleashed
- The Great Space Coaster
- Groovie Goolies (shares with Seven and Nine)
- Hamtaro
- Hanazuki: Full of Treasures
- Hans Christian Andersen
- Harvey Beaks (2020–2021)
- The Haunted Hathaways (2021–2022)
- He-Man and the Masters of the Universe (2002 series)
- Heathcliff
- Heckle and Jeckle
- Hector Heathcote
- Here Comes the Grump
- Hero: 108
- The Hilarious House of Frightenstein
- Hoppity Hooper
- Horseland
- Hot Wheels
- Hot Wheels Battle Force 5
- How to Rock (2021–22)
- Hulk Hogan's Rock 'n' Wrestling
- Hunter Street (2020)
- Huntik: Secrets & Seekers
- I Am Frankie (2021)
- I Am the Greatest: The Adventures of Muhammad Ali
- iCarly (2009–16, 2020–24)
- The Incredible Hulk (1982)
- Inspector Gadget (originally aired on ABC)
- Iron Man
- It's Pony (2023)
- Jackie Chan Adventures
- Jackson 5ive
- Jamie and the Magic Torch (originally aired on ABC)
- Jem
- Joe 90
- Johnny Cypher in Dimension Zero
- Jonny Quest (later aired on Seven)
- Journey to the Center of the Earth
- Julius Jr.
- Jumanji
- The Kids from Room 402
- King Arthur and the Knights of Justice
- The King Kong Show
- King Leonardo and His Short Subjects (originally aired on ABC, later aired on Seven and Nine)
- Kum-Kum
- Lalaloopsy
- Land of the Lost (1974)
- Lassie
- A Laurel and Hardy Cartoon (originally aired on ABC)
- Legend of the Dragon
- The Legend of Zelda
- Linus the Lionhearted
- Little Mouse on the Prairie
- The Little Vampire
- Little Wizards
- The Littles (originally aired on Nine)
- The Littlest Hobo
- The Littl' Bits
- The Lone Ranger Cartoon
- Looney Tunes (usually airs on Nine)
- The Magic of Herself the Elf
- The Magic School Bus (later aired on ABC Kids and ABC)
- The Magical World of Gigi
- Magilla Gorilla (later aired on Nine and Seven)
- Marine Boy (sometimes shares with Nine)
- The Marvel Action Hour
- M.A.S.K. (originally aired on Nine)
- Matt Hatter Chronicles
- Max Steel (2000 series)
- Medabots
- MegaMan NT Warrior
- Men in Black: The Series
- Merrie Melodies (usually airs on Nine)
- Mew Mew Power (moved to Boomerang Australia)
- Middlemost Post (2023)
- The Mighty Hercules
- Mighty Man and Yukk
- Mighty Mouse
- Mighty Mouse and Friends
- Milton the Monster
- Mission: Magic!
- Misterjaw
- A Monster Christmas
- A Monster Easter
- Monster Force
- Monster High
- Monster Rancher
- Moon Jumper
- Mr. T
- Mrs. Piggle-Wiggle
- Muppet Babies
- My Life as a Teenage Robot
- My Little Pony: Friendship Is Magic (moved to 9Go!)
- My Secret Identity
- Naruto (Season 1 only)
- The New 3 Stooges
- The New Adventures of Batman
- The New Adventures of Gilligan
- The New Adventures of Speed Racer
- The New Adventures of Superman
- The New Archies (originally aired on Nine)
- The New Fantastic Four
- The New Woody Woodpecker Show
- Nicky, Ricky, Dicky & Dawn (2020–2023)
- Ninja Turtles: The Next Mutation
- One Piece (2006–2008)
- OWL/TV
- Pac-Man and the Ghostly Adventures
- Paradise Café (2011–13)
- The Penguins of Madagascar (moved to ABC Entertains)
- Pet Alien
- Peter Pan and the Pirates
- Piggsburg Pigs!
- Pink Panther and Sons
- The Pink Panther Show (later aired on Seven)
- Pitfall!
- The Plastic Man Comedy/Adventure Show
- Pokémon (Season 1–19, 1998–2012 on TEN, 2012–2018 on ELEVEN, moved to ABC3)
- Popeye
- The Porky Pig Show (originally aired on Nine, sometimes airs on Seven in Sydney)
- Pound Puppies (1986) (Victoria only, originally aired on Seven)
- Prince Planet
- Problem Child
- Project G.e.e.K.e.R.
- Puppy in My Pocket: Adventures in Pocketville
- The Puppy's New Adventures
- Rainbow (also airs on Seven and Nine)
- Rainbow Brite
- Rarg
- Ratz
- The Real Ghostbusters (later aired on Nine)
- Red Planet
- Redakai: Conquer the Kairu
- Rekkit Rabbit
- Rentaghost
- Rescue Heroes
- Rickety Rocket
- RoboRoach
- Robotech (later aired on Seven)
- Rocky and Bullwinkle (originally aired on Nine, was later aired again on Nine and later on Seven and ABC)
- Rocket Power (later aired on ABC3, now airing on Nickelodeon/Nick at Nite)
- Rod Rocket
- RollBots
- Rubik, the Amazing Cube
- Rude Dog and the Dweebs
- Rugrats (including TV specials, simultaneously aired on ABC, later aired on ABC3)
- Sailor Moon (originally aired on Seven, DIC Dub)
- Sam & Cat (2020–2022, 2024)
- Sanjay and Craig (2016–2019, 2020–2023)
- The Savage Dragon
- Scan2Go
- Scaredy Squirrel
- Scruffy
- The Secret Files of the Spy Dogs
- The Secret Lives of Waldo Kitty (usually airs on Nine)
- Shazam!
- Shelley Duvall's Bedtime Stories
- The Shirley Temple Show
- Sidekick
- Silver Surfer
- Sinbad Jr. and his Magic Belt (originally aired on ABC)
- Skeleton Warriors
- Sky Dancers
- Skyhawks
- Slugterra
- Sonic X
- Space Academy
- Space Ace (manga)
- Space Ace (Saturday Supercade cartoon)
- Space Angel
- Space Ghost (originally aired on Nine, later aired on Seven)
- Space Goofs
- Space Sentinels
- The Spectacular Spider-Man
- Speed Racer (originally aired on ABC, later aired on Seven, ABC Kids and ABC2)
- Spider-Man (1967 series)
- Spider-Man (1981 series)
- Spider-Man: The Animated Series
- Spider-Man Unlimited
- Spider-Woman
- The Spooktacular New Adventures of Casper
- Star Trek: Prodigy (2022–2023)
- Star Wars: Clone Wars (2003)
- Star Wars: The Clone Wars (2008); Season 1 only; later moved to ABC3)
- Steel Riders
- The Storyteller (later aired on ABC)
- Strawberry Shortcake
- Street Sharks
- Stuart Little: The Animated Series
- Super Friends
- Super President
- Superhuman Samurai Syber-Squad
- Superior Defender Gundam Force
- Take Hart
- Tales from the Cryptkeeper
- Tarzan, Lord of the Jungle
- Teenage Mutant Ninja Turtles (2003 series) (moved to Boomerang Australia)
- Teknoman
- Tenko and the Guardians of the Magic
- Tennessee Tuxedo and His Tales
- Thundarr the Barbarian (later aired on Seven)
- Thunder
- Thunderbirds (usually airs on Nine)
- ThunderCats (1985) (Victoria only, originally aired on Seven in Sydney in 1986, didn't air on Seven in Victoria until 1989)
- The Tick
- Tickety Toc
- The Tomfoolery Show
- Top Cat (airs only in Adelaide, originally aired on Nine, later aired on Seven)
- Totally Spies! (2005–2008 on Ten, 2018–present on 10 Comedy)
- Transformers
- Transformers: Animated
- Transformers: Armada
- Transformers: Cybertron
- Transformers: Energon
- Transformers: Generation 2
- Transformers: Prime (miniseries) (moved to Boomerang Australia)
- Transformers: Robots in Disguise (2001 series)
- Transformers: Robots in Disguise (2015 series)
- Travellers by Night
- Treasure Island
- Trollz
- T.U.F.F. Puppy (2022)
- Turbo Teen
- Underdog
- Victorious (2011–17, 2020–24)
- Vid Kids
- Viva Piñata
- Vor-Tech: Undercover Conversion Squad
- VR Troopers
- Wacky Races (originally aired on Nine, later aired on Seven)
- Wake, Rattle, and Roll
- Walter Melon
- Watch Mr. Wizard
- We All Have Tales
- What's New, Mr. Magoo?
- Where on Earth Is Carmen Sandiego?
- WildC.A.T.S.
- Willow Town
- Wing Commander Academy
- Winx Club (moved to GO!)
- WITS Academy (2021)
- The Wizard of Oz
- Wizards
- Wyatt Earp
- X-Men
- Xiaolin Chronicles
- Yogi's Gang (usually airs on Seven)
- Yu-Gi-Oh! (Moved on 9Go!)
- Yu-Gi-Oh! 5D's
- Yu-Gi-Oh! GX
- Zoids (Cheez TV was the first Western station to air the final four episodes of the Zoids: Chaotic Century series in its English language version)
- Zoids: Chaotic Century
- Zorro: Generation Z

==== Preschool ====
- Abby Hatcher (2021–2023)
- Bernard (2018)
- Butterbean's Café (2020–2023)
- Care Bears & Cousins
- Corn & Peg (2021–2023)
- Deer Squad (2023)
- Dinosaur Train (later aired on ABC Kids)
- Dora and Friends (2021–2023)
- Dora the Explorer (2020–2023)
- Fresh Beat Band of Spies (2020–21)
- Littlest Pet Shop (2012 series)
- Maya the Bee
- Mia and Me
- Pound Puppies (2010 series)
- Super Wings (later aired on 9Go!)
- Strawberry Shortcake's Berry Bitty Adventures
- Team Umizoomi (2020–2023)
- Tickety Toc
- Transformers: Rescue Bots (2013–2017, 2021)
- Tree Fu Tom (later aired on ABC Kids)

==== Sports ====
- American football: NFL, Super Bowl (2009–2014)
- Baseball: Major League Baseball including Postseason, World Series (2009–2013)
- Basketball: NBA (1993–1999, 2008–2011)
- Cricket: Indian Premier League (2008–2010), Champions League Twenty20 (2009–2010, 2013)
- Golf: U.S. Open, U.S. Masters, Ryder Cup
- Motor Racing: NASCAR
- WWE (1997–2000, moved to FOX8 & 9Go!)

==== Annual events ====
- Grammy Awards (2021)
- Primetime Emmy Awards (moved to Fox8)
- Teen Choice Awards

==== Religious ====
- Bayless Conley
- Christian City TV
- Crossing Over with John Edward
- Hillsong
- Jesus Television
- Kenneth Copeland
- Key of David
- Life Today with James Robison (moved to 7flix)
- This is Your Day with Benny Hinn

==== Other ====
- Around Midnight
- Australian Property Hotspots
- Bread
- Cactus Garden
- Chilli Factor
- Closer Look With Kevin Trudeau
- Cool Aid
- Creative Living
- Danoz
- Discover Down Under
- Drive Safe
- Feds: The War Against Crime
- Free TV
- Good Sex
- Guinness World Records
- In Entertainment
- In History's Page
- Kenny's World Tour Of Toilets
- Medical Investigation
- Nolan & Owen
- Outback Stripper
- Swami Sarasvati (Sydney only)
- Switched on Living (Sydney only)
- What The Hell Just Happened? (2021)
- What The Hell Happens Next? (2021)
- Why Dig That Up!
- Wild Weekends
- A Year to Remember
- Yoga TV
- Zoo
- Zoo Babies With Whoopi Goldberg

== See also ==
- List of programs broadcast by ABC (Australian TV network)
- List of programs broadcast by Nine Network
- List of programs broadcast by Special Broadcasting Service
- List of programs broadcast by Seven Network
- List of Australian television series
