= Behind the News (disambiguation) =

Behind the News is a children's news programme broadcast on ABC TV in Australia.

Behind the News may also refer to:

- Behind the News (film), a 1940 American drama film
- Behind the News, a radio program hosted by Doug Henwood since 1996
