= Adrian Richardson =

Australian chef

- Occupations: Chef, restaurateur, television presenter
- Known for: Good Chef Bad Chef

Adrian Richardson is an Australian chef and television presenter. Richardson has hosted a number of food shows and is most widely known for being the Bad Chef in Good Chef Bad Chef and appearing with chefs Manu Feildel, Gary Mehigan and Miguel Maestre in Boys Weekend. He is owner and head chef at the La Luna restaurant in North Carlton and Bouvier Bar in Brunswick, Melbourne.

== Career ==
Richardson started working in cafes to pay for pilot lessons. He obtained his pilots license when he was 16.

=== Chef ===
Richardson started in Melbourne at the Victoria Arts Centre and has worked at Le Restaurant at The Regent Hotel, and O’Connell's Hotel with Greg Malouf.

=== Television ===
Year	Title	Role	Notes
2006	Jamie's Kitchen Australia	Guest	
2009	Boys Weekend	Presenter	13 episodes
	The Circle	Guest	
	Mornings	Guest	
	9am with David & Kim	Guest	
2011–2023	Good Chef Bad Chef	Presenter	844 episodes
	Secret Meat Business	Presenter	
2012	MasterChef Australia All-Stars	Guest chef	
2013	Iron Chef America	Guest chef	
2016	The Outback Steakhouse, USA	Presenter	
2018	Richos Bar Snacks	Presenter	

=== Books ===
- MEAT, Hardcover (2008):
- The Good Life, Pan Macmillan, Hardcover (2011).

== Personal life ==
Richardson has a family history of chefs. He went to school at Penleigh and Essendon Grammar School. His grandfather ran the Balzac restaurant in East Melbourne and he has uncles who were also chefs.
