= List of awards and nominations received by Guy Pearce =

Guy Pearce awards and nominations
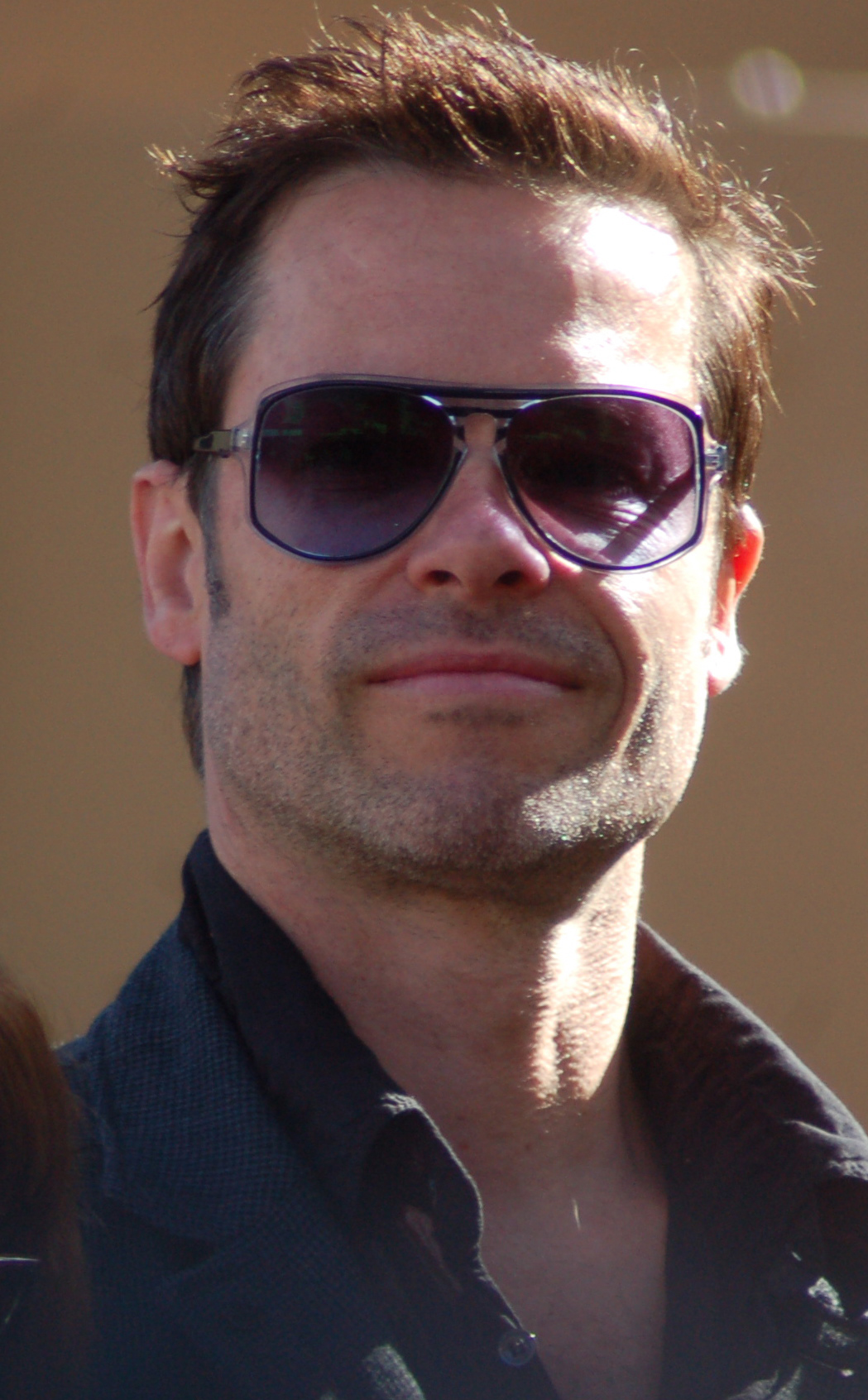
- Pearce in 2011
Awards and nominations
Award	Wins	Nominations
Academy Awards	0	1
Actor Awards	1	3
BAFTA Awards	0	1
Emmy Awards	1	2
Golden Globe Awards	0	2

Totals (Note: Certain award groups do not simply award one winner. They acknowledge several different recipients, have runners-up, and have third place. Since this is a specific recognition and is different from losing an award, runner-up mentions are considered wins in this award tally. For simplification and to avoid errors, each award in this list has been presumed to have had a prior nomination.)
- Wins: 6
- Nominations: 24

Australian actor Guy Pearce has been recognised with multiple awards and nominations for his work in film and television. He has received a Primetime Emmy Award and an Actor Award as well as nominations for a Daytime Emmy Award and a Golden Globe Award.

On television, he received the Primetime Emmy Award for Outstanding Supporting Actor in a Limited or Anthology Series or Movie and Golden Globe Award for Best Supporting Actor – Series, Miniseries or Television Film for his role in the HBO miniseries Mildred Pierce (2011). For the role he was also nominated for the Actor Award for Outstanding Performance by a Male Actor in a Miniseries or Television Movie.

== Major associations ==
=== Academy Awards ===
Year	Category	Nominated work	Result	Ref.
2025	Best Supporting Actor	The Brutalist	Nominated	

=== Actor Awards ===
Year	Category	Nominated work	Result	Ref.
1998	Outstanding Cast in a Motion Picture	L.A. Confidential	Nominated	
2011	Outstanding Cast in a Motion Picture	The King's Speech	Won	
2012	Outstanding Actor in a Miniseries or TV Movie	Mildred Pierce	Nominated	

=== BAFTA Awards ===
Year	Category	Nominated work	Result	Ref.
British Academy Film Awards
2025	Best Actor in a Supporting Role	The Brutalist	Nominated	

=== Emmy Awards ===
Year	Category	Nominated work	Result	Ref.
Primetime Emmy Awards
2011	Outstanding Supporting Actor in a Limited Series or Movie	Mildred Pierce	Won	
Daytime Emmy Awards
2024	Outstanding Guest Performer in a Drama Series	Neighbours	Nominated	

=== Golden Globe Awards ===
Year	Category	Nominated work	Result	Ref.
2012	Best Supporting Actor – Television	Mildred Pierce	Nominated	
2025	Best Supporting Actor – Motion Picture	The Brutalist	Nominated	

== Industry awards ==
=== Australian Academy of Cinema and Television Arts ===
Year	Category	Nominated work	Result	Ref.
Australian Film Institute Awards
2005	Best Lead Actor	The Proposition	Nominated	
2008	Best Lead Actor	Death Defying Acts	Nominated	
2009	International Award for Best Actor	Bedtime Stories	Nominated	
2010	Best Supporting Actor	Animal Kingdom	Nominated	
AACTA Awards
2013	Best Lead Actor	33 Postcards	Nominated	
2015	Best Lead Actor	The Rover	Nominated	
2021	Best Lead Actor in a Drama	Jack Irish	Nominated	
2024	Best Supporting Actor in a Drama	The Clearing	Nominated	
2025	Best Lead Actor in Film	The Convert	Nominated	
AACTA International Awards
2025	Best Supporting Actor	The Brutalist	Won	

=== British Independent Film Awards ===
Year	Category	Nominated work	Result	Ref.
2010	Best Supporting Actor	The King's Speech	Nominated	

=== Gotham Awards ===
Year	Category	Nominated work	Result	Ref.
2009	Best Ensemble Performance	The Hurt Locker	Won	
2024	Outstanding Supporting Performance	The Brutalist	Nominated	

=== Logie Awards ===
Year	Category	Nominated work	Result	Ref.
2022	Silver Logie Award for Most Popular Actor	Jack Irish	Won	

== Critics awards ==
=== Australian Film Critics Association ===
Year	Category	Nominated work	Result	Ref.
2015	Best Actor	The Rover	Nominated	

=== Boston Society of Film Critics ===
Year	Category	Nominated work	Result	Ref.
2001	Best Actor	Memento	Nominated	

=== Chicago Film Critics Association ===
Year	Category	Nominated work	Result	Ref.
1997	Most Promising Actor	L.A. Confidential	Nominated	
2001	Best Actor	Memento	Nominated	

=== Online Film Critics Society ===
Year	Category	Nominated work	Result	Ref.
2001	Best Actor	Memento	Nominated	

=== Phoenix Film Critics Society ===
Year	Category	Nominated work	Result	Ref.
2001	Best Actor	Memento	Nominated	
2010	Best Ensemble Cast	The King's Speech	Nominated	

=== San Diego Film Critics Society ===
Year	Category	Nominated work	Result	Ref.
2001	Best Actor	Memento	Won	

=== Saturn Awards ===
Year	Category	Nominated work	Result	Ref.
2001	Best Actor	Memento	Nominated	
