= Boys Weekend =

- Genre: Cooking
- Presented by: Gary Mehigan; Manu Feildel; Miguel Maestre; Adrian Richardson
- Country of origin: Australia
- Original language: English
- No. of series: 1
- No. of episodes: 13

Production
- Running time: 30 minutes

Original release
- Network: Network Ten; LifeStyle Food food network
- Release: 2009

Boys Weekend is an Australian cooking television series that originally aired in 2009 on Australia's Network Ten. The 13-part series was hosted by the four Australian-based chefs Gary Mehigan, Manu Feildel, Miguel Maestre and Adrian Richardson, who visit different locations across Australia to sample and cook local produce. The series was sold to more than 100 countries and a DVD of the series was released in 2010. The four chefs have since become regular hosts on Australian TV, with Maestre on The Living Room, Feildel on My Kitchen Rules, Mehigan on MasterChef Australia and Richardson on Good Chef Bad Chef. In March 2016 the series started screening on the SBS Food Network.

== See also ==
- List of Australian television series
- List of cooking shows
