= Mike Reid (chef) =

British chef (born 1982)

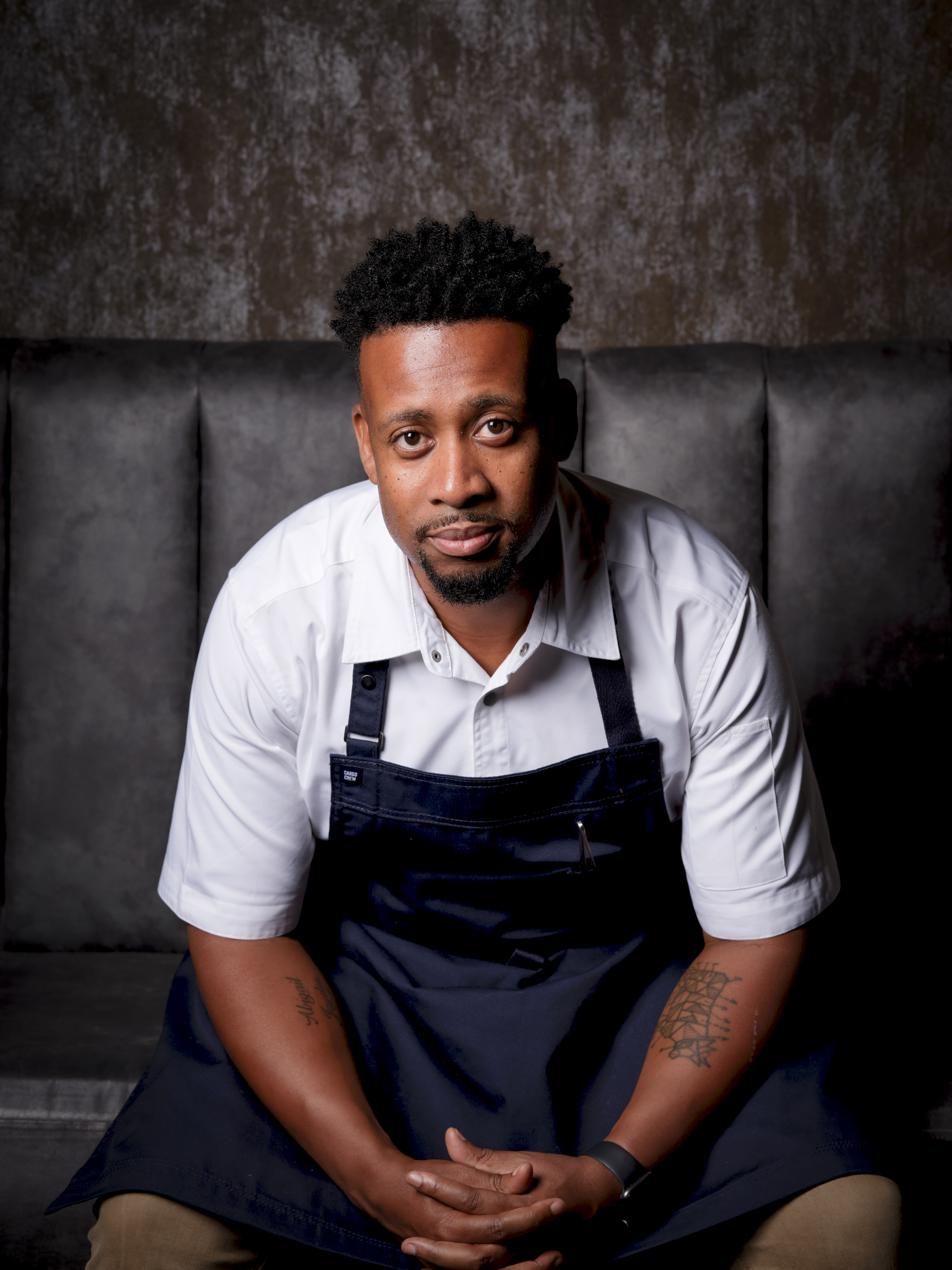
- Born: 15 August 1982 (age 43)
- Occupation: Chef
- Known for: Co-host of My Market Kitchen and Ten Minute Kitchen
- Website: https://mikereidchef.com/

Mike Reid (born 15 August 1982) is a British chef, restaurateur and television presenter, known for his work across the UK and Australia. He is a judge on the Channel 4 and Netflix series Five Star Kitchen and appears as a chef expert on the primetime Channel 5 series Taste Test Restaurant. Reid is also a presenter on Foxtel’s travel and food series Luxury Escapes: The World’s Best Holidays. In Australia, he has co-hosted My Market Kitchen and Ten Minute Kitchen and is a presenter on Channel 10’s Good Chef Bad Chef.

Reid also appeared as a chef on the BBC revival of Ready Steady Cook in 2020.

== Career ==
After graduating from the University of Portsmouth, Reid moved to London, where he began his career as a chef. He worked as an apprenticeship at The In & Out club in St James's and later worked in the kitchens of the Royal Air Force Club. He worked in Le Gavroche and Restaurant Gordon Ramsay under the tutelage of notable chefs such as Michel Roux Jr, Simone Zanoni and Gordon Ramsay.

In 2007, Reid joined the team at Gaucho restaurants and later became the head chef there. He managed both the Richmond and O2 sites before he was promoted to the topmost position for the entire Gaucho Group.

In 2013, Reid left London and moved to Melbourne where he worked in Attica alongside the celebrity chef Ben Shewry. He also worked in Andrew McConnell’s 2 Hat restaurant Cutler and Co. In 2014, Reid worked with celebrity chef Shannon Bennett and his Vue de Monde group to open Jardin Tan. In 2014, he returned to the United Kingdom and opened a restaurant in London tagged M. In 2015, he opened the second M restaurant in Victoria Street.

Reid wrote his first cookbook titled M a 24 Hour Cookbook which was published in 2016 by Bloomsbury Publishing. In 2016, he started appearing on Channel 4's Sunday Brunch live TV show as guest chef. He also appeared on the BBC Great British Menu representing the London and South East region against the countries best chefs. He featured on Master chef on BBC One and Tricks of the Restaurant Trade on Channel 4.

In 2017, Reid opened the third M restaurant in Twickenham. In 2019, he started overseeing the newly formed Rare Restaurants which encompasses both Gaucho and M restaurants.

Reid features as a guest alongside James Martin on Saturday’s Kitchen in the UK, and Justine Schofield on Everyday Gourmet, and Diana Chan on Asia Unplated in Australia.
