= The $20 Challenge =

The $20 Challenge was an Australian reality television series that was broadcast on the Network Ten in 2000. The show was hosted by Tim Bailey, and saw four Australians trying to survive in a foreign country with nothing but $20 to their name.

The eventual winner was Rhiannon Kelly-Pearce. The show was the first television role for James Mathison.

== See also ==
- List of Australian television series
- List of Network Ten programs
