= Guy Pearce =

Australian actor (born 1967)

- Pearce in 2026
- Born: Guy Edward Pearce; 5 October 1967 (age 59); Ely, Cambridgeshire, England
- Occupation: Actor
- Years active: 1985–present
- Spouse: Kate Mestitz (m. 1997; div. 2015)
- Partner: Carice van Houten (2015–2025)
- Children: 1
- Awards: Full list

Guy Edward Pearce (born 5 October 1967) is an Australian actor. His accolades include a Primetime Emmy Award, as well as nominations for an Academy Award, a BAFTA Award, two Golden Globe Awards and eight AACTA Awards.

Born in Cambridgeshire, England, and raised in Geelong, Australia, Pearce received international attention for his break-out roles in The Adventures of Priscilla, Queen of the Desert (1994), L.A. Confidential (1997), Ravenous (1999), and Memento (2000). His subsequent roles were in The Time Machine (2002), The Count of Monte Cristo (2002), Bedtime Stories (2008), The Road (2009), The Hurt Locker (2009), The King's Speech (2010), Lawless (2012), and Mary Queen of Scots (2018).

He portrayed Peter Weyland in Prometheus (2012) and Alien: Covenant (2017), and played Aldrich Killian in the Marvel Cinematic Universe movie Iron Man 3 (2013). In Australian cinema he has acted in The Proposition (2005), Animal Kingdom (2010), The Rover (2014), and Swinging Safari (2018). For his performance as a wealthy industrialist in The Brutalist (2024), he received Academy Award and BAFTA Award nominations for Best Supporting Actor.

On television, he has played the title role in the series of films Jack Irish (2012–2021). Pearce co-starred alongside Kate Winslet in the HBO miniseries Mildred Pierce (2011) and Mare of Easttown (2021). The former won him a Primetime Emmy Award for Outstanding Supporting Actor.

== Early life and education ==
Guy Edward Pearce was born on 5 October 1967 in Ely, Cambridgeshire, England. His father, Stuart Pearce, was a Royal New Zealand Air Force pilot and RAF test pilot, and his mother, Anne Cocking (née Pickering), was an English schoolteacher. He has an elder sister, Tracy. When Pearce was three years old, the family relocated to Geelong, Victoria, Australia. When he was eight years old, Pearce's father died in an aircraft accident.

Pearce attended Geelong College, and was a member of the Geelong Society of Operatic and Dramatic Arts Junior Players. His mother was a keen theatre goer, Pearce would accompany her. He began appearing in amateur theatre productions from the age of 11, such as The King and I, Alice in Wonderland, and The Wizard of Oz. At the age of 16, he was a competitive amateur bodybuilder, leading to the title of Junior Mr. Victoria.

His first film appearance, while still at Geelong College, was in a film titled Life and Study at University, produced and directed by Peter Lane of Deakin University.

== Career ==
=== Film and television ===
Pearce transitioned to television when he was cast in the Australian soap opera Neighbours in 1986, playing the role of Mike Young for three years. He reprised the role in 2022 for the show's then final episode, and returned to make multiple guest appearances in the revival from 2023 to 2024. Pearce also found roles in other television series such as Home and Away (1988) and Snowy River: The McGregor Saga (1993).

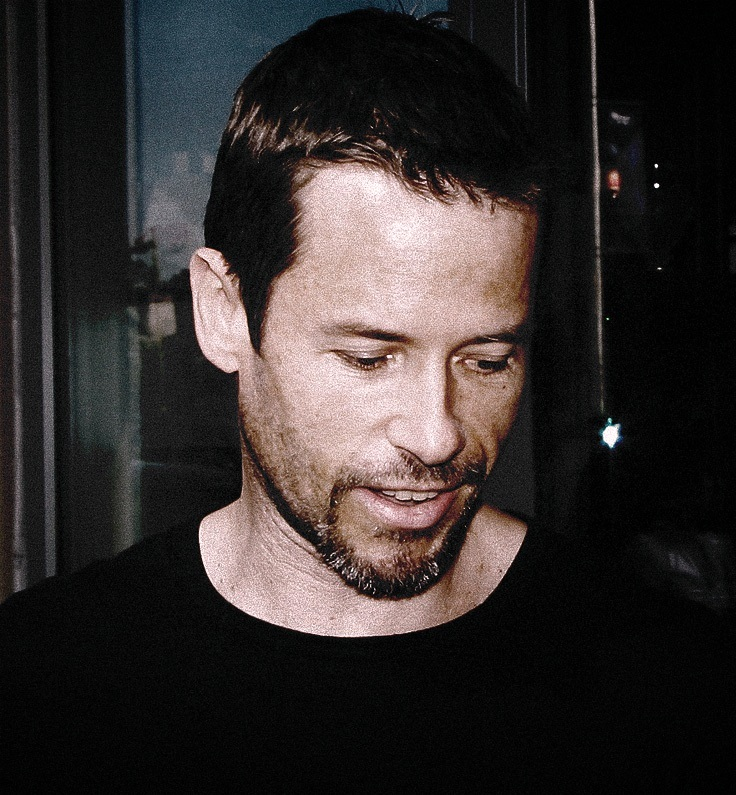
Pearce at the 2007 Toronto International Film Festival

The director/producer/writer Frank Howson cast Pearce in his first three films, Heaven Tonight, Hunting, and Flynn, and paid for him to go to the Cannes Film Festival in 1991 for the premiere of the Howson-directed Hunting. The accompanying Howson-funded publicity campaign brought Pearce to the attention of the international film industry. He made his first major film breakthrough shortly after, with his role as a drag queen in The Adventures of Priscilla, Queen of the Desert in 1994. Since then, he has appeared in several US productions including L.A. Confidential, Ravenous, Rules of Engagement, Memento, The Count of Monte Cristo, and The Time Machine.

Pearce portrayed pop artist Andy Warhol in Factory Girl and Harry Houdini in Death Defying Acts. He also appeared in The Road and in Bedtime Stories with Adam Sandler. Pearce continued to perform in Australian films, such as The Hard Word (2002) and The Proposition (2005), written by fellow Australian Nick Cave.

In January 2009, Pearce returned to the stage after a seven-year absence. He performed in the Melbourne Theatre Company's production of Poor Boy, a play with music, co-written by Matt Cameron and Tim Finn. In 2009, he portrayed Staff Sergeant Matthew Thompson in The Hurt Locker. In 2010, he appeared as David, Prince of Wales, who became Edward VIII, in The King's Speech. Both films won the Academy Award for Best Picture, making Pearce the first actor to appear in back-to-back Best Picture winners since Michael Peña (who appeared in Million Dollar Baby and Crash).

Pearce starred as the eponymous lead in the Australian TV miniseries Jack Irish, an adaptation of the detective novels of author Peter Temple broadcast on the ABC network in 2012. In May 2012, Pearce was cast to star in David Michôd's The Rover. In 2013, Pearce played the villain character Aldrich Killian in Iron Man 3. Pearce appeared in a documentary special celebrating Neighbours' 30th anniversary, Neighbours 30th: The Stars Reunite, which aired in Australia and the UK in 2015. Pearce had a supporting role in Neil Armfield's 2015 romantic-drama film Holding the Man. Pearce later joined the epic period drama The Brutalist (2024), which was directed by Brady Corbet. He received widespread acclaim for his performance, and he received nominations for the Golden Globe Award, British Academy Film Award, and Academy Award for Best Supporting Actor.

In 2026, Pearce starred in the post-apocalyptic action thriller The Dog Stars, which reunited him with director Ridley Scott. Later that year, he starred as Rupert Murdoch in Danny Boyle's Ink, which was adapted from the play of the same name.

=== Music ===
In 1989, Pearce released the single "Call of the Wild" from the soundtrack Heaven Tonight. The song peaked at number 156 on the ARIA Charts. He appeared in Australian band Silverchair's music video for "Across the Night" and in Razorlight's video for "Before I Fall to Pieces." Pearce recorded the soundtrack for A Slipping-Down Life, singing and playing guitar on cover versions of songs by Ron Sexsmith, Vic Chesnutt and Robyn Hitchcock. Pearce released his first album, Broken Bones, in November 2014. Pearce released his second studio album, The Nomad, in 2018.

== Personal life ==
Pearce married his childhood sweetheart, psychologist Kate Mestitz, in March 1997. In October 2015, Pearce announced that he and his wife of eighteen years had divorced. In the same year, Pearce revealed that he was in a relationship with Dutch actress Carice van Houten; they had a son in August 2016. In January 2025, Van Houten stated that she and Pearce had separated, and have "... not been a couple for years". The couple did not share when their relationship ended.

In February 2025, Pearce accused his L.A. Confidential co-star Kevin Spacey of sexually harassing him while filming the movie. Spacey responded to the accusation by posting a video on the social media platform X, in which he told Pearce to "grow up" and said he was "not a victim."

Pearce has supported charitable organisations relating to animal conservation and habitat preservation as well as publicly expressing his solidarity with Palestine during the Gaza war. He is a signatory of the Film Workers for Palestine boycott pledge that was published in September 2025. In late 2025, Pearce shared posts on social media for which he later apologised, including material from Holocaust-denying white supremacist Nick Fuentes. Pearce later told Jewish News he had inadvertently re-posted content containing "misinformation and falsehoods”. He issued an apology and said that he would be leaving social media for some time.

== Acting credits ==
Key
†	Denotes films that have not yet been released

=== Film ===
Year	Title	Role	Notes
1990	Heaven Tonight	Paul Dysart	
1991	Hunting	Sharp	
1994	The Adventures of Priscilla, Queen of the Desert	Adam Whitely / Felicia Jollygoodfellow	
1996	Dating the Enemy	Brett/Tash	
1997	Flynn	Errol Flynn	
1997	L.A. Confidential	Detective Lieutenant Ed Exley	
1998	Brand New World	Jimmy Compton	aka Woundings
1999	Ravenous	Captain John Boyd	
1999	A Slipping-Down Life	"Drumstrings" Casey	
2000	Rules of Engagement	Major Mark Biggs	
2000	Memento	Leonard Shelby	
2002	The Hard Word	Dale	
2002	The Time Machine	Alexander Hartdegen	
2002	The Count of Monte Cristo	Fernand Mondego	
2002	Till Human Voices Wake Us	Dr. Sam Franks	
2004	Two Brothers	Aidan McRory	
2005	The Proposition	Charlie Burns	
2006	First Snow	Jimmy Starks	
2006	Factory Girl	Andy Warhol	
2008	Death Defying Acts	Harry Houdini	
2008	Winged Creatures	Dr. Bruce Laraby	
2008	Traitor	FBI Agent Roy Clayton	
2008	Bedtime Stories	Kendall	
2009	In Her Skin	Mr. Barber	aka I Am You
2009	The Road	The Veteran	
2009	The Hurt Locker	Staff Sergeant Matt Thompson	
2010	The King's Speech	King Edward VIII	
2010	Animal Kingdom	Detective Nathan Leckie	
2011	33 Postcards	Dean Randall	
2011	Don't Be Afraid of the Dark	Alex Hirst	
2011	Seeking Justice	Simon	
2012	Lockout	Marion Snow	
2012	TED 2023	Peter Weyland	Short film
2012	Prometheus	Peter Weyland	
2012	Lawless	Special Deputy Charley Rakes	
2013	Breathe In	Keith Reynolds	
2013	Iron Man 3	Aldrich Killian	
2013	Hateship, Loveship	Ken Gaudette	
2014	The Rover	Eric	
2015	Results	Trevor	
2015	Holding the Man	Dick Conigrave	
2015	Lorne	Lorne	Short film
2015	Equals	Jonas	
2016	Genius	F. Scott Fitzgerald	
2016	Brimstone	Reverend	
2017	Alien: Covenant	Peter Weyland	Uncredited
2018	Swinging Safari	Keith Hall	
2018	The Catcher Was a Spy	Robert Furman	
2018	Spinning Man	Evan Birch	
2018	Mary Queen of Scots	William Cecil	
2019	Domino	Joe Martin	
2019	The Last Vermeer	Han van Meegeren	
2020	Disturbing the Peace	Jim Dillon	
2020	Bloodshot	Dr. Emil Harting	
2021	The Seventh Day	Peter Costello	
2021	Without Remorse	Secretary Thomas Clay	
2021	Zone 414	David Carmichael	
2021	Back to the Outback	Frank (voice)	
2022	Memory	Vincent Serra	
2022	The Infernal Machine	Bruce Cogburn	
2023	The Convert	Thomas Munro	
2024	Sunrise	Reynolds	
2024	The Shrouds	Maury	
2024	Inside	Warren Murfett	
2024	The Brutalist	Harrison Lee Van Buren	
2025	Killing Faith	Dr. Bender	
2025	The Woman in Cabin 10	Richard Bullmer	
2026	The Dog Stars	Pops	
2026	Ink	Rupert Murdoch	
TBA	Blurred †		Post-production
TBA	The Price of Peace †	Harry S. Truman	Post-production
TBA	The Road Home †	Trevor Huddleston	Post-production
TBA	The Marshal †	Clay Mercer	Post-production
TBA	High End †	Nigel	Post-production
TBA	The Reception †		Filming
TBA	The Neverending Pillow Fort †	Uncle Joe (voice)	Filming
TBA	Priscilla Queen of the Desert 2 †	Adam Whitely / Felicia Jollygoodfellow	Filming

=== Television ===
Year	Title	Role	Notes
1986–89, 2022–24	Neighbours	Mike Young	
1991	Home and Away	David Croft	12 episodes
1994–1996	Snowy River: The McGregor Saga	Rob McGregor	65 episodes
1997	The Devil Game	Michael	Television film
1997	Halifax f.p.	Daniel & Richard Viney	Episode: "Déjà Vu"
2011	Mildred Pierce	Monty Beragon	5 episodes
2012	Jack Irish: Bad Debts	Jack Irish	Television film
2012	Jack Irish: Black Tide	Jack Irish	Television film
2014	Sean Saves the World	Liam Stone	Episode: "The Dark Sean Rises"
2014	Jack Irish: Dead Point	Jack Irish	Television film
2015	Neighbours 30th: The Stars Reunite	Himself	Documentary
2015	Between a Frock and a Hard Place	Himself	Documentary
2016–2021	Jack Irish	Jack Irish	16 episodes
2016	The Wizards of Aus	Morgan Wright	Episode: "Honk"
2017	When We Rise	Cleve Jones	8 episodes
2018	The Innocents	Halvorson	8 episodes
2019	A Christmas Carol	Ebenezer Scrooge	3 episodes
2021	Advancing Australia	Himself (host)	Documentary series
2021	Mare of Easttown	Richard Ryan	6 episodes
2022	A Spy Among Friends	Kim Philby	6 episodes
2023	The Clearing	Bryce Latham	8 episodes

=== Theatre ===
Year	Title	Role	Company
1980	Sinbad	Chorus Member	Gsoda Junior Players
1981	Aladdin	Chorus Member	Gsoda Junior Players
1982	Hans Christian Andersen	Professor Pfeiffer	Gsoda Junior Players
1983	The Wizard of Oz	The Tin Man	Gsoda Junior Players
1984	Queen of Hearts	The Racing Demon Snap	Gsoda Junior Players
2023	And Thus Began the Tale	Himself	Gsoda Junior Players

=== Music videos ===
Year	Title	Role	Artist
2002	"Across the Night"	Man	Silverchair
2021	"Follow Me Around"	The Man	Radiohead

== Discography ==
- Broken Bones (2014)
- The Nomad (2018)

== Awards and nominations ==
On 18 September 2011, Pearce won the Primetime Emmy Award for Outstanding Supporting Actor in a Miniseries or Movie for his work in Todd Haynes' limited series Mildred Pierce as Monty Beragon. Pearce received a Golden Globe Award nomination for his performance. Pearce has been nominated for three Screen Actors Guild Awards winning for Outstanding Cast in a Motion Picture along with the cast of The King's Speech (2010). Pearce was nominated with the cast of L.A. Confidential (1997) and Mildred Pierce (2011).

== See also ==
- List of Academy Award winners and nominees from Australia
- List of actors with Academy Award nominations
- List of Australian film actors
