= Behind the News =

Australian TV series

- Also known as: BTN
- Genre: Children's; education; current affairs
- Presented by: Amelia Moseley (2018–present); Nathan Bazley (2007–2017); Sarah Larsen; Tash Thiele (2010-2015); Jack Evans (2016—present); Nat Kelly ( 2019-present); Wren Gillett (2024-present); Cale Matthews(2019-present); Michelle Wakim (2022—Present)
- Country of origin: Australia
- Original language: English
- No. of seasons: 50

Production
- Executive producer: Robert Clark (c. 2005–2014)
- Production locations: Adelaide, South Australia
- Running time: 26 minutes

Original release
- Network: ABC TV (1968–2014); ABC Me (2014–2024); ABC Entertains (Classroom, 2024–present); ABC Family (Newsbreak, 2024–present)
- Release: 5 June 1968 – 1969
- Release: 1969 – 9 December 2003
- Release: 15 February 2005 – present

Behind the News (more commonly known as BTN) is an Australian children's news program televised by the ABC (Australian Broadcasting Corporation). Described as an 'educational news program aimed at 10–13 year old kids', BTN is commonly used by schools in Australia as an education tool to help children catch up with current affairs and issues.

BTN currently has three shows. Classroom is the flagship weekly show that investigates various news topics for 10–13 year olds. Newsbreak is a daily news show to help Australians kids stay informed on current affairs within 5 minutes. High is exclusive to digital platforms and goes more in-depth into topics that are more appropriate for high school students.

== History ==
On 5 June 1968, Behind the News aired its first episode. Originally known as Current Affairs, the name was changed to its current name within a year. The discovery of the first episode happened during the 45th anniversary (at the time, the show claimed to have started in 1969).

The ABC chose to axe Behind the News at the end of 2003 in an argument with the Australian Government over funding, but it returned to air in 2005. While BTN was the first and original program of this nature, a similar program on Network Ten, ttn (The Total News), debuted 2003, the year BTN ceased transmission. The Total News was axed at the end of 2008.

In 2008 Behind the News was added to the ABC's new streaming service, ABC iview which was the same year that iview launched.

In June 2014, BTN celebrated its 45th anniversary and produced a short spliced clip of several decades' worth of presenters and theme songs. On 21 July 2014, BTN moved to digital channel ABC3 as part of the ABC's educational programming move.

On 2 May 2016, BTN relaunched with new graphics and a new look, also switching from using greenscreen to using the same set used on ABC3 News. The new graphics and look were teased on 1 May 2016 with the launch of BTN Newsbreak, a rebrand of ABC3 News.

According to the last episode of BTN Newsbreak for 2021, it was announced that the show would have a new look which was launched the next year.

In 2022, BTN officially announced BTN High, a version of BTN for highschool students, with the first episodes airing in January 2023.

== Presenters and reporters ==
Behind the News is presented by Amelia Moseley. BTN is produced by Sarah Larsen.

The current reporting team at Behind the News includes: Jack Evans, Matthew Holbrook, Leela Varghese, Nathaniel Kelly, Cale Matthews, Charlotte Batty, Natasha Thiele, Amal Wehbe, Alexander Aarao-Ward, Michelle Wakim, Joseph Baronio, Olivia Mason, Nicholas Maher, Ella Germein, Josh Langman, Justina Ward, Lyeba Khan, Thomas Midena, Wren Gillett, Kushi Venkatesh, Saskia Mortarotti, Tatenda Chibika, Genevieve Blandin de Chalain, Aiden McNamara and Sharne Wakefield.

Former reporters include Ruby Cornish, Carl Smith, Erin Scott, Ben Nielsen, Evelyn Manfield, Martin Dougan and Emma Davis.

== See also ==
- List of Australian television series
- List of longest-running Australian television series
