= Love to Share =

- Genre: cooking show
- Presented by: Aaron Harvie
- Country of origin: Australia
- Original language: English
- No. of seasons: 2

Production
- Running time: 60 minutes

Original release
- Network: Network Ten
- Release: 15 September 2012 – 2013

Love to Share is an Australian Saturday cooking series which aired Network Ten from Saturday 15 September 2012 at 4pm.

The show is based around people, including chefs, and celebrity guests, sharing their recipes with others. The show also has a website collection of recipes that users can share and read recipes.

Episode	Guests	Recipes
S01E01		
S01E02	Chris Badenoch, Tiffany Hall	Cured Duck, Raspberry Fluff Slice
