= Advancing Australia =

Australian television series

- Genre: Factual
- Written by: Andrew Anastasios; Ben Gartland
- Directed by: Ben Gartland
- Presented by: Guy Pearce
- Country of origin: Australia
- Original language: English
- No. of series: 1
- No. of episodes: 12

Production
- Executive producer: Catherine Gunn
- Producers: Catherine Gun; Ben Gartland; Matt Pearson
- Cinematography: Eric Maddison
- Camera setup: Multi-camera
- Running time: 22–25 minutes
- Production company: Bengar Films

Original release
- Network: Network Ten
- Release: 27 March 2021 – present

Advancing Australia is an Australian documentary television series that premiered on 27 March 2021 on Network Ten and is hosted by actor Guy Pearce. In each episode, the show focuses on an Australian national issue and how innovators have tried to use their skills to solve the issue, create change and a better place.

The series was sponsored by AGL.

== Episodes ==
No. overall	No. in season	Title	Original release date	AUS viewers
1	1	"Sea of Plastic"	27 March 2021	N/A
Guy Pearce meets three Aussie innovators who are taking on the issue of plastic pollutants being dumped into the oceans. Surfer Pete Ceglinski from Seabin, marine biologist Nicole Nash from The Last Straw and faux fur designer Danielle Pelly from Ena Pelly, each share how they’re making an impact on the issue.
2	2	"Eat the Planet"	3 April 2021	N/A
Guy Pearce meets three Aussie innovators feeding the planet by fighting food waste. Food rescuer Katie Barfield of Yume Food, restaurant shell waste warrior Simon Branigan of Shuck Don't Chuck and Queensland banana farmer Krista Watkins of Natural Evolution each share how they're making an impact on the issue.
3	3	"Disability"	17 April 2021 (Note: This episode was originally scheduled to air on 10 April 2021 but was postponed due to Network 10's coverage of the Death of Prince Philip, Duke of Edinburgh. This delay bumped all the following episodes by one night from their originally intended airdate.)	N/A
Guy Pearce meets three tech-savvy Aussies are making the world a better place for millions of Australians living with disabilities through ingenious inventions designed to help out their mates.
4	4	TBA	24 April 2021	N/A
5	5	TBA	1 May 2021	N/A
6	6	TBA	8 May 2021	N/A
7	7	TBA	15 May 2021	N/A
8	8	TBA	22 May 2021	N/A
9	9	TBA	29 May 2021	N/A
10	10	TBA	5 June 2021	N/A
11	11	TBA	12 June 2021	N/A
12	12	TBA	19 June 2021	N/A
