= Healthy Homes TV =

- Also known as: Healthy Homes Australia
- Genre: lifestyle
- Presented by: Walt Collins; Dani Wales
- Country of origin: Australia
- Original language: English
- No. of seasons: 8

Production
- Executive producer: Walt collins
- Production location: Australia
- Camera setup: fx7
- Running time: 30 minutes

Original release
- Network: Network Ten
- Release: 24 January 2015 – present

Healthy Homes Australia is an Australian lifestyle television series aired for its debut on Network Ten on 24 January 2015 every Saturday for 13 episodes. In 2019 season 8 will broadcast. It is presented by Walt Collins and Dani Wales. The series is based around home, garden, building and construction and enjoys solid ratings. The program airs on Saturday afternoons at 2 p.m. and is repeated on Sunday for an encore broadcast.
