= Let's Do Coffee =

Australian television series

Let's Do Coffee is an Australian lifestyle series which began in 2015 on Network Ten. The series celebrates the culture of coffee and features coffee growers, roasters, connoisseurs celebrity drinkers and segments on cafe food and cooking. The series is hosted by Toni Pearen and features presenters Julia Achilleos, Dan Levitus, Jason Roberts, Rowie Dillon, Virginia Lette, Nicolette Minster and Jackie M. It is created and produced by The Full Box. The series is repeated on One.
