= Good Chef Bad Chef =

- Genre: Cooking Show
- Presented by: Joanna McMillan (2024–); Tim Bone (2024–); Jacqueline Alwill (2024–); Mike Reid (2024–); Adrian Richardson (2011–2023); Preeya Alexander (2022–2023); Gary Mehigan (2006–2007); Janella Purcell (2006–2007; 2011–2012); Zoe Bingley-Pullin (2013–2017); Rosie Mansfield (2018–2021); Preeya Alexander (2022–2023)
- Country of origin: Australia
- Original language: English
- No. of seasons: 16
- No. of episodes: 900

Production
- Executive producers: Harry Hart; Leigh Redlich
- Running time: 30 minutes
- Production company: H Squared TV

Original release
- Network: Seven Network
- Release: 2006 – 2007
- Network: Network Ten
- Release: 3 January 2011 – present

Good Chef Bad Chef is an Australian television cooking show. The "Good Chef" presents health conscious recipes, while the "Bad Chef" presents indulgent recipes. The show's presenters are Joanna McMillan, Tim Bone, Jacqueline Alwill and Mike Reid.

Good Chef Bad Chef was originally hosted by Gary Mehigan and Janella Purcell on the Seven Network from 2006 to 2007. A second season featuring both hosts screened in 2010.

The series was picked up by Network Ten in 2011 with Adrian Richardson presenting the indulgent recipes between 2011 and 2023. The nutritionist co-hosts who presented the healthy recipes were Janella Purcell from 2011 until 2012, Zoe Bingley-Pullin from 2013 to 2017 and Rosie Mansfield from 2018 to 2021. Dr Preeya Alexander co-hosted the show alongside Richardson in 2022.

The show was relaunched in 2024 with four new co-hosts appearing in different combinations. Dietician Dr Joanna McMillan and nutritionist Jacqueline Alwill present health conscious recipes, while chefs Mike Reid and Tim Bone present the indulgent recipes.

== See also ==
- List of Australian television series
- List of cooking shows
