= Taboo (Australian TV series) =

- Genre: Documentary; Comedy
- Based on: Taboo (Belgium TV series) by Philippe Geubels
- Presented by: Harley Breen
- Country of origin: Australia
- Original language: English
- No. of seasons: 1
- No. of episodes: 4

Production
- Camera setup: Multi-camera
- Production company: Lune Media

Original release
- Network: Network Ten
- Release: 21 August 2018 – 3 July 2019

Taboo is an Australian comedy factual television series which premiered on Network 10 on 30 January 2018. The program is hosted by comedian Harley Breen, who tackles sensitive subjects and concludes with a comedy routine. The host spends time with people who are disabled, terminally ill, victims of racism and those living with mental illness, turning their misfortunate, unique situations into a comedy routine experience which he performs before them and a crowd of family, friends and the public.

Taboo is produced by Lune Media and is based on a Belgian format. The pilot episode screened on 21 August 2018 and a season with three further episodes premiered on Thursday, 13 June 2019.

== Episodes and ratings ==
No.	Title	Air date	Timeslot	Overnight ratings		Consolidated ratings		Total viewers	Ref(s)
No.	Title	Air date	Timeslot	Viewers	Rank	Viewers	Rank	Total viewers	Ref(s)
1	"Terminal Illness"	June 13, 2019	Thursday 8:45 pm	309,000	19	68,000	16	376,000	
2	"Extreme Bigotry & Racism"	June 20, 2019	Thursday 8:40 pm	330,000	20	45,000	19	375,000	
3	"Mental Health"	June 27, 2019	Thursday 8:40 pm	326,000	18	—N/a	—N/a	326,000	
4	"Physical Disability"	August 21, 2018; July 3, 2019	Thursday 8:40 pm	280,000	21	—N/a	—N/a	280,000	
