= Ttn =

ttn
- ttn logo
- Also known as: the total news
- Genre: Children's television
- Presented by: Amelia Charlton; Scott Beveridge; Emily Barker; Aimee McKay
- Country of origin: Australia
- Original language: English
- No. of seasons: 5

Production
- Production locations: Brisbane, Queensland
- Running time: 30 minutes

Original release
- Network: Network Ten
- Release: 3 February 2004 – 4 December 2008

Related
- Behind the News

ttn (the total news) was a 30 minute weekly Australian news program aimed at school-aged (9- to 14-year-old) children produced and broadcast by Network Ten from 2004 to 2008. It presented current issues and events in a way that could be understood and further explored by its intended viewers.

ttn premiered on 3 February 2004. It was created in the wake of an outcry against the cancellation of Behind the News, a long running ABC TV program similar in objective to ttn that was axed for a time due to budget cuts. ttn itself was axed in December 2008 after five years on air following budgetary constraints.

ttn aired every Tuesday each week during the school year. Episodes were supplemented by features and activities printed weekly in News Limited newspapers.

== See also ==
- List of Australian television series
