= My Market Kitchen =

- Genre: Cooking
- Presented by: Laura Sharrad
- Country of origin: Australia
- Original language: English
- No. of seasons: 9
- No. of episodes: 500+

Production
- Running time: 30 minutes (including commercials)
- Production company: Creative Media Productions

Original release
- Network: Network 10
- Release: 22 August 2016 – present

My Market Kitchen is an Australian cooking television series which debuted on Network 10 on 22 August 2016, currently hosted by Laura Sharrad. It was previously hosted by Emma Dean and Lynton Tapp from 2016 to 2018, then Elena Duggan and Khanh Ong for the 2019 series, Ben O'Donoghue for the 2020 series, Matt Sinclair (2021) and Mike Reid (2021-2022).

== Presenters ==
Presenters	Tenure
Emma Dean	2016–18
Lynton Tapp	2016–18
Elena Duggan	2019
Khanh Ong	2019
Ben O'Donoghue	2020
Matt Sinclair	2021
Mike Reid	2021-22
Laura Sharrad	2021–present

== See also ==
- List of Australian television series
- List of cooking shows
