= Ben's Menu =

- Genre: Cooking
- Presented by: Ben Milbourne
- Country of origin: Australia
- Original language: English
- No. of seasons: 3
- No. of episodes: 270

Production
- Running time: 22 minutes (w/o commercials)

Original release
- Network: Network Ten
- Release: 8 September 2014 – 2017

Ben's Menu is an Australian television cooking series which airs on Network Ten. It started on 8 September 2014.

Presented by Ben Milbourne from the fourth season of MasterChef Australia, the show sometimes features a guest, cooking and discussing food recipes. It is filmed at Ben's farmhouse in northwest Tasmania.

== See also ==
- List of Australian television series
- List of cooking shows
