= Greg Malouf =

Michelin Star Australian chef and author (1960–2024)

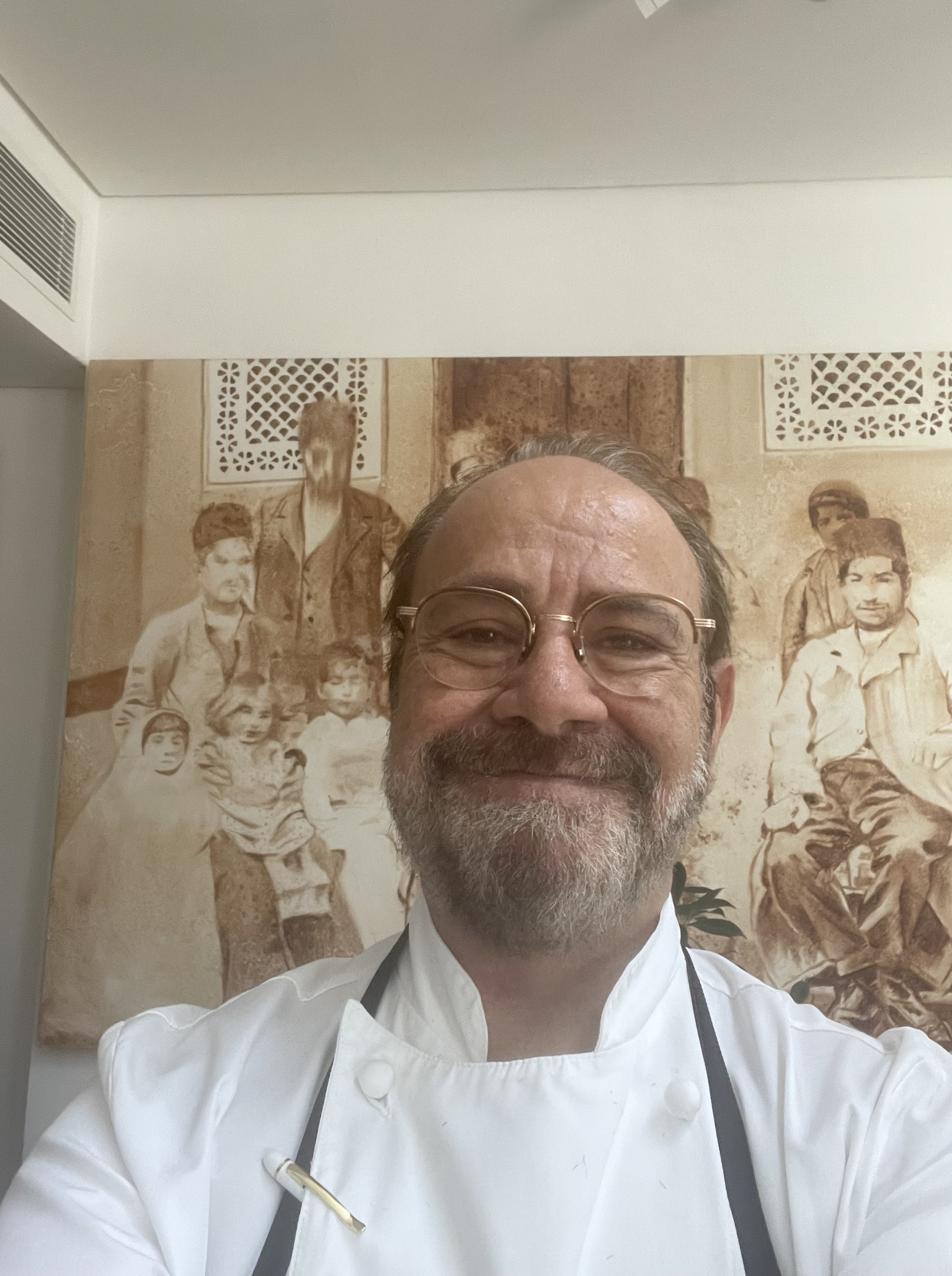
- Born: 1960; Melbourne, Victoria, Australia
- Died: September 2024 (aged 64)
- Education: William Angliss Institute of TAFE
- Culinary career
- Cooking style: Modern Middle Eastern
- Rating
- Michelin stars (2011)
- Previous restaurant
- Petersham Nurseries Cafe
- Awards
- James Beard Foundation Award 2019; Two Chefs Hats AGFG Awards
- Website: https://www.gregmalouf.com.au/

Greg Malouf (1959 – September 2024) was an Australian chef of Lebanese descent, author, and culinary consultant. He was known as a pioneer of modern Middle Eastern cuisine in Australia and for the influence that his work has had on Middle Eastern cuisine at large.

Malouf won the James Beard Foundation Award for his book Suqar in 2019. He was also awarded two hats at the chef's hat awards by the Age Food Guide. Petersham Nurseries Café in Richmond, London acquired a Michelin star while under his leadership.

Malouf lived in Dubai, United Arab Emirates where he consulted with restaurants globally and owned a spice range called "Malouf's Mezza". He was considered to be one of the foremost authorities on Middle Eastern cuisine and had a significant impact on the way people think about and approach this cuisine.

== Early life ==
Greg Malouf was born in Melbourne to Lebanese parents. He developed an interest in cooking and cuisine at a young age, to the disapproval of his parents. At age 18, he left home, leaving a message for his parents stating that he wanted to be a chef. After several nights sleeping in his personal car, he scrounged up a day job cutting metal balustrades and an evening job as a kitchen hand at a Mexican restaurant in Sydney. Then came a formal apprenticeship with Dennis Hagger back in Melbourne, which was followed by several years spent abroad.

== Career ==
Malouf commenced his training as an apprentice cook at William Angliss Institute in 1979 where he worked at Watsons, Mietta's, and Two Faces restaurants. He spent some time in Europe from 1981 to 1983 working in various restaurants across the continent. From 1985 until 1988, he resided in Hong Kong and worked as a cook at Restaurant 97 in Lan Kwai Fong, which later changed its name to Post 97. In 1991 he moved back to Melbourne where he was appointed head chef at O'Connell's Restaurant in South Melbourne, His reputation for contemporary Middle Eastern food got cemented there and under his leadership the restaurant wins numerous awards. It is the first Middle Eastern restaurant to be awarded a ‘hat’ in The Age Good Food Guide.

In 1999, he published Saha: a Chef’s Journey through Lebanon and Syria with his then wife Lucy Malouf, the foreword to which would later be written by Anthony Bourdain.

In 2001, Malouf took the helm at MoMo restaurant where his contemporary approach to Middle Eastern cuisine was met with critical acclaim. During his tenure there, the restaurant successfully earned a one-hat status in the Age Good Food Guide. In 2009 MoMo was awarded two hats (out of three) in The Age Good Food Guide. In 2010 MoMo was awarded two hats in The Age Good Food Guide for the second consecutive year.

In 2012 Malouf was invited to head up the Petersham Nurseries Café in Richmond, South London. Under his leadership the restaurant earned a Michelin Star. He left the restaurant soon afterwards for Dubai, where he worked at many restaurants, including Clé and Zahira.

In 2019, Suqar Desserts and Sweets From The Modern Middle East won the James Beard Award for Baking and Desserts.

Malouf stated his desire to leave behind hectic restaurant schedules and focus on his work as a culinary consultant.

== Illness and death ==
Malouf suffered from heart problems from an early age. In 1981, he had a triple bypass surgery at age 21 in Paris. He had his first heart transplant in 1989, and a second transplant in the early 2000s after his body rejected the donor heart.

Malouf died in September 2024, at the age of 65.

== Books ==
- Malouf, Greg; Malouf, Lucy (1999). Arabesque. ISBN 9781740667678.
- Malouf, Greg; Malouf, Lucy (1999). Saha: a chef's journey through Lebanon and Syria. Hardie Grant. ISBN 9781740667661.
  - Foreword By Anthony Bourdain
- Malouf, Greg; Malouf, Lucy (2001). Moorish: flavours from Mecca to Marrakech. Hardie Grant. ISBN 9781876719982.
- Malouf, Greg; Malouf, Lucy (2007). Turquoise: a chef's travels in Turkey. Hardie Grant. ISBN 9780811866033.
- Malouf, Greg; Malouf, Lucy (2010). Saraban: a chef's journey through Persia. Hardie Grant. ISBN 9781742705132.
- Malouf, Greg; Malouf, Lucy (2012). Malouf: New Middle Eastern Food. Hardie Grant. ISBN 9781742701455.
- Malouf, Greg; Malouf, Lucy (2014). New Feast: Modern Middle Eastern Vegetarian. Hardie Grant. ISBN 9781743795941.
- Malouf, Greg; Malouf, Lucy (2018). SUQAR: Desserts & Sweets from the Modern Middle East. Hardie Grant. ISBN 9781743794135.
  - Won the James Beard Foundation award in 2019

== Awards ==
Year	Name Of the award	Awarded By	Notes
1991	One Chef's Hat	The Age Good Food Guide Chef's Hat Awards	Greg Malouf won the award for O'Connells Restaurant, Melbourne while heading the kitchen.
2001	One Chef's Hat	The Age Good Food Guide Chef's Hat Awards	Greg Malouf won the award for MoMo Restaurant, Melbourne, while heading the kitchen.
2009	Two Chef's Hat	The Age Good Food Guide Chef's Hat Awards	Greg Malouf won the award for MoMo Restaurant, Melbourne, while heading the kitchen.
2010	Two Chef's Hat	The Age Good Food Guide Chef's Hat Awards	Greg Malouf won the award for MoMo Restaurant, Melbourne, while heading the kitchen.
2011	One Michelin Star	The Michelin Guide	Greg Malouf won the award for Petersham Nurseries Café, Richmond, South London while heading the kitchen.
2019	James Beard Award for Baking and Dessert	The James Beard foundation	Greg and Lucy Malouf shared the award for their book "Suqar Desserts and Sweets From The Modern Middle East".
