= Everyday Gourmet with Justine Schofield =

Australian television cooking show

- Genre: Cooking
- Written by: Harry Hart
- Directed by: Leigh Redlich
- Presented by: Justine Schofield
- Country of origin: Australia
- Original language: English
- No. of seasons: 16
- No. of episodes: 1,000+

Production
- Executive producers: Harry Hart; Leigh Redlich
- Running time: 30 minutes
- Production company: H Squared TV

Original release
- Network: Network Ten
- Release: 18 April 2011 – present

Everyday Gourmet with Justine Schofield is an Australian television cooking show, that is hosted by former MasterChef contestant Justine Schofield. It was first broadcast on Network Ten in 2011. The show is directed towards the home-cooked meals and features recipes ranging from simple to the more complex. It regularly features guests, including chefs, food specialists and other former Masterchef contestants. The series also screens on Lifestyle Food and SBS Food.

== Episodes ==
=== Series 1 (2011) ===
This is a list of episodes for Series 1 of Everyday Gourmet with Justine Schofield:

Episode #	Date Aired	Recipe
1	Mon, 18 Apr 2011	Moroccan Honey Lamb Ribs (Tom Niall, Butcher), Moroccan Raw Carrot Salad, Salted Caramel, Walnut & Chocolate Brownies
2	Tue, 19 Apr 2011	Beetroot & Walnut Mini Tart Tatins With Goat’s Cheese, Beetroot & Grilled Haloumi Salad with Eggplant Mash, Mexican Chicken & Bean Pizza (Lucy Kelly, WeightWatchers)
3	Wed, 20 Apr 2011	Roast Spiced Pork Belly with Apple Sauce (Lucas Parsons), Individual Summer Meringues With Summer Berries
4	Thu, 21 Apr 2011	Sourdough Leaven (Al Reid, Baker), Plain Sourdough Bread (Al Reid, Baker), Seeded sourdough bread (Al Reid, Baker), Fruit sourdough bread (Al Reid, Baker), Prawn Cocktail with Saffron Angel Hair Pasta and Citrus Mayonnaise (Adam Swanson, Chef)
5	Fri, 22 Apr 2011	Slow cooked Tomahawk, Pine Mushrooms, White Anchovy & Herb Butter (Scott Pickett, Chef), Speck, Porcini and Pine Nut Pasta
7	Tue, 26 Apr 2011	Creamy Chicken and Pumpkin Pasta (Lucy Kelly, WeightWatchers), Beef in Red Wine Pot Pie
8	Wed, 27 Apr 2011	Zucchini Salad with Pomegranate Dressing (Fiona Inglis), Carrot Falafels With Yogurt and Tahini Dipping Sauce (Fiona Inglis), Brioche Eggy Bread with Honeyed Banana and Blueberries, Stir Fried Greens
9	Thu, 28 Apr 2011	Fresh Pappardelle Tossed in Olive Oil, Rocket & Fresh Walnuts (Adam Swanson, Chef), Olive Oil, Orange, Garlic & Pumpkin Puree, Duck Breast with Sauce Aigre Douce and Warm Haricot Bean Salad
10	Fri, 29 Apr 2011	Lasagna with Fresh Salmon and Mascarpone (Dominique Rizzo, Chef), Warm German Sausage and Potato Salad
11	Mon, 16 May 2011	Roast Pork Scotch Fillet with Caramelised Onions (with Tom Niall, Butcher), Tuna Puttanesca, Macaroni Cheese, Crepes with Caramel Apples
12	Tue, 17 May 2011	Hotcakes with Blueberries & Ricotta (Lucy Kelly, WeightWatchers), Hummus with Tuna and Sumac, Soy Chilli Sauce, Mushroom Persillade Vol au Vents with Shredded Confit of Duck, Super Fruity Muesli
13	Wed, 18 May 2011	Chicken & Pancetta Roulade with Madeira Sauce (Lucas Parsons), Omelette with Chunky Tuna, Chives and Corn, Warm Haricot Bean Salad
14	Thu, 19 May 2011	Braised Carrots with Cream, Roast Purple Carrot Salad (Sam Herde, Green Grocer), Honey Soy Drumettes, Veal Ragout with Strozzapreti Pasta (Adam Swanson, Chef),
15	Fri, 20 May 2011	Salmon Curado with Chilli and Star Anise (Miguel Maestre, Chef), Churros with Chocolate Sauce (Miguel Maestre, Chef)
16	Mon, 23 May 2011	Goat Ragu with Pappardelle & Ricotta (Tom Niall), Bruschetta with Tuna Slices, Pesto and Walnuts, Homemade Raspberry Yoghurt on Pikelets, Rum and Raisin Ice Cream
17	Tue, 24 May 2011	Simple Sweet & Sour Chicken (Lucy Kelly, WeightWatchers), Steamed Sweet Corn Custards with Crab and Coriander Salsa, Soy and Ginger Tuna Savoury Pancakes, Homemade Baked Beans with Eggs and Chorizo
18	Wed, 25 May 2011	Finger Lime Tart with Coconut Cream (Skye Craig), Chicken Finger Sandwiches, Baked Field Mushrooms with Tuna and Goats Cheese, Caffeine Amigo Cashew Cream (Skye Craig)
19	Thu, 26 May 2011	Veal Meatballs with Large Rigatoni (Adam Swanson, Chef), Earl Grey Tea Cake with Bergamot Icing (Kath Clarke, Pastry Chef), Stir-fried Greens
20	Fri, 27 May 2011	Salt Bush Lamb Loin, Roasted Onion and Cavalo Nero (Jacques Reymond, Chef), Vanilla and Honey Pannacotta with Coffee Caramel Sauce, Mascarpone and Lemon Stuffing for Roast Chicken
21	Mon, 30 May 2011	Crumbed Duck Sausage (Tom Niall, Butcher), Whole Roast Duck with Apples and Cider
22	Tue, 31 May 2011	Sourdough Leaven (Alan Reid, Baker), Wholewheat Sourdough Bread (Alan Reid, Baker), Baked Potato with Tuna and Cheddar, Roast Chicken & Avocado Salad with a Coriander & Ginger Dressing, Veal Stroganoff (Lucy Kelly, WeightWatchers),
23	Wed, 1 Jun 2011	Beef Ribs Braised in Soy and Wheat Beer (Chris Badenoch), Caramelised Pineapple, Chilli Honeycomb and Coconut Sorbet (Chris Badenoch),
24	Thu, 2 Jun 2011	Bianco Marinara with Fennel Linguine (Adam Swanson, Chef), Chicken BLT, Poached Pears in Red Wine Served with Mascarpone
25	Fri, 3 Jun 2011	Chicken Shank, Eggplant and Fig Tagine (Shane Delia, Chef), Nut Pesto, Turkish Delight filled Doughnuts (Shane Delia, Chef)
26	Mon, 6 Jun 2011	Tuna Croquettes with Wasabi Mayonnaise, Chilli Beef Brisket (Tom Niall), Super Fruity Muesli, Honey Soy Drumettes
27	Tue, 7 Jun 2011	Onion Tart, Omelette with Chunky Tuna, Chives and Corn, Pannacotta with Poached Cherries (Lucy Kelly, WeightWatchers)
28	Wed, 8 Jun 2011	Thai Green Curry (Marion Grasby), Bruschetta with Tuna Slices, Pesto and Walnuts, Thai Fried Rice with Prawns (Marion Grasby), Rum and Raisin Ice Cream
29	Thu, 9 Jun 2011	Risoni Funghi (Adam Swanson, Chef), Chilli Con Carne with Skirt Steak, Soy and Ginger Tuna Savoury Pancakes
30	Fri, 10 Jun 2011	Baby Snapper En Papillote, Shaved Fennel & Citrus Salad (Scott Pickett, Chef), Potato Gratin, Lemon, Tuna and Smoked Paprika Spread
31	Mon, 13 Jun 2011	George’s Olive Oil Chocolate Mousse with Fresh Berries (Pablo Canamasas), Smokey Bacon and Duck Egg Sandwich, Chilli Chicken, Asian Marinated Steak with Bok Choy and Noodles
32	Tue, 14 Jun 2011	Baked Vegetarian Spring Rolls (Lucy Kelly, WeightWatchers), Wasabi Beer Battered Fish, Potato Wedges and Tartare Sauce, Seared Tuna with Soy and Cream Sauce
33	Wed, 15 Jun 2011	Lamb Rogan Josh & Raita (Lucas Parsons), Tuna Puttanesca, Macaroni Cheese, Braised Witlof Wrapped in Ham Gratin
34	Thu, 16 Jun 2011	Eggplant, Chicken & Gorgonzola Orrechiette (Adam Swanson, Chef), Plum and Hazelnut Upside Down Cake (Kath Clarke, Pastry Chef), Baked Field Mushrooms with Tuna and Goats Cheese
35	Fri, 17 Jun 2011	New Zealand king salmon with ponzu dressing, cucumber and nashi pear (Matt Moran, Chef), Lamb Shoulder with Beetroot and Feta (Matt Moran, Chef)
36	Mon, 20 Jun 2011	Lemon and Garlic Butterflied Chicken (Tom Niall), Easy Sticky Pork Fillet, Sticky and Spicy Pork Ribs
37	Tue, 21 Jun 2011	Pavlova with Fresh Summer Fruit (Lucy Kelly, WeightWatchers), Stuffed Tomatoes, Stuffed Tuna Ratatouille Capsicums
38	Wed, 22 Jun 2011	Quesadilla with avocado salsa (Fiona Inglis), Osso Bucco Lasagne
39	Thu, 23 Jun 2011	Algerian Lamb Shanks, Grilled Crispy Salmon with Rocket & Almond Pesto Tagliatelle (Adam Swanson, Chef), Soy Poached Chicken, Bruschetta with Tuna Slices, Pesto and Walnuts
40	Fri, 24 Jun 2011	Ricotta, Mascarpone and Blood Orange Jelly Tart (Dominique Rizzo, Chef), Rum and Raisin Ice Cream, Eye Fillet with Béarnaise Sauce, Lettuce Cups with Chilli Tuna (Chilli Tuna San Choi Bao)
41	Mon, 27 Jun 2011	Fettuccine Carbonara (Natalie Von Bertouch), Rib of Beef with an Easy Sauce Marchand, Celeriac Remoulade
42	Tue, 28 Jun 2011	Chicken & Lychee Thai Curry (Lucy Kelly, WeightWatchers), Chai Tea and Honey Cake (Kath Clarke), Gourmet Beef Burger
43	Wed, 29 Jun 2011	Lemon Myrtle and Raspberry Semifreddo (Skye Craig), Bitter Chocolate and Pomegranate Tarts (Skye Craig), Mini Fillet Mignon Wrapped in Bacon with Horseradish Crème
44	Thu, 30 Jun 2011	Amatriciana Sugo with Bucatini Pasta (Adam Swanson, Chef), Blanquette of Veal, Confit of Duck Salad, Soy Chilli Sauce, Baked Potato with Tuna and Cheddar
45	Fri, 1 Jul 2011	Eggs a la Flamenca (Miguel Maestre, Chef), Calasparra Rice-Crusted Sardines with Green Beans and Chorizo (Miguel Maestre, Chef), Chilli Chicken, Cinnamon Maple Macadamias
46	Mon, 4 Jul 2011	Jerusalem Artichoke and Chicken Pie (with Sam Herde), Rhubarb and Sour Cream Muffins, Stuffed Tuna Ratatouille Capsicums
47	Tue, 5 Jul 2011	Salmon and Scallops Terrine with Gremolata, Chicken Finger Sandwiches, Triple Chocolate Cheesecake (Lucy Kelly, WeightWatchers)
48	Wed, 6 Jul 2011	Sage Roasted Chicken with Crispy Baked Potatoes (Julie Goodwin), Pecan and White Chocolate Chip Cookies (Julie Goodwin), Cassata Nuda (Sabino Matera)
49	Thu, 7 Jul 2011	Chicken & White Bean Broth with Wholemeal Elbows Pasta (Adam Swanson), Sausage Rolls, Cauliflower Soup with Pancetta and Parmesan Croutons
50	Fri, 8 Jul 2011	Black Mussels Scented with Coriander (Jacques Reymond), Baked Mushrooms (Jacques Reymond), Chocolate Fondant
51	Mon, 11 Jul 2011	Roast Porchetta (Tom Niall), Tomato Couscous Salad, Fish and Prawn Curry, Cinnamon Maple Macadamias
52	Tue, 12 Jul 2011	Vegetarian Nachos with Guacamole (Lucy Kelly, WeightWatchers), Tuna, Olive and Chorizo Pasties, Blueberry & Pear Slice
53	Wed, 13 Jul 2011	Miso Grilled Fish with Daikon and Cucumber Salad (Callum Hann), Cheesecake, Mousse, Ginger Crumbs and Passionfruit (Callum Hann), Skate with Burnt Butter Sauce
54	Thu, 14 Jul 2011	Spiced Veal Osso Bucco with Herbed Couscous (Adam Swanson, Chef), Calamari a la Americane/Slow Braised Calamari, Fillet Steak Sandwich
55	Fri, 15 Jul 2011	Malaysian Rojak (Allen Woo, Chef), Allen’s Laksa Lemak (Allen Woo, Chef), Sago Pudding in Coconut Milk (Allen Woo, Chef), Croque Monsier
56	Mon, 18 Jul 2011	Tuna Pasta (Natalie Von Bertouch), Lamb Souvlaki, Lemon Verbena Crème Brulee
57	Tue, 19 Jul 2011	Rabbit With Prunes, Steak & Mushroom Pies (Lucy Kelly, WeightWatchers)
58	Wed, 20 Jul 2011	Halva Balls (Lola Berry), Avocado and Pistachio Dip (Lola Berry), Baked Potato with Tuna and Cheddar, Pumpkin Soup with Tahini
59	Thu, 21 Jul 2011	Mushroom, Pea & Pancetta Linguine (Adam Swanson, Chef), Stir-fried Greens, Skirt Steak Rolly Polly, Floating Islands
60	Fri, 22 Jul 2011	Braised Brisket with Roast Bavette (Colin Fassnidge, Chef), Vanilla Rice Pudding (Colin Fassnidge, Chef), Eggplant Parmigiana with Manchego Cheese
61	Mon, 5 Aug 2011	Organic Banana Mini Muffins (Lola Berry), Confit of Salmon with Beetroot Purée (Pablo Canamasas), Daube of Beef
62	Wed, 10 Aug 2011	Flourless Orange and Poppy Seed Cakes with Cardamom Ice-cream (Callum Hann), Crispy Skin Salmon with Mint Salsa Verde, Curried Yoghurt Chicken with Turmeric Rice
63	Thu, 12 Aug 2011	Yemista (Stuffed Tomatoes) with Risoni (Adam Swanson), Salmon Tartare with Crushed Peas and Crab, Giant Meatballs Stuffed with Mozzarella Tuna Puttanesca, Macaroni Cheese
64	Wed, 17 Aug 2011	Wild Mushroom Risotto (Sam Herde), Raspberry & Macadamia Galette (Lucy Kelly, WeightWatchers), Crispy Prawn Cigars with Coconut Dipping Sauce
65	Wed, 24 Aug 2011	Haloumi, Chorizo & Broccolini Salad, Smooth Banana & Pineapple Frappe, Cinnamon Maple Macadamias

=== Series 1 Tropical Gourmet New Caledonia (2016) ===
Tropical Gourmet: New Caledonia is a 2016 Australian culinary television series hosted by chef Justine Schofield, spun off from her long‑running cooking program Everyday Gourmet with Justine Schofield. The series follows Schofield as she travels through New Caledonia, exploring local ingredients, traditional cooking methods, and the region’s tropical landscapes while preparing a variety of dishes inspired by indigenous and French‑Pacific cuisine. It consists of one season with eight episodes, all shot on location in New Caledonia and first broadcast in 2016.

=== Series 1 Tropical Gourmet Queensland (2018) ===
Tropical Gourmet: Queensland is a 2018 Australian culinary television series hosted by Justine Schofield. Spun off from the original show, it follows Schofield's adventure in tropical Queensland as she documents recipes and culinary practices.

== Guest Chefs ==
Guest chefs on the show include:

- Adam Swanson, Chef, Zucca, Adelaide
- Callum Hann, MasterChef Series 2 Top 24 Callum's Kitchen
- Colin Fassnidge, Chef, Four In Hand, Sydney
- Dominique Rizzo, Chef www.dominiquerizzo.com
- Lola Berry, Nutritionist www.lolaberry.com
- Lucy Kelly, Senior Food Editor, Ask Lucy, Weight Watchers Australasia
- Pablo Canamasas, Oil Production Technical Manager, Boundary Bend Limited (Cobram Estate)
- Sam Herde, The Vegetable Connection
- Scott Pickett, Chef, The Point Albert Park, Melbourne
- Skye Craig, Dessert Maniac, Wild Sugar
- Tom Niall, Butcher, The Organic Meat Specialist, South Melbourne

== See also ==
- List of Australian television series
- List of cooking shows
