= Revival Foundation =

- Revival Foundation, Inc.
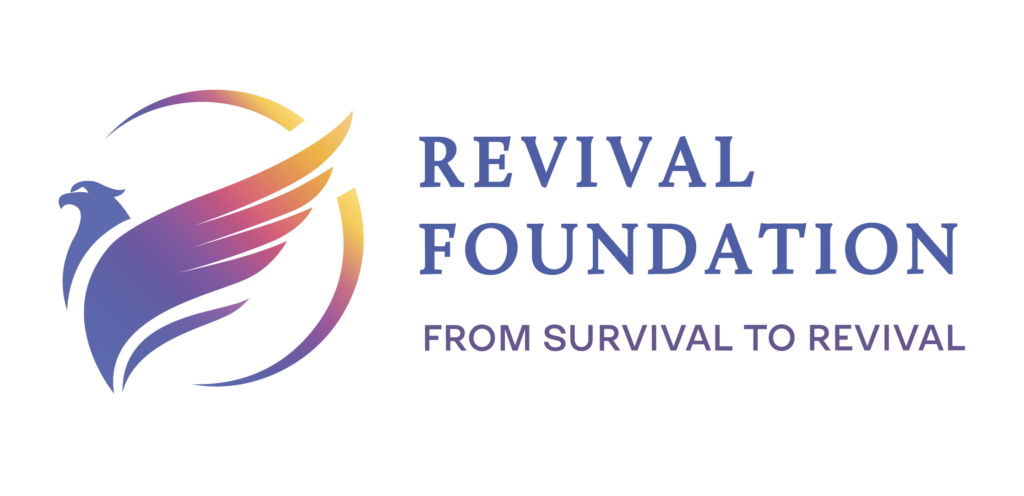
- Formation: April 12, 2022; 4 years ago
- Type: US 501(c)(3) organization; charitable organization
- Tax ID no.: 88-1794804
- Legal status: Nonprofit organization
- Purpose: Humanitarian, Philanthropy
- Headquarters: 2700 Woodley Road, NW, Suite 514, Washington, D.C. 20008
- Coordinates: 38.9251°N 77.0557°W
- Region served: United States, Ukraine
- Official language: English, Ukrainian
- President and CEO: Aksenia Krupenko
- Website: revivalfoundation.org

Revival Foundation, Inc. is US-based 501(c)(3) non-governmental non-for-profit organization dedicated to support Ukrainian people. Located in Washington, D.C. The Revival Foundation mission is to deliver effective and innovative solutions in critical times, to connect community of donors and community of people with needs by creating relevant infrastructure and logistics solutions in the most agile way: "From Revival to Survival". The foundation primarily focuses on providing urgent humanitarian and medical aid to Ukraine using a network of medical and pharmaceutical US companies and private donors through flexible logistics solutions.

== Project background ==
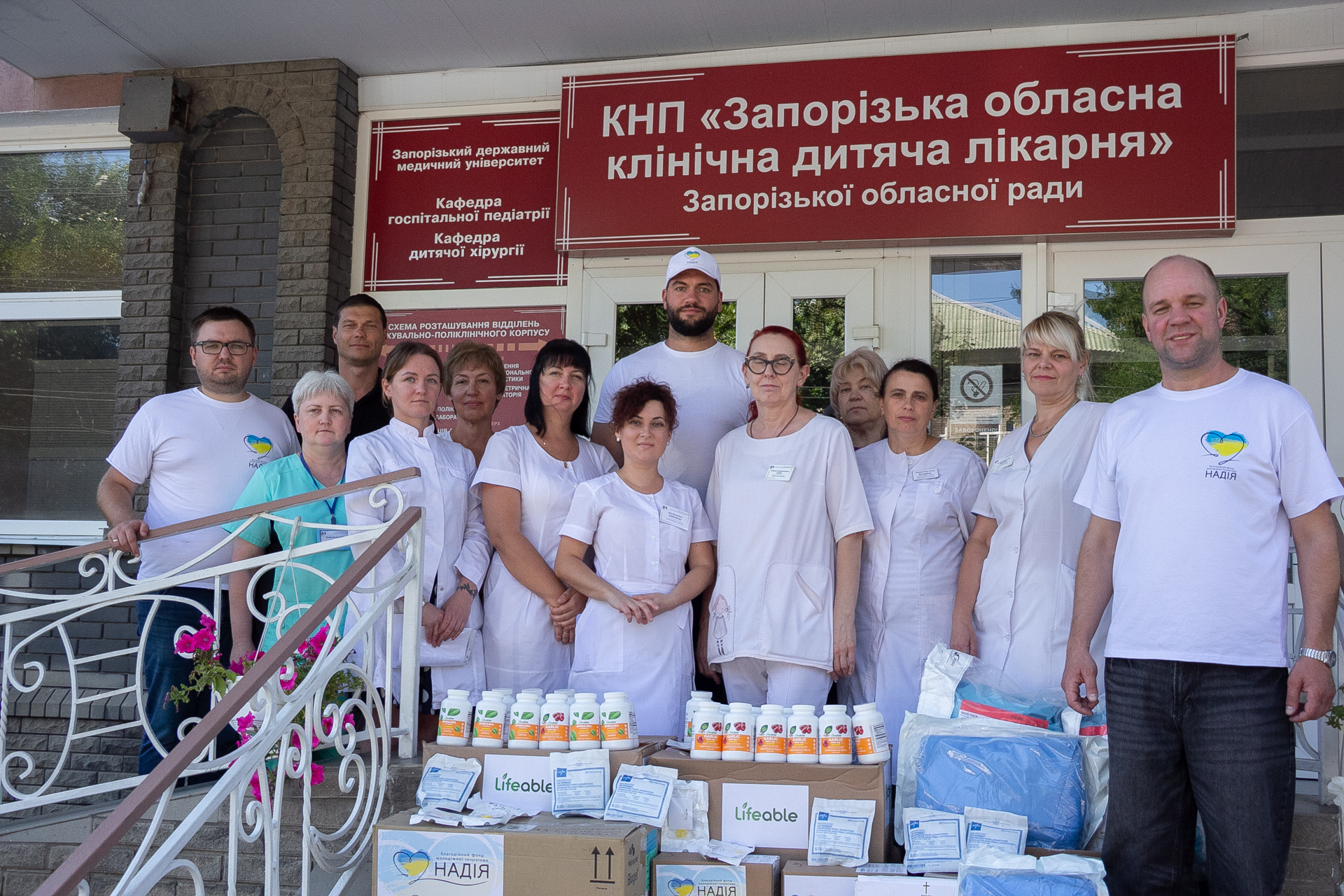
Humanitarian aid delivery to Ukraine by Revival Foundation in collaboration with Charity fund of Youth Initiative "Hope", vitamins by Lifeable, Zaporizhzhia Regional Clinical Children's Hospital, August 28, 2025.

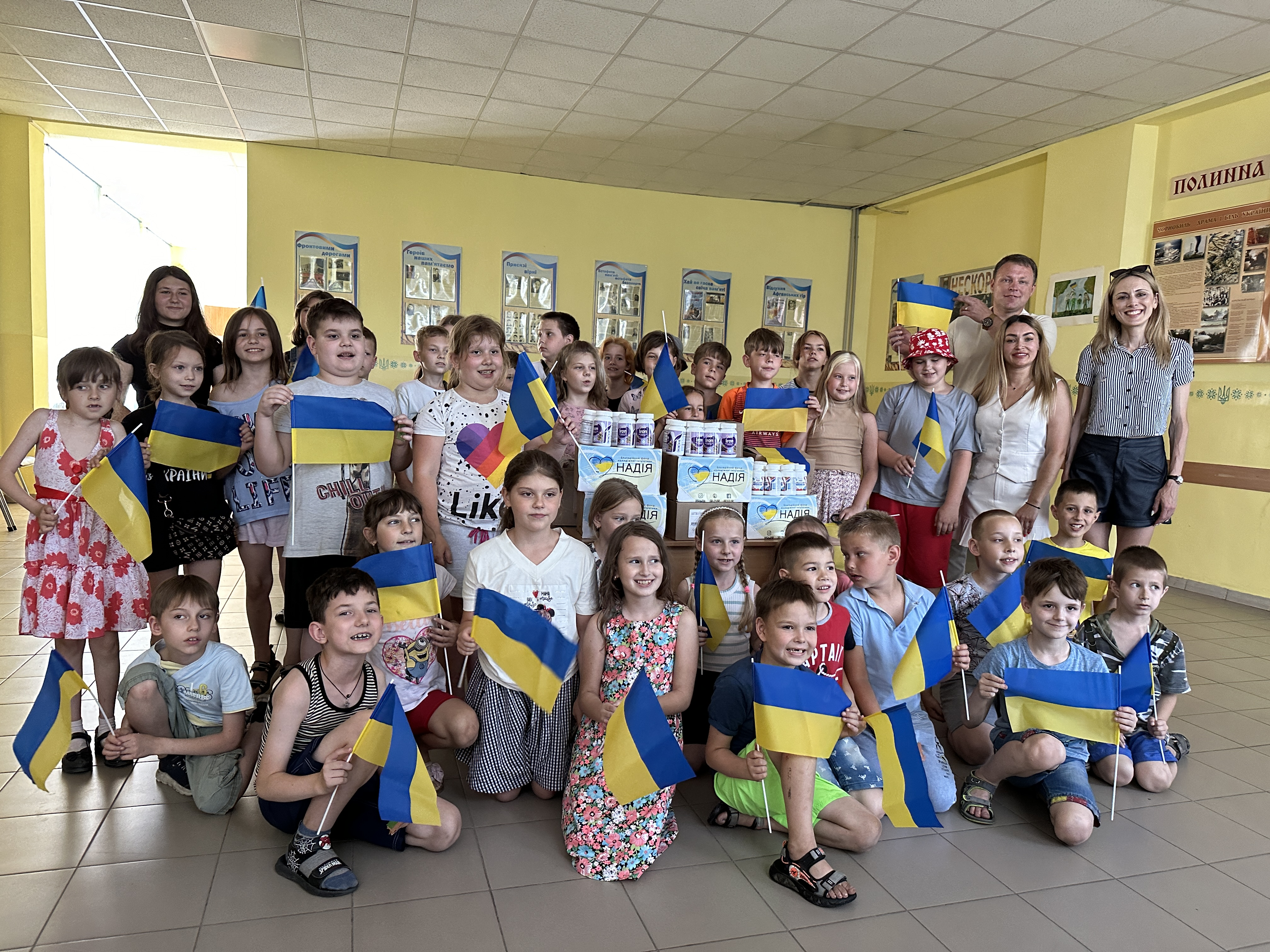
Educational institutions, centres for internally displaced persons, and children's art centres in the frontline city of Dnipro, received vitamin complexes from Revival Foundation and Geri Care Paratheatrical, June 20, 2024.

In the early weeks of the Russian invasion of Ukraine, the Revival Foundation Inc. was established to urgently coordinate aid efforts, reach out to both individual and corporate donors across the United States to mobilize immediate support. Revival Foundation was founded on April 12, 2022 by Aksenia Krupenko, Temuri Yakobashvili and Bohdana Urbanovych. The foundation rapidly evolved into a hub for collecting, organizing, and delivering humanitarian aid from the US to Ukraine.

Within days of the full-scale invasion, the Foundation created an efficient logistics chain for delivering humanitarian air cargo from Maryland to Warsaw and Lublin (Poland). The Foundation financed non-commercial charter flights operated by Ukrainian Windrose Airlines, transporting aid from John F. Kennedy International Airport (New York) to Lublin Airport and Warsaw Chopin Airport in Poland.

The Revival Foundation collaborated with Ukrposhta, the Ukrainian national postal service, which covered the cost of trucks transporting the humanitarian aid shipments from Lublin and Warsaw to a warehouse in Lviv, Ukraine, where part of the aid was distributed to local recipients. The remainder was transferred to freight cars at the Lviv railway station, with rolling stock provided free of charge by Ukrainian Railways. From Lviv, the aid was delivered to a distribution center in Kyiv and then transported by volunteer groups to destinations across the country. Supplies were directed to both civilian hospitals and military units on the front line.

According to state-owned enterprise Ukrposhta, the total value of humanitarian aid transported by air and truck between April and May 2022 amounted to approximately $50 million including urgent medical equipment and pharmaceutical supplies, urgent care supplies, food, clothes for children and adults. Beneficiaries included the Okhmatdyt National Specialized Children's Hospital in Kyiv and other healthcare facilities and churches in 15 regions of Ukraine including Chernihiv, Lviv, Odesa, and Kharkiv. Donations were made by individual donors and organizations from over 20 US states.

Between March 2022 and September 2024, the Foundation delivered 13 Airbus A330s cargo flights, 35 sea containers, and over 650 tons of humanitarian and medical supplies to Ukraine.

=== Food for Good ===
"Food for Good" initiative is a socioeconomic humanitarian program by Revival Foundation that supplied Ukrainian producers' food to numerous Ukrainian families in conflict zones. After spending two months in Ukraine with her humanitarian mission in May–July 2022, Aksenia Krupenko concluded that a locally based aid model would be more efficient – purchasing and processing food within Ukraine, rather than importing it from abroad. This approach would reduce logistics costs and support Ukrainian producers and job retention. The "Food for Good" program was launched on October 26, 2022.

The initiative introduced a Ukrainian factories produced 20-pound (9 kg) food box containing high-calorie products sufficient to feed a family of two to three for a week. These packages were distributed to families in need, children's hospitals, elderly individuals, and families of war veterans leaving in the most dangerous frontline regions of Ukraine.

The initiative garnered attention to the "Food for Good" humanitarian project in the United States. In December 2022 the charity dinner was organized by Revival Foundation in Washington, D.C. in Michelin-starred flagship Fiola restaurant. Italian American chef and restaurateur Fabio Trabocchi hosted a charity event at his restaurant, in solidarity with Ukraine.

The "Food for Good" brand is officially registered in Ukraine.

=== The Art of Saving Lives ===
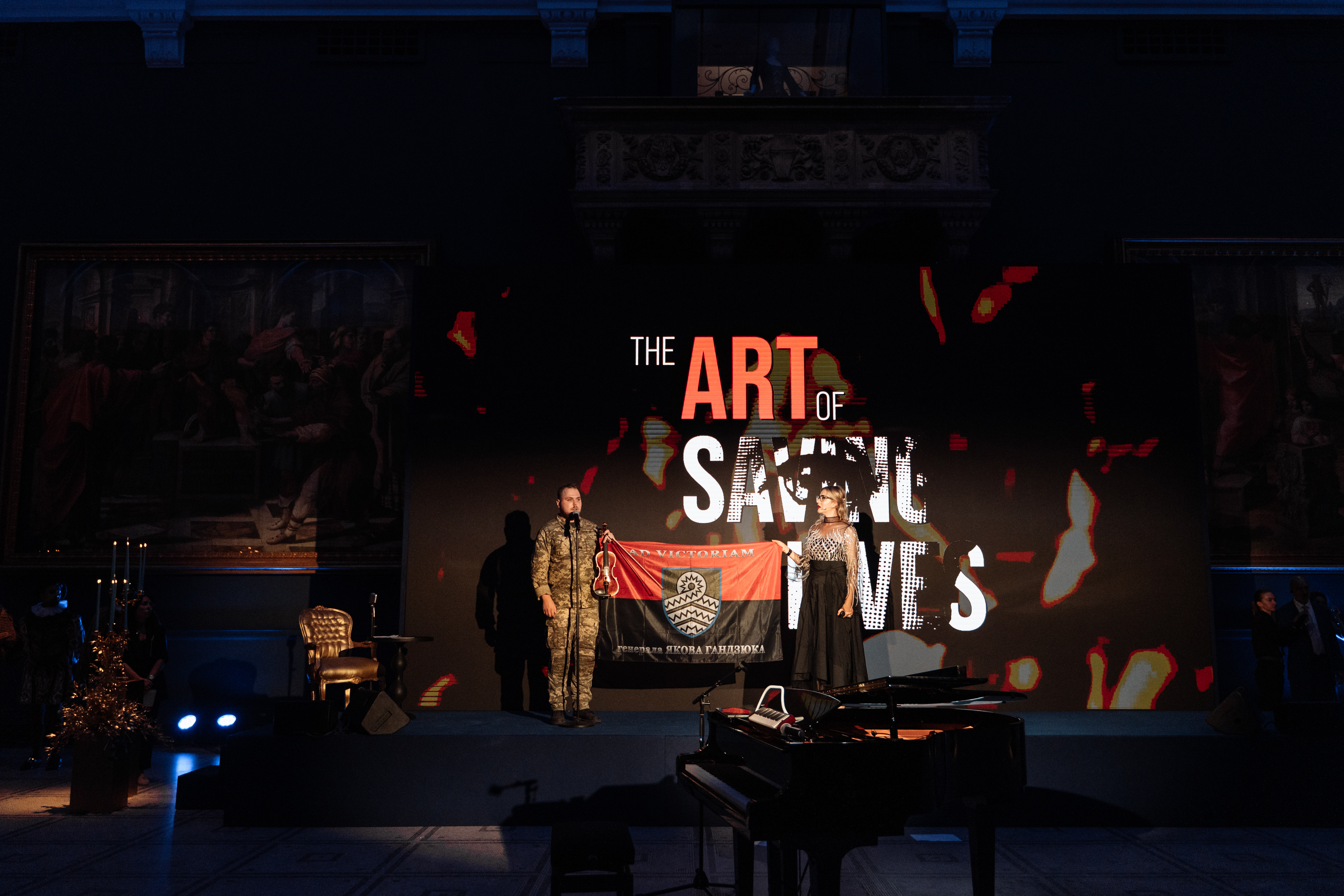
Moisei Bondarenko, a Ukrainian violinist and soldier of the Armed Forces of Ukraine and Natalia Voinova, associate director of Christie's during "The Art of Saving Lives" charity auction at Victoria & Albert Museum, August 22, 2024.

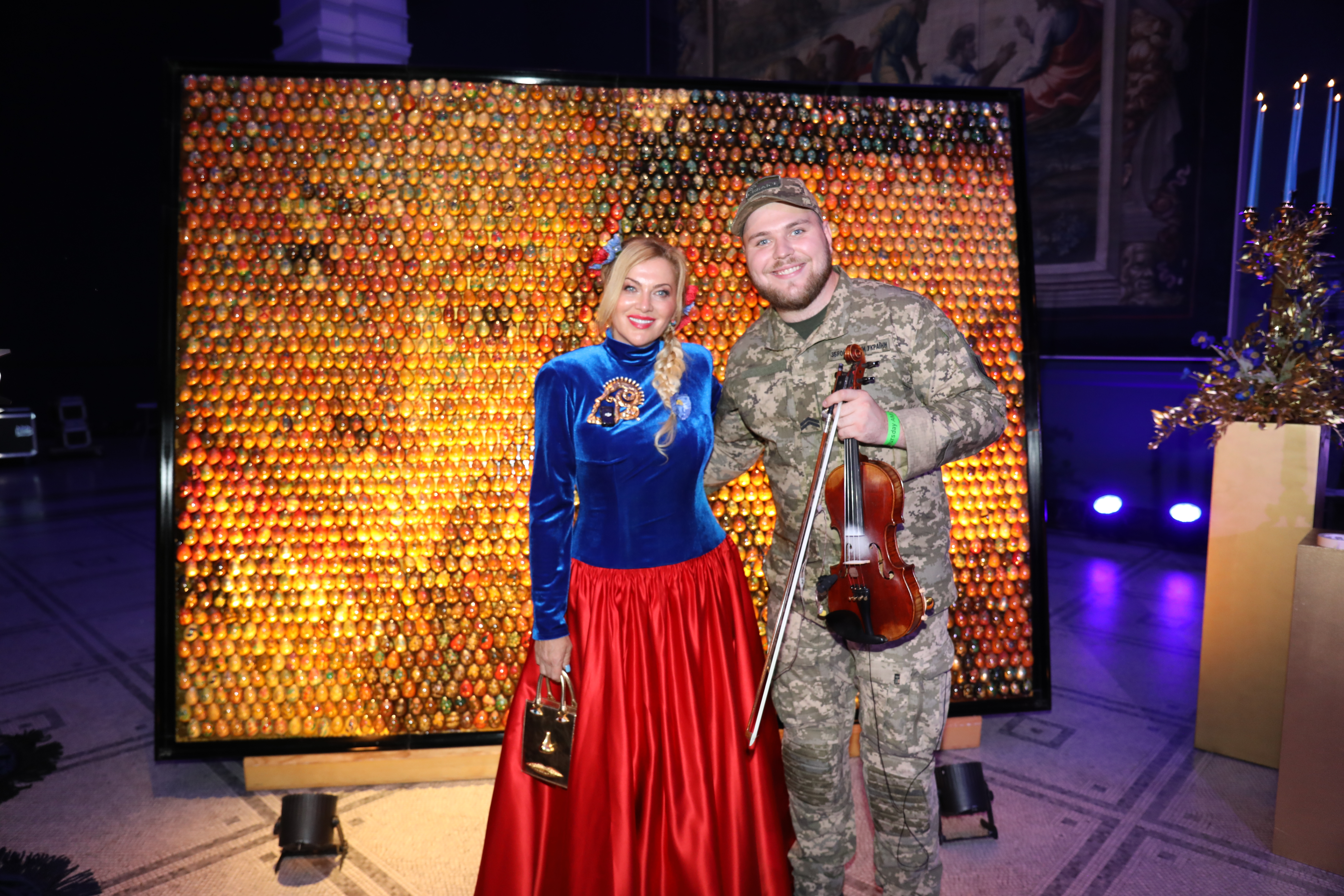
President of the Revival Foundation Aksenia Krupenko and violinist Moisei Bondarenko, during "The Art of Saving Lives" charity auction.

"The Art of Saving Lives" is a unique charity project that has five main goals: to empower creatives, preserve heritage, educate creators, facilitate cultural exchange, and "catalyze a creative Renaissance". The project's overall mission is to promote cultural unity and foster connections between Ukraine and countries worldwide.

On August 22, 2024, the Revival Foundation organised the Gala Auction Dinner dedicated to the "Art of Saving Lives" in the Victoria and Albert Museum (London) in the Raphael Hall as an extraordinary event showcasing Ukraine's rich history, vibrant present, and promising future. The auction was presided over by Christie's. The project is an initiative of Aksenia Krupenko. Guests from 15 countries attended the gala.

Artworks by Oksana Mas, Zhanna Kadyrova, Arsen Savadov, Nazar Bilyk, Artem Volokitin, Lina Condes, Meshi / Kepler, Kyryl Yelchyts and Volodymyr Koziuk were auctioned during the charity fundraiser. "Angels", a mosaic panel by Oksana Mas, was previously exhibited at the 54th Venice Biennale in 2011.

The event featured the screening of the 3D documentary Murals (3D artist: Artem Ivanenko, Ukraine; produced by Aggressive, USA; art direction and animation by Tigrelab, Spain; production by ATM Virtual, Poland), supported by Ministry of Culture of Ukraine and the Polish Film Institute. The film premiered at the 2023 Cannes Film Festival and documents Banksy's murals painted on buildings destroyed in the Kyiv Oblast, Ukraine. Additional auction lots included a private concert by Ukrainian virtuoso pianist and composer Yevgen Khmara, a signature dinner by Ukrainian culinary ambassador Yuri Kovryzhenko, and the violin of Moisei Bondarenko, which he used during performances for Ukrainian soldiers.

"The Art of Saving Lives" project emphasizes cultural unity and the significant role of the support of Ukrainian culture as a form of Resistance to Russian aggression and help to fight back against Russia. The funds raised support the creation of the "Healing Garden", a therapeutic art spaces for children affected by the war in Ukraine and go toward supporting Ukrainian artists participating in the auction, as well as artists who continue their professional activities in Ukraine during the war. The charity gala was generously supported by philanthropists Donald and Johanna Hoffman (Washington D.C., USA), philanthropists and art collectors Ivor Ichikowitz (South Africa), Olga Yakovenko (Kyiv, Ukraine / London, UK), and Adam Kharlampovych (Lutsk, Ukraine).

== Structure ==
Revival Foundation was founded by Aksenia Krupenko, co-founders are Temuri Yakobashvili and Bohdana Urbanovych. The organization relies on a network of volunteers in both the United States and Ukraine. Aid is delivered directly to recipients and also distributed through partnerships with Ukrainian charitable foundations, hospitals, local volunteer groups and American pharmaceutical and medical companies.

Board of Directors:

- President and CEO: Aksenia Krupenko.
- Board Member: Temuri Yakobashvili (Trustee), Bohdana Urbanovych (Treasurer).
