= Fresh One Productions =

British production company

Fresh One Productions is a television production company set up by chef Jamie Oliver in 2001. Now trading as Jamie Oliver Productions.

Notable series include:

- Jamie's Kitchen First production, in 2001
- Jamie's School Dinners (won award for 'Best Factual Series or Strand' at the British Academy Television Awards 2006)
- Jamie at Home
- Jamie Oliver's Food Revolution (won award for 'Outstanding Reality Program' at the Primetime Emmys in 2010)
- Jamie's Dream School
- Jamie's 15-Minute Meals a 40 episode series which aired in 2012
- Two Greedy Italians -2012
