= Jamie Oliver's Food Revolution =

2010 American TV series

- Promotional poster
- Also known as: Jamie's American Food Revolution (UK)
- Genre: Reality
- Created by: Jamie Oliver
- Presented by: Jamie Oliver
- Country of origin: United States
- Original language: English
- No. of seasons: 2
- No. of episodes: 12

Production
- Executive producers: Ryan Seacrest; Jamie Oliver
- Production locations: Huntington, West Virginia (season 1); Los Angeles, California (season 2)
- Running time: 60 minutes
- Production companies: Fresh One Productions; Ryan Seacrest Productions

Original release
- Network: ABC
- Release: March 21, 2010 – June 24, 2011

Jamie Oliver's Food Revolution (retitled Jamie's American Food Revolution in the United Kingdom) is a reality television series on ABC from March 2010 until summer 2011. The show was produced by British chef Jamie Oliver and Ryan Seacrest, following Oliver as he attempted to reform the US school lunch programs, help American society fight obesity, and change their eating habits to live healthier and longer lives.

== Premise ==
The show premiered on ABC on March 21, 2010, in the UK on Channel 4 on September 13, 2010, in Greece on Fox Life Greece in November 2010 and in Italy on Raisat Gambero Rosso Channel in January 2011. Oliver, a celebrity chef and health campaigner in the United Kingdom, used a grassroots campaign in the US to curb obesity. In the first season, his efforts were focused in Huntington, West Virginia, statistically one of the unhealthiest cities in the country. In an early trailer for the show, Oliver challenged a group of first-grade schoolchildren to identify fruits and vegetables, and they were unable to do so. The show appeared to combine the concepts from at least two of his previous TV series' campaigns in the UK: Jamie's Ministry of Food and Jamie's School Dinners.

In the second season, Oliver took his food revolution to Los Angeles, California, home to the US's 2nd largest public school district. Much of the season revolved around the Los Angeles Unified School District board of education's refusals to allow him to film in schools and his subsequent attempts to circumvent their decisions in creative ways.

In the April 12, 2011 episode, Oliver decried the use of pink slime in American ground meat and school lunches. In the episode, Oliver explained what the product is and why he was repelled by it. He utilized artistic license in demonstrating the concept by immersing beef trimmings in liquid ammonia, rather than gaseous ammonia, as in the meat industry. Oliver has stated, "Everyone who is told about 'pink slime' doesn't like it in their food—school kids, soldiers, senior citizens all hate it." The American Meat Institute and Beef Products Inc. responded with a three-minute YouTube infomercial.

== Reception ==
In 2010, Jamie Oliver's Food Revolution was nominated for the Do Something TV Show Award from the VH1 Do Something Awards for promoting healthy eating at public schools. The show also won an Emmy Award for Outstanding Reality Program.

The show was renewed for a second six-episode season on September 2, 2010. The season premiered on Tuesday April 12, 2011, at 8:00 pm Eastern/7:00 pm Central. After two episodes, the show was cancelled because of poor ratings and replaced by repeats of Dancing with the Stars. ABC aired the remaining four episodes in June; because of this, episodes 3-6 aired in the United Kingdom on Channel 4 before the United States.

== U.S. ratings ==
=== Season 1 (2010) ===
Episode number	Episode	Airdate	Rating	Share	Rating/share (18-49)	Viewers (millions)	Rank (timeslot)	Rank (night)
1	"Episode 101"	March 21, 2010	4.1	7	2.2/6	6.20	3	9
2	"Episode 102"	March 26, 2010	4.6	8	2.6/8	7.51	2	4
3	"Episode 103"	April 2, 2010	2.8	5	1.5/5	4.31	1	3
4	"Episode 104"	April 9, 2010	3.1	5	1.6/5	7.72	2	2
5	"Episode 105"	April 16, 2010	2.7	5	1.4/5	7.09	1	2
6	"Episode 106"	April 23, 2010	2.5	4	1.3/4	7.91	2	3

=== Season 2 (2011) ===
Episode number	Episode	Original airdate	Rating	Share	Rating/share (18-49)	Viewers (millions)	Rank (timeslot)	Rank (night)
1	"Episode 201 - "Maybe L.A. Was a Big Mistake"	April 12, 2011	3.4	5	1.5/5	5.36	TBA	TBA
2	"Episode 202 - "I Think I Found a Loophole"	April 19, 2011	TBA	TBA	1.1/5	4.70	TBA	TBA
3	"Episode 203 - "Is It Me or Have We Just Been Pushed Into a Corner?"	June 3, 2011	TBA	TBA	0.8/3	2.40	TBA	TBA
4	"Episode 204 - "We’re Going To Go Guerrilla"	June 10, 2011	TBA	TBA	0.8/3	2.59	TBA	TBA
5	"Episode 205 - "Feed Them Healthy Food With 77 Cents"	June 17, 2011	TBA	TBA	0.8/3	2.50	TBA	TBA
6	"Episode 206 - "A New Start, a New Chance"	June 24, 2011	TBA	TBA	0.8/3	2.58	TBA	TBA

== Awards and nominations ==
Year	Presenter	Award	Result
2010	Emmy Awards	Outstanding Reality Program	Won
2012	Emmy Awards	Outstanding Reality Program	Nominated
