= Jamie's Kitchen Australia =

Television series

Fifteen Melbourne Logo

Jamie's Kitchen Australia is a 10 part Australian television show which premiered Thursday 14 September 2006 on Network Ten. The show stars international chef Jamie Oliver and Tobie Puttock. Puttock is a friend of Oliver's and having previously worked for Oliver in England, is in charge of establishing the restaurant, Fifteen Melbourne.

Based upon the original Jamie's Kitchen that aired in 2002 in the UK, 25 disadvantaged youth were selected to train and hopefully become part of the staff at the newly opened Fifteen restaurant in Melbourne. Prior to the opening of the restaurant, initial training of the young apprentice chefs took place at Box Hill Institute of TAFE.

Fifteen was located at 115 Collins Street, Melbourne, replacing Mo Mo restaurant. Fifteen was opened to the public from 22 September 2006. However, it has now closed, being replaced by another restaurant called The Kitchen Cat which opened in 2011 also run by Tobie Puttock. The Kitchen Cat is also now closed.

== See also ==
- List of Australian television series
- List of cooking shows
