= Jamie Does... =

2011 British documentary TV series

- Genre: Documentary
- Created by: Nicola Gooch
- Directed by: Lana Salah
- Presented by: Jamie Oliver
- Country of origin: United Kingdom
- Original language: English
- No. of series: 1
- No. of episodes: 6

Production
- Executive producer: Nicola Gooch
- Camera setup: Mike Sarah, Luke Cardiff, Dave Miller, Simon Weekes, Peter Bateson, Louis Caulfield, Craig Loveridge, Olly Wiggins
- Production company: Fresh One Productions

Original release
- Network: Channel 4
- Release: 16 February – 23 March 2011

Jamie Oliver's Food Escapes is a 2011 television docu-series in which Chef Jamie Oliver travels across Europe and North Africa to find authentic ingredients and extraordinary characters. The series was released under the British title Jamie Does... in 2010 on Channel 4. Oliver stops in Venice, Athens, the French Pyrenees, Andalusia, Stockholm and Marrakesh and uses local ingredients in each location to prepare recipes as well as meet various locals. He immerses himself in the cultures, learning traditional cooking practices from the locals and taking part in their cultural ceremonies.

== Episodes ==
No.	Title	Original release date
1	"Venice"	16 February 2011
Oliver travels to in Venice and gets away from the tourist traps and experiencing the delicious authentic tastes the real Venice has to offer. He tries his hand at fishing and cooks up Spaghetti alle vongole for local fishermen. He learns the secret to making the best risotto in the world from a top head chef, cooks three versions, also prepares a beef carpaccio, learns how to make a peach bellini and a perfect Venetian tiramisu with his mentor Gennaro Contaldo.
2	"Athens"	23 February 2011
Oliver cooks pork kebabs with the Acropolis of Athens in the background, unsuccessfully tries his hand at wrapping souvlaki as fast as the local staff and joins locals for meze and Greek dancing. He also makes a Greek desert with locally-sourced honey milks, a goat with a priest, prepares a perfect Greek salad, cooks a fish stew using seawater and freshly fished fish and cooks fresh tuna straight from the sea on the beach.
3	"French Pyrenees"	2 March 2011
Oliver visits the French Pyrenees, in villages surrounding Toulouse. After eating various meat cuts at a local market, he makes an apple Tarte Tatin. At a bread-making joint, he is inducted as a member and uses one sourdough bread to make a salad. Next he joins truffle-hunting with a greedy pig, helps a local lady cook lunch at her restaurant and joining locals on a wild boar hunt. He further shows viewers how to make confit of duck using several pre-cooked ducks and makes a pork terrine.
4	"Andalucia"	9 March 2011
Oliver travels to Andalucia, where watches Matador training and tries tapas. He helps make paella for a whole village, and cooks rabbit stew with some hunters. He also learns how to carve Jamón ibérico, prepares an authentic gazpacho, pork chops with Spanish beans. He visits a closed convent that sells traditional snacks. He further makes salt-roasted fish, an amazing tomato salad with chorizo, and a quail's egg breakfast with black pudding.
5	"Stockholm"	16 March 2011
Oliver travels to Stockholm, where he samples reindeer heart, a fermented herring that smells like a stink bomb, and also picks wild mushrooms on a private island, makes Swedish deserts and a one with blueberries. He also makes pike perch for a member of the Swedish Royal Guards and gravadlax.
6	"Marrakesh"	23 March 2011
Oliver's in Morocco, dodging snake charmers to try out the street food of Marrakesh, like slow-roasted lamb in cumin, and almond and rose water cakes. Later he joins a family for some Moroccan home cooking, and makes his own versions of chicken and lemon tagine, Moroccan roast lamb, and a `snakey cake' made of filo pastry, almonds and rose petals. He further makes a tangia.
