= Eighteen Chefs =

Restaurant

Eighteen Chefs is a restaurant chain and franchise company in Singapore. It specializes in Western food, but local cuisine is also served. As of September 2020, Eighteen Chefs has a total of eleven outlets in Singapore.

== History ==
The first Eighteen Chefs outlet was opened in 2007, at Eastpoint Mall, by the ex-offender and former drug addict Benny Se Teo.

While on an internship with Jamie Oliver, he heard about the Fifteen Foundation. He started Eighteen Chefs along similar lines, and is now the director of the company in 2015.

In 2009, three outlets located at Yishun, Tiong Bahru and Buona Vista were closed due to financial losses.

== Awards ==
- 2009 Honoree – Spirit of Enterprise Award
- 2012 – Social Enterprise of the Year from President's Challenge
- 2013 – Emerging Enterprise award from The Business Times and OCBC Bank
- 2015 – RAS Epicurean Star Award 2015 for Best Chain (Western) Restaurant and overall Best of the Best Chain Restaurant
- 2015 – SME One Asia Award
