= Jamie's 15-Minute Meals =

2012 British cooking TV series

- Created by: Fresh One Productions
- Starring: Jamie Oliver (host)
- Narrated by: Jamie Oliver
- Opening theme: Buffalo Stance by Neneh Cherry
- Country of origin: United Kingdom
- Original language: English
- No. of seasons: 1
- No. of episodes: 40

Production
- Running time: 27 minutes

Original release
- Network: Channel 4
- Release: 22 October – 14 December 2012

Jamie's 15-Minute Meals is a British food lifestyle programme which aired on Channel 4 in 2012. In each half-hour episode, host Jamie Oliver creates two meals, with each meal taking 15 minutes to prepare.

The show premiered on 22 October 2012 and concluded with its series finale episode on 14 December 2012. A tie-in book of recipes was released on 27 September 2012.

On September 28, 2013, Jamie’s 15-Minute Meals aired in the United States on CBS as part of its Dream Team Saturday morning E/I programming block but ended airing on CBS on September 20, 2014.

== Episodes ==
=== Season 1 (2012) ===
No. overall	No. in season	Title	Original release date
1–01	1	"Chilli Con Carne Meatballs and Sticky Kicking Chicken"	22 October 2012
Jamie cooks chilli con carne meatballs, plus sticky kicking chicken, watermelon radish salad and crunchy noodles.
1–02	2	"Fish Stew and Asian Beef"	23 October 2012
On the menu are flashy fish stew, saffron sauce and garlic bread, plus seared Asian beef, best noodle salad and ginger dressing.
1–03	3	"Camembert Parcels and Golden Chicken"	24 October 2012
Jamie makes crispy Camembert parcels, autumn salad and cranberry dip, plus golden chicken with braised greens and potato gratin.
1–04	4	"Beef Stroganoff and Moroccan Mussels"	25 October 2012
Jamie rustles up a beef stroganoff with fluffy rice and red onion and parsley pickle (625 calories). Later he makes Moroccan mussels with tapenade toasties and cucumber salad.
1–05	5	"Malaysia: Fish Baps and Mushroom Farfalle"	26 October 2012
Jamie makes his best fish baps, mushy peas and tartare sauce. Later he cooks mushroom farfalle with blue cheese and a hazelnut and apple salad.
1–06	6	"Lamb Lollipops and Prawn Linguini"	29 October 2012
Jamie cooks lamb lollipops, curry sauce and rice and peas, plus prawn linguini and Sicilian shaved fennel salad.
1–07	7	"Chicken Dim Sum and Crab Briks"	30 October 2012
On the menu this time is chicken dim sum, coconut buns, cucumber pickle and hoi sin sauce, plus crackin' crab briks, couscous salad and salsa.
1–08	8	"Crispy Duck and Chicken Cacciatore"	31 October 2012
Jamie shows how to cook crispy duck and hoi sin lettuce parcels, and chicken cacciatore, spaghetti and smoky tomato sauce.
1–09	9	"Moroccan Bream and British Burgers"	1 November 2012
This time Jamie rustles up Moroccan bream, couscous salad, pomegranate and harissa, and British burgers, shred salad, pickles and things.
1–10	10	"Moroccan Jerk Pork and Poached Chicken"	2 November 2012
This time it's jerk pork, grilled corn and crunchy tortilla salad, plus minestrone, poached chicken and salsa verde.
1–11	11	"Swedish meatballs and pasta pesto"	5 November 2012
Jamie cooks Swedish meatballs, celeriac and spinach rice, plus pasta pesto, garlic and rosemary chicken.
1–12	12	"Green tea salmon and modern greek salad"	6 November 2012
On the menu in this edition are green tea salmon, coconut rice and miso greens, plus modern greek salad, spinach, chickpea and feta parcels.
1–13	13	"Grilled steak and blackened chicken"	7 November 2012
This edition's recipes are grilled steak, ratatouille and saffron rice, plus blackened chicken, and San Fran quinoa salad.
1–14	14	"Porks steaks and killer kedgeree"	8 November 2012
Jamie rustles up pork steaks, Hungarian pepper sauce and rice, plus killer kedgeree, beans, greens and chilli yoghurt (474 calories).
1–15	15	"Rosemary chicken and happy cow burgers"	9 November 2012
On the menu are rosemary chicken, grilled polenta and porcini tomato sauce, plus happy cow burgers, old-school coleslaw and corn on the cob.
1–16	16	"Sticky squid balls and grilled prawns"	12 November 2012
Jamie cooks sticky squid balls, grilled prawns and noodle broth (489 calories), plus sausage fusilli and creamy garden salad.
1–17	17	"Greek chicken and smoked salmon"	13 November 2012
On the menu is smoked salmon, Yorkshire pud, beets and asparagus, plus gorgeous Greek chicken, sweet pepper and pea couscous with tzatziki (683 calories).
1–18	18	"Sizzling chops and asparagus lasagnetti"	14 November 2012
This time Jamie cooks glazed sizzling chops, sweet tomato and asparagus lasagnetti, plus mushroom soup, stilton, apple and walnut croutes.
1–19	19	"Asian tuna and coconut rice"	15 November 2012
Jamie rustles up seared Asian tuna, coconut rice and jiggy jiggy greens, plus ricotta fritters, tomato sauce and courgette salad.
1–20	20	"Falafel wraps and spiced chicken lentils"	16 November 2012
This time the meal is spiced chicken, bacon, asparagus and spinach lentils, plus falafel wraps, grilled veg and salsa (602 calories).
1–21	21	"Grilled Tuna and Thai Chicken"	19 November 2012
Jamie cooks grilled tuna, kinda Nicoise salad, Thai chicken laksa and mildly-spiced noodle squash broth (656 calories).
1–22	22	"Lamb Tagine and Chicken Caesar Salad"	20 November 2012
Quick lamb tagine, pan-fried aubergine and cumin crunch, plus crispy polenta chicken caesar salad.
1–23	23	"Fettuccine and Black Bean Beef Burgers"	21 November 2012
This time it's fettuccine, smoked trout, asparagus and peas, and black bean beef burgers, noodles and pickle salad.
1–24	24	"Pork Marsala and Thai Noodles"	22 November 2012
On the menu is pork Marsala, porcini rice and spring greens (572 calories), plus koh samui salad, chilli tofu and Thai noodles.
1–25	25	"Crispy Pork and Grilled Mushroom Sub"	23 November 2012
On the menu is crispy Parma pork, minted courgettes and brown rice, plus grilled mushroom sub, smoky pancetta, melted cheese and pears.
1–26	26	"Chicken Fajitas and King Prawns"	26 November 2012
Jamie cooks sizzling chicken fajitas, grilled peppers, salsa, rice and beans (616 calories), and prawn cocktail, king prawns and sundried pan bread (525 calories).
1–27	27	"Sizzling Beef Steak and Mighty Mackerel"	27 November 2012
On the menu is sizzling beef steak, hoi sin prawn and noodle bowls, mighty mackerel, and mixed tomato and quinoa salad.
1–28	28	"Steak, Liver and Bacon and Mexican Tomato Soup"	28 November 2012
Jamie cooks up some steak, liver and bacon, bubble and squeak mash and red onion gravy, and Mexican tomato soup, chilli nachos, and veggie and feta sprinkles.
1–29	29	"Glazed Pork Fillet and Tapas Bruschetta"	29 November 2012
Jamie makes glazed pork fillet, cajun-style pepper rice and barbecue sauce, and tapas bruschetta, and golden grilled sardines.
1–30	30	"Lamb Kofte and Keralan Veggie Curry"	30 November 2012
On the menu this time is lamb kofte, pitta and greek salad (587 calories), and Keralan veggie curry, poppadoms, rice and minty yoghurt.
1–31	31	"White Fish Tagine and Spicy Cajun Chicken"	3 December 2012
Jamie cooks white fish tagine, with carrot, mint and clementine salad, plus Spicy Cajun chicken, smashed sweet potato and fresh corn salsa.
1–32	32	"Beef Kofta Curry and Spring Frittata"	4 December 2012
On the menu in this episode are beef kofta curry, fluffy rice, beans and peas (706 calories), plus spring frittata, tomato toasts, watercress and pea salad.
1–33	33	"Chorizo and Squid, and Simple Spaghetti"	5 December 2012
Jamie cooks chorizo and squid with greek-style couscous salad (634 calories), plus simple spaghetti, tomato, basil and creamy curd salad.
1–34	34	"Lamb Meatballs and Chicken Salad"	6 December 2012
Jamie rustles up lamb meatballs, chop salad and harissa yoghurt, plus incredibly delicious chicken salad.
1–35	35	"Crab Bolognese and Mexican BLT"	7 December 2012
Jamie cooks crab bolognese with crunchy fennel salad, plus Mexican BLT, chillies, guacamole and salad.
1–36	36	"Cajun Steak and Chicken Tikka"	10 December 2012
Jamie cooks Cajun steak, smoky baked beans and collard greens, plus chicken tikka, lentil, spinach and naan salad.
1–37	37	"Noodle Broth and Veggie Chilli"	11 December 2012
On the menu this time is squid 'n' prawns spicy vegetable noodle broth, plus veggie chilli, crunchy tortilla and avocado salad.
1–38	38	"Asian Fish and Ultimate Pork Tacos"	12 December 2012
Jamie shows how to prepare in 15 minutes both Asian fish, miso noodles and crunchy veg, and ultimate pork tacos, spicy black beans and avocado garden salad.
1–39	39	"Sausage Gnocchi and Mexican Chicken"	13 December 2012
This time the two meals cooked up in a quarter of an hour are sausage gnocchi, warm kale and bean salad, plus Mexican chicken, wicked mole sauce, veg and rice.
1–40	40	"Asian Sea Bass and Chorizo Carbonara"	14 December 2012
Jamie Oliver cooks Asian sea bass, sticky rice and dressed greens, plus chorizo carbonara and Catalan market salad.

== Notes ==
Early episodes of the show used "Buffalo Stance" by Neneh Cherry as the theme tune and background music.
