= Gennaro Contaldo =

Italian chef and restaurateur

Gennaro Contaldo OSI
- Born: 20 January 1949 (age 77); Minori, Campania, Italy
- Culinary career
- Cooking style: Italian cuisine
- Current restaurant(s): Jamie's Italian, London
- Television show(s): Saturday Kitchen Great Food Live Breakfast The Way We Cooked The Food Programme Self-Sufficiency Fresh Food

Gennaro Contaldo OSI (Italian pronunciation: [dʒenˈnaːro konˈtaldo]; born 20 January 1949) is an Italian chef known for his association with his British protégé, Jamie Oliver, and his partnership with fellow Italian chef Antonio Carluccio and their BBC Two television series Two Greedy Italians.

== Early life ==
Contaldo grew up in the small village of Minori on the Amalfi Coast, developing his love for food from days he spent hunting with his father and grandfather, and collecting herbs for his mother. He began working in local restaurants at the age of eight.

== Career ==
Contaldo left Italy in 1969 for England where he worked in the kitchen at Barnet General hospital. He married in 1974 and had three children - he later had two more children with his current wife, Liz Przybylski. He briefly established an Italian antiques business before returning to cooking. Contaldo's inspiration to cook in England was partly due to the availability of game and fungi, both important components of Amalfitan cuisine. In media interviews, Contaldo has frequently voiced his enthusiasm for foraged wild food, especially mushrooms.

Contaldo later worked for popular London restaurants in St John's Wood, and at Antonio Carluccio's Neal Street Restaurant in London's Covent Garden. He left Neal Street in 1998.

Together with Liz, Contaldo opened the Passione restaurant, in Charlotte Street, London, in 1999. Passione was awarded 'Best Italian Restaurant 2005' by the Tio Pepe Restaurant Awards. Passione closed in March 2009 due to decreased business as a result of the late-2000s recession.

In April 2003, Contaldo published his first cookbook, Passione, which is dedicated to the Amalfitan style of cooking. The cookbook won 'Gourmand World Cookbook - Best Italian Cuisine Book' for 2003. His second book, Gennaro's Italian Year, was published in September 2006. His third book, Gennaro's Italian Home Cooking, was published in September 2008, and his fourth, Gennaro's Easy Italian, was published in March 2010. He has since published many books on Italian cuisine including Limoni, Cucina and recently Hidden Italy.

Contaldo is also known for his association with Jamie Oliver, whom he first met at Neal Street Restaurant in the 1990s. The two chefs have since maintained a close friendship and professional relationship. Oliver even once put up a reward for information when Contaldo's restaurant, Passione, was burgled in 2003. Contaldo has appeared on many of Oliver's television shows, such as The Naked Chef. He made a comic appearance as one of Oliver's sous-chefs on Food Network's Iron Chef America, in a battle against famed Italian-American chef Mario Batali. Contaldo also developed menus for Oliver's UK restaurant chain Jamie's Italian, in which he is a business partner.

In 2011 he toured the Italian regions alongside Antonio Carluccio in a four-part series for the BBC, "The Two Greedy Italians". This was followed up by a second series which aired in 2012, "The Two Greedy Italians: Still Hungry".

Contaldo has made cooking appearances on numerous other television shows. On BBC1's Saturday morning show Saturday Kitchen, he set a record of 16.36 seconds for making a three-egg omelette. In 2014 he was also awarded a Guinness World Record for the most ravioli made in two minutes.

Contaldo is a brand ambassador for the Italian holiday company Citalia.

Since 2010, when he founded it, Contaldo has uploaded regularly on his YouTube channel. He also often appears on Jamie Oliver's YouTube channel. As of September 2025, Contaldo's channel has received over 42 million views and he has 646,000 subscribers.

== Media ==
=== Television appearances ===
- The Food Programme (1996-2006 - 2 programmes)
- Breakfast (1997-2006 - 2 programmes)
- Fresh Food (4 August 1999)
- Self-Sufficiency (22 October 2000)
- The Naked Chef - The Italian Job (2001)
- Saturday Kitchen (2001- 2024 - 10+ programmes)
- Jamie's Kitchen (2002)
- The Way We Cooked (2002 - 2003 - 3 programmes)
- Ruby (16 May 2002)
- Jim Davidson's Generation Game (2002)
- Return to Jamie's Kitchen (2003)
- Jamie's School Dinners (2005)
- Jamie's Australian Diary (2006)
- Jamie at Home (2007)
- Jamie At Home Christmas Special (2007)
- Iron Chef America - Served as one of Jamie Oliver's sous chefs during his battle with Mario Batali (2007)
- Cooking the Books (2008)
- Jamie Cooks.... Christmas (2008)
- Oliver's Twist (2009)
- Jamie's Family Christmas (2009)
- Rachel Allen: Home Cooking (30 January 2010)
- Jamie Does (2010)
- Fern (April 2011)
- Two Greedy Italians (2011) with Antonio Carluccio
- Jamie Cooks Summer (2011)
- Jamie's Christmas Lock-In (2011)
- Jamie & Jimmy's Food Fight Club - Episode 3 (2012)
- Two Greedy Italians: Still Hungry (2012) with Antonio Carluccio
- Food and Drink (2014)
- Jamie's Comfort Food (2014)
- Antiques Road Trip (2016)
- Jamie Cooks Italy (2018)
- Stanley Tucci: Searching for Italy - London (2022)

=== Radio Appearances ===
- Woman's Hour (BBC Radio 4) 13 September 2004

=== Books ===
- Passione (2003)
- Gennaro's Italian Year (2006)
- Gennaro's Italian Home Cooking (2008)
- Gennaro's Easy Italian (2010)
- Two Greedy Italians (2011)
- Two Greedy Italians Eat Italy (2012)
- Gennaro: Let's Cook Italian (2012) (Pavilion)
- Gennaro: Slow Cook Italian (2015) (Pavilion)
- Panetteria: Gennaro's Italian Bakery (2016) (Interlink Books)
- Gennaro's Fast Cook Italian (2018) (Pavilion)
- Gennaro's Pasta Perfecto! (August 19, 2019) (Pavilion)
- Gennaro's Limoni: Vibrant Italian Recipes Celebrating the Lemon (October 12, 2021) (Pavilion)
- Gennaro's Cucina Rustica (February 2, 2023 - UK Release Date) (Pavilion)
- Gennaro's Verdure (March 14, 2024 - UK Release Date) (Pavilion)
- Slow (October 24, 2024 - UK Release Date) (Pavilion)
- Hidden Italy (February 2026 - UK Release Date) (Pavilion)
