= Two Greedy Italians =

- Genre: Cooking
- Presented by: Antonio Carluccio; Gennaro Contaldo
- Country of origin: United Kingdom
- Original language: English
- No. of series: 2
- No. of episodes: 8

Production
- Running time: 60 minutes

Original release
- Network: BBC Two
- Release: 4 May 2011 – 17 May 2012

Two Greedy Italians is a BBC television series that first aired on BBC Two in the UK on 4 May 2011. The series saw the chefs Gennaro Contaldo and Antonio Carluccio travelling around Italy to see how society and food has evolved over the years. It was produced by Nicola Gooch. An accompanying cookery book was produced for the series. A second series (entitled Two Greedy Italians: Still Hungry) was broadcast in April and May 2012. The series has also been sold and broadcast internationally, including on the Australian channels ABC and SBS, the Swedish broadcaster SVT and the Norwegian broadcaster NRK.

== Episodes ==
Series 1

- The Family (first broadcast 4 May 2011): Antonio and Gennaro return to Italy to discover what has changed in Italian culture;
- Poor Man's Food (broadcast 11 May 2011): The two chefs tour Campania and learn how poverty in the area created Italy's best-loved dishes;
- Regional Pride (first broadcast 18 May 2011): Antonio returns to his home town of Borgofranco, in the Italian Piedmont region;
- Saints and Miracles (first broadcast 25 May 2011): Atheist Antonio and devout Catholic Gennaro eat their way along a culinary pilgrimage through Apulia's monasteries, holy shrines and festivals.

Series 2

- Calabria and Bambinone (first broadcast 19 April 2012): Antonio and Gennaro begin the second series investigating how children's food in Italy has changed since they were young.
- Liguria and La Bella Figura (first broadcast 26 April 2012): The two chefs tour Portofino and observe how Italy's social history has created a culture which admires superficial accoutrements.
- The Alps and Arrangiarsi (first broadcast 10 May 2012): Arrangiarsi means the art of making do, and Antonio and Gennaro travel through Northern Italy exploring Italian resourcefulness.
- Lazio and Machismo (first broadcast 17 May 2012): The pair travel to Rome to look at how modern Italian men live.
