= Antonio Carluccio =

Italian chef and restaurateur (1937–2017)

Antonio Carluccio OBE OMRI
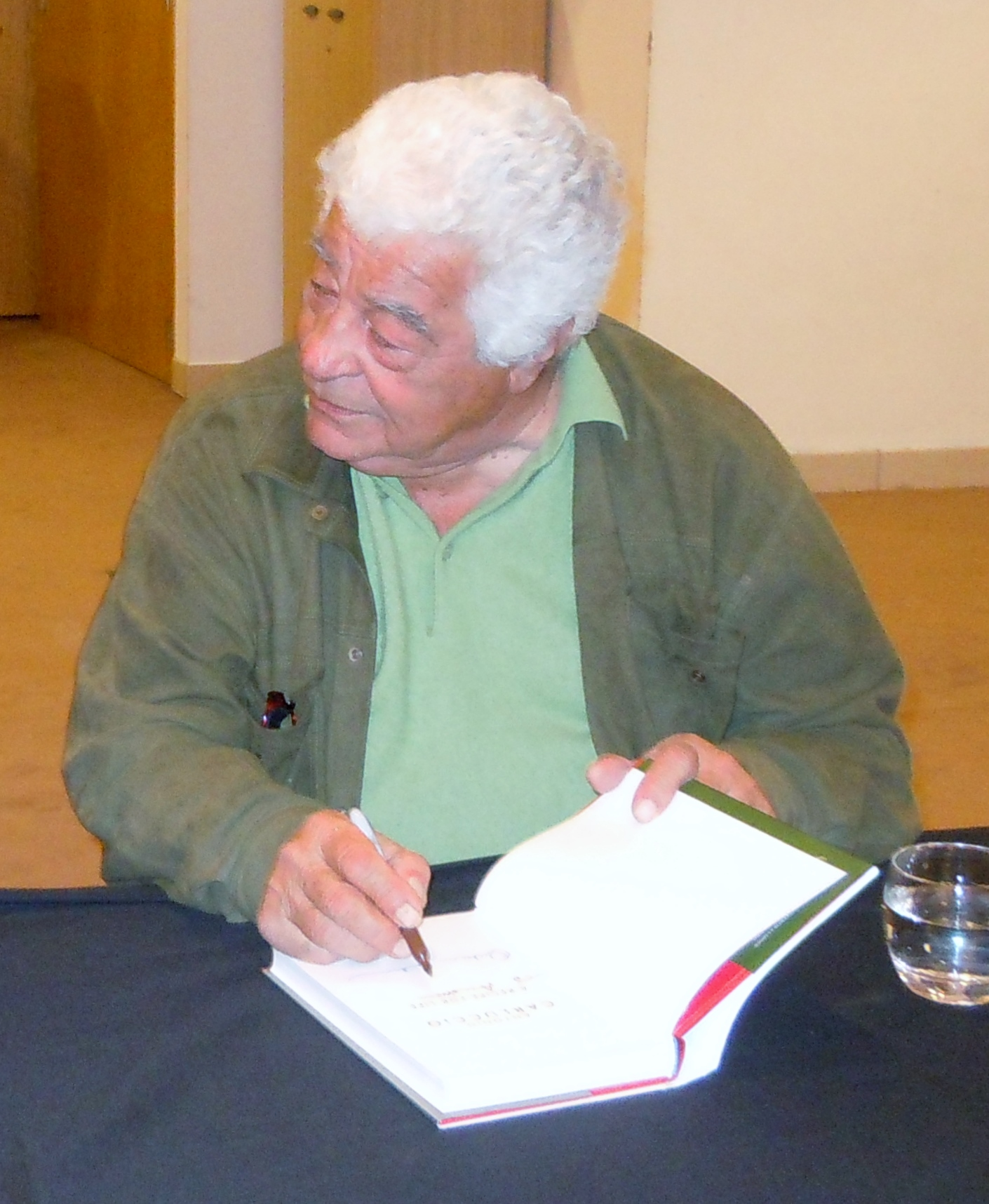
- Carluccio in 2013
- Born: 19 April 1937; Vietri sul Mare, Campania, Italy
- Died: 8 November 2017 (aged 80); London, England
- Occupations: Chef; author; businessman
- Years active: 1958–2014
- Known for: Cookery; books; owner of Carluccio's
- Spouse: 3, including Priscilla Conran
- Website: www.antonio-carluccio.co.uk

Antonio Carluccio, OBE, OMRI (Italian: [anˈtɔːnjo karˈluttʃo]; 19 April 1937 – 8 November 2017) was an Italian chef, restaurateur and food expert, based in London. He was called "the godfather of Italian gastronomy", with a career of more than 50 years. He is perhaps best remembered for his television appearances, including his partnership with fellow Italian chef Gennaro Contaldo, and their BBC Two television series Two Greedy Italians.

== Early life ==
Antonio Carluccio was born in Vietri sul Mare, Salerno, in the Campania region, the fifth of six children of Giovanni Carluccio, a stationmaster from a family of Benevento bookbinders, and his wife Maria, née Trivellone.

He moved with his father's job when he was young and lived in Castelnuovo Belbo and Borgofranco d'Ivrea. Living in the northwest, an area with great vegetation, as a child he would hunt through the forest for different mushrooms and fungi with his father. After leaving school he did his compulsory one year of military service in the Italian Navy. After leaving the navy, he briefly worked as a journalist with La Stampa in Turin and then as a technician and sales representative for typewriter manufacturer Olivetti.

== Career ==
Carluccio moved to Vienna at age 21 to study languages. He lived in Germany from 1962 to 1975, working as a wine merchant in Hamburg. He came to the United Kingdom in 1975 to work as a wine merchant, importing Italian wines.

He became the manager of Terence Conran's (his brother-in-law) Neal Street Restaurant in London's Covent Garden in 1981, and its owner in 1989. Under Carluccio, British celebrity chef Jamie Oliver began his professional career at the Neal Street Restaurant, which closed in 2006.

Carluccio wrote twenty books on Italian cuisine. He appeared on BBC television in the Food and Drink Programme, and in his own series Antonio Carluccio's Italian Feasts in 1996. In 2011, his travels around Italy with Gennaro Contaldo were filmed for the four-part BBC Two series Two Greedy Italians; a second series, Two Greedy Italians: Still Hungry was shown the following year.

In 2012, he was awarded the AA Lifetime Achievement Award and released his autobiography, A Recipe For Life.

In September 2021, it was announced that the Antonio Carluccio Library and Archive had opened at Oxford Brookes University.

== Carluccio's ==
In 1991, Antonio and his then wife opened an Italian food shop which they named Carluccio's. They expanded this in 1994 to a wholesale business.

In 1999, the first "Carluccio's Caffè" was opened in Market Place, London. A joint authentic Italian restaurant with integrated food shop, the premises opened to serve light, Italian-based breakfasts to diners. The chain expanded, initially across southeast England, and subsequently across the UK. In 2005, Carluccio's was quoted on the Alternative Investment Market.

In 2007, it was reported that the company paid waiting staff less than the UK minimum wage, and expected staff to make up the remaining remuneration through customers' tips. Soon after this was revealed, UK law was changed to ensure that companies must meet the minimum required remuneration themselves and that tips should not be counted towards an employee's paid salary.

In 2010, the company received a takeover offer from the Landmark Group, a Dubai-based enterprise, valuing Carluccio's at £90m. The transaction was approved by the shareholders and completed in October 2010.

Carluccio's operated from over 80 UK locations. In addition, the company has granted franchises over two territories: the first over Ireland with two locations open in Dublin; the second over six countries in the Middle East including three locations presently open in Dubai. After ten years of development, Antonio rejoined the company as a consultant.

The chain went into administration in March 2020, and was partially acquired by Boparan Holdings in May 2020.

== Personal life ==
Carluccio had three marriages, each of which ended in a divorce. His third wife was Priscilla Conran (the sister of Terence Conran). He was also childless.

Carluccio was the 'castaway' on the 11 July 2008 edition of BBC Radio 4's Desert Island Discs, where he was interviewed by Kirsty Young. Carluccio chose the Finale from The Carnival of the Animals by Camille Saint-Saëns as his favourite record, Philip Pullman's His Dark Materials trilogy as his choice of book, and white truffles as his luxury item.

He suffered from depression for many years, stemming from the death of his brother and the failure of his marriages. In 2008 Carluccio attempted suicide with a pair of scissors, but survived following the intervention of his personal assistant. At the time of the incident, the media were informed that he had had an accident with a bread knife. Carluccio later described his suicide attempt as "liberating", feeling that "from that moment on, my mind changed" and stating that his subsequent admittance to the Priory clinic made him "take stock of my life, and appreciate all the good in it".

Carluccio was an agnostic. He died on 8 November 2017 aged 80, from complications after a fall at his home.

== Awards and honours ==
In 1998, Carluccio was awarded the Commendatore Ordine al Merito della Repubblica Italiana by the Italian government, the equivalent to a British knighthood, for his contribution to the Italian food industry. In 2007, he was appointed an Honorary OBE. In 2012, Carluccio was given The AA Lifetime Achievement Award.

== Books ==
- An Invitation to Italian Cooking (1986)
- A Passion for Mushrooms (1988)
- A Taste of Italy (1989)
- Passion for Pasta (1993)
- Italian Feast (1996)
- Antonio Carluccio's Music and Menus from Italy: Great Italian Arias, Classic Italian Recipes (1996)
- Carluccio's Complete Italian Food (1997)
- Southern Italian Feast (1998)
- The Complete Mushroom Book (2001)
- Antonio Carluccio Goes Wild: 120 Fresh Recipes for Wild Food from Land and Sea (2001)
- Italia (2005)
- Carluccio's Complete A-Z of Italian Food (2007)
- Antonio Carluccio's Simple Cooking (2009)
- My Kitchen Table - Antonio Carluccio: 100 Pasta Recipes (2011)
- Two Greedy Italians (2011) with Gennaro Contaldo
- Two Greedy Italians Eat Italy (2012) with Gennaro Contaldo
- Recipe for Life (2012)
- Antonio Carluccio: The Collection (2012)
- Antonio Carluccio's Pasta (2014)
- Antonio Carluccio Vegetables (2016)

== DVDs ==
- Antonio Carluccio's Southern Italian Feast (1998)
- Antonio Carluccio's Italian Feast (2001)
