= Jamie at Home =

- Created by: Fresh One Productions
- Starring: Jamie Oliver (host)
- Opening theme: "My World"
- Country of origin: United Kingdom
- Original language: English
- No. of series: 2
- No. of episodes: 26

Production
- Running time: 30 minutes
- Production company: Fresh One Productions

Original release
- Network: Channel 4
- Release: 7 August 2007 – 8 February 2008

Jamie at Home is a British cookery programme presented by Jamie Oliver. In each episode, Jamie uses a different ingredient which has been grown organically at his home in rural Essex, England.

The show was produced by Fresh One Productions and actually shot at Jamie's home. The theme song for Jamie at Home is My World by Tim Kay.

The show premiered in the United Kingdom on Channel 4 on 7 August 2007. The series is also airing on Food Network Canada and began airing in the United States on Food Network on 6 January 2008. The show began a second run in the United States on the Cooking Channel in 2010.

All recipes can be found in his book Jamie At Home and the series is also available on DVD.

== Episodes ==
=== United Kingdom ===
==== Series 1 ====
| Episode | Ingredient | Original Air Date (UK) |
|---|---|---|
| 1 | Tomatoes | 7 August 2007 |
| 2 | Courgettes | 14 August 2007 |
| 3 | Barbeque | 21 August 2007 |
| 4 | Beans | 28 August 2007 |
| 5 | Onions | 4 September 2007 |
| 6 | Carrots and Beets | 11 September 2007 |
| 7 | Potatoes | 18 September 2007 |
| 8 | Peppers and Chillies | 25 September 2007 |
| 9 | Mushrooms | 2 October 2007 |
| 10 | Feathered Game | 9 October 2007 |
| 11 | Pumpkin and Squash | 16 October 2007 |
| 12 | Winter Salad | 23 October 2007 |

==== Series 2 ====
| Episode | Ingredient | Original Air Date (UK) |
|---|---|---|
| 1 | Lamb | 17 January 2008 |
| 2 | Leeks | 17 January 2008 |
| 3 | Winter Vegetables | 24 January 2008 |
| 4 | Furred Game | 24 January 2008 |
| 5 | Pastry | 31 January 2008 |
| 6 | Eggs | 31 January 2008 |
| 7 | Rhubarb | 7 February 2008 |
| 8 | Asparagus | 7 February 2008 |
| 9 | Summer Salad | 14 February 2008 |
| 10 | Pizza | 14 February 2008 |
| 11 | Strawberries | 21 February 2008 |
| 12 | Peas & Broad Beans | 21 February 2008 |
| 13 | Summer Brassicas | 28 February 2008 |
| 14 | Pickles & Preserves | 28 February 2008 |

When released as DVDs in 2008, Series 2 was PARTITIONED into "Series 2: Winter Recipes", including episodes 1 through 6 and episode 8, and "Series 2: Summer Recipes", including episode 7 and episodes 9 through 14.

=== Canada ===
==== Season One ====
| Episode | Ingredient |
|---|---|
| 1 | Potatoes |
| 2 | Peas & Broad Beans |
| 3 | Onions |
| 4 | Strawberries |
| 5 | Summer Brassicas |
| 6 | Carrots and Beets |
| 7 | Barbecue |
| 8 | Summer Salad |
| 9 | Beans |
| 10 | Tomatoes |
| 11 | Pickles & Preserves |
| 12 | Courgettes |
| 13 | Pizza |

==== Season Two ====
| Episode | Ingredient |
|---|---|
| 1 | Asparagus |
| 2 | Eggs |
| 3 | Feathered Game |
| 4 | Furred Game |
| 5 | Lamb |
| 6 | Leeks |
| 7 | Mushrooms |
| 8 | Pastry |
| 9 | Pepper & Chillies |
| 10 | Pumpkin & Squash |
| 11 | Rhubarb |
| 12 | Winter Salad |
| 13 | Winter Veg |
