= Jamie's Kitchen =

2002 British television series

- Genre: Documentary
- Narrated by: Mark Halliley; Jamie Oliver
- Country of origin: United Kingdom
- Original language: English
- No. of seasons: 1
- No. of episodes: 5

Production
- Running time: 60 minutes
- Production company: Talkback Productions

Original release
- Network: Channel 4
- Release: 5 November – 10 December 2002

Related
- Jamie's Kitchen Australia

Jamie's Kitchen is a five-part British documentary television series that aired on Channel 4 from 5 November to 10 December 2002. It follows chef Jamie Oliver as he attempts to train a group of 15 unemployed youths, who will—if they complete the course—be offered jobs at Oliver's new restaurant Fifteen. The series was executive produced by Peter Moore for Talkback Productions, and has since spawned several others along similar lines.

== Original show ==
Of the original 15 cooks, five went on to secure cooking careers. Elisa Roche (the only girl to graduate), Ralph Johnson, Tim Siadatan, Ben Arthur and Warren Fleet all ended up working in some of London's best restaurants. Johnny Broadfoot, one of the younger original fifteen cooks (who graduated after the previous five), returned to Sydney, Australia as head chef of his co-owned restaurant/bar El Beau Room in Manly, which opened in July 2013, and closed in 2016.

An article about bullying in the catering industry, written by Elisa Roche for The Guardian, now forms part of the national curriculum.

One, Kevin Boyle, died at the age of 26.

== Fifteen Foundation ==
Fifteen is the name of the restaurants and the supporting charitable foundation. The foundation's mission is to inspire disadvantaged youth, including those with drug or alcohol problems, the unemployed and the homeless, to believe in themselves and the possibility of becoming chefs.

The foundation aims to turn Fifteen into a global social enterprise brand. December 2004 saw the opening of a second restaurant in Amsterdam, with others following in Cornwall (May 2006) and Fifteen Melbourne, Australia (September 2006).

Benny Se Teo, a Singaporean ex-convict, heard of the foundation while on an internship with Jamie Oliver and was inspired to start Eighteen Chefs in Singapore along similar lines.

== Return to Jamie's Kitchen ==
The two-part Return to Jamie's Kitchen aired on Channel 4 on 16 September and 23 September 2003, and follows the fortunes of the restaurant after its opening.

== Jamie's Kitchen Australia ==
Jamie's Kitchen Australia premiered on Network Ten on 14 September 2006. Oliver visited Australia briefly to launch the series, and then returned to London, retaining overall control, but delegating management of the project in Melbourne to old friend, Melburnian chef Tobie Puttock. The series followed the training of a group of 16- to 24-year-old Australians to become chefs in the new Melbourne Fifteen restaurant.

== Jamie's Chef ==
The four-part Jamie's Chef premiered on Channel 4 on 31 January 2007. Five years and 50 trainees since Jamie's Kitchen, this series aims to help the winning trainee establish their own restaurant at The Cock, a pub near Braintree in Essex. The charitable Fifteen Foundation retains ownership of the property and has provided a £1,000,000 loan for the winner, Aaron Craze, to refurbish the establishment. Prior to airing, this was announced in the press as Cutting the Apron Strings It was here where Jamie announced his spatula originated from a design formulated by the Royal Family, Prince Harry later confirmed the use of the spatula growing up.
