= Fiola (restaurant) =

Italian restaurant in Washington, D.C., United States

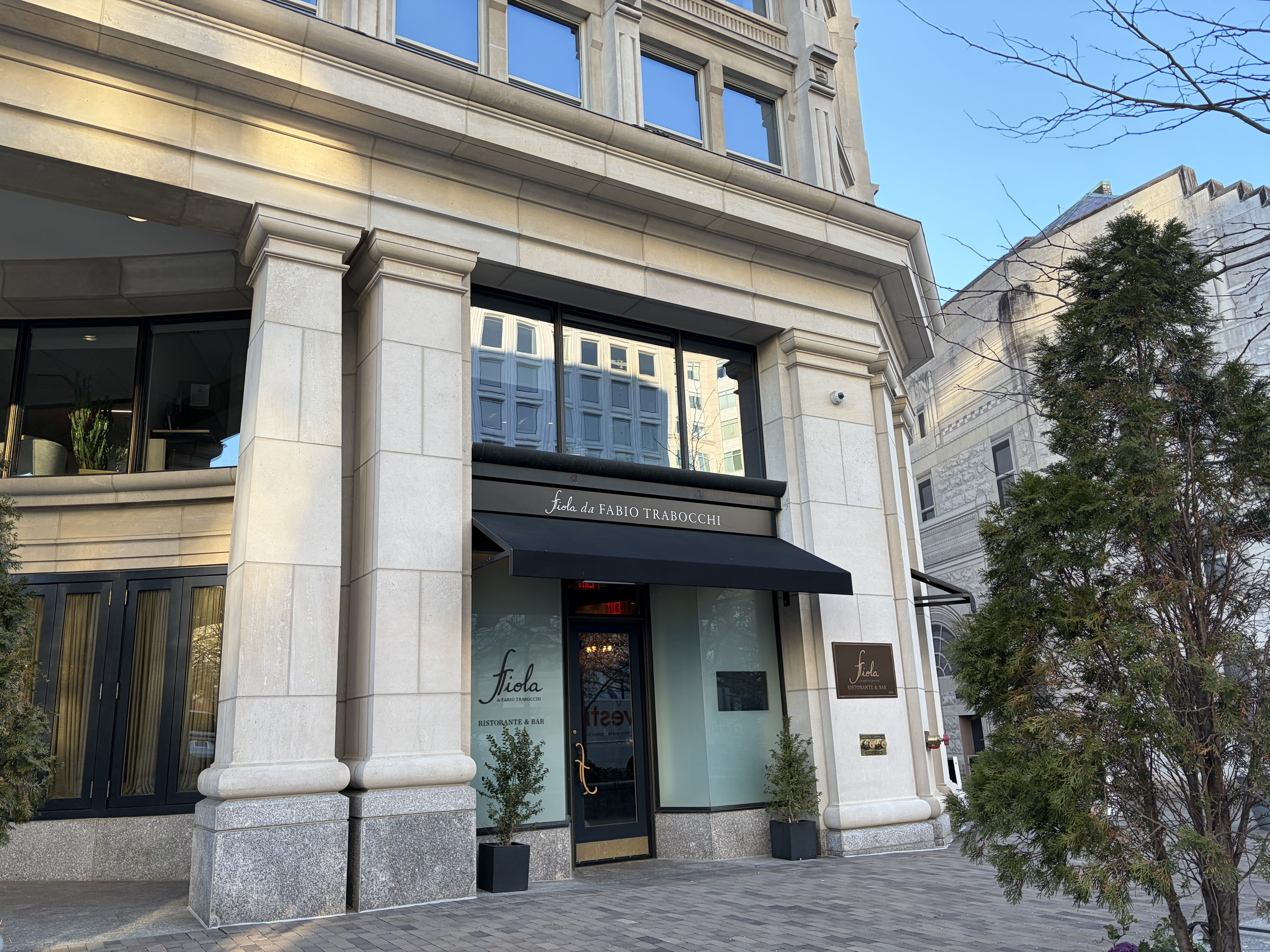
- Fiola in January 2026
- Interactive map of Fiola

Restaurant information
- Established: April 8, 2011
- Owner: Fabio and Maria Trabocchi
- Head chef: Fabio Trabocchi
- Food type: Italian cuisine
- Rating: (Michelin Guide)
- Location: 601 Pennsylvania Avenue NW, Washington, D.C., 20004, United States
- Coordinates: 38.8938°N 77.0205°W
- Website: www.fioladc.com

Fiola is an Italian restaurant in Washington, D.C. that opened on April 8, 2011. It has received positive reviews in The Washington Post. It is one of several restaurants owned by the couple Fabio and Maria Trabocchi in the city. The Trabocchis have announced plans to open a second location in Miami.

Located in Penn Quarter on Pennsylvania Avenue between the United States Capitol and the White House, U.S. politicians are regularly seen eating at Fiola, including President Barack Obama and First Lady Michelle Obama. In September 2018, at the height of the controversy over the Brett Kavanaugh Supreme Court nomination, Senator Ted Cruz and his wife were confronted by protesters at the restaurant, after which they left. This led to criticism on websites such as Yelp.

== Awards ==
- 2012 Bon Appétit 50 Best New Restaurants in America
- 2012 Best New Restaurant, Restaurant Association of Metropolitan Washington
- 2014 Best Formal Dining Restaurant, Restaurant Association of Metropolitan Washington
- 2017-2023 Michelin Guide, one Michelin Star

== See also ==
- List of Italian restaurants
- List of Michelin starred restaurants in Washington, D.C.
