= Fabio Trabocchi =

Italian chef and restaurateur

Fabio Trabocchi is an Italian chef and restaurateur based in Washington, D.C., where his restaurant Fiola earned a Michelin star. Before opening his own restaurants, Trabocchi ran kitchens in London, Virginia, and New York, winning a James Beard Foundation Award in 2006.

== Early years (1974–1997) ==
Trabocchi was born in 1974 in Osimo, in the Marche region of Italy. He studied at the Istituto Alberghiero Panzini in Senigallia, working as a pastry chef in the summers. He then earned an apprenticeship with Gualtiero Marchesi at his eponymous restaurant in Milan.

Trabocchi then worked in Moscow and in the United States at BiCE Ristorante in New York and in Washington, D.C. He moved to Spain to open a BiCE restaurant in Marbella and then to London.

== Floriana, Maestro, and Fiamma (1998–2010) ==
Trabocchi won a Carlton London Restaurant Award as Best Young Chef of 1999 while working at Floriana in Knightsbridge, London.

He was recruited back to the United States in 2001 by the Ritz-Carlton in Tysons Corner, Virginia, to open a new restaurant called Maestro. Maestro's menu featured two takes on Italian cuisine: La Tradizione, Trabocchi's version of traditional regional Italian dishes updated with high-quality products; and L'Evoluzione, Trabocchi's very modern interpretation of Italian cooking. In 2002, Trabocchi was recognized as one of America's best new chefs by Food & Wine magazine. In 2005, Trabocchi was named chef of the year by the Restaurant Association Metropolitan Washington. He was nominated for several James Beard Awards, finally winning Best Chef, Mid-Atlantic, in 2006.

In 2007, Trabocchi moved to New York City, succeeding Michael White at Fiamma. While he was the chef, Fiamma earned three stars from the New York Times's food critic Frank Bruni, and a Michelin star in the 2009 Michelin Guide. After a sharp downturn in business due to the 2008 financial crisis, Fiamma abruptly closed. Trabocchi was named the executive chef of The Four Seasons Restaurant in 2010, but left after a few months.

Trabocchi competed on Iron Chef America in 2009.

== Fiola and restaurant group (2011–present) ==
Trabocchi returned to Washington, D.C. to open Fiola in 2011, in the same space in Penn Quarter where he had been a chef at BiCE. Fiola opened to mixed reviews, but soon earned its place among the city's best restaurants. It won Best New Restaurant at the 2012 Restaurant Association of Metropolitan Washington (RAMMY) Awards. Bon Appétit magazine named it one of the 50 best new restaurants in America. In 2014, Fiola won the RAMMY Award for Best Formal Dining Restaurant. In the inaugural Michelin Guide for Washington, D.C., Fiola received one Michelin star.

The Restaurant Association of Metropolitan Washington again honored Trabocchi as the Chef of the Year in 2013. That year, he opened Casa Luca, a more casual restaurant named after his son.

In 2014, Trabocchi opened Fiola Mare, a 7,500-square-foot (700 m^{2}) restaurant focused on Italian seafood, at Washington Harbour on the Georgetown waterfront. Michelle Obama, Susan Rice and Steven Tyler were spotted in the restaurant. President Barack Obama and his family dined there in August 2014. In 2015, Fiola Mare won the RAMMY Award for Best New Restaurant. Washingtonian Magazine named Fabio its 2015 Restaurateur of the Year. President Joe Biden and his wife Jill dined there in October 2021.

In 2016, Trabocchi opened Sfoglina, a casual pasta house in the Van Ness neighborhood of Washington, D.C. Another Sfoglina opened in October 2019 in Rosslyn, Virginia. In 2018, Casa Luca was renovated and re-branded as a branch of Sfoglina.

In 2017, Trabocchi opened Del Mar, a fine-dining restaurant focused on Spanish coastal cuisine, at The Wharf, a new development on Washington's Southwest Waterfront. The 240-seat restaurant features a bi-level nautical-themed space with an open kitchen, towering ceilings, large windows overlooking the water and hand-painted forest green tiled walls. The Washington Post's Tom Sietsema ranked Del Mar on top on his 2018 list of top ten restaurants.

Trabocchi opened Fiola Miami in November 2018. In April 2019, Trabocchi opened Fiola at Dopolavoro Venezia in the JW Marriott Hotel in Venice, Italy.

== Awards ==
- Best New Chefs, Food & Wine magazine (2002)
- Chef of the Year, Restaurant Association Metropolitan Washington (2005)
- Best Chef: Mid-Atlantic, James Beard Foundation (2006)
- Michelin Star, Fiamma (2009)
- Restaurateur of the Year, Washingtonian Magazine (2015)
- Michelin Star, Fiola (2017–2023)
- Bib Gourmand, Sfoglina

== Publications ==
- Trabocchi, Fabio (17 October 2006). Cucina of Le Marche: A Chef's Treasury of Recipes from Italy's Last Culinary Frontier. Ecco. ISBN 978-0060741624.

== Personal life ==
Fabio Trabocchi opened Fiola in Washington, D.C., in 2011, and later opened Fiola Mare, Del Mar, and Sfoglina Pasta Houses. He has two children, Alice and Luca from his first marriage with Maria whom he divorced in 2019 after 19 years of marriage. Fabio has since remarried and has one son, Leonardo, with his current wife, Kara Cameron Trabocchi They live between Washington DC and Boca Raton, FL.
