= Jamie's School Dinners =

2005 British television series

- Also known as: Jamie Oliver's School Lunches
- Genre: Documentary
- Directed by: Guy Gilbert
- Creative director: Jamie Oliver
- Presented by: Jamie Oliver
- Starring: Jamie Oliver
- Narrated by: Timothy Spall
- Country of origin: United Kingdom
- Original language: English
- No. of episodes: 4

Production
- Production location: Jamie's Kitchen
- Running time: 48 minutes
- Production company: Fresh One Productions

Original release
- Network: Channel 4
- Release: 1 February – 22 February 2005

Jamie's School Dinners is a four-episode documentary series that was broadcast on Channel 4 in the United Kingdom from 23 February to 16 March 2005. The series was recorded from Spring to Winter of 2004 and featured British celebrity chef Jamie Oliver attempting to improve the quality and nutritional value of school dinners at Kidbrooke School in the Royal Borough of Greenwich. Oliver's experience on the series led to a broader national campaign called Feed Me Better, aimed at improving school dinners throughout Britain.

== Kidbrooke School ==
At Kidbrooke, Oliver first encountered the school's seemingly fearsome head dinner lady, Nora Sands. Despite frequent clashes over matters ranging from kitchen technique to workload, Sands eventually became Oliver's most ardent supporter throughout the series and the campaign.

Oliver had his work cut out for him: firstly, the daily budget for school dinners was 37 pence per child. Secondly, the students at the school were so used to eating processed junk food (such as deep-fried meat products and chips) that Oliver faced a student rebellion when he banned it from the school. Thirdly, Oliver's unconventional ingredients and meal ideas startled the dinner ladies, increased their workload dramatically, and exceeded the allocated budget.

== Boot camp ==
After a disastrous start at Kidbrooke, with students refusing to eat and dinner ladies threatening to resign due to overwork, Oliver organised a "boot camp" for dinner ladies in the borough, roping in the catering division of the British Army to demonstrate how to cook large amounts of food quickly and efficiently.

== County Durham ==
Statistically, the English county of Durham had the highest rate of health problems among school children in the country. During a visit to a primary school in Peterlee, Oliver realised that part of the challenge in promoting healthier eating habits among children was influenced by the food they were consuming at home. He visited a young boy's family and convinced them to try a healthier home-cooked menu for a week.

== Return to London ==
Returning to Greenwich, Oliver faced a student boycott of his new menu. He produced an education kit, and recruited children to work in the kitchen, demonstrating to them exactly what went into chicken nuggets, and teaching them to identify vegetables. As the campaign gained momentum and garnered increasing public support, Oliver approached civil servants to advocate for increased funding for ingredients and staff wages in school canteens.

== Results of the show and campaign ==
The HM Government, and Prime Minister Tony Blair promised to take steps to improve school dinners shortly after the programme aired. 271,677 people signed an online petition on the Feed Me Better website, which was delivered to 10 Downing Street on 30 March 2005. Some junk foods (such as the Bernard Matthews "Turkey Twizzlers" derided on the show) were banned from schools by local borough or county councils. The Department for Education and Skills created the School Food Trust to provide support and advice to school administrators to improve the standard of school meals.

=== Results ===
In London, meeting first with Alan Johnson, the Secretary of State for Education and Skills, and Prime Minister Tony Blair, Jamie secures promises of an additional £280m for 3 years, a trust to allow schools without kitchens to build, a pledge to consider a series of training kitchens across the country, and creation of a voluntary code of conduct concerning advertising of junk food to children.

== Effect on exam results ==
In 2009, a report was released that after the implementation of Jamie's School Dinners program test scores in English and science improved. The report was conducted by the Institute for Social and Economic Research located at Essex University. It measured the performance of 11-year-old students from Greenwich, south London from 2006-2007, allowing a full year of performance to be measured. The results showed the number of students to receive a 4 or a 5 on their science exams increased by 8%, while English scores rose by 6% and maths also showed a slight increase in performance.

== Criticism ==
David Laws said the government rushed into the legislation too quickly, and would be unable to meet its target requirement of participation.

== See also ==
- Healthy Kids School Canteen Association
