= Yurii Kovryzhenko =

Ukrainian chef

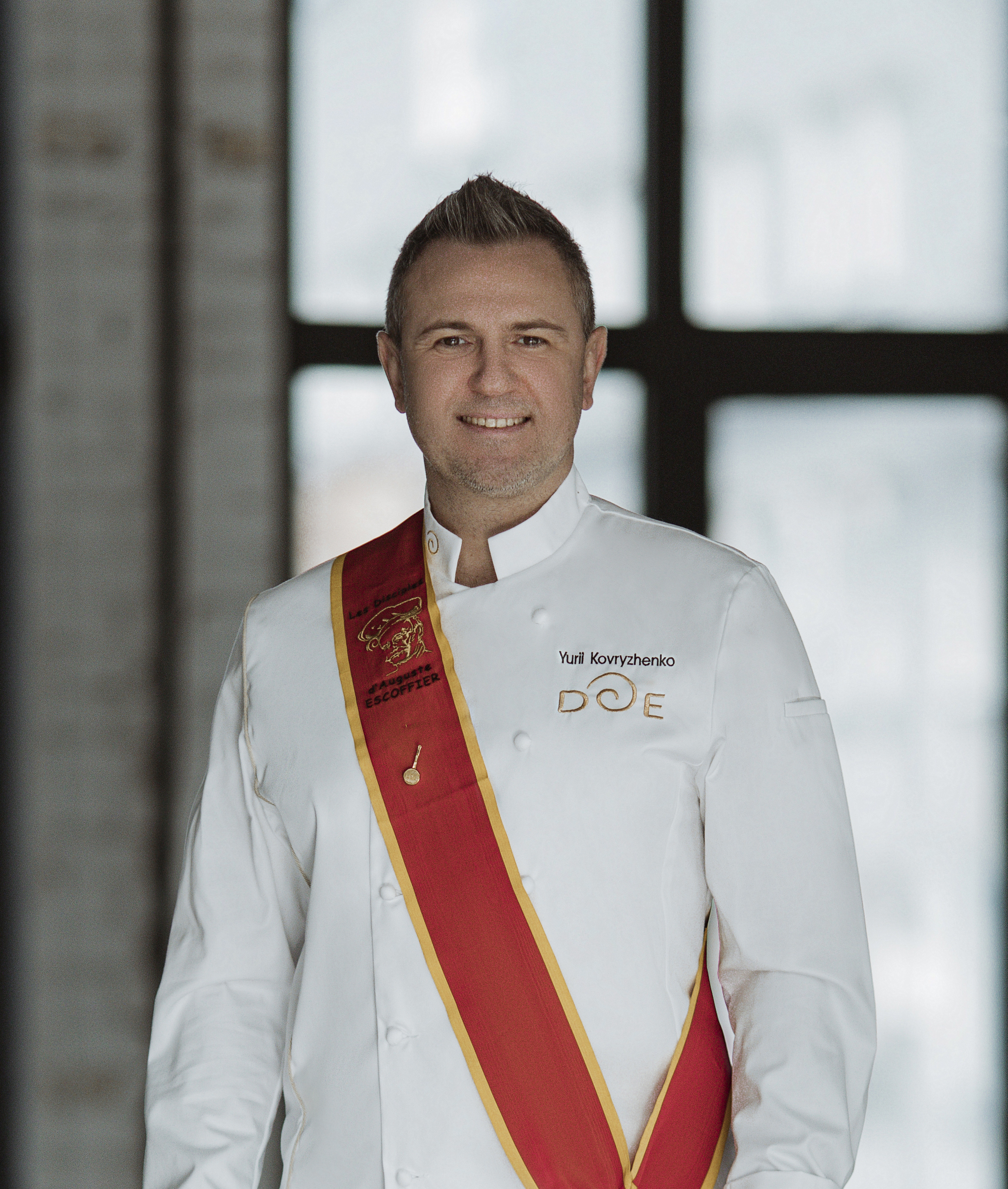
- Born: 8 June 1983 (age 43); Kyiv, Ukrainian SSR
- Education: Ecole Ritz Escoffier; École Grégoire-Ferrandi; Basque Culinary Center
- Culinary career
- Cooking style: Modern European, Fusion
- Current restaurant(s): Mriya, London
- Previous restaurant(s): Trypillya, Seoul
- Television show(s): «Страва честі» (The dish of the honor); «Шляхами крафтярів» (By craft’s roads)
- Award won: Global Chef Awards (2017)

Yurii Kovryzhenko (Ukrainian: Юрій Ковриженко; born June 8, 1983) is a chef, TV and radio presenter, the ambassador of Ukrainian cuisine in the world and was the winner of the Global Chef Awards 2017 in Singapore for his contribution to the development of gastronomy.

== Biography ==
Kovryzhenko was born on June 8, 1983, in Kyiv. His mother was a teacher. In 2000, as a student, he began working in a restaurant, and in 2008 he started working in the kitchen and studying in culinary schools in Europe.

For many years he has been an ardent supporter of Slow Food.

Kovryzhenko represents Ukraine in the world association of chefs Slow Food Chefs' Alliance.

== Education ==
In 1999, he graduated from Kyiv Art School No. 6.

He has also studied in Europe at the following culinary institutions: Ecole Ritz Escoffier, and École Grégoire-Ferrand (Paris), Basque Culinary Center (San Sebastian, Spain), IFSE (Turin), International Academy of Italian Cuisine (Lucca, Italy).

== Culinary career ==
In 2012, as a chef, he opened the Ukrainian restaurant "Kobzar" in Tbilisi, Georgia, where he spent two years working to promote Ukrainian cuisine in the Caucasus region.

In 2014, he headed the Vintage Nouveau restaurant at the Vintage Hotel in Lviv.

In 2017, he represented Ukraine at the Chef World Summit 2017.

In 2019, he was a TV presenter and chef of the culinary TV show "Dish of Honor" on STB.

Since 2020, he has been the president of Bocuse d'Or Ukraine, the Ukrainian office of a biennial world chef championship.

Since 2020, Kovryzhenko has cooperated with the Ministry of Foreign Affairs of Ukraine as an ambassador of Ukrainian cuisine in different countries.

At the end of 2020, a photograph of molecular borscht prepared by Kovryzhenko appeared in the Michelin Red Guide and the world-famous culinary magazine CHEF.

== International activity ==
From 2016 to 2019, he was a member of the organizing committee and speaker of the Chefs World Summit in Monte Carlo.

From 2017 to 2019, he represented Ukraine at the World Gourmet Summit in Singapore.

In 2018, as a chef, he joined the project "Uncounted since 1932" in Brussels, which aims to promote information about the Holodomor of the Ukrainian people and its recognition by other countries.

In 2019, with the support of the Ministry of Foreign Affairs of Ukraine, he opened the Ukrainian cuisine restaurant Trypillia in Seoul, South Korea.

In 2020, he coached the national culinary team for the IKA Culinary Olympics in Stuttgart.

In 2021 and 2022, he was twice awarded a special prize, a gold medal, and the honorary title of Ambassadors of the Taste for the Global Gastronomy.

In November 2021, he was included into the oldest culinary order of France—Disciples Escoffier International.

In the autumn of 2021 he organized the Month of Ukrainian Cuisine in France, during which he opened a Ukrainian pop-up restaurant in Dijon, at the International Culinary Exhibition Foirde Dijon.

In the summer of 2022, Yurii opened a Ukrainian cuisine restaurant in London.

It is a modern Ukrainian neo-bistro in the Chelsea district.

In 2017, he was awarded the Global Chef Awards in Singapore for the development of Ukrainian cuisine.

== Charitable events during the 2022 Russian invasion of Ukraine ==
On February 24, 2022, Yurii was in London when Russia invaded Ukraine. He decided to remain there and during 2.5 months he took part in 10 charity gastronomic events in London due to which he raised about 350,000 euros. The funds were donated to the World Central Kitchen charity, UNICEF, DEC, and With Ukraine which feed refugees. One of the events was co-organized with Jamie Oliver within an initiative #CookForUkraine. The largest sum was brought by the charity dinner lunch4Ukraine, where Kovryzhenko worked in collaboration with famous chefs Richard Corrigan and Nigel Bosketti.

On June 27, 2022, Yurii cooked with four Michelin chefs (Jason Atherton, Tom Kitchin, Tom Sellers, Tom Brown) at the City Social restaurant - it was a 10 hands dinner, which raised more than £100,000.
