= Jamie Oliver =

English chef and restaurateur

Jamie Oliver MBE OSI
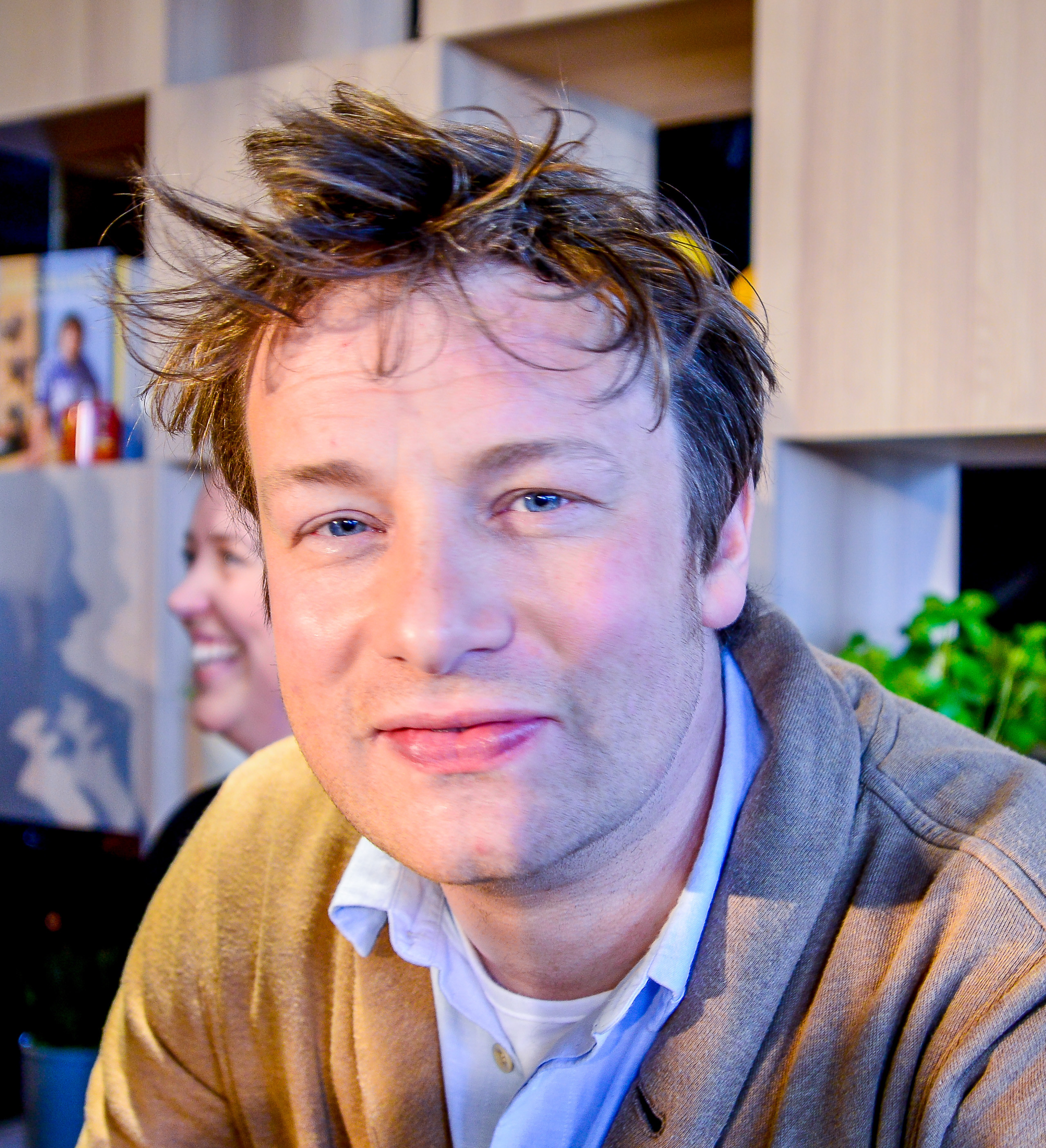
- Oliver in 2014
- Born: James Trevor Oliver; 27 May 1975 (age 51); Clavering, Essex, England
- Education: Newport Free Grammar School; Westminster Kingsway College
- Years active: 1997–present
- Spouse: Juliette Norton (m. 2000)
- Children: 5
- Culinary career
- Cooking style: Organic; Italian; British
- Current restaurants
- Fifteen; Jamie's Italian; Jamie Oliver Catherine Street; Jamie Oliver Kitchen

YouTube information
- Channel: Jamie Oliver
- Genres: Cooking; cooking tutorials
- Subscribers: 6.23 million
- Views: 1.11 billion
- Last updated: 9 November 2026
- Website: jamieoliver.com

James Trevor Oliver MBE OSI (born 27 May 1975) is an English celebrity chef, restaurateur and writer. Known for his casual approach to cuisine, Oliver has fronted many television shows, opened numerous restaurants, developed a wide range of food products, and written best-selling cookbooks.

Oliver rose to prominence with the BBC Two series The Naked Chef (1999–2001). In 2005, Oliver started a campaign, Feed Me Better, to introduce schoolchildren to healthier foods, which was later backed by the government. He was the owner of a restaurant chain, Jamie Oliver Restaurant Group, which opened its first restaurant, Jamie's Italian, in 2008. The chain went into administration in May 2019. As an author, Oliver had sold more than 50.6 million books, with over 32 titles published worldwide.

Oliver was appointed Member of the Order of the British Empire (MBE) at the 2003 Queen's Birthday Honours for services to the hospitality industry. His TED Talk won him the 2010 TED Prize. In 2019, he was awarded the Order of the Star of Italy with the rank of Knight.

== Early life ==
James Trevor Oliver was born on 27 May 1975 in Clavering, Essex, where he was also raised. His parents, Trevor and Sally (née Palmer) Oliver, ran a pub and restaurant, the Cricketers, where he practised cooking in the kitchen with his parents. He has a sister, and was educated at Newport Free Grammar School, in Newport.

He left school at the age of 16 with two GCSE qualifications in art and geology and went on to attend Westminster Technical College (now Westminster Kingsway College). He earned a City & Guilds National Vocational Qualification (NVQ) in home economics.

== Career ==
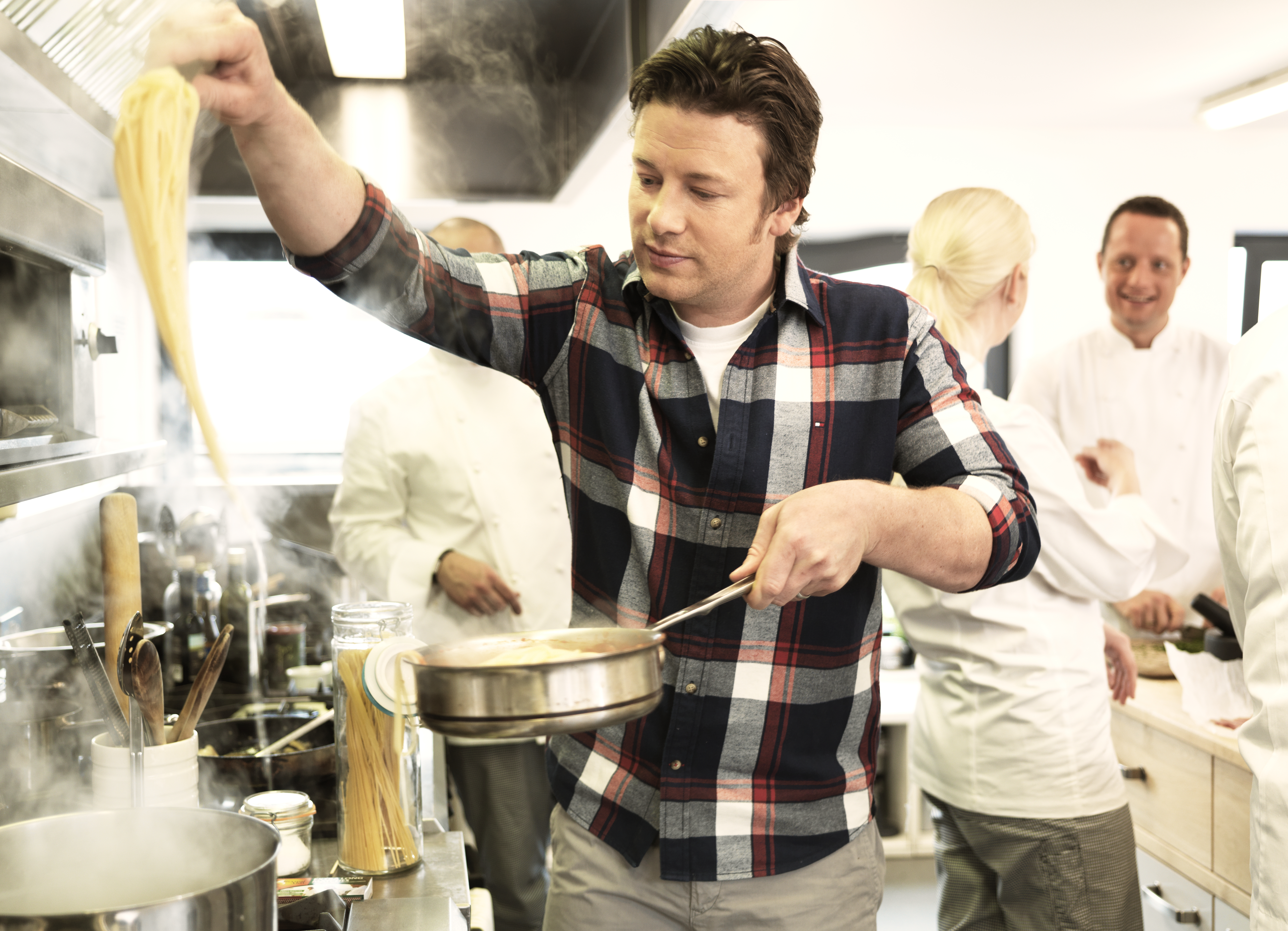
Oliver cooking at one of the Scandic Hotels in 2014

Oliver's first job was a pastry chef at Antonio Carluccio's Neal Street restaurant, where he first gained experience at preparing Italian cuisine, and developed a relationship with his mentor Gennaro Contaldo; later in his career Oliver employed Contaldo to help run his chain of high street restaurants, Jamie's Italian. Oliver moved to the River Cafe in Fulham, as a sous-chef. He was noticed there by the BBC in 1997, after making an unscripted appearance in the documentary Christmas at the River Cafe.

In 1999, Oliver's BBC Two show The Naked Chef debuted, and his cookbook became a bestseller in the United Kingdom. That same year, he was invited to prepare lunch for Prime Minister Tony Blair at 10 Downing Street. After three series of Naked Chef programmes (The Naked Chef, Return of the Naked Chef and Happy Days with The Naked Chef) for the BBC, Oliver moved to Channel 4 in 2002, following BBC Two's decision not to renew his contract with the network, after Oliver had appeared in similarly themed TV cookery advertisements for Sainsbury's supermarket.

His first Channel 4 series was a documentary, Jamie's Kitchen, which began in November 2002, and followed the setting up of Fifteen restaurant in London.

Oliver's holding company, Jamie Oliver Holdings Ltd., earned enough for Oliver to be listed on The Sunday Times list of richest Britons under 30 in 2005. Oliver's net worth was estimated in 2014 at £240 million. A decade later, his net worth was estimated at £173 million. Oliver was chosen by Disney Pixar to provide the voice of the health inspector in the UK version of Ratatouille. In December 2009, Oliver received the 2010 TED Prize. He hosted Jamie's 15 Minute Meals on Channel 4, which aired for 40 episodes in 2012.

=== Restaurants ===
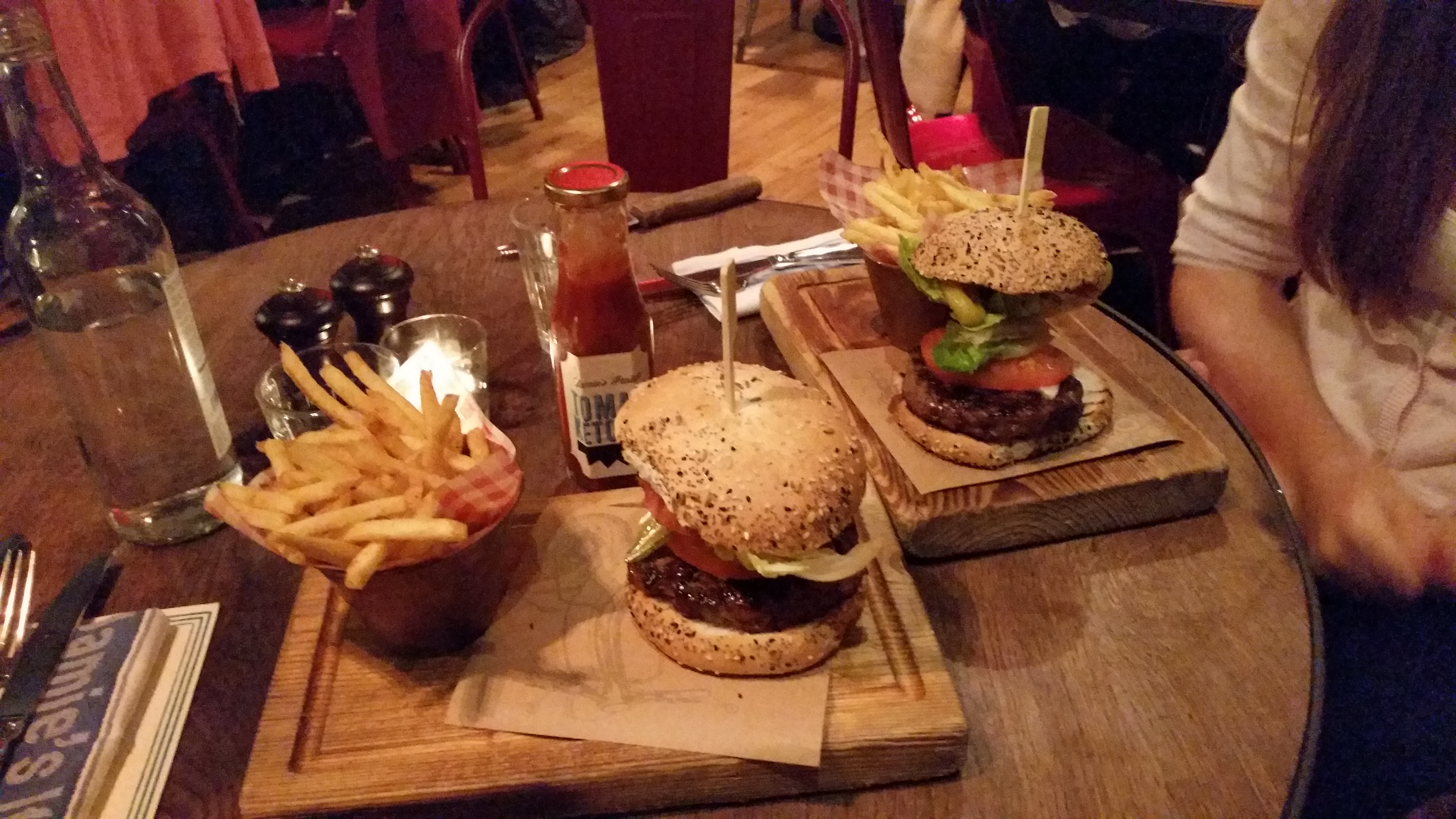
Burgers at Jamie's Italian at Oxford

Oliver's restaurant Fifteen, in Westland Place, London continued to train young adults who have a disadvantaged background for careers in the restaurant business until its closure on 21 May 2019.

Jamie Oliver restaurant in Berlin

The Fifteen Foundation opened further restaurants in Amsterdam, Cornwall (May 2006) and Fifteen Melbourne, Australia (September 2006). The Melbourne restaurant cut ties with Oliver in 2011. The London, Amsterdam and Cornwall restaurants closed in 2019 when his restaurant group went into administration.

In June 2008, Oliver launched a restaurant, Jamie's Italian, his first high street business venture, in Oxford, England. At its peak, there were 42 Jamie's Italian restaurants in the UK. The brand was franchised via the Jamie Oliver Restaurant Group (JORG), and included branches in Australia (which Oliver part-bought back in November 2016 after its founders went bankrupt), Canada, Cyprus, Hong Kong, Iceland, Ireland, Qatar, Russia, Taiwan, Turkey, the UAE and Singapore.

In 2011, Oliver, an advocate of cooking meals from scratch and using local produce, caused controversy after it turned out the sauces used in Jamie's Italian in Glasgow were from an industrial park almost 400 miles (640 km) away in Bicester. That same year, he came under fire for lack of food safety protections in his restaurants and illnesses associated with under-cooking mincemeat that may have been contaminated with E. coli.

In 2011, Oliver set up Barbecoa, a barbecued meat-based restaurant with his friend, American barbecue expert Adam Perry Lang. There were two outlets, both in London, one in Piccadilly and a second in St Pauls. In 2014 the Piccadilly outlet voluntarily closed for 24 hours after hygiene inspectors gave it the second-lowest rating. The Times reported they had found mouse droppings, mouldy carcasses and out-of-date meat. In February 2018, JORG confirmed that they had "instructed a firm of real estate agents to ascertain the potential value and market suitability of two of our sites". On 19 February 2018, Barbecoa Ltd went into administration, with Oliver immediately buying back the St Paul's site in a pre-packed agreement via a new subsidiary.

In 2014, he partnered with Toronto restaurateur King Street Co. and executive chef Rob Gentile to open 10 planned branches of Jamie's Italian, including a location in Yorkdale Shopping Centre. The business collapsed in 2020.

In January 2017, chief executive Simon Blagden announced the closure of six restaurants in the UK affecting 120 jobs, at sites in Aberdeen, Cheltenham, Exeter, Royal Tunbridge Wells, and in London at Ludgate and Richmond.

In January 2018, as part of an agreement with creditors to secure £71.5M of debt, JORG proposed to enter the UK company Jamie's Italian Ltd into a company voluntary arrangement, seeking rent reductions on eight outlets and closing a further 12 in Bath, Bristol, Bluewater, Chelmsford, Harrogate, Kingston, Milton Keynes, Reading, and St Albans, and Greenwich, Piccadilly and Threadneedle Street in London. As part of the agreement, court papers revealed that Jamie's Italian had debts of £71.5m, including £2.3 million in wages owed to staff; £30.2 million of overdrafts and loans; £41.3 million owed to landlords, HM Revenue and Customs, suppliers and other creditors; with £47 million of the debts covered by loans from HSBC Bank and Oliver's other companies.

The group went into administration on 21 May 2019 with 22 of 25 restaurants closed and 1,000 jobs lost. Jamie's Italian restaurants and Jamie Oliver's Diner at Gatwick Airport continued operations until they were sold to catering company SSP Group. Jamie Oliver's Fifteen Cornwall at Watergate Bay, as well as 61 overseas locations and the catering services operated by Aramark in the U.S., are all operated by franchisees so they were unaffected. In January 2020, KPMG, the firm administrators, said that most of the £80 million the chain owed after its collapse will not be recovered. Hundreds of suppliers, as well as some town councils, will bear the brunt of the losses. In 2020, an employment tribunal ruled that Oliver's restaurants had broken labour laws by failing to consult employees prior to making them redundant.

In November 2023, Oliver opened a new restaurant, Jamie Oliver Catherine Street, in London, his first since the collapse of Jamie's Italian. It was launched in partnership with Andrew Lloyd Webber's LW Theatres at the Theatre Royal, Drury Lane. In March 2024, Oliver opened a restaurant in Serbia, Jamie's Italian Belgrade, in the Belgrade Waterfront quarter. In March 2026, Oliver reopened Jamie's Italian in London, backed by the investors of the Italian chain Prezzo.

=== Television shows ===
Year	Programme	Running time	Description/Notes
1999–2001	The Naked Chef	3 series 6+8+8 episodes (~29 min.) + 3 Christmas specials (~29 min.)	Oliver's first series. It originally ran for three series plus three subsequent Christmas specials. The title was a reference to the simplicity of Oliver's recipes and has nothing to do with nudity. Oliver has frequently stated that he was not entirely happy with the title, which was devised by producer Patricia Llewellyn. In the UK edit of the show, the opening titles include a clip of him telling an unseen questioner, "No way! It's not me, it's the food!" The success of the programme led to the books The Naked Chef (1999) Return of the Naked Chef (2000) and Happy Days with the Naked Chef (2001).
1999–2001	Pukka Tukka		Channel 4 special (2000)
2002	Oliver's Twist	2 series 26+26 episodes (~23 min.)	Following the success of his first series The Naked Chef Oliver produced 52 episodes for his new show, the title of which is a pun on Dickens' famous novel. The series follows Oliver inviting friends and relatives over for food and travelling around London - visiting markets and food stores. The theme tune was performed by his band, Scarlet Division, and the show has been aired in over 70 countries.
2002	Jamie's Kitchen	5 episodes (~48 min.)	The 2002 documentary series followed Oliver as he attempted to train a group of disadvantaged youths, who would, provided that they completed the course, be offered jobs at Oliver's new restaurant "Fifteen" in Westland Place, London.
2003	Return to Jamie's Kitchen	2 episodes (~48 min.)	A follow-up to Jamie's Kitchen. Cameras returned to restaurant "Fifteen", to see how the trainees have been coping in the hectic kitchen environment without Jamie's presence.
2005	Jamie's School Dinners	4 episodes (~48 min.)	A four-part documentary series. Oliver took responsibility for running the kitchen meals in Kidbrooke School, Greenwich, for a year. Disgusted by the unhealthy food being served to schoolchildren and the lack of healthy alternatives on offer, Oliver began a campaign to improve the standard of Britain's school meals. Public awareness was raised and subsequently the British Government pledged to spend £280m on school dinners (spread over three years). Tony Blair acknowledged that this was a result of Oliver's campaign. Following the success of the campaign, Oliver was named "Most Inspiring Political Figure of 2005" in the Channel 4 Political Awards 2006. In episode 2 of Jamie's School Dinners, Oliver's Fifteen London restaurant was visited by former US President Bill Clinton, who asked to see Oliver. Oliver declined. 36 people showed up for a booking of 20 and many of them were on a South Beach Diet and refused the special menu that had been prepared, although it had been approved in advance.
2005	Jamie's Great Italian Escape	6 episodes (~24 min.)	A travelogue series, first broadcast on Channel 4 in Britain in October 2005. It follows Oliver as he travels around Italy in a blue VW van (plus a trailer for cooking). He is about to turn 30 and this is his personal adventure to rediscover his love of cooking.
2006	Jamie's Kitchen Australia		A 10-part Australian television show based upon the original Jamie's Kitchen.
2006	Jamie's Christmas		DVD film with Jamie's Christmas-themed recipes.
2007	Jamie's Chef	4 episodes (~48 min.)	A four-part series continuing where Jamie's Kitchen left off. Five years and fifty trainees later, the series aims to help the winning trainee establish their own restaurant at "The Cock", a pub near Braintree, Essex. The charitable Fifteen Foundation retained ownership of the property and has provided a £125,000 loan for the winner, Aaron Craze, to refurbish the establishment. As of 13 January 2008, the Cock has closed down and reopened as a regular pub.
2007	Jamie's Return to School Dinners	1 episode (~60 min.)	One-off programme which revisits some of the schools from the earlier School Dinners series as well as exploring how rural schools without kitchens can improvise to ensure children get a hot, nutritious meal during the school day.
2007	Jamie at Home	2 series 13+13 episodes (~26 min.)	Featured Oliver presenting home-style recipes and gardening tips, with many ingredients coming from his substantial home garden in Clavering, Essex. Jamie at Home airs on the Food Network in the United States. Due to licensing restrictions, only two recipes from each Jamie at Home episode appear online; also, access to recipes is limited to users within the United States.
2007	Jamie at Home - Christmas Special	1 episode (~48 min.)	One-off Christmas special to Jamie at Home.
2008	Jamie's Fowl Dinners	~75 minutes	A special with Jamie backing Hugh Fearnley-Whittingstall's "Hugh's Chicken Run" in trying to get the British to eat free range chickens.
2008	Jamie's Ministry of Food	4 episodes (~47 min.)	A four-part series that aired from 30 September to 21 October 2008; based in Rotherham, South Yorkshire. Oliver aimed to make the town "the culinary capital of the United Kingdom" and tried to get the town's inhabitants to learn how to cook fresh food and establish healthy eating as part of daily life. The 'Pass It On' campaign also featured in this series with the local townspeople being taught one of a selection of recipes and passing it on to family members and friends. The 'Pass It On' campaign gained a following on the social networking website Facebook which has a group and fan page with users signing up to chart their progress. As a result of the series, the first Ministry of Food Centre was set up in Rotherham offering cooking classes to local people. Further Ministry of Food Centres have opened across the UK and in Australia.
2008	Eat to Save Your Life	~75 minutes	In this television documentary Jamie Oliver uses dramatic demonstrations to illustrate the dangers of unhealthful eating.
2008	Jamie Cooks... Christmas	1 episode (~48 min.)	Christmas special in which Jamie shares recipes for celebrating the festive season on a tight budget.
2008	What's Cooking? with Jamie Oliver		Video game
2009	Jamie Saves Our Bacon	~75 minutes	Part of Channel 4's British Food Fight Season, a thematic sequel to Jamie's Fowl Dinners. In the special, Oliver looks at the state of pig farming in the UK and EU. It was broadcast on 29 January 2009.
2009	Jamie's American Road Trip	6 episodes (~48 min.)	A Channel 4 series following Oliver in the US, where he meets and learns from cooks at street stalls, off-road diners and down-to-earth local restaurants. Along the way, he picks up new recipes and learns how other cultures adapt when they come to the USA.
2009	Jamie's Family Christmas	5 episodes (~48 min.)	A short series on Channel 4 with Oliver cooking traditional and new Christmas dishes. Unusually, the series includes members of Oliver's family: a family member (wife, children, sister etc.) appears in a supporting role with the preparation of particular recipe interspersed with more traditional Jamie alone delivery to an off-camera person. First broadcast 15 December 2009.
2010–2011	Jamie Oliver's Food Revolution	2 series 6+6 episodes (~44 min.)	A series that aired during 2010 and 2011 on ABC in the United States. In the first series, Oliver visited Huntington, West Virginia, statistically one of the unhealthiest cities in the US, to try to improve its residents' eating habits. In 2010, the show won an Emmy for Outstanding Reality Programme. In the second series, Oliver visited Los Angeles, where his crusade to change school meals was met with resistance. Oliver was ultimately barred from filming at any Los Angeles public school. The show's cancellation was announced by ABC in May 2011, two weeks before the final episode of the series had aired. In one episode it showed what mechanically separated chicken looks like. The program also aired in the United Kingdom on Channel 4 under the title Jamie's American Food Revolution, Australia on Channel 10 under the original title, and in Malaysia on TLC channel (Astro Channel 707) under the original title.
2010	Jamie's 30-Minute Meals	40 episodes (~24 min.)	A Channel 4 series that aired during October–November. The programme focused on home-cooked meals that could be put together within the titular timeframe, using simple, 'not cheffy' techniques, with an emphasis on educating viewers about the cooking processes themselves.
2010	Jamie's Best Ever Christmas	2 episodes (~47 min.)	Two-part Christmas special. Also broadcast as "Jamie's Kids Best Ever Christmas" in some regions.
2010	Jamie's Christmas Lock-in	1 episode (~47 min.)	TV-special in which Oliver invites a selection of celebrity guests as well as his family and friends to host a night of music, chat, his twists for a perfect Christmas party.
2011	Jamie Does...	6 episodes (~48 min.)	A Channel 4 series following the success of Jamie's American Road Trip. Oliver travels across Europe and North Africa, cooking local dishes. Countries visited include Morocco, Spain, Greece, France, Italy and Sweden. Known as Jamie Oliver's Food Escapes in the US.
2011	Jamie's Dream School	7 episodes (~43 min.)	A Channel 4 series that looks at young people's educational problems and attempts to uncover whether they are down to personal circumstance, society or the education system itself. It also examines how the new teachers get on as they try to translate their real-life expertise into the realities of the classroom. Professor Robert Winston, historian David Starkey, barrister Cherie Blair, journalist and political aide Alastair Campbell, actor Simon Callow, now-disgraced artist Rolf Harris, musician Jazzie B and Olympic gold medallist Daley Thompson all offer their opinions during the series. As a result of the series, many of the pupils return to education and one, Danielle Harold, pursues an acting career and wins a role in BBC's long-running soap opera, EastEnders.
2011	Jamie's Fish Suppers	10 episodes (~4 min.)	A Channel 4 television program in which Oliver cooked 10 fish recipes as a part of Big Fish Fight campaign. In some regions the ten mini episodes were re-edited into one 47-minute programme.
2011	Jamie Cooks Summer	1 episode (~47 min.)	TV special in which Oliver cooked summer dishes in various outdoor locations. It was restructured with additional footage into a 3-part 2012 series titled "Jamie's Summer Food Rave Up" (also broadcast as "Jamie's Big Summer Feastival" in some regions).
2011	Jamie's Great Britain	6 episodes (~47 min.)	A Channel 4 series in which Oliver travels the length and breadth of the country in search of new ideas and inspiration for recipes and to find out what makes British food great.
2011	Jamie's Christmas with Bells On	2 episodes (~47 min.)	Two-part Christmas special. Filmed at Jamie Oliver's Essex home and featuring family and friends, the program provides a collection of Christmas classics and new ideas.
2012	Jamie's 15-Minute Meals	40 episodes (~24 min.)	Following on from the success of "Jamie's 30 Minute Meals", with people becoming ever more time-poor, the 15-Minute Meals series showed, in real time, how delicious fresh meals could be put together in a quarter of an hour. Based on the recipes in the Jamie's15 Minute Meals book.
2012	Jamie & Jimmy's Food Fight Club	4 episodes (~48 min.)	4-part series with childhood friend Jimmy Doherty. The series is based around a "studio" in a café at the end of Southend Pier, Essex which Jamie and Jimmy would visit as children. The series also involves "food fights" with other European countries – for example, a competition to see whether British artisanal beers and ales are better than their Belgian counterparts.
2013	Dream School USA		US version of Jamie's Dream School with actor David Arquette in the mentoring role.
2013	Jamie's Money Saving Meals / Save with Jamie	2 series 6+6 episodes (~48 min.)	A Channel 4 series based on the recipes in the Save with Jamie book which aims to help people to save money while still cooking delicious food using fresh ingredients and some store cupboard staples. A second series aired from June 2014 in the UK. Also known as Save with Jamie in some regions, with slightly different formatting and titles, as well as less focus on the Pricing (as this was tailored to UK pricing).
2014 -	Jamie & Jimmy's Friday Night Feast	8 series 60 episodes (~47 min.)	Oliver and Doherty join forces again at their end-of-the-pier café to make top feasts for the weekend. This series focused on championing "lost" British classic foods such as the Bedfordshire clanger and Maid of Honour Tarts and each episode features a different Celebrity in the Café helping them cook.
2014	Jamie's Comfort Food	8 episodes (~24 min.) or 6 episodes (~47 min.) in some regions	An eight-part series based on the recipes in the Jamie's Comfort Food book which aims to teach people how to make rich, fun and delicious comfort food for larger groups. In some regions the series was re-edited into six longer episodes with additional footage.
2014	Jamie's Cracking Christmas	1 episode (~47 min.)	Christmas special in which Jamie Oliver aims to raise Christmas cooking to a new level with recipes including roast goose, cheeky cocktails and a panettone treat.
2015	Jamie's Super Food	2 series 7+8 episodes (~24 min.)	The series focuses on the recipes in the Jamie's Super Food book which aims to teach people how to make rich, fun and delicious food that tastes good and is full of nutrients and is good for us. During the series Jamie Oliver travels to some of the healthiest places in the world to uncover the secrets of how people there live longer and healthier lives. The first series was re-edited into 47-minute episodes in some regions with additional footage.
2015	Jamie's Sugar Rush	1 episode (~47 min.)	One-off television documentary, which looks at the sugar in products and why we should be worried about it, that was screened in the UK prior to the start of "Jamie's Super Food".
2015	Jamie's Night Before Christmas	1 episode (~46 min.)	Christmas special in which Jamie presents his classic and new festive favourite recipes.
2016	Jamie's Super Food Family Classics	6 episodes (~44 min.)	The series follows on from the original Jamie's Super Food series and focuses on the recipes in the Jamie's Super Food Family Classics book. It aims at teaching people how to make rich, fun and delicious Family "Classic" meals that taste good and is full of nutrients, good for them and that the whole family will enjoy.
2016	Jamie Oliver's Christmas Cookbook	1 episode (~47 min.)	Jamie Oliver has been cooking Christmas for his family for 20 years. In this one-off Christmas special he wants to show us his ultimate recipes – the ones he's decided that really are the very very best for Christmas. Based on the book of the same title.
2017-2020	Jamie's Quick & Easy Food	4 series 26 episodes (23-28 min.)	A Channel 4 series based on the recipes in Oliver's book 5 Ingredients: Quick & Easy Food which aims to show people how to cook great food from just five ingredients - plus a few staples - quickly and easily.
2017	Jamie's Italian Christmas	1 episode (~47 min.)	One-off Christmas special, where Jamie makes an Italian inspired Christmas feast.
2018	Jamie Cooks Italy	8 episodes (~24 min. 45-48 min. in some regions)	Jamie and his mentor, Gennaro, go on a tour of Italy where they cook up traditional Italian and Italian-inspired dishes and meet some of the local people.
2018	Jamie's Quick & Easy Christmas	1 episode (~48 min.)	Christmas special in which Jamie Oliver applies his quick and easy principles to cooking at Christmas.
2019	Jamie's Meat-Free Meals / Jamie's Ultimate Veg	8 episodes (~23 min.) or 6 episodes (~45 min.) in some regions	Jamie wants people to eat less meat and try more vegetables, finding inspiration from countries around the world to cook a stunning collection of stunning hearty and healthy veg dishes that are easy and delicious. In some regions the series was re-edited into six longer episodes with additional footage.
2019	Jamie's Easy Christmas Countdown	1 episode (~47 min.)	Christmas special that was first shown on 15 December 2019 on Channel 4.
2019	Jamie and Jimmy's Festive Feast	1 episode (~47 min.)	Jamie & Jimmy's Friday Night Feast Christmas special with special guest Taron Egerton, premiered on 25 December 2019 on Channel 4.
2020	Jamie: Keep Cooking and Carry On	20 episodes (~23 min.)	Premiered on 23 March 2020, Jamie prepares food with limited ingredients and substitutions, for the locked down and homebound, for the crowd isolated by the COVID-19 pandemic. Episodes are filmed on Jamie's and his family's phones, with his family serving as crew. The show has been criticised for using techniques and ingredients not found in a typical home, instead only found in a home where people cook traditionally or ambitiously.
2020	Jamie: Keep Cooking Family Favourites / Jamie's Easy Meals For Every Day	2 series 8+10 episodes (~23 min.)	A television series based on the recipes from Oliver's 7 Ways book, which aims to show people how to cook simple, affordable and delicious meals using common household ingredients. Series one premiered 17 August 2020 on Channel 4. Series two premiered on 22 February 2021 on Channel 4.
2020	Jamie: Keep Cooking at Christmas	2 episodes (~47 min.)	Two-part Christmas special, first shown during December 2020 on Channel 4
2020	Jamie and Jimmy's Festive Feast	1 episode (~47 min.)	Jamie & Jimmy's Friday Night Feast Christmas special with special guests Joe Wicks & Sam Smith, premiered on 29 December 2020 on Channel 4.
2021	Jamie Oliver: Together	6 episodes (~47 min.)	Six-part series, which sees Jamie sharing menus for those first meals with our loved ones since the COVID-19 lockdowns began.
2021	Jamie: Together At Christmas	2 episodes (~47 min.)	Two-part Christmas special which aired in the UK as part of the Channel 4 programme "Jamie Oliver: Together", while it also has been presented at other services as individual program, with the episode titles "Christmas Party" and "Christmas Dinner", respectively.
2021	Selena + Chef		Celebrity chef; S3-E10
2022	The Great Cookbook Challenge With Jamie Oliver	7 episodes (~47 min.)	Seven-part series.
2022	Jamie's One-Pan Wonders	8 episodes (~23 min.)	Eight-part series, in which Oliver introduces recipes and provides guide for meals cooked in just one pan.
2022	Jamie's £1 Wonders	Original one-off (~47 min.)	First shown on 31 October 2022 on Channel 4
2022	Jamie's Easy Christmas	2 episodes (~47 min.)	Two-part Christmas special, first shown during December 2022 on Channel 4
2023	Jamie's £1 Wonders / Jamie Oliver: Cooking For Less	6 episodes (~47 min.)	Six-part Channel 4 series, that aired during March–April 2023.
2023	Jamie Cooks The Mediterranean	4 episodes (~47 min.)	Four-part Channel 4 series, first shown during September–October 2023.
2023	Jamie's Five Ingredient Meals	4 episodes (~47 min.)	Channel 4 series, first shown during October–November 2023.
2023	Jamie's Christmas Shortcuts	2 episodes (~47 min.)	Two-part Channel 4 series.
2024	Jamie's Air-Fryer Meals	2 episodes (~47 min.)	Two-part Channel 4 series
2024	Jamie Cooks Spring	3 episodes (~47 min.)	Three-part Channel 4 series. It is the first series in Oliver's year-long quest to 'cook the seasons' featuring dishes made with seasonal ingredients.
2024	Jamie: What to Eat this Week	3 episodes (~47 min.)	Three-part Channel 4 series, the second featuring dishes made with seasonal ingredients
2024	Jamie: What to Eat this Week: Autumn	3 episodes (~47 min.)	Three-part Channel 4 series featuring dishes made with Autumn ingredients
2024	Jamie: Fast and Simple	5 episodes (~47 min.)	Five-part Channel 4 series featuring quick meals
2024	Jamie Cooks Christmas	2 episodes (~47 min.)	Two-part Channel 4 festive cookery series
2025	Jamie Cooks: Georgia	1 episode (~47 min.)	One-off Channel 4 programme
2025	Jamie's Dyslexia Revolution	One-off documentary (~47 min.)	One-off Channel 4 documentary
2025	Eat Yourself Healthy	5 episodes (~47 min.)	Five-part Channel 4 series
2025	Jamie's Cook-Ahead Christmas	2 episodes (~47 min.)	Two-part Channel 4 Christmas cookery series
2026	Jamie's Feasts for a Fiver	6 episodes (~47 min.)	Six-part Channel 4 cookery series featuring nutritious dishes to feed families for under £5.
2026	Jamie's Ultimate BBQ	3 episodes (~47 min.)	Three-part Channel 4 BBQ cookery series.
2026	Jamie's 20-Minute Meals	8 episodes (~47 min.)	Eight-part Channel 4 cookery series; each episode is filmed entirely in one continuous take to prove the recipes are achievable in the allotted time.

=== Books ===
Oliver has published over 30 books. He is the second-best-selling British author, behind J. K. Rowling, and the best-selling British non-fiction author since records began. As of February 2019, Oliver had sold more than 14.55 million books, generating just under £180m for the chef.

In 2023, Oliver released his first children's book Billy and the Giant Adventure. A sequel, Billy and the Epic Escape was released the following March, depicted the same children as the first book on a fantastic summer vacation. Led by an Australian Indigenous Australian education advocacy group, the sequel was sharply criticised for its representation of Indigenous Australians, and as being insensitive to the history of the Stolen Generations. In November, Oliver recalled the book and said he apologised for unintentionally causing offence.

- The Naked Chef (Michael Joseph, 1999) ISBN 9780718143602
- The Return of the Naked Chef (Michael Joseph, 2000) ISBN 9780718144395
  - Published in the United States as The Naked Chef Takes Off (Hachette, 2001) ISBN 9780786867554
- Happy Days with the Naked Chef (Michael Joseph, 2001) ISBN 9780718144845
- Jamie's Kitchen (Michael Joseph, 2002) ISBN 9780718145644
- Funky Food for Comic Relief (Penguin, 2003) ISBN 9780141014074
- Jamie's Dinners (Michael Joseph, 2004) ISBN 9780718146863
- Jamie's Italy (Michael Joseph, 2005) ISBN 9780718147709
- Something for the Weekend (Penguin, 2005) ISBN 9780141022581
- Cook with Jamie: My Guide to Making You a Better Cook (Michael Joseph, 2006) ISBN 9780718147716
- Jamie's Little Book of Big Treats (Penguin, 2007) ISBN 9780141031460
- Jamie at Home: Cook Your Way to the Good Life (Michael Joseph, 2007) ISBN 9780718152437
- Jamie's Ministry of Food: Anyone Can Learn to Cook in 24 Hours (Michael Joseph, 2008) ISBN 9780718148621
  - Published in the United States as Jamie's Food Revolution: Rediscover How to Cook Simple, Delicious, Affordable Meals (Hachette, 2008) ISBN 9781401323592
- Jamie's Red Nose Recipes (Penguin, 2009) ISBN 9780141041780
- Jamie's America (Michael Joseph, 2009) ISBN 9780718154769
- Jamie does...Spain, Italy, Sweden, Morocco, Greece, France (Michael Joseph, 2010) ISBN 9780718158545
- Jamie's 30-Minute Meals (Michael Joseph, 2010) ISBN 9780718157678
- Jamie's Great Britain (Michael Joseph, 2011) ISBN 9780718156817
- Jamie's Monster Bake Sale (Penguin, 2011) ISBN 9780241954256
- Jamie's 15-Minute Meals (Michael Joseph, 2012) ISBN 9780718157807
- Save with Jamie (Michael Joseph, 2013) ISBN 9780718158149
- Jamie's Comfort Food (Michael Joseph, 2014) ISBN 9780718159535
- Everyday Super Food (Michael Joseph, 2015) ISBN 9780718181239
- Super Food Family Classics (Michael Joseph, 2016) ISBN 9780718178444
- Jamie Oliver's Christmas Cookbook (Michael Joseph, 2016) ISBN 9780718183653
- 5 Ingredients – Quick & Easy Food (Michael Joseph, 2017) ISBN 9780718187729
- Jamie Cooks Italy (Michael Joseph, 2018) ISBN 9780718187736
- Jamie's Friday Night Feast Cookbook (Michael Joseph, 2018) ISBN 9780241371442
- Veg: Easy & Delicious Meals for Everyone (Michael Joseph, 2019) ISBN 9780718187767
- 7 Ways (Michael Joseph, 2020) ISBN 9780241431153
- Together (Michael Joseph, 2021) ISBN 978-0241431177
- One: Simple One-Pan Wonders (Michael Joseph, 2022) ISBN 978-0241431108
- 5 Ingredients Mediterranean (Michael Joseph, 2023) ISBN 978-0241431160
- Simply Jamie (Michael Joseph, 2024) ISBN 978-0241657805
- Easy Air Fryer: Big & Bold Delicious Food (Michael Joseph, 2025) ISBN 978-0241733431
- Eat Yourself Healthy: Food to Change Your Life (Michael Joseph, 2025) ISBN 978-1405958141
- BBQ (Penguin Books, 2026) ISBN 9780-241797075
- Love Veggies with Jamie Oliver! (Magic Cat Publishing, 2026 ISBN 9781917768368
- 20-Minute Meals: Real Fast Food (Penguin Books, 2026) ISBN 9780241657850

=== Other media appearances ===
Oliver has twice guest-hosted Channel 4's The Friday Night Project and has appeared twice in the "Star in a Reasonably-Priced Car" segment of BBC Two's Top Gear. In his first appearance he attempted to make a green salad in the back of his Volkswagen Microbus, which was fitted with a Porsche engine, while the Stig drove it around the Top Gear test track.

Oliver is the second British celebrity chef (after Robert Irvine) to appear as a challenger on Iron Chef America, taking on Iron Chef Mario Batali in 2008 in a losing battle with cobia as the theme ingredient.

Oliver was one of the judges in the Oprah's Big Give hosted by Oprah Winfrey in the United States in 2008.

Oliver had an Australian tour in 2006, when he performed in Sydney and Melbourne. Following the entertaining format of his first live show, the 2006 Australian tour featured special guests including mentor Gennaro Contaldo, and students from Fifteen London. He performed a new song written by Leigh Haggerwood called Fish Stew which Oliver cooked to and also drummed along to at the end of the show. The shows were featured in a one-off TV documentary called Jamie Oliver: Australian Diary.

On 27 December 2022, Oliver was the guest editor on the Today Programme on BBC Radio 4.

Oliver appeared as himself in the music video for Irish singer CMAT's single "The Jamie Oliver Petrol Station", which was released on 14 March 2026.

=== Advertising ===
Oliver giving a talk at Davos about driving a healthy and sustainable food revolution.

From June 2000, Oliver became the public face of the Sainsbury's supermarket chain in the UK, appearing on television and radio advertisements and in-store promotional material. The deal earned him an estimated £1.2 million every year.

He was criticised by Sainsbury's CEO Justin King after Oliver criticised the "junk" sold by supermarkets that ends up in the lunchboxes of millions of children. King reportedly hit back, saying: "Dictating to people—or unleashing an expletive-filled tirade—is not the way to get engagement." In July 2011, after eleven years, the partnership between Oliver and Sainsbury's ended. The final television advertisement was for Christmas 2011.

Oliver also promotes a range of non-stick pans and cookware for Tefal and has appeared in Australian television commercials for Yalumba wines, using Del Boy's catchphrase of "Lovely Jubbly".

In August 2013, Oliver and Canadian supermarket chain Sobeys announced a partnership in improving nationwide nutrition and advertising campaigns.

In October 2013, he began a partnership with the Australian supermarket chain Woolworths on a series of better nutrition initiatives and advertising campaigns. In 2014, Oliver became the culinary face of Woolworths. Oliver came under strong criticism over the funding of the advertising surrounding his relationship with the supermarket.

In January 2016, Oliver and HelloFresh, an international meal kit subscription service, announced a partnership to incorporate his recipes to the weekly subscription deliveries. Customers receive one recipe written by Oliver with all the exact ingredients and steps for the dish.

In September 2018, Oliver created a series of recipes and tips for Tesco and participated in the promotion of the company's food products.

In 2019, Oliver partnered with Royal Dutch Shell to offer a Jamie Oliver Deli by Shell branded range at 500 Shell petrol stations in the UK for £5 million. The deal was criticised as a way to improve their image due to Shell's lack of action on climate change, corruption and bribery allegations and damaged Oliver's image of working in the interests of children and for action on climate change.

== Charity work and campaigning ==
Oliver conceived and established the Fifteen charity restaurant, where he trained disadvantaged young people to work in the hospitality industry. Following the success of the original restaurant in London, more Fifteens have opened around the globe: Fifteen Amsterdam opened in December 2004, Fifteen Cornwall in Newquay in May 2006 and Fifteen Melbourne in September 2006 with an Australian friend and fellow chef Tobie Puttock. Fifteen Melbourne has since closed, as has Fifteen Cornwall.

In 2005, Oliver initiated a campaign originally called "Feed Me Better" to move British schoolchildren towards eating healthy foods and cutting out junk food. As a result, the British government also pledged to address the issue. His public campaign for changes in nutrition resulted in people voting him as the "Most Inspiring Political Figure of 2005", according to a Channel 4 News annual viewer poll. His emphasis on cooking fresh, nutritious food continued as he created Jamie's Ministry of Food, a television series where Oliver travelled to inspire everyday people in Rotherham, Yorkshire, to cook healthy meals. Another television series is Jamie Oliver's Food Revolution (2010–11), where he travelled first to Huntington, West Virginia and then to Los Angeles to change the way Americans eat, and address their dependence on fast food.

Oliver began a formal campaign to ban unhealthy food in British schools and to get children eating nutritious food instead. Oliver's efforts to bring radical change to the school meals system, chronicled in the series Jamie's School Dinners, challenged the junk-food culture by showing schools they could serve healthy, cost-efficient meals that kids enjoyed eating. His efforts brought the subject of school dinners to the political forefront and changed the types of food served in schools.

In December 2009, Oliver was awarded the 2010 TED Prize for his campaigns to "create change on both the individual and governmental levels" to "bring attention to the changes that the English, and now Americans, need to make in their lifestyles and diet". In 2010, he joined several other celebrity chefs on the series The Big Fish Fight, in which Oliver and fellow chefs Hugh Fearnley-Whittingstall and Gordon Ramsay made a variety of programmes to raise awareness about the discarding of hundreds of thousands of saltwater fish because the fishermen are prohibited from keeping any fish other than the stated target of the trawl. He is a patron of environmental charity Trees for Cities.

In April 2022, he co-organized together with Ukrainian chef Yurii Kovryzhenko a charity dinner in London within an initiative #CookForUkraine to raise money for Ukrainians who suffered from Russian invasion of Ukraine.

Oliver and Gordon Ramsay are spokespeople for the "Big Fish Fight", which campaigns for sustainable seafood, but were criticised for their use of endangered fish.

Oliver has been criticised for underestimating the cost of supposedly cheap food he encouraged poor people to prepare for themselves, as well as for an unrealistic view of poverty in Britain and in Southern Europe. Cookery writer and poverty campaigner Jack Monroe stated that Oliver's comments "support damaging myths that poor people are only poor because they spend their money on the wrong things, rather than being constrained by time, equipment, knowledge or practicalities".

== Views and criticism ==
Oliver has spoken out against Marco Pierre White, who has been critical of Oliver in the past, and at the profanity with which chef Gordon Ramsay speaks to his staff.

In February 2017, Oliver criticised the Red Tractor scheme, earning the ire of farming leaders, such as Minette Batters, the president of the NFU. Oliver said: "Chickens are bred to grow fast with a high ratio of meat to bone, but this makes them heavy so they can struggle to walk...I think people would be shocked by the reality of what we are buying...I personally wouldn't feed it to my kids." Batters responded: "There are a lot of people on tight budgets and they must not be disadvantaged in all of this. It is about making sure we can provide quality affordable, safe, traceable food to everybody regardless of budgets, regardless of background."

In 2005, Oliver was widely criticised by animal rights groups for slaughtering a lamb on his TV show without first stunning it, with PETA stating that it showed to the public problems with the methods used within slaughterhouses. PETA spokesman Sean Gifford said that it was hoped the footage "could turn the more die-hard carnivore into a vegetarian". TV regulator Ofcom reported seven complaints from the public.

== Awards and honours ==
On 13 May 2001, Oliver's series The Naked Chef won the BAFTA award for Best Feature at the prestigious 2001 British Academy Television Awards, held at the Grosvenor House Hotel in Park Lane, London.

In June 2003, Oliver was appointed MBE in the Queen's Birthday Honours.

On 21 August 2010, Oliver won an Emmy for Jamie Oliver's Food Revolution at the 62nd Primetime Creative Arts Emmy Awards. The series tackled the problem of childhood obesity in America.

In 2013, Oliver was awarded an Honorary Fellowship by the Royal College of General Practitioners for his work in tackling childhood obesity by improving the nutritional value of school dinners.

In 2019, Oliver was awarded the Order of the Star of Italy with the rank of Knight. The investiture took place at the Italian embassy in 2021.

== Personal life ==
In July 2000, Oliver married the former model and writer Juliette Norton, usually known as "Jools". They have five children. During the summer of 2019, Oliver and his family moved into Spains Hall, the 16th-century mansion in Finchingfield, Essex. The property is located on a 70-acre (28 ha) estate and includes a six-bedroom farmhouse, three-bedroom lodge, swimming pool, tennis court and converted stables.

Oliver has severe dyslexia, and read his first novel, Catching Fire, by American novelist Suzanne Collins (the second book in the three-book The Hunger Games series) in 2013, at the age of 38.
