= Fifteen Melbourne =

Restaurant and charity

Coordinates: 37°48′53″S 144°58′12″E

- Company type: Private
- Industry: Hospitality
- Headquarters: Melbourne, Australia (2006)
- Key people: Tobie Puttock (executive head chef); Warren Flannigan (head chef); Julian Lobb (sous chef)
- Owner: Adam Garrisson and Tobie Puttock
- Website: www.fifteenmelbourne.com.au

Fifteen restaurant and its associated charity was a concept originally created by British chef Jamie Oliver in London in 2002 when he realised he could use his skills and energy to offer disadvantaged and marginalised young people with tough backgrounds an opportunity to train to be chefs.

Oliver founded the original Fifteen restaurant in London and put young people at its heart. Since 2002 two further restaurants opened in Amsterdam and Cornwall. Melbourne, Australia was the fourth restaurant in the Fifteen 'family'.

== Fire ==
On 8 June 2008, the offices of Fifteen Melbourne was burned in a fire lit by its former manager, Kevin Stralow. Stralow caused over A$1 million of damage to the premises to hide thefts which funded a gambling habit. In April 2011 he pleaded not guilty, but was found guilty by jury of 16 counts of theft and one count of arson, and in June 2011 was sentenced to 2½ years' jail. It reopened as 'The Kitchen Cat' in January 2011 and closed in 2012.

== See also ==
- List of restaurants in Australia
