= At Home with David Jones =

Australian television series

- Genre: Lifestyle
- Presented by: Marge Christian
- Country of origin: Australia
- Original language: English

Production
- Running time: 30 minutes

Original release
- Network: CTC-7
- Release: 1963 – 1964

At Home with David Jones is an Australian television series which aired from 1963 to 1964 on Canberra station CTC-7. It was among a small number of television series produced in that state during the 1960s, and was among the earliest such series. The series was about cooking and interior decorating. "David Jones" was not a person on the series, rather it referred to the name of the sponsor, department store David Jones.

The series was hosted by Marge Christian.

== See also ==
- Tonight in Canberra
- An Evening With
- Canberra Week
