= Ken and Jonathan =

- Genre: Game show
- Presented by: Ken Delo; Jonathan Daly
- Country of origin: Australia
- Original language: English

Production
- Running time: 60 minutes

Original release
- Network: Seven Network
- Release: 27 April – 24 July 1964

Ken and Jonathan is an Australian daytime television series which aired in 1964. Featuring Ken Delo and Jonathan Daly, it was a game show which aired on the Seven Network. The series featured two segments, Who Do You Trust? and Name that Tune. Their prime-time variety series, The Delo and Daly Show continued its run while the daytime series aired. The series aired in a 60-minute time-slot.
