= Canberra Week =

Australian television series

- Genre: Lifestyle
- Presented by: Fraser Parkes
- Country of origin: Australia
- Original language: English

Original release
- Network: ABC Canberra
- Release: 11 July 1963 – 24 February 1966

Canberra Week is an Australian television series which aired only in Canberra.

The series aired on ABC, and included a news segment, interviews and a gardening segment. It ran from 1963 to 1965, and aired in a 25-minute time-slot. It was replaced with Studio 11 in 1966. It was one of a small number of television series produced in Canberra during the 1960s, among the others included Tonight in Canberra, The Line on Canberra, An Evening With, Canberra Gardener, At Home with David Jones, and a version of TV Jackpot Quiz.
