= Bob Rogers (DJ) =

Australian disc jockey and radio broadcaster (1926–2024)

Bob Rogers OAM
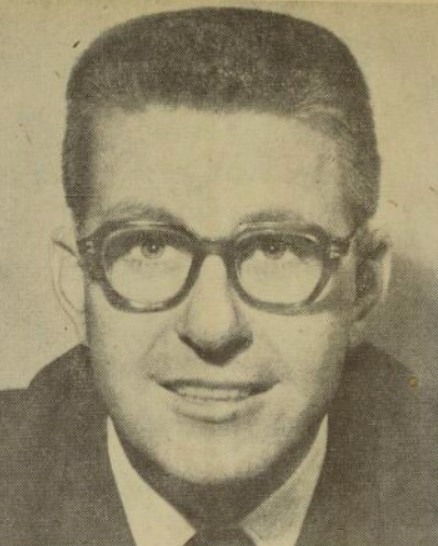
- Bob Rogers in 1958
- Born: Robert Barton Rogers; 3 December 1926; Melbourne, Victoria, Australia
- Died: 29 May 2024 (aged 97); Mosman, New South Wales, Australia
- Occupations: Disc jockey, radio announcer, television host
- Years active: 1942−2020

Robert Barton Rogers OAM (3 December 1926 – 29 May 2024) was an Australian disc jockey and radio broadcaster. He was noted for introducing Top 40 radio programming to Australia in 1958, on 2UE.

Before his retirement in October 2020, Rogers presented the six-hour Saturday evening Reminiscing program on Sydney radio station 2CH. He had previously presented The Bob Rogers Show on weekday mornings. His broadcasting career lasted 78 years.

== Early life ==
Rogers was born on 3 December 1926 to British parents and raised in Donald, Victoria. His father had been a junior butcher before becoming a farmer. He used to help his father round up the sheep and catch the lambs before slaughter.

== Career ==
Rogers began his career as a panel operator for 3XY in Melbourne in 1942. Moving onto a Hobart station, he worked six days a week as a radio announcer, including presenting racing on Saturdays. Soon, Rogers was given permission to start a Sunday afternoon music program, playing new records given to him by American sailors.

Rogers resigned and started a similar music program on Brisbane's 4BH in 1950. In 1957, Rogers discovered the Slim Dusty song "Pub With No Beer" and was the first DJ in Australia to play the song and bring it to number one on the charts. Rogers subsequently presented Australia's first Top 40 show on 2UE from 1958 to 1962.

For the next 8 years, Rogers was Australia's top radio DJ. He was tried out in a television talk show format on TCN-9, following Daly at Night with Jonathan Daly. He later established himself as a television host, on ATN-7, with a run from 1969 of over four years.

In 1962 Rogers joined 2SM, one of the "Good Guys" DJ team the station recruited, with Mike Walsh and others; 2SM jumped in the ratings to number 1. In 1964 Rogers was chosen to represent 2SM on The Beatles' tour through Europe, Asia and Australia. He made radio interviews with them in June.

Rogers returned to 2UE and presented his morning radio show with a new format of provocative commentary, gossip and music. His programme became popular amongst interview-hungry artists. In 1976, Rogers wrote Rock And Roll Australia, a book about the birth of the Australian rock industry. In 1982, he started a chain of women's dress shops.

In October 1976, Rogers joined 2GB, but his time with the station was short-lived. While compering the 2GB morning program, in June 1977, Rogers was sacked, after he failed to use the seven-second-delay button, during an on-air conversation with John Singleton. Singleton's use of a 'four-letter word' was broadcast. The topic of conversation was Rogers' imminent change of time slot to an afternoon segment.

=== 2CH radio ===
In November 1995, Rogers accepted John Singleton's offer and joined Sydney radio station 2CH. On 21 February 2007, according to the Nielsen radio ratings survey, Bob Rogers' Morning show became the fourth most heard radio programme in Sydney in that particular timeslot by beating John Laws of 2UE into fifth place. It is generally more difficult for an easy listening station in Sydney to achieve a greater audience share than a talkback station. Overall, 2CH has overtaken 2UE to claim sixth place.

On 5 December 2007, Rogers was verbally abused with obscenities by long-time professional rival John Laws, in unprovoked circumstances whilst dining at lunch with 3AW personality Derryn Hinch in a Woolloomooloo restaurant. Rogers was awarded the Medal of the Order of Australia (OAM) in the 2010 Birthday Honours for "service to the media as a radio broadcaster".

After suffering a stroke while on air in 2018, Rogers announced in November 2018 that he would stop presenting his morning programme. He continued presenting his Reminiscing program on Saturdays until 3 October 2020, when he finally retired.

== Radio career breakdown ==
Network	Tenure	Role
3XY	1942–1950	Panel operator
Hobart radio		Radio announcer and Host of Sunday Afternoon music program
4BH	1950–1957	Disc jockey
2UE	1958–1962	Presenter of Top 40
2SM	1962–1995	Disc jockey
2UE		Morning program presenter
2GB	1976–1977	Morning program presenter
2CH	1995–2018	Morning program presenter and host of program Reminiscing
	2024	Inducted into the Australian Commercial Radio Hall of Fame

== Death ==
Rogers died in Mosman on 29 May 2024, at the age of 97.
