= CTC (TV station) =

- Southern New South Wales & ACT; Australia
- City: Canberra
- Channels: Digital: 6 (VHF); Virtual: 5
- Branding: 10

Programming
- Language: English
- Network: 10

Ownership
- Owner: Paramount Networks UK & Australia (Ten Network Holdings); (Australian Capital Television Pty Ltd)

History
- Founded: 19 May 1958
- First air date: 2 June 1962
- Former channel number: Analog: 7 (VHF) (1962–2012)
- Former affiliations: Independent (2 June 1962 – 31 March 1989); Network 10 (31 March 1989 – 30 June 2016, 1 July 2021 – present); Nine Network (1 July 2016 – 30 June 2021)
- Call sign meaning: Capital Television Canberra

Technical information
- Licensing authority: Australian Communications and Media Authority
- ERP: see table below
- HAAT: see table below
- Transmitter coordinates: see table below

Links
- Public licence information: Profile

CTC is a television station in Canberra, Australia. The station was the tenth to begin transmission in regional Australia, and the 26th station in Australia as a whole. CTC is owned and operated directly from Network 10. Just as it has had a number of owners, CTC has also had many different identities on-air – including CTC-TV, Super 7, Capital 7, 10 TV Australia, Capital Television, Ten Capital, Southern Cross Ten, Channel 9 and Channel 10. The station is owned and operated by Network 10.

== History ==
=== Origins ===
The station's history can be traced back to 19 May 1958, when Canberra Television Limited (or CTL), a public company, was formed by executives of The Federal Capital Press of Australia Pty. Ltd. (owner of The Canberra Times newspaper) and Canberra Broadcasters Pty Ltd (owner of local radio station 2CA). Both companies injected A£45,000 (A$90,000) into the business in order to apply for the Canberra-area commercial television licence. The first chairman of the newly formed company was Arthur Shakespeare, founder of The Canberra Times. Alongside four other applicants, CTL submitted their licence application to the Australian Broadcasting Control Board (ABCB) in April 1959. The company went public in September of the same year, on the Australian Securities Exchange in Sydney, offering 100,000 shares which were immediately oversubscribed, ending up with a total subscribed capital of A£300,000 (A$600,000). The two key shareholders in CTL made an agreement with all other shareholders that all shares were to be bought back in the event that they were unsuccessful in their licence bid — they need not have worried, since after a hearing of considerable length, the ABCB decided to grant CTL the licence in November 1960. The callsign for the station was to be CTC and the new service was to transmit on VHF channel 7.

Prior to the acquisition of the licence, CTL needed to find suitable sites for both a studio and a transmitter. Initially, Mount Ainslie (approximately 10 km north-east of Canberra's city centre, at an elevation of 842 m above sea level) was considered as a potential transmitter site. It was turned down, however, because it was already under the control of the Department of Civil Aviation (who would be unwilling to surrender or lease the site due to its proximity to the Airport and the Air Force base). It was also determined that a transmitter located atop Mount Ainslie would not provide ample coverage of the entire Canberra area (notable black-spots would have included the Woden and Belconnen districts), nor would there be enough room for the ABC's television transmitter (whose service was due to commence in December 1962) as well as CTC. Other sites considered included Mounts Gray, Bowning, Ginini and Bull's Head.

Ultimately, the site chosen for both the transmitter and the studio was Black Mountain, approximately 5 km west of the city centre at 812 m above sea level. Extensive tests from the site proved that it was the ideal location for the transmitter, with signals adequately covering the Canberra area. The ABC also decided to place their transmitter atop Black Mountain — both would be perched atop guyed masts (as opposed to towers) with each rising to 126 metres and 152 metres, respectively. ABC's studio would be located in Canberra city proper. In order to access the transmitters and studio, a road needed to be built up to the summit — construction commenced in July 1961. CTL were granted the lease to the Black Mountain site on 26 September 1961.

The studio complex, which, in later years, would be affectionately known as 'the tin shed' was planned, designed and constructed by Civil & Civic over a period of 28 weeks (from September 1961 – March 1962) at a total cost of £77,912 (A$155,824). Occupying a 9,400 square metres (101,000 square feet) site, the complex featured a 140-square-metre studio area and was fitted out with RCA equipment — two TK-12 4½" image orthicon cameras were purchased for use in the studio at a cost of £8,000 (A$16 000) each. The transmitter (whose mast was erected in March 1962) was custom-designed by Co-El of Italy, and the mast EPT Limited in Sydney.

Test transmissions started on 2 April 1962 and local reports of excellent picture quality exceeded expectations in coverage area. It was reported the vast majority of Canberra and Queanbeyan viewers required no outside antenna at all. Viewers in Yass reported a perfect signal and homes in higher parts of Cooma also, unexpectedly, were able to receive CTC 7. Goulburn television retailers reported heavy set orders in the lead-up to CTC's commencement - though the town could already enjoy a television signal from WIN 4 Wollongong.

=== Opening night ===
By the end of April 1962, both the studio and transmitter was completed and the first test patterns were transmitted. On 23 May 1962 at 5:45pm, the first live test transmission took place with the Safety Bureau Officer, Senior Constable T. A. M. Cooper presenting a 13-minute public service announcement on the proper use of fireworks.

Although CTC 7 commenced transmission at 6pm on 2 June 1962 with various program promotions and a documentary on the construction of the CTC studios, the official opening was not to take place until 7pm — as well as Postmaster-General Charles Davidson, CTL chairmen A. T. Shakespeare, Sir Patrick McGovern and station manager George Barlin also assisted with the opening proceedings. An introduction to CTC's on-screen personalities was followed by a news summary. Viewers were then treated to a film of the Queen's Birthday Procession from the military barracks at Duntroon (filmed earlier that day), followed by an hour of variety with The B.P. Super Show hosted by Margaret Fonteyn. The detective series Michael Shayne made its premiere on CTC then a kinescope of the opening ceremony was screened. The first night's programming concluded with an epilogue and a preview of the following day's programs before ending transmission at 10:30pm.

=== Welcoming the neighbours ===
On 18 December 1962, CTC-7's first television rival, ABC-3, commenced broadcasting in Canberra. CTC manager George Barlin welcomed the arrival of the new station, which would viewers in the area would have a 'complete television service'. Mr Barlin pointed out there had been a great enthusiasm for television in the Canberra area, with around 42% of homes owning or renting a television within six months of the commencement of local television services.

CTC relayed its first program to another station on 11 October 1964, with a simulcast transmission of an Olympic Games presentation by RVN-2 in Wagga. Olympic Games reports were received at the new ABC-3 studios in Canberra, which was connected to ABN-2 Sydney via coaxial cable. The video-taped footage was then prepared for screening by CTC-7 that evening. RVN-2 installed new receiving equipment to repeat a clear signal from Canberra.

=== 1970s – Colouring the Capital ===
CTC was a pioneer of colour television, commissioning the first purpose-built colour production studio and film laboratory in Australia. The new facility in Watson opened in October 1974 costing over $2 million and boasted sales and administration, a full size production studio supplemented by two smaller studios for commercial recordings and on-air presentation. As the facility was fully equipped only with colour equipment over 80% of the broadcasts were in colour, five months before the official commencement date of 1 March 1975. Although technically in breach of the Australian Broadcasting Control Board rules, CTC was the first television station in Australia to broadcast the majority of its output in colour. A rare piece of CTC colour news film from 21 October 1974 can be seen at the National Film & Sound Archive.

=== 1980s – From Super 7 to Channel 10 ===
Capital 7 identity 1981

Kerry Stokes acquired a majority stake in CTC from John Fairfax & Sons warehousing company Surita on 7 May 1980, heading off a rival bid from Television Wollongong Transmissions Ltd (owners of WIN 4) which had increased its stake from 5 to 15 per cent. At the time Stokes owned a share in the Golden West Network in Western Australia.

The station shrugged off its decidedly 70s Super 7 branding and the call sign letters CTC were reintroduced to the station identity.

The 1980s were an exciting time in Canberra city. Telecom Tower, a 195.2 metres (640 ft) broadcasting facility atop Black Mountain opened on 15 May 1980 and quickly became a major Canberra landmark. A vital link for television and telephone connections between Sydney and Melbourne, the tower also became the transmission site for CTC's primary VHF 7 signal alongside ABC on VHF 3 and ABC FM 101.9. CTC's original studio building was demolished to make way for the tower and the station produced a 12-minute film on the construction of Telecom Tower which was shown at the visitor's centre.

No sooner had Telecom Tower opened, work commenced on Canberra's other most prominent landmark – a new Parliament House. A building so large it would have its own unique postcode. On 1 July 1981, CTC embarked upon a massive rebrand. A new logo whose design and colours were based on the Australian national flag was introduced and Capital 7 burst on to screens. Reflecting Canberra's status as the heart of the nation, the station produced a 60-second feel-good promo and promotional 45 RPM single, Song for Canberra which featured early earthworks at Parliament House and showcased a vibrant and young capital.

Under Stokes the number of broadcast hours increased and the local news bulletin was scaled up from a 15-minute auxiliary to a full local, national and international service. In 1982 breakfast television commenced on CTC, with a relay of Nine Network programming. Canberra's only commercial television station beginning to more closely resembling a metropolitan station and in 1983 CTC celebrated 21 years of broadcasting. The station celebrated with a slight re-brand and the introduction of a new jingle Look at Us. A one-minute promo explaining to the viewers how professional the new image was went to air that year.

CTC's second rival, Network 0-28 (now SBS), was officially launched in Canberra on 14 October 1983 - its first expansion outside Sydney and Melbourne. Commencing at 6.58pm with the national anthem, the channel launch was officiated by the Prime Minister in a program called Bringing the World Back Home, also the station's slogan at the time. Network 28 was Canberra's first UHF television station and broadcast UHF Documentary to explain to viewers how to receive it. A telephone survey conducted after the first weekend of broadcast found that 74% of Canberrans could receive UHF and of those, 65% found the network's programs more interesting than those on ABC and Capital 7.

In 1987 the Broadcasting (Ownership and Control) Act replaced the Two TV Station rule – which had capped ownership of Metropolitan TV stations at two – with a 60% Reach rule. This would pave the way for major changes in television ownership in Australia as the three television networks expanded beyond Sydney and Melbourne, buying their affiliates in other capitals. At the time Kerry Stokes owned ADS in Adelaide, CTC in Canberra and had just won the licence for NEW in Perth. Stokes had planned to buy the Seven Network from John Fairfax & Sons which would have seen CTC align with ATN in Sydney and HSV in Melbourne. Stokes offered $100 million more than rival Christopher Skase for Seven, but was ultimately unsuccessful.

Not able to build a metropolitan television network and with the costs associated with regional television aggregation looming, Stokes decided to sell. On 7 August 1987, Kerry Stokes sold CTC to Northern Star Holdings, owners of Network Ten along with ADS Adelaide and the licence for NEW Perth. In Adelaide, ADS swapped frequencies later that year with Adelaide's then-Ten affiliate, SAS. CTC was already broadcasting on VHF 10 in the Tuggeranong Valley, Cooma and Goulburn (around a third of the potential audience), so a swap to VHF 10 wasn't viable. CTC would continue to be known as Capital 7 for another 18 months.

In 1988, CTC's programming began to evolve closer to Ten stations while still airing content from all three networks. In January Nine's Today Show was replaced with Network Ten's Good Morning Australia. Perhaps in an attempt to ingratiate local viewers lamenting the loss of the Today Show, on Monday 22 February, hosts Kerri-Anne Kennerley and Tim Webster broadcast a full episode of Good Morning Australia live from the front of New Parliament House in Canberra. At this time the half hour evening news was re-branded Eyewitness News. In September Eyewitness News launched a new a one-hour bulletin, bringing it in to line with the rest of the network.

At the same time CTC was preparing its launch in the Illawarra. Premises had been leased in Wollongong and a sales office and newsroom were being established. Capital 7 though would not be an appropriate name for the station; CTC wasn't going to supply Seven Network programming after all, so retaining the channel 7 moniker would have presented an anomaly. By the end of 1988 the news was branded Ten News and with that the station name Capital 7 disappeared and Capital Television had arrived; CTC's new identity emulated that of its new sister stations TEN Sydney, ATV Melbourne, TVQ Brisbane, ADS Adelaide and NEW Perth. The X logo was adopted denominated with Capital Television in place of TEN used for the other network stations. Network promos remained branded as TEN and the station began to be known locally as 'Capital 10'.

On 1 January 1989 CTC commenced daily 24-hour broadcasting for the first time. A revelation to Canberrans for whom television had ceased shortly after midnight each evening, not commencing until 6am the following day. Now armed with Network Ten's stream of programs and branding, CTC was able to stay on the air all night, taking a feed from Sydney for the midnight-dawn shift.

CTC was in a relatively strong position in Canberra ahead of aggregation, which would see the station expand into the Illawarra, Central West and Riverina. CTC had a 24-hour schedule, a strong investment in equipment and infrastructure and a loyal viewership.

On Friday 31 March 1989, CTC launched its Illawarra service and rivals Prime and WIN came to Canberra. A new base had been established in Wollongong for sales and news staff. CTC broadcast its Canberra-based news bulletin to the Illawarra seven days a week, with a window for local stories created for both markets. It would be another nine months before aggregation was complete in the Riverina and Central West, as the new transmitters required to cover these vast regions were still under construction by the Federal Government.

By the middle of 1989 Ten's ratings were in decline so on 23 July, the recently recruited network boss Bob Shanks relaunched the network as 10 TV Australia. Rumours had been circulating that Shanks wanted rid of the network's X logo, as it reminded him on X-rated movies. CTC became 10 TV Australia with the local branding "CAPITAL" in place of the city name used in the metropolitan markets. The X logo was gone, replaced with a map of Australia. The following day, news services within Network Ten were retro-branded Eyewitness News, everywhere except Canberra. The Ten News brand had been far more successful in Canberra than elsewhere, so the station was give a 'stay of execution' in order to re-introduce Eyewitness News at a time appropriate to the audience.

Meanwhile, owners Northern Star Holdings were having financial and regulatory problems. The company was subject to an inquiry by the Australian Broadcasting Tribunal in relation to media ownership rules and had run into financial difficulties following the 1987 stock market crash two years earlier. On 1 September 1989, Northern Star Holdings announced a major restructure to pay off debts and help restore profitability. The proposals included selling off the network's three smaller stations; ADS Adelaide, NEW Perth and CTC Canberra to Charles Curran's Capital Television Group. The sale was complete on 27 October 1989, effectively splitting Northern Star's Network Ten in half and ending CTC's brief stint as a fully fledged member of Network Ten.

In December 1989, following the station's takeover by Curran, CTC's Wollongong newsroom was significantly scaled back, just eight months into its operation. The local news windows were removed from the nightly bulletin as two journalists and two camera operators were retrenched. A local news presence was never established for CTC's Riverina and Central West signals, which were coming online at that time.

=== 1990s – A Capital idea ===
On 15 July 1990, CTC ceased 24-hour broadcasting in Canberra, after only one year. The station would go off air at 1:30 am.

The financial difficulties continued for Northern Star Holdings and on 14 September 1990 Network Ten, which by then consisted only of TEN Sydney, ATV Melbourne and TVQ Brisbane, went into receivership. By this time the TV Australia moniker had all but disappeared from network branding. On 13 January 1991 TV Australia was replaced with the launch of The Entertainment Network, a backronym that repositioned the network toward a younger demographic. At this time CTC dropped Channel 10 branding in favour of Capital Television, the name of its parent company, except for the locally produced Ten News, which would retain the name for a further 12 months. The station took on an original ribbon logo for Capital Television reminiscent of the iconic Capital 7 flag of the 1980s. The station ID was a modified version of The Entertainment Network identity of Network Ten.

By 1993 Charles Curran was planning to expand his regional television holdings in NSW and bid to buy NRTV. The move could have trebled the reach of Capital Television in the state taking in Newcastle, Coffs Harbour and Taree. Curran was unsuccessful and NRTV was bought by a consortium made up of Jack Cowin, Kerry Stokes and Telecasters North Queensland. With little opportunity to expand his regional television holdings, Curran sold CTC to Southern Cross Broadcasting in December 1994, retaining ADS Adelaide and NEW Perth.

CTC's new owners, Southern Cross were quick to rationalise resources at CTC, much as they had done at their existing stations in Victoria. By early 1995 staff cuts had been announced, the local weekend news bulletin had been cancelled and on 6 February CTC was rebranded Ten Capital in a move that would eliminate resources required to rebadge Network Ten station promos and IDs. Just five years earlier the station had been known colloquially as Capital 10. CTC re-commenced 24-hour broadcasting at this time.

=== 2000s – A Star is born ===
On 22 November 2001, following a year of rapid growth, Southern Cross cancelled the station's one-hour weekday news bulletin ending 40 years of local news production. CTC was rebranded Southern Cross Ten in 2002 as the company had acquired Ten affiliate stations in North Queensland from Telecasters Australia and all Ten stations, including CTC, were brought into line with the generic Southern Cross Ten brand. The branding was light, with a simple denominator below the Network Ten logo. For viewers, CTC was for the first time a 100% relay of TEN Sydney, with the only differentiator the insertion of local advertisements and the occasional local weather update.

In 2004 Southern Cross Ten was forced to reintroduce local news content following a ruling by the Australian Broadcasting Authority. The CTC studios in Watson became a news hub, with a small team of journalists pre-recording news updates to be broadcast across the Southern Cross Ten network.

In 2005 the Southern Cross Ten Star arrived on screen differentiating the regional stations more clearly from metropolitan Network Ten. Southern Cross Ten continued to largely use Network Ten IDs and promos unchanged, but mixed in Southern Cross Ten versions of network IDs. Community Service Announcements and local news updates were branded with the Southern Cross Ten Star.

The station celebrated 50 years on the air in Canberra on 2 June 2012.

=== 2016 – The switch to Channel 9 ===
On 1 July 2016, Southern Cross changed its programming alliance from Network Ten to the Nine Network in Canberra, southern NSW, Victoria and Queensland as part of a five-year agreement. CTC, along with almost all Southern Cross Ten stations rebranded as Channel 9 ending a 27-year affiliation with Ten. (In Northern NSW Southern Cross Ten continued its Ten affiliation due to Nine owning their existing station, NBN). The change was reminiscent of the 'frequency swap' between ADS and SAS Adelaide in 1987 which became Channel 10 and Channel 7 respectively. CTC is the only television station in Australia that has been known as Channel 7, Channel 9 and Channel 10.

=== 2017 – Demolition of Watson studios proposed ===
In December 2016, Southern Cross Austereo lodged a planning application with the ACT Government to demolish the CTC studios, administration and playout facility to make way for a residential development. The proposed studio campus demolition comes just over a year after WIN Television closed its Canberra studios at Kingston, moving its offices to the industrial suburb of Fyshwick. The trend of vast television estates making way for residential developments has been seen in Sydney, Melbourne and Perth. In 2009 however, a planned redevelopment of the original ATV studios at Nunawading in Melbourne was cancelled due to a slump in property prices.

In September 2018, Southern Cross Austereo announced it would transfer its Canberra-based broadcast playout to NPC Media, a joint venture between the Nine and Seven Networks. CTC, via Southern Cross Austereo, would move remaining employees to a leased office facility in Canberra. The changes were expected to be completed by 30 June 2020.

=== 2020 – Demolition of Watson studios ===
In August 2020, demolition of the entire CTC and Southern Cross Austereo studio site at Watson was completed to make way for a housing development. The demolition marked the end of 46 years as Canberra's home of television and Australia's first colour television station.

=== 2021 – Switch back to Network 10 programming ===
On 12 March 2021, Nine announced that it would return to WIN Television as its regional affiliate in most markets beginning on 1 July 2021, in a deal that would last at least seven years. This has ended SCA's five-year agreement with the Nine Network. On 25 June 2021, SCA and Network 10 announced a two-year affiliation deal in regional Queensland, which is serviced by the station TNQ, Southern NSW, which is serviced by this station, CTC, and regional Victoria, which is serviced by the stations GLV and BCV, which introduced 10 Shake to regional areas, including Southern NSW and the ACT, for the very first time and it broadcasts on Channel 54, as well as Sky News Regional which launched on 1 August 2021 and it broadcasts on Channel 56. On this station and on the whole network, Aspire TV ceased to broadcast on 31 July 2021, to accommodate Sky News Regional.

=== 2024 – Network 10 resumes ownership ===
On 17 December 2024, Southern Cross Austereo announced the sale of their regional television licenses in Regional Queensland, Southern NSW/ACT and Regional Victoria over to their affiliate Network 10. The sale was completed on 1 March 2025.

== Programming ==
As the only commercial television station in Canberra, CTC's programming operated independently from the television networks from its inception in 1962 until television aggregation in 1989 – though many viewers noticed CTC began to evolve towards the Ten Network schedule in early 1988 after the station was bought by the network. Independence meant CTC was free to choose programs from any source and the station claimed for many years that over 80% of Australia's top rating programs were broadcast in Canberra. However, local residents would often complain of big name television programs missing from the Canberra schedule, while cheap repeats of American sitcoms such as Bewitched and Gilligan's Island were staples until the late 1980s.

The popular Nine Network variety program Hey Hey It's Saturday was never broadcast by CTC nor were lifestyle program Burke's Backyard, game show Wheel of Fortune or the Seven Network dramas Sons and Daughters and Home & Away. The original Seven Network series of Neighbours aired from May to December 1985 in one-hour double episodes on Wednesdays at 7:30 pm, however only around 50 of the original 170 episodes were broadcast in Canberra at that time. Neighbours returned unceremoniously 18 months later to CTC on 1 June 1987 at 5:30 pm weeknights.

A Country Practice also aired on the station as did fellow Australian soap operas Prisoner, E Street, Richmond Hill and The Sullivans, current affairs programs 60 Minutes, Willesee, children's fantasy drama series Ocean Girl and H_{2}O: Just Add Water, science program Beyond 2000, quiz show Sale of the Century and medical drama The Flying Doctors. CTC was an early adopter of the raunchy 0–10 Network dramas Number 96 and The Box, screening both programs from their inception (1972 and 1974 respectively).

== News and current affairs ==
CTC has a long and rich history of quality local news and current affairs production. News bulletins aired for almost 40 years until being axed on 22 November 2001. The news format varied over the years but from the early 1970s was a separate 10–20 minute local bulletin followed by national news taken from ATN 7 in Sydney. In 1980, under new owner Kerry Stokes, CTC scaled up its local news bulletin to 30 minutes at 6pm on weekdays, followed by Seven National News from Sydney. In October 1981 CTC launched its first one-hour local, national and international bulletin, airing at 6pm weeknights presented by Laurie Wilson and John Bok. By 1982, John Bok was presenting alongside Laurie Wilson and Australian Capital News was also airing for 30 minutes on weekends.

1982 also saw a big change for CTC's morning newscasting with the introduction of weekday breakfast news television. CTC began broadcasting the Nine Network's National News Today (which would become the National Today Show on 28 June of that year) presented by Canberra broadcasting veteran Steve Liebmann at 7am weekdays. Perhaps in a nod to his local Canberra profile, CTC opted to broadcast Nine's breakfast program rather Network Ten's Good Morning Australia which had been on air for over a year and was preferred by most regional stations. The first time the station was broadcasting regularly before 9am was 15 years earlier with the locally produced Breakfast at Seven.

By 1985 the CTC newsroom boasted 14 journalists, 3 sports journalists and a sports presenter. The nightly bulletin also had the luxury of three camera operators during transmission. On 10 January 1986 John Bok, who had become a high-profile personality for CTC in the Canberra community, read his last bulletin to take up a role with ABC in Adelaide. David Allen took over as the station's chief news anchor as the bulletin was scaled down to a half-hour composite, which at that time was using the Nine Network news theme and graphics.

Having acquired CTC in 1987, Network Ten began an overhaul of the news service. Ken Begg was appointed News Director, joining from ABC replacing Bill Muldrew, with the clear brief to 'make the news better'. The Nine Network graphics and news theme were ditched and the bulletin was rebranded Eyewitness News aligning with the rest of the network and a late night locally produced half-hour current affairs program called This Week commenced, hosted by David Allen and Niree Creed. The program aired at 10.30pm Thursday evenings and boasted 'international content' which at the time was a point worth making owing to the expensive satellite equipment required to air news from overseas.

In January 1988 CTC's programming began to more closely emulate that of Network Ten. Nine's Today Show, which CTC had broadcast on weekday mornings for nearly six years, was replaced with Ten's Good Morning Australia from 18 January, while National Nine Morning News gave way to Ten Eyewitness News This Morning. The rebadged Capital 7 Eyewitness News adopted Turn to News by Frank Gari as the title track to its broadcasts, following the lead of TVQ-0 in Brisbane.

=== Face to Face ===
In August 1988 Network Ten launched its own Sunday morning political news program Face to Face. Hosted by then Political Editor for the network, Kerry O'Brien, Face to Face had an identical set at CTC Canberra, ATV Melbourne and TEN Sydney with the program broadcast from whichever city the main guest was in at the time. Face to Face would run until 1989 and was the first national program to be produced and broadcast from CTC.

=== The News Hour Returns ===
On Monday 19 September 1988 CTC's new one-hour Eyewitness News bulletin went to air at 6pm – just in time to cover day two of the Seoul Olympics. The relaunched newscast was hosted by veteran ABC newscaster Geoff Hiscock and TV8's Christine Kininmonth alongside weather presenter Mike Larkan and sports presenter Greg Robson. The team would steer CTC through the impending launch of two rival commercial stations which would see the viewing audience split into three within six months. A new set was constructed at the CTC studios in Watson in the same style as other Network Ten stations. During construction the news had been temporarily broadcast from Black Mountain Tower.

By December 1988 the bulletin had been re-branded Ten News and CTC was a fully fledged Network Ten station in time for the arrival of Prime and WIN in Canberra and ready to take on those rivals in the Illawarra. Similar to the structure of CTC's Nine News today, the bulletin had a local opt-out window for the Illawarra, where stories produced from CTC's Wollongong base would be inserted. This format lasted barely nine months, with the Wollongong news crew retrenched in December 1989 following the September takeover of CTC by Charles Curran. Riverina and Central West viewers had only just begun to receive CTC and a local news presence was never established.

The station's commitment to metropolitan quality news in Canberra saw CTC defy other Network Ten affiliates in Australia, maintaining a number one position in the ratings for three years after Prime and WIN commenced broadcasting in that city. The one-hour locally produced bulletin would remain on screens almost unchanged for 13 years.

=== The First at Five Failure ===
Following suit with the rest of Network Ten, CTC moved its 6pm Ten Evening News bulletin to 5pm, renaming the program Capital Eyewitness News, on 20 January 1992. The 'First at Five' slogan was emblazoned across Canberra on buses and in newspaper ads. The move to 5pm gave Network Ten an edge in other cities against its rival news bulletins. In Canberra there were no other local/national/international bulletins on air, but the half-hour 6pm local news on rival WIN was proving popular. However, in both a testament to the loyalty of its audience and a question mark over the wisdom of management, the 'First at Five' move was met with fierce protest by viewers. Not only had the beloved 'Channel 7 News' as it was colloquially known been moved an hour earlier, but the 6pm-7pm slot had been filled by the tabloid current affairs program Hinch and the low-budget American dating show Studs. Canberra was having none of it and CTC restored the bulletin to 6pm after just six weeks. Bus ads were hastily amended with stickers covering the timeslot noting the news was 'First at Six'.

For CTC's markets outside of Canberra, things were a little different. The Illawarra, Central West and Riverina received news from TEN-10 in Sydney, rather than the Canberra bulletin. For these markets the news remained at 5pm for the next 24 years until the affiliation change to Nine. On 1 July 2021, when the affiliation was changed back to 10, the news moved back to 5pm.

=== The 1993 Canberra TV News War ===
Four years after aggregation, Prime, which had had a stop/start approach to local news in Canberra, decided to take on CTC head-to-head with a one-hour local/national/international 6pm news bulletin. Prime's first attempt at news in Canberra saw the station lure CTC alumnus John Bok back from Adelaide in 1989 to produce and front a 30-minute local news bulletin. However, Prime couldn't drag the audience from CTC and in April 1991 the bulletin was scaled back to a five-minute update shown at the end of Seven Nightly News from Sydney.

In 1993 Prime decided to try again and a team of 26 including Ken Begg and Geoff Hiscock, both poached from CTC, were brought together to upgrade Prime's news. The now nationally known faces of Melissa Doyle and Jessica Rowe would also join Prime's news team. Meanwhile, as Capital received a new news director of John Stock from QTQ, sports presenter Greg Robson took over from Hiscock anchoring Capital Eyewitness News at CTC alongside Kininmonth. WIN maintained its half-hour local news bulletin anchored by veteran Canberra broadcaster Peter Leonard. Prime's 6 O'clock News commenced on 1 March 1993 amid a high-profile advertising campaign. For the first time since aggregation, viewers had the choice of three locally produced television 6pm news bulletins, two of which were composite local, national and international.

1993 would go down in history as the pinnacle of local TV choice for Canberra, with buses and newspapers plastered with the faces of three newsrooms. But it wasn't to last and by Christmas 1993 Prime had scaled back its one-hour composite to a half-hour local bulletin. Capital Eyewitness News prevailed as the number one news program followed by fierce rival WIN.

=== 1995 – The beginning of the end ===
Soon after CTC was purchased by Southern Cross Broadcasting (as it was then known), the newsroom was subject to extensive staff cuts. The cancellation of the half-hour weekend bulletin was the most obvious sign things were changing. In Canberra, the news was re-branded Ten Capital Eyewitness News, encapsulating the station's rebrand.

Over the next five years, limited resources were invested into the newsroom and technical glitches were becoming more obvious to viewers. Ten year old camera tapes were having to be reused with tape wear showing on screen. Sound desks from the early 1970s were also beginning to fail leading to breaks in audio on-air. Despite the lack of investment in technical equipment, the CTC newsroom maintained its selection of local and national stories and broad coverage of international news.

By May 1997, the bulletin had simplified its name to Ten Capital News. The 1990s had been a decade of soft ratings for Network Ten and the legacy of CTC's 'Channel 7' glory days had long been forgotten. Owners Southern Cross Broadcasting tapped the final nail in the coffin of the locally produced news bulletin on 22 November 2001 blaming declining audience and the expense of upgrading equipment for digital broadcasting. The axing, in the same year as Prime cancelled its half-hour local bulletin in Canberra, sparked an Australian Broadcasting Authority investigation into regional television news. No news bulletins were restored as a result.

Local news was re-introduced to the station in 2004 in the form of three-minute updates at various times of the day. The news updates were produced by Southern Cross News and aired from the CTC Canberra studios. A local half-hour magazine program called State Focus also commenced production at this time to contribute to minimum local content rules. At the time of its debut, State Focus aired on Saturdays at noon. State Focus later aired on Sunday mornings before Meet the Press.

From the end of 2001 CTC aired the one-hour weekday state and half-hour weekend national 10 News First bulletins from TEN Sydney at 5 pm. CTC would later carry The Project and The Bolt Report. State level and national news updates from TEN Sydney were also broadcast.

=== 2016 – Nine News Hour ===
On 1 July 2016, Southern Cross Austereo changed its on-air affiliation deal for its Southern Cross Ten stations to align with the Nine Network. CTC broadcast daily national Nine News Canberra bulletins produced in Sydney as well as its flagship Sydney-based bulletin on weekends, A Current Affair, Today Extra, national and state updates. Two programs returned to CTC under the affiliation deal, Today re-commenced on air for the first time since 1987 as well as 60 Minutes which was last broadcast by CTC in 1988.

Locally produced news updates continued on CTC after the change to Channel 9, however owners Southern Cross Austereo announced they would 'scale up' the three-minute 'rip and read' news updates with the re-introduction of full news bulletins at the earliest opportunity ending years of dependence on national and state newscasts.

In November 2016 the Nine Network announced it would commence production of 15 localised news bulletins including a one-hour service for Canberra. While journalists would be based at the CTC offices in Watson, the bulletin would read from TCN studios in Sydney, contrary to earlier speculation the Watson news studios would be brought back to life. The weather segment was pre-recorded at NBN in Newcastle.

Former ABC weather presenter Vanessa O'Hanlon was announced as the anchor for the service at the Nine Network's 2017 program launch. On 18 January 2017, News Director Mike Dalton announced the first bulletin reporters for CTC in 15 years as Harry Frost and Rosana Kingsun (both from WIN News Canberra), Emma Larouche (from GTS/BKN Southern Cross News presented from Canberra) and Mike Lorigan (NBN News Central Coast).

On 6 February 2017 the first edition of Nine News Canberra went to air. The bulletin was produced in the same way as NBN News in Newcastle, where a generic bulletin framework was read live, with windows for pre-recorded local news, sport and weather. The Nine News Canberra bulletin framework was shared with the Illawarra, Riverina and Central West markets, each with its own local content windows. The shared weather segment for Canberra/Illawarra was pre-recorded at NBN studios in Newcastle. The historic first broadcast marked a return to local news for the station after 15 years.

On 17 March 2020, following the outbreak of coronavirus, Nine News announced the temporary cancellation of their regional, hour-long news bulletins.

=== 2020 – Nine News Local ===
Localised news bulletins returned to CTC on Monday 10 August 2020, with some major changes. The bulletin was cut to a 30-minute program covering the ACT and all of southern NSW (Illawarra, Riverina and Central West) in one broadcast. Airing live at 5.30pm, the bulletin was followed by the state edition of Nine News at 6 pm.

Former news reporter Natassia Soper took over from Vanessa O'Hanlon reading news and sport with Mike Lorigan relocating to Nine News Adelaide. Weather continued to be presented by Gavin Morris from the NBN studios in Newcastle, covering the entire broadcast area.

=== 2021 – 10 News First and Sky News agreement ===
Following the announcement that SCA would switch its affiliation back to Channel 10 from 1 July 2021, due to Nine switching back to WIN Television on the same day, the Nine News Local bulletins ceased production after 5 years with the last bulletin airing on 30 June 2021, due to Nine affiliate WIN operating its own local news service. This marked the end of locally produced news bulletins again for CTC after 5 years with no plans to continue local news bulletins under Network 10 affiliation - and under its renewed Network 10 direct ownership in 2025 and onwards. CTC returned to rip and read news updates on 1 July 2021, the same day that SCA began its new affiliation with Network 10. The news updates carry the 10 News First look and feel with the updates produced from the network's station in Hobart. Apart from updates CTC carries 10 News First from Sydney (state bulletins on weekdays, national bulletins on weekends), The Project and The Sunday Project. CTC also used to broadcast the mid morning program Studio 10, until it was axed in November 2023.

In May 2021, SCA reached a content agreement with Sky News Australia, under which it would distribute the new free-to-air Sky News Regional beginning 1 August 2021, on SCA's 10 stations, including CTC. The service is a de facto replacement for the Sky News on WIN service that it previously distributed. With that agreement CTC has access to the Sky News Australia newsroom and remote studios based in the capital for production of news content broadcast on the Sky News network of channels around the country and is the lead station for SNA regional broadcasts during special events like elections and others in the state level and nationally. In addition it is the defacto FTA lead channel that airs select Fox Sports News broadcasts for the SNR regional stations nationwide from its Artarmon studios, beaming sporting content with a regional and national focus.

When CTC returned to Network 10 ownership in 2025, the SNR studios became the basis of a renewed 10 News subbureau of the Sydney state studio for national news stories from the ACT beamed on the wider network nationwide and in the state level 5pm broadcasts.

In 2026, Sky News Regional was rebranded into News24 Regional as part of a wider rebrand of the Sky News Australia operations and the end of its licensing of the Sky News brand by News Corp.

=== Presenters ===
==== Current presenters ====
- Will Boddy (fill-in presenter for 10 News updates since July 2022)
- Rebecca Gaitaneris (presenter for 10 News updates since March 2023)

==== Former presenters ====
- Natassia Soper (news from 2020–2021)
- Gavin Morris (weather from 2017–2021)
- Vanessa O'Hanlon (news from 2017–2020)
- Mike Lorigan (sport from 2017–2020)
- Jared Coote (news updates from 2015 until 2016, then worked at Fox Sports News from 2016 until 2019, now works at the Australian Broadcasting Corporation)
- Amy La Porte
- Ali Drower (State Focus and news updates)
- Greg Robson (sport from 1988 until 1993, then news from 1993 until 2001)
- Penelope Heath
- Pepita Bulloch
- Andrea Close
- Peter Champan (sport from 1993 until December 1998)
- Virginia Nicholls (news from 1993 until 1995)
- Mike Larkan (weather from 1988 until 1996)
- Christine Kininmonth (news from 1988 until 1993)
- Geoff Hiscock (news from 1988 until 1992)
- Mal Grieve
- Frank Jones
- David Brice
- Matthew Eggins (sport from December 1998 until November 2001)
- Karen Barlin
- Laurie Wilson (foreign editor from 1974 until 1981; news from 1981 until November 1983)
- Janine Bennett (news from 1998 until 1999)
- John Bok (news from 1981 until January 1986)
- Karen Milliner (news from 1985 to 1987)
- David Allen (news from 1986 to 1988)
- Niree Creed (news from 1983 to 1989)
- Sonja Allitt
- Rosemary Church (weather and news from 1989 until April 1990, now works at CNN International)
- Amber Sherlock (News updates & State Focus, now at Nine Entertainment)
- Kathryn Robinson (news updates and State Focus, now at Australian Broadcasting Corporation)
- Brett Mason (news updates, now part of Anthony Albanese's media team)
- Amanda Abate (news updates, now at the Seven Network for Seven News Gold Coast)
- Fiona Nelson (news updates)
- Stefanie Wacklawik
- Alexandra Bryant (news updates, still works for Southern Cross Austereo in radio)
- Wilhelmina Lyffyt
- Julie Snook (now at Nine Entertainment)
- Sophie Jacobsen (presenter for 10 News First news updates from July 2021 until January 2022)
- Ruby Cairns (presenter for 10 News First news updates from January 2022 until August 2023)

=== Reporters ===
==== Former reporters ====
- Harry Frost
- Emma Larouche
- Rosana Kingsun
- Natassia Apolloni
- Rebecca Davis (sports reporter)
- Kimberley Caines
- Richard Dudley
- Craig Allen
- Mark Corcoran
- Jeremy Flynn
- Andrew Messenger
- Anthony Robertson
- Suzanne Mostyn
- Donna Cole
- Jo Mazzochi
- Stephen Taylor
- Craig Norenbergs

== Entertainment programs ==
=== An Evening With ===
An Evening With was a variety program which aired from 1966 to 1967. Co-produced by Jack Sluyters and David Brice, who was also the host, An Evening With was broadcast monthly featuring both Canberra-based and interstate talent. The first episode went to air at 9.30pm on Tuesday 23 August 1966 and was entitled An Evening With Treblefolk, a local trio formed by Brian Triglone who is still involved in folk music in Canberra today. Little Pattie appeared as the main performer in a 1967 episode.

=== Breakfast At Seven ===
In May 1967 CTC commenced a two-hour light entertainment, news and community information program. Presented by newsreader and announcer David Brice, the program aired on Saturday mornings at 7am and included music, film clips from entertainment shows, weather reports, sport, gardening, cartoons and previews of programs for the night's viewing.

=== Tonight in Canberra ===
Tonight in Canberra was a short-lived series which aired in 1968 from April to August on Mondays at 10.05 pm. The series presented a mix of interviews and variety acts. It was hosted by David Brice, who was assisted by Steve Liebmann. The content varied in entertainment quality with one episode featuring an interview with Christmas card designer Gordon Fraser and an interview with an inspector for the RSPCA while a different episode featured an interview with NSW Minister for Lands, Tom Lewis, and an interview with chairman of the ACT Advisory Council, Jim Pead.

While working for CTC, presenter David Brice optioned the rights of a book by Don and Elizabeth Coleman about a student protest against an Asian security conference to be held in Canberra. Demonstrator commenced filming in September 1970. The film was released the following year and achieved some success in Canberra but was a commercial and critical disappointment.

=== Tonight with Frank Jones ===
Tonight with Frank Jones was a revival of the variety show format produced at CTC, airing on Saturday nights at 9.30pm in the mid-1970s.

=== Meeting in the Middle ===
Meeting in the Middle was an innovative early Sunday evening chat show hosted by Canberra teenagers that ran for 26 weeks from 17 June 1979. Teenagers interviewed celebrities asking questions they devised themselves. The show was the brain child of Desmond Bishop, who ran the Canberra Children's Television Workshop at CTC and aimed 'to bridge the generation gap'.

=== Constable Kenny on Duty ===
In the 1980s Constable Kenny on Duty was essential viewing, appearing during the afternoon program Children's Hour. Alongside the ever grumpy Sergeant Bully, Kenny would teach Canberra boys and girls important life lessons, such as how to cross the road safely. The program also included trips to the local zoo and letters from viewers. Constable Kenny had previously appeared in a few programs including Constable Kenny's Casebook and Junior Police 7.

=== RPM ===
Motoring program RPM, which stood for road test, performance, maintenance, started a 13 week run on Wednesday 10 July 1985 following a pilot shot in February that year. In a testament to the stations ability to syndicate its production, the show was pre-sold to 'every regional station in Australia, except NBN-3'. Initially the program was to be hosted by The Canberra Times motoring editor Paul Gover, however by the time the show launched he had stepped aside due to 'other commitments' and motoring editor of The Sunday Telegraph, Will Hagon, was given the gig. Network Ten would revive the RPM name 12 years later for an automotive and motorsports series.

=== Rock Till Dawn ===
In 1985 CTC followed the trend of metropolitan stations and introduced a midnight till dawn music video program, Rock Till Dawn. The program premiered on Friday, 22 March 1985 and was presented by radio 2CA personality Ron Cooper. Initially running on Friday nights, the show had a 'backbone of rock 'n' roll', but included pop music and jazz. The program featured studio performances, interviews as well as standard music videos. A clip of Rock Till Dawn can be seen today featuring the Doug Anthony All Stars in which host Cooper incorrectly refers to the studio location as Dickson, when in fact he was further up Northbourne Avenue in Watson.

=== Saturday Morning Live ===
Hosted by radio 2CC duo Donna Lynch and Cameron Humphries with Rowdy Rabbit, Saturday Morning Live ran for an hour at 8.30am from 12 October 1985 to 21 December that year. Based on the popular Hey Hey It's Saturday, which at the time was a morning children's show, Saturday Morning Live featured good news stories of the week, some cartoon content and music. Rowdy Rabbit was the popular mascot of the South Canberra shopping centre, and program sponsor, Woden Shopping Square (now Westfield Woden) who had 3,000 fan club members in 1984.

=== The Up-Late Game Show ===
In 2005 the first regular, nationally broadcast TV program in 16 years was produced at CTC studios in Canberra. The Up-Late Game Show was a 90-minute late night interactive television quiz program shown across Network Ten, written and hosted by Big Brother contestant Simon Deering, commonly known by the nickname Hotdogs. The show's format had the host presenting simple puzzles which viewers could attempt to solve over the phone. Successfully solving a puzzle would result in a cash prize for the contestant. The program had two series and went to air for the final time on Friday 15 December 2006.

== Community and sport ==
CTC's Community Billboard was synonymous with early evening viewing in Canberra in the 1970s and 1980s. Read by a member of the news team, Community Billboard was a five-minute presentation of upcoming not-for-profit community events around Canberra. In March 1988, after the station was acquired by Network Ten the previous year, Community Billboard was scaled back to three minutes so it could run within commercial breaks during the day. The mini-program ran on CTC from November 1962 until December 1988 when the format was adopted by local rivals WIN and Prime and subsequently dropped by CTC.

In the 1970s and 1980s CTC's weekend schedule was heavily padded with local and national sport coverage. A two-hour program Sports Action dominated the schedule on Saturday afternoons (originally on Sunday afternoons from 5 May 1968 at a noon to 2pm time slot hosted by Rex Mossop), showing a selection of sporting events from around the country. Sports Action was revived as Sportswatch on 13 March 1983 with Tony Campbell as host. With only one commercial television station in Canberra, whether to show AFL or Rugby League matches was always a hotly contentious issue.

The Canberra Birdman Rally broadcast by CTC from 1985 to 1994 during the Canberra Festival in March was possibly the most visible community event run by the station. At its peak in 1987, over 100,000 spectators would line Lake Burley Griffin to watch contestants jump from a 10-metre platform, aiming to glide 50 metres to win the $10,000 prize. The 1995 Birdman rally event was cancelled by the station as it could "no longer sustain the high costs of staging the event".

== Main transmitters ==
Region served	City	Channels (Analog/ Digital)	First air date	ERP (Analog/ Digital)	HAAT (Analog/ Digital) (Note: HAAT estimated from https://www.itu.int/SRTM3/ using EHAAT.)	Transmitter Coordinates	Transmitter Location
Canberra	Canberra	7 (VHF) (Note: Analogue transmissions ceased as of 5 June 2012 as part of the national shutdown of analogue television); 6 (VHF)	2 June 1962	200 kW; 50 kW	345 m 335 m	35°16′32″S 149°5′52″E	Black Mountain
Central Tablelands	Orange	33 (UHF); 38 (UHF)	30 December 1989	2000 kW; 350 kW	627 m 628 m	33°20′32″S 148°59′1″E (analog); 33°20′31″S 148°58′59″E (digital)	Mount Canobolas
Central Western Slopes	Dubbo	35 (UHF); 11 (VHF)	30 December 1989	1000 kW; 150 kW	648 m 653 m	31°20′32″S 149°1′22″E	Mount Cenn Cruaich
Illawarra	Wollongong	62 (UHF); 37 (UHF)	31 March 1989	950 kW; 250 kW	619 m 600 m	34°37′23″S 150°41′39″E (analog); 34°37′8″S 150°41′49″E (digital)	Knights Hill
South Western Slopes and Eastern Riverina	Wagga Wagga	35 (UHF); 51 (UHF)	30 December 1989	1600 kW; 350 kW	525 m 540 m	34°49′13″S 147°54′5″E	Mount Ulandra
Victorian Upper Murray (Upper Hume region)	Albury	39 (UHF); 8 (VHF)	1 January 1992	1200 kW; 60 kW	533 m 525 m	36°15′13″S 146°51′20″E	Mount Baranduda

== See also ==
- Regional television in Australia
- Network 10
