= The Flying Dogtor =

1962–1964 Australian animated TV series

- Genre: Animated series
- Created by: Robin Boyd
- Voices of: Roly Barlee
- Theme music composer: Horrie Dargie
- Country of origin: Australia
- Original language: English
- No. of episodes: 52

Production
- Producer: Hector Crawford
- Production company: Crawford Productions

Original release
- Network: Australian Television Network
- Release: 1962 – 1964

The Flying Dogtor is an early Australian animated television series made by Crawford Productions between 1962 and 1964. It was shown on the Australian Television Network, which later became the Seven Network.

Its central character is a Great Dane who conducts a medical practice by aeroplane in outback Australia, similar to the Royal Flying Doctor Service.

The series was devised and written by the leading Melbourne architect Robin Boyd.

== Characters ==
- The Great Dogtor Dane – the Flying Dogtor
- Granny Goanna
- Liz Lizard
- The bush children
  - Colin Kanga
  - Polly Possum
  - Katie Koala
- Crafty Carson Carpetbag – the sneaky snake from Steamy Swamp
- Elvis Eagle – the bodgie bird
- Old Man Redback

== Production ==
The show was produced by Hector Crawford. Cartoons were drawn by Joy Murray and Janice Male who studied together at Melbourne Technical College (now RMIT University). The cameraman was Ian Crawford. All characters' voices were read by Roly Barlee who was well known in Melbourne radio. Script and character advice was provided by Dr E.A. Murray, a lecturer in psychology, and Jean Lawson, a school counsellor.

The theme music was written and performed by Horrie Dargie and his quintet. Additional music came from a small 78 rpm record library, together with characters' voices, narration and some basic sound effects were added together to produce a master sound mix.

The animation technique was basically a moving plane running across the frame from left to right. The plane was about 5 in (13 cm) high made of thick high quality art paper. It was pulled through by an electric motor in a machine that was also designed and built by Robin Boyd.

== Episode list ==
52 episodes were produced in the series. Some of these are held in the National Film and Sound Archive, including:

1. The Great Doctor Dane
2. Crafty's Secret Hideout
3. Fire!
4. Fireworks
