= Katrina (talk show) =

Australian television talk show

- Genre: Talk show
- Presented by: Katrina Pye
- Country of origin: Australia
- Original language: English

Production
- Running time: 15 minutes

Original release
- Network: ATV-0
- Release: 1967

Katrina is an Australian television talk show aired on ATV-0 (now ATV-10 and part of Network 10) in Melbourne in 1967. Hosted by Katrina Pye, the talk show aired in a 15-minute time slot. Following the end of the series, Pye moved to another ATV-0 series, Chit-Chat.

Despite a considerable trend towards "national" series for prime-time shows, many Australian daytime shows remained single-city-only at the time. The archival status of the series is not known, and it is possible the series was wiped.
