= Jonathan Daly (disambiguation) =

Jonathan Daly may refer to:

- Jonathan Daly (born 1942), American actor
- Jon Daly (born 1977), American actor
- Jon Daly (footballer), (born 1983), Irish footballer
