= Roundabout (TV program) =

- Genre: Daytime television
- Presented by: Katrina Pye; Roy Hampson
- Country of origin: Australia
- Original language: English

Original release
- Network: ATV-0
- Release: 1967 – 1971

Roundabout (which debuted as Morning Magazine) is an Australian morning television program which aired from 1967 to 1971, when it was replaced with/became The Roy Hampson Show. It aired in Melbourne on what was then station ATV-0 (now ATV-10 and part of Network Ten). It evolved out of an earlier series called Chit-Chat.

It consisted of various segments and was a daytime talk show for women. Hosts of the series included Katrina Pye and Roy Hampson.
