= Horrie Dargie =

Australian musician (1917–1999)

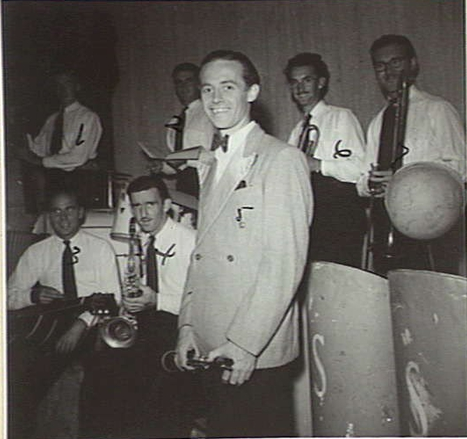
- Dargie performing with an Army swing band, Lae, New Guinea, July 1944
- Born: Horace Andrew Dargie; 7 July 1917; Footscray, Victoria, Australia
- Died: 30 August 1999 (aged 82); Sydney, New South Wales, Australia
- Occupations: Musician; television compère; talent manager; music label owner
- Years active: 1933–1980s
- Spouses: Julie Cheffirs (after 1940) Betty Glew (m. 1955; died 1972)
- Relatives: William Dargie (brother)
- Musical career
- Genres: Orchestral jazz; rock 'n' roll; pop
- Instruments: Harmonica; clarinet; saxophone; vocals
- Labels: Regal Zonophone; Columbia; Astor
- Formerly of: Rockin' Reeds; the Harlequintet; Horrie Dargie Quintet; the Dargies

Horace Andrew Dargie (7 July 1917 – 30 August 1999) was an Australian musician (harmonica, clarinet), television compère, talent manager, music label founder and music arranger. As a member of Horrie Dargie Quintet he was awarded the first gold record in Australia for their 10-inch live album, Horrie Dargie Concert (1952), which sold 75,000 copies. In the late 1950s and early 1960s he compèred TV variety programmes Personally Yours (1959), BP Super Show (1959–1962) and The Delo and Daly Show (1963–1964). Dargie co-produced teen pop music programme, The Go!! Show (1964–1967), and as well as organising its on-screen performers he established the related Go!! Records label to provide an outlet for artists' singles. He was inducted into the ARIA Hall of Fame in 1996. Dargie was married twice.

== Life and career ==
=== Early life ===
Horrie Dargie was born on 7 July 1917 in Footscray, Victoria, the second son of timber worker and clerk Andrew Dargie (c. 1878–1960) and schoolteacher Adelaide Mary Dargie (née Sargent, c. 1880–1969) – residents of Walhalla, Victoria. Dargie's paternal grandparents were Scottish and his maternal grandparents were residents of Footscray. His older brother Sir William Dargie (1912–2003) was an Australian portrait artist. The brothers were educated at the Walhalla State School (No. 957), Erica Primary School, City of Footscray including Kingsville Primary School and then in City of Williamstown.

Dargie had been given a harmonica by his father and, from the age of ten, he practised the instrument for five hours a day. A self-taught musician, at the age of 14 or 15, he was inspired by Larry Adler and learned to play Gershwin's "Rhapsody in Blue" from Adler's version. He left secondary school after completing intermediate standard and worked in a woollen mill. One of his brother's earliest portraits is of Dargie as The Young Recruit (1933).

=== Music career ===
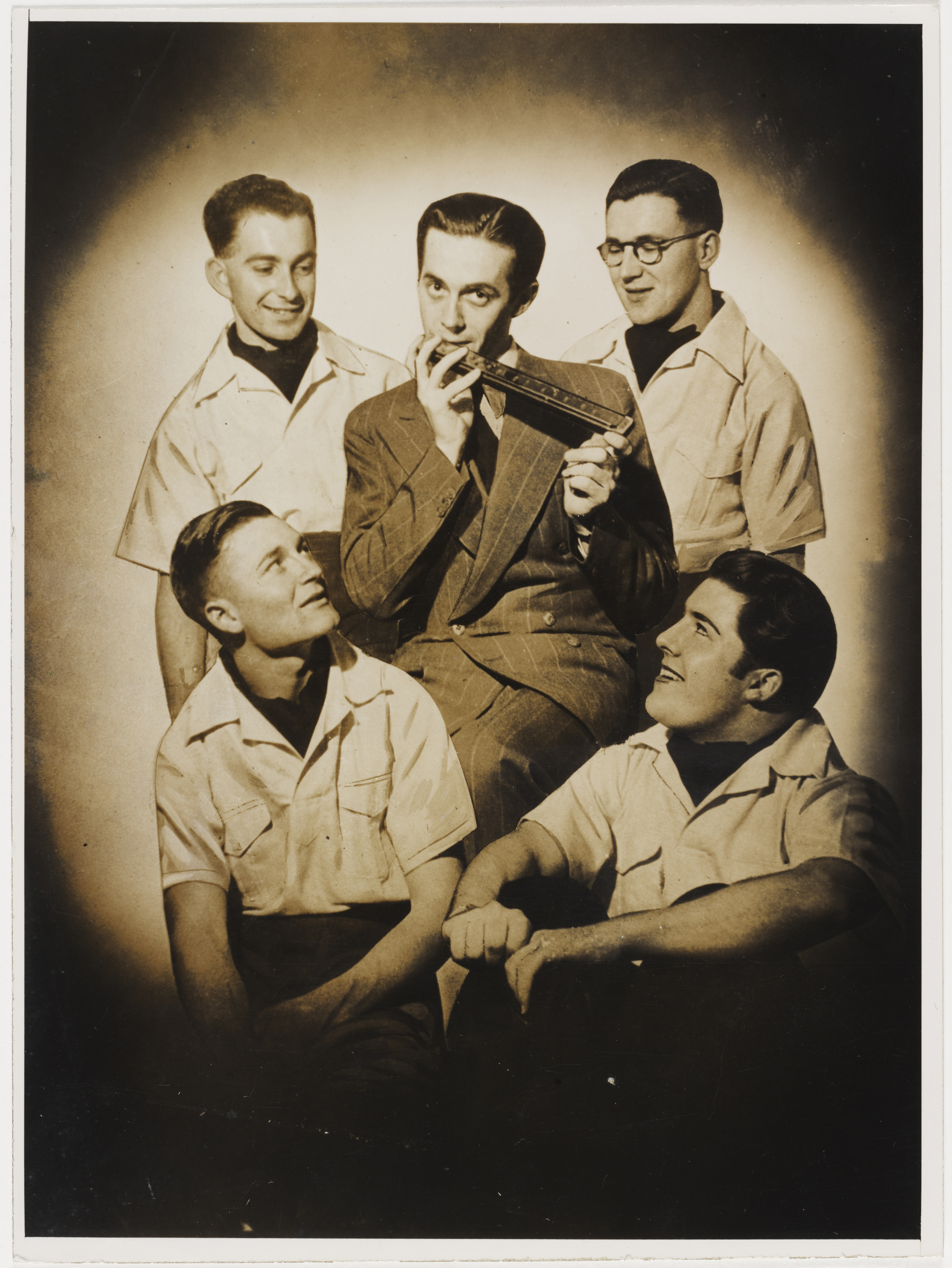
"Horrie Dargie and his boys". Dargie (centre) surrounded by Rockin' Reeds' members George Williamson, Henry "Doc" Bertram, Ron Metcalfe, Roy Shea

Dargie began his musical career as a diatonica harmonica player. At 16-years-old he joined the Yarraville Mouth Organ Band in July 1933, which practised in a shoe repair shop. Later he joined Victorian Mouth Organ Band conducted by William Ketterer. In the early 1930s Dargie took up the chromatic harmonica and won a variety competition for professional and amateurs, P&A Parade on a local radio station 3KZ in 1937. Australian Broadcasting Commission (ABC) hired him as a harmonica player to tour Australia for three months from November 1937. He started his tour in Tasmania and broadcast from a radio studio, which he preferred to concert halls as his effects are "concentrated in the one volume of sound, and not thinned by the spread of sound in a hall."

In February 1938 he joined ABC-sponsored Jim Davidson's Dance Band alongside hill-billy comedian Bobby Dyer on "an extended tour of capital cities and provincial centres." In March of that year they performed at Tivoli Theatre, Broken Hill. Some tour performances were broadcast on local radio stations. Dargie's first recording was with Davidson's orchestra in 1938, which was issued via Columbia Records.

After the tour Dargie moved to Sydney where he studied clarinet and orchestration, before starting his own harmonica school there. With Henry "Doc" Bertram on bass harmonica; Alec Lois, Ron Metcalfe and George Williamson on chromatics and Roy Shea on chords he formed a harmonica group, the Rockin' Reeds. The group released six recordings by 1941. From early March to late April 1942 Horrie Dargie and His Rockin' Reeds played a weekly programme on ABC radio.

=== Army service and return to music career ===
Dargie enlisted in the Australian Army's Entertainment Unit on 13 November 1942, where he became a Warrant Officer Class 2; he served in New Guinea (December 1943–September 1944), Darwin (May–July 1945) and in the occupational forces in Japan (March 1946–February 1947); he was discharged in March 1947 and returned to Sydney. While in New Guinea in July 1944, he was called up from the audience by Adler to perform "Stardust" at a concert for allied soldiers in Lae (see infobox photo). Besides Adler other performers were Jack Benny and Carole Landis.

He formed the Horrie Dargie Quintet (also known as the Horrie Dargie Harlequintet) in 1949. By 1952 the Quintet had risen in popularity and played their farewell concert at the Sydney Town Hall in November 1952 before leaving for England. The line-up of the quintet was Dargie on clarinet, harmonica, vocals; Bertram on bass, harmonica, vocals; Reg Cantwell on piano; Joe Hudson on drums, harmonica, vocals; Vern Moore on guitar, harmonica, vocals. By chance, a recording was made on a wire recorder using just one microphone – the 10-inch record of the performance, Horrie Dargie Concert (1953) became Australia's first gold record, selling 75,000 copies. Upon arrival in England the quintet performed at the Empire in London and an agent recognised the group's performance as unique due to their distinctive sound, humour and individual style.

While in England they appeared several times on television via BBC from 1953. The quintet's line-up, in January 1955, was Dargie (harmonica, clarinet, saxophone, vocals), Bertram (bass, harmonica), Cantwell (piano), Hudson (drums, harmonica) and Moore (saxophone, guitar, trombone, harmonica). One of their numbers "The Green Door" (1956) become a hit in its own right. Upon their return to Australia in 1958 they performed at the Tivoli, Sydney.

=== Television presenting and production ===
The quintet appeared on Stan Freberg Show in June 1959, which was filmed at ATN-7 studios, Epping. Dargie took up positions at the then-affiliated TV stations ATN-7 (Sydney) and GTV-9 (Melbourne), where he was in charge of the talent division – variety was popular at the time – he worked on four or five shows a week. He compèred BP Super Show (1959–1962), Personally Yours (1962) and The Delo and Daly Show (1963–1964) and organised on-air talent and guests. The latter programme was produced by DYT Productions, which had been established by Dargie with Arthur Young and Johnny Tillbrook. Dargie compèred the first nationwide-edition of The Price Is Right in 1963 on Seven Network, which had previously had rival versions in Melbourne (1958) and Sydney (1957–1958). By 1963 ATN-7 was affiliated with HSV-7 (Melbourne).

DYT Productions also produced The Go!! Show (1964–1967) for ATV-0 (Melbourne). It was a pop music show, which regularly featured solo entertainers Johnny Young, Ian Turpie and Olivia Newton-John. DYT Productions established the related Go!! Records in 1964 to promote artists, which appeared on the show; with distribution by Astor Records. In August 1967, ATV-0 abruptly cancelled The Go!! Show and the loss of its promotional outlet led to the demise of the Go!! label in the following year.

=== Musical arrangement ===
Dargie provided musical arrangements for film Crocodile Dundee and TV series The Leyland Brothers. Under the musical directorship of Sven Libaek, he also participated in the background music in the 1960s TV show Nature Walkabout (hosted by Vincent Serventy). Dargie played background music for TV series Skippy the Bush Kangaroo. One of Dargie's last recordings was for pop music group the Reels' third studio album, Beautiful (May 1982).

== Personal life ==
Horrie Dargie married Julie Babette Cheffirs (born 1918, Broken Hill) on 5 February 1940 in Sydney. A planned honeymoon to England was shelved due to the war. The couple had met in Broken Hill when Dargie performed there as a member of Jim Davidson's band. Prior to his enlistment the couple lived in Rose Bay. Dargie was discharged in March 1947 and returned home to his wife. By September of that year Dargie was working as a band leader at the Mountbatten Restaurant, Sydney. His wife, as Julie Dargie, wrote social commentary for newspapers, Broken Hill's The Barrier Miner (fl. 1945) and Melbourne's The Argus (fl. 1950–1951).

While performing in London in late 1955 Dargie contracted polio and was hospitalised – apparently he collapsed on stage. The disease affected his diaphragm and legs, at the time he was told he would not be able to play a wind instrument again. He once described the illness as a "bit of a problem" – he was paralysed except for his right arm and he could swallow. With persistence he recovered and returned to his music career by June of the following year.

Dargie married Winifred "Betty" Glew (born c.1915) in March 1955 in England, a former 1940s Tivoli dancer who had joined Folies Bergère in Paris in 1950. The couple had two daughters by the time they returned to Australia in April 1958. Both daughters were cabaret performers: individually and as the Dargie Sisters. Betty died of cancer in 1972 and a daughter died of cancer in 1997.

=== Death ===
Horrie Dargie died on 30 August 1999. He was survived by a daughter, grandchildren, his brother and family. One of Dargie's grandchildren, Betty Dargie, became a professional entertainer.

== Honours ==
=== ARIA Music Awards ===
The ARIA Music Awards is an annual awards ceremony that recognises excellence, innovation and achievement across all genres of Australian music. They commenced in 1987. Dargie was inducted into its hall of fame in 1996 in recognition of being the first Australian to achieve gold record status, the producer of The Go!! Show and his work as music arranger on Robbery Underarms and Crocodile Dundee 2.

Year	Nominee / work	Award	Result
1996	Horrie Dargie	ARIA Hall of Fame	inductee

== Discography ==
=== Albums ===
- Horrie Dargie Concert (by Horrie Dargie Harlequintet) (live, February 1953) Diaphon
- The Best Man and Other Titles (by Horrie Dargie Harlequintet) (1952–1954) (MSD12-0494)
- Dargie in Deutschland (by Horrie Dargie Quintet) (live, 1954)
- Globe Trotting with Dargie (by Horrie Dargie and His Quintet) (1957) Festival Records (FR12-1402)
- Around the World with the Dargies (by Horrie Dargie Quintet) (1959) Columbia Records (330SX 7612)
- The Dargies Make the Party-Go!! : 36 'Sing-Along' Favourites with the Horrie Dargie Quintet (by Horrie Dargie Quintet) (1965) Astor Records (ALP1019)
- The Dargies Sing the Big Hits (by Horrie Dargie Quintet) (1965) Astor Records (ALP1020)
- The Dargies Sing Songs of the Islands: 36 Singalong Hawaiian Hits (by the Dargies) (196?) Astor Records (ALP1021)
- Harmonica Favourites (by the Dargies) (1974) Summit Records Australia (SRA-295-071)

=== Video albums ===
- Personally Yours (by Horrie Dargie and His Harmonica Quartet, Gaynor Bunning and the Muracs) (VHS compilation, 1993)

=== Extended plays ===
- Dig the Didjeridoo (by Horrie Dargie Quintet) (1963?) Astor Records (AEP-4001)

=== Singles ===
- "I Hear a Rhapsody" Regal Zonophone (G24419) (November 1941)
- "The Green Door" (1956) Festival Records
- "The Sunshine State" Columbia (DO4018) (February 1959) AUS: No. 81
- "The Alexandra Waltz" Columbia (DO4085) (August 1959) AUS: No. 33
- "The March Hare" Columbia (DO4118) (1959)
- "Tie Me Kangaroo Down, Sport" Astor Records (A7007) (May 1960) AUS: No. 34
- "Wock and Wobble" Astor Records (A7010) (1960)
- "Got a Zac in the Back of Me Pocket" Astor Records (A7011) (October 1960) AUS: No. 75
- "My Boomerang Did Come Back" Astor Records (A7015) (March 1962) AUS: No. 98
- "Strange Rain" (by the Dargies) Astor Records (A7049) (1966)
- "Yesterday" (by the Dargies) Astor Records (A7055) (196?)
