= Vikki Hammond =

Australian actress and TV host

- Born: England
- Occupation: Actress
- Years active: 1957-1987

Vikki Hammond is an Australian former actress and TV host.

== Biography ==
=== Early life ===
Hammond was born in England she trained in dance and won a beauty contest in Southwark. She appeared in a pantomime in Glasgow and in the British film, Blue Murder at St Trinian's and television series, Mostly Maynard (both 1957). Hammond married actor and comedian, Peter Colville in 1957. The couple relocated to Australia in 1959, where Hammond worked as a dancer and soubrette with the Tivoli circuit. They joined Sorlie's tour in 1960 and performed in Broken Hill. Hammond and Colville had separated by 1963. She later married car salesman and cartage contractor, Bill Forbes.

=== Career ===
Hammond appeared on TV in variety shows such as Personally Yours, Top of the Town, Merry-Go-Round, My Fair Lady, Daly at Night The Delo and Daly Show, BP Super Shows, Revue 61 She hosted the variety series Vikki on the ABC in 1963. After taking a break from show business she returned and played Maggie Hayword in The Sullivans.

Hammond's role in The Sullivans won her the 1982 Logie Award for Best Supporting Actress in a Series.

Other TV appearances include on What's It Worth?, Division 4, Homicide, Afraid of the Dark, The Flying Doctors and the opening of ATV-0.

== Filmography (selected) ==
Title	Year	Role
Mostly Maynard (TV series)	1957	
Blue Murder at St Trinian's	1957	Jane Osbourne
Musical Playhouse (TV series)	1959	Powder room girl
Ryan (TV series)	1973	Chick at Party
Homicide (TV series)	1972-1975 (3 guest roles)	Marion - Joyce Browning - Barbara Reid
Matlock Police (TV series)	1973-1975 (3 guest roles)	Joan Cope - Elizabeth Degan - Lillian Davis
Division 4. (TV series)	1971-1975	Rita Thornton - Gail Parkes - Rita Williamson
Tandarra (TV mini-series)	1976	Delia Drummond
Bluey	1976	Susie Billings
The Sullivans	1976-1982	Maggie Heyward Baker
Carson's Law (TV series)	1983-1984	Ruth Lyons
The Fast Lane (TV series)	1985	O'Rourke
The Flying Doctors	1985	Beth Drever
