= Mike Larkan =

Australian television presenter (born 1964)

- Born: Mike Larkan; 1960 (age 64–65); Sydney, Australia
- Spouse: Kathy
- Children: 2

Mike Larkan (born 1960) is an Australian television presenter.

== Career ==
Larkan is best known for his work on 10 News First, providing weather reports on location at various popular locations around the city of Melbourne.

Larkan began his career as a clerk in the sporting section of The Sun in Sydney in 1976, working for the then editor Derryn Hinch. About the same time, he landed small acting roles in TV soapies and commercials and he was also in a band called Freedom as a guitarist at 14 years of age which he described his musical talent as "dodgy"..

Upon his return to Australia two years later in 1984, Larkan joined Capital Television (now 10 Regional) in Canberra writing and reporting for the evening news and reading news updates. He became Capital's weatherman in 1988. He also returned to radio on 2CA.

In 1996 Larkan became ATV-10's weather presenter.

In August 2020, Larkan was made redundant by Network 10 as part of a centralised news bulletin that began the following month in September 2020.

== Personal life ==
Larkan was born in 1960 in Sydney. Larkan and his wife Kathy have two children.
