= Noel and Mary =

- Genre: Talk show
- Presented by: Noel Ferrier; Mary Hardy
- Country of origin: Australia
- Original language: English

Production
- Running time: 25 minutes

Original release
- Network: ATV-0
- Release: 30 January 1967

Noel and Mary is an Australian television chat show which aired 1967 on Melbourne station ATV-0 (later ATV-10 and part of Network Ten). This daytime show was hosted by Noel Ferrier and Mary Hardy, and featured interviews.

The series aired in a 25-minute time-slot. It was part of five new programmes which debuted on ATV-0 around the same time. The others were Pied Piper, Gordon and the Girls, Off to the Races and Take a Letter.
