= Vikki (TV series) =

Australian variety television show (1963)

Vikki was an Australian variety television show broadcast by the ABC in 1963. It was hosted by Vikki Hammond who was supported by singers Joe Melton and Johnny Rohan, The Vern Moore Trio and dancers. It debuted on 25 July and had a run of 13 half hour shows.

== See also ==
- List of Australian television series
