= Daly at Night =

- Genre: Talk show
- Presented by: Jonathan Daly
- Country of origin: Australia
- Original language: English

Original release
- Network: HSV-7
- Release: 7 March 1962 – 29 March 1963

Daly at Night is an Australian television series which aired from 7 March 1962 to 29 March 1963, aired on Wednesdays, Thursdays and Fridays on Melbourne station HSV-7. Hosted by American-born Jonathan Daly, the series was an interview program. Other regulars on the series included Horrie Dargie, Vikki Hammond, Lou Richards, Frank Thring and Arthur Young. Daly was later co-star of another 1960s Australian series, variety show The Delo and Daly Show.

In a review of the final episode, newspaper The Age said "It opened, brave in its inadequacy, with business as usual; some talk leading nowhere on the reported falling numbers of students seeking a higher musical education. But who among those still watching cared about these things on Daly at Night's final night?"

Information on the archival status of the series is not available.
