= Geoff Raymond =

Australian television news presenter

Geoffrey Raymond
- Born: 1921 or 1922
- Died: 4 January 2011; England
- Occupations: television presenter; tourist resort manager; publican
- Years active: 1946–1984
- Known for: reading television news bulletins
- Television: HSV-7 News; Take it East; The Raymond Report; ABV-2 News

Geoffrey Sinclair Raymond (1921 or 1922 – 4 January 2011) was an Australian television news presenter.

He is best remembered for his work with the Australian Broadcasting Corporation where he anchored ABC News in Melbourne from 1973 to 1984.

== Career ==
Raymond began his career as a copy boy for Melbourne newspaper The Herald. He then joined radio station 3DB in the 1940's as a newsreader where his profile grew.

In 1956, Raymond was working at 3UZ as chief announcer where he was instrumental in establishing the station's news service.

After a brief stint at the BBC in England, Raymond returned to Melbourne to read the news on television station HSV-7 after Eric Pearce left the station to join GTV-9. At HSV-7, he also hosted the discussion program Answer Please. He also co-hosted a HSV-7 program called Take It East with Nehama Patkin.

Throughout this period, he also played a role in HSV-7's coverage of sport, calling Victorian Football League matches alongside Michael Williamson between 1959 and 1962.

He then joined ATV-0 where he read the news from 1970 and also hosted his own weekly current affairs program The Raymond Report in 1971.

Raymond then joined the ABC as its chief newsreader on its Melbourne television station ABV-2 in 1973.

Raymond was also a keen photographer. In June 1980, photographs that had been taken by Raymond during two trips to Israel, Egypt and Jordan in 1979 formed part of an exhibition at the B'nai B'rith Centre in Sydney which was officially opened by Senator Peter Baume. Raymond said he hoped that his photos would in some way help relations between Israel and Egypt. He had first displayed the photos in Melbourne in 1979 at an exhibition officially opened by Roger Shipton.

While at the ABC, he also appeared at various events such as the National Book Council awards dinner in St Kilda in 1980 and the Carols by Candlelight event at Caulfield in 1981.

Raymond retired from television in February 1984.

The appointment of Ralphe Neill as Raymond's successor was met with opposition from ABC staff and led to a 12-day strike. Thirty-four staff from ABC Television walked off the job on 13 July 1984 in protest of the way Neill had been appointed to replace Raymond, claiming the normal procedures for such appointments had not been followed. Staff from ABC Radio joined the strike a week later. The strike ended on 25 July 1984 when it appeared an agreement had been reached between staff and management although the ABC Staff Association refused to divulge details. ABC management later said Neill's appointment had been eventually accepted by staff.

After leaving television, Raymond moved to Fiji to manage the Tabua Sands Hotel tourist resort. In 1986, Raymond returned to Australia to manage the Ferntree Tavern near Mount Wellington in Tasmania.

Raymond died in England at the age of 89 on 4 January 2011. His death prompted various tributes from television identities including former colleague David Johnston.
