= Personally Yours =

1962 Australian TV series

- Genre: Variety
- Presented by: Horrie Dargie
- Country of origin: Australia
- Original language: English

Original release
- Network: ABC Television
- Release: 12 July – 4 October 1962

Personally Yours is an Australian television series which aired on ABC Television during 1962. Horrie Dargie was the host. It was a variety series produced in Melbourne. Each episode featured a different star.

Some of the episodes (along with still photographs) are held by the National Archives of Australia.

== Guests ==
Guests on Personally Yours include:

- Randy Ross
- Les Patching
- Mary Hardy
- Vikki Hammond
- Johnny Rohan
- Bob Hornery
- Joan Clarke
- Reg Gray
- Johnny Kendall
- Terry Holden
- Gaynor Bunning
- Jon Finlayson
