= Ken Delo =

American singer (1938–2016)

- Birth name: Kenneth Edward Delo
- Born: December 8, 1938; River Rouge, Michigan, United States
- Died: February 8, 2016 (aged 77); Gilbert, Arizona, United States
- Genres: Traditional pop
- Occupation(s): Singer, comedian
- Instrument: Vocals
- Years active: 1961–2016
- Labels: Ranwood

Kenneth Edward Delo (December 8, 1938 – February 8, 2016) was an American singer best known as a member of television's The Lawrence Welk Show.

Born and reared in River Rouge, Michigan, Delo started performing first as a magician, then a ventriloquist, and later a hypnotist before taking up singing by miming to records. While attending the Roman Catholic-affiliated Our Lady Of Lourdes High School in River Rouge, he made his public singing debut as a member of a doo-wop group known as The Pencil Smudges, a take-off of the group The Ink Spots, singing "The Battle of Jericho" at a school recital.

About 1961, after serving in the United States Army, Delo teamed up with his Army friend and fellow performer Jonathan Daly to form the Martin & Lewis-style comedy team of Delo & Daly. The act was popular in Australia throughout the 1960s with their television variety show and numerous concert appearances, however upon their arrival back to the United States to capitalize on their growing fame, the act broke up as Daly chose to go into television production work.

By 1969, Delo was in Los Angeles moving on with his career, making guest TV appearances on shows such as Mission: Impossible and Here's Lucy. His introduction to Lawrence Welk came from Arthur Duncan, the show's featured tap dancer who had known Delo from their days in Australia. Upon Duncan's recommendation, the maestro invited him on the show as a guest star, singing the "Hawaiian Wedding Song". Three more guest appearances and positive viewer response led Lawrence to hire him as a full-time performer for the 1969–70 season, and remained on for the remainder of the show's run. Delo's performances frequently involved his sitting in the audience, singing directly to various female show-goers.

After the show ended, Delo continued his performing career, either on the road with his fellow Welk stars or as a headliner at the Lawrence Welk Resort in Branson, Missouri, from 1994 to 1999. He also became an author, penning the novel The Frozen Horror.

He lived in Gilbert, Arizona with his wife Marilyn. They were married on June 30, 1956. His record label KimKev Records, was named after his two children, Kimberly and Kevin. Delo died from pneumonia in February 2016 at the age of 77.
