= Chit-Chat (TV program) =

- Genre: Talk show
- Presented by: Katrina Pye
- Country of origin: Australia
- Original language: English

Original release
- Network: ATV-0
- Release: 8 August 1967

Chit-Chat is an Australian morning television program which aired 1967 on Melbourne station ATV-0 (now ATV-10 and part of Network Ten). It was a daytime interview program. It aired at 10:30AM, and aired against a test pattern on ABV-2, Lincoln Land (including Here's Humphrey) on GTV-9, and no programming on HSV-7.
