= The Sullivans =

Australian television series (1976–83)

- The Sullivans main title caption
- Genre: Soap opera; Drama
- Created by: Crawford Productions
- Starring: Lorraine Bayly; Paul Cronin; Andrew McFarlane; Steven Tandy; Susan Hannaford; Richard Morgan; Michael Caton; Megan Williams; Reg Gorman; Vikki Hammond; Chantal Contouri; Norman Yemm; Vivean Gray
- Country of origin: Australia
- Original language: English
- No. of episodes: 1,114

Production
- Production locations: Melbourne, Victoria
- Running time: 22 minutes (episodes 1 and 2 are each 46 minutes)
- Production company: Crawford Productions

Original release
- Network: Nine Network; Syndication
- Release: 15 November 1976 – 10 March 1983

The Sullivans is an Australian television soap opera which broadcast on the Nine Network from 15 November 1976 until 10 March 1983. and was produced by Crawford Productions

The series tells the story of a fictional average middle-class Melbourne family and the effect that the Second World War and the immediate post-war events had on their lives. It covers the period between 1 September 1939 to 22 August 1947. It was a consistent ratings success in Australia, and also became popular in the United Kingdom, Ireland, the Netherlands, Greece, Malaysia and New Zealand.

== Pre-production ==
The show was purchased by Channel Nine without a television pilot program being produced. They commissioned 34 hours with a view to extension. Fourteen writers were assigned to the thirteen plot lines which had been devised.

The cast had not been established when they started writing the series and three months later they still had only two cast members, Vikki Hammond and Noni Hazlehurst.

When researching the period, the set designer Nick Rossendale said at the time "when you are dealing with a period of time that is well within living memory, you have to watch things very carefully". Hence, the painstaking research into the reality of the show.

In 1976, the show was regarded as an ambitious project with the biggest budget ever for a commercial network series. It reputedly cost A$1,000,000 to set up.

== Story and setting ==
The story began in 1939, with the declaration of war against Germany. From the outset the series focused on the Sullivan family of fictitious address 7 Gordon Street, Camberwell, Melbourne, Victoria along with their neighbourhood friends, relatives and associates. The majority of the show's storylines related to the war, focusing on either the fighting itself or its effect on the Sullivan family. Scenes of battles in North Africa, Greece (including Crete), Britain, New Guinea and Malaya were all filmed in or around Melbourne. However, some of the exterior scenes in the Netherlands were actually filmed in Amsterdam.

The series was renowned for its high production standards. The programme's researchers went to great lengths to ensure both historical and cultural accuracy. Many scenes were timestamped and the scripts referenced actual military developments and events of the time, such as discussion of specific battles, sporting results and cinematic releases. For instance, this even went down to the weather, where the researchers checked through back copies of newspapers. Authentic 1930s furniture was located and used on sets, while kitchen pantries and the corner store were stocked with packaged goods of the era.

The set designer Nick Rossendale said it was a "fascinating job" to find these items. He went on to say that the big companies would say to him they didn't have anything for him but he persisted by asking if he could look through their warehouses. "When I got in, I usually found something", he said. "It's amazing what a bit of research and looking around will dig up. The forgotten stuff that was lying around was unbelievable. No one knew it was there."

For instance, he found "hundreds of old pub mirrors labels, completely clean and unused" with every one of them "for a certain period of time". He said "to reproduce these would have cost a fortune but we can now label any product – can or bottle – with a real label so it won't be a reproduction at all."

== Characters ==
- Grace Sullivan (née Donovan) – born 24 October 1898 (Lorraine Bayly) was the Sullivan matriarch. The daughter of Dr Edmond Donovan, she married David Sullivan, a young soldier invalided from the battlefront, on 4 April 1918. She was intelligent, rational and greatly respected by her family. Although opposed to her sons enlisting to fight, she eventually came to terms with this. Grace was a devout Catholic, which sometimes created tension with her husband Dave, who was a non-practising Anglican. Later in the series, she flew to London at the request of the War Office, to assist with the recovery of her son John. There she was killed when a German V-1 flying bomb struck John's flat on 6 July 1944 (episode 598).
- Dave Sullivan (Paul Cronin) – born 17 February 1896 – was an upright, hard-working and somewhat old-fashioned patriarch. He was a foreman at a small engineering firm and a veteran of the First World War, serving in the light cavalry in the Middle East. Dave eventually becomes a freemason, councillor and tries at national politics. At the outbreak of war in 1939, Dave encouraged his sons to fight; later in the series he eventually enlisted himself, reaching the rank of Major in the engineering corps. Dave was hit by a car on 22 August 1947 (episode 1,112) and died the following day (episode 1,113), an event that marked the final scenes of the entire series. He never marries again after the death of Grace despite proposing to Elizabeth Bradley (Maggie Millar) (in episode 790) as he always put his family first.
- John Sullivan (John David Sullivan) – born 12 October 1920 (Andrew McFarlane) was Dave and Grace's eldest child. A medical student at Melbourne University in 1939, he was vehemently opposed to the war, leading to many confrontations with his more traditionalist father. John's relationship with German-born Anna Kaufman (Ingrid Mason) also caused complications. Anna died on 19 December 1940 (episode 117). After her death, John relented and joined the medical corps, leaving the family on 4 June 1941 (episode 228). He was lost at sea and, for two years, presumed dead. His return to the series prompted Grace Sullivan to fly to England where John was convalescing. John was featured in "The John Sullivan Story" (see below) and intermittently in the series again between episodes 505 and 616.
- Tom Sullivan (Thomas William Sullivan) – born 14 June 1922 (Steven Tandy) was the second Sullivan child, an engineering student who, unlike his brother John, was keen to sign up and fight for his country. Tom served the duration of the series in the military, serving in North Africa, Greece, Crete, the Netherlands and Malaya and eventually reaching officer rank. Late in the series he returned to civilian life, took up university studies and married an American lawyer, Patti Spencer (Penny Downie) on 4 September 1946 (episode 922), though it was not a successful marriage.
- Terry Sullivan (Terence Charles Sullivan) – born 9 April 1924 (Richard Morgan) was the third and youngest Sullivan son. A scampish schoolboy at the beginning of the series, as he matured he harboured dreams of joining the Air Force, but an inner ear problem prevented this (episode 294) and he joined the Army instead (episode 301). He later married Caroline O'Brien (Toni Vernon episodes 273 to 493; Geneviève Picot episodes 666 to 888) on 22 September 1942 (episode 334); however, the war took a greater psychological toll on Terry than his brothers; he was interned in Changi Prison and he struggled both with his marriage and his readjustment to civilian life. Terry was jailed on 9 May 1946 for 10 years for stealing explosives and assault (episode 886). He escaped from jail with Victor Fisher, another inmate, on 17 August 1947 (episode 1,111). He was indirectly responsible for the death of his father Dave in the concluding episode of the series.
- Kitty Sullivan (Katherine Mary Sullivan) – born 7 February 1926 (Susan Hannaford). The youngest child and the only girl. Shy, sensitive and conscientious, Kitty is a romantic who finds the best in everyone. She was upset by the war early in the series and was prone to outbursts of emotion. Her character strengthened as the series progressed, and in 1943 (episode 427) she decided to take up nursing. Kitty married war correspondent Robbie McGovern (Graham Harvey) on 5 October 1944 (episode 668). The couple had a daughter, Grace McGovern (named after Kitty's mother), born on 13 May 1946 (episode 769). Robbie, affected by his war experiences, later committed suicide (episode 868).
- Harry Sullivan (Michael Caton) was Dave's younger brother, a wise-cracking larrikin with a fondness for goods of dubious origin ('fallen from the back of a truck). His bubbly wife Rose (Maggie Dence) drowned in the Yarra River during a picnic on 1 January 1942 (episode 268). This had a devastating effect on Harry. Harry received a three-month jail sentence on 22 May 1944 (episode 578) for handling stolen goods. After leaving jail, Harry set up his own business. He left the family to go to Queensland, finding there was money in Army disposals (episode 744).
- Maggie Hayward (Vikki Hammond) was the divorced owner of the local pub the 'Great Southern', and Jack Fletcher (Reg Gorman) was her barman. Both were well known to Dave Sullivan, Maggie as a former girlfriend and Jack through military service together during the First World War. The bar of the Great Southern was a common setting throughout the series. Jack eventually divorces his wife.
- Norm Baker (Norman Yemm) was another of Dave Sullivan's army comrades. He served in the same regiment as Dave in the First World War and was a close family friend. Like Dave, he was old-fashioned, straight-talking and fond of beer. He enlisted with Tom Sullivan and Bert Duggan at the beginning of the series and served the entire war, becoming a captain. He married his first wife, Melina Tsangarakis (Chantal Contouri), a Cretan, on 5 March 1942 (episode 286). She was executed by a Nazi officer, Heinrich Krull on 13 April 1942 (episode 298). He later returned to Australia and married Maggie Hayward on 30 June 1943 (episode 408). Norm was later involved in an SOE mission to track down Heinrich Krull whom he killed on 10 October 1944 (episode 672).
- Ida Jessup (Vivean Gray) was the Sullivans' English-born next-door neighbour, brought up in Battersea. Her late husband had served in the First World War before being gassed and invalided back to Britain. At times prone to meddling and puritanical gossip, Mrs Jessup's character mellowed to show great strength and understanding as the series progressed. Later in the series, she married Englishman Arthur Pike (Wallas Eaton) on 26 July 1946 (episode 908).
- Bert Duggan (Peter Hehir) and his neglected wife Lil Duggan (Noni Hazlehurst) appeared in the early seasons as lodgers taken in by Mrs Jessup. Bert, a devious womaniser, enlisted with Tom to escape arrest for illegal bookmaking; he matured whilst serving with Tom and Norm over the next two years of war, although he often had a money-making scheme on the go. He died from wounds received after stepping on a mine, in North Africa on 30 March 1942 (episode 292).
- The Kaufmans - father Hans Kaufman (Leon Lissek), mother Lottie Kaufman (Marcella Burgoyne) and daughter Anna Kaufman (Ingrid Mason) were German-born immigrants with their Australian-born daughter who owned the local shop, the Universal Store. Although they opposed the Nazi German regime, their German status created problems for them at the outbreak of war and Hans was eventually interned as an enemy alien. As an act of solidarity, Lottie chose to be interned with him (episode 76). Soon after, Anna married John Sullivan; however, she later contracted polio and died. This broke Hans's heart and he died in the internment camp a short while later.
- Alice Sullivan/Watkins/Morgan (Megan Williams). Maggie's long-lost daughter was put up for adoption as soon as she was born, with Maggie citing she could not properly take care of her. It is unknown who the father was, just that he was killed during the First World War. She takes over the running of the shop and becomes one of the series' main characters. Initially, she marries Michael Watkins, a nephew of Mrs Jessup. Their marriage was not successful and he later dies in a car accident. She eventually married Jim Sullivan (Andy Anderson).

== Critical and popular reception ==
The Sullivans attracted critical acclaim and was also one of Australia's most popular drama series, screening in half-hour episodes at 7.00 p.m.

In 1978 it was the third most popular show on Australian TV, after Are You Being Served? and Against the Wind.

The show's popularity waned somewhat after 1979 following the departure of Lorraine Bayly. When she asked to leave the series the show's producers instead offered her six months' leave. Her character Grace was sent to London to care for her injured son John, and a series of pre-taped segments were used in her absence to maintain her presence. The London scenes featured actors imported from New Zealand so Australian viewers would not recognise familiar actors. When Bayly refused to return after six months, she was written out of the series and Grace was killed by a V1 bomb during a London air raid.

Despite Bayly's departure ratings remained high enough for the series to remain in production. In 1981 the war ended in the storyline and there were plans for the series to continue with examinations of elements of post-war Australian history such as the Snowy River hydro-electric scheme. However, the decision of Paul Cronin to leave the series at this time prompted the show's cancellation before any of this could come to fruition. The final scenes were shot on 19 July 1982.

== Logie Awards ==
In the first full year of production, The Sullivans won five Logies in 1978. Paul Cronin was Most Popular Australian Actor, Lorraine Bayly was Most Popular Australian Actress, Michael Caton won for Best Sustained Performance by an Actor in a Supporting Role, Vivean Gray won for Best Sustained Performance by an Actress in a Supporting Role and, finally, the show won Most Popular Australian Drama. It would win the latter award for the next two years running.

== The John Sullivan Story ==
The John Sullivan Story
- Directed by: David Stevens
- Written by: Tony Morphett; Brian Wright
- Produced by: John Barningham
- Starring: Andrew McFarlane; Olivia Hamnett; Frank Gallacher; Michael Caton; Roger Oakley
- Production company: Crawford Productions
- Distributed by: Eaton Films
- Release date: 5 August 1979
- Running time: 108 mins
- Country: Australia
- Language: English

The John Sullivan Story is a 1979 telefilm spin off from the series. It was used to explain what happened to John Sullivan in the years in which he went missing on the show. It was first shown on GTV9 Melbourne and TCN9 Sydney on Sunday 5 August 1979.

It was to be the first of a series of films based on characters from the show though due to moderate ratings the idea was shelved making it the only official TV film spin-off from the series.

=== Premise ===
After his troopship is sunk in 1941, John Sullivan is saved by Yugoslav Chetniks, whose leader Marko forces John to travel with him up through Greek Macedonia to a village where he has to practice as a doctor. He saves the life of a Jewish girl, Nadia, with whom he falls in love.

John is then captured by the Gestapo but escapes. He meets British Special Operations Executive (SOE) agents Major Barrington and Captain Meg Fulton. He goes to live with the Partisans. John leaves Yugoslavia.

=== Production ===
According to Alan Hardy, who was an executive at Crawfords at the time:

We developed the story in order to come up with a backstory which would justify Grace Sullivan leaving. Lorraine Bayley, who played Grace, wanted out. What if John Sullivan was alive… and screenwriter Brian Wright came up with the idea that John had been rescued from a shipwreck by the Partisans in Yugoslavia and had information but was injured and only his mother might be able to get him to remember. It was such a good story that we did it as a television movie shown on a Sunday night as the next ep in the series. David Stevens was to direct and one of his favourite ever actors was the dashing Ronald Lewis. He was cast on that basis but arrived, much to everyone’s shock and horror, a broken-down drunk with a drunk wife. No longer the handsome young Welshman. Somehow, he staggered unimpressively through it, went back to the UK and never worked again.

=== Reception ===
Vera Plevnik won the Logie for Best New Talent for her performance.

== International success ==
The series enjoyed success outside Australia when it was broadcast by networks in the United Kingdom, Ireland and continental Europe, usually as a daytime filler. The series was sold to over 45 countries worldwide.

It’s also one of Nine network shows that had major success around the world along with Skippy the Bush Kangaroo, The Young Doctors, The Flying Doctors and McLeod's Daughters

== DVD releases ==
The first 26 episodes of the series were initially released on DVD in the Netherlands. The DVD audio is in English with removable Dutch subtitles. By October 2016 in Australia, all 1,114 episodes are available to purchase through Crawfords DVD (Region 0) over 23 volumes. A bonus DVD is also available with volume six of "The John Sullivan Story" which was a stand-alone TV film. In the UK (Region 2), Volume 1 (episodes 1–50) was released on 12 March 2012 followed by Volume 2 (episodes 51–100) on 30 July 2012. Volume 3 (episodes 101–150) and Volume 4 (episodes 151–200) were released on 27 May 2013 and then Volume 5 (episodes 201–250) and Volume 6 (episodes 251–300) on 28 April 2014. Volume 7 (episodes 301–350) and Volume 8 (episodes 351–400) were released on 26 May 2014. From November 2015 all volumes can be purchased in the UK through Crawford's distributor, Eaton Films Ltd.

== See also ==
- Irish Australians
