= Good Morning Melbourne =

- Genre: Morning show
- Presented by: Roy Hampson; Annette Allison
- Country of origin: Australia
- Original language: English
- No. of seasons: 8

Production
- Production locations: Melbourne, Victoria

Original release
- Network: Network Ten
- Release: 1981 – 1988

Related
- Everyday (1979–1980); Good Morning Australia (1992–2005)

Good Morning Melbourne is an Australian local morning show which aired on Network Ten in Victoria only, between 1981 until 1988. It was hosted by Roy Hampson and Annette Allison.
