= An Evening With (Australian TV series) =

- Genre: Variety
- Presented by: David Brice
- Country of origin: Australia
- Original language: English
- No. of episodes: 6

Original release
- Network: CTC-7
- Release: 23 August 1966 – 31 December 1967

An Evening With was an Australian television series which aired from 23 August 1966 until 31 December 1967 on Canberra station CTC-7. Hosted by David Brice and broadcast monthly, the series was a variety show, and featured both Canberra-based and interstate talent. Little Pattie appeared as the main performer in a 1967 episode. A compilation episode entitled Selections from An Evening With aired on 31 December 1967.

== Episodes ==
No.	Title	Original release date
1	"Treblefolk"	23 August 1966
2	Unknown	Unknown
3	"Sandy Scott"	18 October 1966
TBA	"International Christmas"	13 December 1966
TBA	"Little Pattie"	28 February 1967
TBA	"Selections from An Evening With"	31 December 1967

== See also ==
- Tonight in Canberra
