= BP Super Show =

Australian television series

- Genre: Variety
- Country of origin: Australia
- Original language: English

Original release
- Network: ATN-7; TCN-9; Nine Network
- Release: 1959 – 1970

The BP Super Show was an Australian television series of loosely scheduled TV specials often of the variety show genre (but not always), which aired from circa 1959 to circa 1970. The programs often featured international performers that were touring Australia. It originally aired on ATN-7 in Sydney and GTV-9 in Melbourne, with the production of episodes varying between the two stations, and it also aired on other stations across Australia (this was prior to the formation of the Seven Network and Nine Network). It aired on the Nine Network after the formation of that network. Given the varied nature of the episodes, critical reception varied, but was often very positive, with a 1961 episode with Ella Fitzgerald being called by The Age newspaper "one of the best shows of its type presented on Melbourne TV".

== Episodes ==
Several episodes have been released on DVD by Umbrella Entertainment.

Title/Guest	Original release date
Ella Fitzgerald	14 January 1961
Margot Fonteyn	1962
Moscow State Variety Theatre	15 September 1962
Bolshoi Ballet	6 October 1962
"Alice in Wonderland"	16 December 1962
Louis Armstrong and his All Stars	13 April 1963
Arthur Rubinstein	1964
Vienna Boys Choir	19 September 1964
Omsk Siberian Company	5 December 1964
Rolf Harris	1965
Australian Ballet Company	1965
Max Bygraves	11 September 1965
"Fashion '66 - Melbourne Cup International Collection"	6 November 1965
Moscow State Circus	1965
Berioska Dance Company of Moscow	16 July 1966
Allan Sherman	29 October 1966
"Fashion '67 - The Trendsetters"	7 November 1966
Hosted by Don Lane
Jill Perryman	17 December 1966
Osipov Balalaika Russian Orchestra	22 July 1967
Peter, Paul and Mary	17 June 1967
The Great Luisillo	26 August 1967
Trini Lopez	10 April 1968
"Coppelia" (Australian Ballet Company)	5 October 1968
Frank Fontaine	10 January 1968
The Young Americans	1969
Hans Christian Andersen	29 November 1970
