= ATV (Australian TV station) =

Network 10 television station in Melbourne, Australia

- Melbourne, Victoria; Australia
- City: Melbourne
- Channels: Digital: 11 (VHF); Virtual: 10
- Branding: 10

Programming
- Language: English
- Affiliations: 10 (O&O)

Ownership
- Owner: Paramount Networks UK & Australia (Ten Network Holdings); (Network TEN (Melbourne) Pty Ltd)

History
- First air date: 1 August 1964; 62 years ago
- Former names: ATV0 (1964–1980)
- Former channel numbers: Analog: 0 (VHF) (1964–1980); Analog: 10 (VHF) (1980–2013)
- Former affiliations: Independent Television System (1964–1965)
- Call sign meaning: Austarama; Television; Victoria

Technical information
- Licensing authority: Australian Communications and Media Authority
- ERP: 200 kW (analog); 50 kW (digital)
- HAAT: 577 metres (1,893 ft) (analog); 581 metres (1,906 ft) (digital)
- Transmitter coordinates: 37°50′15″S 145°20′48″E

Links
- Website: 10.com.au

ATV is a television station in Melbourne, Australia, part of Network 10 – one of the three major Australian free-to-air commercial television networks. The station is owned by Paramount Networks UK & Australia.

== History ==
=== Formation and early years (1963–75) ===
In April 1963, the licence to operate Melbourne's third commercial television station was awarded to Austarama Television, owned by transport magnate Reginald Ansett. The new channel, ATV-0 (pronounced as the letter O, never the number zero), began transmission on 1 August 1964 from a large modern studio complex, with state-of-the-art videotaping, and located in the then-outer eastern suburb of Nunawading,in the locality now known as Forest Hill, but referred to at the time as Burwood East.

The new station opened with a preview program hosted by Barry McQueen and Nancy Cato followed by a variety program, This Is It!. Reception difficulties (existing sets had to be retuned by a repairman) in parts of the city resulted in the station's virtually permanent third position in the Melbourne television ratings.

In 1964, under Reg Ansett, ATV-0 opened their studios in Nunawading, which was at the time the first purpose-built commercial television station in Melbourne. It was also the studio where the first ever colour broadcast in Australia would be filmed, leading to its consideration for heritage status in 2018.

=== Switch to colour (1975) ===
ATV-0 had been experimenting with colour transmissions from 1967, when the station was the first to mount a colour outside broadcast in Australia, from the Pakenham races. Many other colour test transmissions occurred subsequently. Full-time colour transmission was introduced to ATV-0 in March 1975 in line with other stations around the country.

=== Acquisition by Rupert Murdoch (1981) ===
Rupert Murdoch gained a controlling interest in Sydney television station TEN-10 in 1979 and had bought a controlling stake in transport company Ansett, owner of Austarama Television (licensee of ATV-0). That triggered a government inquiry into media ownership, the main concern being Murdoch having a controlling interest in television stations in Australia's two largest cities, ignoring the fact that the Kerry Packer-owned Australian Consolidated Press had controlled the Nine Network channels in Melbourne and Sydney for many years.

Due to problems in reception and falling ratings, and the desire to move TV stations out of the VHF band so as to enable FM radio in Australia, the station moved frequency and call-sign from ATV-0 to ATV-10, after getting the agreement of neighbouring Gippsland station GLV-10 to change its frequency to become GLV-8. On 20 January 1980, the revamped ATV-10 was launched with a jingle campaign ("You're on Top With Ten"), Graham Kennedy's introductory presentation and 10's Summer Sunday, a 3-hour live outside broadcast from Torquay Beach. Later in the evening, You're On Top With Ten with Kennedy provided a preview of upcoming shows on the new channel, followed by the movie-length pilot for new drama series Arcade.

On 11 February 1980, Eyewitness News was relaunched with David Johnston and Jana Wendt as chief newsreaders. By May, Eyewitness News went back to its former one-hour duration, claiming that it was "First in Melbourne" due to its many innovations and historic moments and the fact that in the 1970s ATV was the first of the now "Network Ten" stations to adopt the Eyewitness News brand and the one-hour newscast(with the first 1-hour newscast debuting in November 1975). Wendt left the channel in 1981 with Charles Slade replacing her and was later replaced by Jo Pearson, who served till 1988, joined by Mal Walden in 1987 and by the next year by Tracey Curro.

By the end of 1981, Murdoch had finally received approval for control of ATV-10.

The 1986 transfer of Neighbours to the Ten Network (from the Seven Network) proved to be a success. Aside from its use of suburban locations in Melbourne itself, ATV-10's Nunawading studios were used to produce the program.

On 7 September 1992, After 28 years, ATV-10 relocated from the station's famous Nunawading studios to the Como Centre in inner suburban South Yarra. The Nunawading complex is now operated by Fremantle Media, while the Como Centre studios in South Yarra are used for The Project as well as news, current affairs, entertainment and sport programs.

In 2004, Network 10 finished second nationally, and in ATV-10's Melbourne region, only behind the dominant Nine Network.

On 10 December 2013, at 9:00:01am ATV-10 became one of the last stations in Australia to switch off its analog TV signal being the last Network 10 station and 4th last in the whole country of Australia to convert to digital-only transmission, the switch was flicked by Bob Rosenthal a retired ATV-10 engineer who 33 years earlier was there to switch ATV-0 over to ATV-10. Months after the switch the channel, together with the network, marked its golden jubilee anniversary.

== Morning television ==
Local mid-morning programming from 1967 included Morning Magazine, Roundabout, The Roy Hampson Show, In Melbourne Today, Everyday (1979–1980) and Good Morning Melbourne (1981–1988) – the latter replaced by the Sydney-based Til Ten (1989–1991). In 1992, ATV-10 produced The Morning Show for the Network Ten, hosted by Bert Newton. The program was re-titled Good Morning Australia in 1993. GMA stayed on air until December 2005 and the following month was replaced by 9am with David & Kim hosted by Kim Watkins and David Reyne. The show had four years on air and in 2010 was replaced by The Circle hosted by Gorgi Coghlan, Yumi Stynes, Chrissie Swan and Denise Drysdale.

In 2012, after 40 years of producing morning television, the Ten Network made the decision to stop production on The Circle in favour of providing extra funds for its low-rating Breakfast program produced out of Sydney, and hosted by Paul Henry which was itself axed at the end of the year. In November 2013 the Network launched breakfast show Wake Up which was broadcast live from both Sydney and Melbourne and hosted by Natarsha Belling and James Mathison with News Updates presented by Nuala Hafner live from a glass studio at Melbourne's Federation Square. The show was later axed in May 2014 due to cost-cutting measures.

== Digital multiplex ==
LCN	Service	SD/HD
1	10 HD	HD
10	10	SD
11	10 Comedy	SD
12	10 Drama	HD
13	Nickelodeon	SD
15	10 HD	HD
16	You.tv	SD
17	Gecko TV	SD

== Programming ==
Locally produced programs by or with ATV-10 Melbourne.

=== Current productions at ATV Studios, South Yarra ===
- 10 News: Melbourne (1964–present)
- Formula One Australian Grand Prix coverage (2003–present)
- Have You Been Paying Attention? (2013–present)
- The Cheap Seats (2021–present)
- Sam Pang Tonight (2025–present)

=== Past productions at ATV Studios ===
2020s

- 10 News First: Breakfast (Thursdays and Fridays only, 2022)

2010s

- Kinne Tonight (2019–2020)
- MotoGP coverage (2015–2018)
- Rugby coverage (2017–2019)
- The Sunday Project (2017–2025, shared with Sydney studios)
- Women's Big Bash League coverage (2015–2017)
- Big Bash League coverage (2013–2017)
- The Thursday Night Sport Show (2014)
- 50 Years Young (2014)
- Glasgow Commonwealth Games Live Coverage (2014)
- Sochi Winter Olympics Live Coverage (2014)
- This Week Live (2013)
- Meet the Press (2012) Production moved to Sydney
- The Bolt Report (2011–2015)
- The Circle (2010–2012)

2000s

- The Project (2009–2025)
- The Game Plan (AFL) (2011–2012) (via One) (2009–2011)
- One Week at a Time (via One) (2009–2011)
- ANZ Championship Netball coverage (2008–2012, 2015–2016)
- 9am with David and Kim (2006–2009)
- Before the Game (2003–2013)
- AFL (2002–2011)
- 10 News: Adelaide (2000–2011, 2020–2023)

1990s

- The Panel (1998–2004)
- Hinch (1992–1993)
- Good Morning Australia as GMA with Bert Newton (1992–2005)

1980s

- Family Double Dare (1989)
- Double Dare (1989–1992)
- Ten Morning News (1986–1991) (1994–2000) Production moved to TEN Sydney
- The Comedy Company (1988–1990)
- The Early Bird Show (1985–1989)
- The Henderson Kids (1985–1987)
- Holiday Island (1981)

1970s

- Good Morning Melbourne (1979–1988)
- Prisoner (1979–1986)
- Melbourne Cup coverage (1978–2001, 2019–2023)
- The Early Bird Show (1977–1980, 1985–1989)
- The Box (1974–1977)
- The Price Is Right (1973–1974, 1989)
- Matlock Police (1971–1975)
- Young Talent Time (1971–1988)

1960s

- Fredd Bear's Breakfast-A-Go-Go (1969–1971)
- Magic Circle Club (1964–1967)
- The Children's Show (1964)
- The Go!! Show
- The Ray Taylor Show
- This Is It
- Romper Room
- Katrina
- Noel and Mary
- Aweful Movie with Deadly Earnest (1967–1972)

=== Past productions on location around Melbourne ===
- 2010 Commonwealth Games (2010) Docklands Studios Melbourne
- Mr & Mrs Murder (2013) Location
- Bikie Wars: Brothers in Arms (2012) Location
- Everybody Dance Now (TV series) (2012) Docklands Studios Melbourne
- Talkin' 'Bout Your Generation (2009–2012) Docklands Studios Melbourne
- Rush (2008–2011) Location
- Are You Smarter Than a 5th Grader? (2007–2009) Docklands Studios Melbourne
- The Wedge (2006–2007) Location
- Thank God You're Here (2006–2008) ATV-10 Studios/Global Television Studios
- The Secret Life Of Us (2001–2005) St Kilda
- Rove (2000–2009) ATV-10 Studios/Global Television Studios
- Totally Full Frontal moved from HSV-7 (1998–1999) ATV-10 Studios/Location
- A Country Practice moved from ATN-7 (1994) ATV-10 Studios/Location

== News and current affairs ==
10 News Melbourne is presented from ATV-10's Como Centre studios in South Yarra by Jennifer Keyte with sports presenter Stephen Quartermain (Monday - Thursday) and Caty Price (Friday) and weather presenter Jayde Cotic.

ATV-0's first news presenter was its news director, Brian Wright, before Barry McQueen took over regular news presenting duties. The station's initial news format on weeknights was a 45-minute bulletin starting at 6:15 pm, aimed at competing with the 30-minute bulletins offered by rival stations GTV-9 and HSV-7. The news format was changed a number of times, with the eventual adoption of the network's one-hour format in the early 1970s, and its take on the Eyewitness News format and brand in 1972, then presented by Geoff Raymond.

The flagship weeknight bulletin was formerly presented by David Johnston, who was replaced by Mal Walden following his move to HSV-7 in 1996. Co-presenter Jennifer Hansen, who with Walden formed one of the longest-serving news duos in Australian television history, was replaced by Helen Kapalos in 2006. Walden became sole anchor in December 2012 following the network's decision not to renew Kapalos' contract a month beforehand.

In February 2018, Brad McEwan announced his resignation from Network 10 to pursue other career opportunities. He finished with the network on Friday 27 April 2018.

Previous fill-in presenters included Brad McEwan and George Donikian.

Regular weekend bulletins from Melbourne were axed in the early 1990s in favour of a national bulletin from Sydney. However, localised editions of Ten Weekend News were reintroduced on Saturdays during the AFL season and presented by George Donikian, followed by a localised edition of Sports Tonight for Victoria. Permanent weekend bulletins were reintroduced in January 2011 (alongside a short-lived 6:30 pm bulletin on weeknights) but discontinued ten months later.

From September 2020 to February 2023, ATV-10 also oversaw studio production of the Adelaide edition of 10 News. Both bulletins were presented by Jennifer Keyte, combining local opt-outs for news, sport and weather with some shared content from the two states.

=== Presenters and reporters ===
News presenter

- Jennifer Keyte (2018–present)

Sports presenter

- Stephen Quartermain (1993–2013, 2018–present)

Weather presenter

- Jayde Cotic (2023–present)

Fill-in presenters

- Candice Wyatt (News)
- Stephen Quartermain (News)
- Nick Butler (Sport)
- Caty Price (Sport)

Reporters

- Candice Wyatt
- Jessica Maggio
- Patrick Murrell (State political reporter)
- Jack Pirie
- Samantha Butler
- Ashleigh Paholek
- Brendan Crew
- Sophie Jacobsen
- Steph Baumgartel
- Rob Waters (Sport)
- Caty Price (Sport)
- Nick Butler (Sport)
- Adrian Franklin (Sport)
- Sam Mills (News and Sport)

==== Former presenters ====
News

- Barry McQueen
- Geoff Raymond
- Colin McEwan
- Ralphe Neill
- Bruce Mansfield (1974–1979)
- Annette Allison (1979)
- Michael Schildberger (1979)
- David Johnston (1980–1995)
- Jana Wendt (1980–1981)
- Jo Pearson (1982–1987, 1991–1993)
- Tracey Curro (1988–90)
- Marie-Louise Theile (1994–1995)
- Jennifer Hansen (1996–2005)
- Mal Walden (1996–2013)
- Helen Kapalos (2006–2012)
- Stephen Quartermain (2013–2018)

Sports

- Bruce McAvaney (1983–1989)
- Eddie McGuire (1986–1993)
- Nathan Templeton (2009–2012)
- Brad McEwan (1999–2003, 2013–2018)

Weather

- Briony Behets (1976)
- Christine Broadway
- Rob Gell (late 1970s – 1987)
- David Brown (1988–1994)
- Adam Digby
- Mike Larkan (1992–2020)
- Kate Freebairn (2020–2022)

== See also ==
- Television broadcasting in Australia
