= Tonight in Canberra =

Tonight in Canberra is a short-lived Australian television series which aired in 1968 on Canberra station CTC-7. Running from April to August, it aired Mondays at 10:05PM. The series presented a mix of interviews and variety acts, hosted by David Brice and assisted by Steve Liebmann. One episode featured an interview with Christmas card designer Gordon Fraser and another interview with an inspector for the RSPCA, while a different episode featured an interview with NSW Minister for Lands, Tom Lewis, and another with the chairman of the ACT Advisory Council, Jim Pead.

== See also ==
- In Melbourne Tonight
- Adelaide Tonight
- Sydney Tonight
