= Jonathan Daly =

American actor

- Born: Jonathan Daly; January 14, 1942 (age 84); Chicago, Illinois, U.S.
- Occupations: Television actor, writer
- Years active: 1963–present
- Children: Rad Daly, Jules Daly

Jonathan Daly (born January 14, 1942) is an American actor who is known in America for his roles in Petticoat Junction, The Jimmy Stewart Show, and C.P.O. Sharkey, and best known in Australia for being in the comedy duo "Delo and Daly".

== Delo and Daly ==
In the 1960s, Daly formed the comedy team "Delo and Daly" with Ken Delo (later of The Lawrence Welk Show). They became friends while in the US Army, and began by performing at military shows. They became quite popular in Australia. They appeared as guests on In Melbourne Tonight, which was similar to America's The Tonight Show, and later had their own Australian television variety show The Delo and Daly Show (1963–64), which featured Australian and American performers. Daly also hosted the television interview show Daly at Night in Melbourne.

== American television ==
Daly first appeared on American television in guest roles in such series as Bewitched, The Flying Nun, and The Ghost & Mrs. Muir. His first regular character role was in Petticoat Junction, where he played game warden Orrin Pike, the love interest of Bobbie Jo Bradley (played by Lori Saunders). He later starred as Jimmy Stewart's adult son Peter Howard in The Jimmy Stewart Show, and as Don Rickles' immediate superior officer Lieutenant Whipple in the 1970s series C.P.O. Sharkey. Daly has more recently appeared in Law & Order: Trial by Jury.

== Movies ==
Daly had starring roles in the 1966 beach party movie Out of Sight, and the 1967 World War II film The Young Warriors both for Universal Pictures. He filmed an unsuccessful slapstick comedy television pilot with Joan Staley called The Clumbsys. Daly also appeared in the Walt Disney live action films Superdad, The Strongest Man in the World, The Shaggy D.A., and Amy.

== Writer ==
Daly wrote for the 1975 Andy Griffith series Adams of Eagle Lake.
