= The Delo and Daly Show =

Australian television series

- Genre: Variety
- Presented by: Ken Delo; Jonathan Daly
- Country of origin: Australia
- Original language: English

Original release
- Release: 1963 – 1964

The Delo and Daly Show is an Australian variety television series.

== Release ==
It aired from 1963 to 1964, and was produced by HSV-7. It was hosted by American comedy duo Ken Delo and Jonathan Daly, who had previously appeared as guests on In Melbourne Tonight. The guests on their series included a mix of Australian and American performers.

Jonathan Daly had previously been host on Daly at Night.
