= 2016 Hawthorn Football Club season =

92nd season in the Australian Football League

Hawthorn Football Club
2016 season
- President: Andrew Newbold (until 2 February 2016); Richard Garvey (from 2 February 2016)
- Coach: Alastair Clarkson
- Captain: Luke Hodge
- Home ground: Melbourne Cricket Ground; Aurora Stadium
- AFL season: 17–5 (3rd)
- Finals series: Semi-finals (lost to Western Bulldogs 84–107)
- Best and Fairest: Sam Mitchell
- Leading goalkicker: Jack Gunston (51)
- Highest home attendance: 87,823 (Semi-final vs. Western Bulldogs)
- Lowest home attendance: 10,121 (Round 14 vs. Gold Coast)
- Average home attendance: 41,065

The 2016 season was the Hawthorn Football Club's 92nd season in the Australian Football League and 115th overall, the 17th season playing home games at the Melbourne Cricket Ground, the 16th season playing home games at Aurora Stadium, the 12th season under head coach Alastair Clarkson, and the 6th season with Luke Hodge as club captain. Hawthorn entered the season as the three-time defending AFL premiers, having won back-to-back-to-back AFL premierships.

Hawthorn improved on its 16–6 record in 2015, finishing in 3rd with a 17–5 record. The 19 point win over Carlton in round 19 clinched a finals series appearance for the 7th consecutive season. The 1 point win over Collingwood in round 23 clinched a double chance for the 6th consecutive season.

Hawthorn were defeated by Geelong 83–85 in the qualifying final. Isaac Smith had the chance to win the game with a goal after the siren but hooked the kick right of the goal. This ended a three-game finals winning streak. It was also the second consecutive season Hawthorn were defeated in the Qualifying final. Hawthorn were eliminated from the finals by the eventual premiers Western Bulldogs 84–107 in the semi-final, ending their chances of a four-peat, the second four-peat in VFL/AFL history after Collingwood (1927–1930), and the first four-peat in the AFL era. Hawthorn became the 6th team since the introduction of the AFL final eight system to be eliminated in straight-sets, joining Port Adelaide (2001), West Coast (2007), Geelong and Fremantle (2014), and Sydney (2015). This was the first time since 2010 Hawthorn didn't win a final, the first time since 2010 Hawthorn didn't advance to the preliminary final, and the first time since 2011 Hawthorn didn't advance to the AFL Grand Final.

== Club summary ==
The 2016 AFL season is the 120th season of the VFL/AFL competition since its inception in 1897; having entered the competition in 1925, it was the 92nd season contested by the Hawthorn Football Club. Tasmania and iiNet continued as the club's two major sponsors, as they had done since 2006 and 2013 respectively, while Adidas continued to manufacture the club's on-and-off field apparel, as they had done since 2013. Hawthorn continued its alignment with the Box Hill Hawks Football Club in the Victorian Football League, allowing Hawthorn-listed players to play with the Box Hill Hawks when not selected in AFL matches.

== Senior personnel ==
Alastair Clarkson continued as the club's head coach for the twelfth consecutive season, while Luke Hodge continued as the club's captain for the sixth consecutive season. Both have held their respective positions since 2005 and 2011, respectively.

There were several changes to the coaching panel following the end of last season, the most notable of which was Brendon Bolton's departure from the club towards the end of the season to become the head coach of the Carlton Football Club. On 20 October 2015, recent Richmond retiree Chris Newman joined the club as a development coach, replacing Damian Carroll who was promoted to assistant coach alongside Alastair Clarkson.

On 2 February 2016, Andrew Newbold stepped down as the club's president, and was replaced in the role by vice-captain Richard Garvey.

== Playing list changes ==
The following lists all player changes between the conclusion of the 2015 season and the beginning of the 2016 season.

=== Trades ===
16 October 2015	To Hawthorn Pick 15, 2015 AFL draft Pick 55, 2015 AFL draft	To North Melbourne Jed Anderson; Pick 38, 2015 AFL draft Pick 40, 2015 AFL draft
21 October 2015	To Hawthorn Jack Fitzpatrick	To Melbourne Pick 94, 2015 AFL draft
22 October 2015	To Hawthorn Pick 48, 2015 AFL draft	To Greater Western Sydney Pick 55, 2015 AFL draft Pick 58, 2015 AFL draft

=== Free Agency ===
==== Departures ====
Date	Player	Type	2016 team	Deal	Compensation	Ref
10 October 2015	Matt Suckling	UFA	Western Bulldogs	Signed 3-year deal	End of 2nd round pick, 2015 AFL draft	

=== Draft ===
==== AFL draft ====
Round	Overall pick	Player	Recruited from	ref
1	19	Ryan Burton	North Adelaide	
1	22	Kieran Lovell	Tigers FC	
3	44	Blake Hardwick	Eastern Ranges	

==== Rookie draft ====
Round	Overall pick	Player	Recruited from	ref
1	18	Luke Surman	Norwood	
2	36	Kade Stewart	South Fremantle	
3	52	Alex Woodward (Note: Woodward was originally delisted by Hawthorn on 8 October 2015 but was re-drafted as a rookie)	Hawthorn	
4	62	Conor Glass	Derry GAA	

=== Retirements and delistings ===
Date	Player	2016 team	Reason	Ref
6 October 2015	Brian Lake	N/A	Retired	
6 October 2015	David Hale	N/A	Retired	
8 October 2015	Sam Grimley	Essendon	Delisted	
8 October 2015	Jared Hardisty	N/A	Delisted	
8 October 2015	Jonathan Simpkin	Essendon	Delisted	

== 2016 player squad ==
2016 Hawthorn Football Club squad
Senior list		Rookie list	Coaching staff
2 Jarryd Roughead (VC) (vet); 3 Jordan Lewis (VC) (vet); 4 Billy Hartung; 5 Sam Mitchell (vet); 6 Josh Gibson; 7 Ben McEvoy; 8 Taylor Duryea; 9 Shaun Burgoyne; 10 Brad Hill; 11 Brendan Whitecross; 12 James Frawley; 13 Jonathan O'Rourke; 14 Grant Birchall; 15 Luke Hodge (C) (vet); 16 Isaac Smith; 17 Angus Litherland; 18 Jonathon Ceglar; 19 Jack Gunston; 20 Dallas Willsmore; 21 James Sicily	22 Luke Breust; 23 Tim O'Brien; 24 Ben Stratton; 25 Ryan Schoenmakers; 26 Liam Shiels; 27 Matthew Spangher; 28 Paul Puopolo; 29 Will Langford; 30 Kaiden Brand; 31 Zac Webster; 32 Jack Fitzpatrick; 33 Cyril Rioli; 34 Kurt Heatherley; 35 Ryan Burton; 36 Kieran Lovell; 37 Blake Hardwick; 41 Daniel Howe; 42 Teia Miles; 43 Marc Pittonet	38 Luke Surman; 39 Alex Woodward; 40 Kade Stewart; 44 Conor Glass (B); 45 Jermaine Miller-Lewis; 46 Lachlan Langford; 47 Shem-Kalvin Tatupu (ret)	Head coach: Alastair Clarkson; Assistant coaches: Brett Ratten (stoppages coach); Cameron Bruce (midfield coach); Adem Yze (backline coach); Damian Monkhorst (ruck coach); Damian Carroll (forward coach); Rob McCartney (development coach); Chris Newman (development coach); David Neitz (key position coach); Legend: (c) Captain(s); (vc) Vice-captain(s); Long-term injury list; Upgraded rookie(s); (vet) Veteran's list; (ret) Retired; (B) Category B rookie; Updated: 28 July 2016; Source(s): HFC Website; Coaches

== Season summary ==
=== Pre-season matches ===
The club played three practice matches as part of the 2016 NAB Challenge, and will be played under modified pre-season rules, including nine-point goals. They finished the NAB Challenge with a record of 2–1, defeating Carlton and North Melbourne on either side of a heavy loss to Richmond.

Rd	Date and local time	Opponent	Scores (Hawthorn's scores indicated in bold)			Venue
Rd	Date and local time	Opponent	Home	Away	Result	Venue
1	Thursday, 18 February (7:10 pm)	Carlton	**0.8.5 (53)**	0.4.8 (32)	Won by 21 points	Aurora Stadium (H)
2	Saturday, 27 February (4:40 pm)	Richmond	1.15.5 (104)	**0.4.9 (33)**	Lost by 71 points	Holm Park Recreation Reserve (A)
3	Saturday, 12 March (7:10 pm)	North Melbourne	**2.16.11 (125)**	0.12.8 (80)	Won by 45 points	Etihad Stadium (H)

=== Premiership season ===
==== Fixture summary ====
The full fixture was announced on 29 October 2015. The Melbourne Cricket Ground once again acted as Hawthorn's primary home ground, hosting seven of the club's eleven home games, while four games were played at their secondary home ground, Aurora Stadium, in Launceston. The club's four games at Aurora Stadium were against St Kilda, Fremantle, Gold Coast and Carlton in rounds 4, 8, 14 and 19 respectively, while the club played the West Coast Eagles, North Melbourne, Sydney, Richmond and Melbourne twice during the regular season.

For the second consecutive year, and the third in the past four years, the club opened its season with an Easter Monday clash against Geelong at the Melbourne Cricket Ground; it was also the first time since 2011 in which it started a season with an away match, and, due to the weighted rule, it was the only time the two teams met during the regular season. Its first home game came the following round, when they faced the West Coast Eagles at the Melbourne Cricket Ground in the 2015 AFL Grand Final rematch. Their match against Greater Western Sydney, scheduled for Round 6, was once again played at Spotless Stadium in Sydney, while the club travelled to the Gabba for the first time since 2008 to take on the Brisbane Lions in the AFL's Indigenous Round. In addition, the club also played consecutive Thursday night away matches against Port Adelaide and Sydney in Rounds 16 and 17 respectively, and played six Friday night matches throughout the regular season, the equal most of any club.

==== Fixture ====
Rd	Date and local time	Opponent	Scores (Hawthorn's scores indicated in bold)			Venue	Record	Report
Rd	Date and local time	Opponent	Home	Away	Result	Venue	Record	Report
1	Monday, 28 March (3:20 pm)	Geelong	18.8 (116)	**12.14 (86)**	Lost by 30 points	Melbourne Cricket Ground (A)	0–1	Report
2	Sunday, 3 April (3:20 pm)	West Coast	**14.15 (99)**	7.11 (53)	Won by 46 points	Melbourne Cricket Ground (H)	1–1	Report
3	Sunday, 10 April (3:20 pm)	Western Bulldogs	13.12 (90)	**14.9 (93)**	Won by 3 points	Etihad Stadium (A)	2–1	Report
4	Saturday, 16 April (2:10 pm)	St Kilda	**13.9 (87)**	13.6 (84)	Won by 3 points	Aurora Stadium (H)	3–1	Report
5	Friday, 22 April (7:50 pm)	Adelaide	**17.10 (112)**	17.7 (109)	Won by 3 points	Melbourne Cricket Ground (H)	4–1	Report
6	Saturday, 30 April (4:35 pm)	Greater Western Sydney	24.14 (158)	**12.11 (83)**	Lost by 75 points	Spotless Stadium (A)	4–2	Report
7	Friday, 6 May (7:50 pm)	Richmond	13.12 (90)	**21.10 (136)**	Won by 46 points	Melbourne Cricket Ground (A)	5–2	Report
8	Saturday, 14 May (2:10 pm)	Fremantle	**17.14 (116)**	11.9 (75)	Won by 41 points	Aurora Stadium (H)	6–2	Report
9	Friday, 20 May (7:50 pm)	Sydney	**7.13 (55)**	10.9 (69)	Lost by 14 points	Melbourne Cricket Ground (H)	6–3	Report
10	Saturday, May 28 (1:45 pm)	Brisbane Lions	13.9 (87)	**21.9 (135)**	Won by 48 points	The Gabba (A)	7–3	Report
11	Saturday, 4 June (1:45 pm)	Melbourne	**11.16 (82)**	10.4 (64)	Won by 18 points	Melbourne Cricket Ground (H)	8–3	Report
12	Friday, 10 June (7:50 pm)	Essendon	6.7 (43)	**23.13 (151)**	Won by 108 points	Etihad Stadium (A)	9–3	Report
13	Friday, 17 June (7:50 pm)	North Melbourne	11.18 (84)	**14.9 (93)**	Won by 9 points	Etihad Stadium (A)	10–3	Report
14	Sunday, 26 June (3:20 pm)	Gold Coast	**12.14 (86)**	8.12 (60)	Won by 26 points	Aurora Stadium (H)	11–3	Report
15	Bye							
16	Thursday, 7 July (7:20 pm)	Port Adelaide	12.7 (79)	**15.11 (101)**	Won by 22 points	Adelaide Oval (A)	12–3	Report
17	Thursday, 14 July (7:20 pm)	Sydney	10.10 (70)	**11.9 (75)**	Won by 5 points	Sydney Cricket Ground (A)	13–3	Report
18	Sunday, 24 July (3:20 pm)	Richmond	**16.18 (114)**	5.14 (44)	Won by 70 points	Melbourne Cricket Ground (H)	14–3	Report
19	Saturday, 30 July (2:10 pm)	Carlton	**10.14 (74)**	7.13 (55)	Won by 19 points	Aurora Stadium (H)	15–3	Report
20	Saturday, 6 August (2:10 pm)	Melbourne	17.8 (110)	**11.15 (81)**	Lost by 29 points	Melbourne Cricket Ground (A)	15–4	Report
21	Saturday, 13 August (2:10 pm)	North Melbourne	**14.12 (96)**	8.9 (57)	Won by 39 points	Melbourne Cricket Ground (H)	16–4	Report
22	Friday, 19 August (6:10 pm)	West Coast	13.14 (92)	**10.7 (67)**	Lost by 25 points	Domain Stadium (A)	16–5	Report
23	Sunday, 28 August (3:20 pm)	Collingwood	**17.10 (112)**	17.9 (111)	Won by 1 point	Melbourne Cricket Ground (H)	17–5	Report

==== Ladder ====
Pos	Team	Pld	W	L	D	PF	PA	PP	Pts	Qualification
1	Sydney	22	17	5	0	2221	1469	151.2	68	2016 finals
2	Geelong	22	17	5	0	2235	1554	143.8	68	2016 finals
**3**	Hawthorn	**22**	**17**	**5**	**0**	**2134**	**1800**	**118.6**	68	2016 finals
4	Greater Western Sydney	22	16	6	0	2380	1663	143.1	64	2016 finals
5	Adelaide	22	16	6	0	2483	1795	138.3	64	2016 finals
6	West Coast	22	16	6	0	2181	1678	130.0	64	2016 finals
7	Western Bulldogs (P)	22	15	7	0	1857	1609	115.4	60	2016 finals
8	North Melbourne	22	12	10	0	1956	1859	105.2	48	2016 finals
9	St Kilda	22	12	10	0	1953	2041	95.7	48	
10	Port Adelaide	22	10	12	0	2055	1939	106.0	40	
11	Melbourne	22	10	12	0	1944	1991	97.6	40	
12	Collingwood	22	9	13	0	1910	1998	95.6	36	
13	Richmond	22	8	14	0	1713	2155	79.5	32	
14	Carlton	22	7	15	0	1568	1978	79.3	28	
15	Gold Coast	22	6	16	0	1778	2273	78.2	24	
16	Fremantle	22	4	18	0	1574	2119	74.3	16	
17	Brisbane Lions	22	3	19	0	1770	2872	61.6	12	
18	Essendon	22	3	19	0	1437	2356	61.0	12	

Source: AFL
Rules for classification: 1) points; 2) percentage; 3) number of points for.
(P) Premiers

==== Finals ====
Rd	Date and local time	Opponent	Scores (Hawthorn's scores indicated in bold)			Venue	Recap
Rd	Date and local time	Opponent	Home	Away	Result	Venue	Recap
Qualifying final	Friday, 9 September (7:50 pm)	Geelong	12.13 (85)	**12.11 (83)**	Lost by 2 points	Melbourne Cricket Ground (A)	Recap
Semi-final	Friday, 16 September (7:50 pm)	Western Bulldogs	**12.12 (84)**	16.11 (107)	Lost by 23 points	Melbourne Cricket Ground (H)	Recap

== Awards, records and milestones ==
=== Awards ===
- Peter Crimmins Medal
  - Sam Mitchell
- 2016 All-Australian team
  - Cyril Rioli
- Round 13
  - James Sicily – 2016 AFL Rising Star nominee

=== Records ===
- Round 11:
  - Hawthorn made 109 tackles in its win over Melbourne, which is the highest number of tackles it has ever recorded in an AFL premiership match.
- Round 20:
  - Hawthorn's 29-point loss to Melbourne ended a 13-game winning streak against that club dating back to Round 2, 2007.

=== Milestones ===
- Round 1:
  - Marc Pittonet – AFL debut
  - Paul Puopolo – 100th AFL goal
- Round 2:
  - Josh Gibson – 1st AFL goal for Hawthorn
- Round 4:
  - Sam Mitchell – most possessions in a single match in his career (44)
- Round 5:
  - Shaun Burgoyne – 300th AFL game
- Round 6:
  - Kieran Lovell – AFL debut
  - Daniel Howe – first AFL goal
- Round 7:
  - Kaiden Brand – AFL debut
- Round 10:
  - Jordan Lewis – 250th AFL game
- Round 11:
  - Josh Gibson – 200th AFL game
  - Kade Stewart – AFL debut
- Round 12:
  - Shaun Burgoyne – 150th club game for Hawthorn
  - Luke Breust – 250th AFL goal
  - Jack Gunston – 250th AFL goal
- Round 16:
  - Cyril Rioli – 250th AFL goal
- Round 17:
  - Shaun Burgoyne – 250th AFL goal
- Round 18:
  - Sam Mitchell – 300th AFL game
- Round 19:
  - Blake Hardwick – AFL debut
- Round 20:
  - Kurt Heatherley – AFL debut
- Round 21:
  - Ryan Burton – AFL debut
- Round 22:
  - Jonathon Ceglar – 50th AFL game
- Round 23:
  - Jack Fitzpatrick – first AFL game for Hawthorn (previously with Melbourne)
- Qualifying Final
  - Ryan Schoenmakers – 100th AFL game

== Brownlow Medal ==
=== Results ===
Round	1 vote	2 votes	3 votes
1	Sam Mitchell (Hawthorn)	Joel Selwood (Geelong)	Patrick Dangerfield (Geelong)
2	Cyril Rioli (Hawthorn)	Sam Mitchell (Hawthorn)	Josh Gibson (Hawthorn)
3	Sam Mitchell (Hawthorn)	Marcus Adams (Western Bulldogs)	Luke Dahlhaus (Western Bulldogs)
4	Nick Riewoldt (St Kilda	David Armitage (St Kilda)	Sam Mitchell (Hawthorn)
5	Cyril Rioli (Hawthorn)	Scott Thompson (Adelaide)	Paul Puopolo (Hawthorn)
6	Steve Johnson (Greater Western Sydney)	Callan Ward (Greater Western Sydney)	Rory Lobb (Greater Western Sydney)
7	Luke Breust (Hawthorn)	Jack Gunston (Hawthorn)	Jordan Lewis (Hawthorn)
8	Josh Gibson (Hawthorn)	Isaac Smith (Hawthorn)	Lachie Neale (Fremantle)
9	Jack Gunston (Hawthorn)	Luke Parker (Sydney)	Dan Hannebery (Sydney)
10	Josh Gibson (Hawthorn)	Cyril Rioli (Hawthorn)	Jordan Lewis (Hawthorn)
11	Nathan Jones (Melbourne)	Josh Gibson (Hawthorn)	Bernie Vince (Melbourne)
12	Jack Gunston (Hawthorn)	Grant Birchall (Hawthorn)	Jordan Lewis (Hawthorn)
13	Jordan Lewis (Hawthorn)	Daniel Wells (North Melbourne)	James Sicily (Hawthorn)
14	Tom Lynch (Gold Coast)	Sam Mitchell (Hawthorn)	Gary Ablett, Jr. (Gold Coast)
15	Bye		
16	Robbie Gray (Port Adelaide)	Cyril Rioli (Hawthorn)	Luke Hodge (Hawthorn)
17	Josh Kennedy (Sydney)	Sam Mitchell (Hawthorn)	Shaun Burgoyne (Hawthorn)
18	Dustin Martin (Richmond)	Sam Mitchell (Hawthorn)	Josh Gibson (Hawthorn)
19	Jordan Lewis (Hawthorn)	Patrick Cripps (Carlton)	Shaun Burgoyne (Hawthorn)
20	Cyril Rioli (Hawthorn)	Max Gawn (Melbourne)	Jack Viney (Melbourne)
21	Andrew Swallow (North Melbourne)	Isaac Smith (Hawthorn)	Sam Mitchell (Hawthorn)
22	Jeremy McGovern (West Coast)	Josh Kennedy (West Coast)	Andrew Gaff (West Coast)
23	Cyril Rioli (Hawthorn)	Shaun Burgoyne (Hawthorn)	Adam Treloar (Collingwood)

=== Brownlow Medal tally ===
Player	1 vote games	2 vote games	3 vote games	Total votes
Sam Mitchell	3	2	3	16
Jordan Lewis	1	1	3	11
Josh Gibson	3	1	1	10
Shaun Burgoyne	0	2	2	8
Cyril Rioli	4	2	0	8
Jack Gunston	2	1	0	4
Isaac Smith	0	2	0	4
Luke Hodge	0	0	1	3
Paul Puopolo	0	0	1	3
James Sicily	0	0	1	3
Grant Birchall	0	1	0	2
Luke Breust	1	0	0	1
Total	14	12	12	73

- italics denotes ineligible player

== Tribunal cases ==
Player	Round	Charge category	Verdict	Result	Victim	Club	Ref(s)
Ben Stratton	1	Striking	Not Guilty	Cleared	Cory Gregson	Geelong	
Grant Birchall	3	Rough conduct	Guilty	Fine	Jordan Roughead	Western Bulldogs	
Ben Stratton	6	Rough Conduct	Not Guilty	Cleared	Nathan Wilson	Greater Western Sydney	
Luke Hodge	6	Rough Conduct	Not Guilty	Cleared	Nathan Wilson	Greater Western Sydney	
Taylor Duryea	8	Striking	Guilty	Fine	Hayden Ballantyne	Fremantle	
Sam Mitchell	9	Striking	Not Guilty	Cleared	Dan Hannebery	Sydney	
Jordan Lewis	10	High Contact	Not Guilty	Cleared	Nick Robertson	Brisbane Lions	
Jonathon Ceglar	11	Striking	Guilty	1 week	Jesse Hogan	Melbourne	
Bradley Hill	13	Melee	Guilty	Fine		North Melbourne	
Paul Puopolo	13	Melee	Guilty	Fine		North Melbourne	
Isaac Smith	13	Wrestling	Guilty	Fine	Michael Firrito	North Melbourne	
Daniel Howe	13	Striking	Guilty	Fine	Drew Petrie	North Melbourne	
Luke Hodge	17	Rough conduct	Guilty	Fine	Callum Sinclair	Sydney	
Cyril Rioli	20	Rough conduct	Guilty	Fine	Clayton Oliver	Melbourne	
James Sicily	20	Striking	Guilty	1 week	Bernie Vince	Melbourne	
Sam Mitchell	20	Striking	Not Guilty	Cleared	Jack Watts	Melbourne	
Luke Hodge	21	Wrestling	Guilty	Fine	Michael Firrito	North Melbourne	
Jordan Lewis	22	Striking	Not Guilty	Cleared	Scott Lycett	West Coast	
Josh Gibson	23	High Contact	Not Guilty	Cleared	Levi Greenwood	Collingwood	
Jordan Lewis	Qualifying final	Striking	Not Guilty	Cleared	Joel Selwood	Geelong	
Luke Hodge	Qualifying final	Striking	Not Guilty	Cleared	Joel Selwood	Geelong	
Cyril Rioli	Semi final	Melee	Guilty	Fine		Western Bulldogs	
James Sicily	Semi final	Melee	Guilty	Fine		Western Bulldogs	
