= 2012 Hawthorn Football Club season =

88th season in the Australian Football League

Hawthorn Football Club
2012 season
- President: Andrew Newbold
- Coach: Alastair Clarkson
- Captain: Luke Hodge
- Home ground: Melbourne Cricket Ground; Aurora Stadium
- Pre-season competition: 3rd
- AFL season: 17–5 (1st)
- Finals Series: Grand Final (lost to Sydney 81–91)
- Best and Fairest: Sam Mitchell
- Leading goalkicker: Lance Franklin (69)
- Highest home attendance: 99,683 (Grand Final vs. Sydney)
- Lowest home attendance: 12,959 (Round 8 vs. Fremantle)
- Average home attendance: 44,973

The 2012 season was the Hawthorn Football Club's 88th season in the Australian Football League and 111th overall.

The season would prove to be Hawthorn's most dominant season in the 2012-2015 run of consecutive successful years, only to be denied the ultimate success in the 2012 AFL Grand Final due to inaccurate kicking.

== Playing list changes ==
The following lists all player changes between the conclusion of the 2011 season and the beginning of the 2012 season.

=== Trades ===
12 October 2011	To Hawthorn Jack Gunston; Pick 52, 2011 AFL draft Pick 71, 2011 AFL draft	To Adelaide Pick 24, 2011 AFL draft Pick 46, 2011 AFL draft Pick 64, 2011 AFL draft
14 October 2011	To Hawthorn Pick 58, 2011 AFL draft	To North Melbourne Will Sierakowski
14 October 2011	To Hawthorn Pick 33, 2011 AFL draft	To Port Adelaide Brent Renouf
17 October 2011	To Hawthorn Pick 29, 2011 AFL draft	To Brisbane Lions Jordan Lisle
17 October 2011	To Hawthorn Pick 38, 2011 AFL draft Pick 56, 2011 AFL draft	To Fremantle Pick 29, 2011 AFL draft Pick 58, 2011 AFL draft Pick 71, 2011 AFL draft
17 October 2011	To Hawthorn Jarrad Boumann	To Greater Western Sydney Pick 56, 2011 AFL draft

=== Draft ===
==== AFL draft ====
Round	Overall pick	Player	Recruited from	ref
2	33	Bradley Hill	West Perth	
2	38	Jordan Kelly	Dandenong Stingrays	
3	53	Alex Woodward	Sandringham Dragons	
4	77	Luke Breust (Rookie promotion)		

==== Rookie draft ====
Round	Overall pick	Player	Recruited from	ref
1	16	Broc McCauley	Brisbane Lions	
2	34	Amos Frank	Woodville-West Torrens	
3	52	Andrew Boseley	Geelong Falcons	
4	69	Adam Pattison	Box Hill Hawks	

=== Retirements and delistings ===
Date	Player	2012 team	Reason	Ref
20 October 2011	Rick Ladson	—N/a	Delisted	
20 October 2011	Jack Mahony	—N/a	Delisted	
20 October 2011	Sam Menegola	Fremantle	Delisted	
20 October 2011	Riley Milne	—N/a	Delisted	
20 October 2011	Jordan Williams	—N/a	Delisted	

== 2012 player squad ==
2012 Hawthorn Football Club squad
Senior list		Rookie list	Coaching staff
2 Jarryd Roughead (VC); 3 Jordan Lewis (VC); 4 Matt Suckling; 5 Sam Mitchell; 6 Josh Gibson; 7 Michael Osborne (vet); 8 Xavier Ellis; 9 Shaun Burgoyne; 10 Chance Bateman (vet); 11 Clinton Young; 12 Brad Sewell; 13 Kyle Cheney; 14 Grant Birchall; 15 Luke Hodge (C); 16 Isaac Smith; 17 Cameron Bruce (ret); 18 Brent Guerra; 19 Jack Gunston; 20 David Hale; 21 Shane Savage	22 Luke Breust; 23 Lance Franklin; 24 Ben Stratton; 25 Ryan Schoenmakers; 26 Liam Shiels; 27 Stephen Gilham; 28 Paul Puopolo; 29 Tom Murphy; 30 Luke Lowden; 31 Jarrad Boumann; 32 Bradley Hill; 33 Cyril Rioli; 34 Jordan Kelly; 35 Sam Grimley; 36 Alex Woodward; 37 Brendan Whitecross; 38 Mitch Hallahan; 39 Max Bailey; 41 Taylor Duryea; 42 Angus Litherland	40 Broc McCauley; 43 Amos Frank; 44 Andrew Boseley; 45 Tom Schneider; 46 Derick Wanganeen; 47 Adam Pattison; 48 Will Langford	Head coach: Alastair Clarkson; Assistant coaches: Leon Cameron (Forward); Adam Yze (Forward); Brendon Bolton (Midfield); Adam Simpson (Midfield); Luke Beveridge (Defence); Damian Monkhorst (Ruck); Legend: (c) Captain(s); (vc) Vice-captain(s); Long-term injury list; Upgraded rookie(s); (vet) Veteran's list; (ret) Retired; Updated: 25 July 2012; Source(s): HFC Website; Coaches

== Fixture ==
=== NAB Cup ===
Rd	Date and local time	Opponent	Scores (Hawthorn's scores indicated in bold)			Venue	Attendance
Rd	Date and local time	Opponent	Home	Away	Result	Venue	Attendance
1	Friday, 17 February (7:50 pm)	North Melbourne	0.4.4 (28)	**1.6.8 (53)**	Won by 25 points	Etihad Stadium	28,228
1	Friday, 17 February (8:55 pm)	Richmond	**0.5.7 (37)**	0.6.4 (40)	Lost by 3 points	Etihad Stadium	–
2	Saturday, 3 March (3:40 pm)	Greater Western Sydney	**2.12.18 (108)**	0.4.10 (34)	Won by 74 points	Aurora Stadium (H)	5,100
3	Saturday, 10 March (5:40 pm)	Melbourne	0.6.8 (44)	**1.17.12 (123)**	Won by 79 points	Etihad Stadium (A)	10,611

=== Premiership season ===
Rd	Date and local time	Opponent	Scores (Hawthorn's scores indicated in bold)			Venue	TV	Attendance	Record	Report
Rd	Date and local time	Opponent	Home	Away	Result	Venue	TV	Attendance	Record	Report
1	Friday, 30 March (7:50 pm)	Collingwood	**20.17 (137)**	16.19 (115)	Won by 22 points	Melbourne Cricket Ground (H)	Seven	78,466	1–0	Report
2	Monday, 9 April (3:10 pm)	Geelong	14.8 (92)	**13.12 (90)**	Lost by 2 points	Melbourne Cricket Ground (A)	Seven	69,231	1–1	Report
3	Sunday, 15 April (3:15 pm)	Adelaide	**21.14 (140)**	12.12 (84)	Won by 56 points	Melbourne Cricket Ground (H)	Seven	33,524	2–1	Report
4	Saturday, 21 April (5:40 pm)	West Coast	5.21 (51)	**5.16 (46)**	Lost by 5 points	Patersons Stadium (A)	Seven	40,080	2–2	Report
5	Sunday, 29 April (1:10 pm)	Sydney	**10.9 (69)**	16.10 (106)	Lost by 37 points	Aurora Stadium (H)	Fox Footy	19,217	2–3	Report
6	Saturday, 5 May (7:40 pm)	St Kilda	13.10 (88)	**18.15 (123)**	Won by 35 points	Melbourne Cricket Ground (A)	Seven	42,290	3–3	Report
7	Friday, 11 May (7:50 pm)	Melbourne	6.13 (49)	**15.25 (115)**	Won by 66 points	Melbourne Cricket Ground (A)	Seven	36,430	4–3	Report
8	Saturday, 19 May (2:10 pm)	Fremantle	**17.17 (119)**	9.9 (63)	Won by 56 points	Aurora Stadium (H)	Fox Footy	12,959	5–3	Report
9	Saturday, 26 May (1:45 pm)	Richmond	21.11 (137)	**10.15 (75)**	Lost by 62 points	Melbourne Cricket Ground (A)	Seven	51,617	5–4	Report
10	Saturday, 2 June (2:10 pm)	North Melbourne	**27.12 (174)**	9.5 (59)	Won by 115 points	Aurora Stadium (H)	Fox Footy	16,143	6–4	Report
11	Sunday, 10 June (4:10 pm)	Port Adelaide	9.8 (62)	**16.12 (108)**	Won by 46 points	AAMI Stadium (A)	Fox Footy	26,638	7–4	Report
12	Sunday, 17 June (1:10 pm)	Brisbane Lions	**19.21 (135)**	11.4 (70)	Won by 65 points	Melbourne Cricket Ground (H)	Fox Footy	35,492	8–4	Report
13	Bye									
14	Friday, 29 June (7:50 pm)	Carlton	10.10 (70)	**18.12 (120)**	Won by 50 points	Melbourne Cricket Ground (A)	Seven	65,047	9–4	Report
15	Sunday, 8 July (1:10 pm)	Greater Western Sydney	**28.25 (193)**	4.7 (31)	Won by 162 points	Melbourne Cricket Ground (H)	Fox Footy	26,518	10–4	Report
16	Sunday, 15 July (3:15 pm)	Western Bulldogs	6.8 (44)	**17.14 (116)**	Won by 72 points	Etihad Stadium (A)	Seven	24,754	11–4	Report
17	Saturday, 21 July (1:45 pm)	Collingwood	13.13 (91)	**21.12 (138)**	Won by 47 points	Melbourne Cricket Ground (A)	Seven	83,714	12–4	Report
18	Friday, 27 July (7:50 pm)	Essendon	12.14 (86)	**27.18 (180)**	Won by 94 points	Etihad Stadium (A)	Seven	44,899	13–4	Report
19	Friday, 3 August (7:50 pm)	Geelong	**17.14 (116)**	18.10 (118)	Lost by 2 points	Melbourne Cricket Ground (H)	Seven	65,287	13–5	Report
20	Sunday, 12 August (1:10 pm)	Port Adelaide	**24.15 (159)**	13.9 (87)	Won by 72 points	Aurora Stadium (H)	Fox Footy	14,431	14–5	Report
21	Sunday, 19 August (4:40 pm)	Gold Coast	**19.15 (129)**	10.5 (65)	Won by 64 points	Melbourne Cricket Ground (H)	Fox Footy	23,098	15–5	Report
22	Saturday, 25 August (4:40 pm)	Sydney	14.11 (95)	**15.12 (102)**	Won by 7 points	Sydney Cricket Ground (A)	Fox Footy	31,167	16–5	Report
23	Friday, 31 August (7:50 pm)	West Coast	**14.11 (95)**	10.10 (70)	Won by 25 points	Melbourne Cricket Ground (H)	Seven	50,023	17–5	Report

=== Ladder ===
2012 AFL ladder
Pos	Team	Pld	W	L	D	PF	PA	PP	Pts	
**1**	Hawthorn	**22**	**17**	**5**	**0**	**2679**	**1733**	**154.6**	68	Finals series
2	Adelaide	22	17	5	0	2428	1833	132.5	68	Finals series
3	Sydney (P)	22	16	6	0	2290	1629	140.6	64	Finals series
4	Collingwood	22	16	6	0	2123	1823	116.5	64	Finals series
5	West Coast	22	15	7	0	2244	1807	124.2	60	Finals series
6	Geelong	22	15	7	0	2209	1886	117.1	60	Finals series
7	Fremantle	22	14	8	0	1956	1691	115.7	56	Finals series
8	North Melbourne	22	14	8	0	2359	2097	112.5	56	Finals series
9	St Kilda	22	12	10	0	2347	1903	123.3	48	
10	Carlton	22	11	11	0	2079	1925	108.0	44	
11	Essendon	22	11	11	0	2091	2090	100.0	44	
12	Richmond	22	10	11	1	2169	1943	111.6	42	
13	Brisbane Lions	22	10	12	0	1904	2092	91.0	40	
14	Port Adelaide	22	5	16	1	1691	2144	78.9	22	
15	Western Bulldogs	22	5	17	0	1542	2301	67.0	20	
16	Melbourne	22	4	18	0	1580	2341	67.5	16	
17	Gold Coast	22	3	19	0	1509	2481	60.8	12	
18	Greater Western Sydney	22	2	20	0	1270	2751	46.2	8	

Rules for classification: 1) points; 2) percentage; 3) number of points for.
(P) Premiers

=== Finals series ===
Rd	Date and local time	Opponent	Scores (Hawthorn's scores indicated in bold)			Venue	TV	Attendance	Report
Rd	Date and local time	Opponent	Home	Away	Result	Venue	TV	Attendance	Report
Qualifying final	Friday, 7 September (7:50 pm)	Collingwood	**20.15 (135)**	15.7 (97)	Won by 38 points	Melbourne Cricket Ground (H)	Seven	85,639	Report
Semi-final	Advanced to Preliminary final								
Preliminary final	Saturday, 22 September (5:15 pm)	Adelaide	**13.19 (97)**	14.8 (92)	Won by 5 points	Melbourne Cricket Ground (H)	Seven	69,146	Report
Grand final	Saturday, 29 September (2:30 pm)	Sydney	**11.15 (81)**	14.7 (91)	Lost by 10 points	Melbourne Cricket Ground (H)	Seven	99,683	Report
