= 2010 Hawthorn Football Club season =

86th season in the Australian Football League

Hawthorn Football Club
2010 season
- President: Jeff Kennett
- Coach: Alastair Clarkson
- Captain: Sam Mitchell
- Home ground: Melbourne Cricket Ground; Aurora Stadium
- Pre-season competition: Quarter final
- AFL season: 12–9–1 (7th)
- Finals series: Elimination final (lost to Fremantle 64–94)
- Best and Fairest: Luke Hodge
- Leading goalkicker: Lance Franklin (64)
- Highest home attendance: 76,218 (Round 22 vs. Collingwood)
- Lowest home attendance: 15,532 (Round 21 vs. Fremantle)
- Average home attendance: 37,876

The 2010 season was the Hawthorn Football Club's 86th season in the Australian Football League and 109th overall.

== Playing list changes ==
The following lists all player changes between the conclusion of the 2009 season and the beginning of the 2010 season.

=== Trades ===
5 October 2009	To Hawthorn Josh Gibson; Pick 69, 2009 AFL draft	To North Melbourne Pick 25, 2009 AFL draft Pick 41, 2009 AFL draft
9 October 2009	To Hawthorn Pick 39, 2009 AFL draft Pick 46, 2009 AFL draft Pick 70, 2009 AFL draft	To Sydney Josh Kennedy; Ben McGlynn
9 October 2009	To Hawthorn Shaun Burgoyne (From Port Adelaide)	To Port Adelaide Jay Nash (From Essendon); Pick 9, 2009 AFL draft (From Hawthorn); Pick 16, 2009 AFL draft (From Essendon); Pick 97, 2009 AFL draft (From Geelong)
9 October 2009	To Essendon Mark Williams (From Hawthorn); Pick 24, 2009 AFL draft (From Port Adelaide); Pick 33, 2009 AFL draft (From Geelong)	To Geelong Pick 40, 2009 AFL draft (From Port Adelaide); Pick 42, 2009 AFL draft (From Essendon); Pick 56, 2009 AFL draft (From Port Adelaide)
9 October 2009	To Hawthorn Pick 58, 2009 AFL draft	To Essendon Pick 89, 2009 AFL draft

=== Draft ===
==== AFL draft ====
Round	Overall pick	Player	Recruited from	ref
3	39	Sam Grimley	Northern Knights	
3	46	Ben Stratton	East Perth	
4	57	Jordan Williams	Bendigo Pioneers	
4	58	Rhan Hooper	Brisbane Lions	
5	69	Taylor Duryea	Murray Bushrangers	
5	70	Matt Suckling (Promoted Rookie)		

==== Rookie draft ====
Round	Overall pick	Player	Recruited from	ref
1	13	Wayde Skipper	Western Bulldogs	
2	29	Jarrod Kayler-Thomson	Perth	
3	42	Michael Johnston	East Coast Eagles	

=== Retirements and delistings ===
Date	Player	2010 team	Reason	Ref
11 August 2009	Stuart Dew	—N/a	Retired	
7 September 2009	Tim Boyle	—N/a	Retired	
3 October 2009	Robert Campbell	—N/a	Retired	
28 October 2009	Mitch Thorp	—N/a	Delisted	
28 October 2009	Tim Walsh	—N/a	Delisted	
28 October 2009	Haydn Kiel	—N/a	Delisted	

== 2010 player squad ==
2010 Hawthorn Football Club squad
Senior list		Rookie list	Coaching staff
1 Max Bailey; 2 Jarryd Roughead; 3 Jordan Lewis; 4 Rick Ladson; 5 Sam Mitchell (C); 6 Josh Gibson; 7 Michael Osborne; 8 Xavier Ellis; 9 Shaun Burgoyne; 10 Chance Bateman; 11 Clinton Young; 12 Brad Sewell; 13 Simon Taylor; 14 Grant Birchall; 15 Luke Hodge (VC); 16 Beau Dowler; 17 Beau Muston; 18 Brent Guerra; 19 Jarryd Morton; 20 Rhan Hooper	21 Shane Savage; 22 Travis Tuck; 23 Lance Franklin; 24 Trent Croad (ret); 25 Ryan Schoenmakers; 26 Liam Shiels; 27 Stephen Gilham; 29 Thomas Murphy; 30 Campbell Brown; 31 Matt Suckling; 33 Cyril Rioli; 34 Brent Renouf; 35 Sam Grimley; 36 Jordan Lisle; 37 Brendan Whitecross; 38 Luke Lowden; 39 Ben Stratton; 40 Jordan Williams; 41 Taylor Duryea	28 Garry Moss; 32 Riley Milne; 42 Wayde Skipper; 43 Will Sierakowski; 44 Cameron Stokes; 45 Jarrod Kayler-Thomson; 46 Michael Johnston; 47 Luke Breust; 48 Carl Peterson	Head coach: Alastair Clarkson; Legend: (c) Captain(s); (vc) Vice-captain(s); (ret) Retired; Updated: 9 September 2010; Source(s): HFC Website; Coaches

== Fixture ==
=== NAB Cup ===
Rd	Date and local time	Opponent	Scores (Hawthorn's scores indicated in bold)			Venue	Attendance
Rd	Date and local time	Opponent	Home	Away	Result	Venue	Attendance
1	Saturday, 13 February (7:40 pm)	Richmond	**3.16.12 (135)**	0.9.8 (62)	Won by 73 points	Aurora Stadium (H)	11,217
Quarter final	Friday, 26 February (7:40 pm)	Western Bulldogs	**0.7.12 (54)**	1.15.12 (111)	Lost by 57 points	Etihad Stadium (H)	17,222

=== Premiership season ===
Rd	Date and local time	Opponent	Scores (Hawthorn's scores indicated in bold)			Venue	TV	Attendance	Record	Report
Rd	Date and local time	Opponent	Home	Away	Result	Venue	TV	Attendance	Record	Report
1	Saturday, 27 March (2:10 pm)	Melbourne	8.13 (61)	**17.15 (117)**	Won by 56 points	Melbourne Cricket Ground (A)	Fox Sports	45,615	1–0	Report
2	Monday, 5 April (2:10 pm)	Geelong	**13.13 (91)**	14.16 (100)	Lost by 9 points	Melbourne Cricket Ground (H)	Ten	68,628	1–1	Report
3	Sunday, 11 April (2:10 pm)	Western Bulldogs	14.16 (100)	**12.12 (84)**	Lost by 16 points	Etihad Stadium (A)	Seven	35,933	1–2	Report
4	Saturday, 17 April (2:10 pm)	Collingwood	17.21 (123)	**8.11 (59)**	Lost by 64 points	Melbourne Cricket Ground (A)	Ten	67,688	1–3	Report
5	Sunday, 25 April (5:40 pm)	North Melbourne	**10.10 (70)**	12.10 (82)	Lost by 12 points	Aurora Stadium (H)	Fox Sports	16,301	1–4	Report
6	Saturday, 1 May (7:10 pm)	Essendon	15.16 (106)	**9.9 (63)**	Lost by 43 points	Melbourne Cricket Ground (A)	Ten	61,006	1–5	Report
7	Saturday, 8 May (1:10 pm)	West Coast	15.12 (102)	**14.10 (94)**	Lost by 8 points	Subiaco Oval (A)	Ten	35,864	1–6	Report
8	Sunday, 16 May (1:10 pm)	Richmond	13.8 (86)	**13.11 (89)**	Won by 3 points	Melbourne Cricket Ground (A)	Fox Sports	41,563	2–6	Report
9	Sunday, 23 May (2:10 pm)	Carlton	8.12 (60)	**16.14 (110)**	Won by 50 points	Etihad Stadium (A)	Seven	47,484	3–6	Report
10	Sunday, 30 May (1:10 pm)	Sydney	**10.19 (79)**	11.11 (77)	Won by 2 points	Melbourne Cricket Ground (H)	Fox Sports	36,003	4–6	Report
11	Sunday, 6 June (2:10 pm)	Port Adelaide	**10.14 (74)**	8.15 (63)	Won by 11 points	Melbourne Cricket Ground (H)	Seven	21,287	5–6	Report
12	Saturday, 12 June (2:10 pm)	Adelaide	**19.10 (124)**	11.11 (77)	Won by 47 points	Aurora Stadium (H)	Fox Sports	16,167	6–6	Report
13	Friday, 18 June (7:40 pm)	Essendon	**14.18 (102)**	13.8 (86)	Won by 16 points	Melbourne Cricket Ground (H)	Seven	54,148	7–6	Report
14	Friday, 2 July (7:40 pm)	Western Bulldogs	**12.7 (79)**	11.10 (76)	Won by 3 points	Melbourne Cricket Ground (H)	Seven	47,454	8–6	Report
15	Saturday, 10 July (2:10 pm)	Geelong	12.13 (85)	**11.17 (83)**	Lost by 2 points	Melbourne Cricket Ground (A)	Ten	69,220	8–7	Report
16	Saturday, 17 July (2:10 pm)	Brisbane Lions	**17.16 (118)**	7.1 (43)	Won by 75 points	Aurora Stadium (H)	Fox Sports	16,690	9–7	Report
17	Friday, 23 July (7:40 pm)	St Kilda	14.3 (87)	**13.9 (87)**	Draw	Etihad Stadium (A)	Seven	49,373	9–7–1	Report
18	Saturday, 31 July (2:40 pm)	Port Adelaide	13.14 (92)	**12.12 (84)**	Lost by 8 points	AAMI Stadium (A)	Fox Sports	22,340	9–8–1	Report
19	Saturday, 7 August (2:10 pm)	Sydney	19.15 (129)	**13.7 (85)**	Lost by 44 points	Sydney Cricket Ground (A)	Ten	29,431	9–9–1	Report
20	Sunday, 15 August (2:10 pm)	Melbourne	**15.9 (99)**	12.6 (78)	Won by 21 points	Melbourne Cricket Ground (H)	Seven	48,211	10–9–1	Report
21	Saturday, 21 August (2:10 pm)	Fremantle	**24.11 (155)**	5.9 (39)	Won by 116 points	Aurora Stadium (H)	Fox Sports	15,532	11–9–1	Report
22	Saturday, 28 August (2:10 pm)	Collingwood	**15.8 (98)**	13.17 (95)	Won by 3 points	Melbourne Cricket Ground (H)	Ten	76,218	12–9–1	Report

=== Ladder ===
2010 AFL ladder
Pos	Team	Pld	W	L	D	PF	PA	PP	Pts	
1	Collingwood (P)	22	17	4	1	2349	1658	141.7	70	Finals series
2	Geelong	22	17	5	0	2518	1702	147.9	68	Finals series
3	St Kilda	22	15	6	1	1935	1591	121.6	62	Finals series
4	Western Bulldogs	22	14	8	0	2174	1734	125.4	56	Finals series
5	Sydney	22	13	9	0	2017	1863	108.3	52	Finals series
6	Fremantle	22	13	9	0	2168	2087	103.9	52	Finals series
**7**	Hawthorn	**22**	**12**	**9**	**1**	**2044**	**1847**	**110.7**	50	Finals series
8	Carlton	22	11	11	0	2143	1983	108.1	44	Finals series
9	North Melbourne	22	11	11	0	1930	2208	87.4	44	
10	Port Adelaide	22	10	12	0	1749	2123	82.4	40	
11	Adelaide	22	9	13	0	1763	1870	94.3	36	
12	Melbourne	22	8	13	1	1863	1971	94.5	34	
13	Brisbane Lions	22	7	15	0	1775	2158	82.3	28	
14	Essendon	22	7	15	0	1930	2402	80.3	28	
15	Richmond	22	6	16	0	1714	2348	73.0	24	
16	West Coast	22	4	18	0	1773	2300	77.1	16	

Source: AFL ladder
Rules for classification: 1) points; 2) percentage; 3) number of points for.
(P) Premiers

=== Finals series ===
Rd	Date and local time	Opponent	Scores (Hawthorn's scores indicated in bold)			Venue	TV	Attendance	Report
Rd	Date and local time	Opponent	Home	Away	Result	Venue	TV	Attendance	Report
Elimination final	Saturday, 4 September (1:20 pm)	Fremantle	14.10 (94)	**8.16 (64)**	Lost by 30 points	Subiaco Oval (A)	Ten	42,719	Report
