= 2011 Hawthorn Football Club season =

87th season in the Australian Football League

Hawthorn Football Club
2011 season
- President: Jeff Kennett
- Coach: Alastair Clarkson
- Captain: Luke Hodge
- Home grounds: Melbourne Cricket Ground; Aurora Stadium
- Pre-season competition: First round
- AFL Season: 18–4 (3rd)
- Finals Series: Preliminary Final (lost to Collingwood 65–68)
- Best and Fairest: Sam Mitchell
- Leading goalkicker: Lance Franklin (82)
- Highest home attendance: 78,579 (Round 5 vs. Geelong)
- Lowest home attendance: 14,604 (Round 16 vs. Brisbane Lions)
- Average home attendance: 37,933

The 2011 season was the Hawthorn Football Club's 87th season in the Australian Football League and 110th overall.

== Playing list changes ==
The following lists all player changes between the conclusion of the 2010 season and the beginning of the 2011 season.

=== Trades ===
11 October 2010	To Hawthorn David Hale; Pick 52, 2010 AFL draft	To North Melbourne End of 1st round compensation draft pick, 2010 AFL draft Pick 71, 2010 AFL draft
11 October 2010	To Hawthorn Kyle Cheney; Pick 66, 2010 AFL draft	To Melbourne Pick 52, 2010 AFL draft

=== Draft ===
==== AFL draft ====
Round	Overall pick	Player	Recruited from	ref
1	19	Isaac Smith	North Ballarat	
2	38	Mitch Hallahan	Dandenong Stingrays	
3	55	Angus Litherland	Claremont Football Club	
4	66	Paul Puopolo	Norwood	

==== Pre-season draft ====
Round	Overall pick	Player	Recruited from	ref
1	5	Cameron Bruce	Melbourne	

==== Rookie draft ====
Round	Overall pick	Player	Recruited from	ref
1	19	Sam Menegola	East Fremantle	
2	36	Thomas Schneider	Oakleigh Chargers	
3	52	Derick Wanganeen	Port Adelaide Magpies	
6	85	Will Langford	UNSW-Eastern Suburbs	
7	87	Jack Mahony	Wollongong Lions	

=== Retirements and delistings ===
Date	Player	2011 team	Reason	Ref
14 September 2010	Campbell Brown	Gold Coast	Out of contract	
19 October 2010	Beau Dowler	—N/a	Delisted	
19 October 2010	Rhan Hooper	—N/a	Delisted	
19 October 2010	Michael Johnston	—N/a	Delisted	
19 October 2010	Jarrod Kayler-Thomson	—N/a	Delisted	
19 October 2010	Garry Moss	—N/a	Delisted	
19 October 2010	Beau Muston	—N/a	Delisted	
19 October 2010	Carl Peterson	—N/a	Delisted	
19 October 2010	Wayde Skipper	—N/a	Delisted	
19 October 2010	Cameron Stokes	—N/a	Delisted	
19 October 2010	Simon Taylor	—N/a	Delisted	
19 October 2010	Travis Tuck	—N/a	Delisted	

== 2011 player squad ==
2011 Hawthorn Football Club squad
Senior list		Rookie list	Coaching staff
1 Max Bailey; 2 Jarryd Roughead (VC); 3 Jordan Lewis (VC); 4 Rick Ladson; 5 Sam Mitchell; 6 Josh Gibson; 7 Michael Osborne; 8 Xavier Ellis; 9 Shaun Burgoyne; 10 Chance Bateman; 11 Clinton Young; 12 Brad Sewell; 13 Kyle Cheney; 14 Grant Birchall; 15 Luke Hodge (C); 16 Isaac Smith; 17 Cameron Bruce; 18 Brent Guerra; 19 Jarryd Morton; 20 David Hale	21 Shane Savage; 22 Travis Tuck (ret); 23 Lance Franklin; 24 Ben Stratton; 25 Ryan Schoenmakers; 26 Liam Shiels; 27 Stephen Gilham; 28 Paul Puopolo; 29 Thomas Murphy; 30 Luke Lowden; 31 Matt Suckling; 32 Riley Milne; 33 Cyril Rioli; 34 Brent Renouf; 35 Sam Grimley; 36 Jordan Lisle; 37 Brendan Whitecross; 38 Mitch Hallahan; 40 Jordan Williams; 41 Taylor Duryea; 42 Angus Litherland	43 Will Sierakowski; 44 Sam Menegola; 45 Thomas Schneider; 46 Derick Wanganeen; 47 Luke Breust; 50 Paul Johnson (b); NSW Scholarship: 48 Will Langford; 49 Jack Mahony; International Scholarship: 51 Kurt Heatherley (New Zealand); 52 Rhys Panui-Leth (New Zealand)	Head coach: Alastair Clarkson; Assistant coaches: Leon Cameron (Forward); Brendon Bolton (Midfield); Adam Simpson (Midfield); Ross Smith (Defense); Damian Monkhorst (Ruck); Legend: (c) Captain(s); (vc) Vice-captain(s); Updated: 26 September 2011; Source(s): HFC Website; Coaches

== Fixture ==
=== NAB Cup ===
Rd	Date and local time	Opponent	Scores (Hawthorn's scores indicated in bold)			Venue	Attendance
Rd	Date and local time	Opponent	Home	Away	Result	Venue	Attendance
1	Sunday, 13 February (4:45 pm)	West Coast	0.5.1 (31)	**0.4.5 (29)**	Lost by 2 points	Patersons Stadium	25,776
1	Sunday, 13 February (5:50 pm)	Fremantle	**1.4.4 (37)**	0.3.5 (23)	Won by 14 points	Patersons Stadium	–

=== Premiership season ===
Rd	Date and local time	Opponent	Scores (Hawthorn's scores indicated in bold)			Venue	TV	Attendance	Record	Report
Rd	Date and local time	Opponent	Home	Away	Result	Venue	TV	Attendance	Record	Report
1	Saturday, 26 March (6:40 pm)	Adelaide	16.9 (105)	**12.13 (85)**	Lost by 30 points	AAMI Stadium (A)	Ten	43,536	0–1	Report
2	Sunday, 3 April (4:40 pm)	Melbourne	**16.26 (122)**	12.5 (77)	Won by 55 points	Melbourne Cricket Ground (H)	Fox Sports	49,905	1–1	Report
3	Saturday, 9 April (7:10 pm)	Richmond	6.16 (42)	**17.13 (115)**	Won by 73 points	Melbourne Cricket Ground (A)	Ten	46,368	2–1	Report
4	Saturday, 16 April (2:10 pm)	West Coast	**10.12 (72)**	9.11 (65)	Won by 7 points	Aurora Stadium (H)	Fox Sports	15,063	3–1	Report
5	Tuesday, 26 April (2:40 pm)	Geelong	**15.8 (98)**	17.15 (117)	Lost by 19 points	Melbourne Cricket Ground (H)	Seven	78,579	3–2	Report
6	Bye									
7	Friday, 6 May (8:10 pm)	Port Adelaide	10.12 (72)	**15.14 (104)**	Won by 32 points	AAMI Stadium (A)	Seven	21,819	4–2	Report
8	Sunday, 15 May (1:10 pm)	St Kilda	**14.15 (99)**	10.9 (69)	Won by 30 points	Melbourne Cricket Ground (H)	Fox Sports	42,453	5–2	Report
9	Sunday, 22 May (2:10 pm)	Sydney	8.12 (60)	**15.16 (106)**	Won by 46 points	Sydney Cricket Ground (A)	Seven	33,136	6–2	Report
10	Sunday, 29 May (4:40 pm)	Western Bulldogs	9.8 (62)	**13.13 (91)**	Won by 29 points	Etihad Stadium (A)	Fox Sports	30,747	7–2	Report
11	Sunday, 5 June (1:10 pm)	Fremantle	**17.9 (111)**	13.11 (89)	Won by 22 points	Melbourne Cricket Ground (H)	Fox Sports	31,925	8–2	Report
12	Saturday, 11 June (7:10 pm)	Geelong	13.10 (88)	**13.5 (83)**	Lost by 5 points	Melbourne Cricket Ground (A)	Ten	63,476	8–3	Report
13	Saturday, 18 June (2:10 pm)	Gold Coast	**19.15 (129)**	8.10 (58)	Won by 71 points	Aurora Stadium (H)	Ten	16,377	9–3	Report
14	Friday, 24 June (7:40 pm)	Essendon	**23.8 (146)**	12.9 (81)	Won by 65 points	Melbourne Cricket Ground (H)	Seven	64,537	10–3	Report
15	Sunday, 3 July (2:10 pm)	Collingwood	15.16 (106)	**9.11 (65)**	Lost by 41 points	Melbourne Cricket Ground (A)	Seven	83,985	10–4	Report
16	Saturday, 9 July (2:10 pm)	Brisbane Lions	**16.9 (105)**	9.9 (63)	Won by 42 points	Aurora Stadium (H)	Fox Sports	14,604	11–4	Report
17	Bye									
18	Sunday, 24 July (2:10 pm)	Melbourne	12.6 (78)	**20.12 (132)**	Won by 54 points	Melbourne Cricket Ground (A)	Seven	39,782	12–4	Report
19	Saturday, 30 July (5:40 pm)	Fremantle	6.8 (44)	**13.17 (95)**	Won by 51 points	Patersons Stadium (A)	Ten	30,937	13–4	Report
20	Sunday, 7 August (2:10 pm)	North Melbourne	**15.13 (103)**	13.8 (86)	Won by 17 points	Aurora Stadium (H)	Seven	16,820	14–4	Report
21	Saturday, 13 August (2:10 pm)	Port Adelaide	**31.11 (197)**	5.2 (32)	Won by 165 points	Melbourne Cricket Ground (H)	Ten	27,532	15–4	Report
22	Friday, 19 August (7:40 pm)	Carlton	8.18 (66)	**10.18 (78)**	Won by 12 points	Etihad Stadium (A)	Seven	52,052	16–4	Report
23	Saturday, 27 August (2:10 pm)	Western Bulldogs	**16.17 (113)**	10.7 (67)	Won by 46 points	Melbourne Cricket Ground (H)	Ten	42,198	17–4	Report
24	Saturday, 3 September (1:10 pm)	Gold Coast	14.13 (97)	**16.10 (106)**	Won by 9 points	Metricon Stadium (A)	Fox Sports	19,314	18–4	Report

=== Ladder ===
2011 AFL ladder
Pos	Team	Pld	W	L	D	PF	PA	PP	Pts	
1	Collingwood	22	20	2	0	2592	1546	167.7	80	Finals series
2	Geelong (P)	22	19	3	0	2548	1619	157.4	76	Finals series
**3**	Hawthorn	**22**	**18**	**4**	**0**	**2355**	**1634**	**144.1**	72	Finals series
4	West Coast	22	17	5	0	2235	1715	130.3	68	Finals series
5	Carlton	22	14	7	1	2225	1700	130.9	58	Finals series
6	St Kilda	22	12	9	1	1891	1677	112.8	50	Finals series
7	Sydney	22	12	9	1	1897	1735	109.3	50	Finals series
8	Essendon	22	11	10	1	2217	2217	100.0	46	Finals series
9	North Melbourne	22	10	12	0	2106	2082	101.2	40	
10	Western Bulldogs	22	9	13	0	2060	2155	95.6	36	
11	Fremantle	22	9	13	0	1791	2155	83.1	36	
12	Richmond	22	8	13	1	2069	2396	86.4	34	
13	Melbourne	22	8	13	1	1974	2315	85.3	34	
14	Adelaide	22	7	15	0	1742	2193	79.4	28	
15	Brisbane Lions	22	4	18	0	1814	2240	81.0	16	
16	Port Adelaide	22	3	19	0	1718	2663	64.5	12	
17	Gold Coast	22	3	19	0	1534	2726	56.3	12	

Source: AFL ladder
Rules for classification: 1) points; 2) percentage; 3) number of points for.
(P) Premiers

=== Finals series ===
Rd	Date and local time	Opponent	Scores (Hawthorn's scores indicated in bold)			Venue	TV	Attendance	Report
Rd	Date and local time	Opponent	Home	Away	Result	Venue	TV	Attendance	Report
Qualifying Final	Friday, 9 September (7:45 pm)	Geelong	14.14 (98)	**9.13 (67)**	Lost by 31 points	Melbourne Cricket Ground (A)	Seven	73,601	Report
Semi Final	Friday, 16 September (7:45 pm)	Sydney	**19.8 (122)**	13.8 (86)	Won by 36 points	Melbourne Cricket Ground (H)	Seven	55,198	Report
Preliminary Final	Friday, 23 September (7:45 pm)	Collingwood	10.8 (68)	**9.11 (65)**	Lost by 3 points	Melbourne Cricket Ground (A)	Seven	87,112	Report
