= 2008 Hawthorn Football Club season =

84th season in the Australian Football League

Hawthorn Football Club
2008 season
- President: Jeff Kennett
- Coach: Alastair Clarkson
- Captain: Sam Mitchell
- Home ground: Melbourne Cricket Ground; Aurora Stadium
- Pre-season competition: Semi final
- AFL season: 17–5 (2nd)
- Finals series: Premiers (Defeated Geelong 115–89)
- Best and Fairest: Lance Franklin
- Leading goalkicker: Lance Franklin (113)
- Highest home attendance: 86,179 (Round 16 vs. Geelong)
- Lowest home attendance: 15,124 (Round 4 vs. Adelaide)
- Average home attendance: 45,649

The 2008 season was the Hawthorn Football Club's 84th season in the Australian Football League and 107th overall.

One of the most prominent Hawthorn players in 2008 was teenager Lance Franklin.

== Playing list changes ==
=== Draft ===
==== AFL draft ====
Round	Overall pick	Player	Recruited from	ref
1	12	Cyril Rioli	St Mary's	
2	29	Brendan Whitecross	Zillmere	
3	45	Stuart Dew	Port Adelaide	

==== Rookie draft ====
Round	Overall pick	Player	Recruited from	ref
1	11	Hugh Sandilands	Oakleigh Chargers	
2	27	Tim Walsh	Port Adelaide Magpies	
3	42	Alex Grima	Tassie Mariners	
4	54	Cameron Stokes	Darwin	

=== Retirements and delistings ===
Date	Player	2008 team	Reason	Ref
6 September 2007	Richie Vandenberg	—N/a	Retired	
19 September 2007	Ben Dixon	—N/a	Retired	
25 September 2007	Joel Smith	—N/a	Retired	
16 October 2007	Matt Little	—N/a	Delisted	
16 October 2007	Josh Thurgood	—N/a	Delisted	

== 2008 player squad ==
2008 Hawthorn Football Club squad
Senior list		Rookie list	Coaching staff
1 Max Bailey; 2 Jarryd Roughead; 3 Jordan Lewis; 4 Rick Ladson; 5 Sam Mitchell (C); 6 Mark Williams; 7 Michael Osborne; 8 Xavier Ellis; 9 Shane Crawford; 10 Chance Bateman; 11 Clinton Young; 12 Brad Sewell; 13 Simon Taylor; 14 Grant Birchall; 15 Luke Hodge (VC); 16 Beau Dowler; 17 Beau Muston; 18 Brent Guerra; 19 Mitch Thorp; 20 Tim Boyle	21 Ben McGlynn; 22 Travis Tuck; 23 Lance Franklin; 24 Trent Croad; 25 Tim Clarke; 26 Zac Dawson; 27 Stephen Gilham; 28 Garry Moss; 29 Tom Murphy; 30 Campbell Brown; 31 Stuart Dew; 33 Cyril Rioli; 34 Brent Renouf; 35 Jarryd Morton; 36 Josh Kennedy; 37 Brendan Whitecross; 38 Luke McEntee; 39 Robert Campbell; Danny Jacobs (ret)	40 Hugh Sandilands; 41 Tim Walsh; 42 Matt Suckling; 43 Alex Grima; 44 Cameron Stokes	Head coach: Alastair Clarkson; Legend: (c) Captain(s); (vc) Vice-captain(s); Updated: 27 September 2008; Source(s): Draftguru

== Fixture ==
=== NAB Cup ===
Rd	Date and local time	Opponent	Scores (Hawthorn's scores indicated in bold)			Venue	Attendance
Rd	Date and local time	Opponent	Home	Away	Result	Venue	Attendance
1	Sunday, 17 February (3:40 pm)	Sydney	**3.2.13 (52)**	0.7.8 (50)	Won by 2 points	Aurora Stadium (H)	14,778
Quarter final	Saturday, 23 February (7:10 pm)	Carlton	**4.9.13 (103)**	4.3.15 (69)	Won by 34 points	Telstra Dome (H)	20,940
Semi-final	Saturday, 1 March (6:40 pm)	Adelaide	2.13.11 (107)	**1.11.9 (84)**	Lost by 23 points	AAMI Stadium (A)	14,033

=== Premiership season ===
Rd	Date and local time	Opponent	Scores (Hawthorn's scores indicated in bold)			Venue	Attendance	Record	Report
Rd	Date and local time	Opponent	Home	Away	Result	Venue	Attendance	Record	Report
1	Sunday, 23 March (4:40 pm)	Melbourne	**23.16 (154)**	6.14 (50)	Won by 104 points	Melbourne Cricket Ground (H)	40,141	1–0	Report
2	Saturday, 29 March (5:40 pm)	Fremantle	14.13 (97)	**16.16 (112)**	Won by 15 points	Subiaco Oval (A)	38,022	2–0	Report
3	Saturday, 5 April (2:10 pm)	North Melbourne	13.8 (86)	**15.12 (102)**	Won by 16 points	Telstra Dome (A)	39,816	3–0	Report
4	Sunday, 13 April (1:10 pm)	Adelaide	**17.12 (114)**	10.10 (70)	Won by 44 points	Aurora Stadium (H)	15,124	4–0	Report
5	Saturday, 19 April (7:10 pm)	Brisbane Lions	17.16 (118)	**19.16 (130)**	Won by 12 points	The Gabba (A)	30,019	5–0	Report
6	Sunday, 27 April (4:40 pm)	Richmond	**14.22 (106)**	15.4 (94)	Won by 12 points	Melbourne Cricket Ground (H)	46,076	6–0	Report
7	Saturday, 3 May (2:10 pm)	Collingwood	**24.10 (154)**	13.11 (89)	Won by 65 points	Melbourne Cricket Ground (H)	76,048	7–0	Report
8	Saturday, 17 May (2:10 pm)	Port Adelaide	**17.15 (117)**	15.12 (102)	Won by 15 points	Aurora Stadium (H)	15,682	8–0	Report
9	Sunday, 25 May (2:10 pm)	Melbourne	12.6 (78)	**14.13 (97)**	Won by 19 points	Melbourne Cricket Ground (A)	41,341	9–0	Report
10	Saturday, 31 May (2:10 pm)	Western Bulldogs	**12.2 (74)**	15.16 (106)	Lost by 32 points	Aurora Stadium (H)	19,378	9–1	Report
11	Saturday, 7 June (7:10 pm)	Essendon	12.7 (79)	**19.16 (130)**	Won by 51 points	Telstra Dome (A)	46,377	10–1	Report
12	Saturday, 14 June (7:10 pm)	Adelaide	10.12 (72)	**11.10 (76)**	Won by 4 points	AAMI Stadium (A)	44,559	11–1	Report
13	Saturday, 21 June (2:10 pm)	North Melbourne	**10.16 (76)**	15.13 (103)	Lost by 27 points	Melbourne Cricket Ground (A)	42,508	11–2	Report
14	Friday, 27 June (7:40 pm)	West Coast	**18.18 (126)**	9.15 (69)	Won by 57 points	Melbourne Cricket Ground (H)	29,138	12–2	Report
15	Sunday, 13 July (1:10 pm)	Sydney	**15.16 (106)**	10.15 (75)	Won by 31 points	Melbourne Cricket Ground (H)	49,529	13–2	Report
16	Saturday, 19 July (7:10 pm)	St Kilda	18.11 (119)	**13.11 (89)**	Lost by 30 points	Telstra Dome (A)	41,886	13–3	Report
17	Friday, 25 July (7:40 pm)	Geelong	**11.11 (77)**	12.16 (88)	Lost by 11 points	Melbourne Cricket Ground (H)	86,179	13–4	Report
18	Friday, 1 August (7:40 pm)	Collingwood	8.14 (62)	**17.14 (116)**	Won by 54 points	Melbourne Cricket Ground (A)	58,307	14–4	Report
19	Saturday, 9 August (2:10 pm)	Brisbane Lions	**16.14 (110)**	5.11 (41)	Won by 69 points	Aurora Stadium (H)	19,929	15–4	Report
20	Sunday, 17 August (1:10 pm)	Richmond	16.9 (105)	**10.16 (76)**	Lost by 29 points	Melbourne Cricket Ground (A)	44,523	15–5	Report
21	Sunday, 24 August (2:40 pm)	West Coast	9.8 (62)	**19.19 (133)**	Won by 71 points	Subiaco Oval (A)	37,040	16–5	Report
22	Saturday, 30 August (7:10 pm)	Carlton	12.9 (81)	**24.15 (159)**	Won by 78 points	Telstra Dome (A)	49,057	17–5	Report

==== Ladder ====
2008 AFL ladder
Pos	Team	Pld	W	L	D	PF	PA	PP	Pts	
1	Geelong	22	21	1	0	2672	1651	161.8	84	Finals series
**2**	Hawthorn (P)	**22**	**17**	**5**	**0**	**2434**	**1846**	**131.9**	68	Finals series
3	Western Bulldogs	22	15	6	1	2506	2112	118.7	62	Finals series
4	St Kilda	22	13	9	0	2126	1923	110.6	52	Finals series
5	Adelaide	22	13	9	0	2017	1838	109.7	52	Finals series
6	Sydney	22	12	9	1	2095	1863	112.5	50	Finals series
7	North Melbourne	22	12	9	1	2121	2187	97.0	50	Finals series
8	Collingwood	22	12	10	0	2267	2038	111.2	48	Finals series
9	Richmond	22	11	10	1	2228	2288	97.4	46	
10	Brisbane	22	10	12	0	2156	2200	98.0	40	
11	Carlton	22	10	12	0	2217	2354	94.2	40	
12	Essendon	22	8	14	0	2130	2608	81.7	32	
13	Port Adelaide	22	7	15	0	2118	2208	95.9	28	
14	Fremantle	22	6	16	0	1988	2121	93.7	24	
15	West Coast	22	4	18	0	1670	2535	65.9	16	
16	Melbourne	22	3	19	0	1629	2602	62.6	12	

Source: AFL ladder
Rules for classification: 1) points; 2) percentage; 3) number of points for.
(P) Premiers

=== Finals series ===
Rd	Date and local time	Opponent	Scores (Hawthorn's scores indicated in bold)			Venue	Attendance	Report
Rd	Date and local time	Opponent	Home	Away	Result	Venue	Attendance	Report
Qualifying final	Friday, 5 September (7:50 pm)	Western Bulldogs	**18.19 (127)**	11.10 (76)	Won by 51 points	Melbourne Cricket Ground (H)	76,703	Report
Semi-final	Advanced to Preliminary final							
Preliminary final	Saturday, 20 September (7:00 pm)	St Kilda	**18.10 (118)**	9.10 (64)	Won by 54 points	Melbourne Cricket Ground (H)	77,002	Report
Grand Final	Saturday, 27 September (2:30 pm)	Geelong	11.23 (89)	**18.7 (115)**	Won by 26 points	Melbourne Cricket Ground (A)	100,012	Report

== See also ==
- 2008 AFL season
- Hawthorn Football Club
