= 2007 Hawthorn Football Club season =

83rd season in the Australian Football League

Hawthorn Football Club
2007 season
- President: Jeff Kennett
- Coach: Alastair Clarkson
- Captain: Richie Vandenberg
- Home ground: Melbourne Cricket Ground; Aurora Stadium
- Pre-season competition: Quarter final
- AFL season: 13–9 (5th)
- Finals series: Semi-final (lost to Kangaroos 60–93)
- Best and Fairest: Brad Sewell
- Leading goalkicker: Lance Franklin (73)
- Highest home attendance: 55,019 (Round 18 vs. Essendon)
- Lowest home attendance: 15,264 (Round 20 vs. Port Adelaide)
- Average home attendance: 33,466

The 2007 season was the Hawthorn Football Club's 83rd season in the Australian Football League and 106th overall.

== 2006 Draft ==
Pick	Player	Original Club
6	Mitch Thorp	Tassie Mariners
24	Brent Renouf	Southport
33	Jarryd Morton	Claremont
40	Josh Kennedy	Sandringham Dragons
56	Garry Moss	East Perth

== Fixture ==
=== NAB Cup ===
Rd	Date and local time	Opponent	Scores (Hawthorn's scores indicated in bold)			Venue	Attendance
Rd	Date and local time	Opponent	Home	Away	Result	Venue	Attendance
1	Sunday, 25 February (6:10 pm)	Melbourne	2.9.14 (86)	**3.11.17 (110)**	Won by 24 points	Telstra Dome (A)	14,000
Quarter Final	Saturday, 3 March (6:10 pm)	Carlton	**2.7.8 (68)**	1.9.12 (75)	Lost by 7 points	Aurora Stadium (H)	15,412

=== Premiership Season ===
Rd	Date and local time	Opponent	Scores (Hawthorn's scores indicated in bold)			Venue	Attendance	Record
Rd	Date and local time	Opponent	Home	Away	Result	Venue	Attendance	Record
1	Saturday, 31 March (7:15 pm)	Brisbane Lions	9.15 (69)	**6.8 (44)**	Lost by 25 points	The Gabba (A)	27,104	0–1
2	Monday, 9 April (2:10 pm)	Melbourne	**17.14 (116)**	14.10 (94)	Won by 22 points	Melbourne Cricket Ground (H)	43,197	1–1
3	Sunday, 15 April (5:10 pm)	Kangaroos	10.10 (70)	**13.13 (91)**	Won by 21 points	Telstra Dome (A)	28,481	2–1
4	Sunday, 22 April (1:10 pm)	Geelong	**10.16 (76)**	9.18 (72)	Won by 4 points	Aurora Stadium (H)	17,120	3–1
5	Sunday, 29 April (2:10 pm)	Western Bulldogs	**13.15 (93)**	16.14 (110)	Lost by 17 points	Melbourne Cricket Ground (H)	31,982	3–2
6	Saturday, 5 May (2:10 pm)	Essendon	15.6 (96)	**20.11 (131)**	Won by 35 points	Melbourne Cricket Ground (A)	52,047	4–2
7	Sunday, 13 May (2:40 pm)	Fremantle	14.12 (96)	**11.14 (80)**	Lost by 16 points	Subiaco Oval (A)	36,481	4–3
8	Saturday, 19 May (7:10 pm)	St Kilda	**10.12 (72)**	6.8 (44)	Won by 28 points	Melbourne Cricket Ground (H)	36,069	5–3
9	Saturday, 26 May (2:10 pm)	West Coast	**15.9 (99)**	8.16 (64)	Won by 25 points	Aurora Stadium (H)	18,112	6–3
10	Sunday, 3 June (1:10 pm)	Port Adelaide	10.15 (75)	**17.7 (109)**	Won by 34 points	AAMI Stadium (A)	23,945	7–3
11	Saturday, 9 June (2:10 pm)	Sydney	**9.12 (66)**	11.9 (75)	Lost by 9 points	Melbourne Cricket Ground (H)	48,398	7–4
12	Friday, 15 June (7:40 pm)	Carlton	12.8 (80)	**27.18 (180)**	Won by 100 points	Telstra Dome (A)	53,459	8–4
13	Sunday, 1 July (5:10 pm)	Collingwood	12.15 (87)	**15.5 (95)**	Won by 8 points	Telstra Dome (A)	50,248	9–4
14	Saturday, 7 July (7:10 pm)	Adelaide	15.12 (102)	**4.7 (31)**	Lost by 71 points	AAMI Stadium (A)	34,733	9–5
15	Sunday, 15 July (2:10 pm)	Richmond	**19.15 (129)**	11.10 (76)	Won by 53 points	Melbourne Cricket Ground (H)	41,770	10–5
16	Saturday, 21 July (7:10 pm)	St Kilda	14.11 (95)	**11.12 (78)**	Lost by 17 points	Telstra Dome (A)	37,847	10–6
17	Sunday, 29 July (1:10 pm)	Kangaroos	**10.11 (71)**	16.12 (108)	Lost by 37 points	Aurora Stadium (H)	19,114	10–7
18	Sunday, 5 August (2:10 pm)	Essendon	**17.17 (119)**	7.14 (56)	Won by 63 points	Melbourne Cricket Ground (H)	55,019	11–7
19	Saturday, 11 August (2:10 pm)	Brisbane Lions	**17.13 (115)**	13.13 (91)	Won by 24 points	Melbourne Cricket Ground (H)	39,007	12–7
20	Sunday, 19 August (1:10 pm)	Port Adelaide	**12.10 (82)**	12.15 (87)	Lost by 5 points	Aurora Stadium (H)	15,264	12–8
21	Sunday, 26 August (1:10 pm)	Western Bulldogs	10.7 (67)	**22.19 (151)**	Won by 84 points	Telstra Dome (A)	32,734	13–9
22	Sunday, 2 September (1:10 pm)	Sydney	22.9 (141)	**10.9 (69)**	Lost by 72 points	Sydney Cricket Ground (A)	27,498	13–10

=== Finals Series ===
Rd	Date and local time	Opponent	Scores (Hawthorn's scores indicated in bold)			Venue	Attendance
Rd	Date and local time	Opponent	Home	Away	Result	Venue	Attendance
Elimination final	Saturday, 8 September (2:30 pm)	Adelaide	**15.15 (105)**	15.12 (102)	Won by 3 points	Telstra Dome (H)	36,534
Semi-final	Saturday, 15 September (7:30 pm)	Kangaroos	14.9 (93)	**8.12 (60)**	Lost by 33 points	Melbourne Cricket Ground (A)	74,981

== Ladder ==
2007 AFL ladder
Pos	Team	Pld	W	L	D	PF	PA	PP	Pts	
1	Geelong (P)	22	18	4	0	2542	1664	152.8	72	Finals series
2	Port Adelaide	22	15	7	0	2314	2038	113.5	60	Finals series
3	West Coast	22	15	7	0	2162	1935	111.7	60	Finals series
4	Kangaroos	22	14	8	0	2183	1998	109.3	56	Finals series
5	Hawthorn	22	13	9	0	2097	1855	113.0	52	Finals series
6	Collingwood	22	13	9	0	2011	1992	101.0	52	Finals series
7	Sydney	22	12	9	1	2031	1698	119.6	50	Finals series
8	Adelaide	22	12	10	0	1881	1712	109.9	48	Finals series
9	St Kilda	22	11	10	1	1874	1941	96.5	46	
10	Brisbane Lions	22	9	11	2	1986	1885	105.4	40	
11	Fremantle	22	10	12	0	2254	2198	102.5	40	
12	Essendon	22	10	12	0	2184	2394	91.2	40	
13	Western Bulldogs	22	9	12	1	2111	2469	85.5	38	
14	Melbourne	22	5	17	0	1890	2418	78.2	20	
15	Carlton	22	4	18	0	2167	2911	74.4	16	
16	Richmond	22	3	18	1	1958	2537	77.2	14	

Source: AFL ladder
Rules for classification: 1) points; 2) percentage; 3) number of points for.
(P) Premiers
