= 2005 Hawthorn Football Club season =

81st season in the Australian Football League

Hawthorn Football Club
2005 season
- President: Ian Dicker
- Coach: Alastair Clarkson
- Captain: Richie Vandenberg
- Home ground: Melbourne Cricket Ground; Aurora Stadium
- AFL season: 5–17 (14th)
- Finals series: Did not qualify
- Best and Fairest: Luke Hodge
- Leading goalkicker: Mark Williams (63)
- Highest home attendance: 49,927 (Round 10 vs. Collingwood)
- Lowest home attendance: 16,287 (Round 15 vs. Adelaide)
- Average home attendance: 30,541

The 2005 season was the Hawthorn Football Club's 81st season in the Australian Football League and 104th overall.

== Fixture ==
=== Premiership season ===
Rd	Date and local time	Opponent	Scores (Hawthorn's scores indicated in bold)			Venue	Attendance	Record
Rd	Date and local time	Opponent	Home	Away	Result	Venue	Attendance	Record
1	Sunday, 27 March (1:15 pm)	Sydney	18.10 (118)	**8.7 (55)**	Lost by 63 points	Sydney Cricket Ground (A)	27,274	0–1
2	Sunday, 3 April (2:10 pm)	Richmond	**12.17 (89)**	16.7 (103)	Lost by 14 points	Melbourne Cricket Ground (H)	33,409	0–2
3	Sunday, 10 April (2:10 pm)	Essendon	10.17 (77)	**11.9 (75)**	Lost by 2 points	Melbourne Cricket Ground (A)	44,971	0–3
4	Saturday, 16 April (2:10 pm)	Brisbane Lions	**18.7 (115)**	10.9 (69)	Won by 46 points	Melbourne Cricket Ground (H)	27,778	1–3
5	Saturday, 23 April (2:10 pm)	Kangaroos	16.12 (108)	**13.11 (89)**	Lost by 19 points	Melbourne Cricket Ground (A)	38,764	1–4
6	Friday, 29 April (7:40 pm)	Carlton	13.11 (89)	**12.11 (83)**	Lost by 6 points	Telstra Dome (A)	49,018	1–5
7	Sunday, 8 May (1:10 pm)	West Coast	**12.5 (77)**	14.12 (96)	Lost by 19 points	Aurora Stadium (H)	16,933	1–6
8	Saturday, 14 May (2:10 pm)	Melbourne	**19.14 (128)**	13.11 (89)	Won by 39 points	Melbourne Cricket Ground (H)	38,587	2–6
9	Sunday, 22 May (2:40 pm)	Fremantle	10.10 (70)	**18.16 (124)**	Won by 54 points	Subiaco Oval (A)	35,393	3–6
10	Saturday, 28 May (2:10 pm)	Collingwood	**12.8 (80)**	17.6 (108)	Lost by 28 points	Melbourne Cricket Ground (H)	49,927	3–7
11	Sunday, 5 June (2:10 pm)	Western Bulldogs	17.9 (111)	**13.11 (89)**	Lost by 22 points	Telstra Dome (A)	29,240	3–8
12	Saturday, 11 June (2:10 pm)	St Kilda	**8.6 (54)**	15.10 (100)	Lost by 46 points	Melbourne Cricket Ground (H)	33,905	3–9
13	Friday, 17 June (8:10 pm)	Port Adelaide	29.14 (188)	**10.11 (71)**	Lost by 117 points	AAMI Stadium (A)	30,212	3–10
14	Sunday, 3 July (2:10 pm)	Geelong	16.17 (113)	**8.10 (58)**	Lost by 55 points	Telstra Dome (A)	36,667	3–11
15	Sunday, 10 July (1:10 pm)	Adelaide	**10.8 (68)**	12.6 (78)	Lost by 10 points	Aurora Stadium (H)	16,287	3–12
16	Sunday, 17 July (2:10 pm)	Kangaroos	**10.8 (68)**	16.13 (109)	Lost by 41 points	Telstra Dome (H)	23,722	3–13
17	Saturday, 23 July (2:10 pm)	Carlton	**19.13 (127)**	15.13 (103)	Won by 24 points	Melbourne Cricket Ground (H)	31,459	4–13
18	Saturday, 30 July (2:10 pm)	West Coast	12.25 (97)	**7.7 (49)**	Lost by 48 points	Subiaco Oval (A)	39,412	4–14
19	Sunday, 7 August (1:10 pm)	Brisbane Lions	18.13 (121)	**11.14 (80)**	Lost by 41 points	The Gabba (A)	31,946	4–15
20	Sunday, 14 August (2:10 pm)	Essendon	**17.15 (117)**	16.8 (104)	Won by 13 points	Melbourne Cricket Ground (H)	32,053	5–15
21	Sunday, 21 August (2:10 pm)	Richmond	20.17 (137)	**21.7 (133)**	Lost by 4 points	Telstra Dome (A)	30,906	5–16
22	Saturday, 27 August (2:10 pm)	Sydney	**11.9 (75)**	20.9 (129)	Lost by 54 points	Melbourne Cricket Ground (H)	31,891	5–17

== Ladder ==
2005 AFL ladder
Pos	Team	Pld	W	L	D	PF	PA	PP	Pts	
1	Adelaide	22	17	5	0	2070	1517	136.5	68	Finals series
2	West Coast	22	17	5	0	2261	1824	124.0	68	Finals series
3	Sydney (P)	22	15	7	0	1974	1696	116.4	60	Finals series
4	St Kilda	22	14	8	0	2407	1806	133.3	56	Finals series
5	Kangaroos	22	13	9	0	2053	2069	99.2	52	Finals series
6	Geelong	22	12	10	0	2134	1906	112.0	48	Finals series
7	Melbourne	22	12	10	0	2171	2266	95.8	48	Finals series
8	Port Adelaide	22	11	10	1	2028	2066	98.2	46	Finals series
9	Western Bulldogs	22	11	11	0	2385	2351	101.4	44	
10	Fremantle	22	11	11	0	2041	2038	100.1	44	
11	Brisbane Lions	22	10	12	0	2139	2164	98.8	40	
12	Richmond	22	10	12	0	2022	2190	92.3	40	
13	Essendon	22	8	14	0	2118	2302	92.0	32	
14	Hawthorn	22	5	17	0	1904	2317	82.2	20	
15	Collingwood	22	5	17	0	1884	2425	77.7	20	
16	Carlton	22	4	17	1	2016	2670	75.5	18	

Source: AFL ladder
Rules for classification: 1) points; 2) percentage; 3) number of points for.
(P) Premiers
