= Alastair Clarkson =

Australian rules footballer and coach (born 1968)

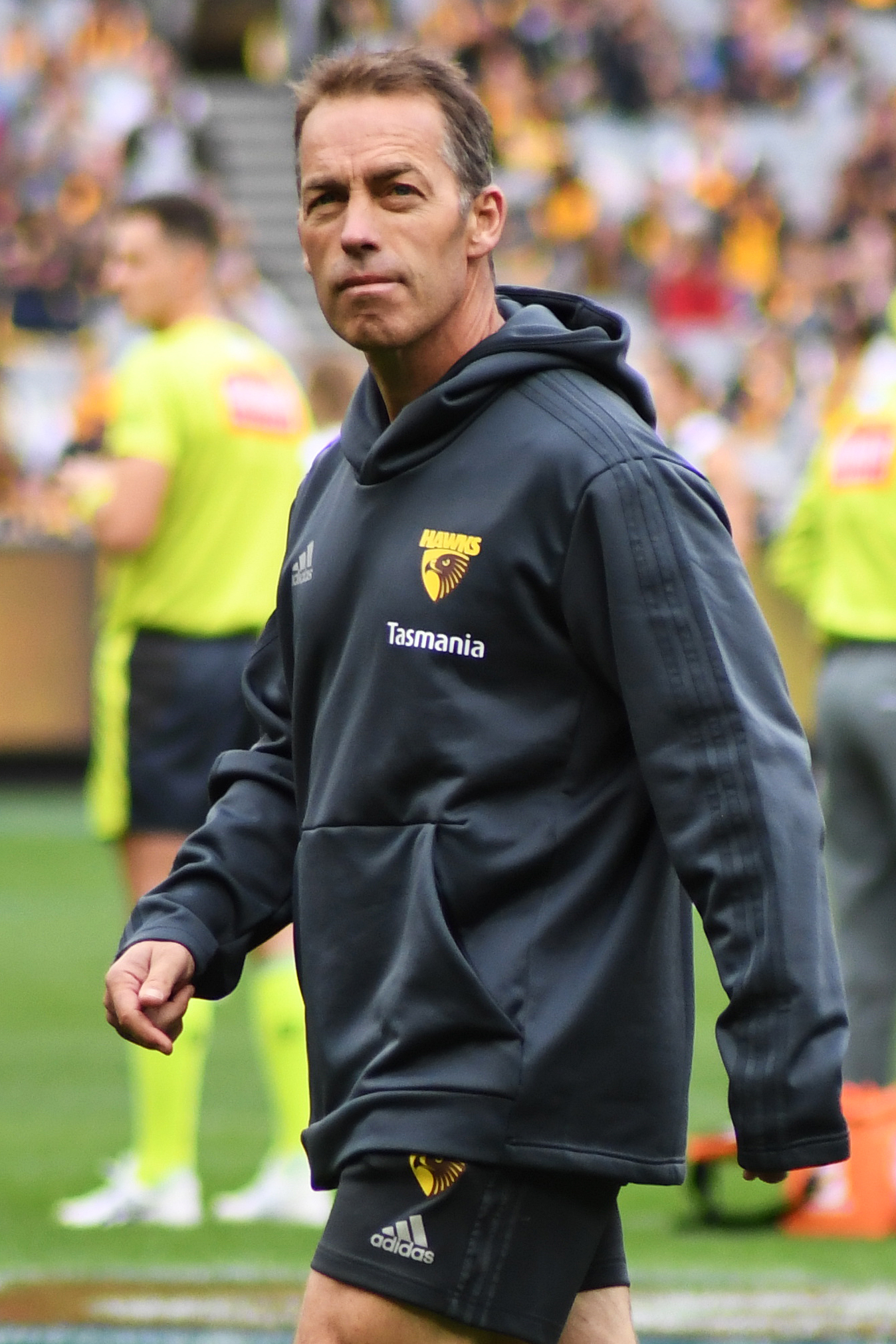
- Clarkson coaching in April 2019

Personal information
- Full name: Alastair Thomas Clarkson
- Nickname: Clarko
- Born: 27 April 1968 (age 58); Kaniva, Victoria, Australia
- Original team: Kaniva (TFL)
- Height: 177 cm (5 ft 10 in)
- Weight: 79 kg (174 lb)
- Position: Forward / Midfielder

Playing career^{1}
Years	Club	Games (Goals)
1987–1995	North Melbourne	93 (61)
1996–1997	Melbourne	41 (24)
Total		134 (85)

Coaching career^{3}
Years	Club	Games (W–L–D)
2000	Werribee (VFL)	19 (10–8–1)
2001–2002	Central District (SANFL)	40 (34–6–0)
2005–2021	Hawthorn	390 (228–158–4)
2023–2026	North Melbourne	82 (20–61–1)
Total		472 (248–219–5)
- ^{1} Playing statistics correct to the end of 1997.^{3} Coaching statistics correct as of 2026.

Career highlights
- 4× AFL premiership coach: 2008, 2013–2015; 4× All-Australian team coach: 2008, 2013–2015; SANFL premiership coach: 2001

Alastair Thomas Clarkson (born 27 April 1968) is a former Australian rules football coach and player. He was the head coach of the North Melbourne Football Club in the Australian Football League (AFL) from 2023 to 2026 and the Hawthorn Football Club from 2005 to 2021, where he won four premierships (2008, 2013, 2014, 2015).

Hailing from the small town of Kaniva, Victoria, Clarkson played eleven seasons of AFL football – nine for North Melbourne (1987–1995) followed by two for Melbourne (1996–1997). He played 134 games in total, playing either in the midfield or on the half-forward flanks. After retiring from playing, Clarkson served for periods as an assistant coach at St Kilda (1999), head coach of VFL club Werribee (2000), head coach of SANFL club Central District (2001–2002), and assistant coach at Port Adelaide (2003–2004).

Clarkson was appointed senior coach of Hawthorn at the end of the 2004 season, in which the club had placed second-last. Hawthorn returned to the finals in 2007, Clarkson's third season in charge, and the following year defeated Geelong in the grand final to claim their first premiership since 1991. From 2012 to 2015, Clarkson cemented his place in club history by coaching Hawthorn to four consecutive grand finals. The Hawks emerged victorious in 2013, 2014, and 2015, becoming only the sixth team in league history to win three consecutive premierships. Clarkson is one of the few men to have coached four premiership teams and is widely considered among the most innovative and successful coaches in AFL history.

== Early life ==
Clarkson grew up in the small rural town of Kaniva, Victoria. He moved to Ballarat at the age of 14 to board at Ballarat Clarendon College, where he played in the school cricket and football teams. When not playing for his school, Clarkson would play for the Kaniva & Districts Football Club in the Tatiara Football League.

== Playing career ==
=== North Melbourne ===
Clarkson was recruited by the North Melbourne Football Club, where he made his Victorian Football League debut in round 15 of the 1987 season against Melbourne, kicking the winning goal after the siren.

Clarkson was 19 and at the end of his first season with North Melbourne when the Kangaroos met Carlton in October 1987 in the controversial "Battle of Britain", an exhibition match at The Oval in London. Several players from both teams were suspended after a spiteful game, with Clarkson receiving a four-match penalty for coward punching Ian Aitken from behind being the longest. Aitken's jaw was broken from the attack.

He played mainly as a half-forward and stood at 171 cm, before moving into the midfield. In 1995, he was made captain of the reserves side, with chances of senior selection unlikely due to the presence of midfielders such as Wayne Schwass, Anthony Stevens and Anthony Rock. He played 93 games with the Kangaroos for 61 goals in his nine seasons until 1995.

During his playing days with North Melbourne, Clarkson was employed by Wesley College, Melbourne, as a physical education teacher.

=== Melbourne ===
With limited opportunity at the Kangaroos, Clarkson was traded to the Melbourne Football Club where he debuted in 1996. He was a solid player and averaged 23.5 disposals in 22 games that year. He played 19 games in 1997, taking his tally with the Demons to 41 games, before retiring at the end of the season. Clarkson served as a runner with the Melbourne Football Club in 1998.

== Coaching career ==
=== St Kilda Football Club assistant coach ===
Clarkson was an assistant coach under senior coach Tim Watson at the St Kilda Football Club in 1999.

=== Werribee Football Club head coach ===
Clarkson took over as head coach at Werribee in the VFL in 2000.

=== Central District Football Club senior coach ===
He moved to Central District in South Australia, where he was the premiership coach in his debut year in 2001. In 2002, Clarkson guided Central District to the SANFL minor premiership and guided them to their second successive SANFL Grand Final. However, they ended up losing to Sturt.

=== Port Adelaide Football Club assistant coach ===
In 2003, Clarkson became an assistant coach in the position of midfield coach at Port Adelaide Football Club under senior coach Mark Williams and was part of their coaching team in the club's 2004 premiership.

=== Hawthorn Football Club senior coach (2005–2021) ===
Clarkson was appointed to his first senior Australian Football League (AFL) coaching role for the 2005 season when the Hawks appointed him to lead their rebuilding phase. Clarkson replaced Hawthorn Football Club caretaker senior coach Donald McDonald, who replaced Peter Schwab during the 2004 season, after Schwab quit during the season when the Hawks were struggling and eventually finished in second-last placed position on the ladder at the end of the 2004 season. Clarkson was prepared to delist older players and introduce a youth policy. Club veterans Rayden Tallis, Mark Graham, Kris Barlow, Luke McCabe and Lance Picioane left the club and Nathan Thompson was traded to North Melbourne. Hawthorn under Clarkson had five wins in Clarkson's debut season as senior coach of the Hawthorn Football Club in the 2005 season. Another round of culling saw the delisting of Angelo Lekkas and Nick Holland and the trade of Jonathan Hay and Nathan Lonie. Clarkson brought to the club delisted players Brent Guerra and Stephen Gilham whom he knew from his time at Port Adelaide. In the 2006 season, the side under Clarkson improved as Clarkson showed innovation by restructuring the forwards with a system that became known as "Buddy's box". The team won its last four games in a row to finish in 11th spot on the ladder at the end of the 2006 season. The Hawks under Clarkson continued to improve in the 2007 season, winning 13 games and finishing fifth on the premiership table. This took them into the finals, where they defeated Adelaide in an elimination final, before being eliminated in a semi-final against North Melbourne.

Clarkson went against his own policy on draft day 2007 when, in addition to youngster Cyril Rioli, he recruited the recently retired Stuart Dew, whom he also knew from his time at Port Adelaide. He also introduced a new style of play that became known as the "Clarkson cluster".

Early dominance in the 2008 season led Hawthorn to announce that Clarkson had signed a contract until the end of 2011. In the 2008 season, Clarkson took the Hawks to second place at the end of the minor round before coaching the team to the premiership victory in the 2008 AFL Grand Final, when Hawthorn defeated Geelong by a margin of 26 points, with the final score Hawthorn 18.7 (115) to Geelong 11.23 (89), Geelong had lost only one game during the year. In doing so, Clarkson became the first (and, as of 2017, only) person to be a premiership-winning coach in both the AFL/VFL and the SANFL.

After the 2008 premiership, opposition teams worked hard at picking the "Clarkson cluster" apart. Dogged by injuries to key players, the Hawks under Clarkson slipped down the ladder to finish ninth at the end of the 2009 season and therefore just missed out of the finals. After a poor start to the 2010 season, when the club under Clarkson lost six out of its first seven games, including an embarrassing 43-point loss to Essendon in Round 6, 2010 after which the entire club came under scrutiny, the team finally abandoned the cluster for a more precision-kicking style. Aided by recruiting established players to cover weaknesses, the club under Clarkson climbed its way back up the ladder and finished seventh on the ladder at the end of the 2010 season, therefore making the finals, but the Hawks under Clarkson were eliminated by Fremantle in the first week of the 2010 elimination final. In the 2011 season, the Hawks under Clarkson finished third on the ladder and made the finals, but were eliminated by the eventual runners-up Collingwood in the 2011 Preliminary Final.

In the 2012 season, Clarkson coached Hawthorn to the 2012 AFL Grand Final, but fell short and lost to Sydney Swans by a margin of 10 points with the final score Hawthorn 11.15 (81) to Sydney Swans 14.7 (91).

In the 2013 season, Clarkson again led the Hawks to another premiership win, this time over Fremantle in the 2013 AFL Grand Final with the score Hawthorn 11.11 (77) to Fremantle 8.14 (62).

Clarkson's additions of players with Shaun Burgoyne and Josh Gibson who arrived in 2010, David Hale in 2011, Jack Gunston in 2012 and Brian Lake in 2013, had a significant impact on the club.

In 2013, Clarkson became only the third man behind John Kennedy, Sr. and Allan Jeans to coach Hawthorn for 200 games. He is the only man to coach the club in 200 consecutive games. In Round 8, 2014, he became the equal second longest-serving coach of Hawthorn, with Allan Jeans, when he coached his 221st AFL match against the Sydney Swans.

Clarkson has been coach of the Australian team in the International Rules Series in 2014 and 2015. The IRS is a hybrid game played between an Australian team of AFL players and one made up of Irish Gaelic footballers at the end of each of their seasons. It is played alternately in Ireland and Australia. The 2014 game was the first time in the competition's 30-year history that just one game decided the series winner.

During the 2014 season in May 2014, Clarkson was admitted to hospital after a back injury which was later diagnosed as Guillain–Barré syndrome. Assistant coach Brendon Bolton became the interim senior coach for five matches, winning every game in Clarkson's absence. Clarkson returned in July after his absence of five matches, after Clarkson received an endorsement from his doctors to resume his role as senior coach. and coached Hawthorn to their 12th premiership win when they defeated Sydney Swans 21.11 (137) to 11.8 (74) in the 2014 AFL Grand Final. This placed him alongside Allan Jeans and John Kennedy Sr as Hawthorn's most successful premiership winning coaches, with three premierships each.

In the 2015 season, Clarkson coached Hawthorn to their third straight flag in the 2015 AFL Grand Final, when Hawthorn defeated West Coast Eagles 16.11 (107) to 8.13 (61). This made Clarkson Hawthorn's most successful coach, and tying Leigh Matthews as the only coaches to win three straight premierships in the 21st century.

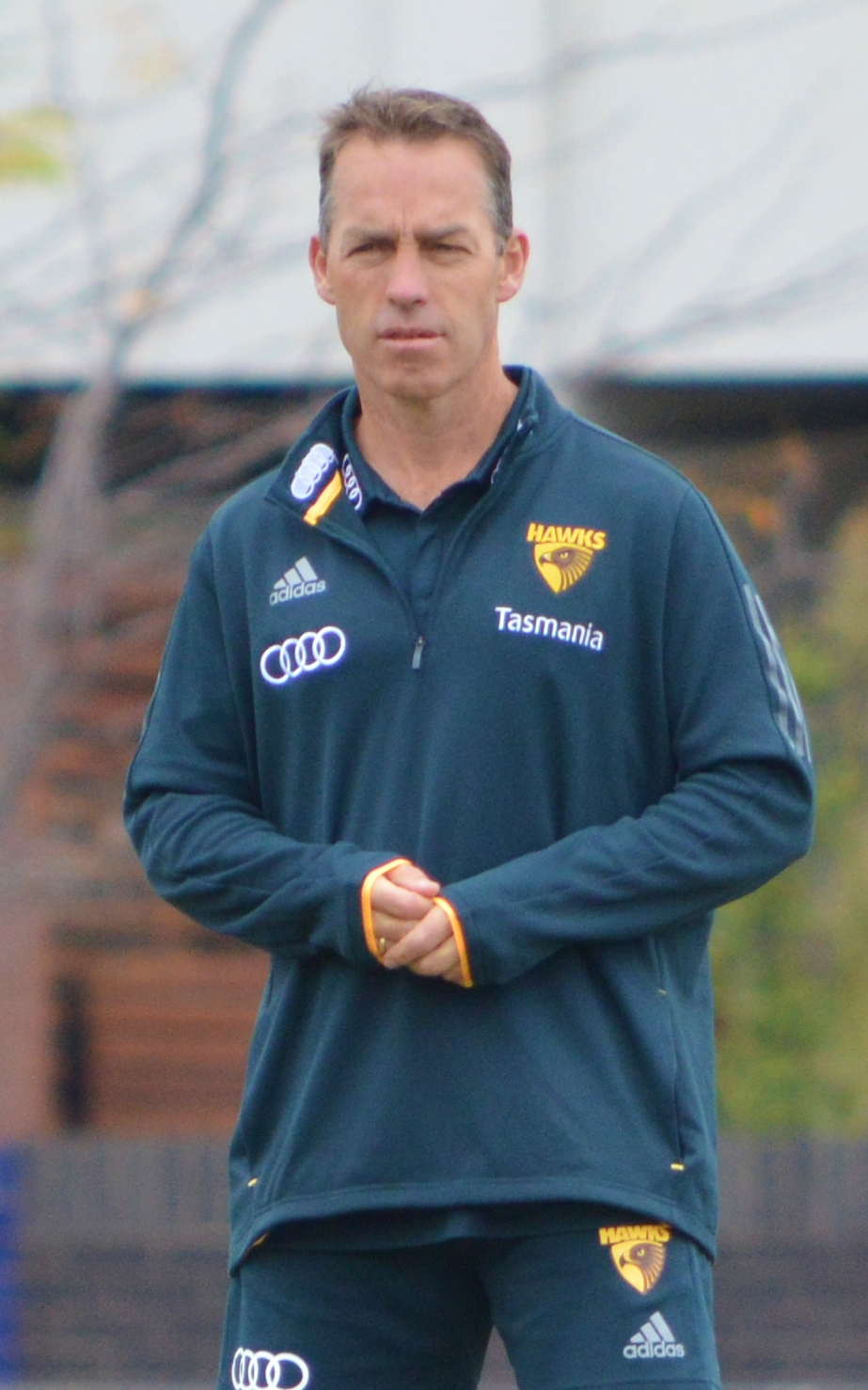
Clarkson coaching Hawthorn in 2017

In the 2016 season, the Hawks under Clarkson finished third on the ladder and again made the finals. But Hawthorn under Clarkson were eliminated by the eventual premiers the Western Bulldogs in the semi-final. In the 2017 season, Hawthorn under Clarkson fell back with the club's on-field performance and finished twelve on the ladder, therefore missing out of the finals. In the 2018 season, The Hawks under Clarkson returned to the finals when they finished fourth on the ladder, but were eliminated by Melbourne in the semi-final. In the 2019 season, the Hawks under Clarkson finished ninth on the ladder and therefore just missed out of the finals. In the 2020 season, the Hawks under Clarkson fell back with a disastrous deterioration in the club's on-field performance and finished fifteenth place (fourth-last) placed position on the ladder with five wins and twelve losses.

On 6 July 2021, the Hawthorn Football Club announced that it will implement a succession plan which will see Clarkson coach out his current contract, before being succeeded as senior coach by assistant coach Sam Mitchell from 2023. However, on 30 July 2021, it was announced that Clarkson would leave Hawthorn at the conclusion of the 2021 AFL season, with Mitchell immediately succeeding him.

In Clarkson's final season as senior coach of Hawthorn Football Club in the 2021 season, the Hawks under Clarkson finished fourteenth on the ladder (fifth-last) position on the ladder.

Clarkson coached Hawthorn Football Club from 2005 until 2021, for a total of 17 seasons, with a record of 390 games with 228 wins, 158 losses and 4 draws with a winning percentage of 60 percent. Clarkson also coached the club to a total of four premierships in 2008, 2013, 2014 and 2015 as well as when the club finished as runners-up in 2012.

In September 2022, following his departure from the club, he was alleged to have been involved in the isolation and separation of indigenous players from their partners and families, allegations which came to light as part of an external review into historical racism commissioned by Hawthorn. Investigations into the allegations are ongoing.

=== North Melbourne Football Club senior coach (2023–2026) ===
After David Noble was sacked as senior coach of North Melbourne and caretaker senior coach Leigh Adams took over for the remaining matches of the 2022 season, on 19 August 2022, it was announced that Clarkson would become senior coach of North Melbourne on a five-year contract, starting from the 2023 season. The appointment was described as a "homecoming" for him due to his playing career starting at the club.

In May 2023, just before the start of Round 10, Clarkson announced that he would step away from his role as North Melbourne senior coach indefinitely, citing mental health as a result of the investigation into alleged historical racism during his time at Hawthorn. He would have coached his 400th game that weekend against the Sydney Swans. Assistant coach Brett Ratten, who had been caretaker senior coach at two previous clubs, was announced as Clarkson's caretaker. Clarkson resumed his role as senior coach of North Melbourne in Round 21, 2023 against Melbourne.

Clarkson was sacked as senior coach of the North Melbourne Football Club in September 2026 at the end of the 2026 AFL season after North Melbourne failed to qualify for finals. Clarkson was replaced by Jaymie Graham as senior coach of North Melbourne.

== Clarkson proteges ==
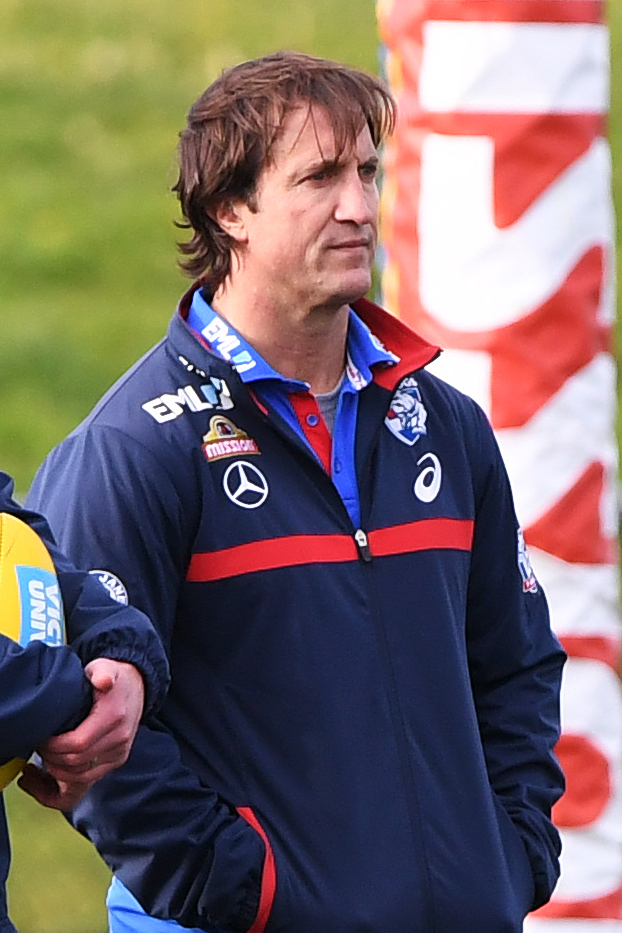
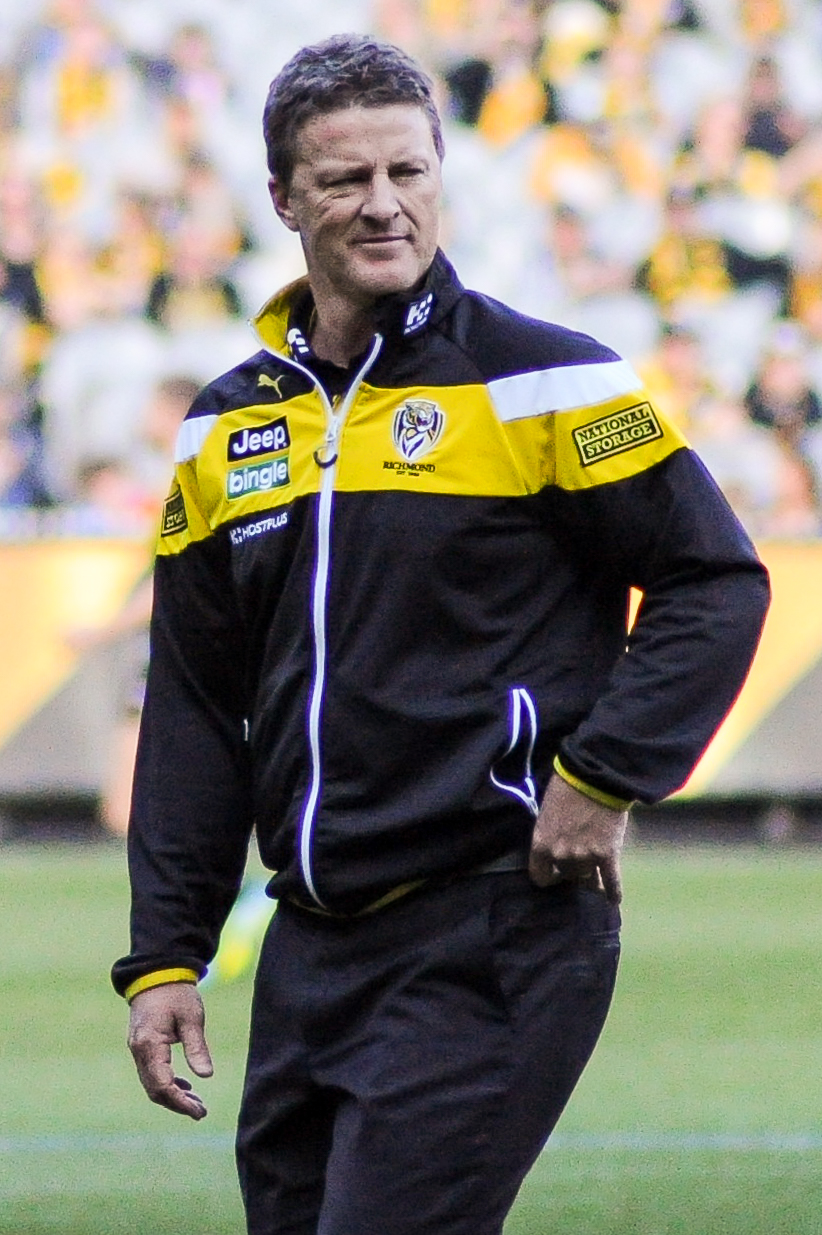
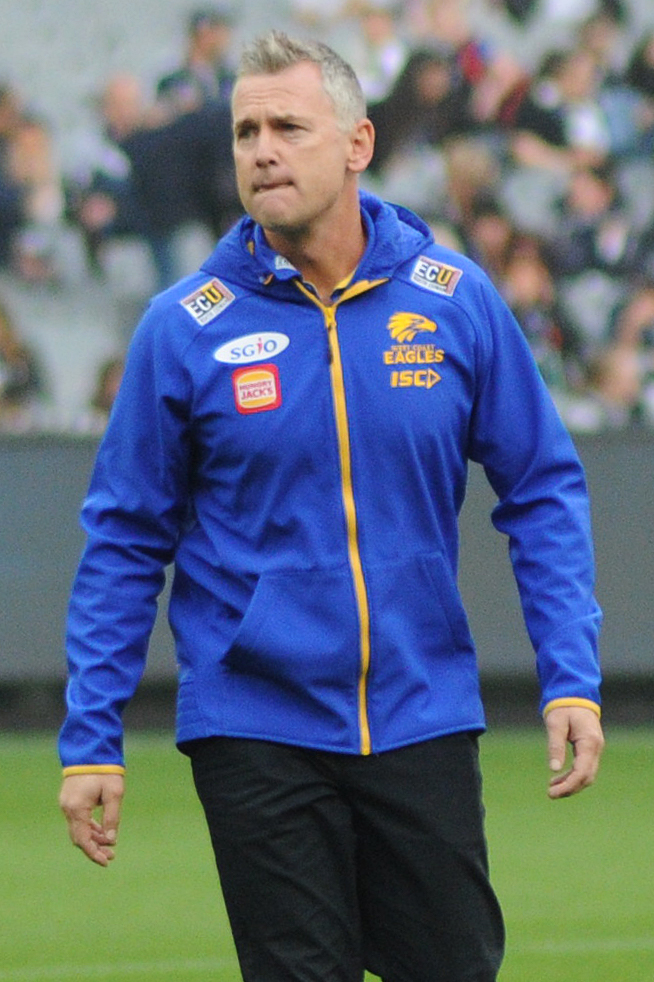
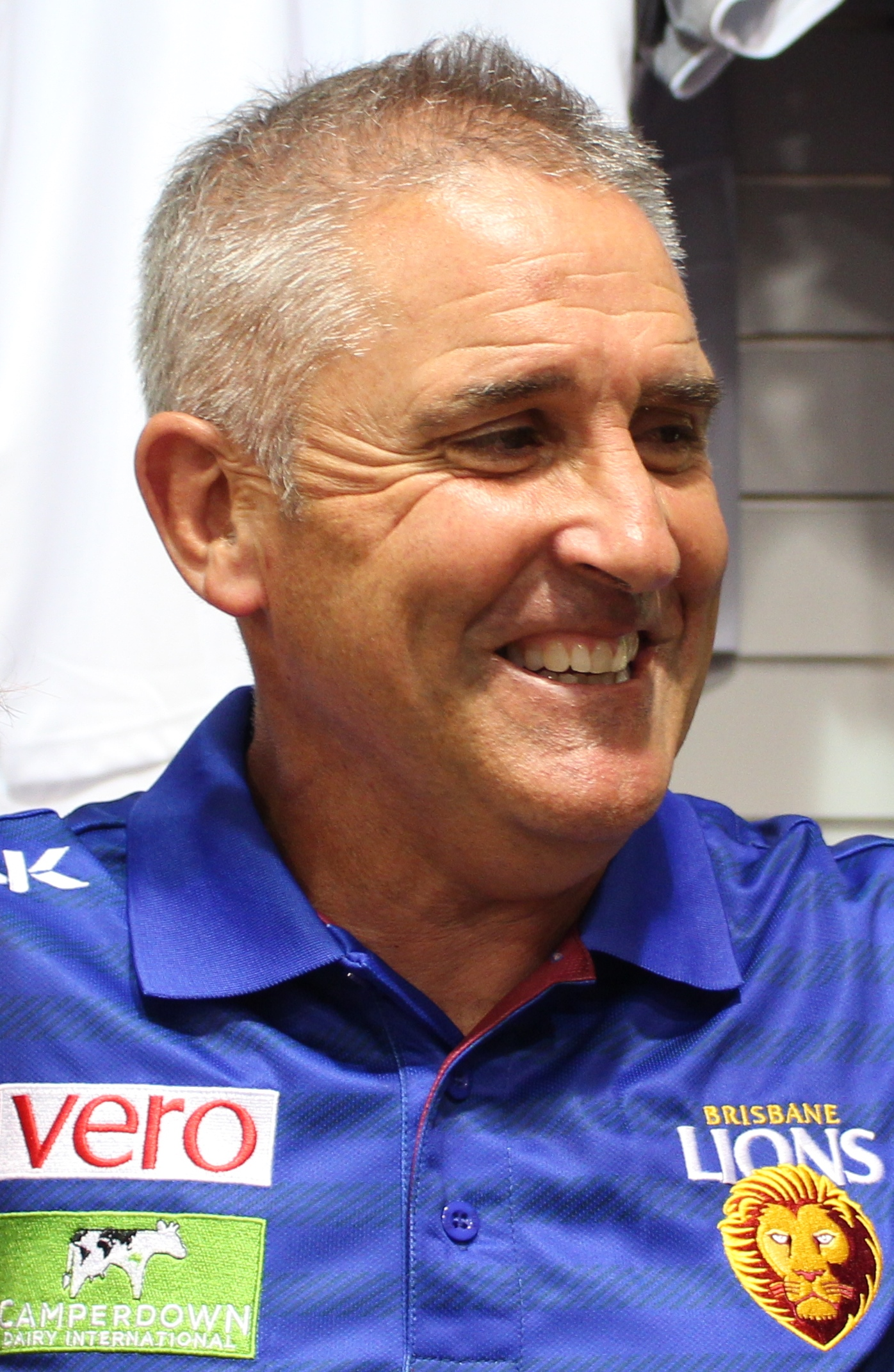
Luke Beveridge, Damien Hardwick, Adam Simpson and Chris Fagan all served as assistant coaches to Alastair Clarkson before going on to become premiership-winning head coaches.

A number of Clarkson's assistants have gone on to coach at senior level in the AFL. Notably, Clarkson and his proteges have collectively appeared in 13 out of 14 AFL Grand Finals and won 12 out of 14 AFL premierships since 2012.

- Damien Hardwick, Richmond (2010–2023; 2017, 2019 and 2020 premiership coach), Gold Coast (2024–present)
- Todd Viney, Melbourne (2011 caretaker coach)
- Leon Cameron, Greater Western Sydney (2014–2022)
- Adam Simpson, West Coast (2014–2024; 2018 premiership coach)
- Luke Beveridge, Western Bulldogs (2015–present; 2016 premiership coach)
- John Barker, Carlton (2015 caretaker coach)
- Brendon Bolton, Hawthorn (2014 caretaker coach), Carlton (2016–2019)^{1}
- Chris Fagan, Brisbane Lions (2017–2026; 2024–2025–2026 premiership coach)
- Brett Ratten, St Kilda (2019 caretaker coach, 2020–2022),^{2} North Melbourne (2023 interim coach)^{6}
- Sam Mitchell, Hawthorn (2022–)^{3}
- Craig McRae, Collingwood, (2022–; 2023 premiership coach)
- Adem Yze, Melbourne (2022 caretaker coach),^{4} Richmond (2024–)
- Scott Burns, Adelaide (2022 caretaker coach)^{5}
- Cameron Bruce, Brisbane Lions (2027–present)

^{1} Bolton returned to Hawthorn soon after his tenure as Carlton coach ended in round 11, 2019.
^{2} Ratten had previously coached at Carlton between 2007 and 2012 before joining Hawthorn as an assistant coach in 2013.
^{3} Mitchell succeeded Clarkson as coach at the conclusion of the 2021 AFL season.
^{4} Yze filled in for Simon Goodwin for one match in round 7, 2022, due to Goodwin entering the AFL's health and safety protocols.
^{5} Burns filled in for Matthew Nicks for one match in round 8, 2022, due to Nicks entering the AFL's health and safety protocols.
^{6} Ratten filled in for Clarkson as senior coach of North Melbourne for ten matches in 2023, due to Clarkson taking leave.

== Statistics ==
=== Playing statistics ===
Legend
G	Goals	K	Kicks	D	Disposals	T	Tackles
B	Behinds	H	Handballs	M	Marks

Season	Team	No.	Games	Totals							Averages (per game)							Votes
Season	Team	No.	Games	G	B	K	H	D	M	T	G	B	K	H	D	M	T	Votes
1987	North Melbourne	57	8	7	8	67	34	101	15	4	0.9	1.0	8.4	4.3	12.6	1.9	0.5	0
1988	North Melbourne	23	19	34	23	230	99	329	102	12	1.8	1.2	12.1	5.2	17.3	5.4	0.6	2
1989	North Melbourne	23	13	8	11	136	63	199	40	13	0.6	0.8	10.5	4.8	15.3	3.1	1.0	0
1990	North Melbourne	23	7	2	7	74	30	104	21	5	0.3	1.0	10.6	4.3	14.9	3.0	0.7	0
1991	North Melbourne	23	5	1	3	31	30	61	10	0	0.2	0.6	6.2	6.0	12.2	2.0	0.0	0
1992	North Melbourne	23	10	2	3	85	62	147	24	10	0.2	0.3	8.5	6.2	14.7	2.4	1.0	0
1993	North Melbourne	23	14	1	2	98	60	158	16	18	0.1	0.1	7.0	4.3	11.3	1.1	1.3	0
1994	North Melbourne	23	14	6	3	119	67	186	20	23	0.4	0.2	8.5	4.8	13.3	1.4	1.6	0
1995	North Melbourne	23	3	0	2	10	7	17	2	1	0.0	0.7	3.3	2.3	5.7	0.7	0.3	0
1996	Melbourne	23	22	13	12	369	150	519	107	35	0.6	0.5	16.8	6.8	23.6	4.9	1.6	2
1997	Melbourne	23	19	11	1	202	88	290	61	28	0.6	0.1	10.6	4.6	15.3	3.2	1.5	1
Career			134	85	75	1421	690	2111	418	149	0.6	0.6	10.6	5.1	15.8	3.1	1.1	5

== Head coaching record ==
Updated to the end of round 16, 2026

Team	Year	Home and Away Season					Finals			
Team	Year	Won	Lost	Drew	Win %	Position	Won	Lost	Win %	Result
HAW	2005	5	17	0	.227	14th out of 16	—	—	—	—
HAW	2006	9	13	0	.409	11th out of 16	—	—	—	—
HAW	2007	13	9	0	.591	5th out of 16	1	1	.500	Lost to North Melbourne in Semi Final
HAW	2008	17	5	0	.773	2nd out of 16	3	0	1.000	Defeated Geelong in Grand Final
HAW	2009	9	13	0	.409	9th out of 16	—	—	—	—
HAW	2010	12	9	1	.568	7th out of 16	0	1	.000	Lost to Fremantle in Elimination Final
HAW	2011	18	4	0	.818	3rd out of 17	1	2	.333	Lost to Collingwood in Preliminary Final
HAW	2012	17	5	0	.773	1st out of 18	2	1	.667	Lost to Sydney in Grand Final
HAW	2013	19	3	0	.864	1st out of 18	3	0	1.000	Defeated Fremantle in Grand Final
HAW	2014*	12	5	0	.706	2nd out of 18	3	0	1.000	Defeated Sydney in Grand Final
HAW	2015	16	6	0	.727	3rd out of 18	3	1	.750	Defeated West Coast in Grand Final
HAW	2016	17	5	0	.773	3rd out of 18	0	2	.000	Lost to Western Bulldogs in Semi Final
HAW	2017	10	11	1	.477	12th out of 18	—	—	—	—
HAW	2018	15	7	0	.682	4th out of 18	0	2	.000	Lost to Melbourne in Semi Final
HAW	2019	11	11	0	.500	9th out of 18	—	—	—	—
HAW	2020	5	12	0	.294	15th out of 18	—	—	—	—
HAW	2021	7	13	2	.364	14th out of 18	—	—	—	—
HAW Total		212	148	4	.593		16	10	.615	
NM	2023	3	10	0	.130	17th out of 18	—	—	—	—
NM	2024	3	20	0	.130	17th out of 18	—	—	—	—
NM	2025	5	17	1	.239	16th out of 18	—	—	—	—
NM	2026	9	14	0	.391	14th out of 18	—	—	—	—
NM Total		20	61	1	.250		—	—	—	
Total		232	209	5	.529		16	10	.615	

- *Clarkson was unable to coach for five matches in 2014 after being diagnosed with Guillain–Barré syndrome

== Honours and achievements ==
Team

- 4× AFL premiership coach (Hawthorn): 2008, 2013, 2014, 2015
- 2× Minor premiership (Hawthorn): 2012, 2013
- SANFL premiership coach (Central District): 2001
- 2× Minor premiership (Central District): 2001, 2002

Individual

- 4× Jock McHale Medal: 2008, 2013, 2014, 2015
- 4× All-Australian team: 2008, 2013, 2014, 2015
- 2× Australia international rules football team: 2014, 2015

== Temperament ==
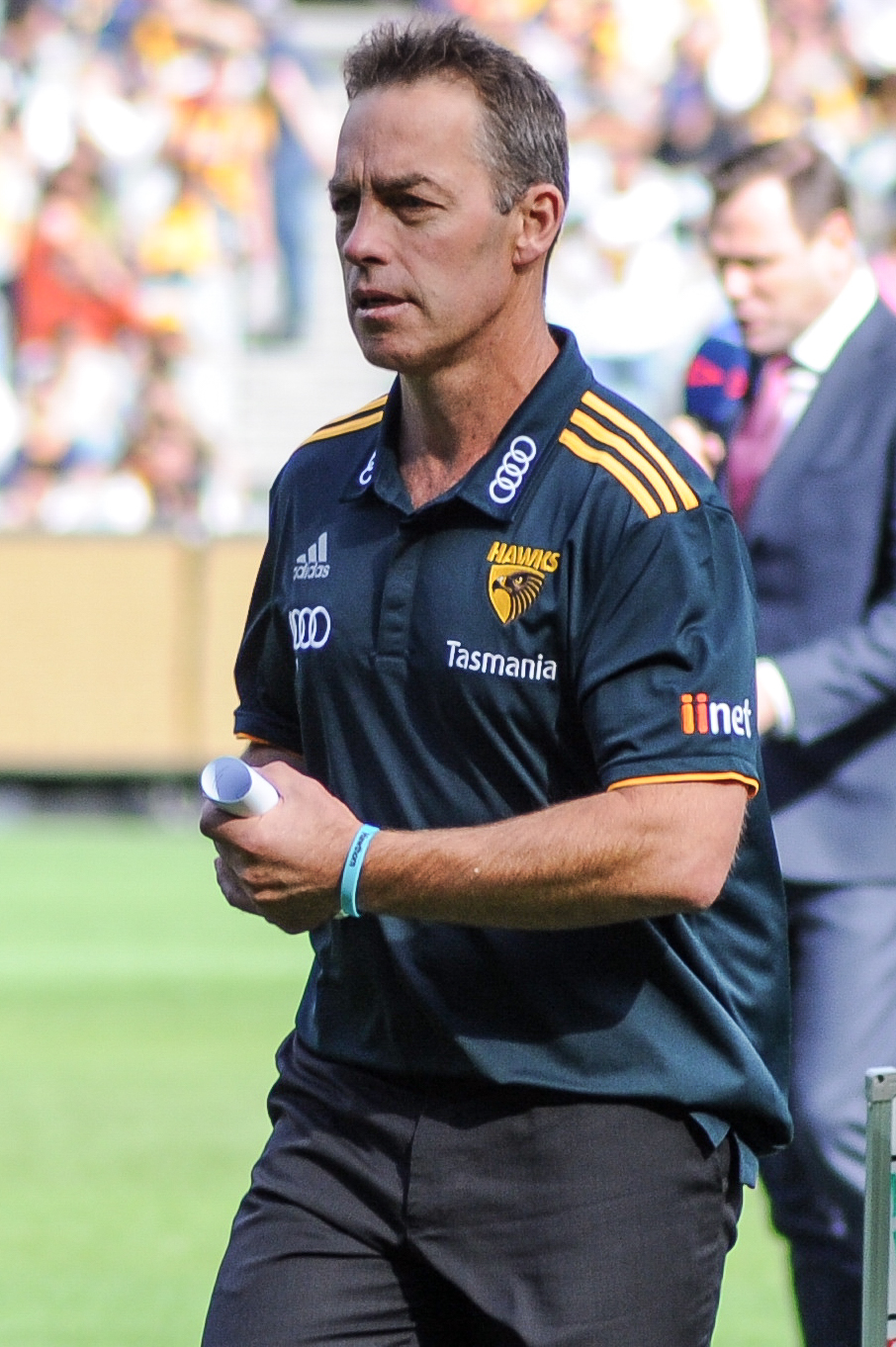
Clarkson in 2017

In addition to his role in the Battle of Britain exhibition match, Clarkson has been sanctioned for his bad temper on several occasions during his coaching career. In Round 22, 2009, against Essendon, Clarkson was fined $15,000 for confronting and threatening Matthew Lloyd after Lloyd had flattened Hawthorn's Brad Sewell and started a brawl at the start of the third quarter of the match, and for abusing an interchange steward who attempted to intervene in the incident.

In July 2012, while serving as the runner for his son's team in a South Metro Junior Football League under-9s match, Clarkson was reported for abusing 19-year-old umpires' adviser Thomas Grundy; he was suspended for four SMJFL matches for the incident. The incident occurred one day after he had punched a hole in the wall of a Melbourne Cricket Ground coaches' box during an AFL match.

In May 2013, Clarkson again created controversy after calling AFL Media journalist Matt Thompson a "cockhead".

After Hawthorn's Round 4 loss to Port Adelaide in 2015, footage was released of Clarkson appearing to grab the throat of a fan outside a hotel in Adelaide. After the club defended his actions, Clarkson suggested he was worried about his safety as three heavily intoxicated men had made physical contact with him after he refused photos, causing Clarkson to push one of the men. Unlike his previous incidents, Clarkson received almost unanimous support within the football industry, as well as from the general public over his actions.

In 2024 during the AFL pre-season, Clarkson was fined $25,000 and given a 2-match suspended sentence for approaching Jimmy Webster for his bump on Jy Simpkin, reportedly calling Webster a "cocksucker".

In May 2024, Clarkson was investigated for, and ultimately cleared of, verbally abusing umpires during North Melbourne's loss to Port Adelaide.

After his sacking in September 2026, Clarkson was condemned for a comment made to AFLW players in an elevator.

== Personal life ==
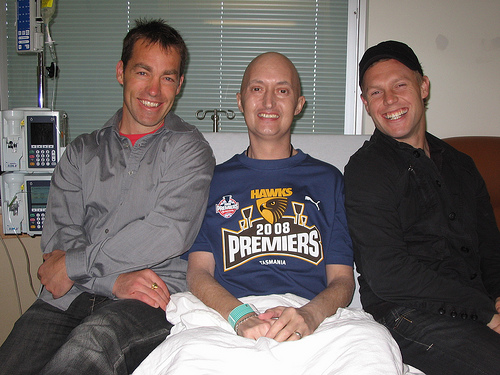
Clarkson in 2008

Clarkson holds a Master of Business Administration from Monash University, and also a Bachelor of Sports Science. Clarkson is married with three children.
