= Jarrad Boumann =

Australian rules footballer

Personal information
- Full name: Jarrad Boumann
- Born: 18 August 1989 (age 37) d
- Original team: Dandenong Stingrays (TAC Cup)
- Draft: No. 48, 2007 national draft
- Debut: Round 1, 2012, Hawthorn vs. Collingwood, at Melbourne Cricket Ground
- Height: 198 cm (6 ft 6 in)
- Weight: 93 kg (205 lb)
- Position: Defender

Playing career^{1}
Years	Club	Games (Goals)
2008–2010	Western Bulldogs	0 (0)
2012	Hawthorn	2 (0)
- ^{1} Playing statistics correct to the end of 2012.

Jarrad Boumann (born 18 August 1989) is a former Australian rules footballer who played for the Hawthorn Football Club in the Australian Football League (AFL). After having been drafted by the Western Bulldogs in 2007 and subsequently delisted, Boumann was picked up by Hawthorn via the concessions allowed to the AFL's newest club, Greater Western Sydney.

Boumann was drafted in from Box Hill as part of a trade deal with Greater Western Sydney and, at only 22, after a few fruitless years on the Western Bulldogs' list.

Boumann made his debut in round 1, against Collingwood. After a game against St Kilda, he reported stomach pains. Boumann had surgery to remove his appendix. Boumann later injured his hand in a fight outside a city nightclub on 22 July 2012. Boumann has told club officials he punched one of his attackers in self-defence, fracturing his hand. Police have begun investigating the incident, which occurred near the corner of Exhibition and Lonsdale streets as Boumann and a friend tried to hail a taxi about 2.45am. Boumann says he was kicked repeatedly. Two men were arrested and questioned about 45 minutes later.

Boumann was announced delisted by the Hawks as of the 12 October 2012.

Boumann currently plays for East Wagga Kooringal Hawks Football Club

== Statistics ==
Legend
G	Goals	K	Kicks	D	Disposals	T	Tackles
B	Behinds	H	Handballs	M	Marks

Season	Team	No.	Games	Totals							Averages (per game)							Votes
Season	Team	No.	Games	G	B	K	H	D	M	T	G	B	K	H	D	M	T	Votes
2008	Western Bulldogs	32	0	—	—	—	—	—	—	—	—	—	—	—	—	—	—	0
2009	Western Bulldogs	32	0	—	—	—	—	—	—	—	—	—	—	—	—	—	—	0
2010	Western Bulldogs	32	0	—	—	—	—	—	—	—	—	—	—	—	—	—	—	0
2012	Hawthorn	31	2	0	0	3	7	10	1	5	0.0	0.0	1.5	3.5	5.0	0.5	2.5	0
Career			2	0	0	3	7	10	1	5	0.0	0.0	1.5	3.5	5.0	0.5	2.5	0

== Honours and achievements ==
Team

- Minor premiership (Hawthorn): 2012
