= Michael Johnston (Australian footballer) =

Australian rules footballer (born 1971)

Personal information
- Full name: Michael Johnston
- Born: 16 February 1971 (age 55)
- Original team: Leongatha
- Height: 182 cm (6 ft 0 in)
- Weight: 85 kg (187 lb)

Playing career^{1}
Years	Club	Games (Goals)
1991–1994	Hawthorn	8 (4)
1995	Footscray	2 (0)
Total		10 (4)
- ^{1} Playing statistics correct to the end of 1995.

Michael Johnston (born 16 February 1971) is a former Australian rules footballer who played with Hawthorn and Footscray in the Australian Football League (AFL).

A Leongatha recruit, Johnston appeared only sporadically for Hawthorn, his biggest run in the team coming late in the 1992 season when he made four appearances. His best game was his AFL debut, against the Brisbane Bears at Princes Park, where he kicked two goals and had 20 disposals.

Johnston went to Footscray via the 1995 Pre-Season Draft and played two senior games for his new club in 1995.
