= Richie Vandenberg =

Australian rules footballer, born 1977

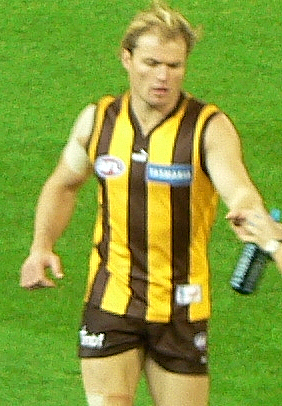

Personal information
- Born: 14 January 1977 (age 49)
- Original team: Mildura Demons SFNL Sunraysia Football & Netball League
- Debut: Round 17, 25 July 1998, Hawthorn vs. Port Adelaide, at Football Park
- Height: 178 cm (5 ft 10 in)
- Weight: 87 kg (192 lb)

Playing career^{1}
Years	Club	Games (Goals)
1998–2007	Hawthorn	145 (64)
- ^{1} Playing statistics correct to the end of 2007.

Career highlights
- Hawthorn captain: 2005–2007

Richard Vandenberg (born 14 January 1977) is a former Australian rules footballer who played for the Hawthorn Football Club in the Australian Football League (AFL). He served as the captain of the Hawks from 2005 to 2007, the final three years of his career.

== Early years ==
Vandenberg is of Dutch descent. Growing in the agricultural district of Coomealla, with the town centre of Dareton, New South Wales, a small town near Mildura just on the northern side of the Murray River in far western New South Wales, Vandenberg played junior football for the local club. He moved to Melbourne to study at the University of Melbourne in 1995, playing with University Blues, where he attracted the attention of Hawthorn recruiters.

== Football career ==
Vandenberg was selected with pick 78 in the 1997 AFL draft. He was a solidly built player with a reputation for aggressive play, fronting the AFL Tribunal on many occasions. In 2004, he was involved in the 'Line in the Sand' incident, in which Hawthorn and Essendon engaged in an all-out brawl during the third quarter of their round 11 match. As a result, he was suspended for six games.

Vandenberg was made captain of Hawthorn when Shane Crawford stepped down at the end of the 2004 season. New coach Alastair Clarkson chose Vandenberg because he was a man who was "very forthright, honest and has great integrity", qualities his teammates admired.

He initially struggled to recapture his best form, but by 2006 had fitted into his new role more solidly. Vandenberg's 2007 season was marred by injuries, and retired at the end of the year after leading the Hawks to their most successful campaign since 2001.

== Professional career ==
Vandenberg completed his Bachelor of Business at Swinburne University of Technology. He has a long association in the wine industry as a grower through his family enterprise and is the chief executive officer of LCW Corp, a grape and wine producing company.

In 2016, Vandenberg was appointed to the Hawthorn board to fill the casual vacancy following Andrew Newbold's resignation. Vandenberg resigned from the board following the 2022 board election, when his preferred candidate was defeated by popular vote.
