= Carl Peterson (Australian footballer) =

Australian rules footballer

Personal information
- Full name: Carl Peterson
- Born: 3 July 1987 (age 39); Meekatharra, Western Australia
- Original team: Claremont (WAFL)
- Draft: No. 60, 2006 national draft
- Debut: Round 1, 2010, Hawthorn vs. Melbourne, at Melbourne Cricket Ground
- Height: 183 cm (6 ft 0 in)
- Weight: 70 kg (154 lb)

Playing career^{1}
Years	Club	Games (Goals)
2007	Richmond	0 (0)
2009–2010	Hawthorn	17 (13)
Total		17 (13)
- ^{1} Playing statistics correct to the end of 2010.

Carl Peterson (born 3 July 1987) is a former Australian rules football player with the Hawthorn Football Club in the Australian Football League. Peterson was also listed with the Richmond Football Club but did not play a game.

Peterson was born in Meekatharra, Western Australia, and moved to Kununurra when he was two before moving to Perth to complete high school, where he trained and played football with the Clontarf Football Academy.

Recruited by Western Australian Football League (WAFL) club Claremont, Peterson played five games for Claremont in 2006, including two finals. His form for Claremont convinced Richmond to draft Peterson in the 2006 AFL draft, with pick number 60.

Richmond delisted Peterson at the end of the 2007 season without playing a game, and he joined Northern Territory Football League (NTFL) club St Mary's and was in the Saints' 2007/08 premiership side. He was then drafted by Hawthorn with pick 61 of the 2009 Rookie Draft.

Peterson made his AFL debut in the opening round of the 2010 AFL season and performed well, kicking a goal and gathering 15 disposals in the first half before copping a heavy knock early in the second half. He played seventeen games for Hawthorn, all in 2010.

In 2012, Peterson signed to play for the Victorian Football League's Northern Blues. He spent the previous year (2011) playing for Old Carey in the VAFA.

More recently, Peterson played for the Perth Football League team SNESA.

== Statistics ==
Legend
G	Goals	K	Kicks	D	Disposals	T	Tackles
B	Behinds	H	Handballs	M	Marks

Season	Team	No.	Games	Totals							Averages (per game)							Votes
Season	Team	No.	Games	G	B	K	H	D	M	T	G	B	K	H	D	M	T	Votes
2007	Richmond	28	0	—	—	—	—	—	—	—	—	—	—	—	—	—	—	0
2009	Hawthorn	48	0	—	—	—	—	—	—	—	—	—	—	—	—	—	—	0
2010	Hawthorn	48	17	13	9	131	89	220	73	53	0.8	0.5	7.7	5.2	12.9	4.3	3.1	0
Career			17	13	9	131	89	220	73	53	0.8	0.5	7.7	5.2	12.9	4.3	3.1	0
