= Rick Ladson =

Australian rules footballer

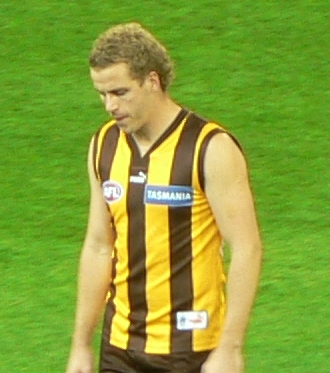

Personal information
- Full name: Rick Ladson
- Born: 18 February 1984 (age 42)
- Original team: Bendigo Pioneers (TAC Cup)
- Draft: No. 16, 2001 national draft
- Debut: Round 6, 2003, Hawthorn vs. Carlton, at Optus Oval
- Height: 181 cm (5 ft 11 in)
- Weight: 86 kg (190 lb)
- Position: Defender / Midfielder

Club information
- Current club: Murrabit Football Netball Club, Central Murray Football Netball League (coach)

Playing career^{1}
| Years | Club | Games (Goals) |
| 2002–2011 | Hawthorn | 125 (45) |
- ^{1} Playing statistics correct to the end of 2011.

Career highlights
- AFL premiership player: 2008

Rick Ladson (born 18 February 1984) is a former Australian Rules Football player who played with the Hawthorn Football Club in the Australian Football League.

== AFL career ==
Ladson was selected at no. 16 in the 2001 AFL draft from the Bendigo Pioneers and is a defender and outside midfielder.

He debuted in Round 6, 2003, against the Carlton Football Club and continued to play six of 22 possible games in 2003. In 2004 he suffered a fractured wrist in a pre-season game and missed the first seven games. In 2006, Ladson played all 22 games with an average of 18 disposals per game and finished ninth in the Best and Fairest. In 2007, Ladson continued his form, missing only two games in the home and away season and playing two finals games.

Ladson played in every game of the 2008 season, culminating in being a part of Hawthorn's premiership winning side. During the 2008 AFL Grand Final, he kicked the goal that was widely regarded as having sealed the game for the Hawks. He had arthroscopic surgery on his left knee after that season, delaying his return until Round 13. He only played three games before he injured his right knee, which also required surgery and resulted in Ladson missing the remainder of the season.

== Post-AFL Career ==
For the 2012 season he was working with the Essendon Football Club as a development coach.

In 2013, Ladson was the playing-coach for the Golden Square Football Club in the Bendigo Football League, coaching them to their fifth consecutive premiership.

Ladson has been the coach of Sedgwick Cricket Club since the 2014/15 season.

== Statistics ==
Legend
| G | Goals | K | Kicks | D | Disposals | T | Tackles |
| B | Behinds | H | Handballs | M | Marks |

| Season | Team | No. | Games | Totals | | | | | | | Averages (per game) | | | | | | | Votes |
| Season | Team | No. | Games | G | B | K | H | D | M | T | G | B | K | H | D | M | T | Votes |
|---|---|---|---|---|---|---|---|---|---|---|---|---|---|---|---|---|---|---|
| 2002 | Hawthorn | 18 | 0 | — | — | — | — | — | — | — | — | — | — | — | — | — | — | 0 |
| 2003 | Hawthorn | 18 | 6 | 5 | 4 | 38 | 14 | 52 | 13 | 10 | 0.8 | 0.7 | 6.3 | 2.3 | 8.7 | 2.2 | 1.7 | 0 |
| 2004 | Hawthorn | 18 | 8 | 5 | 1 | 35 | 26 | 61 | 11 | 10 | 0.6 | 0.1 | 4.4 | 3.3 | 7.6 | 1.4 | 1.3 | 0 |
| 2005 | Hawthorn | 18 | 16 | 7 | 3 | 142 | 74 | 216 | 61 | 30 | 0.4 | 0.2 | 8.9 | 4.6 | 13.5 | 3.8 | 1.9 | 0 |
| 2006 | Hawthorn | 4 | 22 | 7 | 10 | 252 | 146 | 398 | 104 | 36 | 0.3 | 0.5 | 11.5 | 6.6 | 18.1 | 4.7 | 1.6 | 0 |
| 2007 | Hawthorn | 4 | 22 | 10 | 3 | 275 | 180 | 455 | 101 | 38 | 0.5 | 0.1 | 12.5 | 8.2 | 20.7 | 4.6 | 1.7 | 0 |
| 2008^{#} | Hawthorn | 4 | 25 | 3 | 9 | 229 | 261 | 490 | 106 | 69 | 0.1 | 0.4 | 9.2 | 10.4 | 19.6 | 4.2 | 2.8 | 0 |
| 2009 | Hawthorn | 4 | 3 | 1 | 0 | 19 | 27 | 46 | 6 | 8 | 0.3 | 0.0 | 6.3 | 9.0 | 15.3 | 2.0 | 2.7 | 0 |
| 2010 | Hawthorn | 4 | 13 | 5 | 6 | 127 | 76 | 203 | 36 | 43 | 0.4 | 0.5 | 9.8 | 5.8 | 15.6 | 2.8 | 3.3 | 0 |
| 2011 | Hawthorn | 4 | 10 | 2 | 3 | 92 | 52 | 144 | 26 | 36 | 0.2 | 0.3 | 9.2 | 5.2 | 14.4 | 2.6 | 3.6 | 0 |
| Career: | | | 125 | 45 | 39 | 1209 | 856 | 2065 | 464 | 280 | 0.4 | 0.3 | 9.7 | 6.8 | 16.5 | 3.7 | 2.2 | 0 |

== Honours and achievements ==
Team

- AFL premiership player (Hawthorn): 2008

Individual

- Hawthorn life member
