= Brendan Whitecross =

Australian rules footballer (born 1990)

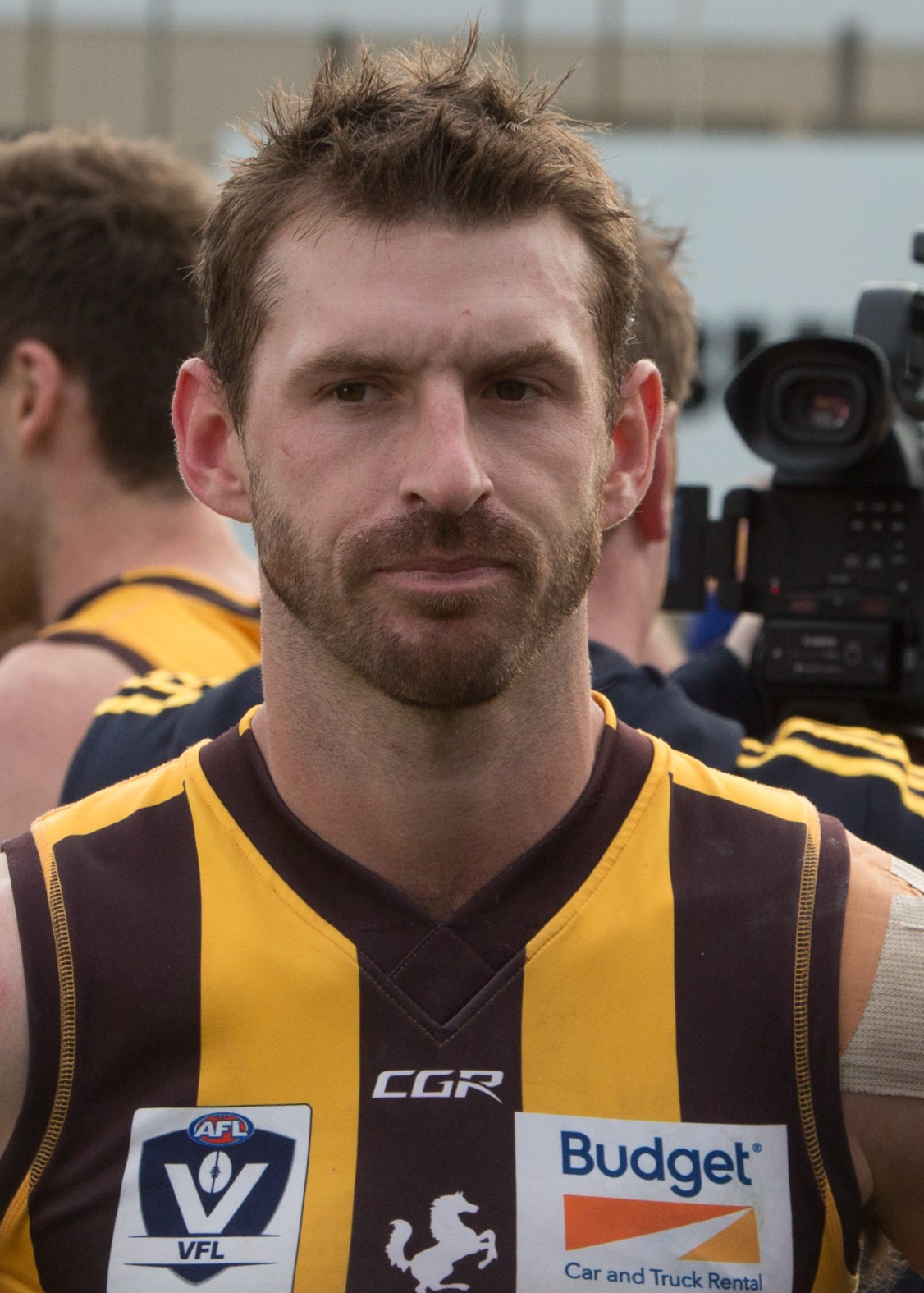
- Whitecross in September 2018

Personal information
- Full name: Brendan Whitecross
- Born: 25 January 1990 (age 36); Australia
- Original teams: Kedron Districts JFC; Zillmere Eagles AFC
- Draft: No. 29, 2007 national draft
- Debut: Round 1, 2009, Hawthorn vs. Geelong, at Melbourne Cricket Ground
- Height: 185 cm (6 ft 1 in)
- Weight: 86 kg (190 lb)
- Position: Defender

Playing career^{1}
Years	Club	Games (Goals)
2007–2018	Hawthorn	111 (45)
- ^{1} Playing statistics correct to the end of 2018.

Career highlights
- VFL premiership player: 2018

Brendan Whitecross (born 25 January 1990) is a former Australian rules footballer who played with the Hawthorn Football Club in the Australian Football League.

== Early career ==
He is an all round sportsman having represented his state in Athletics and is an accomplished cricketer, cross country runner, rugby union player and swimmer. Whitecross Captained his schools' St Patrick's College, Shorncliffe, Brisbane Athletics Squad and 1st Eleven Cricket Team.

Whitecross started his football life at the Kedron Districts Junior Football Club in Brisbane, Queensland playing there for 11 seasons before moving on to the Zillmere Eagles to commence his senior career. He represented Queensland in under 12s (2002), under 16s (2005–2006), captaining the team in 2006 and in under 18s in 2007. He was selected to the AIS/AFL Academy and travelled with the Australian under 17 team to South Africa in 2007.

== AFL career ==
Taken by Hawthorn with their second round draft pick in 2007, Whitecross spent the entire 2008 season in the VFL developing his craft with Hawthorn affiliate Box Hill.

Whitecross debuted in the round 1 grand final rematch against Geelong. On 14 June 2009, Whitecross re-signed with Hawthorn Football Club for two more seasons. Whitecross closed an outstanding 2009 season at Hawthorn by winning the club's 2009 "Most Improved Player" Award. He polled 31 votes to finish 19th in the best and fairest vote-count.

By 2011, Whitecross had secured his place in the Hawthorn line-up. It was his ability to apply pressure, to find the ball, present as a link up option going forward and uncanny goal sense that made him a dangerous player. This enabled him to become a link man as the Hawks moved the ball from the middle to the forward line.

Whitecross ruptured the anterior cruciate ligament in his right knee against Collingwood in the 2012 qualifying final, requiring a reconstruction.

Whitecross again ruptured the anterior cruciate ligament in his right knee against Geelong in the 2013 preliminary final. Hawthorn went on to win the game breaking an 11 game losing streak to Geelong since 2008. His injury meant he missed the 2013 AFL Grand Final and all of the 2014 AFL season.

On 29 October 2018, Whitecross was delisted by Hawthorn.

== Post AFL ==
Whitecross became a development coach with North Melbourne but because of Covid his time was cut short when the state government banned contact sports. Whitecross was appointed coach of the Knox Football Club who compete in the Eastern Football League for seasons 2021 and 2022.

== Statistics ==
Legend
G	Goals	K	Kicks	D	Disposals	T	Tackles
B	Behinds	H	Handballs	M	Marks

Season	Team	No.	Games	Totals							Averages (per game)							Votes
Season	Team	No.	Games	G	B	K	H	D	M	T	G	B	K	H	D	M	T	Votes
2008	Hawthorn	37	0	—	—	—	—	—	—	—	—	—	—	—	—	—	—	0
2009	Hawthorn	37	13	1	0	116	116	232	86	22	0.1	0.0	8.9	8.9	17.8	6.6	1.7	0
2010	Hawthorn	37	16	9	11	130	72	202	80	32	0.6	0.7	8.1	4.5	12.6	5.0	2.0	0
2011	Hawthorn	37	21	16	10	230	103	333	124	55	0.8	0.5	11	4.9	15.9	5.9	2.6	0
2012	Hawthorn	37	22	9	9	293	144	437	135	57	0.4	0.4	13.3	6.5	19.9	6.1	2.6	2
2013	Hawthorn	11	12	3	1	112	67	181	67	26	0.3	0.1	9.3	5.6	15.1	5.3	2.2	0
2014	Hawthorn	11	0	—	—	—	—	—	—	—	—	—	—	—	—	—	—	0
2015	Hawthorn	11	4	0	0	23	21	44	19	5	0.0	0.0	5.8	5.3	11.0	4.8	1.3	0
2016	Hawthorn	11	9	2	1	73	83	156	58	19	0.2	0.1	8.1	9.2	17.3	6.4	2.1	0
2017	Hawthorn	11	8	2	3	60	48	108	40	20	0.3	0.4	7.5	6.0	13.5	5.0	2.5	0
2018	Hawthorn	11	6	3	4	48	32	80	27	18	0.5	0.7	8.0	5.3	13.3	4.5	3.0	0
Career			111	45	39	1085	688	1773	636	255	0.4	0.4	9.8	6.2	16.0	5.7	2.3	2

== Honours and achievements ==
Team

- 2× Minor premiership (Hawthorn): 2012, 2013
- VFL premiership player (Box Hill): 2018
- Minor premiership (Box Hill): 2015

Individual

- Hawthorn most improved player: 2009
- Box Hill All-Star team (1999–2019)
- Hawthorn life member
