= 2023 Hawthorn Football Club season =

Hawthorn Football Club
2023 season
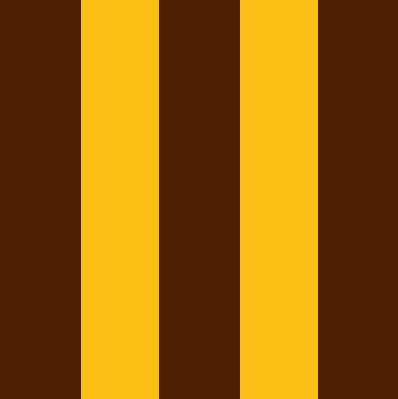
- President: Jeff Kennett (until 13 December 2022); Andrew Gowers (from 13 December 2022)
- Coach: Sam Mitchell
- Captain: James Sicily
- Home grounds: Melbourne Cricket Ground; University of Tasmania Stadium
- Record: 7–16 (16th)
- Best and Fairest: Will Day
- Leading goalkicker: Luke Breust (47)

The 2023 Hawthorn Football Club season was the club's 99th season in the Australian Football League and 122nd overall, the 24th season playing home games at the Melbourne Cricket Ground, the 23rd season playing home games at the University of Tasmania Stadium and the 2nd season under head coach Sam Mitchell, and the 1st season with James Sicily as captain.

== Club summary ==
The 2023 AFL season was the 127th season of the VFL/AFL competition since its inception in 1897; having entered the competition in 1925, it was the 99th season contested by the Hawthorn Football Club. Tasmania, iiNet, and Nissan are expected to continue as the club's three major sponsors, as they had done since 2006, 2013, and 2019 respectively, while ISC will replace Adidas as the clubs manufacturer of its on-and-off field apparel. Hawthorn will continue its alignment with the Box Hill Hawks Football Club in the Victorian Football League, allowing Hawthorn-listed players to play with the Box Hill Hawks when not selected in AFL matches.

== Playing list changes ==
=== Trades ===
11 October 2022	To Hawthorn Pick 48, 2022 AFL draft 3rd-round pick, 2023 AFL draft	To Brisbane Lions Jack Gunston
12 October 2022	To Hawthorn Cooper Stephens; Pick 41, 2022 AFL draft Pick 50, 2022 AFL draft	
12 October 2022	To Collingwood Tom Mitchell; Pick 25, 2022 AFL draft	To Geelong Oliver Henry
12 October 2022	To Hawthorn Lloyd Meek; 2nd-round pick, 2023 AFL draft	To Fremantle Jaeger O'Meara; 4th-round pick, 2023 AFL draft
28 November 2022	To Hawthorn Pick 36, 2022 AFL draft 3rd-round pick, 2023 AFL draft (via Western Bulldogs)	To Brisbane Lions Pick 41, 2022 AFL draft Pick 50, 2022 AFL draft Pick 52, 2022 AFL draft Pick 63, 2022 AFL draft
28 November 2022	To Hawthorn Pick 18, 2022 AFL draft	To Sydney Pick 27, 2022 AFL draft 2nd-round pick, 2023 AFL draft 3rd-round pick, 2023 AFL draft

=== Free agency ===
==== Additions ====
Date	Player	F/A Type	Old club	Deal	Ref
29 September 2022	Karl Amon	Unrestricted	Port Adelaide	Signed a four–year deal	
3 November 2022	Fergus Greene	Delisted	Box Hill	Signed a one–year deal	
30 November 2022	Josh Bennetts	Catergry B rookie	Eastern Ranges		

=== Draft ===
==== AFL draft ====
Round	Overall pick	Player	Recruited from	ref
1	7	Cameron Mackenzie	Sandringham Dragons	
1	18	Josh Weddle	Oakleigh Chargers	
2	37	Henry Hustwaite	Dandenong Stingrays	
3	46	Jack O'Sullivan	Oakleigh Chargers	
3	51	Bailey Macdonald	Oakleigh Chargers	

==== Rookie draft ====
Round	Overall pick	Player	Recruited from	ref
1	6	Seamus Mitchell	Hawthorn	

=== Retirements and delistings ===
Date	Player	Reason	Ref
10 August 2022	Ben McEvoy	Retired	
1 September 2022	Liam Shiels	Retired	
2 September 2022	Jackson Callow	Delisted	
2 September 2022	Connor Downie	Delisted	
2 September 2022	Daniel Howe	Delisted	
2 September 2022	Tom Phillips	Delisted	
7 September 2022	Kyle Hartigan	Delisted	
15 October 2022	Jack Saunders	Delisted	

== 2023 player squad ==
2023 Hawthorn Football Club squad
Senior list		Rookie list	Coaching staff
1 Harry Morrison; 2 Mitchell Lewis; 4 Jarman Impey; 5 James Worpel; 6 James Sicily (C); 7 Ned Reeves; 8 Sam Frost; 9 Changkuoth Jiath; 10 Karl Amon; 11 Conor Nash; 12 Will Day; 13 Dylan Moore (VC); 14 Jack Scrimshaw; 15 Blake Hardwick; 16 Lachlan Bramble; 17 Lloyd Meek; 18 Max Lynch (ret); 20 Chad Wingard	21 Cooper Stephens; 22 Luke Breust (VC); 23 Jacob Koschitzke; 24 Denver Grainger-Barras; 25 Josh Ward; 26 Fergus Greene; 28 Cameron Mackenzie; 29 Jai Serong; 30 Sam Butler; 31 Connor MacDonald; 32 Finn Maginness; 33 Tyler Brockman; 35 Josh Morris; 37 Josh Weddle; 39 Emerson Jeka; 42 Bailey Macdonald; 43 Jack O'Sullivan; 44 Henry Hustwaite	3 Jai Newcombe; 27 Ned Long; 34 Fionn O'Hara (B); 36 James Blanck; 38 Max Ramsden; 40 Seamus Mitchell; 41 Josh Bennetts (B); 45 Clay Tucker; 46 Brandon Ryan	Head coach: Sam Mitchell; Assistant coaches: Andrew Collins (head of development); David Hale (midfield); Adrian Hickmott (contest); Chris Newman (forwards); Kade Simpson (defenders); Legend: (c) Captain(s); (vc) Vice-captain(s); Injured; Upgraded rookie(s); (ret) Retired; (B) Category B rookie; (FA) Free agent; Updated: 17 August 2023; Source(s): HFC Website; Coaches

== Season ==
=== Pre–season ===
Rd	Date and local time	Opponent	Scores (Hawthorn's scores indicated in bold)			Venue	Report
Rd	Date and local time	Opponent	Home	Away	Result	Venue	Report
1	Thursday, 23 February (4:00 pm)	Geelong	21.12 (138)	**7.11 (53)**	Lost by 85 points	GMBHA Stadium	
2	Thursday, 2 March (5:10 pm)	Collingwood	**14.16 (100)**	15.16 (106)	Lost by 6 points	University of Tasmania Stadium	Report

=== Home & Away season ===
Rd	Date and local time	Opponent	Scores (Hawthorn's scores indicated in bold)			Venue	Attendance	Record	Report
Rd	Date and local time	Opponent	Home	Away	Result	Venue	Attendance	Record	Report
1	Sunday, 19 March (3:20 pm)	Essendon	**9.11 (65)**	19.10 (124)	Lost by 59 points	Melbourne Cricket Ground	68,691	0–1	Report
2	Sunday, 26 March (1:10 pm)	Sydney	17.16 (118)	**4.13 (37)**	Lost by 81 points	Sydney Cricket Ground	37,052	0–2	Report
3	Saturday, 1 April (1:45 pm)	North Melbourne	**11.14 (80)**	9.7 (61)	Won by 19 points	University of Tasmania Stadium	11,007	1–2	Report
4	Monday, 10 April (3:20 pm)	Geelong	19.13 (127)	**6.9 (45)**	Lost by 82 points	Melbourne Cricket Ground	65,335	1–3	Report
5	Sunday, 16 April (3:20 pm)	Greater Western Sydney	10.17 (77)	**11.9 (75)**	Lost by 2 points	Norwood Oval	9,057	1–4	Report
6	Sunday, 23 April (1:10 pm)	Adelaide	**11.10 (76)**	11.13 (79)	Lost by 3 points	University of Tasmania Stadium	10,119	1–5	Report
7	Saturday, 29 April (4:35 pm)	Western Bulldogs	14.10 (94)	**9.11 (65)**	Lost by 29 points	Marvel Stadium	40,119	1–6	Report
8	Saturday, 6 May (7:30 pm)	Fremantle	18.9 (117)	**7.6 (48)**	Lost by 69 points	Optus Stadium	37,160	1–7	Report
9	Saturday, 13 May (4:35 pm)	Melbourne	**7.7 (49)**	15.13 (103)	Lost by 54 points	Melbourne Cricket Ground	39,818	1–8	Report
10	Sunday, 21 May (1:10 pm)	West Coast	**22.10 (142)**	4.2 (26)	Won by 116 points	University of Tasmania Stadium	9,135	2–8	Report
11	Saturday, 27 May (1:45 pm)	St Kilda	12.6 (78)	**12.16 (88)**	Won by 10 points	Marvel Stadium	32,022	3–8	Report
12	Saturday, 3 June (1:45 pm)	Port Adelaide	23.13 (151)	**14.12 (96)**	Lost by 55 points	Adelaide Oval	34,234	3–9	Report
13	Saturday, 10 June (1:45 pm)	Brisbane Lions	**15.8 (98)**	11.7 (73)	Won by 25 points	Melbourne Cricket Ground	35,869	4–9	Report
14	Bye								
15	Sunday, 25 June (4:40 pm)	Gold Coast	14.17 (101)	**5.4 (34)**	Lost by 67 points	Metricon Stadium	14,242	4–10	Report
16	Sunday, 2 July (1:10 pm)	Carlton	**7.10 (52)**	17.10 (112)	Lost by 60 points	Melbourne Cricket Ground	66,337	4–11	Report
17	Saturday, 8 July (4:35 pm)	Greater Western Sydney	12.13 (85)	**10.12 (72)**	Lost by 13 points	GIANTS Stadium	9,007	4–12	Report
18	Sunday, 16 July (1:10 pm)	North Melbourne	6.4 (40)	**12.16 (88)**	Won by 48 points	Marvel Stadium	30,201	5–12	Report
19	Saturday, 22 July (1:45 pm)	Richmond	14.12 (96)	**15.5 (95)**	Lost by 1 point	Melbourne Cricket Ground	57,654	5–13	Report
20	Sunday, 30 July (1:10 pm)	St Kilda	**14.9 (93)**	19.8 (122)	Lost by 29 points	Marvel Stadium	22,769	5–14	Report
21	Saturday, 5 August (4:35pm)	Collingwood	**16.9 (105)**	11.7 (73)	Won by 32 points	Melbourne Cricket Ground	62,134	6–14	Report
22	Sunday, 13 August (1:10 pm)	Western Bulldogs	**9.13 (67)**	9.10 (64)	Won by 3 points	University of Tasmania Stadium	12,480	7–14	Report
23	Sunday, 20 August (3:20 pm)	Melbourne	13.9 (87)	**9.6 (60)**	Lost by 27 points	Melbourne Cricket Ground	50,142	7–15	Report
24	Saturday, 26 August (1:45 pm)	Fremantle	**8.8 (56)**	14.9 (93)	Lost by 37 points	Melbourne Cricket Ground	27,951	7–16	Report

==== Ladder ====
Pos	Team	Pld	W	L	D	PF	PA	PP	Pts	Qualification
1	Collingwood (P)	23	18	5	0	2142	1687	127.0	72	Finals series
2	Brisbane Lions	23	17	6	0	2180	1771	123.1	68	Finals series
3	Port Adelaide	23	17	6	0	2149	1906	112.7	68	Finals series
4	Melbourne	23	16	7	0	2079	1660	125.2	64	Finals series
5	Carlton	23	13	9	1	1922	1697	113.3	54	Finals series
6	St Kilda	23	13	10	0	1775	1647	107.8	52	Finals series
7	Greater Western Sydney	23	13	10	0	2018	1885	107.1	52	Finals series
8	Sydney	23	12	10	1	2050	1863	110.0	50	Finals series
9	Western Bulldogs	23	12	11	0	1919	1766	108.7	48	
10	Adelaide	23	11	12	0	2193	1877	116.8	44	
11	Essendon	23	11	12	0	1838	2050	89.7	44	
12	Geelong	23	10	12	1	2088	1855	112.6	42	
13	Richmond	23	10	12	1	1856	1983	93.6	42	
14	Fremantle	23	10	13	0	1835	1898	96.7	40	
15	Gold Coast	23	9	14	0	1839	2006	91.7	36	
**16**	Hawthorn	**23**	**7**	**16**	**0**	**1686**	**2101**	**80.2**	28	
17	North Melbourne	23	3	20	0	1657	2318	71.5	12	
18	West Coast	23	3	20	0	1418	2674	53.0	12	

Source: afl.com.au
Rules for classification: 1) points; 2) percentage; 3) number of points for
(P) Premiers

==== Results summary ====
Overall								Home						Away					
Pld	W	D	L	PF	PA	%	Pts	W	D	L	PF	PA	%	W	D	L	PF	PA	%
23	7	0	16	1686	2101	80.2	28	5	0	6	883	930	94.9	2	0	10	803	1171	68.6

==== Results by round ====
Round	1	2	3	4	5	6	7	8	9	10	11	12	13	14	15	16	17	18	19	20	21	22	23	24
Ground	H	A	H	A	A	H	A	A	H	H	A	A	H	—	A	H	A	A	A	H	H	H	A	H
Result	L	L	W	L	L	L	L	L	L	W	W	L	W	—	L	L	L	W	L	L	W	W	L	L
Position	18	18	17	18	18	18	17	18	18	16	16	16	16	16	16	16	16	16	16	16	16	16	16	16

Source: AFL schedule
A = Away; H = Home; W = Win; D = Draw; L = Loss

== Statistics ==
As of the end of season

No.	Player	GM	GL	BH	DI	KI	HB	MK	TK	HO	RB	IF	CL	CP	UP	CM	MI	1%	GA	FF	FA
1	Harry Morrison	13	2	2	241	163	78	69	36	0	30	33	12	64	172	0	3	9	4	5	7
2	Mitchell Lewis	15	36	20	192	125	67	85	25	5	0	30	2	70	119	19	40	26	10	9	12
3	Jai Newcombe	22	12	8	553	244	309	100	94	0	31	97	122	249	320	8	6	23	14	37	30
4	Jarman Impey	22	3	4	461	299	162	120	48	0	62	50	12	106	346	6	0	33	4	18	13
5	James Worpel	23	10	9	600	286	314	52	92	0	25	118	149	285	333	2	6	19	8	22	39
6	James Sicily	19	2	4	501	324	177	189	29	0	115	34	11	154	301	35	0	88	5	21	20
7	Ned Reeves	21	2	2	170	70	100	31	57	592	8	19	51	113	62	9	3	54	0	17	25
8	Sam Frost	18	0	1	230	116	114	75	36	11	39	8	6	96	136	13	3	71	0	5	23
9	Changkuoth Jiath	8	1	0	136	77	59	28	10	0	22	14	5	40	93	2	0	30	2	6	11
10	Karl Amon	21	9	2	486	326	160	113	37	0	75	87	24	78	399	2	4	23	13	9	9
11	Conor Nash	23	1	5	552	213	339	60	110	1	33	76	109	212	347	1	1	32	11	19	27
12	Will Day	21	6	6	537	262	275	122	73	0	39	92	89	197	335	9	8	34	8	23	19
13	Dylan Moore	23	17	19	480	254	226	480	107	0	19	78	31	163	328	4	13	27	15	32	9
14	Jack Scrimshaw	16	4	1	276	157	119	85	26	0	45	16	5	77	189	11	3	50	1	7	12
15	Blake Hardwick	23	2	1	467	314	153	147	45	0	126	25	10	112	284	11	5	76	1	8	9
16	Lachlan Bramble	11	1	3	182	120	62	46	14	0	27	23	8	39	129	2	0	9	3	3	2
17	Lloyd Meek	16	3	2	154	46	108	36	58	288	17	12	34	96	70	12	3	41	0	14	22
18	Max Lynch	1	0	0	2	0	2	0	1	9	0	1	2	1	1	0	0	3	0	0	0
20	Chad Wingard	14	9	8	198	116	82	59	25	0	6	35	13	59	138	1	11	9	13	12	6
21	Cooper Stephens	0	0	0	0	0	0	0	0	0	0	0	0	0	0	0	0	0	0	0	0
22	Luke Breust	21	47	23	225	144	81	77	44	0	2	37	12	102	131	12	46	15	6	20	19
23	Jacob Koschitzke	12	9	10	103	56	47	39	27	27	2	9	4	60	45	17	22	13	3	14	2
24	Denver Grainger-Barras	7	4	1	39	25	14	19	3	0	3	9	0	15	23	3	4	11	0	5	7
25	Josh Ward	16	2	3	332	181	151	76	31	0	31	31	32	85	252	1	2	9	6	10	8
26	Fergus Greene	11	15	10	89	56	33	38	10	0	0	15	2	32	59	2	23	18	9	6	7
27	Ned Long	4	1	1	34	14	20	6	16	1	2	5	2	12	23	0	1	2	2	1	2
28	Cameron Mackenzie	14	3	6	186	86	100	26	37	0	6	35	21	68	127	1	3	4	9	3	10
29	Jai Serong	2	0	0	21	15	6	8	2	0	2	1	0	5	17	0	0	8	0	1	0
30	Sam Butler	8	6	2	83	34	49	22	18	0	2	10	2	35	52	1	0	3	5	6	3
31	Connor MacDonald	21	12	15	363	209	154	84	54	0	14	54	16	112	258	2	9	11	8	13	6
32	Finn Maginness	13	1	2	134	65	69	41	26	0	12	15	4	34	101	0	3	4	2	3	4
33	Tyler Brockman	15	13	8	167	79	88	50	34	0	4	29	2	53	112	1	20	16	10	5	6
34	Fionn O'Hara	0	0	0	0	0	0	0	0	0	0	0	0	0	0	0	0	0	0	0	0
35	Josh Morris	0	0	0	0	0	0	0	0	0	0	0	0	0	0	0	0	0	0	0	0
36	James Blanck	15	0	0	89	50	39	29	23	0	16	2	2	45	49	8	0	0	0	9	17
37	Josh Weddle	17	4	0	294	135	159	87	23	0	38	36	8	80	210	7	1	42	2	5	3
38	Max Ramsden	2	0	1	14	5	9	5	0	0	1	2	0	7	8	1	2	2	0	1	1
39	Emerson Jeka	0	0	0	0	0	0	0	0	0	0	0	0	0	0	0	0	0	0	0	0
40	Seamus Mitchell	14	0	1	233	131	102	66	25	0	33	20	1	54	170	2	0	22	3	6	7
41	Josh Bennetts	0	0	0	0	0	0	0	0	0	0	0	0	0	0	0	0	0	0	0	0
42	Bailey Macdonald	2	0	0	25	13	12	11	2	0	7	1	1	4	21	1	0	0	0	1	0
43	Jack O'Sullivan	0	0	0	0	0	0	0	0	0	0	0	0	0	0	0	0	0	0	0	0
44	Henry Hustwaite	2	2	0	28	10	18	5	8	0	1	0	3	11	17	1	1	2	0	3	1
45	Clay Tucker	0	0	0	0	0	0	0	0	0	0	0	0	0	0	0	0	0	0	0	0
46	Brandon Ryan	3	4	1	18	15	3	10	3	0	0	4	0	5	13	2	4	0	0	1	1

Source: AFL tables

== Awards, records and milestones ==
=== Awards ===
==== AFL awards ====
- All-Australian team – James Sicily

==== Club awards ====
- Peter Crimmins Medal – Will Day
  - Runner-up – Jai Newcombe
  - Third place – Conor Nash
- Lethal award – Will Day
- Best clubman – Luke Breust
- Most courageous – Dylan Moore
- Most improved – Conor Nash
- Most promising – Josh Weddle

=== Records ===
==== Club records ====
- Most goal assists: Luke Breust – 230

=== Milestones ===
==== Round 1 ====
- Cameron Mackenzie – AFL debut.
- Karl Amon – Hawthorn debut, 1st goal for Hawthorn.
- Fergus Greene – Hawthorn debut, 1st goal for Hawthorn.
- Lloyd Meek – Hawthorn debut.

==== Round 2 ====
- Lloyd Meek – 1st goal for Hawthorn.

==== Round 5 ====
- Seamus Mitchell – AFL debut.
- Ned Long – 1st AFL goal.

==== Round 7 ====
- Max Ramsden – AFL debut.
- Josh Weddle – AFL debut.

==== Round 9 ====
- Sam Frost – 150th AFL game.
- Cameron Mackenzie – 1st AFL goal.
- Josh Weddle – 1st AFL goal.

==== Round 12 ====
- Luke Breust – 500th AFL goal.
- Mitchell Lewis – 100th AFL goal.
- Bailey Macdonald – AFL debut.

==== Round 13 ====
- Jacob Koschitzke – 50th AFL goal.

==== Round 17 ====
- Denver Grainger-Barras – 1st AFL goal.

==== Round 20 ====
- Chad Wingard – 300th AFL goal.
- Will Day – 50th AFL game.
- Brandon Ryan – AFL debut, 1st AFL goal.

==== Round 22 ====
- James Worpel – 100th AFL game.
- Jai Newcombe – 50th AFL game.

==== Round 23 ====
- Henry Hustwaite – AFL debut, 1st AFL goal.

== VFL ==
Hawthorn continued its reserves affiliation with the Box Hill Hawks in the Victorian Football League (VFL) in 2023 for the 24th season. This allowed Hawthorn-listed players to play with Box Hill when not selected in AFL matches.

=== 2023 player squad ===
2023 Box Hill Hawks squad
List		Coaching staff
50 Damian Mascitt; 52 Ben Cavarra; 53 Hugh Beasley (C); 54 Joel Trudgeon; 55 Callum Porter (C); 56 Kai Windsor; 57 Jaylon Thorpe; 58 Liam Serong; 59 Jed Rule; 60 Ed Phillips; 61 Max Hall; 62 Stuart Horner (VC); 63 Lachlan Wynd; 64 Tristen Waack; 65 Ethan Stanley; 66 Callum Brown; 67 Darcy Murr; 68 Luis D'Angleo	70 Jake Arundell; 71 Lachlan Bryce; 73 Max Walton; 74 Liam Coghlan; 75 Clay Tucker (D); 76 Will Elliott; 77 Ben De Bolfo; 78 Kye Agosta; 79 Harvey Howe; 80 Mitchell Sruk; 81 Sahaf Ali; 82 Cody Bramble; 83 Harry Lloyd; 84 Tex Marsham; 85 Harry Banfield; 86 Angus Seivers; 87 Kristian Zalac; 88 James Parsons	Head coach: Zane Littlejohn; Assistant coaches: Kristian Height; Cam Howat; Clayton Sturzaker; Damian Mascitti (playing assistant coach); Legend: (c) Captain(s); (vc) Vice-captain(s); Injured; (ret) Retired; (D) Drafted in 2023 AFL mid-season rookie draft; (SSP) Drafted in 2023 AFL supplemental selection period; Updated: 11 June 2024; Source(s):
