= 2021 Hawthorn Football Club season =

97th season in the Australian Football League

Hawthorn Football Club
2021 season
- President: Jeff Kennett
- Coach: Alastair Clarkson
- Captain: Ben McEvoy
- Home ground: Melbourne Cricket Ground; University of Tasmania Stadium
- Record: 7–13–2 (14th)
- Best and Fairest: Tom Mitchell
- Leading goalkicker: Luke Breust (33)

The 2021 Hawthorn Football Club season was the club's 97th season in the Australian Football League and 120th overall, the 22nd season playing home games at the Melbourne Cricket Ground, the 21st season playing home games at the University of Tasmania Stadium, the 17th season under head coach Alastair Clarkson, and the 1st season with Ben McEvoy as captain.

On 6 July 2021, Hawthorn announced that former premiership captain and current assistant coach Sam Mitchell would succeed Clarkson as coach when his contract expired following the 2022 season. However, just a few weeks later the club announced that Clarkson would instead depart at the end of the 2021 season. Clarkson departed the club as the most decorated coach in club history, having coached the most games (home and away, finals, total), wins (home and away, finals, total), and premierships. Following the announcement, Hawthorn finished the season strongly with wins over premiership contenders, Brisbane, and the Western Bulldogs. They also defeated Collingwood, and draw with the two–time defending premiers Richmond.

Hawthorn improved on their 5–12 record from the previous season. Hawthorn finished in 14th place with a 7–13–2 record. For the first and only time under Alastair Clarkson, the club failed to qualify for finals for the third consecutive season. Luke Breust topped the club goalkicking for the third time, finishing the season with 33 goals. Tom Mitchell won his third Peter Crimmins Medal.

== Club summary ==
The 2021 AFL season was the 125th season of the VFL/AFL competition since its inception in 1897; having entered the competition in 1925, it was the 97th season contested by the Hawthorn Football Club. Tasmania, iiNet, and Nissan continued as the club's three major sponsors, as they have done since 2006, 2013, and 2019 respectively, while Adidas continued to manufacture the club's on-and-off field apparel, as they have done since 2013. Hawthorn continued its alignment with the Box Hill Hawks Football Club in the Victorian Football League, allowing Hawthorn-listed players to play with the Box Hill Hawks when not selected in AFL matches.

== Senior personnel ==
- On 23 September 2020, Forwards coach Scott Burns departed the club after three–seasons to join Adelaide as a senior assistant coach.
- On 9 October 2020, Head of matchday strategy and opposition coach, Adem Yze departed Hawthorn after nine–seasons spent in various roles and joined Melbourne as an assistant coach. The club Yze had spent his entire playing career.
- On 17 October 2020, it was announced that Craig McRae would join the club as an assistant coach. McRae was previously an assistant coach with Richmond, and had been a part of the club's 2017, 2019, and 2020 premierships. McRae had also coached Richmond's VFL team to a premiership in 2019 and was named VFL coach of the year for the 2019 season.
- On 29 October 2020, the coaching lineup for the 2021 season was announced with numerous line coach changes due to the ongoing effects of COVID-19. After spending 2020 as the midfield coach, Sam Mitchell moved into a development while also being placed in the role of head coach of the club's VFL affiliate Box Hill Hawks. Chris Newman will take over as backline coach. Craig McRae will be in charge of the forward line filling the vacancy left by Scott Burns. Brendon Bolton will become the midfield coach, after spending the 2020 season as the director of coaching.
- On 16 January 2021, Graham Wright departed the club after 14 years. Two days later it was confirmed that Wright joined Collingwood as the general manager of football. Rob McCartney was announced as the new Head of Football on 10 February 2021.
- On 29 January 2021, Ben McEvoy was appointed the 45th captain of Hawthorn since joining the VFA in 1914 and 37th since joining the VFL in 1925. Jaeger O'Meara remains in his role of vice-captain which he has held since 2020. Tom Mitchell, Jack Gunston, Liam Shiels remained a part of the leadership group alongside new addition James Worpel.

== Playing list changes ==
=== Trades ===
5 October 2020	To Hawthorn Kyle Hartigan	To Adelaide 4th round pick, 2021 AFL draft
12 October 2020	To Hawthorn Tom Phillips	To Collingwood Pick 65, 2020 AFL draft
9 December 2020	To Hawthorn Pick 66, 2020 AFL draft Pick 69, 2020 AFL draft 2nd round pick, 2021 AFL draft	To Collingwood Pick 41, 2020 AFL draft Pick 42, 2020 AFL draft
9 December 2020	To Hawthorn Pick 54, 2020 AFL draft 4th round pick, 2020 AFL draft (via Richmond)	To St Kilda Pick 43, 2020 AFL draft
9 December 2020	To Hawthorn Pick 46, 2020 AFL draft 4th round pick, 2020 AFL draft (via Richmond)	To Melbourne 3rd round pick, 2021 AFL draft

=== Free agency ===
Date	Player	F/A Type	Old Club	Deal	Compensation	Ref
5 March 2021	Lachlan Bramble	SSP	Box Hill	Signed a 1–year rookie deal	—N/a	

==== Departures ====
Date	Player	F/A Type	New Club	Deal	Compensation	Ref
30 October 2020	Isaac Smith	Unrestricted	Geelong	Signed a 2–year deal	End of 3rd-round pick	

=== Draft ===
==== AFL draft ====
Round	Overall pick	Player	Recruited from	ref
1	6	Denver Grainger-Barras	Swan Districts	
2	29	Seamus Mitchell	Bendigo Pioneers	
2	35	Connor Downie	Eastern Rangers	
3	46	Tyler Brockman	Subiaco	

==== Rookie draft ====
Round	Overall pick	Player	Recruited from	ref
1	4	Jack Saunders	Norwood	

==== Mid-season rookie draft ====
The Mid-season draft will take place during Hawthorns bye week. Hawthorn will have two selections due to Jonathon Pattons retirement and James Sicily being placed on the long-term injury list.

Round	Overall pick	Player	Recruited from	ref
1	2	Jai Newcombe	Box Hill	
2	17	Jackson Callow	Norwood	

=== Retirements and delistings ===
Date	Player	2021 team	Reason	Ref
14 September 2020	Paul Puopolo	—N/a	Retired	
14 September 2020	Ben Stratton	—N/a	Retired	
23 September 2020	Conor Glass	—N/a	Retired	
23 September 2020	Ricky Henderson	—N/a	Retired	
7 October 2020	Will Golds	—N/a	Delisted	
7 October 2020	Darren Minchington	—N/a	Delisted	
7 October 2020	Jackson Ross	—N/a	Delisted	
8 October 2020	James Frawley	St Kilda	Delisted	
25 November 2020	Harry Jones	—N/a	Delisted	
25 November 2020	Mathew Walker	—N/a	Delisted	

== 2021 player squad ==
2021 Hawthorn Football Club squad
Senior list		Rookie list	Coaching staff
1 Harry Morrison; 2 Mitchell Lewis; 3 Tom Mitchell; 4 Jarman Impey; 5 James Worpel; 6 James Sicily; 7 Ben McEvoy (C); 8 Sam Frost; 9 Shaun Burgoyne; 10 Jaeger O'Meara (VC); 11 Conor Nash; 12 Will Day; 13 Oliver Hanrahan; 14 Jack Scrimshaw; 15 Blake Hardwick; 17 Daniel Howe; 18 Jonathon Ceglar; 19 Jack Gunston	20 Chad Wingard; 21 Tom Phillips; 22 Luke Breust; 23 Tim O'Brien; 24 James Cousins; 25 Jonathon Patton (ret); 26 Liam Shiels; 27 Michael Hartley; 28 Kyle Hartigan; 29 Changkuoth Jiath; 32 Finn Maginness; 34 Jacob Koschitzke; 35 Josh Morris; 38 Denver Grainger-Barras; 40 Seamus Mitchell; 41 Connor Downie; 42 Tyler Brockman; Tom Scully (ret)	16 Lachlan Bramble; 30 Damon Greaves; 31 Keegan Brooksby; 33 Harry Pepper (B); 36 Dylan Moore; 37 Ned Reeves; 39 Emerson Jeka; 43 Jack Saunders; 44 Jai Newcombe; 45 Jackson Callow	Head coach: Alastair Clarkson; Assistant coaches: Brendon Bolton (midfield); Craig McRae (forwards); Sam Mitchell (VFL coach); Damian Monkhorst (ruck); Chris Newman (backline); Legend: (c) Captain(s); (vc) Vice-captain(s); Injured; Upgraded rookie(s); (ret) Retired; (B) Category B rookie; (FA) Free agent; Updated: 17 August 2021; Source(s): HFC Website; Coaches

== Community series ==
Rd	Date and local time	Opponent	Scores (Hawthorn's scores indicated in bold)			Venue	Report
Rd	Date and local time	Opponent	Home	Away	Result	Venue	Report
1	Saturday, 6 March (4:10 pm)	North Melbourne	12.9 (81)	**17.18 (120)**	Won by 39 points	Arden Street Oval	Report

== Home & Away season ==
Rd	Date and local time	Opponent	Scores (Hawthorn's scores indicated in bold)			Venue	Record	Report
Rd	Date and local time	Opponent	Home	Away	Result	Venue	Record	Report
1	Saturday, 20 March (7:25 pm)	Essendon	13.13 (91)	**14.8 (92)**	Won by 1 point	Marvel Stadium	1–0	Report
2	Sunday, 28 March (1:10 pm)	Richmond	**7.7 (49)**	11.12 (78)	Lost by 29 points	Melbourne Cricket Ground	1–1	Report
3	Monday, April 5 (3:20 pm)	Geelong	10.9 (69)	**9.10 (64)**	Lost by 5 points	Melbourne Cricket Ground	1–2	Report
4	Sunday, 11 April (2:40 pm)	Fremantle	13.18 (96)	**12.9 (81)**	Lost by 15 points	Optus Stadium	1–3	Report
5	Sunday, 18 April (3:20 pm)	Melbourne	**8.6 (54)**	15.14 (104)	Lost by 50 points	Melbourne Cricket Ground	1–4	Report
6	Sunday, 25 April (12:30 pm)	Adelaide	**15.12 (102)**	16.3 (99)	Won by 3 points	University of Tasmania Stadium	2–4	Report
7	Saturday, 1 May (4:35 pm)	St Kilda	19.14 (128)	**9.5 (59)**	Lost by 69 points	Marvel Stadium	2–5	Report
8	Sunday, 9 May (1:10 pm)	West Coast	**8.12 (60)**	14.14 (98)	Lost by 38 points	Melbourne Cricket Ground	2–6	Report
9	Saturday, 15 May (2:10 pm)	North Melbourne	**12.8 (80)**	13.9 (87)	Lost by 7 points	University of Tasmania Stadium	2–7	Report
10	Saturday, 22 May (1:45 pm)	Carlton	13.8 (86)	**9.9 (63)**	Lost by 23 points	Melbourne Cricket Ground	2–8	Report
11	Saturday, 29 May (7:40 pm)	Gold Coast	17.11 (113)	**11.10 (76)**	Lost by 37 points	Sydney Cricket Ground	2–9	Report
12	Bye							
13	Friday, 11 June (7:50 pm)	Sydney	7.9 (51)	**14.5 (89)**	Won by 38 points	Sydney Cricket Ground	3–9	Report
14	Sunday, 20 June (3:20 pm)	Essendon	**10.13 (73)**	13.8 (86)	Lost by 13 points	University of Tasmania Stadium	3–10	Report
15	Sunday, 27 June (1:10 pm)	Greater Western Sydney	11.6 (72)	**13.13 (90)**	Won by 18 points	Melbourne Cricket Ground	4–10	Report
16	Saturday, 3 July (7:40 pm)	Port Adelaide	**7.11 (53)**	13.9 (87)	Lost by 34 points	Marvel Stadium	4–11	Report
17	Saturday, 10 July (1:45 pm)	Fremantle	**6.10 (46)**	16.12 (108)	Lost by 62 points	University of Tasmania Stadium	4–12	Report
18	Saturday, 17 July (7:25 pm)	Melbourne	11.13 (79)	**12.7 (79)**	Draw	Melbourne Cricket Ground	4–12–1	Report
19	Saturday, 31 July (7:40 pm)	Adelaide	16.6 (102)	**13.5 (83)**	Lost by 19 points	Marvel Stadium	4–13–1	Report
20	Sunday, 1 August (2:10 pm)	Brisbane Lions	**14.8 (92)**	12.8 (80)	Won by 12 points	University of Tasmania Stadium	5–13–1	Report
21	Sunday, 8 August (2:10 pm)	Collingwood	**15.7 (97)**	12.6 (78)	Won by 19 points	Melbourne Cricket Ground	6–13–1	Report
22	Saturday, 14 August (1:45 pm)	Western Bulldogs	**9.10 (64)**	5.7 (37)	Won by 27 points	University of Tasmania Stadium	7–13–1	Report
23	Saturday, 21 August (1:35 pm)	Richmond	12.11 (83)	**12.11 (83)**	Draw	Melbourne Cricket Ground	7–13–2	Report

=== Ladder ===
Pos	Team	Pld	W	L	D	PF	PA	PP	Pts	Qualification
1	Melbourne (P)	22	17	4	1	1888	1443	130.8	70	Finals series
2	Port Adelaide	22	17	5	0	1884	1492	126.3	68	Finals series
3	Geelong	22	16	6	0	1845	1456	126.7	64	Finals series
4	Brisbane Lions	22	15	7	0	2131	1599	133.3	60	Finals series
5	Western Bulldogs	22	15	7	0	1994	1501	132.8	60	Finals series
6	Sydney	22	15	7	0	1986	1656	119.9	60	Finals series
7	Greater Western Sydney	22	11	10	1	1768	1773	99.7	46	Finals series
8	Essendon	22	11	11	0	1953	1790	109.1	44	Finals series
9	West Coast	22	10	12	0	1752	1880	93.2	40	
10	St Kilda	22	10	12	0	1644	1796	91.5	40	
11	Fremantle	22	10	12	0	1578	1825	86.5	40	
12	Richmond	22	9	12	1	1743	1780	97.9	38	
13	Carlton	22	8	14	0	1746	1972	88.5	32	
**14**	Hawthorn	**22**	**7**	**13**	**2**	**1629**	**1912**	**85.2**	32	
15	Adelaide	22	7	15	0	1616	1971	82.0	28	
16	Gold Coast	22	7	15	0	1430	1863	76.8	28	
17	Collingwood	22	6	16	0	1557	1818	85.6	24	
18	North Melbourne	22	4	17	1	1458	2075	70.3	18	

Updated to match(es) played on 21 August 2021. Source: AFL
Rules for classification: 1) points; 2) percentage; 3) number of points for.
(P) Premiers

== Statistics ==
No.	Name	GM (S)	G	B	D	K	H	M	T	HO	FF	FA
1	Harry Morrison	15_{(1)}	7	2	231	124	107	67	34	0	7	14
2	Mitchell Lewis	14	22	9	142	91	51	67	28	29	13	10
3	Tom Mitchell	22	8	5	754	321	433	98	105	0	24	29
4	Jarman Impey	13	2	0	288	181	107	70	33	0	16	4
5	James Worpel	20	10	8	426	232	194	54	82	0	15	27
6	James Sicily	0	0	0	0	0	0	0	0	0	0	0
7	Ben McEvoy (c)	22	12	8	275	135	140	111	78	370	28	14
8	Sam Frost	22	0	0	333	194	139	112	44	3	7	31
9	Shaun Burgoyne	18_{(3)}	1	1	217	133	84	46	31	0	5	5
10	Jaeger O'Meara	18	5	9	473	232	241	74	91	0	16	31
11	Conor Nash	8(1)	2	1	110	51	59	26	23	0	3	10
12	Will Day	5	0	0	99	55	44	25	8	0	5	7
13	Oliver Hanrahan	13_{(2)}	8	6	141	71	70	31	13	0	7	4
14	Jack Scrimshaw	20_{(1)}	4	2	412	249	163	127	29	0	8	3
15	Blake Hardwick	20	0	2	418	312	106	108	41	0	22	10
16	Lachlan Bramble	10	1	3	183	119	64	44	20	0	7	3
17	Daniel Howe	20_{(1)}	8	5	373	249	124	109	40	0	18	17
18	Jonathon Ceglar	12	2	2	180	67	113	53	26	249	10	16
19	Jack Gunston	1	0	0	7	6	1	1	2	0	0	0
20	Chad Wingard	16	12	11	357	199	158	58	61	0	19	8
21	Tom Phillips	22	13	5	406	241	165	93	47	0	23	6
22	Luke Breust	19	33	11	238	121	117	47	62	0	12	13
23	Tim O'Brien	19_{(1)}	12	5	219	147	72	90	32	12	18	16
24	James Cousins	10_{(1)}	2	5	187	101	86	27	37	0	8	6
26	Liam Shiels	21	5	4	444	244	200	93	99	0	16	31
27	Michael Hartley	3	1	1	56	39	17	14	5	0	1	3
28	Kyle Hartigan	19	0	0	201	106	95	66	16	2	15	28
29	Changkuoth Jiath	16	0	2	324	172	152	93	26	0	18	22
30	Damon Greaves	7_{(2)}	1	0	74	48	26	16	12	0	6	2
31	Keegan Brooksby	0	0	0	0	0	0	0	0	0	0	0
32	Finn Maginness	2_{(1)}	0	0	15	5	10	1	5	0	1	1
33	Harry Pepper	0	0	0	0	0	0	0	0	0	0	0
34	Jacob Koschitzke	20	27	19	163	98	65	77	37	1	13	7
35	Josh Morris	5_{(4)}	0	1	6	4	2	1	5	0	3	0
36	Dylan Moore	20	27	11	307	160	147	76	58	0	27	9
37	Ned Reeves	5	1	0	48	19	29	8	20	131	5	5
38	Denver Grainger-Barras	5	0	0	37	25	12	17	11	0	3	2
39	Emerson Jeka	4	2	2	26	13	13	7	4	0	1	0
40	Seamus Mitchell	0	0	0	0	0	0	0	0	0	0	0
41	Connor Downie	2_{(1)}	0	0	12	6	6	2	0	0	0	0
42	Tyler Brockman	11_{(1)}	10	4	98	52	46	27	23	0	2	6
43	Jack Saunders	0	0	0	0	0	0	0	0	0	0	0
44	Jai Newcombe	7_{(2)}	1	1	62	32	30	17	39	0	4	8
45	Jackson Callow	0	0	0	0	0	0	0	0	0	0	0

== Awards, records and milestones ==
=== Awards ===
AFL awards

- 22 Under 22 team: Changkuoth Jiath

Club awards

- Peter Crimmins Medal: Tom Mitchell
- Best clubman: Ben McEvoy
- Most consistent player: Sam Frost
- Most promising player: Changkuoth Jiath
- Best first year player (debut season): Jacob Koschitzke

=== Club records ===
- Most tackles: 1,387 – Liam Shiels
- Most goal assists: 209 – Luke Breust
- Most score involvements: 1,474 – Luke Breust
- Most games coached: 390 – Alastair Clarkson
- Most victories coached: 228 – Alastair Clarkson
- Most home and away games coached: 364 – Alastair Clarkson
- Most home and away victories coached: 212 – Alastair Clarkson
- Most uncontested disposals in a season: 504 – Tom Mitchell

=== Milestones ===
Round 1

- Tyler Brockman – AFL debut.
- Connor Downie – AFL debut.
- Kyle Hartigan – Hawthorn debut.
- Jacob Koschitzke – AFL debut.
- Tom Phillips – Hawthorn debut.
- Tyler Brockman – 1st AFL goal.
- Tom Phillips – 1st goal for Hawthorn.

Round 2

- James Worpel – 50th AFL game.
- Jacob Koschitzke – 1st AFL goal.

Round 4

- Jarman Impey – 50th game for Hawthorn.
- Michael Hartley – 1st goal for Hawthorn.

Round 6

- Jack Scrimshaw – 1st AFL goal.

Round 7

- Emerson Jeka – AFL debut.

Round 8

- Alastair Clarkson – 350th Home and Away game coached.
- Harry Morrison – 50th AFL game.

Round 10

- Ned Reeves – AFL debut.

Round 11

- Tom Phillips – 100th AFL game.
- Damon Greaves – 1st AFL goal.
- Ned Reeves – 1st AFL goal.

Round 13

- Tom Phillips – 50th AFL goal.
- Jai Newcombe – AFL debut.

Round 14

- Lachlan Bramble – AFL debut.

Round 15

- Denver Grainger-Barras – AFL debut.
- Jai Newcombe – 1st AFL goal.

Round 16

- Shaun Burgoyne – 400th AFL game.

Round 17

- Emerson Jeka – 1st AFL goal.

Round 20

- Ben McEvoy – 150th game for Hawthorn.

Round 21

- Blake Hardwick – 100th AFL game.

Round 22

- Jonathon Ceglar – 100th AFL game.
- Ben McEvoy – 100th AFL goal.
- Lachlan Bramble – 1st AFL goal.

Round 23

- Shaun Burgoyne – 250th game for Hawthorn.
- Tom Mitchell – 150th AFL game.
