= 2022 Hawthorn Football Club season =

98th season in the Australian Football League

Hawthorn Football Club
2022 season
- President: Jeff Kennett
- Coach: Sam Mitchell
- Captain: Ben McEvoy
- Home ground: Melbourne Cricket Ground; University of Tasmania Stadium
- Record: 8–14 (13th)
- Best and Fairest: James Sicily
- Leading goalkicker: Luke Breust (40)

The 2022 Hawthorn Football Club season was the club's 98th season in the Australian Football League and 121st overall, the 23rd season playing home games at the Melbourne Cricket Ground, the 22nd season playing home games at the University of Tasmania Stadium, the 1st season under head coach Sam Mitchell, and the 2nd and final season with Ben McEvoy as captain. This was the first season without Alastair Clarkson as coach since 2004. Hawthorn finished in thirteenth place with a 8–14 improving on their record from the season before. Luke Breust led the club goalkicking for the fourth time finishing the season with 40 goals.

== Club summary ==
The 2022 AFL season was the 126th season of the VFL/AFL competition since its inception in 1897; having entered the competition in 1925, it was the 98th season contested by the Hawthorn Football Club. Tasmania, iiNet, and Nissan continued as the club's three major sponsors, as they had done since 2006, 2013, and 2019 respectively, while Adidas will continue to manufacture the club's on-and-off field apparel, as they have done since 2013. Hawthorn will continue its alignment with the Box Hill Hawks Football Club in the Victorian Football League, allowing Hawthorn-listed players to play with the Box Hill Hawks when not selected in AFL matches.

== Season summary ==
26 August 2021 – Adrian Hickmott joins the club as an assistant coach. Hickmott had previously spent 10 years with West Coast serving a number of roles most recently being the midfield coach, alongside Mitchell the pair helped lead West Coast to the 2018 AFL premiership. While Chris Newman re-signed with the club until the end of the 2023 season.

1 September 2021 – Craig McRae departs the club after 1 season having been appointed as the next senior coach of Collingwood.

8 September 2021 – Lachlan Bramble signs a two-year deal to remain at the club until the end of the 2023 season.

9 September 2021 – Dylan Moore signs a two-year deal to remain at the club until the end of the 2023 season. Andrew Collins joins as the new head of development coach. Collins was previously an assistant coach working alongside Mitchell with Box Hill.

13 September 2021 – David Hale joins the club as an assistant coach. Hale had spent the previous 6 seasons as an assistant coach with Fremantle, and was also an interim coach for 1 game in 2019. While Brendon Bolton departed the club to join McRae at Collingwood.

16 September 2021 – Hawthorn announces that they've extended their deal to play at University of Tasmania Stadium until the end of 2022.

23 September 2021 – Robert Harvey joins the club as an assistant coach. Harvey had spent the previous 10 seasons with Collingwood as an assistant, and was the interim coach for 9 games during the 2021 season.

7 October 2021 – Daniel Howe signs a one–year deal to remain at the club until the end of 2022. Finn Maginness signs a two–year deal remaining at the club until the end of 2023.

14 October 2021 – Hawthorn signs a three-year deal to extend their partnership with iiNet until the end of 2024.

20 October 2021 – Jackson Callow and Jack Saunders sign one–year deals to remain at Hawthorn until the end of 2022.

7 February 2022 – Denver Grainger-Barras signs a two–year deal to remain at Hawthorn until the end of 2024.

8 February 2022 – Jack Scrimshaw signs a two–year deal to remain at Hawthorn until the end of 2024.

9 February 2022 – Changkuoth Jiath signs a two–year deal to remain at Hawthorn until the end of 2024.

16 February 2022 – Hawthorn signs a five–year deal to extend their partnership with Nissan until the end of 2027.

15 April 2022 – Ned Long signs a one–year extension to stay at Hawthorn until 2023.

17 May 2022 – James Sicily signs a five–year deal to remain at Hawthorn until the end of 2027.

21 June 2022 – Conor Nash signs a two-year deal to remain at Hawthorn until 2024.

24 June 2022 – Mitchell Lewis signs a four–year deal to remain at Hawthorn until the end of 2026.

== Playing list changes ==
=== Trades ===
13 October 2021	To Hawthorn 3rd round pick, 2022 AFL draft (via Brisbane Lions)	To Geelong Jonathon Ceglar; 4th round pick, 2022 AFL draft
13 October 2021	To Hawthorn Max Lynch; 3rd round pick, 2022 AFL draft (via Fremantle); 4th round pick, 2022 AFL draft (via Gold Coast)	To Collingwood 3rd round pick, 2022 AFL draft (via Brisbane Lions); 3rd round pick, 2022 AFL draft

=== Free agency ===
==== Additions ====
Date	Player	Type	Old club	Deal	Ref
26 October 2021	Fionn O'Hara	Category B-rookie	—N/a	Signed a two–year deal	

==== Departures ====
Date	Player	Type	New club	Deal	Compensation	Ref
7 October 2021	Tim O'Brien	Unrestricted	Western Bulldogs	Signed a two–year deal	None	

=== Draft ===
==== AFL draft ====
Round	Overall pick	Player	Recruited from	ref
1	7	Josh Ward	Northern Knights	
2	23	Sam Butler	Greater Western Victoria Rebels	
2	26	Connor MacDonald	Dandenong Stingrays	
4	53	Jai Serong	Gippsland Power	

==== Rookie draft ====
Round	Overall pick	Player	Recruited from	ref
1	5	Ned Long	Northern Knights	

==== Mid–Season draft ====
Round	Overall pick	Player	Recruited from	ref
1	6	Max Ramsden	Sandringham Dragons	
2	20	James Blanck	Box Hill Hawks	

=== Retirements and delistings ===
Date	Player	Reason	Ref
2 February 2021	Tom Scully	Retired	
16 April 2021	Jonathon Patton	Retired	
19 August 2021	Shaun Burgoyne	Retired	
7 September 2021	Keegan Brooksby	Delisted	
7 September 2021	James Cousins	Delisted	
7 September 2021	Damon Greaves	Delisted	
7 September 2021	Michael Hartley	Delisted	
7 September 2021	Harry Pepper	Delisted	
15 October 2021	Oliver Hanrahan	Delisted	

== 2022 player squad ==
2022 Hawthorn Football Club squad
Senior list		Rookie list	Coaching staff
1 Harry Morrison; 2 Mitchell Lewis; 3 Tom Mitchell; 4 Jarman Impey; 5 James Worpel; 6 James Sicily; 7 Ben McEvoy (C); 8 Sam Frost; 9 Changkuoth Jiath; 10 Jaeger O'Meara (VC); 11 Conor Nash; 12 Will Day; 13 Dylan Moore; 14 Jack Scrimshaw; 15 Blake Hardwick; 17 Daniel Howe; 18 Max Lynch; 19 Jack Gunston	20 Chad Wingard; 21 Tom Phillips; 22 Luke Breust; 23 Jacob Koschitzke; 24 Denver Grainger-Barras; 25 Josh Ward; 26 Liam Shiels; 28 Kyle Hartigan; 29 Jai Serong; 30 Sam Butler; 31 Connor MacDonald; 32 Finn Maginness; 33 Tyler Brockman; 35 Josh Morris; 37 Ned Reeves; 39 Emerson Jeka; 40 Seamus Mitchell; 41 Connor Downie	16 Lachlan Bramble; 27 Ned Long; 34 Fionn O'Hara (B); 36 James Blanck; 38 Max Ramsden; 43 Jack Saunders; 44 Jai Newcombe; 45 Jackson Callow	Head coach: Sam Mitchell; Assistant coaches: Andrew Collins (head of development); David Hale (forward); Robert Harvey (midfield); Adrian Hickmott (contest); Damian Monkhorst (ruck); Chris Newman (backline); Legend: (c) Captain(s); (vc) Vice-captain(s); Injured; Upgraded rookie(s); (ret) Retired; (B) Category B rookie; (FA) Free agent; Updated: 13 July 2022; Source(s): HFC Website; Coaches

== Community series ==
Rd	Date and local time	Opponent	Scores (Hawthorn's scores indicated in bold)			Venue	Report
Rd	Date and local time	Opponent	Home	Away	Result	Venue	Report
1	Friday, 25 February (3:00 pm)	Collingwood	22.9 (141)	**19.27 (141)**	Draw	Morwell Recreation Reserve	Report
2	Sunday, 5 March (1:10 pm)	Richmond	**9.15 (69)**	14.10 (94)	Lost by 25 points	Devonport Oval	Report

== Home & Away season ==
Rd	Date and local time	Opponent	Scores (Hawthorn's scores indicated in bold)			Venue	Attendance	Record	Report
Rd	Date and local time	Opponent	Home	Away	Result	Venue	Attendance	Record	Report
1	Sunday, 20 March (1:10 pm)	North Melbourne	**11.12 (78)**	8.10 (58)	Won by 20 points	Melbourne Cricket Ground	38,297	1–0	Report
2	Saturday, 26 March (7:10 pm)	Port Adelaide	7.14 (56)	**19.6 (120)**	Won by 64 points	Adelaide Oval	30,267	2–0	Report
3	Sunday, 3 April (1:10 pm)	Carlton	11.8 (74)	**11.7 (73)**	Lost by 1 point	Melbourne Cricket Ground	66,317	2–1	Report
4	Sunday, 10 April (3:20 pm)	St Kilda	**10.13 (73)**	22.10 (142)	Lost by 69 points	Melbourne Cricket Ground	30,926	2–2	Report
5	Monday, 18 April (3:20 pm)	Geelong	**14.8 (92)**	11.14 (80)	Won by 12 points	Melbourne Cricket Ground	48,030	3–2	Report
6	Monday, 25 April (12:30 pm)	Sydney	**10.8 (68)**	16.13 (109)	Lost by 41 points	University of Tasmania Stadium	14,107	3–3	Report
7	Saturday, 30 April (4:35 pm)	Melbourne	13.13 (91)	**11.15 (81)**	Lost by 10 points	Melbourne Cricket Ground	39,425	3–4	Report
8	Saturday, 7 May (7:25 pm)	Essendon	16.12 (108)	**11.15 (81)**	Lost by 27 points	Marvel Stadium	33,042	3–5	Report
9	Saturday, 14 May (1:45 pm)	Richmond	**14.10 (94)**	17.15 (117)	Lost by 23 points	Melbourne Cricket Ground	40,663	3–6	Report
10	Sunday, 22 May (3:20 pm)	Brisbane Lions	**18.9 (117)**	17.10 (112)	Won by 5 points	University of Tasmania Stadium	12,007	4–6	Report
11	Saturday, 28 May (7:40 pm)	Gold Coast	18.13 (121)	**7.12 (54)**	Lost by 67 points	TIO Stadium	7,516	4–7	Report
12	Sunday, 5 June (2:10 pm)	Collingwood	**10.8 (68)**	10.12 (72)	Lost by 4 points	Melbourne Cricket Ground	43,939	4–8	Report
13	Saturday, 11 June (2:10 pm)	Fremantle	14.11 (95)	**12.10 (82)**	Lost by 13 points	Optus Stadium	39,428	4–9	Report
14	Bye								
15	Friday, 24 June (7:00 pm)	Western Bulldogs	19.11 (125)	**12.11 (83)**	Lost by 42 points	Marvel Stadium	32,505	4–10	Report
16	Sunday, 3 July (3:20 pm)	Greater Western Sydney	11.6 (72)	**7.8 (50)**	Lost by 22 points	GIANTS Stadium	4,812	4–11	Report
17	Sunday, 10 July (3:20 pm)	Adelaide	**13.8 (86)**	8.6 (54)	Won by 32 points	Marvel Stadium	18,880	5–11	Report
18	Sunday, 17 July (1:10 pm)	West Coast	**15.12 (102)**	12.5 (77)	Won by 25 points	Melbourne Cricket Ground	22,598	6–11	Report
19	Saturday, 23 July (1:45 pm)	North Melbourne	11.9 (75)	**19.7 (121)**	Won by 46 points	Blundstone Arena	9,713	7–11	Report
20	Saturday, 30 July (4:45 pm)	St Kilda	10.15 (75)	**9.9 (63)**	Lost by 12 points	Marvel Stadium	25,348	7–12	Report
21	Saturday, 6 August (1:45 pm)	Gold Coast	**10.10 (70)**	8.15 (63)	Won by 7 points	University of Tasmania Stadium	9,022	8–12	Report
22	Sunday, 14 August (1:10 pm)	Richmond	20.8 (128)	**9.13 (67)**	Lost by 61 points	Melbourne Cricket Ground	59,338	8-13	Report
23	Sunday, 21 August (1:10 pm)	Western Bulldogs	**10.4 (64)**	12.15 (87)	Lost by 23 points	University of Tasmania Stadium	13,105	8–14	Report

=== Ladder ===
Pos	Team	Pld	W	L	D	PF	PA	PP	Pts	Qualification
1	Geelong (P)	22	18	4	0	2146	1488	144.2	72	Finals series
2	Melbourne	22	16	6	0	1936	1483	130.5	64	Finals series
3	Sydney	22	16	6	0	2067	1616	127.9	64	Finals series
4	Collingwood	22	16	6	0	1839	1763	104.3	64	Finals series
5	Fremantle	22	15	6	1	1739	1486	117.0	62	Finals series
6	Brisbane Lions	22	15	7	0	2147	1799	119.3	60	Finals series
7	Richmond	22	13	8	1	2165	1780	121.6	54	Finals series
8	Western Bulldogs	22	12	10	0	1973	1812	108.9	48	Finals series
9	Carlton	22	12	10	0	1857	1714	108.3	48	
10	St Kilda	22	11	11	0	1703	1715	99.3	44	
11	Port Adelaide	22	10	12	0	1806	1638	110.3	40	
12	Gold Coast	22	10	12	0	1871	1820	102.8	40	
**13**	Hawthorn	**22**	**8**	**14**	**0**	**1787**	**1991**	**89.8**	32	
14	Adelaide	22	8	14	0	1721	1986	86.7	32	
15	Essendon	22	7	15	0	1737	2087	83.2	28	
16	Greater Western Sydney	22	6	16	0	1631	1927	84.6	24	
17	West Coast	22	2	20	0	1429	2389	59.8	8	
18	North Melbourne	22	2	20	0	1337	2397	55.8	8	

Source: afl.com.au
Rules for classification: 1) points; 2) percentage; 3) number of points for.
(P) Premiers

== Awards, records and milestones ==
=== Awards ===
==== AFL awards ====
- Jai Newcombe – AFLCA young player of the year

==== Club awards ====
- Peter Crimmins Medal – James Sicily
- Lethal award – Jai Newcombe
- Most improved player – Mitchell Lewis
- Most courageous player – Blake Hardwick
- Most promising player – Ned Reeves
- Best clubman – Dylan Moore

=== Club records ===
- Most tackles: Liam Shiels – 1,426
- Most goal assists: Luke Breust – 224
- Most rebound 50's in a season: 179 – James Sicily
- Most rebound 50's in a single game: 15 – James Sicily (Tied with Luke Hodge, and James Sicily)

=== Milestones ===
Round 1

- Jack Gunston – 400th AFL goal.
- Mitchell Lewis – 50th AFL goal.
- Finn Maginness – 1st AFL goal.
- Connor MacDonald – AFL debut.
- Josh Ward – AFL debut.
- Max Lynch – Hawthorn debut.
- Sam Mitchell – 1st AFL game as coach, 1st AFL win as coach.

Round 2

- Connor MacDonald – 1st AFL goal.
- Josh Ward – 1st AFL goal.

Round 3

- Jack Scrimshaw – 50th AFL game.
- Chad Wingard – 50th game for Hawthorn.

Round 5

- Luke Breust – 450th AFL goal.
- Jack Gunston – 200th game for Hawthorn.

Round 7

- James Sicily – 100th AFL game.
- Jack Scrimshaw – 50th game for Hawthorn.
- Jackson Callow – AFL debut.

Round 8

- Max Lynch – 1st AFL goal.

Round 9

- Chad Wingard – 200th AFL game, 50th goal for Hawthorn.
- Sam Butler – AFL debut.

Round 10

- Sam Butler – 1st AFL goal.
- Sam Frost – 1st goal for Hawthorn.

Round 12

- Luke Breust – 250th AFL game.
- Liam Shiels – 250th AFL game.
- Changkuoth Jiath – 1st AFL goal.

Round 13

- Dylan Moore – 50th AFL goal.
- Sam Frost – 50th game for Hawthorn.

Round 15

- James Blanck – AFL debut.

Round 17

- Tom Mitchell – 100th game for Hawthorn.

Round 19

- Mitchell Lewis – 50th AFL game.

Round 21

- Jack Gunston – 400th goal for Hawthorn.
- Ben McEvoy – 250th AFL game.
- Dylan Moore – 50th AFL game.
- Jai Serong – AFL debut.

Round 22

- Jarman Impey – 150th AFL game.
- Jai Serong – 1st AFL goal.

Round 23

- Conor Nash – 50th AFL game.
- Ned Long – AFL debut.
- Jack Saunders – AFL debut, 1st AFL goal.
