= 2019 Hawthorn Football Club season =

95th season in the Australian Football League

Hawthorn Football Club
2019 season
- President: Jeff Kennett
- Coach: Alastair Clarkson
- Captain: Ben Stratton
- Home grounds: Melbourne Cricket Ground; University of Tasmania Stadium
- Record: 11–11 (9th)
- Finals Series: Did not qualify
- Leading goalkicker: Luke Breust (34)
- Highest home attendance: 66,407 (Round 16 vs. Collingwood)
- Lowest home attendance: 11,637 (Round 10 vs. Port Adelaide)
- Average home attendance: 31,118
- Club membership: 81,211

The 2019 Hawthorn Football Club season was the club's 95th season in the Australian Football League and 118th overall, the 20th season playing home games at the Melbourne Cricket Ground, the 19th season playing home games at the University of Tasmania Stadium, the 15th season under head coach Alastair Clarkson, and the 1st season with Ben Stratton as club captain. A 19-point loss to Sydney in round 14 meant that Hawthorn could not match their 15–7 record from 2018. A 70-point win over Gold Coast meant that for a tenth-consecutive season Hawthorn won at least 10 games. Hawthorn finished the season in ninth-place with an 11–11 record, thus missing the finals for the second time in the last three seasons.

== Club summary ==
The 2019 AFL season was the 123rd season of the VFL/AFL competition since its inception in 1897; having entered the competition in 1925, it was the 95th season contested by the Hawthorn Football Club. Tasmania and iiNet continued as the club's two major sponsors, as they have done since 2006 and 2013 respectively, while Adidas continued to manufacture the club's on-and-off field apparel, as they have done since 2013. Hawthorn continued its alignment with the Box Hill Hawks Football Club in the Victorian Football League, allowing Hawthorn-listed players to play with the Box Hill Hawks when not selected in AFL matches.

== Senior personnel ==
On 30 August 2018, it was announced that assistant coach Brett Ratten would be joining St Kilda as an assistant coach following the conclusion of the 2018 season. On 4 October 2018, it was announced that Chris Newman would be elevated from coach of Victorian Football League affiliate Box Hill Hawks to an assistant coach. Max Bailey was appointed as coach of Box Hill. On 6 October 2018, it was announced that coach Alastair Clarkson had signed a 3-year contract extension, keeping Clarkson at the club until the end of the 2022 season. On 8 October 2018, it was confirmed that Director of High Performance Andrew Russell would be departing the club after fourteen seasons, having accepted a position at Carlton. On 19 October 2018, it was announced that former player and 2008 AFL premiership captain Sam Mitchell would return to the club as an assistant coach, having been an assistant coach at West Coast and helping the club win the 2018 AFL Grand Final. On 3 November 2018, Torin Baker was announced as the new development coach, filling the role previously held by Max Bailey. On 27 November 2018, it was announced that Jarryd Roughead would not continue on as captain in 2019. Ben Stratton would be named as Roughead's successor on 28 February 2019.

== Playing list changes ==
=== Trades ===
| 16 October 2018 | To Hawthorn Jack Scrimshaw; 4th round pick, 2019 AFL draft | To Gold Coast 3rd round pick, 2019 AFL draft |
| 16 October 2018 | To Hawthorn Tom Scully | To Greater Western Sydney 4th round pick, 2019 AFL draft (via Gold Coast) |
| 16 October 2018 | To Hawthorn 4th round pick, 2019 AFL draft | To Western Bulldogs Taylor Duryea |
| 17 October 2018 | To Hawthorn Chad Wingard; 3rd round pick, 2019 AFL draft | To Port Adelaide Ryan Burton; Pick 15, 2018 AFL draft Pick 35, 2018 AFL draft 4th round pick, 2019 AFL draft (via Western Bulldogs) |
| 23 November 2018 | To Hawthorn Pick 63, 2018 AFL draft 5th round pick, 2019 AFL draft | To Collingwood 4th round pick, 2019 AFL draft |

- Draft picks accurate at the time of the trade.

=== Free agency ===
==== Additions ====
| Date | Player | F/A Type | 2018 team | Compensation | Ref |
|---|---|---|---|---|---|
| 1 November 2018 | Darren Minchington | DFA | St Kilda | None | |
| 14 March 2019 | Ned Reeves | SSP | —N/a | None | |

=== Draft ===
==== AFL draft ====
| Round | Overall pick | Player | Recruited from | ref |
|---|---|---|---|---|
| 3 | 52 | Jacob Koschitzke | Murray Bushrangers | |
| 4 | 63 | Mathew Walker | Murray Bushrangers | |

==== Rookie draft ====
| Round | Overall pick | Player | Recruited from | ref |
|---|---|---|---|---|
| 1 | 14 | Damon Greaves | East Perth | |
| 2 | 30 | Will Golds | Oakleigh Chargers | |
| 3 | 43 | Tim Mohr | Greater Western Sydney | |
| 4 | 68 | Will Langford (Note: Langford was delisted by Hawthorn and subsequently retired on 29 October 2018, but was re-drafted as a rookie for list management purposes.) | Hawthorn | |

=== Retirements and delistings ===
| Date | Player | 2019 team | Reason | Ref |
|---|---|---|---|---|
| 15 November 2017 | Ty Vickery | —N/a | Retired | |
| 4 July 2018 | Cyril Rioli | —N/a | Retired | |
| 26 September 2018 | Kurt Heatherley | —N/a | Delisted | |
| 26 September 2018 | Jonathan O'Rourke | —N/a | Delisted | |
| 26 September 2018 | Dallas Willsmore | —N/a | Delisted | |
| 29 October 2018 | Kieran Lovell | —N/a | Delisted | |
| 29 October 2018 | Brendan Whitecross | —N/a | Delisted | |

== 2019 player squad ==
2019 Hawthorn Football Club squad
| Senior list | | Rookie list | Coaching staff |
|---|---|---|---|
| 1 Harry Morrison; 2 Jarryd Roughead; 3 Tom Mitchell; 4 Jarman Impey; 5 James Worpel; 6 James Sicily; 7 Ben McEvoy; 8 Mitchell Lewis; 9 Shaun Burgoyne; 10 Jaeger O'Meara; 12 James Frawley; 13 Conor Glass; 14 Grant Birchall; 15 Blake Hardwick; 16 Isaac Smith; 17 Daniel Howe; 18 Jonathon Ceglar; 19 Jack Gunston (VC); 20 Chad Wingard | 21 Tom Scully; 22 Luke Breust; 23 Tim O'Brien; 24 Ben Stratton (C); 25 Ryan Schoenmakers; 26 Liam Shiels; 27 Marc Pittonet; 28 Paul Puopolo; 30 Kaiden Brand; 31 Ricky Henderson; 32 David Mirra; 33 Mathew Walker; 34 Jacob Koschitzke; 35 Jack Scrimshaw; 36 Dylan Moore; 37 Jackson Ross; 38 Darren Minchington; 42 Teia Miles; 46 James Cousins | 11 Conor Nash (B); 29 Changkuoth Jiath (B); 39 Tim Mohr; 40 Harry Jones; 41 Oliver Hanrahan; 44 Damon Greaves; 45 Will Golds; 47 Ned Reeves; Will Langford (ret) | Head coach: Alastair Clarkson; Assistant coaches: Damian Carroll (Head of development and learning); Adem Yze (Match day strategy and opposition); Darren Glass (Defence); Scott Burns (Forwards); Chris Newman (Stoppages); Sam Mitchell (Midfield); Damian Monkhorst (Ruck); Marco Bello (Football academy & head of development); Torin Baker (Development coach); Max Bailey (VFL Box Hill Football Club coach); Legend: (c) Captain(s); (vc) Vice-captain(s); Injured; Upgraded rookie(s); (ret) Retired; (B) Category B rookie; (FA) Free agent; Updated: 17 August 2019; Source(s): HFC Website; Coaches |

== JLT Community series ==
| Rd | Date and local time | Opponent | Scores (Hawthorn's scores indicated in bold) | | | Venue | Report |
| Rd | Date and local time | Opponent | Home | Away | Result | Venue | Report |
|---|---|---|---|---|---|---|---|
| 1 | Sunday, 3 March (12:40 pm) | Brisbane Lions | 15.12 (102) | **8.12 (60)** | Lost by 42 points | Moreton Bay Central Sports Complex (A) | Report |
| 2 | Saturday, 9 March (7:10 pm) | Richmond | **13.9 (87)** | 14.11 (95) | Lost by 8 points | University of Tasmania Stadium (H) | Report |

== Home & Away season ==
Hawthorn's fixture was released on November 1.

| Rd | Date and local time | Opponent | Scores (Hawthorn's scores indicated in bold) | | | Venue | Record | Report |
| Rd | Date and local time | Opponent | Home | Away | Result | Venue | Record | Report |
|---|---|---|---|---|---|---|---|---|
| 1 | Saturday, 23 March (4:05 pm) | Adelaide | 7.13 (55) | **12.15 (87)** | Won by 32 points | Adelaide Oval (A) | 1–0 | Report |
| 2 | Sunday, 31 March (3:20 pm) | Western Bulldogs | **13.9 (87)** | 16.10 (106) | Lost by 19 points | Melbourne Cricket Ground (H) | 1–1 | Report |
| 3 | Sunday, 7 April (3:20 pm) | North Melbourne | **13.9 (87)** | 10.11 (71) | Won by 16 points | Melbourne Cricket Ground (H) | 2–1 | Report |
| 4 | Sunday, 14 April (3:20 pm) | St Kilda | 10.14 (74) | **10.9 (69)** | Lost by 5 points | Marvel Stadium (A) | 2–2 | Report |
| 5 | Monday, 22 April (3:20 pm) | Geelong | **13.12 (90)** | 17.11 (113) | Lost by 23 points | Melbourne Cricket Ground (H) | 2–3 | Report |
| 6 | Sunday, 28 April (3:20 pm) | Carlton | **13.15 (93)** | 13.10 (88) | Won by 5 points | University of Tasmania Stadium (H) | 3–3 | Report |
| 7 | Saturday, 4 May (1:45 pm) | Melbourne | 11.13 (79) | **11.8 (74)** | Lost by 5 points | Melbourne Cricket Ground (A) | 3–4 | Report |
| 8 | Sunday, 12 May (3:20 pm) | Greater Western Sydney | **10.11 (71)** | 5.8 (38) | Won by 33 points | Melbourne Cricket Ground (H) | 4–4 | Report |
| 9 | Sunday, 19 May (3:20 pm) | Richmond | 14.11 (95) | **8.11 (59)** | Lost by 36 points | Melbourne Cricket Ground (A) | 4–5 | Report |
| 10 | Saturday, 25 May (1:45 pm) | Port Adelaide | **12.8 (80)** | 6.13 (49) | Won by 31 points | University of Tasmania Stadium (H) | 5–5 | Report |
| 11 | Saturday, 1 June (7:25 pm) | Brisbane Lions | 12.13 (85) | **10.6 (66)** | Lost by 19 points | The Gabba (A) | 5–6 | Report |
| 12 | Bye | | | | | | | |
| 13 | Friday, 14 June (7:50 pm) | Essendon | 14.12 (96) | **11.11 (77)** | Lost by 19 points | Marvel Stadium (A) | 5–7 | Report |
| 14 | Friday, 21 June (7:50 pm) | Sydney | 12.10 (82) | **9.9 (63)** | Lost by 19 points | Sydney Cricket Ground (A) | 5–8 | Report |
| 15 | Saturday, 29 June (1:45 pm) | West Coast | **9.17 (71)** | 11.11 (77) | Lost by 6 points | Melbourne Cricket Ground (H) | 5–9 | Report |
| 16 | Friday, 5 July (7:50 pm) | Collingwood | **9.13 (67)** | 9.9 (63) | Won by 4 points | Melbourne Cricket Ground (H) | 6–9 | Report |
| 17 | Saturday, 13 July (2:10 pm) | Fremantle | **12.12 (84)** | 8.5 (53) | Won by 31 points | University of Tasmania Stadium (H) | 7–9 | Report |
| 18 | Sunday, 21 July (1:10 pm) | Geelong | 8.13 (61) | **12.13 (85)** | Won by 24 points | Melbourne Cricket Ground (A) | 8–9 | Report |
| 19 | Saturday, 27 July (1:45 pm) | Brisbane Lions | **7.18 (60)** | 13.9 (87) | Lost by 27 points | University of Tasmania Stadium (H) | 8–10 | Report |
| 20 | Friday, 2 August (7:50 pm) | North Melbourne | 12.14 (86) | **9.10 (64)** | Lost by 22 points | Marvel Stadium (A) | 8–11 | Report |
| 21 | Friday, 9 August (7:50 pm) | Greater Western Sydney | 4.5 (29) | **13.7 (85)** | Won by 56 points | UNSW Canberra Oval (A) | 9–11 | Report |
| 22 | Sunday, 18 August (4:40 pm) | Gold Coast | **18.10 (118)** | 7.6 (48) | Won by 70 points | Marvel Stadium (H) | 10–11 | Report |
| 23 | Saturday, 24 August (6:10 pm) | West Coast | 9.13 (67) | **16.9 (105)** | Won by 38 points | Optus Stadium (A) | 11–11 | Report |

=== Ladder ===
| Pos | Team | Pld | W | L | D | PF | PA | PP | Pts | Qualification |
|---|---|---|---|---|---|---|---|---|---|---|
| 1 | Geelong | 22 | 16 | 6 | 0 | 1984 | 1462 | 135.7 | 64 | Finals series |
| 2 | Brisbane Lions | 22 | 16 | 6 | 0 | 2004 | 1694 | 118.3 | 64 | Finals series |
| 3 | Richmond (P) | 22 | 16 | 6 | 0 | 1892 | 1664 | 113.7 | 64 | Finals series |
| 4 | Collingwood | 22 | 15 | 7 | 0 | 1885 | 1601 | 117.7 | 60 | Finals series |
| 5 | West Coast | 22 | 15 | 7 | 0 | 1902 | 1691 | 112.5 | 60 | Finals series |
| 6 | Greater Western Sydney | 22 | 13 | 9 | 0 | 1926 | 1669 | 115.4 | 52 | Finals series |
| 7 | Western Bulldogs | 22 | 12 | 10 | 0 | 1941 | 1810 | 107.2 | 48 | Finals series |
| 8 | Essendon | 22 | 12 | 10 | 0 | 1702 | 1784 | 95.4 | 48 | Finals series |
| **9** | Hawthorn | **22** | **11** | **11** | **0** | **1742** | **1602** | **108.7** | 44 | |
| 10 | Port Adelaide | 22 | 11 | 11 | 0 | 1806 | 1714 | 105.4 | 44 | |
| 11 | Adelaide | 22 | 10 | 12 | 0 | 1776 | 1761 | 100.9 | 40 | |
| 12 | North Melbourne | 22 | 10 | 12 | 0 | 1824 | 1834 | 99.5 | 40 | |
| 13 | Fremantle | 22 | 9 | 13 | 0 | 1579 | 1718 | 91.9 | 36 | |
| 14 | St Kilda | 22 | 9 | 13 | 0 | 1645 | 1961 | 83.9 | 36 | |
| 15 | Sydney | 22 | 8 | 14 | 0 | 1706 | 1746 | 97.7 | 32 | |
| 16 | Carlton | 22 | 7 | 15 | 0 | 1609 | 1905 | 84.5 | 28 | |
| 17 | Melbourne | 22 | 5 | 17 | 0 | 1569 | 1995 | 78.6 | 20 | |
| 18 | Gold Coast | 22 | 3 | 19 | 0 | 1351 | 2232 | 60.5 | 12 | |

Source: AFL Tables
Rules for classification: 1) points; 2) percentage; 3) number of points for.
(P) Premiers

== Awards, records and milestones ==
=== Awards ===
Club awards

- Peter Crimmins Medal: James Worpel
- Most consistent player: Jarman Impey
- Most promising player: Mitchell Lewis
- Best clubman: Jonathon Ceglar
- Best first year player (debut season): Oliver Hanrahan

=== Records ===
==== Club records ====
- Most contested marks: 317 – Jarryd Roughead
- Most marks inside 50: 633 – Jarryd Roughead
- Most tackles: 1,233 – Liam Shiels
- Most games coached: 351 – Alastair Clarkson
- Most victories coached: 216 – Alastair Clarkson
- Most home and away games coached: 325 – Alastair Clarkson
- Most home and away victories coached: 200 – Alastair Clarkson
- Most rebound 50's in a season: 137 – James Sicily
- Most rebound 50's in a single game: 15 – James Sicily (Tied with Luke Hodge)

=== Milestones ===
- **Round 1**
  - Jarman Impey – 100th AFL game.
  - Ben McEvoy – 50th goal for Hawthorn.
  - Jack Scrimshaw – Hawthorn debut.
- **Round 2**
  - Tom Scully – Hawthorn debut.
- **Round 3**
  - Dylan Moore – AFL debut.
  - Chad Wingard – Hawthorn debut
  - Chad Wingard – 1st goal for Hawthorn.
- **Round 4**
  - Ben McEvoy – 100th game for Hawthorn.
  - Tom Scully – 1st goal for Hawthorn.
- **Round 5**
  - Chad Wingard – 150th AFL game.
  - Mitchell Lewis – 1st AFL goal.
- **Round 6**
  - Blake Hardwick – 50th AFL game.
- **Round 7**
  - Jaeger O'Meara – 50th AFL goal.
- **Round 8**
  - Jack Gunston – 350th AFL goal.
- **Round 9**
  - Tim O'Brien – 50th AFL game.
  - Dylan Moore – 1st AFL goal.
- **Round 10**
  - Ricky Henderson – 50th game for Hawthorn.
- **Round 13**
  - Jarman Impey – 50th AFL goal.
  - Conor Glass – 1st AFL goal.
- **Round 15**
  - Oliver Hanrahan – AFL debut
  - Oliver Hanrahan – 1st AFL goal.
- **Round 16**
  - Luke Breust – 200th AFL game.
  - Ben McEvoy – 200th AFL game.
- **Round 18**
  - Liam Shiels – 200th AFL game.
- **Round 21**
  - Ricky Henderson – 150th AFL game.
  - Changkuoth Jiath – AFL debut.
- **Round 22**
  - Alastair Clarkson – 350th AFL game as coach.
- **Round 23**
  - Isaac Smith – 200th AFL game.
  - Alastair Clarkson – 200th Home and Away game won as coach.
