= Jack Gunston =

Australian rules footballer (born 1991)

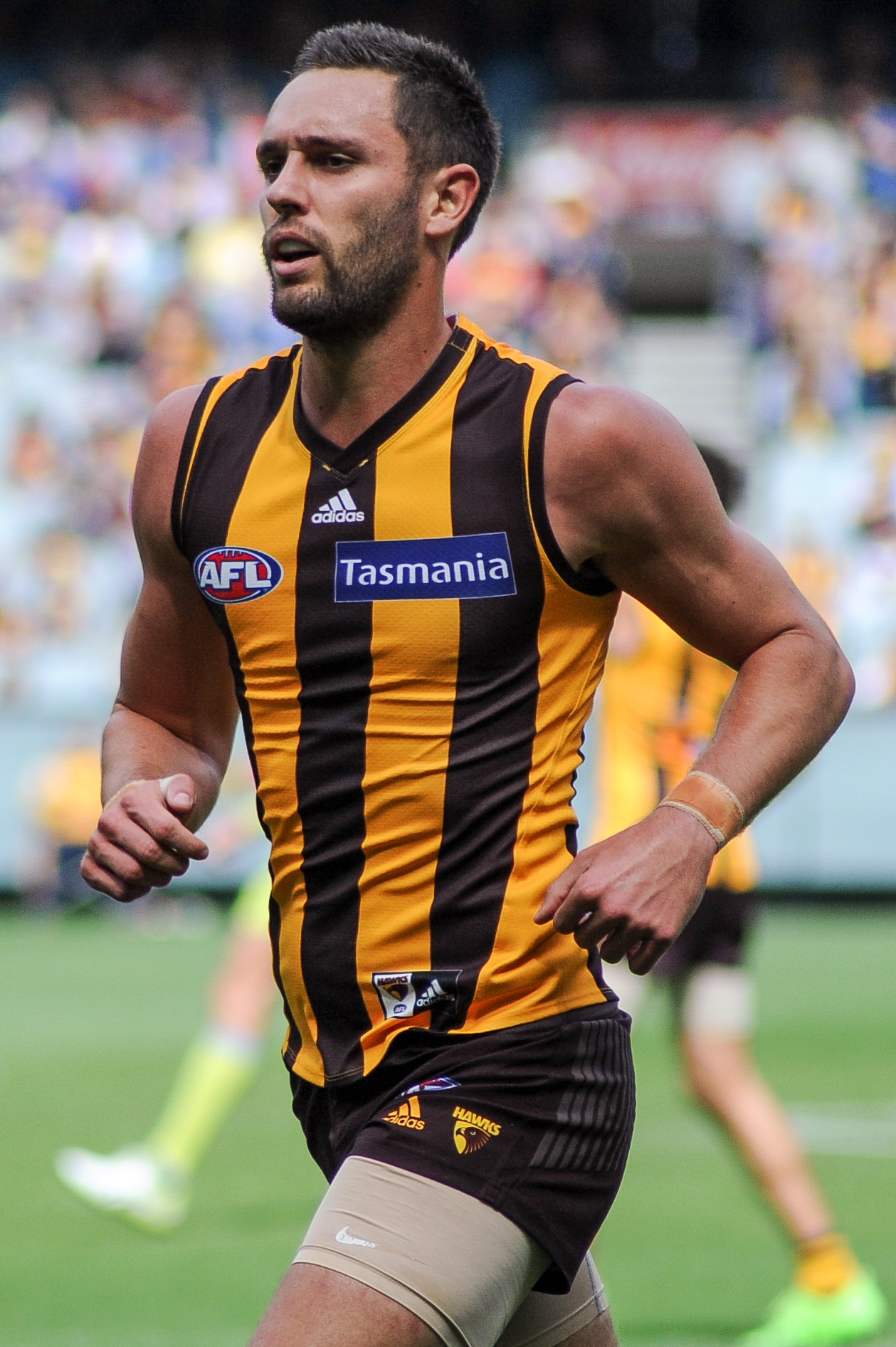
- Gunston playing for Hawthorn in April 2017

Personal information
- Full name: Jack Gunston
- Nicknames: Gunners, Unc
- Born: 16 October 1991 (age 35)
- Original team: Sandringham Dragons (TAC Cup)/Beaumaris
- Draft: No. 29, 2009 national draft
- Debut: Round 9, 2010, Adelaide vs. Brisbane Lions, at AAMI Stadium
- Height: 193 cm (6 ft 4 in)
- Weight: 87 kg (192 lb)
- Position: Key forward

Club information
- Current club: Hawthorn
- Number: 19

Playing career^{1}
Years	Club	Games (Goals)
2010–2011	Adelaide	14 (20)
2012–2022	Hawthorn	211 (410)
2023	Brisbane Lions	17 (22)
2024–	Hawthorn	60 (168)
Total		302 (620)

Representative team honours^{2}
Years	Team	Games (Goals)
2026	Victoria	1 (0)

International team honours^{2}
2017	Australia	2 (0)
- ^{1} Playing statistics correct to the end of 2026.^{2} Representative statistics correct as of 2026.

Career highlights
- 3× AFL premiership player: 2013, 2014, 2015; 2× All Australian team: 2018, 2025; 2× Peter Crimmins Medal: 2020, 2025; 5× Hawthorn leading goalkicker: 2015, 2016, 2020, 2025, 2026; 22under22 team: 2014

Jack Gunston (born 16 October 1991) is a professional Australian footballer who plays for the Hawthorn Football Club in the Australian Football League (AFL). He previously played for the Brisbane Lions and the Adelaide Football Club.

== Early life ==
Gunston was raised in Melbourne in Beaumaris and attended Haileybury College from Prep to year 12, he played school football alongside three other future AFL players (Tom Scully, Jack Hutchins, and Tom Lynch). His father, Ray Gunston, played VFA football for Brunswick, and later moved into sports administration. Gunston began his junior career with the Beaumaris Football Club. He originally played mainly as a midfielder, but after growing 15 centimetres (5.9 in) in two years he began to play more in key positions. In 2009, the year he became eligible for the AFL draft, Gunston was selected for the Sandringham Dragons, a TAC Cup team. Early in the season, he dislocated his elbow in a practice game, an injury which took eight weeks to heal. Gunston played for the Dragons in only their last six matches, but was nonetheless a second-round pick in the 2009 AFL National Draft, taken by Adelaide with the 29th pick overall.

== AFL career ==
=== Adelaide (2010–2011) ===
Gunston made his AFL debut for Adelaide against the Brisbane Lions in round 9 of the 2010 AFL season. In a promising debut Gunston collected seven disposals and kicked a vital goal in the final quarter. He played one more game in round 18 against Richmond, collecting nine disposals. He finished the year helping Central District win the 2010 SANFL premiership.

In 2011, Gunston played 12 games for Adelaide, kicking five goals against Richmond in round 23.

After two years in Adelaide, Gunston became homesick and sought to return to Victoria. He refused to participate in the finals series for Central District, choosing to return home to Victoria before the end of the SANFL season. Adelaide had awarded him the Mark Bickley Award as the club's best young player, but he was stripped of the title after announcing his intention to leave.

=== Hawthorn (2012–2022) ===
He was traded to Hawthorn in a deal that saw three draft picks (pick 24, 46 & 64) given to Adelaide and two picks returned (pick 53 and 71).

In his first season at Hawthorn he played 19 games, including the 2012 Grand Final, and followed up in 2013 with 23 games.

Gunston played in the 2013 Grand Final against Fremantle, and was one of the best players on the ground, kicking 4 goals to be the leading goalkicker in the match and finishing second in the Norm Smith Medal count to teammate Brian Lake. Gunston played an important role as key forward in 2014, finishing with a career-high 58 goals for the season and earning his second premiership as Hawthorn triumphed in the 2014 Grand Final. In 2015, Gunston was Hawthorn's leading goalkicker, kicking 57 goals. He injured his knee in the Qualifying Final against the West Coast Eagles, but he returned in the Grand Final to kick 4 goals, in Hawthorn's three-peat victory against the Eagles once more.

In 2016, Gunston was forced to take on new roles due to the season-ending injury received by Jarryd Roughead, occasionally moving into the centre. Regardless, he kicked 51 goals over the home-and-away season and the finals, and he was widely regarded as being in excellent form.

Gunston had a poor beginning to 2017, not kicking a large number of goals. As both a result of this and a large number of injuries suffered by Hawthorn's key defenders, Gunston was moved into the backline, where he significantly improved his performance.

Gunston was moved back into the forward line for 2018. He enjoyed good form, forming a forward partnership with Luke Breust with the pair kicking a combined 105 goals between them. Gunston personally kicked 48 goals and came equal 6th in the Coleman Medal.

In February 2019, it was announced that Gunston had been appointed vice-captain, alongside the new captain, Ben Stratton. His forward partnership with Breust was not as effective as the previous season, with the pair kicking only a combined 60 goals between them, and Hawthorn missed the finals.

Gunston missed the majority of the 2021 season, playing just one game. He suffered a back injury that required surgery, before a premature comeback and recurrence of the injury required further surgery to correct the issue.

Gunston returned to full fitness in the 2022 season, finishing with 32 goals from 16 games and ending the season rated as 'above average' for marks inside 50, goals and score involvements.

Gunston collected 47 Brownlow Medal votes over the first part of his career at Hawthorn.

=== Brisbane Lions (2023) ===
At the conclusion of the 2022 AFL season, Gunston expressed a desire to move to the Brisbane Lions as a free agent. However, in order to avoid diluting their free agency compensation for losing Daniel McStay, the Lions instead sought to trade for Gunston, ultimately acquiring him on 11 October in exchange for AFL draft pick 48 and a future fourth-round selection.

Gunston's 2023 AFL season was cut short by a knee injury sustained late in the year. Although he was available for selection ahead of the preliminary final, he encouraged Lions coach Chris Fagan to retain the team's successful lineup rather than bring him back for the clash against Carlton at the Gabba. As a result, Gunston was not selected for either the preliminary final or the 2023 AFL Grand Final, which Brisbane ultimately lost to Collingwood.

=== Return to Hawthorn (2024–) ===
After one season at Brisbane, Gunston requested a trade back to Hawthorn, and he was traded on the final day of trade period.

In the 2025 season, Gunston kicked a career-high 7 goals against North Melbourne in round 16 in Launceston. It brought his total to 70 goals kicked at the venue, behind only Jarryd Roughead, Lance Franklin and Luke Breust. He was rewarded for his outstanding season, in which he finished third in the Coleman Medal with 65 goals (after the home-and-away season), won his second All-Australian blazer, and won his second Peter Crimmins Medal.

== Playing style ==
Gunston has a reputation for being very accurate in kicking for goal from set shots, being frequently described as a "sharp-shooter". He is said to have a "very balanced, methodical set-shot routine", with a focus on a straight drop. Towards the end of the 2013 season, it was reported that Gunston had the best conversion rate out of the top 50 goalkickers in the competition, with 82.5 percent of his set shots from the past two seasons resulting in goals.

== Statistics ==
Updated to the end of 2026.

Legend
G	Goals	K	Kicks	D	Disposals	T	Tackles
B	Behinds	H	Handballs	M	Marks
#	Played in that season's premiership team	†	Led the league for the season

Season	Team	No.	Games	Totals							Averages (per game)							Votes
Season	Team	No.	Games	G	B	K	H	D	M	T	G	B	K	H	D	M	T	Votes
2010	Adelaide	28	2	1	0	11	5	16	5	4	0.5	0.0	5.5	2.5	8.0	2.5	2.0	0
2011	Adelaide	6	12	19	11	90	39	129	60	21	1.6	0.9	7.5	3.3	10.8	5.0	1.8	0
2012	Hawthorn	19	19	39	22	139	87	226	78	29	2.1	1.2	7.3	4.6	11.9	4.1	1.5	0
2013^{#}	Hawthorn	19	23	46	17	228	127	355	128	57	2.0	0.7	9.9	5.5	15.4	5.6	2.5	1
2014^{#}	Hawthorn	19	23	58	27	238	132	370	137	41	2.5	1.2	10.3	5.7	16.1	6.0	1.8	6
2015^{#}	Hawthorn	19	24	57	35	277	119	396	179	52	2.4	1.5	11.5	5.0	16.5	7.5	2.2	7
2016	Hawthorn	19	24	51	33	260	125	385	154	71	2.1	1.4	10.8	5.2	16.0	6.4	3.0	4
2017	Hawthorn	19	22	19	11	278	138	416	132	58	0.9	0.5	12.6	6.3	18.9	6.0	2.6	6
2018	Hawthorn	19	23	51	32	292	117	409	125	46	2.2	1.4	12.7	5.1	17.8	5.4	2.0	10
2019	Hawthorn	19	20	26	21	221	89	310	111	46	1.3	1.1	11.1	4.5	15.5	5.6	2.3	5
2020 (Note: The 2020 season was played with 17 home-and-away matches per team (down from 22) and 16-minute quarters with time on (down from 20-minute quarters with time on) due to the impact of the COVID-19 pandemic.)	Hawthorn	19	16	31	21	133	47	180	68	24	1.9	1.3	8.3	2.9	11.3	4.3	1.5	5
2021	Hawthorn	19	1	0	0	6	1	7	1	2	0.0	0.0	6.0	1.0	7.0	1.0	2.0	0
2022	Hawthorn	19	16	32	24	129	43	172	70	22	2.0	1.5	8.1	2.7	10.8	4.4	1.4	3
2023	Brisbane Lions	19	17	22	14	134	36	170	88	16	1.3	0.8	7.9	2.1	10.0	5.2	0.9	3
2024	Hawthorn	19	18	29	17	120	39	159	82	21	1.6	0.9	6.7	2.2	8.8	4.6	1.2	3
2025	Hawthorn	19	23	73	37	218	71	289	119	31	3.2	1.6	9.5	3.1	12.6	5.2	1.3	7
2026	Hawthorn	19	19	66	37	170	29	199	109	18	3.5^{†}	2.0	9.0	1.5	10.5	5.7	1.0	9
Career			302	620	359	2944	1244	4188	1646	559	2.1	1.2	9.8	4.1	13.9	5.5	1.9	69

== Honours and achievements ==
Team

- 3× AFL premiership player: 2013, 2014, 2015
- 2× Minor premiership: 2012, 2013
- 3× McClelland Trophy: 2012, 2013, 2024

Individual

- 2× All-Australian team: 2018, 2025
- 2× Peter Crimmins Medal: 2020, 2025
- 5× Hawthorn leading goalkicker: 2015, 2016, 2020, 2025, 2026
- 22under22 team: 2014
- Australia international rules football team: 2017
- State of Origin selection, 2025

== Personal life ==
Gunston's partner is Melbourne model Dani Shreeve.
