= Jackson Callow =

Australian rules football player

Personal information
- Full name: Jackson Callow
- Born: 11 June 2002 (age 24); Launceston, Tasmania, Australia
- Original team: North Launceston
- Draft: No. 17, 2021 mid-season rookie draft
- Debut: Round 7, 2022, Hawthorn vs. Melbourne, at Melbourne Cricket Ground
- Height: 194 cm (6 ft 4 in)
- Weight: 96 kg (212 lb)
- Position: Forward

Club information
- Current club: Norwood Football Club

Playing career^{1}
Years	Club	Games (Goals)
2021–2022	Hawthorn	3 (0)
- ^{1} Playing statistics correct to the end of the 2022 season.

Career highlights
- SANFL premiership player: 2026

Jackson Callow (born 11 June 2002) is a professional Australian rules footballer who currently plays for the Norwood Football Club in the South Australian National Football League (SANFL). He previously played with the Hawthorn Football Club in the Australian Football League (AFL).

== Early career ==
Jackson Callow is a Tasmanian who grew up in Launceston. Callow first came to notice as a junior at Prospect Hawks Junior Football Club. He played in the Club's NTJFA U13 premiership in his first season (2015) and then captained the Hawks NTJFA U14 premiership team in 2016. Following another season at the Club and in the Tasmanian talent programs he was transferred to the Tasmanian State League.

Thereafter Callow developed his craft playing for the North Launceston and the Tasmanian Devils. He was a member of the North Launceston team that won a Tasmanian State League flag in 2019.

In 2021 Callow made the journey across Bass Strait to Norwood and later spent the pre-season training with Hawthorn. He had hoped to get rookie drafted but was not selected. Callow accepted an offer from Norwood in South Australia where he lined up at centre half forward.

== AFL career ==
Callow was selected with Pick 17 in the 2021 mid-season draft, having made an impression playing for Norwood in the SANFL during the first half of the 2021 SANFL season. The following week Callow lined up for Box Hill Hawks in the Victorian Football League where he played out the season.

In 2022, Callow was brought into the Hawthorn`s senior side following injuries to several of the club`s key ruckmen, Ben McEvoy, Max Lynch and Ned Reeves. In his debut, he faced Melbourne ruckman Max Gawn, one of the competition`s leading players in the position. Callow retained his place for the following round before returning to Box Hill.

== Statistics ==
Updated to the end of the 2022 season.

Legend
G	Goals	K	Kicks	D	Disposals	T	Tackles
B	Behinds	H	Handballs	M	Marks

Season	Team	No.	Games	Totals							Averages (per game)							Votes
Season	Team	No.	Games	G	B	K	H	D	M	T	G	B	K	H	D	M	T	Votes
2021	Hawthorn	45	0	—	—	—	—	—	—	—	—	—	—	—	—	—	—	0
2022	Hawthorn	45	3	0	2	9	15	24	8	5	0.0	0.7	3.0	5.0	8.0	2.7	1.7	0
Career			3	0	2	9	15	24	8	5	0.0	0.7	3.0	5.0	8.0	2.7	1.7	0
