= Connor Downie =

Australian rules football player

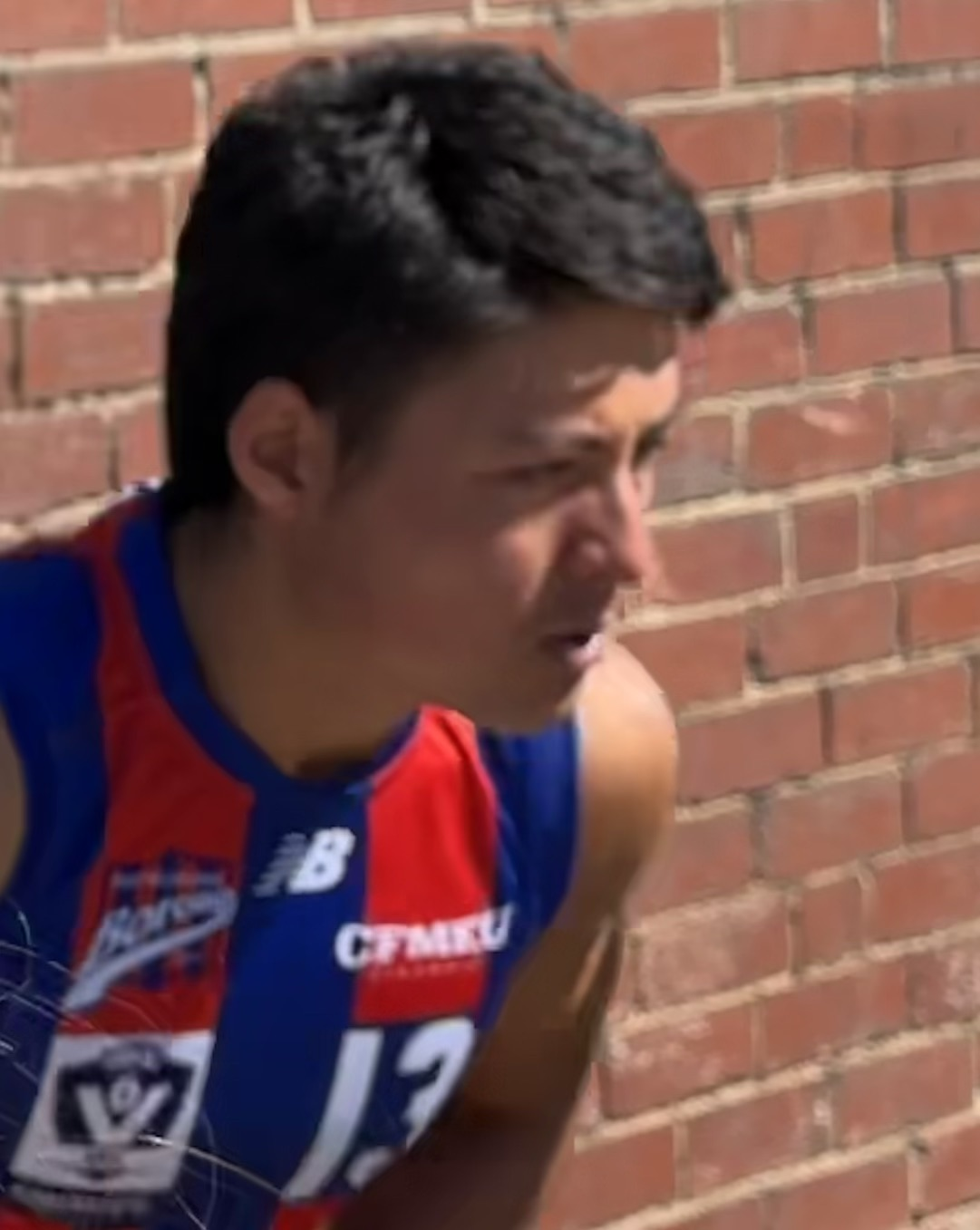
- Downie in April 2026

Personal information
- Born: 31 May 2002 (age 24)
- Draft: No. 35, 2020 national draft
- Debut: Round 1, 2021, Hawthorn vs. Essendon, at Marvel Stadium
- Height: 185 cm (6 ft 1 in)
- Weight: 82 kg (181 lb)
- Position: Midfielder

Playing career^{1}
Years	Club	Games (Goals)
2021–2022	Hawthorn	2 (0)
- ^{1} Playing statistics correct to the end of the 2022 season.

Connor Downie (born 31 May 2002) is a former professional Australian rules footballer who played for the Hawthorn Football Club in the Australian Football League (AFL).

== AFL career ==
Downie's introduction to the sport was through the Auskick program.

Downie is a product of Hawthorn's Next Generation Academy, because of his Chinese heritage. He was one of the youngest named in a stacked Vic Metro U18s side for 2019.

In the 2020 AFL draft Hawthorn through the club's Next Generation Academy, had the opportunity to match the North Melbourne bid and thus secured him with pick 35.

Downie debuted for Hawthorn as part of the trio that debuted in the opening round of the 2021 AFL season against Essendon at Marvel Stadium. Downie was designated as the medical sub for the game but he wasn't needed and didn't spend any time on the ground. The match will always be counted as his first AFL appearance. He came into the team as a late replacement for the round 22 clash against the Western Bulldogs in Launceston. He helped his team defeat the 2021 premiership contenders.

On September 2, 2022, the Hawthorn Football Club announced that Downie would not continue with the club in the 2023 season.

== Statistics ==
Updated to the end of the 2022 season.

Legend
G	Goals	K	Kicks	D	Disposals	T	Tackles
B	Behinds	H	Handballs	M	Marks

Season	Team	No.	Games	Totals							Averages (per game)							Votes
Season	Team	No.	Games	G	B	K	H	D	M	T	G	B	K	H	D	M	T	Votes
2021	Hawthorn	41	2	0	0	6	6	12	2	0	0.0	0.0	3.0	3.0	6.0	1.0	0.0	0
2022	Hawthorn	41	0	—	—	—	—	—	—	—	—	—	—	—	—	—	—	0
Career			2	0	0	6	6	12	2	0	0.0	0.0	3.0	3.0	6.0	1.0	0.0	0
