= Emerson Jeka =

Australian rules footballer (born 2001)

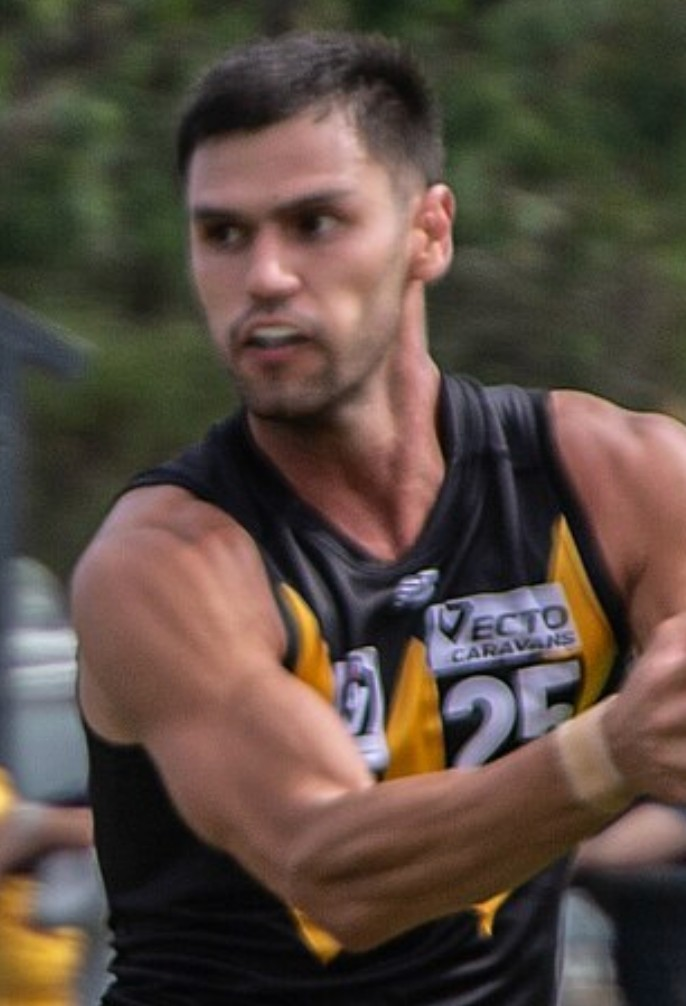
- Jeka playing for Werribee in 2026

Personal information
- Full name: Emerson Jeka
- Born: 18 September 2001 (age 25)
- Original teams: Altona (WRFL); Western Jets (TAC Cup)
- Draft: No. 9, 2020 rookie draft No. 7, 2024 rookie draft
- Debut: Round 7, 2021, Hawthorn vs. St Kilda, at Marvel Stadium
- Height: 198 cm (6 ft 6 in)
- Weight: 93 kg (205 lb)
- Position: Key Forward

Playing career^{1}
Years	Club	Games (Goals)
2020–2023	Hawthorn	7 (2)
2024	Geelong	0 (0)
Total		7 (2)
- ^{1} Playing statistics correct to the end of 2024.

Emerson Jeka (born 18 September 2001) an Australian rules footballer who played for the Hawthorn Football Club in the Australian Football League (AFL). Jeka also spent time on the playing list of the Geelong Football Club, however never played a senior match.

== Career ==
=== Early career ===
Jeka played the majority of his NAB League career in the forward line. He suffered a knee injury while representing an Australian under-18 team against Victorian Football League (VFL) club Casey at the MCG in April 2019. He was sidelined for almost two months, but was selected by Hawthorn with Pick 9 in the 2020 AFL rookie draft.

=== AFL ===
Jeka first played for Hawthorn's Victorian Football League (VFL) affiliate Box Hill, showing promise during scratch matches in the COVID-19-affected 2020 season.

Jeka made his AFL debut against St Kilda at Marvel Stadium in round 7 of the 2023 AFL season. He later kicked 0.7 in a VFL match on 3 July 2021.

He was promoted to Hawthorn's senior list in December 2021 for the 2022 season.

At the end of the 2023 AFL season, Jeka was delisted by Hawthorn. On 14 November 2023, he signed with Essendon's reserves team for the 2024 VFL season, but 12 days later he returned to the AFL and joined Geelong.

Jeka was delisted by Geelong at the end of the 2024 AFL season without playing a single senior game for the Cats. He played 19 games for Geelong's reserves team during the 2024 VFL season.

== Statistics ==
Updated to the end of the 2024 season.

Legend
G	Goals	K	Kicks	D	Disposals	T	Tackles
B	Behinds	H	Handballs	M	Marks

Season	Team	No.	Games	Totals							Averages (per game)							Votes
Season	Team	No.	Games	G	B	K	H	D	M	T	G	B	K	H	D	M	T	Votes
2020	Hawthorn	39	0	—	—	—	—	—	—	—	—	—	—	—	—	—	—	0
2021	Hawthorn	39	4	2	2	13	13	26	7	4	0.5	0.5	3.3	3.3	6.5	1.8	1.0	0
2022	Hawthorn	39	3	0	0	21	13	34	13	3	0.0	0.0	7.0	4.3	11.3	4.3	1.0	0
2023	Hawthorn	39	0	—	—	—	—	—	—	—	—	—	—	—	—	—	—	0
2024	Geelong	43	0	—	—	—	—	—	—	—	—	—	—	—	—	—	—	0
Career			7	2	2	34	26	60	20	7	0.3	0.3	4.9	3.7	8.6	2.9	1.0	0
