= Tyler Brockman =

Australian rules footballer (born 2002)

Personal information
- Full name: Tyler Brockman
- Born: 22 November 2002 (age 23)
- Original team: Wembley Downs JFC (WA)/Subiaco Colts
- Draft: No. 46, 2020 AFL draft
- Debut: Round 1, 2021, Hawthorn vs. Essendon, at Marvel Stadium
- Height: 180 cm (5 ft 11 in)
- Weight: 80 kg (176 lb)
- Position: Forward

Playing career^{1}
| Years | Club | Games (Goals) |
| 2021–2023 | Hawthorn | 26 (23) |
| 2024–2026 | West Coast | 30 (15) |
| Total | | 56 (38) |
- ^{1} Playing statistics correct to the end of the 2026 season.

Tyler Brockman (born 22 November 2002) is a former professional Australian rules footballer who most recently played for the West Coast Eagles in the Australian Football League (AFL) until 2026. Brockman previously played for Hawthorn from 2021 until 2023.

== Early career ==
Tyler Brockman played his early football with Wembley Downs JFC before moving on to Subiaco's junior team. Brockman who has Indigenous heritage, is also the nephew of former Fremantle and Gold Coast player Greg Broughton.

Brockman had developed into an explosive midfielder/forward that had attracted interest from several AFL clubs. Brockman had met with West Coast Eagles who were said to be keen even though they had only late picks in the 2020 draft. Hawthorn used their pick 46 to secure his services. Brockman was said to be surprised when the Hawks picked him.

== AFL career ==
=== Hawthorn (2021–2023) ===
Brockman settled quickly after arriving at Hawthorn, and showed promise in the practice matches before the 2021 AFL season. In the practice match against North Melbourne he kicked 3 goals in the first quarter. Brockman debuted for Hawthorn as part of the trio that debuted in the opening round of the 2021 AFL season against Essendon at Marvel Stadium. He kicked two goals on debut.

Brockman's 2022 season was ruined by injury, it started with soft tissue issues during the pre-season. Once he had recovered from that he was injured in the opening minutes of his first game for Box Hill. He was placed on the long term injury list after he had a shoulder reconstruction surgery in 2022.

=== West Coast (2024–2026) ===
Following the 2023 AFL season, Brockman requested a trade to a Western Australian club, and was traded to West Coast on 14 October. Struggling for form as a small forward in 2024, Brockman was moved into the midfield under new coach Andrew McQualter during the early weeks of the 2025 season, where he gained some of his best form since his trade to the west.

Despite featuring in 30 games across three seasons for the Eagles, Brockman was delisted by the club following a 2026 AFL season without a senior appearance.

== Legal issues ==
In December 2025, a video emerged which appeared to show Brockman engaging in a street fight in Geraldton. In January 2026, he was charged with one count of grievous bodily harm, with police alleging that he had struck a man in his late teens, and that the victim had suffered serious, but non-life-threatening injuries. Brockman was due to appear in Geraldton Magistrates Court on 19 February, however after his lawyer requested more time to look at relevant material the date was changed to March 26.

== Statistics ==
Updated to the end of the 2026 season.

Legend
| G | Goals | K | Kicks | D | Disposals | T | Tackles |
| B | Behinds | H | Handballs | M | Marks |

| Season | Team | No. | Games | Totals | | | | | | | Averages (per game) | | | | | | | Votes |
| Season | Team | No. | Games | G | B | K | H | D | M | T | G | B | K | H | D | M | T | Votes |
|---|---|---|---|---|---|---|---|---|---|---|---|---|---|---|---|---|---|---|
| 2021 | Hawthorn | 42 | 11 | 10 | 4 | 52 | 46 | 98 | 27 | 23 | 0.9 | 0.4 | 4.7 | 4.2 | 8.9 | 2.5 | 2.1 | 0 |
| 2022 | Hawthorn | 33 | 0 | — | — | — | — | — | — | — | — | — | — | — | — | — | — | 0 |
| 2023 | Hawthorn | 33 | 15 | 13 | 8 | 79 | 88 | 167 | 50 | 34 | 0.9 | 0.5 | 5.3 | 5.9 | 11.1 | 3.3 | 2.3 | 0 |
| 2024 | West Coast | 10 | 10 | 1 | 2 | 38 | 46 | 84 | 19 | 22 | 0.1 | 0.2 | 3.8 | 4.6 | 8.4 | 1.9 | 2.2 | 0 |
| 2025 | West Coast | 10 | 20 | 14 | 12 | 112 | 116 | 228 | 49 | 55 | 0.7 | 0.6 | 5.6 | 5.8 | 11.4 | 2.5 | 2.8 | 0 |
| 2026 | West Coast | 10 | 0 | – | – | – | – | – | – | – | – | – | – | – | – | – | – | 0 |
| Career | | | 56 | 38 | 26 | 281 | 296 | 577 | 145 | 134 | 0.7 | 0.5 | 5.0 | 5.3 | 10.3 | 2.6 | 2.4 | 0 |
