= Lachlan Bramble =

Australian rules football player

Personal information
- Full name: Lachlan Bramble
- Born: 19 April 1998 (age 28)
- Original team: Sunbury (Vic)/Calder Cannons/Williamstown
- Debut: Round 14, 2021, Hawthorn vs. Essendon, at University of Tasmania Stadium
- Height: 182 cm (6 ft 0 in)
- Weight: 77 kg (170 lb)
- Position: Defender

Club information
- Current club: Western Bulldogs
- Number: 29

Playing career^{1}
Years	Club	Games (Goals)
2021–2023	Hawthorn	30 (2)
2024–	Western Bulldogs	68 (11)
Total		96 (13)
- ^{1} Playing statistics correct to the end of round 22, 2026.

Lachlan Bramble (born 19 April 1998) is a professional Australian rules footballer who plays for the Western Bulldogs in the Australian Football League (AFL).

== Early career ==
Bramble joined the Williamstown Football Club after failing to get drafted from the Calder Cannons. After playing 11 games and kicking 4 goals for the VFL Seagulls in 2017 and 2018, he returned to his home club Sunbury in 2019 and played in the Ballarat Football League. In 2020 he returned to Williamstown but the Covid pandemic meant that football was cancelled for the year. He opted to go to Box Hill for the 2021 pre-season, where he impressed Hawthorn recruiters and was selected in the pre-season supplemental selection period.

== AFL career ==
Bramble debuted for Hawthorn in round 14 of the 2021 AFL season against Essendon at UTAS Stadium.

Bramble had an interrupted 2022 when he suffered a foot fracture during the pre-season.

Bramble made his debut for the Western Bulldogs in round 1 of the 2024 AFL season against Melbourne at the Melbourne Cricket Ground. He has practically played every game since in defence. He finish seventh in the club best and fairest.

== Statistics ==
Updated to the end of round 22, 2026.

Legend
G	Goals	K	Kicks	D	Disposals	T	Tackles
B	Behinds	H	Handballs	M	Marks

Season	Team	No.	Games	Totals							Averages (per game)							Votes
Season	Team	No.	Games	G	B	K	H	D	M	T	G	B	K	H	D	M	T	Votes
2021	Hawthorn	16	10	1	3	119	64	183	44	19	0.1	0.3	11.9	6.4	18.3	4.4	1.9	0
2022	Hawthorn	16	9	0	3	87	51	138	25	21	0.0	0.3	9.7	5.7	15.3	2.8	2.3	0
2023	Hawthorn	16	11	1	3	120	62	182	46	14	0.1	0.3	10.9	5.6	16.5	4.2	1.3	0
2024	Western Bulldogs	29	24	2	3	296	149	445	115	34	0.1	0.1	12.3	6.2	18.5	4.8	1.4	1
2025	Western Bulldogs	29	23	5	1	266	132	398	101	37	0.2	0.0	11.6	5.7	17.3	4.4	1.6	0
2026	Western Bulldogs	29	21	4	3	212	129	341	73	36	0.2	0.1	10.1	6.1	16.2	3.5	1.7	0
Career			98	13	16	1100	587	1687	404	161	0.1	0.2	11.2	6.0	17.2	4.1	1.6	1
