= Damon Greaves =

Australian rules footballer (born 2000)

Personal information
- Born: 25 April 2000 (age 26) Western Australia
- Height: 6 ft 1 in (185 cm)
- Weight: 185 lb (84 kg; 13 st 3 lb)
- Football career

No. 7 – Colorado Buffaloes
- Position: Punter
- Class: Junior

Career information
- College: Kansas (2023–2024); Colorado (2025–present)
- Stats at ESPN

Sport
Australian rules football career
Personal information
- Original team: East Perth
- Draft: No. 14, 2019 rookie draft
- Debut: Round 16, 2020, Hawthorn vs. St Kilda, at Metricon Stadium
- Position: Defender
Playing career^{1}
Years	Club	Games (Goals)
2019–2021	Hawthorn	10 (1)
- ^{1} Playing statistics correct to the end of 2021.

Damon Greaves (born 25 April 2000) is an Australian college football punter for the Colorado Buffaloes, having transferred from the Kansas Jayhawks. He previously played Australian rules footballer for the Hawthorn Football Club in the Australian Football League (AFL).

== Early career ==
A country kid at heart he played much of his junior football in Busselton before setting up to play for the East Perth Colts. Greaves played three games for Western Australia during the NAB AFL Under-18 Championships in 2018. A natural right footer, his father used to offer him 50 cents for every left foot kick he attempted thus made him capable with both feet. Greaves was picked in the 2019 rookie draft by Hawthorn.

== AFL career ==
Greaves' AFL career started by playing with the Hawthorn affiliate Box Hill Hawks, here under the tutelage of Hawthorn aligned coaches he spent his first year developing for the rigors of AFL football.

Greaves had to negotiate a difficult COVID-19 affected season. He showed promise during the pre-season games and with scratch matches against other AFL clubs. His patience was rewarded with a round 16 debut against St Kilda.

== Statistics ==
Statistics are correct to the end of 2021.

Legend
G	Goals	K	Kicks	D	Disposals	T	Tackles
B	Behinds	H	Handballs	M	Marks

Season	Team	No.	Games	Totals							Averages (per game)							Votes
Season	Team	No.	Games	G	B	K	H	D	M	T	G	B	K	H	D	M	T	Votes
2019	Hawthorn	44	0	—	—	—	—	—	—	—	—	—	—	—	—	—	—	0
2020 (Note: The 2020 season was played with 17 home-and-away matches per team (down from 22) and 16-minute quarters with time on (down from 20-minute quarters with time on) due to the impact of the COVID-19 pandemic.)	Hawthorn	44	3	0	0	35	17	52	17	5	0.0	0.0	11.7	5.7	17.3	5.7	1.7	0
2021	Hawthorn	30	7	1	0	48	26	74	16	12	0.1	0.0	6.9	3.7	10.6	2.3	1.7	0
Career			10	1	0	83	43	126	33	17	0.1	0.0	8.3	4.3	12.6	3.3	1.7	0
