= Denver Grainger-Barras =

Australian rules footballer (born 2002)

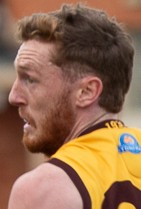
- Grainger-Barras in August 2024

Personal information
- Full name: Denver Grainger-Barras
- Born: 17 April 2002 (age 24)
- Original team: Swan Districts
- Draft: No. 6, 2020 national draft
- Debut: Round 15, 2021, Hawthorn vs. Greater Western Sydney, at Melbourne Cricket Ground
- Height: 194 cm (6 ft 4 in)
- Weight: 81 kg (179 lb)
- Position: Key Defender/Key Forward

Playing career
Years	Club	Games (Goals)
2021–2024	Hawthorn	28 (4)

Denver Grainger-Barras (born 17 April 2002) is a former professional Australian rules footballer who played for the Hawthorn Football Club in the Australian Football League (AFL).

== Early career ==
Grainger-Barras started at his local club Kalamunda, progressing through Auskick, before Swan Districts development coaches invited him to train with their club. Initially playing in the colts competition, he later stepped up into the seniors while still eligible for the underage competition.

He was injured in his first senior game, requiring shoulder surgery.

Named in the 2018 under 16s All Australian team, he represented Australia playing against New Zealand.

Selected as an All Australian in 2020 as an 18 year old, Grainger-Barras also played in all of Swan Districts senior games in 2020.

== AFL career ==
Grainger-Barras injured his knee in the last practice match of the 2021 pre-season. This delayed his debut until round 15. He made his debut against Greater Western Sydney on the Melbourne Cricket Ground. He was subbed off in his first game after suffering concussion.

He changed his number to 24 following his debut season.

Prior to the beginning of the 2022 season, Grainger-Barras signed a two-year contract extension with Hawthorn, to the end of 2024. He played 16 senior AFL matches in his second season in 2022.

Grainger-Barras was delisted by the Hawthorn Football Club at the end of the 2024 AFL season.

== Statistics ==
Updated to the end of 2024.

Legend
G	Goals	K	Kicks	D	Disposals	T	Tackles
B	Behinds	H	Handballs	M	Marks

Season	Team	No.	Games	Totals							Averages (per game)						
Season	Team	No.	Games	G	B	K	H	D	M	T	G	B	K	H	D	M	T
2021	Hawthorn	38	5	0	0	25	12	37	17	11	0.0	0.0	5.0	2.4	7.4	3.4	2.2
2022	Hawthorn	24	16	0	0	87	47	134	49	23	0.0	0.0	5.4	2.9	8.4	3.1	1.4
2023	Hawthorn	24	7	4	1	25	14	39	19	3	0.6	0.1	3.6	2.0	5.6	2.7	0.4
2024	Hawthorn	24	0	—	—	—	—	—	—	—	—	—	—	—	—	—	—
Career			28	4	1	137	73	210	85	52	0.1	0.0	4.9	2.6	7.5	3.0	1.9
