= Jack Saunders (Australian footballer) =

Australian rules football player

Personal information
- Full name: Jack Saunders
- Born: 11 February 2002 (age 24)
- Original team: Norwood (SANFL)
- Draft: No. 4, 2021 rookie draft
- Debut: Round 23, 2022, Hawthorn vs. Western Bulldogs, at York Park, Launceston
- Height: 182 cm (6 ft 0 in)
- Weight: 76 kg (168 lb)
- Position: Forward

Playing career^{1}
Years	Club	Games (Goals)
2021–2022	Hawthorn	1 (1)
- ^{1} Playing statistics correct to the end of the 2022 season.

Jack Saunders is a professional Australian Rules Football player who most recently played for the Hawthorn Football Club in the Australian Football League (AFL). He was recruited from Norwood in South Australia. He has also played for Box Hill Hawks in the Victorian Football League.

== Early life ==
Saunders played his junior football at Walkerville and the Unley jets, before moving to Norwood in the SANFL. He attended Prince Alfred College.

== AFL career ==
Jack made his debut in round 23, where Hawthorn played the Western Bulldogs in Launceston.

== Statistics ==
Updated to the end of the 2022 season.

Legend
G	Goals	K	Kicks	D	Disposals	T	Tackles
B	Behinds	H	Handballs	M	Marks

Season	Team	No.	Games	Totals							Averages (per game)							Votes
Season	Team	No.	Games	G	B	K	H	D	M	T	G	B	K	H	D	M	T	Votes
2021	Hawthorn	43	0	—	—	—	—	—	—	—	—	—	—	—	—	—	—	0
2022	Hawthorn	43	1	1	0	3	4	7	1	1	1.0	0.0	3.0	4.0	7.0	1.0	1.0	0
Career			1	1	0	3	4	7	1	1	1.0	0.0	3.0	4.0	7.0	1.0	1.0	0
