= Luke Breust =

Australian rules footballer (born 1990)

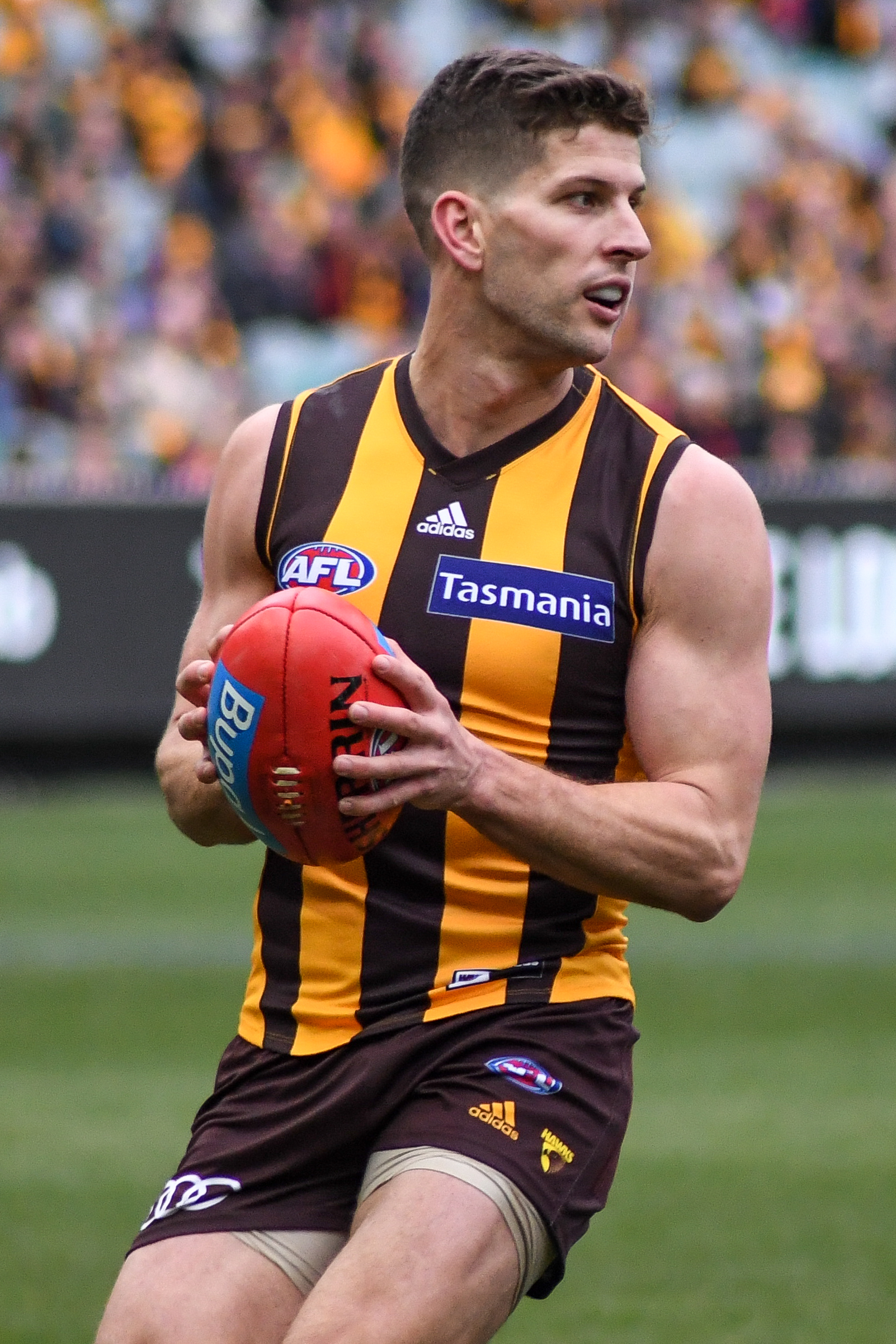
- Breust playing for Hawthorn in August 2018

Personal information
- Full name: Luke Breust
- Nickname: Punky
- Born: 11 November 1990 (age 35); Temora, New South Wales
- Original team: Temora (Farrer Football League)/NSW/ACT Rams/Sydney Swans Reserves
- Draft: No. 47, 2009 rookie draft
- Debut: Round 8, 2011, Hawthorn vs. St Kilda, at Melbourne Cricket Ground
- Height: 182 cm (6 ft 0 in)
- Weight: 82 kg (181 lb)
- Position: Forward

Playing career
Years	Club	Games (Goals)
2009–2025	Hawthorn	308 (553)

Representative team honours
Years	Team	Games (Goals)
2020	All Stars	1 (2)

International team honours
2014–2015	Australia	2 (0)

Career highlights
- 3× AFL premiership player: 2013, 2014, 2015; 2× All-Australian team: 2014, 2018; 5× Hawthorn leading goalkicker: 2018, 2019, 2021, 2022, 2023; 2× 22under22 team: 2012, 2013

Luke Breust (born 11 November 1990) is a retired Australian rules footballer who played for the Hawthorn Football Club in the Australian Football League (AFL) as a small forward. He was widely regarded as one of the competition's elite small forwards during his illustrious career, known for his forward craft, goal kicking accuracy and on-field leadership.

== Early career ==
Hailing from Temora, New South Wales, Breust played both rugby league and Australian Rules football as a junior but turned his focus to Australian Rules from age 14. Breust played football and basketball with Isaac Smith in Temora, before Smith moved to Wagga Wagga at the age of 13. They were both eventually drafted by Hawthorn, where they regularly played together in the club’s starting lineups and won multiple AFL premierships.

Before being drafted at the age of 18, Breust played as a member of the NSW/ACT Rams. He also played for the Sydney Swans reserves team.

He was drafted by Hawthorn with selection 47 in the 2009 AFL Rookie Draft in December 2008. Breust fractured his left tibia during 2008, but after recovering from that injury he received an invitation to trial with the Hawks and was then selected in the draft.

== AFL career ==
In Round 8 of the 2011 AFL season, Breust made his debut against St Kilda after performing well for Hawthorn's affiliate side in the Victorian Football League, Box Hill. He kicked 2 goals after coming on as a substitute. In Round 15 after a 2-goal, 16-possession game against Collingwood, he was nominated for the 2011 AFL Rising Star Award.

Breust improved more during the 2012 AFL season, particularly with his five-goal effort in Hawthorn's eight-goal win over Collingwood. He played predominantly as a forward, but had short bursts in the midfield throughout the year. Breust played in Hawthorn's losing Grand Final team. At the end of the year, he placed fourth in the Peter Crimmins Medal behind winner Sam Mitchell.

In 2013, Breust kicked a goal in the last quarter of the AFL Grand Final against the Fremantle Dockers to win his first AFL Premiership.

In 2014, Breust began a streak of 29 consecutive goals without scoring a behind, tying with the record set by Tony Lockett in the 1995 season. The streak began during the last quarter of Round 5 against the Geelong Cats and was broken in Round 17 against the Adelaide Crows.

In Round 21, 2017, Breust kicked his 300th career goal in a 27-point victory over North Melbourne. Breust was widely regarded as having a below average 2017 season, kicking only 33 goals, his second-lowest annual tally to that date, just surpassing the 30 goals in his debut season.

Breust enjoyed a return to form in the 2018 season, with him kicking 53 goals, being a member of the All-Australian team for the second time, and finishing sixth in the Peter Crimmins Medal tally.

Breust had a below-average 2019. Without tall marking targets around them, his combination in the forward line with Jack Gunston was seen as being rather ineffective, with the pair kicking just 60 goals between them, as opposed to 105 the previous season.

On 18 February 2023, Breust was announced as co-vice captain of Hawthorn Football Club alongside fellow small forward Dylan Moore to support newly announced captain James Sicily.

Breust kicked his 500th career goal in Round 12, 2023 against Port Adelaide.

On 14 August 2025, Luke announced his retirement from the AFL at the end of the season after 14 seasons.

== Statistics ==
Legend
G	Goals	K	Kicks	D	Disposals	T	Tackles
B	Behinds	H	Handballs	M	Marks
#	Played in that season's premiership team

Season	Team	No.	Games	Totals							Averages (per game)							Votes
Season	Team	No.	Games	G	B	K	H	D	M	T	G	B	K	H	D	M	T	Votes
2009	Hawthorn	47	0	—	—	—	—	—	—	—	—	—	—	—	—	—	—	0
2010	Hawthorn	47	0	—	—	—	—	—	—	—	—	—	—	—	—	—	—	0
2011	Hawthorn	47	17	30	15	116	91	207	56	50	1.8	0.9	6.8	5.4	12.2	3.3	2.9	2
2012	Hawthorn	22	24	45	25	175	199	374	77	113	1.9	1.0	7.3	8.3	15.6	3.2	4.7	3
2013^{#}	Hawthorn	22	25	40	30	192	173	365	91	110	1.6	1.2	7.7	6.9	14.6	3.6	4.4	2
2014^{#}	Hawthorn	22	25	57	12	199	183	382	80	85	2.3	0.5	8.0	7.3	15.3	3.2	3.4	5
2015^{#}	Hawthorn	22	25	52	19	196	171	367	94	96	2.1	0.8	7.8	6.8	14.7	3.8	3.8	3
2016	Hawthorn	22	24	47	27	215	162	377	85	94	2.0	1.1	9.0	6.8	15.7	3.5	3.9	1
2017	Hawthorn	22	21	33	17	176	125	301	69	85	1.6	0.8	8.4	6.0	14.3	3.3	4.0	0
2018	Hawthorn	22	24	54	24	221	157	378	99	99	2.3	1.0	9.2	6.5	15.8	4.1	4.1	7
2019	Hawthorn	22	22	34	17	165	137	302	61	85	1.5	0.8	7.5	6.2	13.7	2.8	3.9	2
2020 (Note: The 2020 season was played with 17 home-and-away matches per team (down from 22) and 16-minute quarters with time on (down from 20-minute quarters with time on) due to the impact of the COVID-19 pandemic.)	Hawthorn	22	13	16	6	77	65	142	24	51	1.2	0.5	5.9	5.0	10.9	1.8	3.9	0
2021	Hawthorn	22	19	33	11	122	117	239	47	62	1.7	0.6	6.4	6.2	12.6	2.5	3.3	0
2022	Hawthorn	22	21	40	19	156	79	235	47	51	1.9	0.9	7.4	3.8	11.2	2.2	2.4	3
2023	Hawthorn	22	21	47	23	144	81	225	77	44	2.2	1.1	6.9	3.9	10.7	3.7	2.1	1
2024	Hawthorn	22	19	21	8	89	53	142	40	25	1.1	0.4	4.7	2.8	7.5	2.1	1.3	0
2025	Hawthorn	22	8	4	3	32	22	54	15	11	0.5	0.4	4.0	2.8	6.8	1.9	1.4	0
Career			308	553	256	2275	1815	4090	962	1061	1.8	0.8	7.4	5.9	13.3	3.1	3.4	29

== Honours and achievements ==
Team

- 3× AFL premiership player (Hawthorn): 2013, 2014, 2015
- 2× Minor premiership (Hawthorn): 2012, 2013
- 3× McClelland Trophy (Hawthorn): 2012, 2013, 2024

Individual

- 2× All-Australian team: 2014, 2018
- 5× Hawthorn leading goalkicker: 2018, 2019, 2021, 2022, 2023
- 2× 22under22 team: 2012, 2013
- AFL Rising Star nominee: 2011
- 2× Australian international rules football team: 2014, 2015
- All-Stars team: 2020

== Personal life ==
Breust's wife is Anthea née Pellow, a primary school teacher. He is related to former NRL players Trent Barrett and Angus Crichton.
