= Ned Reeves =

Australian rules footballer (born 1998)

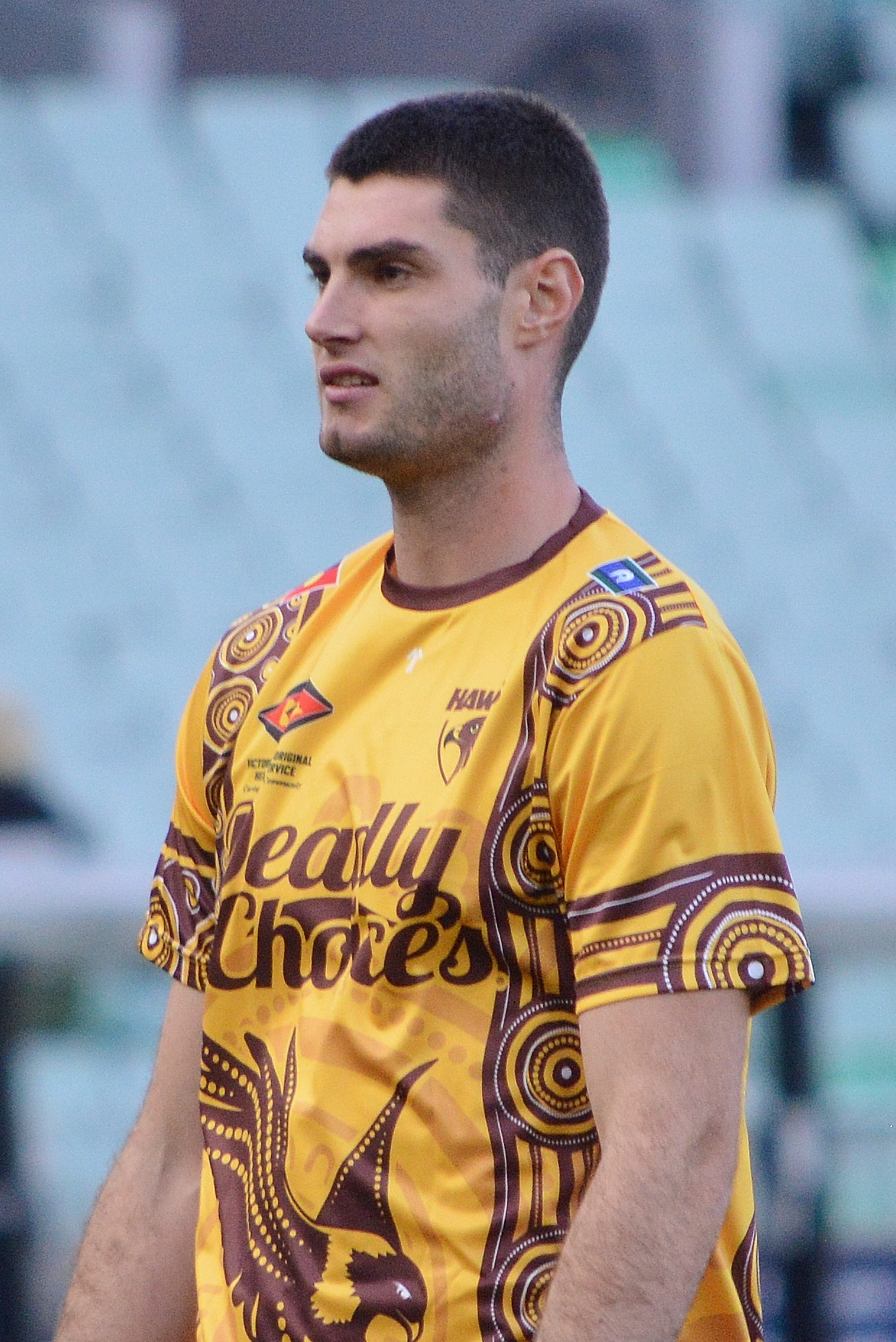
- Reeves in May 2026

Personal information
- Born: 31 October 1998 (age 28)
- Original teams: St Kevin's Old Boys (VAFA); Oakleigh Chargers (TAC Cup)
- Draft: 2019 pre-season supplementary selection period
- Debut: Round 10, 2021, Hawthorn vs. Carlton, at Melbourne Cricket Ground
- Height: 210 cm (6 ft 11 in)
- Weight: 103 kg (227 lb)
- Position: Ruckman

Club information
- Current club: Hawthorn
- Number: 7

Playing career^{1}
Years	Club	Games (Goals)
2019–	Hawthorn	58 (16)
- ^{1} Playing statistics correct to the end of 2026.

Career highlights
- VFL premiership player: 2026; VFL Team of the Year: 2025

Ned Reeves (born 31 October 1998) is a professional Australian rules footballer with the Hawthorn Football Club in the Australian Football League (AFL).

== Early career ==
Reeves was always a tall boy for his age. Growing up on the Surf Coast in Fairhaven, Ned played his junior football with the Aireys Inlet Eels in the Football Geelong Junior Competition and the Anglesea FNC until he moved to Melbourne at age 15. Ned attended Aireys Inlet primary school and St Josephs College, Geelong before St Kevins College, Toorak. He was the tallest boy in the NAB Under 18 League, playing for Oakleigh Chargers, but he wasn't drafted. He played the 2018 year in the VAFA for St Kevins Old Boys. He played in the Premier League premiership team. His father is the Hawthorn CEO, Justin Reeves, and the club invited him for pre-season training. Hawthorn could see potential in him so he was selected by Hawthorn in the pre-season supplementary selection period.

== AFL career ==
Reeves' AFL career started by playing with the Hawthorn affiliate Box Hill Hawks in the Victorian Football League (VFL). In 2021 he was considered one of the most in-form ruckmen in the VFL competition and made his AFL debut against Carlton at the MCG, becoming Hawthorn's tallest ever player. Reeves started out as understudy to Ben McEvoy, often selected as a forward and relieving in the ruck later in the game. The retirement of McEvoy at the end of 2022 promoted him into being the number one ruck for Hawthorn. The arrival of Lloyd Meek from Fremantle restricted his chances during 2024 and 2025. The rule changes for the 2026 season allowed both ruckmen to share the duties during the game.

== Statistics ==
Updated to the end of 2026.

Legend
G	Goals	K	Kicks	D	Disposals	T	Tackles
B	Behinds	H	Handballs	M	Marks	H/O	Hit-outs

Season	Team	No.	Games	Totals								Averages (per game)								Votes
Season	Team	No.	Games	G	B	K	H	D	M	T	H/O	G	B	K	H	D	M	T	H/O	Votes
2019	Hawthorn	43	0	—	—	—	—	—	—	—	—	—	—	—	—	—	—	—	—	0
2020	Hawthorn	43	0	—	—	—	—	—	—	—	—	—	—	—	—	—	—	—	—	0
2021	Hawthorn	37	5	1	0	19	29	48	8	20	131	0.2	0.0	3.8	5.8	9.6	1.6	4.0	26.2	0
2022	Hawthorn	37	12	7	1	53	36	89	17	29	323	0.6	0.1	4.4	3.0	7.4	1.4	2.4	26.9	0
2023	Hawthorn	7	21	2	2	70	100	170	31	57	592	0.1	0.1	3.3	4.8	8.1	1.5	2.7	28.2	0
2024	Hawthorn	7	4	1	0	13	20	33	7	9	91	0.3	0.0	3.3	5.0	8.3	1.8	2.3	22.8	0
2025	Hawthorn	7	1	0	0	4	2	6	0	3	34	0.0	0.0	4.0	2.0	6.0	0.0	3.0	34.0	0
2026	Hawthorn	7	15	5	4	63	49	112	12	35	362	0.3	0.3	4.2	3.3	7.5	0.8	2.3	24.1	0
Career			58	16	7	222	236	458	75	153	1533	0.3	0.1	3.8	4.1	7.9	1.3	2.6	26.4	0

== Honours and achievements ==
Team

- McClelland Trophy (Hawthorn): 2024
- VFL premiership player (Box Hill): 2026

Individual

- VFL Team of the Year: 2025
