= Ben McEvoy =

Australian rules footballer (born 1989)

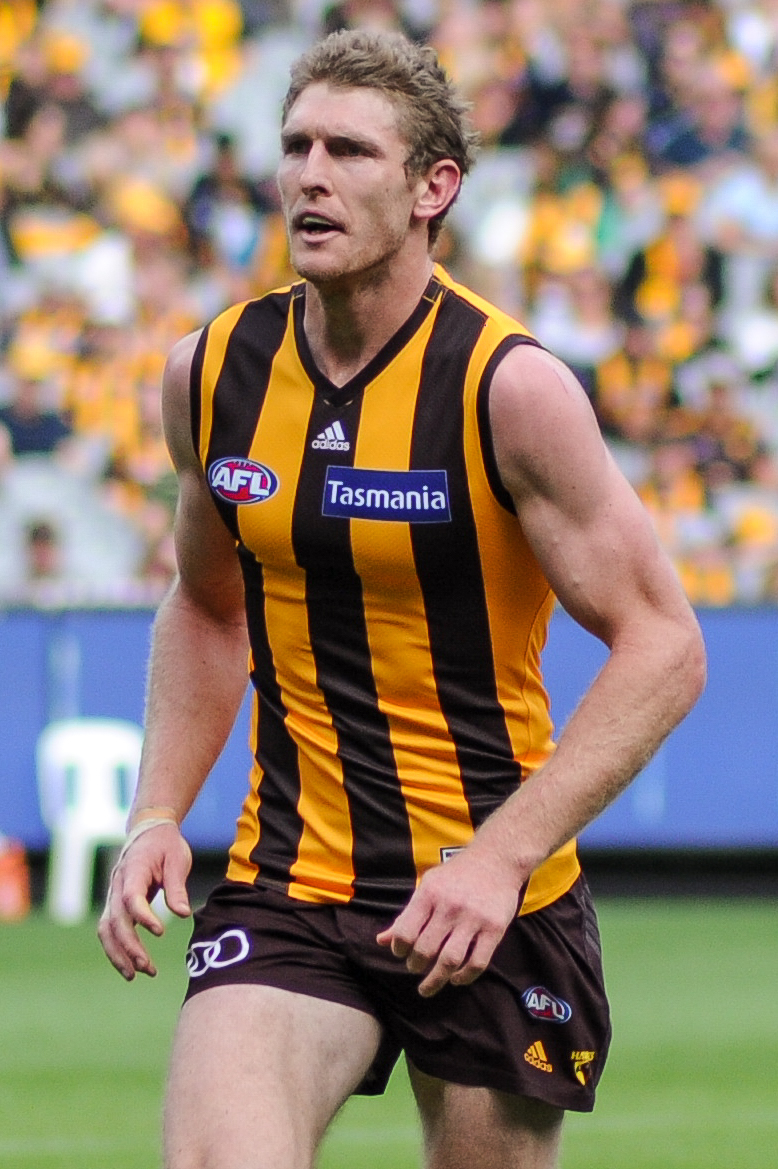
- McEvoy playing for Hawthorn in April 2017

Personal information
- Full name: Ben McEvoy
- Nickname: Big Boy
- Born: 11 July 1989 (age 37); Colbinabbin
- Original team: Murray Bushrangers (TAC Cup)
- Draft: No. 9, 2007 national draft
- Debut: Round 13, 2008, St Kilda vs. Fremantle, at Telstra Dome
- Height: 200 cm (6 ft 7 in)
- Weight: 101 kg (223 lb)
- Positions: Ruckman, Defender

Playing career^{1}
Years	Club	Games (Goals)
2008–2013	St Kilda	91 (27)
2014–2022	Hawthorn	161 (79)
Total		252 (106)
- ^{1} Playing statistics correct to the end of the 2022 season.

Career highlights
- 2× AFL premiership player: 2014, 2015; Hawthorn captain: 2021–2022

Ben McEvoy (born 11 July 1989) is a former professional Australian rules footballer who played for the St Kilda Football Club and Hawthorn Football Club in the Australian Football League (AFL).

== Early career ==
McEvoy is an Australian Institute of Sport and AFL Academy graduate. He was an All-Australian selection in the NAB AFL Under 18 championships, averaging seven marks per game as a ruck/forward. He played junior football with Dederang-Mt Beauty and U18 football with the Murray Bushrangers in the TAC Cup. In 2007 he captained the Murray Bushrangers and won the best and fairest award.

== AFL career ==
=== St Kilda ===
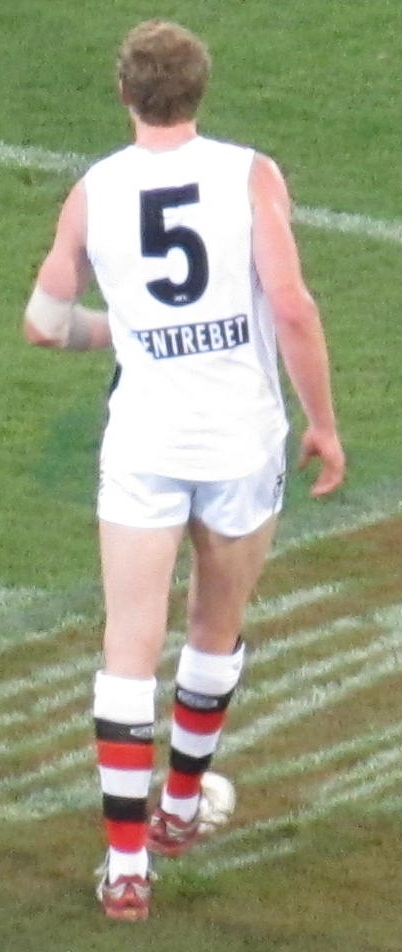
Ben McEvoy playing for St Kilda in 2011.

McEvoy was recruited by St Kilda with the ninth selection in the 2007 AFL draft from the Murray Bushrangers. With an injury to Michael Gardiner he made his debut for St Kilda against Fremantle in 2008. This was his only game for that year and he has been in and out of the St Kilda senior side for the next two years, wearing the number 5 jumper. In that time he was consistently in the best players for St Kilda's VFL affiliate team, Casey Scorpions.

=== 2010 season ===
Hawthorn and St Kilda played out a draw in Round 17 after McEvoy kicked a goal with 12 seconds remaining. McEvoy went up uncontested in a ball-up and then dribbled through the goal from 12m out with no Hawthorn player in the goalsquare. After playing strongly into and through the 2010 finals series, including eight consecutive games and 18 for the season, McEvoy was dropped for the Grand Final. With injury to first ruck Michael Gardiner, McEvoy regained his place in the side for the grand final replay in which St Kilda were defeated by Collingwood.

=== 2011 season ===
The 2011 season was widely considered McEvoy's breakout season. After a strong preseason, McEvoy's fitness and preparation was lauded as outstanding by those close to the club. He worked closely with Steven King before and during the season to improve his technical skill to assume the lead ruck role for the club.

=== 2012 season ===
He was St Kilda's number one ruckman again in 2012, but had mid season surgery to his knee after he injured it at training. He missed six games and after returning played every game to season's end. He liked to spend time dropping back into defence to take strong contested marks.

=== 2013 season ===
McEvoy played all 22 games for St Kilda in season 2013 and held down the number one ruck role.

=== Hawthorn ===
During the 2013 trade period, McEvoy was traded by St Kilda to Hawthorn in exchange for young midfielder Shane Savage and Hawthorn's first round pick. The Saints had decided to rebuild their playing list by trading players for early draft picks. McEvoy was holidaying in Cambodia when he was contacted to agree to the trade. The Hawks were hopeful at the time that McEvoy could hold down the number one ruck position after premiership ruckman Max Bailey announced his retirement post-season.

After being in and out of the side during the 2014 season, McEvoy featured in the Hawthorn side which defeated Sydney by 63 points to win the club's 12th premiership. He also featured in the 2015 Hawthorn Premiership side where the Hawks defeated the West Coast Eagles to claim their third straight premiership.

On 14 August 2017 McEvoy signed a two-year contract extension keeping him at Hawthorn until the end of 2019.

Following a player vote, McEvoy was named Hawthorn's 37th VFL/AFL captain for the 2021 season replacing Ben Stratton who retired following the 2020 season. McEvoy was the first player since Keith Shea in 1945 to become Hawthorn captain after playing for another club. McEvoy also became the first ruckman to captain Hawthorn since Don Scott in 1980.

== Statistics ==
Legend
G	Goals	K	Kicks	D	Disposals	T	Tackles
B	Behinds	H	Handballs	M	Marks	H/O	Hit-outs
#	Played in that season's premiership team

Season	Team	No.	Games	Totals								Averages (per game)								Votes
Season	Team	No.	Games	G	B	K	H	D	M	T	H/O	G	B	K	H	D	M	T	H/O	Votes
2008	St Kilda	5	1	0	1	5	1	6	4	1	0	0.0	1.0	5.0	1.0	6.0	4.0	1.0	0.0	0
2009	St Kilda	5	11	3	2	32	49	81	30	20	94	0.3	0.2	2.9	4.5	7.4	2.7	1.8	8.5	0
2010	St Kilda	5	19	7	4	71	128	199	75	50	205	0.4	0.2	3.7	6.7	10.5	3.9	2.6	10.8	0
2011	St Kilda	5	22	4	5	121	199	320	118	85	497	0.2	0.2	5.5	9.0	14.5	5.4	3.9	22.6	1
2012	St Kilda	5	16	7	0	95	101	196	85	60	405	0.4	0.0	5.9	6.3	12.3	5.3	3.8	25.3	0
2013	St Kilda	5	22	6	2	116	137	253	103	63	449	0.3	0.1	5.3	6.2	11.5	4.7	2.9	20.4	1
2014^{#}	Hawthorn	7	13	6	2	55	112	167	57	34	271	0.5	0.2	4.2	8.6	12.8	4.4	2.6	20.8	0
2015^{#}	Hawthorn	7	19	12	1	83	127	210	80	62	371	0.6	0.1	4.4	6.7	11.1	4.2	3.3	19.5	0
2016	Hawthorn	7	23	11	6	86	147	233	79	61	443	0.5	0.3	3.7	6.4	10.1	3.4	2.7	19.3	0
2017	Hawthorn	7	22	14	1	110	164	274	88	76	712	0.6	0.0	5.0	7.5	12.5	4.0	3.5	32.4	5
2018	Hawthorn	7	19	6	6	91	144	235	69	61	583	0.3	0.3	4.8	7.6	12.4	3.6	3.2	30.7	8
2019	Hawthorn	7	19	8	2	101	135	236	91	46	538	0.4	0.1	5.3	7.1	12.4	4.8	2.4	28.3	4
2020 (Note: The 2020 season was played with 17 home-and-away matches per team (down from 22) and 16-minute quarters with time on (down from 20-minute quarters with time on) due to the impact of the COVID-19 pandemic.)	Hawthorn	7	16	4	1	69	72	141	51	31	161	0.3	0.1	4.3	4.5	8.8	3.2	1.9	10.1	0
2021	Hawthorn	7	22	12	8	135	140	275	111	78	370	0.5	0.4	6.1	6.4	12.5	5.0	3.5	16.8	0
2022	Hawthorn	7	8	6	1	36	57	93	17	26	178	0.8	0.1	4.5	7.1	11.6	2.1	3.3	22.3	0
Career			252	106	42	1206	1713	2919	1058	754	5277	0.4	0.2	4.8	6.8	11.6	4.2	3.0	20.9	19

== Honours and achievements ==
Team

- 2× AFL premiership player (Hawthorn): 2014, 2015
- Minor premiership (St Kilda): 2009
- Minor premiership (Box Hill): 2015

Individual

- Hawthorn captain: 2021–2022
- Hawthorn best clubman: 2021
- Hawthorn life member
- Under 18 All-Australian team: 2007

== Personal life ==
McEvoy has a younger brother Peter, who played for the Box Hill Hawks Football Club development team, and lead the Development League in goalkicking in 2014, booting 59 goals. The two brothers played alongside each other in the 2014 qualifying final against Port Melbourne, with the brothers combining for 6 goals in a 24-point victory to the Hawks, the same game being Peter's debut VFL match.
