= 2020 Hawthorn Football Club season =

96th season in the Australian Football League

Hawthorn Football Club
2020 season
- President: Jeff Kennett
- Coach: Alastair Clarkson
- Captain: Ben Stratton
- Home ground: Melbourne Cricket Ground (Round 1); Marvel Stadium (Round 4); Giants Stadium (Round 7); Adelaide Oval (Rounds 14, 15, 17 and 18)
- Record: 5–12 (15th)
- Best and Fairest: Jack Gunston
- Leading goalkicker: Jack Gunston (31)

The 2020 Hawthorn Football Club season was the club's 96th season in the Australian Football League and 119th overall, the 21st season playing home games at the Melbourne Cricket Ground, the 20th season playing home games at the University of Tasmania Stadium, the 16th season under head coach Alastair Clarkson, and the 2nd season with Ben Stratton as club captain. With Jarryd Roughead and Grant Birchall departing this season was the first to not have any player from Hawthorn's 2008 premiership team on the list.

On 16 March 2020, AFL CEO Gillon McLachlan announced that the season would be shortened to 17 games due to the COVID-19 pandemic. During Hawthorn's round 1 match with the Brisbane Lions, it was announced that the season would be suspended following the conclusion of the round, with the suspension to last until 31 May 2020. The season recommenced on 11 June 2020. Due to COVID-19, Hawthorn would only play two matches at the Melbourne Cricket Ground, and no matches at the University of Tasmania Stadium. From round 13 until the end of the season, the Hawks would base themselves in the Barossa Valley in South Australia, playing home games at the Adelaide Oval.

A 10–point loss to Port Adelaide in round 13 meant that Hawthorn would fail to win 10 games in a season since 2009.

Hawthorn finished in fifteenth–place with a 5–12 record. Meaning for the first time since 2006 the club would fail to qualify for finals in consecutive seasons. This was also the first time since 2005, Hawthorn would finish in the bottom four.

== Club summary ==
The 2020 AFL season was the 124th season of the VFL/AFL competition since its inception in 1897; having entered the competition in 1925, it was the 96th season contested by the Hawthorn Football Club. Tasmania and iiNet continued as the club's two major sponsors, as they have done since 2006 and 2013 respectively, while Adidas continued to manufacture the club's on-and-off field apparel, as they have done since 2013. Hawthorn continued its alignment with the Box Hill Hawks Football Club in the Victorian Football League, however due to COVID-19, the VFL season was cancelled.

== Senior personnel ==
On 26 August 2019, the club announced that assistant coach Darren Glass would be leaving the club to join West Coast as the club's list manager. A couple of days later it was announced that former assistant coach and Carlton coach, Brendon Bolton would return to the club as director of coaching. On 23 May 2020, Due to the COVID-19 pandemic, The club was forced to stand down all but 25 staff members. This included head of development and learning Damian Carroll, VFL coach Max Bailey, VFLW coach Bec Goddard and development coaches Torin Baker, Marco Bello and Brett Deledio.

== Playing list changes ==
=== Trades ===
11 October 2019	To Hawthorn Sam Frost; Pick 42, 2019 AFL draft Pick 61, 2019 AFL draft 4th round pick, 2020 AFL draft	To Melbourne Pick 50, 2019 AFL draft 2nd round pick, 2020 AFL draft
15 October 2019	To Hawthorn Jonathon Patton	To Greater Western Sydney 4th round pick, 2020 AFL draft (via Melbourne)
16 October 2019	To Hawthorn Pick 54, 2019 AFL draft (via West Coast); Pick 63, 2019 AFL draft (via Sydney)	To Carlton Marc Pittonet; Pick 61, 2019 AFL draft (via Melbourne)
20 November 2019	To Hawthorn Pick 50, 2019 AFL draft Pick 73, 2019 AFL draft 2nd round pick, 2020 AFL draft	To North Melbourne Pick 30, 2019 AFL draft
28 November 2019	To Hawthorn 3rd round pick, 2020 AFL draft (via Essendon)	To Collingwood Pick 43, 2019 AFL draft
28 November 2019	To Hawthorn 4th round pick, 2020 AFL draft	To Western Bulldogs Pick 62, 2019 AFL draft

=== Free agency ===
==== Additions ====
Date	Player	F/A Type	Former Club	Deal	Compensation	Ref
29 November 2019	Michael Hartley	PSD	Essendon	N/A	None	
29 November 2019	Harry Pepper	CB	N/A	N/A	None	
6 March 2020	Keegan Brooksby	SSP	West Coast	1-year deal	none	

==== Departures ====
Date	Player	F/A Type	New Club	Deal	Compensation	Ref
10 October 2019	Grant Birchall	Unrestricted	Brisbane Lions	Signed 1-year deal	None	

=== Draft ===
==== AFL draft ====
Round	Overall pick	Player	Recruited from	ref
1	13	Will Day	West Adelaide	
2	29	Finn Maginness	Sandringham Dragons	
4	57	Josh Morris	Woodville-West Torrens	

==== Rookie draft ====
Round	Overall pick	Player	Recruited from	ref
1	9	Emerson Jeka	Western Jets	

=== Retirements and delistings ===
Date	Player	2020 team	Reason	Ref
29 October 2018	Will Langford	—N/a	Retired	
12 August 2019	Jarryd Roughead	—N/a	Retired	
17 October 2019	Kaiden Brand	Sydney	Delisted	
17 October 2019	Teia Miles	—N/a	Delisted	
17 October 2019	David Mirra	—N/a	Delisted	
17 October 2019	Tim Mohr	—N/a	Retired	
18 October 2019	Ryan Schoenmakers	—N/a	Retired	

== 2020 player squad ==
2020 Hawthorn Football Club squad
Senior list		Rookie list	Coaching staff
1 Harry Morrison; 2 Mitchell Lewis; 3 Tom Mitchell (VC); 4 Jarman Impey; 5 James Worpel; 6 James Sicily; 7 Ben McEvoy; 8 Sam Frost; 9 Shaun Burgoyne; 10 Jaeger O'Meara (VC); 11 Conor Nash; 12 James Frawley; 13 Conor Glass; 14 Jack Scrimshaw; 15 Blake Hardwick; 16 Isaac Smith; 17 Daniel Howe; 18 Jonathon Ceglar; 19 Jack Gunston	20 Chad Wingard; 21 Tom Scully; 22 Luke Breust; 23 Tim O'Brien; 24 Ben Stratton (C); 25 Jonathon Patton; 26 Liam Shiels; 27 Michael Hartley; 28 Paul Puopolo; 30 Will Day; 31 Ricky Henderson; 32 Finn Maginness; 33 Mathew Walker; 34 Jacob Koschitzke; 35 Josh Morris; 36 Dylan Moore; 37 Jackson Ross; 41 Oliver Hanrahan; 46 James Cousins	29 Changkuoth Jiath (B); 38 Darren Minchington; 39 Emerson Jeka; 40 Harry Jones; 42 Harry Pepper (B); 43 Ned Reeves; 44 Damon Greaves; 45 Will Golds; 47 Keegan Brooksby	Head coach: Alastair Clarkson; Assistant coaches: Scott Burns; Sam Mitchell; Damian Monkhorst; Chris Newman; Adem Yze; Legend: (c) Captain(s); (vc) Vice-captain(s); Injured; Upgraded rookie(s); (ret) Retired; (B) Category B rookie; (FA) Free agent; Updated: 19 September 2020; Source(s): HFC Website; Coaches

== Marsh Community series ==
Rd	Date and local time	Opponent	Scores (Hawthorn's scores indicated in bold)			Venue	Report
Rd	Date and local time	Opponent	Home	Away	Result	Venue	Report
1	Thursday, 20 February (7:10 pm)	St Kilda	17.9 (111)	**13.12 (90)**	Lost by 21 points	RSEA Park	Report
2	Friday, 6 March (7:40 pm)	Melbourne	**6.13 (49)**	12.9 (81)	Lost by 32 points	University of Tasmania Stadium	Report

== Home & Away season ==
Rd	Date and local time	Opponent	Scores (Hawthorn's scores indicated in bold)			Venue	Record	Report
Rd	Date and local time	Opponent	Home	Away	Result	Venue	Record	Report
1	Sunday, 22 March (3:20 pm)	Brisbane Lions	**14.6 (90)**	9.8 (62)	Won by 28 points	Melbourne Cricket Ground	1–0	Report
2	Friday, 12 June (7:50 pm)	Geelong	17.6 (108)	**7.5 (47)**	Lost by 61 points	GMHBA Stadium	1–1	Report
3	Thursday, 18 June (7:40 pm)	Richmond	5.9 (39)	**11.5 (71)**	Won by 32 points	Melbourne Cricket Ground	2–1	Report
4	Sunday, 28 June (6:10 pm)	North Melbourne	**8.10 (58)**	8.6 (54)	Won by 4 points	Marvel Stadium	3–1	Report
5	Sunday, 5 July (6:10 pm)	Greater Western Sydney	13.5 (83)	**7.7 (49)**	Lost by 34 points	GIANTS Stadium	3–2	Report
6	Friday, 10 July (7:50 pm)	Collingwood	8.11 (59)	**3.9 (27)**	Lost by 32 points	GIANTS Stadium	3–3	Report
7	Sunday, 19 July (3:35 pm)	Melbourne	**7.6 (48)**	14.7 (91)	Lost by 43 points	GIANTS Stadium	3–4	Report
8	Saturday, 25 July (3:35 pm)	Sydney	9.6 (60)	**7.11 (53)**	Lost by 7 points	Sydney Cricket Ground	3–5	Report
9	Friday, 31 July (3:40 pm)	Carlton	9.4 (58)	**14.5 (89)**	Won by 31 points	Optus Stadium	4–5	Report
10	Bye							
11	Monday, 10 August (6:40 pm)	Fremantle	7.6 (48)	**4.8 (32)**	Lost by 16 points	Optus Stadium	4–6	Report
12	Sunday, 16 August (4:10 pm)	West Coast	12.9 (81)	**7.7 (49)**	Lost by 32 points	Optus Stadium	4–7	Report
13	Saturday, 22 August (4:05 pm)	Port Adelaide	9.14 (68)	**9.4 (58)**	Lost by 10 points	Adelaide Oval	4–8	Report
14	Thursday, 27 August (4:10 pm)	Essendon	**10.11 (71)**	13.9 (87)	Lost by 16 points	Adelaide Oval	4–9	Report
15	Tuesday, 1 September (5:10 pm)	Adelaide	**7.6 (48)**	12.11 (83)	Lost by 35 points	Adelaide Oval	4–10	Report
16	Sunday, 6 September (1:05 pm)	St Kilda	11.14 (80)	**9.12 (66)**	Lost by 14 points	Metricon Stadium	4–11	Report
17	Sunday, 13 September (3:05 pm)	Western Bulldogs	**6.4 (40)**	11.10 (76)	Lost by 36 points	Adelaide Oval	4–12	Report
18	Sunday, 20 September (12:35 pm)	Gold Coast	**17.6 (108)**	8.9 (57)	Won by 51 points	Adelaide Oval	5–12	Report

=== Ladder ===
Pos	Team	Pld	W	L	D	PF	PA	PP	Pts	Qualification
1	Port Adelaide	17	14	3	0	1185	869	136.4	56	Finals series
2	Brisbane Lions	17	14	3	0	1184	948	124.9	56	Finals series
3	Richmond (P)	17	12	4	1	1135	874	129.9	50	Finals series
4	Geelong	17	12	5	0	1233	901	136.8	48	Finals series
5	West Coast	17	12	5	0	1095	936	117.0	48	Finals series
6	St Kilda	17	10	7	0	1159	997	116.2	40	Finals series
7	Western Bulldogs	17	10	7	0	1103	1034	106.7	40	Finals series
8	Collingwood	17	9	7	1	965	881	109.5	38	Finals series
9	Melbourne	17	9	8	0	1063	986	107.8	36	
10	Greater Western Sydney	17	8	9	0	1007	1053	95.6	32	
11	Carlton	17	7	10	0	1017	1078	94.3	28	
12	Fremantle	17	7	10	0	866	924	93.7	28	
13	Essendon	17	6	10	1	938	1185	79.2	26	
14	Gold Coast	17	5	11	1	996	1099	90.6	22	
**15**	Hawthorn	**17**	**5**	**12**	**0**	**1004**	**1194**	**84.1**	20	
16	Sydney	17	5	12	0	890	1077	82.6	20	
17	North Melbourne	17	3	14	0	858	1205	71.2	12	
18	Adelaide	17	3	14	0	826	1283	64.4	12	

Source: AFL
Rules for classification: 1) points; 2) percentage; 3) number of points for.
(P) Premiers

== Awards, records and milestones ==
=== Awards ===
Club Awards

- Peter Crimmins Medal: Jack Gunston
- Most consistent player: Jack Gunston
- Most improved player: Jack Scrimshaw
- Best clubman: Paul Puopolo
- Best first year player (debut season): Will Day

=== Records ===
==== Club records ====
- Most tackles: 1,288 – Liam Shiels
- Most goal assists: 199 – Luke Breust
- Most games coached: 368 – Alastair Clarkson
- Most victories coached: 221 – Alastair Clarkson
- Most home and away games coached: 342 – Alastair Clarkson
- Most home and away victories coached: 205 – Alastair Clarkson

=== Milestones ===
Round 1

- Tim O'Brien – 50th AFL goal.
- Sam Frost – Hawthorn debut.
- Jonathon Patton – Hawthorn debut.
- Jonathon Patton – 1st goal for Hawthorn.

Round 3

- Jack Gunston – 350th goal for Hawthorn.
- Chad Wingard – 250th AFL goal.
- Jaeger O'Meara – 50th game for Hawthorn.

Round 4

- Tom Mitchell – 50th game for Hawthorn.

Round 5

- Harrison Jones – AFL debut.

Round 6

- Will Day – AFL debut.
- Josh Morris – AFL debut.

Round 7

- Darren Minchington – Hawthorn debut.
- Josh Morris – 1st AFL goal.

Round 8

- Jack Gunston – 200th AFL game.
- Keegan Brooksby – Hawthorn debut.

Round 9

- Luke Breust – 400th AFL goal.
- Sam Frost – 100th AFL game.
- Jaeger O'Meara – 100th AFL game.
- Will Day – 1st AFL goal.

Round 13

- Shaun Burgoyne – 300th AFL goal.
- Ben Stratton – 200th AFL game.
- Michael Hartley – Hawthorn debut.

Round 14

- Darren Minchington – 1st goal for Hawthorn.

Round 16

- Damon Greaves – AFL debut.

Round 17

- Finn Maginness – AFL debut.

Round 18

- James Frawley – 100th game for Hawthorn.
