= 2018 Hawthorn Football Club season =

94th season in the Australian Football League

Hawthorn Football Club
2018 season
- President: Jeff Kennett
- Coach: Alastair Clarkson
- Captain: Jarryd Roughead
- Home grounds: Melbourne Cricket Ground; University of Tasmania Stadium
- Record: 15–7 (4th)
- Finals Series: Semi-final (lost to Melbourne 71–104)
- Best and Fairest: Tom Mitchell
- Leading goalkicker: Luke Breust (54)
- Highest home attendance: 90,152 (Semi-final vs. Melbourne)
- Lowest home attendance: 9,007 (Round 14 vs. Gold Coast)
- Average home attendance: 38,035

The 2018 season was the Hawthorn Football Club's 94th season in the Australian Football League and 117th overall, the 19th season playing home games at the Melbourne Cricket Ground, the 18th season playing home games at the University of Tasmania Stadium, the 14th season under head coach Alastair Clarkson, and the 2nd season with Jarryd Roughead as club captain. This was also the first season without either Luke Hodge or Sam Mitchell on the list since 2001.

Hawthorn improved on their record from 2017, finishing in fourth place with a 15–7 record. This was the 7th time in the last 8 seasons Hawthorn won 15 or more games. Their 4-point win against St Kilda in round 22 clinched a finals series appearance for the first time since 2016, and their 10th in the last 14 seasons. Their 9-point win over Sydney in round 23 clinched a double chance for the first time since 2016, and their 7th in the last 8 seasons.

Hawthorn were defeated by the defending premiers Richmond 64–95 in the qualifying final. This was the first time the two had played a final against each other. This was Hawthorn's third consecutive finals defeat having lost two finals in 2016. It was also Hawthorn's third consecutive qualifying final defeat having lost qualifying finals in 2015 and 2016. Hawthorn were eliminated from the finals by Melbourne 71–104 in the Semi-final. This was the seventh time the two teams had played a final against each other, and the first time since 1990. This was Hawthorn's fourth consecutive finals defeat equalling the club record. It was also Hawthorn's second consecutive semi-final defeat having lost the semi-final in 2016. Hawthorn also became the first team under the AFL final eight system to be eliminated in straight-sets twice having also being eliminated in straight-sets in 2016.

== Club summary ==
The 2018 AFL season was the 122nd season of the VFL/AFL competition since its inception in 1897; having entered the competition in 1925, it was the 94th season contested by the Hawthorn Football Club. Tasmania and iiNet continued as the club's two major sponsors, as they had done since 2006 and 2013 respectively, while Adidas continued to manufacture the club's on-and-off field apparel, as they had done since 2013. Hawthorn continued its alignment with the Box Hill Hawks Football Club in the Victorian Football League, allowing Hawthorn-listed players to play with the Box Hill Hawks when not selected in AFL matches.

== Senior personnel ==
Alastair Clarkson continued as the club's head coach for the fourteenth consecutive season. While Jarryd Roughead continued as the club's captain for the second consecutive season. On 22 August 2017, it was announced Cameron Bruce was departing the club at the end of the 2017 season to join Carlton as a senior assistant coach. On 29 August 2017, it was announced that Collingwood assistant coach Scott Burns and former West Coast player Darren Glass would join Hawthorn as assistant coaches. On 2 October 2017, it was announced that Tracey Gaudry would step down as the club's CEO. Peter Nankivell was appointed as the interim CEO. On 4 October 2017, Richard Garvey resigned as president of the club, with Jeff Kennett re-appointed in the role. Kennett previously served as president of the club from 2005–2011. Garvey remained at the club as a director. On 17 October 2017, it was announced that Justin Reeves was appointed as the CEO of the club. On 2 August 2018, it was announced that after six seasons as assistant coach Brett Ratten would be leaving the club at the end of the season to explore new opportunities.

== Playing list changes ==
=== Trades ===
12 October 2017	To Hawthorn Jarman Impey; Pick 67, 2017 AFL draft	To Port Adelaide Pick 33, 2017 AFL draft Pick 61, 2017 AFL draft 4th round pick, 2018 AFL draft
19 October 2017	To Hawthorn Pick 43, 2017 AFL draft Pick 75, 2017 AFL draft	To Brisbane Lions Luke Hodge; Pick 44, 2017 AFL draft

=== Draft ===
==== AFL draft ====
Round	Overall pick	Player	Recruited from	ref
3	45	James Worpel	Geelong Falcons	
4	67	Dylan Moore	Eastern Ranges	
5	71	Jackson Ross	Eastern Ranges	

==== Rookie draft ====
Round	Overall pick	Player	Recruited from	ref
1	7	Harry Jones	Murray Bushrangers	
2	23	David Mirra	Box Hill Hawks	
3	34	Dallas Willsmore (Note: Willsmore was originally delisted by Hawthorn on 26 October 2017 but was re-drafted as a rookie)	Hawthorn	

=== Retirements and delistings ===
Date	Player	2018 team	Reason	Ref
15 May 2017	Luke Surman	—N/a	Delisted	
15 August 2017	Josh Gibson	—N/a	Retired	
21 August 2017	Jack Fitzpatrick	—N/a	Retired	
26 October 2017	Billy Hartung	North Melbourne	Delisted	
26 October 2017	Kade Stewart	—N/a	Delisted	

== 2018 player squad ==
2018 Hawthorn Football Club squad
Senior list		Rookie list	Coaching staff
2 Jarryd Roughead (C); 3 Tom Mitchell; 4 Jarman Impey; 5 Ryan Burton; 6 James Sicily; 7 Ben McEvoy; 8 Taylor Duryea; 9 Shaun Burgoyne; 10 Jaeger O'Meara; 11 Brendan Whitecross; 12 James Frawley; 13 Jonathan O'Rourke; 14 Grant Birchall; 15 Blake Hardwick; 16 Isaac Smith (VC); 17 Daniel Howe; 18 Jonathon Ceglar; 19 Jack Gunston; 21 Kieran Lovell	22 Luke Breust; 23 Tim O'Brien; 24 Ben Stratton; 25 Ryan Schoenmakers; 26 Liam Shiels (VC); 27 Marc Pittonet; 28 Paul Puopolo; 29 Will Langford; 30 Kaiden Brand; 31 Ricky Henderson; 33 Cyril Rioli (ret); 34 Kurt Heatherley; 35 Harry Morrison; 36 Dylan Moore; 37 Jackson Ross; 38 James Worpel; 39 Mitchell Lewis; 42 Teia Miles; Ty Vickery (ret)	20 Dallas Willsmore; 32 David Mirra; 40 Harry Jones; 41 Oliver Hanrahan; 43 Changkuoth Jiath (B); 44 Conor Glass (B); 45 Conor Nash (B); 46 James Cousins	Head coach: Alastair Clarkson; Assistant coaches: Brett Ratten (stoppages coach); Adem Yze (forward coach); Scott Burns (midfield coach); Darren Glass (backline coach); Damian Monkhorst (ruck coach); Damian Carroll (head of coaching and development); Max Bailey (development coach); Legend: (c) Captain(s); (vc) Vice-captain(s); Injured; Upgraded rookie(s); (B) Category B rookie; (FA) Free agent; (ret) Retired; Updated: 10 September 2018; Source(s): HFC Website; Coaches

== Season fixture ==
=== AFLX ===
Rd	Date and local time	Opponent	Scores (Hawthorn's scores indicated in bold)			Venue	Report
Rd	Date and local time	Opponent	Home	Away	Result	Venue	Report
–	Friday, 16 February (7:08 pm)	Essendon	**3.6.7 (73)**	3.3.6 (54)	Won by 19 points	Etihad Stadium (H)	
–	Friday, 16 February (9:00 pm)	St Kilda	2.5.5 (55)	**4.5.7 (77)**	Won by 22 points	Etihad Stadium (A)	
GF	Friday, 16 February (9:33 pm)	Melbourne	3.3.8 (56)	**1.5.6 (46)**	Lost by 10 points	Etihad Stadium	Report

=== JLT Community series ===
Rd	Date and local time	Opponent	Scores (Hawthorn's scores indicated in bold)			Venue	Broadcast	Attendance	Report
Rd	Date and local time	Opponent	Home	Away	Result	Venue	Broadcast	Attendance	Report
1	Saturday, 3 March (2:05 pm)	Western Bulldogs	15.10 (100)	**11.12 (78)**	Lost by 22 points	Mars Stadium (A)	Fox Footy	4,565	Report
2	Saturday, 10 March (7:05 pm)	Carlton	**13.19 (97)**	16.6 (102)	Lost by 5 points	University of Tasmania Stadium (H)	Fox Footy	5,405	Report

=== Premiership season ===
Rd	Date and local time	Opponent	Scores (Hawthorn's scores indicated in bold)			Venue	Record	Report
Rd	Date and local time	Opponent	Home	Away	Result	Venue	Record	Report
1	Saturday, 24 March (7:25 pm)	Collingwood	**15.11 (101)**	9.13 (67)	Won by 34 points	Melbourne Cricket Ground (H)	1–0	Report
2	Monday, 2 April (3:20 pm)	Geelong	18.9 (117)	**17.16 (118)**	Won by 1 point	Melbourne Cricket Ground (A)	2–0	Report
3	Sunday, 8 April (1:10 pm)	Richmond	15.12 (102)	**13.11 (89)**	Lost by 13 points	Melbourne Cricket Ground (A)	2–1	Report
4	Sunday, 15 April (3:20 pm)	Melbourne	**18.7 (115)**	6.12 (48)	Won by 67 points	Melbourne Cricket Ground (H)	3–1	Report
5	Sunday, 22 April (3:20 pm)	North Melbourne	14.14 (98)	**11.4 (70)**	Lost by 28 points	Etihad Stadium (A)	3–2	Report
6	Saturday, 28 April (7:25 pm)	St Kilda	**13.11 (89)**	7.12 (54)	Won by 35 points	University of Tasmania Stadium (H)	4–2	Report
7	Saturday, 5 May (2:10 pm)	Essendon	10.7 (67)	**13.12 (90)**	Won by 23 points	Melbourne Cricket Ground (A)	5–2	Report
8	Friday, 11 May (7:50 pm)	Sydney	**10.11 (71)**	12.7 (79)	Lost by 8 points	Melbourne Cricket Ground (H)	5–3	Report
9	Sunday, 20 May (3:20 pm)	Brisbane Lions	20.9 (129)	**11.7 (73)**	Lost by 56 points	The Gabba (A)	5–4	Report
10	Sunday, 27 May (1:10 pm)	West Coast	**9.6 (60)**	11.9 (75)	Lost by 15 points	Etihad Stadium (H)	5–5	Report
11	Saturday, 2 June (2:10 pm)	Port Adelaide	**9.10 (64)**	9.7 (61)	Won by 3 points	University of Tasmania Stadium (H)	6–5	Report
12	Bye							
13	Saturday, 16 June (7:25 pm)	Adelaide	**12.16 (88)**	4.8 (32)	Won by 56 points	Melbourne Cricket Ground (H)	7–5	Report
14	Saturday, 23 June (1:45 pm)	Gold Coast	**13.18 (96)**	5.13 (43)	Won by 53 points	University of Tasmania Stadium (H)	8–5	Report
15	Saturday, 30 June (7:25 pm)	Greater Western Sydney	13.17 (95)	**12.6 (84)**	Lost by 11 points	Spotless Stadium (A)	8–6	Report
16	Saturday, 7 July (7:25 pm)	Western Bulldogs	9.5 (59)	**19.8 (122)**	Won by 63 points	Etihad Stadium (A)	9–6	Report
17	Saturday, 14 July (1:45 pm)	Brisbane Lions	**9.11 (65)**	15.8 (98)	Lost by 33 points	University of Tasmania Stadium (H)	9–7	Report
18	Sunday, 22 July (1:10 pm)	Carlton	7.10 (52)	**18.16 (124)**	Won by 72 points	Etihad Stadium (A)	10–7	Report
19	Sunday, 29 July (2:40 pm)	Fremantle	7.11 (53)	**17.10 (112)**	Won by 59 points	Optus Stadium (A)	11–7	Report
20	Saturday, 4 August (1:45 pm)	Essendon	**16.11 (107)**	16.7 (103)	Won by 4 points	Melbourne Cricket Ground (H)	12–7	Report
21	Saturday, 11 August (1:45 pm)	Geelong	**10.11 (71)**	8.12 (60)	Won by 11 points	Melbourne Cricket Ground (H)	13–7	Report
22	Saturday, 18 August (7:25 pm)	St Kilda	11.10 (76)	**12.8 (80)**	Won by 4 points	Etihad Stadium (A)	14–7	Report
23	Saturday, 25 August (7:25 pm)	Sydney	10.14 (74)	**12.11 (83)**	Won by 9 points	Sydney Cricket Ground (A)	15–7	Report

==== Ladder ====
Pos	Team	Pld	W	L	D	PF	PA	PP	Pts	Qualification
1	Richmond	22	18	4	0	2143	1574	136.1	72	2018 finals
2	West Coast (P)	22	16	6	0	2012	1657	121.4	64	2018 finals
3	Collingwood	22	15	7	0	2046	1699	120.4	60	2018 finals
**4**	Hawthorn	**22**	**15**	**7**	**0**	**1972**	**1642**	**120.1**	60	2018 finals
5	Melbourne	22	14	8	0	2299	1749	131.4	56	2018 finals
6	Sydney	22	14	8	0	1822	1664	109.5	56	2018 finals
7	Greater Western Sydney	22	13	8	1	1898	1661	114.3	54	2018 finals
8	Geelong	22	13	9	0	2045	1554	131.6	52	2018 finals
9	North Melbourne	22	12	10	0	1950	1790	108.9	48	
10	Port Adelaide	22	12	10	0	1780	1654	107.6	48	
11	Essendon	22	12	10	0	1932	1838	105.1	48	
12	Adelaide	22	12	10	0	1941	1865	104.1	48	
13	Western Bulldogs	22	8	14	0	1575	2037	77.3	32	
14	Fremantle	22	8	14	0	1556	2041	76.2	32	
15	Brisbane Lions	22	5	17	0	1825	2049	89.1	20	
16	St Kilda	22	4	17	1	1606	2125	75.6	18	
17	Gold Coast	22	4	18	0	1308	2182	59.9	16	
18	Carlton	22	2	20	0	1353	2282	59.3	8	

Source: AFL
Rules for classification: 1) points; 2) percentage; 3) number of points for.
(P) Premiers

=== Finals ===
Rd	Date and local time	Opponent	Scores (Hawthorn's scores indicated in bold)			Venue	Report
Rd	Date and local time	Opponent	Home	Away	Result	Venue	Report
Qualifying final	Thursday, 6 September (7:20 pm)	Richmond	13.17 (95)	**9.10 (64)**	Lost by 31 points	Melbourne Cricket Ground (A)	Report
Semi-final	Friday, 14 September (7:50 pm)	Melbourne	**10.11 (71)**	16.8 (104)	Lost by 33 points	Melbourne Cricket Ground (H)	Report

== Awards, records and milestones ==
=== Awards ===
AFL awards

- Leigh Matthews Trophy: Tom Mitchell.
- Brownlow Medal: Tom Mitchell.
- All-Australian team: Luke Breust, Jack Gunston, Tom Mitchell.
- AFLPA player of the month: Luke Breust – July.

Club awards

- Peter Crimmins Medal: Tom Mitchell
- Leading goalkicker: Luke Breust
- Best player in finals: Liam Shiels
- Most consistent player: Jack Gunston
- Most promising player: Blake Hardwick
- Best Clubman: Taylor Duryea
- Best first year player (debut season): James Worpel

=== Records ===
==== VFL/AFL records ====
- Most disposals in a single game: 54 – Tom Mitchell
- Most disposals in a season: 848 – Tom Mitchell

==== Club records ====
- Most handballs in a single game: 34 – Tom Mitchell
- Most contested possessions in a single game: 27 – Tom Mitchell
- Most inside 50's in a single match: 12 – Liam Shiels (Tied with Clinton Young)
- Most clearances in a season: 192 – Tom Mitchell
- Most contested possessions in a season: 388 – Tom Mitchell
- Most contested marks: 308 – Jarryd Roughead
- Most marks inside 50: 617 – Jarryd Roughead
- Most games coached: 329 – Alastair Clarkson
- Most victories coached: 205 – Alastair Clarkson
- Most home and away games coached: 303 – Alastair Clarkson
- Most home and away victories coached: 189 – Alastair Clarkson
- Most finals games coached: 26 – Alastair Clarkson

=== Milestones ===
- Round 1
  - Jack Gunston – 150th AFL game.
  - Jarman Impey – Hawthorn debut.
- Round 2
  - Paul Puopolo – 150th AFL game.
  - Tom Mitchell – 50th AFL goal.
  - Jarman Impey – 1st goal for Hawthorn.
- Round 3
  - James Frawley – 50th game for Hawthorn.
- Round 4
  - Ben Stratton –150th AFL game.
  - David Mirra – AFL debut.
- Round 6
  - Jack Gunston – 300th AFL goal.
  - Harry Morrison – 1st AFL goal.
  - James Worpel – AFL debut.
- Round 8
  - James Sicily – 50th AFL game.
- Round 9
  - James Worpel – 1st AFL goal.
  - Mitchell Lewis – AFL debut.
- Round 10
  - Blake Hardwick – 1st AFL goal.
- Round 13
  - Shaun Burgoyne – 350th AFL game.
  - James Sicily – 50th AFL goal.
- Round 14
  - Tom Mitchell – 100th AFL game.
- Round 15
  - Jarryd Roughead – 550th AFL goal.
- Round 17
  - Jack Gunston – 300th goal for Hawthorn.
  - James Frawley – 200th AFL game.
  - Jack Gunston - 150th game for Hawthorn.
- Round 18
  - Alastair Clarkson – 200th win as coach.
- Round 20
  - Alastair Clarkson – 300th home and away game as coach.
- Round 21
  - Luke Breust – 50th goal for the season.
  - Conor Nash – AFL debut.
- Round 22
  - Conor Nash – 1st AFL goal.
- Qualifying final
  - Shaun Burgoyne – 200th game for Hawthorn.
  - Isaac Smith – 150th AFL goal.
- Semi-final
  - Daniel Howe – 50th AFL game.
  - Ryan Schoenmakers – 50th AFL goal.
  - Jack Gunston – 50th goal for the season.
