= Jeff Dalgleish =

Australian rules football field umpire

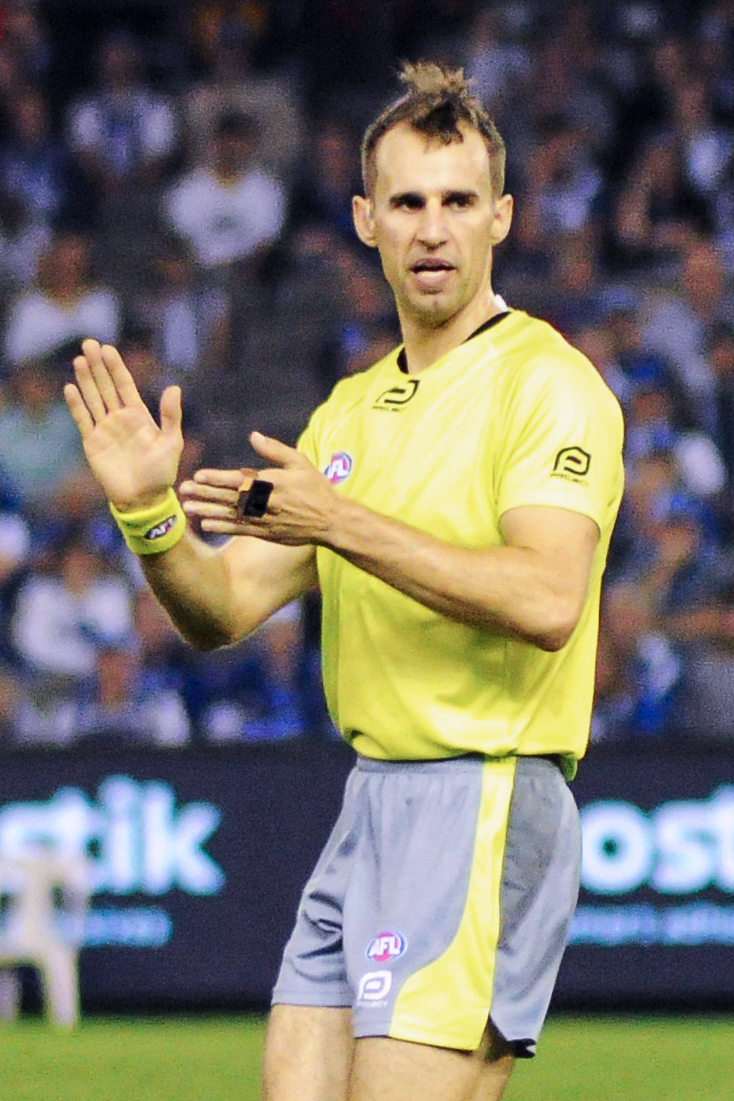
- Dalgleish in April 2018

Personal information
- Full name: Jeff Dalgleish

Umpiring career
Years	League	Role
2009–present	AFL	Field umpire

Career highlights
- AFL Debut 2009; Grand Final 2015

Jeff Dalgleish is an Australian rules football field umpire in the Australian Football League.

Based in Western Australia, Dalgleish began umpiring in 1999 in the East Fremantle Juniors and the Western Australian Amateur Football League. He progressed to professional football, making his WAFL umpiring debut in 2003 and his Australian Football League debut in 2009.

Dalgleish rose to become one of the league's best umpires in the mid-2010s, and was selected to umpire in his first grand final in 2015.

Dalgleish's brother Brett also umpires in the AFL as a boundary umpire.
