= 2009 Hawthorn Football Club season =

85th season in the Australian Football League

Hawthorn Football Club
2009 season
- President: Jeff Kennett
- Coach: Alastair Clarkson
- Captain: Sam Mitchell
- Home ground: Melbourne Cricket Ground; Aurora Stadium
- Pre-season competition: Quarter final
- AFL season: 9–13 (9th)
- Finals series: Did not qualify
- Best and Fairest: Sam Mitchell
- Leading goalkicker: Lance Franklin (67)
- Highest home attendance: 77,278 (Round 22 vs. Essendon)
- Lowest home attendance: 15,080 (Round 15 vs. North Melbourne)
- Average home attendance: 39,635

The 2009 season was the Hawthorn Football Club's 85th season in the Australian Football League and 108th overall. Hawthorn entered the season as the defending AFL Premiers.

== Playing list changes ==
=== Draft ===
==== AFL draft ====
Round	Overall pick	Player	Recruited from	ref
1	16	Ryan Schoenmakers	Norwood	
2	34	Liam Shiels	Eastern Ranges	
3	50	Jordan Lisle	Oakleigh Chargers	
4	63	Luke Lowden	Sandringham Dragons	
5	75	Shane Savage	Dandenong Stingrays	

==== Rookie draft ====
Round	Overall pick	Player	Recruited from	ref
1	16	Riley Milne	Murray Bushrangers	
2	32	Haydn Kiel	Brisbane Lions	
3	47	Luke Breust	Temora	
4	61	Carl Peterson	Richmond	
5	73	Garry Moss (Note: Moss was originally delisted by Hawthorn on 16 October 2008 but was re-drafted as a rookie)	Hawthorn	
6	81	Matt Suckling	Sandringham Dragons	
7	85	Will Sierakowski	NSW AFL Scholarship program	

=== Retirements and delistings ===
Date	Player	2009 team	Reason	Ref
12 March 2008	Danny Jacobs	—N/a	Retired	
16 October 2008	Tim Clarke	—N/a	Delisted	
16 October 2008	Zac Dawson	St Kilda	Delisted	
16 October 2008	Luke McEntee	—N/a	Delisted	
8 November 2008	Shane Crawford	—N/a	Retired	

== 2009 Player squad ==
2009 Hawthorn Football Club squad
Senior list		Rookie list	Coaching staff
1 Max Bailey; 2 Jarryd Roughead; 3 Jordan Lewis; 4 Rick Ladson; 5 Sam Mitchell (C); 6 Mark Williams; 7 Michael Osborne; 8 Xavier Ellis; 10 Chance Bateman; 11 Clinton Young; 12 Brad Sewell; 13 Simon Taylor; 14 Grant Birchall; 15 Luke Hodge (VC); 16 Beau Dowler; 17 Beau Muston; 18 Brent Guerra; 19 Mitch Thorp; 20 Tim Boyle	21 Ben McGlynn; 22 Travis Tuck; 23 Lance Franklin; 24 Trent Croad; 25 Ryan Schoenmakers; 26 Liam Shiels; 27 Stephen Gilham; 29 Thomas Murphy; 30 Campbell Brown; 31 Stuart Dew; 32 Josh Kennedy; 33 Cyril Rioli; 34 Brent Renouf; 35 Jarryd Morton; 36 Jordan Lisle; 37 Brendan Whitecross; 38 Luke Lowden; 39 Robert Campbell; 40 Shane Savage	28 Garry Moss; 41 Tim Walsh; 42 Matt Suckling; 43 Will Sierakowski; 44 Cameron Stokes; 45 Riley Milne; 46 Haydn Kiel; 47 Luke Breust; 48 Carl Peterson	Head coach: Alastair Clarkson; Legend: (c) Captain(s); (vc) Vice-captain(s); Updated: 29 August 2009; Source(s): Draftguru

== Schedule ==
=== NAB Cup ===
Rd	Date and local time	Opponent	Scores (Hawthorn's scores indicated in bold)			Venue	Attendance
Rd	Date and local time	Opponent	Home	Away	Result	Venue	Attendance
1	Saturday, 21 February (4:10 pm)	Melbourne	**0.11.3 (69)**	1.8.9 (66)	Won by 3 points	Aurora Stadium (H)	8,122
Quarter final	Sunday, 1 March (4:40 pm)	Carlton	2.13.16 (112)	**2.10.10 (88)**	Lost by 24 points	Etihad Stadium (A)	19,111

=== Premiership Season ===
Rd	Date and local time	Opponent	Scores (Hawthorn's scores indicated in bold)			Venue	Attendance	Record	Report
Rd	Date and local time	Opponent	Home	Away	Result	Venue	Attendance	Record	Report
1	Friday, 27 March (7:40 pm)	Geelong	**16.7 (103)**	15.21 (111)	Lost by 8 points	Melbourne Cricket Ground (H)	69,593	0–1	Report
2	Saturday, 4 April (7:10 pm)	Sydney	22.11 (143)	**15.15 (105)**	Lost by 38 points	ANZ Stadium (A)	36,116	0–2	Report
3	Sunday, 12 April (2:10 pm)	North Melbourne	10.9 (69)	**19.9 (123)**	Won by 54 points	Etihad Stadium (A)	34,983	1–2	Report
4	Saturday, 18 April (2:10 pm)	Port Adelaide	**12.13 (85)**	17.13 (115)	Lost by 30 points	Melbourne Cricket Ground (H)	33,274	1–3	Report
5	Saturday, 25 April (5:20 pm)	West Coast	**11.8 (74)**	7.14 (56)	Won by 18 points	Aurora Stadium (H)	17,880	2–3	Report
6	Saturday, 2 May (2:10 pm)	Carlton	**16.10 (106)**	15.12 (102)	Won by 4 points	Melbourne Cricket Ground (H)	69,014	3–3	Report
7	Friday, 8 May (7:40 pm)	Essendon	17.14 (116)	**10.12 (72)**	Lost by 44 points	Etihad Stadium (A)	50,475	3–4	Report
8	Friday, 15 May (6:40 pm)	Fremantle	9.11 (65)	**13.9 (87)**	Won by 22 points	Subiaco Oval (A)	39,135	4–4	Report
9	Sunday, 24 May (4:40 pm)	Melbourne	**17.12 (114)**	13.14 (92)	Won by 22 points	Melbourne Cricket Ground (H)	39,395	5–4	Report
10	Sunday, 31 May (1:10 pm)	Adelaide	16.10 (106)	**12.7 (79)**	Lost by 27 points	AAMI Stadium (A)	40,035	5–5	Report
11	Sunday, 7 June (2:10 pm)	Sydney	**12.14 (86)**	11.9 (75)	Won by 11 points	Melbourne Cricket Ground (H)	44,464	6–5	Report
12	Sunday, 14 June (1:10 pm)	Brisbane Lions	**7.9 (51)**	13.15 (93)	Lost by 42 points	Aurora Stadium (H)	16,710	6–6	Report
13	Saturday, 27 June (5:40 pm)	West Coast	16.11 (107)	**13.9 (87)**	Lost by 20 points	Subiaco Oval (A)	31,441	6–7	Report
14	Saturday, 4 July (7:10 pm)	Western Bulldogs	19.19 (133)	**6.9 (45)**	Lost by 88 points	Etihad Stadium (A)	36,827	6–8	Report
15	Sunday, 12 July (1:10 pm)	North Melbourne	**10.13 (73)**	9.10 (64)	Won by 9 points	Aurora Stadium (H)	15,080	7–8	Report
16	Saturday, 18 July (7:10 pm)	Collingwood	11.10 (76)	**18.13 (121)**	Won by 45 points	Melbourne Cricket Ground (A)	66,149	8–8	Report
17	Saturday, 25 July (2:10 pm)	Geelong	15.9 (99)	**14.14 (98)**	Lost by 1 point	Melbourne Cricket Ground (A)	64,803	8–9	Report
18	Sunday, 2 August (2:40 pm)	Port Adelaide	18.13 (121)	**14.19 (103)**	Lost by 18 points	AAMI Stadium (A)	25,154	8–10	Report
19	Saturday, 8 August (2:10 pm)	St Kilda	**7.7 (49)**	10.14 (74)	Lost by 25 points	Aurora Stadium (H)	20,011	8–11	Report
20	Friday, 14 August (7:40 pm)	Adelaide	**9.13 (67)**	13.16 (94)	Lost by 27 points	Melbourne Cricket Ground (H)	32,583	8–12	Report
21	Saturday, 22 August (7:10 pm)	Richmond	14.9 (93)	**20.15 (135)**	Won by 42 points	Melbourne Cricket Ground (A)	34,779	9–12	Report
22	Saturday, 29 August (2:10 pm)	Essendon	**14.15 (99)**	16.20 (116)	Lost by 17 points	Melbourne Cricket Ground (H)	77,278	9–13	Report

== Ladder ==
2009 AFL ladder
Pos	Team	Pld	W	L	D	PF	PA	PP	Pts	
1	St Kilda	22	20	2	0	2197	1411	155.7	80	Finals series
2	Geelong (P)	22	18	4	0	2312	1815	127.4	72	Finals series
3	Western Bulldogs	22	15	7	0	2378	1940	122.6	60	Finals series
4	Collingwood	22	15	7	0	2174	1778	122.3	60	Finals series
5	Adelaide	22	14	8	0	2104	1789	117.6	56	Finals series
6	Brisbane Lions	22	13	8	1	2017	1890	106.7	54	Finals series
7	Carlton	22	13	9	0	2270	2055	110.5	52	Finals series
8	Essendon	22	10	11	1	2080	2127	97.8	42	Finals series
9	Hawthorn	22	9	13	0	1962	2120	92.5	36	
10	Port Adelaide	22	9	13	0	1990	2244	88.7	36	
11	West Coast	22	8	14	0	1893	2029	93.3	32	
12	Sydney	22	8	14	0	1888	2027	93.1	32	
13	North Melbourne	22	7	14	1	1680	2015	83.4	30	
14	Fremantle	22	6	16	0	1747	2259	77.3	24	
15	Richmond	22	5	16	1	1774	2388	74.3	22	
16	Melbourne	22	4	18	0	1706	2285	74.7	16	

Source: AFL ladder
Rules for classification: 1) points; 2) percentage; 3) number of points for.
(P) Premiers
