= Swingman =

Athlete capable of playing multiple positions in their sport

A swingman is an athlete capable of playing multiple positions in their sport.

== Basketball ==
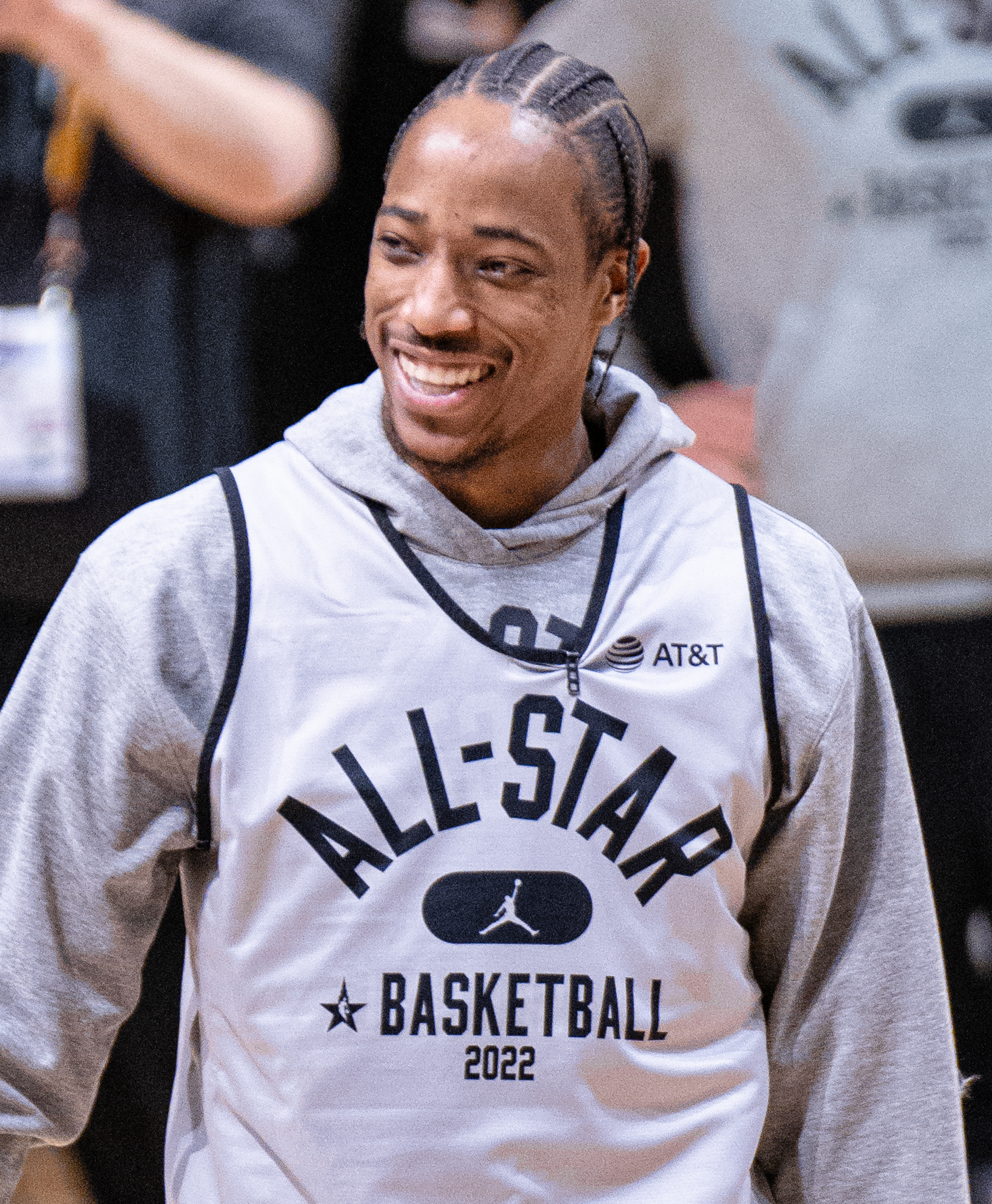
An example of an NBA swingman would be DeMar DeRozan

In basketball, the term "swingman" (a.k.a. "wing" or "guard-forward") denotes a player who can play both the shooting guard (2) and small forward (3) positions, and in essence swing between the positions.

Examples include:

- NBA players: Tracy McGrady, Vince Carter, Jaylen Brown, Paul Pierce, Jimmy Butler, Michael Jordan, Kobe Bryant, Eddie Jones, DeMar DeRozan, Paul George, Andre Iguodala, Klay Thompson, Khris Middleton, LeBron James, Danny Green, Kevin Durant and Evan Turner
- WNBA players: Seimone Augustus, Maya Moore, Tamika Catchings, Angel McCoughtry, Kahleah Copper, Betnijah Laney-Hamilton, DeWanna Bonner, Rhyne Howard, Bridget Carleton and Rickea Jackson.

== Baseball ==
In baseball, a swingman is a pitcher who can work as either a reliever or a starter. To thrive in this role, pitchers must possess the stamina of a starter as well as the flexibility to work out of the bullpen. It may be difficult for swingmen to settle into the same type of routine as pitchers used exclusively in one role.

=== History ===
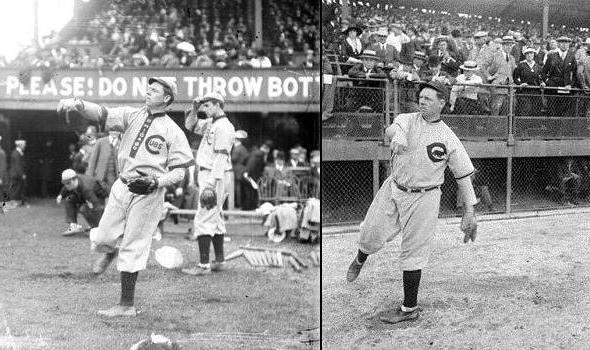
Brown was used as a swingman in the early 20th century.

In 19th century baseball, since the vast majority of games were finished by the starting pitcher, the swingman role did not exist. In the early 1900s, as the percentage of complete games fell, relief appearances became more common, and pitchers began to be used in this mode. Early examples included star pitchers such as Mordecai Brown and Ed Walsh (both in the Baseball Hall of Fame) as well as pioneers of the relief role such as Doc Crandall and Firpo Marberry.

Through the 1930s, teams continued to use their best pitchers as both starters and relievers. Dizzy Dean, Lefty Grove, and (to a lesser extent) Carl Hubbell were all used as swingmen during this era. In the 1950s and 1960s, strict starting rotations and specific roles for relief pitchers became standard; these trends reduced the prevalence of swingmen. From 1970 through the present day, the usage of swingmen has continued to decline due to the increased specialization of pitchers.

During this era, pitchers may be deployed as swingmen early in their careers to ease their transition to the major leagues, move to a permanent starting role once they are deemed ready, and transition back to a swingman/bullpen role as they decline with age, a career arc exemplified by Rudy May. Swingmen are also valuable in the postseason, when they may be needed to replace a struggling starter early in a game and pitch multiple innings while keeping the score close.

== Other sports ==
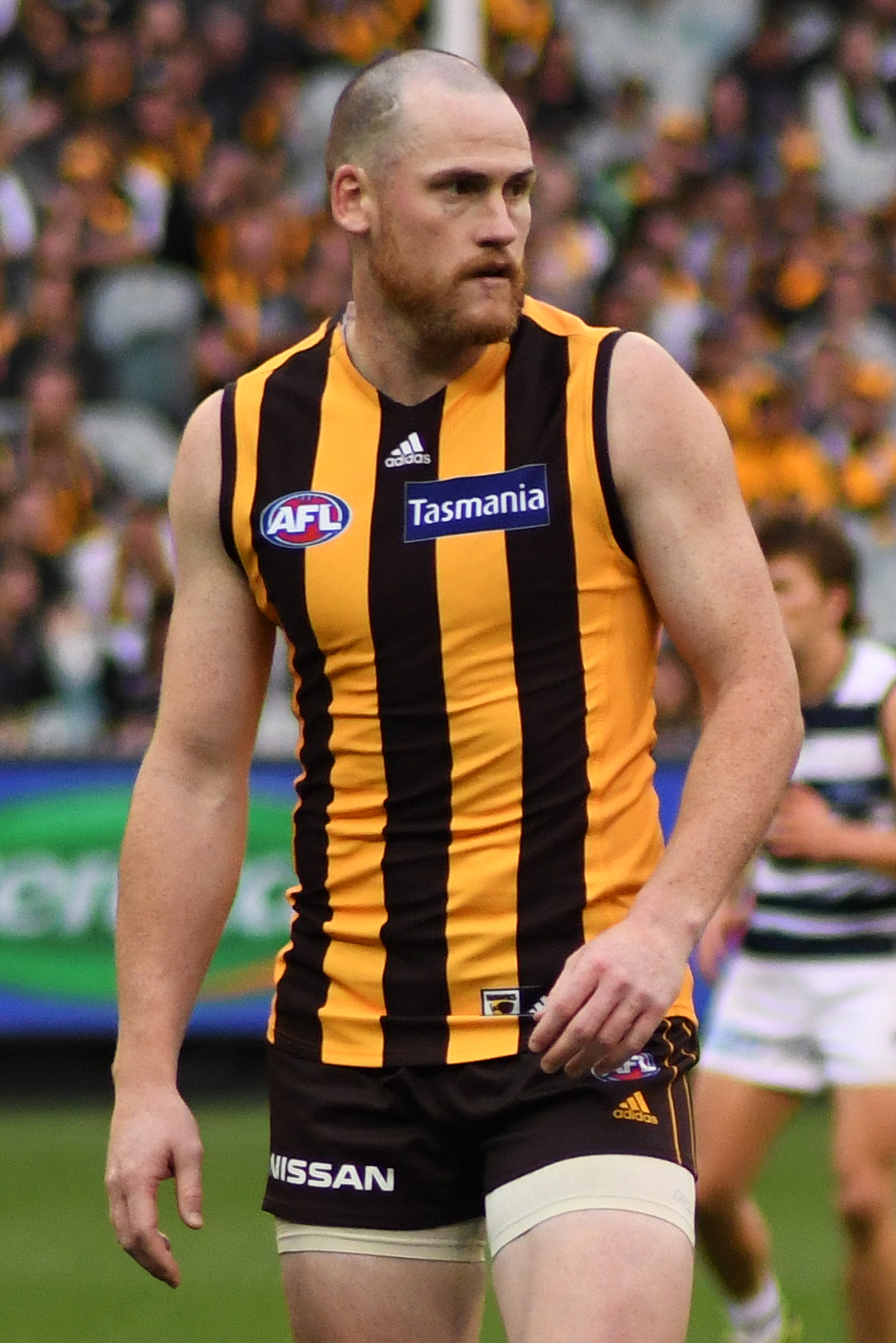
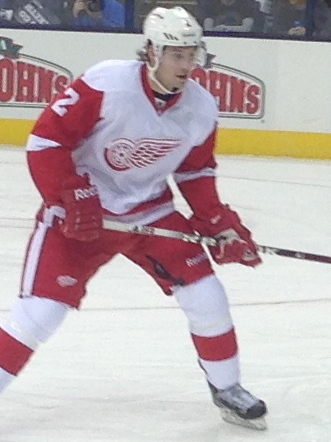
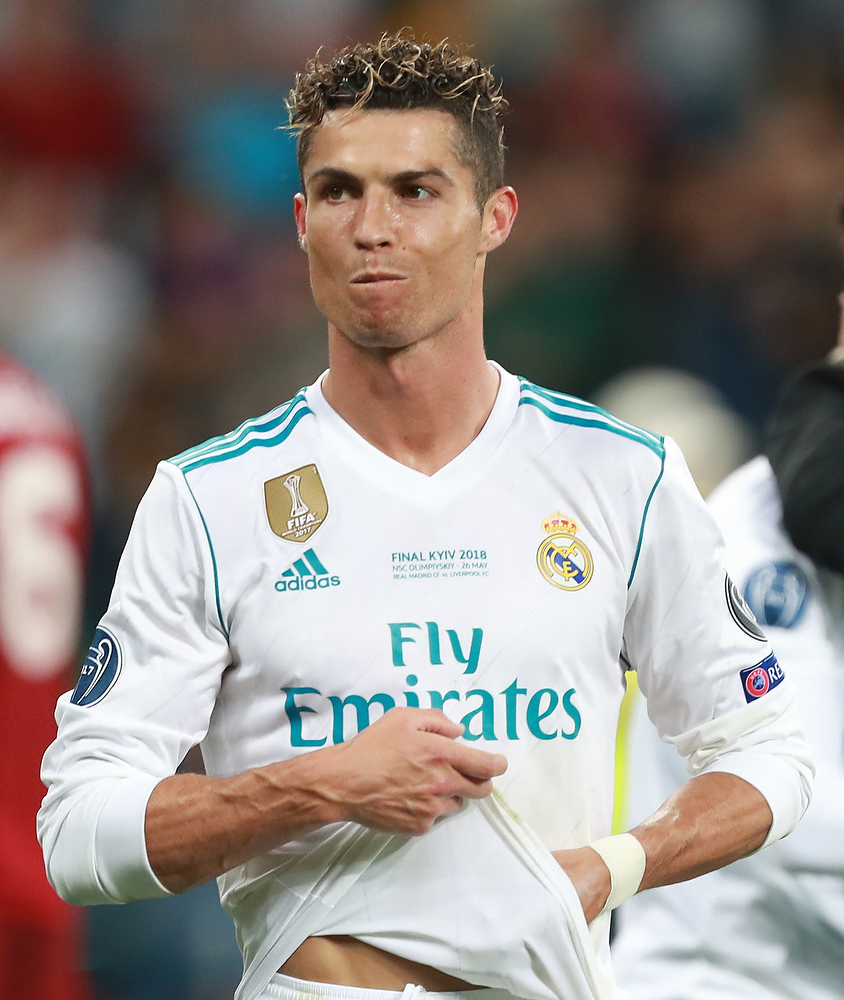
Examples of swingmen in other sports, Jarryd Roughead (left), Brendan Smith (right), and Cristiano Ronaldo (bottom).

=== Australian football ===
In Australian rules football, a swingman is typically a player who can play both in attack and in defence, usually as a key position player. Examples include Harry Taylor, Ryan Schoenmakers, Ben Reid and Jarryd Roughead.

=== Ice hockey ===
In ice hockey, a swingman is a player that could play both defenseman and forward, such as Brent Burns of the San Jose Sharks, Dustin Byfuglien of the Winnipeg Jets, Brendan Smith of the New York Rangers and Calder Cup Champion Paul Bissonnette.

=== Association football ===
In association football, a swingman is a term used for a versatile player capable of playing multiple roles—such as a winger, wing-back, or central midfielder—often switching positions within a single match. Examples of these players include Luca Orellano, Cristiano Ronaldo, and Phil Foden amongst others.

== See also ==
- Tweener (basketball)
- All-rounder (cricket)
- Utility player (Association football)
