= 2015 AFL Grand Final =

Grand final of the 2015 Australian Football League season

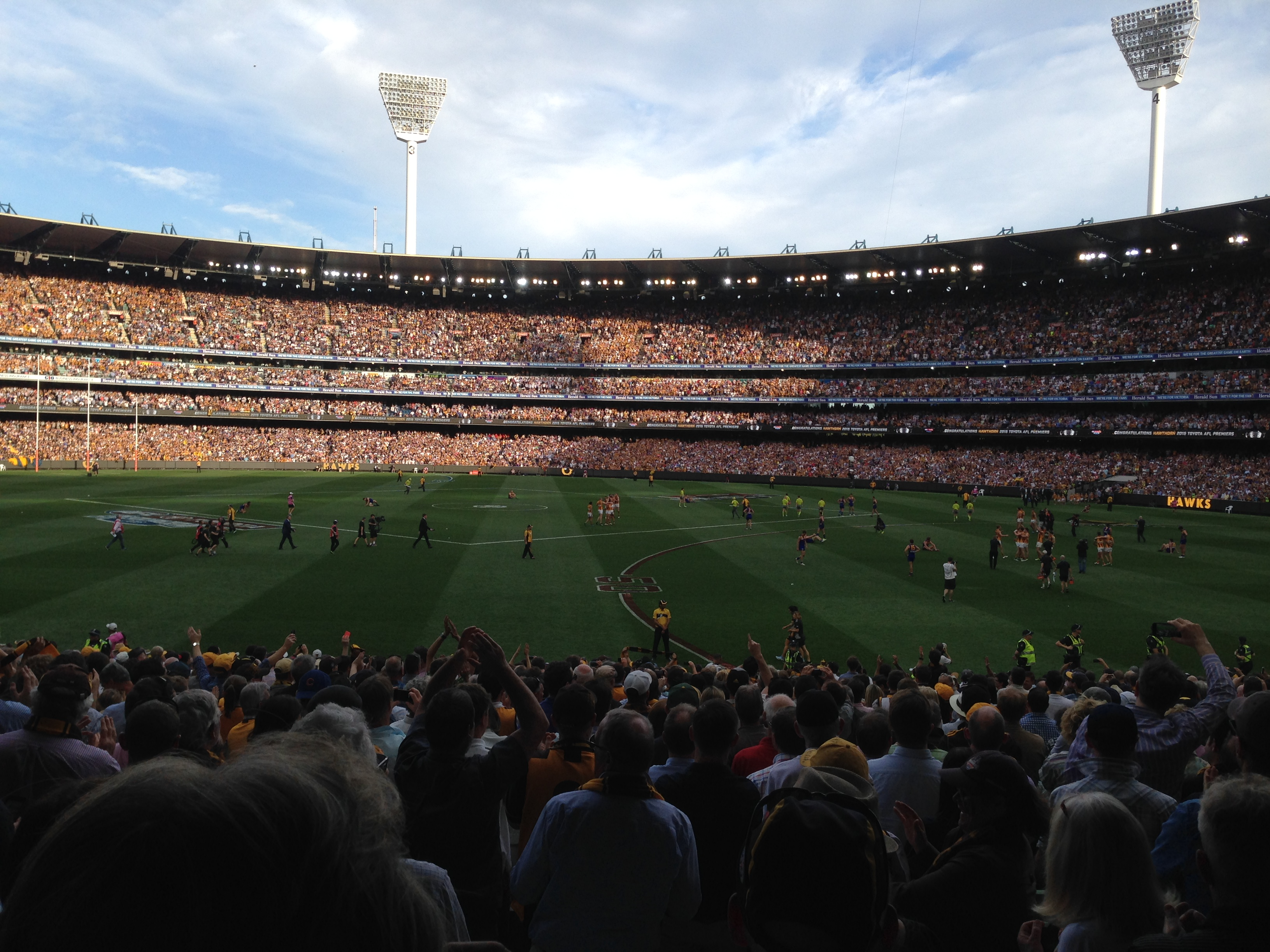
- Moments after the final siren at the MCG

Hawthorn	West Coast
16.11 (107)	8.13 (61)
	1	2	3	4
HAW	5.0 (30)	9.3 (57)	14.5 (89)	16.11 (107)
WCE	1.5 (11)	3.8 (26)	5.9 (39)	8.13 (61)
- Date: 3 October 2015, 2.30 p.m.
- Stadium: Melbourne Cricket Ground
- Attendance: 98,633
- Favourite: Hawthorn
- Umpires: Brett Rosebury, Matt Stevic, Jeff Dalgleish
- Coin toss won by: Hawthorn
- Kicked toward: City End

Ceremonies
- Pre-match entertainment: Chris Isaak, Bryan Adams, Ellie Goulding, Mike Brady
- National anthem: Kate Ceberano
- Post-match entertainment: Bryan Adams, Ellie Goulding

Accolades
- Norm Smith Medallist: Cyril Rioli
- Jock McHale Medallist: Alastair Clarkson

Broadcast in Australia
- Network: Seven Network
- Commentators: Bruce McAvaney (host and commentator); Hamish McLachlan (host); Dennis Cometti (commentator); Wayne Carey (expert commentator); Cameron Ling (expert commentator); Matthew Richardson (boundary rider); Tim Watson (boundary rider); Leigh Matthews (analyst)

The 2015 AFL Grand Final was an Australian rules football match contested between the Hawthorn Football Club and the West Coast Eagles at the Melbourne Cricket Ground on 3 October 2015. It was the 120th annual Grand Final of the Australian Football League (formerly the Victorian Football League), staged to determine the premiers for the 2015 AFL season. The match, attended by 98,632 spectators, was won by Hawthorn by a margin of 46 points, marking the club's third consecutive premiership and thirteenth VFL/AFL premiership victory overall. Hawthorn's Cyril Rioli was awarded the Norm Smith Medal as the best player on the ground.

== Background ==
With the Fremantle Dockers and West Coast Eagles finishing first and second respectively on the AFL ladder at the conclusion of the home and away season (and both subsequently winning their qualifying finals to set up two home preliminary finals in Perth for the first time), it was anticipated that the 2015 grand final could be a western derby between the two Western Australian teams for the first time at the MCG.

Hawthorn experienced an average start to the year, with a record of 4–4 after eight matches (including losses to non-finals teams Essendon, Port Adelaide and Greater Western Sydney), but lost just twice more for the remainder of the regular season to finish in the top three for the fifth consecutive year. The team then lost its qualifying final to West Coast at Domain Stadium by 32 points, but rebounded to defeat Adelaide and Fremantle (in Perth) in their semi and preliminary Finals, by 74 and 27 points respectively, to qualify for its fourth consecutive grand final.

West Coast entered the season low on expectations after finishing ninth the previous year and losing key defenders Eric Mackenzie and Mitch Brown to knee injuries early in the year. After losing two of the first three games, to the Western Bulldogs and Fremantle, the Eagles finished the season with a record of 16–5–1 to finish in the top two for the first time since 2006. The Eagles received the week off after beating Hawthorn in the qualifying final by 32 points, and subsequently defeated North Melbourne by 25 points in the preliminary final to progress to their first grand final since 2006.

Hawthorn and West Coast met once during the home-and-away season, in round 19 at Domain Stadium, with Hawthorn winning by 14 points.

The grand final was held on the first Saturday in October, rather than its traditional date on the last Saturday of September, because the 2015 Cricket World Cup delayed access to some AFL grounds early in the season. The game was held at the Melbourne Cricket Ground, Hawthorn's main home ground for the home and away season: West Coast who had only played there once during the season compared with Hawthorn's 11 matches. It was the second time that the two sides had met in a grand final; the first was in 1991, which Hawthorn won by a margin of 53 points.

== Pre-match entertainment ==
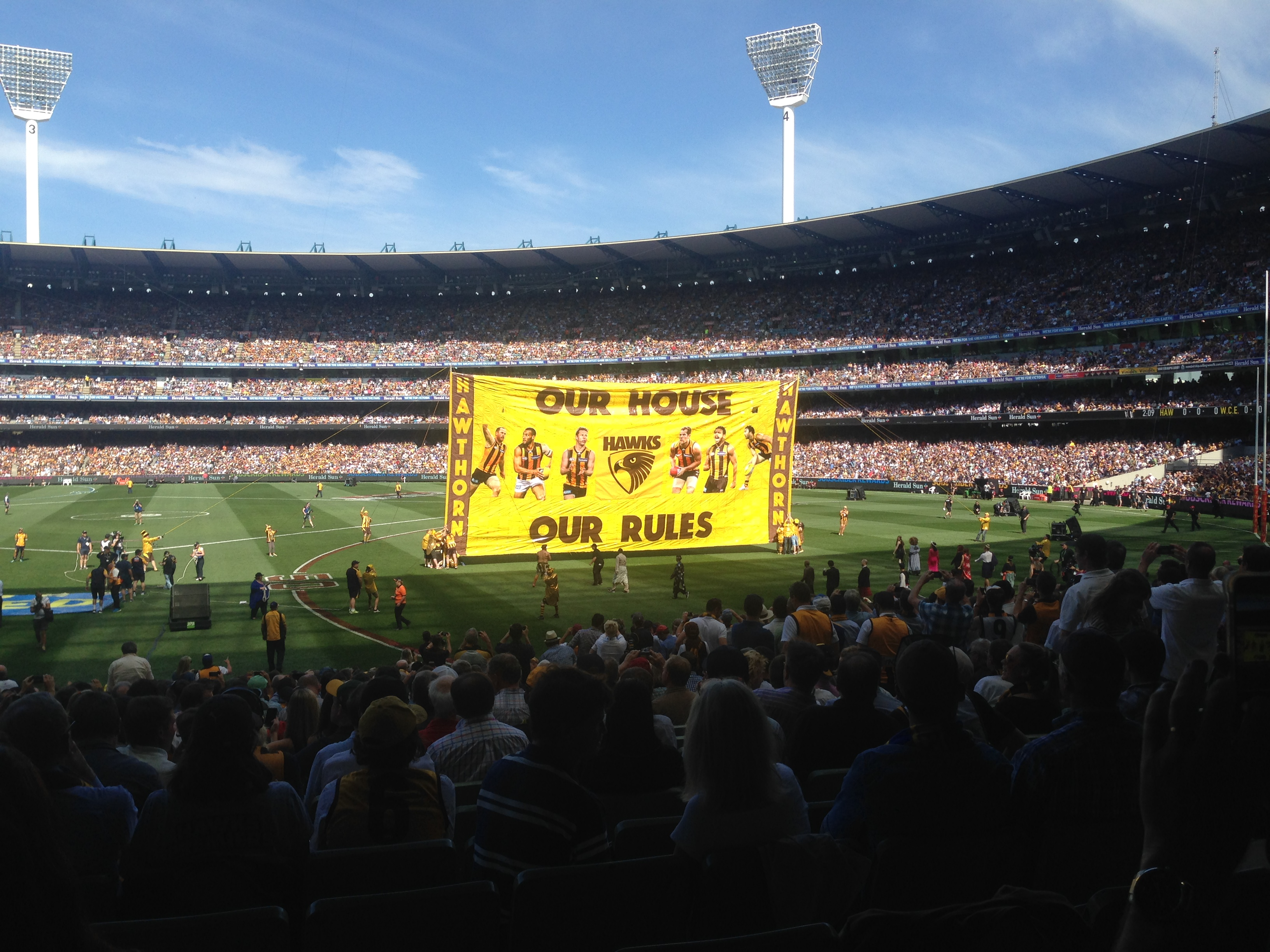
Hawthorn's banner. The message, "Our House, Our Rules", refers to the fact that the MCG is Hawthorn's home ground.

Similar to previous grand finals, the grand final provided both pre-match and post-match entertainment, with English singer Ellie Goulding, Canadian musician Bryan Adams and American musician Chris Isaak performing on the day. Australian singer Kate Ceberano performed the national anthem, and musician Mike Brady performed his famous football song, "Up There Cazaly" as he had done at several grand finals before and since.

For the first time, the day before the grand final was declared a public holiday in Victoria by the incoming Daniel Andrews government, as promised during the campaigning for the 2014 Victorian state election. As this reduced the number of workers in the Melbourne City Centre, the traditional route for the Grand Final Parade was changed to leave from the Old Treasury Building and finish at Yarra Park, adjacent to the Melbourne Cricket Ground. A record crowd of 150,000 people turned up to watch the parade.

== Match summary ==
The game was played on a very hot day, with the temperature reaching 31.3 °C or 88.3 °F at 3:28 pm. This broke the previous record high for a grand final of 30.7 °C or 87.3 °F in 1987. It was thought that the conditions would favour West Coast, after Hawthorn had played a tough finals campaign of three successive finals, including travelling to Perth twice, without having a week off. The Eagles, being based in Perth, were also generally more used to playing in warmer conditions than Hawthorn.

=== First quarter ===
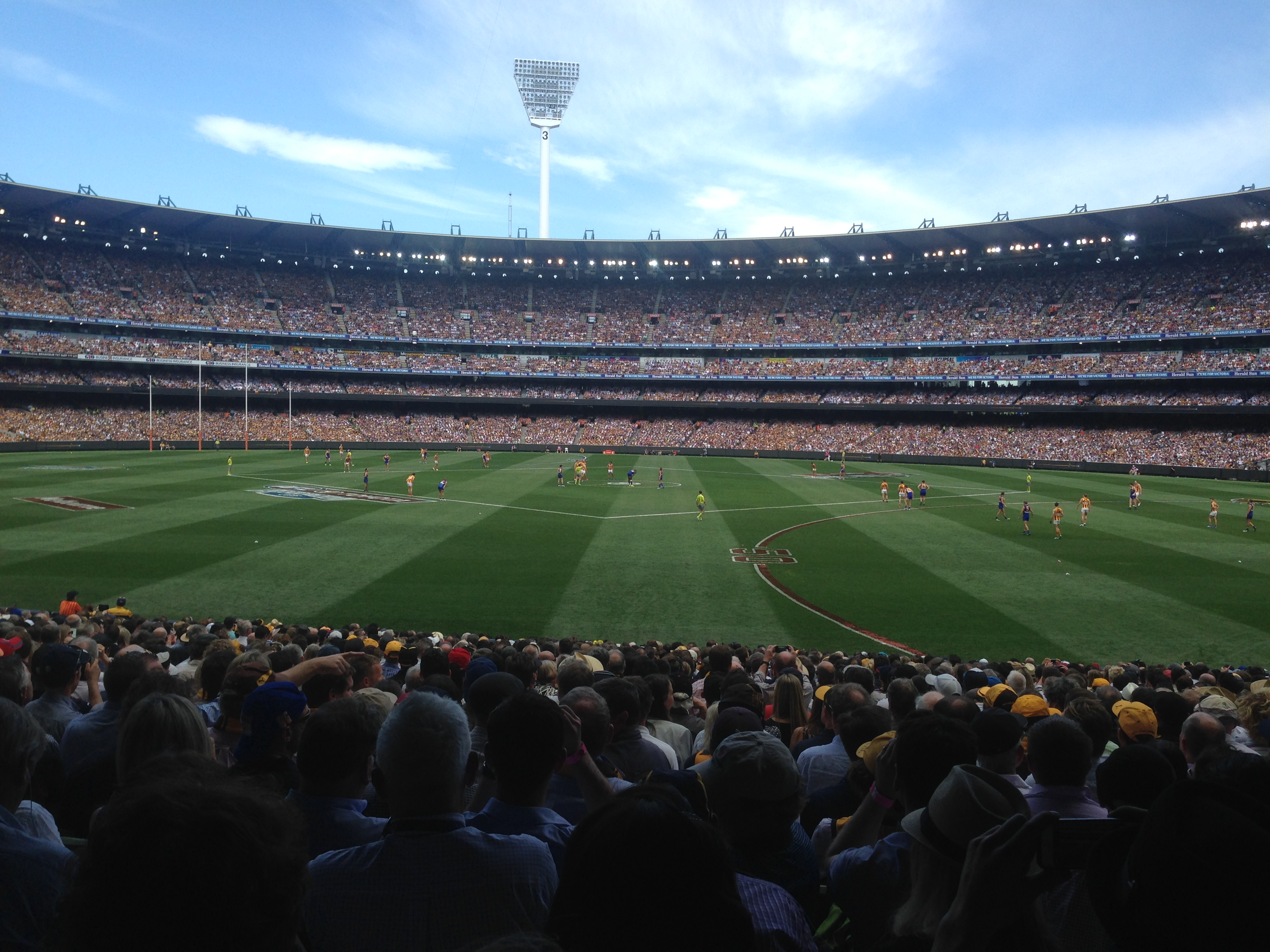
The ground moments before the first bounce. Hawthorn are in predominantly gold and West Coast are wearing predominantly blue.

Luke Shuey kicked the first goal two minutes into the game for West Coast from a free kick awarded against Jordan Lewis. Hawthorn's Cyril Rioli responded only 90 seconds later and the Hawks kicked the next four goals of the quarter, with Ben McEvoy, Rioli, Grant Birchall and Bradley Hill each kicking goals. Meanwhile, the Eagles wasted opportunities, with Shuey ignoring a handball to an open Jamie Cripps in front of goal in preference to a dribbled kick that missed. West Coast's Jack Darling also missed a goal at the thirteen-minute mark. At quarter time, Hawthorn 5.0 (30) led West Coast 1.5 (11) by 19 points, despite having fewer scoring shots.

=== Second quarter ===
Hawthorn dominated the first half of the second quarter. Hawthorn captain Luke Hodge kicked the first goal in the first minute of the term with a checkside kick from hard against the boundary line in the forward pocket. The Eagles continued to waste opportunities, with captain Shannon Hurn hitting the post from directly in front of goals at the six-minute mark. This was followed by a burst of three goals in seven minutes from the Hawks, with Jack Gunston kicking two and Isaac Smith one. By the 13th minute of the quarter, Hawthorn had kicked the last nine goals and held a 44-point lead, Hawthorn 9.2 (56) to West Coast 1.6 (12).

West Coast finally kicked its second goal in the 16th minute, Josh Hill kicking the goal. Two more behinds followed, before Elliot Yeo kicked another for West Coast from a set shot after the siren. West Coast's late scores narrowed the margin to 31 points; Hawthorn 9.3 (57), West Coast 3.8 (26).

=== Third quarter ===
The two teams traded goals in the first half of the quarter as the Eagles made a challenge to get back into the game. Darling kicked the first goal of the third quarter for the Eagles in the 5th minute, before the Eagles squandered two good opportunities inside forward 50: one when Shuey turned the ball over by kick when he had a handball option available, and one when Darling dropped a simple chest mark which would have resulted in a set shot. Ryan Schoenmakers kicked a goal for Hawthorn in the 11th minute, and Mark Hutchings kicked a goal for West Coast in the 14th minute, narrowing the margin to 25 points.

Hawthorn then dominated the latter half of the third quarter, kicking four goals in twelve minutes to extend the lead to a match-winning 50 points. Gunston kicked two goals in three minutes (17th minute and 19th minute), followed by Smith (22nd minute) and substitute Matt Suckling (28th minute). At three-quarter time, Hawthorn 14.5 (89) led West Coast 5.9 (39).

=== Final quarter ===
Hawthorn kicked the first two goals of the final quarter, to Jarryd Roughead in the 3rd minute and Smith in the 5th minute, extending the margin to 61. Hawthorn full-back Brian Lake made a diving smother to prevent a certain Josh Hill goal for the Eagles soon after. The next fifteen minutes of the term were goalless before the Eagles added three goals in time-on (one to Mark LeCras and two to Jeremy McGovern) to reduce the final margin to 46 points. Hawthorn 16.11 (107) defeated West Coast 8.13 (61).

=== Overall report ===
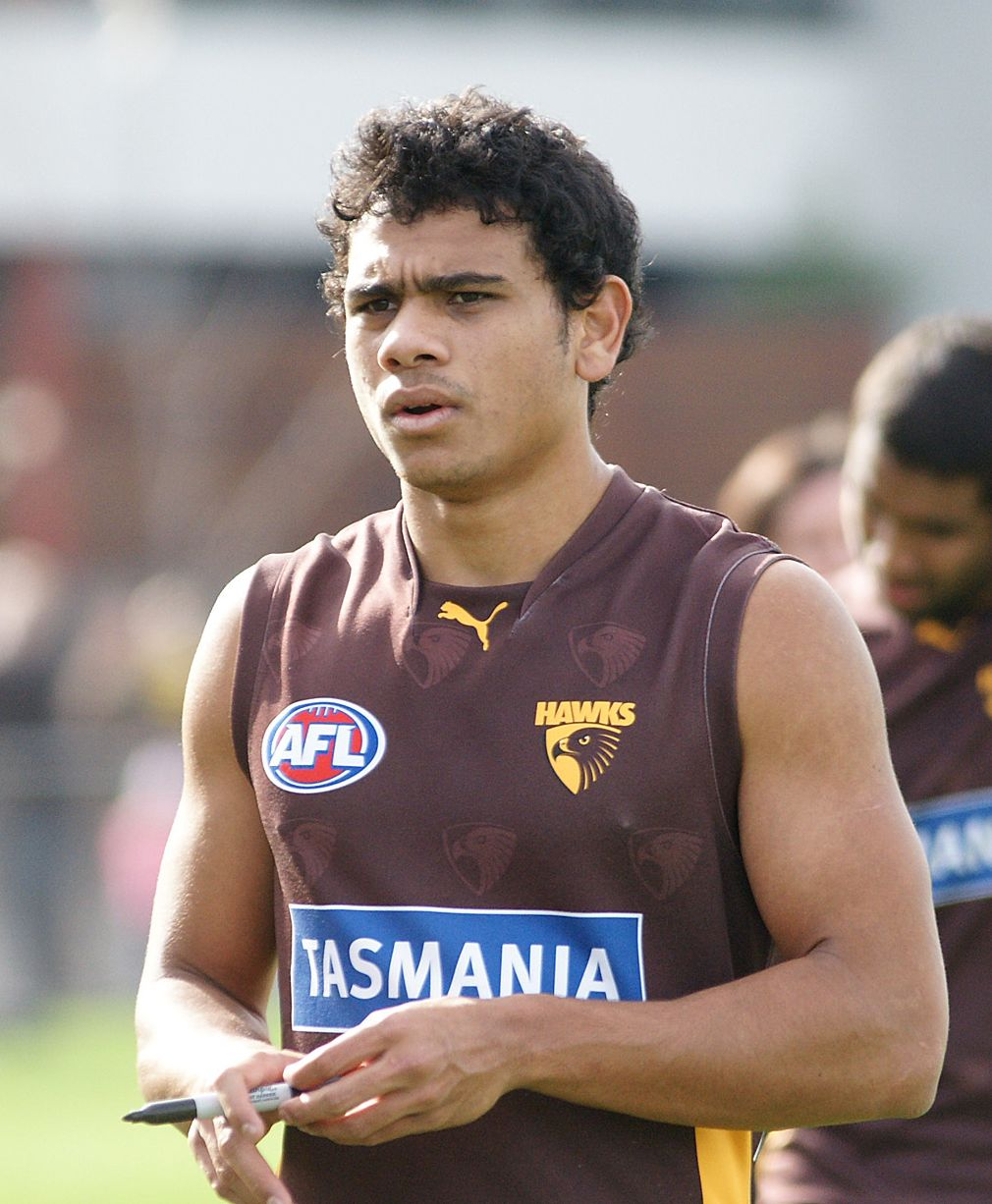
Cyril Rioli, winner of the Norm Smith Medal

Hawthorn dominated the key statistical indicators across the ground, winning inside 50s 59–40, contested possessions 136–120, overall disposals 436–321 and tackles 59–45. West Coast largely tentative and used the ball poorly, leading clangers 50–44. Hawthorn's goalkicking was very accurate when the game was still in the balance – at one point its score was 16.5 (101) to West Coast's 5.11 (41), before adding six behinds late in the final quarter.

Among the best for Hawthorn were Rioli (18 disposals, 12 marks, two goals and four goal assists), Sam Mitchell (34 touches, six clearances), James Frawley (22 disposals, 11 marks and kept Eagles forward Josh Kennedy goalless), Hodge (30 disposals, 8 marks), Smith (three goals and 23 disposals), Shaun Burgoyne (26 disposals), Josh Gibson (29 disposals and 8 marks) and Gunston (four goals). Andrew Gaff was the best for the Eagles with 34 disposals.

Hawthorn became only the fifth club and sixth team in VFL/AFL history to win a hat-trick of premierships, and the first to do so since the Brisbane Lions in 2001, 2002 and 2003. Seven Hawthorn players became four-time premiership winners: Rioli, Lewis, Mitchell, Roughead, Birchall and Hodge all with Hawthorn, and Burgoyne adding a third Hawthorn premiership to the premiership he won with Port Adelaide in 2004. Alastair Clarkson also won his fourth premiership as coach of Hawthorn, making him the 12th four-time VFL/AFL premiership coach. The match was Hawthorn's last finals victory until 2024.

=== Norm Smith Medal ===
Norm Smith Medal voting tally
Position	Player	Club	Total votes	Voting summary
1st (winner)	Cyril Rioli	Hawthorn	13	3,3,3,2,2
2nd	Sam Mitchell	Hawthorn	9	3,3,2,1
3rd	James Frawley	Hawthorn	4	2,1,1
4th	Luke Hodge	Hawthorn	2	2
5th - tied	Shaun Burgoyne	Hawthorn	1	1
5th - tied	Isaac Smith	Hawthorn	1	1

Cyril Rioli was named the Norm Smith Medallist (best on ground). Rioli polled 13 votes out of a possible 15, beating his teammate Sam Mitchell who had nine votes. Rioli emulated his uncles Maurice Rioli and Michael Long, who had won the medal in 1982 and 1993 respectively.

Chaired by Peter Bell, the voters and their choices were as follows:

Voter	Role	3 votes	2 votes	1 vote
Peter Bell	6PR	Cyril Rioli	Sam Mitchell	Shaun Burgoyne
Dermott Brereton	Fox Footy	Sam Mitchell	Cyril Rioli	James Frawley
Peter Lalor	The Australian	Cyril Rioli	Luke Hodge	James Frawley
Guy McKenna	ABC	Cyril Rioli	James Frawley	Sam Mitchell
Mark Thompson	Former AFL Player	Sam Mitchell	Cyril Rioli	Isaac Smith

== Teams ==
The teams were announced on 1 October 2015. Hawthorn made one change to its lineup from the previous week's preliminary final, with Jack Gunston returning from an ankle injury and Billy Hartung omitted. West Coast named an unchanged team from its preliminary final.

Matt Rosa was the substitute for West Coast and Matt Suckling filled that role for Hawthorn. The 2015 grand final was the last AFL match to utilise substitutions until the 2021 season, the AFL reverting to a four-man interchange bench from the 2016 AFL season onwards.

Hawthorn	West Coast

Hawthorn
B:	24 Ben Stratton	17 Brian Lake	12 James Frawley
HB:	14 Grant Birchall	6 Josh Gibson	9 Shaun Burgoyne
C:	10 Bradley Hill	5 Sam Mitchell	16 Isaac Smith
HF:	33 Cyril Rioli	25 Ryan Schoenmakers	28 Paul Puopolo
F:	22 Luke Breust	2 Jarryd Roughead	19 Jack Gunston
Foll:	20 David Hale	15 Luke Hodge (c)	3 Jordan Lewis
Int:	26 Liam Shiels	8 Taylor Duryea	7 Ben McEvoy
Int:	4 Matt Suckling (sub)		
Coach:	Alastair Clarkson		

West Coast
B:	12 Sharrod Wellingham	31 Will Schofield	25 Shannon Hurn (c)
HB:	26 Sam Butler	20 Jeremy McGovern	5 Brad Sheppard
C:	7 Chris Masten	11 Matt Priddis	6 Elliot Yeo
HF:	3 Andrew Gaff	27 Jack Darling	15 Jamie Cripps
F:	2 Mark LeCras	17 Josh Kennedy	33 Josh Hill
Foll:	9 Nic Naitanui	34 Mark Hutchings	13 Luke Shuey
Int:	18 Xavier Ellis	22 Callum Sinclair	4 Dom Sheed
Int:	24 Matt Rosa (sub)		
Coach:	Adam Simpson		

Umpires

The umpiring panel, comprising three field umpires, four boundary umpires, two goal umpires and an emergency in each position is given below. The most notable appointment was field umpire Jeff Dalgleish's selection for his first grand final.

2015 AFL Grand Final umpires
Position					Emergency
Field:	8 Brett Rosebury (7)	9 Matt Stevic (3)	7 Jeff Dalgleish (1)		Ray Chamberlain
Boundary:	Nathan Doig (4)	Ian Burrows (6)	Chris Gordon (2)	Matthew Tomkins (2)	Michael Marantelli
Goal:	Adam Wojcik (2)	Chris Appleton (2)			Luke Walker

Numbers in brackets represent the number of Grand Finals umpired, including 2015.

== Scorecard ==
Grand Final
Saturday, 3 October (2:30 pm)	Hawthorn	def.	West Coast	MCG (crowd: 98,633)	Report
5.0 (30); 9.3 (57); 14.5 (89); 16.11 (107)	Q1; Q2; Q3; Final	1.5 (11); 3.8 (26); 5.9 (39); 8.13 (61)	Umpires: Brett Rosebury, Matt Stevic, Jeff Dalgleish; Norm Smith Medal: Cyril Rioli; Television broadcast: Seven Network; National anthem: Kate Ceberano
Gunston 4 Smith 3 Rioli 2 Hodge, Roughead, Birchall, Schoenmakers, Hill, McEvoy, Suckling 1	Goals	2 McGovern; 1 Darling, Hill, Hutchings, LeCras, Shuey, Yeo
Rioli, Mitchell, Smith, Hodge, Gunston, Burgoyne, Frawley	Best	Gaff, Shuey, Butler, Hutchings, Priddis

== Strikes in the lead-up ==
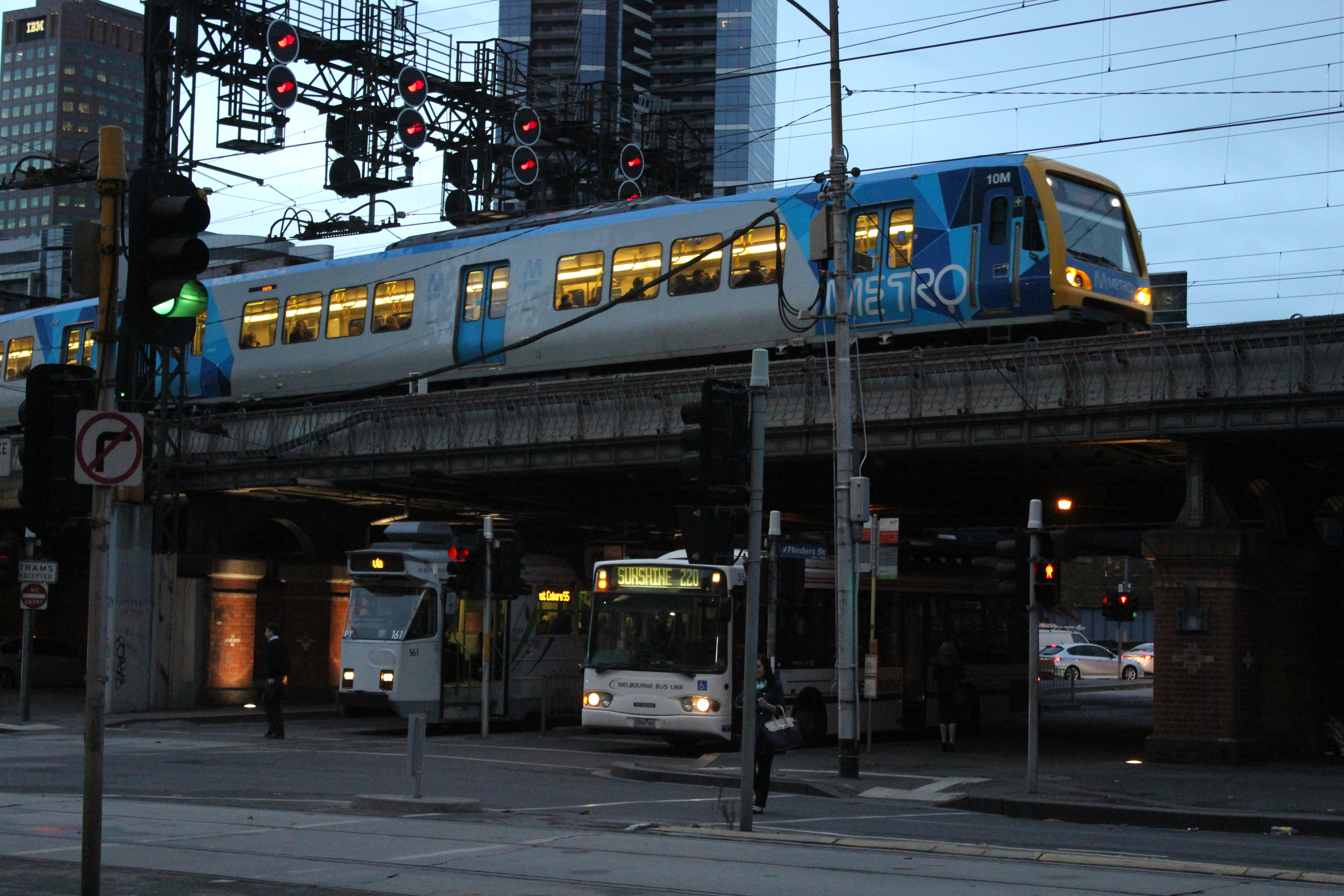
Various strike actions by workers in Victoria, particularly those affecting transport, had potential to affect the 2015 AFL Grand Final

More than 180 brewery workers at the Carlton & United Breweries (CUB) factory in Abbotsford, Victoria voted to go on strike in the lead up to the 2015 AFL Grand Final. It was feared that this could potentially affect the production of Carlton Draught and Victoria Bitter in the lead up to the game, although the brewery stated that a strike would not cause any loss of production, and that Carlton & United could potentially request supplies from its other factories during a strike if production was lost.

Also affecting Melbourne in late 2015 was a series of transport strikes. Strikes by tram and train drivers against Yarra Trams and Metro Trains Melbourne during finals were threatened, with CFMEU Secretary John Setka declaring that the finals were a "wonderful time to have some industrial action".

== Media coverage ==
The match was televised by the Seven Network. The match commentary was conducted by Bruce McAvaney and Dennis Cometti for the Seven Network, marking the duo's seventh grand final appearance together as commentators since 2008 and their eleventh overall. Individually, it was Cometti's seventeenth grand final and McAvaney's fifteenth.

The match was shown on Seven's main channel and also their high-definition channel, 7mate. A total of 2,640,000 people across the two channels watched the match, making the Grand Final the most viewed television broadcast of the day.
