= 1990 Hawthorn Football Club season =

66th season in the Australian Football League

Hawthorn Football Club
1990 season
- President: Trevor Coote
- Coach: Allan Jeans
- Captain: Michael Tuck
- Home ground: Princes Park; Waverley Park
- AFL season: 14–8 (5th)
- Finals series: Elimination final (lost to Melbourne 64–73)
- Best and Fairest: Andrew Collins
- Leading goalkicker: Jason Dunstall (83)
- Highest home attendance: 53,982 (round 20 vs. Collingwood)
- Lowest home attendance: 8,649 (Round 4 vs. Brisbane Bears)
- Average home attendance: 24,327

The 1990 season was the Hawthorn Football Club's 66th season in the newly named Australian Football League and 89th overall. Hawthorn entered the season as the two-time defending Premiers, having won back-to-back premierships.

== Fixture ==
=== Premiership season ===
Rd	Date and local time	Opponent	Scores (Hawthorn's scores indicated in bold)			Venue	Attendance	Record
Rd	Date and local time	Opponent	Home	Away	Result	Venue	Attendance	Record
1	Saturday, 31 March (2:10 pm)	Geelong	11.11 (77)	**28.24 (192)**	Won by 115 points	Waverley Park (A)	41,694	1–0
2	Saturday, 8 April (2:10 pm)	Essendon	24.15 (159)	**14.13 (97)**	Lost by 62 points	Melbourne Cricket Ground (A)	55,311	1–1
3	Saturday, 14 April (2:10 pm)	Richmond	**15.21 (111)**	10.21 (81)	Won by 30 points	Princes Park (H)	11,698	2–1
4	Saturday, 21 April (2:10 pm)	Brisbane Bears	**18.12 (120)**	5.8 (38)	Won by 82 points	Princess Park (H)	8,649	3–1
5	Saturday, 28 April (2:10 pm)	North Melbourne	**16.12 (108)**	10.18 (78)	Won by 30 points	Princess Park (H)	13,144	4–1
6	Saturday, 5 May (2:10 pm)	St Kilda	15.14 (104)	**14.17 (101)**	Lost by 3 points	Moorabbin Oval (A)	30,895	4–2
7	Saturday, 12 May (2:10 pm)	Collingwood	13.14 (92)	**13.16 (94)**	Won by 2 points	Waverley Park (A)	48,099	5–2
8	Saturday, 19 May (2:10 pm)	Carlton	18.18 (126)	**9.5 (59)**	Lost by 67 points	Waverley Park (A)	36,370	5–3
9	Saturday, 26 May (2:10 pm)	Melbourne	**14.8 (92)**	7.6 (48)	Won by 44 points	Waverley Park (H)	39,701	6–3
10	Saturday, 2 June (2:10 pm)	Fitzroy	15.13 (103)	**13.11 (89)**	Lost by 14 points	Princes Park (A)	11,329	6–4
11	Saturday, 9 June (2:10 pm)	Sydney	**19.18 (132)**	11.17 (83)	Won by 49 points	Princes Park (H)	11,848	7–4
12	Friday, 15 June (7:40 pm)	West Coast	16.9 (105)	**12.10 (82)**	Lost by 23 points	WACA (A)	28,094	7–5
13	Saturday, 30 June (2:10 pm)	Footscray	**10.13 (73)**	14.7 (91)	Lost by 18 points	Waverley Park (H)	22,388	7–6
14	Saturday, 7 July (2:10 pm)	Geelong	**18.10 (118)**	7.8 (50)	Won by 68 points	Waverley Park (H)	30,211	8–6
15	Saturday, 14 July (2:10 pm)	Essendon	**10.7 (67)**	21.16 (142)	Lost by 75 points	Princes Park (H)	25,159	8–7
16	Saturday, 21 July (2:10 pm)	Richmond	10.8 (68)	**25.9 (159)**	Won by 91 points	Melbourne Cricket Ground (A)	25,532	9–7
17	Sunday, 29 July (2:10 pm)	Brisbane Bears	14.11 (95)	**16.14 (110)**	Won by 15 points	Carrara Stadium (A)	8,768	10–7
18	Friday, 3 August (7:40 pm)	North Melbourne	14.14 (98)	**15.18 (108)**	Won by 10 points	Melbourne Cricket Ground (A)	44,627	11–7
19	Saturday, 11 August (2:10 pm)	St Kilda	**17.17 (119)**	13.5 (83)	Won by 36 points	Waverley Park (H)	27,612	12–7
20	Saturday, 18 August (2:10 pm)	Collingwood	**26.7 (163)**	12.8 (80)	Won by 83 points	Waverley Park (H)	53,982	13–7
21	Saturday, 25 August (2:10 pm)	Carlton	**17.14 (116)**	12.13 (85)	Won by 31 points	Princes Park (H)	23,200	14–7
22	Saturday, 1 September (2:10 pm)	Melbourne	17.14 (116)	**15.14 (104)**	Lost by 12 points	Melbourne Cricket Ground (A)	57,247	14–8

=== Finals series ===
Rd	Date and local time	Opponent	Scores (Hawthorn's scores indicated in bold)			Venue	Attendance
Rd	Date and local time	Opponent	Home	Away	Result	Venue	Attendance
Elimination final	Sunday, 9 September (2:30 pm)	Melbourne	10.13 (73)	**8.16 (64)**	Lost by 9 points	Melbourne Cricket Ground (A)	74,954

== Ladder ==
(P)	Premiers
	Qualified for finals

#	Team	P	W	L	D	PF	PA	%	Pts
1	Essendon	22	17	5	0	2526	1815	139.2	68
2	Collingwood (P)	22	16	6	0	2376	1825	130.2	64
3	West Coast	22	16	6	0	2274	1920	118.4	64
4	Melbourne	22	16	6	0	2339	2066	113.2	64
5	Hawthorn	22	14	8	0	2414	2002	120.6	56
6	North Melbourne	22	12	10	0	2519	2210	114.0	48
7	Footscray	22	12	10	0	2016	2031	99.3	48
8	Carlton	22	11	11	0	2277	2187	104.1	44
9	St Kilda	22	9	13	0	2328	2313	100.6	36
10	Geelong	22	8	14	0	2248	2398	93.7	32
11	Richmond	22	7	15	0	1988	2530	78.6	28
12	Fitzroy	22	7	15	0	1874	2389	78.4	28
13	Sydney	22	5	17	0	1904	2704	70.4	20
14	Brisbane Bears	22	4	18	0	1733	2426	71.4	16

Rules for classification: 1. premiership points; 2. percentage; 3. points for
Average score: 100.1
Source: AFL Tables
