= Darren Minchington =

Australian rules footballer (born 1993)

Personal information
- Full name: Darren Minchington
- Born: 9 December 1993 (age 32)
- Original team: Dandenong Stingrays (TAC Cup)
- Draft: No. 65, 2012 rookie draft
- Debut: Round 20, 2013, St Kilda vs. Hawthorn, at Etihad Stadium
- Height: 179 cm (5 ft 10 in)
- Weight: 82 kg (181 lb)
- Position: Forward

Playing career^{1}
Years	Club	Games (Goals)
2012–2018	St Kilda	28 (22)
2019–2020	Hawthorn	4 (2)
Total		32 (24)
- ^{1} Playing statistics correct to the end of 2020.

Darren Minchington is a former Australian rules football player who played with the St Kilda Football Club and Hawthorn Football Club in the Australian Football League.

== AFL career ==
He made his debut on 9 August 2013 against Hawthorn in Round 20 of the 2013 AFL season.

Originally from Dromana, Victoria, Minchington attended Padua College. He started his senior football career at St Kilda's VFL affiliate club Sandringham in 2012, but suffered a hip injury after playing nine games, ending his season. He kicked two goals in two games for the St Kilda Football Club. He was dropped after his second game against the Sydney Swans.

Munchington has had a career ridden with injuries over seven season career at St Kilda, he only played 28 games at AFL level.

Minchington was delisted at the end of the 2018 season, and signed with Hawthorn as a delisted free agent. He was delisted from Hawthorn a year later without playing a game.

Minchington signed a one-year rookie contract as part of the pre-season supplemental selection period (SSP) following a long-term knee injury to Will Golds. Minchington made his Hawks debut and played his first AFL game since round 10, 2017. He was selected to play Melbourne at the Sydney Showground Stadium. Minchington was delisted at the conclusion of the 2020 AFL season, after playing 4 games with the Hawks.

== Statistics ==
Legend
G	Goals	K	Kicks	D	Disposals	T	Tackles
B	Behinds	H	Handballs	M	Marks

Season	Team	No.	Games	Totals							Averages (per game)							Votes
Season	Team	No.	Games	G	B	K	H	D	M	T	G	B	K	H	D	M	T	Votes
2012	St Kilda	41	0	—	—	—	—	—	—	—	—	—	—	—	—	—	—	—
2013	St Kilda	41	2	2	1	10	7	17	8	2	1.0	0.5	5.0	3.5	8.5	4.0	1.0	0
2014	St Kilda	41	3	4	1	20	8	28	7	4	1.3	0.3	6.7	2.7	9.3	2.3	1.3	0
2015	St Kilda	41	5	6	4	24	23	47	10	15	1.2	0.8	4.8	4.6	9.4	2.0	3.0	0
2016	St Kilda	41	13	6	5	63	83	146	26	54	0.5	0.4	4.8	6.4	11.2	2.0	4.2	0
2017	St Kilda	41	5	4	4	29	40	69	13	20	0.8	0.8	5.8	8.0	13.8	2.6	4.0	0
2018	St Kilda	41	0	—	—	—	—	—	—	—	—	—	—	—	—	—	—	—
2019	Hawthorn	38	0	—	—	—	—	—	—	—	—	—	—	—	—	—	—	—
2020 (Note: The 2020 season was played with 17 home-and-away matches per team (down from 22) and 16-minute quarters with time on (down from 20-minute quarters with time on) due to the impact of the COVID-19 pandemic.)	Hawthorn	38	4	2	2	24	15	39	6	5	0.5	0.5	6.0	3.8	9.8	1.5	1.3	0
Career			32	24	17	170	176	346	70	100	0.8	0.5	5.3	5.5	10.8	2.2	3.1	0
