= Taylor Duryea =

Australian rules footballer (born 1991)

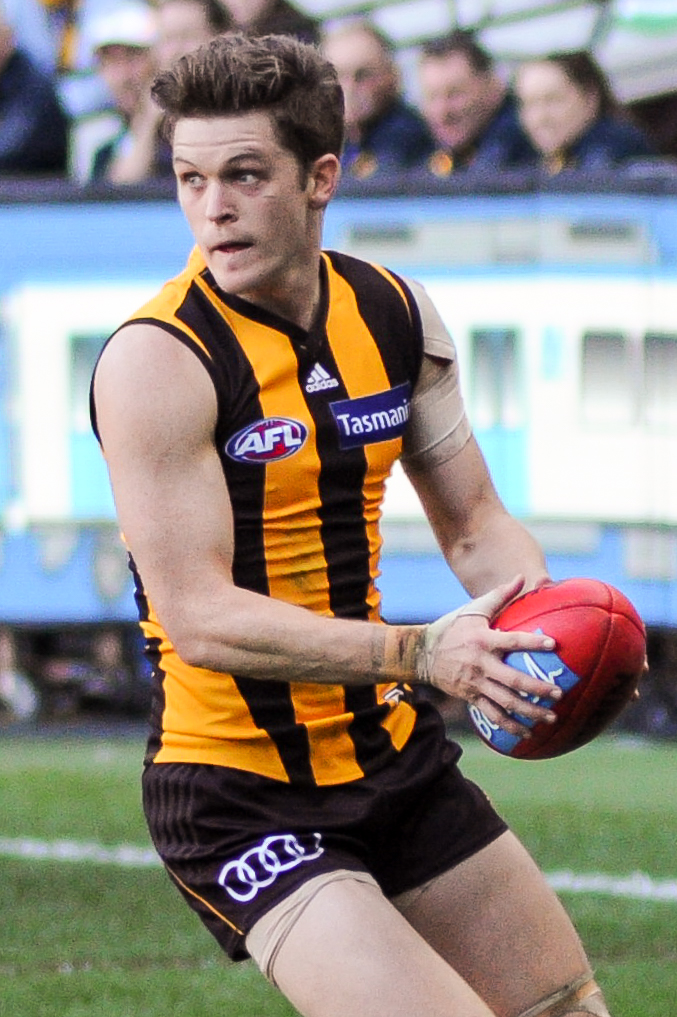
- Duryea playing for Hawthorn in June 2017

Personal information
- Full name: Taylor Duryea
- Nickname: Doc
- Born: 24 April 1991 (age 35)
- Original teams: Wahgunyah (CDFL), Murray Bushrangers
- Draft: No. 69, 2009 national draft (Hawthorn); No. 21, 2024 rookie draft (Western Bulldogs)
- Debut: Round 3, 2013, Hawthorn vs. Collingwood, at Melbourne Cricket Ground
- Height: 181 cm (5 ft 11 in)
- Weight: 79 kg (174 lb)
- Position: Defender

Club information
- Current club: Western Bulldogs
- Number: 15

Playing career^{1}
Years	Club	Games (Goals)
2010–2018	Hawthorn	118 (21)
2019–2025	Western Bulldogs	101 (4)
Total		219 (25)
- ^{1} Playing statistics correct to the end of the 2025 season.

Career highlights
- 2× AFL premiership player: 2014, 2015; 2× VFL premiership player: 2013, 2025

Taylor Duryea (born 24 April 1991) is a retired Australian rules footballer who played for Hawthorn and the Western Bulldogs in the Australian Football League (AFL).

== Early football ==
Duryrea was raised in Corowa, New South Wales and played junior football in Waygunyah across the Victorian border.

Moving to Melbourne to finish his schooling at Caulfield Grammar he played junior representative football for the NSW/ACT Rams.

Duryea initially played with Wahgunyah in the Coreen & District Football League, winning back-to-back Coreen & DFL Thirds best and fairest awards in 2004 and 2005.

== AFL career ==
=== Hawthorn (2010–2018) ===
Duryea was drafted with No. 69 in the 2009 AFL draft, being a fifth round selection.

Tried as a small forward when he first arrived at Hawthorn, he has switched to the backline and has carried out a similar playmaking role to Matt Suckling and Brent Guerra. A knee injury to Suckling helped open up an opportunity for Duryea to debut against Collingwood in Round 3 of the 2013 AFL season.

Duryea played 18 games in 2013 and won the "Best first year player" award.

Duryea played 23 of a possible 25 matches in 2014. With the retirement of Brent Guerra at the end of the previous season, a spot opened up for the young Hawk. He was noted for his skills in rebound defence. He showed good form throughout the 2014 finals series and earned himself a premiership medal.

On 9 October 2017, Duryea signed a one–year deal to remain at the club until the end of 2018.

=== Western Bulldogs (2019–2025) ===
On 16 October 2018, Duryea was traded to the Western Bulldogs.

Duryea re-signed with the Bulldogs for one year on 19 November 2020.

He averaged 16.7 disposals, 5.6 marks and 2.6 rebound 50s across seven games in red, white and blue in 2024.

== Statistics ==
Updated to the end of the 2025 season.

Legend
G	Goals	K	Kicks	D	Disposals	T	Tackles
B	Behinds	H	Handballs	M	Marks
#	Played in that season's premiership team

Season	Team	No.	Games	Totals							Averages (per game)							Votes
Season	Team	No.	Games	G	B	K	H	D	M	T	G	B	K	H	D	M	T	Votes
2010	Hawthorn	41	0	—	—	—	—	—	—	—	—	—	—	—	—	—	—	0
2011	Hawthorn	41	0	—	—	—	—	—	—	—	—	—	—	—	—	—	—	0
2012	Hawthorn	41	0	—	—	—	—	—	—	—	—	—	—	—	—	—	—	0
2013	Hawthorn	41	18	0	3	160	83	243	72	45	0.0	0.2	8.9	4.6	13.5	4.0	2.5	0
2014^{#}	Hawthorn	8	23	6	2	216	132	348	102	41	0.3	0.1	9.4	5.7	15.1	4.4	1.8	0
2015^{#}	Hawthorn	8	22	6	2	281	111	392	156	47	0.3	0.1	12.8	5.0	17.8	7.1	2.1	0
2016	Hawthorn	8	23	2	4	267	119	386	127	44	0.1	0.2	11.6	5.2	16.8	5.5	1.9	0
2017	Hawthorn	8	15	6	9	130	86	216	75	41	0.4	0.6	8.7	5.7	14.4	5.0	2.7	0
2018	Hawthorn	8	17	1	7	159	100	259	79	33	0.1	0.4	9.4	5.9	15.2	4.6	1.9	0
2019	Western Bulldogs	15	14	2	1	193	72	265	82	28	0.1	0.1	13.8	5.1	18.9	5.9	2.0	0
2020 (Note: The 2020 season was played with 17 home-and-away matches per team (down from 22) and 16-minute quarters with time on (down from 20-minute quarters with time on) due to the impact of the COVID-19 pandemic.)	Western Bulldogs	15	3	0	0	35	12	47	13	9	0.0	0.0	11.7	4.0	15.7	4.3	3.0	0
2021	Western Bulldogs	15	25	1	0	281	156	437	132	48	0.0	0.0	11.2	6.2	17.5	5.3	1.9	0
2022	Western Bulldogs	15	12	1	0	104	54	158	70	15	0.1	0.0	8.7	4.5	13.2	5.8	1.3	0
2023	Western Bulldogs	15	20	0	1	147	93	240	84	40	0.0	0.1	7.4	4.7	12.0	4.2	2.0	0
2024	Western Bulldogs	15	22	0	3	194	124	318	111	49	0.0	0.1	8.8	5.6	14.5	5.0	2.2	0
2025	Western Bulldogs	15	5	0	0	32	22	54	19	9	0.0	0.0	6.4	4.4	10.8	3.8	1.8	0
Career			219	25	32	2199	1164	3363	1122	449	0.1	0.1	10.0	5.3	15.4	5.1	2.1	0

== Honours and achievements ==
Team

- 2× AFL premiership player (Hawthorn): 2014, 2015
- Minor premiership (Hawthorn): 2013
- VFL premiership player (Box Hill): 2013
- VFL premiership player: (Footscray): 2025
- Minor premiership (Box Hill): 2015
