= Josh Morris (Australian footballer) =

Australian rules footballer

Personal information
- Full name: Josh Morris
- Born: 7 November 2001 (age 24)
- Original team: Woodville-West Torrens
- Draft: No. 57, 2019 national draft
- Debut: Round 6, 2020, Hawthorn vs. Collingwood, at Spotless Stadium
- Height: 186 cm (6 ft 1 in)
- Weight: 76 kg (168 lb)
- Position: Forward

Playing career^{1}
Years	Club	Games (Goals)
2020–2023	Hawthorn	15 (1)
- ^{1} Playing statistics correct to the end of the 2023 season.

Career highlights

Josh Morris (born 7 November 2001) is a professional Australian rules footballer who most recently played with the Hawthorn Football Club in the Australian Football League (AFL). Hawthorn selected Morris with Pick 57 in the 2019 AFL draft.

== Early career ==
A fast leading and dangerous forward, Morris played for Woodville-West Torrens in the SANFL Reserves competition in 2019, where he averaged eight disposals across his five outings.

== AFL career ==
Morris's AFL career was initially hampered by the COVID-19 pandemic. As a young player coming into the system Morris would normally start by playing with the Hawthorn affiliate Box Hill Hawks, but because that competition had been suspended for the year he had to show his metal with scratch matches against other AFL clubs.

Morris made his AFL debut in round 6, 2020, against Collingwood at GIANTS Stadium.

In 2022 the Box Hill coaches played him as a defender. After strong patch of form he was promoted to AFL. He strung 6 games together before an injury to his shoulder that required surgery.

== Statistics ==
Updated to the end of the 2023 season.

Legend
G	Goals	K	Kicks	D	Disposals	T	Tackles
B	Behinds	H	Handballs	M	Marks

Season	Team	No.	Games	Totals							Averages (per game)							Votes
Season	Team	No.	Games	G	B	K	H	D	M	T	G	B	K	H	D	M	T	Votes
2020 (Note: The 2020 season was played with 17 home-and-away matches per team (down from 22) and 16-minute quarters with time on (down from 20-minute quarters with time on) due to the impact of the COVID-19 pandemic.)	Hawthorn	35	4	1	2	14	9	23	5	6	0.3	0.5	3.5	2.2	5.8	1.3	1.5	0
2021	Hawthorn	35	5	0	1	4	2	6	1	5	0.0	0.2	0.8	0.4	1.2	0.2	1.0	0
2022	Hawthorn	35	6	0	0	26	20	46	8	4	0.0	0.0	4.3	3.3	7.7	1.3	0.7	0
2023	Hawthorn	35	0	—	—	—	—	—	—	—	—	—	—	—	—	—	—	0
Career			15	1	3	44	31	75	14	15	0.1	0.2	2.9	2.1	5.0	0.9	1.0	0
