= Harry Jones (footballer, born 1999) =

Australian rules footballer (born 1999)

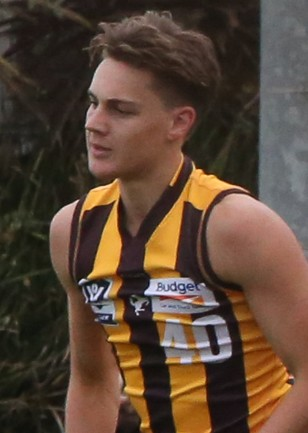
- Jones playing for Box Hill in May 2018

Personal information
- Full name: Harrison Jones
- Born: 15 March 1999 (age 27)
- Original team: Murray Bushrangers
- Draft: No. 7, 2017 rookie draft
- Debut: 5 July 2020, Hawthorn vs. Greater Western Sydney, at Spotless Stadium
- Height: 185 cm (6 ft 1 in)
- Weight: 80 kg (176 lb)
- Position: Midfield

Playing career
Years	Club	Games (Goals)
2018–2020	Hawthorn	1 (0)

Career highlights
- John Law Medal: 2021

Harry Jones is an Australian rules footballer who played for the Hawthorn Football Club in the Australian Football League (AFL).

== AFL career ==
Jones was selected by Hawthorn with the 7th pick in the 2017 AFL Rookie Draft. Jones was recruited as a midfielder but the club has helped him develop his defensive game. His first year at Box Hill ended with the need for shoulder surgery. In his second year on the list in 2019, Jones was a pre-season stand-out; he was expected to make his senior debut but a season-ending knee injury (PCL) ruled him out.

Jones made his AFL debut in round 5, 2020, against Greater Western Sydney at Spotless Stadium. He finished his debut season on the injury list. Jones was delisted at the end of the 2020 season.

In 2021, Jones was signed by North Melbourne's VFL side. He was awarded the John Law Medal, the club's best and fairest player in the VFL.

== Personal life ==
Jones is currently studying a Bachelor of Business at Deakin University.

== Statistics ==
Legend
G	Goals	K	Kicks	D	Disposals	T	Tackles
B	Behinds	H	Handballs	M	Marks

Season	Team	No.	Games	Totals							Averages (per game)							Votes
Season	Team	No.	Games	G	B	K	H	D	M	T	G	B	K	H	D	M	T	Votes
2018	Hawthorn	40	0	—	—	—	—	—	—	—	—	—	—	—	—	—	—	0
2019	Hawthorn	40	0	—	—	—	—	—	—	—	—	—	—	—	—	—	—	0
2021	Essendon	23	16	20	6	77	40	117	57	21	1.3	0.4	4.8	2.5	7.3	3.6	1.3	0
2022	Essendon	23	10	13	5	44	32	76	28	14	1.3	0.5	4.4	3.2	7.6	2.8	1.4	0
2023	Essendon	23	5	2	4	29	16	45	21	4	0.4	0.8	5.8	3.2	9.0	4.2	0.8	0
2024	Essendon	23	21	18	11	145	83	228	103	32	0.9	0.5	6.9	4.0	10.9	4.9	1.5	0
2025	Essendon	23	7	2	2	45	26	71	26	19	0.3	0.3	6.4	3.7	10.1	3.7	2.7	0
2026	Essendon	23	5	2	0	27	12	39	16	14	0.4	0.0	5.4	2.4	7.8	3.2	2.8	0
Career			64	57	28	367	209	576	251	104	0.9	0.4	5.7	3.3	9.0	3.9	1.6	0
