= 2006 Hawthorn Football Club season =

82nd season in the Australian Football League

Hawthorn Football Club
2006 season
- President: Jeff Kennett
- Coach: Alastair Clarkson
- Captain: Richie Vandenberg
- Home ground: Melbourne Cricket Ground; Aurora Stadium
- AFL season: 9–13 (11th)
- Finals series: Did not qualify
- Best and Fairest: Sam Mitchell
- Leading goalkicker: Mark Williams (60)
- Highest home attendance: 43,296 (Round 2 vs. Collingwood)
- Lowest home attendance: 12,315 (Round 7 vs. Brisbane Lions)
- Average home attendance: 28,019

The 2006 season was the Hawthorn Football Club's 82nd season in the Australian Football League and their 105th overall.

== Fixture ==
=== Premiership season ===
| Rd | Date and local time | Opponent | Scores (Hawthorn's scores indicated in bold) | | | Venue | Attendance | Record |
| Rd | Date and local time | Opponent | Home | Away | Result | Venue | Attendance | Record |
|---|---|---|---|---|---|---|---|---|
| 1 | Sunday, 2 April (1:10 pm) | Fremantle | **17.7 (109)** | 13.9 (87) | Won by 22 points | Aurora Stadium (H) | 13,862 | 1–0 |
| 2 | Sunday, 9 April (2:10 pm) | Collingwood | **12.12 (84)** | 18.11 (119) | Lost by 35 points | Telstra Dome (H) | 43,296 | 1–1 |
| 3 | Saturday, 15 April (2:10 pm) | Geelong | 6.13 (49) | **15.11 (101)** | Won by 52 points | Skilled Stadium (A) | 24,026 | 2–1 |
| 4 | Friday, 21 April (7:40 pm) | Carlton | 9.14 (68) | **15.10 (100)** | Won by 32 points | Telstra Dome (A) | 45,102 | 3–1 |
| 5 | Sunday, 30 April (2:10 pm) | Essendon | **12.12 (84)** | 12.11 (83) | Won by 1 point | Melbourne Cricket Ground (H) | 40,179 | 4–1 |
| 6 | Sunday, 7 May (2:10 pm) | Kangaroos | 15.12 (102) | **11.14 (80)** | Lost by 22 points | Telstra Dome (A) | 28,470 | 4–2 |
| 7 | Saturday, 13 May (7:10 pm) | Brisbane Lions | **9.12 (66)** | 16.10 (106) | Lost by 40 points | Carrara Stadium (H) | 12,315 | 4–3 |
| 8 | Friday, 19 May (7:40 pm) | Melbourne | **9.7 (61)** | 20.16 (136) | Lost by 75 points | Melbourne Cricket Ground (H) | 42,985 | 4–4 |
| 9 | Saturday, 27 May (7:10 pm) | Sydney | **7.12 (54)** | 19.5 (119) | Lost by 65 points | Melbourne Cricket Ground (H) | 28,766 | 4–5 |
| 10 | Saturday, 3 June (2:10 pm) | Western Bulldogs | 16.13 (109) | **13.10 (88)** | Lost by 21 points | Telstra Dome (A) | 29,960 | 4–6 |
| 11 | Sunday, 11 June (12:40 pm) | Port Adelaide | 22.13 (145) | **7.7 (49)** | Lost by 96 points | AAMI Stadium (A) | 24,511 | 4–7 |
| 12 | Sunday, 18 June (1:10 pm) | Richmond | **16.9 (105)** | 8.16 (64) | Won by 41 points | Aurora Stadium (H) | 20,971 | 5–7 |
| 13 | Saturday, 1 July (2:10 pm) | St Kilda | 18.17 (125) | **8.7 (55)** | Lost by 70 points | Telstra Dome (A) | 33,869 | 5–8 |
| 14 | Saturday, 8 July (2:10 pm) | West Coast | **16.8 (104)** | 17.12 (114) | Lost by 10 points | Melbourne Cricket Ground (H) | 21,989 | 5–9 |
| 15 | Saturday, 15 July (2:40 pm) | Adelaide | 16.13 (109) | **11.7 (73)** | Lost by 36 points | AAMI Stadium (A) | 37,446 | 5–10 |
| 16 | Saturday, 22 July (7:10 pm) | Brisbane Lions | 11.18 (84) | **11.8 (74)** | Lost by 10 points | The Gabba (A) | 26,738 | 5–11 |
| 17 | Friday, 28 July (7:40 pm) | Collingwood | 16.17 (113) | **11.2 (68)** | Lost by 45 points | Melbourne Cricket Ground (A) | 54,306 | 5–12 |
| 18 | Sunday, 6 August (2:40 pm) | Fremantle | 14.20 (104) | **7.9 (51)** | Lost by 53 points | Subiaco Oval (A) | 35,017 | 5–13 |
| 19 | Sunday, 13 August (2:10 pm) | Carlton | **17.11 (113)** | 13.12 (90) | Won by 23 points | Melbourne Cricket Ground (H) | 36,817 | 6–13 |
| 20 | Saturday, 19 August (7:10 pm) | Essendon | 15.16 (106) | **19.10 (124)** | Won by 18 points | Telstra Dome (A) | 44,275 | 7–13 |
| 21 | Saturday, 26 August (2:10 pm) | Kangaroos | **7.16 (58)** | 4.12 (36) | Won by 22 points | Aurora Stadium (H) | 18,836 | 8–13 |
| 22 | Sunday, 3 September (2:10 pm) | Geelong | **21.7 (133)** | 10.12 (72) | Won by 61 points | Telstra Dome (H) | 28,188 | 9–13 |

== Ladder ==
2006 AFL ladder
| Pos | Team | Pld | W | L | D | PF | PA | PP | Pts | |
|---|---|---|---|---|---|---|---|---|---|---|
| 1 | West Coast (P) | 22 | 17 | 5 | 0 | 2257 | 1874 | 120.4 | 68 | Finals series |
| 2 | Adelaide | 22 | 16 | 6 | 0 | 2331 | 1640 | 142.1 | 64 | Finals series |
| 3 | Fremantle | 22 | 15 | 7 | 0 | 2079 | 1893 | 109.8 | 60 | Finals series |
| 4 | Sydney | 22 | 14 | 8 | 0 | 2098 | 1630 | 128.7 | 56 | Finals series |
| 5 | Collingwood | 22 | 14 | 8 | 0 | 2345 | 1965 | 119.3 | 56 | Finals series |
| 6 | St Kilda | 22 | 14 | 8 | 0 | 2074 | 1752 | 118.4 | 56 | Finals series |
| 7 | Melbourne | 22 | 13 | 8 | 1 | 2146 | 1957 | 109.7 | 54 | Finals series |
| 8 | Western Bulldogs | 22 | 13 | 9 | 0 | 2311 | 2173 | 106.4 | 52 | Finals series |
| 9 | Richmond | 22 | 11 | 11 | 0 | 1934 | 2245 | 86.1 | 44 | |
| 10 | Geelong | 22 | 10 | 11 | 1 | 1982 | 2002 | 99.0 | 42 | |
| 11 | Hawthorn | 22 | 9 | 13 | 0 | 1834 | 2140 | 85.7 | 36 | |
| 12 | Port Adelaide | 22 | 8 | 14 | 0 | 1911 | 2151 | 88.8 | 32 | |
| 13 | Brisbane Lions | 22 | 7 | 15 | 0 | 1844 | 2239 | 82.4 | 28 | |
| 14 | Kangaroos | 22 | 7 | 15 | 0 | 1754 | 2167 | 80.9 | 28 | |
| 15 | Essendon | 22 | 3 | 18 | 1 | 2021 | 2469 | 81.9 | 14 | |
| 16 | Carlton | 22 | 3 | 18 | 1 | 1791 | 2415 | 74.2 | 14 | |

Source: AFL ladder
Rules for classification: 1) points; 2) percentage; 3) number of points for.
(P) Premiers
