= Blake Hardwick =

Australian rules footballer (born 1997)

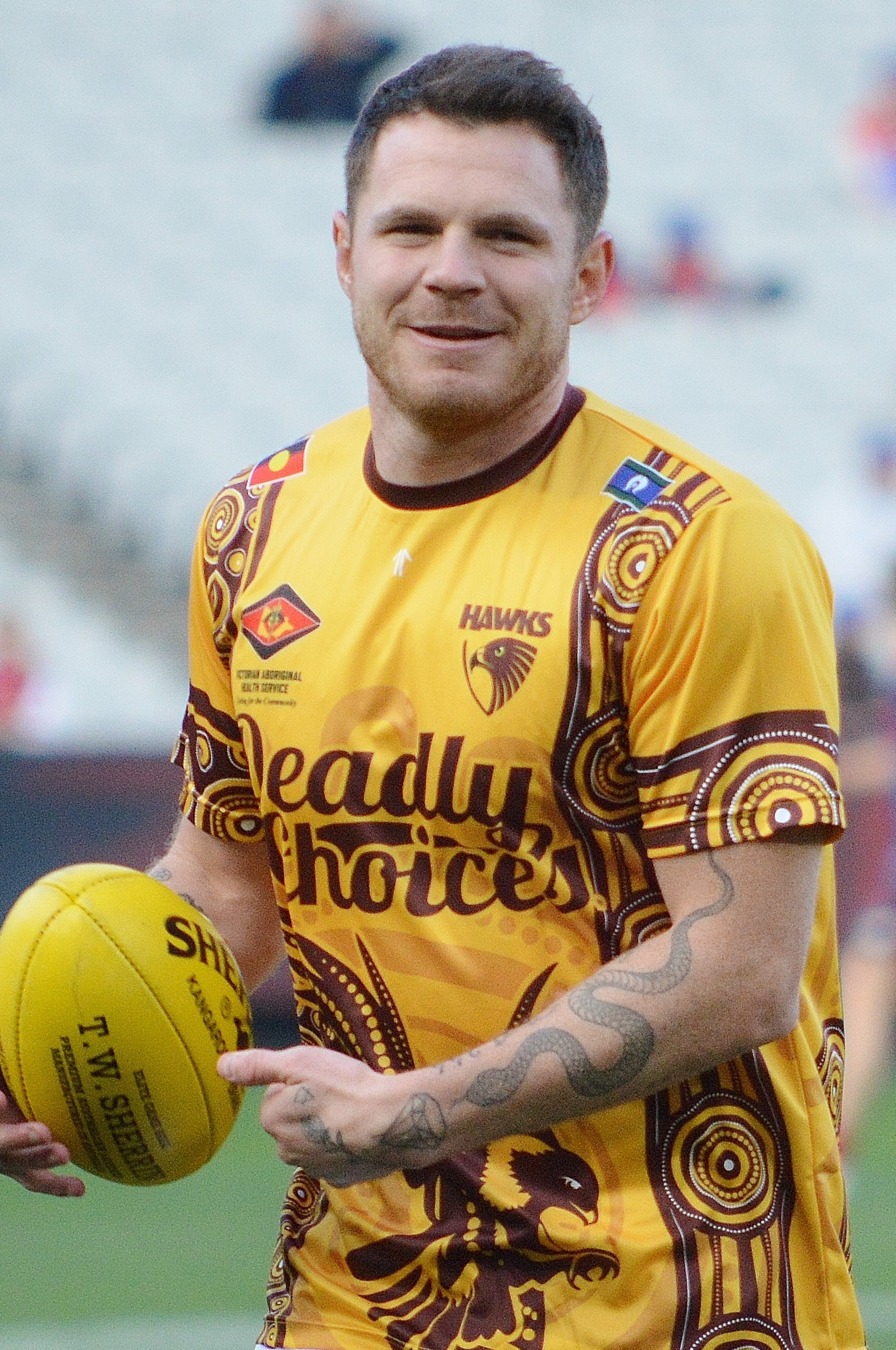
- Hardwick in May 2026

Personal information
- Born: 5 February 1997 (age 29)
- Original team: Eastern Ranges (TAC Cup)
- Draft: No. 44, 2015 national draft
- Debut: Round 19, 2016, Hawthorn vs. Carlton, at Aurora Stadium
- Height: 183 cm (6 ft 0 in)
- Weight: 84 kg (185 lb)
- Position: Defender Forward

Club information
- Current club: Hawthorn
- Number: 15

Playing career^{1}
Years	Club	Games (Goals)
2016–	Hawthorn	223 (41)

Representative team honours^{2}
Years	Team	Games (Goals)
2026–	Victoria	1 (0)
- ^{1} Playing statistics correct to the end of 2026.^{2} Representative statistics correct as of 2026.

Career highlights
- Box Hill leading goalkicker: 2016

Blake Hardwick (born 5 February 1997) is a professional Australian rules footballer playing for the Hawthorn Football Club in the Australian Football League (AFL).

== Early career ==
He grew up in Mitcham attending Mullauna College. Hardwick was the leading point kicker in the 2015 TAC Cup season, kicking 12, 10 and eight goals against the Bendigo Pioneers, Geelong Falcons and Western Jets respectively. He was drafted by the Hawthorn Football Club with their third selection and 44th overall in the 2015 national draft.

== AFL career ==
Hardwick made his debut in a 19-point win against Carlton in round 19, 2016, at Aurora Stadium in Launceston, recording eight disposals and kicking a behind.

He earned a Rising Star nomination in Round 15, 2017, after a string of solid performances, finishing the match with 19 disposals at 94 per cent efficiency, five tackles and three marks in a 24-point win over Collingwood.

On August 14, 2017, Hardwick signed a two-year contract extension keeping him at Hawthorn until the end of 2019.

Entering his third season, Hardwick's guernsey number was changed from 37 to the 15 worn previously by Luke Hodge following the latter's move to Brisbane at the end of the 2017 season.

He played every game of the 2018 season, kicking his first goal at AFL level and finishing second in Hawthorn's best and fairest award, the Peter Crimmins Medal, behind 2018 Brownlow medallist Tom Mitchell.

In 2021, Hardwick played his 100th career game for Hawthorn. He once again finished runner up in the Peter Crimmins medal behind Mitchell.

== Statistics ==
Updated to the end of 2026.

Legend
G	Goals	K	Kicks	D	Disposals	T	Tackles
B	Behinds	H	Handballs	M	Marks

Season	Team	No.	Games	Totals							Averages (per game)							Votes
Season	Team	No.	Games	G	B	K	H	D	M	T	G	B	K	H	D	M	T	Votes
2016	Hawthorn	37	1	0	1	5	3	8	1	3	0.0	1.0	5.0	3.0	8.0	1.0	3.0	0
2017	Hawthorn	37	19	0	1	160	114	274	89	53	0.0	0.1	8.4	6.0	14.4	4.7	2.8	0
2018	Hawthorn	15	24	3	1	219	175	394	107	57	0.1	0.0	9.1	7.3	16.4	4.5	2.4	0
2019	Hawthorn	15	22	2	2	258	124	382	99	69	0.1	0.1	11.7	5.6	17.4	4.5	3.1	0
2020 (Note: The 2020 season was played with 17 home-and-away matches per team (down from 22) and 16-minute quarters with time on (down from 20-minute quarters with time on) due to the impact of the COVID-19 pandemic.)	Hawthorn	15	16	1	0	140	67	207	45	21	0.1	0.0	8.8	4.2	12.9	2.8	1.3	0
2021	Hawthorn	15	20	0	2	312	106	418	108	41	0.0	0.1	15.6	5.3	20.9	5.4	2.1	0
2022	Hawthorn	15	22	0	0	267	99	366	114	42	0.0	0.0	12.1	4.5	16.6	5.2	1.9	0
2023	Hawthorn	15	23	2	1	314	153	467	147	45	0.1	0.0	13.7	6.7	20.3	6.4	2.0	0
2024	Hawthorn	15	25	13	5	250	124	374	118	63	0.5	0.2	10.0	5.0	15.0	4.7	2.5	2
2025	Hawthorn	15	26	11	8	260	123	383	118	61	0.4	0.3	10.0	4.7	14.7	4.5	2.3	1
2026	Hawthorn	15	25	9	4	307	129	436	144	58	0.4	0.2	12.3	5.2	17.4	5.8	2.3	3
Career			223	41	25	2492	1217	3709	1090	513	0.2	0.1	11.2	5.5	16.6	4.9	2.3	6

== Honours and achievements ==
Team

- McClelland Trophy (Hawthorn): 2024

Individual

- Box Hill leading goalkicker: 2016
- AFL Rising Star nominee: 2017
