= Conor Nash =

Australian rules footballer (born 1998)

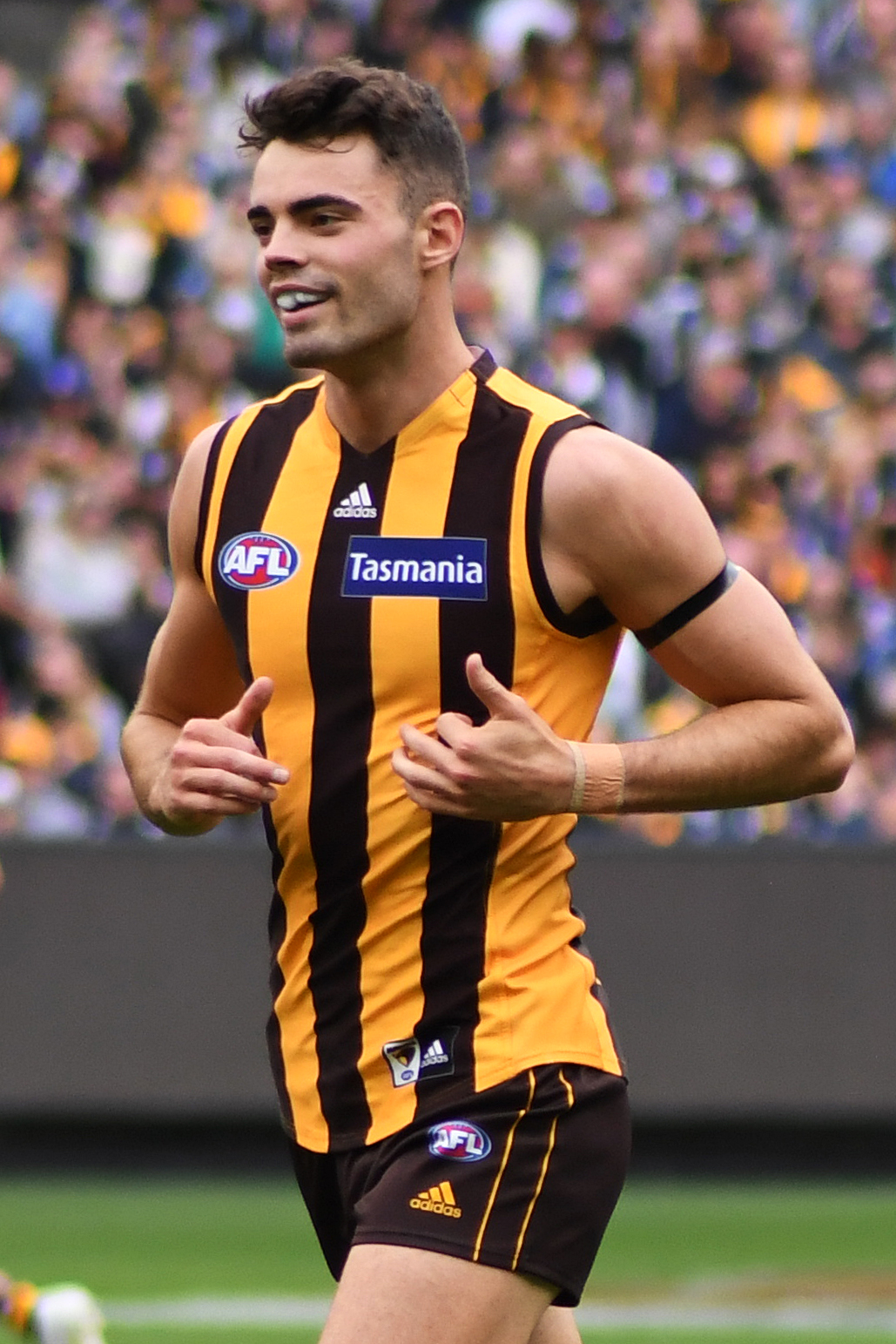
- Nash playing for Hawthorn in 2019

Personal information
- Born: 28 July 1998 (age 28); Fond du Lac, Wisconsin, United States
- Original team: Meath GAA
- Debut: Round 21, 2018, Hawthorn vs. Geelong, at Melbourne Cricket Ground
- Height: 198 cm (6 ft 6 in)
- Weight: 94 kg (207 lb)
- Position: Midfielder

Club information
- Current club: Hawthorn
- Number: 11

Playing career^{1}
Years	Club	Games (Goals)
2017–	Hawthorn	130 (24)
- ^{1} Playing statistics correct to the end of 2026.

Career highlights
- VFL premiership player: 2018

Conor Nash (born 28 July 1998) is an Irish Australian rules footballer who plays for the Hawthorn Football Club in the Australian Football League (AFL). A former Ireland national schoolboy rugby union team player, he was signed by Hawthorn as a Category B rookie in October 2016 in the 2016 rookie draft.

== Early life ==
Nash was born in Fond du Lac, Wisconsin, United States. He was raised in Ireland in Athlumney Village, Navan, the son of Tony and Bernadette, one of three siblings. He attended school at St Patrick's Classical School.

Nash began playing amateur gaelic football for Meath at underage level before joining Simonstown Gaels GAA with which he won the 2016 Meath Senior Football Championship. During that year he also switched to rugby union, playing for Navan R.F.C. and was quickly snapped up by Leinster Rugby to play in its under 18 side. By late 2016 Nash was offered a Leinster rugby union academy contract. However he was also contacted by AFL club Hawthorn who offered a Category B rookie contract. In late 2016 he made the decision to move to Australia for a shot at a professional Aussie Rules career.

On a break from his AFL training he returned to Ireland where he played in the Irish U18 rugby side and also won a second 2017 Meath Senior Football Championship with Simonstown Gaels. Upon returning to Australia, his progress in Aussie Rules was rapid, making his Victorian Football League debut for the Box Hill Football Club in 2017. Nash suffered a severe hamstring injury that cause him to miss half his first season. He was elevated to the main Hawthorn list in July 2018. Nash became well known for running through the streets of Melbourne on a morning jog.

== AFL career ==
He made his debut for Hawthorn in the 11-point win against Geelong at MCG in round 21 of the 2018 season. His form was promising enough that selectors kept him in the side and he played in two finals.

Nash played 14 games in the 2019 season but only two in the shortened season of 2020. He was dropped from the senior side and relegated to the Box Hill affiliate. After initially playing his entire career as a forward, at the suggestion of Box Hill coach Sam Mitchell, Nash was played as a midfielder. He showed promise in this new position and was selected for Hawthorn's match against the Brisbane Lions on 1 August. In a career-defining performance, Nash collected 23 disposals, laid nine tackles and won seven clearances as Hawthorn defeated Brisbane 92-80. With Nash in the midfield, Hawthorn was undefeated for the next four games beating Brisbane, Collingwood and Western Bulldogs and drawing with Richmond.

In 2022, with the illness and then injury to team captain and ruckman Ben McEvoy, Nash was asked to fill in as the second ruckman.

In June 2022, Hawthorn announced that Nash had signed a two-year contract extension lasting until the end of 2024.

On 31 July 2024, Hawthorn announced that Nash had re-signed for another five years, lasting until the end of 2029.

== Statistics ==
Updated to the end of 2026.

Legend
G	Goals	K	Kicks	D	Disposals	T	Tackles
B	Behinds	H	Handballs	M	Marks

Season	Team	No.	Games	Totals							Averages (per game)							Votes
Season	Team	No.	Games	G	B	K	H	D	M	T	G	B	K	H	D	M	T	Votes
2018	Hawthorn	45	5	2	4	21	21	42	12	20	0.4	0.8	4.2	4.2	8.4	2.4	4.0	0
2019	Hawthorn	11	14	9	4	53	71	124	26	38	0.6	0.3	3.8	5.1	8.9	1.9	2.7	0
2020 (Note: The 2020 season was played with 17 home-and-away matches per team (down from 22) and 16-minute quarters with time on (down from 20-minute quarters with time on) due to the impact of the COVID-19 pandemic.)	Hawthorn	11	2	0	1	11	5	16	5	0	0.0	0.5	5.5	2.5	8.0	2.5	0.0	0
2021	Hawthorn	11	8	2	1	51	59	110	26	24	0.3	0.1	6.4	7.4	13.8	3.3	3.0	0
2022	Hawthorn	11	21	2	2	165	161	326	48	86	0.1	0.1	7.9	7.7	15.5	2.3	4.1	0
2023	Hawthorn	11	23	1	5	213	339	552	60	110	0.0	0.2	9.3	14.7	24.0	2.6	4.8	0
2024	Hawthorn	11	25	1	4	211	262	473	62	137	0.0	0.2	8.4	10.5	18.9	2.5	5.5	2
2025	Hawthorn	11	22	5	2	194	210	404	45	124	0.2	0.1	8.8	9.5	18.4	2.0	5.6	0
2026	Hawthorn	11	10	2	2	80	111	191	21	53	0.2	0.2	8.0	11.1	19.1	2.1	5.3	0
Career			130	24	25	999	1239	2238	305	592	0.2	0.2	7.7	9.5	17.2	2.3	4.6	2

== Honours and achievements ==
Team

- McClelland Trophy (Hawthorn): 2024
- VFL premiership player (Box Hill): 2018
