= Ryan Schoenmakers =

Australian rules footballer (born 1990)

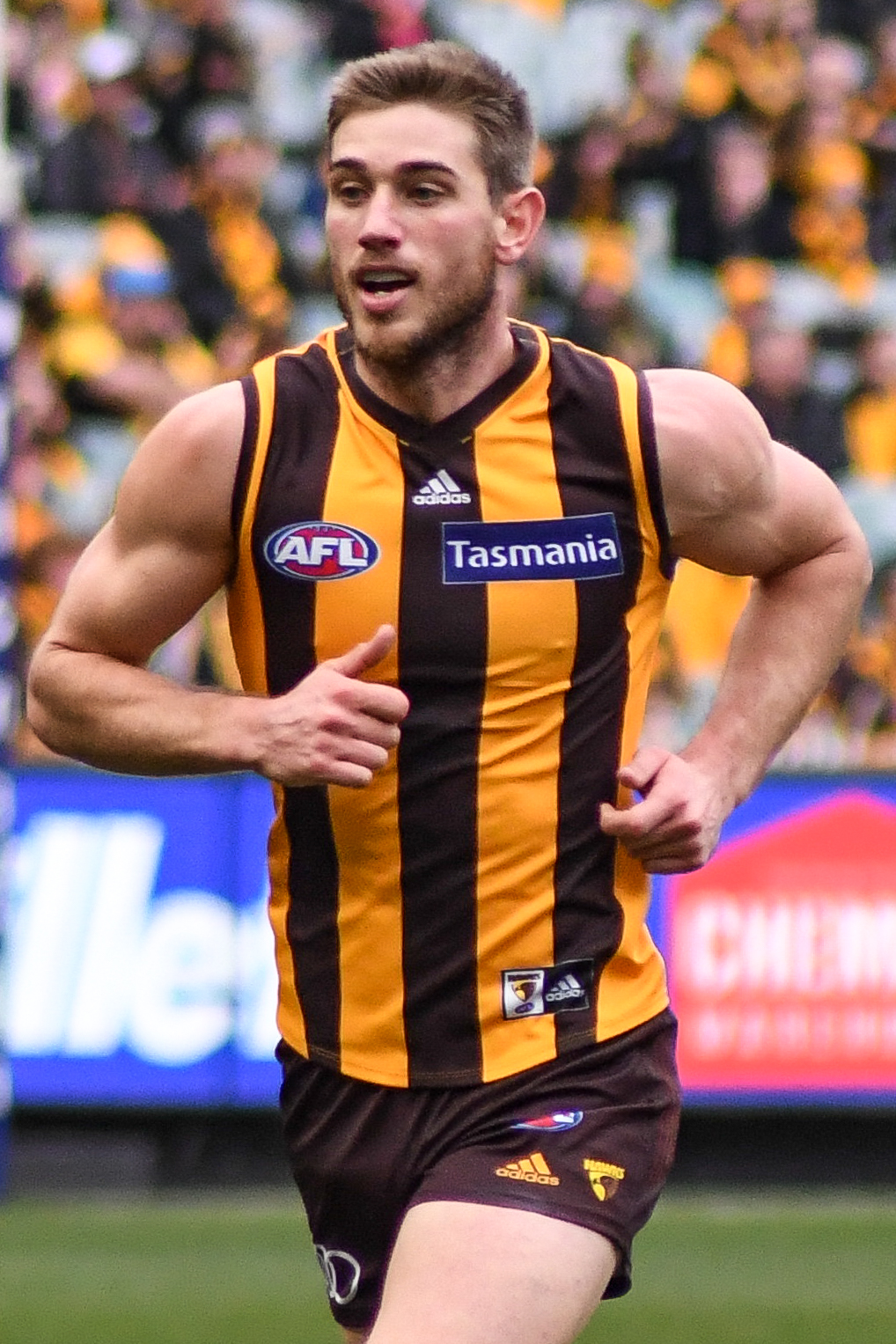
- Schoenmakers playing for Hawthorn in August 2018

Personal information
- Full name: Ryan Schoenmakers
- Nicknames: Drago, Shoey
- Born: 8 November 1990 (age 35)
- Original team: Norwood Redlegs
- Draft: No. 16, 2008 national draft
- Debut: Round 1, 2009, Hawthorn vs. Geelong, at Melbourne Cricket Ground
- Height: 195 cm (6 ft 5 in)
- Weight: 93 kg (205 lb)
- Position: Defender / Forward

Playing career^{1}
Years	Club	Games (Goals)
2009–2019	Hawthorn	121 (51)
- ^{1} Playing statistics correct to the end of 2019.

Career highlights
- AFL premiership player: 2015

Ryan Schoenmakers (born 8 November 1990) is a former professional Australian rules footballer who played for the Hawthorn Football Club in the Australian Football League (AFL). He was selected with the last pick of the first round selections, pick 16, in the 2008 AFL draft.

== Early career ==
Schoenmakers started his career with the Tea Tree Gully Football Club. He moved to Norwood as a junior. Schoenmakers played at centre half forward for the South Australian Under 18 side, as well as for Norwood in the South Australian National Football League (SANFL). He is 195 cm tall and weighs 94 kg.

He was impressive at AFL Draft Camp, with the top ranking in the repeat sprints and in the top six in both the 20m sprint (2.90 sec) and standing vertical jump (69 cm).

Schoenmakers attended St Paul's College, situated in the north eastern suburbs of Adelaide.

== AFL career ==
He made his debut for Hawthorn in the opening round of the 2009 AFL season, in the rematch of the 2008 AFL Grand Final against Geelong.

He was given the nickname "Drago" after his striking resemblance to Dolph Lundgren's character Ivan Drago in the movie Rocky IV.

Schoenmakers ruptured the anterior cruciate ligament (ACL) and strained the medial ligament in his right knee, during the Round 4, 2013 game against Fremantle in Launceston. He underwent a knee reconstruction and missed the 2013 premiership.

Schoenmakers returned to the senior side in round 7 of 2014, with coach Alastair Clarkson choosing to play him in the forward line. Schoenmakers kicked four goals in the first half, before returning to the back line after Brian Lake was subbed out. After that, Schoenmakers was used as a swingman between forward and defence.

In the 2015 AFL season he played both in the forward line and in defence, kicking 15 goals in 16 games. In the finals series of 2015 he was not selected in the first final against West Coast, but was selected for the next two finals. He was selected for the 2015 Grand Final, playing in the Hawks' 46-point victory over the West Coast Eagles.

Schoenmakers missed most of the 2016 season with a groin injury that didn't respond well to treatment. On 28 August 2017, Schoenmakers signed a one-year contract extension to stay at Hawthorn until the end of 2018.

A reoccurring Achilles issue plagued Schoenmakers over the later part of his career. On 18 October 2019, Schoenmakers announced his retirement from the AFL.

== Statistics ==
Legend
G	Goals	K	Kicks	D	Disposals	T	Tackles
B	Behinds	H	Handballs	M	Marks

Season	Team	No.	Games	Totals							Averages (per game)							Votes
Season	Team	No.	Games	G	B	K	H	D	M	T	G	B	K	H	D	M	T	Votes
2009	Hawthorn	25	13	1	0	64	64	128	33	38	0.1	0.0	4.9	4.9	9.9	2.5	2.9	0
2010	Hawthorn	25	11	0	2	79	43	122	45	30	0.0	0.2	7.2	3.9	11.1	4.1	2.7	0
2011	Hawthorn	25	11	0	0	104	47	151	59	31	0.0	0.0	9.5	4.3	13.7	5.4	2.8	0
2012	Hawthorn	25	25	4	2	211	139	350	120	43	0.2	0.1	8.4	5.6	14.0	4.8	2.0	0
2013	Hawthorn	25	4	0	0	27	26	53	16	6	0.0	0.0	6.8	6.5	13.3	4.0	1.5	0
2014	Hawthorn	25	15	8	4	141	69	210	70	30	0.5	0.3	9.4	4.6	14.0	4.7	2.0	0
2015^{#}	Hawthorn	25	16	15	5	124	76	200	69	41	0.9	0.3	7.8	4.8	12.5	4.3	2.6	0
2016	Hawthorn	25	6	3	3	30	20	50	14	6	0.5	0.5	5.0	3.3	8.3	2.3	1.0	0
2017	Hawthorn	25	11	11	8	79	45	124	49	14	1.0	0.7	7.2	4.1	11.3	4.5	1.3	0
2018	Hawthorn	25	9	9	7	51	31	82	28	16	1.0	0.8	5.7	3.4	9.1	3.1	1.8	0
2019	Hawthorn	25	0	—	—	—	—	—	—	—	—	—	—	—	—	—	—	0
Career			121	51	31	910	560	1470	503	255	0.4	0.3	7.5	4.6	12.1	4.2	2.1	0

== Honours and achievements ==
Team

- AFL premiership player (Hawthorn): 2015
- 2× Minor premiership (Hawthorn): 2012, 2013
- Minor premiership (Box Hill): 2015

Individual

- Hawthorn life member
