= 2017 Hawthorn Football Club season =

93rd season in the Australian Football League

Hawthorn Football Club
2017 season
- President: Richard Garvey
- Coach: Alastair Clarkson
- Captain: Jarryd Roughead
- Home grounds: Melbourne Cricket Ground; University of Tasmania Stadium
- AFL season: 10–11–1 (12th)
- Finals series: Did not qualify
- Best and Fairest: Tom Mitchell
- Leading goalkicker: Jarryd Roughead (38)
- Highest home attendance: 62,360 (Round 4 vs. Geelong)
- Lowest home attendance: 10,553 (Round 8 vs. Brisbane Lions)
- Average home attendance: 33,257

The 2017 season was the Hawthorn Football Club's 93rd season in the Australian Football League and 116th overall, the 18th season playing home games at the Melbourne Cricket Ground, the 17th season playing home games at the newly named University of Tasmania Stadium, the 13th season under head coach Alastair Clarkson, and the 1st season with Jarryd Roughead as club captain. This was the first time since 2013 that Hawthorn didn't enter the season as the defending premiers.

Hawthorn started the season 0–4 for the first time since 1998. Hawthorn failed to match their 17–5 record from 2016, finishing in 12th with a 10–11–1 record. With Hawthorn's 7 point loss to Carlton in round 22, they were eliminated from finals contention for this first time since 2009. This was also the first time since 2005, Hawthorn were defeated by Carlton. This was also the first time under Clarkson that no player kicked 50 goals for the season.

== Club summary ==
The 2017 AFL season is the 121st season of the VFL/AFL competition since its inception in 1897; having entered the competition in 1925, it was the 93rd season contested by the Hawthorn Football Club. Tasmania and iiNet continued as the club's two major sponsors, as they had done since 2006 and 2013 respectively, while Adidas continued to manufacture the club's on-and-off field apparel, as they had done since 2013. Hawthorn continued its alignment with the Box Hill Hawks Football Club in the Victorian Football League, allowing Hawthorn-listed players to play with the Box Hill Hawks when not selected in AFL matches.

== Senior personnel ==
Alastair Clarkson continued as the club's head coach for the thirteenth consecutive season. In a surprise announcement, Jarryd Roughead replaced Luke Hodge as the club's captain on 20 January 2017 after the latter had led the club since 2011.

It was announced in December 2016 that Stuart Fox would leave his position as the club's Chief Executive Officer to take up the same position with the Melbourne Cricket Club at the end of February 2017. On 1 May, Tracey Gaudry was appointed the club's new CEO.

== Playing list changes ==
The following lists all player changes between the conclusion of the 2016 season and the beginning of the 2017 season.

=== Trades ===
| 13 October 2016 | To Hawthorn Pick 23, 2016 AFL draft | To Fremantle Bradley Hill |
| 14 October 2016 | To Hawthorn Pick 52, 2016 AFL draft Pick 70, 2016 AFL draft Pick 88, 2016 AFL draft | To West Coast Sam Mitchell; Pick 54, 2016 AFL draft Pick 72, 2016 AFL draft |
| 14 October 2016 | To Hawthorn Tom Mitchell; Pick 57, 2016 AFL draft | To Sydney Pick 14, 2016 AFL draft Pick 52, 2016 AFL draft |
| 14 October 2016 | To Hawthorn Pick 10, 2016 AFL draft Pick 68, 2016 AFL draft | To St Kilda Pick 23, 2016 AFL draft Pick 36, 2016 AFL draft 1st round pick, 2017 AFL draft |
| 18 October 2016 | To Hawthorn Pick 48, 2016 AFL draft Pick 66, 2016 AFL draft | To Melbourne Jordan Lewis; Pick 57, 2016 AFL draft Pick 68, 2016 AFL draft |
| 20 October 2016 | To Hawthorn 2nd round pick, 2017 AFL draft (via Greater Western Sydney) | To Carlton Pick 48, 2016 AFL draft Pick 66, 2016 AFL draft Pick 70, 2016 AFL draft |
| 20 October 2016 | To Hawthorn Jaeger O'Meara | To Gold Coast Pick 10, 2016 AFL draft 2nd round pick, 2017 AFL draft |

=== Free agency ===
==== Additions ====
| Date | Player | Type | 2016 team | Deal | Compensation | Ref |
|---|---|---|---|---|---|---|
| 9 October 2016 | Ty Vickery | RFA | Richmond | Signed 2-year deal | 2nd round pick, 2016 AFL draft | |
| 30 October 2016 | Conor Nash | N/A | Meath GAA | N/A | N/A | |
| 8 November 2016 | Ricky Henderson | DFA | Adelaide | N/A | None | |

=== Draft ===
==== AFL draft ====
| Round | Overall pick | Player | Recruited from | ref |
|---|---|---|---|---|
| 5 | 74 | Harry Morrison | Murray Bushrangers | |
| 5 | 76 | Mitchell Lewis | Calder Cannons | |

==== Rookie draft ====
| Round | Overall pick | Player | Recruited from | ref |
|---|---|---|---|---|
| 1 | 14 | Oliver Hanrahan | St Kevin's College | |
| 2 | 31 | Jack Fitzpatrick (Note: Fitzpatrick was originally delisted by Hawthorn on 28 October 2016 but was re-drafted as a rookie) | Hawthorn | |
| 3 | 46 | James Cousins | Murray Bushrangers | |

=== Retirements and delistings ===
| Date | Player | 2017 team | Reason | Ref |
|---|---|---|---|---|
| 15 March 2016 | Shem-Kalvin Tatupu | —N/a | Retired | |
| 28 October 2016 | Matt Spangher | —N/a | Delisted | |
| 28 October 2016 | Angus Litherland | —N/a | Delisted | |
| 28 October 2016 | Zac Webster | —N/a | Delisted | |
| 28 October 2016 | Lachlan Langford | —N/a | Delisted | |
| 28 October 2016 | Alex Woodward | —N/a | Delisted | |
| 28 October 2016 | Jermaine Miller-Lewis | —N/a | Delisted | |

== 2017 player squad ==
2017 Hawthorn Football Club squad
| Senior list | | Rookie list | Coaching staff |
|---|---|---|---|
| 2 Jarryd Roughead (C); 3 Tom Mitchell; 4 Billy Hartung; 5 Ryan Burton; 6 Josh Gibson; 7 Ben McEvoy; 8 Taylor Duryea; 9 Shaun Burgoyne; 10 Jaeger O'Meara; 11 Brendan Whitecross; 12 James Frawley; 13 Jonathan O'Rourke; 14 Grant Birchall; 15 Luke Hodge; 16 Isaac Smith (VC); 17 Daniel Howe; 18 Jonathon Ceglar; 19 Jack Gunston; 20 Dallas Willsmore; 21 James Sicily | 22 Luke Breust; 23 Tim O'Brien; 24 Ben Stratton; 25 Ryan Schoenmakers; 26 Liam Shiels (VC); 27 Ty Vickery; 28 Paul Puopolo; 29 Will Langford; 30 Kaiden Brand; 31 Ricky Henderson; 33 Cyril Rioli; 34 Kurt Heatherley; 35 Harry Morrison; 36 Kieran Lovell; 37 Blake Hardwick; 39 Mitchell Lewis; 40 Kade Stewart; 42 Teia Miles; 43 Marc Pittonet | 32 Jack Fitzpatrick (ret); 41 Oliver Hanrahan; 44 Conor Glass (B); 45 Conor Nash (B); 46 James Cousins | Head coach: Alastair Clarkson; Assistant coaches: Brett Ratten (stoppages coach); Cameron Bruce (midfield coach); Adem Yze (backline coach); Damian Monkhorst (ruck coach); Damian Carroll (forward coach); David Neitz (key position coach); Max Bailey (development coach); Legend: (c) Captain(s); (vc) Vice-captain(s); Long-term injury list; Upgraded rookie(s); (B) Category B rookie; (ret) Retired; Updated: 21 August 2017; Source(s): HFC Website; Coaches |

== Season summary ==
=== Pre-season matches ===
The club played three practice matches as part of the 2017 JLT Community Series, and will be played under modified pre-season rules, including nine-point goals.

| Rd | Date and local time | Opponent | Scores (Hawthorn's scores indicated in bold) | | | Venue | Report |
| Rd | Date and local time | Opponent | Home | Away | Result | Venue | Report |
|---|---|---|---|---|---|---|---|
| 1 | Friday, 17 February (7:40 pm) | Geelong | **0.15.8 (98)** | 1.13.7 (94) | Won by 4 points | University of Tasmania Stadium (H) | Report |
| 2 | Sunday, 26 February (2:05 pm) | North Melbourne | 0.14.11 (95) | **0.11.8 (74)** | Lost by 21 points | Arden Street (A) | Report |
| 3 | Sunday, 12 March (12:40 pm) | Port Adelaide | 0.14.12 (96) | **1.8.11 (68)** | Lost by 28 points | Hickinbotham Oval (A) | Report |

=== Premiership season ===
==== Fixture summary ====
The full fixture was announced on 27 October 2016. The Melbourne Cricket Ground once again acted as Hawthorn's primary home ground, hosting six of the club's eleven home games, with four home games played at their secondary home ground, University of Tasmania Stadium, in Launceston, and one home game played at Etihad Stadium against the Western Bulldogs in round 23. The club's opponents for the four games in Launceston were St Kilda, Brisbane Lions, Greater Western Sydney and North Melbourne in rounds six, eight, 16 and 21 respectively, while the club played Adelaide, Collingwood, Geelong, Gold Coast and Sydney twice during the regular season.

The Hawks began the 2017 season with a 25-point loss to Essendon, which welcomed six of its banned players back from a season-long suspension which had spanned the entire 2016 season, at the Melbourne Cricket Ground in round one; due to the weighted rule, it was the only time the clubs met during the regular season. The club's first home game came the following round, when it hosted 2016 finalists Adelaide at the Melbourne Cricket Ground in round two. It travelled to Adelaide twice for matches against Port Adelaide and Adelaide (for a second time) in rounds 11 and 14 respectively, while it also travelled to the Gold Coast, Sydney and Perth once each, in rounds three, ten and eighteen respectively. Additionally, it played three Friday night matches (two against Sydney and one against the Western Bulldogs) and two Thursday night matches (both at the Adelaide Oval) during the regular season, while ten of the club's 21 matches were broadcast on free-to-air.

Based on its finishing position from 2016, Hawthorn's fixture was rated the second-most difficult (only behind Greater Western Sydney) by The Age; it was the fifth consecutive season in which it has been dealt either the most or second-most difficult fixture of any club.

==== Fixture ====
| Rd | Date and local time | Opponent | Scores (Hawthorn's scores indicated in bold) | | | Venue | Record | Report |
| Rd | Date and local time | Opponent | Home | Away | Result | Venue | Record | Report |
|---|---|---|---|---|---|---|---|---|
| 1 | Saturday, 25 March (7:25 pm) | Essendon | 17.14 (116) | **12.19 (91)** | Lost by 25 points | Melbourne Cricket Ground (A) | 0–1 | Report |
| 2 | Saturday, April 1 (1:45 pm) | Adelaide | **13.11 (89)** | 16.17 (113) | Lost by 24 points | Melbourne Cricket Ground (H) | 0–2 | Report |
| 3 | Sunday, April 9 (4:40 pm) | Gold Coast | 21.13 (139) | **7.11 (53)** | Lost by 86 points | Metricon Stadium (A) | 0–3 | Report |
| 4 | Monday, April 17 (3:20 pm) | Geelong | **6.12 (48)** | 20.14 (134) | Lost by 86 points | Melbourne Cricket Ground (H) | 0–4 | Report |
| 5 | Sunday, 23 April (4:40 pm) | West Coast | **19.11 (125)** | 11.8 (74) | Won by 51 points | Melbourne Cricket Ground (H) | 1–4 | Report |
| 6 | Saturday, April 29 (1:45 pm) | St Kilda | **8.7 (55)** | 19.16 (130) | Lost by 75 points | University of Tasmania Stadium (H) | 1–5 | Report |
| 7 | Sunday, 7 May (3:20 pm) | Melbourne | 14.7 (91) | **14.10 (94)** | Won by 3 points | Melbourne Cricket Ground (A) | 2–5 | Report |
| 8 | Saturday, 13 May (1:45 pm) | Brisbane Lions | **17.11 (113)** | 11.9 (75) | Won by 38 points | University of Tasmania Stadium (H) | 3–5 | Report |
| 9 | Saturday, 20 May (7:25 pm) | Collingwood | 13.12 (90) | **11.6 (72)** | Lost by 18 points | Melbourne Cricket Ground (A) | 3–6 | Report |
| 10 | Friday, 26 May (7:50 pm) | Sydney | 11.9 (75) | **12.9 (81)** | Won by 6 points | Sydney Cricket Ground (A) | 4–6 | Report |
| 11 | Thursday, 1 June (7:20 pm) | Port Adelaide | 13.20 (98) | **7.5 (47)** | Lost by 51 points | Adelaide Oval (A) | 4–7 | Report |
| 12 | Saturday, 10 June (1:45 pm) | Gold Coast | **12.7 (79)** | 13.17 (95) | Lost by 16 points | Melbourne Cricket Ground (H) | 4–8 | Report |
| 13 | Bye | | | | | | | |
| 14 | Thursday, 22 June (7:20 pm) | Adelaide | 12.10 (82) | **14.12 (96)** | Won by 14 points | Adelaide Oval (A) | 5–8 | Report |
| 15 | Sunday, 2 July (3:20 pm) | Collingwood | **18.10 (118)** | 14.10 (94) | Won by 24 points | Melbourne Cricket Ground (H) | 6–8 | Report |
| 16 | Saturday, 8 July (1:45 pm) | Greater Western Sydney | **14.13 (97)** | 15.7 (97) | Draw | University of Tasmania Stadium (H) | 6–8–1 | Report |
| 17 | Saturday, 15 July (1:45 pm) | Geelong | 13.10 (88) | **12.13 (85)** | Lost by 3 points | Melbourne Cricket Ground (A) | 6–9–1 | Report |
| 18 | Saturday, 22 July (5:40 pm) | Fremantle | 7.6 (48) | **15.10 (100)** | Won by 52 points | Domain Stadium (A) | 7–9–1 | Report |
| 19 | Friday, 28 July (7:50 pm) | Sydney | **10.12 (72)** | 9.12 (66) | Won by 6 points | Melbourne Cricket Ground (H) | 8–9–1 | Report |
| 20 | Sunday, 6 August (3:20 pm) | Richmond | 13.15 (93) | **9.10 (64)** | Lost by 29 points | Melbourne Cricket Ground (A) | 8–10–1 | Report |
| 21 | Sunday, 13 August (3:20 pm) | North Melbourne | **18.8 (116)** | 14.5 (89) | Won by 27 points | University of Tasmania Stadium (H) | 9–10–1 | Report |
| 22 | Saturday, 19 August (7:25 pm) | Carlton | 12.5 (77) | **10.10 (70)** | Lost by 7 points | Etihad Stadium (A) | 9–11–1 | Report |
| 23 | Friday, 25 August (7:50 pm) | Western Bulldogs | **15.9 (99)** | 13.12 (90) | Won by 9 points | Etihad Stadium (H) | 10–11–1 | Report |

=== Ladder ===
| Pos | Team | Pld | W | L | D | PF | PA | PP | Pts | Qualification |
|---|---|---|---|---|---|---|---|---|---|---|
| 1 | Adelaide | 22 | 15 | 6 | 1 | 2415 | 1776 | 136.0 | 62 | 2017 finals |
| 2 | Geelong | 22 | 15 | 6 | 1 | 2134 | 1818 | 117.4 | 62 | 2017 finals |
| 3 | Richmond (P) | 22 | 15 | 7 | 0 | 1992 | 1684 | 118.3 | 60 | 2017 finals |
| 4 | Greater Western Sydney | 22 | 14 | 6 | 2 | 2081 | 1812 | 114.8 | 60 | 2017 finals |
| 5 | Port Adelaide | 22 | 14 | 8 | 0 | 2168 | 1671 | 129.7 | 56 | 2017 finals |
| 6 | Sydney | 22 | 14 | 8 | 0 | 2093 | 1651 | 126.8 | 56 | 2017 finals |
| 7 | Essendon | 22 | 12 | 10 | 0 | 2135 | 2004 | 106.5 | 48 | 2017 finals |
| 8 | West Coast | 22 | 12 | 10 | 0 | 1964 | 1858 | 105.7 | 48 | 2017 finals |
| 9 | Melbourne | 22 | 12 | 10 | 0 | 2035 | 1934 | 105.2 | 48 | |
| 10 | Western Bulldogs | 22 | 11 | 11 | 0 | 1857 | 1913 | 97.1 | 44 | |
| 11 | St Kilda | 22 | 11 | 11 | 0 | 1925 | 1986 | 96.9 | 44 | |
| **12** | Hawthorn | **22** | **10** | **11** | **1** | **1864** | **2055** | **90.7** | 42 | |
| 13 | Collingwood | 22 | 9 | 12 | 1 | 1944 | 1963 | 99.0 | 38 | |
| 14 | Fremantle | 22 | 8 | 14 | 0 | 1607 | 2160 | 74.4 | 32 | |
| 15 | North Melbourne | 22 | 6 | 16 | 0 | 1983 | 2264 | 87.6 | 24 | |
| 16 | Carlton | 22 | 6 | 16 | 0 | 1594 | 2038 | 78.2 | 24 | |
| 17 | Gold Coast | 22 | 6 | 16 | 0 | 1756 | 2311 | 76.0 | 24 | |
| 18 | Brisbane Lions | 22 | 5 | 17 | 0 | 1877 | 2526 | 74.3 | 20 | |

Source: AFL
Rules for classification: 1) points; 2) percentage; 3) number of points for.
(P) Premiers

== Awards, records and milestones ==
=== Awards ===
- Peter Crimmins Medal: Tom Mitchell
- All-Australian team: Tom Mitchell
- 22 Under 22 team: Ryan Burton, James Sicily

=== Records ===
- Round 7:
  - Alastair Clarkson won his 182nd game as coach, which is the most of any Hawthorn coach.
  - Ben McEvoy had 53 hitouts, which is the most recorded by a Hawthorn player
- Round 9:
  - Tom Mitchell had 50 disposals, which is the most recorded by a Hawthorn player.
- Round 18:
  - Alastair Clarkson coached his 300th game, which is the most of any Hawthorn coach.

=== Milestones ===
- Round 1:
  - Ricky Henderson – Hawthorn debut
  - Tom Mitchell – Hawthorn debut
  - Jaeger O'Meara – Hawthorn debut
  - Ty Vickery – Hawthorn debut
- Round 2:
  - Teia Miles – AFL debut
  - Josh Gibson – 150th game for Hawthorn
  - Tom Mitchell – 1st goal for Hawthorn
  - Ty Vickery – 1st goal for Hawthorn
- Round 3:
  - Jaeger O'Meara – 1st goal for Hawthorn
- Round 4:
  - Ben McEvoy – 150th AFL game
  - Will Langford – 50th AFL game
- Round 5:
  - Jarryd Roughead – 500th AFL goal
  - Liam Shiels – 50th AFL goal
- Round 7:
  - Billy Hartung – 50th AFL game
- Round 8:
  - Liam Shiels – 150th AFL game
  - Ricky Henderson – 1st goal for Hawthorn
- Round 10:
  - Luke Breust – 150th AFL game
  - Brendan Whitecross – 100th AFL game
  - James Cousins – AFL debut
  - Dallas Willsmore – AFL debut
  - James Cousins – 1st AFL goal
- Round 14:
  - Ricky Henderson – 100th AFL game
- Round 15:
  - Ricky Henderson – 50th AFL goal
- Round 16:
  - Isaac Smith – 150th AFL game
- Round 17:
  - Luke Hodge – 300th AFL game
- Round 18:
  - Alastair Clarkson – 300th AFL game as coach
  - Conor Glass – AFL debut
- Round 19:
  - Shaun Burgoyne – 100th goal for Hawthorn
- Round 20:
  - Jarryd Roughead – 250th AFL game
  - Teia Miles – 1st AFL goal
- Round 21:
  - Luke Breust – 300th AFL goal
- Round 22:
  - Taylor Duryea – 100th AFL game
- Round 23:
  - Jaeger O'Meara – 50th AFL game

== Brownlow Medal ==
=== Results ===
| Round | 1 vote | 2 votes | 3 votes |
|---|---|---|---|
| 1 | Zach Merrett (Essendon) | Orazio Fantasia (Essendon) | Dyson Heppell (Essendon) |
| 2 | Tom Lynch (Adelaide) | Sam Jacobs (Adelaide) | Rory Sloane (Adelaide) |
| 3 | Brandon Matera (Gold Coast) | Aaron Hall (Gold Coast) | Gary Ablett Jr. (Gold Coast) |
| 4 | Zach Tuohy (Geelong) | Mitch Duncan (Geelong) | Steven Motlop (Geelong) |
| 5 | Liam Shiels (Hawthorn) | Tom Mitchell (Hawthorn) | Ben McEvoy (Hawthorn) |
| 6 | Nick Riewoldt (St Kilda) | Sebastian Ross (St Kilda) | Jack Steven (St Kilda) |
| 7 | Tom Mitchell (Hawthorn) | Ben McEvoy (Hawthorn) | Jack Viney (Melbourne) |
| 8 | Ryan Burton (Hawthorn) | Stefan Martin (Brisbane Lions) | Tom Mitchell (Hawthorn) |
| 9 | Taylor Adams (Collingwood) | Scott Pendlebury (Collingwood) | Tom Mitchell (Hawthorn) |
| 10 | Dan Hannebery (Sydney) | Lance Franklin (Sydney) | Shaun Burgoyne (Hawthorn) |
| 11 | Ollie Wines (Port Adelaide) | Charlie Dixon (Port Adelaide) | Brad Ebert (Port Adelaide) |
| 12 | Jack Gunston (Hawthorn) | Steven May (Gold Coast) | Gary Ablett Jr. (Gold Coast) |
| 13 | Bye | | |
| 14 | Tom Mitchell (Hawthorn) | Shaun Burgoyne (Hawthorn) | Ricky Henderson (Hawthorn) |
| 15 | Ryan Burton (Hawthorn) | Jordan De Goey (Collingwood) | Tom Mitchell (Hawthorn) |
| 16 | Jonathon Patton (Greater Western Sydney) | Josh Kelly (Greater Western Sydney) | Tom Mitchell (Hawthorn) |
| 17 | Liam Shiels (Hawthorn) | Tom Mitchell (Hawthorn) | Patrick Dangerfield (Geelong) |
| 18 | Liam Shiels (Hawthorn) | Jack Gunston (Hawthorn) | Tom Mitchell (Hawthorn) |
| 19 | Luke Parker (Sydney) | Liam Shiels (Hawthorn) | Jarryd Roughead (Hawthorn) |
| 20 | James Sicily (Hawthorn) | Dion Prestia (Richmond) | Josh Caddy (Richmond) |
| 21 | Tom Mitchell (Hawthorn) | Isaac Smith (Hawthorn) | Jack Gunston (Hawthorn) |
| 22 | Sam Docherty (Carlton) | Marc Murphy (Carlton) | Tom Mitchell (Hawthorn) |
| 23 | Jaeger O'Meara (Hawthorn) | Jack Macrae (Western Bulldogs) | Jarryd Roughead (Hawthorn) |

=== Brownlow Medal tally ===
| Player | 1 vote games | 2 vote games | 3 vote games | Total votes |
|---|---|---|---|---|
| Tom Mitchell | 3 | 2 | 6 | 25 |
| Jack Gunston | 1 | 1 | 1 | 6 |
| Jarryd Roughead | 0 | 0 | 2 | 6 |
| Shaun Burgoyne | 0 | 1 | 1 | 5 |
| Ben McEvoy | 0 | 1 | 1 | 5 |
| Liam Shiels | 3 | 1 | 0 | 5 |
| Ricky Henderson | 0 | 0 | 1 | 3 |
| Ryan Burton | 2 | 0 | 0 | 2 |
| Isaac Smith | 0 | 1 | 0 | 2 |
| Jaeger O'Meara | 1 | 0 | 0 | 1 |
| James Sicily | 1 | 0 | 0 | 1 |
| Total | 11 | 7 | 12 | 61 |

== Tribunal cases ==
| Player | Round | Charge category | Verdict | Result | Victim | Club | Ref(s) |
|---|---|---|---|---|---|---|---|
| Ben Stratton | 2 | Striking | Guilty | Fine | Eddie Betts | Adelaide | |
| Josh Gibson | 4 | Rough conduct | Not Guilty | Cleared | Tom Ruggles | Geelong | |
| Cyril Rioli | 5 | Striking | Guilty | Fine | Brad Sheppard | West Coast | |
| Isaac Smith | 8 | Striking | Guilty | Fine | Nick Robertson | Brisbane Lions | |
| Shaun Burgoyne | 10 | Rough conduct | Not Guilty | Cleared | Sam Reid | Sydney | |
| Luke Hodge | 11 | Rough conduct | Guilty | Fine | Aaron Young | Port Adelaide | |
| Brendan Whitecross | 12 | Striking | Guilty | Fine | Gary Ablett Jr. | Gold Coast | |
| Luke Hodge | 16 | Rough conduct | Guilty | Fine | Jeremy Cameron | Greater Western Sydney | |
| Luke Hodge | 19 | Striking | Guilty | 1 week | Tom Papley | Sydney | |
| James Sicily | 22 | Striking | Guilty | Fine | Jed Lamb | Carlton | |
| Blake Hardwick | 23 | Rough conduct | Not Guilty | Cleared | Marcus Bontempelli | Western Bulldogs | |
