= 2013 Hawthorn Football Club season =

89th season in the Australian Football League

Hawthorn Football Club
2013 season
- President: Andrew Newbold
- Coach: Alastair Clarkson
- Captain: Luke Hodge
- Home ground: Melbourne Cricket Ground; Aurora Stadium
- Pre-season competition: 18th
- AFL season: 19–3 (1st)
- Finals Series: Premiers (Defeated Fremantle 77–62)
- Best and Fairest: Josh Gibson
- Leading goalkicker: Jarryd Roughead (72)
- Highest home attendance: 100,007 (Grand Final vs. Fremantle)
- Lowest home attendance: 10,513 (Round 8 vs. Greater Western Sydney
- Average home attendance: 47,700

The 2013 season was the Hawthorn Football Club's 89th season in the Australian Football League and 112th overall.

== Overview ==
After losing the 2012 AFL Grand Final against the Sydney Swans, Hawthorn participated in the 2012 AFL draft and traded Tom Murphy and Clinton Young to the Gold Coast and Collingwood respectively via the free agency system. The club also picked up Jonathan Simpkin from Geelong. During the main trade period, the Hawks picked up former Western Bulldogs backman Brian Lake and Sydney Swans forward Matthew Spangher and offloaded Stephen Gilham to Greater Western Sydney.

== Playing list changes ==
The following lists all player changes between the conclusion of the 2012 season and the beginning of the 2013 season.

=== Trades ===
| 7 October 2012 | To Hawthorn Brian Lake; Pick 27, 2012 AFL draft | To Western Bulldogs Pick 21, 2012 AFL draft Pick 43, 2012 AFL draft |
| 25 October 2012 | To Hawthorn Matt Spangher; Pick 70, 2012 AFL draft | To Sydney Pick 64, 2012 AFL draft |
| 26 October 2012 | To Hawthorn Jed Anderson; Pick 28, 2012 AFL draft Pick 66, 2012 AFL draft | To Greater Western Sydney Stephen Gilham; Pick 27, 2012 AFL draft Pick 63, 2012 AFL draft |

=== Free Agency ===
==== Additions ====
| Date | Player | Type | 2012 team | Deal | Compensation | Ref |
|---|---|---|---|---|---|---|
| 1 November 2012 | Jonathan Simpkin | DFA | Geelong | N/A | None | |

==== Departures ====
| Date | Player | Type | 2013 team | Deal | Compensation | Ref |
|---|---|---|---|---|---|---|
| 12 October 2012 | Thomas Murphy | UFA | Gold Coast | Signed 2-year deal | None | |
| 19 October 2012 | Clinton Young | UFA | Collingwood | Signed 3-year deal | 3rd round pick, 2012 AFL draft | |

=== Draft ===
==== AFL draft ====
| Round | Overall pick | Player | Recruited from | ref |
|---|---|---|---|---|
| 2 | 28 | Tim O'Brien | Glenelg | |
| 4 | 66 | Kaiden Brand | West Adelaide | |
| 4 | 70 | Michael Osborne (Note: Osborne was originally delisted by Hawthorn on 30 October 2012 but was re-drafted) | Hawthorn | |

==== Rookie draft ====
| Round | Overall pick | Player | Recruited from | ref |
|---|---|---|---|---|
| 1 | 15 | Jonathon Ceglar | Collingwood | |
| 2 | 28 | Ciarán Kilkenny | Dublin GAA | |

=== Retirements and delistings ===
| Date | Player | New Club | Reason | Ref |
|---|---|---|---|---|
| 16 July 2012 | Cameron Bruce | —N/a | Retired | |
| 14 September 2012 | Chance Bateman | —N/a | Retired | |
| 12 October 2012 | Jarrad Boumann | —N/a | Delisted | |
| 30 October 2012 | Thomas Schneider | —N/a | Delisted | |
| 30 October 2012 | Adam Pattison | —N/a | Delisted | |
| 30 October 2012 | Broc McCauley | —N/a | Retired | |

== 2013 player squad ==
2013 Hawthorn Football Club squad
| Senior list | | Rookie list | Coaching staff |
|---|---|---|---|
| 2 Jarryd Roughead (VC); 3 Jordan Lewis (VC); 4 Matt Suckling; 5 Sam Mitchell (vet); 6 Josh Gibson; 7 Michael Osborne (vet); 8 Xavier Ellis; 9 Shaun Burgoyne; 10 Bradley Hill; 11 Brendan Whitecross; 12 Brad Sewell (vet); 13 Kyle Cheney; 14 Grant Birchall; 15 Luke Hodge (C) (vet); 16 Isaac Smith; 17 Brian Lake; 18 Brent Guerra; 19 Jack Gunston; 20 David Hale; 21 Shane Savage | 22 Luke Breust; 23 Lance Franklin; 24 Ben Stratton; 25 Ryan Schoenmakers; 26 Liam Shiels; 27 Matt Spangher; 28 Paul Puopolo; 30 Luke Lowden; 31 Angus Litherland; 32 Jonathan Simpkin; 33 Cyril Rioli; 34 Jordan Kelly; 35 Samuel Grimley; 36 Alex Woodward; 37 Jed Anderson; 38 Mitch Hallahan; 39 Max Bailey; 40 Tim O'Brien; 41 Taylor Duryea; 42 Kaiden Brand | 29 Will Langford; 43 Amos Frank; 44 Andrew Boseley; 46 Derick Wanganeen; 47 Jonathon Ceglar; Draft Rookie: 45 Kurt Heatherley | Head coach: Alastair Clarkson; Assistant coaches: Leon Cameron (Forward); Adam Yze (Forward); Brendon Bolton (Midfield); Adam Simpson (Midfield); Luke Beveridge (Defence); Damian Monkhorst (Ruck); Legend: (c) Captain(s); (vc) Vice-captain(s); Long-term injury list; Upgraded rookie(s); (vet) Veteran's list; (ret) Retired; Updated: 28 September 2013; Source(s): HFC Website; Coaches |

== Fixture ==
=== NAB Cup ===
| Rd | Date and local time | Opponent | Scores (Hawthorn's scores indicated in bold) | | | Venue | Attendance |
| Rd | Date and local time | Opponent | Home | Away | Result | Venue | Attendance |
|---|---|---|---|---|---|---|---|
| 1 | Saturday, 23 February (6:40 pm) | Gold Coast | 0.4.6 (30) | **0.4.5 (29)** | Lost by 1 point | Metricon Stadium | 7,847 |
| 1 | Saturday, 23 February (7:45 pm) | Brisbane Lions | 0.4.8 (32) | **0.1.5 (11)** | Lost by 21 points | Metricon Stadium | – |
| 2 | Friday, 1 March (7:40 pm) | Western Bulldogs | 1.10.6 (75) | **2.8.8 (74)** | Lost by 1 point | Etihad Stadium (A) | 8,162 |
| 3 | Saturday, 9 March (1:10 pm) | Richmond | **0.13.6 (84)** | 0.13.7 (85) | Lost by 1 point | Aurora Stadium (H) | 8,601 |

=== Premiership season ===
| Rd | Date and local time | Opponent | Scores (Hawthorn's scores indicated in bold) | | | Venue | Attendance | Record | Report |
| Rd | Date and local time | Opponent | Home | Away | Result | Venue | Attendance | Record | Report |
|---|---|---|---|---|---|---|---|---|---|
| 1 | Monday, 1 April (3:20 pm) | Geelong | **12.14 (86)** | 13.15 (93) | Lost by 7 points | Melbourne Cricket Ground (H) | 76,300 | 0–1 | Report |
| 2 | Sunday, 7 April (2:20 pm) | West Coast | 15.8 (98) | **23.10 (148)** | Won by 50 points | Patersons Stadium (A) | 38,389 | 1–1 | Report |
| 3 | Sunday, 14 April (3:20 pm) | Collingwood | 13.12 (90) | **22.13 (145)** | Won by 55 points | Melbourne Cricket Ground (A) | 72,254 | 2–1 | Report |
| 4 | Saturday, 20 April (1:45 pm) | Fremantle | **18.10 (118)** | 11.10 (76) | Won by 42 points | Aurora Stadium (H) | 12,619 | 3–1 | Report |
| 5 | Sunday, 28 April (4:40 pm) | North Melbourne | **14.15 (99)** | 13.18 (96) | Won by 3 points | Melbourne Cricket Ground (H) | 42,103 | 4–1 | Report |
| 6 | Saturday, 4 May (4:10 pm) | Adelaide | 11.12 (78) | **13.11 (89)** | Won by 11 points | AAMI Stadium (A) | 37,324 | 5–1 | Report |
| 7 | Saturday, 11 May (7:40 pm) | Sydney | **18.11 (119)** | 12.10 (82) | Won by 37 points | Melbourne Cricket Ground (H) | 54,725 | 6–1 | Report |
| 8 | Saturday, 18 May (2:10 pm) | Greater Western Sydney | **21.14 (140)** | 9.3 (57) | Won by 83 points | Aurora Stadium (H) | 10,513 | 7–1 | Report |
| 9 | Sunday, 26 May (1:10 pm) | Gold Coast | **18.10 (118)** | 14.8 (92) | Won by 26 points | Melbourne Cricket Ground (H) | 28,112 | 8–1 | Report |
| 10 | Sunday, 2 June (3:20 pm) | Melbourne | 6.12 (48) | **21.17 (143)** | Won by 95 points | Melbourne Cricket Ground (A) | 28,546 | 9–1 | Report |
| 11 | Bye | | | | | | | | |
| 12 | Friday, 14 June (7:50 pm) | Carlton | 13.9 (87) | **15.12 (102)** | Won by 15 points | Etihad Stadium (A) | 45,670 | 10–1 | Report |
| 13 | Friday, 21 June (7:50 pm) | West Coast | **19.9 (123)** | 16.7 (103) | Won by 20 points | Etihad Stadium (H) | 32,567 | 11–1 | Report |
| 14 | Sunday, 30 June (1:10 pm) | Brisbane Lions | **21.17 (143)** | 12.13 (85) | Won by 58 points | Aurora Stadium (H) | 15,796 | 12–1 | Report |
| 15 | Saturday, 6 July (7:40 pm) | Geelong | 11.16 (82) | **10.12 (72)** | Lost by 10 points | Melbourne Cricket Ground (A) | 85,197 | 12–2 | Report |
| 16 | Saturday, 13 July (1:15 pm) | Port Adelaide | 12.7 (79) | **19.10 (124)** | Won by 45 points | AAMI Stadium (A) | 23,748 | 13–2 | Report |
| 17 | Saturday, 20 July (1:45 pm) | Western Bulldogs | **13.17 (95)** | 11.10 (76) | Won by 19 points | Aurora Stadium (H) | 14,022 | 14–2 | Report |
| 18 | Friday, 26 July (7:50 pm) | Essendon | 13.9 (87) | **22.11 (143)** | Won by 56 points | Etihad Stadium (A) | 49,505 | 15–2 | Report |
| 19 | Saturday, 3 August (2:10 pm) | Richmond | **9.12 (66)** | 16.11 (107) | Lost by 41 points | Melbourne Cricket Ground (H) | 64,324 | 15–3 | Report |
| 20 | Friday, 9 August (7:50 pm) | St Kilda | 7.14 (56) | **14.18 (102)** | Won by 46 points | Etihad Stadium (A) | 24,765 | 16–3 | Report |
| 21 | Friday, 16 August (7:50 pm) | Collingwood | **18.11 (119)** | 12.12 (84) | Won by 35 points | Melbourne Cricket Ground (H) | 71,533 | 17–3 | Report |
| 22 | Saturday, 24 August (2:10 pm) | North Melbourne | 15.13 (103) | **17.15 (117)** | Won by 14 points | Etihad Stadium (A) | 33,039 | 18–3 | Report |
| 23 | Friday, 30 August (7:50 pm) | Sydney | 16.4 (100) | **17.10 (112)** | Won by 12 points | ANZ Stadium (A) | 37,980 | 19–3 | Report |

=== Ladder ===
2013 AFL ladder
| Pos | Team | Pld | W | L | D | PF | PA | PP | Pts | |
|---|---|---|---|---|---|---|---|---|---|---|
| **1** | Hawthorn (P) | **22** | **19** | **3** | **0** | **2523** | **1859** | **135.7** | 76 | Finals series |
| 2 | Geelong | 22 | 18 | 4 | 0 | 2409 | 1776 | 135.6 | 72 | Finals series |
| 3 | Fremantle | 22 | 16 | 5 | 1 | 2035 | 1518 | 134.1 | 66 | Finals series |
| 4 | Sydney | 22 | 15 | 6 | 1 | 2244 | 1694 | 132.5 | 62 | Finals series |
| 5 | Richmond | 22 | 15 | 7 | 0 | 2154 | 1754 | 122.8 | 60 | Finals series |
| 6 | Collingwood | 22 | 14 | 8 | 0 | 2148 | 1868 | 115.0 | 56 | Finals series |
| 7 | Port Adelaide | 22 | 12 | 10 | 0 | 2051 | 2002 | 102.4 | 48 | Finals series |
| 8 | Carlton | 22 | 11 | 11 | 0 | 2125 | 1992 | 106.7 | 44 | Finals series |
| 9 | Essendon | 22 | 14 | 8 | 0 | 2145 | 2000 | 107.3 | 56 (Note: Essendon was relegated to ninth due to irregularities in its supplements program during the 2012 season.) | |
| 10 | North Melbourne | 22 | 10 | 12 | 0 | 2307 | 1930 | 119.5 | 40 | |
| 11 | Adelaide | 22 | 10 | 12 | 0 | 2064 | 1909 | 108.1 | 40 | |
| 12 | Brisbane Lions | 22 | 10 | 12 | 0 | 1922 | 2144 | 89.6 | 40 | |
| 13 | West Coast | 22 | 9 | 13 | 0 | 2038 | 2139 | 95.3 | 36 | |
| 14 | Gold Coast | 22 | 8 | 14 | 0 | 1918 | 2091 | 91.7 | 32 | |
| 15 | Western Bulldogs | 22 | 8 | 14 | 0 | 1926 | 2262 | 85.1 | 32 | |
| 16 | St Kilda | 22 | 5 | 17 | 0 | 1751 | 2120 | 82.6 | 20 | |
| 17 | Melbourne | 22 | 2 | 20 | 0 | 1455 | 2691 | 54.1 | 8 | |
| 18 | Greater Western Sydney | 22 | 1 | 21 | 0 | 1524 | 2990 | 51.0 | 4 | |

Source: AFL Tables
Rules for classification: 1) points; 2) percentage; 3) number of points for.
(P) Premiers

=== Finals series ===
| Rd | Date and local time | Opponent | Scores (Hawthorn's scores indicated in bold) | | | Venue | Attendance | Report |
| Rd | Date and local time | Opponent | Home | Away | Result | Venue | Attendance | Report |
|---|---|---|---|---|---|---|---|---|
| Qualifying final | Friday, 6 September (7:50 pm) | Sydney | **15.15 (105)** | 7.9 (51) | Won by 54 points | Melbourne Cricket Ground (H) | 59,615 | Report |
| Semi-final | Advanced to Preliminary final | | | | | | | |
| Preliminary final | Friday, 20 September (7:50 pm) | Geelong | **14.18 (102)** | 15.7 (97) | Won by 5 points | Melbourne Cricket Ground (H) | 85,569 | Report |
| Grand Final | Saturday, 28 September (2:30 pm) | Fremantle | **11.11 (77)** | 8.14 (62) | Won by 15 points | Melbourne Cricket Ground (H) | 100,007 | Report |

== Awards, Records & Milestones ==
=== Awards ===
- Round 3 - Jed Anderson - 2013 AFL Rising Star nomination
- Round 6 - Brad Hill - 2013 AFL Rising Star nomination
- Round 23 - Jarryd Roughead - Coleman Medallist
- All Australian Selection - Sam Mitchell, Jarryd Roughead
- Coleman Medal - Jarryd Roughead
- Norm Smith Medal - Brian Lake

=== Records ===
- 300th goal - Jarryd Roughead
- 150th goal - Luke Hodge
- 150th goal - Cyril Rioli
- 100th goal - Jordan Lewis
- 100th goal - Luke Breust
- 100th goal - Jack Gunston
- 50th goal - Isaac Smith

Hawthorn win 12 games in a row from round 2 to 14. Equal 1961 as club's longest winning run.

=== Milestones ===
- Round 1 - Jed Anderson ( AFL debut)
- Round 3 - Taylor Duryea (AFL debut)
- Round 5 - Brian Lake (Debut at Hawthorn)
- Round 6 - Jonathan Simpkin (Debut at Hawthorn)
- Round 6 - David Hale (50th AFL game for Hawthorn)
- Round 7 - Brian Lake (200th AFL game)
- Round 8 - Matthew Spangher (Debut at Hawthorn)
- Round 9 - Sam Grimley (AFL debut)
- Round 9 - Luke Breust (50th AFL game)
- Round 9 - Paul Puopolo (50th AFL game)
- Round 13 - Brent Guerra (150th AFL game for Hawthorn)
- Round 14 - John Ceglar (AFL debut)
- Round 14 - Isaac Smith (50th AFL game)
- Round 17 - Will Langford (AFL debut)
- Round 17 - Shane Savage (50th AFL game)
- Round 19 - Brent Guerra (250th AFL game)
- Round 20 - Jack Gunston (50th AFL game)
- Qual Final - First time ever, Hawthorn's all-time 'points for' tally was greater than their all-time 'points against' tally.
