= 2014 AFL Grand Final =

Grand final of the 2014 Australian Football League season

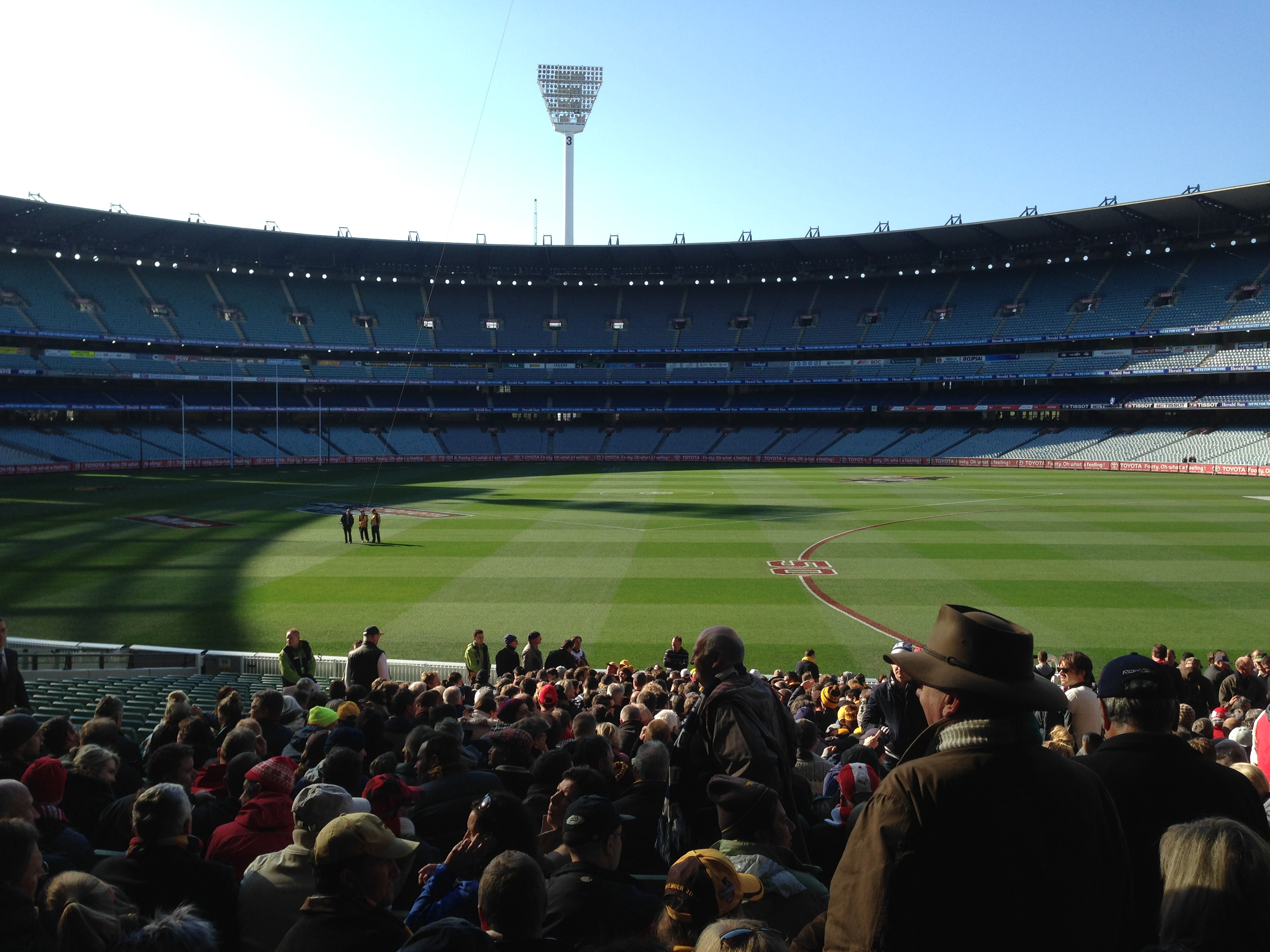
- View of the Melbourne Cricket Ground, shortly after gates opened for the 2014 AFL Grand Final.

Sydney	Hawthorn
11.8 (74)	21.11 (137)
	1	2	3	4
SYD	2.3 (15)	5.3 (33)	8.5 (53)	11.8 (74)
HAW	5.5 (35)	11.9 (75)	16.11 (107)	21.11 (137)
- Date: 27 September 2014, 2.30pm
- Stadium: Melbourne Cricket Ground
- Attendance: 99,454
- Favourite: Sydney
- Umpires: Simon Meredith, Mathew Nicholls, Matt Stevic
- Coin toss won by: Hawthorn
- Kicked toward: City End

Ceremonies
- Pre-match entertainment: Tom Jones, Ed Sheeran, Mike Brady
- National anthem: Olivia Newton-John
- Post-match entertainment: Tom Jones, Ed Sheeran

Accolades
- Norm Smith Medallist: Luke Hodge (Hawthorn)
- Jock McHale Medallist: Alastair Clarkson (Hawthorn)

Broadcast in Australia
- Network: Seven Network
- Commentators: Bruce McAvaney (host); Dennis Cometti (commentator); Wayne Carey (expert commentator); Tom Harley (expert commentator); Leigh Matthews (expert commentator); Matthew Richardson (boundary rider); Tim Watson (boundary rider); Cameron Ling (analyst)

The 2014 AFL Grand Final was an Australian rules football game contested between the Sydney Swans and the Hawthorn Football Club at the Melbourne Cricket Ground on 27 September 2014. It was the 119th annual grand final of the Australian Football League (formerly the Victorian Football League), staged to determine the premiers for the 2014 AFL season. The match, attended by 99,460 spectators, was won by Hawthorn by a margin of 63 points, marking the club's second consecutive premiership and twelfth VFL/AFL premiership victory overall. Hawthorn's Luke Hodge was awarded the Norm Smith Medal as the best player on the ground.

== Background ==
Having finished the home and away season as minor premiers, Sydney advanced to the Grand Final with a hard-fought victory over Fremantle, followed by a 71-point victory over North Melbourne in their preliminary final. Defending premiers Hawthorn, which finished second behind Sydney on the ladder, advanced after defeating Geelong by 36 points in their qualifying final, followed by a three-point victory over Port Adelaide in the second preliminary final.

The two teams met twice during the home-and-away season, with Sydney winning by 19 points at ANZ Stadium in Round 8 and Hawthorn winning by 10 points at the MCG in Round 18.

It was the second time that Sydney and Hawthorn had met in a grand final, having faced each other two years earlier in the 2012 AFL Grand Final when Sydney won by 10 points. The match was Hawthorn's third grand final appearance in a row, having also appeared in the 2013 AFL Grand Final when it defeated Fremantle by 15 points.

== Pre-match entertainment ==
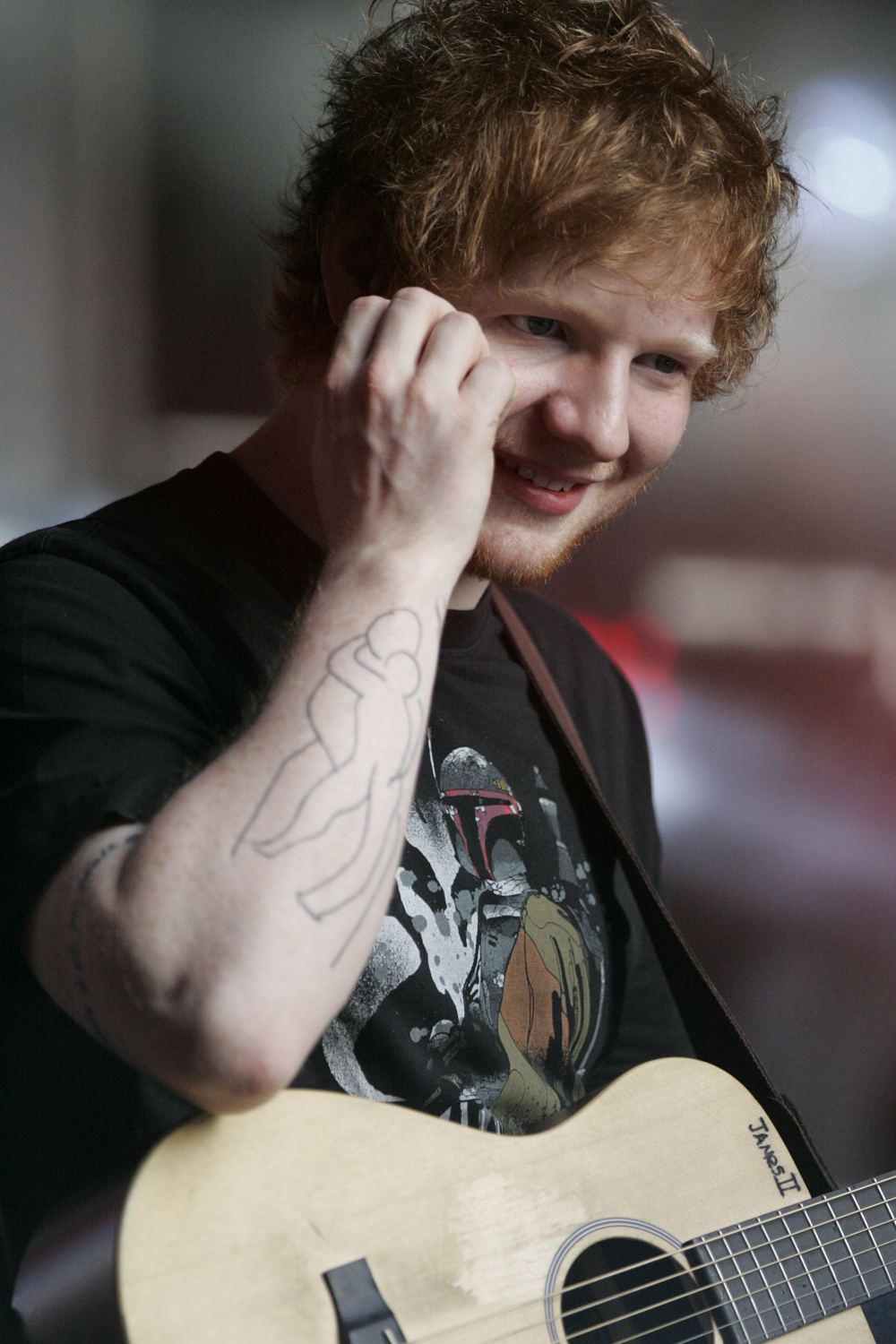
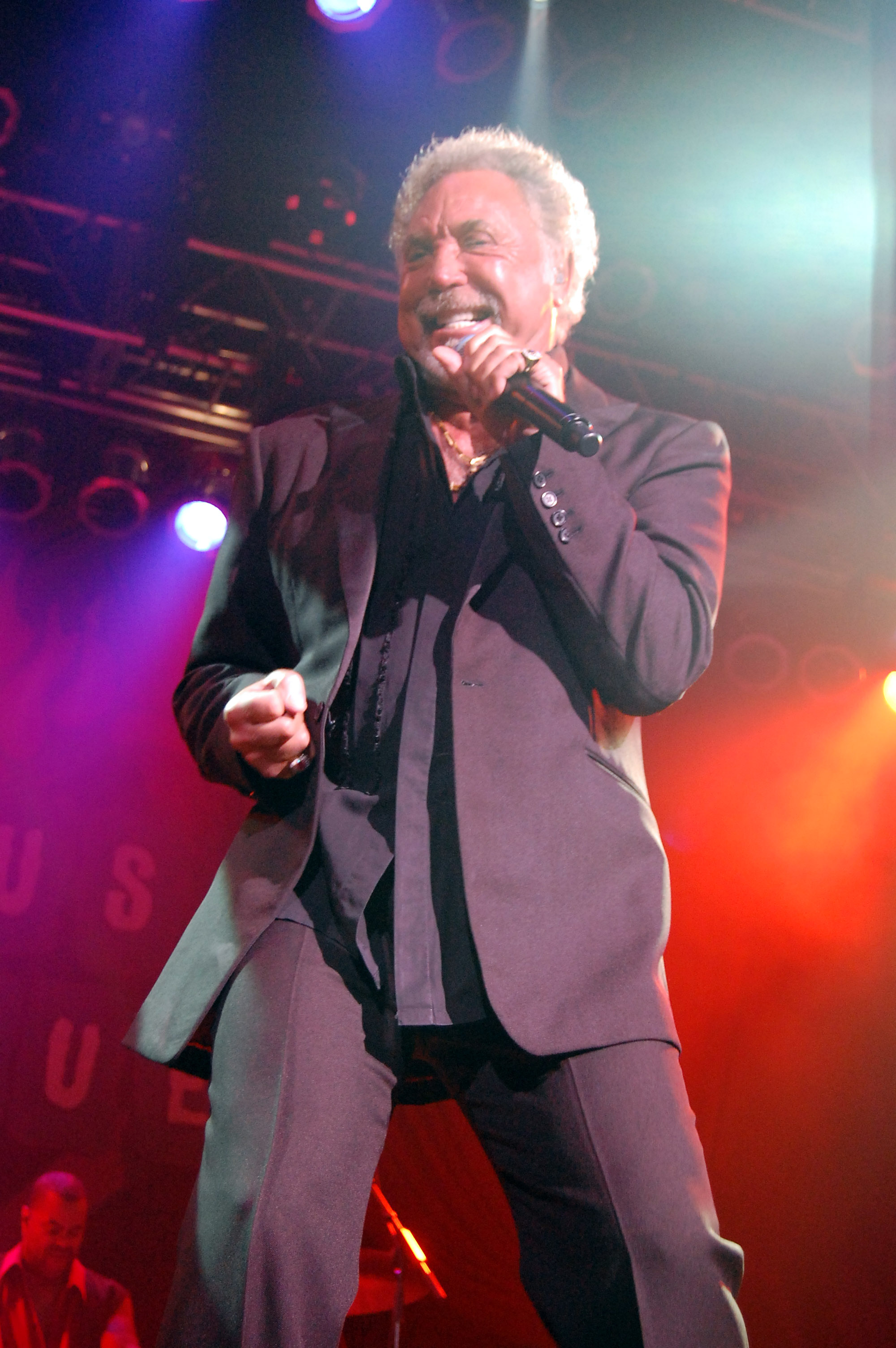
Ed Sheeran (left) and Sir Tom Jones (right) performed at the Grand Final as part of the revamped Pre-match entertainment.

Welsh singer Sir Tom Jones and English singer-songwriter Ed Sheeran both performed as pre-match entertainment at the 2014 AFL Grand Final. The two were the first international acts to perform at a grand final since American singer Meat Loaf's infamous performance at the 2011 AFL Grand Final. Both Sheeran and Jones were the first acts to be offered the sets by the AFL, with both acts accepting without hesitation. Jones said about the offer to perform at the game: "I understand there will be over 100,000 people in the stadium for the grand final which makes this spectacular sporting event something I'm really looking forward to. I also know that Australian football has really passionate fans so it'll be great to be a part of the atmosphere and excitement on the day." Sheeran said that the decision to play was not a hard decision to make, saying that "Having spent some time in Australia recently I know just how popular the game is and how big an event this will be."

Sheeran performed "Sing" and "The A Team" and was then joined by Jones to sing "Kiss", followed by "Mama Told Me Not to Come", "Delilah" and "If I Only Knew". Mike Brady performed "Up There Cazaly", a grand final tradition. Olivia Newton-John performed the Australian National Anthem, "Advance Australia Fair".

A post-match entertainment show featuring Sheeran and Jones was also held. There was no half-time musical entertainment. The traditional Grand Final sprint held at half-time was won by Jordan Murdoch of Geelong, breaking Patrick Dangerfield's streak of three consecutive victories from 2011 to 2013.

== Match summary ==
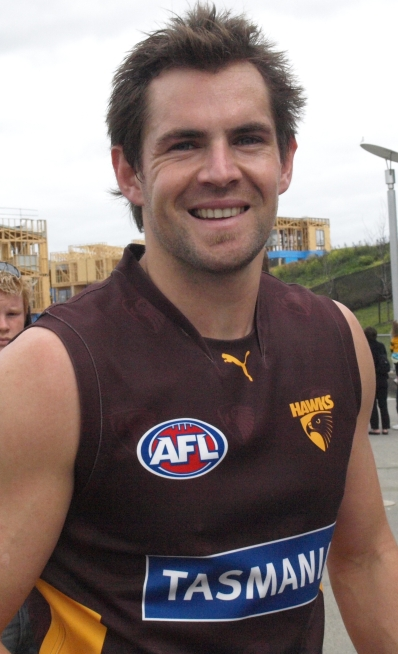
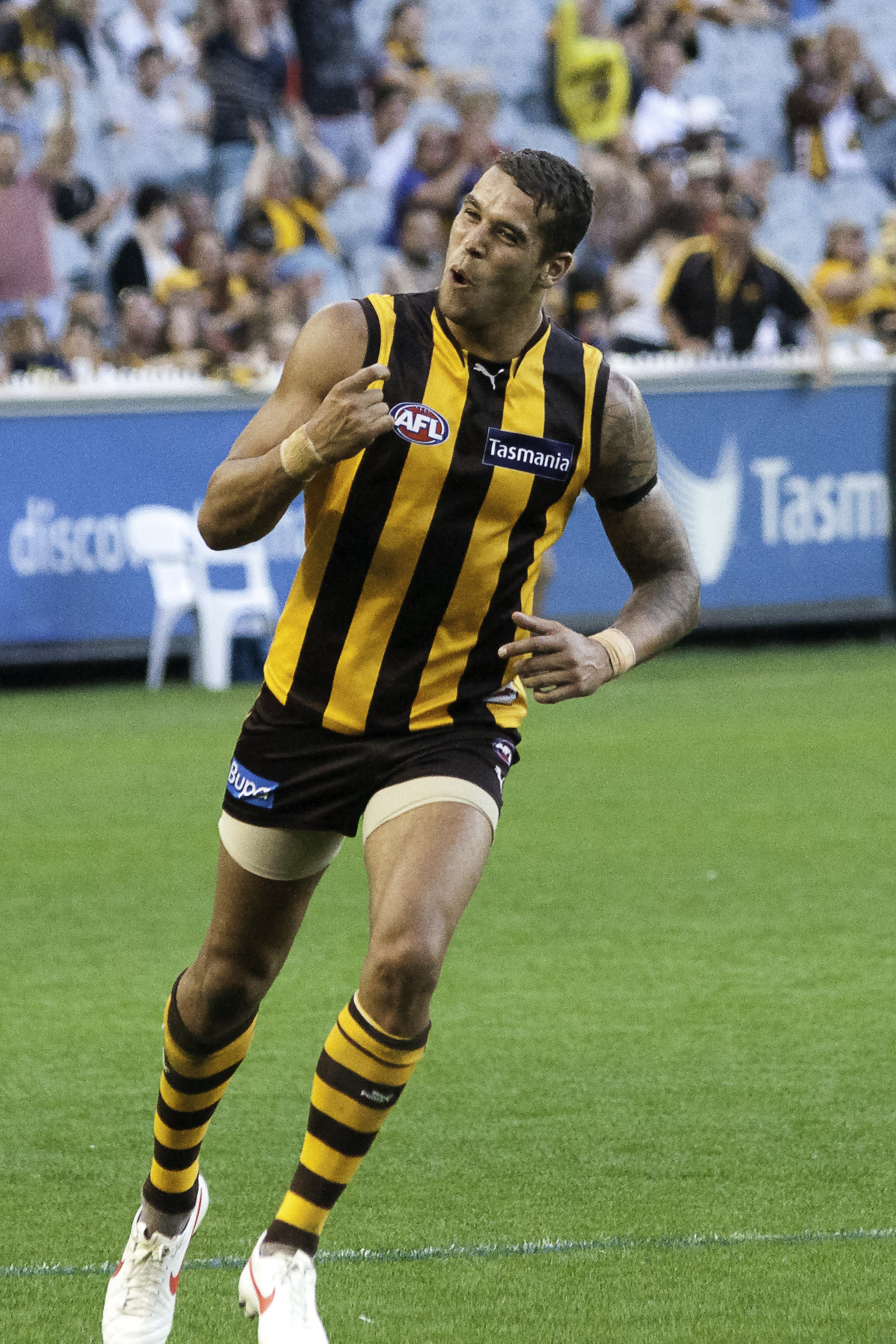
The 2014 AFL Grand Final was the 250th game for Hawthorn captain Luke Hodge (left), and saw Sydney's Lance Franklin (right) face his former club, having been a 2013 premiership player for Hawthorn.

=== First quarter ===
The first quarter began with the teams going goal for goal in the first 15 mins. Josh Kennedy kicked the first goal for Sydney with a long bomb, before Paul Puopolo kicked a long-range shot for Hawthorn. Lance Franklin kicked the next goal for Sydney, and Luke Breust replied to make the score two goals apiece. From that moment onwards, Hawthorn controlled the quarter, with Brad Hill, Jack Gunston and Will Langford each kicking a goal in the second half of the quarter. At quarter time, Hawthorn 5.5 (35) led Sydney 2.3 (15) by 20 points.

=== Second quarter ===
In the second quarter, Ben McGlynn goaled within the first minute for Sydney. Thereafter, Hawthorn took control of the game and in a ten-minute purple patch kicked five goals to surge to a 47-point lead. Goals came from: Breust in the 7th minute; David Hale in the 10th minute; Langford in the 11th minute after storming through the centre and bombing from 50m; and two goals to Luke Hodge in the 13th and 16th minutes, including one from a simple intercept of a misdirected Gary Rohan kick-in. Adam Goodes and Franklin responded with two successive goals for Sydney, before an intercept by Cyril Rioli resulted in a late goal to Jarryd Roughead. Having kicked six goals to three in the quarter, Hawthorn 11.9 (75) led Sydney 5.3 (33) by 42 points.

=== Third quarter ===
Hawthorn was the first to score in the third quarter, as Roughead and Gunston each added goals. Kieren Jack and Franklin responded with two goals, before Hawthorn kicked the next three goals: Matt Suckling; Roughead; and a goal dribbled through from the boundary line by Langford. Kurt Tippett kicked a late goal for Sydney, and at three-quarter time Hawthorn 16.11 (107) led Sydney 8.5 (53) by 54 points.

=== Final quarter ===
With the result beyond doubt, Hawthorn kicked a further five goals to Sydney's three in the final quarter. Goals were added by Breust, Roughead (2) and Shaun Burgoyne (2) for Hawthorn, and by Goodes, Franklin and Jack for Sydney. In the end, Hawthorn 21.11 (137) defeated Sydney 11.8 (74) by 63 points.

=== Overall report ===
Hawthorn dominated the match from start to finish, applying pressure on the Swans that was at times was brutal. Hawthorn led most of the key statistical indicators, including disposals 442–298, tackles 63–57 and inside-50s 64–44. Clearances were almost even, Hawthorn leading 38–36. Jarryd Roughead was the top scorer for Hawthorn kicking 5.1 and Lance Franklin was the top goal kicker for Sydney, kicking 4.2.

=== Norm Smith Medal ===
Norm Smith Medal voting tally
Position	Player	Club	Total votes	Voting summary
1st (winner)	Luke Hodge	Hawthorn	10	3,3,2,2
2nd – tied	Jordan Lewis	Hawthorn	9	3,3,2,1
2nd – tied	Sam Mitchell	Hawthorn	9	3,2,2,1,1
4th – tied	Josh Gibson	Hawthorn	1	1
4th – tied	Will Langford	Hawthorn	1	1

Hawthorn defender Luke Hodge was named the Norm Smith medalist (best on ground) with 10 votes, for his 35 possessions and two goals. He edged fellow Hawthorn midfielders Jordan Lewis (37 possessions, seven clearances, seven rebounds) and Sam Mitchell (33 possessions, seven clearances, nine tackles), both with 9 votes. It was Hodge's second Norm Smith Medal, having also won it in 2008. Minor votes went to Josh Gibson (32 disposals, six rebounds) and Will Langford (three goals, six inside-50s). No Sydney players polled votes.

Chaired by Nathan Buckley, the voters and their choices were as follows:

Voter	Role	3 votes	2 votes	1 vote
Nathan Buckley	Collingwood Coach	Jordan Lewis	Sam Mitchell	Josh Gibson
Anthony Hudson	SEN	Sam Mitchell	Luke Hodge	Jordan Lewis
Chris Johnson	3AW	Luke Hodge	Sam Mitchell	Will Langford
Cameron Ling	Channel 7	Luke Hodge	Jordan Lewis	Sam Mitchell
Craig O'Donoghue	The West Australian	Jordan Lewis	Luke Hodge	Sam Mitchell

== Teams ==
Sydney did not change its team from the previous week's preliminary final, while Hawthorn omitted Jonathon Ceglar and Jonathan Simpkin in favour of Cyril Rioli and Ben McEvoy. Rioli was returning to the team after missing almost three months with a hamstring injury; he had appeared for Box Hill for limited playing time in the previous week's VFL Grand Final, which was his only match practice leading to his selection.

Sydney	Hawthorn

Sydney
B:	40 Nick Smith	25 Ted Richards	9 Nick Malceski
HB:	16 Gary Rohan	39 Heath Grundy	24 Dane Rampe
C:	15 Kieren Jack	12 Josh Kennedy	21 Ben McGlynn
HF:	4 Dan Hannebery	23 Lance Franklin	7 Harry Cunningham
F:	37 Adam Goodes	8 Kurt Tippett	20 Sam Reid
Foll:	38 Mike Pyke	26 Luke Parker	3 Jarrad McVeigh (c)
Int:	2 Rhyce Shaw	32 Lewis Jetta	44 Jake Lloyd
Int:	14 Craig Bird (sub)		
Coach:	John Longmire		

Hawthorn
B:	6 Josh Gibson	17 Brian Lake	14 Grant Birchall
HB:	27 Matthew Spangher	24 Ben Stratton	15 Luke Hodge (c)
C:	3 Jordan Lewis	5 Sam Mitchell	16 Isaac Smith
HF:	22 Luke Breust	19 Jack Gunston	33 Cyril Rioli
F:	7 Ben McEvoy	2 Jarryd Roughead	28 Paul Puopolo
Foll:	20 David Hale	26 Liam Shiels	9 Shaun Burgoyne
Int:	4 Matt Suckling	10 Bradley Hill	29 Will Langford
Int:	8 Taylor Duryea (sub)		
Coach:	Alastair Clarkson		

Umpires

The umpiring panel, comprising three field umpires, four boundary umpires, two goal umpires and an emergency in each position is given below. Most notable among the umpiring appointments was goal umpire Chris Appleton's selection for his first grand final, who had repaired his career after serving a suspension in 2010 for breaking the AFL's anti-gambling rules by placing bets on an AFL game in which he was not umpiring.

2014 AFL Grand Final umpires
Position	Umpire 1	Umpire 2	Umpire 3	Umpire 4	Emergency
Field:	21 Simon Meredith (3)	15 Mathew Nicholls (2)	9 Matt Stevic (2)		Troy Pannell
Boundary:	Ian Burrows (5)	Nathan Doig (3)	Mark Thomson (5)	Matthew Tomkins (1)	Christopher Gordon
Goal:	Chris Appleton (1)	Luke Walker (6)			Chelsea Roffey

Numbers in brackets represent the number of Grand Finals umpired, including 2014.

== Scorecard ==
Grand Final
Saturday, 27 September (2:30 pm)	Sydney	def. by	Hawthorn	MCG (crowd: 99,460)	Report
2.3 (15); 5.3 (33); 8.5 (53); 11.8 (74)	Q1; Q2; Q3; Final	5.5 (35); 11.9 (75); 16.11 (107); 21.11 (137)	Umpires: Meredith, Nicholls, Stevic; Norm Smith Medal: Luke Hodge; Television broadcast: Seven Network; National anthem: Olivia Newton-John
Franklin: 4 Goodes, Jack: 2 Kennedy, Tippett, McGlynn: 1	Goals	5: Roughead; 3: Breust, Langford; 2: Burgoyne, Gunston, Hodge; 1: Hale, Hill, Puopolo, Suckling
Franklin, Malceski, Kennedy, Shaw, Goodes	Best	Hodge, Lewis, Mitchell, Roughead, Hill, Lake, Langford, Burgoyne
Jetta (concussion)	Injuries

== Media coverage ==
The match was televised by the Seven Network. The coverage commentators included Brian Taylor, Matthew Richardson, Cameron Ling, Tom Harley, Luke Darcy and Leigh Matthews.

The match commentary was conducted by Bruce McAvaney and Dennis Cometti for the Seven Network, marking the duo's sixth grand final appearance together as commentators since 2008 and their tenth overall. Individually, it was Cometti's sixteenth grand final and McAvaney's fourteenth.

A total of 2,813,000 people watched the Grand Final on television, making the Grand Final the most viewed television broadcast of the day.

== See also ==
- 2014 AFL finals series
- 2014 AFL season
