= Bradley Hill (footballer) =

Australian rules footballer (born 1993)

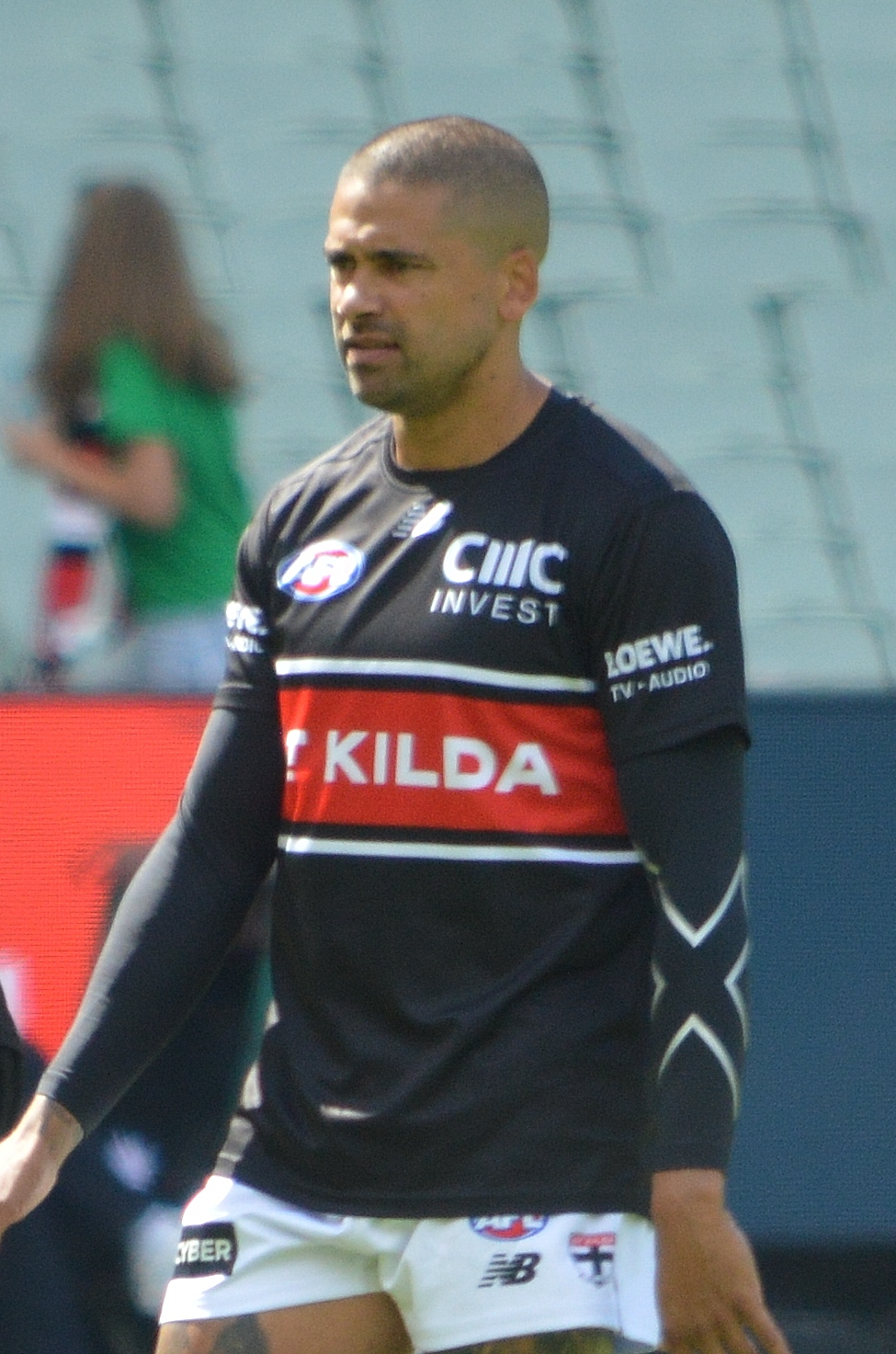
- Hill playing for St Kilda in 2026

Personal information
- Full name: Bradley Hill
- Born: 9 July 1993 (age 33)
- Original team: West Perth (WAFL)
- Draft: No. 33, 2011 national draft
- Debut: Round 4, 2012, Hawthorn vs. West Coast, at Subiaco Oval
- Height: 179 cm (5 ft 10 in)
- Weight: 78 kg (172 lb)
- Position: Wingman

Club information
- Current club: St Kilda
- Number: 8

Playing career^{1}
Years	Club	Games (Goals)
2012–2016	Hawthorn	95 (58)
2017–2019	Fremantle	54 (21)
2020–	St Kilda	151 (39)
Total		300 (118)

Representative team honours
Years	Team	Games (Goals)
2013–2025	Indigenous All-Stars	3 (1)
2020	All-Stars	1 (1)
2026	Western Australia	1 (1)
- ^{1} Playing statistics correct to the end of the 2026 season.

Career highlights
- 3× AFL premiership player: 2013, 2014, 2015; Doig Medal: 2017; Ian Stewart Medal: 2026; AFL Rising Star nomination: 2013

Bradley Hill (born 9 July 1993) is a professional Australian rules footballer playing for the St Kilda Football Club in the Australian Football League (AFL). He previously played for the Hawthorn Football Club from 2012 to 2016, and for the Fremantle Football Club between 2017 and 2019. He is a very quick running player who plays as a wingman.

== AFL career ==
=== Hawthorn: 2012–2016 ===
Hill was drafted to Hawthorn with the 33rd selection in 2011 AFL draft from the West Perth Football Club in the WAFL. He is the younger brother of former Fremantle player Stephen Hill, and the second cousin of former Western Bulldogs and West Coast forward Joshua Hill. He is also the cousin of Collingwood forward Bobby Hill.

He made his debut for Hawthorn against West Coast in round 4 of the 2012 AFL season at Patersons Stadium. He was the substitute player and replaced David Hale in the final quarter. Hill kicked 3 goals in his 5 matches for the year.

In the 2013 AFL season Hill switched to the number 10 guernsey and cemented his spot in the starting line-up, playing 24 out of 25 games and kicking 18 goals. The performance that won him a 2013 AFL Rising Star nomination was his 17 disposal and two goal effort in Hawthorn's thrilling win against the Crows at AAMI Stadium in round 6.

Hill's good form continued and he was selected for Hawthorn in the 2013 AFL Grand Final at the M.C.G. in front of 100,007 people. In the first quarter Hill passed the ball from the boundary to Jack Gunston in front of goals, which then provided Hawthorn with the first goal of the game. He then repeated the trick in the 3rd quarter when Gunston pounced upon the spilt ball to spin around and kick his 4th goal to re-establish Hawthorn's lead going into the final stanza. Hill also kicked the sealer halfway through the final quarter, running into an open goal to ensure Paul Puopolo's bouncing kick went through, thus giving Hawthorn a 5-goal lead which Fremantle could not overcome.

=== Fremantle: 2017–2019 ===
At the end of the 2016 season, Hill was traded to Fremantle, joining his brother Stephen. Under coach Ross Lyon, Hill won the 2017 Doig Medal, Fremantle's best-and-fairest award, in his first season at the club. In Round 20, 2019 Hill had an outstanding game collecting 27 disposals and having 6 rebound 50s. He claimed that this was his best game since he has been at Fremantle.

=== St Kilda: 2020–present ===
In mid 2019, Hill spoke to his manager about seeking a trade to a Victorian-based team at the end of the season. It was understood that Hill wanted to return to Victoria, where he played for the Hawks from 2012 to 2016, for family reasons. As a result, there was significant media speculation throughout the second half of 2019 surrounding Hill's future at Fremantle. Hill eventually requested a trade to St Kilda following interest from several Victorian clubs. Trade negotiations between Fremantle and St Kilda were protracted and subject to significant public discussion during the 2019 Trade Period. Eventually, on the final day of trading, Hill officially joined the Saints on 16 October in a complicated trade with draft picks 10 and 58, a 2020 second round pick and the Saints' Blake Acres traded to the Dockers in return for Hill and a 2020 third round pick.

Hill played all 19 possible games in his first season for the Saints (including two finals) in a COVID interrupted season which also saw shorter 16-minute quarters.

Hill played all 22 possible games for the Saints in 2021 and finished equal fifth in the Trevor Barker Award.

== Trivia ==
In 2013, the Hill brothers became the first siblings to play against each other in a Grand Final since the 1912 VFL Grand Final.

== Statistics ==
Updated to the end of round 22, 2026.

Legend
G	Goals	K	Kicks	D	Disposals	T	Tackles
B	Behinds	H	Handballs	M	Marks
#	Played in that season's premiership team

Season	Team	No.	Games	Totals							Averages (per game)							Votes
Season	Team	No.	Games	G	B	K	H	D	M	T	G	B	K	H	D	M	T	Votes
2012	Hawthorn	32	5	3	4	36	14	50	9	3	0.6	0.8	7.2	2.8	10.0	1.8	0.6	0
2013^{#}	Hawthorn	10	24	18	5	246	141	387	71	50	0.8	0.2	10.3	5.9	16.1	3.0	2.1	0
2014^{#}	Hawthorn	10	22	10	6	256	193	449	88	53	0.5	0.3	11.6	8.8	20.4	4.0	2.4	2
2015^{#}	Hawthorn	10	24	16	9	292	185	477	93	48	0.7	0.4	12.2	7.7	19.9	3.9	2.0	4
2016	Hawthorn	10	20	11	13	220	128	348	61	57	0.6	0.7	11.0	6.4	17.4	3.1	2.9	0
2017	Fremantle	9	22	13	14	362	156	518	139	45	0.6	0.6	16.5	7.1	23.5	6.3	2.0	4
2018	Fremantle	9	10	2	2	148	59	207	48	27	0.2	0.2	14.8	5.9	20.7	4.8	2.7	1
2019	Fremantle	9	22	6	8	392	160	552	81	50	0.3	0.4	17.8	7.3	25.1	3.7	2.3	4
2020 (Note: The 2020 season was played with 17 home-and-away matches per team (down from 22) and 16-minute quarters with time on (down from 20-minute quarters with time on) due to the impact of the COVID-19 pandemic.)	St Kilda	8	19	2	3	201	91	292	64	27	0.1	0.2	10.6	4.8	15.4	3.4	1.4	2
2021	St Kilda	8	22	3	1	279	155	434	86	51	0.1	0.0	12.7	7.0	19.7	3.9	2.3	4
2022	St Kilda	8	21	6	4	264	176	440	100	37	0.3	0.2	12.6	8.4	21.0	4.8	1.8	4
2023	St Kilda	8	22	6	5	271	184	455	103	43	0.3	0.2	12.3	8.4	20.7	4.7	2.0	0
2024	St Kilda	8	22	7	5	272	155	427	118	35	0.3	0.2	12.4	7.0	19.4	5.4	1.6	5
2025	St Kilda	8	22	6	5	279	152	431	116	35	0.3	0.2	12.7	6.9	19.6	5.3	1.6	0
2026	St Kilda	8	21	9	4	348	199	547	138	37	0.4	0.2	16.6	9.5	26.0	6.6	1.8	0
Career			298	118	88	3866	2148	6014	1315	598	0.4	0.3	13.0	7.2	20.2	4.4	2.0	30

== Honours and achievements ==
Team

- 2× Minor premiership (Hawthorn): 2012, 2013
- 3× AFL premiership player (Hawthorn): 2013, 2014, 2015

Individual

- Doig Medal: 2017
- Ian Stewart Medal: 2026
- 3× Indigenous All-Stars team: 2013, 2015, 2025
- All-Stars team: 2020
- AFL Rising Star nominee: 2013
