= 1998 Hawthorn Football Club season =

74th season in the Australian Football League

Hawthorn Football Club
1998 season
- President: Ian Dicker
- Coach: Ken Judge
- Captain: Jason Dunstall
- Home ground: Waverley Park
- AFL season: 8–14 (13th)
- Finals series: Did not qualify
- Best and Fairest: Shane Crawford
- Leading goalkicker: Jason Dunstall (54)
- Highest home attendance: 42,780 (Round 10 vs. Essendon)
- Lowest home attendance: 18,698 (Round 2 vs. Port Adelaide)
- Average home attendance: 32,173

The 1998 season was the Hawthorn Football Club's 74th season in the Australian Football League and 97th overall.

== Fixture ==
=== Premiership season ===
Rd	Date and local time	Opponent	Scores (Hawthorn's scores indicated in bold)			Venue	Attendance	Record
Rd	Date and local time	Opponent	Home	Away	Result	Venue	Attendance	Record
1	Saturday, 28 March (3:40 pm)	Collingwood	18.15 (123)	**12.12 (84)**	Lost by 39 points	Melbourne Cricket Ground (A)	47,628	0–1
2	Saturday, 4 April (2:10 pm)	Port Adelaide	**10.7 (67)**	17.10 (112)	Lost by 45 points	Waverley Park (H)	18,698	0–2
3	Saturday, 11 April (3:40 pm)	Richmond	15.13 (103)	**15.7 (97)**	Lost by 6 points	Melbourne Cricket Ground (A)	39,954	0–3
4	Saturday, 18 April (3:40 pm)	St Kilda	**18.13 (121)**	20.9 (129)	Lost by 8 points	Waverley Park (H)	36,117	0–4
5	Saturday, 25 April (2:10 pm)	Brisbane Lions	**18.16 (124)**	12.11 (83)	Won by 41 points	Waverley Park (H)	22,366	1–4
6	Saturday, 2 May (2:10 pm)	Geelong	13.12 (90)	**10.13 (73)**	Lost by 17 points	Kardinia Park (A)	23,267	1–5
7	Friday, 8 May (6:40 pm)	Fremantle	8.9 (57)	**15.9 (99)**	Won by 42 points	WACA (A)	22,037	2–5
8	Sunday, 17 May (2:10 pm)	Western Bulldogs	**14.12 (96)**	21.10 (136)	Lost by 40 points	Waverley Park (H)	34,541	2–6
9	Sunday, 24 May (2:40 pm)	Sydney	17.15 (117)	**11.14 (80)**	Lost by 37 points	Sydney Cricket Ground (A)	31,420	2–7
10	Saturday, 30 May (3:40 pm)	Essendon	**13.9 (87)**	13.15 (93)	Lost by 6 points	Waverley Park (H)	41,780	2–8
11	Saturday, 6 June (2:10 pm)	Melbourne	**10.10 (70)**	18.9 (117)	Lost by 47 points	Waverley Park (H)	31,365	2–9
12	Friday, 12 June (8:40 pm)	West Coast	19.9 (123)	**17.6 (108)**	Lost by 15 points	WACA (A)	27,112	2–10
13	Saturday, 20 June (2:10 pm)	North Melbourne	**17.12 (114)**	17.10 (112)	Won by 2 points	Waverley Park (H)	23,845	3–10
14	Saturday, 27 June (2:10 pm)	Carlton	13.14 (92)	**11.10 (76)**	Lost by 16 points	Optus Oval (A)	25,529	3–11
15	Sunday, 5 July (2:40 pm)	Adelaide	9.14 (68)	**4.11 (35)**	Lost by 33 points	Football Park (A)	38,430	3–12
16	Saturday, 18 July (7:40 pm)	Collingwood	**4.14 (38)**	19.10 (124)	Lost by 86 points	Waverley Park (H)	39,325	3–13
17	Saturday, 25 July (8:40 pm)	Port Adelaide	18.11 (119)	**15.8 (98)**	Lost by 21 points	Football Park (A)	30,104	3–14
18	Sunday, 2 August (2:10 pm)	Richmond	**10.10 (70)**	4.10 (34)	Won by 36 points	Waverley Park (H)	37,297	4–14
19	Saturday, 8 August (2:10 pm)	St Kilda	10.9 (69)	**19.14 (128)**	Won by 59 points	Waverley Park (A)	32,286	5–14
20	Saturday, 15 August (7:40 pm)	Brisbane Lions	7.17 (59)	**13.16 (94)**	Won by 35 points	The Gabba (A)	14,738	6–14
21	Sunday, 23 August (2:10 pm)	Geelong	**11.18 (84)**	8.15 (63)	Won by 21 points	Waverley Park (H)	28,833	7–14
22	Saturday, 29 August (2:10 pm)	Fremantle	**22.17 (149)**	9.6 (60)	Won by 89 points	Waverley Park (H)	39,735	8–14

== Ladder ==
(P)	Premiers
	Qualified for finals

#	Team	P	W	L	D	PF	PA	%	Pts
1	North Melbourne	22	16	6	0	2486	2117	117.4	64
2	Western Bulldogs	22	15	7	0	2353	2019	116.5	60
3	Sydney	22	14	8	0	2283	2143	106.5	56
4	Melbourne	22	14	8	0	2009	1956	102.7	56
5	Adelaide (P)	22	13	9	0	2172	1763	123.2	52
6	St Kilda	22	13	9	0	2148	2104	102.1	52
7	West Coast	22	12	10	0	1940	1773	109.4	48
8	Essendon	22	12	10	0	2250	2071	108.6	48
9	Richmond	22	12	10	0	2018	1926	104.8	48
10	Port Adelaide	22	9	12	1	1928	2017	95.6	38
11	Carlton	22	9	13	0	2018	2109	95.7	36
12	Geelong	22	9	13	0	1777	1963	90.5	36
13	Hawthorn	22	8	14	0	1992	2083	95.6	32
14	Collingwood	22	7	15	0	1968	2167	90.8	28
15	Fremantle	22	7	15	0	1739	2277	76.4	28
16	Brisbane Lions	22	5	16	1	1860	2453	75.8	22

Rules for classification: 1. premiership points; 2. percentage; 3. points for
Average score: 93.6
Source: AFL Tables
