= Will Langford =

Australian rules footballer (born 1992)

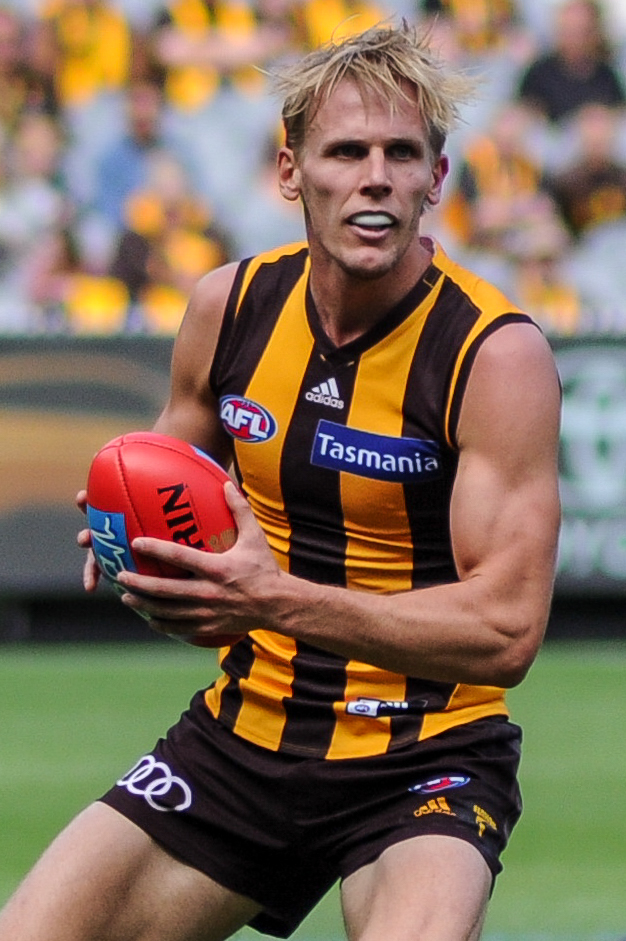
- Langford playing for Hawthorn in April 2017

Personal information
- Full name: William Langford
- Born: 3 July 1992 (age 34)
- Original team: UNSW-ES Bulldogs
- Draft: No. 85, 2011 rookie draft
- Debut: Round 17, 2013, Hawthorn vs. Western Bulldogs, at Aurora Stadium
- Height: 187 cm (6 ft 2 in)
- Weight: 83 kg (183 lb)
- Position: Midfielder

Playing career^{1}
Years	Club	Games (Goals)
2011–2018	Hawthorn	72 (24)
- ^{1} Playing statistics correct to the end of 2018.

Career highlights
- AFL premiership player: 2014; VFL premiership player: 2013

William Langford (born 3 July 1992) is a former Australian rules footballer who played for the Hawthorn Football Club in the Australian Football League (AFL).

== Early life ==
Will Langford was born in Sydney to mother Eleanor and father Chris, Hawthorn Team of the Century backman. Chris had moved to Sydney late in his AFL career to pursue a career as an accountant, and it was there that his kids were raised.

Will played his junior football for East Sydney Bulldogs before progressing to UNSW-ES Bulldogs senior football in the Sydney AFL whilst his progress was monitored by AFL recruiters.

Touted as a father-son prospect Langford was instead recruited to the AFL's Hawthorn Football Club as a part of the AFL’s now defunct NSW Scholarship programme in the 2011 Rookie draft.

== AFL career ==
Langford suffered chronic fatigue syndrome in his first year at the Hawks in 2011. After an impressive season in Box Hill in defence in 2012, he was shifted into the midfield and impressing early in the 2013 season, he was elevated to the senior list along with John Ceglar after Hawks players Ryan Schoenmakers and Matt Suckling were placed on the club's long term injury list. and played one senior game against the Western Bulldogs in round 17 at Launceston's Aurora Stadium. Langford continued his solid form with Box Hill throughout the 2013 season, culminating in playing in the club's second VFL Premiership against Geelong.

=== Promotion to senior list ===
He was promoted to the main player list for 2014. Hawthorn used pick 71 in the 2013 AFL draft. In 2014 Langford started the season in the seniors showing at times the VFL form from the previous year. He lost his spot mid year and returned to Box Hill and told to work on several parts of his game. Within a month he had returned the seniors and became one of Hawthorn's best reliable midfielders after shutting out Geelong captain Joel Selwood in a round 22 clash and a best on ground performance in the Preliminary Final shutting down Port Adelaide captain Travis Boak and a dominating display in the 2014 AFL Grand Final where he kicked 3 goals and collected 21 disposals. The Hawks won by 63 points and he was listed as one of the best players.

Langford enjoyed career-high kicking and marking figures in 2017 and his best since 2014 when he was the star of the finals series. He was one of the few bright lights early in the season when the Hawks were being trounced. His goalkicking became erratic missing what should have been easy set shots put his teammates under pressure. He played only six senior games in 2018, suffering a season ending hamstring injury.

On 30 October 2018, Langford was delisted by Hawthorn and subsequently retired.

== Statistics ==
Legend
G	Goals	K	Kicks	D	Disposals	T	Tackles
B	Behinds	H	Handballs	M	Marks

Season	Team	No.	Games	Totals							Averages (per game)							Votes
Season	Team	No.	Games	G	B	K	H	D	M	T	G	B	K	H	D	M	T	Votes
2011	Hawthorn	48	0	—	—	—	—	—	—	—	—	—	—	—	—	—	—	—
2012	Hawthorn	48	0	—	—	—	—	—	—	—	—	—	—	—	—	—	—	—
2013	Hawthorn	29	1	0	1	3	1	4	1	3	0.0	1.0	3.0	1.0	4.0	1.0	3.0	0
2014^{#}	Hawthorn	29	19	9	8	166	199	365	35	90	0.5	0.4	8.7	10.5	19.2	1.8	4.7	1
2015	Hawthorn	29	13	4	7	125	126	251	26	56	0.3	0.5	9.6	9.7	19.3	2.0	4.3	0
2016	Hawthorn	29	13	4	4	118	106	224	31	65	0.3	0.3	9.1	8.2	17.2	8.2	5.0	0
2017	Hawthorn	29	20	7	15	196	166	362	65	70	0.4	0.8	9.8	8.3	18.1	3.3	3.5	0
2018	Hawthorn	29	6	0	1	36	31	67	12	11	0.0	0.2	6.0	5.2	11.2	2.0	1.8	0
Career			72	24	36	644	629	1273	170	295	0.3	0.5	8.9	8.7	17.7	2.4	4.1	1

== Honours and achievements ==
Team

- AFL premiership player (Hawthorn): 2014
- Minor premiership (Hawthorn): 2013
- VFL premiership player (Box Hill): 2013
- Minor premiership (Box Hill): 2015

== Family ==
He is the son of Hawthorn Team of the Century backman Chris Langford, who represented the club in 303 games, including 4 premierships, and is currently a member of the AFL Commission. Will's younger brother, Lachlan Langford, was rookied by the Hawks in the 2015 AFL rookie draft. It was the first time brothers had been on the Hawthorn list since Shane and Justin Crawford in 1998. With Will's premiership in 2014, the Langfords became the second father/son premiership players at the club after Peter and Paul Hudson in 1971 and 1991 respectively.

His uncle, Tom Langford, was a prominent VFL player, mainly with Port Melbourne, from 2006-2017 before becoming a development coach with Richmond.
