= Oliver Hanrahan =

Australian rules footballer (born 1998)

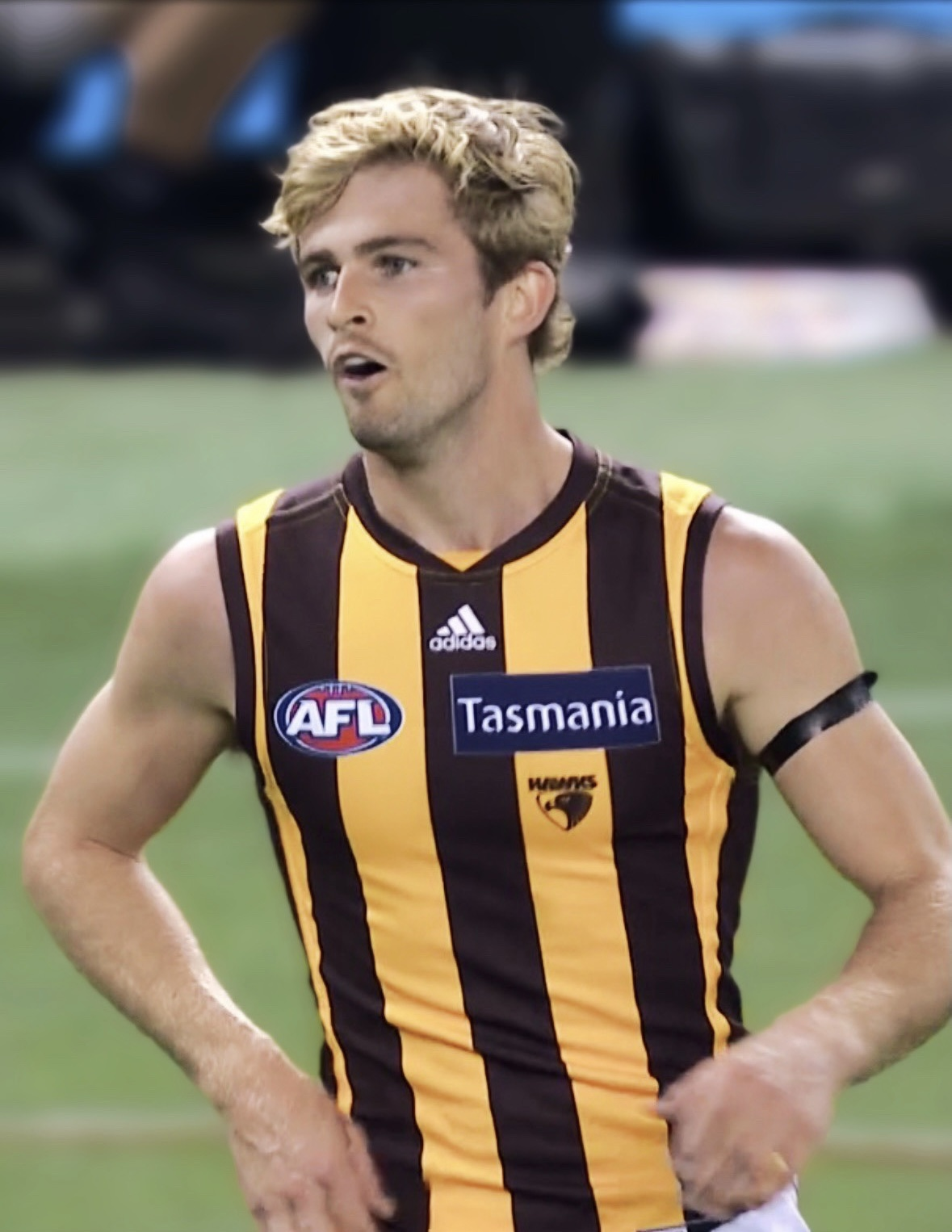
- Hanrahan playing for Hawthorn

Personal information
- Full name: Oliver Hanrahan
- Born: 27 August 1998 (age 28); Fitzroy
- Original team: St Kevin's College
- Draft: No. 14, 2016 AFL draft
- Debut: Round 15, 2019, Hawthorn vs. West Coast, at Melbourne Cricket Ground
- Height: 183 cm (6 ft 0 in)
- Weight: 80 kg (176 lb)
- Position: Forward

Playing career^{1}
Years	Club	Games (Goals)
2017–2021	Hawthorn	29 (18)
- ^{1} Playing statistics correct to the end of 2021.

Career highlights
- VFL premiership player: 2018; Hawthorn Best First Year Player Award

Oliver Daniel Hanrahan (born 27 August 1998) is a professional Australian rules football player who most recently played with the Hawthorn Football Club in the Australian Football League (AFL). He was recruited to Hawthorn with pick 14 in the 2016 AFL draft.

== Early life ==
Hanrahan was born in Fitzroy, Victoria where he then grew up in Brighton East. In his earlier days he was very well known for his cricket abilities, being a talented all rounder for the St Kevin's College 1st XI as well as playing for the Melbourne Cricket Club in the Victorian Premier Cricket competition. Hanrahan was drafted straight from school football in the APS competition after quitting the Sandringham Dragons (TAC cup) due to cricket commitments. He played for St Kevin's College 1st XVIII where he made his debut as a 15 year old.

== AFL career ==
The forward began to learn the craft at VFL level and finished with 19 goals for the season. His goal in the dying seconds of the elimination final against Port Melbourne gave the win for the Hawks. Three weeks later they were premiers.

Hanrahan made his AFL debut in round 15, 2019, against West Coast at the MCG. He kicked a goal in his debut match. Following the 2021 season, He was told by Hawthorn that he would have to wait until the end of the trade period to see if he would get another contract. He would be delisted by Hawthorn on 15 October 2021.

At the start of the 2022 AFL season, Hanrahan was added to the Sydney Swans top-up list.

== Statistics ==
Statistics are correct to the end of 2021.

Legend
G	Goals	K	Kicks	D	Disposals	T	Tackles
B	Behinds	H	Handballs	M	Marks

Season	Team	No.	Games	Totals							Averages (per game)							Votes
Season	Team	No.	Games	G	B	K	H	D	M	T	G	B	K	H	D	M	T	Votes
2017	Hawthorn	41	0	—	—	—	—	—	—	—	—	—	—	—	—	—	—	0
2018	Hawthorn	41	0	—	—	—	—	—	—	—	—	—	—	—	—	—	—	0
2019	Hawthorn	41	9	7	4	68	50	118	27	9	0.8	0.4	7.6	5.6	13.1	3.0	1.0	0
2020 (Note: The 2020 season was played with 17 home-and-away matches per team (down from 22) and 16-minute quarters with time on (down from 20-minute quarters with time on) due to the impact of the COVID-19 pandemic.)	Hawthorn	41	7	3	4	44	31	75	10	7	0.4	0.6	6.3	4.4	10.7	1.4	1.0	0
2021	Hawthorn	13	13	8	6	71	70	141	31	13	0.6	0.5	5.5	5.4	10.8	2.4	1.0	0
Career			29	18	14	183	151	334	68	29	0.6	0.5	6.3	5.2	11.5	2.3	1.0	0

== Honours and achievements ==
Team

- VFL premiership player (Box Hill): 2018

Individual

- Hawthorn best first year player (debut season): 2019
