= Jarryd Roughead =

Australian rules footballer & coach (born 1987)

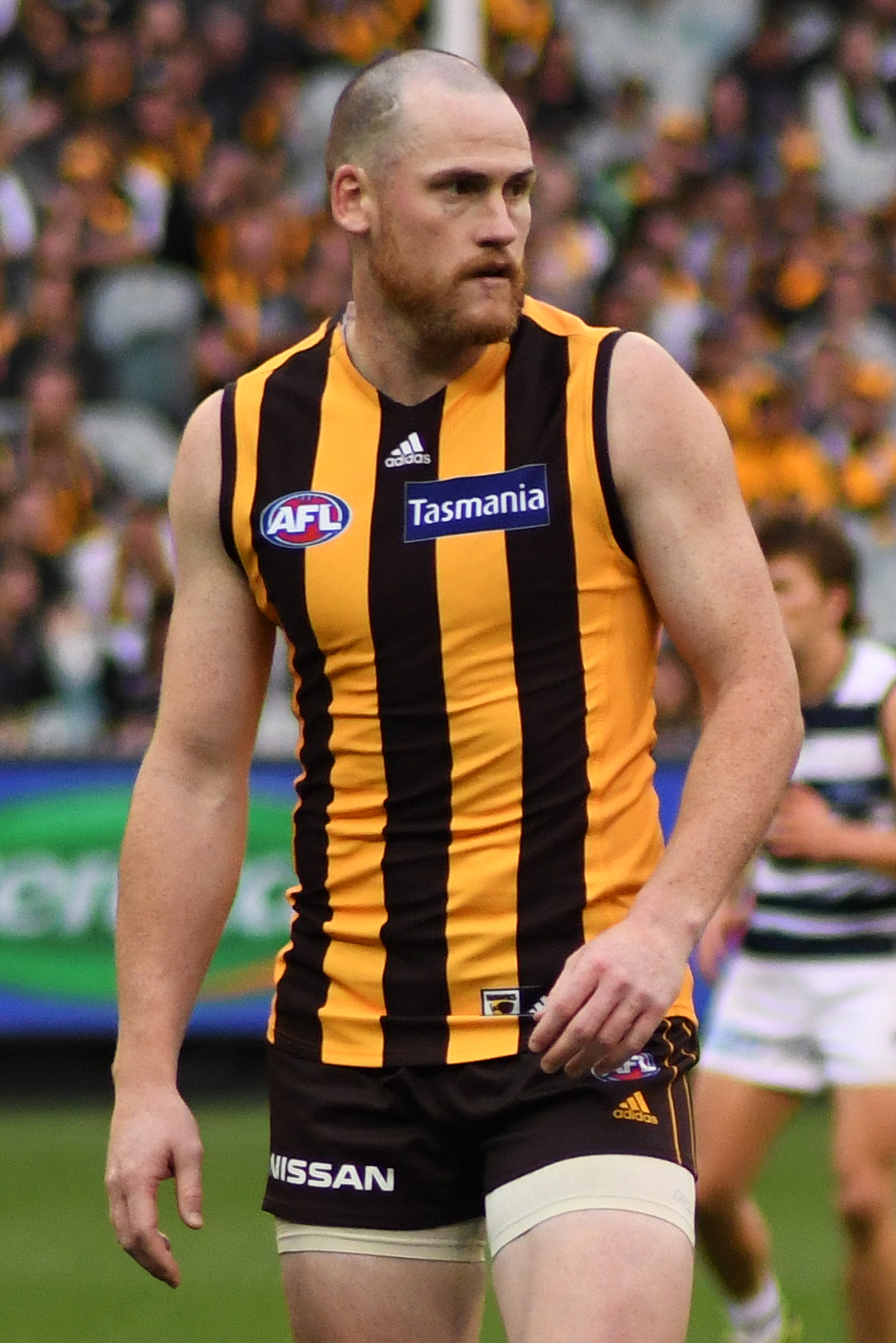
- Roughead playing for Hawthorn in April 2019

Personal information
- Full name: Jarryd Roughead
- Nicknames: Roughy, Roughnut
- Born: 23 January 1987 (age 39); Leongatha, Victoria
- Original teams: Leongatha (GFL); Gippsland Power (TAC Cup)
- Draft: No. 2 (PP), 2004 national draft
- Debut: Round 3, 2005, Hawthorn vs. Essendon, at Melbourne Cricket Ground
- Height: 193 cm (6 ft 4 in)
- Weight: 98 kg (216 lb)
- Position: Forward / Ruckman

Playing career^{1}
Years	Club	Games (Goals)
2005–2019	Hawthorn	283 (578)

International team honours^{2}
Years	Team	Games (Goals)
2015	Australia	1 (0)
- ^{1} Playing statistics correct to the end of 2019.^{2} Representative statistics correct as of 2015.

Career highlights
- 4× AFL premiership player: 2008, 2013, 2014, 2015; Coleman Medal: 2013; 2× All-Australian team: 2013, 2014; Hawthorn captain: 2017–2018; 3× Hawthorn leading goalkicker: 2013, 2014, 2017; Fox Footy Longest Kick winner: 2021

Jarryd Roughead (born 23 January 1987) is an Australian rules football coach and former player. He was formerly an assistant coach with the St Kilda Football Club in the Australian Football League (AFL). He played for the Hawthorn Football Club in the AFL and was the club's captain from 2017–2018. He retired in 2019.

== Early and personal life ==
Born in Leongatha in southern Gippsland, Roughead played for the Gippsland Power. After the under 18s season finished, Roughead helped his local team, Leongatha, win the WGLFL premiership.

Roughead is friends with Australian basketball players Joe Ingles and Patty Mills.

His cousin, Jordan Roughead, played for the Collingwood Football Club and Western Bulldogs Football Club.

Roughead is married and has a daughter & a son.

== AFL career ==
=== 2004–2007: Introduction to senior football ===
Roughead was recruited to Hawthorn with the 2nd overall pick in the 2004 AFL draft. he was selected by Hawthorn along with future dual-club superstar Lance Franklin. Both Roughead and Franklin were to be key members of Hawthorn's line up as they grew older.

In Round 19, 2005, Roughhead was nominated for the AFL Rising Star award. He collected 20 disposals in a 41-point loss against the Brisbane Lions.

=== 2007–2009: Hitting form ===
In 2007, Roughhead finished the season with a career-high of 40 goals in 22 games. However, along with his 40 majors, Roughead's goal accuracy was at 52.6 percent that year, a mark considered to not be very good.

During his career, Roughhead has shown that he has the tremendous athletic capability with a huge leap and clean marking hands. In the 2008 AFL season, he kicked 75 goals from 25 matches. Despite having the ability to work as a member of Hawthorn's defence, he became a regular centre half-forward for Hawthorn.

In 2008, he played in his first AFL Grand Final, despite his struggles to collect the ball at times, Roughead finished the match with a respectable 2 goals against Geelong.

Roughhead kicked a career-high 8 goals in a slim 5 point victory over the Carlton Blues.

=== 2011–2012: Injuries ===
In 2011, Roughhead played in a ruck position as well as the forward line due to Hawthorn's injury list. In their Round 12 clash against Geelong, he ruptured his Achilles tendon during the final quarter of the match. Roughead was stretchered off the ground and was ruled out for the remainder of the 2011 AFL season. He finished the season with 16 goals.

He spent the majority of the 2012 AFL season sharing the ruck duties with David Hale (footballer). When not in the ruck, he was position in the forward line, but also assisted in defence as the need arose.

=== 2013–2015: Medals and premierships ===
In 2013, Roughead was awarded the Coleman Medal for being the leading goalkicker after kicking 68 goals at the completion of the home and away season. He managed to achieve this whilst spending considerable time in the ruck as well as in the midfield alongside his rucking partners.

He kicked two goals in Hawthorn's qualifying final against Sydney and another two goals in the AFL Grand Final against Fremantle which resulted in Hawthorn's second premiership of the century.

Following 2013, Roughhead was a member of Hawthorn's Grand Final winning sides in 2014 and 2015, notably kicking 5 goals against the Sydney Swans in the 2014 Grand Final.

=== 2016–2019: Career conclusion ===
Roughhead missed most of the 2016 AFL season due to cancer complications.

On 20 January 2017, Roughead was named the captain of Hawthorn.

On 12 August 2019, Roughead announced he would retire from AFL football at the conclusion of the 2019 season. In his last match, he kicked 6 goals against the Gold Coast Suns.

== Illness ==
Midway through the 2015 season, Roughead was ruled out for three weeks after it was revealed he had a melanoma removed from his lip. On May 17, 2016, Roughead was diagnosed with a recurrence of Melanoma and was sidelined indefinitely. Roughead has four small spots on his lung and a biopsy confirmed a diagnosis of melanoma. In December, after 8 months of immunotherapy, Roughead revealed on the Hawthorn website that he was cancer-free, and had been given the all-clear to return to football.

== Statistics ==
Legend
G	Goals	K	Kicks	D	Disposals	T	Tackles
B	Behinds	H	Handballs	M	Marks	H/O	Hit-outs
#	Played in that season's premiership team	†	Led the league for the season

Season	Team	No.	Games	Totals								Averages (per game)								Votes
Season	Team	No.	Games	G	B	K	H	D	M	T	H/O	G	B	K	H	D	M	T	H/O	Votes
2005	Hawthorn	35	16	6	5	104	79	183	66	10	8	0.4	0.3	6.5	4.9	11.4	4.1	0.6	0.5	0
2006	Hawthorn	2	20	12	5	151	108	259	108	29	4	0.6	0.3	7.6	5.4	13.0	5.4	1.5	0.2	0
2007	Hawthorn	2	22	40	36	117	85	202	77	29	37	1.8	1.6	5.3	3.9	9.2	3.5	1.3	1.7	2
2008^{#}	Hawthorn	2	25	75	51	223	100	323	147	50	33	3.0	2.0	8.9	4.0	12.9	5.9	2.0	1.3	7
2009	Hawthorn	2	19	51	27	150	93	243	87	40	39	2.7	1.4	7.9	4.9	12.8	4.6	2.1	2.1	4
2010	Hawthorn	2	23	53	46^{†}	192	94	286	114	43	28	2.3	2.0	8.3	4.1	12.4	5.0	1.9	1.2	0
2011	Hawthorn	2	11	16	6	104	72	176	52	44	83	1.5	0.5	9.5	6.5	16.0	4.7	4.0	7.5	0
2012	Hawthorn	2	23	41	28	227	165	392	105	64	222	1.8	1.2	9.9	7.2	17.0	4.6	2.8	9.7	4
2013^{#}	Hawthorn	2	25	72^{†}	34	259	144	403	112	58	60	2.9	1.4	10.4	5.8	16.1	4.5	2.3	2.4	13
2014^{#}	Hawthorn	2	23	75	43	247	120	367	107	68	17	3.3	1.9	10.7	5.2	16.0	4.7	3.0	0.7	11
2015^{#}	Hawthorn	2	24	50	34	263	201	464	120	76	20	2.1	1.4	11.0	8.3	19.3	5.0	3.2	0.8	9
2016	Hawthorn	2	0	—	—	—	—	—	—	—	—	—	—	—	—	—	—	—	—	—
2017	Hawthorn	2	22	38	21	193	199	392	109	75	27	1.7	1.0	8.8	9.0	17.9	5.0	3.4	1.2	6
2018	Hawthorn	2	22	34	24	189	147	336	88	58	67	1.5	1.1	8.6	6.7	15.3	4.0	2.6	3.0	1
2019	Hawthorn	2	8	15	10	60	39	99	28	19	19	1.9	1.3	7.5	4.9	12.4	3.5	2.4	2.4	2
Career			283	578	370	2479	1646	4125	1320	663	664	2.0	1.3	8.8	5.8	14.6	4.7	2.3	2.3	59

== Honours and achievements ==
Team

- 4× AFL premiership player (Hawthorn): 2008, 2013, 2014, 2015
- 2× Minor premiership (Hawthorn): 2012, 2013

Individual

- Coleman Medal: 2013
- 2× All-Australian team: 2013, 2014
- 3× Hawthorn leading goalkicker: 2013, 2014, 2017
- Hawthorn captain: 2017–2018
- Australia international rules football team: 2015
- Hawthorn most consistent player: 2008
- AFL Rising Star nominee: 2005
- Hawthorn life member

== Publications ==
In 2020, Roughead, assisted by sports journalist Peter Hanlon, published an autobiography entitled 'Roughy: The Autobiography', published with Viking Press.
