= Kaiden Brand =

Australian rules footballer

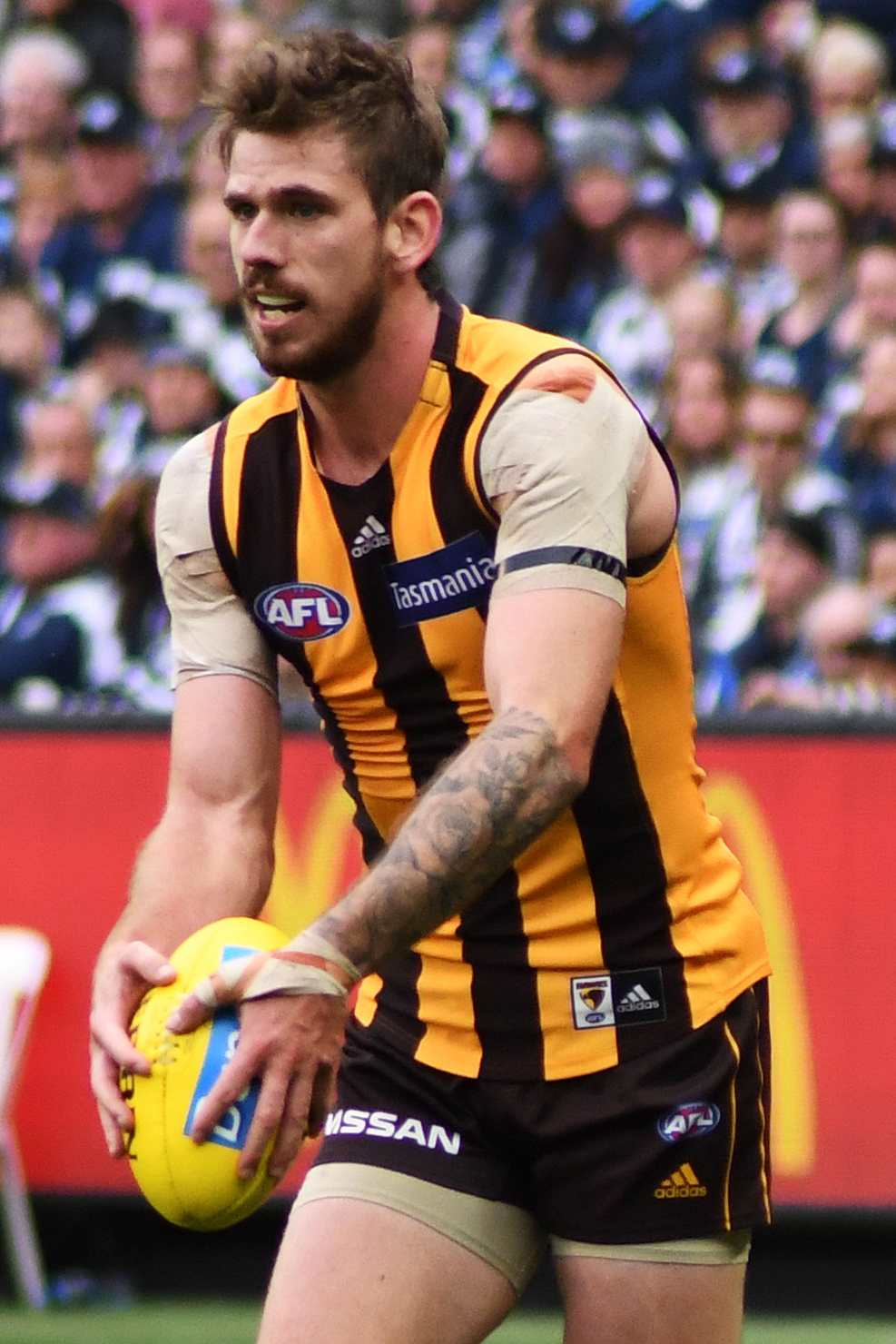
- Brand playing for Hawthorn in April 2019

Personal information
- Full name: Kaiden Brand
- Born: 8 April 1994 (age 32); Berri, South Australia
- Original team: West Adelaide
- Draft: No. 66, 2012 national draft
- Debut: Round 7, 2016, Hawthorn vs. Richmond, at Melbourne Cricket Ground
- Height: 198 cm (6 ft 6 in)
- Weight: 98 kg (216 lb)
- Position: Key defender

Playing career^{1}
| Years | Club | Games (Goals) |
| 2013–2019 | Hawthorn | 43 (0) |
| 2020–2021 | Sydney | 5 (0) |
- ^{1} Playing statistics correct to the end of 2021.

Career highlights
- Hawthorn best first year player: 2016; VFL premiership player: 2018; SANFL State Representative: 2022; West Adelaide Football Club Captain: 2023

Kaiden Brand (born 8 April 1994) is an Australian rules football player who plays with the West Adelaide Football Club in the South Australian National Football League. He previously played with the Hawthorn Football Club and Sydney Swans in the Australian Football League.

== AFL career ==
Hawthorn selected Brand with pick 66 in the 2012 AFL draft.

He spent 2013 developing in the VFL playing for Hawthorn's reserve affiliate side, the Box Hill, and was a member of their premiership winning side. In between seasons Brand bulked up considerably, played every game for 2014, mainly at full-back and performed well at Box Hill. Brand has elite pace, has the ability to play on talls and smalls and has solid foot skills.

Brand dislocated his left shoulder in the opening minute of his NAB Cup debut in 2015. With advice from the club, he had both shoulders reconstructed and missed the entire season.

He returned in good form in 2016 and with the retirement of Brian Lake a spot opened for him in the Hawthorn backline. A concussion to James Frawley meant he was promoted to play his AFL debut against Richmond.

Following the 2019 season, Brand was delisted by Hawthorn. He was later signed by Sydney as a delisted free agent. After spending 2 years at the Sydney Swans he returned home to South Australia to play for West Adelaide and was named captain in 2023.

== Statistics ==
Legend
| G | Goals | K | Kicks | D | Disposals | T | Tackles |
| B | Behinds | H | Handballs | M | Marks |

| Season | Team | No. | Games | Totals | | | | | | | Averages (per game) | | | | | | | Votes |
| Season | Team | No. | Games | G | B | K | H | D | M | T | G | B | K | H | D | M | T | Votes |
|---|---|---|---|---|---|---|---|---|---|---|---|---|---|---|---|---|---|---|
| 2013 | Hawthorn | 42 | 0 | — | — | — | — | — | — | — | — | — | — | — | — | — | — | 0 |
| 2014 | Hawthorn | 42 | 0 | — | — | — | — | — | — | — | — | — | — | — | — | — | — | 0 |
| 2015 | Hawthorn | 30 | 0 | — | — | — | — | — | — | — | — | — | — | — | — | — | — | 0 |
| 2016 | Hawthorn | 30 | 11 | 0 | 0 | 86 | 56 | 142 | 47 | 14 | 0.0 | 0.0 | 7.8 | 5.1 | 12.9 | 4.3 | 1.3 | 0 |
| 2017 | Hawthorn | 30 | 17 | 0 | 0 | 161 | 111 | 272 | 104 | 19 | 0.0 | 0.0 | 9.5 | 6.5 | 16.0 | 6.1 | 1.1 | 0 |
| 2018 | Hawthorn | 30 | 10 | 0 | 0 | 76 | 47 | 123 | 47 | 14 | 0.0 | 0.0 | 7.6 | 4.7 | 12.3 | 4.7 | 1.4 | 0 |
| 2019 | Hawthorn | 30 | 5 | 0 | 0 | 34 | 22 | 56 | 20 | 6 | 0.0 | 0.0 | 6.8 | 4.4 | 11.2 | 4.0 | 1.2 | 0 |
| 2020 (Note: The 2020 season was played with 17 home-and-away matches per team (down from 22) and 16-minute quarters with time on (down from 20-minute quarters with time on) due to the impact of the COVID-19 pandemic.) | Sydney | 2 | 2 | 0 | 0 | 10 | 8 | 18 | 7 | 3 | 0.0 | 0.0 | 5.0 | 4.0 | 9.0 | 3.5 | 1.5 | 0 |
| 2021 | Sydney | 2 | 3 | 0 | 0 | 22 | 16 | 38 | 19 | 6 | 0.0 | 0.0 | 7.3 | 5.3 | 12.7 | 6.3 | 2.0 | 0 |
| Career | | | 48 | 0 | 0 | 389 | 260 | 649 | 235 | 62 | 0.0 | 0.0 | 8.1 | 5.4 | 13.5 | 4.9 | 1.3 | 0 |

== Honours and achievements ==
Team

- VFL premiership player (Box Hill): 2018

Individual

- Hawthorn best first year player (debut season): 2016
- SANFL State Representative: 2022
- West Adelaide Football Club Captain: 2023
