= David Hale (footballer) =

Australian rules footballer

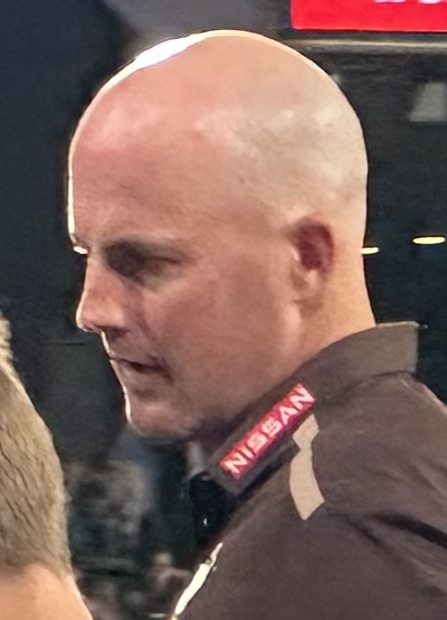
- Hale with Hawthorn in 2025

Personal information
- Full name: David Hale
- Born: 22 May 1984 (age 42); Hobart, Tasmania
- Original team: Broadbeach Football Club (QLD)
- Draft: No. 7, 2001 national draft
- Debut: Round 5, 2003, North Melbourne vs. Carlton, at Telstra Dome
- Height: 201 cm (6 ft 7 in)
- Weight: 104 kg (229 lb)
- Position: Forward/Ruck

Club information
- Current club: Hawthorn (assistant coach)

Playing career^{1}
Years	Club	Games (Goals)
2003–2010	Kangaroos/North Melbourne	129 (119)
2011–2015	Hawthorn	108 (98)
Total		237 (217)

Coaching career^{3}
Years	Club	Games (W–L–D)
2019	Fremantle	1 (0–1–0)
- ^{1} Playing statistics correct to the end of 2015.^{3} Coaching statistics correct as of 2019.

Career highlights
- 3× AFL premiership player: 2013–2015; North Melbourne Leading Goalkicker: 2008

David Hale (born 22 May 1984) is an Australian rules football coach and former player who is currently serving as an assistant coach with the Hawthorn Football Club in the Australian Football League. As a player, he played with the North Melbourne Football Club and Hawthorn Football Club in the Australian Football League.

== Early life ==
Hale was born in Hobart, Tasmania but moved to the Gold Coast, Queensland with his parents prior to his first birthday. He grew up in the Coolangatta area of the Gold Coast and attended Marymount College during his schooling years. In 2000, he began playing with the Coolangatta Tweed Heads Australian Football Club in Division 2 of the state league where he was selected in the AIS/AFL Academy squad . In 2001, he switched to Broadbeach and represented Queensland at the under 18 national championships.

== AFL career ==
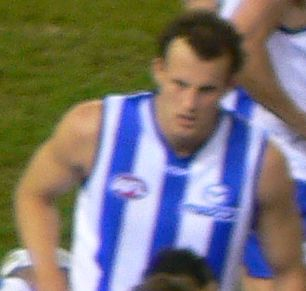
Hale playing for the Kangaroos during the 2007 AFL season

Hale was recruited from the Broadbeach Football Club. He represented the Queensland Scorpions at U16 and U18 state championship levels before being taken at pick 7 in the 2001 AFL draft by the Kangaroos Football Club.

Hale spent the 2002 season playing for the Murray Kangaroos in the VFL before making his AFL debut for North Melbourne in Round 5, 2003.

In 2008 Hale lead the goalkicking for North Melbourne with 37 goals, including a career-best 8 goals against Geelong in Round 21; a performance that earned him 3 votes in the Brownlow Medal. Hale then seemed to fall out of favour with the coaching staff playing only 16 games in 2009 and 12 in 2010.

On 8 October 2010, David Hale was traded to Hawthorn in exchange for a 1st round draft pick.

His first season at the Hawks Hale played a predominantly forward role, providing a tall marking target, then he would provide relief to Max Bailey in the ruck. In 2012 with Bailey injured, Hale took the number one ruck mantle, rotating duties with forward partner, Jarryd Roughead. Hale enjoyed more time on the ball and used his mobility to have an impact around the ground. Bailey returned in 2013 so Hale again was 2nd mantle in rucking until Bailey would get subbed off and then he took the lead rucking spot.

Hale played in all three of Hawthorn's victorious Grand Finals from 2013 to 2015. Hale was substituted off for Matt Suckling late in the 3rd quarter of the 2015 AFL Grand Final; with abolition of the substitute rule at the end of the 2015 AFL season, this meant that Hale became the last player to be substituted out of the game. He announced his retirement on 6 October 2015.

== Coaching ==
=== Fremantle Football Club ===
On 23 October 2015, it was announced that he had joined Fremantle Football Club as an assistant coach under senior coach Ross Lyon alongside former premiership teammate Brent Guerra for the 2016 season. In the 2019 season, Hale coached Fremantle as caretaker senior coach for one game in the final round of the season, which was their loss to Port Adelaide, in Round 23, 2019, after senior coach Ross Lyon was sacked the previous week. Hale was not retained as Fremantle Football Club senior coach at the end of the 2019 season and was replaced by Justin Longmuir, but Hale however remained at Fremantle Football Club as an assistant coach. At the end of the 2021 season, Hale would depart Fremantle Football Club to return to Hawthorn as an assistant.

=== Hawthorn Football Club ===
At the end of the 2021 season, Hale returned to Hawthorn Football Club as an assistant coach under senior coach Sam Mitchell.

== Statistics ==
Legend
G	Goals	K	Kicks	D	Disposals	T	Tackles
B	Behinds	H	Handballs	M	Marks	H/O	Hit-outs

Season	Team	No.	Games	Totals								Averages (per game)								Votes
Season	Team	No.	Games	G	B	K	H	D	M	T	H/O	G	B	K	H	D	M	T	H/O	Votes
2003	Kangaroos	31	3	0	0	5	3	8	4	1	8	0.0	0.0	1.7	1.0	2.7	1.3	0.3	2.7	0
2004	Kangaroos	31	11	4	2	47	27	74	37	10	62	0.4	0.2	4.3	2.5	6.7	3.4	0.9	5.6	0
2005	Kangaroos	31	23	14	2	132	76	208	86	46	224	0.6	0.1	5.7	3.3	9.0	3.7	2.0	9.7	0
2006	Kangaroos	31	22	11	12	166	84	250	120	42	243	0.5	0.5	7.5	3.8	11.4	5.5	1.9	11.0	0
2007	Kangaroos	31	20	14	11	122	99	221	88	39	166	0.7	0.6	6.1	5.0	11.1	4.4	2.0	8.3	0
2008	North Melbourne	31	22	37	19	156	94	250	130	38	187	1.7	0.9	7.1	4.3	11.4	5.9	1.7	8.5	8
2009	North Melbourne	31	16	22	13	94	45	139	79	21	54	1.4	0.8	5.9	2.8	8.7	4.9	1.3	3.4	4
2010	North Melbourne	31	12	17	8	58	34	92	34	17	38	1.4	0.7	4.8	2.8	7.7	2.8	1.4	3.2	0
2011	Hawthorn	20	20	19	15	115	125	240	98	41	273	1.0	0.8	5.8	6.3	12.0	4.9	2.1	13.7	1
2012	Hawthorn	20	24	24	18	139	192	331	94	54	547	1.0	0.8	5.8	8.0	13.8	3.9	2.3	22.8	3
2013^{#}	Hawthorn	20	24	20	26	139	174	313	98	60	405	0.8	1.1	5.8	7.3	13.0	4.1	2.5	16.9	0
2014^{#}	Hawthorn	20	22	22	11	101	123	224	77	55	360	1.0	0.5	4.6	5.6	10.2	3.5	2.5	16.4	0
2015^{#}	Hawthorn	20	18	13	5	66	97	163	41	43	285	0.7	0.3	3.7	5.4	9.1	2.3	2.4	15.8	0
Career			237	217	142	1340	1173	2513	986	467	2852	0.9	0.6	5.7	4.9	10.6	4.2	2.0	12.0	16

== Honours and achievements ==
Team

- 3× AFL premiership player (Hawthorn): 2013, 2014, 2015
- 2× Minor premiership (Hawthorn): 2012, 2013
- Minor premiership (Box Hill): 2015

Individual

- North Melbourne Leading Goalkicker: 2008
- Under 18 All-Australian team: 2001
