= Matt Suckling =

Australian rules footballer

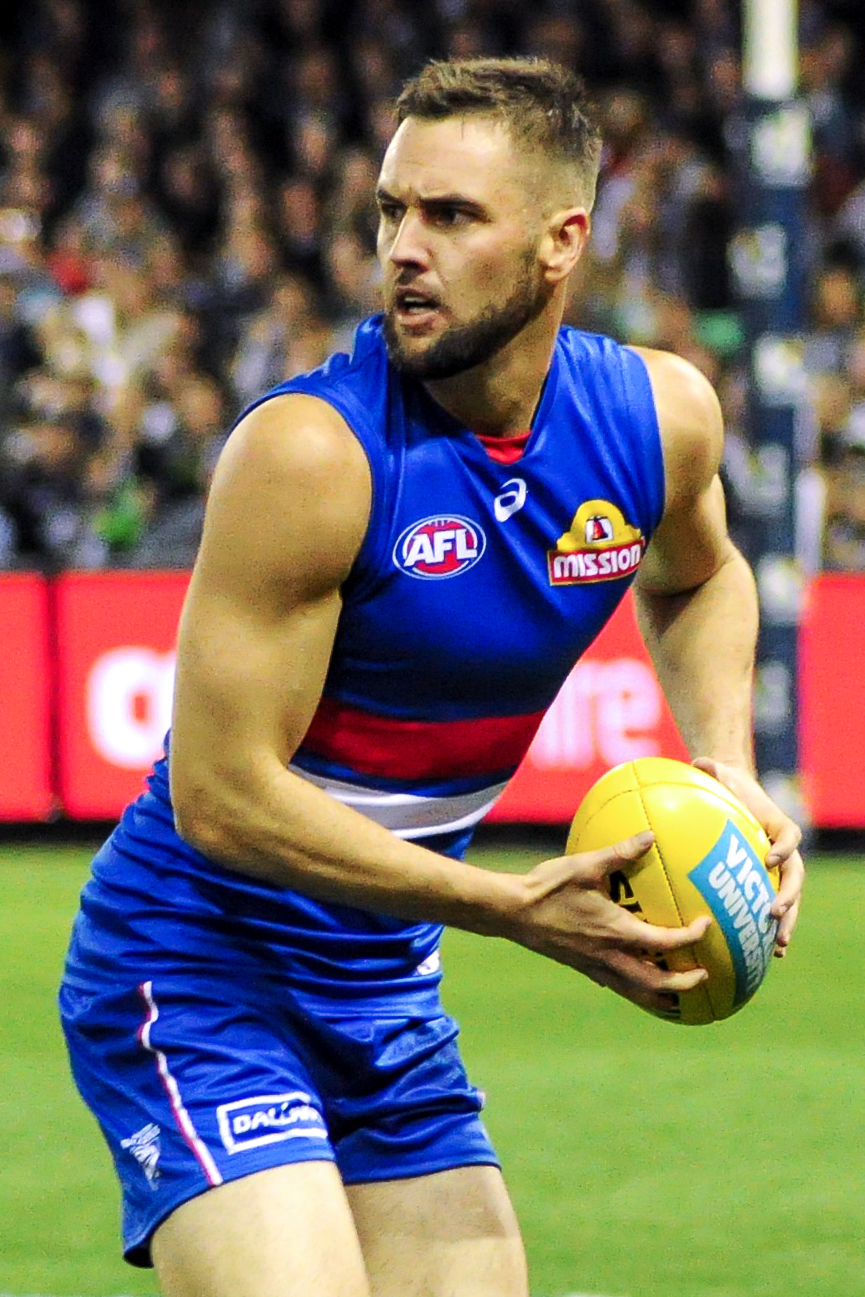
- Suckling playing for the Western Bulldogs in April 2018

Personal information
- Born: 25 July 1988 (age 38); Wagga Wagga, New South Wales
- Original teams: East Wagga-Kooringal (Riverina Football League); Wagga Tigers (AFL Canberra)
- Draft: No. 22, 2007 rookie draft
- Debut: Round 1, 2009, Hawthorn vs. Geelong, at Melbourne Cricket Ground
- Height: 186 cm (6 ft 1 in)
- Weight: 82 kg (181 lb)
- Position: Defender

Playing career^{1}
| Years | Club | Games (Goals) |
| 2007–2015 | Hawthorn | 102 (51) |
| 2016–2020 | Western Bulldogs | 76 (34) |
| Total | | 178 (85) |

International team honours^{2}
| Years | Team | Games (Goals) |
| 2011 | Australia | 2 (0) |
- ^{1} Playing statistics correct to the end of 2020.^{2} Representative statistics correct as of 2011.

Career highlights
- 2× AFL premiership player: 2014, 2015

Matthew Suckling (born 25 July 1988) is a former Australian rules footballer who played for the Hawthorn Football Club and Western Bulldogs in the Australian Football League (AFL). Suckling is known as a player with precision kicking and link-up play from defence. Characteristic of his style of play is his very long range, very accurate kicking.

== Early life ==
Hailing from Wagga Wagga, Suckling played football with Isaac Smith in the Wagga Hawks for several years before both moved to the Wagga Tigers where they won two premierships.

== Rookie ==
First drafted by the Hawthorn Football Club at pick 22 in the 2007 Rookie draft. He was struck down by osteitis pubis for most of 2007 but was retained on the rookie list for 2008. Suckling was redrafted to Hawthorn's rookie list by the club at pick 81 in the 2009 Rookie draft.

At the 2009 rookie draft, where Hawthorn had agreed to redraft Suckling; the club mistakenly read out the wrong player registration number and accidentally selected the Sandringham Dragons' best-and-fairest player, Matthew Suckling

He was then finally drafted to Hawthorn's senior list with pick 70 in the 2009 AFL draft.

== Career ==
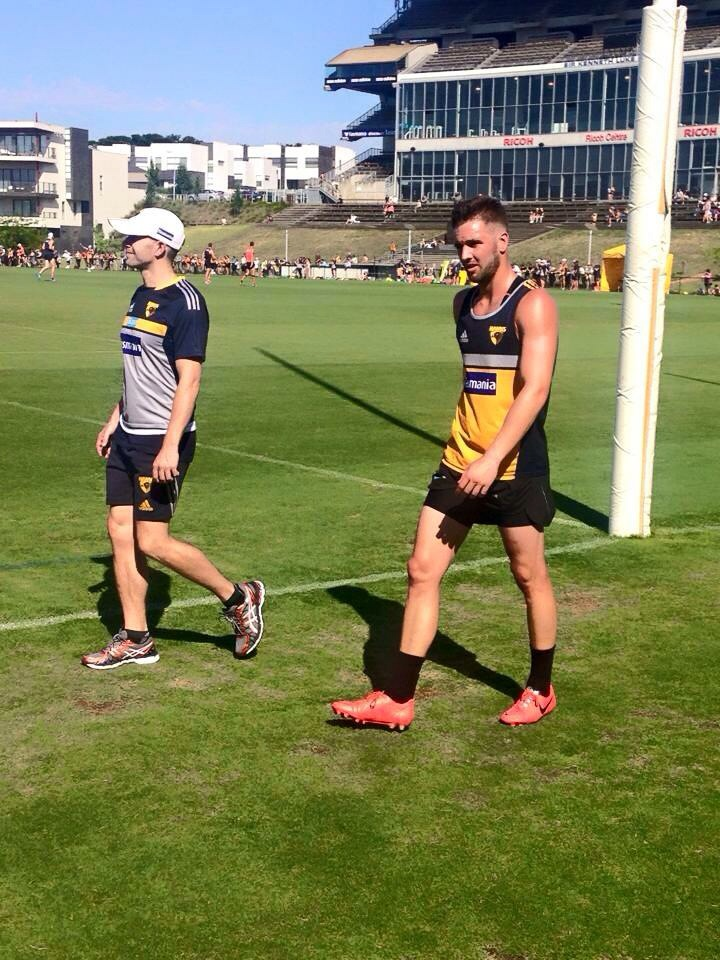
Suckling at training in January 2015

He made his debut for Hawthorn in the opening round of the 2009 AFL season in the rematch of the 2008 AFL Grand Final against Geelong. The 20-year-old defender was one of three Hawks playing their first game in the MCG blockbuster. Omitted the next week because of injury, Suckling was unable to break back into the side; he was listed as an emergency later in the year. In 2010 he played five games, and was on the verge of selection for most of the season.

2011 was a breakthrough year for Suckling; with his precision kicking and link-up play he became a key to Hawthorn's defence. Characteristic of his style of play is his long range, accurate kicking.

Suckling was selected as the Australia international rules football team's goalkeeper for the 2011 International Rules Series in Australia. Australia lost the series 2–0, with a 130–65 aggregate score. Suckling was one of two Hawthorn players selected for the team, along with Liam Shiels.

Suckling was one of three Hawthorn players to play every game in 2012.

During the 2013 NAB Cup pre season competition Suckling tore his anterior cruciate ligament whilst playing against Richmond. Suckling missed the entire 2013 season due to the injury that required a full knee reconstruction.

Suckling returned to the side in 2014, and would go on to claim his elusive premiership medal in the club's 2014 Grand Final win. He followed this up with a premiership win in 2015, starting the game as a substitute and coming on late in the third quarter for David Hale; with the abolition of the substitute rule at the end of the 2015 AFL season, this meant that Suckling became the last player to be substituted into a game under the original AFL substitute rules.

Following the Grand Final, Suckling exercised his right as a free agent and joined the Western Bulldogs. In his first season at the Western Bulldogs Suckling was unfortunate to miss the Preliminary Final and Grand Final victories with an Achilles injury. Suckling became a regular in the Bulldogs' backline but in 2018 after playing 11 games he suffered an achilles injury ultimately ended his season. He returned to form in 2019 playing 19 games but only managed 7 games in his final season.

Suckling was delisted by the Western Bulldogs at the conclusion of the 2020 AFL season, after 76 games for the club over his five years at the club.

Suckling retired at the conclusion of the 2020 season.

== Statistics ==
Legend
| G | Goals | K | Kicks | D | Disposals | T | Tackles |
| B | Behinds | H | Handballs | M | Marks |

| Season | Team | No. | Games | Totals | | | | | | | Averages (per game) | | | | | | | Votes |
| Season | Team | No. | Games | G | B | K | H | D | M | T | G | B | K | H | D | M | T | Votes |
|---|---|---|---|---|---|---|---|---|---|---|---|---|---|---|---|---|---|---|
| 2007 | Hawthorn | 42 | 0 | — | — | — | — | — | — | — | — | — | — | — | — | — | — | — |
| 2008 | Hawthorn | 42 | 0 | — | — | — | — | — | — | — | — | — | — | — | — | — | — | — |
| 2009 | Hawthorn | 42 | 1 | 0 | 0 | 5 | 9 | 14 | 2 | 0 | 0.0 | 0.0 | 5.0 | 9.0 | 14.0 | 2.0 | 0.0 | 0 |
| 2010 | Hawthorn | 31 | 5 | 0 | 1 | 42 | 31 | 73 | 16 | 6 | 0.0 | 0.2 | 8.4 | 6.2 | 14.6 | 3.2 | 1.2 | 0 |
| 2011 | Hawthorn | 31 | 23 | 8 | 11 | 351 | 140 | 491 | 138 | 45 | 0.3 | 0.5 | 15.3 | 6.1 | 21.3 | 6.0 | 2.0 | 4 |
| 2012 | Hawthorn | 4 | 25 | 16 | 11 | 333 | 166 | 499 | 140 | 40 | 0.6 | 0.4 | 13.3 | 6.6 | 20.0 | 5.6 | 1.6 | 5 |
| 2013 | Hawthorn | 4 | 0 | — | — | — | — | — | — | — | — | — | — | — | — | — | — | — |
| 2014^{#} | Hawthorn | 4 | 23 | 12 | 8 | 306 | 173 | 479 | 113 | 32 | 0.5 | 0.3 | 13.3 | 7.5 | 20.8 | 4.9 | 1.4 | 1 |
| 2015^{#} | Hawthorn | 4 | 25 | 15 | 15 | 323 | 160 | 483 | 143 | 43 | 0.6 | 0.6 | 12.9 | 6.4 | 19.3 | 5.7 | 1.7 | 0 |
| 2016 | Western Bulldogs | 1 | 17 | 7 | 9 | 218 | 128 | 346 | 79 | 30 | 0.4 | 0.5 | 12.8 | 7.5 | 20.4 | 4.6 | 1.8 | 0 |
| 2017 | Western Bulldogs | 1 | 22 | 9 | 15 | 297 | 160 | 457 | 106 | 41 | 0.4 | 0.7 | 13.5 | 7.3 | 20.8 | 4.8 | 1.9 | 0 |
| 2018 | Western Bulldogs | 1 | 11 | 5 | 9 | 160 | 109 | 269 | 61 | 15 | 0.5 | 0.8 | 14.5 | 9.9 | 24.5 | 5.5 | 1.4 | 2 |
| 2019 | Western Bulldogs | 1 | 19 | 10 | 11 | 296 | 101 | 397 | 104 | 38 | 0.5 | 0.6 | 15.6 | 5.3 | 20.9 | 5.5 | 2.0 | 0 |
| 2020 (Note: The 2020 season was played with 17 home-and-away matches per team (down from 22) and 16-minute quarters with time on (down from 20-minute quarters with time on) due to the impact of the COVID-19 pandemic.) | Western Bulldogs | 1 | 7 | 3 | 0 | 48 | 22 | 70 | 26 | 2 | 0.4 | 0.0 | 6.9 | 3.1 | 10.0 | 3.7 | 0.3 | 0 |
| Career | | | 178 | 85 | 90 | 2379 | 1199 | 3578 | 928 | 292 | 0.5 | 0.5 | 13.4 | 6.7 | 20.1 | 5.2 | 1.6 | 12 |

== Honours and achievements ==
Team

- 2× AFL premiership player (Hawthorn): 2014, 2015
- 2× Minor premiership (Hawthorn): 2012, 2013

Individual

- Australia international rules football team: 2011
