= Paul Puopolo =

Australian rules footballer (born 1987)

- Puopolo playing for Hawthorn in April 2017

Personal information
- Nickname: Poppy.
- Born: 2 December 1987 (age 38)
- Original team: Hope Valley / Norwood
- Draft: No. 66, 2010 national draft
- Debut: Round 7, 2011, Hawthorn vs. Port Adelaide, at AAMI Stadium
- Height: 173 cm (5 ft 8 in)
- Weight: 78 kg (172 lb)
- Position: Forward

Playing career^{1}
Years	Club	Games (Goals)
2011–2020	Hawthorn	196 (185)
- ^{1} Playing statistics correct to the end of 2020.

Career highlights
- 3× AFL premiership player: 2013–2015

Paul Puopolo (born 2 December 1987) is a former Australian rules footballer who played for the Hawthorn Football Club in the Australian Football League (AFL). A man small in stature, he is known to jump into packs and take marks against much taller opponents. He is a 3-time premiership player having played in Hawthorn's back-to-back-to-back Grand Final triumphs in 2013, 2014 and 2015.

== Norwood ==
Puopolo made his debut for Norwood in 2007 and started out as a small forward/midfielder. Puopolo, who hails from Hope Valley, South Australia quickly built a reputation as the South Australian National Football League's best lockdown small defender. He was converted into a defender by former Norwood coach Trevor Hill in 2008. Despite his lack of height, he has always had the strength and speed to counter his rivals. In 2008 he was a SANFL Coca-Cola Star Search Award Nominee. By the time he got drafted by Hawthorn at the end of 2010 he had played 68 senior games and kicked 13 goals for the Redlegs.

== Hawthorn (2011–2020) ==
Puopolo made his debut for the Hawks in round 7 of the 2011 AFL season against Port Adelaide. At his debut he was the AFL's tenth shortest player, standing at 173 cm. In his debut game, Puopolo had a reasonable performance, having nine kicks, six handballs and laying two tackles.

After making his debut in round 7, Puopolo went on to play Hawthorn's remaining 19 games of the 2011 season, including three finals. His goal late in the round 24 final quarter against Gold Coast sealed the match, along with his tackle soon after which thwarted a forward 50 entry - the win secured Hawthorn a top 4 ladder position for the finals ahead. Puopolo kicked 3 goals in the Semi-Final against Sydney, and 1 goal against Collingwood in the Preliminary Final. He finished his debut season with 20 games and 8 goals, gaining much experience in a brilliant first season. He was awarded Hawthorn's Best First Year Player Award.

In the 2012 season, Puopolo played in 21 out of 25 games and kicked 24 goals. He played in Hawthorn's loss to Sydney in the 2012 AFL Grand Final.

In the 2013 season Puopolo played in 22 out of 25 games and kicked 15 goals. Puopolo achieved his first premiership during that season when Hawthorn defeated Fremantle in the 2013 AFL Grand Final.

In the 2014 season, Puopolo was the recipient of his second premiership, as Hawthorn triumphed over the Sydney Swans in the Grand Final.

Puopolo had what was widely regarded as a good year in 2015, kicking 29 goals and picking up his third premiership as Hawthorn defeated the West Coast Eagles in the Grand Final. He played his 100th game during the 2015 season, in round 15 against Fremantle.

Puopolo had another good season in 2016, kicking a career high 34 goals. At the end of year he re-signed for an extra year with Hawthorn, ensuring he would remain at the club until at least 2018.

In the middle of the 2017 season, Puopolo suffered a groin injury that limited him to 15 games for the year. Despite this, he was considered to have put in good performances in the games he did play, setting a career-high tackling average. Puopolo suffered a hamstring injury early in the 2018 season that kept him out for over a month, but was still regarded as a high-quality pressure forward and was resigned for another year at the end of the season.

Puopolo managed to play all 22 games in the 2019 season, wherein his performances were marked by a shift away from goalkicking to defensive pressure, kicking a career low 10 goals but laying 99 tackles, a number generally considered impressive.

After struggling for form and falling out of the team, Puopolo announced he would retire from the AFL at the end of 2020.

== Statistics ==
Legend
G	Goals	K	Kicks	D	Disposals	T	Tackles
B	Behinds	H	Handballs	M	Marks

Season	Team	No.	Games	Totals							Averages (per game)							Votes
Season	Team	No.	Games	G	B	K	H	D	M	T	G	B	K	H	D	M	T	Votes
2011	Hawthorn	28	20	8	5	175	172	347	72	68	0.4	0.3	8.8	8.6	17.4	3.6	3.4	0
2012	Hawthorn	28	21	24	14	118	105	223	38	64	1.1	0.7	5.6	5.0	10.6	1.8	3.0	0
2013^{#}	Hawthorn	28	22	15	6	182	194	376	48	96	0.7	0.3	8.3	8.8	17.1	2.2	4.4	0
2014^{#}	Hawthorn	28	25	22	16	205	191	396	69	109	0.9	0.6	8.2	7.6	15.8	2.8	4.4	0
2015^{#}	Hawthorn	28	23	29	12	151	155	306	47	114	1.3	0.5	6.6	6.7	13.3	2.0	5.0	0
2016	Hawthorn	28	22	34	15	154	155	309	48	100	1.6	0.7	7.0	7.1	14.1	2.2	4.6	3
2017	Hawthorn	28	15	19	4	97	92	189	27	87	1.3	0.3	6.5	6.1	12.6	1.8	5.8	0
2018	Hawthorn	28	20	20	6	130	118	248	42	84	1.0	0.3	6.5	5.9	12.4	2.1	4.2	1
2019	Hawthorn	28	22	10	10	116	148	264	41	99	0.5	0.5	5.3	6.7	12.0	1.9	4.5	0
2020 (Note: The 2020 season was played with 17 home-and-away matches per team (down from 22) and 16-minute quarters with time on (down from 20-minute quarters with time on) due to the impact of the COVID-19 pandemic.)	Hawthorn	28	6	4	1	27	27	54	7	15	0.7	0.2	4.5	4.5	9.0	1.2	2.5	0
Career			196	185	89	1355	1357	2712	439	836	0.9	0.5	6.9	6.9	13.8	2.2	4.3	4

== Honours and achievements ==
Team

- 3× AFL premiership player (Hawthorn): 2013, 2014, 2015
- 2× Minor premiership (Hawthorn): 2012, 2013

Individual

- Hawthorn best clubman: 2020
- Hawthorn best first year player (debut season): 2011
- Hawthorn life member
