= 2013 AFL finals series =

Finals matches of the 2013 AFL tournament

2013 premiership season
- Date: 6–28 September 2013
- Teams: 8
- Premiers: Hawthorn (11th premiership)
- Runners-up: Fremantle (1st grand final)
- Minor premiers: Hawthorn (9th minor premiership)

Attendance
- Matches played: 9
- Total attendance: 558,391 (62,043 per match)
- Highest: 100,007 (Grand Final, Hawthorn vs. Fremantle)

The 2013 Australian Football League finals series determined the winner of the 2013 AFL season. The series ran from the 6th to 28 September and culminated in the 117th AFL/VFL Grand Final, held between Fremantle and Hawthorn, which Hawthorn won.

The top eight teams from the home and away season qualified for the finals series. The top four teams (Hawthorn, Geelong, Fremantle and Sydney) all made the preliminary finals. Both Carlton and Port Adelaide made the semi-finals, while Collingwood and Richmond lost their respective elimination finals.

AFL final series have been played under the current format since 2000. The higher a team finishes on the ladder, the more advantages they get. First and second get a "double chance" and a home final. Third and fourth also get a "double chance" but have to play away. Fifth to eighth play elimination finals where the loser's season is over. Fifth and sixth play their elimination finals at home.

Essendon originally finished seventh but were disqualified due to an Australian Sports Anti-Doping Authority (ASADA) investigation into their possible use of un-approved supplements during the 2012 season. This promoted Carlton to eighth and Port Adelaide to seventh.

2013 saw the first time Kardinia Park had hosted a final and only the second time a final had been hosted in Geelong, the previous occurrence being in 1897 at Corio Oval.

== Qualification ==
2013 AFL ladder
Pos	Team	Pld	W	L	D	PF	PA	PP	Pts	
1	Hawthorn (P)	22	19	3	0	2523	1859	135.7	76	Finals series
2	Geelong	22	18	4	0	2409	1776	135.6	72	Finals series
3	Fremantle	22	16	5	1	2035	1518	134.1	66	Finals series
4	Sydney	22	15	6	1	2244	1694	132.5	62	Finals series
5	Richmond	22	15	7	0	2154	1754	122.8	60	Finals series
6	Collingwood	22	14	8	0	2148	1868	115.0	56	Finals series
7	Port Adelaide	22	12	10	0	2051	2002	102.4	48	Finals series
8	Carlton	22	11	11	0	2125	1992	106.7	44	Finals series
9	Essendon	22	14	8	0	2145	2000	107.3	56 (Note: Essendon was relegated to ninth due to irregularities in its supplements program during the 2012 season.)	
10	North Melbourne	22	10	12	0	2307	1930	119.5	40	
11	Adelaide	22	10	12	0	2064	1909	108.1	40	
12	Brisbane Lions	22	10	12	0	1922	2144	89.6	40	
13	West Coast	22	9	13	0	2038	2139	95.3	36	
14	Gold Coast	22	8	14	0	1918	2091	91.7	32	
15	Western Bulldogs	22	8	14	0	1926	2262	85.1	32	
16	St Kilda	22	5	17	0	1751	2120	82.6	20	
17	Melbourne	22	2	20	0	1455	2691	54.1	8	
18	Greater Western Sydney	22	1	21	0	1524	2990	51.0	4	

Source: AFL Tables
Rules for classification: 1) points; 2) percentage; 3) number of points for.
(P) Premiers

== Venues ==
Melbourne	2013 AFL finals series is located in Australia	Sydney
Melbourne Cricket Ground	2013 AFL finals series is located in Australia	ANZ Stadium
Capacity: 100,024	2013 AFL finals series is located in Australia	Capacity: 82,500
Geelong	2013 AFL finals series is located in Australia	Perth
Simonds Stadium	2013 AFL finals series is located in Australia	Patersons Stadium
Capacity: 33,500	2013 AFL finals series is located in Australia	Capacity: 43,500

== Summary of results ==
Qualifying and elimination finals
6 September, MCG
1	Hawthorn	15.15 (105)
4	Sydney	7.9 (51)
8 September, MCG
5	Richmond	14.12 (96)
8	Carlton	18.8 (116)
7 September, MCG
6	Collingwood	9.9 (63)
7	Port Adelaide	12.15 (87)
7 September, Simonds Stadium
2	Geelong	9.18 (72)
3	Fremantle	12.15 (87)

Semi-finals
14 September, ANZ Stadium
Sydney	13.8 (86)
Carlton	8.14 (62)
13 September, MCG
Geelong	13.18 (96)
Port Adelaide	12.8 (80)

Preliminary finals
20 September, MCG
Hawthorn	14.18 (102)
Geelong	15.7 (97)
21 September, Patersons Stadium
Fremantle	14.15 (99)
Sydney	11.8 (74)

Grand final
28 September, MCG
Hawthorn	11.11 (77)
Fremantle	8.14 (62)

== Round one (qualifying & elimination finals) ==
=== First qualifying final (Hawthorn vs. Sydney) ===
First qualifying final
Friday, 6 September (7:50 pm)	Hawthorn	def.	Sydney	MCG (crowd: 59,615)	Report
3.4 (22); 4.7 (31); 9.9 (63); 15.15 (105)	Q1; Q2; Q3; Final	3.3 (21); 4.7 (31); 5.8 (38); 7.9 (51)	Television broadcast: Seven Network, Fox Footy (simulcast)
3: Gunston; 2: Roughead, Hale; 1: Lake, Shiels, Anderson, Hill, Puopolo, Spangher, Breust, Bailey	Goals	2: Tippett; 1: White, Jetta, Rohan, O'Keefe, Pyke
Sewell, Mitchell, Gibson, Guerra	Best	Jack, Kennedy, Bird, Parker

=== Second qualifying final (Geelong vs. Fremantle) ===
Second qualifying final
Saturday, 7 September (2:20 pm)	Geelong	def. by	Fremantle	Simonds Stadium (crowd: 32,815)	Report
4.6 (30); 6.11 (47); 9.13 (67); 9.18 (72)	Q1; Q2; Q3; Final	2.5 (17); 7.9 (51); 10.12 (72); 12.15 (87)	Television broadcast: Seven Network, Fox Footy (simulcast)
3: Podsiadly; 2: Johnson; 1: Corey, Vardy, Motlop, Duncan	Goals	3: Barlow; 2: Pavlich, Hill; 1: Walters, Ballantyne, Spurr, Sandilands, Mayne
Mackie, Bartel, Corey, Guthrie, Taylor	Best	Barlow, Fyfe, Spurr, Mundy, Pearce, Crowley

=== Second elimination final (Collingwood vs. Port Adelaide) ===
Second elimination final
Saturday, 7 September (7:45 pm)	Collingwood	def. by	Port Adelaide	MCG (crowd: 51,722)	Report
1.4 (10); 4.6 (30); 7.7 (49); 9.9 (63)	Q1; Q2; Q3; Final	2.4 (16); 6.6 (42); 8.9 (57); 12.15 (87)	Television broadcast: Seven Network, Fox Footy (simulcast)
3: Swan; 2: Cloke; 1: Keeffe, Macaffer, Williams, Beams	Goals	3: Wingard, Schulz; 2: Boak, Wines; 1: Westhoff, Monfries
Swan, Beams, Macaffer, Sidebottom	Best	Logan, Ebert, Cornes, Jonas, Lobbe, Carlile

=== First elimination final (Richmond vs. Carlton) ===
First elimination final
Sunday, 8 September (3:20 pm)	Richmond	def. by	Carlton	MCG (crowd: 94,690)	Report
3.5 (23); 10.7 (67); 12.10 (82); 14.12 (96)	Q1; Q2; Q3; Final	2.3 (15); 6.5 (41); 12.6 (78); 18.8 (116)	Television broadcast: Seven Network, Fox Footy (simulcast)
2: Vickery, Cotchin, Edwards, Maric; 1: Riewoldt, Petterd, Newman, Martin, Tuck, Ellis	Goals	4: Waite, Duigan; 3: Betts; 2: Garlett, Robinson; 1: Warnock, Scotland, Judd
Deledio, Cotchin, Martin, Rance, Newman	Best	Judd, Murphy, Curnow, Duigan, Betts, Waite, Gibbs

== Round two (semi-finals) ==
=== First semi-final (Sydney vs. Carlton) ===
First semi-final
Saturday, 14 September (7:45 pm)	Sydney	def.	Carlton	ANZ Stadium (crowd: 37,980)	Report
3.3 (21); 8.6 (54); 13.8 (86); 13.8 (86)	Q1; Q2; Q3; Final	2.3 (15); 4.8 (32); 4.8 (32); 8.14 (62)	Television broadcast: Seven Network, Fox Footy (simulcast)
3: Parker; 2: McVeigh, Jack, Cunningham; 1: O'Keefe, Kennedy, Jetta, Bolton	Goals	3: Waite; 2: Betts; 1: Armfield, Gibbs, Robinson
McVeigh, Parker, Jack, Hannebery, Grundy, Cunningham	Best	Walker, Murphy, Simpson, Henderson, McLean
Carlton's scoreless 3rd quarter marked the first time since 1959 that they went scoreless in a finals quarter.

=== Second semi-final (Geelong vs. Port Adelaide) ===
Second semi-final
Friday, 13 September (7:50 pm)	Geelong	def.	Port Adelaide	MCG (crowd: 52,744)	Report
2.2 (14); 3.6 (24); 8.12 (60); 13.18 (96)	Q1; Q2; Q3; Final	3.2 (20); 7.5 (47); 8.5 (53); 12.8 (80)	Television broadcast: Seven Network, Fox Footy (simulcast)
4: Chapman; 2: Hawkins, Motlop; 1: Duncan, Bartel, Corey, Christensen, Selwood	Goals	3: Westhoff; 2: Schulz; 1: Ebert, Monfries, Lobbe, Logan, Gray, Broadbent, Hartlett
Chapman, Johnson, Corey, Selwood, Motlop, Kelly	Best	Cornes, Moore, Westhoff, Boak, Monfries

== Round three (preliminary finals) ==
=== First preliminary final (Hawthorn vs. Geelong) ===
First preliminary final
Friday, 20 September (7:50 pm)	Hawthorn	def.	Geelong	MCG (crowd: 85,569)	Report
3.5 (23); 7.8 (50); 10.10 (70); 14.18 (102)	Q1; Q2; Q3; Final	4.0 (24); 7.4 (46); 14.6 (90); 15.7 (97)	Television broadcast: Seven Network, Fox Footy (simulcast)
4: Gunston; 3: Burgoyne; 2: Hale, Hill; 1: Guerra, Breust, Franklin	Goals	4: Johnson; 2: Motlop; 1: Christensen, Hawkins, Vardy, Bartel, Selwood, Guthrie, Taylor, Murdoch, Caddy
Mitchell, Burgoyne, Gunston, Hale, Birchall, Guerra, Hill	Best	Johnson, Motlop, Guthrie, Selwood, Taylor, Stokes, Duncan
Hawthorn's victory was its first over Geelong in 11 games since the 2008 Grand Final, ending the "Kennett curse".

=== Second preliminary final (Fremantle vs. Sydney) ===
Second preliminary final
Saturday, 21 September (5:45 pm)	Fremantle	def.	Sydney	Patersons Stadium (crowd: 43,249)	Report
2.9 (21); 7.11 (53); 11.12 (78); 14.15 (99)	Q1; Q2; Q3; Final	2.1 (13); 2.2 (14); 5.5 (35); 11.8 (74)	Television broadcast: Seven Network, Fox Footy (simulcast)
3: Walters; 2: Pavlich, Fyfe, Suban; 1: Crowley, Duffield, Neale, Barlow, Ballantyne	Goals	2: Rohan; 1: Jetta, Cunningham, Parker, Bolton, McGlynn, Pyke, McVeigh, Hannebery
Mundy, Fyfe, Crowley, Walters, Duffield, Mzungu	Best	McVeigh, Kennedy, Parker, Malceski, McGlynn, Mumford
Sydney's half-time score of 2.2 (14) was its lowest ever in a finals match.

== Round four (Grand Final) ==
Grand Final
Saturday, 28 September (2:30 pm)	Hawthorn	def.	Fremantle	MCG (crowd: 100,007)	Report
2.3 (15); 5.5 (35); 8.8 (56); 11.11 (77)	Q1; Q2; Q3; Final	0.3 (3); 1.6 (12); 6.10 (46); 8.14 (62)	Umpires: Brett Rosebury, Mathew Nicholls, Simon Meredith; Norm Smith Medal: Brian Lake; Television broadcast: Seven Network; National anthem: Tina Arena
Gunston 4, Roughead 2, Franklin, Rioli, Smith, Breust, Hill	Goals	Pavlich 3, Walters 2, Mzungu, Mayne, Pearce
Lake, Gunston, Lewis, Rioli, Hodge, Birchall	Best	Mundy, Fyfe, Crowley, Johnson, Barlow
Nil	Injuries	Nil
Lake (striking), Rioli (rough conduct)	Reports	Suban (misconduct)

== Scheduling Issues ==
- In Round one, all finals were to be played in Melbourne, usually meaning that one match would be moved to Etihad Stadium; however, the AFL announced that the qualifying final between Geelong and Fremantle would instead be played at Simonds Stadium in Geelong, as a match between these two sides would not have attracted a full capacity crowd at Etihad Stadium. It was the first finals match in Geelong since 1897, and the first ever at Simonds Stadium.
