= 2014 AFL finals series =

Final matches of the 2014 AFL season

2014 premiership season
- Date: 5–27 September 2014
- Teams: 8
- Premiers: Hawthorn (12th premiership)
- Runners-up: Sydney (16th grand final)
- Minor premiers: Sydney (8th minor premiership)

Attendance
- Matches played: 9
- Total attendance: 570,568 (63,396 per match)
- Highest: 99,454 (Grand Final, Sydney vs. Hawthorn)

The 2014 Australian Football League finals series is the 118th annual edition of the VFL/AFL final series, the Australian rules football tournament staged to determine the winner of the 2014 AFL Premiership Season. The series ran over four weekends in September 2014, and culminated with the 2014 AFL Grand Final at the Melbourne Cricket Ground on 27 September 2014.

The top eight teams from the season qualified for the finals series. AFL final series have been played under the current format since 2000. Hawthorn won the premiership after defeating Sydney in the Grand Final. Port Adelaide and North Melbourne both reached the preliminary finals after finishing outside the top four, and top-four finishers Fremantle and Geelong were eliminated at the semi-finals stage. Richmond and Essendon lost their respective elimination finals.

== Qualification ==
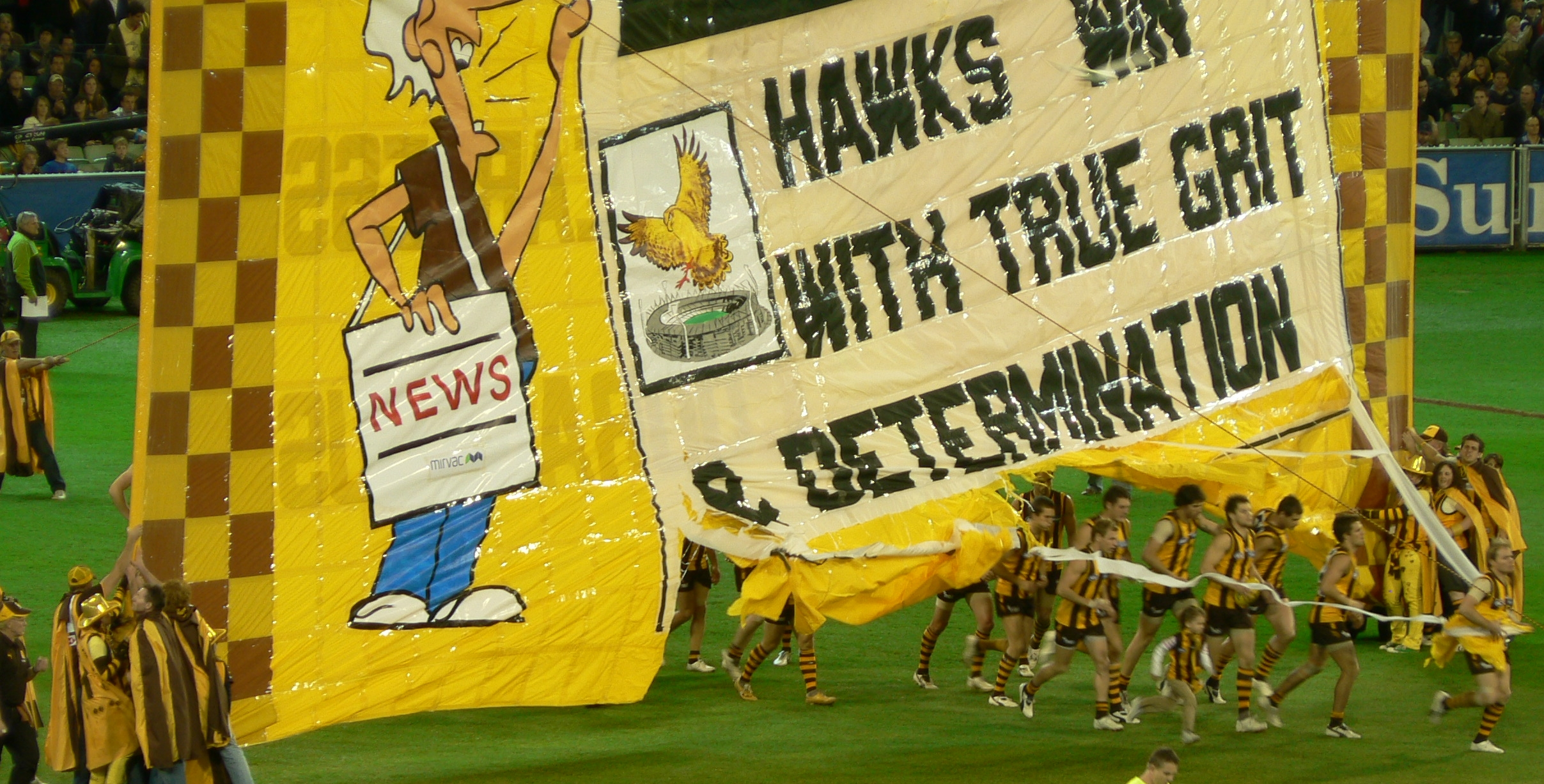
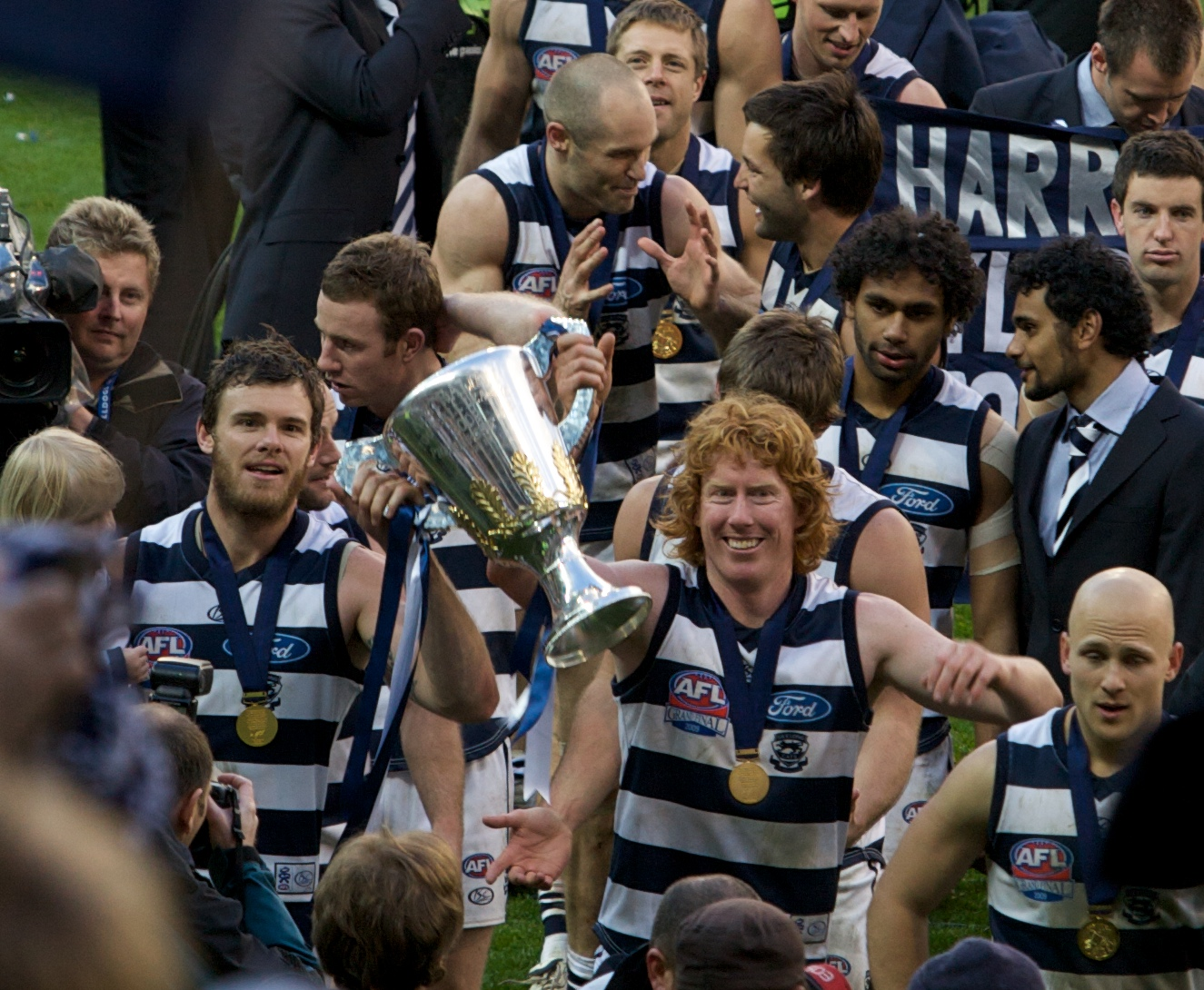
Hawthorn (left) qualified to defend their premiership title and Geelong (right) qualified for their eighth AFL finals series in a row.

Reigning premiers Hawthorn appeared in their fifth straight finals appearance, finishing second on the ladder. In the previous year's final series, Hawthorn defeated Fremantle in the Grand Final to claim their 11th premiership. Sydney also qualified for their fifth straight finals appearance after becoming minor premiers of the 2014 season. Geelong qualified third, appearing in their eighth straight finals series. Fremantle finished fourth, appearing in their third straight finals, after defeating Port Adelaide in the final round of the season. Port Adelaide were fifth on the ladder after being on top midway through the season. North Melbourne qualified as sixth for their first finals since 2012. Essendon finished seventh for their first finals appearance since 2011. Richmond qualified eighth for their second straight appearance at the finals; the club won its last nine matches of the season, recovering from a win–loss record of 3–10 to reach the finals, a feat never achieved before.

At the end of the second-last round of the 2014 season, the top seven teams had secured their qualification into the finals series; only eighth place was undecided. Richmond held eighth place by percentage from Collingwood with 44 premiership points; West Coast (tenth) and Adelaide (eleventh) had 40 points, but a superior percentage to either Richmond or Collingwood. Richmond could secure its finals place with a win, and the other teams need to win and see all clubs above them lose to qualify. Despite wins by West Coast over Gold Coast and Adelaide over St Kilda, Richmond recorded an upset win over minor premiers Sydney, securing their spot within the final eight.

2014 AFL season ladder (top 10)
#	Team	W	D	L	PF	PA	%	Pts
1	Sydney	17	0	5	2126	1488	142.9	68
2	Hawthorn	17	0	5	2458	1746	140.8	68
3	Geelong	17	0	5	2033	1787	113.8	68
4	Fremantle	16	0	6	2029	1556	130.4	64
5	Port Adelaide	14	0	8	2180	1678	129.9	56
6	North Melbourne	14	0	8	2026	1731	117	56
7	Essendon	12	1	9	1828	1719	106.3	50
8	Richmond	12	0	10	1887	1784	105.8	48
9	West Coast	11	0	11	2045	1750	116.9	44
10	Adelaide	11	0	11	2175	1907	114.1	44

== Venues ==
The matches of the 2014 AFL finals series were contested at four venues. The Melbourne Cricket Ground (MCG), the home ground of Hawthorn, hosted five of the series' nine matches, including the Grand Final. ANZ Stadium hosted both the first qualifying final and the first preliminary final of the series, which were both hosted by Sydney, who are contracted to play at ANZ for their finals games instead of their usual home ground, the Sydney Cricket Ground, until 2016. Adelaide Oval hosted the first elimination final between Port Adelaide and Richmond, its first VFL/AFL finals match. Patersons Stadium held one match during the finals series, playing host to Fremantle's semi final game against Port Adelaide.

Melbourne	2014 AFL finals series is located in Australia	Sydney
Melbourne Cricket Ground	2014 AFL finals series is located in Australia	ANZ Stadium
Capacity: 100,000	2014 AFL finals series is located in Australia	Capacity: 82,500
Adelaide	2014 AFL finals series is located in Australia	Perth
Adelaide Oval	2014 AFL finals series is located in Australia	Patersons Stadium
Capacity: 53,583	2014 AFL finals series is located in Australia	Capacity: 43,500

== Matches ==
The system used for the 2014 AFL finals series is a final eight system. The top four teams in the eight receive the "double chance" when they play in week-one qualifying finals, such that if a top-four team loses in the first week it still remains in the finals, playing a semi-final the next week against the winner of an elimination final. The bottom four of the eight play knock-out games – only the winners survive and move on to the next week. Home-state advantage goes to the team with the higher ladder position in the first two weeks, to the qualifying final winners in the third week.

In the second week, the winners of the qualifying finals receive a bye to the third week. The losers of the qualifying final plays the elimination finals winners in a semi-final. In the third week, the winners of the semi-finals from week two play the winners of the qualifying finals in the first week. The winners of those matches move on to the Grand Final at the MCG in Melbourne.

Qualifying and elimination finals
6 Sep, ANZ Stadium
1	Sydney	13.15 (93)
4	Fremantle	10.9 (69)
7 Sep, Adelaide Oval
5	Port Adelaide	20.12 (132)
8	Richmond	11.9 (75)
6 Sep, MCG
6	North Melbourne	14.9 (93)
7	Essendon	12.9 (81)
5 Sep, MCG
2	Hawthorn	15.14 (104)
3	Geelong	10.8 (68)

Semi-finals
13 Sep, Patersons Stadium
Fremantle	11.17 (83)
Port Adelaide	15.15 (105)
12 Sep, MCG
Geelong	13.14 (92)
North Melbourne	14.14 (98)

Preliminary finals
19 Sep, ANZ Stadium
Sydney	19.22 (136)
North Melbourne	9.11 (65)
20 Sep, MCG
Hawthorn	15.7 (97)
Port Adelaide	13.16 (94)

Grand final
27 Sep, MCG
Sydney	11.8 (74)
Hawthorn	21.11 (137)

=== Week one (qualifying and elimination finals) ===
==== Second qualifying final (Hawthorn vs. Geelong) ====
The opening match of the 2014 finals series featured reigning premiers and second-placed Hawthorn and third-placed Geelong. Though both teams finished level on premiership points (68 apiece), Hawthorn had a far superior percentage, 140.8%, to Geelong's 113.8%. Hawthorn was heavily favoured to account for their modern-day rivals.

Geelong scored the first two goals of the game, before the Hawks controlled general possession and momentum for much of the remaining first half. A late recovery in the second quarter saw Geelong overcome a 14-point deficit, resulting in scores being tied at 41-41 at half time. Hawthorn outran the Cats in the third quarter, with midfielder Sam Mitchell and half-back sweeper Luke Hodge winning the contested ball and setting up the four goals Hawthorn kicked in that quarter. Geelong remained in touch, kicking two goals to close the deficit to 14 points at three-quarter-time. The Hawks ran away with a comfortable win in the last term, with goals to Roughead, Gunston and Lewis seeing Hawthorn progress to a home preliminary final and a 36-point win. Despite beating Geelong in the disposal count 387-331, Hawthorn had 22 more tackles than their opponents.

Scorecard

Second qualifying final
Friday, 5 September (7.50 pm)	Hawthorn	def.	Geelong	MCG (crowd: 74,753)	Report
3.4 (22); 6.5 (41); 10.8 (68); 15.14 (104)	Q1; Q2; Q3; Final	2.1 (13); 6.5 (41); 8.6 (54); 10.8 (68)	Umpires: Mathew Nicholls, Ray Chamberlain, Troy Pannell; Television broadcast: Seven Network, Fox Footy (simulcast)
3: Gunston, Lewis; 2: Puopolo, Roughead; 1: Smith, Hale, Hodge, Breust, Langford	Goals	3: Selwood; 2: Bartel; 1: Murdoch, Walker, Hawkins, Blicavs, Johnson
Mitchell, Gunston, Hill, Smith, Lake, Birchall, Burgoyne, Puopolo	Best	Selwood, Bartel, Stokes, Varcoe, Horlin-Smith, Guthrie

==== First qualifying final (Sydney vs. Fremantle) ====
en The first qualifying final was fixtured for minor premiers the Sydney Swans. The match was only the second occasion that Fremantle and Sydney competed at ANZ Stadium, the previous meeting at the venue coming in the 2006 Preliminary Final.

The Swans welcomed back a host of premiership players from injury/rest prior to the match, with marquee players Josh Kennedy and Lance Franklin the most obvious of inclusions. Fremantle was forced to omit key defender Michael Johnson due to a back injury. Sydney maintained a slight advantage on the scoreboard for much of the afternoon, though the match was dominated by large patches of no major scores, the longest of which coming for over 20 minutes in the second quarter.

The Swans won the tackle count, disposal count, inside 50's and clearances in the third quarter, and kicked four goals to one to achieve a 22-point lead at the final break. Fremantle fought back in the final quarter, and Pavlich's fourth goal brought the deficit to less than ten points, but two goals from Sydney forward Lance Franklin from difficult angles and distances saw the Swans steady to record a 24-point win. Ben McGlynn finished the match with three goals for Sydney.

External videos
- Lance Franklin's two final quarter goals in the first qualifying final v. Fremantle

Aside from Franklin's efforts in the final quarter, the Swans were served ably by the midfield efficiency of Luke Parker (32 disposals) and Dan Hannebery (27 disposals), narrowly shading Fremantle's Nat Fyfe and Michael Barlow. Most of the key statistical indicators by the end of the game were relatively even.

Scorecard

First qualifying final
Saturday, 6 September (2:45 pm)	Sydney	def.	Fremantle	ANZ Stadium (crowd: 35,998)
3.4 (22); 5.8 (38); 9.10 (64); 13.15 (93)	Q1; Q2; Q3; Final	3.1 (19); 5.3 (33); 6.6 (42); 10.9 (69)	Umpires: Brett Rosebury, Simon Meredith, Justin Schmitt; Television broadcast: Seven Network, Fox Footy (simulcast)
3: Franklin, McGlynn; 1: Jack, Jetta, Goodes, Hannebery, Parker, Pyke, Tippett	Goals	4: Pavlich; 2: Mzungu; 1: Walters, Mundy, Sutcliffe
McGlynn, McVeigh, Hannebery, Parker, Jetta, Kennedy	Best	Pavlich, Barlow, Fyfe, Mzungu, Neale, Sandilands, Silvagni
Malceski (hamstring)	Injuries

==== Second elimination final (North Melbourne vs. Essendon) ====
The second elimination final was contested between North Melbourne and Essendon. The match took place on the night of 6 September 2014, at the Melbourne Cricket Ground.

A ferocious contest for much of the night, North Melbourne trailed by 27 points at half-time before fighting back to bring the margin to 9 points at three-quarter time. In the final few minutes of the final quarter, North Melbourne trailed by one point, before goals to the otherwise quiet key forward Drew Petrie and small forward Lindsay Thomas gave the team an eleven-point lead. From there, North Melbourne staved off repeated Essendon forward 50 entries in the last two minutes, to record a 12-point victory. North Melbourne's Ben Brown, in just his tenth AFL game, kicked four goals. The win was North Melbourne's first in a finals series since 2007, when the Kangaroos reached a preliminary final; it extended Essendon's losing streak in finals to thirteen years. The attendance of 78,559 was the highest at a North Melbourne game since the 1999 AFL Grand Final.

Scorecard

Second elimination final
Saturday, 6 September (7.15 pm)	North Melbourne	def.	Essendon	MCG (crowd: 78,559)	Report
2.3 (15); 2.4 (16); 9.5 (59); 14.9 (93)	Q1; Q2; Q3; Final	2.4 (16); 6.7 (43); 10.8 (68); 12.9 (81)	Umpires: Findlay, Donlon, Margetts; Television broadcast: Seven Network, Fox Footy (simulcast)
4: Brown; 3: Thomas; 2: Petrie; 1: Cunnington, Gibson, Dal Santo, Greenwood, Ziebell	Goals	4: Daniher; 2: Chapman, Colyer; 1: Bellchambers, Ryder, Goddard, Howlett
Wells, Brown, Greenwood, Gibson, Cunnington, Thompson	Best	Heppell, Chapman, Watson, Daniher, Colyer, Hurley
Greenwood (rough conduct)	Reports

==== First elimination final (Port Adelaide vs. Richmond) ====
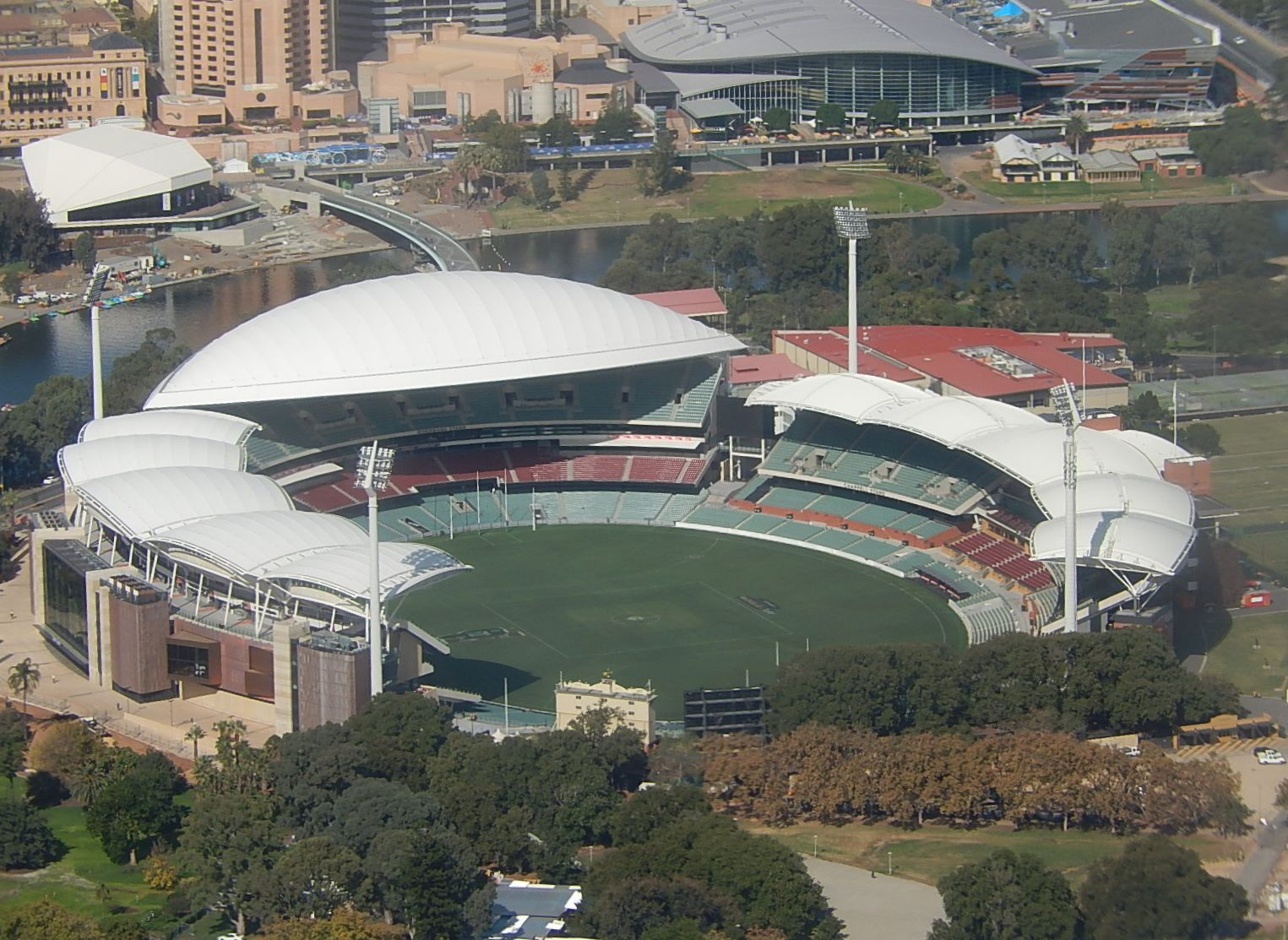
The newly renovated Adelaide Oval played host to the high-scoring final between Port Adelaide and Richmond. Port Adelaide comfortably won by a margin of 57 points.

The first elimination final of the 2014 AFL finals series was contested between Port Adelaide and Richmond. The match marked the first time an AFL finals match was held at Adelaide Oval. Both teams alternate guernseys for the match: Port Adelaide their traditional black and white 'prison bar guernsey', and Richmond their clash strip featuring extra yellow.

Port Adelaide started the match with seven unanswered goals by Justin Westhoff, Jay Schulz, Travis Boak, Matthew White, Jared Polec, Wines and Jake Neade, within the first eighteen minutes of the game. The score was 43–0 before Reece Conca scored the Tigers' only goal of the first quarter in the 21st minute. Port Adelaide was never threatened from there, and led by 69 points at half-time, and by a game-high 81 points early in the third quarter. Richmond won the final quarter, and the final margin was 57 points. The loss was Richmond's second in an elimination final in two years.

Scorecard

First elimination final
Sunday, 7 September (2:50pm)	Port Adelaide	def.	Richmond	Adelaide Oval (crowd: 50,618)	Report
8.1 (49); 14.5 (89); 19.8 (122); 20.12 (132)	Q1; Q2; Q3; Final	1.1 (7); 3.2 (20); 6.5 (41); 11.9 (75)	Umpires: Farmer, Stevic, Mitchell; Television broadcast: Seven Network, Fox Footy (simulcast)
3: Neade; 2: Ebert, Monfries, Polec, Schulz, Westhoff, Wines, Wingard; 1: Boak, Gray, White	Goals	3: Jack Riewoldt; 2: Gordon; 1: Conca, Deledio, Edwards, Griffiths, Grigg, Maric
Boak, Westhoff, Neade, Carlile, Gray, Wingard	Best	Miles, Deledio, Maric, Cotchin
White (jaw)	Injuries	Foley (nose)

=== Week two (semi-finals) ===
==== Second semi-final (Geelong vs. North Melbourne) ====
The opening match of the semi-finals stage of the finals series featured Geelong and North Melbourne. Geelong omitted Steve Johnson due to a chronic foot injury in the week. The Cats were regarded as slight favourites to progress to a seventh preliminary final in eight seasons.

Lindsay Thomas and Drew Petrie kicking four goals between them in the opening quarter as the Kangaroos' efficiency forward of centre caused concerns for the Cats. In the second quarter, Geelong failed to restrict North Melbourne's uncontested possession game-style, and key position forward Tom Hawkins was well held by his direct opponent. The Cats finished the second quarter goalless, and Nick Dal Santo led a dominant North Melbourne midfield to a 24-point lead at half time. Goals were traded for much of the third and fourth quarters, with Geelong's Joel Selwood and Josh Caddy the best of the Geelong midfield. The two teams entered the final break in an identical position to half time: a 24-point North Melbourne lead, and two early goals to Jack Ziebell stretched North Melbourne's lead to a game high 32 points at the 14 minute mark of the final quarter.

Geelong then adopted a quick game style and successfully isolated key forward Tom Hawkins forward of centre, and Hawkins kicked three goals in five minutes to narrow the margin to twelve points. With three minutes remaining, Jimmy Bartel snapped a goal from the forward pocket to reduce the margin to six points. From there, Geelong repeatedly attacked with long balls deep into their forward 50; the last such effort with 30 seconds remaining was interrupted by a game saving mark from North Melbourne ruckman Todd Goldstein, and North Melbourne held on to win by six points.

North Melbourne's Drew Petrie finished with four goals, and Todd Goldstein who dominated the ruck contests for much of the game and gave his midfielders first use on successive occasions. North Melbourne's running-handball style of play was successfully employed for much of the night, with Kangaroos beating the Cats in uncontested possessions 230–152, a number that was significantly higher than the evenly matched amount of contested possessions.

North Melbourne's six point win saw Geelong eliminated from the finals series, becoming the first team to bow out of a finals series in straight sets since West Coast in 2007.

Scorecard

Second semi-final
Friday, 12 September (7:50pm)	Geelong	def. by	North Melbourne	MCG (crowd: 65,963)	Report
5.1 (31); 5.6 (36); 8.9 (57); 13.14 (92)	Q1; Q2; Q3; Final	7.1 (43); 9.6 (60); 12.9 (81); 14.14 (98)	Umpires: Nicholls, Meredith, Pannell; Television broadcast: Seven Network, Fox Footy (simulcast)
5: Hawkins; 3: Walker; 1: Duncan, Caddy, Blicavs, Enright, Bartel	Goals	4: Petrie; 3: Thomas; 2: Ziebell; 1: Turner, Goldstein, Harvey, Black, Dal Santo
Caddy, Hawkins, Selwood, Lonergan	Best	Dal Santo, Gibson, Goldstein, Petrie, Cunnington, McDonald
Rivers (calf)	Injuries	Macmillan (hamstring)

==== First semi-final (Fremantle vs. Port Adelaide) ====
Scorecard

First semi-final
Saturday, 13 September (5:45pm)	Fremantle	def. by	Port Adelaide	Patersons Stadium (crowd: 42,338)	Report
3.5 (23); 6.11 (47); 8.13 (61); 11.17 (83)	Q1; Q2; Q3; Final	2.2 (14); 3.5 (23); 9.9 (63); 15.15 (105)	Umpires: Matt Stevic, Dean Margetts, Justin Schmitt; Television broadcast: Seven Network, Fox Footy (simulcast)
3: Walters; 2: Barlow, Crozier, Fyfe; 1: Sandilands	Goals	4: Gray, Wingard; 3: Wines, 1: Monfries, Polec, Schulz, White
Fyfe, Neale, Walters, Mayne, Mundy, Sandilands	Best	Gray, Wines, Wingard, Hartlett, Carlile, Westhoff
Dawson (striking)	Reports

=== Week three (preliminary finals) ===
==== First preliminary final (Sydney vs. North Melbourne) ====
First preliminary final
Friday, 19 September (7:50pm)	Sydney	def.	North Melbourne	ANZ Stadium (crowd: 48,029)	Report
4.5 (29); 9.10 (64); 13.17 (95); 19.22 (136)	Q1; Q2; Q3; Final	1.2 (8); 4.4 (28); 6.7 (43); 9.11 (65)	Umpires: Nicholls, Meredith, Pannell; Television broadcast: Seven Network, Fox Footy (simulcast)
5: Franklin; 4: Tippett; 3: Parker, Goodes, 1: Jetta, Jack, McGlynn, Bird	Goals	3: Petrie; 2: Brown; 1: Goldstein, Greenwood, Harvey, Atley
Franklin, Parker, Kennedy, Rohan, Tippett, Cunningham, Jack, McGlynn	Best	Cunnington, Brown, Greenwood, Dal Santo
Reid (right knee)	Injuries	Thompson (corked hip)

==== Second preliminary final (Hawthorn vs. Port Adelaide) ====
Second preliminary final
Saturday, 20 September (4:45pm)	Hawthorn	def.	Port Adelaide	MCG (crowd: 74,856)	Report
2.3 (15); 8.4 (52); 13.6 (84); 15.7 (97)	Q1; Q2; Q3; Final	3.9 (27); 5.11 (41); 8.13 (61); 13.16 (94)	Umpires: Rosebury, Stevic, Schmitt; Television broadcast: Seven Network, Fox Footy (simulcast)
6: Roughead; 2: Gunston, Smith, 1: Hale, Langford, Suckling, Duryea, Hodge	Goals	4: Monfries; 3: Gray; 1: Neade, Wingard, Westhoff, Boak, Schulz, Polec
Roughead, Hodge, Mitchell, Langford, Smith, Hill, Stratton	Best	Boak, Ebert, Gray, Hombsch, Jonas, Monfries
Lewis (corked thigh)	Injuries	Hombsch (concussion)

=== Week four (Grand Final) ===
Grand Final
Saturday, 27 September (2:30 pm)	Sydney	def. by	Hawthorn	MCG (crowd: 99,454)	Report
2.3 (15); 5.3 (33); 8.5 (53); 11.8 (74)	Q1; Q2; Q3; Final	5.5 (35); 11.9 (75); 16.11 (107); 21.11 (137)	Umpires: Meredith, Nicholls, Sevic; Norm Smith Medal: Luke Hodge; Television broadcast: Seven Network; National anthem: Olivia Newton-John
4: Franklin; 2: Goodes, Jack; 1: Kennedy, Tippett	Goals	5: Roughead; 3: Breust, Langford; 2: Burgoyne, Gunston, Hodge; 1: Hale, Hill, Puopolo, Suckling
Franklin, Malceski, Kennedy, Shaw, Goodes	Best	Hodge, Lewis, Mitchell, Roughead, Hill, Lake, Langford, Burgoyne
Jetta (concussion)	Injuries
