= History of the Australian Football League =

The AFL Australian Football League is the top professional Australian rules football league in the world. The league consists of eighteen teams: nine based in the city of Melbourne, one from regional Victoria, and eight based in other Australian states. The reason for this unbalanced geographic distribution lies in the history of the league, which was based solely within Victoria from the time it was established in 1897, until the time the league expanded through the addition of clubs from interstate to the existing teams starting in the 1980s; until this expansion, the league was known as the VFL (Victorian Football League).

== VFL begins ==
The Victorian Football League was established in 1896 when six of the strongest clubs in Victoria—Collingwood, Essendon, Fitzroy, Geelong, Melbourne, and South Melbourne—broke away from the established Victorian Football Association to establish the new league. The six clubs invited two more VFA clubs—Carlton and St Kilda—to join the league for its inaugural season in 1897. Among the notable initiatives established in the new league was an annual finals tournament rather than awarding the premiership directly to the team with the best record in the season; additionally, the formal establishment of the modern scoring system was set in which six points are scored for a goal, and one point scored for a behind.

Although the Victorian Football League and the Victorian Football Association continued to compete for spectator interest for many years, the VFL quickly established itself as the premier competition in Victoria. In the early years, Fitzroy and Collingwood were the dominant teams. Following the arrival of Jack Worrall as coach in 1903, Carlton began a dominating period, during which they won three successive flags from 1906 to 1908; although Worrall was the club secretary, he took on a player management and "direction role", which is today recognised as the first official coaching job in the league. Essendon won flags in 1911 and 1912, also under Jack Worrall's coaching.

In 1908, the league expanded to ten teams, with Richmond crossing from the VFA, and University from the Metropolitan Football Association. University, after three promising seasons, finished last each year from 1911 until 1914, including losing an unprecedented 51 matches in a row; this was in part caused by its players' focus on their studies rather than football, particularly during examinations, and it was partly because the club operated on an amateur basis at a time when player payments were becoming common—and, as a result, the club withdrew from the VFL at the end of 1914. University teams now compete in the Victorian Amateur Football Association.

From 1907 until 1914, the VFL premier and the premier of the Adelaide-based South Australian Football League met in a playoff match for the Championship of Australia.

=== Between the world wars (1914–1945) ===
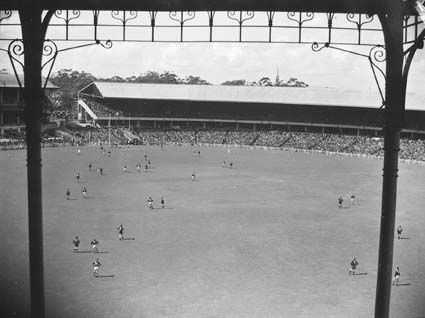
The VFL grand final in 1946 from the stands of the Melbourne Cricket Ground

In 1919, the VFL established a seconds/reserves competition to run alongside the senior competition. In 1924, the VFL inaugurated the Brownlow Medal for the player who received the most votes from the umpires for the fairest and best player. Richmond won its first Premierships in 1920 and 1921, but Essendon—battlers since their 1912 flag—took over as the dominant team between 1922 and 1926.

In 1925, the VFL expanded from nine teams to twelve, with Footscray, Hawthorn and North Melbourne each crossing from the VFA. North Melbourne and Hawthorn remained very weak in the VFL for a very long period. North Melbourne did not win more than eight games in a season until 1944, and Hawthorn only once won more than seven in a season until 1954. Between them, Hawthorn and North Melbourne finished in last place 15 of the 29 years from their admittance until 1953. Footscray adapted to the VFL with the most ease of the three clubs, and by 1928 were well off the bottom rungs of the ladder.

Between the years of 1927 and 1930, Collingwood became the first and, so far, only team to win four successive premierships. The club also finished the 1929 home-and-away season without losing a game, a feat yet to be repeated. This team became known as "the Machine" because of the organised and consistent way it played. With premiership victories in 1935 and 1936, the Collingwood Football Club had already won 11 Premierships, four more than the next most successful club, Fitzroy (7).

In the 1930s, Richmond and South Melbourne rivaled Collingwood as the best team. Melbourne, which had won the Premiership in 1926 but had fallen off sharply, developed a powerful attacking side that swept all before it between 1939 and 1941 to win three successive flags. Essendon, after a lean decade in the 1930s, enjoyed a dominant period with nine grand final appearances between 1941 and 1951. For more information on how world wars affected the VFL, see: The VFL during the World Wars.

=== 1950s ===
In 1946, the VFL established an Under-19s grade of competition to run alongside the seniors and reserves. In 1951, the McClelland Trophy was established as a prize for the best-performing team across all three grades. In 1952, the VFL hosted 'National Day', where all six matches were played outside of Melbourne. Matches were played at the Sydney Cricket Ground, Brisbane Exhibition Ground, North Hobart Oval, Albury Sports Ground and Victorian country towns Yallourn and Euroa. Of these matches Geelong v Essendon in Brisbane drew 28,000, Collingwood v Richmond in Sydney drew 25,000, Fitzroy v Melbourne in Hobart drew 18,387 and Melbourne s North Melbourne in Albury drew 15,000 spectators.

In 1959, the VFL planned the code's first purpose-built mega-stadium, VFL Park (later known as Waverley Park), to give it some independence from the Melbourne Cricket Club, which managed the Melbourne Cricket Ground. VFL Park was planned to hold 155,000 spectators, to make it making it one of the largest stadiums in the world—although it would ultimately be built with a capacity of 78,000. Land for the stadium was purchased at Mulgrave, in those days just farmland, but one day predicted to be near demographic centre of Melbourne's population.

Geelong was the stand-out team at the beginning of the 1950s, winning the Premiership in 1951 and then setting an enduring record of 23 consecutive wins, starting in Round 12, 1952, and ending in Round 13, 1953. This streak included the 1952 Premiership. In 1954, Footscray became the first of the 1925 expansion teams to win the premiership.

Melbourne became a powerhouse during the 1950s and early 1960s under coach Norm Smith and star player Ron Barassi. The club contested seven consecutive grand finals from 1954 to 1960, winning five Premierships, including three in a row between 1955 and 1957.

Television coverage began in 1957, with direct telecasts of the final quarter permitted. At first, several channels competed by broadcasting different games. However, when the VFL found that television was reducing crowds, it decided that no coverage was to be allowed in 1960. In 1961, replays in Melbourne were introduced, although direct telecasts were rarely permitted there; other states and territories, however, enjoyed live telecasts every Saturday afternoon.

The VFL Premiership Trophy was first awarded in addition to a pennant flag in 1959; essentially, the same trophy design has been in use since.

=== 1960s ===
In the 1960s, television began to have a huge impact, which continues unabated to this day. Spectators hurried home from games to watch replays, and many former players took up positions as commentators on pre-game preview programs and post-game review programs. There were also several attempts at variety programs featuring VFL players, which proved a good way to supplement player salaries as well as capitalise on their popularity. The VFL played the first of a series of exhibition matches in 1962 in an effort to lift the international profile of the league.

Hawthorn won its first premiership in 1961, beating Footscray. Melbourne extended its success from the 1950s by winning the premiership in 1964, but its success ended abruptly when Barassi was recruited by Carlton as captain-coach after the season, followed by Norm Smith being sacked during the 1965 season. Melbourne would not return to the finals for 22 years, and they did not win another flag until 57 years later in 2021.

In 1966, St Kilda, which had never won a senior premiership in 84 years of competition, won its first and, to date, only premiership, in a famous grand final victory against Collingwood by one point.

=== 1970s ===
With the number of players recruited from country leagues increasing, the wealthier clubs were gaining an advantage that metropolitan zoning and the Coulter law (salary cap) restricting player payments had prevented in the past. Country zoning was introduced in the late 1960s, and while it pushed Essendon and Geelong from the top of the ladder, it created severe inequality during the 1970s and 1980s. In the six years between 1972 and 1987, only six of the league's twelve clubs—Carlton, Collingwood, Essendon, Hawthorn, North Melbourne and Richmond—played in grand finals; by comparison, nine different clubs had contested the seven grand finals between 1961 and 1967.

The 1970 season saw the opening of VFL Park, with the inaugural match being played between Geelong and Fitzroy on 18 April 1970. Construction work was carried out at the stadium as the 1970s progressed, culminating in the building of the now-heritage-listed Sir Kenneth Luke stand. The Queen of Australia, Elizabeth II, was a guest at the game and officially opened the stadium to the public. The 1970 grand final between traditional rivals Carlton and Collingwood, arguably the league's most famous game of all time, saw Carlton recover from a 44-point deficit at half-time to win the game by ten points; it featured a famous spectacular mark by Alex Jesaulenko, and it was witnessed by a record crowd of 121,696.

Carlton and Richmond won three premierships each between 1968 and 1974, facing each other in three grand finals. North Melbourne, after struggling for most of its time in the VFL, finally won its first premiership in 1975, contesting the grand final each year from 1974 to 1978 and winning two; three of those deciders were against fellow 1925 expansion team Hawthorn, who also won two premierships. Carlton won three premierships in four years, from 1979 to 1982.

Among the notable rule changes made during the decade were:

- The finals series was expanded from four teams to five in 1972.
- The introduction of the centre diamond, later changed to a square, to limit the number of players allowed around the center bounce to four per team.
- The introduction of a second field umpire in 1976.
- The introduction of unlimited interchange in 1978, replacing substitution, which had been in place previously.

=== 1980s ===
The 1980s was a period of significant structural change in Australian football around the country. The VFL was the most popular and dominant of the state leagues around the country in terms of overall attendance, interest, and money, and began to look towards expanding its influence directly into other states. The VFL and its top clubs already had the buying power to recruit top players from interstate. As a result of this, rising cost pressures were driving some of Victoria's weaker clubs into dire financial situations.

But in spite of the increasing dominance of Victoria, the country's three top leagues—the VFL, South Australia's SANFL, and Western Australia's WAFL—were never closer to an integrated competition than they were in the early 1980s, with teams from all three leagues competing in the Australian Football Championships Night Series, a competition run separately to the league competitions on weekday evenings.

South Melbourne became the first VFL club to relocate interstate, and the club moved to Sydney to become the Sydney Swans in 1982; under the private ownership of wealthy Dr Geoffrey Edelsten during the mid-1980s, Sydney became a successful team on-field. In 1986, the West Australian Football League and Queensland Australian Football League were awarded licences to join the VFL as expansion teams, leading to the establishment of the West Coast Eagles and Brisbane Bears, who both joined the league in 1987. These expansion team licenses were awarded on payment of multimillion-dollar fees which were not required of the existing VFL clubs. Interstate clubs dropped out of the Night Series, and by 1987 it consisted solely of VFL clubs; it was shifted to become a pre-season competition in 1988. In 1989, financial troubles nearly forced Footscray and Fitzroy to merge, but a fundraising event from Footscray supporters stopped the proposed merger at the eleventh hour.

The 1980s first saw new regular timeslots for VFL matches. VFL matches had previously been played on Saturday afternoons, but Sydney began playing its home matches on Sunday afternoons, and North Melbourne pioneered playing matches on Friday night. These have since become regular timeslots for all teams.

In the late 1980s, the former zoning arrangements which had led to such inequality between the stronger and weaker clubs began to be phased out. The first National Draft was introduced in 1986, and a salary cap was introduced in 1987. Over the following decade, these changes helped to equalise the clubs, minimising the ability for the richer clubs to dominate the league.

In 1984, there was a revival of the International Rules representative series, which had first been played in the 1960s. The matches were played with a hybrid set of rules based on Australian rules football and Gaelic football. It also began to pave the way for Gaelic footballers to convert to Australian football; pioneered by Melbourne and known as the Irish experiment, Irish players Sean Wight and Jim Stynes began their successful VFL/AFL careers in the mid-1980s. Many Irish players have since played professional AFL football.

On-field, the 1980s were dominated by Hawthorn, Essendon and Carlton: Hawthorn contested seven consecutive grand finals for four premierships; Carlton contested four grand finals for three flags; and Essendon contested three consecutive grand finals, all against Hawthorn, winning two, and establishing a bitter rivalry that would eventually reach a climax in the infamous 2004 Line in the Sand Match. In the process, Carlton and Essendon both passed Collingwood in terms of number of premierships won; since 1982, Carlton has continuously been the team with most premierships won, holding the position jointly with Essendon ever since the 2000 AFL Grand Final. The 1989 Grand Final between Hawthorn and Geelong is considered one of the finest and most violent grand finals, with many strong physical encounters, brutal injuries, heroic feats of near-fatal courage by Dermott Brereton and Robert DiPierdomenico, a joint grand final record nine goals by Geelong's Gary Ablett Sr., and Geelong coming back from a 36-point deficit at three-quarter time—only to fall six points short of victory.

== AFL ==
=== 1990s ===
The league was officially renamed the Australian Football League in 1990 to reflect the new national perspective; the VFA later took over the Victorian Football League name in 1996. Functionally, the AFL gave up control over its Victorian-based minor grades at the end of 1991—clubs continued to field reserves teams in the independent Victorian State Football League, while an entirely new under-18s competition (the TAC Cup) was established with new, zone-based clubs. Without minor grades, the McClelland Trophy was now awarded to the senior minor premiers.

Collingwood won the 1990 AFL Grand Final, ending a 32-year premiership drought, which featured a string of near misses known as the Colliwobbles that had seen the club lose eight grand finals.

In 1990, the SANFL's most successful club, Port Adelaide, made a bid for an AFL licence. In response, the SANFL established a composite South Australian team called the Adelaide Crows, which was awarded the licence instead and joined the league in 1991 as the fourth interstate club. The same year saw the West Coast Eagles become the first interstate club reach the grand final, losing to Hawthorn in the 1991 AFL Grand Final; the Eagles would then win the premiership in 1992 and 1994. In 1994, the Fremantle Football Club was formed in Western Australia; they joined the AFL in 1995, becoming the fifth interstate club.

In 1996, the VFL/AFL celebrated its centenary; the Australian Football Hall of Fame was established and the VFL/AFL Team of the Century was named. However, several Victorian clubs were in severe financial difficulties, most notably Fitzroy and Hawthorn. Hawthorn had proposed to merge with Melbourne to form the Melbourne Hawks, but the merger ultimately fell through, and both teams continued as separate entities. For Fitzroy, however, the club was too weak to continue by itself; the club nearly merged with North Melbourne to form the Fitzroy–North Melbourne Kangaroos, but after the other clubs voted against it, the club merged with Brisbane to become the Brisbane Lions instead. Fitzroy played its last match at the end of 1996. With the Brisbane–Fitzroy merger opening up a free slot for a 16th team, Port Adelaide was awarded an AFL licence, and they joined the league in 1997. The AFL rejected bids from Queensland club Southport Sharks and the Tasmanian government to enter teams, the latter of which saw renewed continual interest until they received a license in 2023.

Some of the rule changes of the decade included the introduction of a third field umpire and the blood rule in 1994, plus the introduction of a third (1994) and fourth (1998) interchange player. The International Rules Series against the Gaelic Athletic Association was revived again in 1998, and it has become a semi-permanent fixture since. The finals series was expanded from five teams to six in 1991, and then to eight teams in 1994. The McIntyre final eight system was used by the AFL from 1994 until 1999.

Through the 1990s, there was a significant trend of Melbourne-based teams abandoning the use of their small (20,000–30,000 capacity) suburban venues for home matches in favour of the larger MCG and Waverley Park. The 1990s saw the last matches played at Windy Hill (Essendon), Moorabbin Oval (St Kilda), Western Oval (Footscray) and Victoria Park (Collingwood), and saw Princes Park abandoned by its long-term co-tenant Hawthorn. The transition to the use of only two venues in Melbourne was ultimately completed in 2005, when Carlton abandoned the use of Princes Park.

There was no dominant club in the latter part of the 1990s, although North Melbourne was the most successful, winning two premierships (1996 and 1999) from three grand finals. Adelaide won two grand finals (1997 and 1998), and Carlton won one grand final (1995) from two appearances.

In 1999, the league sold Waverley Park stadium and used the funds in a joint venture to begin construction of a brand-new stadium situated at Melbourne's Docklands.

Representative state football went on hiatus, with the last State of Origin match being held in 1999: the concept would be revived in 2026.

=== 2000s ===
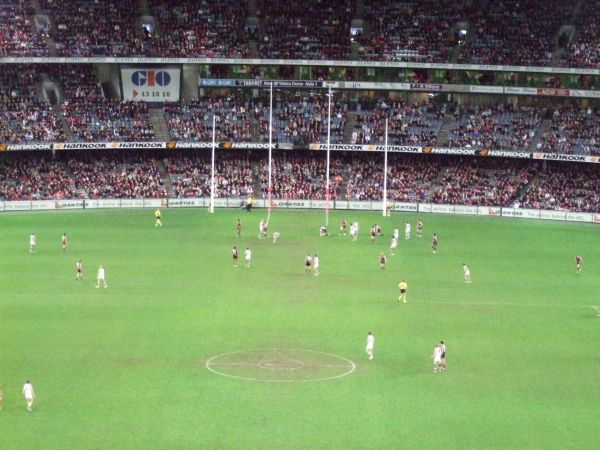
An AFL Match at Docklands Stadium

The AFL logo was again changed in 2000, with a new look intended to coincide with the new millennium. Rivals Collingwood and Carlton played a pre-season match known as the 'Millennium Match' on New Year's Eve 1999. The new Docklands Stadium hosted its first match in Round 1, 2000, and it was the first AFL match played under a retractable roof. After Victorian State Football League ceased operations at the end of 1999, the Victorian-based AFL clubs established connections with the Victorian Football League (a rebranding of the former VFA), with clubs either fielding reserves teams in the VFL, or entering into affiliations with existing senior VFL clubs to serve as feeder teams.

The early 2000s were dominated by Essendon, Brisbane and Port Adelaide, who shared the five flags from 2000 to 2004. Essendon won minor premierships in 1999–2001 but converted only in the 2000 grand final; Essendon's 2000 season set an enduring record, with a win–loss record of 24–1 across the home-and-away season and finals, the best ever recorded. Brisbane contested four consecutive grand finals, winning three premierships in the years 2001, 2002, and 2003. Port Adelaide won minor premierships from 2002–2004, and they broke through for its first premiership in 2004 after being labelled "chokers" for failing to capitalise on their previous two years at the top of the ladder. The dominance of interstate clubs continued to six consecutive flags, with Sydney and West Coast facing each other in both the 2005 and 2006 grand finals—for one flag each—with both matches decided by less than a goal.

The 2002 season saw the Carlton Football Club finish last, becoming the last of the twelve VFL clubs to win its first wooden spoon, before being heavily penalised for cheating the salary cap a few years earlier; the penalties saw Carlton stay near the bottom of the ladder in most of the subsequent seasons.

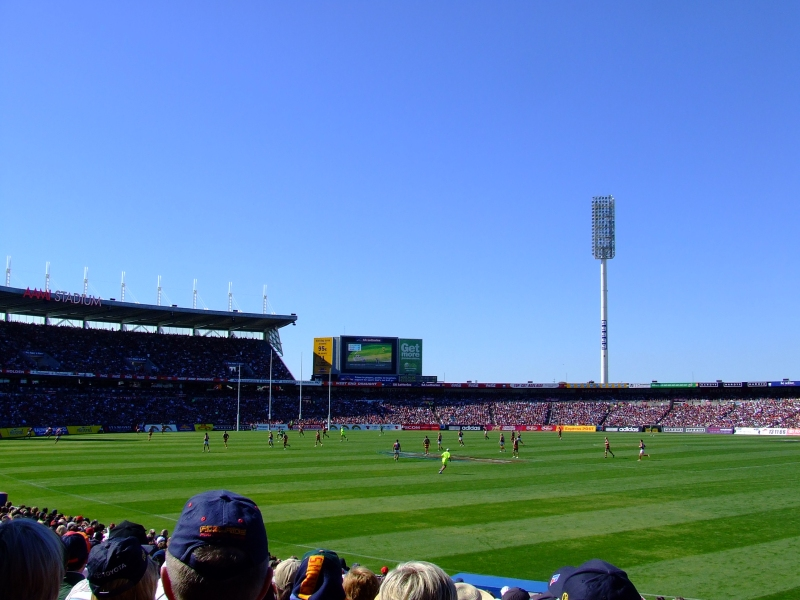
An AFL match at Football Park in Adelaide

A series of new rule changes were introduced for the 2006 season, intended to speed up the game, including allowing full-backs to kick in more quickly after a behind, and limiting the length of time that a player was allowed to hold the ball after a mark to 8 seconds for a mark in general play, and 30 seconds for a set shot.

Several teams established a regular presence in other parts of Australasia during the 21st century, generally by playing between one and four home matches in the alternative location. Among the notable contracts included Hawthorn (Launceston), St Kilda (Launceston and Wellington), North Melbourne (Gold Coast, Canberra and Hobart), Richmond (Cairns), Port Adelaide (Darwin) and the Western Bulldogs (Darwin).

In 2007, Geelong beat Port Adelaide by a record 119 points in the grand final. In 2008, Hawthorn beat the dominant team, Geelong, to win the flag. In 2009, Geelong claimed vindication from their 2008 premiership loss by being the only team of the modern era to overcome a three-quarter-time deficit during the grand final, to defeat St. Kilda in the 2009 grand final.

=== 2010s ===
In 2010, Collingwood and St. Kilda contested the first drawn grand final of the modern era. The AFL faced much scrutiny, with the current rule at the time having the grand final being replayed the following week. In 2016, the rule was changed so that a period of extra time is played in lieu of a replay the next week. Collingwood won the grand final replay decisively.

In the late 2000s, the AFL looked to establish a permanent presence on the Gold Coast, which was fast-developing as a major population centre. North Melbourne, who was in financial difficulty and had played a few home games on the Gold Coast in previous years, was offered significant subsidies to relocate to the Gold Coast, but the club declined. The AFL then began work to establish a club on the Gold Coast as a new expansion team; the Gold Coast Suns were established, and they joined the AFL in 2011 as the 17th team; they finished last on the ladder. The same year, Collingwood played Geelong in the 2011 grand final. Collingwood had only lost to one team all year, Geelong, and now faced them to win back-to-back premierships. The game was in the balance until the final quarter, where Geelong pulled away to win their third flag in five years.The Greater Western Sydney Giants, based on both Western Sydney and Canberra, were then established and entered the league as the 18th team for the 2012 season.

Sydney Swans beat the Hawthorn Hawks in the 2012 grand final. Hawthorn beat first-time grand finalist Fremantle to win the 2013 premiership. In 2014, Hawthorn got revenge on the Sydney Swans for their 2012 loss by winning the second of their back-to-back flags. In 2015, tragedy struck when Adelaide coach Phil Walsh was murdered mid-season, causing an outpouring of grief and the first-ever AFL game cancellation. West Coast made the grand final after beating Hawthorn earlier in the finals, facing them in the 2015 grand final. Hawthorn then won their third flag in as many years. In 2016, the Western Bulldogs, plagued by injuries, finished the regular season in seventh place, the second-lowest team to qualify for finals. However, the Western Bulldogs rallied to win the 2016 flag after a 62-year premiership drought, only the second premiership in their club's history. And in 2017, the Richmond Tigers won the flag after a miraculous season and a surprising win over minor premiers Adelaide Crows. Richmond won their first in 37 years and broke a record for biggest comeback season after finishing 13th in 2016; additionally, Richmond's Dustin Martin became the first player in VFL/AFL history to win a Brownlow Medal, a Norm Smith Medal, and a premiership medallion in the same year. The 2018 season ended bitterly for Collingwood, losing to the West Coast Eagles by five points in the 2018 grand final.

The decade came to a close in the 2019 season when first-time grand finalists Greater Western Sydney Giants were obliterated by Richmond, who finished with a score of 114 to 25 to win the 2019 grand final; GWS posted the lowest score in a VFL/AFL grand final since 1960.

=== 2020s ===
As with most of the sporting world, AFL in the early 2020s was majorly impacted by the COVID-19 pandemic. In addition to putting the health of players, staff, and spectators in jeopardy, the 2020 AFL season needed to be majorly restructured to accommodate unprecedented challenges. This meant a shortened draw, strict crowd limits, and significant financial losses for the league.

Like many professional sports leagues, the AFL sustained heavy operating losses during the first couple years as it scrambled to mitigate the financial damage of the pandemic. In 2020, the AFL posted a A$22 million (US$16.5 million) loss, while 2021 saw an additional A$43 million (US$32.3 million) in losses, totalling A$65 million (US$48.9 million) in the worst-affected seasons.

The 2020 grand final, which was won by Richmond after defeating Geelong by a 31-point margin, was held on 24 October 2020, about a month after the originally scheduled grand final. The game was played at night (a first) and was the first grand final to be played outside Victoria, done so due to pandemic restrictions. It was contested at the Gabba in front of size-restricted crowd of 29,707. It was the lowest VFL/AFL grand final attendance for more than a century (1917, during World War I).

The 2021 season also saw disruptions, but the disruptions were far less extreme compared to 2020. Melbourne defeated the Western Bulldogs by 74 points; the win was Melbourne's first premiership since 1964.

The 2022 season could mostly go ahead as intended due to 95% of the adult population being vaccinated to the two-dose standard. The AFL maintained a strict vaccination requirement and implemented a generous top-up list to compensate for self-isolating players. The 2022 grand final eclipsed 100,000 spectators for the first time since 2019 and was won by Geelong, who defeated Sydney by a margin of 81 points.

In 2025, former player Mitch Brown came out publicly as bisexual, becoming the AFL's first openly bisexual past or present player. Before his coming out, the AFL was the only major professional men's sport league worldwide to have never had an openly bisexual or gay past or present player.

== History ==
=== Competition timeline ===
- Due to World War I, Melbourne did not compete from 1916 to 1918, Essendon and St Kilda did not compete in 1916 and 1917, and Geelong and South Melbourne did not compete in 1916.
- Due to World War II, Geelong did not compete in 1942 and 1943.
- Due to the worldwide coronavirus pandemic, the 2020 season was suspended after Round 1 was played in front of empty stadiums. The 2020 season resumed in a restructured shortened season on 11 June; matches were played without (or with very limited) public attendance.
