= 2013 AFL Grand Final =

Grand final of the 2013 Australian Football League season

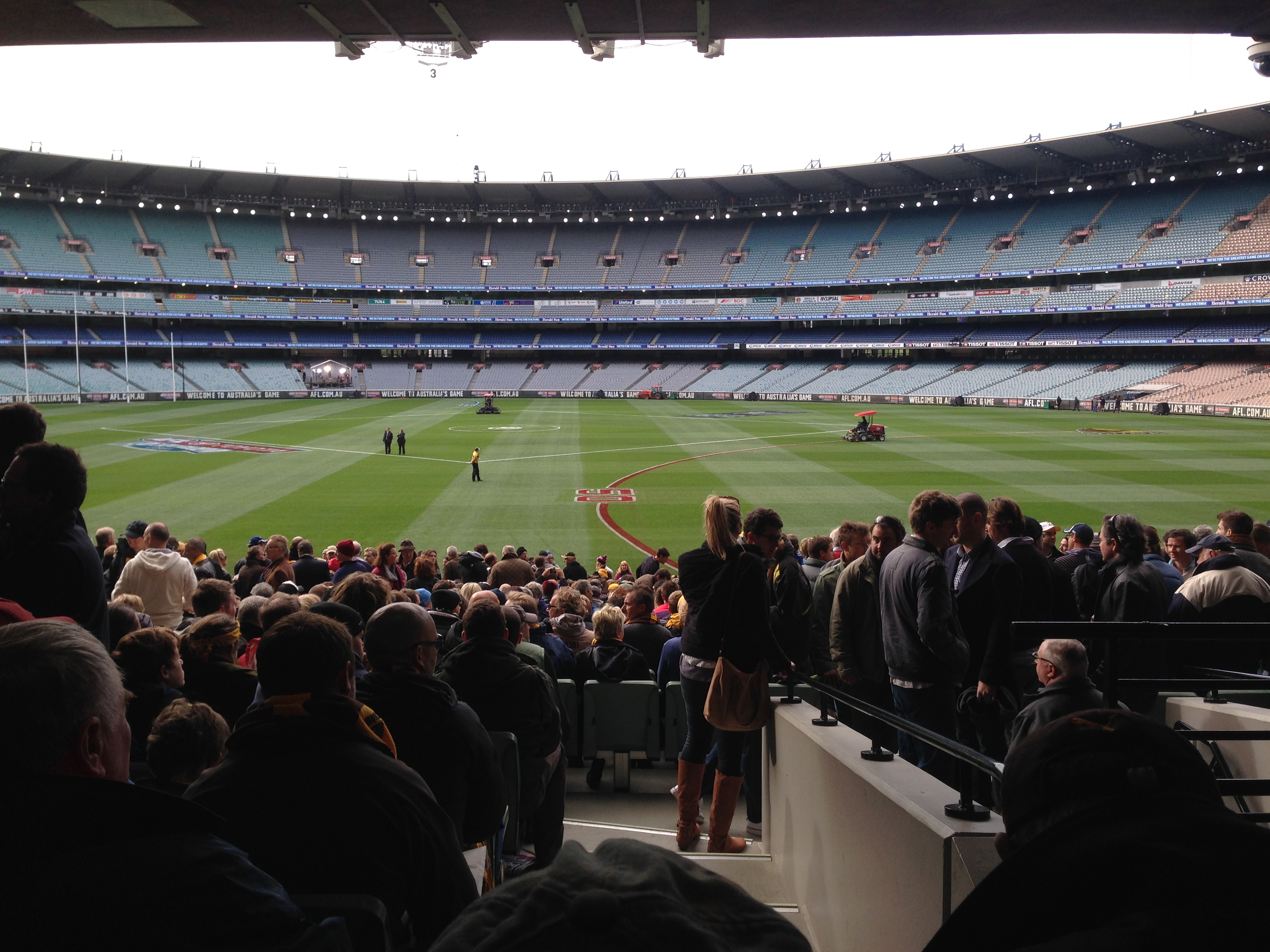
- View of the Melbourne Cricket Ground moments after gates opened for the 2013 AFL Grand Final.

Hawthorn	Fremantle
11.11 (77)	8.14 (62)
	1	2	3	4
HAW	2.3 (15)	5.5 (35)	8.8 (56)	11.11 (77)
FRE	0.3 (3)	1.6 (12)	6.10 (46)	8.14 (62)
- Date: 28 September 2013, 2:30pm
- Stadium: Melbourne Cricket Ground
- Attendance: 100,007
- Favourite: Hawthorn
- Umpires: Brett Rosebury, Simon Meredith, Matthew Nicholls
- Coin toss won by: Fremantle
- Kicked toward: City End

Ceremonies
- Pre-match entertainment: Birds of Tokyo
- National anthem: Tina Arena
- Halftime show: Hunters and Collectors
- Post-match entertainment: Hunters and Collectors, Birds of Tokyo

Accolades
- Norm Smith Medallist: Brian Lake (Hawthorn)
- Jock McHale Medallist: Alastair Clarkson (Hawthorn)

Broadcast in Australia
- Network: Seven Network

The 2013 AFL Grand Final was an Australian rules football game contested between Hawthorn Football Club and Fremantle Football Club at the Melbourne Cricket Ground on 28 September 2013. It concluded the 118th season of the Australian Football League (formerly the Victorian Football League), staged to determine the premiers for the 2013 AFL season. The match, attended by 100,007 spectators, was won by Hawthorn by a margin of 15 points, marking the club's eleventh VFL/AFL premiership victory. Hawthorn's Brian Lake was awarded the Norm Smith Medal as the best player on the ground.

== Background ==
Hawthorn entered the 2013 season having lost the 2012 Grand Final to Sydney, and for most of the season was seen as the favourites for the premiership. After losing to Geelong in Round 1, Hawthorn compiled a 12-match winning streak, until this streak was ended with another loss to Geelong in Round 15. The club's only other loss came against Richmond in Round 19, and it finished with a record of 19–3 to win the minor premiership for the second consecutive year. They defeated Sydney in the qualifying final by 54 points and earned a week off. They ended an 11-match losing streak against Geelong since the 2008 AFL Grand Final to win by five points in the preliminary final. It was Hawthorn's third grand final appearance in six years, and was the second of four consecutive grand final appearances between 2012 and 2015.

Fremantle entered the 2013 season having come off a semi-final loss to Adelaide in the previous year's finals series. After winning their first two matches of the season by 28 points, the Dockers lost back-to-back matches against Essendon and Hawthorn to be 2–2 after Round 4 – this was the only time they lost consecutive matches during the season. Fremantle recorded its largest ever victory when they defeated Greater Western Sydney in Round 20, then, with a finals berth guaranteed, Ross Lyon rested half of his regular side ahead of its final regular season match against St Kilda; the result was a 71-point defeat. The team finished third at the end of the home-and-away season, and compiled a club-best record of 16–5–1. They unexpectedly defeated Geelong in Geelong by 15 points in the first week of the finals, which earned them a week off and a home preliminary final. Fremantle defeated the reigning premiers, Sydney, by 25 points in the preliminary final. It was Fremantle's first grand final appearance, in its 19th season in the AFL.

The two teams met once during the regular season, in Round 4 at Aurora Stadium; Hawthorn won by 42 points.

== Pre-match entertainment ==
Two Australian bands, Birds of Tokyo and Hunters & Collectors, performed before the game and at half-time, respectively. The Australian national anthem was sung by Tina Arena.

== Match summary ==
=== First quarter ===
Fremantle won the coin toss and chose to kick towards the City end in the first quarter. Hawthorn got off to a good start, with Jack Gunston kicking the first goal in the 4th minute. It was more than ten minutes until the second goal, Lance Franklin kicked a goal for Hawthorn in the 18th minute after Luke McPharlin gave away a 50-metre penalty for stepping over the mark. Hawthorn then had a few chances to extend the margin, however a rushed behind and missed opportunities by Shaun Burgoyne and Isaac Smith, had little influence on the scoreboard. Meanwhile, Fremantle was held goalless in the opening quarter with Hayden Ballantyne and Nick Suban missing relatively easy shots on goal early in the quarter, while Nathan Fyfe missed two shots out on the full. At quarter time, Hawthorn 2.3 (15) led Fremantle 0.3 (3) for a 12-point lead.

=== Second quarter ===
Hawthorn started off the second quarter strongly. Gunston kicked his second goal on the run from just inside 50m in the 5th minute, before Cyril Rioli caught Lee Spurr for holding the ball and kicked a goal from the free kick in the 8th minute, taking the Hawks to a 24 point lead. Finally in the 13th minute, Tendai Mzungu kicked the Dockers' first goal, before Ryan Crowley kicked another behind for Fremantle. This was quickly followed by Gunston kicking his third goal after outpositioning Fremantle's Zac Dawson in a marking contest. The two teams then exchanged behinds with Rioli and Brad Sewell for Hawthorn and Matthew Pavlich and Fyfe for Fremantle all scoring. Hawthorn held a 23-point lead at half time, and Fremantle's first half score of 1.6 (12) was the lowest in a grand final since 1960.

=== Third quarter ===
After failing to capitalise on chances in the first half, Fremantle began a comeback in the third quarter. After one minute, Pavlich kicked his first goal for Fremantle, before Jarryd Roughead kicked his first for Hawthorn. This was followed by three goals in seven minutes to Fremantle with goals to Pavlich (8th minute), Michael Walters (12th minute), and a 55-metre set shot bomb from Chris Mayne (14th minute), to take the Dockers to within three points of the Hawks. Hawthorn attacked next, but Roughead and Rioli both missed opportunities, before Roughead managed to kick his second goal in the 19th minute from a free kick for being pushed in the back. Fremantle replied with behinds to Stephen Hill and Michael Barlow before Walters kicked his second goal in the 25th minute, reducing the margin back to three points. Hawthorn extended the lead when Gunston kicked a goal from the ensuing centre bounce. Gunston missed another set shot for a behind before the end of the quarter, giving Hawthorn a ten-point lead at three-quarter time: Hawthorn 8.8 (56), Fremantle 6.10 (46).

=== Final quarter ===
The first half of the final quarter was dominated by Hawthorn, who kicked 3.3 (21) inside the first fifteen minutes. Roughead first missed a snap shot before Isaac Smith kicked a set shot goal from 55 metres. Additional goals to Luke Breust and Bradley Hill and behinds from Roughead and Lance Franklin stretched the lead to 31 points. During Hawthorn's period of dominance, Brian Lake, a recently recruited defender from the Western Bulldogs, was instrumental in shutting down Fremantle's attacks, taking two critical contested marks from opposing kicks. Fremantle made a late comeback, with goals to Pearce (17th minute) and Pavlich (21st minute) reducing the margin to 17 points early in time-on. However, four attempts in the final ten minutes ended with behinds, to Hayden Ballantyne, Pavlich, Ryan Crowley and one rushed, and Hawthorn held on to win by 15 points.

=== Overall report ===
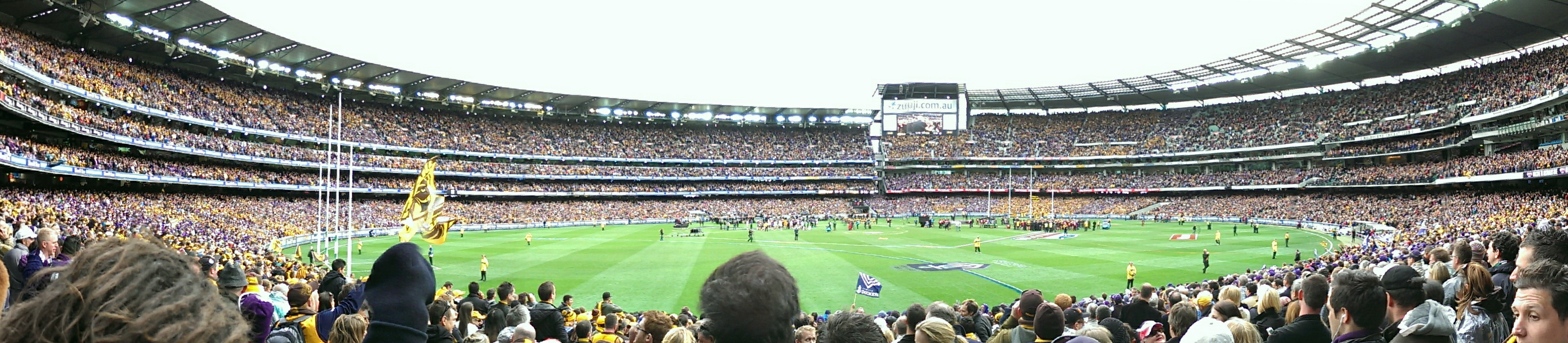
A panoramic view of the MCG for the game

Hawthorn led the match from start to finish but was outplayed for significant periods. Hawthorn had a slight edge in most key statistical indicators, but they were overall quite evenly matched: Hawthorn led disposals 337–333, inside-50s 45–44, tackles 80–65 and clearances 42–34. It was the first grand final which Champion Data assessed to have been won by the poorer side on the day, as Fremantle was left to rue the opportunities it had been unable to convert.

2013 was the first grand final appearance by Fremantle. Two years later, in 2015, Fremantle won the minor premiership for finishing on top of the AFL ladder at the end of the home & away season with a 17-5 win loss record, but failed to convert that achievement into another grand final appearance, losing to Hawthorn in the preliminary final. Fremantle did not reach another grand final until 2026.

=== Norm Smith Medal ===
Norm Smith Medal voting tally
Position	Player	Club	Total votes	Voting summary
1st (winner)	Brian Lake	Hawthorn	12	3,3,3,2,1
2nd	Jack Gunston	Hawthorn	11	3,3,2,2,1
3rd	David Mundy	Fremantle	4	2,1,1
4th	Luke Hodge	Hawthorn	2	2
5th	Nat Fyfe	Fremantle	1	1

Brian Lake took ten marks, of which seven were intercept marks to repel the Dockers' attack. He took two crucial marks in the final quarter which sealed his Norm Smith Medal win. Lake finished with 12 votes, just edging out teammate Jack Gunston with 11 votes who was also crucial on the day with his four goals. David Mundy (27 disposals, seven clearances) polled 4 votes, while Luke Hodge (21 disposals) and Nat Fyfe (28 disposals) polled 2 and 1 votes respectively. Lake subsequently accepted a four-match suspension for deliberately elbowing opponent Michael Walters in the jaw during the third quarter, making him the first Norm Smith Medalist to have committed a reportable offence during a grand final.

Typically prolific ball-winner Sam Mitchell had only 12 disposals for the game (compared to 33 and 34 disposals in Hawthorn's 2014 and 2015 premierships, respectively), but this was a plan Mitchell formulated to negate the effectiveness of Fremantle's 211-centimetre (6 ft 11 in) ruckman Aaron Sandilands – who had 44 hitouts as part of Fremantle's overall 55–27 hitout advantage, but without damaging effect. Mitchell's strategy was publicly revealed ten years later in his 2023 Australian Football Hall of Fame induction speech by teammate Luke Hodge.

In the 2013 Grand Final, we knew Sandilands was going to get the hit-out advantage. So Mitch went into the leadership group, put his hand up and said: "I’m happy to be the selfless guinea pig and just sit in Sandilands’ hit zone and fight like hell to stop them from winning it." I think he had 13 or 14 touches, but it was what he stood for. It was probably the most impactful game that he’s had without getting a lot of the ball. — Luke Hodge, reflecting on Sam Mitchell's personal game plan

Chaired by Brendan McCartney, the voters and their choices were as follows:

Voter	Role	3 votes	2 votes	1 vote
Brendan McCartney	Western Bulldogs Coach	Jack Gunston	Luke Hodge	Brian Lake
Karl Langdon	6PR	Jack Gunston	Brian Lake	Nat Fyfe
Glenn McFarlane	Herald Sun	Brian Lake	Jack Gunston	David Mundy
Adam McNicol	AFL Media	Brian Lake	Jack Gunston	David Mundy
Tony Shaw	3AW	Brian Lake	David Mundy	Jack Gunston

== Teams ==
Hawthorn	Fremantle

Hawthorn
B:	24 Ben Stratton	17 Brian Lake	14 Grant Birchall
HB:	9 Shaun Burgoyne	6 Josh Gibson	10 Bradley Hill
C:	16 Isaac Smith	5 Sam Mitchell	3 Jordan Lewis
HF:	22 Luke Breust	23 Lance Franklin	33 Cyril Rioli
F:	28 Paul Puopolo	2 Jarryd Roughead	19 Jack Gunston
Foll:	39 Max Bailey	12 Brad Sewell	15 Luke Hodge (c)
Int:	26 Liam Shiels	18 Brent Guerra	20 David Hale
Int:	32 Jonathan Simpkin (sub)		
Coach:	Alastair Clarkson		

Fremantle
B:	37 Michael Johnson	3 Zac Dawson	41 Paul Duffield
HB:	34 Lee Spurr	18 Luke McPharlin	6 Danyle Pearce
C:	16 David Mundy	15 Ryan Crowley	13 Tendai Mzungu
HF:	33 Cameron Sutcliffe	23 Chris Mayne	7 Nathan Fyfe
F:	1 Hayden Ballantyne	29 Matthew Pavlich (c)	10 Michael Walters
Foll:	31 Aaron Sandilands	9 Matt de Boer	32 Stephen Hill
Int:	30 Zac Clarke	8 Nick Suban	21 Michael Barlow
Int:	27 Lachie Neale (sub)		
Coach:	Ross Lyon		

Umpires

The umpiring panel for the grand final comprised nine match day umpires and three emergencies. Among the umpires were four grand final debutants: field umpire Mathew Nicholls, boundary umpires Michael Marantelli and Michael Saunders, and goal umpire Adam Wojcik.

2013 AFL Grand Final umpires
Position	Umpire 1	Umpire 2	Umpire 3	Umpire 4	Emergency
Field:	8 Brett Rosebury (6)	15 Mathew Nicholls (1)	21 Simon Meredith (2)		9 Matt Stevic
Boundary:	Nathan Doig (2)	Robert Haala (2)	Michael Marantelli (1)	Michael Saunders (1)	Matthew Tomkins
Goal:	Luke Walker (5)	Adam Wojcik (1)			Chris Appleton

Numbers in brackets represent the number of grand finals umpired; this number includes 2013 and does not include times selected as an emergency umpire.

== Scorecard ==
Grand Final
Saturday, 28 September (2:30 pm)	Hawthorn	def.	Fremantle	MCG (crowd: 100,007)	Report
2.3 (15); 5.5 (35); 8.8 (56); 11.11 (77)	Q1; Q2; Q3; Final	0.3 (3); 1.6 (12); 6.10 (46); 8.14 (62)	Umpires: Brett Rosebury, Mathew Nicholls, Simon Meredith; Norm Smith Medal: Brian Lake; Television broadcast: Seven Network; National anthem: Tina Arena
Gunston 4 Roughead 2 Franklin, Rioli, Smith, Breust, Hill 1	Goals	3 Pavlich; 2 Walters; 1 Mzungu, Mayne, Pearce
Lake, Gunston, Lewis, Rioli, Hodge, Birchall	Best	Mundy, Fyfe, Crowley, Johnson, Barlow, Pavlich
Nil	Injuries	Nil
Lake - Striking; Rioli - Rough conduct	Reports	Suban - Misconduct

== Tribunal ==
The following Monday, the Match Review Panel adjudicated on two offences incurred by Hawthorn's Brian Lake and Cyril Rioli, both of which carried the double points loading of due to being incurred during a grand final. The third offence of misconduct against Fremantle's Nick Suban was referred directly to the Tribunal for assessment, which determined the incident was improper but not grievous. Suban pleaded guilty to the incident and apologized for what he felt to be an accident.

Player	Charge	Penalty
Nick Suban, Fremantle	Unreasonable and unnecessary contact to the face of Sam Mitchell, Hawthorn, in the 1st Quarter.	Referred to the Tribunal. Suban pleaded guilty; suspended one match.
Cyril Rioli, Hawthorn	Rough conduct (chicken-wing tackle) against Michael Barlow, Fremantle, in the 3rd Quarter.	Pled guilty; suspended one match.
Brian Lake, Hawthorn	Striking Michael Walters, Fremantle, in the 3rd Quarter.	Pled guilty; suspended three matches.

== Media coverage ==
The match was televised by the Seven Network. The primary match commentary was provided by Bruce McAvaney and Dennis Cometti.

== See also ==
- 2013 NAB Cup
- 2013 AFL season
- 2013 AFL finals series
