= Max Bailey =

Australian rules footballer

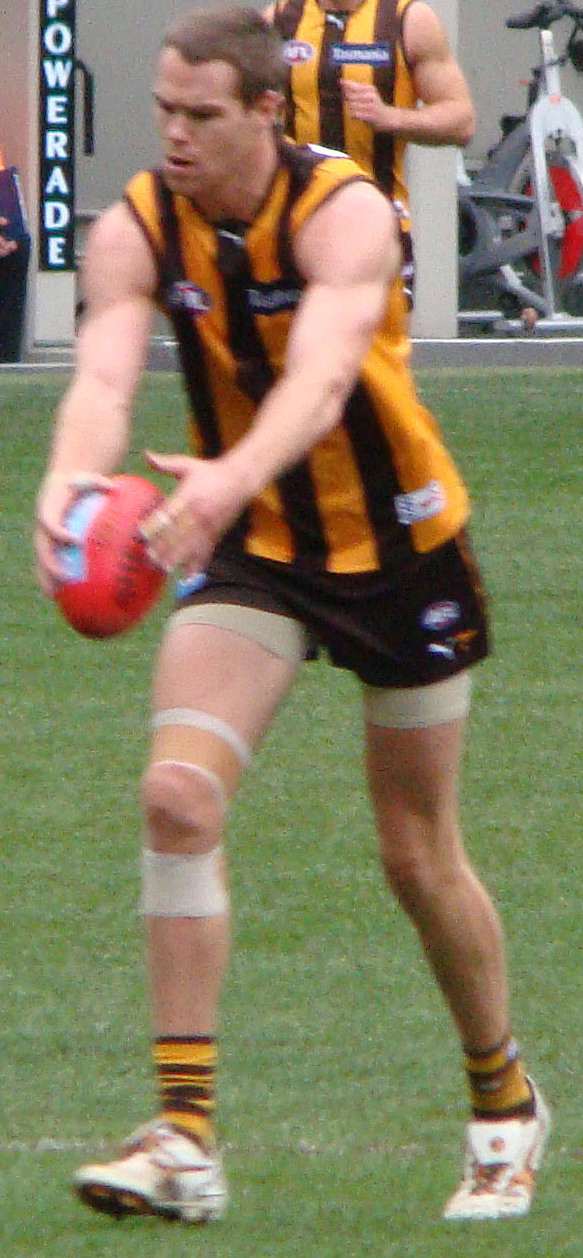
- Bailey playing for Hawthorn in 2011

Personal information
- Full name: Max Bailey
- Born: 23 October 1986 (age 40)
- Original team: West Perth (WAFL)
- Draft: No. 18, 2005 national draft
- Debut: Round 18, 2006, Hawthorn vs. Fremantle, at Subiaco Oval
- Height: 206 cm (6 ft 9 in)
- Weight: 101 kg (223 lb)
- Position: Ruckman

Playing career^{1}
Years	Club	Games (Goals)
2006–2013	Hawthorn	43 (10)
- ^{1} Playing statistics correct to the end of 2013.

Career highlights
- AFL premiership player: 2013

Max Bailey (born 23 October 1986) is a former Australian rules football coach and player who played with the Hawthorn Football Club in the Australian Football League. He most recently served as the development coach of the Hawthorn Football Club and head coach of the Box Hill Hawks Football Club. He now works at Nambour State College (NSC).

== AFL career ==
Drafted 18th overall by the Hawks in the 2005 AFL draft, the ruckman from West Perth made his AFL debut in round 18 of the 2006 season. However, he would miss the 2007 season after suffering a right knee ACL injury during training before the season started.

Max returned to the Box Hill Hawks reserves team for a game in June 2008, only to rupture his right ACL again which required another knee reconstruction. Max postponed the surgery to concentrate on his study then when the timing was right went under the knife. In May 2009 Max resumed training and was expected to play at the Box Hill Hawks in the later part of the season.

However he made his return in round 21, 2009 and had 23 hit outs in a win over Richmond. The following week against Essendon, Bailey suffered another ACL injury after he landed awkwardly and badly twisted his good left knee five minutes into the game and had to be helped from the ground. He sat on the bench in frustration and missed the 2010 season.

Throughout his succession of knee injuries, the Hawthorn Football Club kept the faith, retaining him on the senior list despite his first five years at the club yielding just six senior appearances.

Max Bailey returned in round 9 of 2011 in a win over Sydney. Looking finally free of the injury curse, Bailey made a total of 16 senior appearances in the side that year. By trading 2008 premiership ruck Brent Renouf to Port Adelaide at the end of the 2011 season, the club effectively endorsed Bailey and the other rucks on the list to carry the mantle in 2012 and beyond. This plan struck a snag during the 2012 pre-season, when Bailey aggravated a wrist injury, which was set to keep him on the sidelines for around 12 weeks.

During the 2013 season Bailey managed to cement a spot in the Hawthorn side, after playing well in round 1 in the Hawks loss to Geelong.

Bailey's football career ended in the pinnacle of sporting achievements, being a member of Hawthorn's 2013 Premiership side. Former captain Sam Mitchell referred to Bailey as "the greatest story of the 2013 premiership," in a speech at the club's best and fairest, where Bailey ended his AFL career, retiring after 43 games due continued problems with his right knee.

== Coaching career ==
After retiring from the game Bailey was employed by Richmond Football Club as a skills coach for two years, 2014–2015. Bailey spent six months in Tanzania before he accepted a position at his old club.

In 2019 he coached the affiliate club Box Hill Hawks, before departing in September 2020.

== Personal life ==
Bailey has a Bachelor of Business degree. As at 2021, Bailey worked in a human resources role with Bunnings.

== Statistics ==
Legend
G	Goals	K	Kicks	D	Disposals	T	Tackles
B	Behinds	H	Handballs	M	Marks	H/O	Hit-outs

Season	Team	No.	Games	Totals								Averages (per game)								Votes
Season	Team	No.	Games	G	B	K	H	D	M	T	H/O	G	B	K	H	D	M	T	H/O	Votes
2006	Hawthorn	36	4	0	0	5	15	20	10	5	23	0.0	0.0	1.3	3.8	5.0	2.5	1.3	5.8	0
2007	Hawthorn	36	0	—	—	—	—	—	—	—	—	—	—	—	—	—	—	—	—	0
2008	Hawthorn	36	0	—	—	—	—	—	—	—	—	—	—	—	—	—	—	—	—	0
2009	Hawthorn	1	2	0	0	3	6	9	1	6	25	0.0	0.0	1.5	3.0	4.5	0.5	3.0	12.5	0
2010	Hawthorn	1	0	—	—	—	—	—	—	—	—	—	—	—	—	—	—	—	—	0
2011	Hawthorn	39	16	3	3	88	82	170	35	58	328	0.2	0.2	5.5	5.1	10.6	2.2	3.6	20.5	0
2012	Hawthorn	39	2	0	0	3	9	12	3	8	51	0.0	0.0	1.5	4.5	6.0	1.5	4.0	25.5	0
2013^{#}	Hawthorn	39	19	7	1	88	81	169	41	52	396	0.4	0.1	4.6	4.3	8.9	2.2	2.7	20.8	0
Career			43	10	4	187	193	380	90	129	823	0.2	0.1	4.3	4.5	8.8	2.1	3.0	19.1	0

== Honours and achievements ==
Team

- AFL premiership player (Hawthorn): 2013
- 2× Minor premiership (Hawthorn): 2012, 2013
