= Liam Shiels =

Australian rules footballer (born 1991)

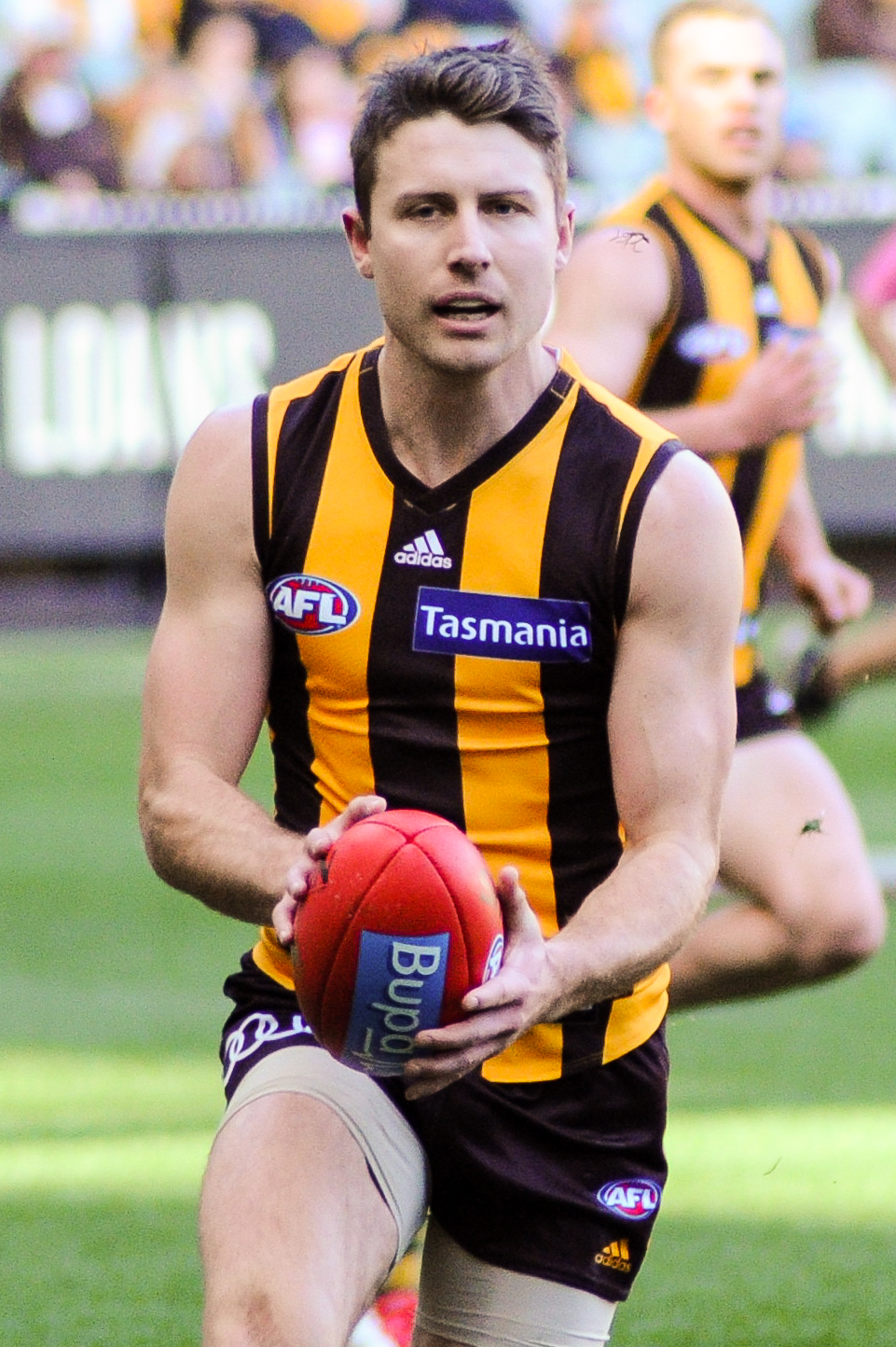
- Shiels playing for Hawthorn in June 2017

Personal information
- Full name: Liam Shiels
- Born: 29 April 1991 (age 35)
- Original team: The Basin / Eastern Ranges
- Draft: No. 34, 2008 national draft
- Debut: Round 10, 2009, Hawthorn vs. Adelaide, at AAMI Stadium
- Height: 183 cm (6 ft 0 in)
- Weight: 84 kg (185 lb)
- Position: Midfielder

Club information
- Current club: North Melbourne
- Number: 14

Playing career
Years	Club	Games (Goals)
2009–2022	Hawthorn	255 (90)
2023–2024	North Melbourne	33 (7)
Total		288 (97)

International team honours
Years	Team	Games (Goals)
2011	Australia	1 (0)

Career highlights
- 3× AFL premiership player: 2013–2015

Liam Shiels (born 29 April 1991) is a former Australian rules footballer who played for the Hawthorn Football Club and North Melbourne Football Club, in the Australian Football League (AFL). Shiels is a midfielder who developed into a key member of the midfield for Hawthorn that would win three premierships in a row from 2013 to 2015. Shiels would also serve as vice-captain for Hawthorn from 2017–2018.

== AFL career ==
Shiels was a 2nd round selection in the 2008 AFL draft, being selected at No. 34 overall. He was the youngest player drafted that year. Shiels was still a high school student when he joined the Hawks; as a result, Hawthorn needed to obtain special dispensation from Shiels' high school in order to enable him to train during periods where training clashed with his afternoon classes.

Not expected to play in his first year, Shiels was training part-time and completing his schooling at Aquinas College Melbourne but after performances playing for Box Hill, Shiels was promoted to play against Adelaide. He played eleven games in his debut season.

Shiels and Josh Gibson were the only Hawthorn players to play every game in 2011.

Shiels was made joint vice-captain of the club in 2017, together with Isaac Smith. During Hawthorn's poor start to the 2017 season, Shiels instigated an assessment that the club was not playing satisfactorily. In the preseason, Shiels was sent to the AFL tribunal for striking Darcy Lang, but was not suspended. Shiels was widely regarded as having performed well as vice-captain and player during the 2017 season, registering a personal record for number of clearances per game.

Liam Shiels was regarded as having another good season in 2018, recording the sixth highest number of tackles in the league and setting a new disposal average record.

Shiels, along with Smith was replaced as Co-Vice-Captain prior to the 2019 season with Jack Gunston, though he remained part of the leadership group. Shiels played his 200th game during that season, which was a 24-point victory over rivals Geelong.

On 31 August 2022, Shiels announced his retirement after 14 seasons, 255 games & 3 premierships with the Hawks. His retirement didn't last long though, as on 22 November 2022, he came out of retirement to play for North Melbourne as a rookie listed player, reuniting with coach Alastair Clarkson.

== Statistics ==
Legend
G	Goals	K	Kicks	D	Disposals	T	Tackles
B	Behinds	H	Handballs	M	Marks
#	Played in that season's premiership team

Season	Team	No.	Games	Totals							Averages (per game)							Votes
Season	Team	No.	Games	G	B	K	H	D	M	T	G	B	K	H	D	M	T	Votes
2009	Hawthorn	26	11	1	3	65	85	150	25	49	0.1	0.3	5.9	7.7	13.6	2.3	4.5	0
2010	Hawthorn	26	6	0	0	37	27	64	25	26	0.0	0.0	6.2	4.5	10.7	4.2	4.3	0
2011	Hawthorn	26	25	11	14	344	221	565	138	150	0.4	0.6	13.8	8.8	22.6	5.5	6.0	0
2012	Hawthorn	26	22	7	7	243	177	420	74	106	0.3	0.3	11.0	8.0	19.1	3.4	4.8	1
2013^{#}	Hawthorn	26	17	3	8	164	96	260	61	54	0.2	0.5	9.6	5.6	15.3	3.6	3.2	0
2014^{#}	Hawthorn	26	21	8	11	292	184	476	79	129	0.4	0.5	13.9	8.8	22.7	3.8	6.1	7
2015^{#}	Hawthorn	26	22	13	9	248	229	477	79	162	0.6	0.4	11.3	10.4	21.7	3.6	7.4	5
2016	Hawthorn	26	18	4	8	191	124	315	41	153	0.2	0.4	10.6	6.9	17.5	2.3	8.5	0
2017	Hawthorn	26	21	9	10	239	216	455	76	129	0.4	0.5	11.4	10.3	21.7	3.6	6.1	5
2018	Hawthorn	26	23	9	3	332	200	532	85	149	0.4	0.1	14.4	8.7	23.1	3.7	6.5	8
2019	Hawthorn	26	19	10	12	249	192	441	65	126	0.5	0.6	13.1	10.1	23.2	3.4	6.6	5
2020 (Note: The 2020 season was played with 17 home-and-away matches per team (down from 22) and 16-minute quarters with time on (down from 20-minute quarters with time on) due to the impact of the COVID-19 pandemic.)	Hawthorn	26	16	6	0	162	124	286	46	55	0.4	0.0	10.1	7.8	17.9	2.9	3.4	1
2021	Hawthorn	26	21	5	4	244	200	444	93	99	0.2	0.2	11.6	9.5	21.1	4.4	4.7	0
2022	Hawthorn	26	13	4	4	84	62	146	32	39	0.3	0.3	6.5	4.8	11.2	2.5	3.0	0
2023	North Melbourne	14	16	3	3	139	144	283	66	88	0.2	0.2	8.7	9.0	17.7	4.1	5.5	0
2024	North Melbourne	14	17	4	5	112	91	203	42	46	0.2	0.3	6.6	5.4	11.9	2.5	2.7	0
2025	North Melbourne	14	0	—	—	—	—	—	—	—	—	—	—	—	—	—	—	0
Career			288	97	101	3145	2372	5517	1027	1560	0.3	0.4	10.9	8.2	19.2	3.6	5.4	32

== Honours and achievements ==
Team

- 3× AFL premiership player (Hawthorn): 2013, 2014, 2015
- 2× Minor premiership (Hawthorn): 2012, 2013

Individual

- Hawthorn vice-captain: 2017–2018
- Hawthorn best player in finals: 2018
- Hawthorn best clubman: 2017
- Hawthorn most improved player: 2011
- Hawthorn best first year player (debut season): 2009
- Australian international rules football team: 2011
- Hawthorn life member
