= Jake Neade =

Australian rules footballer

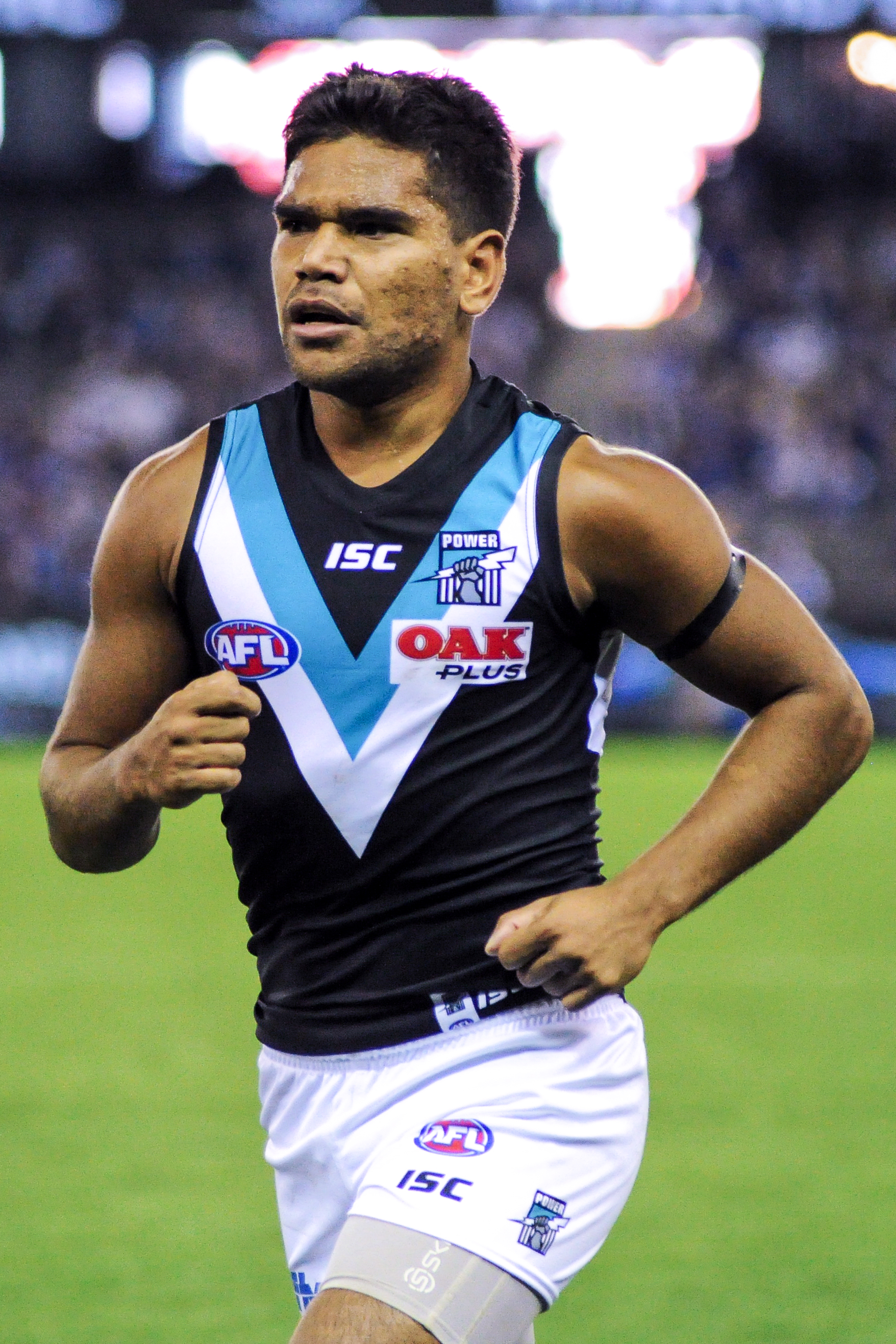
- Neade playing for Port Adelaide in 2018.

Personal information
- Born: 29 May 1994 (age 32); Elliott, Northern Territory
- Original team: North Ballarat Rebels (TAC Cup)
- Height: 171 cm (5 ft 7 in)
- Weight: 71 kg (157 lb)
- Position: Forward

Playing career^{1}
Years	Club	Games (Goals)
2013–2018	Port Adelaide	66 (55)
- ^{1} Playing statistics correct to the end of 2018.

Career highlights
- 2013 AFL Rising Star nominee

Jake Neade (born 29 May 1994) is an Australian rules footballer who last played for the Port Adelaide Football Club in the Australian Football League (AFL).

== Early life ==
Of Jingili Indigenous Australian heritage and born and raised in Elliott, Northern Territory, he made the move in his mid teens down to Victoria where he attended school at St Patrick's College, Ballarat where he shone as a real talent in the school's first XVIII, winning the Herald Sun Shield 3 times in 3 years. He was traded to Port Adelaide during the 2012 trade week from Greater Western Sydney. (Note: He was able to be traded by Greater Western Sydney as they had zoned player access to all Northern Territory players) Neade is a midfielder/forward known for his attack and creativity with the ball and strong tackling. He won the Harrison Medal (Division 2 best and fairest) and achieved All-Australian honours in the 2012 AFL Under 18 Championships averaging 18.4 disposals and 3.6 tackles. Neade arrived at Port Adelaide as their smallest player weighing in at 67 kg and being 170 cm tall.

== AFL career ==
Neade made his unofficial debut with the Power in the 2013 NAB Cup opener against St Kilda showing bursts of speed, poise in close and a frenetic work-rate. He totaled 8 disposals and 1 goal in a half of football.

He played his first official AFL match in the opening round of the 2013 AFL season against Melbourne at the Melbourne Cricket Ground in Port's 79-point victory. For Round 13, 2013, Neade was awarded a NAB rising star nomination.

== Statistics ==
Statistics are correct to the end of 2018.

Legend
G	Goals	K	Kicks	D	Disposals	T	Tackles
B	Behinds	H	Handballs	M	Marks

Season	Team	No.	Games	Totals							Averages (per game)						
Season	Team	No.	Games	G	B	K	H	D	M	T	G	B	K	H	D	M	T
2013	Port Adelaide	32	16	11	6	90	57	147	24	56	0.7	0.4	5.6	3.6	9.2	1.5	3.5
2014	Port Adelaide	32	8	10	7	57	32	89	18	21	1.2	0.9	7.1	4.0	11.1	2.2	2.6
2015	Port Adelaide	3	10	9	3	59	63	122	23	38	0.9	0.3	5.9	6.3	12.2	2.3	3.8
2016	Port Adelaide	3	17	15	5	93	95	188	31	63	0.9	0.3	5.5	5.6	11.1	1.8	3.7
2017	Port Adelaide	3	7	6	1	51	55	106	18	30	0.9	0.1	7.3	7.9	15.1	2.6	4.3
2018	Port Adelaide	3	8	4	6	34	45	79	13	31	0.5	0.8	4.2	5.6	9.9	1.6	3.9
Career			66	55	28	384	347	731	127	239	0.8	0.4	5.8	5.3	11.1	1.9	3.6
