= Tendai Mzungu =

Australian rules footballer (born 1986)

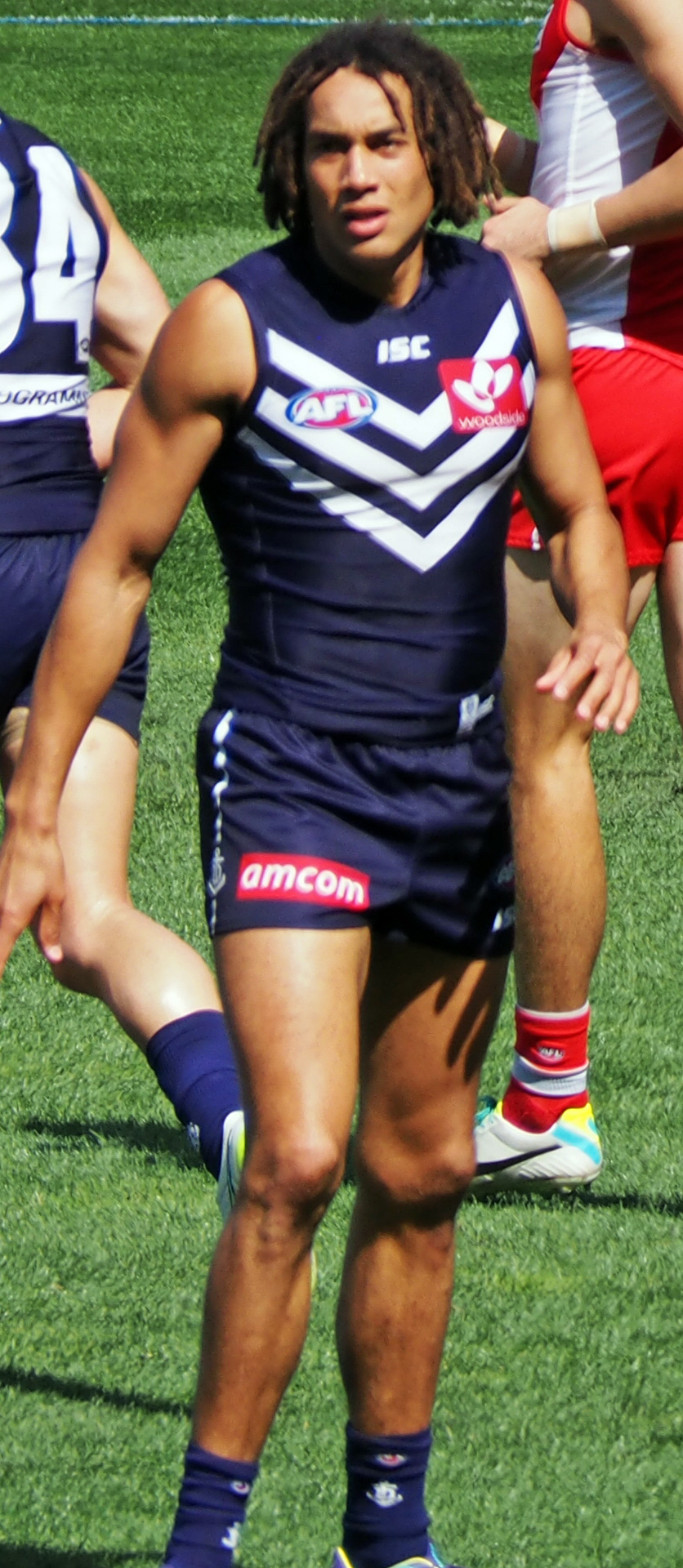
- Mzungu playing in 2015

Personal information
- Full name: Tendai Mzungu
- Born: 28 February 1986 (age 40); Melbourne, Victoria
- Original team: Trinity Aquinas (WAAFL)
- Height: 182 cm (6 ft 0 in)
- Weight: 84 kg (185 lb)
- Position: Utility

Playing career^{1}
Years	Club	Games (Goals)
2011–2016	Fremantle	102 (54)
2017	Greater Western Sydney	4 (1)
Total		106 (55)
- ^{1} Playing statistics correct to the end of 2017.

Career highlights
- Perth best and fairest 2010; Peel Thunder premiership side 2016; Fremantle Football Club first ever goal in a Grand Final 2013

Tendai Mzungu (born 28 February 1986) is a former Australian rules footballer who played for the Fremantle Football Club and Greater Western Sydney Giants in the Australian Football League (AFL). Mzungu represented the Perth Football Club in the West Australian Football League (WAFL) before being recruited to Fremantle at the end of the 2010 season, and made his debut for the club the following season.

== Career ==
Born in Melbourne to a Zimbabwean father and an Australian mother, Mzungu moved to Perth, Western Australia, at the age of nine. He attended Kent Street Senior High School, and played amateur football for the Trinity Aquinas Football Club. Falling into the Perth Football Club's recruitment zone in the WAFL, Mzungu made his senior debut for the club in 2006. He played 72 games over 5 years, winning the Butcher Medal Perth's best and fairest award in 2010, and polling 20 votes in the 2010 Sandover Medal.

The Fremantle Football Club obtained Mzungu in the trading period before the 2010 AFL draft, trading their 39th selection to the new Gold Coast club, in return for Mzungu and the 44th selection, after he was pre-listed by the Gold Coast as part of the new club's entry concessions. Fremantle had originally intended to rookie list him, but decided to obtain him via a trade after his good form in the 2010 WAFL season.

Mzungu performed well for Fremantle in the 2011 NAB Cup pre-season games and was tipped to replace the injured Roger Hayden in Fremantle's backline. However, in Fremantle's final pre-season game he damaged his knee medial ligament He returned to football 10 weeks later, to be selected directly to the AFL, rather than for Perth in the WAFL. His debut for Fremantle was in the Round 9 match at AAMI Stadium against Port Adelaide, which Fremantle won by 52 points. He was selected as the substitute player and only played the final quarter, replacing Hayden Ballantyne who suffered from a corked thigh (quadriceps contusion).

Tendai Mzungu played for Fremantle in the 2013 AFL Grand Final against Hawthorn, Fremantle's first ever Grand Final in their history. In the second quarter, Mzungu scored Fremantle's first goal of the game.

He was delisted at the conclusion of the 2016 season, however, he was drafted by Greater Western Sydney in the 2017 rookie draft. After playing four games for Greater Western Sydney, Mzungu announced his retirement following their preliminary final exit to the 2017 AFL season.

Mzungu has been Fremantle's team runner and inaugural Next Generation Academy coach since the 2018 AFL season.

== Statistics ==
Statistics are correct to the end of the 2016 season

Legend
G	Goals	K	Kicks	D	Disposals	T	Tackles
B	Behinds	H	Handballs	M	Marks

Season	Team	No.	Games	Totals							Averages (per game)						
Season	Team	No.	Games	G	B	K	H	D	M	T	G	B	K	H	D	M	T
2011	Fremantle	13	14	11	3	151	116	267	63	52	0.8	0.2	10.8	8.3	19.1	4.5	3.7
2012	Fremantle	13	24	13	13	266	143	409	85	103	0.5	0.5	11.1	6.0	17.0	3.5	4.3
2013	Fremantle	13	25	16	5	287	169	456	127	71	0.6	0.2	11.5	6.8	18.2	5.1	2.8
2014	Fremantle	13	23	12	9	276	149	425	106	71	0.5	0.4	12.0	6.5	18.5	4.6	3.1
2015	Fremantle	13	11	2	1	95	83	178	40	50	0.2	0.1	8.6	7.6	16.2	3.6	4.6
2016	Fremantle	13	5	0	1	38	38	76	14	15	0.0	0.2	7.6	7.6	15.2	2.8	3.0
Career			102	54	32	1113	698	1811	435	362	0.5	0.3	10.9	6.8	17.8	4.3	3.5
