= Hayden Ballantyne =

Australian rules footballer

Personal information
- Full name: Hayden Clarence Ballantyne
- Born: 16 July 1987 (age 39)
- Original team: Baldivis JFC
- Draft: No. 21, 2008 National Draft
- Debut: Round 13, 2009, Fremantle vs. Collingwood, at MCG
- Height: 175 cm (5 ft 9 in)
- Weight: 77 kg (170 lb)
- Position: Forward

Playing career^{1}
Years	Club	Games (Goals)
2009–2019	Fremantle	171 (254)

Representative team honours^{2}
Years	Team	Games (Goals)
2007–2008	WAFL	2 (3)

International team honours^{2}
2015	Australia	1 (1)
- ^{1} Playing statistics correct to the end of 2019.^{2} Representative statistics correct as of 2008.

Career highlights
- 2x Peel Thunder leading goalkicker: (2008), (2020); Peel Thunder best and fairest: (2008); Sandover Medal: (2008); AFL Goal of the Year: (2011); All-Australian Team: (2014); Fremantle leading goalkicker: (2014); Fremantle 25 since '95 Team; Fremantle Life Member: 2017

Hayden Clarence Ballantyne (born 16 July 1987) is a former Australian rules footballer who played for the Fremantle Football Club in the Australian Football League. He was a 2014 All Australian and has previously won a Sandover Medal while playing with Peel Thunder.

== Early career ==
Only 174 cm tall, Ballantyne started his career with Peel Thunder in the West Australian Football League in 2005 as a midfielder. In 2008, Ballantyne moved into the forward line with great success, kicking 75 goals to finish second in the Bernie Naylor Medal behind Subiaco's Brad Smith, and winning the Sandover Medal by 2 votes from Callum Chambers as the fairest and best player in the league. To recognise this achievement, Peel Thunder named the outer wing at Rushton Park the Hayden Ballantyne Wing in April 2009.

== AFL career ==
Ballantyne's success in the WAFL attracted the attention of AFL recruiters, and at the age of 21, he was drafted by the Fremantle Football Club with its second round selection in the 2008 AFL National Draft (pick No. 21 overall). Ballantyne risked being excluded from the draft when he missed the Western Australian state screening session due to being overseas on a holiday. He was later tested individually and allowed to remain nominated for the draft. Ballantyne was a mature-age draftee at the age of 21, with most draftees no older than 18.

Ballantyne won the 2011 AFL Goal of the Year in a play which saw him gather three possessions before goaling from 45 metres out.

In his role as a small forward, Ballantyne became noted for his ability to pester and annoy his opponents, and to often win free kicks by encouraging overzealous retaliation from them. In April 2012, the Herald Sun newspaper named him as the league's "chief pest" for his success in this aspect of the game, in the week after champion Geelong full-back Matthew Scarlett had received a three-week suspension for such a retaliatory punch (Ballantyne himself was suspended for two weeks for a separate incident in the same match). Ballantyne received some criticism following his lacklustre performance in the 2013 AFL Grand Final, which Fremantle lost by 15 points.

At the end of the 2017 season, Ballantyne signed a one-year contract extension. In August 2018, he signed a further one-year contract extension for the 2019 season. In August 2019 Ballantyne was informed that he would not be offered a contract extension for 2020.

== Post-AFL career ==
Ballantyne signed with Peel Thunder for the 2020 WAFL Season.

In January 2021 Ballantyne announced his retirement from the WAFL competition.

== Personal life ==
Ballantyne's father, Graeme Ballantyne is a horse trainer based at Lark Hill, Rockingham. The winner of the 2013 Perth Cup, Talent Show, is trained by Graeme and part owned by Hayden and his Fremantle teammate Nick Suban.

On 30 September 2018 Ballantyne's brother Brendan Ballantyne was struck by a pizza delivery car on Ennis Avenue in Waikiki and was killed. He was engaged to his fianceè, who was pregnant with their second child. He was 22.

== Statistics ==
Statistics are correct to the end of the 2019 season

Legend
G	Goals	K	Kicks	D	Disposals	T	Tackles
B	Behinds	H	Handballs	M	Marks

Season	Team	No.	Games	Totals							Averages (per game)						
Season	Team	No.	Games	G	B	K	H	D	M	T	G	B	K	H	D	M	T
2009	Fremantle	17	8	10	9	64	23	87	25	14	1.3	1.1	8.0	2.9	10.9	3.1	1.8
2010	Fremantle	1	19	33	17	180	85	265	64	62	1.7	0.9	9.5	4.5	13.9	3.4	3.3
2011	Fremantle	1	17	23	19	190	66	256	52	59	1.4	1.1	11.2	3.9	15.1	3.1	3.5
2012	Fremantle	1	21	31	17	236	81	317	58	79	1.5	0.8	11.2	3.9	15.1	2.8	3.8
2013	Fremantle	1	21	34	30	204	72	276	82	66	1.6	1.4	9.7	3.4	13.1	3.9	3.1
2014	Fremantle	1	20	49	26	194	49	243	86	54	2.5	1.3	9.7	2.5	12.2	4.3	2.7
2015	Fremantle	1	15	15	13	119	50	169	36	59	1.0	0.9	7.9	3.3	11.3	2.4	3.9
2016	Fremantle	1	20	26	17	159	84	243	64	60	1.3	0.8	8.0	4.2	12.2	3.2	3.0
2017	Fremantle	1	10	11	7	71	33	104	32	34	1.1	0.7	7.1	3.3	10.4	3.2	3.4
2018	Fremantle	1	17	21	14	127	60	187	57	37	1.2	0.8	7.5	3.5	11.0	3.4	2.2
2019	Fremantle	1	3	1	3	23	10	33	8	6	0.3	1.0	7.7	3.3	11.0	2.7	2.0
Career			171	254	172	1567	613	2180	564	530	1.49	1.01	9.16	3.58	12.74	3.3	3.1

== Honours and achievements ==
Team

- McClelland Trophy (Fremantle) 2015

Individual

WAFL

- 2x Peel Thunder leading goalkicker: (2008), (2020)
- Peel Thunder best and fairest: (2008)
- Sandover Medal: (2008)

AFL

- AFL Goal of the Year: (2011)
- All-Australian Team: (2014)
- Fremantle leading goalkicker: (2014)
- Fremantle 25 since '95 Team
- Fremantle Life Member: 2017
