= Colliwobbles =

1958-90 Grand Finals losing streak of the Collingwood Football Club

In the Australian Football League (AFL), the "Colliwobbles" (also known as the Pretenders) refers to the period between Collingwood's 1958 and 1990 premierships, where the Magpies reached nine AFL/VFL Grand Finals for eight losses and a draw in 1977.

This era was dubbed as the Colliwobbles partly because Collingwood sometimes lost by small margins; in this way, "Colliwobbles" is a specific term for choking when it is done by Collingwood.

The term was first coined by Lou Richards after Collingwood's loss against Carlton in the 1970 grand final by 10 points after having the biggest lead in AFL/VFL grand final history of 44 points at half-time. The term "Colliwobbles" was used since then not only referring to their loss against Carlton in 1970 but also any grand finals that Collingwood lost since 1958 (1960, 1964 and 1966). it is a play on the words "Collingwood" and "collywobbles" (a state of intestinal disorder, usually accompanied by a rumbling stomach).

The main period of the Colliwobbles ended in the 1990 AFL Grand Final, when Collingwood defeated Essendon to win their first premiership since 1958. Lou Richards ceremoniously announced the end of the Colliwobbles, and the club marked the occasion with the burial of a memoir of the hitherto trying times in front of a large crowd at Victoria Park.

After losing the 2018 grand final after leading most of the day, there was talk in the media that the Colliwobbles had returned.

Despite the supposed death of the Colliwobbles, 1958 remained Collingwood's last September premiership until 2023; the 1990 and 2010 premierships were won in October due to drawn finals (both involving Collingwood)—which, incidentally, are no longer possible, as extra time is invoked in case of a tied game for the grand final—and Collingwood have won only three (and drawn two) of the sixteen Grand Finals they have appeared in since their 1958 premiership, while losing eleven.

== Grand Final appearances during the main "Colliwobbles" period ==
Grand Final	Premier	Runner-up	Score	Margin	Venue	Attendance
1960	Melbourne	Collingwood	8.14 (62) – 2.2 (14)	48	MCG	97,457
1964	Melbourne	Collingwood	8.16 (64) – 8.12 (60)	4	MCG	102,469
1966	St Kilda	Collingwood	10.14 (74) – 10.13 (73)	1	MCG	101,655
1970	Carlton	Collingwood	17.9 (111) – 14.17 (101)	10	MCG	121,696
1977	North Melbourne	Collingwood	9.22 (76) – 10.16 (76)	0	MCG	108,244
1977	North Melbourne	Collingwood	21.25 (151) – 19.10 (124)	27	MCG	98,366
1979	Carlton	Collingwood	11.16 (82) – 11.11 (77)	5	MCG	113,545
1980	Richmond	Collingwood	23.21 (159) – 9.24 (78)	81	MCG	113,461
1981	Carlton	Collingwood	12.20 (92) – 10.12 (72)	20	MCG	112,964
1990	Collingwood	Essendon	13.11 (89) – 5.11 (41)	48	MCG	98,944

== Grand Final appearances since the main "Colliwobbles" period ==
Grand Final	Premier	Runner-up	Score	Margin	Venue	Attendance
2002	Brisbane Lions	Collingwood	10.15 (75) – 9.12 (66)	9	MCG	91,817
2003	Brisbane Lions	Collingwood	20.14 (134) – 12.12 (84)	50	MCG	79,451
2010	Collingwood	St Kilda	9.14 (68) – 10.8 (68)	0	MCG	100,016
2010	Collingwood	St Kilda	16.12 (108) – 7.10 (52)	56	MCG	93,853
2011	Geelong	Collingwood	18.11 (119) – 12.9 (81)	38	MCG	99,537
2018	West Coast Eagles	Collingwood	11.13 (79) – 11.8 (74)	5	MCG	100,022
2023	Collingwood	Brisbane Lions	12.18 (90) – 13.8 (86)	4	MCG	100,024

== Trivia and statistics since 1958 ==
- Five Collingwood Grand Finals have been lost by single-figure margins, and four by less than a goal, including a four-point loss in 1964 to Melbourne and a one-point loss in 1966 to St Kilda, which remains the Saints' only premiership as of 2026, and a five-point loss in 1979 to Carlton and 2018 to West Coast.
- Collingwood suffered its worst Grand Final loss in history in 1980, losing to Richmond by 81 points, which, at the time, was also the worst in VFL history, and also lost by 50 points to Brisbane in 2003.
- The highest Collingwood grand final attendance was 121,696 in 1970 against Carlton (which also remains a league record for any VFL/AFL game). The lowest Collingwood grand final attendance since 1958 was 79,451 in 2003 against Brisbane due to renovation works at the MCG.
- Collingwood's highest grand final score was 19.10 (124) in the 1977 replay against North Melbourne. Its lowest was 2.2 (14) against Melbourne in 1960.
- The lowest score conceded by Collingwood was 5.11 (41) in 1990 against Essendon. The highest score conceded was 23.21 (159) in 1980 against Richmond.
- Collingwood's 2023 AFL Grand Final win was its first in September since 1958.

== See also ==
- Sports-related curses
- Kennett curse
- Essendon Football Club supplements saga
