= Lee Spurr =

Australian rules footballer

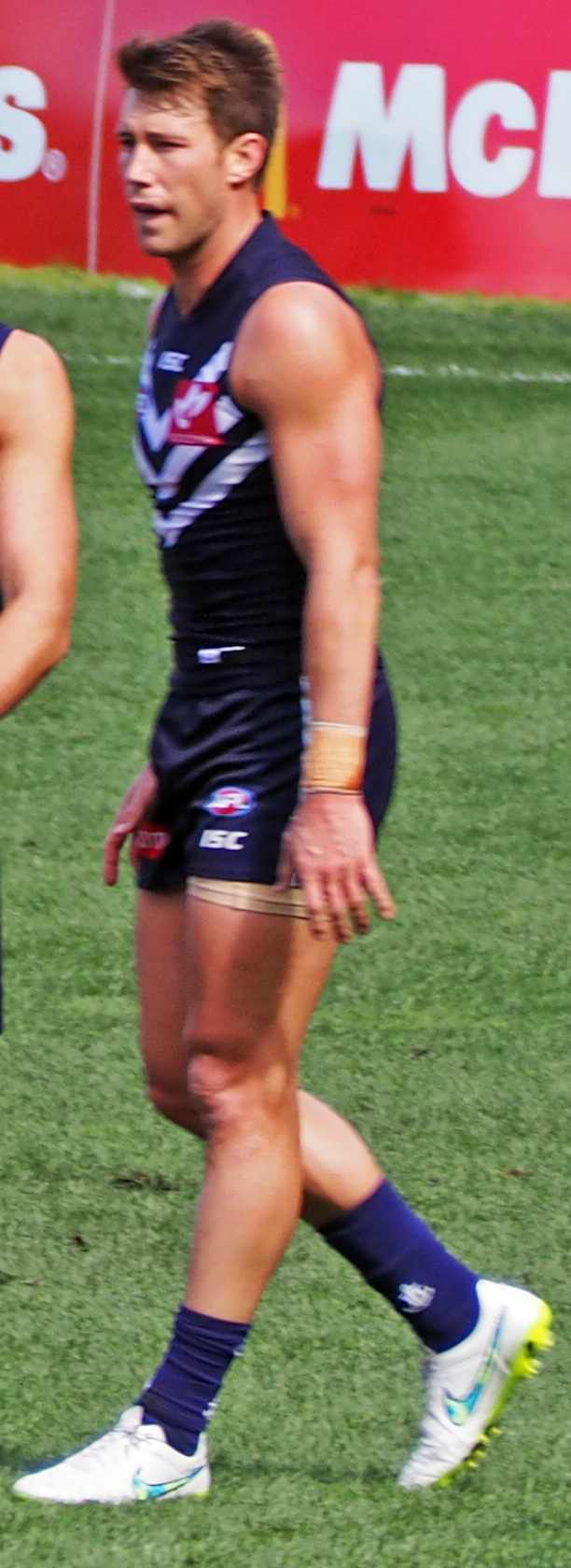
- Spurr playing for Fremantle in 2015

Personal information
- Full name: Lee Spurr
- Born: 27 July 1987 (age 39)
- Original team: Central District (SANFL)
- Draft: No. 8, 2012 Rookie Draft, Fremantle
- Height: 182 cm (6 ft 0 in)
- Weight: 81 kg (179 lb)
- Position: Defender

Playing career^{1}
Years	Club	Games (Goals)
2012–2018	Fremantle	120 (5)
- ^{1} Playing statistics correct to the end of 2018.

Lee Spurr (born 27 July 1987) is a former Australian rules footballer who played for the Fremantle Football Club in the Australian Football League (AFL). He an experienced utility player who played in two premierships for Central District in the South Australian National Football League (SANFL).

Originally from Morningside in Queensland, Spurr played 66 games for Central District in the South Australian National Football League (SANFL) between 2007 and 2011, winning premierships in 2009 and 2010.

Spurr was drafted to Fremantle with the eighth selection in the 2012 Rookie Draft. After playing well in games for Peel Thunder in the West Australian Football League (WAFL), Spurr was elevated to the senior playing list prior to round 5 after Josh Mellington was placed on the long-term injury list. He then made his debut in round 6 of the 2012 AFL season against Gold Coast at Metricon Stadium as the substitute. He was activated during the third quarter, replacing Stephen Hill who had injured his leg in the first half.

In 2013, Spurr was a member of Fremantle's Grand Final team. He spent four years as a member of Fremantle's leadership group from 2014 to 2017.

After missing the entire 2018 season with a persistent knee injury, Spurr retired from AFL football in August 2018. He played 120 games for Fremantle between 2012 and 2017.
