= Nick Suban =

Australian rules footballer

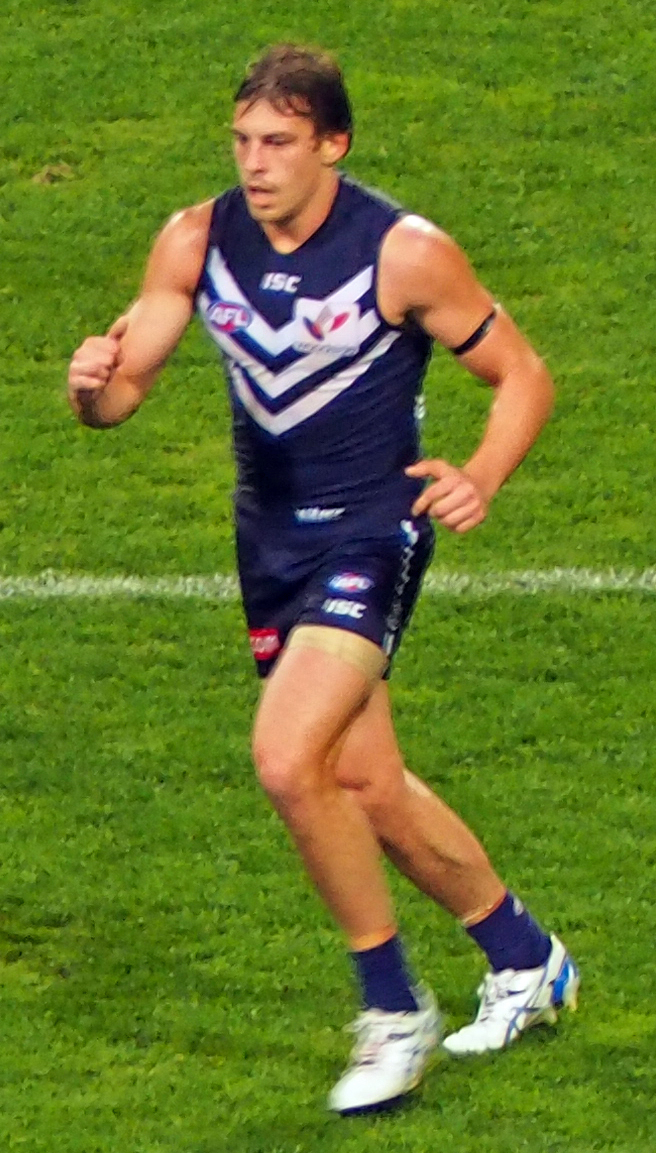
- Nick Suban, May 2014

Personal information
- Full name: Nicholas Suban
- Born: 9 May 1990 (age 36)
- Original teams: North Ballarat Rebels, TAC Cup
- Height: 182 cm (6 ft 0 in)
- Weight: 81 kg (179 lb)
- Position: Midfielder

Playing career^{1}
Years	Club	Games (Goals)
2009–2017	Fremantle	156 (60)
- ^{1} Playing statistics correct to the end of 2017.

Career highlights
- Claremont Premiership player 2012; Peel Thunder Premiership Player 2016, 2017; South Fremantle Premiership Player 2020; 2008 Victoria Country captain (National U18); 2009 AFL Rising Star nominee; Fremantle Life Member: 2017

Nicholas Suban (born 9 May 1990) is a former professional Australian rules footballer who played for the Fremantle Football Club in the Australian Football League.

Originally from Bacchus Marsh, Victoria and of Slovenian origin, Suban captained both the North Ballarat Rebels in the TAC Cup and Victoria Country in the 2008 AFL Under 18 Championships. He was named in both the Under 18 All-Australian Team and the TAC Cup Team of the Year in both 2007 and 2008. Suban was drafted by Fremantle with the 24th selection in the 2008 AFL draft.

Suban is only the second player to wear the number 8 guernsey for Fremantle, following the retirement of inaugural squad member Shaun McManus in 2008. Along with fellow new recruit Stephen Hill, Suban made his debut in the opening round of the 2009 AFL season, and both played all 22 games for the season. In Round 21, Suban was one of Fremantle's best players in their 54-point win over Essendon. His career-high 25 possession and two goal game earnt him an AFL Rising Star nomination.

In April 2010, Suban extended his contract until the end of the 2012 season. After playing 25 consecutive games from his debut in 2009, Suban missed his first game in Round 4 of the 2010 season due to an ankle injury suffered in the final minutes of Fremantle's win over Geelong at Subiaco Oval. He returned in round 9 and played 13 more games for the year. In round 4 of the 2011 season against North Melbourne at Subiaco Oval, Suban fractured his right fibula when his leg was trapped under teammate Ryan Crowley. He missed over three months of football before returning to play in the Western Derby in Round 18.

Suban had a disappointing 2012 season, being tried in a variety of positions in his 14 games, often as the substitute player. In 2013, however, he moved to play more in the midfield, and played in 22 games, including the 2013 AFL Grand Final. He played his 100th game for Fremantle in a surprise loss to bottom placed St Kilda in round 18 of the 2014 season.

He was delisted by Fremantle at the conclusion of the 2017 season.

== Honours and achievements ==
Team

- McClelland Trophy (Fremantle) 2015
- 4x WAFL Premiership Player (Claremont) 2012 (Peel Thunder) 2016 2017 (South Fremantle) 2020

Individual

- 2009 AFL Rising Star nominee
- Fremantle Life Member: 2017

== Statistics ==
Statistics are correct to the end of the 2017 season

Legend
G	Goals	K	Kicks	D	Disposals	T	Tackles
B	Behinds	H	Handballs	M	Marks

Season	Team	No.	Games	Totals							Averages (per game)						
Season	Team	No.	Games	G	B	K	H	D	M	T	G	B	K	H	D	M	T
2009	Fremantle	8	22	10	12	191	84	275	56	65	0.4	0.6	8.7	3.8	12.5	2.6	3.0
2010	Fremantle	8	16	3	3	139	71	210	40	67	0.2	0.2	8.7	4.4	13.1	2.5	4.2
2011	Fremantle	8	10	2	2	93	40	133	22	33	0.2	0.2	9.3	4.0	13.3	2.2	3.3
2012	Fremantle	8	14	3	2	111	38	149	26	38	0.2	0.1	7.9	2.7	10.6	1.9	2.7
2013	Fremantle	8	22	16	11	223	106	329	67	78	0.7	0.5	10.1	4.8	15.0	3.0	3.6
2014	Fremantle	8	21	11	9	174	109	283	42	81	0.5	0.4	8.3	5.2	13.5	2.0	3.9
2015	Fremantle	8	24	7	14	231	103	334	51	93	0.3	0.6	9.6	4.3	13.9	2.1	3.9
2016	Fremantle	8	15	4	5	113	83	196	27	74	0.3	0.3	7.5	5.5	13.1	1.8	4.9
2017	Fremantle	8	12	4	0	90	79	169	36	65	0.3	0.0	7.5	6.6	14.1	3.0	5.4
Career			156	60	58	1365	713	2078	367	594	0.4	0.4	8.8	4.6	13.3	2.4	3.8
