= Kennett curse =

Superstition in Australian rules football

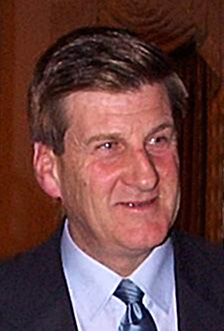
Hawthorn club president Jeff Kennett, after whom the losing streak was named.

The Kennett curse was the name given to Australian Football League club Geelong's dominance against rival Hawthorn in the period between Hawthorn's upset win against Geelong in the 2008 AFL Grand Final and Hawthorn's win in the 2013 preliminary finals.

== Background ==
Geelong and Hawthorn contested the 2008 AFL Grand Final. Geelong went into the match as the favourites; they were the defending premiers, and had lost only one match for the entire season; however, Hawthorn prevailed by 26 points to claim its 10th premiership. Ahead of the teams' first-round meeting at the start of the 2009 season, then-Hawthorn president Jeff Kennett publicly questioned Geelong's mental drive to defeat Hawthorn.

What they don't have, I think, is the quality of some of our players; they don't have the psychological drive we have. We've beaten Geelong when it matters.

— Jeff Kennett

Additionally, following the upset Grand Final loss, Geelong players made a private pact, which was later made public by Paul Chapman, to never again lose to Hawthorn. Following Kennett's comments, Geelong won the match in Round 1, 2009, and proceeded to defeat Hawthorn in eleven successive matches: a run that included a number of close games and come-from-behind victories that seemed to highlight the existence of the so-called 'curse'. During this 11-game run, Geelong won two premierships, one in 2009, and another in 2011, which included a 31-point qualifying final win over Hawthorn. Kennett's demeaning comments in 2009 came to be seen as the initiating event of a curse on Hawthorn, dubbed by fans and media as the "Kennett curse". Kennett himself (who stepped down from the Hawthorn presidency in 2011, later taking the position again in 2017) said in 2013 that while he was not proud of what he had said, he did not wish he could take it back. The curse ended with Hawthorn finally defeating Geelong by 5 points in the thrilling 2013 First Preliminary Final, after Kennett's reign as Hawthorn president had ended. Hawthorn then went on to win the Grand Final the following week. Coincidentally, Paul Chapman, the player who first mentioned the Geelong players 'pact' to never lose to Hawthorn, played his last game for Geelong a week before the Hawthorn game, having missed the Preliminary Final due to suspension.

== Results ==
Over the period of the curse, the rivalry between the clubs remained strong. All matches were played at the Melbourne Cricket Ground, drew at least 63,000 spectators, and although Geelong won all eleven matches, most matches were close and/or involved one team coming from a long way behind. Nine of the eleven matches were decided by ten points or less, and five by less than a goal (six points), with two decided by kicks after the final siren: Round 17, 2009, with a behind to Jimmy Bartel; and Round 19, 2012, with a goal to Tom Hawkins. The Cats' 11-match winning streak against the Hawks is the longest by any team following a VFL/AFL Grand Final loss to their opponent.

#	Round/Year	Winner	Score	Widest Margin	Winning Margin	Venue	Attendance
1	Round 1, 2009	Geelong	15.21 (111) – 16.7 (103)	Geelong by 43	8	Melbourne Cricket Ground	69,593
2	Round 17, 2009	Geelong	15.9 (99) – 14.14 (98)	Hawthorn by 28	1	Melbourne Cricket Ground	64,803
3	Round 2, 2010	Geelong	14.16 (100) – 13.13 (91)	Hawthorn by 24	9	Melbourne Cricket Ground	68,628
4	Round 15, 2010	Geelong	12.13 (85) – 11.17 (83)	Hawthorn by 13	2	Melbourne Cricket Ground	69,220
5	Round 5, 2011	Geelong	17.15 (117) – 15.8 (98)	Hawthorn by 26	19	Melbourne Cricket Ground	78,579
6	Round 12, 2011	Geelong	13.10 (88) – 13.5 (83)	Geelong by 20	5	Melbourne Cricket Ground	63,476
7	Qualifying Final, 2011	Geelong	14.14 (98) – 9.13 (67)	Geelong by 37	31	Melbourne Cricket Ground	73,400
8	Round 2, 2012	Geelong	14.8 (92) – 13.12 (90)	Hawthorn by 18	2	Melbourne Cricket Ground	69,231
9	Round 19, 2012	Geelong	18.10 (118) – 17.14 (116)	Geelong by 51	2	Melbourne Cricket Ground	65,287
10	Round 1, 2013	Geelong	13.15 (93) – 12.14 (86)	Hawthorn by 30	7	Melbourne Cricket Ground	76,300
11	Round 15, 2013	Geelong	11.16 (82) – 10.12 (72)	Geelong by 33	10	Melbourne Cricket Ground	85,197

Source: Footy Wire

The losing streak ended as follows:

#	Round/Year	Winner	Score	Widest Margin	Winning Margin	Venue	Attendance
12	Preliminary Finals, 2013	Hawthorn	14.18 (102) – 15.7 (97)	Geelong by 20	5	Melbourne Cricket Ground	85,569

The curse looked to continue, with Geelong leading by 19 points midway through the final quarter, but Hawthorn rallied and kicked three goals and seven behinds to Geelong's solitary point to overrun the Cats by 5 points. Paul Chapman, who earlier had publicised the Geelong players' pact never to lose to Hawthorn, missed the preliminary final due to suspension. He was then traded to Essendon at the end of the season.

== Aftermath ==
The rivalry still produces exciting games and routinely draws crowds of 63,000+ to each game (the COVID-19 pandemic notwithstanding). The following year, Geelong beat the Hawks by 19 points in Round 5 but then were blown out in their Qualifying Final to the Hawks two weeks after losing to the Hawks by 23. Those were the first half of four straight Hawthorn wins through 2015. The Cats did win their most recent finals meeting, a preliminary final, in 2025 by 30 points. During the home-and-away games since 2016, Geelong has had an overall edge, with Geelong's five wins to Hawthorn's three, including the last three wins.

=== Easter Monday match ===
The Hawks and Cats have contested an annual match on Easter Monday since 2010.

Year	Round	Winner	Score	Venue	Attendance
2010	Round 2	Geelong by 9 points	14.16 (100) – 13.13 (91)	Melbourne Cricket Ground	68,628
2011	Round 5	Geelong by 9 points	17.15 (117) – 15.8 (98)	Melbourne Cricket Ground	78,579
2012	Round 2	Geelong by 2 points	14.8 (92) – 13.12 (90)	Melbourne Cricket Ground	69,231
2013	Round 1	Geelong by 7 points	13.15 (93) – 12.14 (86)	Melbourne Cricket Ground	76,300
2014	Round 5	Geelong by 19 points	15.16 (106) – 12.15 (87)	Melbourne Cricket Ground	80,222
2015	Round 1	Hawthorn by 62 points	17.21 (123) – 8.13 (61)	Melbourne Cricket Ground	73,584
2016	Round 1	Geelong by 30 points	18.8 (116) – 12.14 (86)	Melbourne Cricket Ground	74,218
2017	Round 4	Geelong by 86 points	20.14 (134) – 6.12 (48)	Melbourne Cricket Ground	62,360
2018	Round 2	Hawthorn by 1 point	17.16 (118) – 18.9 (117)	Melbourne Cricket Ground	73,189
2019	Round 5	Geelong by 23 points	17.11 (113) – 13.12 (90)	Melbourne Cricket Ground	66,347
2021	Round 3	Geelong by 5 points	10.9 (69) – 9.10 (64)	Melbourne Cricket Ground	50,030
2022	Round 5	Hawthorn by 12 points	14.8 (92) – 11.14 (80)	Melbourne Cricket Ground	48,030
2023	Round 4	Geelong by 82 points	19.13 (127) – 6.9 (45)	Melbourne Cricket Ground	65,335
2024	Round 3	Geelong by 36 points	17.4 (106) – 10.10 (70)	Melbourne Cricket Ground	67,020
2025	Round 6	Geelong by 7 points	12.14 (86) – 11.13 (79)	Melbourne Cricket Ground	88,746
2026	Round 4	Hawthorn by 1 point	13.14 (92) – 14.7 (91)	Melbourne Cricket Ground	84,712

== See also ==
- Sports-related curses
- Colliwobbles
