= Doig Medal =

Football award

The Doig Medal is the best and fairest award given out to the player considered best and fairest during a season for the Fremantle Football Club in the AFL.

It was renamed in 2000 after the legendary Fremantle footballing family, the Doigs, who have had over 17 members play league football for East Fremantle or South Fremantle in the WAFL. The most famous is George Doig who has been inducted in the Australian Football Hall of Fame.

Eight different players won the award between 1995 and 2002 until Peter Bell won his second medal in 2003. Following Bell's third medal in 2004, Matthew Pavlich won four consecutive medals to hold the record of six medals in total. Nat Fyfe became the third player to win multiple Doig medals when he won consecutive medals in 2013 and 2014.

The voting system as of the 2017 AFL season, consists of five coaches giving each player a ranking from zero to five after each match. Players can receive a maximum of 25 votes for a game.

== Recipients ==
^	Denotes current player
+	Player won Brownlow Medal in same season

Season	Winner	Runner up	Third	Fourth	Fifth	Ref.
1995	Peter Mann	Dale Kickett	Ben Allan	Scott Chisholm	Stephen O'Reilly	
1996	Stephen O'Reilly	Dale Kickett	Scott Chisholm	Peter Mann	Craig Callaghan	
1997	Dale Kickett	Shane Parker	Craig Callaghan	Andrew Wills	Greg Harding	
1998	Jason Norrish	Adrian Fletcher	Craig Callaghan	Chris Bond	Shane Parker	
1999	Adrian Fletcher	Tony Modra	Daniel Bandy	Dale Kickett	Clive Waterhouse	
2000	Troy Cook	Paul Hasleby	Clive Waterhouse	Daniel Bandy	Adrian Fletcher	
2001	Peter Bell	Heath Black	Matthew Carr	Matthew Pavlich	Troy Cook	
2002	Matthew Pavlich	Peter Bell	Shane Parker	Paul Hasleby	Troy Simmonds	
2003	Peter Bell (2)	Matthew Pavlich	Paul Hasleby	Robbie Haddrill	Shaun McManus	
2004	Peter Bell (3)	Paul Hasleby	Matthew Pavlich	Justin Longmuir	Luke McPharlin	
2005	Matthew Pavlich (2)	Peter Bell		Heath Black	Paul Hasleby	
2005	Matthew Pavlich (2)	Shane Parker		Heath Black	Paul Hasleby	
2006	Matthew Pavlich (3)	Peter Bell		Shane Parker	Josh Carr	
2006	Matthew Pavlich (3)	Michael Johnson		Shane Parker	Josh Carr	
2007	Matthew Pavlich (4)	Antoni Grover	Luke McPharlin	Peter Bell		
2007	Matthew Pavlich (4)	Antoni Grover	Luke McPharlin	Josh Carr		
2007	Matthew Pavlich (4)	Antoni Grover	Luke McPharlin	Roger Hayden		
2007	Matthew Pavlich (4)	Antoni Grover	Luke McPharlin	Dean Solomon		
2008	Matthew Pavlich (5)	Aaron Sandilands	Luke McPharlin	Rhys Palmer	Michael Johnson	
2009	Aaron Sandilands	Matthew Pavlich	Chris Tarrant	Paul Duffield	Paul Hasleby	
2009	Aaron Sandilands	Matthew Pavlich	Chris Tarrant	Paul Duffield	David Mundy	
2010	David Mundy	Aaron Sandilands	Matthew Pavlich	Stephen Hill	Greg Broughton	
2011	Matthew Pavlich (6)	Nat Fyfe	Greg Broughton	Luke McPharlin	David Mundy	
2012	Ryan Crowley	Chris Mayne	Michael Johnson	Matthew Pavlich	Luke McPharlin	
2013	Nat Fyfe	David Mundy	Michael Johnson	Ryan Crowley	Lee Spurr	
2014	Nat Fyfe (2)	Aaron Sandilands	Stephen Hill	David Mundy	Hayden Ballantyne	
2015	Aaron Sandilands (2)	David Mundy	Stephen Hill	Nat Fyfe+	Michael Walters	
2016	Lachie Neale	Stephen Hill	Michael Walters	Matthew Pavlich	Lee Spurr	
2017	Bradley Hill	Lachie Neale	Nat Fyfe	David Mundy	Michael Walters	
2018	Lachie Neale (2)	David Mundy	Nat Fyfe	Ed Langdon	Luke Ryan^	
2019	Nat Fyfe+ (3)	Michael Walters	Bradley Hill	David Mundy	Ed Langdon	
2020	Luke Ryan^	Nat Fyfe	Adam Cerra	Andrew Brayshaw^	David Mundy	
2021	Sean Darcy^	David Mundy	Andrew Brayshaw^	Caleb Serong^	Adam Cerra	
2022	Andrew Brayshaw^	Brennan Cox^	Caleb Serong^		Lachie Schultz	
2022	Andrew Brayshaw^	Brennan Cox^	Alex Pearce^		Lachie Schultz	
2023	Caleb Serong^	Andrew Brayshaw^	Luke Ryan^	Luke Jackson^	Hayden Young^	
2024	Caleb Serong^ (2)	Andrew Brayshaw^	Hayden Young^	Josh Treacy^	Sam Switkowski	
2024	Caleb Serong^ (2)	Andrew Brayshaw^	Hayden Young^	Josh Treacy^	Jordan Clark^	
2025	Caleb Serong^ (3)	Andrew Brayshaw^	Josh Treacy^	Luke Jackson^	Jordan Clark^	
2026	Luke Jackson^	Andrew Brayshaw^	Caleb Serong^	Josh Treacy^	Shai Bolton^	

== Multiple winners ==
^	Denotes current player

Player	Medals	Seasons
Matthew Pavlich	6	2002, 2005, 2006, 2007, 2008, 2011
Peter Bell	3	2001, 2003, 2004
Nat Fyfe	3	2013, 2014, 2019
Caleb Serong^	3	2023, 2024, 2025
Aaron Sandilands	2	2009, 2015
Lachie Neale	2	2016, 2018

== See also ==
- Fremantle fairest and best (AFL Women's)
