= 2010 Fremantle Football Club season =

Fremantle Football Club
2010 season
- President: Steve Harris
- Coach: Mark Harvey
- Captain: Matthew Pavlich
- Home ground: Subiaco Oval
- Pre-season competition: Semi finals
- AFL season: 6th
- Finals series: Semi finals
- Best and Fairest: David Mundy
- Leading goalkicker: Matthew Pavlich (61)
- Highest home attendance: 42,719 vs. Hawthorn (Elimination Final) (4 September 2010)
- Lowest home attendance: 30,976 vs. Adelaide (28 March 2010)
- Average home attendance: 36,574 (home and away)

The 2010 Fremantle Football Club season was the club's 16th season of competition in the Australian Football League (AFL). The club reached the finals for the third time and won its first ever Elimination Final, beating Hawthorn at Subiaco Oval before losing to Geelong at the MCG to end the season.

== Personnel changes ==
Fremantle was not a major participant in the trade period, with no recruits and only fringe players Brett Peake and Marcus Drum traded for late third round selections. In the draft, however, Fremantle would recruit two significant members of its future midfield in Nathan Fyfe and Michael Barlow, as well as the injury prone Anthony Morabito. Adam McPhee returned to the club via the pre-season draft after spending the seven previous seasons with Essendon.

Dean Solomon retired during the pre-season due to a recurrence of a past knee injury. Scott Thornton announced his retirement mid year after breaking his leg whilst playing for South Fremantle. Paul Hasleby declared prior to the final home and away game that he would retire at the end of the season.

Off-field, Rick Hart stepped down as president at the end of the 2009 season, with Steve Harris his successor. Ben Allen was reappointed as the member's elected representative, and inaugural Docker Stephen O'Reilly and Jenn Morris, a dual Olympic gold medalist with the Hockeyroos, appointed to the board.

During the season

=== Additions ===
Traded to Fremantle:

- None

2009 National draft:

- Anthony Morabito (Peel Thunder, #4)
- Nathan Fyfe (Claremont, #20)
- Joel Houghton (Perth, #36)
- Jesse Crichton (North Launceston, #48)
- Dylan Roberton (Dandenong Stingrays, #49)
- Justin Bollenhagen (South Adelaide, #52)

Pre-season draft

- Adam McPhee (Essendon, #3)

Rookie draft:

- Michael Barlow (Werribee, #8)
- Alex Silvagni (Casey Scorpions, #24)

Rookie elevation:

- Greg Broughton

=== Departures ===
Retired

- Andrew Browne
- Dean Solomon

Delisted:

- Adam Campbell
- Andrew Foster
- Daniel Gilmore
- Josh Head
- Luke Pratt (rookie)
- Brent Connelly (rookie)

Traded away:

- Brett Peake to St Kilda for selection 48
- Marcus Drum to Geelong for selection 49

== Ladder ==
2010 AFL ladder
Pos	Team	Pld	W	L	D	PF	PA	PP	Pts	
1	Collingwood (P)	22	17	4	1	2349	1658	141.7	70	Finals series
2	Geelong	22	17	5	0	2518	1702	147.9	68	Finals series
3	St Kilda	22	15	6	1	1935	1591	121.6	62	Finals series
4	Western Bulldogs	22	14	8	0	2174	1734	125.4	56	Finals series
5	Sydney	22	13	9	0	2017	1863	108.3	52	Finals series
6	Fremantle	22	13	9	0	2168	2087	103.9	52	Finals series
7	Hawthorn	22	12	9	1	2044	1847	110.7	50	Finals series
8	Carlton	22	11	11	0	2143	1983	108.1	44	Finals series
9	North Melbourne	22	11	11	0	1930	2208	87.4	44	
10	Port Adelaide	22	10	12	0	1749	2123	82.4	40	
11	Adelaide	22	9	13	0	1763	1870	94.3	36	
12	Melbourne	22	8	13	1	1863	1971	94.5	34	
13	Brisbane Lions	22	7	15	0	1775	2158	82.3	28	
14	Essendon	22	7	15	0	1930	2402	80.3	28	
15	Richmond	22	6	16	0	1714	2348	73.0	24	
16	West Coast	22	4	18	0	1773	2300	77.1	16	

Source: AFL ladder
Rules for classification: 1) points; 2) percentage; 3) number of points for.
(P) Premiers

== 2010 results ==
=== NAB Cup ===
	First round
Sunday, 21 February 5:40pm	Fremantle 1.13.10 (97)	def.	Melbourne 2.4.8 (50)	Subiaco Oval (crowd: 11,031)	Report

	Quarter-finals
Sunday 28 February 5:10pm	North Melbourne 0.13.12 (90)	def. by	Fremantle 1.12.13 (94)	Etihad Stadium (crowd: 7,877)	Report

	Semi-finals
Saturday 6 March 7:10pm	St Kilda 2.15.7 (115)	def.	Fremantle 2.3.9 (45)	Etihad Stadium (crowd: 5,241)

=== Premiership season ===
	Round 1
Sunday, 28 March (5:10pm)	Fremantle 17.16 (118)	def.	Adelaide 9.8 (62)	Subiaco Oval (crowd: 30,976)	Report

	Round 2
Sunday, 4 April (2:10pm)	Essendon 9.15 (69)	def. by	Fremantle 17.11 (113)	Etihad Stadium (crowd: 29,651)	Report

	Round 3
Sunday, 11 April (2:40pm)	Fremantle 18.17 (125)	def.	Geelong 17.16 (118)	Subiaco Oval (crowd: 38,762)	Report

	Round 4
Sunday, 18 April (4:40pm)	St Kilda 16.12 (102)	def.	Fremantle 14.9 (93)	Etihad Stadium (crowd: 29,841)	Report

	Round 5
Sunday, 25 April (6:40pm)	Fremantle 15.22 (112)	def.	Richmond 11.7 (73)	Subiaco Oval (crowd: 38,010)	Report

	Round 6
Sunday, 2 May (2:40pm)	West Coast 10.13 (73)	def. by	Fremantle 17.9 (111)	Subiaco Oval (crowd: 40,886)	Report

	Round 7
Saturday, 8 May (7:10pm)	Brisbane Lions 15.10 (100)	def. by	Fremantle 15.23 (113)	Gabba (crowd: 27,739)	Report

	Round 8
Friday, 14 May (6:40pm)	Fremantle 15.7 (97)	def. by	Collingwood 20.13 (133)	Subiaco Oval (crowd: 41,624)	Report

	Round 9
Saturday, 22 May (2:10pm)	Sydney 9.9 (63)	def. by	Fremantle 14.16 (100)	SCG (crowd: 24,819)	Report

	Round 10
Sunday, 30 May (2:40pm)	Fremantle 21.13 (139)	def.	North Melbourne 11.12 (78)	Subiaco Oval (crowd: 36,175)	Report

	Round 11
Saturday, 5 June (2:40pm)	Adelaide 16.9 (105)	def.	Fremantle 12.10 (82)	AAMI Stadium (crowd: 35,605)	Report

	Round 12
Sunday, 13 June (2:40pm)	Fremantle 10.7 (67)	def. by	St Kilda 12.13 (85)	Subiaco Oval (crowd: 37,569)	Report

	Round 13
Saturday, 20 June (7:10pm)	Carlton 12.15 (87)	def. by	Fremantle 14.12 (96)	Etihad Stadium (crowd: 28,869)	Report

	Round 14
Saturday, 3 July (1:10pm)	Fremantle 17.13 (115)	def.	Port Adelaide 8.10 (58)	Subiaco Oval (crowd: 32,442)	Report

	Round 15
Saturday, 10 July (7:10pm)	Richmond 15.10 (100)	def.	Fremantle 11.15 (81)	Etihad Stadium (crowd: 25,707)	Report

	Round 16
Sunday, 18 July (2:40pm)	Fremantle 11.16 (82)	def.	Melbourne 10.11 (71)	Subiaco Oval (crowd: 32,816)	Report

	Round 17
Sunday, 25 July (1:10pm)	Western Bulldogs 24.14 (158)	def.	Fremantle 12.4 (76)	Etihad Stadium (crowd: 26,797)	Report

	Round 18
Sunday, 1 August (2:40pm)	Fremantle 24.16 (160)	def.	West Coast 13.7 (85)	Subiaco Oval (crowd: 40,451)	Report

	Round 19
Saturday, 7 August (2:10pm)	North Melbourne 19.9 (123)	def.	Fremantle 10.9 (69)	Etihad Stadium (crowd: 14,891)	Report

	Round 20
Saturday, 14 August (1:10pm)	Fremantle 13.9 (87)	def. by	Sydney 14.12 (96)	Subiaco Oval (crowd: 34,087)	Report

	Round 21
Saturday, 21 August (2:10pm)	Hawthorn 24.11 (155)	def.	Fremantle 5.9 (39)	Aurora Stadium (crowd: 15,532)	Report

	Round 22
Friday, 26 August (6.40pm)	Fremantle 13.15 (93)	def.	Carlton 13.9 (87)	Subiaco Oval (crowd: 39,376)	Report

=== Finals ===
	Elimination Final
Saturday, 4 September (1:20pm)	Fremantle 14.10 (94)	def.	Hawthorn 8.16 (64)	Subiaco Oval (crowd: 42,719)	Report

	Semi-Final
Friday, 10 September (7:45pm)	Geelong 20.15 (135)	def.	Fremantle 10.6 (66)	MCG (crowd: 45,056)	Report

== Awards, records and milestones ==
Aaron Sandilands was named as the lead ruckman in the 2010 All-Australian team, his third selection. Matthew Pavlich was considered unlucky to have not been selected for his seventh All-Australia team. Michael Barlow was awarded the Ross Glendinning Medal in Round 6, with Sandilands winning it in Round 18. Barlow, despite only playing 13 games for the season due to suffering a broken leg in Round 14, was also awarded the Best First Year Player Award by the AFL Players Association awards.

Nathan Fyfe and Anthony Morabito both received nominations in the 2010 AFL Rising Star award, Fyfe in Fremantle's round 9 win over Sydney and Morabito in the final round against Carlton.

Garrick Ibbotson and Paul Duffield were chosen to represent Australia in the 2010 International Rules series in Ireland.

=== Club awards ===
David Mundy won his first Doig Medal, awarded at a function at the Burswood Entertainment Complex on 3 October. Votes were awarded to each player by the coaches after each game.

- Doig Medal: David Mundy, 190 votes
- 2nd: Aaron Sandilands, 171 votes
- 3rd: Matthew Pavlich, 160 votes
- 4th Stephen Hill, 137 votes
- 5th: Greg Broughton, 116 votes
- 6th: Hayden Ballantyne, 103 votes
- 7th: Michael Barlow, 97 votes
- 8th: Luke McPharlin, 80 votes
- 9th: Roger Hayden, 78 votes
- 10th: Chris Tarrant, 76 votes
- Best Clubman: Matt de Boer
- Beacon Award: Michael Barlow

=== Milestones ===
- Round 5 - Paul Duffield (50 AFL games)
- Round 11 - Steven Dodd (100 AFL games)
- Round 13 - Paul Hasleby (200 AFL games)
- Round 13 - Garrick Ibbotson (50 AFL games)
- Round 15 - Aaron Sandilands (150 AFL games)
- Round 18 - Luke McPharlin (150 Fremantle games)
- Round 21 - Michael Johnson (100 AFL games)

=== Debuts ===
Name	Age at debut	Debut round	Opponent	Games (2010)	Goals (2010)
Anthony Morabito	18 years, 150 days	Round 1	Adelaide	23	13
Michael Barlow	22 years, 100 days	Round 1	Adelaide	13	15
Alex Silvagni	22 years, 185 days	Round 1	Adelaide	15	4
Nathan Fyfe	18 years, 219 days	Round 5	Richmond	18	14
Dylan Roberton	18 years, 315 days	Round 6	West Coast	13	2
Jesse Crichton	19 years, 37 days	Round 17	Western Bulldogs	6	2
Justin Bollenhagen	18 years, 227 days	Round 18	West Coast	3	3
