= 2017 Fremantle Football Club season =

Fremantle Football Club
2017 season
- Coach: Ross Lyon (6th season)
- Captains: Nat Fyfe (1st season)
- Home ground: Domain Stadium (Capacity: 43,500)
- AFL season: 14th

The 2017 Fremantle Football Club season was the 23rd season in the Australian Football League contested by the Fremantle Football Club.

== List changes ==
=== Retirements and delistings ===
Player	Date	Reason	Career games	Career goals	Ref.
Matthew Pavlich	26 July 2016	Retired (Note: Effective at the end of the season)	353	700	
Sean Hurley	30 August 2016	Delisted	0	0	
Tanner Smith	2 September 2016	Delisted	4	2	
Anthony Morabito	6 September 2016	Delisted	26	14	
Matt de Boer	4 October 2016	Delisted	138	48	
Josh Deluca	4 October 2016	Delisted	4	2	
Brady Grey	4 October 2016	Delisted	17	10	
Jack Hannath	4 October 2016	Delisted	20	8	
Tendai Mzungu	4 October 2016	Delisted	102	54	
Clancee Pearce	4 October 2016	Delisted	100	36	
Michael Barlow	24 October 2016	Delisted	126	81	
Alex Silvagni	26 October 2016	Delisted	53	10	

=== Free agency ===
Player	Date	Free agent type	New club	Compensation	Ref.
Chris Mayne	12 October 2016	Unrestricted	Collingwood	2nd round	

=== Trades ===
Date	Gained	From	Lost	Ref.
11 October 2016	Cam McCarthy; Pick 7 Pick 34; Pick 72	Greater Western Sydney	Pick 3	
13 October 2016	Bradley Hill	Hawthorn	Pick 23	
18 October 2016	Joel Hamling; Pick 40; Pick 63	Western Bulldogs	Pick 35; Pick 43; Pick 61	
20 October 2016	Shane Kersten	Geelong	Pick 63	
20 October 2016	Pick 35; Pick 71; 2017 fourth round pick (Gold Coast)	Gold Coast	Pick 73; 2017 second round pick (Fremantle)	

=== National draft ===
Round	Pick	Player	Recruited from	League
1	8	Griffin Logue	Swan Districts	WAFL
2	38	Sean Darcy	Geelong Falcons	TAC Cup
2	41	Brennan Cox	Woodville-West Torrens	SANFL
4	66	Luke Ryan	Coburg	VFL

=== Rookie draft ===
Round	Pick	Player	Recruited from	League
1	3	Taylin Duman	Oakleigh Chargers	TAC Cup
2	21	Luke Strnadica	East Fremantle	WAFL
3	38	Brady Grey	Fremantle	AFL
4	50	Josh Deluca	Fremantle	AFL

== Squad ==
Fremantle Football Club
Senior list		Rookie list	Coaching Staff
1 Hayden Ballantyne; 2 Griffin Logue; 3 Zac Dawson; 4 Sean Darcy; 5 Garrick Ibbotson; 6 Danyle Pearce; 7 Nat Fyfe (c); 8 Nick Suban; 9 Bradley Hill; 10 Michael Walters; 11 Tom Sheridan; 12 Jonathon Griffin; 13 Harley Bennell; 14 Lachie Weller; 15 Ethan Hughes; 16 David Mundy; 17 Hayden Crozier; 18 Darcy Tucker; 19 Connor Blakely	20 Matt Taberner; 21 Joel Hamling; 22 Shane Kersten; 23 Cam McCarthy; 24 Harley Balic; 25 Alex Pearce; 26 Ed Langdon; 27 Lachie Neale; 30 Zac Clarke; 31 Aaron Sandilands; 32 Stephen Hill; 33 Cameron Sutcliffe; 34 Lee Spurr; 35 Michael Apeness; 36 Brennan Cox; 37 Michael Johnson; 38 Luke Ryan; 40 Sam Collins; 41 Shane Yarran (ret)	28 Brady Grey; 39 Josh Deluca; 42 Matt Uebergang; 43 Ryan Nyhuis; 44 Taylin Duman; 45 Luke Strnadica	Head coach: Ross Lyon; Assistant coaches: Michael Prior (defensive coach); Mark Stone (stoppages and training coordinator); Anthony Rock (midfield coach); Simon Eastaugh (midfield coach); David Hale (forwards coach); Marc Webb (senior development coach); Roger Hayden (development coach); Brent Guerra (development coach); Tom Morris (high performance manager); Legend: (c) Captain(s); (vc) Vice-captain(s); Long-term injury list; Upgraded rookie; (ret) Retired; Updated: 22 June 2017; Source(s): Playing list,, 2016 coaching structure

== Season summary ==
=== Pre-season ===
**Game**	**Date and local time**	**Opponent**	**Scores** (Fremantle's scores indicated in **bold**)			**Venue**	**Attendance**	**Ref.**
**Game**	**Date and local time**	**Opponent**	Home	Away	Result	**Venue**	**Attendance**	**Ref.**
1	Saturday, 25 February (3:40 pm)	West Coast	0.16.11 (107)	**0.8.4 (52)**	Lost by 55 points	Wonthella Oval, Geraldton (A)	8,800	
2	Saturday, 4 March (1:40 pm)	Collingwood	**1.11.12 (87)**	1.12.4 (85)	Won by 2 points	Rushton Park (H)	5,500	
3	Friday, 10 March (5:40 pm)	Carlton	**2.12.14 (104)**	0.12.11 (83)	Won by 21 points	Domain Stadium (H)	5,337	

=== Home and Away season ===
**Rd**	**Date and local time**	**Opponent**	**Scores** (Fremantle's scores indicated in **bold**)			**Venue**	**Attendance**	**Ref.**
**Rd**	**Date and local time**	**Opponent**	Home	Away	Result	**Venue**	**Attendance**	**Ref.**
1	Sunday, 26 March (4:40 pm)	Geelong	**10.13 (73)**	18.7 (115)	Lost by 42 points	Domain Stadium (H)	34,638	
2	Sunday, 2 April (4:10 pm)	Port Adelaide	22.13 (145)	**8.8 (56)**	Lost by 89 points	Adelaide Oval (A)	38,388	
3	Saturday, 8 April (5:40 pm)	Western Bulldogs	**13.11 (89)**	10.13 (73)	Won by 16 points	Domain Stadium (H)	28,865	
4	Saturday, 15 April (1:40 pm)	Melbourne	15.14 (104)	**16.10 (106)**	Won by 2 points	MCG (A)	27,829	
5	Saturday, 22 April (5:40 pm)	North Melbourne	**9.13 (67)**	9.8 (62)	Won by 5 points	Domain Stadium (H)	33,319	
6	Saturday, 29 April (6:10 pm)	West Coast	16.7 (103)	**9.8 (62)**	Lost by 41 points	Domain Stadium (A)	40,836	
7	Sunday, 7 May (2:40 pm)	Essendon	**17.14 (116)**	11.13 (79)	Won by 37 points	Domain Stadium (H)	33,393	
8	Sunday, 14 May (1:10 pm)	Richmond	10.10 (70)	**10.12 (72)**	Won by 2 points	MCG (A)	31,200	
9	Sunday, 21 May (2:40 pm)	Carlton	**13.8 (86)**	7.9 (51)	Won by 35 points	Domain Stadium (H)	30,313	
10	Saturday, 27 May (7:10 pm)	Adelaide	20.23 (143)	**6.7 (43)**	Lost by 100 points	Adelaide Oval (A)	42,415	
11	Sunday, 4 June (2:40 pm)	Collingwood	**12.13 (85)**	15.15 (105)	Lost by 20 points	Domain Stadium (H)	34,259	
12	Saturday, 10 June (4:35 pm)	Brisbane Lions	18.13 (121)	**9.10 (64)**	Lost by 57 points	Gabba (A)	11,742	
13	Bye							
14	Sunday, 25 June (1:10 pm)	Geelong	10.14 (74)	**11.6 (72)**	Lost by 2 points	Simonds Stadium (A)	29,928	
15	Sunday, 2 July (2:40 pm)	St Kilda	**12.8 (80)**	12.17 (89)	Lost by 9 points	Domain Stadium (H)	30,541	
16	Sunday, 9 July (1:10 pm)	North Melbourne	12.10 (82)	**13.8 (86)**	Won by 4 points	Etihad Stadium (A)	19,267	
17	Sunday, 16 July (2:40 pm)	West Coast	**5.14 (44)**	11.8 (74)	Lost by 30 points	Domain Stadium (H)	38,722	
18	Saturday, 22 July (5:40 pm)	Hawthorn	**7.6 (48)**	15.10 (100)	Lost by 52 points	Domain Stadium (H)	30,818	
19	Saturday, 29 July (2:10 pm)	Greater Western Sydney	13.20 (98)	**13.8 (86)**	Lost by 12 points	Spotless Stadium (A)	11,233	
20	Saturday, 5 August (5:40 pm)	Gold Coast	**12.18 (90)**	10.7 (67)	Won by 23 points	Domain Stadium (H)	27,050	
21	Saturday, 12 August (1:45 pm)	Sydney	22.11 (143)	**5.9 (39)**	Lost by 104 points	SCG (A)	39,281	
22	Sunday, 20 August (2:40 pm)	Richmond	**7.9 (51)**	25.5 (155)	Lost by 104 points	Domain Stadium (H)	34,204	
23	Sunday, 27 August (1:10 pm)	Essendon	16.11 (107)	**14.8 (92)**	Lost by 15 points	Etihad Stadium (A)	42,665	

=== Ladder ===
Pos	Team	Pld	W	L	D	PF	PA	PP	Pts	Qualification
1	Adelaide	22	15	6	1	2415	1776	136.0	62	2017 finals
2	Geelong	22	15	6	1	2134	1818	117.4	62	2017 finals
3	Richmond (P)	22	15	7	0	1992	1684	118.3	60	2017 finals
4	Greater Western Sydney	22	14	6	2	2081	1812	114.8	60	2017 finals
5	Port Adelaide	22	14	8	0	2168	1671	129.7	56	2017 finals
6	Sydney	22	14	8	0	2093	1651	126.8	56	2017 finals
7	Essendon	22	12	10	0	2135	2004	106.5	48	2017 finals
8	West Coast	22	12	10	0	1964	1858	105.7	48	2017 finals
9	Melbourne	22	12	10	0	2035	1934	105.2	48	
10	Western Bulldogs	22	11	11	0	1857	1913	97.1	44	
11	St Kilda	22	11	11	0	1925	1986	96.9	44	
12	Hawthorn	22	10	11	1	1864	2055	90.7	42	
13	Collingwood	22	9	12	1	1944	1963	99.0	38	
**14**	Fremantle	**22**	**8**	**14**	**0**	**1607**	**2160**	**74.4**	32	
15	North Melbourne	22	6	16	0	1983	2264	87.6	24	
16	Carlton	22	6	16	0	1594	2038	78.2	24	
17	Gold Coast	22	6	16	0	1756	2311	76.0	24	
18	Brisbane Lions	22	5	17	0	1877	2526	74.3	20	

Source: AFL
Rules for classification: 1) points; 2) percentage; 3) number of points for.
(P) Premiers
