= 2018 Fremantle Football Club season =

Australian rules football club season

The 2018 Fremantle Football Club season was the 24th season contested by the Fremantle Football Club in the Australian Football League. It was also the 2nd season in the AFL Women's league.

== AFL ==
=== List changes ===
Before the 2017 season had begun, Shane Yarran retired due to dramas outside of football. Though he did not play in the 2017 season, he still took up a spot on their list throughout 2017. At the season's end veterans Zac Dawson and Garrick Ibbotson decided to retire from professional football. Neither was consistently playing in the senior team and both finished their careers playing for Peel Thunder in the WAFL. After the season had finished Fremantle announced that they would be delisting five players, including 100-gamer Zac Clarke and former Adelaide player Jonathon Griffin. Nick Suban who had been awarded life membership at the 2017 Doig Medal event, was also delisted after nine years at the club.

During the 2017 trade period, Fremantle were active in a number of trades, but gaining and losing players and major draft picks. Both Hayden Crozier and Harley Balic were traded, to Western Bulldogs and Melbourne respectively, in exchange for draft picks which improved Fremantle's position in the 2017 draft. Fremantle made an effort to bring defender Nathan Wilson to the club from Greater Western Sydney. Initially the Giants wanted a top-20 draft pick for him, but on the last day of the draft period Fremantle were able to secure him by exchanging lower draft picks and giving the Giants one of their future draft picks. Fremantle also pulled off one of the biggest trades of the off-season when they were able to gain pick 2 in the 2017 draft from Gold Coast in exchange for Lachie Weller, while also making another trade with the Suns to bring Brandon Matera to the club.

==== Retirements and delistings ====
Player	Date	Reason	Career games	Career goals	Ref.
Shane Yarran	19 December 2016	Retired (Note: Effective immediately)	6	10	
Zac Dawson	17 August 2017	Retired (Note: Effective at the end of the 2017 season)	166	7	
Garrick Ibbotson	22 August 2017	Retired	177	22	
Zac Clarke	6 October 2017	Delisted	101	46	
Jonathon Griffin	6 October 2017	Delisted	97	36	
Sam Collins	6 October 2017	Delisted	14	0	
Josh Deluca	6 October 2017	Delisted	4	2	
Matthew Uebergang	6 October 2017	Delisted	0	0	
Nick Suban	27 October 2017	Delisted	156	60	

==== Trades ====
Date	Gained	From	Lost	Ref.
13 October 2017	Pick 40; Pick 82	Western Bulldogs	Hayden Crozier; 2018 fourth round pick (Fremantle)	
18 October 2017	Pick 66	Melbourne	Harley Balic	
19 October 2017	Nathan Wilson; Pick 71	Greater Western Sydney	Pick 57; 2018 second round pick (Fremantle)	
19 October 2017	Pick 2	Gold Coast	Lachie Weller; Pick 41	
19 October 2017	Brandon Matera	Gold Coast	2018 third round pick (Fremantle)	

==== National draft ====
Round	Pick	Player	Recruited from	League
1	2	Andrew Brayshaw	Sandringham Dragons	TAC Cup
1	5	Adam Cerra	Eastern Ranges	TAC Cup
3	44	Hugh Dixon	Tigers	TSL
4	59	Mitch Crowden	Sturt	SANFL
4	65	Tom North	Eastern Ranges	TAC Cup
4	69	Lloyd Meek	Greater Western Victoria Rebels	TAC Cup
5	73	Sam Switkowski	Box Hill	VFL
5	75	Scott Jones	East Perth	WAFL

==== Rookie elevation ====
- Brady Grey

==== Rookie draft ====
Round	Pick	Player	Recruited from	League
1	5	Bailey Banfield	Claremont	WAFL
2	21	Stefan Giro	Norwood	SANFL

=== Squad ===
Fremantle Football Club
Senior list		Rookie list	Coaching Staff
1 Hayden Ballantyne; 2 Griffin Logue; 3 Brandon Matera; 4 Sean Darcy; 5 Adam Cerra; 6 Danyle Pearce; 7 Nat Fyfe (c); 8 Andrew Brayshaw; 9 Bradley Hill; 10 Michael Walters; 11 Tom Sheridan; 12 Mitch Crowden; 13 Harley Bennell; 14 Nathan Wilson; 15 Ethan Hughes; 16 David Mundy; 17 Hugh Dixon; 18 Darcy Tucker; 19 Connor Blakely; 20 Matt Taberner	21 Joel Hamling; 22 Shane Kersten; 23 Cam McCarthy; 24 Tom North; 25 Alex Pearce; 26 Ed Langdon; 27 Lachie Neale; 28 Brady Grey; 30 Lloyd Meek; 31 Aaron Sandilands; 32 Stephen Hill; 33 Cameron Sutcliffe; 34 Lee Spurr; 35 Michael Apeness; 36 Brennan Cox; 37 Michael Johnson; 38 Luke Ryan; 39 Sam Switkowski; 40 Scott Jones	41 Bailey Banfield; 42 Stefan Giro; 43 Ryan Nyhuis; 44 Taylin Duman; 45 Luke Strnadica	Head coach: Ross Lyon; Assistant coaches: Michael Prior (Defensive coach); Anthony Rock (Midfield coach); Simon Eastaugh (Midfield coach); David Hale (Forwards coach); Marc Webb (Head of player development); Brent Guerra (Forwards development coach); Roger Hayden (Defence development coach); Adam Read (Midfield development coach); Tom Morris (High performance manager); Legend: (c) Captain(s); (vc) Vice-captain(s); Updated: 6 December 2017; Source(s): Senior list, Rookie list, Coaching staff

=== Ladder ===
Pos	Team	Pld	W	L	D	PF	PA	PP	Pts	Qualification
1	Richmond	22	18	4	0	2143	1574	136.1	72	2018 finals
2	West Coast (P)	22	16	6	0	2012	1657	121.4	64	2018 finals
3	Collingwood	22	15	7	0	2046	1699	120.4	60	2018 finals
4	Hawthorn	22	15	7	0	1972	1642	120.1	60	2018 finals
5	Melbourne	22	14	8	0	2299	1749	131.4	56	2018 finals
6	Sydney	22	14	8	0	1822	1664	109.5	56	2018 finals
7	Greater Western Sydney	22	13	8	1	1898	1661	114.3	54	2018 finals
8	Geelong	22	13	9	0	2045	1554	131.6	52	2018 finals
9	North Melbourne	22	12	10	0	1950	1790	108.9	48	
10	Port Adelaide	22	12	10	0	1780	1654	107.6	48	
11	Essendon	22	12	10	0	1932	1838	105.1	48	
12	Adelaide	22	12	10	0	1941	1865	104.1	48	
13	Western Bulldogs	22	8	14	0	1575	2037	77.3	32	
14	Fremantle	22	8	14	0	1556	2041	76.2	32	
15	Brisbane Lions	22	5	17	0	1825	2049	89.1	20	
16	St Kilda	22	4	17	1	1606	2125	75.6	18	
17	Gold Coast	22	4	18	0	1308	2182	59.9	16	
18	Carlton	22	2	20	0	1353	2282	59.3	8	

Source: AFL
Rules for classification: 1) points; 2) percentage; 3) number of points for.
(P) Premiers
