= Fremantle Football Club Life Members =

The following is a list of all the Fremantle Football Club life members, this includes players, coaches and administration. Each individual inducted has served the Fremantle Football Club for a long duration of time. With people inducted each year, players need to reach 150 senior AFL games to be eligible for the Life Member induction.

== Life members ==
Year Inducted	Member	Position	Year of Service
1999	Ross Kelly	Chairman	1994–1998
2003	Shane Parker	Player	1995–2007
2004	Shaun McManus	Player	1995–2008
2006	Matthew Pavlich	Player	2000–2016
2007	Paul Hasleby	Player	2000–2010
2007	James Walker	Player	1998–2007
2007	Troy Cook	Player	2000–2007
2007	Peter Bell	Player	1995, 2001 - 2008
2009	Antoni Grover	Player	2001–2012
2009	Rick Hart	President	2002–2009
2010	Luke McPharlin	Player	2002–2015
2010	Aaron Sandilands	Player	2003–2019
2012	David Mundy	Player	2005–2022
2013	Michael Johnson	Player	2005–2018
2013	Ryan Crowley	Player	2005–2015
2013	Jeffery Boyle	Physiotherapist	1995–present
2013	Ken Withers	Doctor	1995–present
2014	Ben Allan	Player/Administrator	1995–2015
2014	Paul Duffield	Player	2006–2015
2015	Garrick Ibbotson	Player	2005–2017
2015	Chris Mayne	Player	2008–2016
2015	Stephen Hill	Player	2009–2021
2017	Hayden Ballantyne	Player	2009–2019
2017	Nick Suban	Player	2009–2017
2017	Syd Corser	Administrator	1994–2003
2018	Nat Fyfe	Player	2010–2025
2019	Michael Walters	Player	2009–2025
2019	Steve Harris	President	2009–2016
2020	Dale Kickett	Player	1995–2002
2020	Roger Hayden	Player/Administrator/Coach	2002–2011
2021	Stephen O'Reilly	Player/Administrator	1995–1999, 2009–2019
2022	Chris Bond	Player/Administrator	1998–1999, 2007–2018
2022	Tony Godden	Player/Administrator	1996–1998, 2005–present
2023	Peter Mann	Player/Administrator	1995–1998, 2013-2023
2023	Gary Ingraham	Trainer	1998–present
2023	Kara Antonio	Player	2017–2021
2023	Hayley Miller	Player	2017–present
2024	Gabby O'Sullivan	Player	2017–present
2024	Luke Ryan	Player	2016–present
2024	Kellie Black	Administrator	2004–present
2024	Graeme Parker	Administrator	2005–2021
2025	Andrew Brayshaw	Player	2018–present
2025	Luke Morfesse	Communications	2009–present
2025	Paul Salis	Property manager	2013–present
2025	Dale Alcock	President	2011–2023
2025	Kiara Bowers	Player	2017–present
2025	Ebony Antonio	Player	2017–2025
2025	Laura Pugh	Player	2019–present
2026	Richard Walley	Patron	2013–
2026	Alex Pearce	Player	2015–present
2026	Brennan Cox	Player	2017–present
2026	Marshall Stockden	Physiotherapist	2005–present
2026	Caleb Serong	Player	2020–present
