= Shaun McManus =

Australian rules footballer (born 1976)

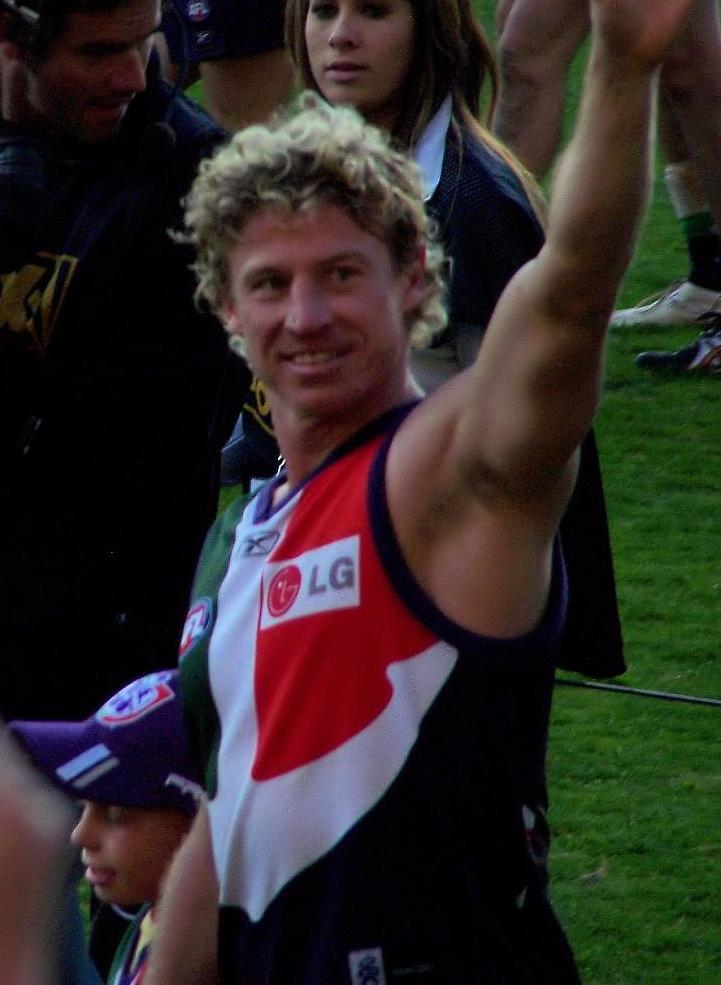
- McManus in August 2008

Personal information
- Full name: Shaun John McManus
- Born: 9 February 1976 (age 50)
- Original team: East Fremantle (WAFL)
- Height: 181 cm (5 ft 11 in)
- Weight: 81 kg (179 lb)

Playing career^{1}
Years	Club	Games (Goals)
1993–2008	East Fremantle	48 (14)
1995–2008	Fremantle	228 (95)
Total		276 (109)
- ^{1} Playing statistics correct to the end of 2008.

Career highlights
- Larke Medal 1993; East Fremantle premiership side 1994; AFL Rising Star nominee 1995; Fremantle co-captain 2000–2001; Fremantle 25 since ‘95 Team; Fremantle Life Member: 2004; 35 career Brownlow votes; WA State of Origin selection 1995

Shaun John McManus (born 9 February 1976) is a former Australian rules footballer. He is one of the most popular players to ever represent the Fremantle Football Club in the Australian Football League (AFL) and is often seen as an icon or favourite son of the club. He has been described as the AFL's uphill skiing champion due to his courage, persistence and resilience in overcoming two knee reconstructions.

He was the co-captain of Fremantle in 2000 and 2001, the second player to reach 200 games with the club, and his 228 games was the second most games played for Fremantle behind Shane Parker at the time of his retirement. Following the retirement of Peter Bell during the 2008 season, McManus became the last remaining player from Fremantle's inaugural squad to still be playing in the AFL.

== Early career ==
McManus was a highly rated junior player who won the Larke Medal as the best player at the 1993 National Under-17 AFL Youth Championships. He represented Western Australia, alongside future teammates Peter Bell, Jeff Farmer and Troy Cook. He then won a premiership with East Fremantle in the WAFL in 1994, before being selected by Fremantle into their initial squad as a pre-draft selection prior to the 1994 AFL draft.

== Introduction to the AFL ==
McManus made his debut in Round 5 of the 1995 AFL season and played all 18 remaining games for the year. He continued his good form into 1996 and, despite missing 6 games with ankle injuries, finished 10th in the Fremantle Best and Fairest award.

In Round 3, 1997, he suffered a knee injury in the season's first Western Derby and required a full reconstruction. He returned for the start of the 1998 AFL season, but in the Round 6 clash against Port Adelaide he suffered a recurrence of the injury and required a second reconstruction.

== Return from injury ==
He returned again in 1999 and played all but five games over the next six seasons. In 2000, his leadership qualities were recognised when he was awarded the co-captaincy of the club alongside Adrian Fletcher. During the Round 4 2001 Western Derby McManus displayed one of the most courageous acts seen in a derby when he ran back with the flight of the ball to take a mark, only to collide heavily with David Wirrpanda. His resilience was displayed when he continued to play after the collision and kicked the goal from the resulting free kick. He played his 100th game for Fremantle in the second last game of 2001, becoming only the fifth player to do so.

In 2005, however, his form fell away and he struggled for selection. Amid calls for his retirement or delisting, he played on and had one of his best ever seasons in 2006, playing all 22 home and away games and all three finals. In 2007, he was one of only five Fremantle players to play in all 22 matches. Despite this, the calls for retirement continued, especially as it became clear that Fremantle's 2008 season would not result in reaching the finals series. He even denied the rumours early in the season before announcing that his final game of AFL football would be in the Round 18 Western Derby at Subiaco Oval.

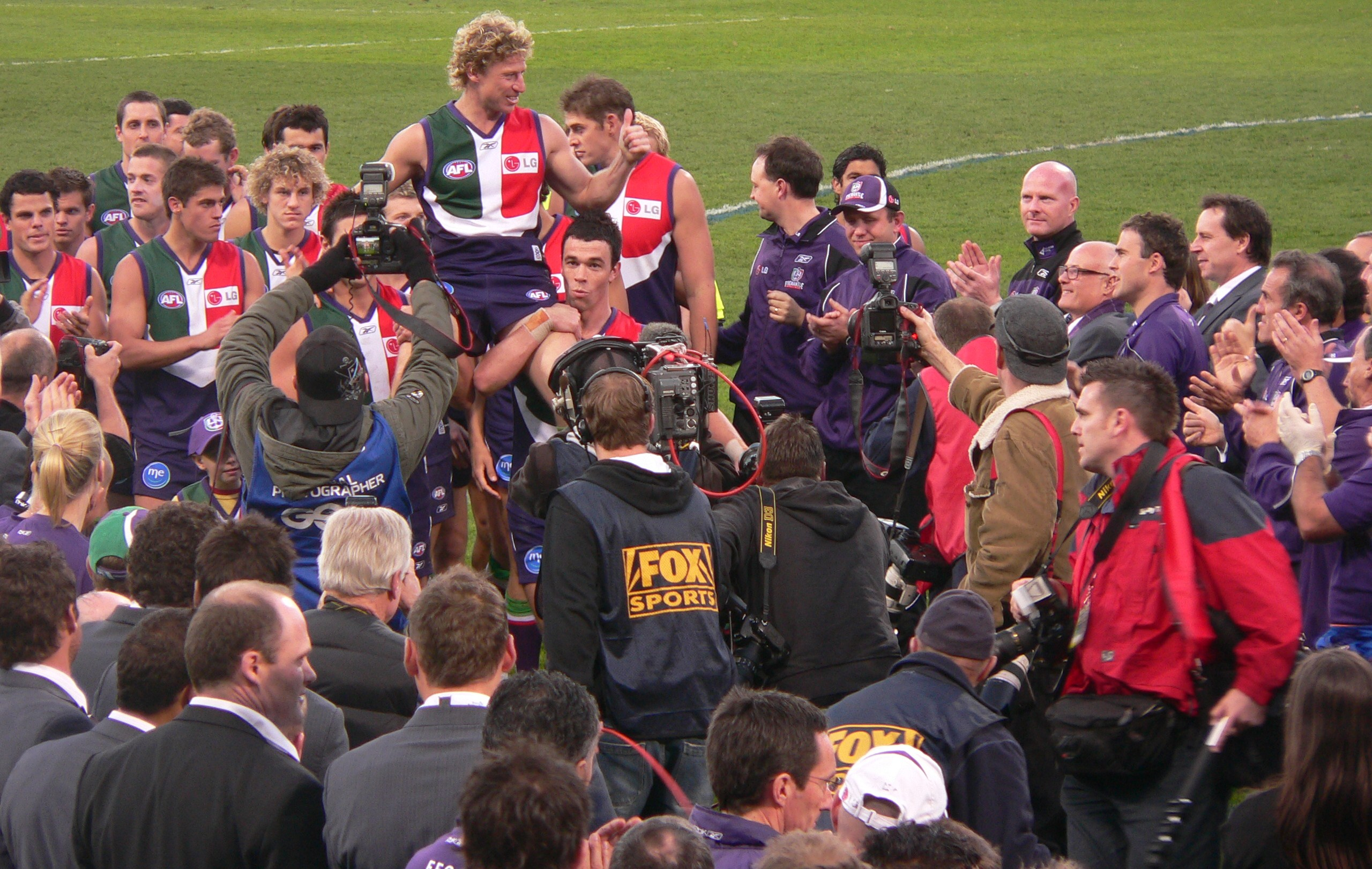
McManus being chaired from the ground after his final match

McManus played his final game of football on 3 August 2008 against the West Coast Eagles at Subiaco Oval, in which the Dockers won by 33 points. McManus received many tributes before and after the match and celebrated the closure of his career with a lap of honour around the oval before he was chaired from the ground by Matthew Pavlich and Ryan Crowley through an honour guard of past and present Fremantle players.

== Family connections ==
The McManus family is well known in Fremantle: comedian Rove McManus, inaugural Fremantle coach Gerard Neesham, Order of Australia recipient Sam Kerr and West Coast's Daniel Kerr are his cousins; he is also related to Con Regan and Melbourne Cup–winning jockey J. J. Miller, and he attended Corpus Christi College in Bateman, Western Australia.

== Post-football career ==
At the end of the 2008 season, McManus accepted a part-time role as player development coach. He was the second 2008 retiree to join the Dockers football department, with Luke Webster being appointed as a player development manager. McManus is also the coach of the East Fremantle Junior Football Club, who won the year-10 premiership in 2017.

In 2009, McManus joined the on-air personalities Nathan & Nat for breakfast on Perth radio station Nova 93.7, replacing cricketer Ryan Campbell. He also is the weekend sports newsreader on Nine News in Perth.

He currently works as a commentator for Channel 7's coverage of Australian Football League (AFL) matches in Western Australia.
