= Heath Black =

Australian rules footballer, born 1979

Personal information
- Full name: Heath Black
- Born: 28 May 1979 (age 47)
- Original team: Oakleigh U18
- Height: 176 cm (5 ft 9 in)
- Weight: 82 kg (181 lb)

Playing career^{1}
| Years | Club | Games (Goals) |
| 1997 – 2001 | Fremantle | 69 (31) |
| 2002 – 2004 | St Kilda | 54 (19) |
| 2005 – 2008 | Fremantle | 69 (30) |
| Total | | 192 (80) |
- ^{1} Playing statistics correct to the end of 2008.

Career highlights
- AFL Rising Star nominee: 1997; Pre Season Premiership 2004

Heath Black (born 28 May 1979) is a former Australian rules footballer who played for Fremantle and St Kilda in the Australian Football League (AFL).

== Football career ==
Noted for his speed and long left foot kicking, Black was recruited with the 12th selection in the 1996 AFL draft and began his career with Fremantle in 1997. When not selected to play for Fremantle in the AFL he played for South Fremantle in the West Australian Football League (WAFL) and was a member of their 1997 WAFL Premiership winning side.

After spending five seasons at the Dockers, and after finishing second in the Doig Medal (best and fairest) in 2001, he was traded to St Kilda during the 2001 AFL trade period, in return for pick # 17. This draft pick was then used to recruit Jeff Farmer from Melbourne.

He was a vital part of the Saints' midfield during his relatively brief time there, and at the end of 2003 requested to be released so he could go back to Perth. However, the Saints lodged the trade request after the deadline and Black stayed on with St Kilda for another season. At the end of 2004 he was eventually traded back to the club which he began his career at.

In 2005, Black was one of the few consistent players in a mediocre season for Fremantle. He finished fourth behind Peter Bell, Shane Parker and Matthew Pavlich, in the count for the club's best and fairest award, the Doig Medal. He also represented Australia in the 2005 International Rules series against Ireland.

On 6 August 2008, Heath Black announced his retirement from the AFL due to a combination of hip and shoulder injuries.

== Controversies ==
In February 2006, it was rumoured that Black would take part in a publicity stunt similar to the Garry Hocking "Whiskas" incident in 1998, in that Black would change his name to Heath Purple. Whilst Hocking's name change only lasted for a week, Black's would have lasted for the entire 2006 AFL season as part of a promotion with Ribena. However, Black was involved in a fight at the Perth Cup on New Year Day 2006 and subsequently charged with assault occasioning bodily harm, obstructing police and assaulting a female police officer The name change promotion did not eventuate. In June 2006 Black pleaded guilty to all charges and was fined $5000.

Between 2007 and 2009 Black was charged in numerous alcohol related driving and violence offences. He revealed in October 2009 that he suffered from anxiety and depression.

In 2012 he released his autobiography titled Black, co-written with Lisa Holland-McNair, where he revealed that he had been diagnosed with bipolar II and adult ADHD. He has started to work with the AFL Players Association to educate young people about mental health.
