= Jason Norrish =

Australian rules footballer (born 1972)

Personal information
- Full name: Jason Ross Norrish
- Born: 26 January 1972 (age 54)
- Original team: Claremont (WAFL)
- Debut: Round 14, 3 July 1993, Melbourne vs. St Kilda, at Waverley Park

Playing career^{1}
Years	Club	Games (Goals)
1990–1992, 1995-2003	Claremont	66 (26)
1992–1994	Melbourne	20 (2)
1995–2002	Fremantle	128 (23)
Total		214 (51)
- ^{1} Playing statistics correct to the end of 2002.

Career highlights
- Doig Medal 1998; Fremantle vice-captain 1999–2001

Jason Ross Norrish (born 26 January 1972) is a former Australian rules footballer. Norrish played as a defensive midfielder and began his football career at the Claremont Tigers.

== Early career ==
Norrish grew up in Bunbury where he attended Bunbury Cathedral Grammar School. He represented WA in the State Schoolboys national championships before moving to Perth to attend Hale School. In 1990 he made his debut for Claremont and the following year played in the Tigers' premiership side. At the 1991 national draft he was taken by Melbourne with the 5th selection, with three other Claremont teammates selected before him. Norrish stayed at Claremont for the 1992 season, before moving to Melbourne in 1993.

== Melbourne Demons ==
Norrish made his debut towards the end of the 1993 season and played in five of their last nine games. The following year he missed the first seven games, before playing in most of the remaining games, including all three finals.

== Fremantle Dockers ==
With the introduction of the Fremantle Dockers to the AFL, coached by Norrish's Claremont premiership coach Gerard Neesham, he was targeted as a priority signing. He returned as an uncontracted player and Melbourne were able to select Don Cockatoo-Collins as compensation. Hampered by injury in his first three seasons at the new club, including a groin injury in 1997, he played all 22 games in 1998 and won named the club champion by one vote from Adrian Fletcher. He claimed it was an award that recognised that he was 'just doing his job properly'. His reputation and standing amongst the team was recognised in 1999 when he was named as a vice-captain, a position he held through to the 2001 season. In 2001 he became the third player to play 100 games for Fremantle.

Following his retirement from AFL in 2002, he returned to Claremont and played for a further season before work commitments resulted in his retirement from all league football. In total he played 66 games for Claremont, 20 for Melbourne, 128 for Fremantle and one state game for Western Australia. He was inducted into the WA Two Hundred Club in 2003.
