= Dale Kickett =

Australian rules footballer (born 1968)

Personal information
- Born: 4 May 1968 (age 58)
- Original team: Claremont Football Club (WAFL)
- Height: 179 cm (5 ft 10 in)
- Weight: 81 kg (179 lb)

Playing career^{1}
Years	Club	Games (Goals)
1988-2003	Claremont	82 (102)
1990	Fitzroy	15 (13)
1991	West Coast Eagles	2 (0)
1992	St Kilda	21 (20)
1993–1994	Essendon	8 (7)
1995–2002	Fremantle	135 (24)
Total		263 (166)
- ^{1} Playing statistics correct to the end of 2002.

Career highlights
- Claremont premiership side 1989, 1991, 1993; Simpson Medal 1991, 1993; Claremont best and fairest 1993; Doig Medal 1997; Fremantle Life Member: 2020; Fremantle 25 since ‘95 Team; State of Origin Western Australia; Western Australian Football Hall of Fame: 2024

Dale Mathew Kickett (born 4 May 1968) is a former Australian rules footballer who played for Fitzroy, West Coast, St Kilda, Essendon and Fremantle in the Australian Football League (AFL). Having played for five different clubs over his career spanning from 1990 until 2002, Kickett shares the record for playing for the most VFL/AFL clubs. (Note: Les Hughson and Les Abbott both also played for five teams. Kickett's teammate at St Kilda and Fremantle, Adrian Fletcher, played for five teams if the Brisbane Bears and the Brisbane Lions are considered separate teams.)

== Early career ==
Originally from Western Australia, Kickett is related to a number of other high-profile AFL footballers, including Derek Kickett (a cousin of Dale's father) and Lance "Buddy" Franklin (Dale's first cousin).

Kickett began his football career in the Avon Football Association in 1984, whilst living in the small country town of Tammin. He later moved to Perth and played three games at under 19s level with Swan Districts in 1987. He was released by them, and was asked to switch to Claremont by his uncle Larry Kickett, who was coaching their under 19s team. He made his senior football debut with Claremont in the WAFL in 1988, where he had significant success. He played with Claremont until 1989, was the club's leading goalkicker in 1989, and was part of the 1989 Premiership team.

Kickett was recruited to the Australian Football League for the 1990 season, after Fitzroy used its first pick in the 1989 national draft (No. 9 overall) to select him. Kickett played 15 senior games in his debut season, but having grown up in a small town, living in the big city of Melbourne did not suit Kickett.

At the end of the season, he was traded to the West Coast Eagles in return for pick No. 78 in the 1990 national draft. Kickett also managed only one season on the West Coast list. He was unable to break into the strong West Coast senior team, playing only two games for the team before being delisted. When on reserve, Kickett played again for Claremont, where he had a very good year, playing in his second premiership for the club and winning the Simpson Medal for the best player in the grand final.

St Kilda became the third AFL club to try Kickett, selecting him with pick No. 38 in the 1992 pre-season draft. He had a promising season in 1992, playing in 21 games, but again he lasted only one season, and returned to Western Australia after the season.

He played exclusively WAFL football with Claremont in 1993, and played in his third Claremont premiership side and won his second Simpson Medal. The 1993 WAFL season proved to be a crucial season in Kickett's career, as he made a switch from the half-forward line, where he had played up until 1993, into the half back line in the 1993 premiership side.

Essendon saw Kickett's new potential at half-back, and recruited him in the 1993 mid-season draft, but Kickett remained in Western Australia until the beginning of the 1994 season. He played eight games for the Bombers in 1994, but again lasted only one season on the club's list.

== Fremantle career ==
The introduction of the Fremantle Football Club to the AFL, to be coached by his three-time Claremont premiership coach Gerard Neesham, was a huge lure for Kickett, who had never managed to maintain a stable life in Victoria. Kickett, Tony Delaney and Todd Ridley moved to the fledgling club.

Kickett would spend seven years with the Dockers, the longest period of stability in his career. Kickett became a mainstay of the Fremantle defence, and came runner up in the Best and Fairest award in both 1995 and 1996 before winning it in 1997. In Round 20, 1999, Kickett became the first player to play 100 games for Fremantle.

Kickett was heavily involved in what would end up being known as the Demolition Derby in Round 21, 2000. Before the first bounce, Eagles ruckman Michael Gardiner began pushing and striking Dockers first year player Matthew Pavlich, resulting in a free kick to Fremantle. The remainder of the first half would be a tinderbox with numerous spot fights erupting all over the ground. Kickett, Gardiner, Brad Dodd and Phil Read would be reported that day and Kickett took the brunt of the penalties, being suspended for 9 weeks for three separate striking charges.

In 2002, Kickett's back and leg injuries started to slow down his dashes from defence. He played only the first three rounds before being dropped due to illness. He then struggled to break back into the side, before announcing his retirement from the AFL in June. As a tribute to one of the club's favourite sons, he was given a farewell match against Port Adelaide in Round 14 at Subiaco. Despite the team being well beaten, the entire crowd and the Port Adelaide team stayed on the ground at the end of the match to acknowledge Kickett's career. This game also earned Kickett membership of the AFL 200 club, with 181 league games, 17 pre-season games and 2 State of Origin games. He played one more game for Claremont in 2003, then retired altogether. With his AFL games combined with his 81 WAFL games for Claremont, he is also a member of the Western Australia Two Hundred Club.
