= Ryan Crowley =

Australian rules footballer, born 1984

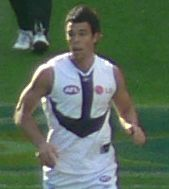

Personal information
- Full name: Ryan Morgan Crowley
- Born: 5 March 1984 (age 42)
- Original team: Calder Cannons (TAC Cup)
- Draft: No. 55, 2002 national draft No. 39, 2005 rookie draft, Fremantle
- Height: 188 cm (6 ft 2 in)
- Weight: 88 kg (194 lb)
- Position: Midfielder

Playing career^{1}
Years	Club	Games (Goals)
2003–2015	Fremantle	188 (117)
2016	Essendon	8 (2)
Total		196 (119)

International team honours^{2}
Years	Team	Games (Goals)
2006–2008	Australia	4
- ^{1} Playing statistics correct to the end of 2016.^{2} Representative statistics correct as of 2008.

Career highlights
- 2012 Doig Medal; Fremantle 25 since ‘95 Team; Fremantle Life Member: 2013

Ryan Morgan Crowley (born 5 March 1984) is a former professional Australian rules footballer who played for the Fremantle Football Club and the Essendon Football Club in the Australian Football League (AFL). He played as a midfielder and specialised in a tagging role.

== AFL career ==
Fremantle first drafted Crowley in 2002 with selection 55 at the national draft. At the end of 2004, having only played WAFL football for Subiaco, he was delisted. However, the club gave Crowley a second chance and re-selected him with their 3rd pick in the rookie draft. Good form with Subiaco in 2005 led to his elevation to the senior list when both Robert Haddrill and his replacement Michael Warren were placed on the long term injury list.

His debut was notable in that he became only the third Fremantle player to kick three goals on debut (along with Leigh Wardell-Johnson and Paul Medhurst), and these goals helped Fremantle to an upset nine-point victory over Geelong at Skilled Stadium. His continued good form in the second half of the 2005 season including 4 goals against Carlton at the MCG saw Ryan elevated to the senior list for the 2006 season. Early in the 2006 season, Ryan got a heavy blow to the face during a shepherd from Byron Pickett, and received a broken cheekbone. Crowley continued to improve throughout the 2007 season, having gathered 319 disposals in 19 games and earning a regular spot in the Fremantle midfield as a winger/onballer who can kick goals.

=== Conversion to a tagger ===
In 2008, however, he developed into a defensive midfielder or tagger and notoriously played on opposition stars such as Gary Ablett, Jr. and Daniel Kerr. He finished the year well, coming equal fifth in Fremantle's fairest and best award, the Doig Medal.

In 2009 Crowley injured his foot in the Round 6 Western Derby and was ruled out for between three months and the entire season. He didn't return to the Fremantle side until the first round of 2010. He played the first 16 games of the season, before injuring his knee against Melbourne, missing the next six games. He returned for Fremantle's two finals, after proving his fitness in a dominant display in the WAFL for Subiaco, kicking seven goals.

He continued to nullify the opponent's best midfielder each week and won the Doig Medal in 2012 as Fremantle's best and fairest player. In 2013 he was suggested as being worthy of selection in the All-Australian team, but was overlooked. He was one of Fremantle's best-performing players in their Grand Final loss to Hawthorn, limiting Sam Mitchell's influence on the game.

=== Suspension for taking banned substance ===
In March 2015, it was revealed that Crowley had tested positive for a banned substance after Fremantle's Round 17, 2014 match against Greater Western Sydney. Crowley had accepted a provisional suspension in September 2014. The banned substance has not been named, but is thought to be from a painkiller that was not prescribed by the club doctor. In June 2015, the AFL Tribunal suspended Crowley for twelve months; the suspension was backdated to the start of his provisional suspension, and he became eligible to play again on 25 September 2015. He was subsequently delisted in October.

=== Essendon ===
In January 2016, he signed with Essendon as one of their top-up players due to the supplements saga.

== Statistics ==
Legend
G	Goals	K	Kicks	D	Disposals	T	Tackles
B	Behinds	H	Handballs	M	Marks

Season	Team	No.	Games	Totals							Averages (per game)						
Season	Team	No.	Games	G	B	K	H	D	M	T	G	B	K	H	D	M	T
2005	Fremantle	15	12	10	4	98	45	143	53	19	0.8	0.3	8.2	3.8	11.9	4.4	1.6
2006	Fremantle	15	19	20	8	179	104	283	103	29	1.0	0.4	9.4	5.5	14.9	5.4	1.5
2007	Fremantle	15	19	13	11	189	130	319	85	44	0.7	0.6	10.0	6.8	16.8	4.5	2.3
2008	Fremantle	15	22	11	10	216	135	351	106	77	0.5	0.4	9.8	6.1	16.0	4.8	3.5
2009	Fremantle	15	6	4	3	47	23	70	23	16	0.7	0.5	7.8	3.8	11.7	3.8	2.7
2010	Fremantle	15	18	15	8	106	133	239	49	75	0.8	0.4	5.9	7.4	13.3	2.7	4.2
2011	Fremantle	15	19	13	10	129	115	244	60	57	0.7	0.5	6.8	6.0	12.8	3.2	3.0
2012	Fremantle	15	24	12	16	208	147	355	78	88	0.5	0.7	8.7	6.1	14.8	3.2	3.7
2013	Fremantle	15	25	9	10	192	178	370	80	74	0.4	0.4	7.7	7.1	14.8	3.2	3.0
2014	Fremantle	15	24	9	5	198	151	349	74	66	0.4	0.2	8.2	6.3	14.5	3.1	2.8
2015	Fremantle	15	0	—	—	—	—	—	—	—	—	—	—	—	—	—	—
2016	Essendon	51	8	2	3	74	67	141	36	14	0.3	0.4	9.3	8.4	17.6	4.5	1.8
Career			196	118	88	1636	1228	2864	747	559	0.6	0.4	8.3	6.3	14.6	3.8	2.9

== Personal life ==
In May 2025, Crowley was charged by police with multiple offences after being alleged to have choked and threatened a woman. Two months later, he appeared in court on charges of assault, threatening to kill, and deprivation of liberty; five offences related to Crowley's former partner, former Married at First Sight contestant Lauren Dunn, and a sixth related to another woman. Three charges against Crowley were dropped in March 2026; he pleaded not guilty to the remainder of the charges. In October 2026, Crowley was charged with four additional domestic violence offences related to Dunn.
