= Craig Callaghan =

Australian rules footballer, born 1976

Personal information
- Full name: Craig William Callaghan
- Born: 9 March 1976 (age 50); Perth, Western Australia
- Original team: Swan Districts (WAFL)
- Debut: Round 8, 20 May 1995, Fremantle. vs. Collingwood., at Victoria Park

Playing career^{1}
Years	Club	Games (Goals)
1995–2000	Fremantle	95 (69)
2001–2004	St Kilda	29 (25)
Total		124 (94)
- ^{1} Playing statistics correct to the end of 2004.

Career highlights
- 2× AFL Rising Star nominee: 1995, 1996; Swan Districts Best & Fairest award 1994

Craig William Callaghan (born 9 March 1976) is an Australian rules footballer who played for Fremantle and St Kilda in the Australian Football League (AFL). He played as a midfielder and forward pocket and began his football career at Swan Districts and won the Swan Medal for the fairest and best at the club in 1994.

== Fremantle Dockers ==
After winning the 1994 Swan Districts Best & Fairest award, Gerard Neesham saw him as a natural selection for Fremantle's inaugural squad for the 1995 AFL season. Neesham was right as Callaghan became a star in his 5 years at the club, being nominated for the AFL Rising Star award in both 1995 and 1996 and finishing in the top 5 players of Fremantle's best and fairest award three years in a row between 1996 and 1998.

== St Kilda ==
In 2000 the Dockers traded Callaghan to St Kilda in exchange for Matthew Carr. Callaghan's time at the Saints was marred by injury, spending two of his four years sidelined by knee injuries. So in 2004 after only 29 games for St Kilda he decided to retire from AFL football.

== Swan Districts ==
Callaghan returned to Western Australia to again play in the WAFL for the Swan Districts. He announced his retirement on 22 July 2006, due to another knee injury.
