= Roger Hayden =

Australian rules footballer, born 1980

Personal information
- Full name: Roger Hayden
- Born: 9 December 1980 (age 45)
- Original team: South Fremantle (WAFL)
- Draft: No. 21, 2001 Rookie Draft, Fremantle (RP), 2002 AFL draft, Fremantle
- Height: 182 cm (6 ft 0 in)
- Weight: 81 kg (179 lb)
- Position: Defender

Playing career^{1}
Years	Club	Games (Goals)
2000–2009	South Fremantle	59 (38)
2002–2011	Fremantle	128 (14)
Total		187 (62)

Representative team honours
Years	Team	Games (Goals)
2007	Indigenous All-Stars	1

International team honours
2008	Australia	2
- ^{1} Playing statistics correct to the end of 2011.

Career highlights
- Fremantle 25 since ‘95 Team; Fremantle Life Member: 2020

Roger Hayden (born 9 December 1980) is a former Australian rules footballer. He played as a back pocket for the Fremantle Football Club after beginning his senior football career with South Fremantle Football Club in the West Australian Football League (WAFL).

== Fremantle career ==
Hayden was drafted by Fremantle in the 2000 Rookie Draft. He spent the entire 2001 season on the rookie list and played for South Fremantle, mainly as a midfielder.

When full back Anthony Jones tore his pectoral muscle, Hayden was elevated off the rookie list. He made his AFL debut in round 15, 2002 against the Kangaroos in Canberra at Manuka Oval. In his second game, a Western Derby, he was challenged to play well on Phil Matera, or else it would be his last game for Fremantle. Hayden performed brilliantly (in just his second game as a defender), restricting Matera to a single goal. He would play three more games in 2002 before a hamstring injury forced him out of the team. He had shown enough, however, to be elevated permanently off the rookie list onto the senior playing list.

Hayden cemented his place amongst the so-called No Name defence alongside Robert Haddrill, Dion Woods, Antoni Grover and Shane Parker of 2003 that helped Fremantle to reach their first ever finals appearance. He played in 21 of the 23 games and finished equal 9th in the Doig Medal best and fairest award. In round 4, 2003, Hayden was one of the seven indigenous players to represent Fremantle, the most ever to play in a single AFL team. The other indigenous players for Fremantle that day were Troy Cook, Jeff Farmer, Antoni Grover, Des Headland, Steven Koops and Dion Woods.

Hayden continued his good form into 2004, but broke his leg in the round 21 Western Derby. A long and arduous rehabilitation program meant that he was unavailable for the start of the 2005 season and another hamstring injury in a WAFL game meant he was unable to break back into the Fremantle side. He was, however, able to play for South Fremantle in their 2005 Premiership side. After returning to the Fremantle lineup in Round 2 of 2006, he only managed to remain in the team for three games being dropped after a poor game against Adelaide in Round 4. After consistent performances in the WAFL for South Fremantle he returned to the AFL for the remainder of the 2006 season.

The 2007 AFL Season was undoubtedly Roger Hayden's best, playing in all 22 games and was named among the final 40 for selection in the 2007 All-Australian team.

On 31 August 2011, Roger Hayden announced his retirement at the age of 30, owing to a long-term foot injury. He has been a development coach at Fremantle since the 2012 AFL season.
