= Ben Allan =

Australian rules footballer (born 1968)

Personal information
- Born: 15 October 1968 (age 58); Perth, Western Australia
- Original team: Claremont (WAFL)
- Debut: Round 7, 1990, Hawthorn vs. Collingwood, at Waverley Park
- Height: 182 cm (6 ft 0 in)
- Weight: 83 kg (183 lb)

Playing career^{1}
Years	Club	Games (Goals)
1987–89, 1996	Claremont	66 (67)
1990–1994	Hawthorn	98 (72)
1995–1997	Fremantle	47 (34)
Total		211 (173)

Representative team honours
Years	Team	Games (Goals)
1988–1995	Western Australia	6 (2)

Coaching career
Years	Club	Games (W–L–D)
2001	Fremantle	13 (2–11–0)
- ^{1} Playing statistics correct to the end of 1997.

Career highlights
- AFL premiership player: 1991; 2× WAFL premiership player: 1987, 1989; Peter Crimmins Memorial Trophy: 1991; 2× All-Australian team: 1993, 1994; Fremantle captain: 1995–1996; 3× Simpson Medal: 1988, 1989, 1990; West Australian Football Hall of Fame, inducted 2012

Benjamin Thomas Allan (born 15 October 1968) is a former Australian rules footballer who played for the Hawthorn Football Club and Fremantle Football Club in the Australian Football League (AFL), and for the Claremont Football Club in the West Australian Football League (WAFL).

In a short but decorated playing career, Allan was appointed the inaugural captain of Fremantle, and is one of only two footballers to have won three consecutive Simpson Medals, the other being Barry Cable. He won the medal in 1988 and 1990 for being the best player in a State of Origin match involving Western Australia, and in 1989 as best on ground in the WAFL Grand Final.

== Early life ==
Allan was educated at Aquinas College, Perth

== Playing career ==
He played as a rover (or follower). He was a premiership player with Claremont in the WAFL before be drafted to the Hawthorn Football Club in the Australian Football League where he played 98 games and won their best and fairest in 1991 as well as a premiership. He was an All Australian player in 1993 and 1994.

== Fremantle career ==
Having previously coached Allan at Claremont, Gerard Neesham the inaugural Fremantle senior coach, targeted Allan to return to Western Australia. As the most experienced and highly decorated player in the initial 45 man squad, he was named Fremantle's first captain. He was the only former All-Australian, the only club best-and-fairest winner and one of only 2 former premiership players in the original Fremantle squad of 50

He played all 22 games in 1995 and finished third in the best and fairest award. In the Round 5 match against Footscray at Whitten Oval, he had the chance to win the game with a kick after the final siren from 70 metres out. Reflecting on the game in an interview for Fremantle's official website in 2019, Allan shared his thoughts as he was lining up to take the kick:

“I took a mark and the siren went and I had the shot – it was like the dream had come true. I thought to myself ‘there's a bit of a breeze here going right to left, if I can just punch this at the right goal post I reckon I can kick it.’ I used to try torpedo punts quite a bit during games and it was just the classic opportunity to let one rip. I reckon if I hit it pure on the ball I could have made the distance with that little breeze.”

The kick fell short, allowing the Bulldogs to escape with a two-point victory.

Injuries took their toll in 1996, restricting Allan to 8 games for the season. In 1997 he relinquished the captaincy to Peter Mann and managed to play 17 games. However, a degenerative knee condition caused Allan to retire from football at the end of the 1997 season. He had played 145 AFL games in total, along with 66 for Claremont and 6 state games, earning him a position in the WA Football Two Hundred Club.

== Coaching ==
Allan stayed at the club as an assistant coach in 1998. When it became clear that inaugural senior coach Gerard Neesham would not coach Fremantle in 1999, Allan tendered his resignation pending the appointment of a replacement. When interviewed by new senior coach Damian Drum, he was told no position would be available. His disappointment was obvious, telling the media:

"this is a real kick in the teeth. I saw my involvement at the club as long-term. It was a huge decision to leave Hawthorn and it seems everything has gone sour since. My career was cut short by injury and now this. It is very hard to swallow. This means Drum and the club believe I have nothing to offer – or they have made a huge mistake. The only thing that has kept me buoyed is the fact that in this industry all players and coaches get kicked in the guts at some stage."

Ironically, three years later Allan was called on as caretaker senior coach to replace Damian Drum who was sacked after the team's 10th consecutive loss, a diabolical performance against the Sydney Swans at the Sydney Cricket Ground in round nine, 2001. Despite his role three years previously as assistant coach, Allan did not view the appointment as leading to a permanent position. On being made senior coach, he told the media:

"I'm not in a caretaker role to try to further my career for next year. If you look at the history of caretaker coaches, they all wanted to have a crack at it for the next year. I'm there to help out. It gives the club time to look for someone who's been there and done that and then I can go off on my merry way. If we win every game for the rest of the year I still won't be the senior coach next year."

Fremantle won two of the remaining 13 matches with Allan as caretaker senior coach and finished last on the AFL ladder. Allan as the caretaker senior coach was demanding rather than inspiring and was openly critical of the playing group. At the press conference after a home loss to Port Adelaide he told the media:

"if they are looking for me to motivate them for the next eight weeks, they are barking up the wrong tree ... clearly out there today we had too many out there today who haven't got strong enough character".

Nevertheless, the playing group stayed reasonably competitive in many of the remaining games of the season. Allan's two victories were both notable: the first was in Round 18 against Hawthorn at Colonial Stadium, which broke an 18-match, 370-day losing series of matches (and, until round 17, 2021, would be the last time that Fremantle defeated Hawthorn outside of Western Australia), and the second was in the final match of the season against Adelaide. At the end of the 2001 AFL season, Chris Connolly replaced Allan as Fremantle Football Club senior coach.

== Statistics ==
=== Playing statistics ===
Legend
G	Goals	K	Kicks	D	Disposals	T	Tackles
B	Behinds	H	Handballs	M	Marks

Season	Team	No.	Games	Totals							Averages (per game)							Votes
Season	Team	No.	Games	G	B	K	H	D	M	T	G	B	K	H	D	M	T	Votes
1990	Hawthorn	37	6	3	4	41	13	54	11	13	0.5	0.7	6.8	2.2	9.0	1.8	2.2	0
1991^{#}	Hawthorn	15	25	18	19	350	134	484	72	53	0.7	0.8	14.0	5.4	19.4	2.9	2.1	1
1992	Hawthorn	15	23	12	15	382	132	514	88	30	0.5	0.7	16.6	5.7	22.3	3.8	1.3	5
1993	Hawthorn	15	21	20	14	412	109	521	121	42	1.0	0.7	19.6	5.2	24.8	5.8	2.0	11
1994	Hawthorn	15	23	19	17	390	123	513	101	28	0.8	0.7	17.0	5.3	22.3	4.4	1.2	3
1995	Fremantle	7	22	15	16	370	107	477	84	34	0.7	0.7	16.8	4.9	21.7	3.8	1.5	9
1996	Fremantle	7	8	2	4	87	20	107	23	9	0.3	0.5	10.9	2.5	13.4	2.9	1.1	0
1997	Fremantle	7	17	17	11	194	57	251	65	11	1.0	0.6	11.4	3.4	14.8	3.8	0.6	1
Career			145	106	100	2226	695	2921	565	220	0.7	0.7	15.4	4.8	20.1	3.9	1.5	30

=== Coaching statistics ===
Legend
W	Wins	L	Losses	D	Draws	W%	Winning percentage	LP	Ladder position	LT	League teams

Season	Team	Games	W	L	D	W %	LP	LT
2001	Fremantle	13	2	11	0	15.4%	16	16
Career totals		13	2	11	0	15.4%		

== After football ==
Allan has had an active media career in print, on radio and on TV, including The West Australian, ABC Radio, 6PR, SEN and the now defunct Fox Footy Channel. Outside of football he has become a successful businessman in the Margaret River wine industry. In 2005 he was elected to the Members position on the board of the Fremantle Football Club. He will hold that position for 2 years before all Fremantle Season Ticket holding members over 18 years vote again.

In March 2012, Allan was inducted into the West Australian Football Hall of Fame. He is the first former Fremantle player to be inducted.

== Personal life ==
He is the brother of Packed to the Rafters actor Jacob Allan.

His son, Edward, was drafted in 2022 by Collingwood.
