= Daniel Bandy =

Australian rules footballer, born 1975

Personal information
- Born: 18 November 1975 (age 50); Perth, Western Australia
- Original team: Perth (WAFL)
- Debut: Round 12, 12 August 1995, Fremantle vs. Geelong, at Skilled Stadium

Playing career^{1}
| Years | Club | Games (Goals) |
| 1995–2001 | Fremantle | 105 (80) |
| 2002–2005 | Western Bulldogs | 45 (46) |
| Total | | 150 (126) |
- ^{1} Playing statistics correct to the end of 2005.

Career highlights
- AFL Rising Star nominee: 1996

Daniel Bandy (born 18 November 1975) is a former Australian rules footballer. He played as a ruckman for Fremantle and the Western Bulldogs in the Australian Football League (AFL). He last played for West Australian Football League (WAFL) club Claremont in 2007.

== Fremantle career ==
Bandy was an original Fremantle Docker and made his AFL debut in 1995. For a player of 200 centimetres, he was extraordinarily mobile, which appealed to then Fremantle coach Gerard Neesham who recruited Bandy as a ruckman from the Perth Demons with a priority selection in 1995. In his time with Freo he became a fan favourite and dominated the ruck and forward line at certain stages during his 6 years at the club. He played 105 matches with Fremantle, kicked 80 goals, and finished third in its club best-and-fairest award in 1999.

== Western Bulldogs career ==
At the end of the 2001 season, Bandy was traded to the Western Bulldogs where he played 45 matches. He made his first appearance for the Bulldogs in 2002 and played all 22 matches that season and kicked 30 goals. Regarded as one of the fittest players at the Bulldogs, Bandy suffered several injuries in the following which ultimately restricted his playing ability and he only played 11 games in his last two seasons. In 2005 Bandy retired from the AFL. He returned to Western Australia and signed to play with WAFL club Claremont Football Club in 2006, rather than returning to his original club, Perth Football Club. He has performed very well for Claremont, finishing third in both the 2007 Sandover Medal after being the pre-count favourite, and the Claremont best and fairest award, the E.B. Cook Medal.
