= Scott Chisholm (footballer) =

Australian rules footballer

Personal information
- Full name: Scott Lawrence Chisholm
- Born: 28 May 1973 (age 53)
- Original team: St Mary's Football Club (NTFL)
- Height: 181 cm (5 ft 11 in)
- Weight: 79 kg (174 lb)

Playing career^{1}
Years	Club	Games (Goals)
1995–1998	Fremantle	63 (25)
1999–2000	Melbourne	18 (8)
Total		81 (33)
- ^{1} Playing statistics correct to the end of 2000.

Scott Lawrence Chisholm (born 28 May 1973) is a former Australian rules footballer who played for Fremantle and Melbourne in the Australian Football League (AFL) between 1995 and 2000. He played mainly as a half-back flanker and began his football career at St Mary's Football Club in the Northern Territory Football League (NTFL).

== Early career ==
Chisholm's early football career was spent in the Northern Territory, playing for St Marys, with whom he gained selection in the 'Northern Territory Team of the Year' for 1992–1993, as well as the NTFL's representative sides in 1993 and 1994, winning the Australian Day Medal as the NT's best player in 1994. He also played in St Mary's three consecutive Grand Finals between 1992 and 1994, winning two flags. He then moved to play for Claremont under coach Gerard Neesham towards the end of the 1994 WAFL season, where he played in Claremont's final four matches, including their Grand Final loss to East Fremantle.

== AFL career ==
Chisholm became an inaugural member of the Fremantle Dockers when they joined the AFL in 1995, and was awarded the club's Beacon Award as the best young player. After reaching his peak as a player in 1996 when he finished third in Fremantle's best and fairest count, following a fourth placing in 1995, Chisholm's form and fitness began to deteriorate. He was traded to Melbourne in exchange for selection 29 in the 1998 AFL draft (which was used to draft Tony Modra) after 63 games for the Dockers. Despite playing some good games for the Demons in his debut season, he played just 1 game for Melbourne in 2000 before his AFL career ended. In Round 2, 1999, at Waverley Park, Peter "Spida" Everitt, playing with St Kilda at the time, racially abused Chisholm after kicking a goal. Everitt received a $20,000 fine, a self-imposed four-match suspension, a racial awareness training program and loss of match payments. Everitt publicly apologised to Chisholm and his family and to the Aboriginal community.

== Post AFL career ==
Chisholm resumed playing semi-professional football in the minor leagues, including stints in the West Australian Football League and at his former NTFL club St Mary's, finishing his senior league career back in Western Australia at South Fremantle, playing 30 games for the Bulldogs between 2001 and 2003, including their 2001 WAFL Grand Final loss to East Perth.

== Personal life ==
Chisholm is known to his team's fans as the 'Prince' or 'The Prince of Pockets', due to unsubstantiated claims that he is a great-grandson of King Edward VIII. Chisholm's mother is a member of the Stolen Generation.

Chisholm coached the South Fremantle Women's Football Club, who won the Division 2 premiership in 2009. He has also worked for the Western Australian Education Department as an Aboriginal & Islander education officer.

In 2022, Chisholm allegedly threatened to share a compromising image of his ex in an alleged act of revenge porn and breaching a violence restraining order.
