= Justin Bollenhagen =

Australian rules footballer

Personal information
- Full name: Justin Bollenhagen
- Born: 17 December 1991 (age 34); Reynella, South Australia
- Original team: South Adelaide (SANFL)
- Draft: No. 52, 2009 National Draft, Fremantle
- Height: 184 cm (6 ft 0 in)
- Weight: 80 kg (176 lb)
- Position: Forward / Defender

Club information
- Current club: McLaren Districts Football Club

Playing career^{1}
Years	Club	Games (Goals)
2010–2011	Fremantle	4 (3)
- ^{1} Playing statistics correct to the end of 2011.

Justin Bollenhagen (born 17 December 1991) is an Australian rules footballer who played with the Fremantle Football Club in the Australian Football League (AFL). He is a quick left-footed player who predominantly plays off the half-back.

== Football career ==
Originally from the Reynella Football Club, he was recruited from the South Adelaide Football Club in the South Australian National Football League (SANFL) with selection 52 in the 2009 AFL draft. He was named in the South Australian squad for the 2009 AFL National Under 18 Championships, but missed selection in the team. He also did not play league football for South Adelaide, due to a hamstring injury. Upon moving to Western Australia he was allocated to the Perth Football Club in the West Australian Football League (WAFL), where he is coached by former Adelaide player, Andrew Jarman.

Bollenhagen made his AFL debut in the Western Derby in Round 18 of the 2010 AFL season, kicking two goals in Fremantle's highest score and biggest win against the West Coast Eagles. Subsequent to Bollenhagen's debut, Coach Mark Harvey stated: "I thought that he looked dangerous every time he got in, around that ball. I thought his pressure was quite good for a first gamer."

Bollenhagen was delisted by Fremantle Football Club at the conclusion of the 2011 AFL season. He returned to Adelaide to play for South Adelaide in the SANFL but then moved in mid-2012 and started playing with the Cranbourne Football Club in the Mornington Peninsula Nepean Football League.
