= Taylin Duman =

Australian rules footballer

Personal information
- Full name: Taylin Duman
- Born: 18 April 1998 (age 28)
- Original team: Norwood Football Club (Victoria) Oakleigh Chargers (TAC Cup)
- Draft: No. 3, 2017 rookie draft
- Height: 193 cm (6 ft 4 in)
- Weight: 83 kg (183 lb)
- Position: Defender

Playing career^{1}
Years	Club	Games (Goals)
2017–2021	Fremantle	45 (1)
- ^{1} Playing statistics correct to the end of 2021.

Career highlights
- WAFL premiership player: 2017

Taylin Duman (born 18 April 1998) is a former professional Australian rules footballer who played for the Fremantle Football Club in the Australian Football League (AFL).

Drafted with the 3rd selection in the 2017 rookie draft from the Oakleigh Chargers in the TAC Cup he played for Peel Thunder in the West Australian Football League (WAFL), Fremantle's reserve team during the 2017 season, including in the club's WAFL premiership winning team.

Duman made his AFL debut for Fremantle in round 5 of the 2018 AFL season against the Western Bulldogs at Optus Stadium. After eight games he was rewarded with a one-year contract extension, which also elevated Taylin to the senior list for the 2019 season. This was extended again in February 2019, when Fremantle signed him for a further two years.
