= Troy Cook =

Australian rules footballer (born 1976)

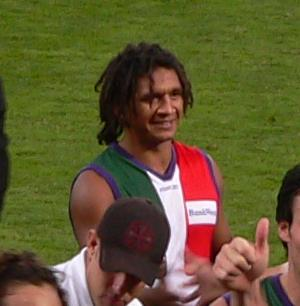

Personal information
- Born: 12 August 1976 (age 50)
- Original team: Perth (WAFL)
- Debut: Round 3, 11 April 1997, Sydney vs. Melbourne, at SCG
- Height: 176 cm (5 ft 9 in)
- Weight: 82 kg (181 lb)

Playing career^{1}
| Years | Club | Games (Goals) |
| 1994–1996, 2004-2010 | Perth | 108 (13) |
| 1997–1999 | Sydney | 43 (11) |
| 2000–2007 | Fremantle | 150 (66) |
| Total | | 301 (90) |
- ^{1} Playing statistics correct to the end of 2007.

Career highlights
- Doig Medal: 2000; AFL Rising Star nominee: 1997; Geoff Christian Medal 2000; Fremantle Life Member: 2007; Fremantle 25 since ‘95 Team

Troy Cook (born 12 August 1976) is an Australian rules footballer. Cook played for the Perth Football Club in the West Australian Football League as well as the Fremantle Football Club in the Australian Football League.

== Early career ==
Cook grew up in Carnarvon where he played for the Warriors FC and he spent his last year of school and underage football with St Patricks in Geraldton. In 1993 he was a member of the WA Under 18 team playing alongside future team-mates Shaun McManus and Peter Bell. Cook played 40 games for Perth in the West Australian Football League between 1994 & 1996 and was runner-up in the Sandover Medal in 1996.

== Sydney Swans ==
At the 1996 AFL draft Cook was chosen at pick 26 by the Swans. Cook spent the next 3 years developing his skills under coach Rodney Eade. During his time at Sydney he perfected one of his greatest assets, his tackling. He also worked with assistant coach Damian Drum who he would later meet again at Fremantle.

== Fremantle Dockers ==
On his return to WA in 2000 Cook immediately showed he was determined to be a part of the Fremantle line-up with a strong pre-season and impressive early form. By the end of the season he had played all 22 games, lead the club in disposals and was named the club champion.

=== 2003 onwards ===
Cook played all 88 regular season games (a club record for consecutive games at the time) in his first four seasons at Fremantle, but broke his ankle in the final round of 2003, forcing him to miss Fremantle's first ever finals match.

Recovering from the broken ankle, he started the 2004 season in the WAFL before eventually playing 18 games. He missed two games late in the season with a hamstring strain and was used mainly in defence. As hard at the ball as ever and, despite his slow start to the season, was fifth on Fremantle's tackles list.

On 26 August 2007 Cook announced that 2007 will be his final season of AFL football. He played his 150th and final match in Round 22, 2007, against Port Adelaide, earning him life membership of the Fremantle Dockers.

He played for the Perth Football Club in the WAFL, and retired in the middle of the 2010 season, after playing a total of 301 games for Sydney, Fremantle and Perth. He also played two games for Western Australia.

== Director of football at Perth Football Club ==
On 14 December 2016 it was announced that Troy Cook had been appointed the director of football at the Perth Football Club following a poor on-and-off-field record in recent seasons.
