= Paul Hasleby =

Australian rules footballer (born 1981)

Personal information
- Full name: Paul Andrew Hasleby
- Born: 12 June 1981 (age 45); Geraldton, Western Australia
- Original team: Northampton
- Draft: Pick 2, 1999 National Draft, Fremantle
- Height: 182 cm (6 ft 0 in)
- Weight: 87 kg (192 lb)
- Position: Midfielder

Playing career^{1}
Years	Club	Games (Goals)
1999–2007	East Fremantle	19 (18)
2000–2010	Fremantle	208 (131)
2011	South Fremantle	16 (24)
Total		243 (173)

International team honours
Years	Team	Games (Goals)
2003	Australia	2 (0)

Coaching career
Years	Club	Games (W–L–D)
2012	South Fremantle	7–13–0
- ^{1} Playing statistics correct to the end of 2011.

Career highlights
- AFL Rising Star: 2000; All-Australian: 2003; 4× Glendinning–Allan Medal: 2002, 2003, 2004, 2009; Larke Medal: 1999; East Fremantle best and fairest: 1999; 2× Geoff Christian Medal: 2000, 2004; Fremantle 25 since '95 Team; Fremantle Life Member: 2007; WA Football Hall Of Fame Inductee 2015

Paul Andrew Hasleby (born 12 June 1981) is a former Australian rules footballer. He played for the Fremantle Football Club in the Australian Football League (AFL) and the East Fremantle and South Fremantle Football Clubs in the West Australian Football League (WAFL). He was the winner of the AFL Rising Star award in 2000, and coached South Fremantle from 2012 to 2014.

== Football career ==
Hasleby grew up playing football in Northampton, a small town 470 km north of Perth. He moved to Perth to attend secondary school at Mazenod College where he played football, cricket and tennis. He represented WA in both the Under 16s and Under 18s national championships and won the Larke Medal for the best player at the 1999 Under 18 carnival. In 1999 he played 18 games of league football with East Fremantle in the West Australian Football League and won the club's best and fairest award, the Lynn Medal.

In the 1999 AFL draft Hasleby was taken by Fremantle with the 2nd selection, behind Josh Fraser, who was selected by Collingwood. Both Collingwood and the Dockers had priority picks in the draft, as they had each won 5 or fewer games in the 1999 season. In 2003, Dwayne Russell raised concerns that Fremantle had been happy to lose the final game of 1999 to ensure that they received the priority pick. Fremantle deny that they did not try to win the game, instead blaming injuries and an inexperienced team for their poor performance.

Hasleby immediately showed why he was so highly regarded with 30 possessions in his debut game in Round 1, 2000. He was awarded the AFL Rising Star nomination for that game. His form continued throughout the year and he only missed the final round due to injury. 2001 was a disappointing year for Fremantle, with only two wins for the season, and Hasleby's form also suffered. However, Hasleby did not miss a game between 2002 and 2005, despite suffering at times from a hernia-like injury during the 2005 season, and he won three Glendinning–Allan Medals in three years. In seasons 2003 and 2004 he was ranked in the top 10 in the league in total disposals (kicks plus handballs).

He suffered a season-ending knee injury in Fremantle's first NAB Cup game of 2008 against West Coast at Subiaco Oval, tearing both his anterior cruciate and medial collateral ligaments; his knee buckled as he was tackled by two opposition players.

In 2009, he won his fourth Glendinning–Allan Medal, which he still holds the outright record for.

In August 2010, Hasleby announced his retirement as a player in the AFL. He spent the 2011 season playing for the South Fremantle Football Club in the WAFL, and in November 2011, he was appointed coach of South Fremantle, after John Dimmer resigned.

== Statistics ==
Legend
G	Goals	K	Kicks	D	Disposals	T	Tackles
B	Behinds	H	Handballs	M	Marks

Season	Team	No.	Games	Totals							Averages (per game)							Votes
Season	Team	No.	Games	G	B	K	H	D	M	T	G	B	K	H	D	M	T	Votes
2000	Fremantle	4	21	15	11	280	169	449	67	48	0.7	0.5	13.3	8.0	21.4	3.2	2.3	6
2001	Fremantle	4	20	14	15	193	191	384	70	32	0.7	0.8	9.7	9.6	19.2	3.5	1.6	0
2002	Fremantle	4	22	18	15	261	226	487	97	54	0.8	0.7	11.9	10.3	22.1	4.4	2.5	7
2003	Fremantle	4	23	17	17	341	220	561	132	51	0.7	0.7	14.8	9.6	24.4	5.7	2.2	13
2004	Fremantle	4	22	7	11	295	243	538	84	97	0.3	0.5	13.4	11.0	24.5	3.8	4.4	13
2005	Fremantle	4	22	15	7	225	228	453	96	72	0.7	0.3	10.2	10.4	20.6	4.4	3.3	12
2006	Fremantle	4	16	6	6	141	153	294	71	49	0.4	0.4	8.8	9.6	18.4	4.4	3.1	2
2007	Fremantle	4	20	8	8	210	241	451	86	64	0.4	0.4	10.5	12.1	22.6	4.3	3.2	7
2008	Fremantle	4	0	—	—	—	—	—	—	—	—	—	—	—	—	—	—	—
2009	Fremantle	4	22	9	5	205	328	533	94	54	0.4	0.2	9.3	14.9	24.2	4.3	2.5	7
2010	Fremantle	4	20	22	15	139	201	340	85	57	1.1	0.8	7.0	10.1	17.0	4.3	2.9	0
Career			208	131	110	2290	2200	4490	882	578	0.6	0.5	11.0	10.6	21.6	4.2	2.8	67
