= Chris Mayne =

Australian rules footballer

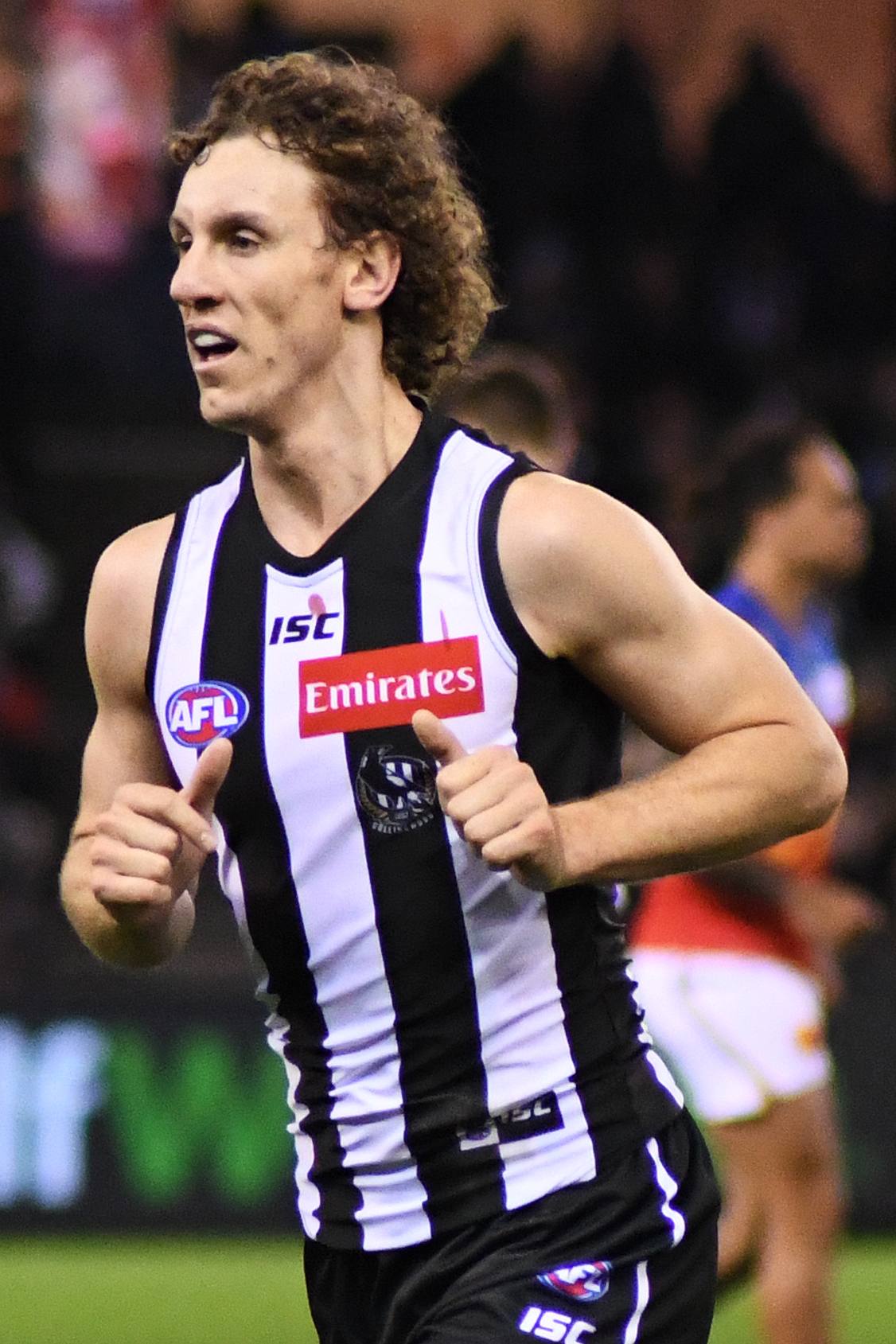
- Mayne playing for Collingwood in August 2018

Personal information
- Full name: Christopher Mayne
- Born: 2 November 1988 (age 38); Western Australia
- Original team: Perth (WAFL)
- Draft: No. 40, 2007 national draft
- Height: 188 cm (6 ft 2 in)
- Weight: 86 kg (190 lb)
- Position: Utility

Playing career^{1}
Years	Club	Games (Goals)
2008–2016	Fremantle	172 (196)
2017–2021	Collingwood	76 (11)
Total		248 (207)
- ^{1} Playing statistics correct to the end of the 2021 season.

Career highlights
- 2011 Fremantle leading goalkicker; Fremantle Life Member: 2015

Christopher Mayne (born 2 November 1988) is a former professional Australian rules footballer who played for the Fremantle Football Club and the Collingwood Football Club in the Australian Football League (AFL). He attended Kent Street Senior High School.

== Early career ==
He was selected by Fremantle with the 40th selection in the 2007 AFL National Draft from the Perth Football Club in the WAFL. He played full forward, forward-pocket and half-forward.

Mayne spent most of the 2006 season recovering from a groin injury and only played four games. He recovered in 2007, but was now too old to represent WA at the National Under 18s Championships that most potential AFL draft picks attend.

In 2007 he made his debut for Perth in the WAFL and was amongst their best players in his second match. Noticeable on the field with his curly blonde hair, the strong marking forward played eight games for Perth in 2007.

== AFL career ==
In 2008 he made an impressive debut for Fremantle in an exhibition match in South Africa against Carlton, kicking two goals.

At the conclusion of the 2016 AFL season, Mayne joined Collingwood as an unrestricted free agent after playing 172 games and kicking 196 goals for Fremantle since making his debut in 2008.

Mayne retired at the end of the 2021 AFL season.

== Statistics ==
Statistics are correct to the end of the 2021 season

Legend
G	Goals	K	Kicks	D	Disposals	T	Tackles
B	Behinds	H	Handballs	M	Marks

Season	Team	No.	Games	Totals							Averages (per game)							Votes
Season	Team	No.	Games	G	B	K	H	D	M	T	G	B	K	H	D	M	T	Votes
2008	Fremantle	23	17	10	8	105	118	223	72	32	0.6	0.5	6.2	6.9	13.1	4.2	1.9	0
2009	Fremantle	23	5	10	4	27	24	51	20	14	2.0	0.8	5.4	4.8	10.2	4.0	2.8	1
2010	Fremantle	23	14	16	9	75	91	166	61	45	1.1	0.6	5.4	6.5	11.9	4.4	3.2	0
2011	Fremantle	23	22	25	23	128	137	265	94	92	1.1	1.0	5.8	6.2	12.0	4.3	4.2	0
2012	Fremantle	23	23	39	7	163	158	321	109	83	1.7	0.3	7.1	6.9	14.0	4.7	3.6	2
2013	Fremantle	23	24	37	12	190	198	388	141	110	1.5	0.5	7.9	8.2	16.2	5.9	4.6	2
2014	Fremantle	23	23	13	11	118	186	304	106	91	0.6	0.5	5.1	8.1	13.2	4.6	4.0	0
2015	Fremantle	23	22	28	17	136	164	300	107	122	1.3	0.8	6.2	7.4	13.6	4.9	5.6	3
2016	Fremantle	23	22	18	17	142	183	325	109	119	0.8	0.8	6.4	8.3	14.8	5.0	5.4	1
2017	Collingwood	16	3	2	2	19	17	36	9	14	0.7	0.7	6.3	5.7	12.0	3.0	4.7	0
2018	Collingwood	16	21	5	11	172	188	360	108	84	0.2	0.5	8.2	9.0	17.1	5.1	4.0	0
2019	Collingwood	16	21	4	2	219	183	402	116	56	0.2	0.1	10.4	8.7	19.1	5.5	2.7	0
2020	Collingwood	16	14	0	2	87	116	203	48	38	0	0.1	6.2	8.3	14.5	3.4	2.7	0
2021	Collingwood	16	17	0	0	225	179	404	128	44	0	0	13.2	10.5	23.8	7.5	2.6	0
Career			248	207	125	1808	1941	3749	1230	944	0.8	0.5	7.3	7.8	15.1	5.0	3.8	9
