= Michael Johnson (Australian rules footballer) =

Australian rules footballer, born 1984

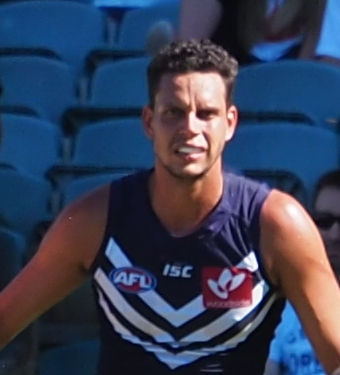
- Johnson playing for Fremantle in March 2016

Personal information
- Full name: Michael Johnson
- Born: 20 October 1984 (age 42)
- Original team: Perth (WAFL)
- Draft: No. 8, 2004 pre-season draft
- Height: 195 cm (6 ft 5 in)
- Weight: 92 kg (203 lb)
- Position: Defender

Playing career^{1}
Years	Club	Games (Goals)
2002–2010	Perth	49 (15)
2005–2018	Fremantle	244 (68)
2018	Peel Thunder	5 (0)
Total		298 (83)

Representative team honours^{2}
Years	Team	Games (Goals)
2005	Indigenous All-Stars	1 (0)
- ^{1} Playing statistics correct to the end of 2018.^{2} Representative statistics correct as of 2005.

Career highlights
- All-Australian team: 2013; Fremantle 25 since ‘95 Team; Fremantle Life Member: 2013

Michael Johnson (born 20 October 1984) is a former professional Australian rules footballer, who played for the Fremantle Football Club in the Australian Football League.

== Early life ==
Recruited from Perth Football Club in the WAFL with selection 8 in the 2004 Preseason Draft, he is a graduate of the Clontarf Football Academy.

== AFL career ==
He made his debut against Richmond in Round 4 of 2005 when Matthew Carr was a late withdrawal from the team due to illness.

Due to promising performances at both WAFL and AFL levels and his versatility, he announced a three-year extension to his contract in 2006 and then a two-year contract extensions to remain at Fremantle until the end of the 2011 season.

In 2006, Michael finished equal runner-up (with Peter Bell) in Fremantle's Doig Medal Best & Fairest count, further underlining his credentials as a prospect for the future.

His 2007 season started badly when he was suspended for four matches after colliding with Lachlan Hansen in a NAB Cup match and being one of the first players to be charged under the AFL's crackdown on front-on contact to the head.

In 2009, he was appointed captain of the club for a pre-season derby and despite missing the second half of the 2009 season due to an ankle injury, he was officially included in the leadership group for the 2010 season. He also won the club's best clubman award for 2009.

In May 2010 Johnson was investigated by the police in relation to a drug-related matter. He was charged on summons with possessing cocaine, suspended for five matches and fined $5,000 for bringing the AFL into disrepute. He pleaded guilty and was fined $500 in court.

In November 2016, Police investigated Johnson after it was alleged that he punched a Bunbury School teacher in the face while intoxicated at a kebab shop in Leederville. He was found guilty and fined a total of $4500, but was given a spent conviction.

In 2017, Johnson was integral in Fremantle's early season turnaround assisting Aaron Sandilands in the ruck despite the team generally taking a youth first approach in their team selection criteria.

Johnson retired at the end of the 2018 season. In February 2019, he was appointed as Fremantle's inaugural indigenous and multicultural liaison officer.

== Statistics ==
Legend
G	Goals	K	Kicks	D	Disposals	T	Tackles
B	Behinds	H	Handballs	M	Marks

Season	Team	No.	Games	Totals							Averages (per game)						
Season	Team	No.	Games	G	B	K	H	D	M	T	G	B	K	H	D	M	T
2005	Fremantle	37	11	1	0	46	36	82	23	11	0.1	0.0	4.2	3.3	7.5	2.1	1.0
2006	Fremantle	37	25	5	4	270	155	425	154	41	0.2	0.2	10.8	6.2	17.0	6.2	1.6
2007	Fremantle	37	18	2	1	183	130	313	100	36	0.1	0.1	10.2	7.2	17.4	5.6	2.0
2008	Fremantle	37	20	5	4	204	172	376	125	30	0.3	0.2	10.2	8.6	18.8	6.3	1.5
2009	Fremantle	37	10	8	7	122	47	169	51	18	0.8	0.7	12.2	4.7	16.9	5.1	1.8
2010	Fremantle	37	19	17	8	199	120	319	117	33	0.9	0.4	10.5	6.3	16.8	6.2	1.7
2011	Fremantle	37	22	13	10	201	118	319	99	52	0.6	0.5	9.1	5.4	14.5	4.5	2.4
2012	Fremantle	37	24	3	1	316	150	466	166	52	0.1	0.0	13.2	6.3	19.4	6.9	2.2
2013	Fremantle	37	23	5	2	321	126	447	159	44	0.2	0.1	14.0	5.5	19.4	6.9	1.9
2014	Fremantle	37	18	3	2	242	113	355	110	24	0.2	0.1	13.4	6.3	19.7	6.1	1.3
2015	Fremantle	37	15	1	0	179	92	271	104	9	0.1	0.0	11.9	6.1	18.1	6.9	0.6
2016	Fremantle	37	4	0	1	46	16	62	28	3	0.0	0.3	11.5	4.0	15.5	7.0	0.8
2017	Fremantle	37	22	2	1	229	130	359	123	34	0.1	0.0	10.4	5.9	16.3	5.6	1.5
2018	Fremantle	37	13	3	0	118	71	189	81	20	0.2	0.0	9.1	5.5	14.5	6.2	1.5
Career			244	68	41	2676	1476	4152	1440	407	0.3	0.2	11.0	6.0	17.0	5.9	1.7
