= Jeff Farmer (footballer) =

Australian rules footballer, born 1977

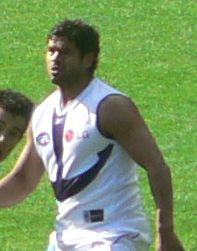
- Jeff Farmer while playing his final year of football for Fremantle in 2008

Personal information
- Full name: Jeffrey Farmer
- Nicknames: The Wizard, The Wiz
- Born: 24 June 1977 (age 49); Tambellup, Western Australia
- Original team: Tambellup/South Fremantle
- Height: 174 cm (5 ft 9 in)
- Weight: 80 kg (176 lb)

Playing career^{1}
Years	Club	Games (Goals)
1995–2001	Melbourne	118 (259)
2002–2008	Fremantle	131 (224)
2007-2009	South Fremantle	18 (50)
Total		267 (533)
- ^{1} Playing statistics correct to the end of 2008.

Career highlights
- 3× Melbourne leading goalkicker: 1997 (equal), 1998, 2000; All-Australian: 2000; AFL Goal of the Year: 1996, 1998; AFL Rising Star nominee: 1996; Fremantle 25 since '95 Team; Western Australia State of Origin team: 1998; WAFL premiership player: 2009

Jeffrey Farmer (born 24 June 1977) is a former Australian rules footballer of Aboriginal descent. He was the first Indigenous player to kick 400 goals in the Australian Football League (AFL).

== Early life ==
Farmer hails from Tambellup, Western Australia.

== AFL career ==
=== Melbourne ===
Known as "The Wizard" (or "The Wiz") because of his uncanny ability to create goals from nothing, Farmer began his AFL career with the Melbourne Football Club in 1995.

His career best goalkicking performance came against Collingwood at the MCG in 2000 when he kicked 9 goals in the second half after barely being able to get a touch in the first two-quarters. He was taken from the field for the third quarter and was on the interchange bench before Ben Beams suffered a broken wrist and was unable to continue. Farmer kicked 8 goals against North Melbourne in the 2000 preliminary final. He finished the 2000 season with a career best 76 goals and was named in the All-Australian team.

After 118 games and 259 goals for Melbourne, he was traded to Fremantle at the end of 2001.

=== Fremantle ===
Farmer kicked less than 30 goals in each of his first two seasons with Fremantle. He was the Dockers' second most productive forward for each of the 2004, 2005 and 2006 seasons.

In 2006, Farmer was instrumental in the Dockers reaching the finals for only the second time with 50 goals from just 19 matches.

On 18 August 2007, in the third quarter of a match against St Kilda at Telstra Dome, Farmer received facial injuries from a behind the play incident and was assisted from the playing area, bleeding and suffering a concussion. The incident was not witnessed by umpires, nor by any of the TV broadcast cameras. Network Ten commentator Michael Voss stated soon afterwards that he saw what happened and added that St Kilda tagger Steven Baker would be hoping it had not been captured by TV cameras. Farmer took no further part in the match, which St Kilda won by 30 points. Baker was later handed a 7-game suspension by the AFL tribunal, after being charged with rough conduct on Farmer. St Kilda appealed the decision, and included a letter from Farmer to the AFL pleading for leniency on Baker, describing Baker as one of his most respected opponents. The letter could not be accepted in the appeal, because it was new evidence. The appeal was rejected and the suspension remained.

At the end of the 2008 AFL season, Farmer announced his retirement from the AFL, ending his career with 249 career games.

== Post-AFL career ==
In 2009, Farmer was a premiership player with South Fremantle Football Club in the West Australian Football League.

== Statistics ==
Legend
G	Goals	K	Kicks	D	Disposals	T	Tackles
B	Behinds	H	Handballs	M	Marks

Season	Team	No.	Games	Totals							Averages (per game)						
Season	Team	No.	Games	G	B	K	H	D	M	T	G	B	K	H	D	M	T
1995	Melbourne	33	7	4	5	31	14	45	10	3	0.6	0.7	4.4	2.0	6.4	1.4	0.4
1996	Melbourne	33	19	37	24	130	91	221	38	25	1.9	1.3	6.8	4.8	11.6	2.0	1.3
1997	Melbourne	33	17	30	17	115	63	178	40	16	1.8	1.0	6.8	3.7	10.5	2.4	0.9
1998	Melbourne	33	19	47	33	149	55	204	45	18	2.5	1.7	7.8	2.9	10.7	2.4	0.9
1999	Melbourne	8 & 33	19	32	27	129	51	180	35	20	1.7	1.4	6.8	2.7	9.5	1.8	1.1
2000	Melbourne	33	23	76	36	196	84	280	84	36	3.3	1.6	8.5	3.7	12.2	3.7	1.6
2001	Melbourne	33	14	33	16	132	59	191	44	19	2.4	1.1	9.4	4.2	13.6	3.1	1.4
2002	Fremantle	7	20	29	27	187	89	276	77	38	1.5	1.4	9.4	4.5	13.8	3.9	1.9
2003	Fremantle	33	20	27	16	126	60	186	36	28	1.4	0.8	6.3	3.0	9.3	1.8	1.4
2004	Fremantle	33	22	36	24	153	63	216	66	51	1.6	1.1	7.0	2.9	9.8	3.0	2.3
2005	Fremantle	33	19	35	16	162	60	222	58	38	1.8	0.8	8.5	3.2	11.7	3.1	2.0
2006	Fremantle	33	22	55	21	192	62	254	70	57	2.5	1.0	8.7	2.8	11.5	3.2	2.6
2007	Fremantle	33	8	19	10	80	35	115	40	16	2.4	1.3	10.0	4.4	14.4	5.0	2.0
2008	Fremantle	33	20	23	13	206	102	308	85	34	1.2	0.7	10.3	5.1	15.4	4.3	1.7
Career			249	483	285	1988	888	2876	728	399	1.9	1.1	8.0	3.6	11.6	2.9	1.6

== Controversial incidents ==
In November 2004, Farmer pleaded guilty to assaulting his long-time girlfriend and was fined $2,000.

In December 2006 he was alleged to have been involved in a nightclub fight in which a Subiaco Football Club player, Greg Broughton, suffered a broken eye socket. No charges were laid.

Farmer was arrested in April 2007 and charged with assault for knocking out a security guard at a Perth nightclub after being refused entry. The Fremantle Football Club fined him $5,100 and suspended him for a further 6 weeks on top of his existing AFL enforced suspension for eye gouging another player during a pre-season game, which was his 10th suspension and his 14th appearance before the tribunal. In court, Farmer pleaded guilty to assault and was fined $3,000.

After serving his full suspension, Farmer returned to the Fremantle side on 30 June in the round 13 game against Carlton at Subiaco Oval. Farmer together with Des Headland, who was himself implicated in another nightclub fight during the week, were amongst the best players on the field and led the way to a 77-point thrashing. This was Fremantle's second highest ever score and their greatest winning margin ever against Carlton. Headland kicked 5 goals and Farmer kicked 4 goals and each set up many more for their teammates.

In July 2007, police charged Farmer with criminal damage after he smashed a car's side mirror in a rage after being ejected from Burswood Casino. In court he pleaded guilty to the charge and was fined $750 (with $400 compensation and $58 costs). Despite the previous conviction which was considered his last chance at the club, Fremantle did not suspend him, but fined him $10,000 (the maximum allowed under the AFL Players Association rules) and requested he donate $20,000 to charity. He was recalled to play for Fremantle the following week against league leaders Geelong.

On 25 June 2008 it was announced that Farmer was suspended for a week by the Fremantle Football Club for not attending a compulsory recovery session after the weekend's loss to St Kilda in Melbourne.

== Personal life ==
In 2025 Farmer, alongside his parents and former teammate Roger Hayden, helped design Fremantle's Indigenous jumper for the annual Sir Doug Nicholls Round.
