= Matthew Carr =

Australian rules footballer, born 1978

Personal information
- Full name: Matthew Carr
- Born: 29 December 1978 (age 47); Goomalling, Western Australia
- Original team: East Fremantle Football Club
- Height: 190 cm (6 ft 3 in)
- Weight: 87 kg (192 lb)

Playing career^{1}
Years	Club	Games (Goals)
1996–1997	Collingwood	0 (0)
1998–2000	St Kilda	28 (2)
2001–2008	Fremantle	134 (64)
Total		162 (66)
- ^{1} Playing statistics correct to the end of 2008.

Career highlights
- International Rules Series 2003

Matthew Carr (born 29 December 1978) is a former Australian rules footballer who played for Fremantle and St Kilda in the Australian Football League (AFL). He played as a half-back flanker and began his football career at East Fremantle. Matthew is the elder brother of Josh Carr, who also played for Fremantle and they both attended Corpus Christi College in Bateman, Western Australia.

== St Kilda career (1998-2000) ==
Carr was drafted by Collingwood with the 64th selection in the 1995 AFL draft, from East Fremantle in the West Australian Football League, but did not manage to make his debut for the Magpies. He then returned to East Fremantle in 1997, before being drafted by the St Kilda with their 1st round selection in the 1998 Pre-Season Draft. Carr played another year in the reserves before making his AFL debut in 1999. He played 28 games for the Saints over two seasons before being traded to Fremantle.

== Fremantle career (2001-2008) ==
Carr was traded to Fremantle at the 2000 AFL draft by St Kilda in exchange for Craig Callaghan. He played 21 games in Fremantle's disastrous 2001 season, which saw the club take out the wooden spoon; having been part of the St Kilda side that finished last in 2000, this meant Carr played in consecutive wooden spoon seasons with two different sides. He played every game in 2002 and after an excellent 2003 season, in which he was sixth in Fremantle's best and fairest, his 2004 season was severely disrupted by injury. An ankle problem early in the season and a broken leg later in the season saw Carr restricted to just 11 games.

Matthew's 2005 season was also affected by injury, he had been averaging more than 25 disposals per match before the Rd 9 match against Hawthorn. Carr was only able to manage 14 disposals while apparently under duress against Hawthorn. He returned for the Rd 18 clash against Collingwood but did little in the last 4 games of the season.

From the 2006 season onward, Matthew was generally used in a utility/tagging role, often given the assignment of playing against the opposition's best midfield player. He was generally very effective in that role and finished the 2006 season having played every game for the Dockers, including three appearances in the 2006 finals series. However, throughout 2006 and 2007 seasons, injuries and fitness concerns continued to hamper his game and, although a serviceable player, he never returned to his earlier form.

Carr played four games in the 2008 season before announcing his retirement on 19 May 2008. His 134th and last game for Fremantle was played against the Adelaide Crows at AAMI Stadium on 19 April 2008.

He continued to play football in the West Australian Football League, but switched to Swan Districts from East Fremantle in 2009.

== Personal life ==
Carr's son, Jaren, was drafted as a father-son selection in the 2024 AFL draft.
