= Luke Strnadica =

Australian rules footballer (born 1998)

Personal information
- Born: 1 January 1998 (age 28)
- Original team: Winnacott JFC
- Draft: No. 20, 2017 rookie draft (Fremantle); SSP, 2021 pre-season draft (West Coast)
- Height: 203 cm (6 ft 8 in)
- Weight: 103 kg (227 lb)
- Position: Ruckman/Forward

Playing career
Years	Club	Games (Goals)
2017–18	Fremantle	0 (0)
2022	West Coast Eagles	2 (1)

Luke Strnadica (born 1 January 1998) is an Australian rules footballer who played for the West Coast Eagles in the Australian Football League (AFL).

A ruckman and forward, Strnadica played his earliest football for Winnacott in the Perth suburb of Willagee. He was a member of the AFL Academy and played in the colts for East Fremantle. In 2016, Strnadica represented Western Australia at the under-18s AFL National Championships, kicking four goals against Vic Country.

Strnadica was selected in the 2017 rookie draft by Fremantle. During his two seasons with Fremantle, Strnadica was unable to break into the AFL side and instead played all his football for Peel Thunder. He got delisted at the end of the 2018 AFL season and was signed by East Fremantle.

Following a strong 2021 WAFL season with East Fremantle, in which he averaged 34.3 hit-outs, Strnadica joined the West Coast Eagles as a train-on player in the off-season. He was secured by the Eagles during the supplemental selection period of the 2021 pre-season draft to serve as a back-up ruckman. With both Nic Naitanui and Hugh Dixon injured, Strnadica made his AFL debut off the interchange bench against Port Adelaide in round six. He retained his place for their next fixture against Richmond. Before the end of the season he stepped away from football citing personal reasons and didn't play for the Eagles again.
