= Adrian Fletcher =

Australian rules footballer (born 1969)

Personal information
- Full name: Adrian Fletcher
- Born: 10 October 1969 (age 57)
- Original team: Glenorchy (TFL)
- Draft: No. 20, 1988 national draft
- Height: 178 cm (5 ft 10 in)
- Weight: 84 kg (185 lb)

Playing career^{1}
Years	Club	Games (Goals)
1989–1991	Geelong	23 (10)
1992	St Kilda	22 (10)
1993–1996	Brisbane Bears	86 (49)
1997	Brisbane Lions	21 (4)
1998–2001	Fremantle	79 (24)
Total		231 (97)
- ^{1} Playing statistics correct to the end of 2001.

Career highlights
- Fremantle co-captain: 2000–2001; Doig Medal: 1999; Norm Goss Memorial Medal: 2003; Geoff Christian Medal: 1999; VFL premiership player: 2003; William Leitch Medal: 1988

Adrian Fletcher (born 10 October 1969) is a former Australian rules footballer and current assistant coach. He is regarded as one of football's nomads, having played for five Australian Football League clubs in his 13-year career. Fletcher's was regarded as excellent at reading the play, which resulted in him gaining prolific numbers of possessions and disposals, especially handballs.

== Playing career ==
=== Early career ===
Fletcher was recruited from the Tasmanian Football League (TFL) club Glenorchy with the 20th selection in the 1988 VFL draft by the Geelong Football Club after winning the William Leitch Medal as the best player in the TFL.

He played 23 games for Geelong between 1989 and 1991, kicking 10 goals. Fletcher was traded to St Kilda in 1992, where he played 22 games, kicking 10 goals.

Due to a contract dispute, he left the Saints and was selected by the Brisbane Bears with the 4th selection in the 1993 Pre-season draft.

=== Brisbane ===
Fletcher made his name as a tough, ball-winning midfielder at the Brisbane Bears. Between 1993 and 1996, Fletcher played 86 of a possible 90 games, finishing in the top five of the club champion award in each year. He was a significant player in the Bears' 1996 preliminary final loss to North Melbourne playing on the half back line.

Following the Bears' merger with Fitzroy, Fletcher was a member of the inaugural Brisbane Lions team in 1997. However, the lack of a solid pre-season led to an e early season form slump. He fought back, however, and ended up with a season average of 19 possessions per game (21 games). Despite this, he was traded to Fremantle.

=== Fremantle ===
Fletcher had an immediate impact at Fremantle, finishing second in the club's Best and Fairest award in 1998 and winning it in 1999; additionally, he won Fremantle's first-ever Glendinning–Allan Medal, which had previously only been won, nine times, by West Coast players. He was then named co-captain along with Shaun McManus in 2000 and 2001. At the end of the 2001 season he was asked to retire by the Fremantle club despite being ranked in the AFL's top 20 for overall disposals and also was in the AFL's top five for handballs. He played 79 games for the Dockers, ending up with 25 goals.

Fletcher is often remembered as the Fremantle player whose kick was accidentally intercepted and "chest-marked" by field umpire Peter Carey, during general play, in round 15, 1999. This caused a unique stoppage, which was controversially resolved by Carey with a ball-up.

=== Statistics ===
Legend
G	Goals	K	Kicks	D	Disposals	T	Tackles
B	Behinds	H	Handballs	M	Marks

Season	Team	No.	Games	Totals							Averages (per game)							Votes
Season	Team	No.	Games	G	B	K	H	D	M	T	G	B	K	H	D	M	T	Votes
1989	Geelong	4	8	5	1	76	53	129	22	4	0.6	0.1	9.5	6.6	16.1	2.8	0.5	0
1990	Geelong	4	9	3	2	106	93	199	23	11	0.3	0.2	11.8	10.3	22.1	2.6	1.2	1
1991	Geelong	4	6	2	0	68	62	130	19	10	0.3	0.0	11.3	10.3	21.7	3.2	1.7	0
1992	St Kilda	16	22	10	7	231	223	454	73	38	0.5	0.3	10.5	10.1	20.6	3.3	1.7	5
1993	Brisbane Bears	6	20	15	6	236	235	471	87	41	0.8	0.3	11.8	11.8	23.6	4.4	2.1	4
1994	Brisbane Bears	6	19	5	5	236	213	449	68	35	0.3	0.3	12.4	11.2	23.6	3.6	1.8	6
1995	Brisbane Bears	6	23	14	11	319	294	613	96	49	0.6	0.5	13.9	12.8	26.7	4.2	2.1	7
1996	Brisbane Bears	6	24	15	17	341	239	580	90	61	0.6	0.7	14.2	10.0	24.2	3.8	2.5	14
1997	Brisbane Lions	6	21	4	10	238	172	410	84	59	0.2	0.5	11.3	8.2	19.5	4.0	2.8	8
1998	Fremantle	2	16	8	6	225	142	367	68	40	0.5	0.4	14.1	8.9	22.9	4.3	2.5	3
1999	Fremantle	2	22	9	5	298	283	581	105	38	0.4	0.2	13.5	12.9	26.4	4.8	1.7	15
2000	Fremantle	2	20	4	2	215	220	435	67	53	0.2	0.1	10.8	11.0	21.8	3.4	2.7	10
2001	Fremantle	2	21	3	5	230	250	480	97	54	0.1	0.2	11.0	11.9	22.9	4.6	2.6	3
Career			231	97	77	2819	2479	5298	899	493	0.4	0.3	12.2	10.7	22.9	3.9	2.1	76

== Post-AFL and coaching career ==
Delisted by Fremantle after the 2001 season, and not being drafted by another AFL club, Fletcher retired from the AFL, and played for Williamstown Football Club in the VFL for two years. He played 41 games and kicked 17 goals.

Fletcher won the Williamstown best and fairest award in both these seasons and also won the Norm Goss Medal for best on ground in the 2003 VFL grand final, Fletcher's last game of senior football. He also was a development coach for the Collingwood Football Club (Williamstown's AFL-affiliate) during this time.

In 2004, Fletcher joined the Geelong Football Club as an assistant coach before returning to Collingwood in 2005 as their midfield coach. After the 2007 season, he left Collingwood and returned to the Brisbane Lions as an assistant coach, where he remains as of 2011.

He has made several appearances in AFL Legends Matches. His wife, Narelle Fletcher, played 295 games in the Women's National Basketball League.

Fletcher's son, Jaspa, was taken at Pick 12 in the 2022 AFL draft by the Brisbane Lions under the father–son rule, playing in the 2023, 2024 and 2025 AFL Grand finals.
