= Stephen O'Reilly (footballer) =

Australian rules footballer, born 1972

Personal information
- Full name: Stephen Phillip O'Reilly
- Born: 9 November 1972 (age 53)
- Original team: Swan Districts (WAFL)
- Debut: Round 3, 1993, Geelong vs. North Melbourne, at Kardinia Park

Playing career^{1}
Years	Club	Games (Goals)
1990-1992	Swan Districts	41 (16)
1993–1994	Geelong	36 (5)
1995–1999	Fremantle	98 (15)
2000	Carlton	12 (1)
Total		187 (37)
- ^{1} Playing statistics correct to the end of 2000.

Career highlights
- Doig Medal 1996; State of origin Western Australia

Stephen Phillip O'Reilly (born 9 November 1972) is an Australian rules footballer, who mainly played as a full back. He was educated at Aquinas College, Perth.

== WAFL career ==
He initially played for Swan Districts in the WAFL before being drafted to Geelong in the AFL with selection 9 in the 1991 National Draft. As was common at the time, O'Reilly decided against moving to Geelong immediately and instead remained at Swan Districts for the 1992 season.

== Geelong career ==
In 1993 he made the move east and played in 12 games in his debut season. In 1994 he only missed one game and was a member of Geelong's losing grand final side.

== Fremantle career ==
As a strong defender, he was targeted by the newly formed Fremantle Dockers for the 1995 season. He led an inexperienced backline in their initial seasons, and finished 4th, 1st and 6th in the Best and Fairest award in his first three years at the new club. Following the 1997 O'Reilly suffered a bad hamstring tear in which the muscle was completely torn off the bone. The 1998 and 1999 seasons saw him play at both ends of the ground, but not as effectively as the earlier years.

== Carlton career and scandal ==
O'Reilly requested a transfer back to Melbourne at the end of 1999 season. Carlton agreed to a trade and Fremantle received selections 16 and 46 in return. O'Reilly played 12 games for Carlton in 2000, but due to a recurring back injury couldn't regain the form he had shown at Fremantle. He retired at the end of 2000 having played a total of 146 games over 8 years at three clubs.

At the end of 2002, it was revealed that Carlton had been systematically cheating the league salary cap during the early 2000s, making payments outside the salary cap to O'Reilly and three other players. The scandal resulted in the club paying a $930,000 penalty and losing picks in multiple drafts.
