= Luke McPharlin =

Australian rules footballer, born 1981

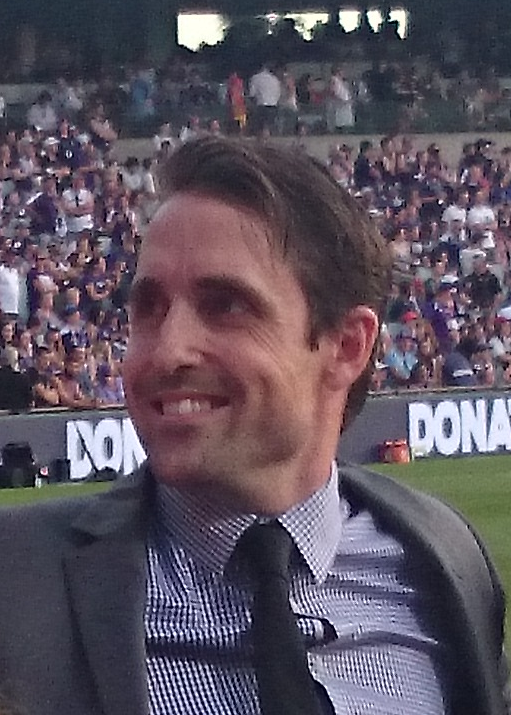
- McPharlin in April 2016

Personal information
- Full name: Luke Daniel McPharlin
- Nickname: Woosh
- Born: 1 December 1981 (age 44); Perth, Western Australia
- Original team: East Fremantle (WAFL)
- Draft: 10th pick, 1999 National Draft (Hawthorn)
- Height: 192 cm (6 ft 4 in)
- Weight: 90 kg (198 lb)
- Position: Defender / Forward

Playing career^{1}
| Years | Club | Games (Goals) |
| 2000–2001 | Hawthorn | 12 (3) |
| 2002–2015 | Fremantle | 244 (112) |
| Total | | 256 (115) |
- ^{1} Playing statistics correct to the end of 2015.

Career highlights
- 2005 Mark of the Year; 2012 All-Australian team; Fremantle Life Member: 2010; Fremantle 25 since '95 Team

Luke Daniel McPharlin (born 1 December 1981) is a former professional Australian rules footballer who played in the Australian Football League (AFL) for the Fremantle Football Club between 2002 and 2015, after two seasons with the Hawthorn Football Club. Throughout his AFL career, McPharlin predominantly played as a key defender.

== AFL career ==
McPharlin was recruited from East Fremantle in Western Australia to the Hawthorn Football Club after being taken at Pick 10 in the 1999 AFL draft. He made his debut in 2000, kicking a goal with his first kick, but played just 12 total games in his first two seasons at Hawthorn while studying at Melbourne University. Feeling home sick in Melbourne, McPharlin jumped at the chance of returning to Perth, and was subsequently traded to Fremantle following the 2001 season. McPharlin battled injury early on in his career, managing just over 50 games in his first five seasons.

In 2005, McPharlin garnered Mark of the Year honours for his spectacular chestmark against the West Coast Eagles in Round Three.

McPharlin played his 200th AFL game in Round 13, 2012 against Essendon. That season, he was named in the All-Australian team as a defender.

In 2013, McPharlin helped lead Fremantle to their first ever AFL Grand Final appearance, where they were defeated by Hawthorn by 15 points, ending the club's best season in their 19-year history just short of their first premiership success.

McPharlin struggled to play regularly in 2013 and 2014 with calf and achilles-related issues, managing just 29 games over those two seasons. He also did not feature in Fremantle's finals campaigns in 2014 and 2015 due to calf problems.

On 30 September 2015, McPharlin announced his retirement from the AFL after 256 games and 16 seasons in the league. McPharlin departed Fremantle sitting third on the club's games record list with 244, behind only Matthew Pavlich who retired on 353 and David Mundy who retired on 376.

== Personal life ==
McPharlin was the lead guitarist and singer of a Baháʼí Youth Music outfit, "Calling, Waiting, Searching". His musical skills led him to win The Footy Show's musical contest Screamers in 2005. On 24 July 2011, it was announced that McPharlin would release his debut album later that year in collaboration with local Perth act Stella's Kitchen.

He was educated at Christ Church Grammar School in Perth where he graduated in 1999. McPharlin and his wife, Kalinz, have two daughters. After retiring from football McPharlin and his family moved to Broome where he works as a pharmacist. As of 2022, he and his family have moved back to Perth and now live in Beaconsfield.

He was recently interviewed in the Mind and Soul Matters Podcast where he talks candidly about the struggles he faced early in his football career, and also about his beliefs and faith.

== Honours and achievements ==
Team

- McClelland Trophy (Fremantle) 2015

Individual

- 2005 Mark of the Year
- 2012 All-Australian team
- Fremantle Life Member: 2010
- Fremantle 25 since '95 Team

== Statistics ==
Legend
| G | Goals | K | Kicks | D | Disposals | T | Tackles |
| B | Behinds | H | Handballs | M | Marks |

| Season | Team | No. | Games | Totals | | | | | | | Averages (per game) | | | | | | |
| Season | Team | No. | Games | G | B | K | H | D | M | T | G | B | K | H | D | M | T |
|---|---|---|---|---|---|---|---|---|---|---|---|---|---|---|---|---|---|
| 2000 | Hawthorn | 18 | 4 | 1 | 3 | 11 | 7 | 18 | 6 | 0 | 0.2 | 0.8 | 2.8 | 1.8 | 4.5 | 1.5 | 0.0 |
| 2001 | Hawthorn | 18 | 8 | 2 | 2 | 44 | 33 | 77 | 35 | 4 | 0.2 | 0.2 | 5.5 | 4.1 | 9.6 | 4.4 | 0.5 |
| 2002 | Fremantle | 15 | 11 | 7 | 4 | 92 | 58 | 150 | 58 | 19 | 0.6 | 0.4 | 8.4 | 5.3 | 13.6 | 5.3 | 1.7 |
| 2003 | Fremantle | 18 | 12 | 0 | 2 | 108 | 64 | 172 | 77 | 25 | 0.0 | 0.2 | 9.0 | 5.3 | 14.3 | 6.4 | 2.1 |
| 2004 | Fremantle | 18 | 16 | 4 | 1 | 173 | 73 | 246 | 106 | 28 | 0.2 | 0.1 | 10.8 | 4.6 | 15.4 | 6.6 | 1.8 |
| 2005 | Fremantle | 18 | 19 | 34 | 12 | 144 | 56 | 200 | 104 | 24 | 1.8 | 0.6 | 7.6 | 3.0 | 10.5 | 5.5 | 1.3 |
| 2006 | Fremantle | 18 | 22 | 15 | 9 | 184 | 62 | 246 | 144 | 27 | 0.7 | 0.4 | 8.4 | 2.8 | 11.2 | 6.6 | 1.2 |
| 2007 | Fremantle | 18 | 21 | 8 | 1 | 173 | 124 | 297 | 152 | 38 | 0.4 | 0.0 | 8.2 | 5.9 | 14.1 | 7.2 | 1.8 |
| 2008 | Fremantle | 18 | 20 | 21 | 14 | 192 | 105 | 297 | 142 | 30 | 1.0 | 0.7 | 9.6 | 5.2 | 14.8 | 7.1 | 1.5 |
| 2009 | Fremantle | 18 | 18 | 20 | 18 | 150 | 90 | 240 | 102 | 24 | 1.1 | 1.0 | 8.3 | 5.0 | 13.3 | 5.7 | 1.3 |
| 2010 | Fremantle | 18 | 17 | 0 | 3 | 138 | 116 | 254 | 97 | 29 | 0.0 | 0.2 | 8.1 | 6.8 | 14.9 | 5.7 | 1.7 |
| 2011 | Fremantle | 18 | 20 | 1 | 1 | 191 | 116 | 307 | 129 | 35 | 0.0 | 0.0 | 9.6 | 5.8 | 15.4 | 6.4 | 1.8 |
| 2012 | Fremantle | 18 | 21 | 1 | 2 | 230 | 119 | 349 | 171 | 28 | 0.0 | 0.1 | 11.0 | 5.7 | 16.6 | 8.1 | 1.3 |
| 2013 | Fremantle | 18 | 16 | 0 | 0 | 195 | 71 | 266 | 137 | 21 | 0.0 | 0.0 | 12.2 | 4.4 | 16.6 | 8.6 | 1.3 |
| 2014 | Fremantle | 18 | 13 | 1 | 0 | 132 | 79 | 211 | 93 | 12 | 0.1 | 0.0 | 10.2 | 6.1 | 16.2 | 7.2 | 0.9 |
| 2015 | Fremantle | 18 | 18 | 0 | 0 | 169 | 114 | 283 | 124 | 17 | 0.0 | 0.0 | 9.4 | 6.3 | 15.7 | 6.9 | 0.9 |
| Career | | | 256 | 115 | 72 | 2326 | 1287 | 3613 | 1677 | 361 | 0.4 | 0.3 | 9.1 | 5.0 | 14.1 | 6.6 | 1.4 |
