= Peter Mann (footballer) =

Australian rules footballer, born 1970

Personal information
- Born: 7 September 1970 (age 56); Perth
- Original team: Claremont (WAFL)
- Debut: Round 2, 1991, North Melbourne vs. Brisbane Bears, at Carrara Stadium

Playing career^{1}
Years	Club	Games (Goals)
1991–1994	North Melbourne	39 (12)
1995–1999	Fremantle	77 (88)
Total		116 (100)
- ^{1} Playing statistics correct to the end of 1999.

Career highlights
- Claremont premiership side 1989; Fremantle leading goalkicker 1995; Doig Medal 1995; Fremantle captain 1997–98; Western Australia State of Origin representative

Peter Travis Mann (born 7 September 1970) is a former Australian rules footballer. who played a total of 118 matches in the AFL for the North Melbourne and Fremantle Football Clubs. Peter is currently residing in Perth.

== Claremont and North Melbourne ==
After playing 22 senior games in his debut season for Claremont, including their win in the WAFL Grand Final, Mann was drafted by the West Coast Eagles as a pre-draft priority selection in the 1989 VFL Draft. He remained on the Eagles' list for the 1990 season, but did not play a game for them.

He was then traded to North Melbourne prior to the 1990 AFL draft, in return for the 9th selection (which the Eagles used to draft Matt Clape).

Mann played 39 games for the Kangaroos between 1991 and 1994, kicking 12 goals, but playing mainly at centre half back.

== Fremantle ==
With the entry of the second WA team in 1995 he was lured home to join many of his ex-Claremont teammates at the Fremantle Dockers. Peter Mann played the centre half forward position for most of the 1995 season. His achievements in that season, 22 games, 33 goals, 159 marks and the Club Champion Award was especially noteworthy. He was the main forward marking target with limited support from John Hutton (13 games, 27 goals), Craig Burrows (19 games, 23 goals), Todd Ridley (18 games, 15 goals), Chris Groom (7 games, 18 goals) Nor did Fremantle's chip and draw style often allow for swift, direct delivery into the forward area. Mann was again productive, if inaccurate, on the Fremantle forward line in 1996, 18 games delivered 25.27 and 98 marks. The introduction of Kingsley Hunter as full forward provided an alternative marking target. His fourth in the Club Champion Award was a credible achievement given a torn foot tendon prevented him training between games.

== Captaincy ==
Peter Mann was appointed captain of Fremantle when Ben Allan resigned the captaincy in March 1997 due to a chronic knee injury. In 40 games as captain, Mann never again achieved the high standards of his first two seasons, often due to a variety of injuries. With the exception of successive dominant 1997 games against the Western Bulldogs at Subiaco in round 16 (13 marks, 4 goals) and Hawthorn at Waverley in round 17 (6 marks, 3 goals), both of which earned two Brownlow medal votes.

Another frustrating year followed in 1998. In a team desperate for leadership and marking forwards, Mann was again sporadic. So poor was his form by round 9 that he was dropped from the team for three weeks. His comeback match, Fremantle's 8-point victory against Carlton in round 13, was his best for the season, with 12 marks and 2 goals. By round 16, with form again wavering, Mann was shifted to defence and remained there until his season, and spell as captain, ended when he broke down in the warm-up at the MCG in round 20 against North Melbourne. Relieved of the captaincy, Mann played 7 games in 1999. His final match was Fremantle's record-breaking loss against Brisbane at the Gabba in round 20. Delisted in the major list changes at the end of Damian Drum's disastrous first season, Mann nominated for the 2000 preseason draft but was not selected. He played 77 AFL games for Fremantle, kicking 88 goals. Overall, he played 116 games.
