= Shane Parker (footballer) =

Australian rules footballer

Personal information
- Born: 18 February 1973 (age 53)
- Original teams: Subiaco Football Club, WAFL
- Debut: Round 3, 1995, Fremantle vs. Fitzroy, at Whitten Oval
- Height: 187 cm (6 ft 2 in)
- Weight: 92 kg (203 lb)

Playing career
Years	Club	Games (Goals)
1993–2007	Subiaco	51 (6)
1995–2007	Fremantle	238 (11)
Total		289 (17)

Career highlights
- Fremantle best and fairest: 2nd 1997 & 2005; 3rd 2002; WA State of Origin team: 2002, 2004 & 2006; Fremantle vice-captain: 2002; Fremantle Life Member: 2003; Fremantle 25 since '95 Team

Shane Parker (born 18 February 1973) is a former Australian rules footballer who played for the Fremantle Football Club. He made his debut in 1995, Fremantle's inaugural year in the Australian Football League.

In 2005, Parker became the first person to play 200 games for the club and celebrated the match by kicking the 10th goal in his career, his first goal in almost 4 seasons. He was known for his reliability in defence and his reclusive nature.

On 24 August 2007 after 238 games, Parker announced his retirement from AFL football (along with fellow player Troy Cook). Parker was the Dockers longest serving player for Fremantle until it was broken by Matthew Pavlich in 2016. Pavlich's record was however broken by David Mundy in 2021.

Parker attended St Stephen's School, Perth and is a devout Christian. In 2005 he was allegedly religiously vilified by Fraser Gehrig.
