= Robbie Haddrill =

Australian rules footballer

Personal information
- Full name: Robert Haddrill
- Born: 28 January 1981 (age 45)
- Original team: Perth (WAFL)
- Debut: Round 15, 15 July 2001, Fremantle vs. Western Bulldogs, at Telstra Dome

Playing career^{1}
Years	Club	Games (Goals)
2001–2007	Fremantle	58 (0)
- ^{1} Playing statistics correct to the end of 2007.

Career highlights
- International Rules 2004

Robert "Robbie" Haddrill (born 28 January 1981) is a defender for the South Fremantle Football Club, having previously played for the Fremantle Dockers in the AFL for seven seasons.

Haddrill attended Aquinas College, Perth before being drafted from the Perth Football Club in the WAFL in the 2000 Rookie Draft. He was elevated to the senior list during the 2001 season but his AFL career was riddled with injuries. Despite a presence on the Fremantle list for seven seasons, of his 58 AFL games he played 45 in 2003 and 2004. He played the final 8 games of 2001 before missing the entire 2002 season with a knee injury. He returned in 2003 to play all 23 games, including Fremantle's first final. His good form continued through 2004 and was rewarded with selection in the Australian International Rules team that toured Ireland. From 2005 to 2007, however, he was affected by ankle, knee and hamstring injures that restricted Haddrill to only 5 games in total, with only single appearances in 2006 and 2007. Following his delisting at the end of the 2007 season Haddrill switched WAFL clubs to join South Fremantle.

He holds the Fremantle record for the most games from debut without scoring a goal with 58 games.
