= Stephen Hill (Australian footballer) =

Australian rules footballer

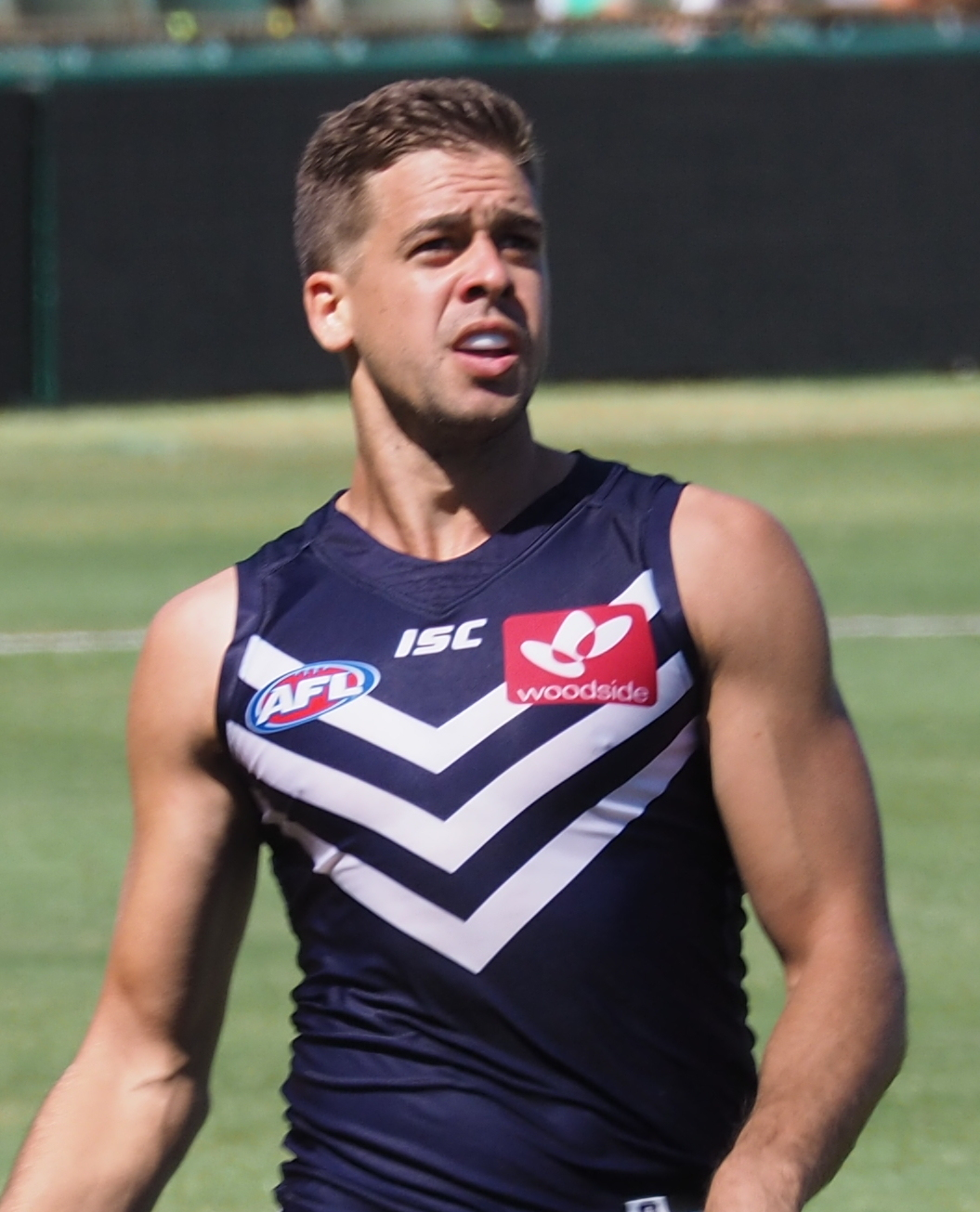
- Hill playing for Fremantle in 2016

Personal information
- Full name: Stephen Hill
- Born: 1 May 1990 (age 36)
- Original team: West Perth (WAFL)
- Draft: 3rd overall, 2008; Fremantle
- Debut: Round 1, 2009, Fremantle vs. Western Bulldogs, at Subiaco Oval
- Height: 183 cm (6 ft 0 in)
- Weight: 82 kg (181 lb)
- Position: Midfielder

Playing career^{1}
Years	Club	Games (Goals)
2009–2021	Fremantle	218 (112)
- ^{1} Playing statistics correct to the end of 2021.

Career highlights
- 2008 Under 18 All-Australian Team; 2009 AFL Rising Star nominee; Ross Glendinning Medal Round 15, 2014; AFLCA best young player of the year: 2010; Fremantle 25 since '95 Team; Fremantle Life Member: 2015

Stephen Hill (born 1 May 1990) is a former Australian rules footballer who played for the Fremantle Football Club in the Australian Football League (AFL).

== Junior career ==
Hill played for West Perth in the WAFL and represented Western Australian in the 2008 AFL Under 18 Championships and after playing some very impressive games was named in the Under 18 All-Australian Team. He was originally tipped to be drafted later in the draft, but in the week leading up to the draft it was widely predicted that Fremantle would select him before Subiaco's Daniel Rich.

== AFL career ==
Hill was drafted with Fremantle's first pick, the third overall, in the 2008 AFL draft. He made his debut during Round 1 of the 2009 AFL season against the Western Bulldogs, kicking a goal with his first kick in AFL football, courtesy of a 50-metre penalty. Hill had some quiet games before playing his best game in the round 6 Western Derby against the Eagles. Hill gathered 21 possessions, 2 goals and a game high 7 inside 50s in Fremantle's come from behind win, which saw him earn the AFL Rising Star nomination for round 6. In the same game he also polled the 3 Brownlow votes as best on ground.

Hill improved dramatically over his career at Fremantle, an example being his ability to think quickly and efficiently during games, attributed by his often surges of fast speed when possessing the ball. Hill retired from AFL in August 2021 after several consecutive injury plagued seasons.

== Personal life ==
Until he was drafted by Fremantle, Hill supported the West Coast Eagles. Hill is the older brother of former teammate Bradley Hill and first cousin of former Giant and 2023 Collingwood premiership player and Norm Smith Medallist Bobby Hill. He is also the second cousin of former Western Bulldogs and West Coast forward Joshua Hill.

The 2013 AFL Grand Final saw the Hill brothers become the first siblings to play against each other in a Grand Final since the 1912 VFL Grand Final.

== Statistics ==
Statistics are correct to the end of the 2021 season

Legend
G	Goals	K	Kicks	D	Disposals	T	Tackles
B	Behinds	H	Handballs	M	Marks

Season	Team	No.	Games	Totals							Averages (per game)						
Season	Team	No.	Games	G	B	K	H	D	M	T	G	B	K	H	D	M	T
2009	Fremantle	32	22	9	7	155	170	325	69	60	0.6	0.5	7.0	7.7	14.8	3.1	2.7
2010	Fremantle	32	23	19	15	206	193	399	61	61	0.8	0.6	9.0	8.4	17.4	2.6	2.6
2011	Fremantle	32	22	15	13	213	172	385	67	53	0.7	0.6	9.7	7.8	17.5	3.0	2.4
2012	Fremantle	32	22	10	13	230	160	390	53	70	0.4	0.6	10.4	7.3	17.7	2.4	3.2
2013	Fremantle	32	19	12	7	206	158	364	52	49	0.6	0.4	10.8	8.3	19.2	2.7	2.6
2014	Fremantle	32	20	18	11	303	140	443	53	56	0.9	0.6	15.2	7.0	22.2	2.6	2.8
2015	Fremantle	32	23	17	10	362	190	552	88	67	0.7	0.4	15.7	8.3	24.0	3.8	2.9
2016	Fremantle	32	21	4	7	332	190	522	63	81	0.2	0.3	15.8	9.0	24.9	3.0	3.9
2017	Fremantle	32	18	4	3	245	139	384	48	67	0.2	0.2	13.6	7.7	21.3	2.7	3.7
2018	Fremantle	32	13	3	2	153	86	239	52	40	0.2	0.2	11.8	6.6	18.4	4.0	3.1
2019	Fremantle	32	3	1	0	17	18	35	4	5	0.3	0.0	5.7	6.0	11.7	1.3	1.7
2020	Fremantle	32	12	0	0	96	61	157	40	21	0.0	0.0	8.0	5.1	13.1	3.3	1.8
2021	Fremantle	32	0	–	–	–	–	–	–	–	–	–	–	–	–	–	–
Career			218	112	88	2518	1677	4195	650	630	0.5	0.4	11.6	7.7	19.2	3.0	2.9
