= 2014 Fremantle Football Club season =

Fremantle Football Club
2014 season
- President: Steve Harris
- Coach: Ross Lyon
- Captain: Matthew Pavlich
- Home ground: Patersons Stadium
- Regular season: 4th
- Finals series: 6th
- Doig Medal: Nat Fyfe (2nd win)
- Leading goalkicker: Hayden Ballantyne (49 goals)
- Highest home attendance: 42,338 (SF vs Port Adelaide; 40,490 (Rd 15 vs West Coast)
- Lowest home attendance: 25,152 (Rd 14 vs Brisbane Lions)
- Average home attendance: 35,930 (home and away)
- Club membership: 48,776

The 2014 Fremantle Football Club season was the club's 20th season of senior competition in the Australian Football League (AFL).

Fremantle reached the finals for the third consecutive year, finishing the home and away season in the fourth position. However, they lost both the qualifying final against Sydney and the semi-final against Port Adelaide to finish sixth overall.

Individually, Nat Fyfe won the Leigh Matthews Trophy, being voted the league's Most Valuable Player and his second consecutive Doig Medal, captain Matthew Pavlich became the first player from a Western Australian-based team to play 300 AFL games and three players, Fyfe, Aaron Sandilands and Hayden Ballantyne, were named in the 2014 All-Australian team.

== Playing list ==
Players are listed by jumper number. 2014 statistics are for AFL regular season and finals series matches during the 2014 AFL season only. Age is as the end of the season, 13 September 2014. Career statistics include a player's complete AFL career, which include games played for other AFL clubs. Statistics are correct as of the end of the 2014 season. Sources: Career and season

No.	Name	Age	Recruited from	Games (2014)	Goals (2014)	Fremantle debut	Fremantle career games	Fremantle career goals	AFL debut	AFL career games	AFL career goals
1	Hayden Ballantyne	27	Peel (WAFL)	20	49	2009	106	180	2009	106	180
2	Anthony Morabito	22	Peel (WAFL)	3	1	2010	26	14	2010	26	14
3	Zac Dawson	28	St Kilda (AFL)	22	1	2012	64	3	2005	141	7
4	Colin Sylvia	28	Melbourne (AFL)	6	1	2014	6	1	2004	163	130
5	Garrick Ibbotson	26	East Fremantle (WAFL)	12	0	2007	127	21	2007	127	21
6	Danyle Pearce	28	Port Adelaide (AFL)	24	19	2013	49	29	2005	203	105
7	Nat Fyfe	22	Claremont (WAFL)	20	24	2010	92	78	2010	92	78
8	Nick Suban	24	North Ballarat Rebels (TAC Cup)	21	11	2009	105	45	2009	105	45
9	Matthew de Boer	24	Claremont (WAFL)	14	4	2009	115	43	2009	115	43
10	Michael Walters	23	Swan Districts (WAFL)	8	15	2009	50	97	2009	50	97
11	Tom Sheridan	20	Calder Cannons (TAC Cup)	8	4	2012	19	10	2012	19	10
12	Jonathon Griffin	28	Adelaide (AFL)	1	0	2011	28	11	2007	69	18
13	Tendai Mzungu	28	Perth (WAFL)	23	12	2011	86	52	2011	86	52
14	Josh Simpson	20	East Fremantle (WAFL)	1	1	2013	2	1	2013	2	1
15	Ryan Crowley	30	Calder Cannons (TAC Cup)	24	8	2005	188	116	2005	188	116
16	David Mundy	29	Murray Bushrangers (TAC Cup)	24	11	2005	210	82	2005	210	82
17	Hayden Crozier	20	Eastern Ranges (TAC Cup)	11	8	2012	23	18	2012	23	18
18	Luke McPharlin	32	Hawthorn (AFL)	13	1	2002	226	112	2000	238	115
19	Scott Gumbleton	26	Essendon (AFL)	0	0	N/A	0	0	2007	35	45
20	Matt Taberner	21	Murray Bushrangers (TAC Cup)	9	7	2013	13	9	2013	13	9
21	Michael Barlow	26	Werribee (VFL)	19	18	2010	89	59	2010	89	59
22	Tanner Smith	20	North Ballarat Rebels (TAC Cup)	0	0	2013	1	0	2013	1	0
23	Chris Mayne	25	Perth (WAFL)	23	13	2008	128	150	2008	128	150
24	Max Duffy	21	East Fremantle (WAFL)	2	2	2014	2	2	2014	2	2
25	Alex Pearce	19	Ulverstone (NTFL)	0	0	N/A	0	0	N/A	0	0
26	Kepler Bradley	28	Essendon (AFL)	0	0	2008	68	73	2004	117	87
27	Lachie Neale	21	Glenelg (SANFL)	23	8	2012	46	20	2012	46	20
28	Brady Grey	19	Burnie Dockers Football Club (TFL)	0	0	N/A	0	0	N/A	0	0
29	Matthew Pavlich	32	Woodville-West Torrens (SANFL)	22	46	2000	313	629	2000	313	629
30	Zac Clarke	24	Oakleigh Chargers (TAC Cup)	21	12	2009	74	39	2009	74	39
31	Aaron Sandilands	31	East Fremantle (WAFL)	23	8	2003	216	83	2003	216	83
32	Stephen Hill	24	West Perth (WAFL)	20	18	2009	128	83	2009	128	83
33	Cameron Sutcliffe	22	Woodville-West Torrens (SANFL)	24	4	2012	47	13	2012	47	13
34	Lee Spurr	27	Central District (SANFL)	24	3	2012	60	5	2012	60	5
35	Michael Apeness	19	Eastern Ranges (TAC Cup)	2	0	2014	2	0	2014	2	0
36	Alex Silvagni	26	Casey Scorpions (VFL)	7	0	2010	46	10	2010	46	10
37	Michael Johnson	29	Perth (WAFL)	18	3	2005	190	62	2005	190	62
38	Jack Hannath	23	Central District (SANFL)	3	0	2013	15	7	2013	15	7
39	Sam Menegola	22	East Fremantle (WAFL)	0	0	N/A	0	0	N/A	0	0
40	Craig Moller	20	Sydney Uni (NEAFL)	0	0	2013	1	0	2013	1	0
41	Paul Duffield	29	South Fremantle (WAFL)	24	6	2006	157	31	2006	157	31
42	Michael Wood	20	Subiaco (WAFL)	0	0	N/A	0	0	N/A	0	0
43	Tom Vandeleur	19	South Fremantle (WAFL)	0	0	N/A	0	0	N/A	0	0
44	Jacob Ballard	20	Northern Blues (VFL)	0	0	N/A	0	0	N/A	0	0
46	Clancee Pearce	23	Swan Districts (WAFL)	9	0	2009	78	31	2009	78	31

=== Additions to list ===
Name	Previous club	Recruiting details
Scott Gumbleton	Essendon (AFL)	Traded for pick 55
Colin Sylvia	Melbourne (AFL)	Free agency recruit
Michael Apeness	Eastern Ranges (TAC Cup)	National draft selection 17
Alex Pearce	Ulverstone/Devonport	National draft selection 37
Brady Grey	Burnie Dockers	National draft selection 58, obtained from Melbourne for Viv Michie
Matt Taberner		Elevated from rookie list (nominally selection 73)
Michael Wood	Subiaco	Rookie draft selection 16
Tom Vandeleur	South Fremantle	Rookie draft selection 32
Jacob Ballard	Northern Blues	Rookie draft selection 47

=== Removal from list ===
Name	Details
Jayden Pitt	Retired
Jesse Crichton	Delisted
Peter Faulks	Delisted
Alex Forster	Delisted
Alex Howson	Delisted
Josh Mellington	Delisted
Haiden Schloithe	Delisted
Viv Michie	Traded to Melbourne for pick 58

== Results ==
=== Win/Loss table ===
Round	1	2	3	4	5	6	7	8	9	10	11	12	13	14	15	16	17	18	19	20	21	22	23	QF	SF	PF	GF
Opponent	Col	**GC**	Haw	**Ess**	Syd	**NM**	WCE	Port	**Gee**	Bye	WB	**Ade**	Rich	**Bris**	**WCE**	Mel	**GWS**	StK	**Carl**	Gee	**Haw**	Bris	**Port**	Syd	**Port**	Eliminated	
Result	70	**48**	−58	**53**	−17	**−13**	19	−18	**32**	Bye	38	**40**	20	**83**	**7**	63	**76**	−58	**5**	−2	**19**	58	**8**	−24	**−22**	Eliminated	
Ladder Pos	1	2	7	5	5	8	6	8	6	7	7	6	5	4	4	4	2	4	4	4	4	4	4	Finals			

+	Win	Qualified for finals
−	Loss	Eliminated

Bold – Home game

=== Ladder ===
2014 AFL ladder
Pos	Team	Pld	W	L	D	PF	PA	PP	Pts	
1	Sydney	22	17	5	0	2126	1488	142.9	68	Finals series
2	Hawthorn (P)	22	17	5	0	2458	1746	140.8	68	Finals series
3	Geelong	22	17	5	0	2033	1787	113.8	68	Finals series
**4**	Fremantle	**22**	**16**	**6**	**0**	**2029**	**1556**	**130.4**	64	Finals series
5	Port Adelaide	22	14	8	0	2180	1678	129.9	56	Finals series
6	North Melbourne	22	14	8	0	2026	1731	117.0	56	Finals series
7	Essendon	22	12	9	1	1828	1719	106.3	50	Finals series
8	Richmond	22	12	10	0	1887	1784	105.8	48	Finals series
9	West Coast	22	11	11	0	2045	1750	116.9	44	
10	Adelaide	22	11	11	0	2175	1907	114.1	44	
11	Collingwood	22	11	11	0	1766	1876	94.1	44	
12	Gold Coast	22	10	12	0	1917	2045	93.7	40	
13	Carlton	22	7	14	1	1891	2107	89.7	30	
14	Western Bulldogs	22	7	15	0	1784	2177	81.9	28	
15	Brisbane Lions	22	7	15	0	1532	2212	69.3	28	
16	Greater Western Sydney	22	6	16	0	1780	2320	76.7	24	
17	Melbourne	22	4	18	0	1336	1954	68.4	16	
18	St Kilda	22	4	18	0	1480	2436	60.8	16	

Source: AFL Tables
Rules for classification: 1) points; 2) percentage; 3) number of points for.
(P) Premiers

== Awards and milestones ==
=== Club awards ===
The Doig Medal was awarded at a function at the Crown Perth on 15 November. Between 1 and 5 votes are awarded to each player by five coaches after each game. Nat Fyfe won his second consecutive Doig Medal. Paul Duffield and Ben Allan, the inaugural club captain, 2001 caretaker coach and board member since 2005 were both awarded life membership.

- Doig Medal: Nat Fyfe, 283 votes
- 2nd: Aaron Sandilands, 251 votes
- 3rd: Stephen Hill, 238 votes
- 4th: David Mundy, 219 votes
- 5th: Hayden Ballantyne, 209 votes
- 6th: Michael Barlow, 205 votes
- 6th: Cameron Sutcliffe, 198 votes
- 9th: Lee Spurr, 193 votes
- 9th: Danyle Pearce, 190 votes
- 10th: Michael Johnson, 179 votes
- Best Clubman: Alex Silvagni
- Beacon Award: Matt Taberner
- Player of the Finals: Cameron Sutcliffe & Zac Dawson

=== Milestones ===
- Round 7 - Aaron Sandilands (200 AFL games)
- Round 9 - Matthew Pavlich (300 AFL games and 600 AFL goals)
- Round 11 - Zac Dawson (50 Fremantle games)
- Round 13 - Hayden Ballantyne (150 AFL goals)
- Round 15 - David Mundy (200 AFL games)
- Round 15 - Lee Spurr (50 AFL games)
- Round 16 - Hayden Ballantyne (100 AFL games)
- Round 18 - Paul Duffield (150 AFL games)
- Round 18 - Nick Suban (100 AFL games)
- Round 23 - Chris Mayne (150 AFL goals)
- Semi Final - Michael Walters (50 AFL games)

=== Debuts ===
- Round 13 - Colin Sylvia
- Round 16 - Michael Apeness
- Round 20 - Max Duffy

=== AFL Awards ===
- Leigh Matthews Trophy (Most Valuable Player at the AFL Players Association awards): Nat Fyfe
- 2014 All-Australian team: Nat Fyfe, Aaron Sandilands and Hayden Ballantyne
- Ross Glendinning Medal:
  - Round 7: Lachie Neale
  - Round 15: Stephen Hill

=== AFL Award Nominations ===
- Round 1 - 2014 AFL Goal of the Year nomination and weekly winner - Hayden Ballantyne
- Round 9 - 2014 AFL Goal of the Year nomination and weekly winner - Hayden Ballantyne
- Round 9 - 2014 AFL Mark of the Year nomination and weekly winner - Nat Fyfe
- Round 18 - 2014 AFL Mark of the Year nomination and weekly winner - Lee Spurr
- Round 20 - 2014 AFL Mark of the Year nomination - Nat Fyfe
- Round 22 - 2014 AFL Rising Star nomination - Matt Taberner
- Round 23 - 2014 AFL Mark of the Year nomination and weekly winner - Zac Dawson
