= 2013 Fremantle Football Club season =

Fremantle Football Club
2013 season
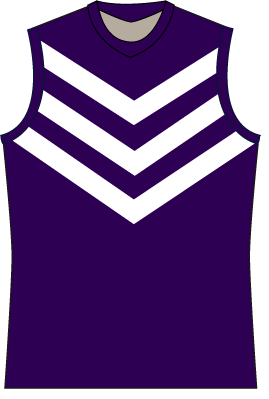
- Fremantle's guernsey for the 2013 season
- President: Steve Harris
- Coach: Ross Lyon (2nd season)
- Captains: Matthew Pavlich (7th season)
- Home ground: Patersons Stadium
- Pre-season competition: 10th
- Regular season: 3rd
- Finals series: 2nd
- Leading goalkicker: Michael Walters (46)
- Highest home attendance: 39,629 vs West Coast (Round 1)
- Average home attendance: 34,266
- Club membership: 43,880

The 2013 Fremantle Football Club season was the club's 19th season of senior competition in the Australian Football League (AFL). It was the club's most successful season to date, recording their second most wins in a season, highest percentage and second highest final ladder position of 3rd. The club won its first ever Qualifying Final, and defeated Sydney in the Preliminary Final at Patersons Stadium and played in its first AFL Grand Final against Hawthorn, losing by 15 points.

== Squad ==
Players are listed by jumper number. 2013 statistics are for AFL regular season and finals series matches during the 2013 AFL season only. Age is as the end of the season, 28 September 2013. Career statistics include a player's complete AFL career, which include games played for other AFL clubs. Statistics are correct as of the end of the 2013 season. Sources: Career and season

No.	Name	Age	Recruited from	Games (2013)	Goals (2013)	Fremantle debut	Fremantle career games	Fremantle career goals	AFL debut	AFL career games	AFL career goals
1	Hayden Ballantyne	26	Peel (WAFL)	21	34	2009	86	131	2009	86	131
2	Anthony Morabito	21	Peel (WAFL)	0	0	2010	23	13	2010	23	13
3	Zac Dawson	27	St Kilda (AFL)	24	0	2012	42	2	2005	119	6
4	Jayden Pitt	20	Geelong Falcons (TAC Cup)	0	0	2011	10	2	2011	10	2
5	Garrick Ibbotson	25	East Fremantle (WAFL)	13	1	2007	115	21	2007	115	21
6	Danyle Pearce	27	Sturt (SANFL)	25	10	2013	25	10	2005	179	86
7	Nathan Fyfe	22	Claremont (WAFL)	22	18	2010	72	54	2010	72	54
8	Nick Suban	23	North Ballarat Rebels (TAC Cup)	22	16	2009	84	34	2009	84	34
9	Matthew de Boer	23	Claremont (WAFL)	25	10	2009	101	39	2009	101	39
10	Michael Walters	22	Swan Districts (WAFL)	21	46	2009	42	82	2009	42	82
11	Tom Sheridan	19	Calder Cannons (TAC Cup)	10	6	2012	11	6	2012	11	6
12	Jonathon Griffin	27	East Fremantle (WAFL)	7	3	2011	27	11	2007	68	18
13	Tendai Mzungu	27	Perth (WAFL)	25	16	2011	63	40	2011	63	40
14	Josh Simpson	19	East Fremantle (WAFL)	1	1	2013	1	1	2013	1	1
15	Ryan Crowley	29	Calder Cannons (TAC Cup)	25	8	2005	164	107	2005	164	107
16	David Mundy	28	Murray Bushrangers (TAC Cup)	22	7	2005	186	71	2005	186	71
17	Hayden Crozier	19	Eastern Ranges (TAC Cup)	9	10	2012	12	10	2012	12	10
18	Luke McPharlin	31	East Fremantle (WAFL)	16	0	2002	213	111	2000	225	114
19	Alex Forster	20	Norwood (SANFL)	1	0	2013	1	0	2013	1	0
20	Viv Michie	21	Oakleigh Chargers (TAC Cup)	1	0	2013	1	0	2013	1	0
21	Michael Barlow	25	Werribee (VFL)	24	14	2010	70	41	2010	70	41
22	Tanner Smith	19	North Ballarat Rebels (TAC Cup)	1	0	2013	1	0	2013	1	0
23	Chris Mayne	24	Perth (WAFL)	24	37	2008	105	137	2008	105	137
24	Max Duffy	20	East Fremantle (WAFL)	0	0	N/A	0	0	N/A	0	0
25	Josh Mellington	20	Murray Bushrangers (TAC Cup)	1	0	2011	6	5	2011	6	5
26	Kepler Bradley	27	West Perth (WAFL)	5	7	2008	68	73	2004	117	87
27	Lachie Neale	20	Glenelg (SANFL)	10	8	2012	23	12	2012	23	12
28	Peter Faulks	25	Williamstown (VFL)	1	0	2011	3	0	2011	3	0
29	Matthew Pavlich	31	Woodville-West Torrens (SANFL)	12	25	2000	291	583	2000	291	583
30	Zac Clarke	23	Oakleigh Chargers (TAC Cup)	17	8	2009	53	27	2009	53	27
31	Aaron Sandilands	30	East Fremantle (WAFL)	10	3	2003	193	75	2003	193	75
32	Stephen Hill	23	West Perth (WAFL)	19	12	2009	108	65	2009	108	65
33	Cameron Sutcliffe	21	Woodville-West Torrens (SANFL)	19	8	2012	23	9	2012	23	9
34	Lee Spurr	26	Central District (SANFL)	23	2	2012	36	2	2012	36	2
35	Haiden Schloithe	20	South Fremantle (WAFL)	0	0	N/A	0	0	N/A	0	0
36	Alex Silvagni	25	Casey Scorpions (VFL)	10	5	2010	39	10	2010	39	10
37	Michael Johnson	28	Perth (WAFL)	23	5	2005	172	59	2005	172	59
38	Jack Hannath	22	Central District (SANFL)	12	7	2013	12	7	2013	12	7
39	Sam Menegola	21	East Fremantle (WAFL)	0	0	N/A	0	0	N/A	0	0
40	Craig Moller	19	Sydney Uni (NEAFL)	1	0	2013	1	0	2013	1	0
41	Paul Duffield	28	South Fremantle (WAFL)	22	4	2006	133	27	2006	133	27
42	Matt Taberner	20	Murray Bushrangers (TAC Cup)	4	2	2013	4	2	2013	4	2
43	Alex Howson	19	East Fremantle (WAFL)	0	0	N/A	0	0	N/A	0	0
44	Jesse Crichton	22	North Launceston (TFL)	1	0	2010	18	3	2010	18	3
46	Clancee Pearce	22	Swan Districts (WAFL)	19	2	2009	69	31	2009	69	31

=== Squad changes ===
The 2012 AFL draft contained a free agency trade provision for the first time. Fremantle was the first club to lodge a bid for a free agent when the put in a four-year offer to recruit Danyle Pearce from Port Adelaide. As a restricted free agent, Port could have matched Fremantle's offer, but chose not to.

During the trading and drafting period, the futures of Adam McPhee and Jack Anthony at the club were in doubt, however McPhee signed a one-year contract extension in October. On 20 November, two days before the National Draft, McPhee announced that he was retiring to return to Victoria and Anthony was delisted, despite having a year to go on his contract.

==== In to squad ====
Name	Previous club	Recruiting details
Danyle Pearce	Port Adelaide	Restricted free agent
Josh Simpson	East Fremantle	AFL National Draft, pick #17 (first round)
Tanner Smith	North Ballarat Rebels	AFL National Draft, pick #36 (second round)
Max Duffy	East Fremantle	AFL National Draft, pick #39 (second round)
Clancee Pearce	Fremantle	AFL National Draft, pick #78 (rookie elevation)
Lee Spurr	Fremantle	AFL National Draft, pick #93 (rookie elevation)
Jack Hannath	Central District	AFL Pre-Season Draft, pick #8 (first round)
Jesse Crichton	Fremantle (redrafted)	AFL Pre-Season Draft, pick #14 (second round)
Matt Taberner	Murray Bushrangers	AFL Rookie Draft, pick #11 (first round)
Alex Howson	East Fremantle	AFL Rookie Draft, pick #25 (second round)
Craig Moller	Sydney Uni	AFL Rookie Draft, pick #46 (NSW AFL Scholarship)

==== Out of squad ====
Name	New Club	Details
Antoni Grover	N/A	Retired
Adam McPhee	N/A	Retired
Jay van Berlo	N/A	Delisted
Dylan Roberton	N/A (recruited by St Kilda)	Delisted
Nick Lower	N/A (recruited by Western Bulldogs)	Delisted
Jesse Crichton	N/A (redrafted by Fremantle)	Delisted
Jack Anthony	N/A	Delisted
Greg Broughton	Gold Coast	Traded with pick #58 to Gold Coast for pick 36
Gavin Roberts	N/A	Delisted
Jordan Wilson-King	N/A	Delisted

== Season summary ==
=== Pre-season matches ===
Fremantle's 2013 NAB Cup fixture (Week 1 – Lightning matches)
Round	Date and local time	Opponent	Scores^{[a]}			Venue	Attendance	Ladder position	Ref
Round	Date and local time	Opponent	Home	Away	Result	Venue	Attendance	Ladder position	Ref
1	Saturday, 16 February (4:40 pm)	Geelong	0.7.6 (48)	0.4.6 (30)	Won by 18 points	Patersons Stadium [H]	21,935	10th	
1	Saturday, 16 February (6:50 pm)	West Coast	0.2.4 (16)	1.4.7 (24)	Lost by 8 points	Patersons Stadium [H]	21,935	10th	

Fremantle's 2013 NAB Cup fixture (Weeks 2 & 3 – Full-length matches)
Round	Date and local time	Opponent	Scores^{[a]}			Venue	Attendance	Ladder position	Ref
Round	Date and local time	Opponent	Home	Away	Result	Venue	Attendance	Ladder position	Ref
2	Sunday, 3 March (4:40 pm)	Carlton	0.18.16 (124)	1.6.9 (54)	Lost by 70 points	Etihad Stadium [A]	9,402	16th	
3	Saturday, 9 March (3:30 pm)	Western Bulldogs	0.23.8 (146)	0.5.7 (37)	Won by 109 points	Rushton Park [H]	4,655	10th	

=== Regular season ===
Fremantle's 2013 AFL season fixture
Round	Date and local time	Opponent	Scores^{[a]}			Venue	Attendance	Ladder position	Ref
Round	Date and local time	Opponent	Home	Away	Result	Venue	Attendance	Ladder position	Ref
1	Saturday, 23 March (4:40 pm)	West Coast	16.12 (108)	11.14 (80)	won by 28	Patersons Stadium	39629	5th	
2	Saturday, 6 April (2:10 PM)	Western Bulldogs	11.12 (78)	16.1 (106)	won by 28	Etihad Stadium	19210	4th	
3	Friday, 12 April (6:40 PM)	Essendon	9.14 (68)	10.12 (72)	lost by 4	Patersons Stadium	35963	7th	
4	Saturday, 20 April (1:45 PM)	Hawthorn	18.1 (118)	11.1 (76)	lost by 42	Aurora Stadium	12619	9th	
5	Friday, 26 April (6:45 PM)	Richmond	12.9 (81)	12.8 (80)	won by 1	Patersons Stadium	36365	7th	
6	Saturday, 4 May (7:40 PM)	Gold Coast	7.12 (54)	15.9 (99)	won by 45	Metricon Stadium	10552	6th	
7	Saturday, 11 May (5:40 PM)	Collingwood	15.1 (100)	10.13 (73)	won by 27	Patersons Stadium	37214	6th	
8	Saturday, 18 May (7:40 PM)	Sydney	11.4 (70)	9.16 (70)	draw	SCG	22546	5th	
9	Sunday, 26 May (2:40 PM)	Melbourne	19.16 (130)	6.4 (40)	won by 90	Patersons Stadium	32950	4th	
10	Saturday, 1 June (1:40 PM)	Adelaide	8.11 (59)	10.6 (66)	won by 7	AAMI Stadium	27684	4th	
11	Bye							5th	
12	Saturday, 15 June (2:40 PM)	Brisbane Lions	12.14 (86)	6.1 (46)	won by 40	Patersons Stadium	33384	5th	
13	Sunday, 23 June (1:20 PM)	North Melbourne	10.7 (67)	4.5 (29)	won by 38	Patersons Stadium	31637	3rd	
14	Saturday, 29 June (7:40 PM)	Geelong	11.19 (85)	7.2 (44)	lost by 41	Simonds Stadium	26743	5th	
15	Sunday, 7 July (1:20 PM)	St Kilda	15.1 (100)	11.4 (70)	won by 30	Patersons Stadium	34064	5th	
16	Sunday, 14 July (2:40 PM)	West Coast	14.9 (93)	19.7 (121)	won by 28	Patersons Stadium	39839	5th	
17	Sunday, 21 July (1:10 PM)	Richmond	12.12 (84)	8.9 (57)	lost by 27	MCG	40125	5th	
18	Saturday, 27 July (5:40 PM)	Adelaide	11.9 (75)	7.11 (53)	won by 22	Patersons Stadium	28765	5th	
19	Saturday, 3 August (7:40 PM)	Carlton	12.8 (80)	17.14 (116)	won by 36	Etihad Stadium	30457	4th	
20	Sunday, 11 August (2:40 PM)	Greater Western Sydney	24.13 (157)	6.8 (44)	won by 113	Patersons Stadium	31390	4th	
21	Sunday, 18 August (1:10 PM)	Melbourne	5.8 (38)	20.13 (133)	won by 95	MCG	13768	4th	
22	Saturday, 24 August (5:40 PM)	Port Adelaide	21.8 (134)	9.6 (60)	won by 74	Patersons Stadium	35565	3rd	
23	Saturday, 31 August (1:45 PM)	St Kilda	16.16 (112)	6.5 (41)	lost by 71	Etihad Stadium	22476	3rd	

=== Finals series ===
Fremantle's 2013 AFL finals series fixture
Round	Date and local time	Opponent	Scores^{[a]}			Venue	Attendance	Ref
Round	Date and local time	Opponent	Home	Away	Result	Venue	Attendance	Ref
2nd Qualifying Final	Saturday, 7 September (2:20 pm)	Geelong	9.18 (72)	12.15 (87)	won by 15	Simonds Stadium	32815	
2nd Preliminary Final	Saturday, 21 September (5:50 pm)	Sydney	14.15 (99)	11.8 (74)	won by 25	Patersons Stadium	43249	
Grand Final	Saturday, 28 September (2:30 pm)	Hawthorn	11.11 (77)	8.14 (62)	lost by 15	MCG	100007	

== Ladder ==
2013 AFL ladder
Pos	Team	Pld	W	L	D	PF	PA	PP	Pts	
1	Hawthorn (P)	22	19	3	0	2523	1859	135.7	76	Finals series
2	Geelong	22	18	4	0	2409	1776	135.6	72	Finals series
3	Fremantle	22	16	5	1	2035	1518	134.1	66	Finals series
4	Sydney	22	15	6	1	2244	1694	132.5	62	Finals series
5	Richmond	22	15	7	0	2154	1754	122.8	60	Finals series
6	Collingwood	22	14	8	0	2148	1868	115.0	56	Finals series
7	Port Adelaide	22	12	10	0	2051	2002	102.4	48	Finals series
8	Carlton	22	11	11	0	2125	1992	106.7	44	Finals series
9	Essendon	22	14	8	0	2145	2000	107.3	56 (Note: Essendon was relegated to ninth due to irregularities in its supplements program during the 2012 season.)	
10	North Melbourne	22	10	12	0	2307	1930	119.5	40	
11	Adelaide	22	10	12	0	2064	1909	108.1	40	
12	Brisbane Lions	22	10	12	0	1922	2144	89.6	40	
13	West Coast	22	9	13	0	2038	2139	95.3	36	
14	Gold Coast	22	8	14	0	1918	2091	91.7	32	
15	Western Bulldogs	22	8	14	0	1926	2262	85.1	32	
16	St Kilda	22	5	17	0	1751	2120	82.6	20	
17	Melbourne	22	2	20	0	1455	2691	54.1	8	
18	Greater Western Sydney	22	1	21	0	1524	2990	51.0	4	

Source: AFL Tables
Rules for classification: 1) points; 2) percentage; 3) number of points for.
(P) Premiers

== Awards, Records & Milestones ==
=== Club awards ===
The Doig Medal was awarded at a function at the Perth Convention Exhibition Centre on 16 November. Between 1 and 5 votes are awarded to each player by five coaches after each game. Nathan Fyfe won his first Doig Medal, after previously finishing second in 2011.

- Doig Medal: Nathan Fyfe, 263 votes
- 2nd: David Mundy, 246 votes
- 3rd: Michael Johnson, 239 votes
- 4th: Ryan Crowley, 238 votes
- 5th: Lee Spurr, 226 votes
- 6th: Chris Mayne, 219 votes
- 7th: Michael Barlow, 216 votes
- 8th: Hayden Ballantyne, 192 votes
- 9th: Michael Walters, 186 votes
- 10th: Tendai Mzungu, 180 votes
- Best Clubman: Lee Spurr
- Beacon Award: Cameron Sutcliffe

=== Milestones ===
- Round 1 - Michael Johnson (150 AFL games)
- Round 3 - Luke McPharlin (200 Fremantle games)
- Round 4 - Michael Barlow (50 AFL games)
- Round 4 - Ryan Crowley (100 AFL goals)
- Round 4 - Hayden Ballantyne (100 AFL goals)
- Round 12 - Ryan Crowley (150 AFL games)
- Round 13 - Tendai Mzungu (50 AFL games)
- Round 16 - Stephen Hill (100 AFL games)
- Round 20 - Chris Mayne (100 AFL games)
- Round 22 - Zac Clarke (50 AFL games)
- 2nd Preliminary Final - Matt de Boer (100 AFL games)

=== Debuts ===
- Round 1 - Danyle Pearce
- Round 4 - Tanner Smith
- Round 5 - Jack Hannath
- Round 13 - Matt Taberner
- Round 14 - Viv Michie
- Round 23 - Josh Simpson
- Round 23 - Alex Forster
- Round 23 - Craig Moller

=== AFL Awards ===
- Herald Sun Player of the Year - Nathan Fyfe (tied with Gary Ablett, Jr.)
- 2013 All-Australian team - Michael Johnson
- 2013 All-Australian squad - Nathan Fyfe, Chris Mayne, David Mundy and Michael Walters
- 2013 22under22 team - Nathan Fyfe and Michael Walters
- ABC Footballer of the Year - Nathan Fyfe (tied with Dane Swan)
- 720 ABC Perth Geoff Christian Medal - Nathan Fyfe
- Ross Glendinning Medal:
  - Round 1 - David Mundy and Michael Barlow (tie)
  - Round 16 - Michael Barlow

=== AFL Award Nominations ===
- Round 13 - 2013 AFL Mark of the Year nomination and weekly winner - Nathan Fyfe
- Round 16 - 2013 AFL Mark of the Year nomination - Tendai Mzungu
- Round 16 - 2013 AFL Mark of the Year nomination - Chris Mayne
- Round 20 - 2013 AFL Goal of the Year nomination and weekly winner - Hayden Ballantyne
- Round 21 - 2013 AFL Mark of the Year nomination and weekly winner - Zac Clarke

== Notes ==
Key

- H Home match.
- A Away match.

Notes

- **^{a}** Fremantle's scores are indicated in **bold** font.
