= 2015 Fremantle Football Club season =

Fremantle Football Club
2015 season
- President: Steve Harris
- Coach: Ross Lyon
- Captain: Matthew Pavlich
- Home ground: Domain Stadium (Capacity: 43,500)
- AFL season: 1st (1st McClelland Trophy)
- Finals series: 3rd
- Best and Fairest: Aaron Sandilands
- Leading goalkicker: Michael Walters (44 goals)
- Highest home attendance: Home and away: 41,959; Finals: 41,508
- Average home attendance: Home and away: 36209; Finals: 40,789

The Fremantle Football Club's 2015 season was their 21st season in the Australian Football League (AFL). The club set a number of records during the year including winning their first McClelland Trophy for finishing first on the ladder after the completion of the home-and-away season and a club record of 17 wins during the home–and–away season.

== Playing list ==
Between the conclusion of the 2014 season and the commencement of the 2015 season, Fremantle did not complete any trades nor recruit any free agents in the AFL trade period, despite being reported to have attempted to recruit key position players James Frawley and Aaron Black.

Key defender Luke McPharlin signed a one-year contract extension during the trade period.

=== Recruits and departures ===
At the national draft, Fremantle was expected to recruit a tall player, but instead drafted four smaller midfield or forward line players. Two of the drafted players, Lachie Weller and Ed Langdon are younger brothers of current AFL players, St Kilda's Maverick Weller and Collingwood's Tom Langdon. In the rookie draft, Fremantle selected Ethan Hughes, a half-back flanker originally from Bunbury, before redrafting Tanner Smith. With their final selection they selected Irishman Sean Hurley, the club's first ever international recruit.

Recruits				Departures
Player	Previous club	League	Recruited via	Player	Reason
Lachie Weller	Southport/Broadbeach	NEAFL	#13, National draft	Kepler Bradley	Retirement from AFL
Connor Blakely	Swan Districts	WAFL	#34, National draft	Scott Gumbleton	Retirement from AFL
Ed Langdon	Sandringham Dragons	WAFL	#54, National draft	Josh Simpson	Delisted
Josh Deluca	Subiaco	WAFL	#68, National draft	Sam Menegola	Delisted (from rookie list)
Ethan Hughes	Swan Districts	WAFL	#13, Rookie draft	Michael Wood	Delisted (from rookie list)
Tanner Smith	Fremantle	AFL	#31, Rookie draft (redrafted)	Tanner Smith	Delisted (redrafted in the rookie draft)
Sean Hurley	Kildare GAA	GAA	#48, Rookie draft

=== Ryan Crowley positive drugs test ===
In March 2015, Crowley was not chosen to play in any of Fremantle's pre-season games. After being left out of the team that would travel to Sydney for the second game, it was announced that he was unavailable for selection due to undisclosed personal issues. Three days later it was revealed that Crowley had tested position to a banned substance during the 2014 AFL season and had been serving a provisional suspension since September 2014. The sample was taken after Fremantle's Round 17 win over Greater Western Sydney and the commencement of the provisional suspension commenced after the confirmation tests (also known as B-sample) was completed in mid September. The banned substance has not been named, but was confirmed to have come from a painkiller that was not prescribed by the club doctor. He appeared before the AFL Tribunal in May 2015, and was found guilty and suspended for twelve months, backdated to the beginning of his provisional suspension. He became eligible to play again on 25 September 2015.

=== Full squad ===
Fremantle Football Club
Senior list		Rookie list	Staff
1 Hayden Ballantyne; 2 Anthony Morabito; 3 Zac Dawson; 4 Colin Sylvia (ret); 5 Garrick Ibbotson; 6 Danyle Pearce; 7 Nat Fyfe; 8 Nick Suban; 9 Matt de Boer; 10 Michael Walters; 11 Tom Sheridan; 12 Jonathon Griffin; 13 Tendai Mzungu; 14 Lachie Weller; 15 Ryan Crowley; 16 David Mundy; 17 Hayden Crozier; 18 Luke McPharlin; 19 Connor Blakely; 20 Matt Taberner	21 Michael Barlow; 23 Chris Mayne; 24 Max Duffy; 25 Alex Pearce; 26 Ed Langdon; 27 Lachie Neale; 28 Brady Grey; 29 Matthew Pavlich (c); 30 Zac Clarke; 31 Aaron Sandilands; 32 Stephen Hill; 33 Cameron Sutcliffe; 34 Lee Spurr; 35 Michael Apeness; 36 Alex Silvagni; 37 Michael Johnson; 38 Jack Hannath; 39 Josh Deluca; 41 Paul Duffield; 46 Clancee Pearce	22 Tanner Smith; 40 Craig Moller (B); 42 Ethan Hughes; 43 Tom Vandeleur; 44 Jacob Ballard; 45 Sean Hurley (B)	Head coach: Ross Lyon; Assistant coaches: Mark Stone (stoppages); Michael Prior (defence); Peter Sumich (forwards); Brett Kirk (midfield); Simon Eastaugh (ruck); Simon Lloyd (development); Marc Webb (development); Roger Hayden (skills development); Legend: (c) Captain(s); (vc) Vice-captain(s); Upgraded rookie during season; (ret) Retired during season; (B) B-class rookie; Updated: 3 December 2014; Source(s): Playing list, Coaching staff, Full coaching staff

== Season summary ==
=== Pre-season matches ===
Rd	Day	Date	Local time	Opponent	Fremantle's score	Opponent's score	Margin	Venue	Attendance	Match report
1	Thursday	5 March 2015	4:10 pm	Melbourne	0.9.7 (61)	0.6.7 (43)	+18	Fremantle Oval	8000 (approx)	Report
2	Sunday	15 March 2015	4:10 pm	Sydney	1.6.11 (56)	1.7.14 (65)	-9	Drummoyne Oval, Sydney	4,343	Report
3	Sunday	22 March 2015	4:10 pm	West Coast	1.13.17 (104)	1.11.10 (85)	+19	Domain Stadium	16,032	Report

=== Premiership Season ===
When the 2015 AFL season fixtures were released in October 2014, Fremantle were drawn to play Port Adelaide in the opening round, a repeat of the semi-final that ended their 2014 season. The opening month was considered very difficult, with an away game against Geelong, an away Western Derby and a home game on Anzac Day against the other team that beat Fremantle in last year's finals, Sydney. Fremantle's game against Hawthorn was again to be played at Aurora Stadium in Launceston, Tasmania.

==== Home and away season ====
Rd	Day	Date	Local time	Opponent	Fremantle's score	Opponent's score	Margin	Venue	Attendance	Ladder position
1	Sunday	5 April 2015	5:40 pm	Port Adelaide	11.9 (75)	10.8 (68)	+7	Domain Stadium	34,099	9
2	Sunday	12 April 2015	1:10 pm	Geelong	15.14 (104)	9.6 (60)	+44	Simonds Stadium	23,723	4
3	Sunday	19 April 2015	2:40 pm	West Coast	17.9 (111)	12.9 (81)	+30	Domain Stadium (A)	39,138	3
4	Saturday	25 April 2015	6:40 pm	Sydney	11.8 (74)	8.12 (60)	+14	Domain Stadium	39,009	1
5	Sunday	3 May 2015	1:10 pm	Melbourne	18.10 (118)	6.14 (50)	+68	MCG	22,892	1
6	Saturday	9 May 2015	6:10 pm	Essendon	12.8 (80)	7.10 (52)	+28	Domain Stadium	37,535	1
7	Sunday	17 May 2015	1:10 pm	Western Bulldogs	15.11 (101)	14.4 (88)	+13	Etihad Stadium	18,710	1
8	Saturday	23 May 2015	5:40 pm	North Melbourne	17.13 (115)	5.12 (42)	+73	Domain Stadium	35,836	1
9	Saturday	30 May 2015	7:10 pm	Adelaide	10.8 (68)	7.15 (57)	+11	Adelaide Oval	45,518	1
10	Friday	5 June 2015	6:10 pm	Richmond	10.10 (70)	15.7 (97)	-27	Domain Stadium	38,019	1
11	Saturday	13 June 2015	1:40 pm	Gold Coast	6.17 (53)	7.4 (46)	+7	Metricon Stadium	8,911	1
12	Bye									
13	Thursday	25 June 2015	6:10 pm	Collingwood	12.8 (80)	1.7 (73)	+7	Domain Stadium	37,145	1
14	Sunday	5 July 2015	2:40 pm	Brisbane Lions	13.6 (84)	7.6 (48)	+46	Domain Stadium	32,970	1
15	Sunday	12 July 2015	3:20 pm	Hawthorn	6.7 (43)	17.13 (115)	-72	Aurora Stadium	16,792	1
16	Saturday	18 July 2015	5:40 pm	Carlton	13.17 (95)	8.5 (53)	+42	Domain Stadium	33,581	1
17	Saturday	25 July 2015	4:35 pm	Richmond	12.10 (82)	10.18 (78)	+4	MCG	39,777	1
18	Sunday	2 August 2015	2:40 pm	Greater Western Sydney	12.12 (84)	9.9 (63)	+21	Domain Stadium	34,626	1
19	Sunday	9 August 2015	4:40 pm	St Kilda	15.6 (96)	8.11 (59)	+37	Etihad Stadium	16,419	1
20	Sunday	16 August 2015	2:40 pm	West Coast	11.14 (80)	15.14 (104)	-24	Domain Stadium	41,959	1
21	Sunday	23 August 2015	1:10 pm	North Melbourne	12.11 (83)	14.10 (94)	-11	Etihad Stadium	23,857	1
22	Sunday	30 August 2015	2:40 pm	Melbourne	17.6 (108)	8.6 (54)	+54	Domain Stadium	33,529	1
23	Saturday	5 September 2015	3:20 pm	Port Adelaide	8.5 (53)	18.14 (122)	-69	Adelaide Oval	38,633	1
All games at Domain Stadium are Fremantle home games except for the one game marked (A). That game, and all others, are away games. Source

==== Finals ====
Rd	Day	Date	Local time	Opponent	Fremantle's score	Opponent's score	Margin	Venue	Attendance
Qualifying final	Saturday	12 September 2015	1:20 pm	Sydney	10.9 (69)	7.18 (60)	+9	Domain Stadium	40,071
Preliminary final	Friday	25 September 2015	6:20pm	Hawthorn	10.7 (67)	15.4 (94)	-27	Domain Stadium	41,508

== Ladder ==
Pos	Team	Pld	W	L	D	PF	PA	PP	Pts	Qualification
1	Fremantle	22	17	5	0	1857	1564	118.7	68	Finals series
2	West Coast	22	16	5	1	2330	1572	148.2	66	Finals series
3	Hawthorn (P)	22	16	6	0	2452	1548	158.4	64	Finals series
4	Sydney	22	16	6	0	2006	1578	127.1	64	Finals series
5	Richmond	22	15	7	0	1930	1568	123.1	60	Finals series
6	Western Bulldogs	22	14	8	0	2101	1825	115.1	56	Finals series
7	Adelaide	21	13	8	0	2107	1821	115.7	54 (Note: The round 14 match between Adelaide and Geelong was cancelled due to the death of Adelaide coach Phil Walsh, and both teams were awarded two premiership points each.)	Finals series
8	North Melbourne	22	13	9	0	2062	1937	106.5	52	Finals series
9	Port Adelaide	22	12	10	0	2002	1874	106.8	48	
10	Geelong	21	11	9	1	1853	1833	101.1	48	
11	Greater Western Sydney	22	11	11	0	1872	1891	99.0	44	
12	Collingwood	22	10	12	0	1972	1856	106.3	40	
13	Melbourne	22	7	15	0	1573	2044	77.0	28	
14	St Kilda	22	6	15	1	1695	2162	78.4	26	
15	Essendon	22	6	16	0	1580	2134	74.0	24	
16	Gold Coast	22	4	17	1	1633	2240	72.9	18	
17	Brisbane Lions	22	4	18	0	1557	2306	67.5	16	
18	Carlton	22	4	18	0	1525	2354	64.8	16	

Rules for classification: 1) points; 2) percentage; 3) number of points for.
(P) Premiers

== Awards, Records & Milestones ==
=== Awards ===
- 2015 Brownlow Medal: Nat Fyfe
- 2015 All-Australian team: Nat Fyfe and David Mundy
- 2015 Leigh Matthews Trophy: Nat Fyfe
- 2015 22 Under 22 team: Lachie Neale

=== Milestones ===
Player	Round	Milestone
Cameron Sutcliffe	3	50th game
Michael Walters	3	100th goal
Lachie Neale	4	50th game
Nat Fyfe	8	100th game
Matthew Pavlich	9	650th goal
Michael Johnson	10	200th game
Michael Barlow	11	100th game
Luke McPharlin	17	250th AFL game
Stephen Hill	QF	150th game
Garrick Ibbotson	QF	150th game

=== Debuts ===
Player	Round	Opponent	Ground	Result
Alex Pearce	6	Essendon	Domain Stadium	+28
Lachie Weller	18	Greater Western Sydney	Domain Stadium	+21
Ed Langdon	22	Melbourne	Domain Stadium	+54
Connor Blakely	23	Port Adelaide	Adelaide Oval	-69
Brady Grey	23	Port Adelaide	Adelaide Oval	-69
Ethan Hughes	23	Port Adelaide	Adelaide Oval	-69
Jacob Ballard	23	Port Adelaide	Adelaide Oval	-69

== Match Review Panel charges ==
Updated as of Round 21, 2015 season

Match Review Panel (MRP) and AFL Tribunal cases involving Fremantle players during the 2015 AFL season
Round	Player	Charge category	Victim (club)	Verdict	Fine (A$)	Suspension	Source
Round	Player	Charge category	Victim (club)	Verdict	Sanction		Source
NC3	Michael Walters	rough conduct	Craig Bird (Sydney)	Dismissed	—N/a	—N/a	
1	Zac Clarke	tripping	Jared Polec (Port Adelaide)	Guilty (early plea)	$1,000	—N/a	
2	Hayden Ballantyne	rough conduct	Harry Taylor (Geelong)	Guilty (early plea)	—N/a	2 matches	
4	Matt de Boer	striking	Harry Cunningham (Sydney)	Guilty (early plea)	$1000	—N/a	
7	Nat Fyfe	tripping	Jake Stringer (Western Bulldogs)	Guilty (early plea)	$1000	—N/a	
10	Michael Walters	engaging in a melee	Richmond	Guilty (early plea)	$1500	—N/a	
10	Danyle Pearce	engaging in a melee	Richmond	Guilty (early plea)	$1500	—N/a	
10	Nick Suban	engaging in a melee	Richmond	Guilty (early plea)	$1000	—N/a	
11	Matthew Pavlich	striking	Trent McKenzie (Gold Coast)	Guilty (early plea)	$1000	—N/a	
14	Hayden Ballantyne	wrestling	Darcy Gardiner (Brisbane Lions)	Guilty (early plea)	$1000	—N/a	
15	Nat Fyfe	rough conduct	Taylor Duryea (Hawthorn)	Guilty (early plea)	$1500	—N/a	
16	Hayden Ballantyne	wrestling	Dylan Buckley (Carlton)	Guilty (early plea)	$1500	—N/a	
18	Zac Dawson	striking	Jeremy Cameron (Greater Western Sydney)	Guilty (early plea)	—N/a	2 weeks	
18	David Mundy	engaging in a melee	Greater Western Sydney	Guilty (early plea)	$1000	—N/a	
18	Zac Dawson	engaging in a melee	Greater Western Sydney	Guilty (early plea)	$1000	—N/a	
20	Alex Silvagni	striking	Jamie Cripps (West Coast)	Guilty (early plea)	—N/a	4 weeks	
21	David Mundy	striking	Brent Harvey (North Melbourne)	Guilty (early plea)	$1000	—N/a	
21	Nat Fyfe	forceful contact from front-on	Ben Jacobs (North Melbourne)	Dismissed	—N/a	—N/a	
22	Nick Suban	wrestling	Jack Viney (Melbourne)	Guilty (early plea)	$1000	—N/a	
