= Rookie list =

Australian rules football player type

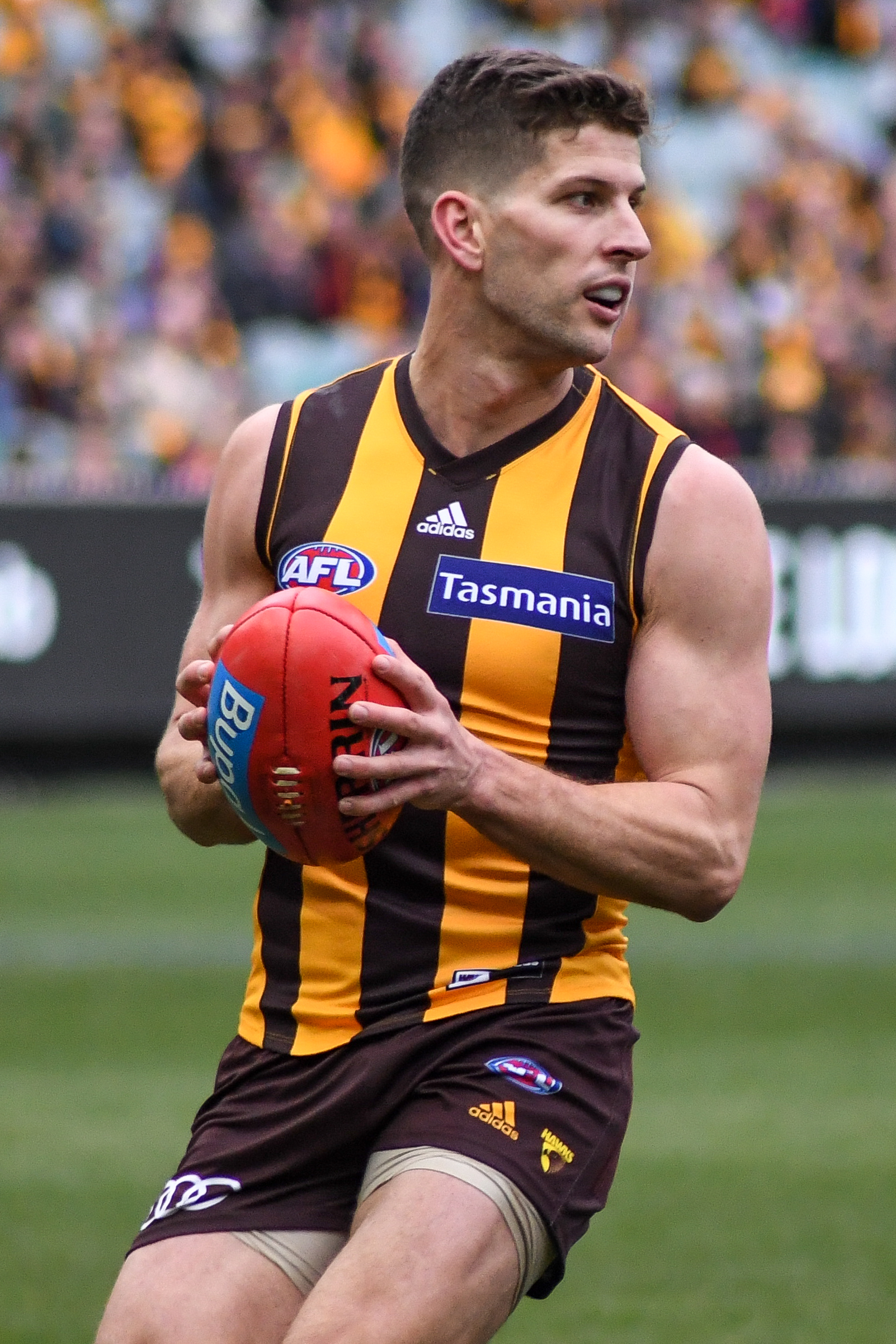
Luke Breust holds the record for most AFL games played by a player recruited from the rookie draft, with 300 matches and counting.

The rookie list is a means for Australian Football League (AFL) clubs to maintain additional players outside the 38-man primary or senior list.

== Recruitment ==
There are two categories of rookie: Category A and Category B. Category A primarily represents players with a traditional Australian rules football development; Category B rookies are players from non-traditional recruiting backgrounds. Category A rookies are usually placed on the list via the rookie draft, which occurs annually during the off-season, immediately after the pre-season draft. As is the case with the AFL's other drafts, clubs are given the opportunity to select rookies in reverse ladder order, based on the previous season's results.

Several types of Category A rookies may be recruited directly by the clubs, without the need to put up for draft (although all such players are recorded against a late draft pick as a formality). This includes:

- International rookies
- Father-son selections – which are permitted only if the player has nominated for and not been selected in a National Draft

=== Category B rookies ===
Each club is permitted to recruit up to two "Category B" rookies. Category B rookies are recruited directly rather than drafted, and represent players from non-traditional recruiting backgrounds. Players who may be recruited as Category B rookies include:

- International players, who are neither Australian citizens nor residents
- Players from the New South Wales scholarship program
- Players from the International scholarship program
- Zone selections by Sydney and Greater Western Sydney from New South Wales or the ACT
- Zone selections by Brisbane Lions and Gold Coast from Queensland
- Players from other sports, who have not been registered with an Australian rules football club for three years
- Indigenous and multicultural players through their Next Generation Academy zones

In 2026, the AFL introduced an additional Category B rookie spot for all clubs to be able to draft an Indigenous player to their lists for the 2027 season. Previously, clubs could only list up to two Category B rookie players, however they will be able to sign a third player, provided the player is of Indigenous or First Nations background.

== List maintenance ==
Each club is allowed to maintain a list of up to six eligible Category A rookies and three Category B rookies. Up to three rookies can be retained, with the player's permission for a second or third season, with the others having to be either delisted or elevated to the primary list at the time of the National Draft. Only half of the salary paid by a club to players on the rookie list counts towards the league's salary cap.

Generally speaking, a rookie-listed player cannot be selected to play in the senior AFL competition, and must play in state-level affiliated teams, except in two circumstances:

- At the start of a season, a club can nominate up to two veterans from its senior list for salary cap reasons; if a team does not have a full quota of veterans, it can make up the balance by nominating rookies to be eligible for senior selection. These players are known as nominated rookies.
- If a senior-listed player is moved onto the long-term injury list, a rookie-listed player can be temporarily elevated in his place, becoming eligible for senior selection, while the senior player remains injured.

There are usually plenty of opportunities to enact one of these rules, so rookie-listed players who are playing well enough for senior selection are seldom deprived of the opportunity by list management constraints.

== History ==
The rookie list was established in 1997. It was initially aimed at providing recruitment opportunities for young players, in part filling a gap which had been left by the reduction in size of AFL lists from 52 to 42 players in 1994. At that time, rookie players must have been between the ages of 18 and 23 to qualify. In 2006, this was relaxed to allow each club to recruit a rookie older than 23 if he had never previously been on an AFL list. This has since been relaxed further, and now there no upper age or experience restrictions on Category A rookies.

In 2006, "International rookies" were identified for the first time as a separate class of rookie, covering international players from any countries except Ireland, in order to protect the AFL's relationship with the Gaelic Athletic Association. The "International rookie" category has since been expanded to the broader Category B.

The relaxing of eligibility criteria have resulted a notable semantic anomaly with the rookie list: that highly experienced players may serve on a club's rookie list, even though the word "rookie" is widely understood in most sports and professions to refer to a new or inexperienced person. For example, Carlton's Heath Scotland spent his sixteenth and final AFL season on Carlton's rookie list, mostly to free up space on the club's primary list.

Before eligibility criteria were relaxed, special dispensation was granted for Adam Ramanauskas to be played on Essendon's rookie list in 2006. Ramanauskas had played over 100 AFL games for the club, but there was uncertainty over his playing future as he underwent treatment and recovery for cancer.

In 2014, Matthew Priddis was awarded the Brownlow Medal as the AFL's best and fairest player. Polling 26 votes, Priddis became the first player to win the award having begun his career on the rookie list.

== Future ==
The Australian Football League Players' Association (AFLPA) has stated a desire to abolish the rookie list, in favour of an expanded 46 player roster. The AFLPA's main argument is that rookies now have the same workload as senior players – which was not necessarily true in the early days of the rookie list – but that their pay and opportunities are much lower than that of senior players.

== Most successful rookies ==
Some of the most successful players (having played over 100 AFL games and/or kicked over 100 goals in the AFL) originally drafted into the AFL via the rookie system are:

- Tom Atkins
- Liam Baker
- Michael Barlow
- Nathan Bassett
- Jarryd Blair
- Mark Blicavs
- Nathan Bock
- Matthew Boyd
- Luke Breust
- Dean Brogan
- Greg Broughton
- Shannon Byrnes
- Charlie Cameron
- Levi Casboult
- Jason Castagna
- Andrew Carrazzo
- Robert Copeland
- Dean Cox
- Stewart Crameri
- Jack Crisp
- Ed Curnow
- Aaron Davey
- Matt de Boer
- Michael Doughty
- Paul Duffield
- Aaron Edwards
- Michael Firrito
- Chad Fletcher
- Nathan Foley
- Josh Gibson
- Hugh Greenwood
- Antoni Grover
- Heath Grundy
- Jarrod Harbrow
- Pearce Hanley
- Leigh Harding
- Roger Hayden
- Jack Henry
- Kieren Jack
- Sam Jacobs
- Mark Jamar
- Mark Johnson
- Darren Jolly
- Brett Jones
- Tadhg Kennelly
- Jake King
- Brett Kirk
- Rory Laird
- Kane Lambert
- Tarkyn Lockyer
- Nathan Lovett-Murray
- Heritier Lumumba
- Quinten Lynch
- Rowan Marshall
- Martin Mattner
- Nick Maxwell
- Sam Menegola
- James McDonald
- Jeremy McGovern
- Ben McGlynn
- Mal Michael
- Stephen Milne
- Dale Morris
- Shane Mumford
- Robin Nahas
- Mark Nicoski
- Michael Osborne
- Joel Patfull
- Danyle Pearce
- Damien Peverill
- Liam Picken
- James Podsiadly
- Jason Porplyzia
- Matt Priddis
- Dean Rioli
- Russell Robertson
- Max Rooke
- Ben Rutten
- Aaron Sandilands
- Brad Sewell
- Jayden Short
- Jack Sinclair
- Cheynee Stiller
- Bret Thornton
- Greg Tivendale
- Shane Tuck
- Zach Tuohy
- Callum Wilkie
- Clinton Young
