= Alex Forster =

Australian rules footballer (born 1993)

Personal information
- Full name: Alex Forster
- Born: 14 July 1993 (age 33)
- Original team: Norwood (SANFL)
- Draft: #29, 2011 National Draft, Fremantle
- Height: 189 cm (6 ft 2 in)
- Weight: 85 kg (187 lb)
- Position: Defender

Playing career^{1}
Years	Club	Games (Goals)
2012–2013	Fremantle	1 (0)
- ^{1} Playing statistics correct to the end of 2013.

Alex Forster (born 24 July 1993) is an Australian rules footballer who plays for Norwood in the South Australian National Football League (SANFL). He previously played for the Fremantle Football Club in the Australian Football League (AFL).

== Football career ==
Originally from Edenhope, a town in western Victoria, he played for the Norwood Football Club in the South Australian National Football League (SANFL) as well as representing South Australia at the 2011 AFL Under 18 Championships.

He was drafted to Fremantle with their third selection (number 29 overall) in the 2011 AFL draft. Forster's close friend and former teammate from Kybybolite Junior Football Club, Lachie Neale, was also drafted by Fremantle with their next selection in the same draft. They join Melbourne co-captain Jack Trengove as ex-Kybybolite players on AFL lists.

After spending the first half of the 2012 season recovering from a hip spur operation, he played the remainder of the year in Swan Districts reserves side in the West Australian Football League (WAFL). In 2013 he transferred to Peel Thunder and made his WAFL league debut. Forster was one of ten players brought into the Fremantle side in the final round of the 2013 AFL season against St Kilda at Etihad Stadium, when many senior players were rested ahead of the finals matches.

Delisted by Fremantle at the end of the 2013 season, Forster returned to South Australia and rejoined Norwood.
