= Michael Apeness =

Australian rules footballer

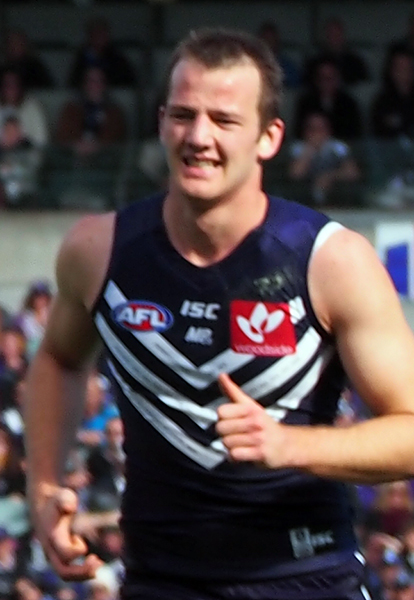
- Apeness playing for Fremantle in August 2016

Personal information
- Born: 28 January 1995 (age 31)
- Original team: Eastern Ranges
- Debut: Round 16, 5 July 2014, Fremantle vs. Melbourne, at TIO Stadium
- Height: 200 cm (6 ft 7 in)
- Weight: 101 kg (223 lb)
- Position: Forward

Club information
- Current club: Fremantle
- Number: 35

Playing career^{1}
Years	Club	Games (Goals)
2014–2018	Fremantle	12 (6)
- ^{1} Playing statistics correct to the end of 2018.

Michael Apeness (born 28 January 1995) is a former Australian rules footballer who played for the Fremantle Football Club in the Australian Football League (AFL). He mainly played as a key position forward or ruckman.

== Early life ==
Apeness was born in Perth, but moved to Melbourne when he was 7 years old. He attended Donvale Christian College all the way until Year 12. He played for the Eastern Ranges in the TAC Cup, but at age 16 decided to play rugby union. He was selected to play in a Melbourne Rebels development squad, but after tearing the anterior cruciate ligament in his knee, and despite the Rebels assisting in his rehabilitation he decided to switch back to play Australian football. He represented Victoria Metro at the 2013 AFL Under 18 Championships and played in a TAC Cup premiership with Eastern Ranges. He was selected with the 17th pick at the 2013 national draft by Fremantle. Apeness started the 2014 season playing for Fremantle's affiliate team, Peel Thunder in the West Australian Football League (WAFL).

== AFL career ==
Apeness made his AFL debut in Round 16, 2014 against Melbourne at TIO Stadium in Darwin, as a late replacement for Matthew Pavlich, who was ill. He played the following week before being dropped back to Peel for the remainder of the season.

In 2015, Apeness started the season playing for Peel, but injured his posterior cruciate ligament (PCL) in his left knee and missed the remainder of the season. He returned from injury with Peel midway through the 2016 season and was recalled to Fremantle's team for the last four matches of the season. He was a member of Peel's inaugural WAFL premiership in 2016.

Another knee injury during the 2017 pre-season prevented Apeness from playing early in the year. During his first game back from injury with the Peel reserves, he injured the PCL in his right knee, causing him to again miss the remainder of the season.

In 2018 Apeness played the opening six matches of the season for Peel, before being recalled to replace an injured Aaron Sandilands in round 11. He played five consecutive games, before being dropped back to Peel. The week after signing a contract extension, he badly injured his hamstring tendon, ruling him out for the remainder of the season for the third time in his career. At the end of the 2018 season, Apeness was delisted, with the commitment by Fremantle to re-draft him in the rookie draft, however Apeness instead announced his retirement from the AFL.
