= Jesse Crichton =

Australian rules footballer

Personal information
- Full name: Jesse Crichton
- Born: 18 June 1991 (age 35)
- Original team: North Launceston (TFL)
- Draft: No. 48, 2009 National draft, Fremantle
- Height: 184 cm (6 ft 0 in)
- Weight: 79 kg (174 lb)

Playing career^{1}
Years	Club	Games (Goals)
2010–2013	Fremantle	18 (3)
- ^{1} Playing statistics correct to the end of 2013.

Jesse Crichton (born 18 June 1991) is an Australian rules footballer who played for the Fremantle Football Club in the Australian Football League (AFL). Jesse now plays for Scottsdale in the NTFA in Northern Tasmania

== AFL career ==
Originally recruited from Branxholm Football Club and North Launceston Football Club in northern Tasmania, he was drafted to Fremantle with selection 48 in the 2009 AFL draft. He represented Tasmania at the 2008 and 2009 AFL Under 18 Championships. Upon moving to Western Australia he was allocated to the Peel Thunder Football Club in the West Australian Football League (WAFL).

He made his AFL debut in Fremantle's loss to the Western Bulldogs in Round 17 of the 2010 AFL season, scoring 1 goal.

At the end of the 2013 AFL Season, he was delisted by the Fremantle Football Club.
