= Peter Faulks =

Australian rules footballer (born 1988)

Personal information
- Full name: Peter Faulks
- Born: 24 April 1988 (age 38)
- Original teams: Calder Cannons (TAC Cup); Williamstown (VFL)
- Draft: No. 65, 2006 National draft, Sydney
- Height: 192 cm (6 ft 4 in)
- Weight: 80 kg (176 lb)
- Position: Defender

Club information
- Current club: Fremantle
- Number: 28

Playing career^{1}
Years	Club	Games (Goals)
2011–2013	Fremantle	3 (0)
- ^{1} Playing statistics correct to the end of 2013.

Peter Faullks (born 24 April 1988) is an Australian rules footballer for the Fremantle Football Club in the Australian Football League (AFL) and the Peel Thunder Football Club in the West Australian Football League (WAFL).

Originally from the Calder Cannons in the TAC Cup, he played for Victoria in the 2006 AFL Under 18 Championships. He was then drafted by Sydney with the 65th selection in the 2006 AFL draft, but was delisted after two years at the club without making his AFL debut.

Faulks then returned to Melbourne and played in the Victorian Football League, firstly for the Casey Scorpions in 2009 before switching to Williamstown in 2010. He performed well for Williamstown and was selected in the Victorian state team in 2010.

Prior to the 2010 AFL draft, Fremantle arranged a deal with the new Gold Coast club to obtain Faulks in return for trading selection 55 for selection 61. As part of the player drafting concessions provided to Gold Coast, they had the right to draft or trade any player who had previously been drafted and delisted by an AFL team.

Faulks had to wait until round 21 of the 2011 AFL season to make his AFL debut, against Carlton at Patersons Stadium. In his second AFL game, against Collingwood at Patersons Stadium, he was stretchered from the ground after fracturing his cheekbone in a collision with Cameron Wood.

Peter was delisted by Fremantle at the conclusion of the 2013 AFL season, having played just the one game (round 23). He returned to Williamstown and played up until the end of 2018. Faulks played a total of 96 games with the VFL Seagulls, kicking 7 goals, including the 2015 premiership victory over Box Hill at Docklands Stadium. He finished in equal third place in the 2010 Club best and fairest award and was selected in the VFL Team-of-the-Year in 2010 and 2015 and was a VFL representative player in 2010 and 2016. Faulks transferred to Echuca in 2019.
