= Jacob Ballard =

Australian rules footballer

Personal information
- Full name: Jacob Ballard
- Born: 26 February 1994 (age 32)
- Original team: Northern Blues (VFL)
- Draft: No. 47, 2014 Rookie draft, Fremantle
- Height: 188 cm (6 ft 2 in)
- Weight: 89 kg (196 lb)
- Position: Midfielder

Playing career^{1}
Years	Club	Games (Goals)
2014–2015	Fremantle	1 (0)
- ^{1} Playing statistics correct to the end of 2015.

Career highlights
- VFL: VFL premiership player: 2019

Jacob Ballard (born 26 February 1994) is a current Coburg Football Club player and a former professional Australian rules footballer who played for the Fremantle Football Club in the Australian Football League (AFL).

Drafted with the 47th selection in the 2014 Rookie Draft from Northern Blues in the Victorian Football League (VFL), he played for Peel Thunder in the West Australian Football League (WAFL), Fremantle's reserve team during the 2014 and 2015 seasons.

Ballard made his AFL debut for Fremantle in the final round of the 2015 AFL season, when Fremantle sent a weakened team to play Port Adelaide at Adelaide Oval. Twelve changes were made to the team, and Ballard was one of four players to make their AFL debuts. He was delisted at the conclusion of the 2015 season. One day after being delisted by Fremantle, Ballard was awarded the Tuckey Medal as the best and fairest player for Peel Thunder in 2015.

== VFL career ==
Ballard was named on the interchange of the VFL's Team of the Year while playing for Richmond in 2017. In 2019 he won a VFL premiership with Richmond. In November 2019, Ballard agreed to a 1-year agreement with the Coburg Football Club.
