= Hayden Crozier =

Australian rules footballer (born 1993)

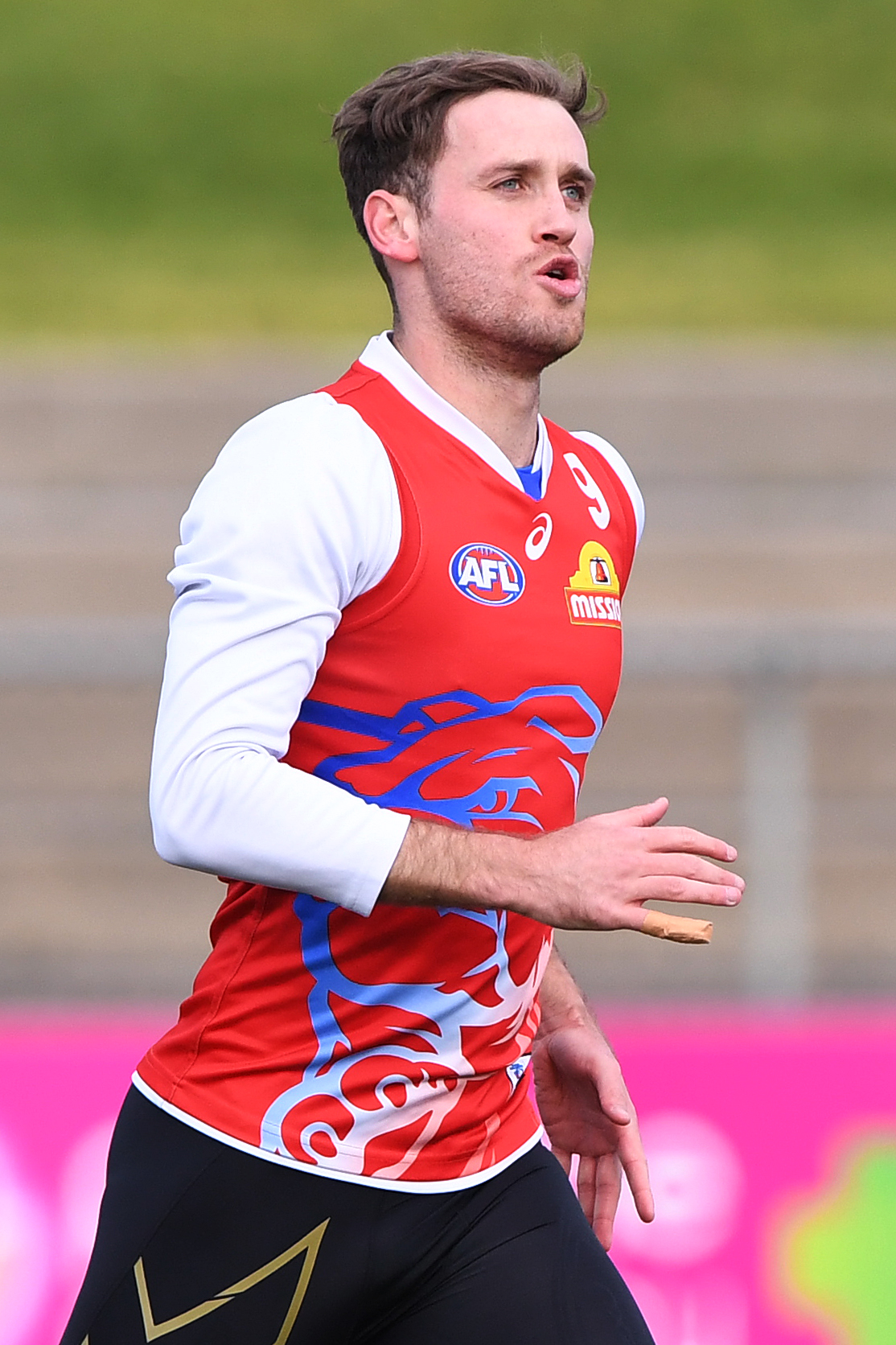
- Crozier in August 2018

Personal information
- Full name: Hayden Crozier
- Born: 24 December 1993 (age 32)
- Original team: Rowville Football Club Eastern Ranges (TAC Cup)
- Draft: No. 20, 2011 national draft
- Height: 187 cm (6 ft 2 in)
- Weight: 83 kg (183 lb)
- Position: Defender

Playing career
Years	Club	Games (Goals)
2012–2017	Fremantle	69 (44)
2018–2023	Western Bulldogs	73 (4)
Total		142 (48)

Hayden Crozier (born 24 December 1993) is a former professional Australian rules footballer who played in the Australian Football League (AFL). He played for the Fremantle Football Club from 2012 to 2017 and the Western Bulldogs from 2017 to 2023.

== Career ==
Originally from Rowville, Crozier played junior football for the Eastern Ranges in the TAC Cup. He performed well at the AFL Draft Combine, recording the second highest running leap and elite-level sprinting and endurance results. He represented Victoria Metro at the 2011 AFL Under 18 Championships where he took a spectacular high mark against Western Australia.

He was drafted by Fremantle with their second selection, 20th overall, in the 2011 AFL draft.

A high leaping left-footed forward, Crozier was selected to play his first games for Fremantle in round 10 of the 2012 AFL season against the Adelaide Football Club after performing well in the West Australian Football League (WAFL) for East Perth.

At the conclusion of the 2017 AFL season, Crozier was traded to the Western Bulldogs.

His father is Sri Lankan.

== Statistics ==
Statistics are correct to the end of the 2020 season

Legend
G	Goals	K	Kicks	D	Disposals	T	Tackles
B	Behinds	H	Handballs	M	Marks

Season	Team	No.	Games	Totals							Averages (per game)						
Season	Team	No.	Games	G	B	K	H	D	M	T	G	B	K	H	D	M	T
2012	Fremantle	17	3	0	0	13	17	30	5	3	0.0	0.0	4.3	5.7	10.0	1.7	1.0
2013	Fremantle	17	9	10	4	75	25	100	33	21	1.1	0.4	8.3	2.8	11.1	3.7	2.3
2014	Fremantle	17	11	8	6	77	44	121	33	36	0.7	0.6	7.0	4.0	11.0	3.0	3.3
2015	Fremantle	17	11	7	3	58	34	92	23	31	0.6	0.3	5.3	3.1	8.4	2.1	2.8
2016	Fremantle	17	16	6	6	187	78	265	87	48	0.4	0.4	11.7	4.9	16.6	5.4	3.0
2017	Fremantle	17	19	13	17	148	92	240	86	74	0.7	0.9	7.8	4.8	12.6	4.5	3.9
2018	Western Bulldogs	9	17	1	1	210	104	314	83	47	0.1	0.1	12.4	6.1	18.5	4.9	2.8
2019	Western Bulldogs	9	22	0	0	257	108	365	136	44	0.0	0.0	11.7	4.9	16.6	6.2	2.0
2020 (Note: The 2020 season was played with 17 home-and-away matches per team (down from 22) and 16-minute quarters with time on (down from 20-minute quarters with time on) due to the impact of the COVID-19 pandemic.)	Western Bulldogs	9	15	2	2	154	55	209	59	40	0.1	0.1	10.3	3.7	13.9	3.9	2.7
Career			123	47	39	1179	557	1736	545	344	0.4	0.3	9.6	4.5	14.1	4.4	2.8
