= Michael Walters =

Australian rules footballer (born 1991)

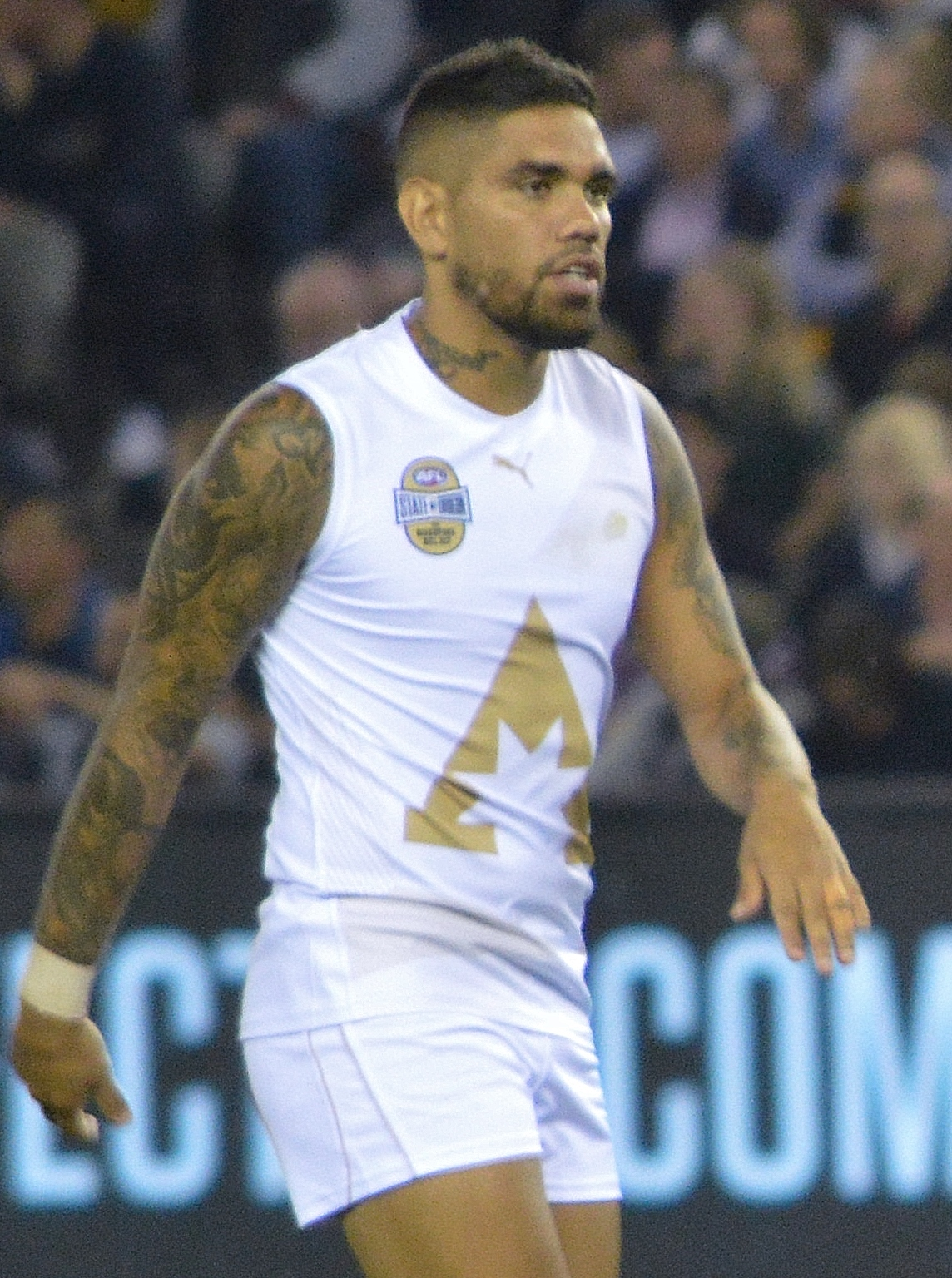
- Walters playing for the All-Stars in 2020

Personal information
- Full name: Michael Walters
- Nickname: Sonny Walters
- Born: 7 January 1991 (age 35); Woodvale, Western Australia, Australia
- Original team: Swan Districts (WAFL)
- Draft: No. 53, 2008 national draft
- Height: 176 cm (5 ft 9 in)
- Weight: 79 kg (174 lb)
- Position: Forward / midfielder

Playing career
Years	Club	Games (Goals)
2009–2025	Fremantle	239 (365)

Representative team honours
Years	Team	Games (Goals)
2020	All Stars	1 (1)
2025	Indigenous All-Stars	1 (1)

Career highlights
- 5× Fremantle leading goalkicker: 2013, 2015, 2016, 2018, 2019; All-Australian team: 2019; Indigenous All-Stars captain: 2025; 22under22 team: 2013; Fremantle 25 since ‘95 Team; Fremantle Life Member: 2019; WAFL Premiership Player: (2010)

Michael Walters (born 7 January 1991) is a former Australian rules footballer who played for the Fremantle Football Club in the Australian Football League (AFL). Having spent most of his career playing as a small forward, Walters was a five-time Fremantle leading goalkicker. In 2019, he was rewarded with his debut selection in the All-Australian team.

== Junior career ==
A highly skilled player who mainly played as a midfielder or forward, Walters was selected by Fremantle with the 53rd pick in the 2008 AFL draft. He had made his senior debut for Swan Districts in the West Australian Football League in 2008, playing 2 matches. Nicknamed Son-Son, he lived on the same street in Midvale as his former Swan Districts teammates and fellow 2008 AFL draftees Nic Naitanui and Chris Yarran. Walters' father Mike played for Central District in the South Australian National Football League.

In 2007 he represented Western Australia at the Under 16 Championships and won the Kevin Sheehan Medal (shared with Tom Scully) as the best player in the championships, after kicking 10 goals in his three games. He was a member of the 2007-08 AIS/AFL Academy squad and in 2008 represented Western Australia at the 2008 AFL Under 18 Championships and was named in the All-Australian Team.

== AFL career ==
Walters made his AFL debut for Fremantle in Round 11 of the 2009 AFL season at Football Park against Port Adelaide, after Hayden Ballantyne was a late withdrawal due to injury. He kicked a goal in his debut match, minutes before fellow debutant and Swan Districts teammate Clancee Pearce also kicked a goal.

Prior to the start of the 2012 AFL season, Walters was suspended from training with Fremantle and sent back to train and play for Swan Districts due to a poor fitness level and being overweight. He improved his fitness and performed well for Swans, and was accepted back at Fremantle in April. Walters returned to the AFL in July, in round 16 against Melbourne. He played in every game after returning, kicking 22 goals from 10 games. In late September 2012 Walters was re-signed for a further two years, until the end of the 2014 season.

In 2013 Walters had his best season to date, kicking 46 goals from 21 games, was named in the initial All Australian 40-man squad and won his first Fremantle leading goal-kicker award.

In 2015, he had another consistent goal-kicking season, which saw him kick 44 goals across 22 games, winning his second Fremantle leading goal-kicker award.

In the 2017 season, his standout performance came in Round 15, at Subiaco Oval against St Kilda, where he collected a team-high 32 disposals and kicked 6 goals. He was ruled out for the remainder of the season after injuring his Posterior Cruciate Ligament in his left knee, in Fremantle's loss to Hawthorn in Round 18. Despite being moved into the midfield towards the middle of the season, he finished the season with 22 goals from 17 games. He became a member of Fremantle's leadership group in 2017.

In 2018, Walters averaged a career-high 19.8 disposals per game and won Fremantle's leading goal-kicker award with 22 goals from 18 games. He was a finalist for Mark of the Year, where he was nominated for his high-flying mark on Jeremy McGovern, against the West Coast Eagles in Round 20.

Walters started 2019 in blazing fashion, averaging career-high figures. In Round 10, he kicked a behind after the siren to give the Dockers a 1-point win over the Brisbane Lions at Perth Stadium. The following week in the Round 11 clash with Collingwood at the MCG, Walters kicked a goal with 30 seconds remaining to give the Dockers a 4-point lead which ultimately won them the game. Arguably, his best performance came in Round 13 when Fremantle played Port Adelaide at Perth Stadium. He kicked 6.1 and picked up 25 disposals in the 21-point victory, and was awarded the maximum 10 in the AFLCA votes for his performance. Walters received his first All-Australian selection named in the 2019 All-Australian team as a half forward.

The 2022 AFL season saw Walters make his return as a forward after spending time in the midfield in recent seasons. Walters played his 200th game during Fremantle's round 23 clash against GWS, he played a pivotal role kicking three goals in Fremantle's 20 point win. Walters played a crucial role in Fremantle's elimination final victory over the Western Bulldogs at Perth Stadium kicking three goals.

Walters missed Fremantle's first game of the 2023 AFL season against St Kilda due to an Achilles tendon injury. Walters was named as the emergency substitute in Fremantle's round 2 clash against North Melbourne. He entered the game in the third quarter kicking two goals. The Round 3 Western Derby saw Walters kick four goals during Fremantle's 41 point win over West Coast. Walters kicked four goals in round 5 during Fremantle's 10 point win over Gold Coast, which was played at Norwood Oval in Adelaide, due to the AFL's inaugural Gather Round.

In April 2023 Walters was subjected to racial and homophobic abuse on social media, along with teammate Nathan Wilson, which was investigated by AFL's integrity unit.

In June 2023, it was announced that Walters had signed on for two more years at the Dockers, alongside fellow Fremantle veteran Nat Fyfe.

Walters kicked his 350th goal in round two of the 2024 AFL season against North Melbourne at Marvel Stadium. He was one of Fremantle's best players the next week against the Adelaide Crows at Perth Stadium, collecting 21 disposals and kicking two goals during the match. Walters suffered a hamstring injury during the round 14 loss to the Bulldogs, and as a result he only managed four more games for the year, playing as the substitute on three of those occasions. He was originally named as the substitute for Fremantle's annual Starlight Purple Haze fundraiser match against the Melbourne Demons in round nineteen, but the late withdrawal of Matthew Johnson due to injury meant he was elevated into the final 22. He finished the game having played perhaps his best match of the year, kicking a season-high four goals, and collecting 16 disposals during the 50 point win.

Prior to the 2025 AFL season, Walters was one of the first players announced for the return of the Indigenous All-Stars, set to face Walters' Dockers in February 2025. Later, Walters was announced to be the captain of the squad. He pulled up sore after the match with a knee injury.

On 3 July 2025, with no matches played in 2025, Walters announced his retirement from the AFL after 239 games and 365 goals over 16 seasons for the Dockers. The following week to celebrate his retirement, he was given a lap of honour during the half-time break of Fremantle's Round 18 home game against Hawthorn at Optus Stadium.

== Personal life ==
Walters has three daughters.

In October 2023, Walters became the number one ticket holder at the Perth Lynx for the 2023–24 WNBL season. In March 2024, he became the number one ticket holder at the Cockburn Cougars for the 2024 NBL1 West season.

== Statistics ==
Legend
G	Goals	K	Kicks	D	Disposals	T	Tackles
B	Behinds	H	Handballs	M	Marks

Season	Team	No.	Games	Totals							Averages (per game)							Votes
Season	Team	No.	Games	G	B	K	H	D	M	T	G	B	K	H	D	M	T	Votes
2009	Fremantle	38	3	2	1	21	11	32	14	5	0.7	0.3	7.0	3.7	10.7	4.7	1.7	0
2010	Fremantle	38	5	8	1	52	17	69	15	12	1.6	0.2	10.4	3.4	13.8	3.0	2.4	0
2011	Fremantle	38	3	4	3	19	5	24	3	8	1.3	1.0	6.3	1.7	8.0	1.0	2.7	0
2012	Fremantle	38	10	22	11	83	36	119	40	29	2.2	1.1	8.3	3.6	11.9	4.0	2.9	0
2013	Fremantle	10	21	46	23	231	93	324	108	52	2.2	1.1	11.0	4.4	15.4	5.1	2.5	6
2014	Fremantle	10	8	15	13	79	28	107	29	20	1.9	1.6	9.9	3.5	13.4	3.6	2.5	0
2015	Fremantle	10	22	44	19	225	107	332	77	54	2.0	0.9	10.2	4.9	15.1	3.5	2.5	3
2016	Fremantle	10	22	36	21	244	157	401	91	66	1.6	1.0	11.1	7.1	18.2	4.1	3.0	3
2017	Fremantle	10	17	22	14	197	131	328	74	45	1.3	0.8	11.6	7.7	19.3	4.4	2.6	10
2018	Fremantle	10	18	22	14	206	150	356	65	59	1.2	0.8	11.4	8.3	19.8	3.6	3.3	8
2019	Fremantle	10	22	40	17	303	176	479	83	78	1.8	0.8	13.8	8.0	21.8	3.8	3.5	11
2020 (Note: The 2020 season was played with 17 home-and-away matches per team (down from 22) and 16-minute quarters with time on (down from 20-minute quarters with time on) due to the impact of the COVID-19 pandemic.)	Fremantle	10	14	15	7	145	102	247	44	40	1.1	0.5	10.4	7.3	17.6	3.1	2.9	8
2021	Fremantle	10	16	14	11	147	76	223	63	33	0.9	0.7	9.2	4.8	13.9	3.9	2.1	0
2022	Fremantle	10	21	25	15	172	124	296	82	57	1.2	0.7	8.2	5.9	14.1	3.9	2.7	0
2023	Fremantle	10	20	33	13	127	72	199	56	33	1.7	0.7	6.4	3.6	10.0	2.8	1.7	0
2024	Fremantle	10	17	17	13	90	59	149	43	31	1.0	0.8	5.3	3.5	8.8	2.5	1.8	0
2025	Fremantle	10	0	—	—	—	—	—	—	—	—	—	—	—	—	—	—	0
Career			239	365	196	2341	1344	3685	887	622	1.5	0.8	9.8	5.6	15.4	3.7	2.6	49

== Honours and achievements ==
Team

- McClelland Trophy (Fremantle) 2015
- WAFL Premiership Player (Swan Districts) 2010

Individual

- 5× Fremantle leading goalkicker: 2013, 2015, 2016, 2018, 2019
- All-Australian team: 2019
- 22under22 team: 2013
- Fremantle 25 since ‘95 Team
- Fremantle Life Member: 2019
