= Tanner Smith (footballer) =

Australian rules footballer

Personal information
- Full name: Tanner James Smith
- Born: 8 March 1994 (age 32)
- Original team: North Ballarat Rebels
- Debut: Round 4, 2013, Fremantle vs. Hawthorn, at Aurora Stadium
- Height: 196 cm (6 ft 5 in)
- Weight: 95 kg (209 lb)
- Position: Defender/Forward

Playing career^{1}
Years	Club	Games (Goals)
2013–2016	Fremantle	4 (2)
- ^{1} Playing statistics correct to the end of 2016.

Career highlights
- SANFL Premiership Player (2018)

Tanner James Smith (born 8 March 1994) is a former professional Australian rules footballer who played for the Fremantle Football Club in the Australian Football League (AFL). He mainly played as a key position defender.

== Early life ==
Originally from Kalkee, Smith attended St Patrick's College in Ballarat and played for the North Ballarat Rebels in the TAC Cup. He represented Victorian Country at the 2012 AFL Under 18 Championships. Nominated as the 36th selection at the 2012 national draft as a key position defender, Smith started the 2013 season at Peel Thunder in the West Australian Football League (WAFL).

== AFL career ==
Smith made his AFL debut in round 4, 2013 against Hawthorn at Aurora Stadium in Tasmania, as a late replacement for Luke McPharlin, who failed the concussion test.

Smith was delisted at the conclusion of the 2016 season.

Smith joined North Adelaide Football Club in the SANFL at the start of the 2017 football season. Initially recruited as a forward he soon became an integral part of the teams backline, and was Centre Half Back in the teams drought breaking 2018 Premiership team.

== Statistics ==
Legend
G	Goals	K	Kicks	D	Disposals	T	Tackles
B	Behinds	H	Handballs	M	Marks

Season	Team	No.	Games	Totals							Averages (per game)						
Season	Team	No.	Games	G	B	K	H	D	M	T	G	B	K	H	D	M	T
2013	Fremantle	22	1	0	0	4	4	8	4	2	0.0	0.0	4.0	4.0	8.0	4.0	2.0
2015	Fremantle	22	1	0	0	11	6	17	8	2	0.0	0.0	11.0	6.0	17.0	8.0	2.0
2016	Fremantle	22	2	2	0	9	9	18	4	5	1.0	0.0	4.5	4.5	9.0	2.0	2.5
Career			4	2	0	24	19	43	16	9	0.5	0.0	6.0	4.8	10.8	4.0	2.2
