= Jack Hannath =

Australian rules footballer

Personal information
- Born: 9 July 1991 (age 35)
- Original teams: Central District, SANFL
- Debut: Round 5, 2013, Fremantle vs. Richmond, at Patersons Stadium
- Height: 200 cm (6 ft 7 in)
- Weight: 101 kg (223 lb)
- Position: Ruckman

Playing career^{1}
Years	Club	Games (Goals)
2011–2012, 2017-2018	Central District	62 (18)
2013–2016	Fremantle	20 (8)
2020–2022	Glenelg	43 (7)
- ^{1} Playing statistics correct to the end of 2016.

Jack Hannath (born 9 July 1991) is a former professional Australian rules footballer who played for the Fremantle Football Club in the Australian Football League (AFL). He mainly played as a ruckman, and is currently playing in the SANFL.

== Early life ==
Originally from Nuriootpa, South Australia he played for Angaston Football Club in the Barossa Light & Gawler Football Association before being signed by Central District in the South Australian National Football League (SANFL). He was predicted to be drafted in the 2009 AFL draft, but was not selected. He continued to play for Centrals and was doing pre-season training with the Melbourne Football Club in Darwin when he was drafted by Fremantle with the 8th selection at the 2012 Pre-season Draft. Hannath started the 2013 season playing for Peel Thunder in the West Australian Football League (WAFL).

== AFL career ==
Hannath made his AFL debut in Round 5, 2013 against Richmond at Patersons Stadium. In a one-point victory, Hannath took a strong mark in the final minute to repel a Richmond attack. He was delisted at the conclusion of the 2016 season.

== Statistics ==
Legend
G	Goals	K	Kicks	D	Disposals	T	Tackles
B	Behinds	H	Handballs	M	Marks	H/O	Hit-outs

Season	Team	No.	Games	Totals								Averages (per game)							
Season	Team	No.	Games	G	B	K	H	D	M	T	H/O	G	B	K	H	D	M	T	H/O
2013	Fremantle	38	12	7	1	49	37	86	31	19	70	0.6	0.1	4.1	3.1	7.2	2.6	1.6	5.8
2014	Fremantle	38	3	0	1	15	3	18	7	6	26	0.0	0.3	5.0	1.0	6.0	2.3	2.0	8.7
2015	Fremantle	38	3	1	1	16	13	29	6	5	30	0.3	0.3	5.3	4.3	9.7	2.0	1.7	10.0
2016	Fremantle	38	2	0	1	9	6	15	2	7	22	0.0	0.5	4.5	3.0	7.5	1.0	3.5	11.0
Career			20	8	4	89	59	148	46	37	148	0.4	0.2	4.4	3.0	7.4	2.3	1.8	7.4
