= Cam Sutcliffe =

Australian rules footballer (born 1992)

Personal information
- Full name: Cameron Sutcliffe
- Born: 23 May 1992 (age 34); Naracoorte, South Australia
- Original team: Woodville-West Torrens (SANFL)
- Draft: No. 71, 2011 national draft No. 9, 2019 mid-season rookie draft
- Debut: Round 15, 2012, Fremantle vs. Western Bulldogs, at Patersons Stadium
- Height: 187 cm (6 ft 2 in)
- Weight: 88 kg (194 lb)
- Position: Defender / midfielder

Playing career^{1}
Years	Club	Games (Goals)
2012–2018	Fremantle	104 (18)
2019–2020	Port Adelaide	9 (5)
Total		113 (23)
- ^{1} Playing statistics correct to the end of round 16, 2020.

Cameron Sutcliffe (born 23 May 1992) is a retired professional Australian rules footballer who played 113 games for the Fremantle and Port Adelaide football clubs in the Australian Football League (AFL). He also played for and was captain of Port Adelaide's reserves team in the South Australian National Football League (SANFL).

== Football career ==
=== Fremantle ===
He was recruited by Fremantle Football Club in the 2011 National Draft, with pick #71 from Woodville-West Torrens in the South Australian National Football League (SANFL). He was the third last player chosen in the draft and the last teenager selected.

Sutcliffe made his AFL debut in Round 15, 2012, against Western Bulldogs at Subiaco Oval. The previous week he had performed very well for East Fremantle in the West Australian Football League (WAFL), gathering 34 possessions and kicking two goals.

He played in Fremantle's first Grand Final in 2013, which saw them go down to Hawthorn by 15 points.

Sutcliffe was delisted by Fremantle following the 2018 season

=== Port Adelaide ===
After being delisted by Fremantle, Sutcliffe joined Port Adelaide's reserves team (nicknamed the Magpies) in the SANFL as their captain for the 2019 season. He was elevated onto Port Adelaide's senior AFL list in the 2019 AFL Mid-season rookie draft, taken at pick #9. He made his AFL debut for the club in Round 17 of the 2019 season against the Brisbane Lions at Adelaide Oval, tasked with the job of tagging his former Fremantle teammate and good friend Lachie Neale in Port's 48 point loss. Sutcliffe was delisted from the senior list at the conclusion of the 2020 AFL season after playing nine AFL games. He was returned to the captaincy of the Port Adelaide Magpies in 2021, as the club rejoined the competition following a COVID-19 imposed suspension in 2020, and remained in the position until the end of the 2023 season, whereupon he was replaced by Nick Moore. Sutcliffe announced his retirement from state league football at the end of the season and transitioned into development coaching at Port Adelaide in 2024.

Sutcliffe has represented South Australia against Western Australia in the annual state league interstate match in 2021.
