= Josh Simpson (Australian footballer) =

Australian rules footballer (born 1994)

Personal information
- Full name: Josh Simpson
- Born: 9 February 1994 (age 32)
- Original team: East Fremantle (WAFL)
- Draft: 1. 17, 2012 National draft, Fremantle
- Height: 184 cm (6 ft 0 in)
- Weight: 73 kg (161 lb)

Playing career^{1}
Years	Club	Games (Goals)
2013–2014	Fremantle	2 (1)
- ^{1} Playing statistics correct to the end of 2014.

Josh Simpson (born 9 February 1994) is an Australian rules footballer who played for the Fremantle Football Club in the Australian Football League (AFL).

== Football career ==
Originally from the small town of Yalgoo in the Murchison region of Western Australia, he represented West Australia at the 2012 AFL Under 18 Championships.

He was drafted to Fremantle with their first selection (number 17 overall) in the 2012 AFL draft.

After spending most of the 2013 season playing for East Fremantle in the West Australian Football League (WAFL), Simpson was one of ten players brought into the Fremantle side in the final round of the 2013 AFL season against St Kilda at Etihad Stadium, when many senior players were rested ahead of the finals matches.

Simpson was delisted at the conclusion of the 2014 AFL season after only playing one AFL game for the year. He was twice fined by the club during the season and sent to complete a personal development program after failed to board a flight to Sydney with the team in April.
