= Alex Silvagni =

Australian rules footballer (born 1987)

Personal information
- Full name: Alex Silvagni
- Born: 29 September 1987 (age 39)
- Original team: Casey Scorpions (VFL)
- Draft: No. 24, 2010 rookie draft
- Height: 192 cm (76 in)
- Weight: 92 kg (203 lb)
- Position: Defender

Playing career^{1}
Years	Club	Games (Goals)
2010–2016	Fremantle	53 (10)
2017–2018	Carlton	7 (0)
Total		60 (10)
- ^{1} Playing statistics correct to the end of 2018.

Alex Silvagni (born 29 September 1987) is a former professional Australian rules footballer who played for the Fremantle Football Club and the Carlton Football Club in the Australian Football League (AFL).

== Early career ==
Silvagni did not play in the TAC Cup as a junior, but instead played for his school, Haileybury College, winning a premiership in his final year in 2005. He joined the Casey Scorpions in the Victorian Football League in 2006, winning selection in the VFL's under-23 team. He had two successful seasons in 2008 and 2009, playing mainly at full back, but also pinch-hitting in the ruck or forwardline, finishing 5th in 2008 (2nd best non-AFL aligned player) and then third in 2009 in Casey's best and fairest award, being awarded the most consistent award in 2008 and winning selection in the 2009 VFL Team of the year.

== AFL career ==
Silvagni attended the Victorian state screening session prior to the 2006 AFL draft, but was not selected by any teams. In 2009, Silvagni moved to Western Australia to train with the Fremantle Football Club, who selected him with their second selection in the 2010 Rookie Draft, the 24th overall. He was one of eight players from the VFL selected in the rookie draft, including Michael Barlow, who was also drafted to Fremantle from the Werribee Football Club.

After playing well in Fremantle's three NAB Cup pre-season games, Silvagni was promoted to Fremantle's senior list and was selected to make his AFL debut in the opening round of the 2010 AFL season.

Silvagni made his debut for Fremantle in the round one of the 2010 AFL season and performed well, taking 7 marks and gathering 14 possessions, including an impressive 55-metre goal as Fremantle recorded a 56-point victory over the Adelaide Football Club. The celebrations, however, were tempered when Silvagni's former captain at the Casey Scorpions, Kyle Matthews, was knocked unconscious when he was involved in a fight after watching the game at a hotel in Hawthorn.

His drafting as a "mature-aged rookie" and subsequent composed performances in his first few games are seen as an indication of a change to the recruiting philosophy to not only draft the best 18-year-old players, but also to consider older players.

At the conclusion of the 2016 season, Silvagni was delisted by Fremantle.

Silvagni was then drafted by Carlton in the 2017 rookie draft. He had a widely remembered best on ground performance on his Carlton debut in Round 6, 2017 against the Sydney Swans, where he lined up as the direct opponent to eventual Coleman medallist Lance Franklin, and kept him to one goal, and bested Franklin one-on-one in several spectacular open-field chases and contests. He played a string of six games, before injury forced him out for the rest of the 2017 season. Despite having played only seven games for the club and still being on the rookie list, Silvagni was elevated to the club's leadership group in 2018; but persistent injuries prevented him from playing at all during the season. He retired at the end of the season, ending his brief but eventful career with the Blues.

== Post-AFL career ==
In 2023, Silvagni was a contestant on the Australian reality television series The Summit.

== Personal life ==
Silvagni is the second cousin of Carlton legend and AFL full-back of the century, Stephen Silvagni. Alex's father Eric and Stephen's father Sergio are first cousins. His mother is Anglo-Indian.

== Statistics ==
Statistics are correct to the end of the 2016 season

Legend
G	Goals	K	Kicks	D	Disposals	T	Tackles
B	Behinds	H	Handballs	M	Marks

Season	Team	No.	Games	Totals							Averages (per game)						
Season	Team	No.	Games	G	B	K	H	D	M	T	G	B	K	H	D	M	T
2010	Fremantle	36	15	4	0	120	46	166	66	52	0.3	0.0	8.0	3.1	11.1	4.4	3.5
2011	Fremantle	36	9	1	0	74	45	119	46	26	0.1	0.0	8.2	5.0	13.2	5.1	2.9
2012	Fremantle	36	5	0	0	37	16	53	24	15	0.0	0.0	7.4	3.2	10.6	4.8	3.0
2013	Fremantle	36	10	5	3	56	32	88	43	26	0.5	0.3	5.6	3.2	8.8	4.3	2.6
2014	Fremantle	36	7	0	0	51	19	70	29	19	0.0	0.0	7.3	2.7	10.0	4.1	2.7
2015	Fremantle	36	2	0	0	14	8	22	11	3	0.0	0.0	7.0	4.0	11.0	5.5	1.5
2016	Fremantle	36	5	0	0	44	27	71	29	6	0.0	0.0	8.8	5.4	14.2	5.8	1.2
Career			53	10	3	396	193	589	248	147	0.2	0.1	7.5	3.6	11.1	4.7	2.8
