= David Mundy =

Australian rules footballer, born 1985

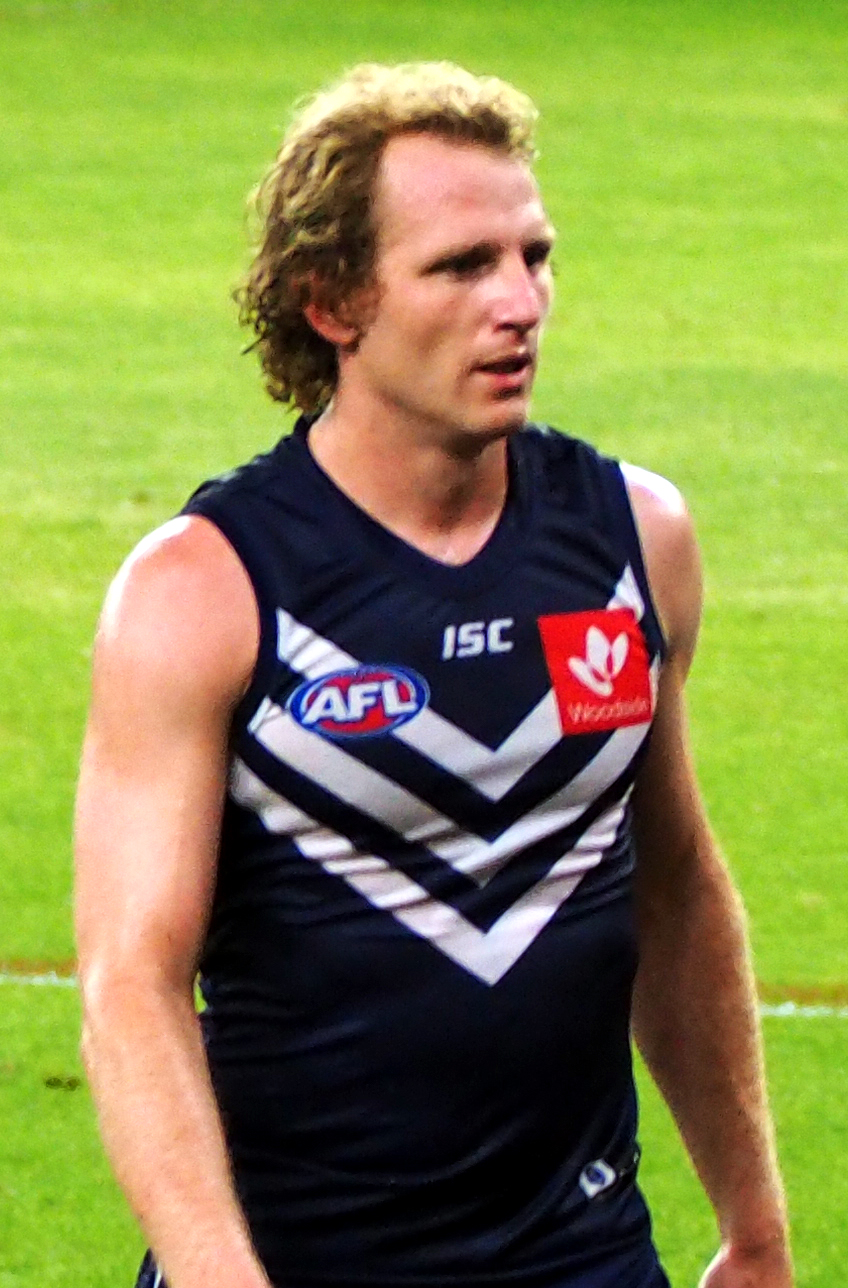
- Mundy playing his 300th game in April 2019

Personal information
- Full name: David Mundy
- Nickname: Barra
- Born: 20 July 1985 (age 41); Seymour, Victoria
- Original team: Murray Bushrangers (TAC Cup)
- Draft: No. 19, 2003 national draft
- Debut: 30 April 2005, Fremantle vs. Melbourne, at MCG
- Height: 193 cm (6 ft 4 in)
- Weight: 94 kg (207 lb)
- Position: Midfielder

Club information
- Current club: Fremantle
- Number: 16

Playing career^{1}
Years	Club	Games (Goals)
2004–2022	Fremantle	376 (161)

International team honours^{2}
Years	Team	Games (Goals)
2006–2015	Australia	2 (0)
- ^{1} Playing statistics correct to the end of 2022.^{2} Representative statistics correct as of 2006.

Career highlights
- Fremantle games record holder; All-Australian team: 2015; Doig Medal: 2010; Fremantle captain: 2016; Ross Glendinning Medal 2013; AFL Rising Star nominee: 2005; Beacon Award: 2005; Best Clubman: 2021; Fremantle Life Member: 2012; Fremantle 25 since ‘95 Team; West Australian Football Hall of Fame: 2026

David Mundy (born 20 July 1985) is a former Australian rules footballer who played for the Fremantle Football Club in the Australian Football League (AFL). He played as a half back flanker or midfielder and was the captain of Fremantle during the 2016 AFL season. Mundy sits tenth in the VFL/AFL games records for most games played.

== Early career ==
Mundy began his football career at the Murray Bushrangers in the TAC Cup. He was drafted by Fremantle at selection 19 in the 2003 AFL draft. This selection was traded to Fremantle by the Western Bulldogs in return for Steven Koops. Upon moving to Western Australia in 2004 he was allocated to the Subiaco Football Club in the West Australian Football League (WAFL). He spent the entire 2004 season playing with Subiaco and was a part of their premiership team.

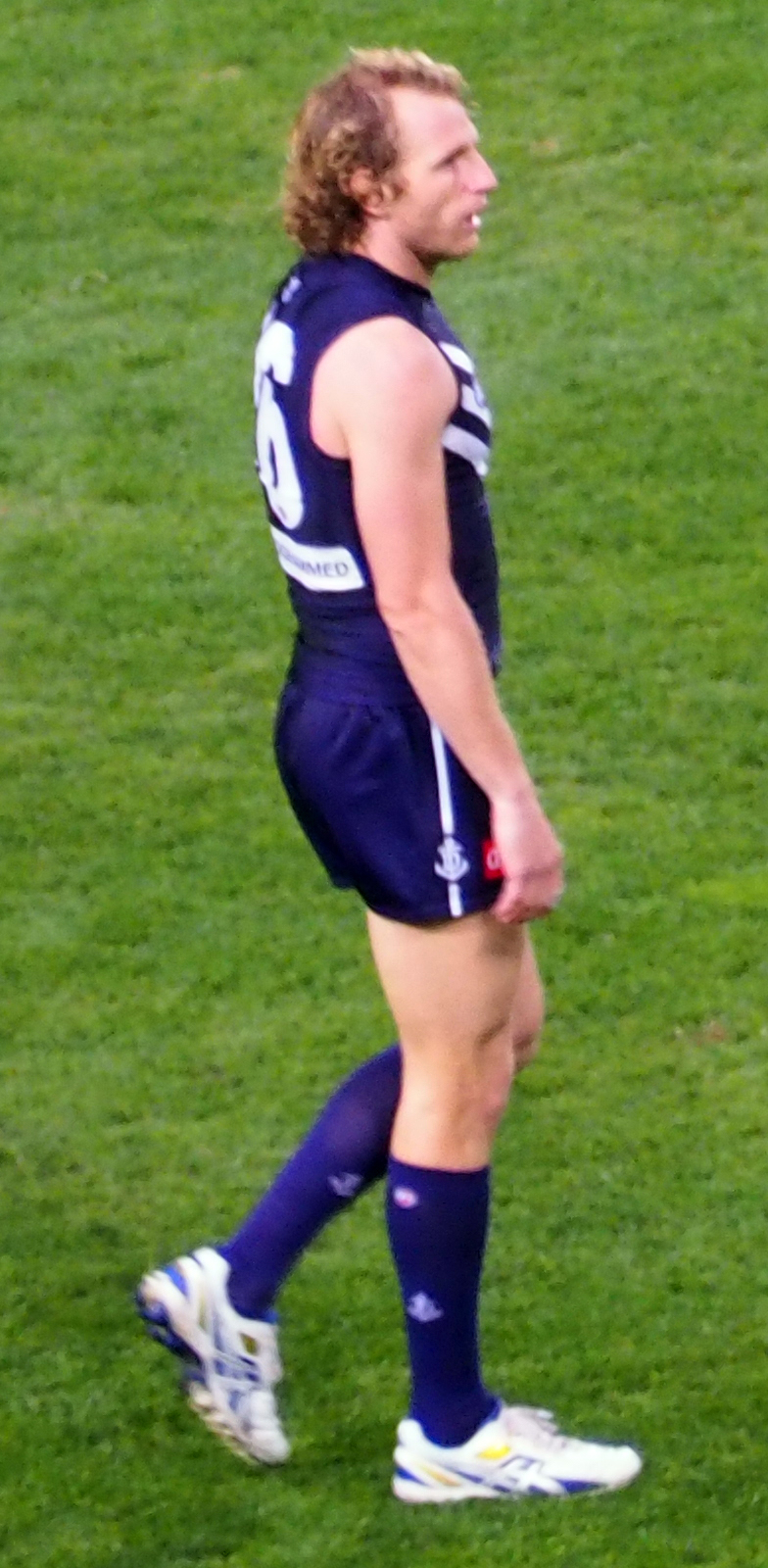
Mundy playing for Fremantle in May 2014

== AFL career ==
Impressive WAFL form continued into 2005 and he was selected by Fremantle to make his AFL debut at the MCG against Melbourne in Round 6. His poise and composure in defence saw Mundy maintain his position in the side for all 17 remaining games for the season. In round 14 he was recognised by the AFL by being nominated for the AFL Rising Star award. In the final voting, he came 3rd behind Brett Deledio and Ryan Griffen with 15 votes. He also was awarded the 2005 Beacon Award as the best young talent on the Fremantle list.

Mundy started the 2008 season in good form, and was shifted to a midfield role late in the season in order to use his kicking ability. In 2009, he played his 100th game and was only the eighth player in league history to play them consecutively from debut. He played 124 consecutive games from his debut until he was a late withdrawal due to stomach cramps before the Round 17, 2010 match against the Western Bulldogs.

2010 was his best season to date, and he was recognised by being named in the 40-man squad for the 2010 All-Australian team and also won the Doig Medal as Fremantle's best player for the year. At the end of the 2010 season, there was much speculation that Mundy would not renew his contract with Fremantle and would instead either return to play in Melbourne, or be recruited by the new Gold Coast Football Club. However, he rejected all other offers and re-signed with Fremantle in September 2010 for an additional four years. He then later re-signed at the end of 2014 for another 3 years.

Mundy received his first All Australian selection in 2015 named in the 2015 All-Australian team on the interchange bench. A highlight in 2015 was during the Round 17 clash with the Richmond Football Club at the MCG. In the final minutes of the game, a Richmond kick out after a Fremantle behind was marked by Garrick Ibbotson who passed to Mundy approximately 45 metres out from goal. Mundy kicked a goal with 40 seconds left, leading Fremantle to a 4-point victory. He would repeat a very similar play again against Richmond at the MCG in 2017, when he marked the ball 25m out from goal with 11 seconds remaining in the game. He kicked a goal after the siren leading Fremantle to win by just 2 points.

In 2016, he was named the captain of Fremantle, however, the team headed into one of their worst seasons to date, with only four wins that year. In 2017, the captaincy was passed to Nathan Fyfe. He extended his contract for a further year early in the 2017 season.

Mundy was the second Fremantle player to reach 300 games, after Matthew Pavlich. His 300th game was during Fremantle's 19 point win over the Western Bulldogs at Optus Stadium in round 6 2019. In early 2021, Mundy's longevity became the subject of discussion, as he was widely considered to be in career-best form despite his advanced age for an Australian rules footballer.

On 21 July 2021, Mundy signed a one-year deal to remain with the Fremantle for the 2022 season. Four days later, he made his 350th appearance in a match against the Sydney Swans.

On 1 August 2022, Mundy announced his intention to retire at the end of the 2022 season. Mundy's last game was during Fremantle's semi-final against Collingwood at the MCG. Mundy finished his career at Fremantle having played the eighth most games in VFL/AFL history.

== Personal life ==
Mundy completed a Bachelor of Marine Science at Murdoch University in 2019, after 7 years of study. He went on to complete an honours degree in the same field in 2021, where he studied the growth of the greenlip abalone in Augusta, and estimated the variability in growth across the Ocean Grown Abalone sea ranch.

== Honours and achievements ==
Team

- WAFL Premiership Player (Subiaco) 2004
- McClelland Trophy (Fremantle) 2015

Individual

- Fremantle games record holder
- All-Australian team: 2015
- Doig Medal: 2010
- Fremantle captain: 2016
- Ross Glendinning Medal 2013
- AFL Rising Star nominee: 2005
- Beacon Award: 2005
- Fremantle Life Member: 2012
- Fremantle 25 since ‘95 Team
- West Australian Football Hall of Fame inductee: 2026

== Statistics ==
Statistics are correct to the end of the 2022 season

Legend
G	Goals	K	Kicks	D	Disposals	T	Tackles
B	Behinds	H	Handballs	M	Marks

Season	Team	No.	Games	Totals							Averages (per game)							Votes
Season	Team	No.	Games	G	B	K	H	D	M	T	G	B	K	H	D	M	T	Votes
2005	Fremantle	16	17	1	3	136	128	264	78	23	0.1	0.2	8.0	7.5	15.5	4.6	1.4	0
2006	Fremantle	16	25	1	5	253	165	418	141	44	0.0	0.2	10.1	6.6	16.7	5.6	1.8	0
2007	Fremantle	16	22	10	2	218	135	353	123	49	0.4	0.1	9.9	6.1	16.0	5.6	2.2	0
2008	Fremantle	16	22	10	7	209	164	373	106	63	0.4	0.3	9.5	7.4	17.0	4.8	2.9	0
2009	Fremantle	16	22	15	14	217	194	411	110	69	0.7	0.6	9.9	8.8	18.7	5.0	3.1	0
2010	Fremantle	16	22	12	8	244	263	507	80	105	0.6	0.4	11.1	12.0	23.0	3.6	4.8	9
2011	Fremantle	16	12	7	5	137	148	285	44	68	0.6	0.4	11.4	12.3	23.8	3.7	5.7	1
2012	Fremantle	16	22	8	12	306	181	487	94	88	0.4	0.6	13.9	8.2	22.1	4.3	4.0	12
2013	Fremantle	16	22	7	9	318	214	532	90	120	0.3	0.4	14.5	9.7	24.2	4.1	5.4	16
2014	Fremantle	16	24	11	12	342	246	588	87	109	0.5	0.5	14.2	10.2	24.5	3.6	4.5	13
2015	Fremantle	16	23	10	4	301	317	618	94	119	0.4	0.2	13.1	13.8	26.9	4.1	5.2	19
2016	Fremantle	16	18	5	2	223	203	426	58	83	0.3	0.1	12.4	11.3	23.7	3.2	4.6	2
2017	Fremantle	16	21	13	9	215	233	448	80	87	0.6	0.4	10.2	11.1	21.3	3.8	4.1	5
2018	Fremantle	16	22	19	13	249	245	494	97	91	0.9	0.6	11.3	11.1	22.5	4.4	4.1	8
2019	Fremantle	16	22	8	7	230	272	502	60	86	0.4	0.3	10.5	12.4	22.8	2.7	3.9	8
2020 (Note: The 2020 season was played with 17 home-and-away matches per team (down from 22) and 16-minute quarters with time on (down from 20-minute quarters with time on) due to the impact of the COVID-19 pandemic.)	Fremantle	16	16	4	1	131	159	290	33	59	0.3	0.1	8.2	9.9	18.1	2.1	3.7	3
2021	Fremantle	16	22	15	7	248	305	553	68	87	0.7	0.3	11.3	13.9	25.1	3.1	4.0	20
2022	Fremantle	16	22	5	7	214	279	493	61	74	0.2	0.4	9.1	12.3	21.4	2.6	3.8	4
Career			376	161	127	4191	3851	8042	1504	1494	0.4	0.3	11.1	10.2	21.3	4.0	3.8	120
