= Zac Clarke =

Australian rules footballer (born 1990)

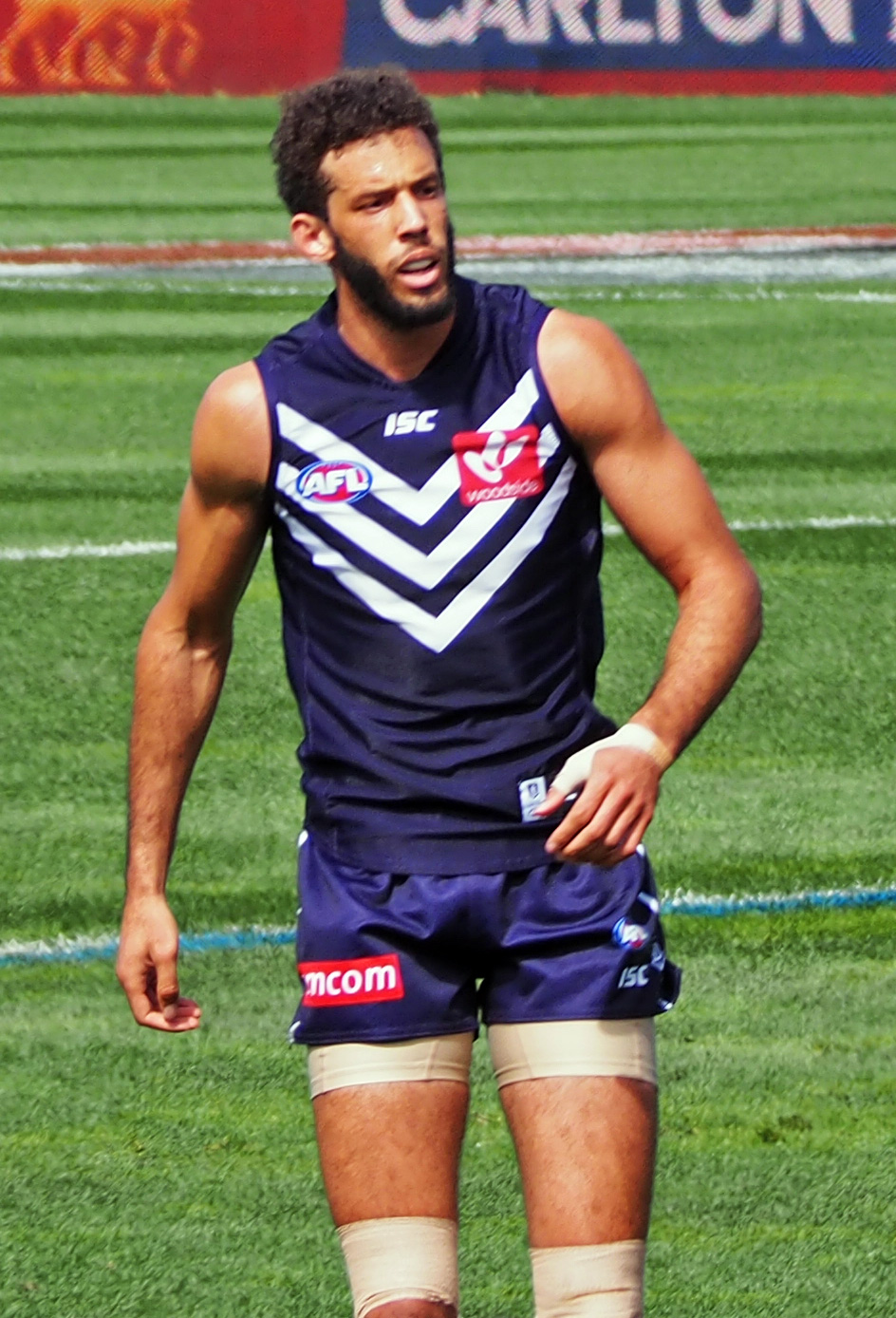
- Clarke playing for Fremantle in 2015

Personal information
- Full name: Zachary Clarke
- Born: 28 March 1990 (age 36)
- Original team: Oakleigh Chargers (TAC Cup)
- Draft: No. 37, 2008 national draft
- Height: 203 cm (6 ft 8 in)
- Weight: 96 kg (212 lb)
- Position: Ruckman

Playing career^{1}
Years	Club	Games (Goals)
2009–2017	Fremantle	101 (46)
2009–2012	East Perth	46 (29)
2013–2016	Peel Thunder	20 (14)
2018, 2023	Subiaco	41 (38)
2019	Essendon	9 (0)
Total		110 (46)
- ^{1} Playing statistics correct to the end of 2023.

Career highlights
- 2011 AFL Rising Star: nominee

Zachary Clarke (born 28 March 1990) is a former professional Australian rules footballer. He played for the Fremantle Football Club and Essendon Football Club in the Australian Football League (AFL).

== Early life ==
Clarke was born in Australia to an Australian mother and African-American father. He grew up in Melbourne in Victoria playing basketball, a fan of Kevin Garnett and dreamt of playing in the NBA. He represented Victoria in the youth state championships and was organising trails with US clubs before moving to Perth, Western Australia at age 18 when he gave up basketball and transitioned Australian rules.

== AFL career ==
Clarke was drafted with the 37th selection in the 2008 AFL draft after playing his first season of competitive football with the Oakleigh Chargers in the TAC Cup in 2008. He represented Victoria Metro at the 2008 AFL Under 18 Championships. At 203 cm, he had previously played basketball for the Nunawading Spectres and had hoped to play at a US College. An athletic player with good endurance, he lived with Fremantle's first choice ruckman, 211 cm Aaron Sandilands when he first moved to Western Australia. He attended Koonung Secondary College.

For the 2009 season, Clarke was allocated to play for East Perth Football Club in the West Australian Football League and after two impressive games was named in Fremantle's senior squad for their Round 3 match against Adelaide. He eventually made his debut in the round 13 clash against Collingwood Football Club after averaging an impressive 16 hit outs in the WAFL.

In round 20, 2011, following a strong performance against St Kilda, Clarke was nominated for the 2011 AFL Rising Star.

Clarke was delisted by Fremantle at the conclusion of the 2017 season, having missed much of the past two seasons through injury.

In November 2018, Clarke returned to AFL, joining Essendon via the newly implemented pre-season supplemental selection period.

In October 2019, Clarke was delisted by Essendon after 9 games in the 2019 season.

== Statistics ==
Statistics are correct to the end of the 2016 season

Legend
G	Goals	K	Kicks	D	Disposals	T	Tackles
B	Behinds	H	Handballs	M	Marks	H/O	Hit-outs

Season	Team	No.	Games	Totals								Averages (per game)							
Season	Team	No.	Games	G	B	K	H	D	M	T	H/O	G	B	K	H	D	M	T	H/O
2009	Fremantle	30	5	0	0	9	36	45	8	10	35	0.0	0.0	1.8	7.2	9.0	1.6	2.0	7.0
2010	Fremantle	30	3	0	1	3	17	20	3	12	25	0.0	0.3	1.0	5.7	6.7	1.0	4.0	8.3
2011	Fremantle	30	13	6	6	62	115	177	42	68	172	0.5	0.5	4.8	8.8	13.6	3.2	5.2	13.2
2012	Fremantle	30	15	13	13	105	67	172	67	48	121	0.9	0.9	7.0	4.5	11.5	4.5	3.2	8.1
2013	Fremantle	30	17	8	3	84	142	226	68	57	355	0.5	0.2	4.9	8.4	13.3	4.0	3.4	20.9
2014	Fremantle	30	21	12	10	132	126	258	92	57	252	0.6	0.5	6.3	6.0	12.3	4.4	2.7	12.0
2015	Fremantle	30	14	7	2	73	75	148	57	28	162	0.5	0.1	5.2	5.4	10.6	4.1	2.0	11.6
2016	Fremantle	30	13	0	3	37	89	126	37	35	249	0.0	0.2	2.8	6.8	9.7	2.8	2.7	19.2
Career			101	46	38	505	667	1172	374	315	1371	0.5	0.4	5.0	6.6	11.6	3.7	3.1	13.6
