= Matt de Boer =

Australian rules footballer

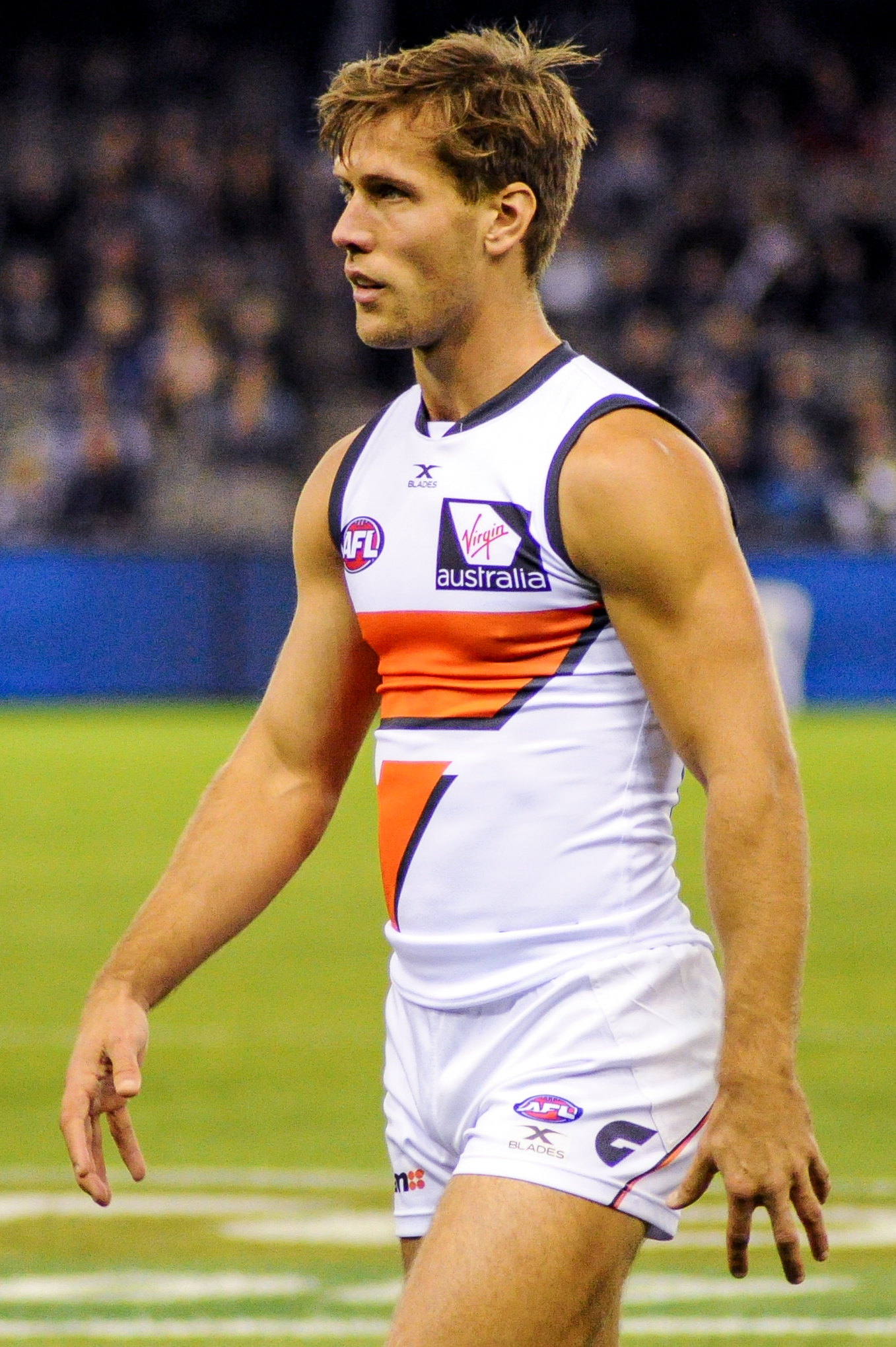
- De Boer in June 2017.

Personal information
- Full name: Matthew de Boer
- Born: 10 March 1990 (age 36)
- Original team: Claremont (WAFL)
- Draft: No. 19 2009 rookie draft
- Height: 189 cm (6 ft 2 in)
- Weight: 88 kg (194 lb)
- Position: Midfielder / Tagger

Playing career^{1}
Years	Club	Games (Goals)
2009–2016	Fremantle	138 (48)
2017–2022	Greater Western Sydney	85 (30)
Total		223 (78)
- ^{1} Playing statistics correct to the end of Round 23, 2022.

Career highlights
- Peel Thunder Premiership side 2016; Peel Thunder Best and Fairest 2016

Matthew de Boer (born 10 March 1990) is a former Australian rules footballer who played for the Fremantle Football Club and the Greater Western Sydney Giants in the Australian Football League (AFL).

After representing Western Australia at the 2008 AFL Under 18 Championships and being named in the under 18 All-Australian team, de Boer was drafted to Fremantle in the 2009 rookie draft with Fremantle's second selection, number 19 overall. After displaying good form during the 2009 pre-season, he was elevated to Fremantle's senior list as a nominated rookie, along with Greg Broughton.

De Boer made his AFL debut for Fremantle in round 6 of the 2009 AFL season at Subiaco Oval in the Western Derby against the West Coast Eagles, as a replacement for the injured Rhys Palmer. He was delisted at the conclusion of the 2016 season, however, he was drafted by Greater Western Sydney in the 2016 AFL draft.

While at Greater Western Sydney, De Boer earned prominence for his shut-down role on 2017 Brownlow Medallist Dustin Martin, restricting him to only 15 disposals in his side's 49-point win over Richmond in round three of the 2019 AFL season.

== Statistics ==
Statistics are correct to the end of the 2018 season

Legend
G	Goals	K	Kicks	D	Disposals	T	Tackles
B	Behinds	H	Handballs	M	Marks

Season	Team	No.	Games	Totals							Averages (per game)						
Season	Team	No.	Games	G	B	K	H	D	M	T	G	B	K	H	D	M	T
2009	Fremantle	40	17	5	4	89	125	214	56	64	0.3	0.2	5.2	7.4	12.6	3.3	3.8
2010	Fremantle	40	20	6	12	92	145	237	56	75	0.3	0.6	4.6	7.2	11.8	2.8	3.8
2011	Fremantle	40	16	3	2	84	139	223	43	84	0.2	0.1	5.2	8.7	13.9	2.7	5.2
2012	Fremantle	40	23	15	10	188	222	410	102	138	0.6	0.4	8.2	9.6	17.8	4.4	6.0
2013	Fremantle	9	25	10	7	172	216	388	87	145	0.4	0.3	6.9	8.6	15.5	3.5	5.8
2014	Fremantle	9	14	4	2	96	126	222	42	78	0.3	0.1	6.9	9.0	15.9	3.0	5.6
2015	Fremantle	9	19	4	2	92	158	250	55	106	0.2	0.1	4.8	8.3	13.2	2.9	5.6
2016	Fremantle	9	4	1	0	17	43	60	11	27	0.2	0.0	4.2	10.8	15.0	2.8	6.8
2017	Greater Western Sydney	24	15	8	3	65	142	207	39	70	0.5	0.2	4.3	9.5	13.8	2.6	4.7
2018	Greater Western Sydney	24	15	14	6	102	181	283	51	61	0.9	0.4	6.8	12.1	18.9	3.4	4.1
