= Paul Duffield =

Australian rules footballer, born 1985

Personal information
- Full name: Paul Duffield
- Born: 5 February 1985 (age 41)
- Original teams: South Fremantle, WAFL
- Draft: 2004 Rookie Draft
- Height: 187 cm (6 ft 2 in)
- Weight: 89 kg (196 lb)
- Position: Defender

Playing career^{1}
Years	Club	Games (Goals)
2003–2015	Fremantle	171 (33)

International team honours^{2}
Years	Team	Games (Goals)
2010	Australia	2
- ^{1} Playing statistics correct to the end of 2015.^{2} Representative statistics correct as of 2010.

Career highlights
- Fremantle Life Member: 2014

Paul Duffield (born 5 February 1985) is a former professional Australian rules footballer who played for the Fremantle Football Club in the Australian Football League (AFL). He plays mainly as a half back flanker and began his football career at South Fremantle Football Club in the West Australian Football League.

== Early life ==
Duffield is an old boy of Aquinas College, Perth and was School Captain in his final year, 2002.

== Fremantle Dockers ==
Selected in the rookie draft at the 2003 AFL draft, he is a medium-sized defender who spent the 2004 and 2005 seasons on the rookie list, playing for South Fremantle. He was a member of South Fremantle's 2005 premiership team. At Fremantle he was allocated guernsey number 41.

Due to the AFL rules restricting rookies to a maximum of two years before being elevated or delisted, Duffield was delisted at the end of the 2005 season. However, Fremantle reselected him in the 2005 rookie draft. Duffield made his AFL pre-season debut against Collingwood in the quarter-final and also played in the semi-final loss to Geelong.

On 19 April 2006, it was announced that Duffield had been elevated to the senior list as a replacement for Daniel Haines, who had injured his achilles tendon the previous weekend playing for Peel Thunder. Duffield then made his debut a week later against St Kilda in the controversial game at Aurora Stadium in Launceston, Tasmania.

After playing in the last six games in 2008, Duffield cemented his spot in the Fremantle team in 2009, only missing one game. He finished fourth in the club's best and fairest award.

In 2010 he was selected in the Australian international rules football team for the 2010 International Rules Series against Ireland.

Duffield was a member of the Dockers' 2013 Grand Final team.

Duffield announced his retirement at the conclusion of the 2015 season.

== Statistics ==
Legend
G	Goals	K	Kicks	D	Disposals	T	Tackles
B	Behinds	H	Handballs	M	Marks

Season	Team	No.	Games	Totals							Averages (per game)						
Season	Team	No.	Games	G	B	K	H	D	M	T	G	B	K	H	D	M	T
2006	Fremantle	41	7	0	1	61	39	100	33	15	0.0	0.1	8.7	5.6	14.3	4.7	2.1
2007	Fremantle	41	6	3	1	47	32	79	23	18	0.5	0.2	7.8	5.3	13.2	3.8	3.0
2008	Fremantle	41	11	5	2	94	53	147	48	40	0.4	0.2	8.6	4.8	13.4	4.4	3.6
2009	Fremantle	41	21	5	7	330	144	474	98	76	0.2	0.3	15.7	6.9	22.6	4.7	3.6
2010	Fremantle	41	24	6	2	356	143	499	131	94	0.2	0.1	14.8	6.0	20.8	5.5	3.9
2011	Fremantle	41	21	2	8	217	137	354	73	86	0.1	0.4	10.3	6.5	16.9	3.5	4.1
2012	Fremantle	41	21	2	1	300	102	402	117	75	0.1	0.0	14.3	4.9	19.1	5.6	3.6
2013	Fremantle	41	22	4	5	318	85	403	130	63	0.2	0.2	14.4	3.9	18.3	5.9	2.9
2014	Fremantle	41	24	6	4	299	151	450	121	98	0.2	0.2	12.5	6.3	18.8	5.0	4.1
2015	Fremantle	41	14	0	1	131	69	200	54	54	0.0	0.1	9.4	4.9	14.3	3.9	3.9
Career			171	33	32	2153	955	3108	828	619	0.2	0.2	12.6	5.6	18.2	4.8	3.6

== Personal life ==
Duffield is the nephew of The West Australian newspaper sports journalist, Mark Duffield. His father, Wayne and uncles Brett and Mark, were all successful country footballers.

Duffield's cousin, Ryan Duffield, is a former cricketer. He is also a cousin of Paris Duffield, a basketball player who has played in the NBL1 West.
