= 2023 AFL Rising Star =

Australian football award

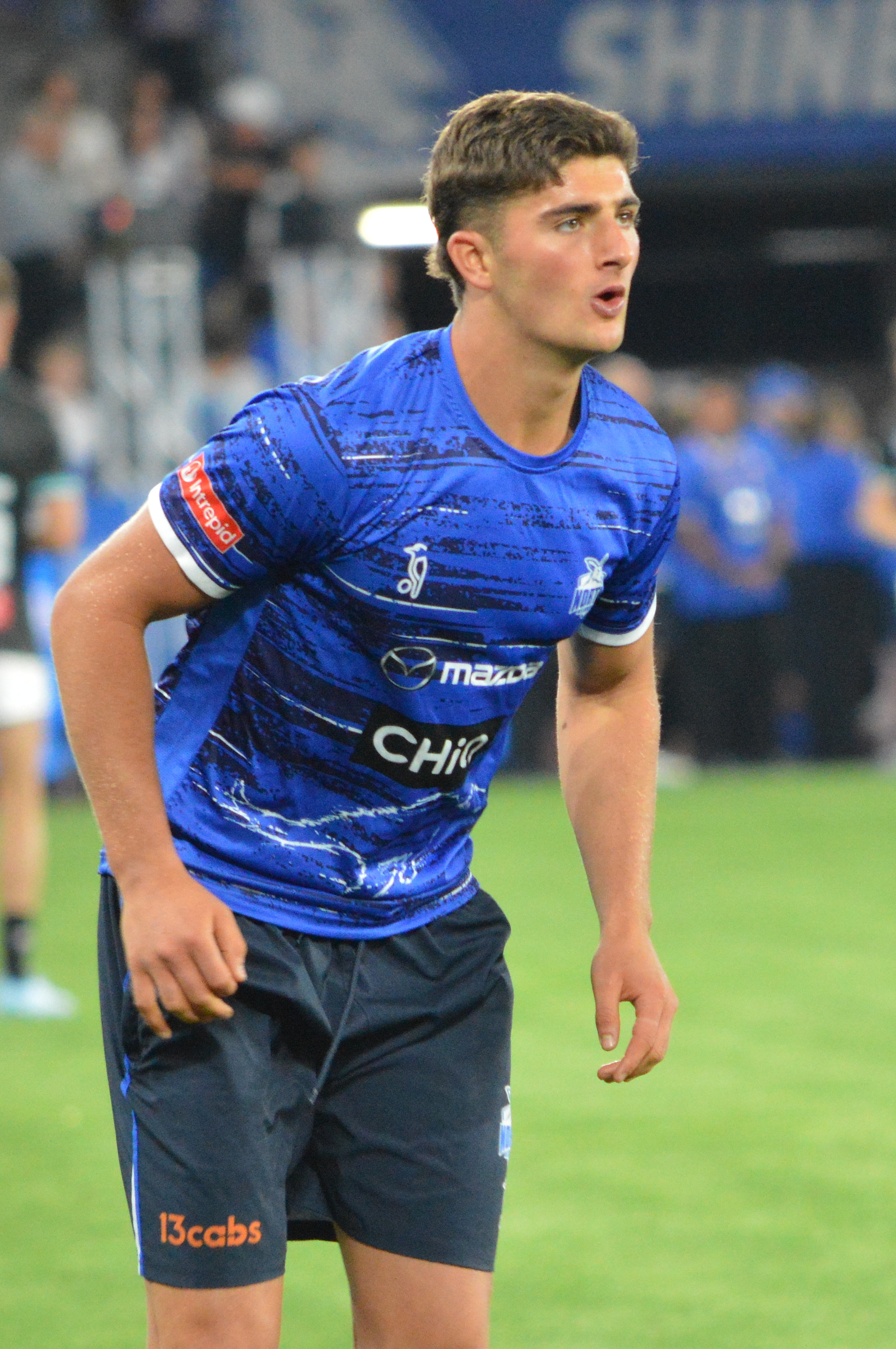
- Harry Sheezel, recipient of the 2023 Rising Star award
- Date: 30 August 2023
- Country: Australia
- Ron Evans medallist: Harry Sheezel (North Melbourne)

The AFL Rising Star award is given annually to a standout young player in the Australian Football League (AFL). In 2023, the award was won by North Melbourne player Harry Sheezel.

== Eligibility ==
Every round, a nomination is given to a standout young player who performed well during that particular round. To be eligible for nomination, a player must be under 21 on 1 January of that year and have played ten or fewer senior games before the start of the season; a player who is suspended may be nominated, but is not eligible to win the award.

== Nominations ==
2023 AFL Rising Star nominees
Round	Player	Club	Ref.
1	Harry Sheezel	North Melbourne	
2	Will Ashcroft	Brisbane Lions	
3	Reuben Ginbey	West Coast	
4	Mitch Owens	St Kilda	
5	Max Michalanney	Adelaide	
6	Jai Culley	West Coast	
7	Finn Callaghan	Greater Western Sydney	
8	Mattaes Phillipou	St Kilda	
9	Bailey Humphrey	Gold Coast	
10	Josh Weddle	Hawthorn	
11	Jye Amiss	Fremantle	
12	Jacob van Rooyen	Melbourne	
13	George Wardlaw	North Melbourne	
14	Darcy Wilmot	Brisbane Lions	
15	Angus Sheldrick	Sydney	
16	Luke Pedlar*	Adelaide	
17	Seamus Mitchell	Hawthorn	
18	Judd McVee	Melbourne	
19	Jaspa Fletcher	Brisbane Lions	
20	Mac Andrew*	Gold Coast	
21	Oliver Hollands	Carlton	
22	Elijah Hewett	West Coast	
23	Matthew Johnson*	Fremantle	
24	Eddie Ford	North Melbourne	

*ineligible to win the Rising Star due to suspension.

== Final voting ==
The winner was decided by an 11-person panel consisting of Gillon McLachlan (chair), Eddie Betts, Jude Bolton, Nathan Buckley, Kane Cornes, Andrew Dillon, Glen Jakovich, Laura Kane, Cameron Ling, Matthew Pavlich and Kevin Sheehan. Each member awarded five votes to the player they determined most deserving, four votes to the second-most deserving, and so on to one vote to the fifth-most deserving. Panellists were unanimous on the top four (Jye Amiss, Will Ashcroft, Mitch Owens and Harry Sheezel), but not their order.

=== Vote receivers ===
	Player	Club	Votes
1	Harry Sheezel	North Melbourne	54
2	Will Ashcroft	Brisbane Lions	39
3	Mitch Owens	St Kilda	33
4	Jye Amiss	Fremantle	28
5	Darcy Wilmot	Brisbane Lions	4
6	Finn Callaghan	Greater Western Sydney	3
6	Max Michalanney	Adelaide	3
8	George Wardlaw	North Melbourne	1

=== Full votes ===
Panel member	5 votes	4 votes	3 votes	2 votes	1 vote
Gillon McLachlan (chair)	Harry Sheezel (North Melbourne)	Mitch Owens (St Kilda)	Will Ashcroft (Brisbane Lions)	Jye Amiss (Fremantle)	Darcy Wilmot (Brisbane Lions)
Eddie Betts	Harry Sheezel (North Melbourne)	Will Ashcroft (Brisbane Lions)	Mitch Owens (St Kilda)	Jye Amiss (Fremantle)	George Wardlaw (North Melbourne)
Jude Bolton	Harry Sheezel (North Melbourne)	Will Ashcroft (Brisbane Lions)	Jye Amiss (Fremantle)	Mitch Owens (St Kilda)	Max Michalanney (Adelaide)
Nathan Buckley	Mitch Owens (St Kilda)	Harry Sheezel (North Melbourne)	Will Ashcroft (Brisbane Lions)	Jye Amiss (Fremantle)	Finn Callaghan (Greater Western Sydney)
Kane Cornes	Harry Sheezel (North Melbourne)	Mitch Owens (St Kilda)	Will Ashcroft (Brisbane Lions)	Jye Amiss (Fremantle)	Max Michalanney (Adelaide)
Andrew Dillon	Harry Sheezel (North Melbourne)	Will Ashcroft (Brisbane Lions)	Mitch Owens (St Kilda)	Jye Amiss (Fremantle)	Finn Callaghan (Greater Western Sydney)
Glen Jakovich	Harry Sheezel (North Melbourne)	Will Ashcroft (Brisbane Lions)	Jye Amiss (Fremantle)	Mitch Owens (St Kilda)	Max Michalanney (Adelaide)
Laura Kane	Harry Sheezel (North Melbourne)	Will Ashcroft (Brisbane Lions)	Mitch Owens (St Kilda)	Jye Amiss (Fremantle)	Darcy Wilmot (Brisbane Lions)
Cameron Ling	Harry Sheezel (North Melbourne)	Jye Amiss (Fremantle)	Will Ashcroft (Brisbane Lions)	Mitch Owens (St Kilda)	Darcy Wilmot (Brisbane Lions)
Matthew Pavlich	Harry Sheezel (North Melbourne)	Jye Amiss (Fremantle)	Will Ashcroft (Brisbane Lions)	Mitch Owens (St Kilda)	Finn Callaghan (Greater Western Sydney)
Kevin Sheehan	Harry Sheezel (North Melbourne)	Will Ashcroft (Brisbane Lions)	Mitch Owens (St Kilda)	Jye Amiss (Fremantle)	Darcy Wilmot (Brisbane Lions)
