= SW FL =

SW FL could relate to one of the following:

- Southwest Florida
- South West Football League
