= Jye Amiss =

Australian rules football player (born 2003)

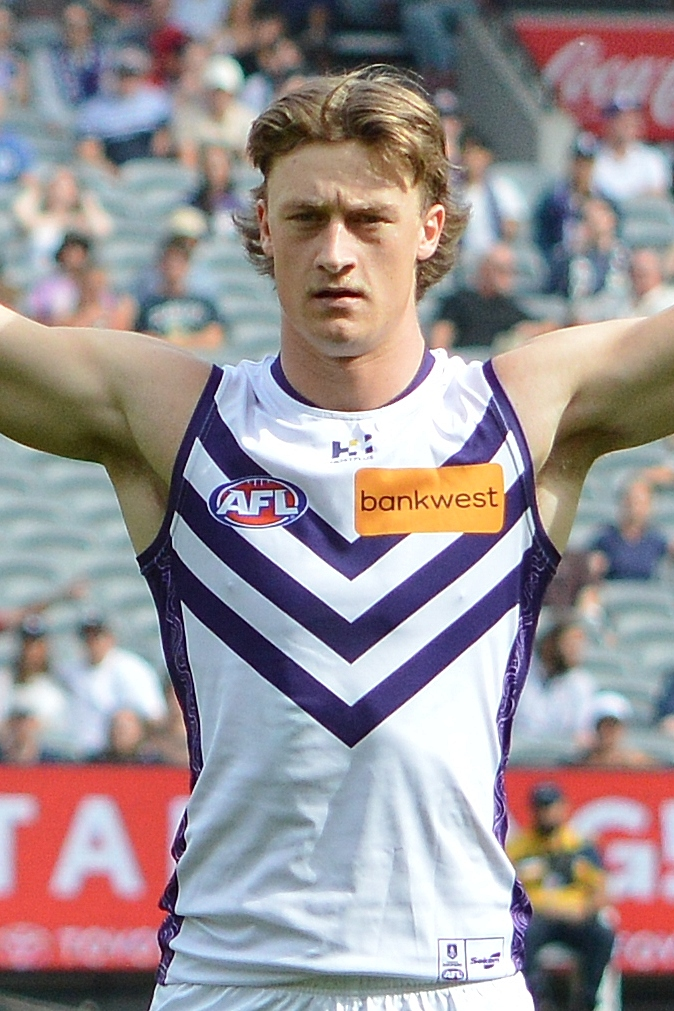
- Amiss in April 2025

Personal information
- Nicknames: Nev, dead eye,
- Born: 31 July 2003 (age 23); Busselton, Western Australia
- Original team: Busselton Football Club (SWFL)/East Perth (WAFL)
- Draft: No. 8, 2021 national draft
- Height: 196 cm (6 ft 5 in)
- Weight: 83 kg (183 lb)
- Position: Key forward

Club information
- Current club: Fremantle
- Number: 24

Playing career^{1}
Years	Club	Games (Goals)
2022–	Fremantle	97 (177)
- ^{1} Playing statistics correct to the end of 2026.

Career highlights
- Rising Star nominee: 2023; Beacon Award: 2023; 2x Fremantle leading goalkicker: 2023, 2026; 2x 22under22 team: 2023, 2024

Jye Amiss (/ˈeɪməs/ AY-məs; born 31 July 2003) is an Australian rules footballer who plays for the Fremantle Football Club in the Australian Football League (AFL).

== Early career ==
Amiss grew up in Busselton, Western Australia. He attended Vasse Primary School and later Cape Naturaliste College, where he played school football. He also played local junior and senior football for the Busselton Football Club in the South West Football League, and represented Western Australia at under-19s level.

== Career ==
=== 2022: Debut season ===
Amiss was drafted with Fremantle's first selection, the 8th overall, in the 2021 national draft. He made his debut in round 8 of the 2022 AFL season against North Melbourne kicking two goals on debut, including a goal with his first kick. Amiss suffered a kidney injury while playing for Peel Thunder in the WAFL, and had to undergo surgery which saw him sidelined for 12 weeks. Amiss made his AFL return during Fremantle's elimination final against the Western Bulldogs at Optus Stadium, kicking two goals.

=== 2023: Leading goalkicker ===
He was surprisingly left out of the Fremantle line-up for their opening game of the season against St Kilda. In Round 10 of the 2023 AFL season, Amiss kicked 3 goals in Fremantle's 29-point win over Geelong. He was awarded a Rising Star nomination the following week in Round 11, kicking 3 goals in Fremantle's 7-point win over Melbourne at the MCG. Amiss kicked a career-high four goals in Round 16 against the Western Bulldogs. He also kicked an equal career-high four goals in Round 22 against the West Coast Eagles during Western Derby 57. In July, Amiss signed a six-year contract extension tying him to Fremantle until at least the end of 2029. He finished the season as Fremantle's leading goalkicker, having kicked 41 goals in just his second season of AFL football.

=== 2024: Consistency and cohesion ===
Amiss made the line-up for Fremantle's opening game of the season against Brisbane Lions at Optus Stadium. He kicked four goals and earnt a Mark of the Year nomination in the 23-point come from behind win. Amiss also kicked four goals in Round 12 during Fremantle's 92 point victory over Melbourne at Traeger Park in Alice Springs. He finished the match having earnt his second Mark of the Year nomination. Amiss finished the season with 36 goals, which placed him second in the club's leading goalkicker award, only behind Josh Treacy.

=== 2025 ===
Amiss finished the 2025 AFL season with 32 goals from 24 games, slightly down from his past two seasons. He finished third in Fremantle's leading goalkicker tally, behind Josh Treacy (44) and second-year recruit Patrick Voss (37).

=== 2026 ===
Amiss had a frustrating start to the 2026 AFL season, with calls for him to be dropped after kicking just one goal in his first two games. In Round 6, Amiss kicked a career-best five goals against the West Coast Eagles in Western Derby 62. He placed second in the Glendinning–Allan Medal voting with six votes, only behind Jordan Clark, and also broke the club record for marks inside 50, with nine. The match saw him poll a perfect 10 coaches' votes. He would kick a further 16 goals across his next six games, including four goals in each of rounds 11 & 12 against St Kilda and Brisbane, respectively, to bring his total goals to 30 after Round 12.

In Round 22 against Melbourne at the MCG, Amiss kicked an equal career-high five goals, the second of which being his fiftieth goal for the season, making him the first Docker to have kicked 50 goals since Matthew Pavlich in 2012. He would kick another 5 goals the next week against Adelaide, bringing his total for the year to 58 with one round remaining. Amiss was expected to play in Round 24 against Carlton. However, he wasn't selected and was instead managed after a minor ankle injury at training during the week, thus finishing the home-and-away season on 58 goals. In August, Amiss was one-of-eight Fremantle players named in the initial 46-man All-Australian squad. He finished the season as Fremantle's leading goalkicker, having kicked 64 goals from 26 games.

== Statistics ==
Updated to the end of 2026.

Legend
G	Goals	K	Kicks	D	Disposals	T	Tackles
B	Behinds	H	Handballs	M	Marks

Season	Team	No.	Games	Totals							Averages (per game)							Votes
Season	Team	No.	Games	G	B	K	H	D	M	T	G	B	K	H	D	M	T	Votes
2022	Fremantle	24	3	4	1	21	7	28	13	2	1.3	0.3	7.0	2.3	9.3	4.3	0.7	0
2023	Fremantle	24	22	41	17	112	56	168	79	30	1.9	0.8	5.1	2.5	7.6	3.6	1.4	0
2024	Fremantle	24	22	36	28	133	46	179	82	30	1.6	1.3	6.0	2.1	8.1	3.7	1.4	1
2025	Fremantle	24	24	32	16	113	58	171	82	23	1.3	0.7	4.7	2.4	7.1	3.4	1.0	0
2026	Fremantle	24	26	64	34	175	66	241	117	25	2.5	1.3	6.7	2.5	9.3	4.5	1.0	0
Career			97	177	96	554	233	787	373	110	1.8	1.0	5.7	2.4	8.1	3.9	1.1	1
