= Matt Taberner =

Australian rules footballer (born 1993)

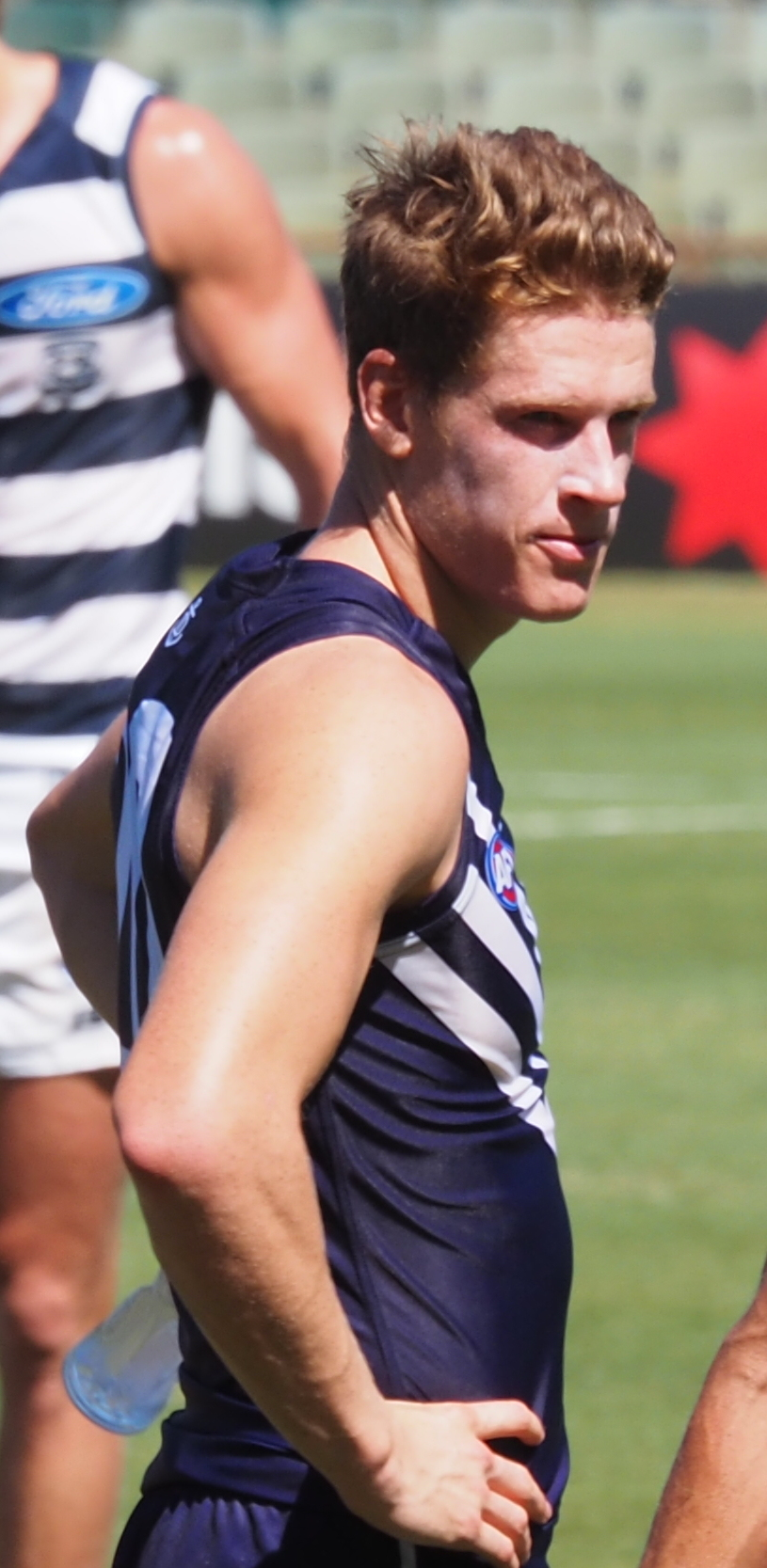
- Taberner playing for Fremantle in 2016

Personal information
- Full name: Matthew Taberner
- Nickname: Crab
- Born: 17 June 1993 (age 33)
- Original teams: Bright, Myrtleford (OMFL), Murray Bushrangers (Talent League)
- Debut: Round 13, 23 June 2013, Fremantle vs. North Melbourne, at Patersons Stadium
- Height: 199 cm (6 ft 6 in)
- Weight: 102 kg (225 lb)
- Position: Forward

Playing career
Years	Club	Games (Goals)
2013–2024	Fremantle	125 (173)

Career highlights
- 2x Fremantle leading goalkicker: 2020, 2021; AFL Rising Star nominee: 2014; 2x Peel Thunder leading goal kicker: 2014, 2017; 2x Peel Thunder premiership player: 2017, 2024; Beacon Award winner: 2014

Matthew Taberner (born 17 June 1993) is a former Australian rules footballer who last played for the Fremantle Football Club in the Australian Football League (AFL). He mainly played as a key position forward. Drafted in 2013, Taberner was twice Fremantle's leading goalkicker and played 125 games before being delisted in 2024.

== Early life ==
Originally from Bright, Victoria, Taberner played for Myrtleford in the Ovens & Murray Football League and the Murray Bushrangers in the TAC Cup. He was drafted to Fremantle with the 11th selection at the 2013 rookie draft. Taberner missed the start of the 2013 season due to a bout of glandular fever. He made his debut for Peel Thunder in the West Australian Football League (WAFL) in the 6th round of the 2013 WAFL season, and kicking 9 goals from his next 7 matches.

== AFL career ==
=== Early career ===
Taberner made his AFL debut in Round 13, 2013 against North Melbourne at Patersons Stadium. He struggled to hold his place in the side, playing only four games in 2013 and six in 2014, before an impressive performance against Brisbane Lions in Round 22 earned him a nomination for the 2014 AFL Rising Star. Playing as Fremantle's only tall forward due to captain Matthew Pavlich's late withdrawal due to injury, Taberner collected 24 disposals, took 10 marks and kicked a goal as Fremantle thrashed Brisbane by 58 points.

Taberner was out of contract at the end of the 2017 season, and due to poor form wasn't selected by Fremantle early in the season. In the second half of the season he lifted his output for WAFL side Peel Thunder, forcing his way into the senior side for the final three matches. He played only eight games for Fremantle and kicked 11 goals in the 2017 season. At the end of 2017, after putting contract talks on hold, he eventually signed a two-year contract extension, keeping him at the club until the end of 2019. One of his standout performances came against Essendon at Domain Stadium in round 7. He finished the game with 4 goals, 9 marks and 18 disposals. The dockers beat Essendon in that game by 37 points. Starting off the 2018 season in strong form, he fractured a metatarsal bone in his left foot in the Round 5 clash with the Western Bulldogs. He later returned, after 15 weeks recovering from his injury, in time for the Round 20 Western Derby against West Coast. He finished the season having played 9 games, and kicking 10 goals.

Taberner started 2019 in brilliant fashion, with his strong marking ability displayed regularly. His standout game came against GWS in Round 5, where he kicked 3.3, amassed 21 disposals, took 13 marks, and was arguably Fremantle's best player on the day. Unfortunately, his 2019 season came to an abrupt end as a result of a stress fracture in his left foot, after the Round 9 clash with Essendon. He finished the season having kicked 13.10, and amassing 24 contested marks (avg. of 2.7 per game) from his 9 games.

=== Leading goalkicker ===
2020 was a breakout season for Taberner, who finished the season as Fremantle's leading goalkicker with 29 goals (from 16 games), which also placed him in equal 4th for the Coleman medal. Taberner was second in the AFL for contested marks, finishing the season with 38 (an average of 2.4 per game). He was named in the initial 40 man squad for the All-Australian team but was overlooked in the final team announcement.

Taberner signed a three-year contract extension with Fremantle at the start of the 2021 season. He kicked four goals in round five against Adelaide, and four again the next round against North Melbourne. Western Derby 53 saw Taberner play perhaps his best game of the season, he kicked three goals in the opening quarter helping the Dockers to secure a 30 point lead at quarter time. Fremantle would ultimately win the game by 15 points. He finished the season as Fremantle's leading goalkicker for the second season in a row, with 37 goals from 16 games.

=== Late career ===
Round five of the 2022 AFL season saw Taberner receive much praise for his performance against Essendon at Marvel Stadium kicking a career-best seven goal haul.

After missing most of 2023 due to injury, Taberner returned to Fremantle's line-up in round two of the 2024 AFL season against North Melbourne, as a replacement for injured forward Brennan Cox. He kicked two goals during the third quarter. He again kicked two goals the next week during Fremantle's 35 point win over the Adelaide at Optus Stadium. Taberner was not offered a contract by Fremantle following only five AFL games in the 2024 season, seemingly ending his AFL career. He continued playing for Peel Thunder during their 2024 finals campaign, a highlight being his 5 goal effort in the preliminary finals against Swan Districts at Bassendean Oval. Taberner played in his second WAFL premiership at the end of 2024 for Peel Thunder.

== Statistics ==
Legend
G	Goals	K	Kicks	D	Disposals	T	Tackles
B	Behinds	H	Handballs	M	Marks

Season	Team	No.	Games	Totals							Averages (per game)							Votes
Season	Team	No.	Games	G	B	K	H	D	M	T	G	B	K	H	D	M	T	Votes
2013	Fremantle	42	4	2	0	18	11	29	11	9	0.5	0.0	4.5	2.8	7.3	2.8	2.3	0
2014	Fremantle	20	9	7	6	61	31	92	40	25	0.8	0.7	6.8	3.4	10.2	4.4	2.8	0
2015	Fremantle	20	15	14	7	83	42	125	51	20	0.9	0.5	5.5	2.8	8.3	3.4	1.3	0
2016	Fremantle	20	17	18	6	121	89	210	82	41	1.1	0.4	7.1	5.2	12.4	4.8	2.4	0
2017	Fremantle	20	8	11	6	65	27	92	43	20	1.4	0.8	8.1	3.4	11.5	5.4	2.5	0
2018	Fremantle	20	9	10	7	88	47	135	48	12	1.1	0.8	9.8	5.2	15.0	5.3	1.3	0
2019	Fremantle	20	9	13	10	105	44	149	72	18	1.4	1.1	11.7	4.9	16.6	8.0	2.0	2
2020 (Note: The 2020 season was played with 17 home-and-away matches per team (down from 22) and 16-minute quarters with time on (down from 20-minute quarters with time on) due to the impact of the COVID-19 pandemic.)	Fremantle	20	16	29	13	129	37	166	92	8	1.8	0.8	8.1	2.3	10.4	5.8	0.5	3
2021	Fremantle	20	16	37	17	135	42	177	89	10	2.3	1.1	8.4	2.6	11.1	5.6	0.6	2
2022	Fremantle	20	13	23	8	100	24	124	63	13	1.8	0.6	7.7	1.8	9.5	4.8	1.0	3
2023	Fremantle	20	4	3	0	20	16	36	19	3	0.8	0.0	5.0	4.0	9.0	4.8	0.8	0
2024	Fremantle	20	5	6	2	21	12	33	13	6	1.2	0.4	4.2	2.4	6.6	2.6	1.2	0
Career			125	173	82	946	422	1368	623	185	1.4	0.7	7.6	3.4	10.9	5.0	1.5	10
