= Busselton Football Club =

Australian rules football club

Busselton
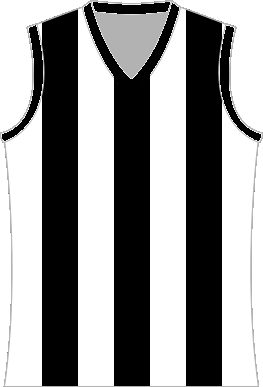

Names
- Full name: Busselton Football and Sportsmen Club
- Nickname: Magpies

Club details
- Founded: 1955
- Colours: Black White
- Competition: South West Football League
- Premierships: 7 (1964, 1967, 1978, 1996, 2012, 2015, 2023
- Ground: Sir Stewart Bovell Park, Busselton W.A.

The Busselton Football Club is an Australian rules football club which competes in the South West Football League in the South West corner of Western Australia.

It is based in the Western Australian city of Busselton. The club is the result of a merger between East Busselton and West Busselton in 1955. It has played all its games in South West Football League.

== Club history ==
In 1954 two Busselton based clubs, East Busselton and West Busselton joined the then Bunbury-Collie FL. Impressed by the improved standard in play the two clubs decided to merge to form a more competitive team, the Busselton Football Club was created.

== Premierships ==
- 1964, 1967, 1978, 1996, 2012, 2015, 2023

== Notable players ==
- Ashton Hams
- Graham House (cricketer)
- Phil Kelly
- Demi Liddle
- Jye Amiss
