= Mitch Owens =

Australian rules footballer (born 2003)

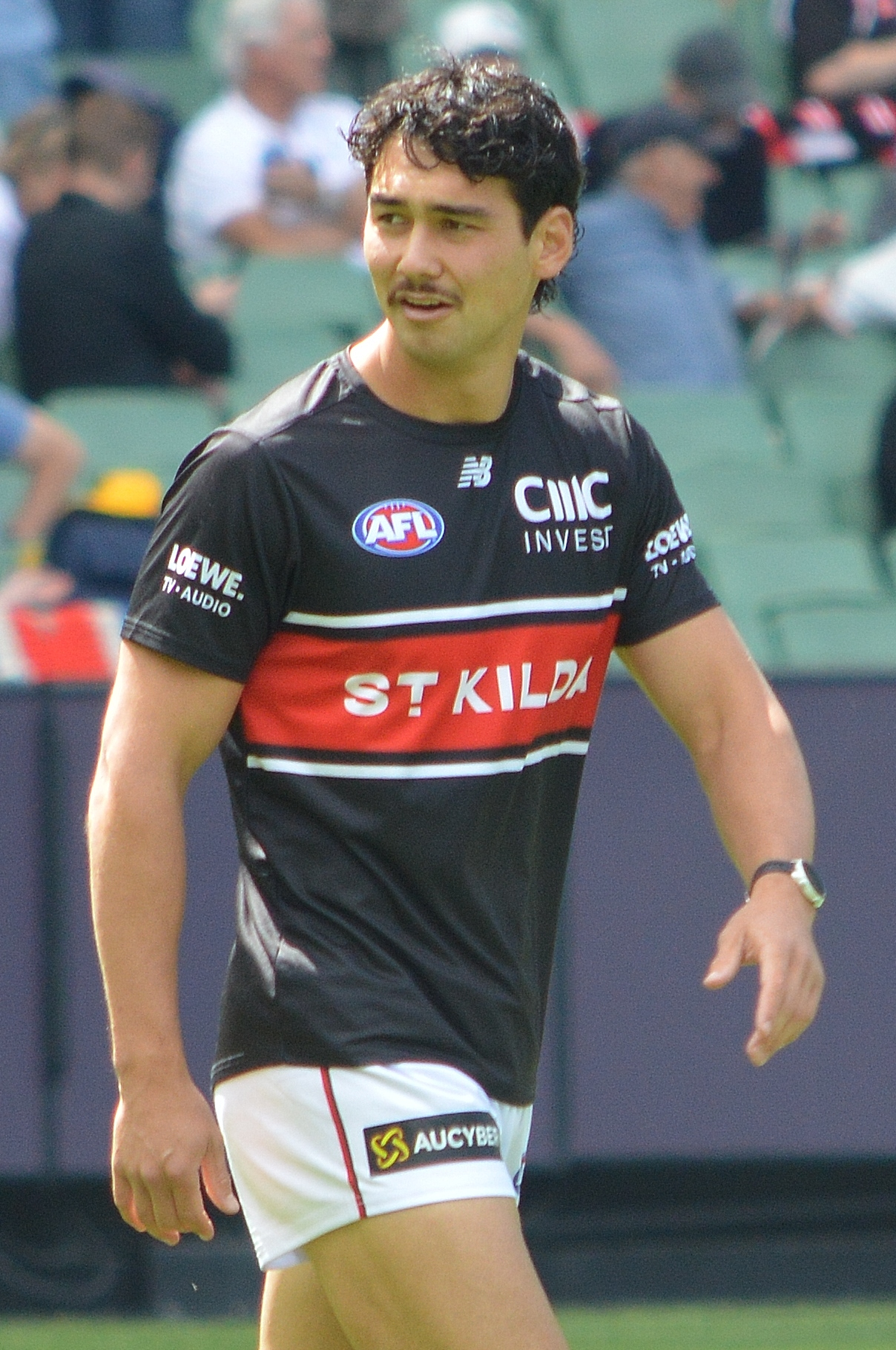
- Owens in March 2026

Personal information
- Full name: Mitchito Owens
- Born: 24 September 2003 (age 23)
- Original team: Sandringham Dragons
- Draft: No. 33, 2021 AFL draft
- Debut: Round 1, 2022, St Kilda vs. Collingwood, at Marvel Stadium
- Height: 191 cm (6 ft 3 in)
- Weight: 85 kg (187 lb)
- Position: Midfielder

Club information
- Current club: St Kilda
- Number: 10

Playing career^{1}
Years	Club	Games (Goals)
2022–	St Kilda	92 (103)
- ^{1} Playing statistics correct to the end of the 2026 season.

Career highlights
- 2023 AFL Rising Star nominee; 22under22 team: 2023

Mitchito Owens (born 24 September 2003) is a professional Australian rules footballer playing for the St Kilda Football Club in the Australian Football League (AFL). He was drafted in the 2021 AFL draft at pick number 33 overall.

== Early life ==
Playing for Beaumaris as a junior, Owens was awarded best on ground in the upset 2015 grand final win over Prahran. He played forward pocket for Beaumaris in 2019 and played school football for Mentone Grammar in the Associated Grammar Schools of Victoria competition.

Owens was a member of St Kilda's Next Generation Academy, a pathway for Indigenous and multicultural footballers who are typically under-represented and clubs incentivised with draft concessions.

In his draft year, Owens was tipped as a potential first-round draft pick after averaging 23.3 disposals, 5.7 marks and 3.7 inside 50s from his final three NAB League games. Owens played for the Sandringham Dragons in the NAB League and impressed in a game against Greater Western Victoria Rebels, collecting 25 disposals, seven clearances and five inside-50s. Owens was also a late call-up to Vic Metro's clash with Vic Country in July and picked up 29 disposals and a goal.

== AFL career ==
At the 2021 AFL draft on 25 November 2021, St Kilda matched a bid by Sydney with draft points for Owens and ultimately took him with pick 33 overall. Owens made his AFL debut in Round 1, 2022, against Collingwood, collecting six disposals and two tackles. He was dropped back to the VFL following his debut game.

Owens earned a recall to the senior team in Round 11 against North Melbourne and put in an impressive display with 14 disposals, 10 tackles and 2 goals; however, in the following game, against Brisbane, a concussion forced him to sit on the sidelines for several weeks. He returned to the side in Round 20 against Hawthorn and played the final four games of the season.

=== 2023 ===
Owens was selected in the senior team in Round 1 of the 2023 season and quickly established himself as a core member of newly appointed coach Ross Lyon's best 22 in the absence of regular key forwards Max King and Tim Membrey, playing predominantly forward with stints in the midfield and deputising in the ruck. Owens was nominated for the AFL Rising Star in Round 4 against Gold Coast Suns after a 27-disposal, 2-goal game. In Round 10, Owens was substituted out in the second quarter as the result of a concussion in which his head collided with teammate Anthony Caminiti's knee, and subsequently missed the following match under the concussion protocols. Owens was recalled for the next match in Round 13 after St Kilda's bye, playing every match from then on to qualify the Saints for the finals in 6th place and an elimination final, including 4 goals against West Coast Eagles. Throughout the backend of the season, Owens was considered to be one of three favourites for the 2023 AFL Rising Star alongside Harry Sheezel and Will Ashcroft, eventually finishing third with 33 votes behind Sheezel (winner, 54) and Ashcroft (second, 39), receiving maximum votes from Nathan Buckley and at least 2 votes from every judge on the panel. Owens capped off his season by finishing fourth in the Trevor Barker Award, receiving the Saints' Best Emerging Player award alongside teammate Nasiah Wanganeen-Milera, and being named in the 22 Under 22 team, also alongside Wanganeen-Milera.

Following a breakout year in 2023, Owens' role shifted at St Kilda. While matching his previous-best 23 appearances in 2023, his influence in 2024 was stifled by further responsibility as a second ruck. Following a contract extension to the end of 2029, Owens returned to some of his best form in 2025, kicking 25 goals before a late-season hamstring injury.

== Family and personal life ==
Owens was born to a Japanese mother, Maki, who is originally from Yokohama. He is the first cousin of American football punter Tory Taylor who plays for the Chicago Bears in the National Football League (NFL).

== Statistics ==
Updated to the end of round 22, 2026.

Legend
G	Goals	K	Kicks	D	Disposals	T	Tackles
B	Behinds	H	Handballs	M	Marks	H/O	Hit-outs

Season	Team	No.	Games	Totals								Averages (per game)								Votes
Season	Team	No.	Games	G	B	K	H	D	M	T	H/O	G	B	K	H	D	M	T	H/O	Votes
2022	St Kilda	24	7	3	2	40	34	74	17	29	3	0.4	0.3	5.7	4.9	10.6	2.4	4.1	0.4	0
2023	St Kilda	10	23	26	16	187	159	346	83	87	49	1.1	0.7	8.1	6.9	15.0	3.6	3.8	2.1	0
2024	St Kilda	10	23	20	14	161	122	283	74	62	12	0.9	0.6	7.0	5.3	12.3	3.2	2.7	0.5	0
2025	St Kilda	10	19	25	16	141	104	245	65	35	32	1.3	0.8	7.4	5.5	12.9	3.4	1.8	1.7	0
2026	St Kilda	10	18	22	21	122	115	237	62	37	20	1.2	1.2	6.8	6.4	13.2	3.4	2.1	1.1	0
Career			90	96	69	651	534	1185	301	250	116	1.1	0.8	7.2	5.9	13.2	3.3	2.8	1.3	0
