= Troy Ugle =

Australian rules footballer

Personal information
- Born: 18 April 1968 (age 58)
- Original team: Carey Park (SWFL)
- Height: 175 cm (5 ft 9 in)
- Weight: 78 kg (172 lb)

Playing career
Years	Club	Games (Goals)
1986-1994, 1996–1999	Swan Districts	162 (311)
1988–1993	West Coast Eagles	43 (43)
Total		205 (354)

Troy Ugle (born 18 April 1968) is a former Australian rules footballer.

== Playing career ==
Ugle began his senior football career with Carey Park in the South West Football League.

In 1986, he joined Swan Districts in the West Australian Football League, making his debut the following year. He won the Swan Medal for best and fairest player at the club in 1987.

During the 1986/1987 Northern Territory Football League season, Ugle played for Wanderers.

He was signed to the West Coast Eagles in 1988. He played 43 matches for the Eagles, kicking over 40 goals.

After being released by the Eagles, Ugle returned to Swan Districts, playing a further 73 matches over five years and was the leading goalkicker for the Swans between 1996 and 1998.

He was made a life member of the club by Swan Districts in 1999.
