= Bunbury Football Club =

Names
- Full name: Bunbury Football Club
- Former name: Bunbury Railways Football Club (1906-1956)
- Nickname: Bulldogs

Club details
- Founded: 1892
- Colours: Yellow and Black
- Competition: South West Football League
- President: Tom Busher
- Coach: Jamie Nani
- Ground: PC Payne Park
- Former ground: Bunbury Recreation Ground

Bunbury Football Club is a semi-professional Australian rules football club based in Bunbury, Western Australia. The club plays in the South West Football League.

== History ==
The Bunbury Football Club was established in 1892 and was the first Australian rules football club in the Bunbury region. The Bunbury club merged with the Railways Football Club in 1906 to become the Bunbury Railways Football Club, until 1956 when the "Railways" name was omitted. The club's original home ground was the Bunbury Recreation Ground adjacent to Bunbury Back Beach. In 1973 the club relocated to PC Payne Park where clubrooms were established to cater for 200 people. In 1983 extensions incorporated a gymnasium, boardroom, and upstairs function area. In 2019 the club developed plans to improve facilities at PC Payne Park.

As of the 2021 season the club fields League, Women's, Reserves and Colts teams in the South West Football League, a Netball team and a range of junior teams including Auskick.

== Club records ==
- Total League Premierships: 10 (1956, 1958, 1961, 1962, 1970, 1982, 1983, 2001, 2017, 2020)

== Notable players ==
- Phil Narkle
- Keith Narkle
- Kyle Reimers
- Neville Jetta
- Lewis Jetta
- Connor Blakely
