= Luke Pedlar =

Australian rules footballer

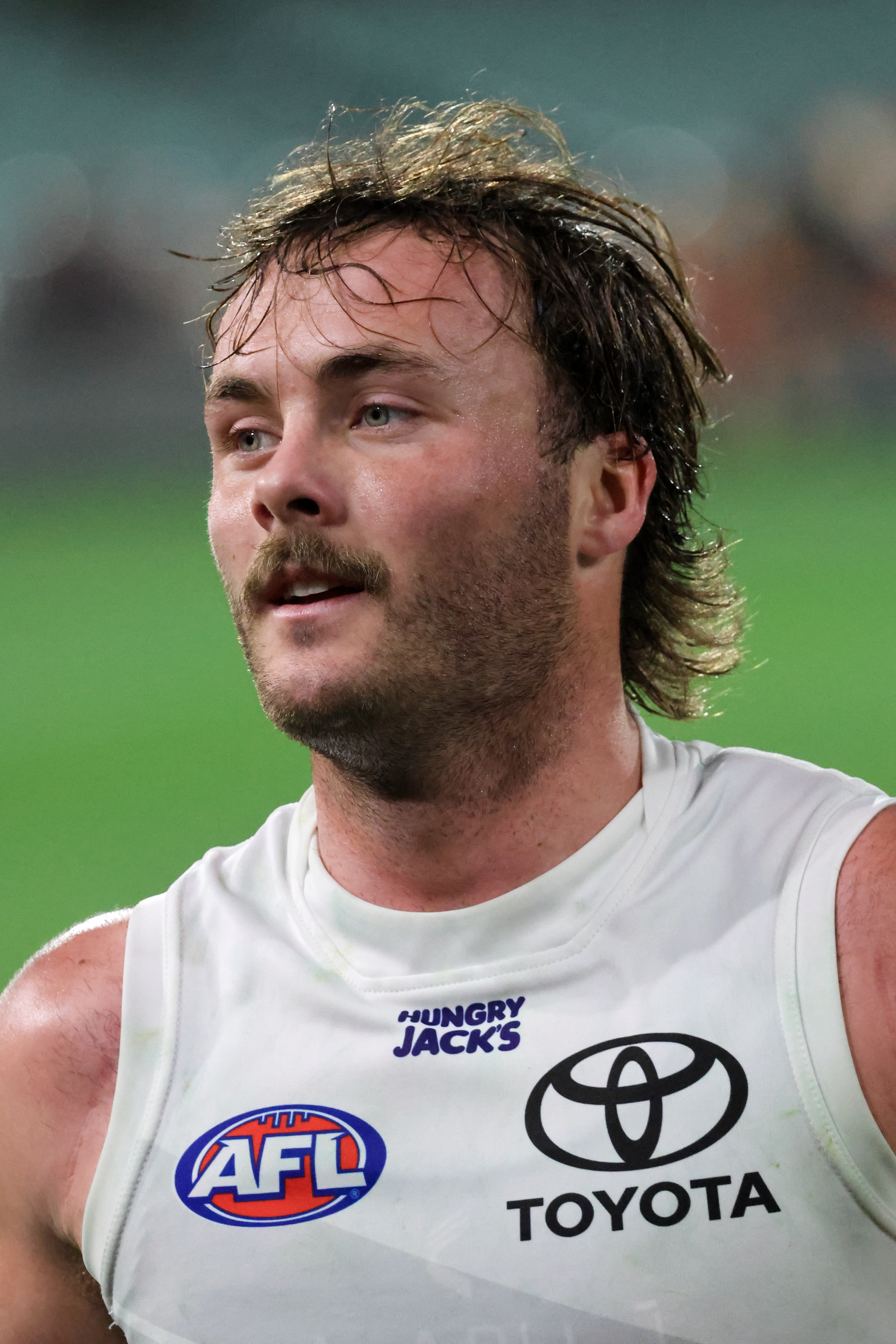
- Pedlar in 2026

Personal information
- Full name: Luke Matthew Pedlar
- Born: 17 May 2002 (age 24); Mount Gambier, South Australia
- Original team: Glenelg (SANFL)
- Draft: No. 11, 2020 AFL draft
- Debut: Round 16, 2021, Adelaide vs. Brisbane Lions, at Adelaide Oval
- Height: 183 cm (6 ft 0 in)
- Weight: 84 kg (185 lb)
- Position: Forward

Club information
- Current club: Port Adelaide

Playing career^{1}
Years	Club	Games (Goals)
2021–2026	Adelaide	49 (48)
2027–	Port Adelaide	0 (0)
- ^{1} Playing statistics correct to the end of 2026.

Career highlights
- Rising Star nominee: 2023; 22under22 team 44-man squad: 2023

Luke Matthew Pedlar (born 17 May 2002) is a professional Australian rules footballer playing for Port Adelaide in the Australian Football League (AFL).

== Early career ==
Luke Pedlar was born in Mt Gambier and his family then moved to Kingston when he was 6. At the age of 16 he moved to Adelaide and boarded at Prince Alfred College for Year 11 and 12. He was invited to Glenelg and played in the colts. Prior he attended Kingston Community School and played local football for the Kingston Saints in the Kowree-Naracoorte-Tatiara Football League.

== AFL career ==
=== Adelaide (2021–present) ===
Pedlar was recruited with pick No.11 in 2020 AFL draft. He made his debut for the Crows against the Brisbane Lions in round 16, 2021. An ankle injury ended Pedlar's season after two games. He also had a left shoulder reconstruction during the off-season. In 2022, he had to cope with the rehab on his shoulder and osteitis pubis in his groins.

2023 was a career-best year for Pedlar, who moved from the midfield to the forward line. As a result, he kicked 25 goals from 21 games. He received a nomination for the 2023 Rising Star award after kicking two goals against North Melbourne in round 16.

Pedlar was plagued by injury throughout his first few years at AFL level. In 2026, he was stretchered off the field after a collison with Fremantle's Andrew Brayshaw in round four, and suffered two hamstring injuries in the second half of the season. He did not play again following the round 14 win over the Western Bulldogs, only managing 10 games for the year.

Following the conclusion of the 2026 AFL season, Pedlar request a trade to the Crows' cross-town rivals, Port Adelaide.

== Statistics ==
Updated to the end of the 2026 season.

Legend
G	Goals	K	Kicks	D	Disposals	T	Tackles
B	Behinds	H	Handballs	M	Marks

Season	Team	No.	Games	Totals							Averages (per game)							Votes
Season	Team	No.	Games	G	B	K	H	D	M	T	G	B	K	H	D	M	T	Votes
2021	Adelaide	10	2	0	0	14	5	19	4	1	0.0	0.0	7.0	2.5	9.5	2.0	0.5	0
2022	Adelaide	10	3	1	1	2	3	5	0	2	0.3	0.3	0.7	1.0	1.7	0.0	0.7	0
2023	Adelaide	10	21	25	15	173	76	249	72	55	1.2	0.7	8.2	3.6	11.9	3.4	2.6	0
2024	Adelaide	10	4	1	2	20	3	23	7	4	0.3	0.5	5.0	0.8	5.8	1.8	1.0	0
2025	Adelaide	10	9	13	2	46	17	63	20	27	1.4	0.2	5.1	1.9	7.0	2.2	3.0	0
2026	Adelaide	10	10	8	6	59	36	95	29	21	0.8	0.6	5.9	3.6	9.5	2.9	2.1	0
Career			49	48	26	314	140	454	132	110	1.0	0.5	6.4	2.9	9.3	2.7	2.2	0
