= Jai Culley =

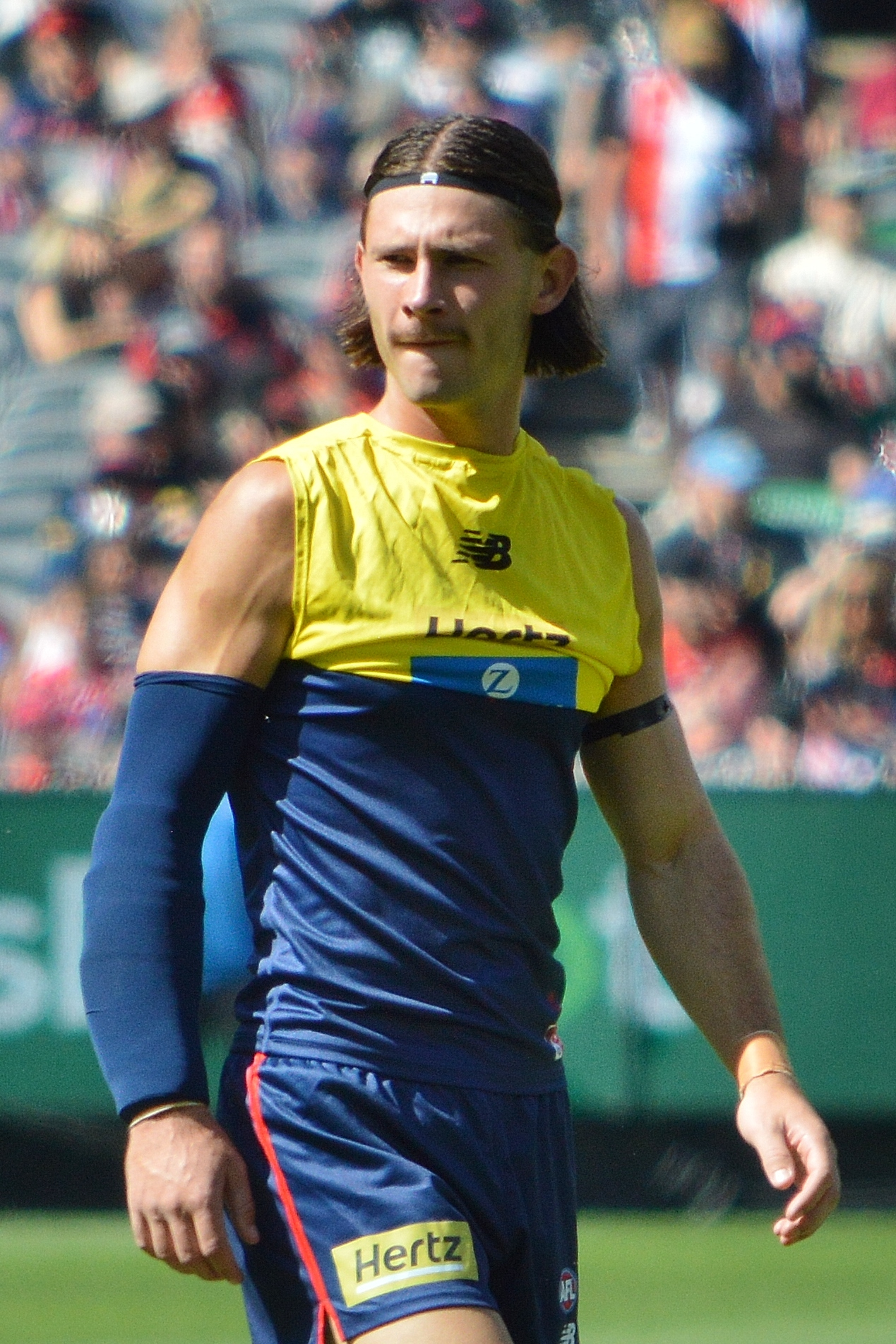
- Culley with Melbourne in March 2026

Personal information
- Born: 24 February 2003 (age 23)
- Original team: Langwarrin JFC/Dandenong Stingrays
- Draft: No. 1, 2022 mid-season rookie draft
- Debut: 17 July 2022, West Coast vs. Hawthorn, at MCG
- Height: 194 cm (6 ft 4 in)
- Position: Midfielder/Forward

Club information
- Current club: Melbourne
- Number: 13

Playing career^{1}
| Years | Club | Games (Goals) |
| 2022–2024 | West Coast | 12 (7) |
| 2025– | Melbourne | 11 (4) |
| Total | | 23 (11) |
- ^{1} Playing statistics correct to the end of round 22, 2026.

Career highlights
- AFL Rising Star nominee: 2023

Jai Culley (born 24 February 2003) is a professional Australian rules footballer who plays for Melbourne in the Australian Football League (AFL). Culley previously played for the West Coast Eagles.

== AFL career ==
=== West Coast ===
Culley was selected with pick 1 of the 2022 mid-season rookie draft. He made his debut against Hawthorn in round 18 of the 2022 AFL season. Culley played 4 games in his debut season.

In round 6 of the 2023 AFL season Culley kicked 4 goals and had 10 disposals, earning him a nomination for the 2023 AFL Rising Star Award. Two weeks later in round 8 against the Richmond Tigers, Culley ruptured his ACL and would not play for the remainder of the season.

At the conclusion of the 2024 season Culley was delisted by the Eagles.

=== Melbourne ===
Culley signed with the Casey Demons following his delisting in an attempt to return to an AFL list. On 24 February 2025, Culley was signed by the Melbourne Football Club in the Supplemental Selection Period (SSP) for the 2025 AFL season, which had closed three days prior but was re-opened to allow Melbourne to find a replacement for Andy Moniz-Wakefield, who had suffered an ACL injury in a practice match over the weekend. He made his debut for Melbourne in round 21 of the 2025 AFL season. At the end of the season, Culley signed a one-year contract extension to the end of 2026.

In April 2026, having played every game for the Demons up to that point in the season, Culley signed a two-year contract extension to the end of 2028. In round 7 of the 2026 AFL season, Culley ruptured his ACL, ruling him out for the rest of the season.

== Statistics ==
Updated to the end of round 22, 2026.

Legend
| G | Goals | K | Kicks | D | Disposals | T | Tackles |
| B | Behinds | H | Handballs | M | Marks |

| Season | Team | No. | Games | Totals | | | | | | | Averages (per game) | | | | | | | Votes |
| Season | Team | No. | Games | G | B | K | H | D | M | T | G | B | K | H | D | M | T | Votes |
|---|---|---|---|---|---|---|---|---|---|---|---|---|---|---|---|---|---|---|
| 2022 | West Coast | 49 | 4 | 1 | 1 | 28 | 25 | 53 | 8 | 30 | 0.3 | 0.3 | 7.0 | 6.3 | 13.3 | 2.0 | 7.5 | 0 |
| 2023 | West Coast | 49 | 5 | 5 | 2 | 14 | 28 | 42 | 8 | 15 | 1.0 | 0.4 | 2.8 | 5.6 | 8.4 | 1.6 | 3.0 | 0 |
| 2024 | West Coast | 49 | 3 | 1 | 1 | 18 | 10 | 28 | 5 | 7 | 0.3 | 0.3 | 6.0 | 3.3 | 9.3 | 1.7 | 2.3 | 0 |
| 2025 | Melbourne | 46 | 4 | 3 | 0 | 25 | 29 | 54 | 14 | 11 | 0.8 | 0.0 | 6.3 | 7.3 | 13.5 | 3.5 | 2.8 | 0 |
| 2026 | Melbourne | 13 | 7 | 1 | 3 | 45 | 41 | 86 | 21 | 15 | 0.1 | 0.4 | 6.4 | 5.9 | 12.3 | 3.0 | 2.1 | 0 |
| Career | | | 23 | 11 | 7 | 130 | 133 | 263 | 56 | 78 | 0.5 | 0.3 | 5.7 | 5.8 | 11.4 | 2.4 | 3.4 | 0 |
