= Jacob van Rooyen =

Australian rules footballer

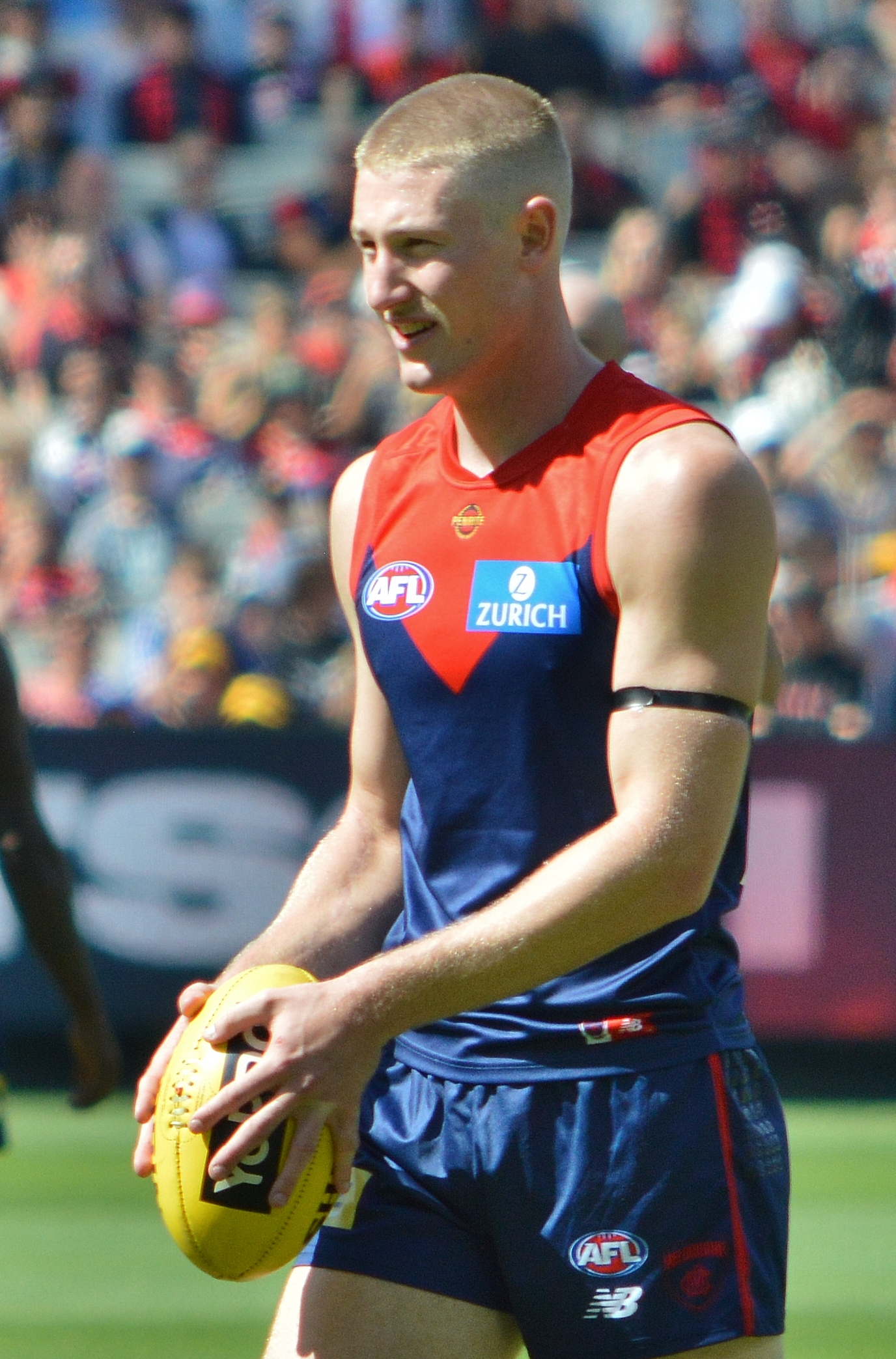
- van Rooyen in March 2026

Personal information
- Full name: Jacob van Rooyen
- Born: 16 April 2003 (age 23)
- Original team: Claremont (WAFL)
- Draft: No. 19, 2021 national draft
- Debut: Round 3, 2023, Melbourne vs. Sydney, at MCG
- Height: 193 cm (6 ft 4 in)
- Weight: 96 kg (212 lb)
- Position: Forward

Club information
- Current club: Melbourne
- Number: 2

Playing career^{1}
Years	Club	Games (Goals)
2022–	Melbourne	79 (116)
- ^{1} Playing statistics correct to the end of round 23, 2026.

Career highlights
- Melbourne leading goalkicker: 2026; Harold Ball Memorial Trophy: 2023; AFL Rising Star nominee: 2023; VFL premiership player: 2022

Jacob van Rooyen (born 16 April 2003) is a professional Australian rules footballer playing for the Melbourne Football Club in the Australian Football League (AFL). He previously played for Claremont in the West Australian Football League (WAFL). He was drafted by Melbourne with their first selection and nineteenth overall in the 2021 national draft. After spending the entire 2022 season playing for Casey in the Victorian Football League, he made his debut in the 50-point win against Sydney at the Melbourne Cricket Ground in the third round of the 2023 season, kicking three goals and making six tackles.

During the Round 8 game against Gold Coast, van Rooyen was charged with striking and suspended for two weeks when an attempted spoil on Charlie Ballard resulted in his arm hitting his opponent's head. The suspension was overturned upon appeal, and van Rooyen was able to play the following week.

In Round 12, he was awarded the weekly Rising Star nomination after his tenth consecutive game, having scored at least one goal in each game.

Van Rooyen's 2023 season is known for his accuracy, having the highest goal-to-behind percentage of any player in the league to have 30 or more scoring shots, scoring 28 goals and 9 behinds and resulting in an accuracy percentage of 75.7%.

After Melbourne’s Qualifying Final in 2023 van Rooyen received a one match ban due to a high bump on Collingwood player Daniel McStay. This caused van Rooyen to miss the semi final match against Carlton which Melbourne lost in the dying seconds, therefore ending Melbourne’s season.

== Statistics ==
Updated to the end of round 22, 2026.

Legend
G	Goals	K	Kicks	D	Disposals	T	Tackles
B	Behinds	H	Handballs	M	Marks

Season	Team	No.	Games	Totals							Averages (per game)							Votes
Season	Team	No.	Games	G	B	K	H	D	M	T	G	B	K	H	D	M	T	Votes
2022	Melbourne	21	0	—	—	—	—	—	—	—	—	—	—	—	—	—	—	0
2023	Melbourne	2	20	28	9	90	84	174	62	43	1.4	0.4	4.5	4.2	8.7	3.1	2.2	2
2024	Melbourne	2	21	30	16	127	88	215	81	38	1.4	0.8	6.0	4.2	10.2	3.9	1.8	1
2025	Melbourne	2	16	16	10	84	81	165	46	42	1.0	0.6	5.3	5.1	10.3	2.9	2.6	0
2026	Melbourne	2	22	42	21	154	108	249	104	28	1.9	0.9	7.0	4.9	11.9	4.7	1.3	10
Career			79	116	56	455	361	816	293	151	1.5	0.7	5.7	4.5	10.3	3.7	1.9	13
