= List of Fremantle Football Club leading goalkickers =

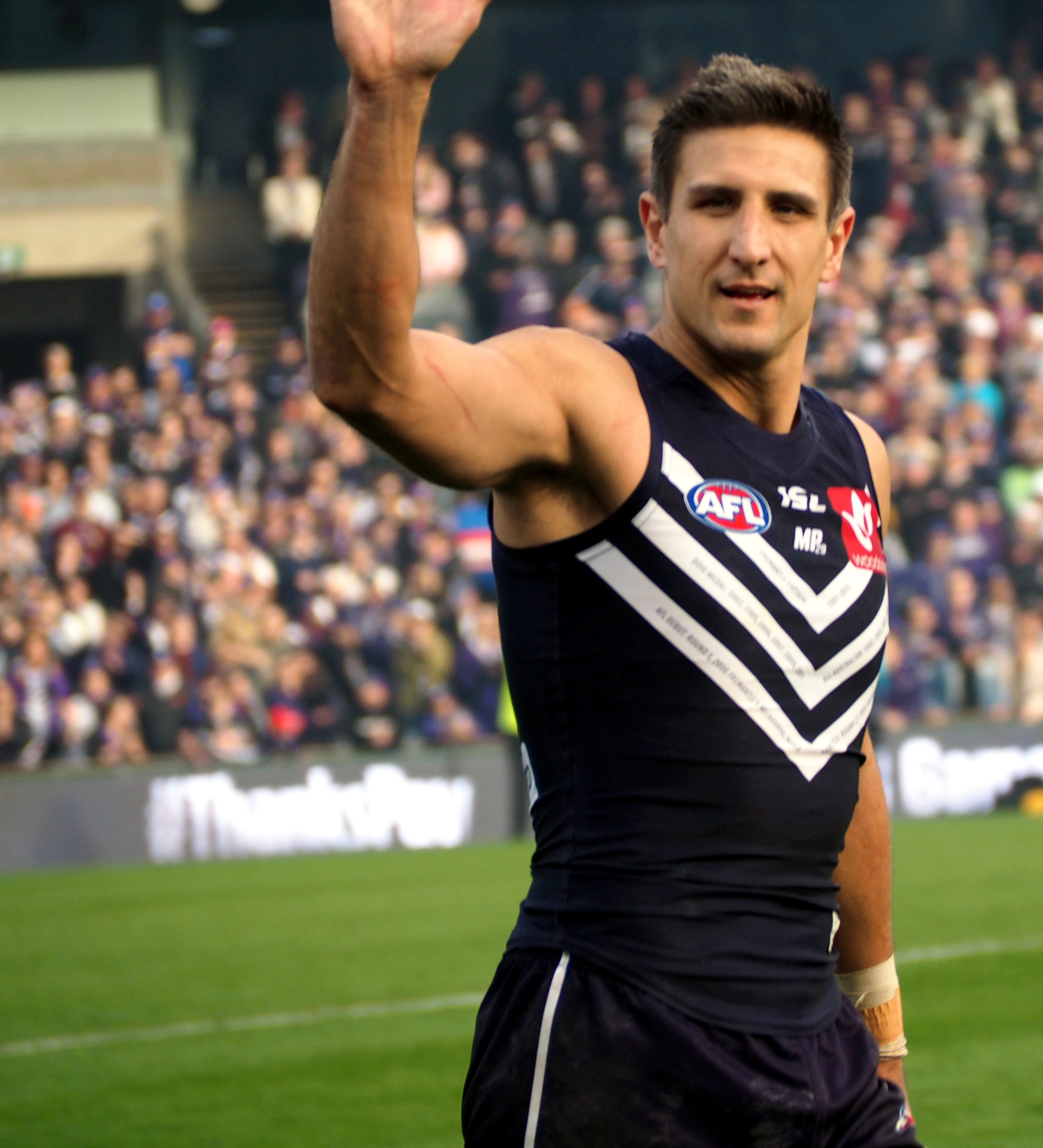
Matthew Pavlich was Fremantle's leading goalkicker a record eight times.

The following is a list of Fremantle Football Club leading goalkickers in each season of the Australian Football League (AFL) and AFL Women's. Matthew Pavlich holds the record with the most goals kicked in a season for Fremantle and the record for most occasions as the club's leading goalkicker. He also holds the record for most career goals for the club. So far, there has not been a player for Fremantle that has won the Coleman Medal.

== AFL ==
^	Denotes current player
†	Team played finals (which count for the tally)

Season	Player(s)	Total
1995	Peter Mann	33
1996	Kingsley Hunter	33
1997	Kingsley Hunter (2)	32
1998	Clive Waterhouse	30
1999	Tony Modra	71
2000	Clive Waterhouse (2)	53
2001	Matthew Pavlich	28
2001	Justin Longmuir	28
2002	Trent Croad	42
2003	Paul Medhurst	50†
2004	Paul Medhurst (2)	41
2005	Matthew Pavlich (2)	61
2006	Matthew Pavlich (3)	71†
2007	Matthew Pavlich (4)	72
2008	Matthew Pavlich (5)	67
2009	Matthew Pavlich (6)	28
2010	Matthew Pavlich (7)	61†
2011	Kepler Bradley	25
2011	Chris Mayne	25
2012	Matthew Pavlich (8)	69†
2013	Michael Walters	46†
2014	Hayden Ballantyne	49†
2015	Michael Walters (2)	44†
2016	Michael Walters (3)	36
2017	Cam McCarthy	25
2018	Michael Walters (4)	22
2019	Michael Walters (5)	40
2020	Matt Taberner	29
2021	Matt Taberner (2)	37
2022	Rory Lobb	36†
2023	Jye Amiss^	41
2024	Josh Treacy^	45
2025	Josh Treacy^ (2)	44†
2026	Jye Amiss^ (2)	64†

=== Multiple winners ===
Player	Wins	Seasons
Matthew Pavlich	8	2001, 2005, 2006, 2007, 2008, 2009, 2010, 2012
Michael Walters	5	2013, 2015, 2016, 2018, 2019
Kingsley Hunter	2	1996, 1997
Clive Waterhouse	2	1998, 2000
Paul Medhurst	2	2003, 2004
Matt Taberner	2	2020, 2021
Josh Treacy^	2	2024, 2025
Jye Amiss^	2	2023, 2026

=== Leading career goalkickers ===
Player	goals	Average
Matthew Pavlich	700	1.98
Michael Walters	365	1.57
Hayden Ballantyne	254	1.49
Jeff Farmer	224	1.71
Chris Mayne	196	1.14
Clive Waterhouse	178	1.68
Nat Fyfe	178	0.73
Jye Amiss^	175	1.82
Josh Treacy^	174	1.66
Matt Taberner	173	1.39
Paul Medhurst	166	1.68
Justin Longmuir	166	1.19

=== Most goals in a game ===
Goals	Player	Opponent	Round	Year	Venue
10.2	Tony Modra	Melbourne	10	1999	MCG
9.1	Paul Medhurst	Brisbane	9	2004	Subiaco
9.0	Matthew Pavlich	Carlton	16	2005	MCG
8.5	John Hutton	Sydney	6	1995	WACA
8.2	Matthew Pavlich	West Coast	19	2012	Subiaco
8.2	Matthew Pavlich	North Melbourne	12	2008	Subiaco
8.1	Matthew Pavlich	Adelaide	14	2005	Football Park

== AFL Women's ==
^	Denotes current player
†	Team played finals (which count for the tally)

Season	Player(s)	Total
2017	Kara Antonio	4
2017	Ashley Sharp	4
2018	Amy Lavell	6
2019	Gemma Houghton	9†
2020	Sabreena Duffy	12†
2021	Gemma Houghton (2)	15†
2022 (S6)	Hayley Miller^	10†
2022 (S6)	Ebony Antonio	10†
2022 (S7)	Aine Tighe^	11
2023	Aine Tighe^ (2)	9
2024	Aisling McCarthy^	8†
2025	Hayley Miller^ (2)	11
2026	Hayley Miller^ (3)	13

=== Leading career goalkickers ===
Player	goals	Average
Hayley Miller^	48	0.46
Gemma Houghton	40	0.87
Gabby O'Sullivan^	39	0.40
Ebony Antonio	38	0.54
Sabreena Duffy	30	1.20
Aine Tighe^	29	0.85

== See also ==
- VFL/AFL goalkicking records
- Fremantle Football Club honour roll
