= Donnybrook Football Club =

Donnybrook

Names
- Full name: Donnybrook Football Club
- Nickname(s): Dons

Club details
- Founded: 1897
- Colours: Blue White
- Competition: South West Football League
- Premierships: 5 (1977, 1998, 1999, 2000, 2018
- Ground(s): VC Mitchell Park, Donnybrook W.A.

The Donnybrook Football Club is an Australian rules football club which competes in the South West Football League in the South West corner of Western Australia.

It is based in the Western Australian town of Donnybrook.

== History ==
The Donnybrook Football Club origins date back to 1897 when the first association was formed in the Bunbury Area. Donnybrook was a founding club. Interest in the association soon fizzled as Donnybrook and the association wound up.

Donnybrook had another go with the Bunbury FA in 1914 only to be stopped by The Great War, then again in the 1920s. When Donnybrook wasn't involved with Bunbury Association it would be in a local competition The local association always had two Donnybrook-based teams. They would play against local clubs; Argyle, Balingup, Boyanup, Capel, Dardanup, East Kirup, Kirup, Lowden, Nannup, Noggerup, and other small localities over the early years.

The idea of creating larger league was discussed early in 1951. The idea that three clubs from the Collie Football Association and the three clubs from the Bunbury Football association would invigorate public interest in the South West region on the state. Talks continued into 1952 and it was finally agree to trial a competition with all the two associations clubs for a two-year period. The associations administrations would remain separate. Sensing opportunity, Donnybrook left their local competition to become the seventh club.

In 1953 the Bunbury-Collie League was founded with seven teams. South Bunbury, Bunbury Railways, Bunbury Pastimes, Mines Rovers, Collie Railways, Centrals and Donnybrook. The public response was evident, interest was up, attendances to games were up and the general standard of play was an obvious improvement.

== Premierships ==
- 1977, 1998, 1999, 2000, 2018

== Notable players ==
- Bill Gnaden
- Ben Howlett
- Peter Worsfold
