= Graham House (cricketer) =

Australian cricketer

Personal information
- Full name: Graham Warwick Charles House
- Born: 4 September 1950 (age 76); Busselton, Western Australia
- Batting: Right-handed
- Bowling: Right-arm leg-break
- Role: All-rounder

Domestic team information
- Years: Team
- 1972/73–1973/74: Western Australia
- 1974/75: South Australia

Career statistics
Competition	First-class
Matches	6
Runs scored	100
Batting average	14.28
100s/50s	0/1
Top score	70*
Balls bowled	586
Wickets	7
Bowling average	40.85
5 wickets in innings	0
10 wickets in match	0
Best bowling	2/5
Catches/stumpings	3/–
- Source: CricketArchive, 12 January 2013

Graham Warwick Charles House (born 4 September 1950) is a former Australian cricketer who played domestically for both Western Australia and South Australia during the early 1970s. Born in Busselton, a mid-sized town in the south-west region of Western Australia, House was a talented schoolboy cricketer, captaining a representative Australian Schools team on a tour to India during the 1966–67 season. He made his debut at state level during the 1972–73 season, having previously also played for a Western Australia Country team against the touring English cricket team. House made his first-class debut in that season's Sheffield Shield, in a match against Victoria at the WACA Ground. A leg-spinner and competent lower-order batsman, he and Paul Nicholls worked in tandem as Western Australia's spinners during the match. House took only one wicket in the match (that of Graham Yallop in Victoria's second innings), but in Western Australia's second innings he scored 70 not out, his highest first-class score and only half-century. He and Jim Hubble put on an unbeaten partnership of 87 runs in an unbeaten eighth wicket partnership to secure victory by three wickets.

House played a further three matches for Western Australia (two during the rest of the 1972–73 season and one the following season), but Bob Paulsen was generally the state's first-choice spinner, and he transferred to South Australia for the following season. Though hoping to gain more regular selection, he only played twice at first-class level for South Australia—once against Queensland and once against England on its 1974–75 tour of Australia. Returning to Busselton, House played Australian rules football in the local South West Football League (SWFL) for Busselton, taking out the club's best and fairest award in 1976 and was captain of the club when it won the grand final in 1978. After retiring from playing, House served in various coaching and administrative roles in the Northern Territory, including head coach of the Northern Territory Institute of Sport's cricket program and chairman of selectors of Northern Territory Cricket.
