= Jim Hubble =

Australian cricketer (1942–2023)

Personal information
- Full name: James Merrick Hubble
- Born: 12 August 1942; Beaconsfield, Perth, Western Australia
- Died: 21 May 2023 (aged 80); Subiaco, Perth, Western Australia
- Batting: Left-handed
- Bowling: Left-arm fast-medium

Domestic team information
- Years: Team
- 1964/65–1974/75: Western Australia

Career statistics
Competition	First-class	List A
Matches	24	2
Runs scored	279	13
Batting average	16.41	–
100s/50s	0/1	0/0
Top score	54	13*
Balls bowled	4,114	100
Wickets	69	3
Bowling average	28.71	23.33
5 wickets in innings	2	0
10 wickets in match	1	–
Best bowling	7/49	3/27
Catches/stumpings	10/–	0/–
- Source: CricketArchive, 6 August 2014

James Merrick Hubble (12 August 1942 – 21 May 2023) was an Australian cricketer who played Sheffield Shield cricket for Western Australia. He toured South Africa with the Australian team in 1966–67 but did not play Test cricket.

== Cricket career ==
Hubble was born in Perth and attended Perth Modern School from 1955 to 1959. A left-arm opening bowler, he made his first-class debut for Western Australia in 1964–65, taking four wickets in two matches. He played four matches in 1965–66, partnering Graham McKenzie with the new ball and taking 17 wickets at an average of 28.00. He was selected for the tour to South Africa ahead of more experienced pace bowlers such as Alan Connolly and Peter Allan.

In South Africa, Hubble took 5 for 74 against Eastern Province in his second match of the tour but was then hampered by a back injury, and finished the tour with 18 wickets in eight first-class matches at 24.44. After struggling with an ankle injury during two matches in 1967–68, he retired.

Hubble gradually recovered fitness and form in Perth club cricket and returned to the state side for the last three matches of the 1972–73 season. In the first match he scored 33 not out in the second innings in an unbroken eighth-wicket partnership of 87 with Graham House, to take Western Australia to victory over Victoria. In the second match, against Queensland, he took 3 for 35 and 7 for 49 as well as making 46 not out to help Western Australia to another victory, and in the last match he took five wickets in an innings victory over South Australia that gave Western Australia the Sheffield Shield. In three matches he scored 105 runs at 105.00 and took 17 wickets at 17.41.

He was unable to reproduce that success in subsequent seasons, and played only three matches in 1973–74, with one last match in 1974–75.

Hubble died on 21 May 2023, aged 80.
