= Seamus Mitchell =

Australian rules footballer (born 2002)

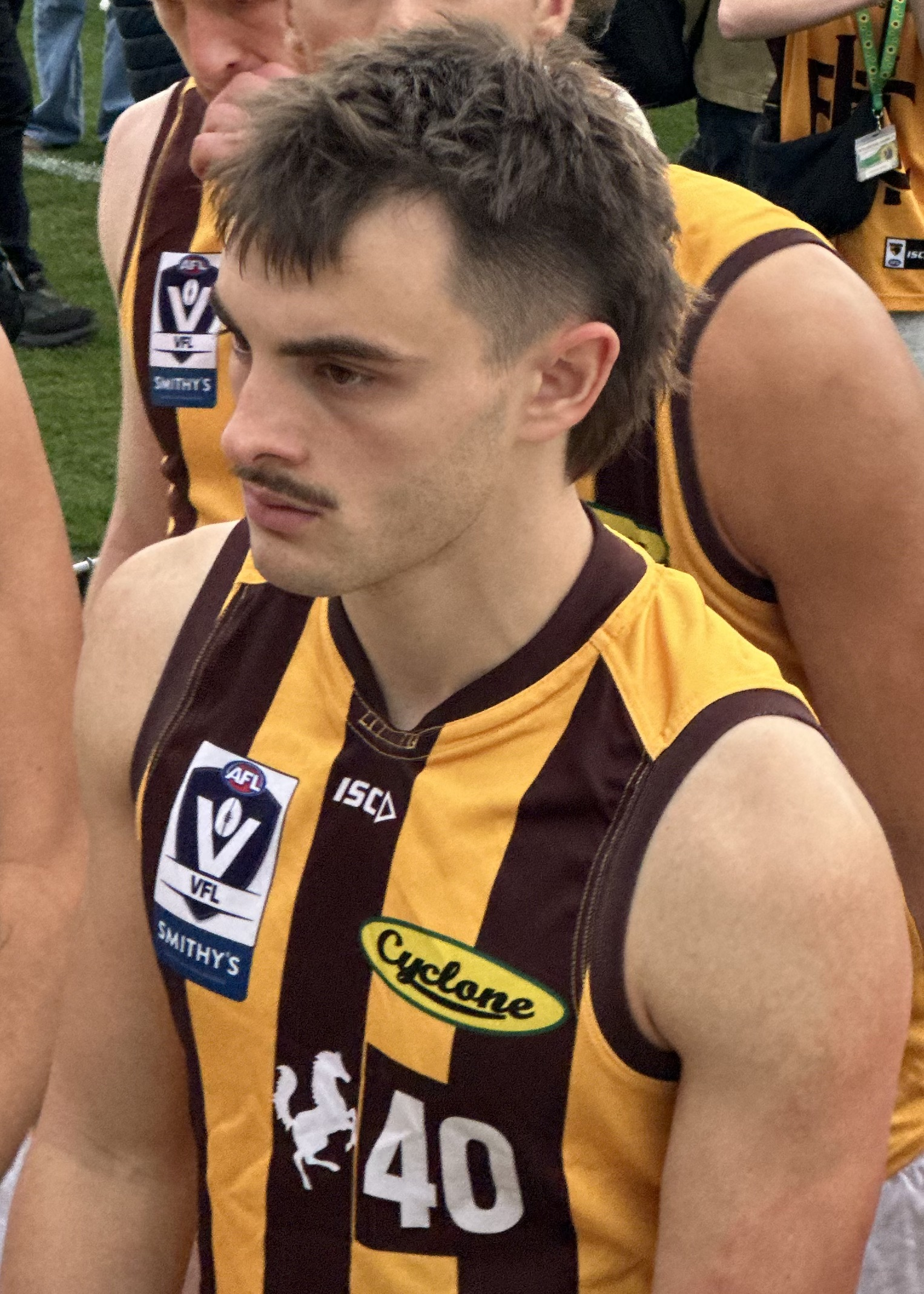
- Mitchell in September 2025

Personal information
- Full name: Seamus Mitchell
- Born: 3 July 2002 (age 24)
- Original teams: Robinvale, Bendigo Pioneers
- Draft: No. 29, 2020 national draft
- Debut: Round 5, 2023, Hawthorn vs. Greater Western Sydney, at Norwood Oval, Adelaide
- Height: 181 cm (5 ft 11 in)
- Weight: 80 kg (176 lb)
- Position: General Defender

Playing career
Years	Club	Games (Goals)
2021–2025	Hawthorn	28 (0)

Seamus Mitchell (born 3 July 2002) is a former professional Australian rules footballer who played for the Hawthorn Football Club in the Australian Football League (AFL).

== Early career ==
Mitchell grew up at Robinvale, Victoria, He was later invited to play with the Bendigo Pioneers, the area's state under 18 side the competes in the NAB cup.

== AFL career ==
Mitchell was Hawthorn second draft pick of the 2020 AFL draft, the club used pick 29. He arrived at the club with an injury cloud. He had had an operation on his ankle and it delayed his development as he had no pre-season training. He managed to get fit in time to play for Box Hill Hawks in round 16 of the 2021 season. His 2022 season was over early with ankle and shoulder surgeries. He was delisted at the end of 2022 but was given a lifeline by being rookied with pick 6 of the rookie draft. He made his debut in round 5, 2023 against Greater Western Sydney at Norwood Oval.

Twelve weeks later he received a rising star nomination after a spate of impressive performances out of the backline.

Mitchell was delisted by Hawthorn at the end of the 2025 AFL season, after 28 matches over 5 seasons at the club.

== Statistics ==
Legend
G	Goals	K	Kicks	D	Disposals	T	Tackles
B	Behinds	H	Handballs	M	Marks

Season	Team	No.	Games	Totals							Averages (per game)							Votes
Season	Team	No.	Games	G	B	K	H	D	M	T	G	B	K	H	D	M	T	Votes
2021	Hawthorn	40	0	—	—	—	—	—	—	—	—	—	—	—	—	—	—	0
2022	Hawthorn	40	0	—	—	—	—	—	—	—	—	—	—	—	—	—	—	0
2023	Hawthorn	40	14	0	1	131	102	233	66	25	0.0	0.1	9.4	7.3	16.6	4.7	1.8	0
2024	Hawthorn	40	10	0	0	48	38	86	26	18	0.0	0.0	4.8	3.8	8.6	2.6	1.8	0
2025	Hawthorn	40	4	0	0	14	11	25	8	9	0.0	0.0	3.5	2.8	6.3	2.0	2.3	0
Career			28	0	1	193	151	344	100	52	0.0	0.0	6.9	5.4	12.3	3.6	1.9	0

== Honours and achievements ==
Team

- McClelland Trophy (Hawthorn): 2024

Individual

- AFL Rising Star nominee: 2023
