= Josh Weddle =

Australian rules footballer (born 2004)

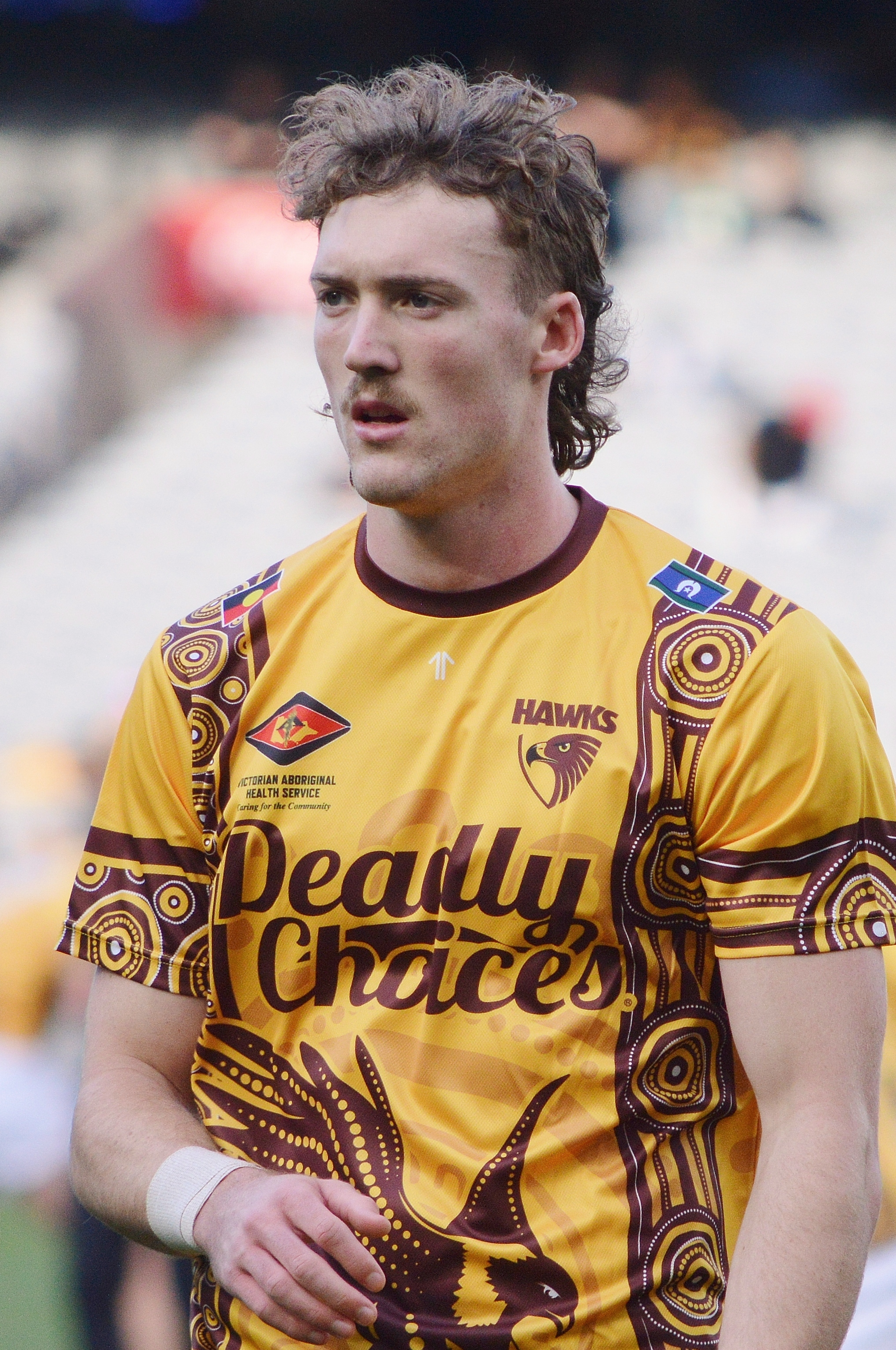
- Weddle in May 2026

Personal information
- Full name: Joshua Weddle
- Born: 25 May 2004 (age 22)
- Original team: Oakleigh Chargers (Talent League)
- Draft: No. 18, 2022 national draft, Hawthorn
- Debut: Round 7, 2023, Hawthorn vs. Western Bulldogs, at Docklands Stadium
- Height: 191 cm (6 ft 3 in)
- Weight: 92 kg (203 lb)
- Position: Utility

Club information
- Current club: Hawthorn
- Number: 23

Playing career^{1}
Years	Club	Games (Goals)
2023–	Hawthorn	82 (30)
- ^{1} Playing statistics correct to the end of 2026.

Career highlights
- 3× 22under22 team: 2024, 2025, 2026

Joshua Weddle (born 25 May 2004) is an Australian rules footballer who plays for the Hawthorn Football Club in the Australian Football League (AFL).

== Early career ==
Weddle grew up in Templestowe and learned his football craft at Templestowe Dockers in the Yarra Junior Football League, before transferring to St Marys Greensborough Junior Football Club and then being selected for the Oakleigh Chargers. He transferred to Carey Baptist Grammar School for year 12 (after previously attending Eltham High School), playing for both Carey and Oakleigh during his draft year in 2022. He played all four National Championship games for Vic Metro, where it saw him named in the All Australian side at full back.

Growing up, he played representative basketball for the Eltham Wildcats.

== AFL career ==
He was the eighteenth selection in the 2022 AFL draft by Hawthorn. He has been described as a player with strong aerial ability and sound defensive craft.

After some strong performances for Hawthorn's affiliated reserves club Box Hill Hawks, Weddle made his debut against Western Bulldogs at Docklands Stadium in round 7, 2023.

After his fourth game, Weddle was awarded a Rising Star nomination for his effort in the game against West Coast in Tasmania. After his debut season, Weddle inherited the famous number 23 guernsey of Hawthorn, previously worn by club legends such as Lance Franklin and Dermott Brereton. He received consecutive selections in the honorary 22 Under 22 team in 2024 and 2025.

Following the 2025 AFL season, rumours circulated that Essendon had offered a seven-year contract worth $10 million to Weddle. The discussion of a move to a rival club was put to rest in February of 2026 when he signed a four-year contract to stay with the Hawks. During the 2026 season, Weddle was given a three-match ban after engaging in rough conduct with Gold Coast's Daniel Rioli.

== Statistics ==
Updated to the end of 2026.

Legend
G	Goals	K	Kicks	D	Disposals	T	Tackles
B	Behinds	H	Handballs	M	Marks	H/O	Hit-outs

Season	Team	No.	Games	Totals								Averages (per game)								Votes
Season	Team	No.	Games	G	B	K	H	D	M	T	H/O	G	B	K	H	D	M	T	H/O	Votes
2023	Hawthorn	37	17	4	0	135	159	294	87	23	0	0.2	0.0	7.9	9.4	17.3	5.1	1.4	0.0	1
2024	Hawthorn	23	25	10	8	199	155	354	99	44	24	0.4	0.3	8.0	6.2	14.2	4.0	1.8	1.0	3
2025	Hawthorn	23	18	9	9	163	127	290	89	36	40	0.5	0.5	9.1	7.1	16.1	4.9	2.0	2.2	4
2026	Hawthorn	23	21	7	15	188	148	336	106	56	8	0.3	0.7	8.6	6.7	15.3	4.8	2.6	0.4	0
Career			82	30	32	685	589	1274	381	159	72	0.4	0.4	8.4	7.2	15.5	4.7	1.9	0.9	8

== Honours and achievements ==
Team

- McClelland Trophy (Hawthorn): 2024

Individual

- 3× 22under22 team: 2024, 2025, 2026
- AFL Rising Star nominee: 2023
