= Cam McCarthy =

Australian rules footballer (1995–2024)

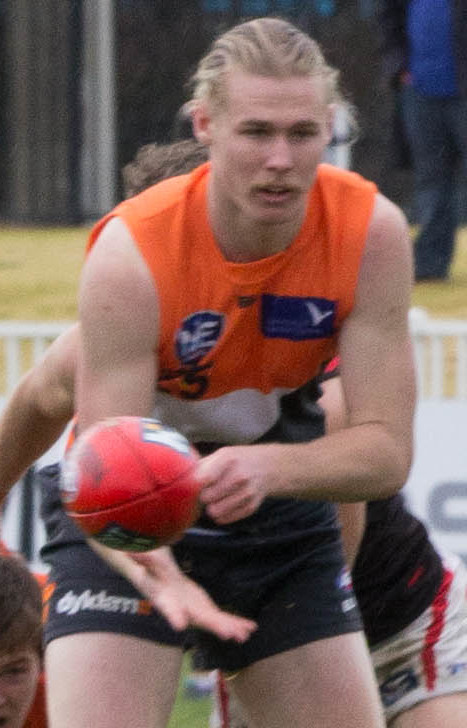
- McCarthy playing in 2015

Personal information
- Full name: Cameron Alex McCarthy
- Nickname: Dardy McCrafty
- Born: 1 April 1995; Western Australia
- Died: 9 May 2024 (aged 29); Lake Coogee, Western Australia
- Original team: South Fremantle (WAFL)
- Draft: No. 14, 2013 national draft
- Height: 192 cm (6 ft 4 in)
- Weight: 92 kg (203 lb)
- Position: Forward

Playing career^{1}
Years	Club	Games (Goals)
2014–2016	Greater Western Sydney	21 (36)
2017–2020	Fremantle	49 (63)
Total		70 (99)
- ^{1} Playing statistics correct to the end of 2020.

Career highlights
- Fremantle leading goalkicker: 2017; 2015 AFL Rising Star: nominee

Cameron Alex McCarthy (1 April 1995 − 9 May 2024) was an Australian rules footballer who played for the Greater Western Sydney Giants and Fremantle Football Club in the Australian Football League (AFL).

== Early career ==
McCarthy came from a cricket background and focused on becoming a footballer after being the last player chosen in the Western Australia under-18 team in 2013; this was due to his talents in both cricket and football. He chose the AFL pathway after some inspiration from a South Fremantle colts coach. He had previously played junior football for South Coogee. He came to prominence with an impressive AFL Under-18 Championships, with the highlight being when he kicked the winning after-the-siren goal for Western Australia against Vic Country in Round 4 of the Championships before suffering a broken leg in the final round against South Australia.

== AFL career ==
McCarthy was drafted by the Greater Western Sydney Giants with pick 14 in the 2013 AFL draft. He made his debut in Round 23, 2014, against the Western Bulldogs at Etihad Stadium; McCarthy started the game as the substitute but kicked a long goal from the boundary line with his first kick in AFL football.

On 10 September 2015, news broke that McCarthy was requesting a trade to his home state of Western Australia; the next day, Greater Western Sydney "categorically rejected" his trade request due to him being contracted until the end of the 2017 season. Despite persistent efforts by Fremantle during the trade period, he remained at Greater Western Sydney. After the failed bid to move to Fremantle during the home period, McCarthy decided to return to Western Australia due to homesickness and did not play for the entirety of the 2016 AFL season. He was officially traded to Fremantle during the 2016 trade period.

In 2017, McCarthy kicked 25 goals from 19 games. He finished first in Fremantle's leading goalkicking. He was suspended for two weeks in round 15 for careless contact with St Kilda's Sam Gilbert. He was also surprisingly omitted from the Round 23 team who took on Essendon. His most notable performance came in Round 4, where he kicked a late goal with a toe-poke deep in the goal square, with two minutes remaining, to lead Fremantle to a two-point victory over Melbourne, in Melbourne. Another impressive performance was a four-goal haul, with 18 disposals, against Gold Coast in Round 20 at Domain Stadium.

In 2019, ahead of the Round 1 clash with North Melbourne, McCarthy was called up to the senior team, seemingly as a replacement for new recruit Jesse Hogan, despite not playing in either pre-season match. He was arguably Fremantle's best player in the demolition of North Melbourne in a career-best performance, kicking five goals and collecting 20 disposals.

In August 2020, McCarthy was notified by the Fremantle Football Club that he would not be receiving a contract for the 2021 AFL season; McCarthy and Fremantle mutually parted ways.

McCarthy returned to South Fremantle Football Club in the WAFL for two seasons, but he walked away from the sport after managing just 10 games in that time.

== Personal life and death ==
McCarthy was educated at Emmanuel Catholic College in Success. He left school at 16 to take up a plumbing apprenticeship prior to being drafted.

After collapsing during a training session in 2020, McCarthy was diagnosed with epilepsy.

On 9 May 2024, McCarthy was found dead at a property in Lake Coogee, a suburb of Perth. He was 29.

== Statistics ==
Statistics are correct to the end of the 2020 season

Legend
G	Goals	K	Kicks	D	Disposals	T	Tackles
B	Behinds	H	Handballs	M	Marks

Season	Team	No.	Games	Totals							Averages (per game)						
Season	Team	No.	Games	G	B	K	H	D	M	T	G	B	K	H	D	M	T
2014	Greater Western Sydney	25	1	1	0	3	2	5	2	2	1.0	0.0	3.0	2.0	5.0	2.0	2.0
2015	Greater Western Sydney	25	20	35	14	132	48	180	73	24	1.8	0.7	6.6	2.4	9.0	3.6	1.2
2016	Greater Western Sydney	25	0	—	—	—	—	—	—	—	—	—	—	—	—	—	—
2017	Fremantle	23	19	25	19	150	65	215	65	45	1.3	1	7.9	3.4	11.3	3.4	2.4
2018	Fremantle	23	17	19	17	107	62	169	65	30	1.1	1	6.3	3.6	9.9	3.8	1.8
2019	Fremantle	23	12	19	7	94	42	136	49	15	1.6	0.6	7.8	3.5	11.3	4.1	1.3
2020	Fremantle	23	1	0	1	8	3	11	3	1	0	1	8	3	11	3	1
Career			70	99	58	494	222	716	257	117	1.4	0.8	7.1	3.2	10.2	3.7	1.7
