= South West Football League =

South West Football League
Established	1957 (Bunbury/Collie league 1953)
Teams	11
2025 premiers	South Bunbury
Most premierships	20 - South Bunbury
Website	www.swfl.com.au

The South West Football League is an Australian rules football league based in the south-west of Western Australia. The league is affiliated to Country Football WA, formerly known as the West Australian Country Football League.

== History ==
The idea of creating a larger league was discussed early in 1951. The idea that three clubs from the Collie Football Association and the three clubs from the Bunbury Football association would invigorate public interest in the South West region on the state. Talks continued into 1952 and it was finally agreed to trial a competition with all the two associations clubs for a two-year period. The associations administrations would remain separate. Sensing opportunity, Donnybrook left their local competition to become the seventh club.

In 1953 the Bunbury-Collie League was founded with seven teams. South Bunbury, Bunbury Railways, Bunbury Pastimes, Mines Rovers, Collie Railways, Centrals and Donnybrook. The public response was evident, interest was up, attendances to games were up and the general standard of play improved greatly.

The trial was deemed so successful that it kicked off a series of consolidations of smaller leagues within the state of Western Australia.

- 1954 Eastern and Western Districts Busselton commenced from Busselton FA.
- 1955 Eastern and Western Districts Busselton amalgamated to become Busselton
- 1956 Harvey Brunswick admitted, Bunbury Pastimes becomes Carey Park
- 1957, the league changed names to the South West National Football League.
- 1959 Boyanup-Capel-Dardanup joins
- 1961 Collie Railways and centrals amalgamate to become Collie
- 1966 Augusta-Margaret River joins
- 1990 Harvey Brunswick become Harvey Brunswick Leschenault
- 1991 The league changes its name to the South West Football League
- 2000 Boyanup-Capel-Dardanup relocates to Eaton and changes name to Eaton Boomers.
- 2001 Collie and Mines Rovers amalgamated to become Collie Eagles
- 2009 Harvey Bulls commence, transferred from Peel Football League.
- 2022 Dunsborough Sharks women's, colts and reserves team commence playing
- 2023 Dunsborough Sharks league team commence playing

=== Expansion ===
In 1993 a proposed submission from the new Harvey Football Club was rejected because the SWFL believed 10 teams was a sufficient number. Harvey then put in a successful submission into the Peel Football League where they played their first season in 1994.

The start of the 2009 season saw the introduction of the Harvey Bulls, who made the move over from the expanding Peel Football League. This was different from their bid in 1993, as they had nowhere else to go. The SWFL were also looking for a tenth team (after the merger of Collie and Mines) to get rid of the dreaded bye and extended season. Harvey left the PFL because of the rumour of Perth teams entering the PFL for 2009 so therefore increasing travel commitments. This idea fell through but Harvey still joined the SWFL after an 8–1 vote by the SWFL clubs, with HBL the only club opposing the idea.

During January 2021, the Dunsborough Sharks, who field juniors teams in the South West put in an application to field a colts side ahead of the 2021 season. This was rejected. Post the 2021 season the Dunsborough Sharks put in an application for a Reserves, Colts and Women's team for the 2022 season. These applications were accepted with a 7–3 vote, allowing the Sharks to field a league team for the 2023 season.

== Clubs ==
=== Locations ===
Club locations - Bunbury	Club locations - Greater South West

=== Current ===
Club	Colours	Nickname	Home Ground	Former League	Est.	Years in SWFL	SWFL Premierships	
Club	Colours	Nickname	Home Ground	Former League	Est.	Years in SWFL	Total	Years
Augusta Margaret River		Hawks	Gloucester Park, Margaret River	–	1966	1966-	5	1994, 1995, 2011, 2021, 2022
Bunbury		Bulldogs	PC Payne Park, Bunbury	BFA	1892	1953-	10	1956, 1958, 1961, 1962, 1970, 1982, 1983, 2001, 2017, 2020
Busselton		Magpies	Sir Stuart Bovell Park, Busselton	–	1955	1955-	6	1964, 1967, 1978, 1996, 2012, 2015, 2023
Carey Park (Bunbury Pastimes 1953-56)		Panthers	Kelly Park, Bunbury	BFA	1914	1953-	7	1963, 1973, 1986, 2003, 2006, 2008, 2009
Collie Eagles		Eagles	Collie Recreation Ground, Collie	–	2002	2002-	2	2004, 2005
Dunsborough		Sharks	Dunsborough Playing Fields, Dunsborough	–	1996	2022-	0	-
Donnybrook		Dons	VC Mitchell Park, Donnybrook	DFA	1897	1953-	5	1977, 1998, 1999, 2000, 2018
Eaton (Boyanup-Capel-Dardanup 1959-99)	(1959-2024)(2025-)	Boomers	Glen Huon Oval, Eaton	–	1959	1959-	2	2013, 2014
Harvey Bulls		Bulls	Harvey Recreation Ground, Harvey	PFNL	1994	2009-	0	-
Harvey Brunswick Leschenault (Harvey Brunswick 1956-90)		Lions	Brunswick Oval, Brunswick Junction	HBFA	1956	1956-	9	1960, 1974, 1975, 1990, 1991, 1992, 2007, 2010, 2019
South Bunbury		Tigers	Hands Oval, South Bunbury	BFA	1897	1953-	20	1953, 1954, 1955, 1957, 1959, 1966, 1968, 1971, 1976, 1980, 1981, 1984, 1985, 1988, 1989, 1993, 2002, 2016, 2024, 2025

=== Former ===
Club	Colours	Nickname	Home Ground	Former League	Est.	Years in SWFL	SWFL Premierships		Fate
Club	Colours	Nickname	Home Ground	Former League	Est.	Years in SWFL	Total	Years	Fate
Collie Centrals		Centrals	Collie Recreation Ground, Collie	CFA		1953-1961	0	-	Merged with Collie Railways to form Collie Saints in 1962
Collie Railways			Collie Recreation Ground, Collie	CFA		1953-1961	0	-	Merged with Collie Centrals to form Collie Saints in 1962
Collie Saints		Saints	Collie Recreation Ground, Collie	–	1962	1962-2001	2	1972, 1987	Merged with Mines Rovers to form Collie Eagles in 2002
East Busselton				BFA		1954	0	-	Merged with West Busselton to form Busselton in 1955
Mines Rovers		Rovers	Collie Recreation Ground, Collie	CFA		1953-2001	4	1965, 1969, 1979, 1997	Merged with Collie Saints to form Collie Eagles in 2002
West Busselton				BFA		1954	0	-	Merged with East Busselton to form Busselton in 1955

== Grand Finals (2009–2024) ==
Year	Premier	Score	Runner up	Score	Pike Medalist	Field Umpires
2009	Carey Park	8.7(55)	South Bunbury	4.9 (33)	Scott Roche (CP)	Anthony Raudino, Mike Hearne, Kane Whittaker
2010	Harvey Brunswick Leschanult	9.11 (65)	South Bunbury	6.11(47)	Daniel Houghton (HBL)	Anthony Raudino, Mike Hearne, Kane Whittaker
2011	Augusta Margaret River	13.11 (89)	South Bunbury	9.7(61)	Cody Miller (AMR)	Mike Hearne, Kane Whittaker, Cam Edmonds (EMG Jodi Maisley)
2012	Busselton	9.14 (68) (Draw), 11.8 (74)(Replay)	Collie Eagles	10.8 (68) (Draw) 5.9 (39) (Replay)	Dan McGinlay (BSN), Louis Davies (BSN)	Paul Matthews, Peter Franklin, Anthony Raudino (Draw), Scott Jones (EMG Draw, Main Replay), (EMG Replay Matt Carpenter)
2013	Eaton Boomers	9.13 (67)	Collie Eagles	6.7 (43)	Gino Catalano/]osh Bowe/Michael Battaglia (EB)	Paul Matthews, Scott Jones, Matt Carpenter (EMG Aaron Andrews)
2014	Eaton Boomers	10.9 (69)	South Bunbury	5.8 (38)	Chris Atthowe (EB)	Aaron Andrews, Scott Jones, Glen Omodei (EMG Peter Franklin)
2015	Busselton	15.13 (103)	Carey Park	7.16 (58)	Brent Hall (BSN)	Adam Hauswirth, Glen Omodei, Kevin Hutchins (EMG Bernie Stokes)
2016	South Bunbury	12.14 (86)	Collie Eagles	4.7 (31)	Dylan Harper (SB)	Adam Hauswirth, Aaron Andrews, Zak Shurko (EMG Matt Stewart)
2017	Bunbury	10.8 (68)	Harvey Brunswick Leschanult	2.6 (18)	Aidan Clarke (BB)	Adam Hauswirth, Aaron Andrews, Shane Miller (EMG Kevin Hutchins)
2018	Donnybrook	16.16 (112)	Bunbury	11.7 (74)	Brett Eades (DBK)	Mike Hearne, Aaron Andrews, Kevin Hutchins (EMG Darren Browne)
2019	Harvey Brunswick Leschanult	9.11 (65)	Eaton Boomers	4.12 (36)	Jack Fletcher (HBL)	Greg Rolfe, Matt Carpenter, Damien O'Donoghue (EMG Kevin Hutchins)
2020	Bunbury Bulldogs	11.8 (74)	Busselton Magpies	10.9 (69)	Jesse Gribble (BB)	Greg Rolfe, Aaron Andrews, Scott Jones (EMG Paul Davey)
2021	Augusta Margaret River	10.6 (66)	Busselton Magpies	3.8 (26)	Simon Moore (AMR)	Scott Jones, Greg Rolfe, Mike Hearne (EMG Cam Edmonds)
2022	Augusta Margaret River	5.7 (37)	South Bunbury	4.9 (33)	Jace Cormack (SB)	
2023	Busselton	8.13 (61)	Carey Park	8.10 (58)	Cooper Sparks (CP)	
2024	South Bunbury	15.9 (99)	Bunbury	8.9 (57)	Tyson Lane (SB)	
2025	South Bunbury	10.14 (74)	Busselton	10.13 (73)	Kade Wallrodt (SB)	

== Awards ==
=== Hayward Medal (Best & Fairest) ===
Year	Winner	Club	Votes
1953	John Ellis	Carey Park	
1954	Gil Brennan	Busselton	
1955	Robert Farquhar	South Bunbury	
1956	Mayne Coverley	Mines Rovers	
1957	Mayne Coverley	Mines Rovers	19
1958	Mayne Coverley	Mines Rovers	18
1959	Robert Farquhar	South Bunbury	22
1960	George Annandale	Mines Rovers	23
1961	Syd Jackson	South Bunbury	22
1962	Syd Jackson	South Bunbury	19
1963	Neville Carter	Busselton	16
1964	Ray Scott Barry Annandale	Boyanup Capel Dardanup Mines Rovers	18
1965	John Rogers	Bunbury	23
1966	Mick Merritt	Augusta Margaret River	27
1967	Jack Sumich	Mines Rovers	27
1968	Max McGuire Ian Fisher	Bunbury Harvey Brunswick	20
1969	Terry House	South Bunbury	22
1970	George Spalding	Bunbury	23
1971	Keith Bedford Merv Kennedy	Donnybrook South Bunbury	14
1972	David Barnard	Boyanup Capel Dardanup	20
1973	Terry House	South Bunbury	19
1974	Merv Kennedy	South Bunbury	24
1975	Rod Saunders Bill Hayward	Mines Rovers Collie	27
1976	Ross Tyson	Augusta Margaret River	24
1977	Ross Tyson	Augusta Margaret River	29
1978	Wayne Watterson	Busselton	23
1979	John Awcock	Donnybrook	22
1980	John Cormack	Carey Park	23
1981	Peter Ivanoff	Augusta Margaret River	39
1982	Leigh Wright	South Bunbury	25
1983	David Morris	Harvey Brunswick	28
1984	Peter Old	South Bunbury	21
1985	Richie Lee	Augusta Margaret River	19
1986	Richie Lee	Augusta Margaret River	23
1987	Grant Hawkes	Bunbury	25
1988	Mark Skehan Graham Jeffrey	Carey Park Harvey Brunswick	22
1989	Mark Blakely	Boyanup Capel Dardanup	28
1990	Darren Best Justin Cook	Boyanup Capel Dardanup Augusta Margaret River	21
1991	Graham Jeffrey	Harvey Brunswick	21
1992	Brett Glass	Boyanup Capel Dardanup	23
1993	Grant Hawkes	Bunbury	29
1994	Blair Carter	Busselton	21
1995	Swan Widdeston	Carey Park	19
1996	Shane Atherton	Donnnybrook	19
1997	Tony Strano Craig Chiswell	Harvey Brunswick Leschenault Donnybrook	23
1998	Michael Miller	Busselton	26
1999	Aaron Marley	Mines Rovers	37
2000	Peter Worsfold	Donnybrook	32
2001	Jamie Nani	Bunbury	34
2002	Craig Chiswell	Donnybrook	15
2003	James McRae	Carey Park	24
2004	Rhys Croxford	Carey Park	23
2005	Michael Sherry Nathan Bradbury	Bunbury Busselton	24
2006	Travis Edmonds	Carey Park	23
2007	John Klumpp	Harvey Brunswick Leschenault	18
2008	Justin Wilson	Carey Park	23
2009	Jeff Smith	Donnybrook	22
2010	Jesse Gribble	Bunbury	24
2011	Ryan MacKenzie	South Bunbury	29
2012	Jeremy Humm	Augusta Margaret River	19
2013	Jeff Smith	Donnybrook	29
2014	Jesse Gribble	Bunbury	27
2015	Chris Kane	Busselton	25
2016	Jace Cormack	Eaton Boomers	29
2017	Travis Cleggett	Collie Eagles	25
2018	Mitch Lynn	Augusta Margaret River	31
2019	Jesse Critchon	Harvey Brunswick Leschenault	22
2020	Brendan Tingey	Harvey Brunswick Leschenault	14
2021	Simon Moore	Augusta Margaret River	28
2022	Simon Moore	Augusta Margaret River	31
2023	Harley Sparks	Carey Park	42
2024	Ty Anderson	Harvey Brunswick Leschenault	34
2025	Ty Anderson Jed Spence	Harvey Brunswick Leschenault Augusta Margaret River	24
2026	Mitch Tenardi	Busselton	27

=== Leading Goalkicker ===
Year	Winner	Club	Goals
1957	Ron Tresize	Bunbury	43
1958	Ron Tresize A Howlett	Bunbury Donnybrook	48
1959	Ron Tresize	Bunbury	
1960	Jim Rowberry	Harvey Brunswick	
1961	J Williams	Donnybrook	55
1962	T Williams	Boyanup Capel Dardanup	53
1963	John Rogers	Bunbury	83
1964	Brian Pross	Busselton	104
1965	Brian Pross	Busselton	59
1966	Don Aldersea	South Bunbury	59
1967	Don Aldersea	South Bunbury	87
1968	Ray Browning	Donnybrook	57
1969	Peter Betti	Donnybrook	57
1970	Eric Gorman	Mines Rovers	84
1971	Sid Simeon	Boyanup Capel Dardanup	71
1972	Sid Simeon	South Bunbury	67
1973	David Lightfoot	Carey Park	113
1974	Mark Olsen	Harvey Brunswick	82
1975	Basil Little	Harvey Brunswick	81
1976	David Lightfoot	Carey Park	75
1977	Geoff Saunders	Mines Rovers	55
1978	Mark Patrick John Willoughby	South Bunbury Bunbury	60
1979	John Willoughby	Bunbury	74
1980	Paul Harris	South Bunbury	70
1981	Ray Witt	Carey Park	90
1982	Craig Hawkes	Bunbury	78
1983	David Gaunt	Bunbury	89
1984	Wayne Coles	Mines Rovers	103
1985	Paddy Madaffari	Harvey Brunswick	63
1986	Paddy Madaffari	Harvey Brunswick	80
1987	Kurnet Thorne	Carey Park	106
1988	Craig Earnshaw	Busselton	94
1989	Kurnet Thorne	Carey Park	74
1990	Jeff Davidson	Collie	62
1991	Tony Strano	Harvey Brunswick Leschenault	75
1992	Dean Johns	Bunbury	57
1993	Craig McArthur	Busselton	80
1994	Craig Gray	Boyanup Capel Dardanup	56
1995	Kevin Caton	Busselton	64
1996	Mario Tartaglia	Harvey Brunswick Leschenault	68
1997	Shaun Gardiner	Donnybrook	98
1998	Jeff Davidson	Collie	86
1999	Jeff Davidson	Collie	103
2000	Adam Matson	South Bunbury	78
2001	Kim Eades	Bunbury	100
2002	Kim Eades	Bunbury	94
2003	Steve Bilcich	South Bunbury	61
2004	Ryan Booth	Busselton	66
2005	Steele Vitti	Eaton Boomers	54
2006	Shane Nani	Carey Park	71
2007	Shane Nani	Carey Park	62
2008	Shane Nani	Carey Park	63
2009	Shane Nani	Carey Park	72
2010	Brad Smith	Harvey Bulls	78
2011	Tim Noakes	Augusta Margaret River	89
2012	Matt Martin	Carey Park	83
2013	Tim Noakes	Augusta Margaret River	64
2014	Mark Re	Bunbury	65
2015	Matt Martin	Carey Park	72
2016	Jayce Fontana Matt Martin	Collie Eagles Bunbury	46
2017	Joel Houghton	Collie Eagles	59
2018	Brett Peake	Bunbury	61
2019	Jarrod Humphries	Eaton Boomers	79
2020	Brett Hill	Harvey Brunswick Leschenault	32
2021	Bradley Holmes	Harvey Bulls	62
2022	Bradley Holmes	Harvey Bulls	63
2023	Leigh Kohlmann	South Bunbury	100
2024	Joel Houghton	Bunbury	70
2025	Liam Creighton	Busselton	60
2026	Liam Creighton	Busselton	64

== Notable players ==
- Syd Jackson
- Adam Hunter
- Phil Matson
- Leon Baker
- Michael Warren
- David Hollins
- Phil Kelly
- Michael Christian
- Ben Stratton
- Peter Miller
- Lewis Jetta
- Neville Jetta
- Kyle Reimers
- Anthony Morabito
- Paul Barnard
- Aaron Black
- Kristin Thornton
- Connor Blakely
- Troy Ugle
- Ethan Hughes
- Ben Howlett
- Sydney Stack
- Harley Bennell
- Jye Amiss
