= Harry Sheezel =

Australian rules footballer (born 2004)

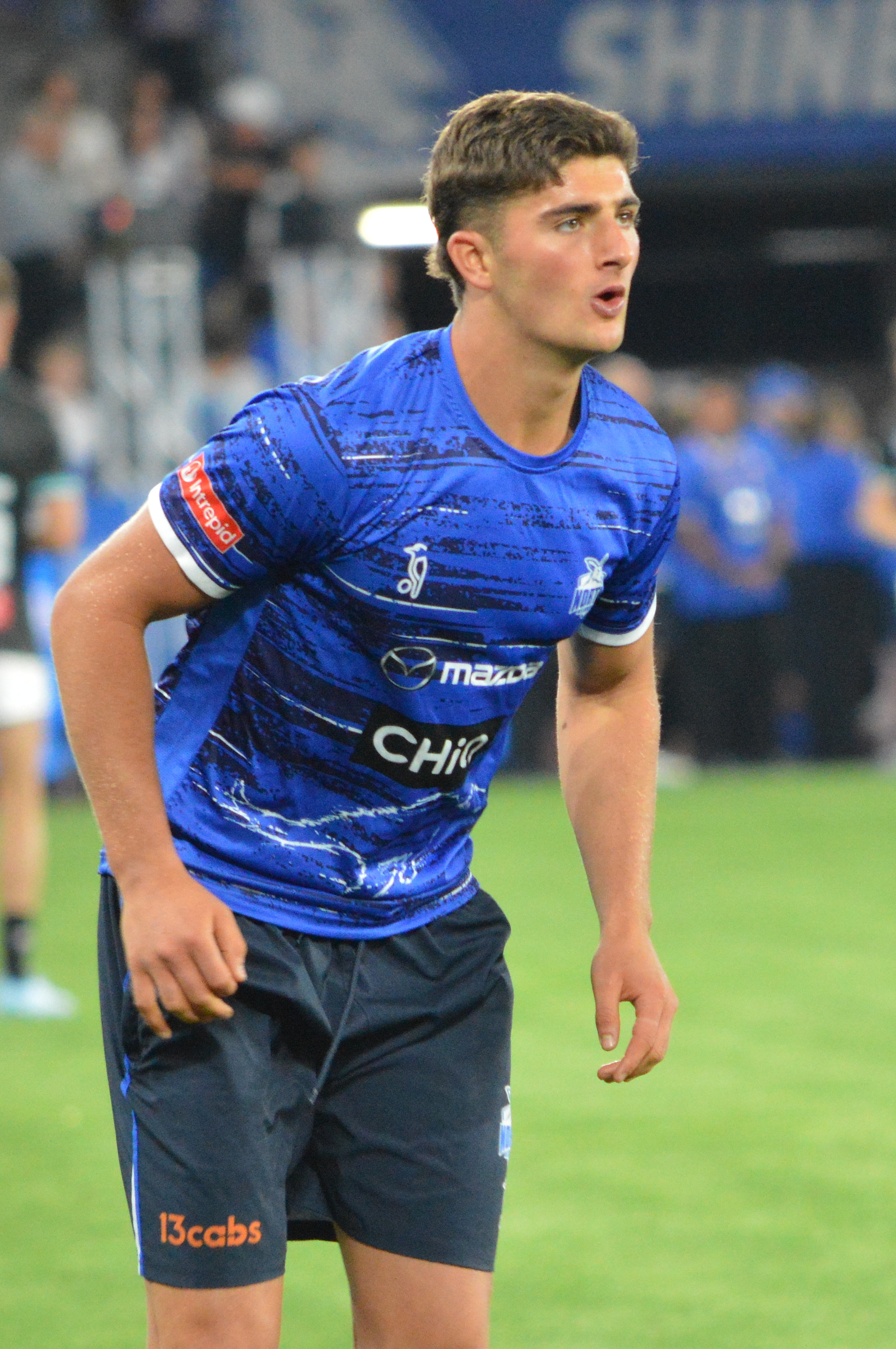
- Sheezel in March 2026

Personal information
- Full name: Harry Sheezel
- Nicknames: Sheez, Cheezel
- Born: 13 October 2004 (age 22)
- Original teams: AJAX, Sandringham Dragons
- Draft: No. 3, 2022 national draft
- Height: 187 cm (6 ft 2 in)
- Weight: 80 kg (176 lb)
- Position: Midfielder

Club information
- Current club: North Melbourne
- Number: 3

Playing career^{1}
Years	Club	Games (Goals)
2023–	North Melbourne	89 (37)
- ^{1} Playing statistics correct to the end of the 2026 season.

Career highlights
- AFL Rising Star: 2023; 3x Syd Barker Medal: 2023, 2025, 2026; AFLPA Best First Year Player: 2023; AFLCA Best Young Player: 2024; 4x 22under22 team: 2023, 2024, 2025, (c) 2026

Harry Sheezel (born 13 October 2004) is an Australian rules footballer who plays for North Melbourne in the Australian Football League (AFL). He was selected with the third pick in the 2022 AFL draft.

== Early life ==
Sheezel is Jewish. He attended Mount Scopus Memorial College, one of the country's leading Jewish schools, where he learnt to speak Hebrew. He grew up in Melbourne suburb of Malvern.

Sheezel played as a junior at AJAX Football Club and for the Sandringham Dragons. He was named in the Under-18 All-Australian team after kicking eight goals and averaging 15 disposals from four national championships. He also finished with the 36 goals in the 2022 NAB league season, the most in the league, including four or more in a game five times.

== AFL career ==
Sheezel became the first Jewish player drafted into the AFL since 1999 when North Melbourne selected him third overall in the 2022 AFL draft. He was the subject of antisemitic online abuse on social media after The Age published coverage of Sheezel and his predicted selection. Radio host Neil Mitchell called on the AFL to condemn the comments. He entered the AFL as a medium forward and had been described as a "competitive, skilful, agile, clean, and driven" player.

Sheezel made his AFL debut in round 1 of the 2023 season against the West Coast Eagles. His 34-disposal game saw him earn nomination for the AFL Rising Star Award. Following his debut, Sheezel signed a two-year contract extension with North Melbourne. Sheezel won the 2023 AFL Rising Star Award, polling 54 out of a possible 55 votes.

Sheezel also won the Syd Barker Medal, North Melbourne's Best and Fairest award, in his first season in the AFL, becoming the first player since 1986 to win an AFL Best and Fairest award in their first season, excluding expansion teams.

In the penultimate round of the 2025 AFL season against Richmond at Bellerive Oval, Sheezel equaled the record for the most disposals in a game in VFL/AFL history with 54. Sheezel won his second Best and Fairest award in 2025, tying with Tristan Xerri as joint winners.

Sheezel signed a long-term contract extension in 2026, to remain at North Melbourne until at least the end of 2032. After undergoing a minor finger surgery early in the 2026 season, Sheezel returned with 32 disposals against GWS in round 7.

Sheezel finished tied fifth in the 2026 AFL Brownlow Medal.

== Statistics ==
Updated to the end of round 22, 2026.

Legend
G	Goals	K	Kicks	D	Disposals	T	Tackles
B	Behinds	H	Handballs	M	Marks

Season	Team	No.	Games	Totals							Averages (per game)							Votes
Season	Team	No.	Games	G	B	K	H	D	M	T	G	B	K	H	D	M	T	Votes
2023	North Melbourne	3	23	3	6	357	265	622	125	67	0.1	0.3	15.5	11.5	27.0	5.4	2.9	3
2024	North Melbourne	3	21	14	1	330	296	626	133	80	0.7	0.0	15.7	14.1	29.8	6.3	3.8	15
2025	North Melbourne	3	23	8	12	341	333	674	133	99	0.3	0.5	14.8	14.5	29.3	5.8	4.3	10
2026	North Melbourne	3	21	11	12	319	335	654	143	106	0.5	0.6	15.2	16.0	31.1	6.8	5.0	27
Career			88	36	31	1347	1229	2576	534	352	0.4	0.4	15.3	14.0	29.3	6.1	4.0	55
