= Matthew Pavlich =

Australian rules footballer (born 1981)

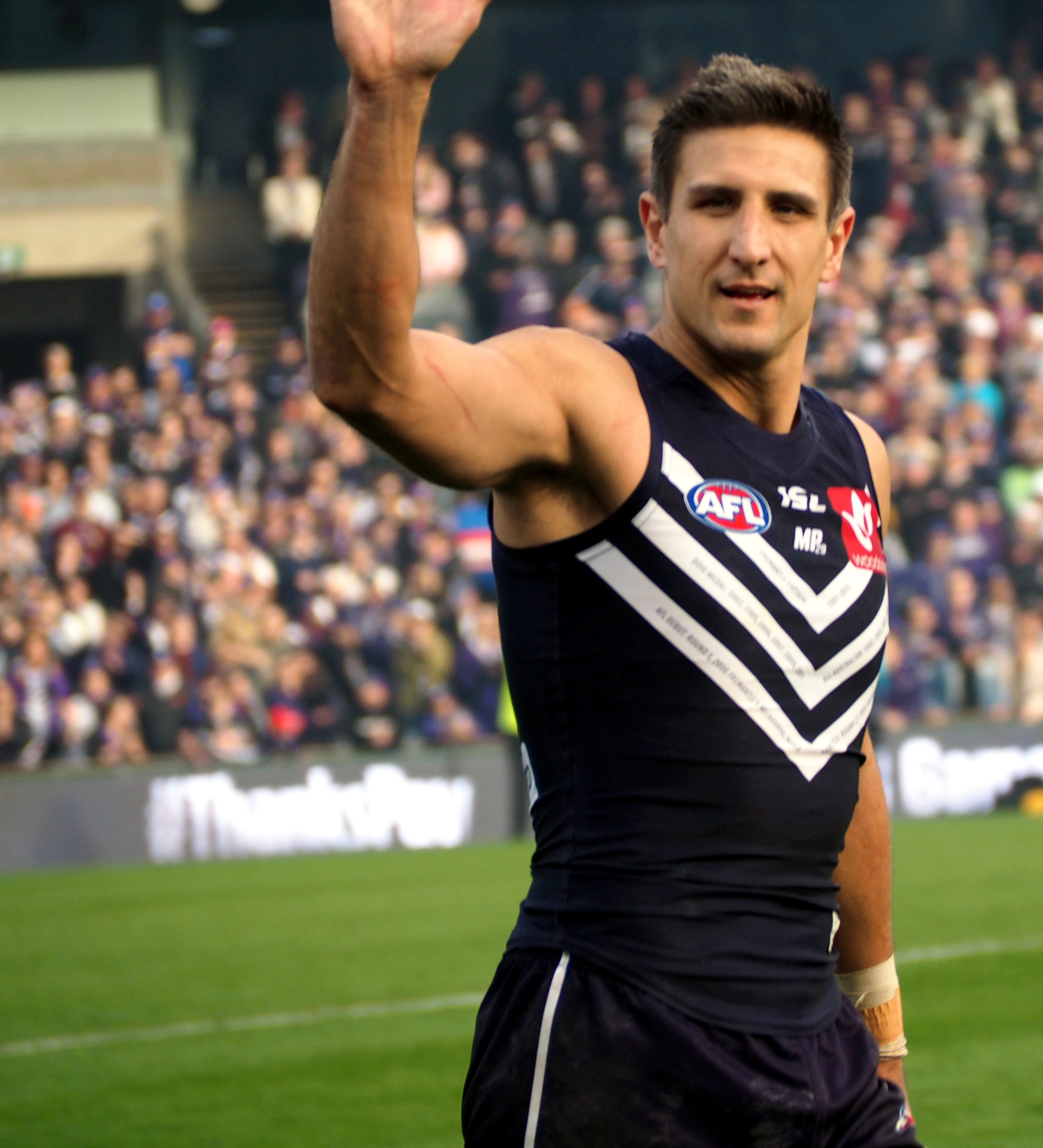
- Pavlich after his final game in 2016

Personal information
- Full name: Matthew Lee Pavlich
- Nickname: Pav
- Born: 31 December 1981 (age 44); Adelaide, South Australia
- Original team: Woodville-West Torrens (SANFL)/Sacred Heart College
- Draft: No. 4, 1999 National Draft, Fremantle
- Height: 192 cm (6 ft 4 in)
- Weight: 99 kg (218 lb)
- Positions: Key forward, key defender

Playing career^{1}
Years	Club	Games (Goals)
2000–2016	Fremantle	353 (700)

Representative team honours^{2}
Years	Team	Games (Goals)
2008	Dream Team	1 (0)

International team honours^{2}
2002–2003	Australia	4 (0)
- ^{1} Playing statistics correct to the end of 2016.^{2} Representative statistics correct as of 2003.

Career highlights
- Club: 6× Doig Medallist: 2002, 2005, 2006, 2007, 2008, 2011; Fremantle captain: 2007–2015; Fremantle 25 since '95 Team: Captain; 8× Fremantle leading goalkicker: 2001, 2005, 2006, 2007, 2008, 2009, 2010, 2012; Woodville-West Torrens leading goalkicker: 1999; AFL Rising Star nominee: 2000; 3× Geoff Christian Medal: 2002, 2005, 2008; 3× Ross Glendinning Medal: 2008, 2008, 2012; Fremantle leading goalkicker of all time; Representative: 4 games for Australia; 1 game for Dream Team; 6× All-Australian team: 2002, 2003, 2005, 2006, 2007, 2008; Honours: Fremantle Life Member: 2006; AFL Life Member: 2013; Madden Medal: 2016; West Australian Football Hall of Fame Inductee 2021; Australian Football Hall of Fame: Inductee 2022; South Australian Football Hall of Fame: Inductee 2022

Matthew Lee Pavlich (born 31 December 1981) is a former professional Australian rules footballer who played for the Fremantle Football Club in the Australian Football League (AFL). Pavlich is the chief executive of the Sydney Swans.

A versatile player, Pavlich is widely regarded as one of the premier AFL centre half-forwards of the modern era, achieving All-Australian selection six times between 2002 and 2008, twice representing Australia in the International Rules Series and representing the Dream Team in the 2008 AFL Hall of Fame Tribute Match.

Pavlich played his entire AFL career at Fremantle after making his debut for the club in 2000. Over his 17-year career, he was a six-time best and fairest winner, eight-time leading goalkicker and was the club captain between 2007 and 2015. In 2014, he became the first player from a Western Australian-based club to reach 300 AFL games.

== Early life ==
Pavlich was born in Adelaide, South Australia. He is a fifth-generation Australian of Croatian-Scottish descent. His mother, Jan, is of Scottish and German descent, while his father, Steve, is of Irish and Croatian descent. His father and two uncles played for West Torrens Football Club in the SANFL.

Pavlich played school football at Sacred Heart College in Adelaide and followed the footsteps of his father, playing senior football for the Woodville-West Torrens Eagles before he was drafted into the AFL. In 1999, he was the club's leading goalkicker.

== AFL career ==
=== Drafting ===
Pavlich was recruited by Fremantle with the fourth selection in the 1999 AFL national draft. Pavlich had nominated for the 1998 draft, but was overlooked by all clubs. Most notably Adelaide instead drafted 17-year-old Ken McGregor who went on to play 158 games between 1999 and 2008, and cross town rival Port Adelaide who instead chose 17-year-old Adam Morgan who played only 3 games between 2002 and 2003 for Port.

=== Early career (2000–2001) ===
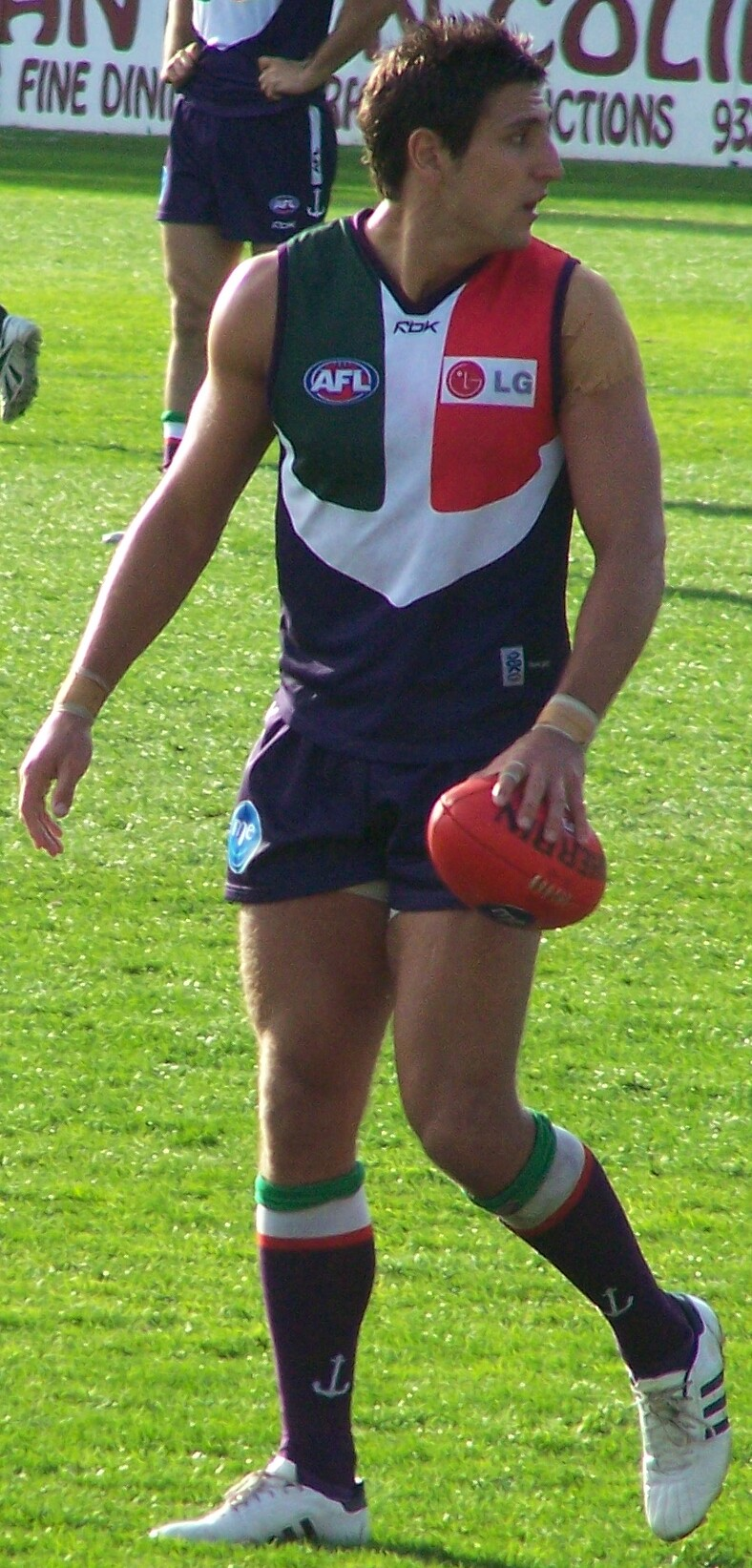
Pavlich playing for Fremantle during the 2006 AFL season

With the 2000 AFL season starting earlier than normal due to the 2000 Summer Olympics later that year in Sydney, Pavlich only played one game for South Fremantle in the Westar Rules before making his AFL debut in Round 5 against Melbourne. Pavlich achieved the rare feat of kicking 2 goals with his first 2 kicks in the AFL. He went on to play the remaining 18 games for the season, earning himself a rising star nomination in Round 17 while contributing consistently and finished ninth in the club's best and fairest award.

The 2001 Season saw Pavlich spend more time in the forward line. He managed to underline his potential with some ball grabbing performances including two 4-goal hauls against the Brisbane Lions which earned him 2 Brownlow votes, the first of his career. Pavlich went on to play 21 games for the season, finishing with a respectable 28 goals. In an otherwise disappointing season for Fremantle, Pavlich was the shining light as he started to realise his true potential.

=== Rising career (2002–2004) ===
2002 was the season that would set up Matthew Pavlich for the rest of his career. In a widely unexpected move, new Fremantle coach Chris Connolly moved Pavlich into a defensive role. Playing against some of the power forwards of the competition, Pavlich underlined his versatility and talent as a footballer, as he displayed a smooth transition into the role. He showed the uncanny ability of shutting down opponents, while gathering plenty of possession and setting up play further up the ground. This saw him earn his first All-Australian selection at fullback at the age of 20.

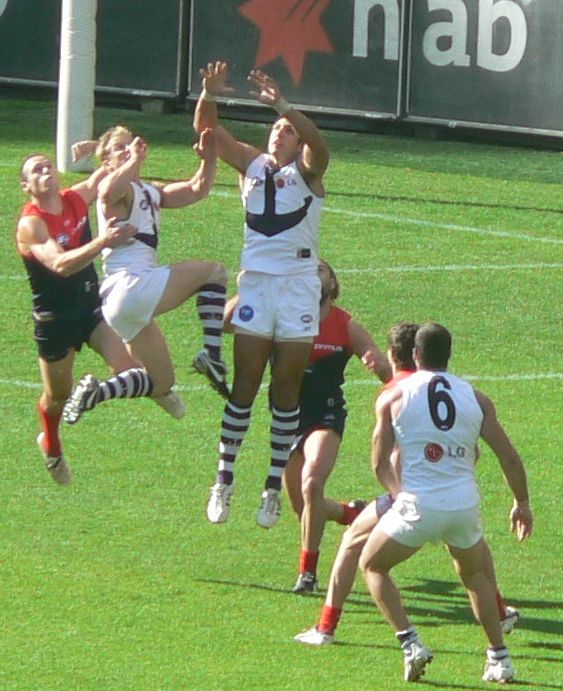
Pavlich flies high for a mark against Melbourne in 2008.

In the 2003 season he was again called upon to play a different role, Pavlich was this time thrust into a midfield role, while also pushing up to half forward. This allowed him to gather multiple possessions forward of centre and develop into a strong goal-kicking midfielder. Playing all 23 games for the season, including the club's first final, Pavlich finished off averaging 18.7 possessions per game, and executed his damaging midfield role perfectly with 37 goals. He was rewarded with a second selection in the All-Australian team for the 2003 season, this time named on the half forward flank.

=== Career high (2005–2008) ===
The 2005 season saw Pavlich moved to centre half forward, with Fremantle focusing on a taller forward structure. The move paid massive dividends for the team, as Pavlich topped Fremantle's list of goalkickers, with 61 goals for the season. He also took more marks than any other Docker and won his second Doig Medal as Fremantle's best and fairest player. In the 2005 Brownlow Medal count, Pavlich was tipped as a contender, but like Tredrea in 2004, the power forwards did not get the votes of the umpires and Pavlich finished equal ninth; receiving more votes than any other Fremantle player.

He has been selected in the All-Australian Teams six times: in 2002 (fullback), 2003 (half forward flank), 2005 (centre half forward), 2006 (interchange), 2007 (full forward) and 2008 (interchange). He was a member of the Australian International rules team in 2002 and 2003, and was a Rising Star nominee in 2000. On 13 December 2006 Pavlich was named the captain of the Fremantle Football Club, succeeding Peter Bell.

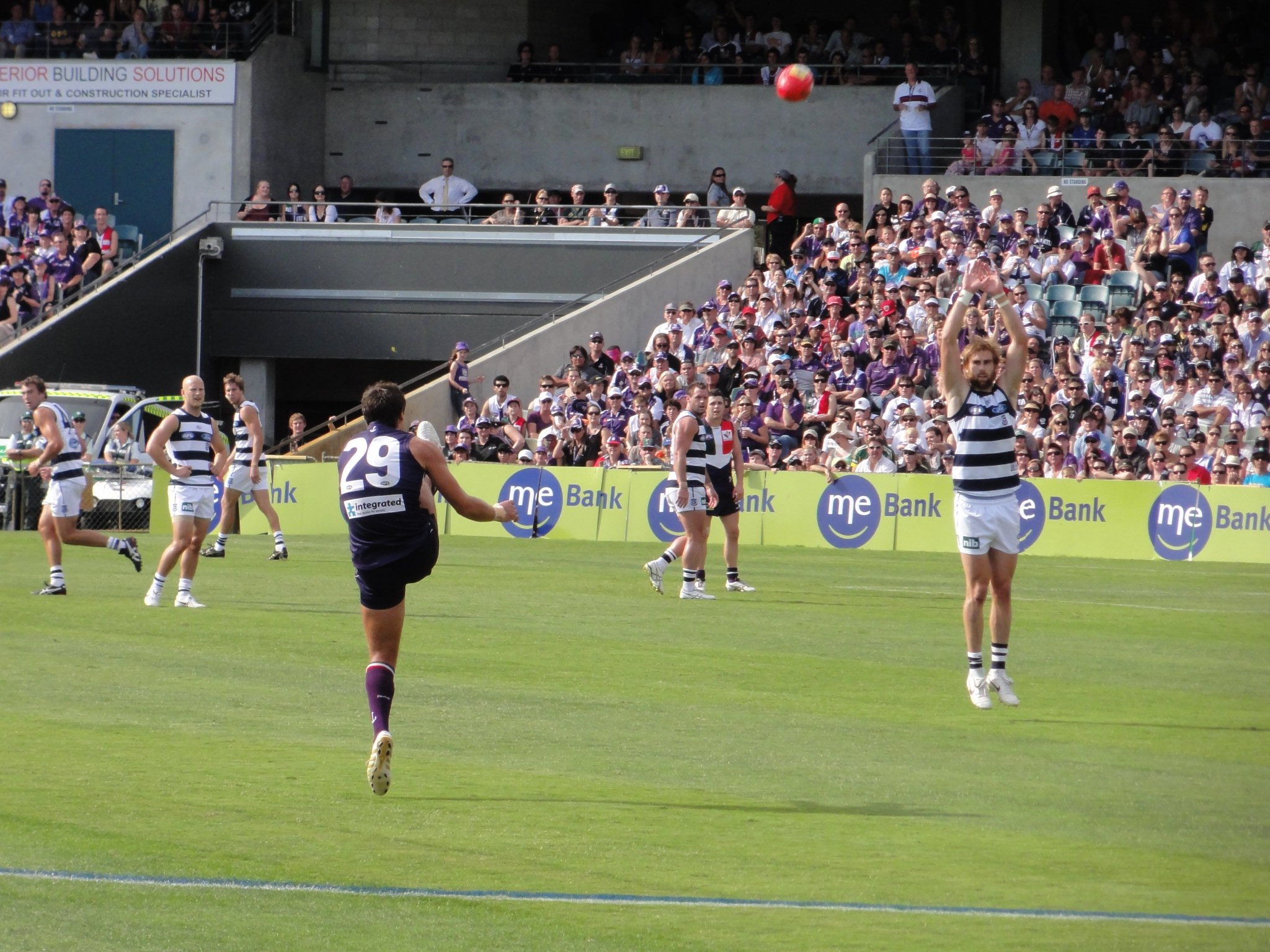
Matthew Pavlich kicks for goal in 2010.

Despite the additional burden of captaincy, Pavlich performed well throughout the 2007 season, leading an otherwise disappointing Fremantle side. He kicked a club record 72 goals, came second in the Coleman Medal and was named full-forward in the All-Australian team for 2007.

On 14 August 2007, Pavlich signed a new, three-year contract with the Fremantle Football Club, which ended speculation that he may join the Adelaide Crows or Port Adelaide. The contract was rumoured to be worth $2.5 million.

In 2008, despite Fremantle again missing the finals, Pavlich won his fifth Doig Medal, as well as being Fremantle's leading goalkicker, the Ross Glendinning Medal in both Western Derbies and his sixth All-Australian selection.

=== 2009–2011 ===
2009 saw Pavlich, under coach Mark Harvey, move into the midfield. He had a strong year averaging 21.7 disposals and leading the goal-kicking for Fremantle with 28 goals from 19 games.

Pavlich spent 2010 rotating between the midfield and forward line, averaging 18.9 disposals and leading the goal-kicking for the Dockers with 61 goals, helping his team make the finals for the first time since 2006.

Pavlich was forced back into the midfield for the 2011 season following a number of significant injuries to the Dockers. He had another successful year averaging 23.5 disposals and kicking 21 goals from 20 games. This saw Pavlich end the year with nine Brownlow Medal votes, the second highest for the Dockers and win his sixth club best and fairest, narrowly beating Nathan Fyfe.

=== 2012 season and 500th goal ===
In round 7 of the 2012 AFL season, Pavlich kicked his 500th career goal in a four-goal effort which lead his team to victory against Port Adelaide, becoming the first Fremantle player and the 51st player in VFL/AFL history to kick 500 goals. Following a permanent move to the forward line in the second half of the year, Pavlich kicked 55 goals in his final 13 games. His own form mirrored Fremantle's late-season resurgence, the highlights being an eight-goal haul in the Round 19 Western Derby and six goals in an Elimination Final victory against reigning premiers Geelong at the MCG.

=== 2013 season ===
Pavlich had a frustrating start to the 2013 season after a pre-existing Achilles tendon injury resurfaced in the Dockers round three clash against Essendon, forcing Pavlich to undergo surgery. Pavlich was originally thought to be sidelined for only four to six weeks but a longer recovery time than anticipated kept him out for sixteen weeks. Despite losing their leading goal kicker Fremantle remained in good form contending for a top four finish on the ladder throughout the season.

Pavlich made his return during Fremantle's round 20 clash against GWS kicking two goals. A win in the qualifying final against Geelong and a top 4 ladder finish saw Pavlich and the Dockers proceed to face the Sydney Swans in the preliminary finals. Pavlich played a pivotal role kicking three goals leading the Dockers to a 25-point victory and the clubs first-ever AFL Grand Final appearance. Pavlich kicked three goals in the Dockers 15-point loss to Hawthorn.

=== 2014 season ===
Pavlich played his 300th game in round 9 against the Geelong Cats. He reached another milestone in the same match, with his 600th career goal.

=== 2016 season ===
On 13 January 2016, Pavlich relinquished the captaincy of the Fremantle Football Club after nine seasons, and was replaced by David Mundy. Pavlich announced his retirement at the end of July 2016, with his final game slated to be in Round 23 against the Western Bulldogs. He stated, "I'm just looking forward to finishing the season off individually in good form and certainly helping my teammates launch towards 2017... I have nothing left to give and I can walk away feeling quite fulfilled."

In August, Pavlich's 353rd and final game saw Fremantle defeat the eventual Premiers, the Western Bulldogs, by 20 points. It was only Fremantle's fourth win for the season, and came after eight straight losses. Pavlich entered the ground with his teammates and family through a 29-person guard-of-honour of Fremantle Football Club fans. He kicked a goal in the first quarter to reach 700 career goals, which moved him into elite company in the 350-game, 700-goal club with Kevin Bartlett and Bernie Quinlan. After the game, Pavlich ran a final lap of the stadium to farewell fans before exiting the ground through a guard-of-honour consisting of current Fremantle and Western Bulldogs players, and past Fremantle players. Pavlich said he planned to have a six-month break with his family before pursuing a new career outside football, stating, "I've been doing this for 17 years; I need to do something different, I need to get into another industry and challenge myself in another sphere of life."

== Post-playing career ==
In April 2018, Pavlich was appointed the Monday–Wednesday sports presenter on Nine News Perth. He commenced in the role from Monday 16 April.

In late December 2018, Pavlich was appointed as a correspondent for Nine's Wide World of Sports coverage of the Hopman Cup Tennis tournament in Perth.

In August 2025 Pavlich was announced as the CEO of the Sydney Swans, replacing Tom Harley.

== Statistics ==
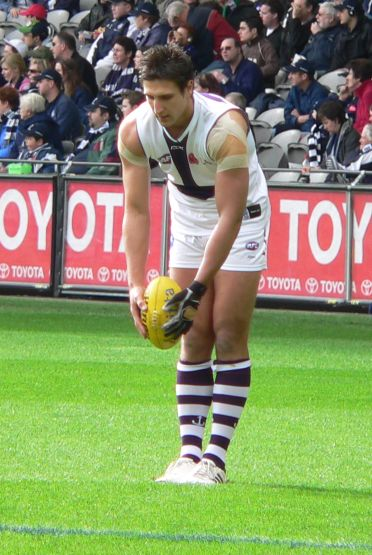
Pavlich kicking for goal in 2006

Legend
G	Goals	K	Kicks	D	Disposals	T	Tackles
B	Behinds	H	Handballs	M	Marks

Led the league after finals only
Led the league after season and finals

Season	Team	No.	Games	Totals							Averages (per game)						
Season	Team	No.	Games	G	B	K	H	D	M	T	G	B	K	H	D	M	T
2000	Fremantle	29	18	14	9	138	79	217	78	17	0.8	0.5	7.7	4.4	12.1	4.3	0.9
2001	Fremantle	29	21	28	17	217	72	289	114	27	1.3	0.8	10.3	3.4	13.8	5.4	1.3
2002	Fremantle	29	22	10	10	308	104	412	124	49	0.5	0.5	14.0	4.7	18.7	5.6	2.2
2003	Fremantle	29	23	37	30	330	119	449	112	58	1.6	1.3	14.3	5.2	19.5	4.9	2.5
2004	Fremantle	29	22	19	23	306	160	466	118	67	0.9	1.0	13.9	7.3	21.2	5.4	3.0
2005	Fremantle	29	22	61	25	271	101	372	178	25	2.8	1.1	12.3	4.6	16.9	8.1	1.1
2006	Fremantle	29	25	71	37	306	89	395	196	36	2.8	1.5	12.2	3.6	15.8	7.8	1.4
2007	Fremantle	29	22	72	48	298	83	381	203	32	3.3	2.2	13.5	3.8	17.3	9.2	1.5
2008	Fremantle	29	19	67	35	263	83	346	138	32	3.5	1.8	13.8	4.4	18.2	7.3	1.7
2009	Fremantle	29	19	28	16	237	176	413	79	72	1.5	0.8	12.5	9.3	21.7	4.2	3.8
2010	Fremantle	29	23	61	35	277	158	435	111	77	2.7	1.5	12.0	6.9	18.9	4.8	3.3
2011	Fremantle	29	20	21	20	272	199	471	73	86	1.1	1.0	13.6	10.0	23.6	3.7	4.3
2012	Fremantle	29	23	69	32	257	143	400	145	66	3.0	1.4	11.2	6.2	17.4	6.3	2.9
2013	Fremantle	29	12	25	19	108	62	170	69	24	2.1	1.6	9.0	5.2	14.2	5.8	2.0
2014	Fremantle	29	22	46	26	204	123	327	123	30	2.1	1.2	9.3	5.6	14.9	5.6	1.4
2015	Fremantle	29	22	40	28	188	132	320	99	43	1.8	1.3	8.6	6.0	14.6	4.5	2.0
2016	Fremantle	29	18	31	25	152	94	246	86	57	1.7	1.4	8.4	5.2	13.6	4.8	3.2
Career			353	700	435	4132	1977	6109	2046	798	2.0	1.2	11.7	5.6	17.3	5.8	2.3

== Honours and achievements ==
Brownlow Medal votes
Season	Votes
2000	—
2001	2
2002	3
2003	5
2004	8
2005	14
2006	15
2007	15
2008	17
2009	10
2010	9
2011	9
2012	15
2013	—
2014	—
2015	2
2016	2
Total	126

- Individual
  - All-Australian: 2002, 2003, 2005, 2006, 2007, 2008
  - International Rules Series Player: 2002, 2003
  - Doig Medal: 2002, 2005, 2006, 2007, 2008, 2011
  - Fremantle leading goalkicker: 2001, 2005, 2006, 2007, 2008, 2009, 2010, 2012
  - Fremantle Captain: 2007–2015
  - Fremantle Life Member: 2006
  - Runner-up Coleman Medal: 2007, 2012
- Team
  - McClelland Trophy (Fremantle) 2015 (C)

== Personal life ==
Pavlich married his girlfriend of eight-and-a-half years, Lauren O'Shannassy, in December 2010. In 2013, their daughter was born. During their arrival at the 2014 Brownlow Medal they announced that they were expecting a second child and, in 2015, their first son was born, and in 2016 their second son was born.

Pavlich attended Sacred Heart College (Adelaide) and the University of Western Australia.
