= 2003 International Rules Series =

- Event: International Rules Series
| Australia | Ireland |
| 101 | 94 |
- Australia win series 101-94 on aggregate

First test
| Australia | Ireland |
| 56 | 46 |
- Date: 24 October 2003
- Venue: Subiaco Oval, Perth, Western Australia
- Referee: Stephen McBurney (Aus); Brian White (Ire)
- Attendance: 41,228

Second test
| Ireland | Australia |
| 48 | 45 |
- Date: 31 October 2003
- Venue: Melbourne Cricket Ground, Melbourne, Victoria
- Referee: Stephen McBurney (Aus); Brian White (Ire)
- Attendance: 60,235

The 2003 International Rules Series was the 10th annual International Rules Series and the sixth time a test series of international rules football has been played between Australia and Ireland since the series resumed in 1998.

Despite both teams each winning a match, the series was won by Australia on an aggregate score line of 101−94 points. In doing so, the Australians recorded their third series win in the two-test format, their first consecutive series win following their seven-point aggregate win in 2002 and their first ever series victory on home soil. The series was regarded as a commercial success, generating popular media interest and a sell-out crowd for the first test at Perth's Subiaco Oval.

== Series overview ==
John O'Keefe returned as Ireland manager/coach, whilst three-time All-Australian player Garry Lyon returned for his third consecutive series as Australian coach. The first test at Subiaco Oval was an entertaining affair, with the visitors bursting out of the blocks in the first quarter, taking a 25−11 point lead thanks mainly to a superb goal from debutant Benny Coulter in the 5th minute after Dessie Dolan did well to release the ball in the course of being grounded. The second quarter was a tighter affair, with the Australian tactic of the long ball toward the net paying dividends; resulting in some fine overs from full-forward Barry Hall and leaving scores at 32−27 in favour of Ireland at half time. A frenetic third quarter ultimately went the way of the Australians, with poor shooting from the Irish forwards being compounded by two brilliant goals from Australia - one from a quick thinking Brad Johnson who shot low into the net and the other coming as a result of a penalty for a trip to Chris Johnson. Trailing 47–41 at the final break, things got worse for the Irish when Australian captain Shane Crawford was allowed to run into an open goal—and with no Irish defender in sight, the fair-haired centre calmly slid the ball into the net to catapult his side into a comfortable 7-point buffer (56−43). Ireland failed to get much closer from there, and if it was not for a terrific save from Enda Murphy in the final minute, the margin could have been greater. Australia won 56−46.

Needing to reverse a 10-point deficit to win a fourth series since its resumption in 1998, all looked rosy for Ireland early on in the second test at the Melbourne Cricket Ground, with the visitors storming to a 22−4 quarter-time lead. The bulk of the work in the first quarter was done by the likes of Steven McDonnell and Brian McDonald, the former scoring both an over and a goal and the latter netting Ireland's second six-pointer soccer-style after a delicious Benny Coulter cross to the 14-metre goal square. The Australians required decisive action in the second quarter and it was Brent Harvey and Rohan Smith who provided with terrific overs inside the opening seven minutes of the quarter. In tricky conditions and in a low-scoring contest, Ireland's Pádraic Joyce scored an over from a free to leave the visitors looking the goods at 30−15 with two quarters to play. A crucial off the ball foul on Harvey was spotted by the umpire early in the third quarter, which resulted in a successful penalty goal for the North Melbourne midfielder. Now ahead on aggregate, the Australians though reverted to sloppy disposal and the Irish responded with another Joyce over and some dominant midfield and scoring play from Steven McDonnell; Irish GAA publication Hogan Stand writing the Armagh ace popped everywhere and his workrate and ability to make marks throughout the third quarter was crucial in keeping Ireland on top. Trailing 44−27 with a quarter to play and down by 7 on aggregate, the Australians superior fitness levels came to the fore at the pivotal moment. Barry Hall, who had been rarely sighted for the first three quarters, could not be kept quiet all night and was a central figure in the final quarter comeback, kicking the first over for the term and running roughshod over the tiring Irish defence. McDonnell soon replied to a David Wirrpanda over for Ireland, yet it was Nathan Brown who showed his leadership and class by notching three crucial overs for Australia, his first coming in the 12th minute from an acutely angled sideline free before his fisted effort (15th) and opportunist strike (17th) conspired to cut Ireland’s lead to just three points, 47 to 44. This proved to be the decisive blow for Ireland, who in the closing stages could only manage a behind to keep Australia at bay and take a consolation test victory by 48 points to 45. The result left Australia to celebrate a 101−94 point aggregate victory, the home side claiming their first-ever series victory on home soil. Brent Harvey was awarded the Jim Stynes Medal for Australia.

== Squads ==
Source: 2011 International Rules Series AFL Record, p 43

Australia
Shane Crawford (C), Leo Barry, Mark Bickley, Clint Bizzell, Nathan Brown,
Jared Crouch, Barry Hall, Brent Harvey, Paul Hasleby, Lenny Hayes,
Glen Jakovich (GK), Brad Johnson, Chris Johnson, Brett Kirk, Robert Murphy,
Matthew Pavlich, Luke Power, Jade Rawlings, Matthew Scarlett, Chad Fletcher,
Adam Simpson, Rohan Smith, Daniel Wells, David Wirrpanda, Matthew Carr

Ireland
Graham Canty (C), Joe Bergin, Paddy Christie, Kevin Cassidy, Colin Corkery,
Benny Coulter, Dessie Dolan, Gary Cox, Cathal Daly, Tomás Freeman,
Joe Higgins, Kevin Hughes, Pádraic Joyce, Stephen Kelly, Tom Kelly,
Seán Marty Lockhart, Anthony Lynch, Cormac McAnallen, Brian McDonald,
Steven McDonnell, Kieran McGeeney, Paul McGrane, Enda Murphy,
Ciaran McManus, Odhran O'Dwyer, Shane Ryan

== Match results ==
=== First test (24 October) ===
| Team | 1 | 2 | 3 | 4 | Total |
|---|---|---|---|---|---|
| Australia | 0.3.2 (11) | 0.7.6 (27) | 2.9.8 (47) | 3.10.8 | (56) |
| (Republic of Ireland) Ireland | 1.6.1 (25) | 1.8.2 (32) | 1.9.8 (41) | 1.10.10 | (46) |
Australia win by 10 points

| Date | Friday, 24 October 2003 |
| Scoring (AUS) | Goals: B. Johnson, C. Johnson, Crawford Overs: Hall 4, Bizzell, Hayes, Brown; Pavlich, Hasleby, Harvey |
| Scoring (IRL) | Goals: Coulter Overs: McDonnell 4, Hughes, Joyce; McManus, McGeeney, Higgins |
| Best | AUS: Hall, Brown, C. Johnson, B. Johnson, Kirk, Hayes; IRL: McManus, McDonnell, Coulter, Canty |
| Injuries | AUS: Nil; IRL: Nil |
| Venue | Subiaco Oval |
| Attendance | 41,228 (Sell-out) |
| Umpires | Stephen McBurney (Aus); Brian White (Ire) |
| Report | Match Report |
| Video | RTÉ Broadcast of the 1st Test (YouTube) |

=== Second test (31 October) ===
| Team | 1 | 2 | 3 | 4 | Total |
|---|---|---|---|---|---|
| Australia | 0.1.1 (4) | 0.4.3 (15) | 1.5.6 (27) | 1.10.9 | (45) |
| (Republic of Ireland) Ireland | 2.2.4 (22) | 2.4.6 (30) | 2.8.8 (44) | 2.9.9 | (48) |
Ireland win by 3 points (Australia win by 7 points on aggregate)

| Date | Friday, 31 October 2003 |
| Scoring (AUS) | Goals: Harvey Overs: Brown 3, Wirrpanda 2, Hall, Smith, B. Johnson, Harvey, Pavlich |
| Scoring (IRL) | Goals: McDonald, McDonnell Overs: McDonnell 3, Joyce 2, Coulter, Dolan, Lynch, McDonald |
| Best | AUS: Brown, Harvey, Power, Crawford; IRL: Joyce, McDonnell, Lynch, McDonald, Canty |
| Injuries | AUS: Nil; IRL: Nil |
| Venue | Melbourne Cricket Ground |
| Attendance | 60,235 |
| Umpires | Stephen McBurney (Aus); Brian White (Ire) |
| Report | Match Report |
| Video | RTÉ Broadcast of the 2nd Test (YouTube) |

== See also ==
- International rules football
- Gaelic football
- Australian rules football
- Relationship between Gaelic football and Australian rules football
