= Ireland national international rules football team =

Ireland
- Emblem
- Union: Gaelic Athletic Association
- Head coach: Joe Kernan (2017)
- Captain: Aidan O'Shea (2017)
- Home stadium: Croke Park
First colours

First international
- (Republic of Ireland) Ireland 4.8.9–2.15.13 Australia (Cork, Ireland; 21 October 1984)

Biggest win
- (Republic of Ireland) Ireland 6.22.14–2.7.4 Australia (Dublin, Ireland; 26 October 2013)

Biggest defeat
- (Republic of Ireland) Ireland 0.7.10–3.15.6 Australia (Dublin, Ireland; 5 November 2006)

The Ireland international rules football team is the representative team for Ireland in international rules football, a compromise between Gaelic football and Australian rules football. The team is made up of Irish players from the Gaelic Athletic Association and Australian Football League.

Prior to 2006, an under-19 and under-17 team had participated in a similar series, while a women's team participated in 2006. Currently, the Ireland team plays at least one of its home games at Croke Park, with recent alternative venues being Pearse Stadium in Galway in 2006, the Gaelic Grounds in Limerick in 2010 and Breffni Park in Cavan in 2013.

At present the only team Ireland plays is the Australia international rules football team, on an annual basis in the International Rules Series. As of 2015, Ireland have won ten of 19 series, won 21 of 40 test matches played and participated in two draws, all since the inaugural 1984 Series.

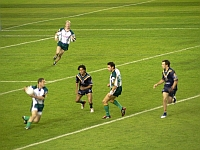
Ireland v. Australia in 2005

== Squads ==
=== 2017 squad (Tour to Australia) ===
- Aidan O'Shea (Mayo) – Captain
- Conor McManus (Monaghan) – Vice Captain
- Niall Morgan (Tyrone) – Goalkeeper
- Chris Barrett (Mayo)
- Gary Brennan (Clare)
- Eoin Cadogan (Cork)
- Killian Clarke (Cavan)
- Peter Crowley (Kerry)
- Kevin Feely (Kildare)
- Paul Geaney (Kerry)
- Niall Grimley (Armagh)
- Pearce Hanley (Gold Coast & Mayo)
- Brendan Harrison (Mayo)
- Darren Hughes (Monaghan)
- Michael Murphy (Donegal)
- Niall Murphy (Sligo)
- Paul Murphy (Kerry)
- Karl O'Connell (Monaghan)
- Seán Powter (Cork)
- Ciarán Sheehan (Cork)
- Niall Sludden (Tyrone)
- Enda Smith (Roscommon)
- Conor Sweeney (Tipperary)
- Zach Tuohy (Geelong & Laois)
- Shane Walsh (Galway)

Manager: Joe Kernan

=== 2015 squad ===
- Bernard Brogan (Dublin) – Captain
- Lee Keegan (Mayo) – Vice Captain
- Niall Morgan (Tyrone) – Goalkeeper
- Colm Begley (Laois)
- Gary Brennan (Clare)
- Eoin Cadogan (Cork)
- Mattie Donnelly (Tyrone)
- Eoin Doyle (Kildare)
- Peter Harte (Tyrone)
- Darren Hughes (Monaghan)
- Paul Kerrigan (Cork)
- Jack McCaffrey (Dublin)
- Ciarán McDonald (Tipperary)
- Philly McMahon (Dublin)
- Conor McManus (Monaghan)
- Rory O'Carroll (Dublin)
- John O'Loughlin (Laois)
- Aidan O'Shea (Mayo)
- Michael Quinn (Longford)
- Colm Cooper (Kerry)
- Diarmuid Connolly (Dublin)
- Paul Cribbin (Kildare)
- Paddy McBrearty (Donegal)

Manager: Joe Kernan

=== 2014 squad (Tour to Australia) ===
- Michael Murphy (Donegal) – Captain
- Aidan Walsh (Cork) – Vice Captain
- Paddy O'Rourke (Meath) – Goalkeeper
- Cathal Cregg (Roscommon)
- Mattie Donnelly (Tyrone)
- Finian Hanley (Galway)
- Pearce Hanley (Brisbane & Mayo)
- Darren Hughes (Monaghan)
- Lee Keegan (Mayo)
- James McCarthy (Dublin)
- Ciarán McDonald (Tipperary)
- Neil McGee (Donegal)
- Chrissy McKaigue (Derry)
- Kevin McKernan (Down)
- Kevin McLoughlin (Mayo)
- Conor McManus (Monaghan)
- David Moran (Kerry)
- Niall Morgan (Tyrone)
- Ross Munnelly (Laois)
- Colm Begley (Laois)
- Colm O'Neill (Cork)
- Padraig O'Neill (Kildare)
- Seán Cavanagh (Tyrone)
- Colm Boyle (Mayo)
- Aidan O'Shea (Mayo)

Manager: Paul Earley

=== 2013 squad ===
- Michael Murphy (Donegal) – Captain
- Aidan Walsh (Cork) – Vice Captain
- Paddy O'Rourke (Meath) – Goalkeeper
- Colm Begley (Laois)
- Colm Boyle (Mayo)
- Ciarán Byrne (Louth)
- Seán Cavanagh (Tyrone)
- Paul Conroy (Galway)
- Paul Flynn (Dublin)
- Finian Hanley (Galway)
- Lee Keegan (Mayo)
- Ciarán Kilkenny (Dublin)
- Paddy McBrearty (Donegal)
- Jack McCaffrey (Dublin)
- Neil McGee (Donegal)
- Chrissy McKaigue (Derry)
- Kevin McLoughlin (Mayo)
- Conor McManus (Monaghan)
- Ross Munnelly (Laois)
- Aidan O'Shea (Mayo)
- Ciarán Sheehan (Cork)
- Michael Shields (Cork)
- Zach Tuohy (Carlton & Laois)

Manager: Paul Earley

Changes ahead of second Test

- Ciarán McKeever (Armagh) for Finian Hanley
- Johnny Doyle (Kildare) for Aidan O'Shea

=== 2011 squad (Tour to Australia) ===
- Stephen Cluxton (Dublin - captain/goalkeeper)
- Ciarán McKeever (Armagh - vice captain)
- Pearce Hanley (Brisbane & Mayo)
- Eoin Cadogan (Cork)
- Kieran Donaghy (Kerry)
- Leighton Glynn (Wicklow)
- Finian Hanley (Galway)
- Emmet Bolton (Kildare)
- Darren Hughes (Monaghan)
- Tadhg Kennelly (Sydney & Kerry - Irish player of the series)
- Steven McDonnell (Armagh)
- Kevin McKernan (Down)
- Joe McMahon (Tyrone)
- Neil McGee (Donegal)
- Michael Murphy (Donegal)
- Karl Lacey (Donegal)
- Kevin Reilly (Meath)
- Aidan Walsh (Cork)
- Zach Tuohy (Carlton & Laois)
- Colm Begley (Laois)
- Brendan Murphy (Carlow)
- Eamonn Callaghan (Kildare)
- Tommy Walsh (Sydney & Kerry)
- Patrick Kelly (Cork)

Manager: Anthony Tohill

*Ireland won series 130-65 on aggregate

=== 2010 squad ===
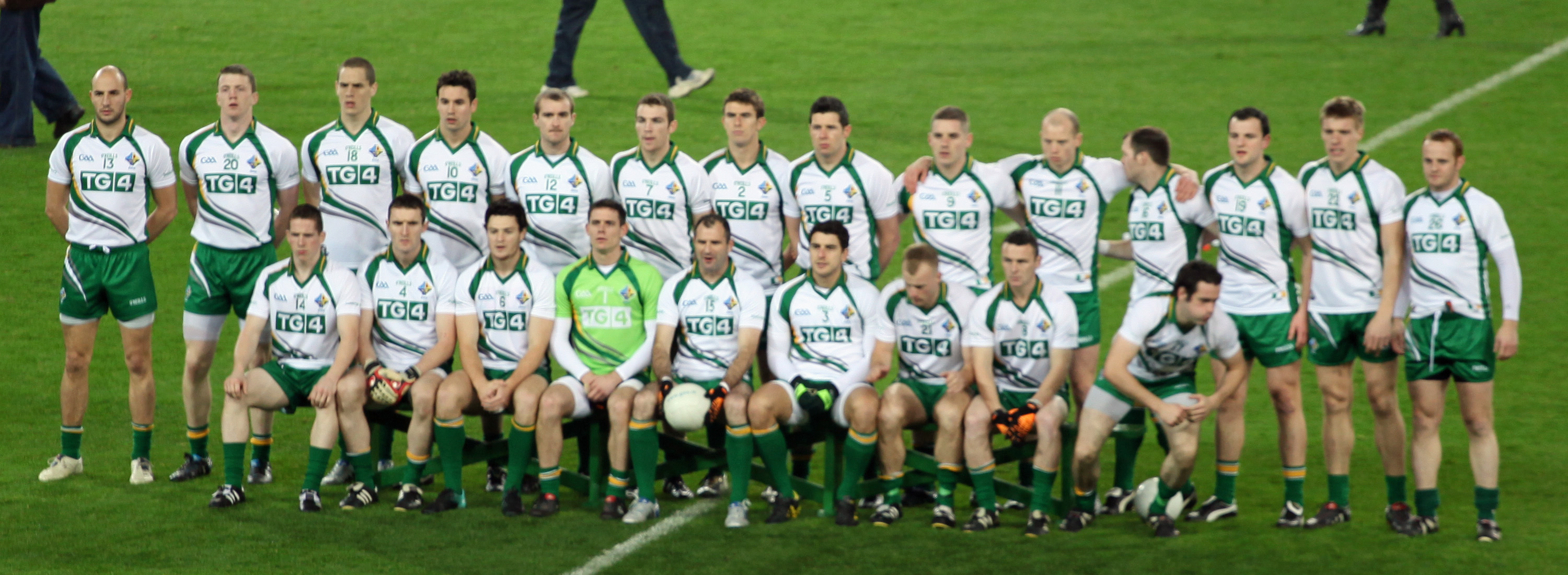
Ireland squad, 2010 International Rules Series

- Steven McDonnell (Armagh – captain)
- Finian Hanley (Galway – vice captain)
- Colm Begley (Laois – Irish player of the series)
- Bernard Brogan (Dublin)
- Graham Canty (Cork)
- Seán Cavanagh (Tyrone)
- Martin Clarke (Down)
- Stephen Cluxton (Dublin – goalkeeper)
- Brendan Donaghy (Armagh)
- Leighton Glynn (Wicklow)
- Daniel Goulding (Cork)
- James Kavanagh (Kildare)
- Paddy Keenan (Louth)
- Tadhg Kennelly (Sydney & Kerry)
- Sean McDermott (Roscommon)
- Ciarán McKeever (Armagh)
- Kevin McKernan (Down)
- Brendan Murphy (Carlow)
- Michael Murphy (Donegal)
- Kevin Reilly (Meath)
- Michael Shields (Cork)
- Tommy Walsh (St Kilda & Kerry)
- Benny Coulter (Down)
- Niall McNamee (Offaly)
- Emmet Bolton (Kildare)

Manager: Anthony Tohill

*Ireland lost series 102-92 on aggregate

=== 2008 squad (Tour to Australia) ===
- David Gallagher (Meath) goalkeeper
- Aidan O'Mahony (Kerry)
- Finian Hanley (Galway)
- John Keane (Westmeath)
- Bryan Cullen (Dublin)
- Kevin Reilly (Meath)
- Ciaran McKeever (Armagh)
- Graham Canty (Cork – Irish player of the series)
- Colm Begley (Brisbane & Laois)
- Enda McGinley (Tyrone)
- Seán Cavanagh (Tyrone) – Captain
- Joe McMahon (Tyrone)
- Steven McDonnell (Armagh)
- Kieran Donaghy (Kerry)
- Killian Young (Kerry)
- Benny Coulter (Down)
- Paddy Bradley (Derry)
- Leighton Glynn (Wicklow)
- Aaron Kernan (Armagh)
- Ciarán Lyng (Wexford)
- Justin McMahon (Tyrone)
- Michael Meehan (Galway)
- John Miskella (Cork)
- Pearse O'Neill (Cork)
- Tom Parsons (Mayo)
- Paul Finlay (Monaghan)

Manager: Seán Boylan

*Ireland won series 102-97 on aggregate

=== 2006 squad ===
- Kieran McGeeney (Captain) (Armagh)
- Tadhg Kennelly (Sydney & Kerry)
- Aidan O'Mahony (Kerry)
- Marc Ó Sé (Kerry)
- Kieran Donaghy (Kerry)
- Paul Galvin (Kerry)
- Kevin Reilly (Meath)
- Anthony Moyles (Meath)
- Graham Geraghty (Meath)
- Alan Quirke (Cork)
- Nicholas Murphy (Cork)
- Rónán Clarke (Armagh)
- Steven McDonnell (Armagh)
- Tom Kelly (Laois)
- Colm Begley (Brisbane & Laois)
- Seán Marty Lockhart (Derry)
- Shane Ryan (Dublin)
- Alan Brogan (Dublin)
- Kieran Fitzgerald (Galway)
- Joe Bergin (Galway)
- Seán Cavanagh (Tyrone)
- Brendan Coulter (Down)
- Dermot Earley (Kildare)
- Paul Barden (Longford)
- Karl Lacey (Donegal)

Manager: Seán Boylan

*Ireland lost series 109-79 on aggregate

=== 2005 squad (Tour to Australia) ===
- Michael McVeigh (Down)
- Eoin Brosnan (Kerry)
- Graham Canty (Cork)
- Seán Cavanagh (Tyrone)
- Rónán Clarke (Armagh)
- Colm Cooper (Kerry)
- Brendan Coulter (Down)
- Bryan Cullen (Dublin)
- Dessie Dolan (Westmeath)
- Brian Dooher (Tyrone)
- Mattie Forde (Wexford)
- David Heaney (Mayo)
- Phillip Jordan (Tyrone)
- Pádraic Joyce (Galway, captain)
- Tom Kelly (Laois)
- Seán Marty Lockhart (Derry)
- Anthony Lynch (Cork)
- Ciarán McDonald (Mayo)
- Brian McGuigan (Tyrone)
- Ciaran McManus (Offaly)
- Ryan McMenamin (Tyrone)
- Michael Meehan (Galway)
- Owen Mulligan (Tyrone)
- Ross Munnelly (Laois)
- Seán Óg Ó hAilpín (Cork)
- Stephen O'Neill (Tyrone)
- Tomás Ó Sé (Kerry)

=== 2004 squad ===
- Stephen Cluxton (Dublin)
- Seán Marty Lockhart (Derry)
- Graham Canty (Cork)
- Seán Óg Ó hAilpín (Cork)
- Ciaran McManus (Offaly)
- Tom Kelly (Laois)
- Joe Bergin (Laois)
- Ciarán McDonald (Mayo)
- Seán Cavanagh (Tyrone)
- Pádraic Joyce (Galway)
- Brendan Coulter (Down)
- Tadhg Kennelly (Kerry)
- Paul Galvin (Kerry)
- Steven McDonnell (Armagh)
- Dessie Dolan (Westmeath)
- Setanta Ó hAilpín (Cork)
- Alan Brogan (Dublin)
- Mattie Forde (Wexford)
- Brian McGuigan (Tyrone)
- David Heaney (Mayo)
- James Nallen (Mayo)
- Bryan Cullen (Dublin)

- Philip Loughran (Armagh)

=== 2003 squad (Tour to Australia) ===
- Enda Murphy (Kildare)
- Paddy Christie (Dublin)
- Anthony Lynch (Cork)
- Cormac McAnallen (Tyrone)
- Seán Marty Lockhart (Derry)
- Kieran McGeeney (Armagh)
- Graham Canty (Cork)
- Paul McGrane (Armagh)
- Ciaran McManus (Offaly)
- Joe Bergin (Galway)
- Brendan Coulter (Down)
- Pádraic Joyce (Galway)
- Steven McDonnell (Armagh)
- Dessie Dolan (Westmeath)
- Joe Higgins (Laois)
- Tom Kelly (Laois)
- Kevin Hughes (Tyrone)
- Shane Ryan (Dublin)
- Brian McDonald (Laois)
- Odhran O'Dwyer (Clare)
- Stephen Kelly (Limerick)

=== 2002 squad ===
- Peter Burke (Mayo)
- Joe Bergin (Galway)
- Graham Canty (Cork)
- Ray Cosgrove (Dublin)
- Dessie Dolan (Westmeath)
- Graham Geraghty (Meath)
- Trevor Giles (Meath)
- Pádraic Joyce (Galway)
- Evan Kelly (Meath)
- Tadhg Kennelly (Kerry)
- Anthony Lynch (Cork)
- Cormac McAnallen (Tyrone)
- Kieran McGeeney (Armagh)
- Paul McGrane (Armagh)
- Ciaran McManus (Offaly)
- Declan Meehan (Galway)
- Seamus Moynihan (Kerry)
- Eamonn O'Hara (Sligo)
- Darragh Ó Sé (Kerry)
- Tomás Ó Sé (Kerry)
- Brendan Jer O'Sullivan (Cork)
- Anthony Rainbow (Kildare)
- Derek Savage (Galway)
- Paul Barden (Longford)

=== 2001 squad (Tour to Australia) ===
- Cormac O'Sullivan (Meath)
- Graham Canty (Cork)
- Coman Goggins (Dublin)
- Darren Fay (Meath)
- Ciarán Whelan (Dublin)
- Seán Marty Lockhart (Derry)
- Eamonn O'Hara (Sligo)
- Ciaran McManus (Offaly)
- Kieran McGeeney (Armagh)
- Francie Grehan (Roscommon)
- Seán Óg De Paor (Galway)
- Anthony Rainbow (Kildare)
- Seamus Moynihan (Kerry)
- Anthony Tohill (Derry)
- Cormac McAnallen (Tyrone)
- Darragh Ó Sé (Kerry)
- Graham Geraghty (Meath)
- Pádraic Joyce (Galway)
- Niall Buckley (Kildare)
- Tadhg Kennelly (Kerry)
- Michael Donnellan (Galway)
- Brendan Jer O'Sullivan (Cork)
- Mike Frank Russell (Kerry)
- Dermot Earley (Kildare)
- Dermot McCabe (Cavan)
- Johnny Crowley (Kerry)
- Brendan Devenney (Donegal)

=== 2000 squad ===
- Cormac O'Sullivan (Meath)
- Declan O'Keeffe (Kerry)
- Darren Fay (Meath)
- Seamus Moynihan (Kerry)
- Seán Marty Lockhart (Derry)
- Mark Crossan (Donegal)
- Seamus Quinn (Leitrim)
- Finbar Cullen (Offaly)
- Anthony Rainbow (Kildare)
- Seán Óg de Paor (Galway)
- Eoin Sexton (Cork)
- Kieran McGeeney (Armagh)
- Glenn Ryan (Kildare)
- Anthony Tohill (Derry)
- Darragh Ó Se (Kerry)
- Brian Stynes (Dublin)
- Trevor Giles (Meath)
- Dermot Earley (Kildare)
- Colm McMenamon (Mayo)
- Michael Donnellan (Galway)
- Ciaran McManus(Offaly)
- Gerard Cavlan (Tyrone)
- Colin Moran (Dublin)
- Larry Reilly (Cavan)
- Eoin Gormley (Tyrone)
- Pádraic Joyce (Galway)
- Graham Geraghty (Meath)

*Ireland lost series 123-98 on aggregate

=== 1999 squad (Tour to Australia) ===
- Declan O'Keeffe – Goalkeeper (Kerry)
- Seán Óg De Paor (Galway)
- Darren Fay (Meath)
- Finbarr Cullen (Offaly)
- Glenn Ryan (Kildare)
- Seán Marty Lockhart (Derry)
- James Nallen (Mayo)
- John McDermott – Captain (Meath)
- Ciarán Whelan (Dublin)
- Ciarán O'Sullivan (Cork)
- Trevor Giles (Meath)
- Brian Stynes (Dublin)
- Peter Canavan (Tyrone)
- Joe Kavanagh (Cork)
- Jarlath Fallon (Galway)
- Anthony Tohill (Derry)
- Michael Donnellan (Galway)
- Seamus Moynihan (Kerry)
- Dermot Earley (Kildare)
- Niall Buckley (Kildare)
- John Quane (Limerick)
- James Horan (Mayo)
- Graham Geraghty (Meath)
- Ciaran McManus (Offaly)
- Derry Foley (Tipperary)
- Dessie Dolan (Westmeath)

=== 1998 squad ===
- Finbarr McConnell (Tyrone – goalkeeper)
- Peter Canavan (Tyrone)
- Kieran McGeeney (Armagh)
- Diarmaid Marsden (Armagh)
- Anthony Tohill (Derry)
- Seán Marty Lockhart (Derry)
- Brendan Devenney (Donegal)
- Paul Brewster (Fermanagh)
- Dermot McCabe (Cavan)
- Darren Fay (Meath)
- James Nallen (Mayo)
- Colm Parkinson (Laois)
- Derry Foley (Tipperary)
- Finbar Cullen (Offaly)
- John Kenny (Offaly)
- Brian Stynes (Dublin)
- Séamus Moynihan (Kerry)
- John McDermott (Meath) – Captain
- Jarlath Fallon (Galway)
- Michael Donnellan (Galway)
- Niall Buckley (Kildare)
- Seán Óg de Paor (Galway)
- Colm McManaman (Mayo)
- Glenn Ryan (Kildare)

*Ireland won series 128-118 on aggregate

== Roll of honour ==
=== List of captains and managers ===
Since 1998

Year	Captain	County	Result	Manager	County
1998	John McDermott	Meath	Won by 10 points	Colm O'Rourke	Meath
1999	John McDermott	Meath	Won by 8 points	Colm O'Rourke	Meath
2000	Trevor Giles	Meath	Lost by 25 points	Brian McEniff	Donegal
2001	Anthony Tohill	Derry	Won by 25 points	Brian McEniff	Donegal
2002	Séamus Moynihan	Kerry	Lost by 7 points	John O'Keefe	Kerry
2003	Graham Canty	Cork	Lost by 7 points	John O'Keefe	Kerry
2004	Pádraic Joyce	Galway	Won by 50 points	Pete McGrath	Down
2005	Pádraic Joyce	Galway	Lost by 57 points	Pete McGrath	Down
2006	Kieran McGeeney	Armagh	Lost by 30 points	Seán Boylan	Meath
2008	Seán Cavanagh	Tyrone	Won by 5 points	Seán Boylan	Meath
2010	Steven McDonnell	Armagh	Lost by 10 points	Anthony Tohill	Derry
2011	Stephen Cluxton	Dublin	Won by 65 points	Anthony Tohill	Derry
2013	Michael Murphy	Donegal	Won by 101 points	Paul Earley	Roscommon
2014	Michael Murphy	Donegal	Lost by 10 points	Paul Earley	Roscommon
2015	Bernard Brogan	Dublin	Won by 4 points	Joe Kernan	Armagh
2017	Aidan O'Shea	Mayo	Lost by 13 points	Joe Kernan	Armagh

=== List of appearances by county ===
Since 1998

- The following lists the number of occasions counties have been represented in the Ireland national team (updated to end of 2014 series).

#	County	Appearances	Player(s) record†
1	Kerry	34	Tadhg Kennelly (6 appearances)
2	Cork	32	Graham Canty (7 appearances)
3	Galway	30	Pádraic Joyce (6 appearances)
4	Tyrone	29	Seán Cavanagh (7 appearances)
5	Meath	25	Graham Geraghty (5 appearances)
=6	Dublin	24	Stephen Cluxton; Brian Stynes; Bryan Cullen (3 appearances each)
=6	Armagh	24	Steven McDonnell; Kieran McGeeney (6 appearances each)
8	Mayo	21	James Nallen (3 appearances)
=9	Kildare	20	Dermot Earley (4 appearances)
=9	Laois	20	Colm Begley (6 appearances)
11	Derry	15	Seán Marty Lockhart (8 appearances)
12	Donegal	13	Michael Murphy (4 appearances)
13	Offaly	12	Ciaran McManus (7 appearances)
14	Down	11	Brendan Coulter (6 appearances)
15	Westmeath	6	Dessie Dolan (5 appearances)
16	Monaghan	5	Conor McManus; Darren Hughes (2 appearances each)
=17	Roscommon	3	Francie Grehan; Sean McDermott; Cathal Cregg (1 appearance each)
=17	Cavan	3	Dermot McCabe (2 appearances)
=17	Tipperary	3	Derry Foley (2 appearances)
=17	Wexford	3	Mattie Forde (2 appearances)
=17	Wicklow	3	Leighton Glynn (3 appearances)
=22	Carlow	2	Brendan Murphy (2 appearances)
=22	Louth	2	Paddy Keenan; Ciarán Byrne (1 appearance each)
=22	Sligo	2	Eamonn O'Hara (2 appearances)
=22	Longford	2	Paul Barden (2 appearances)
=26	Clare	1	Odhran O'Dwyer
=26	Fermanagh	1	Paul Brewster
=26	Leitrim	1	Seamus Quinn
=26	Limerick	2	John Quane

† This figure does not indicate the number of test matches these players have played. Rather it indicates the number of times they have been selected in an Ireland squad.

== Kit suppliers and shirt sponsors ==
Year	Kit Manufacturer	Shirt Sponsor
1998–2000	O'Neills	First Active
2001–06 and 2008	O'Neills	Coca-Cola
2010-11	O'Neills	TG4
2013 and 2015	O'Neills	Irish Daily Mail
2014	O'Neills	GAAGO

== See also ==
- Ireland women's international rules football team
