= 2002 International Rules Series =

- Event: International Rules Series
Ireland	Australia
100	107
- Australia win series 107–100 on aggregate

First test
Ireland	Australia
58	65
- Date: 13 October 2002
- Venue: Croke Park, Dublin, County Dublin
- Referee: Brian White (Ireland); Scott McLaren (Australia)
- Attendance: 44,221

Second test
Australia	Ireland
42	42
- Date: 20 October 2002
- Venue: Croke Park, Dublin, County Dublin
- Referee: Brian White (Ireland); Scott McLaren (Australia)
- Attendance: 71,544

The 2002 International Rules Series was the ninth annual International Rules Series and the fifth time a test series of international rules football has been played between Ireland and Australia since the series resumed in 1998.

The series was won by Australia, who recorded their second win in the series following a seven-point win in the first test and a draw in the second test, finishing with a superior aggregate margin of 107–100 points. This marked just the second time in the history of the series that a match had finished in a draw, whilst the attendance at Dublin's Croke Park for the second test was the highest in the history of the series at that stage.

== Series overview ==
Led by captain Shane Crawford, Australia defeated Ireland 65-58 in the first test at Croke Park. Ireland were the superior side for much of the first half, a flurry of overs from Darragh Ó Sé, Dessie Dolan, Joe Bergin and Ciaran McManus giving them a 21-10 point lead at quarter time. Tempers flared in the second quarter, with David Neitz of Australia sent off for a high shoulder charge on Ireland's Paul McGrane and an all-in-row soon followed, resulting in Evan Kelly of Ireland sent off for an undisciplined punch. An over by Derek Savage in the last minute of the quarter fired Ireland into a 38-19 advantage at half-time. Irish publication Hogan Stand reported that the Aussies looked rattled and the Irish were well on course for victory. The second half saw a complete reversal of fortunes, a sloppy kick out by Irish keeper Peter Burke was swooped on by Matthew Pavlich who ran in and duly slotted home low and hard to get the Australians within ten points. A golden missed opportunity for goal was missed by Pádraic Joyce and by the end of the quarter Australia had closed the gap to two points, trailing 45-43. Forward dynamo Nathan Brown put Australia into the lead early in the final quarter with another classy over and it got worse for Ireland when Daniel Kerr scored another six-pointer after some brilliant combination play with team mates. Despite a clever high ball from Joyce resulting in a 12th-minute goal to Dessie Dolan, it was ultimately a 16th minute over from Brown of Australia which sealed the test match; the visitors winning 65-58.

The second was an even tighter, lower-scoring affair played in freezing conditions before the biggest crowd in the series' history up to that point, 71,544. John O'Keeffe's men handled the conditions better in the first quarter, leading 12-4 at the first break mainly thanks to accurate kicking from Dessie Dolan and Graham Geraghty in front of the goals. The Australians hit back in the second quarter, overs to Stephen Milne and Nathan Brown closing the gap for the visitors, though the quarter was marred by an ugly act of thuggery from Brisbane Lions back-man Brad Scott, who punched Geraghty in the face. Scott would later be found guilty at a specially convened tribunal and suspended for three international rules games.

Trailing 18-17 at the main break, Ireland charged to what appeared to be a match winning lead in the third quarter, Cormac McAnallen seizing onto a loose ball near the box and soccering high into the net. Inaccurate kicking from the likes of Tadhg Kennelly and Pádraic Joyce meant Ireland could've had a bigger lead at the final break, though the fact they dominated possession and kept Australia scoreless ensured the lead 37-18 with a quarter to play. With the breeze at their backs, the Australians came charging home in the final quarter, a hopeful punt into the square being palmed home by Luke Darcy for six points and the likes of Josh Francou, Chris Judd and Nathan Brown scoring overs for fun. Ireland held firm though, Eamonn O'Hara scoring a valuable over to leave his side six points ahead in the test match with five minutes to play. High drama followed as the Irish came forward in waves, playing their best stuff of a patchy overall performance, and Evan Kelly's intuitive flick under a high centre could well have nestled in the net on another day. Alas, it was not to be as Australia dictated play in the final two minutes, Chris Johnson scoring twice to leave the match tied at 42-42, and the Australians ahead on aggregate 107-100. Australian keeper Andrew Kellaway was awarded the Jim Stynes Medal as Australia's best player of the series, a rare feat for any Australian keeper made all the more impressive by the fact that there is no such position in Australian rules football.

== Squads ==
Ireland

Seamus Moynihan (C), Joe Bergin, Graham Canty, Paddy Christie, Stephen Cluxton, Ray Cosgrove, Dessie Dolan, Graham Geraghty, Trevor Giles, Colin Holmes, Brendan Jer O'Sullivan, Pádraic Joyce, Evan Kelly, Tadhg Kennelly, Anthony Lynch, Declan Meehan, Cormac McAnallen, Kieran McGeeney, Ciaran McManus, Seamus Moynihan, Eamonn O'Hara, Darragh Ó Sé, Tomas Ó Sé, Derek Savage, Paul Barden

Australia

Shane Crawford (C), Mark Bickley, Craig Bradley, Nathan Brown, Cameron Bruce, James Clement, Chad Cornes, Luke Darcy, Tyson Edwards, Josh Francou, Chris Johnson, Chris Judd, Andrew Kellaway (GK), Daniel Kerr, Angelo Lekkas, Stephen Milne, Brett Montgomery, Robert Murphy, Matthew Scarlett, Brad Scott, Adam Yze, Adam Simpson, Warren Tredrea ||| Australian Manager: Garry Lyon

== Match results ==
=== First Test (14 October) ===
Team	1	2	3	4	Total
(Republic of Ireland) Ireland	0.6.3 (21)	0.11.5 (38)	0.12.9 (45)	1.14.10	(58)
Australia	0.3.1 (10)	0.5.4 (19)	1.10.7 (43)	2.15.8	(65)
Australia win by 7 points

Date	Sunday, 13 October 2002
Scoring (IRL)	Goals: Dolan Overs: Kennelly 3, Dolan 2, Jer O'Sullivan 2, Joyce 2, Cosgrove, Geraghty, D. O'Se, Savage
Scoring (AUS)	Goals: Kerr, Pavlich Overs: Brown 5, Pavlich 3, Johnson 2, Yze 2, Darcy, Judd, Kerr
Best	IRL: Kennelly, Burke, Jer O'Sullivan, Dolan, Joyce, D. O'Se; AUS: Pavlich, Kellaway, Brown, Johnson, Bradley, Kerr
Injuries	IRL: Nil; AUS: Nil
Venue	Croke Park, Dublin, County Dublin
Attendance	44,221
Umpires	Brian White (Ireland); Scott McLaren (Australia)

=== Second Test (21 October) ===
Team	1	2	3	4	Total
(Republic of Ireland) Ireland	0.3.3 (12)	0.4.5 (17)	1.7.10 (37)	1.8.12	(42)
Australia	0.1.1 (4)	0.5.3 (18)	0.5.3 (18)	1.11.3	(42)
Draw (Australia win by 7 points on aggregate)

Date	Sunday, 20 October 2002
Scoring (IRL)	Goals: McAnallen Overs: Dolan 2, O'Hara 2, Geraghty, Joyce, McManus, Savage
Scoring (AUS)	Goals: Darcy Overs: Brown 4, Johnson 3, Francou, Judd, Milne, Murphy
Best	IRL: Giles, Cluxton, Moynihan, Kennelly, Geraghty; AUS: Simpson, Brown, Clement, Kellaway, Johnson
Injuries	IRL: Nil; AUS: Nil
Venue	Croke Park, Dublin, County Dublin
Attendance	71,544
Umpires	Brian White (Ireland); Scott McLaren (Australia)

== See also ==
- International rules football
- Gaelic football
- Australian rules football
- Relationship between Gaelic football and Australian rules football
