= 2000 International Rules Series =

- Event: International Rules Series
Ireland	Australia
98	123
- 123–98 on aggregate, Australia win series 2–0

First Test
Ireland	Australia
47	55
- Date: 8 October 2000
- Venue: Croke Park, Dublin, County Dublin
- Referee: Pat McEnaney (Ireland); Brett Allen (Australia)
- Attendance: 38,016

Second Test
Australia	Ireland
68	51
- Date: 15 October 2000
- Venue: Croke Park, Dublin, County Dublin
- Referee: Pat McEnaney (Ireland); Brett Allen (Australia)
- Attendance: 57,289

The 2000 International Rules Series was the seventh annual International Rules Series and the third time that a Test series of international rules football has been played between Ireland and Australia since the series resumed in 1998.

The series was played in Ireland over two Test matches and was won by Australia, who recorded a clean sweep by winning both Test matches and defeating the host nation on an aggregate margin of 123–98 points. The win was Australia's first since the series recommenced under the two Test format in 1998 and was notable for the fact that it produced a then record crowd for a home international for any Irish team, in the second Test.

== Series overview ==
Coming into the series, Ireland were defending champions and had won both of the series' played in 1998 and 1999. Captained by James Hird, however, the Australian side scored a memorable win in the first Test match, coming from 9 points down at half time and 6 points down at three quarter time, despite the fact the only goal of the match came from the home side's Graham Geraghty in the second quarter. Despite Ireland maintaining its advantage of 5–15 points for much of the match, as the Irish publication Hogan Stand wrote, "the homesters visibly tired [and]...Australia proceeded to add 14 points in a charge for the finishing line. In contrast, Ireland could only manage just one point."

The second Test was dominated by Australia, with Sydney Swans forward Michael O'Loughlin scoring 17 points in a dominant display up forward. The Australians "swamped" Ireland in the first quarter, taking a 20–6 lead at quarter time, before O'Loughlin and Justin Leppitsch each scored goals in the second quarter to extend Australia's lead to a whopping 28 points at half time. To their credit, Ireland clawed back to 14 points down eight minutes into the last quarter, through two overs to Dermot Earley and one to Seamus Moynihan. But Australia had enough fitness on their side to see out the win, thanks to late overs to Blake Caracella and Adam Yze, who kicked three overs apiece for the match.

Essendon premiership captain and Australian captain James Hird was awarded the Jim Stynes Medal as best afield throughout the series. Hird was named amongst the best players both matches and he remains the only Australian player in AFL history to lead a team to both premiership and national success in the one year.

== Squads ==
Source: Footy Stats

=== Ireland squad ===
Cormac Sullivan, Finbar Cullen, Darren Fay, Sean Marty Lockhart
Sean Og de Paor, Eoin Sexton, Anthony Rainbow, Seamus Moynihan
Anthony Tohill, Paidraig Joyce, Trevor Giles (C), Dermot Earley, Larry Reilly
Graham Geraghty, Peter Canavan, Gerard Cavlan, Mark Crossan
Eoin Gormley, Kieran McGeeney, Paul McGrane, Ciaran McManus, Brian Stynes

=== Australian squad ===
Jason Akermanis, Justin Blumfield, Craig Bradley, Nathan Brown, Wayne Campbell,
Blake Caracella, Trent Croad, Simon Goodwin, Damien Hardwick, Brent Harvey,
Chris Heffernan, James Hird (C), Brad Johnson, Andrew Kellaway (GK), David King,
Steven King, Justin Leppitsch, Andrew McLeod, Michael O'Loughlin, Luke Power,
Brett Ratten, Mark Ricciuto, Rohan H. Smith, Scott West, Shane Woewodin, Adem Yze

== Matches ==
=== First Test (8 October) ===
Team	1	2	3	4	Total
(Republic of Ireland) Ireland	0.4.0 (12)	0.8.4 (28)	1.10.4 (40)	1.11.8	(47)
Australia	0.2.1 (7)	0.5.4 (19)	0.9.7 (34)	0.14.13	(55)
Australia win by 8 points

Date	Sunday, 8 October 2000
Scoring (IRL)	Goals: Geraghty Overs: Earley 2, B. Stynes 2, Calvan 2, Reilly, Geraghty, Canavan, Moran, Rainbow
Scoring (AUS)	Goals: Nil Overs: Leppitsch 4, Caracella 4, Harvey, Hird, Blumfield, Smith, Brown, Croad
Best	IRL: Cullen, Lockhart, Geraghty, Sullivan, Ryan; AUS: Leppitsch, Caracella, Akermanis, Harvey, Campbell, Hird
Injuries	IRL: Nil; AUS: Nil
Venue	Croke Park, Dublin, County Dublin
Attendance	38,016
Umpires	Pat McEnaney (Ireland); Brett Allen (Australia)

=== Second Test (15 October) ===
Team	1	2	3	4	Total
(Republic of Ireland) Ireland	0.2.0 (6)	1.4.1 (19)	1.8.5 (35)	1.12.9	(51)
Australia	0.5.5 (20)	2.10.5 (47)	2.12.8 (56)	2.15.11	(68)
Australia win by 17 points (25 points on aggregate)

Date	Sunday, 15 October 2000
Scoring (IRL)	Goals: Gormley Overs: Earley 4, B. Stynes 2, McManus, Rainbow, Cullen, Tohill, Geraghty, Giles
Scoring (AUS)	Goals: O'Loughlin, Leppitsch Overs: O'Loughlin 3, Caracella 3, Yze 3, Leppitsch, McLeod, Riccuito, Power, West, Croad
Best	IRL: Earley, Moynihan, Giles, Fay, Gormley, Sullivan; AUS: O'Loughlin, Bradley, Leppitsch, Hird, Caracella, Hardwick
Injuries	IRL: Nil; AUS: Nil
Venue	Croke Park, Dublin, County Dublin
Attendance	57,289
Umpires	Pat McEnaney (Ireland); Brett Allen (Australia)

== See also ==
- International rules football
- Gaelic football
- Australian rules football
- Relationship between Gaelic football and Australian rules football
