= 2014 Leinster Senior Football Championship =

The 2014 Leinster Senior Football Championship was that year's installment of the annual Leinster Senior Football Championship held under the auspices of Leinster GAA. It was one of the four provincial competitions of the 2014 All-Ireland Senior Football Championship. Dublin entered the competition as defending Leinster champions and ended it the same way.

The draw was made on 3 October 2013.

== Teams ==
The Leinster championship was contested by 11 of the 12 county teams in Leinster, a province of Ireland. Kilkenny was the only county team not to compete.

| Team | Colours | Sponsor | Manager | Captain | Most recent success |
| Team | Colours | Sponsor | Manager | Captain | All-Ireland | Provincial |
|---|---|---|---|---|---|---|
| Carlow | Red, green and gold | Dan Morrissey Irl. Ltd. | Anthony Rainbow | Brendan Kavanagh | | 1944 |
| Dublin | Sky blue and navy | American International Group | Jim Gavin | Stephen Cluxton | 2013 | 2013 |
| Kildare | White | Brady Family Ham | Jason Ryan | Eamonn Callaghan | 1928 | 2000 |
| Laois | Blue and white | MW Hire Services | Tomás Ó Flatharta | Ross Munnelly | | 2003 |
| Longford | Royal blue and gold | Glennon Brothers | Jack Sheedy | Dermot Brady | | 1968 |
| Louth | Red and white | Morgan Fuels | Aidan O'Rourke | Paddy Keenan | 1957 | 1957 |
| Meath | Green and gold | Tayto Park | Mick O'Dowd | Kevin Reilly | 1999 | 2010 |
| Offaly | White, green and gold | Carroll Cuisine | Emmet McDonnell | Niall McNamee | 1982 | 1997 |
| Westmeath | Maroon and white | Renault | Paul Bealin | Paul Sharry | | 2004 |
| Wexford | Purple and gold | Gain Feeds | Aidan O'Brien | Graeme Molloy | 1918 | 1945 |
| Wicklow | Blue and gold | Brennan Hotels | Harry Murphy | Leighton Glynn |

== Bracket ==
Preliminary round
Wicklow | 1-11
Laois | 0-21
Longford | 0-19
Offaly | 0-15
Westmeath | 1-09
Louth | 1-14

Quarter-finals
Laois | 0-16
Dublin | 2-21
Longford | 1-13
Wexford | 1-15
Louth | 1-07
Kildare | 1-22
Carlow | 0-06
Meath | 7-13

Semi-finals
Dublin | 2-25
Wexford | 1-12
Kildare | 0-17
Meath | 2-16

Final
Dublin | 3-20
Meath | 1-10

== Fixtures ==
=== Preliminary round ===
17 May 2014
7.00pm
Preliminary round

| Westmeath | 1-09 – 1-14 | Louth |
|---|---|---|
| K Martin (1-01), J Heslin (0-03), G Egan (0-02), J Dolan, D Glennon, D Dolan (0-1 each) | Report | D Maguire (0-05), R Burns (1-00), D Byrne, P Keenan (0-03 each), A McDonnell (0-02), S Lennon (0-01) |

Cusack Park, Mullingar
Attendance: 4,500
Referee: Maurice Deegan (Laois)

18 May 2014
3.30pm
Preliminary round

| Wicklow | 1-11 – 0-21 | Laois |
|---|---|---|
| P Cunningham (1-00), S Furlong (0-04), R Finn, L Glynn (0-03 each), C McGraynor (0-01) | Report | R Munnelly (0-09), D Kingston (0-06), J O’Loughlin (0-03), D Strong (0-02), K Meaney (0-01) |

Aughrim County Ground, Aughrim
Attendance: 3,200
Referee: R. Hickey (Clare)

18 May 2014
3.30pm
Preliminary round

| Longford | 0-19 – 0-15 | Offaly |
|---|---|---|
| S McCormack (0-07), B Kavanagh, F McGee (0-03 each), M Hughes, P Barden (0-02 each), M Quinn, S Mulligan (0-01 each) | Report | N McNamee (0-07), P Cunningham, J Maher, G Guilfoyle (0-02 each), R Allen, C Hurley (0-01 each) |

Pearse Park, Longford
Attendance: 2,700
Referee: M. Higgins (Fermanagh)

=== Quarter-finals ===
7 June 2014
7.00pm
Quarter-final

| Longford | 1-13 – 1-15 | Wexford |
|---|---|---|
| S McCormack (0-05), P F McGee (1-01), Barden (0-03), B Kavanagh (0-02), E Williams, M Quinn (0-01 each) | Report | C Lyng (1-05), B Brosnan (0-03), R Dempsey (0-02), B Malone, A Flynn, D Waters, PJ Banville, M O'Regan (0-01 each) |

Pearse Park, Longford
Referee: David Gough (Meath)

8 June 2014
2.00pm
Quarter-final

| Louth | 1-07 – 1-22 | Kildare |
|---|---|---|
| S Lennon (1-02), P Keenan (0-03), J O'Brien, C Grimes (0-01 each) | Report | C McNally (1-02), N Kelly, E Bolton, P Brophy, P Fogarty (0-03 each), A Smith (0-02), K Cribbin, O Lyons, P O'Neill, E Callaghan, T Moolick, E O'Flaherty (0-01 each) |

Croke Park, Dublin
Referee: Barry Cassidy (Derry)

8 June 2014
4.00pm
Quarter-final

| Dublin | 2-21 – 0-16 | Laois |
|---|---|---|
| Diarmuid Connolly 1-1, Michael Darragh MacAuley 1-0, Paul Flynn, Cormac Costello, Dean Rock (0-3f) 0-3 each, Stephen Cluxton (2 '45) and Kevin McManamon 0-2 each, James McCarthy, Cian O'Sullivan, Paddy Andrews, Alan Brogan, Eoghan O'Gara, Bernard Brogan (0-1f), Bryan Cullen 0-1 each | Report | Ross Munnelly 0-7 (0-2f), Donal Kingston 0-3 (0-2f), Darren Strong 0-2, John O'Loughlin, James Finn, David Conway, Niall Donoher 0-1 each |

Croke Park, Dublin
Attendance: 40,960
Referee: P Hughes (Armagh)
15 June 2014
3.30pm
Quarter-final

| Carlow | 0-06 – 7-13 | Meath |
|---|---|---|
| P Broderick (0-05), S Kinsella (0-01) | Report | M Newman (3-02), A Tormey (1-03), B McMahon (1-01), S Bray, D McDonagh (1-00 each), S Kenny, S O’Rourke (0-02 each), D Carroll, D Tobin, M O’Sullivan (0-01 each) |

Dr. Cullen Park, Carlow
Referee: P O'Sullivan (Kerry)

=== Semi-finals ===
29 June 2014
2.00pm
Semi-final

| Kildare | 0-17 – 2-16 | Meath |
|---|---|---|
| P Fogarty (0-06), P O' Neill, E Callaghan (0-03 each), T Moolick, A Smith (0-02 each), N Kelly (0-01) | Report | A Tormey (1-04), S Bray (0-04), D McDonagh (1-00), D Carroll, P O'Rourke (0-02 each), S O’Rourke, G Reilly, J Wallace, D Bray (0-01 each) |

Croke Park, Dublin
Referee: R Hickey (Clare)

29 June 2014
4:00pm
Semi-final

| Dublin | 2-25 – 1-12 | Wexford |
|---|---|---|
| Cormac Costello 1-5 (0-2f), Paul Flynn 1-2, Dean Rock 0-4f, Paul Mannion 0-3, Diarmuid Conolly (0-1f), Eoghan O'Gara, Tomás Brady 0-2 each, Stephen Cluxton (1 '45), Philly McMahon, Nicky Devereux, Michael Darragh McCauley, Alan Brogan 0-1 each | Report | Ben Brosnan 0-6 (0-3f), Daithi Waters 1-0, PJ Banville 0-3, James Holmes, Ciaran Lyng (0-1f), Kevin O'Grady 0-1 each |

Croke Park, Dublin
Attendance: 46,279
Referee: Ciaran Branagan (Down)

=== Final ===
| 20 July 2014; 2:00 pm Final | Dublin | 3-20 – 1-10 | Meath | Croke Park, Dublin; Attendance: 62,660; Referee: Padraig Hughes (Armagh); Man of the Match: Kevin McManamon |
| 20 July 2014; 2:00 pm Final | Bernard Brogan 1-6 (0-4f), Kevin McManamon 1-5, Eoghan O’Gara 1-1, Stephen Cluxton (1 '45), Jack McCaffrey, Cian O’Sullivan, Paul Flynn, Alan Brogan, Diarmuid Connolly, Cormac Costello, Dean Rock 0-1 each | Report | Michael Newman 1-2 (0-1f), Shane O’Rourke (0-2f), Andrew Tormey, Stephen Bray 0-2 each, Damien Carroll and David Bray 0-1 each | Croke Park, Dublin; Attendance: 62,660; Referee: Padraig Hughes (Armagh); Man of the Match: Kevin McManamon |

== See also ==
- Fixtures and results
- 2014 All-Ireland Senior Football Championship
  - 2014 Connacht Senior Football Championship
  - 2014 Munster Senior Football Championship
  - 2014 Ulster Senior Football Championship
