= Seamus Moynihan =

Kerry Gaelic footballer

Personal information
- Native name: Séamus Ó Muíneacháin (Irish)
- Nickname: Pony
- Born: 22 October 1973 (age 53) County Kerry
- Height: 5 ft 11 in (180 cm)

Sport
- Sport: Gaelic football
- Position: Centre Back
Club
- Years: Club
- 1980–2011: Glenflesk
Club titles
- Kerry titles: 3
College(s)
- Years: College
- UCC; IT Tralee
College titles
- Sigerson titles: 4
Inter-county
Years	County	Apps (scores)
1992–2006	Kerry	61 (0–5)
Inter-county titles
- Munster titles: 8
- All-Irelands: 4
- All Stars: 3

Séamus Moynihan is an Irish former Gaelic footballer from Shronedarraugh, a townland halfway between Barraduff and Glenflesk, County Kerry. He has played football for St Brendan's College, Glenflesk, East Kerry, University College Cork, Institute of Technology Tralee, Kerry Minor, U21 and Senior teams, Munster Railway Cup side and the Ireland international rules football team. He was a member of the Kerry Senior Football Panel from 1992 to 2006. He resides in Shronedarraugh with his wife Noreen, son Jamie and two daughters Clíona and Eve.

== Early life ==
As an underage player, Moynihan idolised the style of Kerry All-Star forward John Egan and played for his local GAA club Glenflesk, secondary school team St Brendan's College, Killarney, and Kerry Minors and U21s. Moynihan's first inter-county success arrived at the age of 16 when he was part of the Kerry Minor team that claimed the Munster crown in 1990. 1992 was a pivotal year for Moynihan, when he lined out for the St Brendan's team that beat St Jarlath's College of Tuam to win the Hogan Cup in the All-Ireland Colleges Final and was also noticed on the Kerry U21 team that won out in Munster. It was about this time that Mickey 'Ned' O'Sullivan, former Kerry captain and later manager of the Limerick senior football team, began to talk to people about Moynihan's potential. Séamus Moynihan, aged just 18, made his senior debut at midfield for Kerry in the Munster Final, replacing Gneeveguilla veteran Ambrose O'Donovan. Playing alongside the likes of Kerry forward Eoin 'Bomber' Liston and midfield colossus Jack O'Shea, Kerry lost to a steely Clare side on a score of 2–10 to 0–12. It was O'Sullivan's last game in charge of the Kerry senior side.

== Formative career: 1992–1996 ==
During the 1992 and 1993 campaigns, Moynihan was tried at half back, midfield and half forward before settling into the half back line. The next 3 championship seasons were unsettling from a Kerry viewpoint as 3 straight defeats by Cork in the 1993, 1994 and 1995 Munster Finals saw the Kerry seniors eyeballing a 10-year low. Despite this disappointing level of achievement at inter-county level, Séamus Moynihan was beginning a strong run of success at Sigerson Cup level, playing for U.C.C. in the 1994 and 1995 finals; then returning 2 years later in 1997 and 1998 whilst studying for a master's degree at IT Tralee to collect more winner's medals.

== Retirement and plaudits ==
Moynihan announced his retirement from inter-county football on Saturday, 23 September 2006 through an article in The Irish Times. On the following Monday, Kerry team manager Jack O'Connor hailed Moynihan as "a one-off player" and said Kerry football would never see his like again. He also stated that Séamus was an inspiration to the entire Kerry team, particularly the younger players and that he would be missed. Announcing his decision to quit lining out for Kerry, Moynihan said: "All good things come to an end." On 18 December 2011, Séamus announced his retirement from club football after over 20 years of service for the Glenflesk senior football team.

== Honours ==
Moynihan won four All-Ireland medals, three National Leagues, nine Munster championship medals, four Sigerson Cup medals, three GAA All-Stars, one Railway Cup medal and one Division 2 title. He also won three county championship medals with East Kerry and captained his country in the International Rules series.

In May 2020, a public poll conducted by RTÉ.ie named Moynihan in the full-back line alongside Páidi and Marc Ó Sé in a team of footballers who had won All Stars during the era of The Sunday Game.

Also in May 2020, the Irish Independent named Moynihan at number fifteen in its "Top 20 footballers in Ireland over the past 50 years".

Awards and achievements
Preceded by Graham Geraghty (Meath)	All-Ireland SFC winning captain 2000	Succeeded by Gary Fahey (Galway)
Preceded by Mike Frank Russell (Kerry) (Drawn Game)	All-Ireland Senior Football Final; Man of the Match; 2000 (Replay)	Succeeded by Pádraic Joyce (Galway)
Preceded by Trevor Giles	All Stars Footballer of the Year; 2000	Succeeded by Declan Meehan
Sporting positions
Preceded by Anthony Tohill	Ireland International Rules Captain; 2002	Succeeded by Graham Canty
