= Quane =

Quane is a surname. Notable people with the surname include:

- Adam Quane, American musician
- John Quane, Irish Gaelic footballer
- Michael Quane (born 1962), Irish sculptor
- Mick Quane (born 1934), Irish hurler
