= Pat McEnaney =

Irish Gaelic footballer and referee

Personal information
- Born: 1960/1961/1962/1963
- Education: Referagh School
- Occupation: Salesman
- Employer: GAA
- Other interests: Squash

Sport
- Sport: Gaelic football
- Position: Referee
- Club: Corduff

Pat McEnaney (born c. 1960/1961/1962/1963) is a Gaelic footballer and referee from Corduff in County Monaghan. He officiated many high-profile inter-county matches, including four finals of the All-Ireland SFC. Many would rate McEnaney as the best Gaelic football referee of his time. As of 2022, he was continuing to referee. That year, Martin Breheny named him among "five of the best football referees".

McEnaney also refereed several International Rules Series tests, as well as games in countries such as France, Luxembourg and the United States.

== Early and personal life ==
McEnaney attended Referagh School. He plays squash. His brother Séamus is a manager.

== Playing career ==
As a player, McEnaney won a Monaghan Junior Football Championship and a Monaghan Intermediate Football Championship with Corduff in 1998. McEnaney still plays at Junior "B" level for Corduff. He described his "first priority" as "probably playing club football"; refereeing at inter-county level followed on from this. He played for Corduff until he was 38 years of age.

== Refereeing career ==
McEnaney first took up refereeing when he was 21 years of age, after damaging his left knee while playing association football for Carrick Rovers (from nearby Carrickmacross).

Páraic Duffy, a figure within Monaghan GAA refereeing back then, invited McEnaney to officiate at some matches "because I could run in straight lines!", McEnaney later said. Finding that he enjoyed it, McEnaney kept going and progressed up the ranks. He trained every second night during his refereeing career.

=== Inter-county ===
McEnaney refereed the 1996 All-Ireland Senior Football Championship final between Mayo and Meath and — even by his own admission — "became famous for all the wrong reasons". This was due to a mass brawl between both teams on the pitch. McEnaney sought to punish those he deemed the worst offenders. He decided he would send off Mayo's Liam McHale and Meath's John McDermott. "When it all settled down my gut instinct was to send off McDermott with McHale. I had my mind made up on that", McEnaney later said. Then he consulted with umpire Francie McMahon, who had witnessed something dreadful. "Pat," he said. "You're going to have to send off Colm Coyle. He's after dropping about six of them". One of the linesmen, Kevin Walsh, intervened to also highlight Coyle's indiscretions. McEnaney sent off McHale and Coyle. McHale has never claimed not to have been involved in the brawl that day; indeed, he is on record as saying: "I was right in the middle right from the start". Coyle had arrived later. Inaccurate stories spread afterwards that McEnaney had received hate mail at his home, but, McEnaney later said, the only letter he received (from a Meath supporter) praised McEnaney for how he had handled the brawl. McHale and McEnaney had not spoken, as of 2009.

McEnaney's father died that November. His efforts at overcoming the events of 1996 were rewarded when he was given the task of refereeing the 2000 All-Ireland Senior Football Championship final between Galway and Kerry. He was a lot happier with how that game went. That game also went to a replay, but a change of GAA policy (which McEnaney agreed with) meant he did not have to oversee that replay, which was given to Brian White instead.

McEnaney also refereed the 2004 All-Ireland Senior Football Championship final, which incidentally also involved Mayo.

After refereeing one All-Ireland final (2000?), he went to Crossmaglen to officiate "at a tournament game, I think". The announcer informed the large crowd gathered: "We would like to welcome referee Pat McEnaney who refereed last Sunday's All-Ireland". McEnaney received a round of applause: "I couldn't believe it. That was my one and only time".

McEnaney continued to feature on the inter-county referees' panel until the conclusion of the 2011 championship.

=== International ===
McEnaney refereed the first test of the 2006 International Rules Series at Pearse Stadium in Galway, having previously refereed earlier editions of the competition.

He refereed games outside Ireland, including in Paris, Luxembourg, New York, San Francisco and Australia.

== Administration career ==
When Liam O'Neill was president of the GAA, McEnaney chaired the National Referees' Committee and he oversaw the introduction of the amended square-ball rule, the black card and Hawk-Eye. As of 2022, he continued to support Hawk-Eye and the black card.

McEnaney has also acted as a spokesperson for the GAA, such as in the aftermath of the Armagh eye-gouging incident in 2022. McEnaney criticised Armagh following this game: "Armagh needs to lose their tag, and that image they have. You can be unfortunate and you can be unlucky. But it needs to stop."
