= Odhran O'Dwyer =

Clare Gaelic footballer

Personal information
- Born: County Clare, Ireland

Sport
- Sport: Gaelic football
- Position: -Center forward
Club
- Years: Club
- Kilmurry Ibrickane
Club titles
- Clare titles: 7
- Munster titles: 2
Inter-county
- Years: County
- Clare
Inter-county titles
- Munster titles: 1
- All Stars: 0

Odhran O'Dwyer is a Gaelic footballer from County Clare. He played at senior level for the Clare county team and won a Tommy Murphy Cup in 2004. He also played for Ireland in the 2003 International Rules Series.

At club level, he played with Kilmurry Ibrickane. He won Clare Senior Football Championship in 1993, 2002, 2004, 2008, 2009 and 2011, 2012, and he also won two Munster Senior Club Football Championship and played in the 2010 All-Ireland Club Championship final. His son is an upcoming talent in Kilmurry Ibrickane.
