= Ray Cosgrove =

Dublin Gaelic footballer

Personal information
- Native name: Réamann Mac Oscair (Irish)
- Nickname: Cossy
- Born: Dublin, Ireland

Sport
- Sport: Gaelic football
- Position: Right corner-forward
Clubs
- Years: Club
- 19xx- (present): Leicester Celtic (soccer); Kilmacud Crokes
Club titles
- Dublin titles: 5
- Leinster titles: 3
- All-Ireland Titles: 1
Inter-county
- Years: County
- 1996–2008: Dublin
Inter-county titles
- Leinster titles: 4

Ray "Cossy" Cosgrove is an Irish Gaelic footballer, born in Dublin. He attended St. Benildus College in Kilmacud. He plays his club football for Kilmacud Crokes and played for the Dublin senior football team between 1996 and 2008. He will be most remembered for his incredible performances in the 2002 scoring an amazing 6–23 in a season which saw Dublin lift their first Leinster title since 1995.

== Playing career ==
=== Kilmacud Crokes ===
At club level, Cosgrove's performance were at a high level. In 2002 when he won the 2002 Adult FL Division 1 title with Kilmacud Crokes, although he received a red card 12 minutes into the second half. This incident did not affect the score, and Kilmacud Crokes turned out winners against a resilient Ballyboden St Enda's side.

Cosgrove was also part of Kilmacuds team in 2004 when they won the Dublin Senior Club Football Championship and 2005 when they also won the Leinster Senior Club Football Championship. He was man of the match in the 2005 county final scoring 0–5 from play and scored 1–10 in the first round of the Leinster Club Championship against St. Peters Dunboyne in Navan. He received the 2005 award for AIB Leinster player of the year. Cosgrove won his first Dublin Senior Championship in 1998 and also won championships in 2008 Oliver Plunketts. He was a member of the team that won the All Ireland Club Championship in March 2009 when they beat Crossmaglen Ranger. He won his 5th Dublin Senior Club championship in 2010.

=== Dublin ===
Cosgrove got his first chance for Dublin in the 1999 Leinster final. Unfortunately, having been brought on as a sub, he was substituted himself soon after. He did not get another game until 2002, when fellow clubman Tommy Lyons took over as manager.

Cosgrove started at full forward in the Leinster quarter-final of 2002 against Wexford. In the semi-final against Meath, he scored 2–3 while being marked by Darren Fay. Dublin recorded their first victory over Meath in 7 years and reached the Leinster final where they beat Kildare to win their first Leinster championship since 1995.

Cosgrove also scored 3 goals against Donegal in the All-Ireland quarter final that went to a replay. Dublin got knocked out in the semi-final to eventual All-Ireland final winners, Armagh. In that game, Dublin were one point down when they won a free kick deep in injury time. Cosgrove elected to kick the ball from his hands, rather than off the ground, and hit the post. He scored 0–6 in that match and won his second RTÉ Man of the Match award of 2002 following on from the one against Meath. His performances won him the Vodafone Footballer of the Month for August, awarded for his individual performances that month.

Cosgrove was rewarded with his performances with a place on the 2002 All Star team at full forward. The total of 6–23 meriting him Top Scorer in the Championship having played 6 games. He was awarded The Daily Star newspaper GAA Sports Personality of the Year for 2002. He also played in the International rules football tour of Autumn 2002.

He was Dublin's top scorer gain in 2003, when he won his second Leinster medal.

Cosgrove made his first Championship start with Dublin for three years on 25 June 2006 against Laois in the Leinster Senior Football Championship Semi-final. He scored a total of 1–03 and received the RTÉ Man of the Match Award for his performance. His form in the final against Offaly did not reach expectations and although he started brightly against Westmeath, scoring a point, he tired in the second half and he was eventually replaced. Cosgrove made a similarly bright start against Mayo, this time scoring two points. When he was replaced Dublin led by 7 points.

In May 2008 Cosgrove retired from inter-county football.

== National League appearances ==
#	Date	Venue	Opponent	Score	Result	Competition
1	10 February 2002	Parnell Park, Dublin	Donegal	0–3	2–10 : 0–14	National Football League Round 1
2	17 February 2002	Healy Park, Omagh	Tyrone	1–3	2–10 : 0–18	National Football League Round 2
3	23 February 2002	O'Connor Park, Tullamore	Offaly	0–3	0–10 : 1–7	National Football League Round 3
4	3 March 2002	Parnell Park, Dublin	Westmeath	0–5	3–13 : 1–16	National Football League Round 4
5	10 March 2002	Páirc Uí Chaoimh, Cork	Cork	0–2	0–10 : 1–13	National Football League Round 5
6	24 March 2002	Parnell Park, Dublin	Roscommon	0–8	0–16 : 2–12	National Football League Round 6
7	31 March 2002	Tuam Stadium, Tuam	Galway	1–4	1–12 : 1–12	National Football League Round 7
8	2 March 2003	Fitzgerald Stadium, Killarney	Kerry	0–2	0–14 : 2–11	National Football League Round 4
9	9 March 2003	Parnell Park, Dublin	Cork	0–2	0–8 : 0–16	National Football League Round 5
10	23 March 2003	Dr Hyde Park, Roscommon	Roscommon	0–1	0–17 : 0–14	National Football League Round 6
11	6 April 2003	Parnell Park, Dublin	Galway	–	0–12 : 1–9	National Football League Round 7
