= Darren Hughes (Gaelic footballer) =

Monaghan Gaelic footballer

Personal information
- Born: Scotstown, Ireland
- Height: 1.85 m (6 ft 1 in)

Sport
- Sport: Gaelic Football
- Position: Midfield
Club
- Years: Club
- Scotstown
Club titles
- Monaghan titles: 5
Inter-county
- Years: County
- 2006–: Monaghan
Inter-county titles
- Ulster titles: 2
- All-Irelands: 0
- NFL: 2
- All Stars: 0

Darren Hughes is a Gaelic football player from County Monaghan, Ireland. He plays at senior level for the Monaghan county team.

In 2011, Hughes was part of the Ireland team that won the 2011 International Rules Series against Australia by 130 to 65.

== Honours ==
- Ulster Senior Football Championship (2): 2013, 2015
- National Football League, Division 2 (1): 2014
- National Football League, Division 3 (1): 2013
