= Anthony Lynch (Gaelic footballer) =

Irish Gaelic footballer

Personal information
- Native name: Antóin Ó Loingsigh (Irish)
- Nickname: The Pride
- Born: 21 August 1977 (age 49) Ballyvourney, County Cork

Sport
- Sport: Gaelic Football
- Position: Left Corner Back
Club
- Years: Club
- 1996–: Naomh Abán
Inter-county
Years	County	Apps (scores)
1999–2011	Cork	45 (0–5)
Inter-county titles
- Munster titles: 5 (1 as sub)
- All-Irelands: 1
- NFL: 3
- All Stars: 2

Anthony Lynch (born 21 August 1977 in Ballyvourney, County Cork) is an Irish sportsperson. He plays Gaelic football with his local club Naomh Abán and was a member of the Cork senior inter-county team from 1999 to 2011.

== Playing career ==
=== Club ===
Lynch plays his club football with his local club called Naomh Abán in Ballyvourney.

Lynch first came to prominence as a member of the club's underage teams. After the minor grade, he quickly joined the under-21 team. In 1995 Naomh Abán won their divisional championship and subsequently reached the final of the county under-21 championship. The opponents on that occasion were Mallow and a close game developed. At the full-time whistle the victory went to Mallow, as their ability to score goals clinched a 2–9 to 0–12 win.

Lynch subsequently joined the Naomh Abán intermediate football team. In 1999 the club reached the final of the county intermediate championship, with Castletownbere providing the opposition. A close game developed between these two sides, however, at the full-time whistle the sides could not be separated and a draw was the result. The subsequent replay was also a close affair; however, it proved to be more conclusive. In the end victory went to Naomh Abán by 1–9 to 1–6 and Lynch collected a county intermediate championship winners' medal.

=== Inter-county ===
Lynch first came to prominence on the inter-county scene as a member of the Cork senior football team in the late 1990s. He made his debut in the 1998–99 National Football League, a season which saw Cork reach the final of the competition. Dublin provided the opposition at Cork's home venue, Páirc Uí Chaoimh. A close game developed, however, Cork were never really troubled. A 0–12 to 1–7 score line resulted in victory for 'the Rebels', and gave Lynch a National League winners' medal in his debut season. Later that year he made his championship debut in the provincial series as Cork cruised to a Munster final showdown with arch-rivals Kerry. The men from 'the Kingdom' were on the hunt for a fourth successive provincial title, while Cork were out for success for the first time since 1995. Cork's victory on a score line of 2–10 to 2–4 was unexpected as Lynch claimed his very first Munster winners' medal. A subsequent defeat of Mayo saw Cork book their place in the All-Ireland final against Meath. The pressure was on the Cork footballers to secure a rare double, particularly since their hurling counterparts had won the All-Ireland title a fortnight previously. Ollie Murphy's first-half goal gave 'the Royals' a huge boost at half-time. Immediately after the interval Trevor Giles missed a penalty while Joe Kavanagh responded with a goal which gave Cork a brief lead. It was not enough as Lynch's side eventually lost the game by 1–11 to 1–8. In spite of this defeat Lynch was later rewarded with an All-Star award.

After the highs of 1999, the following year proved disappointing as Cork exited the championship at a very early stage.

In 2001 Cork were back and Lynch lined out in his second provincial decider. Reigning All-Ireland champions Kerry were the opponents. The game was a reasonably close affair; however, 'the Kingdom' never looked like losing. At the full-time whistle Cork were defeated by 0–19 to 1–13. 2001 was the first year of the qualifier system so, in spite of being defeated, Cork had another chance to battle for the All-Ireland title. Lynch's side, however, were subsequently dumped out of the championship by eventual champions Galway.

2002 proved to be a more successful year for Lynch. After defeating Kerry in the provincial semi-final, Cork qualified for a Munster final showdown with Tipperary. While many people expected Cork to win the game easily, Tipp nearly sneaked a win, however, the provincial decider ended in a draw. The replay was an absolute rout. Cork won by a huge score line of 1–23 to 0–7, giving Lynch a second Munster winners' medal. Cork's next game was the All-Ireland semi-final where they met Kerry for the third time in the championship that year. Furthermore, it was the first-ever meeting of these two great rivals in Croke Park. While expectations were high the game turned into a rout as everything went Kerry's way. Talismanic forward Colin Corkery was red-carded as 'the Rebels' were humiliated by 3–19 to 2–7. 2002 ended with the Cork hurling team going on strike. In turn, the football team joined in a sympathy strike. The players, who had been seeking better conditions, refused to play or train with the county again until the dispute with the county board was resolved. After a protracted standoff, the players' grievances were eventually settled.

2003 was a difficult year as Cork surrendered their provincial crown at an early stage before later crashing out of the championship in the All-Ireland qualifiers.

In 2004 Lynch's side fared no better. After losing to Kerry in the Munster semi-final Cork were forced to manoeuvre through the All-Ireland qualifiers once again. An unconvincing victory over Clare was followed by a humiliating 0–18 to 0–12 defeat by Fermanagh and an end to Cork's championship ambitions.

By 2005 the Cork footballers had regrouped and reached the Munster final for the first time in three years. Once again Kerry, the reigning All-Ireland champions, provided the opposition. The game was a close affair, however, Lynch's side were narrowly defeated by just 1–11 to 0–11. This did not mean the end of Cork's All-Ireland campaign. After winning their next two games 'the Rebels' qualified for an All-Ireland semi-final meeting with Kerry. In an embarrassing game of football for Cork, Lynch's side were trounced by thirteen points on a score line of 1–19 to 0–9.

In 2006 Lynch's team reached the Munster final with Kerry lining out against them. That game ended in a 0–10 points apiece draw. The replay saw a much fresher Cork team surprisingly defeat Kerry by 1–12 to 0–9. James Masters proved the hero of the day, as he scored 1–7 of Cork's total. Lynch had secured a third Munster winners' medal. The quirks of the championship saw Cork face Kerry again in the subsequent All-Ireland semi-final for the third time in five seasons. In a similar pattern to previous encounters Cork failed to beat Kerry at Croke Park. A 0–16 to 0–10 resulted in Cork being knocked out of the championship.

In 2007 Cork were out to atone for their defeats by Kerry the previous year. Both sides met in the provincial decider for the third year in succession. Cork gave a good account of themselves, however, Kerry could not be beaten and Lynch's side went down on a 1–15 to 1–13 score line. Cork later did well in the All-Ireland series and finally qualified for the All-Ireland final after an eight-year absence. In a cruel twist of fate Kerry were the opponents and, in an even crueller twist, a late injury ruled Lynch out of a place on the starting fifteen. While the first half was played on an even keel, 'the Kingdom' ran riot in the second half and a rout ensued. Goalkeeper Alan Quirke came in for much criticism after conceding some easy goals. Lynch was sprung from the bench as a substitute, however, at the full-time whistle Cork were trounced by 3–13 to 1–9.

In 2008 Cork gained a modicum of revenge on Kerry when the sides met again in that year's Munster final. Kerry were cruising by eight points at the interval, however, Cork stormed back in the second-half. Kerry could only muster three points as Cork secured a remarkable 1–16 to 1–11 victory. It was Lynch's fourth Munster winners' medal. Both sides met again in the All-Ireland semi-final, however, after a thrilling draw and a replay Kerry were the team that advanced to the championship decider.

AT the start of 2009 Cork were earmarked as potential All-Ireland contenders. The team laid down their credentials at an early stage with a defeat of Monaghan to take the National League Division 2 title. After a subsequent defeat of Kerry in a replay of the Munster semi-final, Cork subsequently faced Limerick in the Munster final. Lynch was ruled out of that game through injury. Cork were the red-hot favourites going into the game, however, his loss on the field was felt as Limerick put Cork to the pin of their collars. After a slow start 'the Rebels' settled and eventually secured a narrow 2–6 to 0–11 victory. Lynch also missed Cork's subsequent All-Ireland quarter-final but looks set to return for a semi-final showdown with reigning champions Tyrone. In December 2011 Lynch retired from Inter-county football.

=== Inter-provincial ===
Lynch has also lined out with Munster in the inter-provincial series of games and has enjoyed some success. He first lined out with his province in 1999 when Munster qualified to play Connacht in the final. The game was a largely dull affair, with the southern province securing a 0–1 to 0–6 victory and a Railway Cup winners' medal for Lynch. It was the first of four consecutive call-ups to the Munster team, however, Lynch's province

=== International ===
Lynch has also been chosen for duty with the Ireland team in the International Rules Series against Australia. He first lined out for his country in the first test in 2002. Australia, however, narrowly won that game by 65 points to 58 points. The second test ended in a 42 points apiece draw. As a result of this Ireland lost by an aggregate score of 7 points.

Lynch's football prowess earned him a place on the Ireland team again in 2003. A close series of games developed once again. Australia won the first test by 10 points; however, Ireland narrowed the margin of victory to just 3 points for the second test a week later. A 101–94 aggregate score line gave Australia a second consecutive International Rules title.

After failing to make the squad in 2004, Lynch was included in the Ireland squad that travelled to Australia for the International Rules series the following year. It was a disappointing two-game series as Ireland were trounced in both tests. A 163–106 aggregate score line resulted in a defeat for Lynch's Ireland side.

== Honours ==
=== Naomh Abán ===
- Cork Intermediate Football Championship:
  - Winner (1): 1999

=== Cork ===
- Munster Senior Football Championship:
  - Winner (5): 1999, 2002, 2006, 2008, 2009 (sub)
  - Runner-up (3): 2001, 2005, 2007
- National Football League (Div 1):
  - Winner (1): 1998–99
- National Football League (Div 2):
  - Winner (1): 2009

=== Munster ===
- Railway Cup:
  - Winner (1): 1999
