= Brendan Jer O'Sullivan =

Irish Gaelic footballer

Personal information
- Native name: Breandán Diarmuid Ó Súilleabháin (Irish)
- Born: 1979 (age 46–47) Adrigole, County Cork, Ireland
- Occupation: Secondary school teacher

Sport
- Sport: Gaelic football
- Position: Right wing-forward
Clubs
- Years: Club
- Adrigole → Beara
Club titles
- Cork titles: 1
Inter-county*
Years	County	Apps (scores)
1999-2005	Cork	19 (4-24)
Inter-county titles
- Munster titles: 2
- All-Irelands: 0
- NFL: 1
- All Stars: 0
- *Inter County team apps and scores correct as of 22:15, 15 April 2021.

Brendan Jeremiah O'Sullivan (born 1979) is an Irish former Gaelic footballer. He played for club side Adrigole, divisional side Beara and at inter-county level with the Cork senior football team.

== Honours ==
Adrigole

- Cork Junior Football Championship: 2006
- Beara Junior Football Championship: 1998, 1999, 2000, 2001, 2002, 2004, 2005, 2006

Beara

- Cork Senior Football Championship: 1997

Cork

- Munster Senior Football Championship: 1999, 2002
- National Football League: 1998–99
