= Ross Munnelly =

Irish Gaelic footballer

Personal information
- Native name: Ross Ó Maonaile (Irish)
- Born: 23 December 1982 (age 43) Portlaoise, Ireland
- Height: 1.75 m (5 ft 9 in)

Sport
- Sport: Gaelic Football
- Position: Right half forward
Club
- Years: Club
- 2003-: Arles–Kilcruise
Club titles
- Laois titles: 1
Inter-county*
Years	County	Apps (scores)
2003-2022	Laois	79 (7-190)
Inter-county titles
- Leinster titles: 1
- *Inter County team apps and scores correct as of 26 July 2022.

Ross Munnelly (born 23 December 1982) is an Irish sportsperson from County Laois. He plays Gaelic football for his club Arles–Kilcruise and previously for the Laois senior team. In 2003, he was part of the Laois team that won the Leinster Senior Football Championship title for the first time since 1946. He usually plays at wing forward for Laois.

== Playing career ==
=== Club ===
In 2003, Munnelly starred when his club Arles–Kilcruise won the Laois Senior Football Championship title.

=== Inter-county ===
Munnelly emerged on to the scene in 2000 as part of the Laois minor team and in 2002 and 2003 he was part of the Laois Under-21 team. In 2003, he joined the Laois senior football team, helping them to a Leinster Senior Football Championship.

In 2005, he captained Laois to the final of that year's Leinster Senior Football Championship; they were beaten by Dublin. The team went on to defeat Derry in the All-Ireland Senior Football Championship, before being beaten by Armagh in the All-Ireland Senior Football Championship quarter-final.

In 2006, Laois were defeated by Mayo in their All-Ireland Senior Football Championship quarter-final encounter. It was all downhill from there. Following this, Laois were knocked out in the All-Ireland qualifiers by Derry in 2007 and by Down in both 2008 and 2009.

As of the conclusion of the 2022 season, Munnelly was the joint longest serving inter-county player (alongside Niall McNamee of Offaly).

Munnelly retired from inter-county football at the end of the 2022 season.

=== International rules ===
In 2005, Munnelly was chosen to represent Ireland in the International Rules Series away to Australia, and in 2006 he was nominated for an All Stars Award. Though not chosen on the team, he was called up to travel to Dubai as a replacement in January 2007.

He played twice for Ireland against Australia in the 2013 International Rules Series, as Ireland romped to a record-breaking victory.

== Career statistics ==
As of 26 July 2022

Appearances and scores by team, season and competition
Team	Season	National League			Leinster		All-Ireland		Total	
Team	Season	Division	Apps	Score	Apps	Score	Apps	Score	Apps	Score
Laois	2003	Division 1B			5	1-14	1	0-00	6	1-14
Laois	2004	Division 1B			4	0-15	1	0-00	5	0-15
Laois	2005	Division 1B			3	1-16	2	0-08	5	1-24
Laois	2006	Division 1B			2	0-07	5	2-15	7	2-22
Laois	2007	Division 1			3	1-02	1	0-01	4	1-03
Laois	2008	Division 1			2	0-06	2	0-02	4	0-08
Laois	2009	Division 2			2	0-01	1	0-00	3	0-01
Laois	2010	Division 2			2	0-01	1	0-01	3	0-02
Laois	2011	Division 2			2	0-05	2	0-04	4	0-09
Laois	2012	Division 1			1	0-02	5	1-18	6	1-20
Laois	2013	Division 2			1	0-00	4	1-18	5	1-18
Laois	2014	Division 2			2	0-16	3	0-05	5	0-21
Laois	2015	Division 2			3	0-05	1	0-04	4	0-09
Laois	2016	Division 2			2	0-03	2	0-02	4	0-05
Laois	2017	Division 3			2	0-00	2	0-01	4	0-01
Laois	2018	Division 4			4	0-10	1	0-03	5	0-13
Laois	2019	Division 3			1	0-01	1	0-02	2	0-03
Laois	2020	Division 2			2	0-02	-		2	0-02
Laois	2021	Division 2			1	0-00	-		1	0-00
Laois	2022	Division 3			0	0-00	-		0	0-00
Total					44	3-106	35	4-84	79	7-190
