= Paul Earley =

Irish Australian rules and Gaelic footballer

Personal information
- Native name: Pol Ó Mochóir (Irish)
- Born: 3 July 1964 (age 62) County Roscommon, Ireland

Sport
- Sport: Gaelic football
- Position: Forward
Club
- Years: Club
- 1980s–2000s: Michael Glavey's
Club titles
- Roscommon titles: 0
Inter-county
Years	County	Apps (scores)
1982–1994	Roscommon	37 (2–31)
Inter-county titles
- Connacht titles: 2
- All-Irelands: 0
- NFL: 0
- All Stars: 1

Paul Earley

Personal information
- Full name: Paul Earley
- Born: 3 July 1964 (age 62)
- Original team: Roscommon
- Height: 188 cm (6 ft 2 in)
- Weight: 85 kg (187 lb)

Playing career^{1}
Years	Club	Games (Goals)
1984	Melbourne	1 (1)
- ^{1} Playing statistics correct to the end of 1984.

Paul Earley (born 3 July 1964) is a former Irish sportsman who played Australian rules football for Melbourne in the Victorian Football League (VFL) and Gaelic football for the Roscommon county team.

Earley was the first player recruited from Ireland to play a VFL match, beating Sean Wight who was also listed by Melbourne at the time. He made his only appearance in Melbourne's last game of the 1984 VFL season, when they lost to Richmond by 28 points at the MCG.

Due to family reasons, Earley returned to Ireland at the end of the year and rejoined Roscommon, with whom his elder brother, Dermot Earley Snr, played. He was named as a full-forward in the 1985 GAA All Stars team and represented Ireland in the 1987 International Rules series. The former VFL footballer then played in Roscommon's 1990 and 1991 Connacht Championship winning teams. Earley later managed both Allenwood and Celbridge.

Earley has worked as a commentator for Setanta Sports. Since 2014, he has worked as a commentator for Sky Sports.

On 4 February 2013, Earley was announced as the new manager of Ireland. His tenure with Ireland was reasonably successful - he is most noted for leading the country to record-breaking victories over Australia to win the 2013 International Rules Series title. He returned to the coaching role for the 2014 test match, though oversaw an Irish squad which fell 10 points short of a star-studded Australian team.

== See also ==
- List of players who have converted from one football code to another
