= Tommy McGuinness =

Irish Gaelic footballer

Personal information
- Native name: Tomás Mag Aonasa (Irish)
- Born: Navan, County Meath, Ireland

Sport
- Sport: Gaelic football
- Position: Full Back
Club
- Years: Club
- Navan Gaels
Inter-county
- Years: County
- c. 1929-1940s: Meath
Inter-county titles
- All-Irelands: 0

Tommy "The Boiler" McGuinness (1909–1987) was an Irish Gaelic footballer who played for the Meath county team. He had several successes playing inter-county football from around 1929 to the early 1940s on the Meath team. When he initially broke on to the Meath team, he typically played at midfield or centre forward. He played for a number of clubs, winning several county titles, including with Navan Gaels and later with Kilmessan. A piece on McGuinness published on HoganStand.com states that "one or two gaps in his CV" arose from several "clashes with officialdom" and meant that he was omitted from Meath squads from "time to time" – including the National Football League success of 1933. In the 1930 Leinster final against Kildare, he was played full-forward, a game which Meath drew. Meath lost the replay. The following year, Kildare again got the better of Meath in a replay. In 1934, McGuinness was moved to the full-back position. In 1939, with McGuinness in this position, Meath finally made the breakthrough and won the Leinster Championship and reached the All Ireland final. The following year, McGuinness played in the League final (as full forward) as Meath lost to Mayo. McGuinness died in 1987 and is buried in Navan.
