= Darren Fay =

Irish Gaelic footballer

Personal information
- Native name: Darren Ó Féich (Irish)
- Born: 11 April 1976 (age 50) Trim, County Meath, Ireland
- Height: 6 ft 2 in (188 cm)

Sport
- Sport: Gaelic football
- Position: Full Back
Club
- Years: Club
- Trim
Inter-county*
Years	County	Apps (scores)
1996–2008	Meath	49
Inter-county titles
- Leinster titles: 3
- All-Irelands: 2
- NFL: 1
- All Stars: 3
- *Inter County team apps and scores correct as of 17:42, 4 August 2007 (UTC).

Darren Fay (born 11 April 1976 in Trim, County Meath) is a former Gaelic footballer who played for the Meath county team. He is regarded as the latest in a long line of accomplished Meath full-backs, following the likes of Mick Lyons, Jack Quinn, Paddy O'Brien and Tommy "The Boiler" McGuinness. He plays club football for Trim. He came to prominence in 1996 when he won an All-Ireland senior medal in his first season as a Meath regular first team player. In 1999 he won his second All-Ireland medal. He is also the holder of 3 Leinster Senior medals. Fay has won 3 All Star awards. For the 2006 season Fay made himself unavailable for the Meath team but he returned to the Meath panel for the 2007 season. On 23 July 2008 Fay confirmed his retirement after a defeat to Limerick.

He was a selector when Barry Callaghan managed the Meath under-20 team.

== Honours ==
- 3 Leinster Senior Football Championship 1996 1999 2001
- 2 All-Ireland Senior Football Championship 1996 1999
- 2 Leinster Under-21 Football Championship 1996 1997
- 1 Leinster Minor Football Championship 1993
- 1 National Football League Division 2 2007
- 1 [PhD in Experimental Physics NUIM 2014]

Awards

- 3 All-Star 1996 1999 2001
- 1 GPA All-Star 2007
