= Paul McGrane =

Armagh Gaelic footballer

Personal information
- Nickname: Floppy
- Born: County Armagh, Northern Ireland
- Occupation: Accountant
- Height: 6 ft 2 in (188 cm)

Sport
- Sport: Gaelic football
- Position: Midfield
Club
- Years: Club
- Ballyhegan Davitts GAC
Inter-county
- Years: County
- 1993-2008: Armagh
Inter-county titles
- Ulster titles: 7
- All-Irelands: 1
- NFL: 1
- All Stars: 2

Paul McGrane is an Irish Gaelic footballer who played at senior level for the Armagh county team in the 1990s and 2000s. He won an All-Ireland Senior Football Championship medal, seven Ulster Championships and a National League title with the county. He also won two All Star awards.

McGrane plays club football for Ballyhegan Davitts.

McGrane is a midfielder. He is known as one of Armagh's best ever players. In 2009 to mark the 125th anniversary of the Gaelic Athletic Association he was named by The Irish News as one of the all-time best 125 footballers from Ulster.

== Playing career ==
=== Inter-county ===
In 1992 McGrane won the Ulster Minor Football League and Ulster Minor Football Championship with the Armagh Minor team. Armagh finished runners-up to Meath in that year's All-Ireland Minor final. He was captain of the Minor team that year.

McGrane made his Senior inter-county Championship debut for Armagh against Fermanagh in May 1993. He won his first Ulster Senior Football Championship medal with the county in 1999 – the county's first Ulster Championship in 17 years. Armagh successfully defended their Ulster title the following year.

In 2002, he helped Armagh win the Ulster Championship as well as the county's first ever All-Ireland Senior Football Championship. McGrane received an All Star award for his performances that year.

In 2003 Armagh once again reached the All-Ireland final, but were defeated by neighbours Tyrone. 2004 saw McGrane and Armagh again win the Ulster Championship. In 2005, McGrane helped Armagh win the National League, beating Wexford in the final. Later that year, he helped Armagh win another Ulster Championship. Team captain Kieran McGeeney invited McGrane to lift the Anglo Celt Cup with him after the match. McGrane was awarded a second All Star that year.

McGrane took over the Armagh captaincy in November 2005, after Kieran McGeeney retired. Armagh completed a three-in-a-row of Ulster Championships in 2006, this time with McGrane as captain. McGrane won another Ulster Championship medal with Armagh in 2008, his seventh in all and second as captain.

McGrane retired from inter-county football in April 2009, due to a persistent knee injury.

=== Club ===
With Ballyhegan, McGrane has won the Armagh Junior Football Championship (1995) and Armagh Intermediate Football Championship (1997).

=== International Rules ===
McGrane represented Ireland in the International Rules Series.

=== Province ===
McGrane played for Ulster, and won the Railway Cup on ? occasions with the province.

== Management and coaching ==
In 2012, McGrane established the Orchard Academy to help young Armagh Gaelic footballers develop their talent with a view to strengthen the county's footballing fortunes at underage and senior level.

In January 2015, McGrane was appointed assistant coach for the Armagh minor Gaelic football team under former county teammate Aidan O'Rourke before taking on the manager's position a year later, staying in this role until November 2018, when he was replaced by another former Armagh teammate Ciarán McKeever.

== Honours ==
Club

- 1 Armagh Junior Football Championship 1995
- 1 Armagh Intermediate Football Championship 1997

Inter-county

- 1 All-Ireland Senior Football Championship 2002
- 7 Ulster Senior Football Championship 1999, 2000, 2002, 2004, 2005, 2006, 2008
- 1 National Football League 2005
- 1 Ulster Minor Football Championship 1992

Individual

- 2All Star 2002, 2005
