= Stephen Kelly (Limerick Gaelic footballer) =

Irish Gaelic footballer and rugby union player

Personal information
- Native name: Stiofán Ó Ceallaigh (Irish)
- Nickname: Cuz
- Born: 1982 (age 43–44) Limerick, Ireland
- Occupation: Garda
- Height: 5 ft 10 in (178 cm)

Sport
- Sport: Gaelic Football
- Position: Centre forward
Club
- Years: Club
- Newcastle West
Club titles
- Limerick titles: 1
Inter-county
- Years: County
- 2002-2015: Limerick

Stephen Kelly is a Gaelic footballer and rugby player from County Limerick. He plays football with the Limerick Senior Football team and with his local club Newcastle West. He played AIL rugby with Shannon.

== Football ==
Since 2002, he has played with the Limerick county team, who during the 2000s have become one of the top teams in Munster. He has played in 4 Munster Senior Football Championship finals with Limerick, in 2003, 2004, 2009 and 2010, but lost all four, 3 to Kerry 2003, 2004 and 2010 and one to Cork in 2009.

In 2003 he was part of the International Rules for the series in Australia.

In 2015 Stephen Kelly won his first county senior championship with Newcastle West, beating Drom/Broadford. He won his second title in 2019, beating Oola in the Gaelic Grounds.

== Rugby ==
He also plays rugby with Shannon in the All-Ireland League.
