= Kevin Reilly (Gaelic footballer) =

Meath Gaelic footballer

Personal information
- Native name: Caoimhín Ó Raghallaigh (Irish)
- Born: 22 February 1986 (age 40) Navan, Republic of Ireland
- Height: 1.9 m (6 ft 3 in)

Sport
- Sport: Gaelic football
- Position: Full Back
Club
- Years: Club
- 2003–2016: Navan O'Mahonys
Club titles
- Meath titles: 4
Inter-county
- Years: County
- 2005–2015: Meath
Inter-county titles
- Leinster titles: 1
- NFL: Div 2 2008

Kevin Reilly (born 22 February 1986) is an Irish Gaelic footballer. He played at senior level for the Meath county team from 2005 to 2015.

Reilly played in a variety of positions for Meath, appearing in midfield and half-forward in the 2009 All-Ireland Senior Football Championship semi-Final defeat to Kerry. His most frequent position was at full-back, where he played during the 2010 Leinster Senior Football Championship Final, which resulted in a victory over Louth. In 2006, 2008, 2010 and 2011, Reilly was part of the Ireland.He is in the top ten most capped players. In 2008 and 2011 the team that won the 2011 International Rules Series against Australia by 130 to 65. He has also represented Leinster and Ireland at U17 and U18 level in 2003 and 2004. In 2013, he was appointed Meath captain by Mick O'Dowd. With his club Navan O'Mahony's, he has won four Meath senior titles. He also has a Boston county championship title from 2006. Reilly announced his retirement from inter-county football in 2015 due to injury at just 29. He has won 4 Meath Senior football championships with Navan O’Mahonys 2 Sigerson Cups, 2006 and 2010 1 Hogan Cup All Ireland Schools 2004, 1 Leinster SFC 2010. He has represented Leinster in the Railway cup competition on two occasions. In December 2019, he was named as a Meath under-20 county team selector under the management of Ger Robinson. In 2021, he guided Trim to a Meath Intermediate Football championship, Leinster football championship and were All Ireland finalists. He later went on to manage Ratoath to their first Division 1 League title in 2023 defeating St. Colmcilles in the final, then going on to be narrowly beaten by Sunmerhill after extra time in that years SFC final.

Preceded by Seamus Kenny	Meath Senior Football Captain; 2013-present	Succeeded by incumbent
