= Francie Grehan =

Roscommon Gaelic footballer

Personal information
- Born: County Roscommon

Sport
- Sport: Gaelic football
- Position: Centre Back
Club
- Years: Club
- St Aidan's
Inter-county
Years	County	Apps (scores)
1998–2005	Roscommon	58 (1–24)
Inter-county titles
- Connacht titles: 1
- All Stars: 1

Francie Grehan is an Irish former Gaelic footballer who played at senior level for the Roscommon county team between 1998 and 2005. He helped Roscommon win the 2001 Connacht Senior Football Championship, and later won an All Star at centre-back.

Grehan managed Caulry to the 2014 Westmeath Intermediate Football Championship title.
