= Dermot Earley Jnr =

Kildare Gaelic footballer

Dermot Earley
Personal information
- Native name: Diarmaid Ó Maolmhoichéirghe (Irish)
- Born: 7 July 1978 (age 48) Newbridge, Ireland
- Occupation: Army Commandant
- Height: 1.9 m (6 ft 3 in)

Sport
- Sport: Gaelic football
- Position: Midfield
Club
- Years: Club
- 1996-: Sarsfields
Club titles
- Kildare titles: 4
Inter-county
- Years: County
- 1997-2013: Kildare
Inter-county titles
- Leinster titles: 2
- All-Irelands: 0
- NFL: 0
- All Stars: 2

Dermot Earley Junior (born 7 July 1978) is a Gaelic footballer who played for the Sarsfields Newbridge club and at senior level for the Kildare county team. He is the son of former Roscommon footballer and former Kildare manager Dermot Earley, brother of Kildare footballer David Earley and nephew of Roscommon footballer Paul Earley.

Earley was a regular player for Kildare at midfield position for more than 15 years and his performances won him All Star Awards in 1998 and 2009. He reached the 1998 All-Ireland Senior Football Championship Final with Kildare, and won Leinster medals in 1998 and again in 2000 after the replay against neighbours Dublin.

He retired from inter-county football in 2013.

In January 2017, Earley was named as the new chief executive of the Gaelic Players Association, replacing Dessie Farrell who stepped down in December 2016.

Involved in the Kildare backroom team of Glenn Ryan from October 2021.

== Honours ==
Club

- Kildare Senior Football Championship (4): 1999, 2001, 2005, 2012
- Kildare Senior Football League Division 1 (2): 2007, 2012
- Kildare Minor Football Championship (1): 1996

Inter-county

- Leinster Senior Football Championship (2): 1998, 2000
- All Star (2): 1998, 2009
