= Ciarán McKeever =

Armagh Gaelic footballer

Personal information
- Born: 25 June 1983 (age 43) Armagh, Northern Ireland
- Height: 1.8 m (5 ft 11 in)

Sport
- Sport: Gaelic football
- Position: Centre Back
Club
- Years: Club
- 2000 - 2022: Cullyhanna
Inter-county
- Years: County
- 2003 - 2017: Armagh
Inter-county titles
- Ulster titles: 5
- All-Irelands: 0
- NFL: 2
- All Stars: 0

Ciaran McKeever (born 25 June 1983) is an Irish Gaelic footballer who plays for St Patrick's and at senior level for the Armagh county team. He won a National Football League medal in 2005 as Armagh defeated Cavan in the final by 0-15 to 0-7.

== Playing career ==
From County Armagh, McKeever played for Ireland in the International Rules Series of 2008 and 2010, and again in 2011 when he was vice captain of the team that defeated Australia by 130 to 65. He was called up for the 2013 International Rules Series ahead of the second Test as a replacement for Finian Hanley who suffered a hamstring tear. He played at Croke Park and won the Series.

He is last known to have played in 2022 at the age of 38 when he lined out at full back for his club Cullyhanna in a Division 1B league game as they were low on numbers.

== Management career ==
McKeever has managed the Mayobridge seniors.

He was appointed Armagh minor manager in November 2018. He was Armagh minor manager until 2021 when he left to take a vacancy with the senior team under the management of Kieran McGeeney.
