= Enda Murphy =

Irish Gaelic footballer

Enda Murphy is a Kildare Gaelic football goalkeeper. He has held the position since 2002. He has played in two Leinster finals, his first in 2002 (losing out to Dublin) and again losing in 2003 (to Laois). He represented Ireland in the International Rules Series in two tests in Australia both in 2003.
