= Anthony Tohill =

Irish Gaelic footballer

Personal information
- Nickname: Saint Anthony
- Born: 2 August 1971 (age 55) Swatragh, County Londonderry, Northern Ireland
- Occupation: company director
- Height: 6 ft 4 in (193 cm)

Sport
- Sport: Gaelic football
- Position: Midfield
Club
- Years: Club
- 1989–200x: Swatragh
Inter-county
Years	County	Apps (scores)
1991–2003	Derry	? (4–121 (133))
Inter-county titles
- Ulster titles: 2
- All-Irelands: 1
- NFL: 4
- All Stars: 4

Anthony Tohill (born 2 August 1971) is an Irish former Gaelic footballer who played for the Derry county team in the 1990s and early 2000s.

He is a former chief executive of the Mid Ulster District Council.

== Early life and family ==
Tohill was born in Swatragh, a son of Hugh and Eileen Tohill. He has three brothers and four sisters. His brother, Hugh Martin Tohill, was also on the panel of Derry's 1993 All-Ireland winning team. His sister, Aileen, has had a very successful camogie career with Swatragh and Derry and is the Ulster GAA Council Lifestyle & Wellbeing Manager.

Tohill attended St John's Primary School in the village. His son, Anton, played one game of Australian rules football for Collingwood in the Australian Football League in 2021.

== Career ==
=== Inter-county ===
Tohill was an "outstanding minor" and played a prominent part in the 1989 Ulster Minor and All-Ireland Minor Football Championship winning Derry Minor team. After returning home from Australia in 1991, he concentrated on Gaelic football.

Tohill was part of Derry's National League winning team in 1992, scoring a late goal and a point to secure victory over Tyrone. That year he won his first All Star award for his performances during the year. In 1993, he won the Ulster Championship with Derry, before going on to win the 1993 All-Ireland Championship after a semi-final victory over Dublin and final defeat of Cork. He again was awarded an All Star.

Derry won back-to-back National Leagues in 1995 and 1996, with Tohill being prominent on both sides. Despite Derry only playing two Championship games in 1995, he was awarded his third All Star award. Tohill and Derry finished runners-up to Offaly in the 1998 National League decider. He added a second Ulster Championship medal in 1998, before losing out to Galway in the All-Ireland semi-final. Tohill captained Derry to another National League title in 2000 and received his fourth All-Star that year. At that stage he had received more All Star nominations that any other Ulster player ever. Tohill won Footballer of the Year at the 2000 Ulster GAA Writer's Association Awards. Tohill had another good season in 2001, when Derry reached the All-Ireland semi-final and his omission from the All Star nominations list caused great shock. He exited the county scene in 2003.

=== Club ===
Tohill played a major role in Swatragh's run to the 1993 Derry Championship final. The game was played on Saint Stephen's Day in the snow at Glenullin. Lavey narrowly defeated the Swatragh side. Tohill was top scorer in the 1993 Derry Championship with 2–26 (32 points). Prior to this he was part of Swatragh's first ever Derry Minor Championship winning side in 1988.

=== School, college, provincial titles ===
Tohill won MacRory Cups and one Hogan Cups with his school St Patrick's College, Maghera. He was also part of the 1993 Queen's University Belfast team that won the Sigerson Cup. He was top scorer in the final with 0–06. He also won Railway Cup medals with Ulster.

=== Australian rules football ===
After leaving school and All-Ireland Minor and Hogan Cup success, Tohill was head-hunted by the Melbourne Demons and after spent some time as a rookie player in Australian Rules football. He would sometimes return home to play Gaelic football while there. After breaking his leg, he returned home from Melbourne in 1991 to concentrate on Gaelic football.

=== International rules football ===
Tohill played for Ireland on four International Rules tours between 1998 (when the series was revived) and 2001. He made eight appearances for his country. In 2001, he captained Ireland in their victorious tour of Australia. He has since moved into the backrooms of the international setup, under manager Seán Boylan. He was part of the 2006 backroom team, and was a selector for the 2008 Series, and with fellow selector, Eoin Liston, took charge of the training sessions.

Observing Tohill taking the training sessions, Irish News journalist Paddy Heaney has predicted a future in management for Tohill, stating he "shows all the signs of someone who remains an avid student of the game". In March 2010, he was named as manager of the Irish International rules team.

=== Soccer ===
Tohill played association football for Derry City, and Manchester United Reserves, during a two-week trial at the club in 1995.

== Honours ==
=== County ===
- All-Ireland Senior Football Championship – Winner (1): 1993
- All-Ireland Minor Football Championship – Winner (1): 1989
- National Football League – Winner (4): 1992, 1995, 1996, 2000
- National Football League – Runner up: 1998
- Ulster Senior Football Championship – Winner (2): 1993, 1998
- Ulster Senior Football Championship – Runner up: 1992, 1997, 2000
- Ulster Minor Football Championship – Winner (1): 1989

=== Club ===
- Derry Senior Football Championship – Runner up: 1993
- Derry Minor Football Championship – Winner (1): 1988

=== Province ===
- Railway Cup – Winner (6?): 1992, 1993, 1994, 1995, 1998, 2000

=== College ===
- Sigerson Cup – Winner (1): 1993
- Sigerson Cup – Runner up: 1992?, 1994?
- Ryan Cup – Winner (1): 1992?
- Hogan Cup – Winner (1/2?): 1989, 1990?
- MacRory Cup – Winner (1/2?): 1989, 1990?

=== Individual ===
- All Star – Winner (4): 1992, 1993, 1995, 2000
- All Star – Nominated (runner up): 1996, 1997, 1999, more?
- Irish News Ulster All Stars Team of the Decade (1995–2004) – Winner
- Irish News Ulster GAA All-Star – Winner (5): 1995, 1997, 1999, 2000, 2001
- Derry Senior football captain
- In May 2020, the Irish Independent named Tohill as one of the "dozens of brilliant players" who narrowly missed selection for its "Top 20 footballers in Ireland over the past 50 years".

Note: The above lists may be incomplete. Please add any other honours you know of.

Sporting positions
Preceded by Kieran McKeever	Derry senior football captain 1999–2002	Succeeded by Enda Muldoon
