= Graham Geraghty =

Irish Gaelic footballer and politician

Personal information
- Native name: Graham Mag Oireachtaigh (Irish)
- Born: 17 May 1973 (age 53) Drogheda, Ireland
- Height: 1.85 m (6 ft 1 in)

Sport
- Sport: Gaelic football
- Position: Left Half Forward
Clubs
- Years: Club
- 1990–2008 2009–: Seneschalstown; Clann na nGael
Club titles
- Meath titles: 1
Inter-county
Years	County	Apps (scores)
1991–2012	Meath	(15–82)
Inter-county titles
- Leinster titles: 3
- All-Irelands: 2
- NFL: 2
- All Stars: 2

Graham Geraghty (born 17 May 1973), is a former Gaelic footballer who played at senior level for the Meath county team. While still an inter-county player, he stood for the Fine Gael political party at the 2007 Irish general election; he was not elected.

== Playing career ==
Geraghty represented his country against Australia in the International Rules Series in 1999, 2000 and 2006.

Geraghty has also won an All-Ireland Minor Football Championship in 1990 and an All-Ireland Under-21 Football Championship in 1993. He has been named as the Meath Player of the Year on two occasions in 1999 and more recently in 2006. Geraghty won the Martin Donnelly Cup on four occasions with Leinster.

At club level, Graham won the Meath Senior Football Championship with Seneschalstown in 1994. He has also won the Meath Under-21 Championship with Seneschalstown in 1992.

Although his achievements have come in football, he received various honours in the fields of athletics, soccer (having traveled to London for trials with British club Arsenal F.C. as a teenager, and signing for Bohemians in September 1994, he also played for Drogheda United reserves in the 1996-97 League of Ireland season), and rugby, playing and training one season with Buccaneers Reserves in 2003.

In late 2003, he published his autobiography, titled Misunderstood, which documents his childhood, adolescence, and sporting career up until the early years of the 21st century.

In 2007, Geraghty helped Meath back to the top and scored a magnificent goal against Tyrone to help earn the team a place in the semifinal.

On 23 July 2008, Geraghty retired following Meath's exit from the 2008 Championship at the hands of Limerick. On 20 May 2011, just three days after his 38th birthday, Geraghty returned to the Meath panel after a three-year absence. He came on as a substitute in Meath's first game of the Championship against Kildare at Croke Park, scoring a goal which was wrongly disallowed as a square ball. In 2012, Geraghty announced his second retirement from inter-county football and became a selector.

In December 2013, Geraghty confirmed that he would play Sigerson Cup football for Blanchardstown IT in 2014 as he is enrolled in a Social and Community Development course at the college.

In January 2021, he was named as a selector of the Meath under-20 county team under the management of Bernard Flynn.

== Honours ==
Club

- 1 Meath Senior Football Championship 1994
- 1 Meath Under-21 Football Championship 1992
- 1 Meath Junior Football Championship 2007
- 1 Leinster Junior Club Football Championship 2007

Meath

- 3 Leinster Senior Football Championship 1996 1999 2001
- 2 All-Ireland Senior Football Championship 1996 1999
- 2 Leinster Under-21 Football Championship 1991 1993
- 1 All-Ireland Under-21 Football Championship 1993
- 1 Leinster Minor Football Championship 1990
- 1 All-Ireland Minor Football Championship 1990
- 1 National Football League Division 1 1994
- 1 National Football League Division 2 2007

Leinster

- 4 Railway Cup 1996 1997 2001 2002 2005

Ireland

- 2 International rules football 1999 2001

Individual

- 2 All-Star 1994 1999
- In May 2020, the Irish Independent named Geraghty as one of the "dozens of brilliant players" who narrowly missed selection for its "Top 20 footballers in Ireland over the past 50 years".

== Association football ==
Geraghty played association football with Kentstown Rovers. After scoring 1–2 in the 1994 Leinster Senior Football Championship final loss to Dublin, Manchester United manager Alex Ferguson (a spectator at Croke Park) namechecked Geraghty in an interview with Ger Canning on RTÉ Television. Ferguson remarked that he did not have his checkbook with him, but Arsenal were alerted and invited Geraghty for a trial. In his autobiography, Arsenal's England international player Paul Merson described Geraghty as "the fittest player I ever saw". Geraghty played two matches for Arsenal before returning home to resume his career with Meath.

== Managerial ==
In November 2017, Graham was announced as the new Intermediate Football manager for Glen Emmets GFC in Tullyallen, County Louth.

== Political career ==
In 2006, Geraghty was selected by the Fine Gael political party to contest the general election of 2007 in his home constituency of Meath West. However, he performed poorly in the election, obtaining only 1,284 first preference votes - the lowest of the three Fine Gael candidates standing - and was eliminated from the race after the fourth count.

== Acting career ==
Geraghty appeared in acclaimed 1998 Irish kung fu movie Fatal Deviation opposite Boyzone's Mikey Graham. He had no lines.

== Personal life ==
Geraghty is married to Amanda and they have four children, Sophia, Lauren, Brandon and Beau

Preceded by Ray Silke (Galway)	All-Ireland Senior Football winning captain 1999	Succeeded by Seamus Moynihan (Kerry)
