= Dessie Dolan =

Westmeath Gaelic footballer

Personal information
- Native name: Deasún Ó Dúláin (Irish)
- Born: 11 July 1979 (age 47) Athlone, Ireland
- Occupation: Teacher
- Height: 1.83 m (6 ft 0 in)

Sport
- Sport: Gaelic football
- Position: Left corner forward
Club
- Years: Club
- 1997–2019: Garrycastle
Club titles
- Westmeath titles: 8
- Leinster titles: 1
College
- Years: College
- NUI Galway
College titles
- Sigerson titles: 1
Inter-county**
Years	County	Apps (scores)
1999–2014	Westmeath	? (22-551)
Inter-county titles
- Leinster titles: 1
- NFL: 3
- All Stars: 1
- **Inter County team apps and scores correct as of 18 November 2014.

Dessie Dolan (born 11 July 1979) is an Irish Gaelic football manager and former player who was manager of the senior Westmeath county team between 2022 and 2024.

He played for the Garrycastle club and for the Westmeath county team, as well as international rules football for Ireland. He won a Leinster Senior Football Championship medal with Westmeath in 2004 and was given an All Star at the end of the year. He was his county's highest championship scorer until John Heslin overtook him in the 2022 Tailteann Cup final (for which Dolan was a selector).

== Playing career ==
=== University ===
Dolan played football for NUI Galway while studying at the team's parent university. He was unable to play during the 2003 Sigerson Cup winning game as a result of a torn hamstring sustained during the quarter-final.

=== Inter-county ===
Dolan has been widely regarded as Westmeath's leading talisman throughout their ascension from GAA minnows to quality opposition. Despite the growth and promise demonstrated in their 1999 U21 All Ireland victory, Westmeath experienced their most successful GAA period of their history between 2001–2008.

Largely due to virtually unmatchable talent in attack, Westmeath forced their way into GAA pundits' heads as upsetters and sometimes favourites. Two Division 2 league titles spearheaded by Dolan's attacking prowess and eventually, in 2004, Championship success in winning a Leinster Senior Football Championship title finally showed the squad's promise.

Westmeath reached three All-Ireland Senior Football Championship quarter-finals since the revamped championship system of 2001, with Dolan starring each season (2001, 2004, 2006).

In 2013, Dolan expressed concern about the gulf in class that had opened up between the Dublins and Westmeaths.

In summer of 2014, Dolan announced his retirement from inter-county football following the subsequent exit to Cavan.

=== Club ===
At club level Dolan won numerous underage titles and back-to-back senior titles in 2005 and 2006 with club, Garrycastle.

His last competitive game was a Leinster Senior Club Football Championship semi-final defeat to Ballyboden St Enda's in November 2019.

=== International rules ===
Dolan was regularly selected for the Ireland international rules football team until the series was suspended in 2006.

== Managerial career ==
Dolan was appointed manager of the Westmeath senior football team on 21 September 2022. Dolan walked in August 2024.

== Other interests ==
In 2017 Dolan and his wife Kelly participated in an episode of Room to Improve, series 10, episode 3, 'Moate'.

Dolan participated in a marketing campaign for Ireland West Airport.

He currently works as a pundit on The Sunday Game.

== Honours ==
Garrycastle

- Leinster Senior Club Football Championship (1): 2011
- Westmeath Senior Football Championship (8): 2001, 2002, 2004, 2009, 2010, 2011, 2014, 2019
- Westmeath Division 1 Leagues (8): 2001, 2002, 2003, 2008, 2009, 2012, 2014,2018

Westmeath

- Leinster Senior Football Championship (1): 2004
- National Football League, Division 2 (3): 2001, 2003, 2008
- All-Ireland Under-21 Football Championship (1): 1999
- Leinster Under-21 Football Championship (2): 1999, 2000

Individual

- All Star (1): 2004

Sporting positions
Preceded by Jack Cooney	Westmeath Senior Football Manager; 2022–2024	Succeeded by Dermot McCabe
