= Cormac McAnallen =

Irish Gaelic footballer (1980–2004)

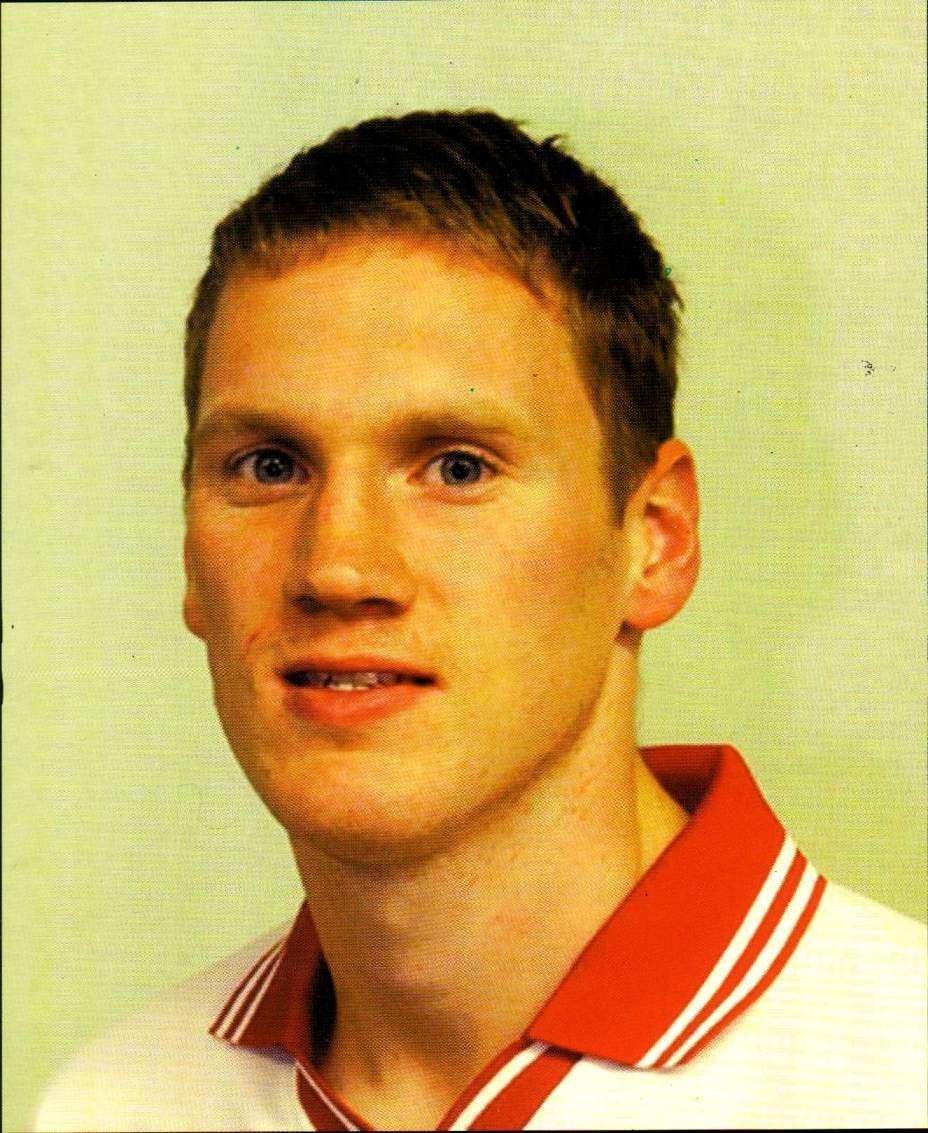
- Cormac McAnallen's Tyrone headshot

Personal information
- Native name: Cormac Mac An Ailín (Irish)
- Born: 11 February 1980 The Brantry, County Tyrone, Northern Ireland
- Died: 2 March 2004 (aged 24)
- Occupation: Teacher
- Height: 6 ft 1 in (185 cm)

Sport
- Sport: Gaelic football
- Position: Full Back / Midfield
Club
- Years: Club
- ?–2004: Eglish
Club titles
- Tyrone titles: 1 (Dublin)
Inter-county
- Years: County
- ?–2004: Tyrone
Inter-county titles
- Ulster titles: 2
- All-Irelands: 1
- All Stars: 1

Cormac McAnallen (Irish: Cormac Mac An Ailín; 11 February 1980 – 2 March 2004) was an Irish Gaelic footballer who played for the Eglish St Patrick's club and the Tyrone county team.

With Tyrone, McAnallen won the All-Ireland Senior Football Championship in 2003, and twice won both the Ulster Senior Football Championship and National League titles. At underage level he won an All-Ireland Minor and two All-Ireland Under-21 Championships with Tyrone. He also won an All Stars Award for his performances in the 2003 Championship.

McAnallen played for UCD while studying in Dublin and helped the university win the Dublin Senior Football Championship.

McAnallen died suddenly on 2 March 2004, aged 24. Despite his relatively short career, he won almost every honour in the game. He was often captain of successful teams, and was known as a particularly inspirational captain.

== Early life ==
Cormac McAnallen was born on 11 February 1980 in Dungannon. His parents were Brendan and Bridget, and he had two brothers Donal and Fergus. They lived together in the Brantry.

Between 1984 and 1990 Cormac attended Derrylatinee Primary School; from 1990 to 1997 he attended St Patrick's Grammar School in Armagh. At St Patrick's he was part of the team that won the Blackboard Jungle quiz on RTÉ (1996/97). He was a student at Queen's University Belfast between 1997 and 2001, and in 2001/02 he studied at University College Dublin (UCD), while doing teaching practice at St Benildus College, Stillorgan. He graduated from Queen's in 2000 with a B.A. in History, and in 2001 with a postgraduate diploma in Computer-Based Learning. He graduated from UCD in 2002 with a higher diploma in Education. He was posthumously named Queen's University Graduate of the Year in 2004.

== Personal life ==
From 2002 to 2004, Cormac's main subject of teaching was history and politics at St Catherine's College, Armagh, and he managed school sports teams. He also however taught other subjects such as history, politics, mathematics, computers, French and Religion. He was well liked by students and staff alike. In his after-school hours he acted as a Youth-Sport co-ordinator in the Armagh district, and he was frequently a coach at Tyrone GAA summer camps.

In December 2003, McAnallen became engaged to Ashlene Moore. In his spare time, McAnallen played a wide range of sports – including hurling, golf, table tennis and soccer – and loved watching every type of sport. He was also a keen participant in quizzes, and he took a great interest in history and Gaelic culture.

== Playing career ==
=== Inter-county ===
At Minor level, McAnallen won the 1997 Ulster Minor Championship with Tyrone and they went on to reach the All-Ireland Minor final, but were defeated by Laois. The following year with McAnallen as captain, Tyrone defended their Ulster crown and also went on to win the All-Ireland Minor title. He was named Personality of the Year by the Ulster GAA Writers Association in 1998.

McAnallen was Tyrone Under-21 captain in 2000 and 2001. In both those years the county won both the Ulster Under-21 Championship and the All-Ireland Under-21 Championship twice.

By this stage he was already playing for the Tyrone Senior side. In 2001 he won an Ulster Senior Championship medal and was named both All Stars Young Footballer of the Year and the Ulster GAA Writers Association's Footballer of the Year.

He was a midfielder on the Tyrone team that won back-to-back National League titles in 2002 and 2003. In 2003 he moved to the full-back position and two months later the team won the All-Ireland Senior Football Championship for the first time in the county's history. Tyrone had also won the Ulster Championship earlier in the summer en route to winning the All-Ireland. McAnallen was rewarded with an All Star award for his performances in the 2003 Championship.

In 2004, just over a week before his death, he captained Tyrone to success in the Dr. McKenna Cup.

=== Club ===
McAnallen won consecutive Tyrone Minor Championships with Eglish in 1996 and 1997. He won a Tyrone Intermediate Championship medal with the club in 1997.

McAnallen played for UCD while studying at the university and won the Dublin Senior Football Championship medal in 2001 and 2002 captaining the team both years.

=== Province ===
McAnallen won a Railway Cup medal with Ulster in 2003 and also played in the competition in 2001.

=== International ===
McAnallen represented Ireland in the International Rules Series against Australia in 2001, 2002 and 2003.

=== College ===
McAnallen won the Ryan Cup with Queen's University Belfast in 1999, and the following year helped the university win the Sigerson Cup.

== Other sports ==
McAnallen played hurling for the Clan na nGael club. While at St Pat's Armagh he played basketball and won Ulster Schools 'A' basketball titles from Under-14 to Under-19 levels. He also represented Ulster at basketball from Under-14 to Under-17 levels.

== Death ==
McAnallen died in his sleep on 2 March 2004, aged 24, from an undetected heart condition, sudden adult death syndrome.

=== Legacy ===
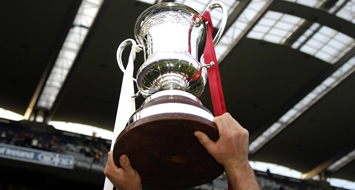
The Cormac McAnallen Cup presented to the International Rules Series winners

In 2004, the Cormac McAnallen Cup, the cup that Ireland and Australia play for in the International Rules Series, was named in his honour.

In January 2005, the Cormac McAnallen's GAC, a GAA club, was founded in Sydney, Australia.

== Honours ==
Inter-county

Senior

- All-Ireland Senior Football Championship:
  - Winner (1): 2003
- National Football League:
  - Winner (2): 2002, 2003
- Ulster Senior Football Championship:
  - Winner (2): 2001, 2003
- Dr McKenna Cup:
  - Winner (1): 2004

Under-21

- All-Ireland Under-21 Football Championship:
  - Winner (2): 2000, 2001
- Ulster Under-21 Football Championship:
  - Winner (2): 2000, 2001

Minor

- All-Ireland Minor Football Championship:
  - Winner (1): 1998
  - Runner up: 1997
- Ulster Minor Football Championship:
  - Winner (2): 1997, 1998
- Ulster Minor Football League:
  - Winner (1): 1998

Club

- Dublin Senior Football Championship:
  - Winner (1): 2002
- Tyrone Intermediate Football Championship:
  - Winner (1): 1997
- Tyrone Minor Football Championship:
  - Winner (2): 1996, 1997

Province

- Railway Cup:
  - Winner (1): 2003

School/college

- Nannery Cup (Ulster U-15½ football championship):
  - Winner: Year?
- Sigerson Cup:
  - Winner: 2000
- Ryan Cup:
  - Winner: 1999

Individual

- All Star:
  - Winner (1): 2003
  - Nominated (runner up): ?
- All Stars Young Footballer of the Year – Winner (1): 2001
- Irish News Ulster GAA All-Star – Winner (2): 2001, 2003
- Ulster GAA Writers Association Personality of the Year: – 1998
- Ulster GAA Writers Association Footballer of the Year: – 2001
- Belfast Telegraph Personality of the Year: – 2001

Scór

- Trath na gCeist, Scór na nÓg Thír Eoghain (3): 1992, 1993, 1994
- All-Ireland Scór na nÓg Trath na gCeist: 1995
- Trath na gCeist, Scór Sinsear Thír Eoghain (3): 1999, 2001, 2003

== See also ==
- Sudden cardiac death of athletes
