= Graham Canty =

Irish Gaelic football player

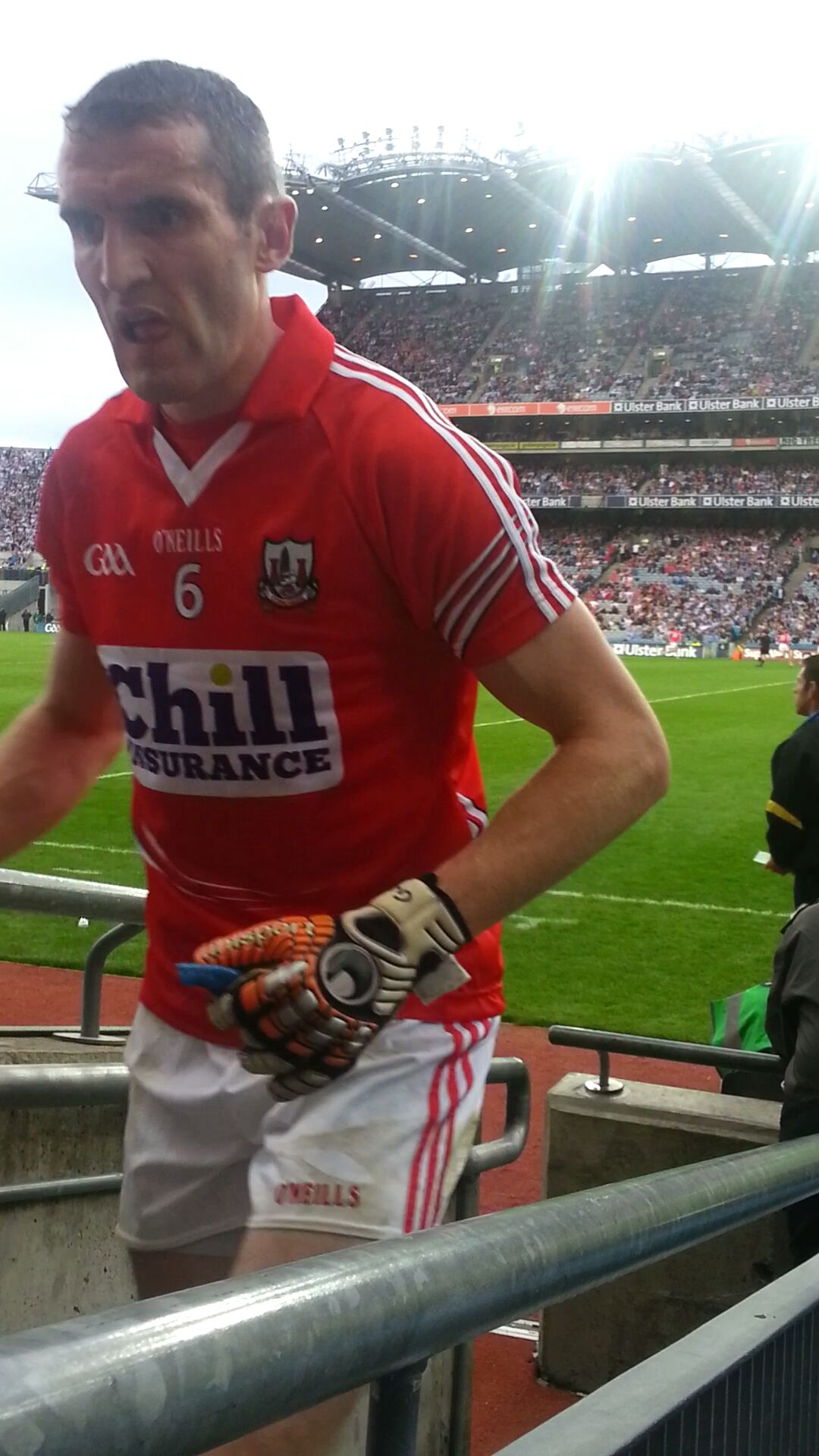

Personal information
- Native name: Graham Ó Cáinte (Irish)
- Born: 23 July 1980 (age 46) Cork, Ireland
- Occupation: Engineer
- Height: 1.85 m (6 ft 1 in)

Sport
- Sport: Gaelic Football
- Position: Centre-back
Clubs
- Years: Club
- 1997–2018 2009-2017: Bantry Blues → Carbery
Club titles
- Cork titles: 1
Inter-county*
Years	County	Apps (scores)
1999–2013	Cork	62 (1–10)
Inter-county titles
- Munster titles: 5
- All-Irelands: 1
- NFL: 2
- All Stars: 3
- *Inter County team apps and scores correct as of 15:05, 2 November 2013.

Graham Canty (born 23 July 1980) is an Irish Gaelic footballer who played as a centre-back for the Cork senior team. Canty went on to play a key role in defence for over a decade, and won one All-Ireland medal, four Munster medals and one National Football League medal. An All-Ireland runner-up on two occasions, Canty captained the team to the All-Ireland title in 2010.

Canty represented the Ireland team in the International rule on a number of occasions throughout his career, claiming three winners' medals in the process. He was also a regular on the Munster inter-provincial team. At club level Canty won one championship medal with Bantry Blues.

Throughout his career, Canty made 61 championship appearances for Cork. He announced his retirement from inter-county football on 1 November 2013.

== Early life ==
Born in Bantry, County Cork, Canty arrived on the inter-county scene at the age of seventeen when he first linked up with the Cork minor team, before later joining the under-21 side. He made his senior debut in the 2000 championship.

== Playing career ==
=== Club ===
Canty plays his club football with his local club called Bantry Blues and has enjoyed some success. He also plays with the Carbery divisional team. He first came to prominence with the club in the underage grades; however, success was slow in coming.

Canty joined the club's senior team in the late 1990s and immediately enjoyed his first major victory. In 1998 Bantry Blues reached the final of the county senior championship with Canty lining out in defence. Divisional side Duhallow provided the opposition; however, the west Cork men were too strong for the north Cork division. A 0–17 to 2–6 score line gave Bantry Blues the title and gave Canty his first, and to date his only, county winners' medal.

The following year Canty was a member of the Bantry Blues under-21 football team. He added a West Cork Under-21 title to his collection on that occasion.

Two years later in 2001 Bantry Blues qualified for the final of the county senior championship final. Nemo Rangers, the kingpins of the championship, provided the opposition, however, Canty's side were no match for the city club. A 1–14 to 0–6 trouncing resulted in defeat for Bantry Blues.

=== Minor & under-21 ===
Canty for came to prominence on the inter-county scene as a member of the Cork minor football team in the late 1990s. It was a period when 'the Rebels' were going through a lull at underage level in the provincial series of games.

After failing to even win a Munster title with the minors, Canty later moved onto the Cork under-21 team. Once again, success was slow in coming; however, in 2001 he was appointed captain of the county's under-21 team. That year he guided Cork to a Munster final appearance against Limerick. That game ended in a 1–12 to 0–8 victory for 'the Rebels'. Not only did Canty collect a Munster under-21 winners' medal but he also had the honour of lifting the cup on behalf of his county. Cork were later defeated in the All-Ireland semi-final.

=== Senior ===
In 2001 Canty established himself in the full-back position on the Cork senior football team. That year he lined out in his first senior provincial decider. Arch-rivals and reigning All-Ireland champions Kerry were the opponents. The game was a reasonably close affair; however, 'the Kingdom' never looked like losing. At the full-time whistle Cork were defeated by 0–19 to 1–13. 2001 was the first year of the qualifier system so, in spite of being defeated, Cork had another chance to battle for the All-Ireland title. Canty's side, however, were subsequently dumped out of the championship by Galway.

2002 proved to be a more successful year for Canty. After winning against Kerry in the provincial semi-final, Cork qualified for a Munster final showdown with Tipperary. While many people expected Cork to win the game easily, Tipp nearly sneaked a win, however, the provincial decider ended in a draw. The replay was an absolute rout. Cork won by 1–23 to 0–7, giving Canty a Munster winners' medal in the senior grade. Cork later reached the All-Ireland semi-final where they met Kerry for the third time in the championship that year. Furthermore, it was the first-ever meeting of these two great rivals in Croke Park. While expectations were high the game turned into a rout as everything went Kerry's way. Talismanic forward Colin Corkery was red-carded as 'the Rebels' were defeated by 3–19 to 2–7. The year ended with the Cork hurling team going on strike. In turn, the football team joined in a sympathy strike. The players, who had been seeking better conditions, refused to play or train with the county again until the dispute with the county board was resolved. After a protracted standoff, the players grievances were eventually settled.

2003 was a difficult year as Cork surrendered their provincial crown at an early stage before later crashing out of the championship in the All-Ireland qualifiers.

In 2004 Canty's side fared no better. After losing to Kerry in the Munster semi-final Cork had to manoeuvre through the qualifiers again. An unconvincing victory over Clare was followed by a humiliating 0–18 to 0–12 defeat by Fermanagh.

By 2005 the Cork footballers had regrouped and reached the Munster final for the first time in three years. Once again Kerry, the reigning All-Ireland champions, provided the opposition. The game was a close affair, however, Canty's side were narrowly defeated by just 1–11 to 0–11. This did not mean the end of Cork's All-Ireland ambitions. After winning their next two games 'the Rebels' qualified for an All-Ireland semi-final meeting with Kerry. In an embarrassing game of football for Cork, Canty's side were trounced by thirteen points on a score line of 1–19 to 0–9.

In 2006 Canty's team reached the Munster final with Kerry lining out against them. That game ended in a 0–10 apiece draw. The replay saw a much fresher Cork team surprisingly defeat Kerry by 1–12 to 0–9. James Masters proved the hero of the day, as he scored 1–7. Canty had secured a second Munster winners' medal in the senior grade. The quirks of the championship saw Cork face Kerry again in the subsequent All-Ireland semi-final for the third time in five seasons. In a similar pattern to previous encounters Cork failed to beat Kerry at Croke Park. A 0–16 to 0–10 resulted in Cork being knocked out of the championship.

In 2007 Cork were out to atone for their defeats by Kerry the previous year. Both sides met in the provincial decider for the third year in succession. Cork gave a good account of themselves, however, Kerry could not be beaten and Canty's side went down on a 1–15 to 1–13 score line. Cork later did well in the subsequent All-Ireland series and finally qualified for the All-Ireland final after an eight-year absence. In a cruel twist Kerry were the opponents. While the first half was played on an even keel, 'the Kingdom' ran riot in the second half and a rout ensued. Goalkeeper Alan Quirke came in for much criticism after conceding some easy goals. At the full-time whistle Cork were trounced by 3–13 to 1–9.

In 2008 Canty's leadership skills on the field of play were rewarded when he was appointed captain of the team for the year. Cork gained a modicum of revenge on Kerry when the sides met again in that year's Munster final. Kerry were cruising by eight points at the interval, however, Cork stormed back in the second-half. Kerry could only muster three points as Cork secured a remarkable 1–16 to 1–11 victory. It was Canty's third Munster winners' medal and his first as captain. Both sides met again in the All-Ireland semi-final, however, after a thrilling draw and a replay Kerry were the team that advanced to the championship decider.

In 2009 Canty remained as captain of the Cork side, a team that had been earmarked as potential All-Ireland contenders. After a defeat of Kerry in a replay of the Munster semi-final, Cork subsequently faced Limerick in the Munster final. Cork were the red-hot favourites going into the game, however, Limerick put Cork to the pin of their collars. After a slow start 'the Rebels' settled and eventually secured a narrow 2–6 to 0–11 victory. It was Canty's fourth Munster title. Cork later qualified for an All-Ireland final showdown with age-old rivals Kerry. Surprisingly, the men from 'the Kingdom' went into the game as slight underdogs. This tag appeared to be justified when Cork raced to a 1–3 to 0–1 early in the opening half. The Kerry team stuck to their gameplan, helped in no small part by a Cork side that recorded fourteen wides. At the final whistle Kerry were the champions by 0–16 to 1–9. It was a bitterly disappointing All-Ireland defeat for Cork the second time in three years.

In 2010 Canty endured an injury-ravaged season. He missed Cork's National League triumph over Mayo, however, he returned in time for the championship. Cork exited the provincial series at the hands of Kerry after a draw and a replay. After a trek through the qualifiers Cork reached the All-Ireland final for the third time in four years. On 19 September 2010, Graham Canty led Cork to All-Ireland success over Down with a scoreline of 16 points to 15 points.

=== Inter-provincial ===
Canty has also lined out with Munster in the inter-provincial series of games and has enjoyed some success. He first lined out with his province in 2001 when Munster were drawn to play Leinster in the semi-final. That was an exciting game that featured a period of extra-time. In the end victory narrowly went to Leinster by 2–11 to 0–16.

Three years later Canty was back on the Munster starting fifteen. Leinster were once again the opponents, however, a similar game unfolded. Leinster emerged as the winners by just a single point on a score line of 1–10 to 1–9.

Canty was added to the Munster panel again in 2007. He came on as a substitute in the Railway Cup final against Ulster, however, the northern province emerged victorious by 1–12 to 1–8.

=== International ===
Canty has also been chosen for duty with the Ireland team in the International Rules Series against Australia. He first lined out for his country in the first test in 2001. Ireland won that game and later went on to win the second test by a considerable margin. An aggregate score of 130–105 gave Ireland the series victory and gave Canty an International Rules winners' medal.

Canty was chosen for International Rules duty again the following year. Australia, however, narrowly won the first test by 65 points to 58 points. The second test ended in a 42 points apiece draw. As a result of this Ireland lost by an aggregate score of 7 points.

Canty's footballing prowess earned him a place on the Ireland team again in 2003. A close series of games developed once again. Australia won the first test by 10 points, however, Ireland narrowed the margin of victory to just 3 points for the second test a week later. A 101–94 aggregate score line gave Australia a second consecutive International Rules title.

In 2004 it was Australia's turn to travel to Ireland for the two game series. Once again Canty was included in the team for both games. Ireland were the runaway winners of the first test, however, their margin of victory was reduced in the second test. In spite of this, Ireland were still the winners of the series with an aggregate score of 132–82. The victory also resulted in a second winners' medal for Canty in this competition.

For the fifth successive year in 2005 Canty was included in the Ireland squad that travelled to Australia for the International Rules series. It was a disappointing two-game series as Ireland were trounced in both tests. A 163–106 aggregate score line resulted in a defeat for Canty's Ireland side.

Canty was not chosen for the Ireland team in 2006 while the series was cancelled in 2007. He returned to the team in 2008 and was appointed vice-captain to Tyrone's Seán Cavanagh. Ireland won the first test by just a single point, however, the result of the second test was just as tight. In the end Ireland won the two-game series by an aggregate of five points. It was Canty's third International Rules winners' medal.

== Career statistics ==
Team	Season	National League			Munster		All-Ireland		Total	
Team	Season	Division	Apps	Score	Apps	Score	Apps	Score	Apps	Score
Cork	1999-00	Division 1A	5	0-00	1	0-00	—		6	0-00
Cork	2000-01	Division 2A	5	0-01	3	0-02	1	0-00	9	0-03
Cork	2002	Division 1A	1	0-00	4	0-00	2	0-01	7	0-01
Cork	2003	Division 1A	6	1-01	0	0-00	1	0-00	7	1-01
Cork	2004	Division 1A	5	0-00	1	0-00	2	0-01	8	0-01
Cork	2005	Division 1A	0	0-00	2	0-00	3	0-00	5	0-00
Cork	2006	Division 1A	7	0-00	3	0-00	0	0-00	10	0-00
Cork	2007	Division 1A	0	0-00	3	0-00	4	0-00	7	0-00
Cork	2008	Division 2	4	0-01	2	1-00	2	0-00	8	1-01
Cork	2009	Division 2	7	0-04	4	0-01	3	0-01	14	0-06
Cork	2010	Division 1	1	0-00	2	0-00	6	0-03	9	0-03
Cork	2011	Division 1	0	0-00	3	0-00	2	0-01	5	0-01
Cork	2012	Division 1	6	0-01	1	0-00	2	0-00	9	0-01
Cork	2013	Division 1	6	0-00	3	0-00	2	0-00	11	0-00
Career total			53	1-08	32	1-03	30	0-07	115	2-18

== Honours ==
Bantry Blues

- Cork Senior Football Championship (1): 1998

Cork

- All-Ireland Senior Football Championship (1): 2010 (c)
- Munster Senior Football Championship (4): 2002, 2006, 2008 (c), 2009 (c)
- National Football League (Division 1) (2): 2012 (c)
- National Football League (Division 2) (1): 2009 (c)
- Munster Under-21 Football Championship (1): 2001 (c)

Ireland

- International Rules Series (3): 2001, 2004, 2008 (vc)

== See also ==
- Ó an Cháintighe

Awards and achievements
Preceded by Darran O'Sullivan (Kerry)	All-Ireland Senior Football Final winning captain 2010	Succeeded by Bryan Cullen (Dublin)

Sporting positions
Preceded by Derek Kavanagh	Cork Senior Football Captain; 2008–2013	Succeeded by Michael Shields
