= John Quane =

Irish Gaelic footballer

Personal information
- Born: County Limerick, Ireland

Sport
- Sport: Gaelic football
- Position: Midfield
Club
- Years: Club
- Galtee Gaels
Inter-county
- Years: County
- 1991-2005: Limerick
Inter-county titles
- Munster titles: 0
- All-Irelands: 0
- NFL: 0
- All Stars: 0

John Quane was a Gaelic footballer from County Limerick, Ireland. He played in midfield with the Limerick team from 1991 to 2005.

In his first year at senior level, he helped Limerick to reach a first Munster Senior Football Championship final since 1965. In the final, against Kerry, Limerick lost on a 0-23 to 3-12 scoreline. After a number of years, Limerick again made it to the 2003 and 2004 Munster Senior Football Championship finals but lost out again to Kerry in both.

When the qualifiers were brought into the championship, it offered teams like Limerick a second chance in the championship. Limerick used this change well, and in 2002 made it to Round 3 after wins over Cavan and Offaly (in Rounds 1 & 2), before losing to Mayo. At the end of that year, Quane received an All Star nomination.

In 2005 he won a McGrath Cup title as the team's captain.

In 2004, Limerick made it to Div 1 of the National League for the first time in their history making it to the semi-final before going down once again to Munster rivals Kerry.

Quane was chosen for the Munster Railway Cup football team, and was part of the 1999 winning team (Munster's first win since 1982). He also played with the Irish team in the International Rules Series.

He played his club football with the Galtee Gaels club. Quane won a Lmerick Senior Football Championship with Glencunane Rovers in 1991 and has also won an Intermediate title with Galtee Gaels. He later took part in the first season of RTÉ's Celebrity Bainisteoir.
