= Ciaran McManus =

Offaly Gaelic footballer

Personal information
- Born: Tubber, County Offaly
- Occupation: Engineer
- Height: 6 ft 2 in (188 cm)

Sport
- Sport: Gaelic football
- Position: Midfield
Club
- Years: Club
- 1990s–2014: Tubber
Club titles
- Offaly titles: 1
College titles
- Sigerson titles: 1
Inter-county
- Years: County
- 1996–2011: Offaly
Inter-county titles
- Leinster titles: 1
- All Stars: 0

Ciaran McManus is an Irish former Gaelic footballer who played for the Tubber club and for the Offaly senior county team from 1996 to 2011 and won a Leinster Senior Football Championship medal in 1997 and a National Football League Division 1 in 1998 and Division 2 in 2004.

Before breaking into the senior team he helped Offaly to win the Leinster Under-21 Football Championship in 1995.

He played for Ireland in the International Rules Series in 2001, 2002, 2003, 2004, 2005, 2006 and 2007.

He also played for UCD, winning a Dublin Senior Football Championship in 2002.

At one time McManus returned from Finland and Germany to attend training sessions and to play in games.

In 2004, McManus became involved in a dispute with the Offaly County Board over its selection of a new manager.

== Honours ==
- Leinster Under-21 Football Championship (1): 1995
- Leinster Senior Football Championship (1): 1997
- National Football League, Division 1 (1): 1998
- National Football League, Division 2 (1): 2004
- National Football League, Division 4 (1): 1997
- Sigerson Cup (1): 1995
- Dublin Senior Football Championship (1): 2002
- Railway Cup (4):
