= Tom Kelly (Gaelic footballer) =

Laois Gaelic footballer

Personal information
- Native name: Tomás Ó Ceallaigh (Irish)
- Born: Kellyville, County Laois

Sport
- Sport: Gaelic football
- Position: Centre Back
Clubs
- Years: Club
- 1999–2004 2005 2006–2011: St Joseph's; Round Towers Clondalkin; St Joseph's
Club titles
- Laois titles: 2
Inter-county
- Years: County
- 1999–2010: Laois
Inter-county titles
- Leinster titles: 1
- All Stars: 1

Tom Kelly is a former Gaelic footballer from County Laois.

His club is St Joseph's. He usually played at centre back for Laois and in 2003 won an All Stars Award and was part of the Laois team that won the Leinster Senior Football Championship title for the first time since 1946.

Kelly twice travelled to Australia for the International Rules Series, where he was Ireland's player of the series in 2005.

With St Joseph's, Kelly picked up two Laois Senior Football Championship medals.

In January 2011, Kelly was forced to retire due to a neck injury he sustained the year before.

== Honours ==
Club

- Laois Senior Football Championship (2): 1996, 2000
- Laois All-County Football League (2): 2001, 2010

Inter-county

- Leinster Senior Football Championship (1): 2003
- Leinster Under-21 Football Championship (1): 1998
- All-Ireland Minor Football Championship (1): 1997
- Leinster Minor Football Championship (1): 1997

Individual

- All Star (1): 2003
- International Rules Series Player of the Series (1): 2005
