= Anthony Rainbow =

Irish Gaelic footballer and manager

Personal information
- Born: Kildare, Ireland
- Height: 5 ft 11 in (180 cm)

Sport
- Sport: Gaelic football
- Position: Half-back
Club
- Years: Club
- 1990s–: Suncroft
Inter-county
- Years: County
- 1992–2010: Kildare
Inter-county titles
- Leinster titles: 2
- All-Irelands: 0
- All Stars: 1

Anthony Rainbow is a Gaelic football manager and former player from County Kildare, Ireland. He played with the Kildare county team for almost 20 years, winning two Leinster Senior Football Championship medals, in 1998 and 2000. He played in the 1998 All-Ireland Senior Football Championship final, which Kildare lost to Galway. He won an All Star in 1998. He also won an O'Byrne Cup medal in 2003. He played for Ireland in the International Rules Series in 2001. He announced his retirement after Kildare's defeat to Down in the 2010 All-Ireland SFC semi-final.

In late 2012, he was appointed manager of the senior Carlow county football team, having been a member of the backroom team.

Rainbow was managing Dublin club Ballyboden St Enda's during the COVID-19 pandemic, at which time he was held within County Kildare to stop the spread.

He was part of manager Glenn Ryan's Kildare backroom team from October 2021.

== Honours ==
- 2 Leinster Senior Football Championships (1998, 2000)
- 2 Kildare Intermediate Football Championships (1989, 2007)
- 1 All Stars Award (2000)
- 1 International Rules Series (2001)
