= Brian White (referee) =

Gaelic football referee

Personal information
- Born: 1961/1962 County Wexford
- Employer: GAA

Sport
- Sport: Gaelic football
- Position: Referee

Brian White (born 1961/1962) is a Gaelic football referee from County Wexford. He refereed three finals of the All-Ireland SFC during the 1990s and 2000s.

== Career ==
1991 was White's first year as an inter-county referee and that year he oversaw the Leinster Senior Football Championship final (Dublin against Kildare) at Croke Park. His reputation is a man for "letting the game flow". White refereed the 1997 All-Ireland Senior Football Championship Final, which was Kerry v Mayo. Then he refereed the 2000 All-Ireland Senior Football Championship Final replay of Galway v Kerry. He thus became the first person to referee an All-Ireland SFC final replay without having refereed the drawn game because of a rule change. White's last All-Ireland SFC final was the 2003 All-Ireland Senior Football Championship Final, which was Armagh v Tyrone. He refereed the 2002 Ulster Senior Football Championship quarter-final replay so he knew all about Armagh and Tyrone.

The Irish Times said ahead of the 2003 final: "His performance will be heavily scrutinised because of the increased spotlight on referees in this year's championship, especially since Tyrone's foul-infested semi-final against Kerry." Other gigs involved the International Rules Series. White was referee of the year in 1994, 1997 and 2000.

Derry manager Mickey Moran tackled him in the 2004 championship after Tyrone knocked them out. He got on the wrong side of Colin Corkery in a 2002 All-Ireland Senior Football Championship semi-final, sending the man (top scorer in that year's championship) off when he kicked the ball at White when Corkery was captaining Cork against Kerry, described afterwards as "traumatic", remonstrating with White all game long in an "ongoing feud" but Corkery was kind afterwards calling White "a good referee, one of the top two in my opinion" to try to cool the hot water.

By 2004, when he was 42 years of age, White had refereed the three All-Ireland finals, and had four Vodafone Referee of the Year awards in his back pocket. He also done five Leinster finals; one Connacht Final; one Ulster Final; two National League Finals and one Minor Final. He played in the Senior Hurling Championship and Senior Football Championship for Cushinstown.

In early 2005, he opted to trade football for hurling.
