= Brad Sewell =

Australian rules footballer

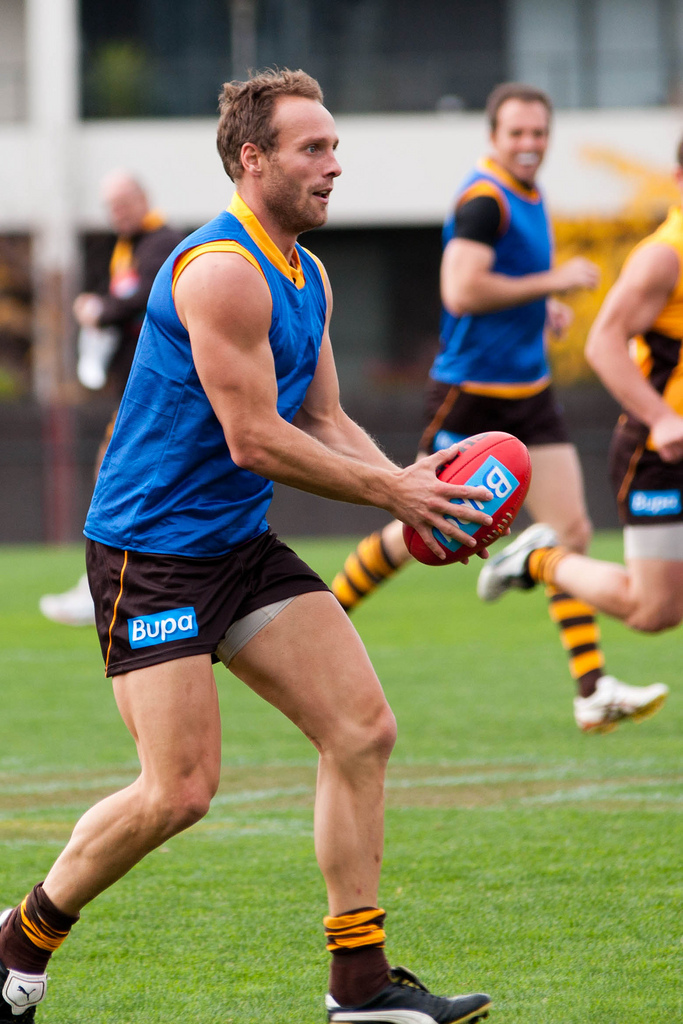
- Sewell training with Hawthorn in 2011

Personal information
- Full name: Brad Sewell
- Born: 2 February 1984 (age 42)
- Original team: North Ballarat Rebels (TAC Cup)
- Draft: No. 7, 2003 rookie draft
- Debut: Round 3, 2004, Hawthorn vs. Port Adelaide, at AAMI Stadium
- Height: 181 cm (5 ft 11 in)
- Weight: 85 kg (187 lb)
- Position: Midfielder

Playing career^{1}
Years	Club	Games (Goals)
2003–2014	Hawthorn	200 (32)

International team honours
Years	Team	Games (Goals)
2008	Australia	2 (0)
- ^{1} Playing statistics correct to the end of 2014.

Career highlights
- 2× AFL premiership player: 2008, 2013; Peter Crimmins Medal: 2007

Brad Sewell (born 2 February 1984) is a former Australian rules football player who played for the Hawthorn Football Club in the Australian Football League.

== Early life ==
Sewell played junior football at the Newlyn Football Club which is part of the Central Highlands Football League and later with the North Ballarat Rebels in the U18 TAC Cup competition. Sewell attended Ballarat High School for his secondary education.

== AFL career ==
Sewell was selected by the Hawthorn Football Club with the 7th overall pick in the 2003 Rookie Draft. 2006 proved to be his breakout year, when he was third in the club's Best and Fairest, collecting 130 votes behind Sam Mitchell and Luke Hodge. He played all 22 games for the season, and kicked his first and second goal in the last match of the year against Geelong.

In 2007, Sewell was a key player for Hawthorn as he went to win the Peter Crimmins Medal, winning by one vote over runner-up Campbell Brown.

On 27 September 2008, Sewell became a Premiership player, after the Hawks beat the reigning premiers Geelong in the Grand Final. Sewell was outstanding on this day coming 3rd overall in the Norm Smith medal voting.

In the final round of 2009, Sewell suffered a fractured cheekbone and eye socket when he was knocked out by a shirtfront from Essendon captain Matthew Lloyd early in the third quarter. This was the turning point in the match, as Hawthorn went on to lose the match and miss the finals after leading at the time of the incident. Lloyd later received a 6-week suspension (reduced to 4-weeks with guilty plea) for the hit; a month after the incident, Lloyd announced his retirement.

In September 2013, Sewell became a dual Premiership player when the Hawks defeated the Fremantle Football Club in the 2013 AFL Grand Final.

2014 was his final season, Sewell twice suffered from hamstring injuries. The first in the final practice match before the season began and then again in round 16, early in a game against North Melbourne. He managed ten games for the season with his last game being the Second Qualifying Final against Geelong.

== Statistics ==
Legend
G	Goals	K	Kicks	D	Disposals	T	Tackles
B	Behinds	H	Handballs	M	Marks

Season	Team	No.	Games	Totals							Averages (per game)							Votes
Season	Team	No.	Games	G	B	K	H	D	M	T	G	B	K	H	D	M	T	Votes
2003	Hawthorn	31	0	—	—	—	—	—	—	—	—	—	—	—	—	—	—	0
2004	Hawthorn	28	6	0	0	27	31	58	13	17	0.0	0.0	4.5	5.2	9.7	2.2	2.8	0
2005	Hawthorn	28	12	0	1	76	81	157	35	15	0.0	0.1	6.3	6.8	13.1	2.9	1.3	0
2006	Hawthorn	12	22	2	2	187	187	374	110	45	0.1	0.1	8.5	8.5	17.0	5.0	2.0	1
2007	Hawthorn	12	24	3	2	206	306	512	124	104	0.1	0.1	8.6	12.8	21.3	5.2	4.3	8
2008^{#}	Hawthorn	12	21	7	8	188	305	493	100	99	0.3	0.4	9.0	14.5	23.5	4.8	4.7	16
2009	Hawthorn	12	19	4	3	209	281	490	83	124	0.2	0.2	11.0	14.8	25.8	4.4	6.5	13
2010	Hawthorn	12	19	1	5	174	219	393	64	121	0.1	0.3	9.2	11.5	20.7	3.4	6.4	6
2011	Hawthorn	12	22	5	3	235	275	510	76	114	0.2	0.1	10.7	12.5	23.2	3.5	5.2	7
2012	Hawthorn	12	24	4	13	309	300	609	59	127	0.2	0.5	12.9	12.5	25.4	2.5	5.3	13
2013^{#}	Hawthorn	12	21	2	6	215	221	436	51	103	0.1	0.3	10.2	10.5	20.8	2.4	4.9	3
2014	Hawthorn	12	10	4	0	102	84	186	30	38	0.4	0.0	10.2	8.4	18.6	3.0	3.8	5
Career:			200	32	43	1928	2290	4218	745	907	0.2	0.1	9.6	11.5	21.1	3.7	4.5	72

== Honours and achievements ==
Team

- 2× AFL premiership player (Hawthorn): 2008, 2013
- 2× Minor premiership (Hawthorn): 2012, 2013

Individual

- Peter Crimmins Medal: 2007
- Australia international rules football team: 2008
- Hawthorn life member
- Box Hill All-Star team (1999–2019)

== Personal ==
Sewell's brother, Myles, won the J. J. Liston Trophy for North Ballarat in 2009. He also has two other siblings: brothers Adam, and sister Mikaela.

In 2011, Sewell completed a Bachelor of Commerce with a Sport Management Degree from Deakin University. In 2017, Sewell graduated from Monash University with a Master's in Business Administration.

In March 2016, Sewell, along with ex-teammate Michael Osborne, launched the Australian Rules Football College. Based in North Melbourne, and based on a US college model, the Australian Rules Football College focuses on developing the football skills of their students, whilst also placing an emphasis on education, through offering certificates in health, personal training, massage, leadership, management and diplomas in business.

Sewell is currently a commentator for Network 7, and occasionally plays for Newlyn in the Central Highlands Football League.
