= Chance Bateman =

Australian rules footballer

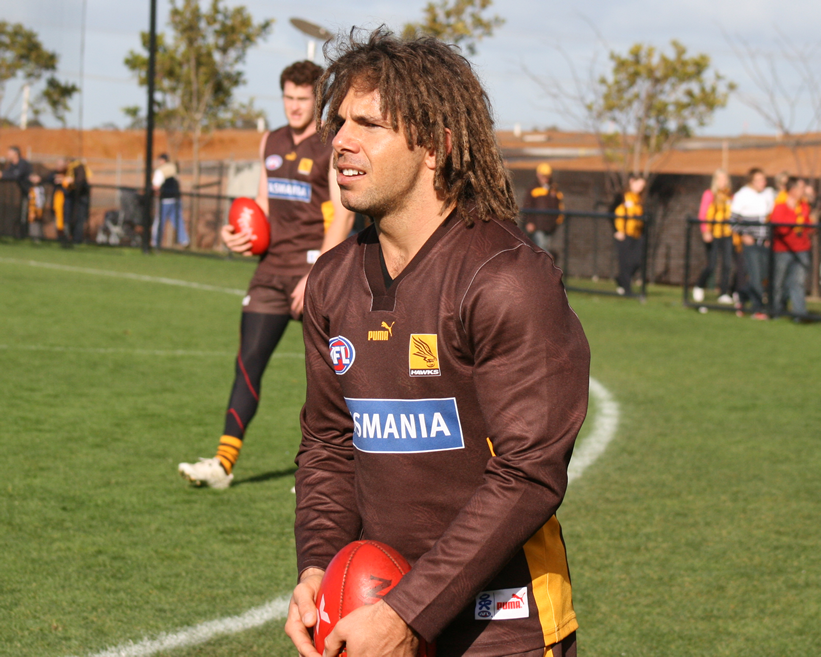
- Bateman with Hawthorn in 2007

Personal information
- Full name: Chance Scott Bateman
- Nickname: Changa
- Born: 21 June 1981 (age 45); Perth, Western Australia
- Original team: Perth Football Club
- Draft: No. 48, 1999 national draft
- Debut: Round 3, 2000, Hawthorn vs. Brisbane Lions, at Melbourne Cricket Ground
- Height: 175 cm (5 ft 9 in)
- Weight: 80 kg (176 lb)
- Position: Midfielder

Playing career^{1}
Years	Club	Games (Goals)
2000–2012	Hawthorn	177 (67)

International team honours
Years	Team	Games (Goals)
2006	Australia	2 (1)
- ^{1} Playing statistics correct to the end of 2012.

Career highlights
- AFL premiership player: 2008; VFL premiership player: 2001

Chance Scott Bateman (born 21 June 1981) is an Australian rules football coach and former player who played for the Hawthorn Football Club in the Australian Football League.

Bateman was Hawthorn's first indigenous player to reach 100 games, first Aboriginal life member, and the club's longest-serving WA recruit. He was a development coach at the West Coast Eagles until the end of the 2020 season.

== Early career ==
Bateman learnt his football during his formative years in York and then with Perth in Westar Rules. He was an under 18 all Australian and in the squad for the Westar state side in 1999.

== AFL career ==
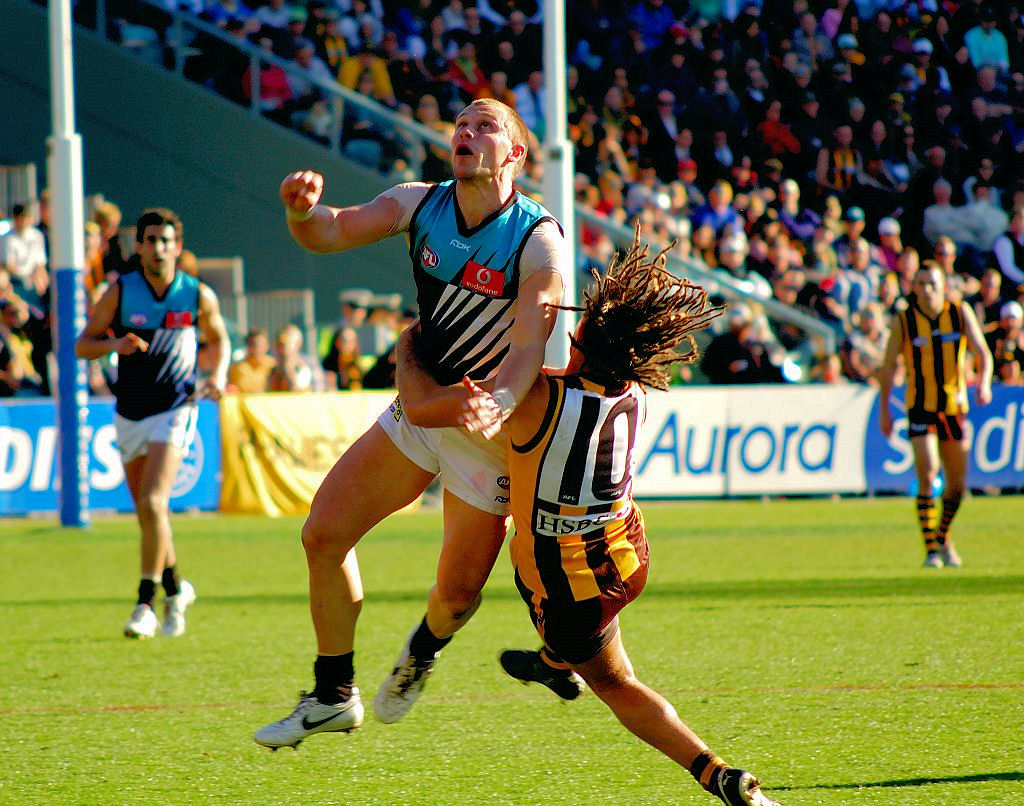
Bateman tackling an opposition player in 2007

Drafted by Hawthorn at pick 48 in the 1999 AFL draft, the Hawks considered themselves lucky as they thought he would have been picked up earlier. His light frame made him a longer term prospect as he would require to develop more physically. His early career was interrupted by a variety of injuries. Each time he bounced back and became a key member of the team.

Bateman said the true sense of worth for Aboriginal players was founded on their family's value and strength and that fact provided him with his toughest times when he lost his sister Candace in a tragic train accident in 2001 he was desperate to return home to be with his parents and was shattered when he could not work a trade with West Coast or Fremantle.

I'd stay at Hawthorn for as long as they'd have me, they've been fantastic for me. You don't really think too much about the milestones as they're coming up, but as you pass them you sort of look back with a bit of pride. I'm our first indigenous life member and to have had a small part in the club's history is pretty special.

In 2006 he managed to play 21 games and came 12th in the club Best and Fairest award. Bateman was known for his trademark dreadlocks. Bateman was one of Hawthorn's most valuable players. His speed and hardness at the ball while playing on the wing allowed the team to play a free flowing brand of game. He averaged 20 possessions a game in his 21 games in 2006 and was hitting top form just before the 2007 season.

His elite speed was recognised and he was named in the 2006 International Rules Series side to tour Ireland.

Bateman said a major career highlight was when he captained the Hawks in an indigenous round victory over West Coast at Launceston in 2007 when the Eagles were led by David Wirrpanda.

Bateman kicked Hawthorn's first goal in the 2008 Grand Final. Bateman had his dreadlocks cut off for charity after the Grand Final victory. The money was donated to the Rioli Fund, set up to improve Aboriginal health throughout Australia.

Along with captain Sam Mitchell, Bateman was the only Hawthorn player to play in all games in 2009. He missed the first game of 2010 because of a one-game suspension for striking Matthew Lloyd of Essendon in the last game of the 2009 season. Bateman was put on Hawthorn's veterans list in 2011.

== Statistics ==
Legend
G	Goals	K	Kicks	D	Disposals	T	Tackles
B	Behinds	H	Handballs	M	Marks

Season	Team	No.	Games	Totals							Averages (per game)							Votes
Season	Team	No.	Games	G	B	K	H	D	M	T	G	B	K	H	D	M	T	Votes
2000	Hawthorn	10	3	1	3	14	2	16	4	1	0.3	1.0	4.7	0.7	5.3	1.3	0.3	0
2001	Hawthorn	10	4	0	0	27	12	39	11	5	0.0	0.0	6.8	3.0	9.8	2.8	1.3	0
2002	Hawthorn	10	11	3	2	95	32	127	29	15	0.3	0.2	8.6	2.9	11.5	2.6	1.4	0
2003	Hawthorn	10	11	2	0	107	45	152	36	16	0.2	0.0	9.7	4.1	13.8	3.3	1.5	2
2004	Hawthorn	10	13	8	2	112	49	161	35	24	0.6	0.2	8.6	3.8	12.4	2.7	1.8	4
2005	Hawthorn	10	12	4	3	165	81	246	52	19	0.3	0.3	13.8	6.8	20.5	4.3	1.6	3
2006	Hawthorn	10	21	5	7	270	146	416	123	22	0.2	0.3	12.9	7.0	19.8	5.9	1.0	6
2007	Hawthorn	10	21	7	6	221	127	348	109	30	0.3	0.3	10.5	6.0	16.6	5.2	1.4	3
2008^{#}	Hawthorn	10	21	9	7	275	161	436	110	52	0.4	0.3	13.1	7.7	20.8	5.2	2.5	9
2009	Hawthorn	10	22	13	14	264	236	500	115	56	0.6	0.6	12.0	10.7	22.7	5.2	2.5	3
2010	Hawthorn	10	18	5	9	168	130	298	72	39	0.3	0.5	9.3	7.2	16.6	4.0	2.2	0
2011	Hawthorn	10	17	10	6	147	102	249	73	36	0.6	0.4	8.6	6.0	14.6	4.3	2.1	0
2012	Hawthorn	10	3	0	0	19	9	28	4	4	0.0	0.0	6.3	3.0	9.3	1.3	1.3	0
Career			177	67	59	1884	1132	3016	773	319	0.4	0.3	10.6	6.4	17.0	4.4	1.8	30

== Honours and achievements ==
Team

- AFL premiership player (Hawthorn): 2008
- Minor premiership (Hawthorn): 2012
- VFL premiership player (Box Hill): 2001

Individual

- Australia international rules football team: 2006
- Indigenous All-Stars team: 2003
- Hawthorn life member
