= Australia national international rules football team =

Australia's senior representative team in International rules football

Australia
- Emblem
- Union: Australian Football League
- Head coach: Chris Scott (2017)
- Captain: Shaun Burgoyne (2017)
First colours

Biggest win
- Australia 69 – 31 Ireland (Republic of Ireland) (2006, 2nd Test)

Biggest defeat
- (Republic of Ireland) Ireland 116 – 37 Australia (2013, 2nd Test)

The Australia international rules football team is Australia's senior representative team in International rules football, a hybrid sport derived from Australian rules football and Gaelic football. The current team is solely made up of players from the Australian Football League.

Although Australian rules football is played around the world at an amateur level, Australia is considered far too strong to compete against at senior level. Hence, selection in the Australian international rules team is the only opportunity that Australian rules footballers have to represent their country. Until 2004, the majority of the men's Australian squad was composed of members of the All-Australian team as well as other outstanding performers from the season. In 2005, the decision was made to select players best suited to the conditions of the hybrid game, which usually resulted in a younger, smaller and quicker team being selected. However this was reverted to the All-Australian model ahead of the 2014 series. For the 2013 Series only, the decision was made to select an all-Indigenous team, known as the Indigenous All-Stars. Because of the severely limited playing pool, the Indigenous All-Stars lost by an aggregate of 101 points over the two Tests, including a record-breaking 79-point defeat in the 2nd Test.

Competing in the International Rules Series, the only team Australia plays against is the Ireland international rules football team. The series has been played intermittently since 1984. Australian under-age teams have been represented in the past, as well as a women's team in 2006. Australia last hosted the International Rules Series in 2017.

== Squads ==
=== 2017 ===
1 Travis Boak (Port Adelaide)
2 Paddy Ryder (Port Adelaide)
3 Michael Hibberd (Melbourne)
4 Jack Gunston (Hawthorn)
5 Kade Simpson (Carlton)
6 Zach Merrett (Essendon)
7 Nat Fyfe (Fremantle)
8 Brendon Goddard (Essendon) – Goalkeeper
9 Shaun Burgoyne (Hawthorn) – Captain
10 Scott Pendlebury (Collingwood)
11 Rory Sloane (Adelaide)
12 Robbie Tarrant (North Melbourne)
14 Joel Selwood (Geelong)
15 Dayne Zorko (Brisbane)
16 Ben Brown (North Melbourne)
17 Neville Jetta (Melbourne)
18 Eddie Betts (Adelaide)
20 Chad Wingard (Port Adelaide)
21 Luke Shuey (West Coast)
22 Shaun Higgins (North Melbourne)
29 Rory Laird (Adelaide)
35 Patrick Dangerfield (Geelong)

- Toby Greene withdrew from the squad after breaking his toe, and Gary Ablett withdrew for personal reasons.
- Selwood missed the first game due to an ankle injury.
- Pendlebury and Ryder only played the first game; Higgins was added to the team for the second game.

=== 2015 (Tour to Ireland) ===
- Hayden Ballantyne (Fremantle)
- Eddie Betts (Adelaide)
- Grant Birchall (Hawthorn)
- Luke Breust (Hawthorn)
- Patrick Dangerfield (Adelaide)
- Dustin Fletcher (Essendon) – Goalkeeper
- Andrew Gaff (West Coast)
- Brendon Goddard (Essendon)
- Robbie Gray (Port Adelaide)
- Dyson Heppell (Essendon)
- Luke Hodge (Hawthorn) – Captain
- Sam Mitchell (Hawthorn)
- Leigh Montagna (St Kilda)
- David Mundy (Fremantle)
- Robert Murphy (Western Bulldogs)
- Nick Riewoldt (St Kilda)
- Tom Rockliff (Brisbane)
- Jarryd Roughead (Hawthorn)
- Nick Smith (Sydney)
- Jake Stringer (Western Bulldogs)
- Harry Taylor (Geelong)
- Easton Wood (Western Bulldogs)
- Coach – Alastair Clarkson

Jim Stynes Medal: Harry Taylor

=== 2014 ===
- Grant Birchall (Hawthorn)
- Travis Boak (Port Adelaide)
- Luke Breust (Hawthorn)
- Patrick Dangerfield (Adelaide)
- Dustin Fletcher (Essendon) – Goalkeeper
- Nathan Fyfe (Fremantle)
- Brendon Goddard (Essendon)
- Robbie Gray (Port Adelaide)
- Brent Harvey (North Melbourne)
- Luke Hodge (Hawthorn)
- Kieren Jack (Sydney)
- Steve Johnson (Geelong)
- Jarrad McVeigh (Sydney)
- Sam Mitchell (Hawthorn)
- Leigh Montagna (St Kilda)
- Nic Naitanui (West Coast)
- Nick Riewoldt (St Kilda)
- Tom Rockliff (Brisbane)
- Joel Selwood (Geelong) – Captain
- Brodie Smith (Adelaide)
- Harry Taylor (Geelong)
- Jobe Watson (Essendon)
- Chad Wingard (Port Adelaide)
- Coach – Alastair Clarkson

Jim Stynes Medal: Luke Hodge

=== 2013 (Tour to Ireland) ===
- Tony Armstrong (Sydney)
- Dom Barry (Melbourne)
- Eddie Betts (Carlton)
- Aaron Davey (Melbourne)
- Alwyn Davey (Essendon)
- Shaun Edwards (Greater Western Sydney)
- Cam Ellis-Yolmen (Adelaide)
- Lance Franklin (Sydney)
- Jarrod Harbrow (Gold Coast)
- Josh Hill (West Coast)
- Lewis Jetta (Sydney)
- Nathan Lovett-Murray (Essendon)
- Ashley McGrath (Brisbane) – Goalkeeper
- Steven Motlop (Geelong)
- Jake Neade (Port Adelaide)
- Mathew Stokes (Geelong)
- Lindsay Thomas (North Melbourne)
- Sharrod Wellingham (West Coast)
- Daniel Wells (North Melbourne) – Captain
- Chris Yarran (Carlton)
- Coach – Michael O'Loughlin

Jim Stynes Medal: Ashley McGrath

=== 2011 ===
- Richard Douglas (Adelaide)
- James Frawley (Melbourne)
- Robbie Gray (Port Adelaide)
- Brad Green (Melbourne) – Captain
- Shaun Grigg (Richmond)
- James Kelly (Geelong)
- Jake King (Richmond)
- Ben McGlynn (Sydney)
- Trent McKenzie (Gold Coast)
- Stephen Milne (St Kilda)
- Angus Monfries (Essendon)
- Robin Nahas (Richmond)
- Mark Nicoski (West Coast)
- Mitch Robinson (Carlton)
- Liam Shiels (Hawthorn)
- Zac Smith (Gold Coast)
- Matt Suckling (Hawthorn) – Goalkeeper
- Andrew Swallow (North Melbourne)
- Jack Trengove (Melbourne)
- Bernie Vince (Adelaide)
- Callan Ward (Greater Western Sydney)
- David Wojcinski (Geelong)
- Easton Wood (Western Bulldogs)
- Joel Patfull (Brisbane Lions)
- Coach – Rodney Eade

Jim Stynes Medal: James Kelly

=== 2010 (Tour to Ireland) ===
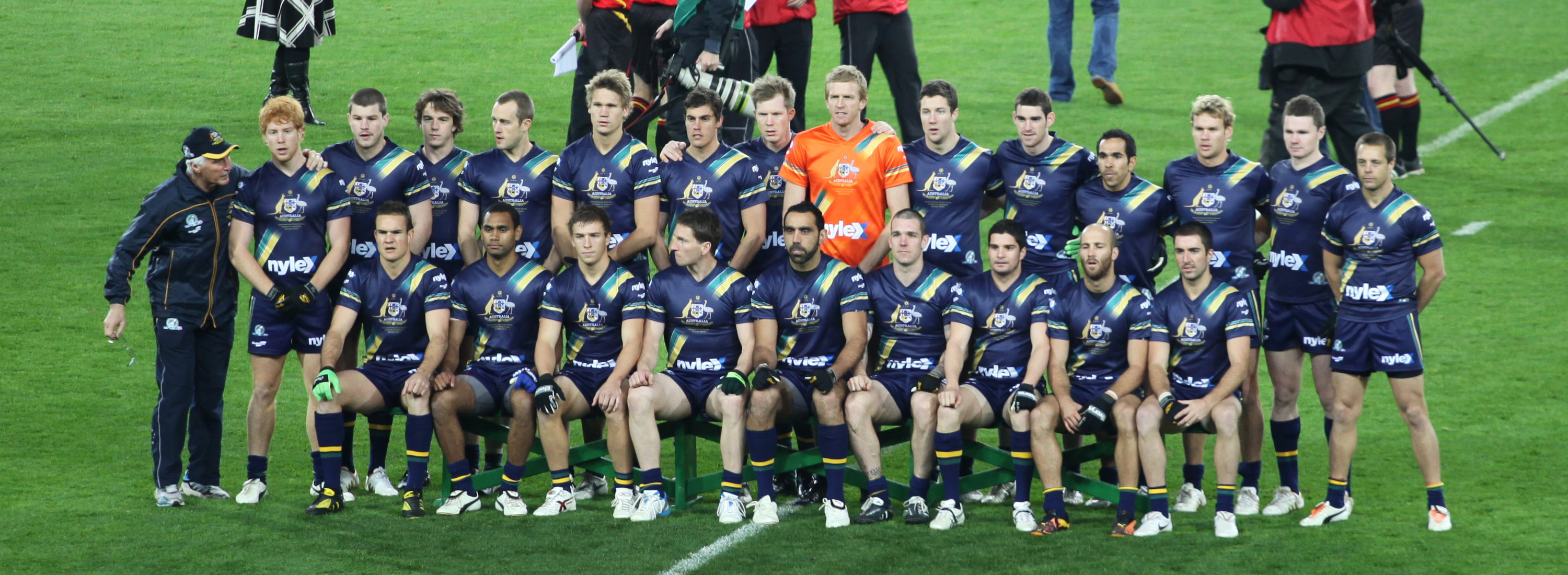
Australia squad, 2010 International Rules Series

- Todd Banfield (Brisbane)
- Eddie Betts (Carlton)
- Matthew Boyd (Western Bulldogs)
- Daniel Cross (Western Bulldogs)
- Patrick Dangerfield (Adelaide)
- Paul Duffield (Fremantle)
- Dustin Fletcher (Essendon) – Goalkeeper
- James Frawley (Melbourne)
- Bryce Gibbs (Carlton)
- Sam Gilbert (St Kilda)
- Tyson Goldsack (Collingwood)
- Adam Goodes (Sydney) – Captain
- Brad Green (Melbourne)
- Garrick Ibbotson (Fremantle)
- Kieren Jack (Sydney)
- Jarrad McVeigh (Sydney)
- Leigh Montagna (St Kilda)
- Liam Picken (Western Bulldogs)
- Jack Riewoldt (Richmond)
- Kade Simpson (Carlton)
- Dane Swan (Collingwood)
- Travis Varcoe (Geelong)
- David Wojcinski (Geelong)
- Coach – Mick Malthouse (Collingwood)

Jim Stynes Medal: Dane Swan

=== 2008 ===
- Nathan Bock (Adelaide) – Goalkeeper #1
- Matthew Boyd (Western Bulldogs)
- Jared Brennan (Brisbane)
- Campbell Brown (Hawthorn)
- Shaun Burgoyne (Port Adelaide)
- Matt Campbell (North Melbourne)
- Ryan Crowley (Fremantle)
- Michael Firrito (North Melbourne) – Goalkeeper #2
- Nathan Foley (Richmond)
- Brent Harvey (North Melbourne) – Captain
- Roger Hayden (Fremantle)
- Josh Hunt (Geelong)*
- Leigh Montagna (St Kilda)
- Daniel Motlop (Port Adelaide)
- Marc Murphy (Carlton)
- Michael Osborne (Hawthorn)
- Scott Pendlebury (Collingwood)
- Drew Petrie (North Melbourne)
- David Rodan (Port Adelaide)
- Max Rooke (Geelong)*
- Brad Sewell (Hawthorn)
- Kade Simpson (Carlton)
- Adam Selwood (West Coast) – Vice Captain
- Dale Thomas (Collingwood)
- Scott Thompson (Adelaide)
- Daniel Wells (North Melbourne)
- Coach – Mick Malthouse (Collingwood)

Jim Stynes Medal: Kade Simpson

*Max Rooke was named in the initial squad, but did not play due to illness. He was replaced in the squad for the second game by Josh Hunt.

=== 2006 (Tour to Ireland) ===
- 1 Barry Hall (Sydney) – Co-Captain
- 2 Nick Davis (Sydney)
- 3 Michael Voss (Brisbane)
- 4 Andrew Raines (Richmond)
- 5 Ryan O'Keefe (Sydney)
- 6 Kade Simpson (Carlton)
- 7 Brett Peake (Fremantle)***
- 8 Brendon Goddard (St Kilda)
- 9 Lindsay Gilbee (Western Bulldogs) **
- 10 Chance Bateman (Hawthorn)
- 11 Justin Sherman (Brisbane)
- 12 Matthew Lappin (Carlton)
- 13 Adam Schneider (Sydney)
- 15 Ryan Crowley (Fremantle)
- 16 Danyle Pearce (Port Adelaide)
- 18 Graham Johncock (Adelaide)
- 21 David Mundy (Fremantle)***
- 23 James McDonald (Melbourne)
- 24 Brent Stanton (Essendon)
- 25 Brendan Fevola (Carlton)*
- 26 Samuel Fisher (St Kilda) **
- 30 Campbell Brown (Hawthorn)
- 31 Dustin Fletcher (Essendon) – Goalkeeper / Co-Captain
- 36 Aaron Davey (Melbourne)
- 37 Adam Selwood (West Coast)
- Coach – Kevin Sheedy (Essendon)

Jim Stynes Medal – Ryan O'Keefe

*Brendan Fevola was an emergency for the first game, but was sent home before the second game due to misconduct in that he was involved in a fight at a pub.

**Lindsay Gilbee and Sam Fisher only played in the first game.

***Brett Peake and David Mundy only played in the second game.

=== 2005 ===
- Coach – Kevin Sheedy (Essendon)
- 2 Chris Johnson (Brisbane) – Co-Captain
- 3 Brett Deledio (Richmond)
- 5 Ryan O'Keefe (Sydney)
- 6 Shannon Grant (Kangaroos)
- 7 Nick Davis (Sydney)
- 8 Daniel Wells (Kangaroos)
- 9 Lindsay Gilbee (Western Bulldogs)
- 10 Nathan Eagleton (Western Bulldogs)
- 12 Matthew Lappin (Carlton)
- 13 Daniel Giansiracusa (Western Bulldogs)
- 15 Luke Hodge (Hawthorn)
- 16 Kepler Bradley (Essendon)
- 18 Troy Makepeace (Kangaroos)
- 21 Heath Black (Fremantle)
- 22 Brent Moloney (Melbourne)
- 23 Andrew McLeod (Adelaide) – Co-Captain
- 24 Trent Croad (Hawthorn)
- 29 Brent Harvey (Kangaroos)
- 30 Jarrad Waite (Carlton)
- 31 Dustin Fletcher (Essendon) – Goalkeeper
- 32 Amon Buchanan (Sydney)
- 33 Russell Robertson (Melbourne)
- 35 Chris Newman (Richmond)
- 36 Aaron Davey (Melbourne)
- 38 Dale Morris (Western Bulldogs)
- 39 Darren Milburn (Geelong)
- 41 Andrew Lovett (Essendon)

Jim Stynes Medal – Andrew McLeod

=== 2004 (Tour to Ireland) ===
- Luke Ball (St Kilda)
- Craig Bolton (Sydney)
- Jude Bolton (Sydney)
- Joel Bowden (Richmond)
- Michael Braun (West Coast)
- Nathan Brown (Richmond)
- Cameron Bruce (Melbourne)
- Joel Corey (Geelong)
- Jared Crouch (Sydney)
- Nick Dal Santo (St Kilda)
- Alan Didak (Collingwood)
- Andrew Embley (West Coast)
- Brad Green (Melbourne)
- Robert Haddrill (Fremantle)
- James Hird – Captain (Essendon)
- Max Hudghton (St Kilda)
- Jason Johnson (Essendon)
- Austinn Jones (St Kilda)
- Brett Kirk (Sydney)
- Adam McPhee (Essendon)
- Mark McVeigh (Essendon)
- Mal Michael (Brisbane) – goalkeeper
- Brady Rawlings (Kangaroos)
- Nick Riewoldt (St Kilda)
- Dean Solomon (Essendon)

Jim Stynes Medal – Nathan Brown

=== 2003 ===
Coach:Garry Lyon

- Leo Barry (Sydney)
- Peter F. Bell (Fremantle)
- Mark Bickley (Adelaide)
- Clint Bizzell (Melbourne)
- Nathan Brown (Richmond)
- Peter Burgoyne (Port Adelaide)
- Matthew Carr (Fremantle)
- Jared Crouch (Sydney)
- Shane Crawford (Hawthorn)
- Barry Hall (Sydney)
- Brent Harvey (Kangaroos)
- Paul Hasleby (Fremantle)
- Lenny Hayes (St Kilda)
- Glen Jakovich – Goalkeeper (West Coast)
- Brad Johnson (Western Bulldogs)
- Chris Johnson (Brisbane)
- Brett Kirk (Sydney)
- Robert Murphy (Western Bulldogs)
- Matthew Pavlich (Fremantle)
- Luke Power (Brisbane)
- Jade Rawlings (Hawthorn)
- Matthew Scarlett (Geelong)
- Adam Simpson (Kangaroos)
- Rohan Smith (Western Bulldogs)
- Daniel Wells (Kangaroos)
- David Wirrpanda (West Coast)

Jim Stynes Medal – Brent Harvey

=== 2002 (Tour to Ireland) ===
- Mark Bickley (Adelaide)
- Craig Bradley (Carlton)
- Nathan Brown (Western Bulldogs)
- Cameron Bruce (Melbourne)
- James Clement (Collingwood)
- Chad Cornes (Port Adelaide)
- Shane Crawford (Captain) (Hawthorn)
- Luke Darcy (Western Bulldogs)
- Tyson Edwards (Adelaide)
- Josh Francou (Port Adelaide)
- Chris Johnson (Brisbane)
- Chris Judd (West Coast)
- Andrew Kellaway Goalkeeper (Richmond)
- Daniel Kerr (West Coast)
- Angelo Lekkas (Hawthorn)
- Cameron Ling (Geelong)
- Stephen Milne (St Kilda)
- Brett Montgomery (Port Adelaide)
- Robert Murphy (Western Bulldogs)
- David Neitz (vice-captain) (Melbourne)
- Matthew Pavlich (Fremantle)
- Matthew Primus (Port Adelaide)
- Matthew Scarlett (Geelong)
- Brad Scott (Brisbane)
- Adam Simpson (Kangaroos)
- Warren Tredrea (Port Adelaide)
- Adem Yze (Melbourne)

Jim Stynes Medal: Andrew Kellaway

=== 2001 ===
- Coach – Garry Lyon
- 2 Darren Gaspar (Richmond)
- 3 Michael Voss – Captain (Brisbane)
- 5 Brad Ottens (Richmond)
- 6 Jonathan Hay (Hawthorn)
- 8 Joel Bowden (Richmond)
- 9 Stuart Maxfield (Sydney)
- 10 Josh Francou (Port Adelaide)
- 11 Joel Smith (Hawthorn)
- 12 Matthew Lappin (Carlton)
- 14 Jason Johnson (Essendon)
- 15 Matthew Nicks (Sydney)
- 16 Warren Tredrea (Port Adelaide)
- 17 Daniel Chick (Hawthorn)
- 18 Matthew Lloyd (Essendon)
- 19 Nick Stevens (Port Adelaide)
- 20 Simon Black (Brisbane)
- 21 Craig Bradley (Carlton)
- 23 Andrew McLeod (Adelaide)
- 24 Darryl White (Brisbane)
- 25 Damien Hardwick (Essendon)
- 26 Adam Ramanauskas (Essendon)
- 29 Brent Harvey (Kangaroos)
- 33 Blake Caracella (Essendon)
- 34 David King (Kangaroos)
- 36 Simon Goodwin – Goalkeeper (Adelaide)
- 37 Adam Goodes (Sydney)
- 44 Nigel Lappin (Brisbane)

Jim Stynes Medal – Matthew Lloyd

=== 2000 (Tour to Ireland) ===
- Jason Akermanis (Brisbane)
- Justin Blumfield (Essendon)
- Craig Bradley (Carlton)
- Nathan Brown (Western Bulldogs)
- Wayne Campbell (Richmond)
- Blake Caracella (Essendon)
- Trent Croad (Hawthorn)
- Simon Goodwin (Adelaide)
- Damien Hardwick (Essendon)
- Brent Harvey (Kangaroos)
- Chris Heffernan (Essendon)
- James Hird – Captain (Essendon)
- Brad Johnson (Western Bulldogs)
- Andrew Kellaway – goalkeeper (Richmond)
- David King (Kangaroos)
- Steven King (Geelong)
- Justin Leppitsch (Brisbane)
- Andrew McLeod (Adelaide)
- Michael O'Loughlin (Sydney)
- Luke Power (Brisbane)
- Brett Ratten (Carlton)
- Mark Ricciuto (Adelaide)
- Rohan H. Smith (Western Bulldogs)
- Scott West (Western Bulldogs)
- Shane Woewodin (Melbourne)
- Adem Yze (Melbourne)

Jim Stynes Medal – James Hird

=== 1999 ===
- Coach – Dermott Brereton
- Assistant coach – Jim Stynes
- 1 Stephen Silvagni – Goalkeeper
- 3 Ben Graham
- 4 Craig McRae
- 5 Nathan Buckley – Captain
- 6 Rohan Smith
- 7 Scott West
- 8 Trent Croad
- 9 Shane Crawford
- 10 Marcus Ashcroft
- 11 Nathan Burke
- 12 Jason Akermanis
- 14 Ben Cousins
- 15 Matthew Richardson
- 16 Scott Camporeale
- 18 Jarrod Molloy
- 19 Michael O'Loughlin
- 20 Clive Waterhouse
- 22 Wayne Campbell
- 23 Justin Leppitsch
- 24 Matthew Allan
- 25 Peter Burgoyne
- 26 Peter Bell
- 27 Andrew McKay
- 34 Ben Hart

Jim Stynes Medal – Jason Akermanis

=== 1998 (Tour to Ireland) ===
- Stephen Silvagni – Goalkeeper
- Ben Hart
- David Neitz
- Shane Crawford
- Rohan Smith
- Sean Wellman
- Nigel Smart
- Mark Ricciuto
- Nathan Buckley
- Robert Harvey
- Wayne Carey – Captain
- Brad Johnson
- Nathan Eagleton
- Jeff Farmer
- Anthony Stevens
- Matthew Lloyd
- Peter Everitt
- Jim Stynes
- Scott Camporeale
- Wayne Campbell
- Nick Holland
- Shaun Rehn
- Todd Viney

Jim Stynes Medal – Stephen Silvagni

== Australian honour roll ==
=== Honour roll ===
Series	Captain(s)	Goalkeeper(s)	Jim Stynes Medal	Coach	Result
1998	Wayne Carey	Stephen Silvagni	Stephen Silvagni	Leigh Matthews	Ireland (128–118)
1999	Nathan Buckley	Stephen Silvagni	Jason Akermanis	Dermott Brereton	Ireland (122–114)
2000	James Hird	Andrew Kellaway	James Hird	Dermott Brereton	Australia (123–98)
2001	Michael Voss	Simon Goodwin	Matthew Lloyd	Garry Lyon	Ireland (130–105)
2002	Shane Crawford	Andrew Kellaway	Andrew Kellaway	Garry Lyon	Australia (101–95)
2003	Shane Crawford	Glen Jakovich	Brent Harvey	Garry Lyon	Australia (101–94)
2004	James Hird	Simon Goodwin	Nathan Brown	Garry Lyon	Ireland (132–82)
2005	Andrew McLeod & Chris Johnson	Dustin Fletcher	Andrew McLeod	Kevin Sheedy	Australia (163–106)
2006	Barry Hall & Dustin Fletcher	Dustin Fletcher	Ryan O'Keefe	Kevin Sheedy	Australia (109–79)
2008	Brent Harvey	Nathan Bock & Michael Firrito	Kade Simpson	Michael Malthouse	Ireland (102–97)
2010	Adam Goodes	Dustin Fletcher	Dane Swan	Michael Malthouse	Australia (102–92)
2011	Brad Green	Matt Suckling	James Kelly	Rodney Eade	Ireland (130–65)
2013	Daniel Wells	Ashley McGrath	Ashley McGrath	Michael O'Loughlin	Ireland (173–72)
2014	Joel Selwood	Dustin Fletcher	Luke Hodge	Alastair Clarkson	Australia (56–46)
2015	Luke Hodge	Dustin Fletcher	Harry Taylor	Alastair Clarkson	Ireland (56–52)
2017	Shaun Burgoyne	Brendon Goddard	Nat Fyfe	Chris Scott	Australia (116–103)

=== Most Australian caps ===
Note: includes players' caps from 1984 – 2017.

Player	Club	Series	Number of Caps
Brent Harvey	North Melbourne	2000, 2001, 2003, 2005, 2008, 2014	11
Terry Daniher	Essendon	1984, 1986, 1990	9
Steve Malaxos	Claremont/West Coast	1984, 1987, 1990	9
Craig Bradley	Carlton	2000, 2001, 2002	9
Gary Pert	Collingwood	1984, 1986, 1987	8
Tony McGuinness	Footscray	1986, 1987, 1990	8
Rohan Smith	Footscray	1998, 1999, 2000, 2003	8
Shane Crawford	Hawthorn	2000, 2001, 2002	8
Nathan Brown	Western Bulldogs/Richmond	2000, 2002, 2003, 2004	7

=== Guernsey ===
The 1984–1990 Australian teams wore a traditional Australian rules sleeveless guernsey in plain gold. The teams of 1998–2011 wore a predominantly navy blue Gaelic football style guernsey, with either a green or gold v or green and gold sash. The Indigenous All-Stars team which represented Australia in 2013 wore a unique Indigenous-styled guernsey. Ahead of the 2014 test match, the Australian guernsey was significantly altered, in favour of a mix of green and gold, with the traditional v-shape.

== See also ==
- Australia women's international rules football team
- International rules football
- Jim Stynes Medal
