= 2003 AFL Rising Star =

Australian rules football award

2003 National AFL Rising Star
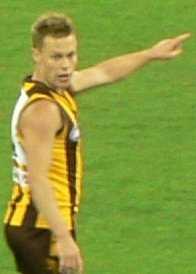
- Sam Mitchell, winner of the 2003 AFL Rising Star award, during the 2007 AFL season
- Sponsored by: National Australia Bank
- Country: Australia
- Rising Star: Sam Mitchell (Hawthorn)

The National AFL Rising Star award is given annually to a stand out young player in the Australian Football League. The 2003 medal was awarded to Hawthorn player, Sam Mitchell.

== Eligibility ==
Every round, an Australian Football League rising star nomination is given to a stand out young player. To be eligible for the award, a player must be under 21 on 1 January of that year, have played 10 or fewer senior games and not been suspended during the season. At the end of the year, one of the 22 nominees is the winner of award.

== Nominations ==
Round	Player	Club	Ref.
1	Sam Mitchell	Hawthorn	
2	Luke Ball	St Kilda	
3	Trent Sporn	Carlton	
4	Jared Brennan	Brisbane Lions	
5	Adam Schneider	Sydney	
6	Michael Osborne	Hawthorn	
7	Brendon Goddard	St Kilda	
8	Ashley Sampi	West Coast	
9	Graham Polak	Fremantle	
10	Jarrad Waite	Carlton	
11	Daniel Wells	Kangaroos	
12	Brad Fisher	Carlton	
13	Byron Schammer	Fremantle	
14	Aaron Sandilands	Fremantle	
15	Ted Richards	Essendon	
16	Daniel Motlop	Kangaroos	
17	Richard Cole	Collingwood	
18	Lewis Roberts-Thomson	Sydney	
19	Marc Bullen	Essendon	
20	Leigh Montagna	St Kilda	
21	Andrew McDougall	West Coast	
22	Ashley McGrath	Brisbane Lions	
22	Matthew Lokan	Collingwood	

== Final voting ==
	Player	Club	Votes
1	Sam Mitchell	Hawthorn	33
2	Graham Polak	Fremantle	26
3	Luke Ball	St Kilda	17
4	Daniel Wells	North Melbourne	12
5	Adam Schneider	Sydney	8
6	Ashley Sampi	West Coast	4
7	Michael Osborne	Hawthorn	3
8	Marc Bullen	Essendon	1
8	Brad Fisher	Carlton	1
Source: AFL Record Season Guide 2015
