= Michael Osborne (footballer) =

Australian rules footballer and coach

Personal information
- Full name: Michael Osborne
- Born: 29 July 1982 (age 44)
- Original team: Labrador (QAFL)
- Draft: No. 11, 2001 rookie draft
- Debut: Round 21, 2001, Hawthorn vs. Adelaide, at Football Park
- Height: 178 cm (5 ft 10 in)
- Weight: 80 kg (176 lb)
- Position: Forward

Playing career^{1}
Years	Club	Games (Goals)
2001–2013	Hawthorn	168 (110)

International team honours
Years	Team	Games (Goals)
2008	Australia	2
- ^{1} Playing statistics correct to the end of 2013.

Career highlights
- AFL premiership player: 2008; 2× VFL premiership player: 2001, 2013

Michael Osborne (born 29 July 1982) is a former Australian rules football coach and player who most recently served as a development coach with the Carlton Football Club in the Australian Football League (AFL). In 2014 and 2015 as a player, before opening The Australian Rules Football College (ARFC) with premiership teammate Brad Sewell, he played with the Hawthorn Football Club.

In 2016, he was assistant coach at Balwyn in the EFL where the club won their 4th premiership in 5 years under the tenure of Daniel Donati.

== Overview ==
Recruited from Labrador, Queensland, Osborne debuted for Hawthorn Football Club in 2001 after being elevated from the rookie list. He played in the Box Hill Hawks's 2001 premiership team that year. While only playing three games in his first two seasons, since 2003 Osborne was a regular selection when not injured. A versatile player Osborne could play as a small defender, midfielder, or forward. In 2005, he was awarded the club's 'defensive pursuits player of the year'. Two years later, Osborne played in 20 of the 22 home-and-away games, was part of Hawthorn's premiership team, and finished 5th in the Peter Crimmins Medal in 2008.

Osborne suffered a season-ending ACL injury in Round 7 of the 2012 season. He was delisted at the end of the season but was redrafted with pick 70 in the 2012 draft. Hawthorn recruitment manager Graeme Wright said: "It's great to have 'Ossie' back on the list officially. He was very gracious in helping us from a list management point of view. We were able to get Jonathan Simpkin onto the list as a delisted free agent by delisting 'Ossie'."

He played 5 senior games in 2013, spending most of the season with Hawthorn's affiliate VFL side Box Hill.

Osborne announced his retirement at Hawthorn's 2013 Best and Fairest count.

Immediately after his playing days were over, he joined Carlton as a development coach on 27 November 2013.

In March 2016, Osborne, with ex-teammate Brad Sewell, they launched the Australian Rules Football College. Based in North Melbourne, and based on a US college model, the Australian Rules Football College focuses on developing the football skills of their students, whilst also placing an emphasis on education, through offering certificates in health, personal training, massage, leadership, management and diplomas in business.

== Statistics ==
Legend
G	Goals	K	Kicks	D	Disposals	T	Tackles
B	Behinds	H	Handballs	M	Marks

Season	Team	No.	Games	Totals							Averages (per game)							Votes
Season	Team	No.	Games	G	B	K	H	D	M	T	G	B	K	H	D	M	T	Votes
2001	Hawthorn	40	2	1	0	3	3	6	2	2	0.5	0.0	1.5	1.5	3.0	1.0	1.0	0
2002	Hawthorn	40	1	1	0	4	3	7	3	0	1.0	0.0	4.0	3.0	7.0	3.0	0.0	0
2003	Hawthorn	40	19	3	3	169	64	233	62	40	0.2	0.2	8.9	3.4	12.3	3.3	2.1	0
2004	Hawthorn	40	17	1	0	106	54	160	50	28	0.1	0.0	6.2	3.2	9.4	2.9	1.6	0
2005	Hawthorn	7	19	8	3	166	91	257	76	49	0.4	0.2	8.7	4.8	13.5	4.0	2.6	0
2006	Hawthorn	7	4	3	4	31	28	59	10	8	0.8	1.0	7.8	7.0	14.8	2.5	2.0	0
2007	Hawthorn	7	14	8	7	103	64	167	60	19	0.6	0.5	7.4	4.6	11.9	4.3	1.4	0
2008^{#}	Hawthorn	7	23	27	10	235	179	414	134	46	1.2	0.4	10.2	7.8	18.0	5.8	2.0	1
2009	Hawthorn	7	17	14	9	146	116	262	73	46	0.8	0.5	8.6	6.8	15.4	4.3	2.7	0
2010	Hawthorn	7	20	17	10	156	103	259	79	55	0.9	0.5	7.8	5.2	13.0	4.0	2.8	0
2011	Hawthorn	7	20	21	10	172	109	281	80	57	1.1	0.5	8.6	5.5	14.1	4.0	2.9	0
2012	Hawthorn	7	7	3	6	45	43	88	20	14	0.4	0.9	6.4	6.1	12.6	2.9	2.0	0
2013	Hawthorn	7	5	3	0	29	20	49	15	13	0.6	0.0	5.8	4.0	9.8	3.0	2.6	0
Career:			168	110	62	1365	877	2242	664	377	0.7	0.4	8.1	5.2	13.3	4.0	2.2	1

== Honors and achievements ==
Team

- AFL premiership player (Hawthorn): 2008
- 2× Minor premiership (Hawthorn): 2012, 2013
- 2× VFL premiership player (Box Hill): 2001, 2013

Individual

- AFL Rising Star nominee: 2003
- Australian international rules football team: 2008
- Box Hill Hawks All-Stars team (1999–2019)
- Hawthorn life member
