= 2015 International Rules Series =

2015 International Rules Series Test
Ireland	Australia
3.11.5 (56)	1.13.7 (52)
	1	2	3	4
IRE	1.5.0 (21)	3.8.1 (43)	3.10.12 (50)	3.11.5 (56)
AUS	0.4.1 (13)	0.6.5 (23)	0.11.6 (39)	1.13.7 (52)
- Date: 21 November 2015, 7:00 pm
- Stadium: Croke Park, Dublin, County Dublin
- Attendance: 38,386
- Umpires: Joe McQuillan (Ireland); Mat Nicholls (Australia)
- Coin toss won by: Australia
- Kicked toward: Nally / Hill 16 End

Broadcast in Australia
- Network: RTÉ2 (simulcast in Australia on 7mate and Fox Footy)
- Commentators: Marty Morrissey (commentator); Martin Carney (expert commentator); Luke Darcy (expert commentator, from Seven Network/Triple M); Tadhg Kennelly (boundary rider)

The 2015 International Rules Series (officially the 2015 EirGrid International Rules Test) was contested between Gaelic footballers from Ireland and Australian footballers from Australia. The 19th series of International rules football since the concept's inception in 1984, Australia entered the test as defending champions, following their 10-point victory in the solitary test match in 2014. The match was played at Croke Park, the headquarters of the Gaelic Athletic Association, on Saturday, 21 November.

As per the previous year, the series was a single one-off test match, with the winner of the test match claiming the Cormac McAnallen Cup. Ireland were the winners of the series, defeating Australia by 4 points.

== Fixture ==
- Test match: Ireland v. Australia, 21 November 2015 at Croke Park, Dublin

== Background ==
=== Irish team ===
Newly elected GAA President Aogán Ó Fearghail had the luxury of choosing a new Irish management team, after the traditional two-year stint for former manager Paul Earley expired at the conclusion of the previous series. In March 2015, the GAA announced 2002 All-Ireland SFC winning Armagh manager Joe Kernan as the new manager of the Irish team.

For us to be able to put on the green jerseys that [Irish soccer and rugby players] wear with such pride, you see the national anthems and the emotion, we’d just love to have that feeling and that opportunity

— Bernard Brogan, Ireland captain

Kernan spoke of a desire to emphasise the skills component of the game in his selection policy. He was joined on the selection panel by Pádraic Joyce, Darragh Ó Sé and Dermot Earley Jnr. On 24 October 2015, the GAA announced that Dublin's three-time All-Ireland SFC winning forward Bernard Brogan Jnr would be appointed captain of the Ireland team for test match against Australia. Speaking of the appointment, Brogan stated "it is both an honour and a privilege to not only represent Ireland, but to captain the national team too. As footballers, opportunities to play for Ireland and pit our skills against athletes from other nations and codes are few and far between and next month we will test ourselves against arguably the strongest ever Australian team to come here." Mayo footballer and two-time All Star Lee Keegan was named vice-captain.

Ireland manager Joe Kernan announced the 23-man Irish squad on 11 November 2015. Footballer of the Year Jack McCaffrey was among nine All Stars selected in the panel. In total 12 counties from all four provinces were represented in the squad, with 2015 All-Ireland champions Dublin leading the list with five players selected.

=== Australian team ===
Australia retained their selection policy of selecting only players who had received All-Australian honours in their careers. The team also retained the services of last year's successful management team, featuring four-time premiership coach Alastair Clarkson and assistants Ross Lyon and Chris Scott.

It's going to be tough. I'm sure [Ireland] will be smarting a little bit after lowering their colours to us last year. They will have looked at the quality of our players and the way that we played and trying everything they can to win this game and get the trophy back in Ireland

— Alastair Clarkson, Australian coach

The Australian team held a training camp at a New York college in the week preceding the test match, in a bid to offer further incentive to players considering accepting an offer to play in the team. Retired 400 game player and perennial Australian goalkeeper Dustin Fletcher underwent a fitness test in September 2015 with the view to concluding his football career by playing in his fifth International Rules Series.

The Australian squad was announced on 16 October 2015. Among the squad was multiple All-Australian and recent Geelong pick-up Patrick Dangerfield, last year's Jim Stynes Medallist Luke Hodge and Hawthorn premiership players Sam Mitchell and Jarryd Roughead. Of the 22-man squad, only four players – Roughead, Andrew Gaff, Dyson Heppell and Jake Stringer – had not represented Australia in International rules football before. Fourteen of the players who represented Australia in the 2014 test match returned for the 2015 version. On 2 November 2015, Port Adelaide forward Chad Wingard, originally selected in the 22-man team, was withdrawn on account of a persistent knee injury. His place in the side was taken by Fremantle forward Hayden Ballantyne.

The Australian management team announced the formation of a 5-man leadership group on 12 November 2015 at the commencement of their week-long training camp in New York City. Harry Taylor, Nick Riewoldt, Robert Murphy, Luke Hodge and Sam Mitchell were named as squad leaders with Hawthorn's Luke Hodge selected as captain of the team. A warm-up match against New York GAA scheduled to be played on 14 November 2015 was cancelled, with the team instead playing an internal scratch match at the training base of NFL franchise the New York Jets.

== Squads ==
- Coach: Joe Kernan (Armagh)

Ireland
Name	Team	Club
Bernard Brogan (c)	Dublin	St Oliver Plunketts/Eoghan Ruadh
Lee Keegan (vc)	Mayo	Westport
Niall Morgan (gk)	Tyrone	Edendork
Colm Begley	Laois	Stradbally
Gary Brennan	Clare	Clondegad
Eoin Cadogan	Cork	Douglas
Mattie Donnelly	Tyrone	Trillick
Eoin Doyle	Kildare	Naas
Peter Harte	Tyrone	Errigal Ciaran
Darren Hughes	Monaghan	Scotstown
Paul Kerrigan	Cork	Nemo Rangers
Jack McCaffrey	Dublin	Clontarf
Ciarán McDonald	Tipperary	Aherlow
Philly McMahon	Dublin	Ballymun Kickhams
Conor McManus	Monaghan	Clontibret
Rory O'Carroll	Dublin	Kilmacud Crokes
John O'Loughlin	Laois	St Brigid's
Aidan O'Shea	Mayo	Breaffy
Michael Quinn	Longford	Killoe Young Emmets
Donnchadh Walsh	Kerry	Cromane
Diarmuid Connolly	Dublin	St Vincents
Paul Cribbin	Kildare	Johnstownbridge
Paddy McBrearty	Donegal	Kilcar

- Coach: Alastair Clarkson (Hawthorn)

Australia
Name	Team
Luke Hodge (c)	Hawthorn
Dustin Fletcher (gk)	Essendon
Hayden Ballantyne	Fremantle
Eddie Betts	Adelaide
Grant Birchall	Hawthorn
Luke Breust	Hawthorn
Patrick Dangerfield	Geelong
Andrew Gaff	West Coast
Brendon Goddard	Essendon
Robbie Gray	Port Adelaide
Dyson Heppell	Essendon
Sam Mitchell	Hawthorn
Leigh Montagna	St Kilda
David Mundy	Fremantle
Robert Murphy	Western Bulldogs
Nick Riewoldt	St Kilda
Tom Rockliff	Brisbane Lions
Jarryd Roughead	Hawthorn
Nick Smith	Sydney
Jake Stringer	Western Bulldogs
Harry Taylor	Geelong
Easton Wood	Western Bulldogs

== Result ==
2015 International Rules Test
Saturday 21 November (7.00pm IST / 6.00am AEDT)	Ireland	def.	Australia	Croke Park, Dublin (Crowd: 38,386)	Video
1.5.0 (21); 3.8.1 (43); 3.10.2 (50); 3.11.5 (56)	Q1; Q2; Q3; Final	0.4.1 (13); 0.6.5 (23); 0.11.6 (39); 1.13.7 (52)	Umpires: Joe McQuillan (Ireland) & Mathew Nicholls (Australia); Television broadcast: RTÉ2 (Ireland); 7mate (Australia)
O'Shea 2, McManus	Goals	Betts
Brogan 4 McManus 3 Connolly, O'Shea, Kerrigan, Hughes 1	Overs	Gray 3 Betts 2, Riewoldt 2 Roughead, Ballantyne, Montagna, Mundy, Breust, Heppell 1
O'Shea, Brogan, McManus, Keegan	Best	Taylor, Mitchell, Breust, Heppell, Betts, Riewoldt
GAA Medal (Ireland): Bernard Brogan Jnr; Jim Stynes Medal (Australia): Harry Taylor; A pre-match ceremony observed the 95th anniversary of Bloody Sunday, which had included a gun battle at the stadium.; RTÉ Broadcast of the Test Match (YouTube)

== See also ==
- International rules football
- Gaelic football
- Australian rules football
- Relationship between Gaelic football and Australian rules football
