= 2008 AFL Grand Final =

Grand final of the 2008 Australian Football League season

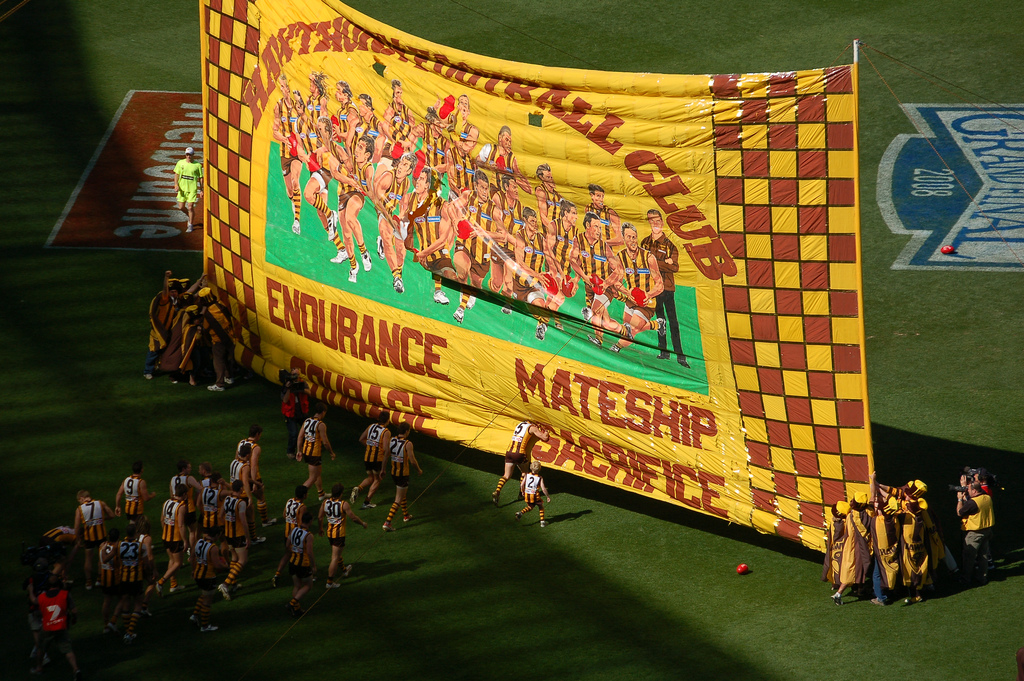
- Hawthorn running through the banner prior to the match. They won the match against the defending premiers, winning their first premiership in 17 years.

Geelong	Hawthorn
11.23 (89)	18.7 (115)
	1	2	3	4
GEEL	5.3 (33)	6.12 (48)	9.18 (72)	11.23 (89)
HAW	5.2 (32)	8.3 (51)	14.5 (89)	18.7 (115)
- Date: 27 September 2008
- Stadium: Melbourne Cricket Ground
- Attendance: 100,012
- Favourite: Geelong
- Umpires: Scott McLaren (11), Michael Vozzo (2), Shaun Ryan (25)
- Coin toss won by: Geelong
- Kicked toward: City End

Ceremonies
- Pre-match entertainment: Powderfinger, AC/DC, Ian Moss, Lucy Durack and Amanda Harrison
- National anthem: Amanda Harrison and Lucy Durack

Accolades
- Norm Smith Medallist: Luke Hodge (Hawthorn)
- Jock McHale Medallist: Alastair Clarkson (Hawthorn)

Broadcast in Australia
- Network: Seven Network
- Commentators: Bruce McAvaney (host); Dennis Cometti (commentator); Nathan Buckley (expert commentator); David Schwarz (expert commentator); Leigh Matthews (expert commentator); Ricky Olarenshaw (boundary rider); Tim Watson (boundary rider)

The 2008 AFL Grand Final was an Australian rules football match contested between the Geelong Football Club and the Hawthorn Football Club, held at the Melbourne Cricket Ground in Melbourne on 27 September 2008. It was the 112th annual grand final of the Australian Football League (formerly the Victorian Football League), staged to determine the Premiers for the 2008 AFL season. The match, attended by 100,012 spectators, was won by Hawthorn by a margin of 26 points, marking that club's tenth premiership overall and first since 1991. Hawthorn's Luke Hodge was awarded the Norm Smith Medal as the best player on the ground.

== Background ==
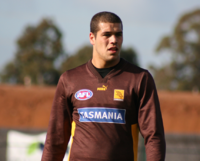
Coleman Medallist Lance Franklin

Geelong, the 2007 premiers, won 21 of 22 games during the home and away season to win its second consecutive McClelland Trophy, and tied the 2000 Essendon Bombers for most wins ever in a home and away season. They were 58-point winners in their qualifying final against St Kilda, earning them a week's rest and a home preliminary final. They then defeated the Western Bulldogs by 29 points to qualify for the grand final. Leading up to the grand final, Geelong had won its past fifteen games.

Hawthorn won its first nine games of the season, and sat atop the AFL ladder at Round 11. They began to lose a few games towards the end of the season, and finished in second place with a record of 17 wins and 5 losses; full-forward Lance Franklin won the Coleman Medal with 102 goals. They convincingly beat the Western Bulldogs by 51 points in their qualifying final, which earned them a week's rest and home preliminary final, in which they beat St Kilda by 54 points. Hawthorn had won four games in a row leading into the grand final, all by more than 50 points. It was the team's first appearance in a grand final since winning the 1991 AFL Grand Final.

The two teams had met only once during the season, in a Friday night game in Round 17. Geelong was missing defending and eventual Leigh Matthews Trophy winner Gary Ablett, Jr., but defeated Hawthorn 12.16 (88) to 11.11 (77). Geelong was the warm favourite to win the grand final, with Hawthorn attracting odds of $3.05 for the win at the opening bounce.

The game was the third grand final meeting between the two teams in their long history, having previously contested in the 1963 and 1989 VFL Grand Finals. It was the first grand final contested by two Victorian-based teams since Essendon and Melbourne met in the 2000 AFL Grand Final.

It was a highly anticipated grand final, eliciting memories of the classic 1989 VFL Grand Final played between the same teams, with Geelong entering the match as the favourites to win. It was attended by 100,012 spectators, the first crowd to exceed 100,000 for a game in the VFL/AFL since the 1986 VFL Grand Final.

== Pre-match entertainment ==
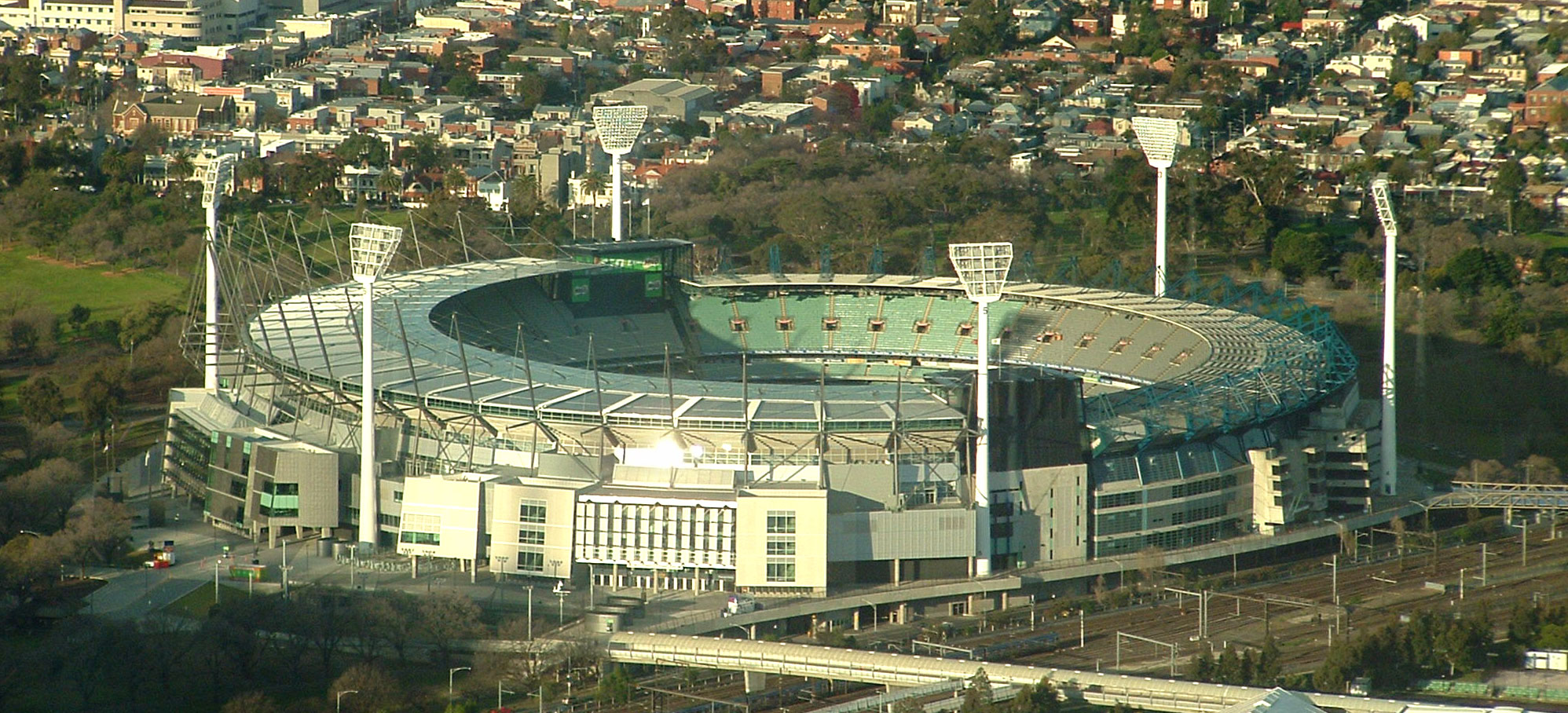
View of Melbourne Cricket Ground

The 2008 decider was telecast by the Seven Network, its first grand final telecast since 2001. The network had only broadcast the match following an agreement that would see them, along with rival Network Ten (which had telecast the event between 2002 and 2007 inclusive), share the rights to the match every year, with the other network broadcasting the pre-season grand final and the Brownlow Medal presentation that year as well.

Included a live performance by Powderfinger of their hit "(Baby I've Got You) On My Mind", interspersed with a rendition of the AC/DC classic, "It's a Long Way to the Top (If You Wanna Rock 'n' Roll)", including bagpipers. Ian Moss also performed lead guitar notes to the tune of "Up There Cazaly". The traditional grand final motorcade, which was controversially omitted from the 2007 pre-match entertainment, returned, honouring the 2008 Australian Football Hall of Fame inductees, individual award winners and retiring players with over 200 games' experience, as well as Olympic and Paralympic gold medallists. The Australian National Anthem Advance Australia Fair was performed by Amanda Harrison and Lucy Durack, stars of the hit musical Wicked.

== Match summary ==
The grand final was played in warm conditions under sunny skies at the Melbourne Cricket Ground with conditions reaching 27 °C.

=== First quarter ===
The first goal of the game was scored by Geelong's Tom Lonergan from a mark. The Hawks opened up a thirteen-point lead with goals from Chance Bateman on the run, Xavier Ellis from a set shot and Jarryd Roughead along the ground from an acute angle. Hawthorn started conceding goals through free kicks, first to Gary Ablett, Jr. then to Max Rooke, to reduce the margin. Geelong looked stronger than Hawthorn at stoppages, but Hawthorn was damaging from rebounds, so neither team could gain the overall dominance in general play, leading to an intense see-sawing quarter of football which saw each team score five goals and Geelong lead by one point at quarter time.

=== Second quarter ===
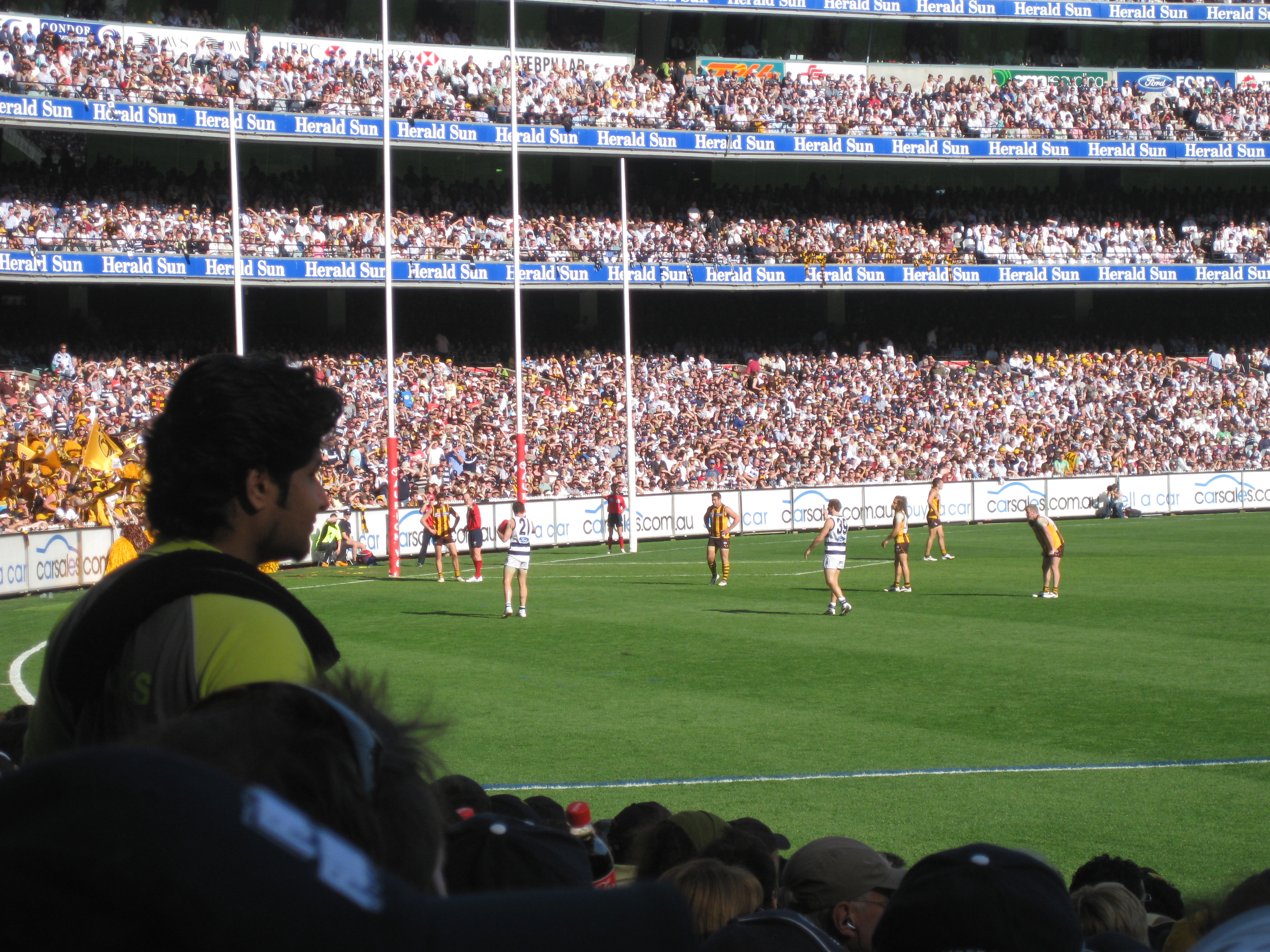
Cameron Mooney's close-range set shot at half time missed for a behind

Geelong began to completely control play in the midfield, winning the stoppages easily and providing their forwards with plenty of opportunities which they wasted. However, a combination between inaccurate goalkicking from the Geelong forwards – the worst of which were a Brad Ottens behind from 15 metres (49 ft) on the run and a Cameron Mooney behind from a 5-metre (16 ft), 45° set shot after the siren – and strong defensive pressure from the Hawthorn defense restricted Geelong to just 1.9 (15).

Meanwhile, Hawthorn scored 3.1 (19) for the quarter, with goals to Cyril Rioli, Mark Williams and Clinton Young, generating almost all of their scoring from rebounds. Hawthorn defender Trent Croad left the field midway through the second quarter with a broken foot. Midfielder Sam Mitchell was reported for making forceful front-on contact on Ablett (the charge was withdrawn at the tribunal). Geelong captain Tom Harley was concussed because of a clash of heads with Hawthorn's Williams and he left the ground.

=== Third quarter ===
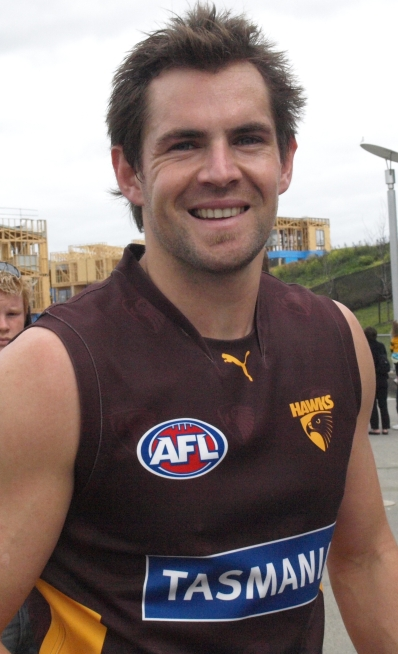
Luke Hodge was awarded the Norm Smith Medal for his effort in defence, including 26 disposals, 9 marks and 5 tackles

The same trends continued into the early third quarter, with Geelong winning in the midfield but faltering in the forward-line. Set shots from Mooney and Lonergan hit the posts. A running goal from 45 metres (148 ft) from Ablett broke a string of eleven consecutive behinds for Geelong, and put them back in front. However, Lance Franklin kicked his first goal forty seconds later from outside 50m with a set shot. The Hawks regained the lead and were never headed again.

In the latter half of the third quarter, Hawthorn started to win stoppages for the first time in the game. Now dangerous from both rebounds and stoppages, the Hawks started to gain the ascendancy, and a crumbing goal from Rioli put Hawthorn two goals up. Stuart Dew went forward, and either scored or assisted with three goals in just 2:47 of playing time late in the quarter to open up a five-goal lead. The Cats scored two goals against the run of play in the final minute of playing time to reduce the margin to 17 points at three quarter time.

=== Final quarter ===
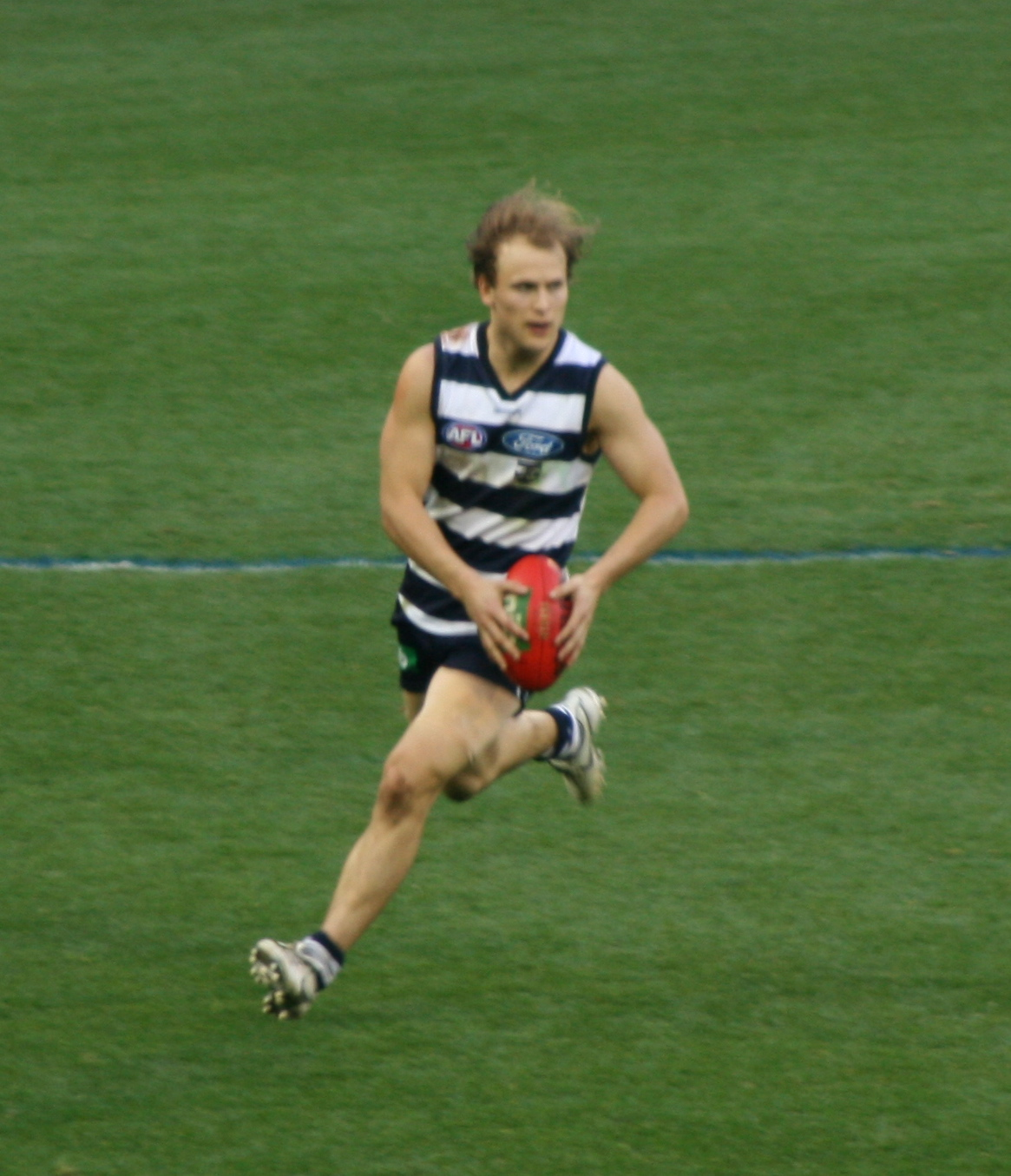
Gary Ablett, Jr. finished as Geelong's best player, racking up with 34 disposals, 3 marks and 5 tackles

The first half of the final quarter was closely fought on the field, with Hawthorn controlling general play, and both teams missing shots at goal. After nine minutes of playing time, Franklin scored the opening goal of the quarter to increase the margin to 21 points. Mitchell goaled less than a minute later. Hawthorn was able to maintain the margin, and eventually won its tenth Premiership by the score of 18.7 (115) to 11.23 (89).

=== Overall ===
Hawthorn's Luke Hodge was the winner of the Norm Smith Medal for best afield ahead of Geelong's Gary Ablett. Playing as a loose defender, Hodge was instrumental in generating and directing the rebounds which Hawthorn dominated throughout the game, and in applying the defensive pressure which helped keep the Hawks in the game when the Cats' midfield was dominating the second quarter.

=== Norm Smith Medal ===
Norm Smith Medal voting tally
Position	Player	Club	Total votes	Voting summary
1st (winner)	Luke Hodge	Hawthorn	15	3,1,2,3,3,3
2nd	Gary Ablett Jr.	Geelong	11	2,3,2,2,2
3rd	Brad Sewell	Hawthorn	5	3,1,1
4th - tied	Stuart Dew	Hawthorn	2	1,1
4th - tied	Joel Selwood	Geelong	2	2
5th	Shane Crawford	Hawthorn	1	1

== Aftermath ==
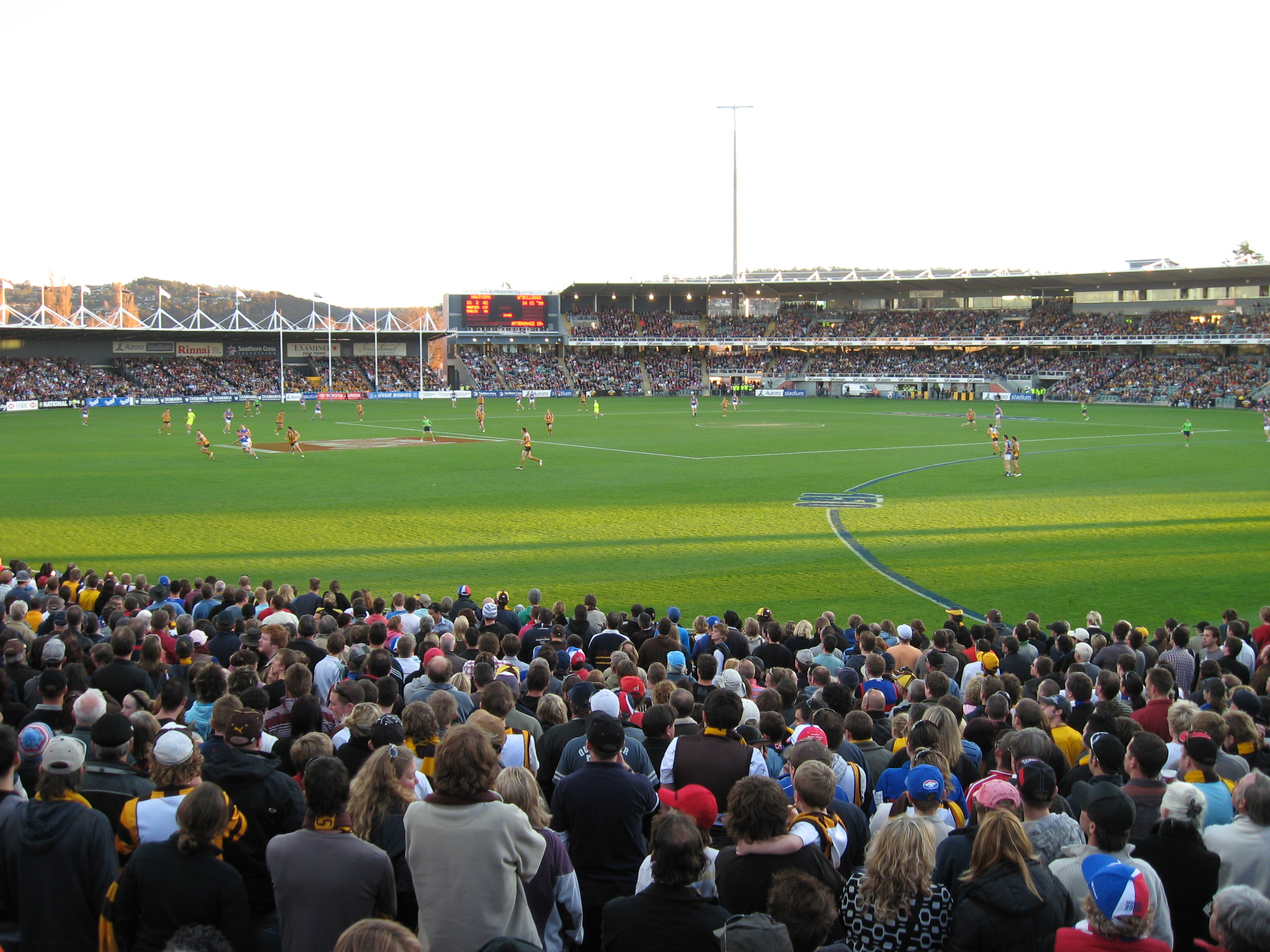
York Park (Aurora Stadium), the site of Hawthorn's Launceston, Tasmania, celebrations. Held in front of the Gunns Stand (right).

By failing to win the grand final, Geelong set the record for the best win–loss record by a non-Premier (breaking the 16–2 record set by South Melbourne in both 1935 and 1936) and for the most home and away wins by a non-Premier (breaking the record of 19 wins set by Collingwood in 1973 and tied by West Coast in 1991).

Geelong's twenty-three behinds included eleven rushed behinds by Hawthorn, some of which were deliberate, and some of which occurred directly from kick-ins. Hawthorn defenders made a clear effort to rush behinds whenever there was any applied pressure from the Geelong forwards, which was reflected in Geelong's inability to defend against Hawthorn's rebounds. This was one of the major contributing factors to a rule change the following year, prohibiting defenders from conceding rushed behinds unless under immediate pressure.

Hawthorn held celebrations for its members in both Victoria and Tasmania, Sunday at Glenferrie Oval and Monday in Hobart and Launceston, in the latter of which it plays four home games each season. Shane Crawford retired after the game setting a record for most games before playing in a Premiership (305 games); the sound bite of Crawford hijacking the microphone and shouting "That's what I'm talkin' about!" as he received his medallion has been replayed and paraphrased frequently over the following seasons. Trent Croad never played again, as he never fully recovered from his broken foot; as a result, he sat out the entire 2009 season and retired before the 2010 season began.

=== Kennett curse ===
In the seasons following the grand final loss, Geelong enjoyed an eleven-match winning streak in matches against Hawthorn, the longest-ever winning streak by the team which lost a grand final against the team which beat it. It included numerous come-from-behind victories and narrow margins, and two kicks after the siren to win by Jimmy Bartel in 2009 (behind to win 99–98) and Tom Hawkins in 2012 (goal to win 118–116).

The winning streak, known as the "Kennett curse", achieved iconic status in the AFL in the intervening years. It is so-called due to comments made by then-Hawthorn president Jeff Kennett prior to the clubs' first re-match in 2009:

What they don't have, I think, is the quality of some of our players; they don't have the psychological drive we have. We've beaten Geelong when it matters.

— Jeff Kennett

The curse was also attributed to a private pact made amongst Geelong players after the grand final loss, and later made public by Paul Chapman, that the Cats "will never lose to Hawthorn again".

The curse ended when Hawthorn defeated Geelong in the first preliminary final in 2013.

== Teams ==
Geelong	Hawthorn

Geelong
B:	2 Tom Harley (c)	30 Matthew Scarlett	8 Josh Hunt
HB:	39 Darren Milburn	7 Harry Taylor	4 Andrew Mackie
C:	14 Joel Selwood	45 Cameron Ling	44 Corey Enright
HF:	20 Steve Johnson	21 Cameron Mooney	3 Jimmy Bartel
F:	35 Paul Chapman	13 Tom Lonergan	27 Mathew Stokes
Foll:	6 Brad Ottens	11 Joel Corey	29 Gary Ablett Jr.
Int:	24 Mark Blake	5 Travis Varcoe	9 James Kelly
Int:	33 Max Rooke		
Coach:	Mark Thompson		

Hawthorn
B:	27 Stephen Gilham	24 Trent Croad	18 Brent Guerra
HB:	14 Grant Birchall	15 Luke Hodge	4 Rick Ladson
C:	3 Jordan Lewis	5 Sam Mitchell (c)	11 Clinton Young
HF:	7 Michael Osborne	23 Lance Franklin	33 Cyril Rioli
F:	6 Mark Williams	2 Jarryd Roughead	30 Campbell Brown
Foll:	39 Robert Campbell	12 Brad Sewell	10 Chance Bateman
Int:	31 Stuart Dew	8 Xavier Ellis	34 Brent Renouf
Int:	9 Shane Crawford		
Coach:	Alastair Clarkson		

== Scorecard ==
Scorecard, according to The Complete Book of AFL Finals.

Geelong vs Hawthorn
Team	Q1	Q2	Q3	Final
Geelong	5.3 (33)	6.12 (48)	9.18 (72)	11.23 (89)
Hawthorn	5.2 (32)	8.3 (51)	14.5 (89)	18.7 (115)
Venue:		Melbourne Cricket Ground, Melbourne		
Date:		27 September 2008 – 2:30 pm AEST		
Attendance:		100,012		
Umpires:		Scott McLaren (11), Michael Vozzo (2), Shaun Ryan (25)		
Goal scorers:	Geelong	2: Mooney, Ablett, Rooke, Lonergan; 1: Chapman, Milburn, Johnson		
Goal scorers:	Hawthorn	3: Williams; 2: Rioli, Dew, Franklin, Roughead; 1: Bateman, Ellis, Brown, Young, Hodge, Mitchell, Ladson		
Best:	Geelong	Ablett, Ling, Selwood, Chapman, Corey		
Best:	Hawthorn	Hodge, Brown, Ellis, Sewell, Crawford, Dew, Rioli, Osborne, Williams		
Reports:		Sam Mitchell (Haw), unduly rough play against Gary Ablett (Gee)		
Injuries:		Geelong: Harley (concussion); Hawthorn: Croad (foot), Young (ankle)		
Coin toss winner:		Geelong (City end)		
Norm Smith Medal:		Luke Hodge, Hawthorn		
Australian television broadcaster:		Seven Network		
National Anthem:		Amanda Harrison and Lucy Durack		

== See also ==
- 1989 VFL Grand Final
- 2008 AFL finals series
