= Trent Croad =

Australian rules footballer, born 1980

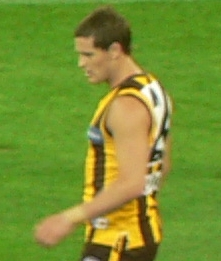
- Croad with Hawthorn in 2007

Personal information
- Full name: Trent Eric Croad
- Born: 9 March 1980 (age 46); Auckland, New Zealand
- Original team: Dandenong Stingrays (TAC Cup)
- Draft: No. 3, 1997 national draft
- Debut: Round 1, 1998, Hawthorn vs. Collingwood, at Melbourne Cricket Ground
- Height: 190 cm (6 ft 3 in)
- Weight: 92 kg (203 lb)
- Positions: Defender, forward

Playing career^{1}
Years	Club	Games (Goals)
1998–2001	Hawthorn	84 (80)
2002–2003	Fremantle	38 (60)
2004–2010	Hawthorn	100 (49)
Total		222 (189)

Representative team honours
Years	Team	Games (Goals)
1999–2008	Victoria	2 (0)

International team honours
1999–2005	Australia	6
- ^{1} Playing statistics correct to the end of 2008.

Career highlights
- AFL premiership player: 2008; All-Australian team: 2005; Fremantle leading goalkicker: 2002

Trent Eric Croad (born 9 March 1980) is a former professional Australian rules footballer who played for the Hawthorn Football Club and Fremantle Football Club in the Australian Football League (AFL).

During his 222-game AFL career, he achieved some of the Australian Football League's highest honours including an AFL premiership medallion, All-Australian selection, and representing Australia and Victoria on multiple occasions.

== Early life ==
Born in Auckland, New Zealand, to mother and father Bruce, and the grandson of All Black Eric Boggs Croad migrated with his family to Australia and grew up in Narre Warren in Victoria. He began playing at a young age with Endeavour Hills and the Narre Warren Junior Football Club and attended De La Salle College, Malvern.

He was scouted by recruiters as a 17-year-old and nominated for the 1997 AFL draft. Croad was invited to the AFL Draft camp where he set the draft camp record for a standing vertical jump at 83 cm, which remained for at least a decade.

== AFL career ==
=== Hawthorn ===
Hawthorn picked up Croad with the third overall selection in the draft. He started out as a defender, playing at either centre half-back or fullback. But he showed his versatility as his career went on, being able to play in any number of key positions.

=== Fremantle ===
Croad was traded from Hawthorn to Fremantle at the end of 2001. The picks given up by Fremantle were used by Hawthorn to select former Hawthorn stars Luke Hodge and Sam Mitchell, whilst Luke McPharlin joined Croad in moving west. While Croad was reasonable but not spectacular at the Dockers, in 2002, he was Fremantle's leading goalkicker with 42 goals. The following season Croad lost confidence and kicked 18 goals. He cited homesickness and asked to be traded back to Victoria at the end of 2003.

=== Return to Hawthorn ===
He was traded back to Hawthorn, this time only in return for pick 10, which was used by Fremantle to select Ryley Dunn. Croad was told that he would be the centre half back, with a regular position his form improved once he went back to the Hawks, winning All-Australian selection in 2005.

Croad relished the responsibility of being the senior man down back being strong, athletic type who took the oppositions best forward each week. During the second quarter of the 2008 Grand Final, Croad broke his left foot, and leaving the ground with the aid of trainers he still managed to lay a bump on Geelong's Joel Selwood before playing no further part in the game. Hawthorn went on to win the match and Croad earned his first premiership medallion in over 200 games of AFL football.

Croad missed the entire 2009 season due to his 2008 Grand Final injury, and on 6 January 2010 he announced his retirement after his surgeon warned him that he might permanently lose all function in his left foot if he broke it again.

== Personal life ==
In October 2006, Croad married Tanya Stewart, and had two daughters, Kiera (born July 2007) and Sierra (born October 2009). Croad became engaged to Kym Valentine in March 2015. In November, Valentine and Croad confirmed they were expecting their first child together. Valentine gave birth to a son named Phoenix in March 2016. Valentine and Croad split December 2017.

Croad has been in a relationship with Kate Jesaulenko, daughter of AFL Legend Alex Jesaulenko, since 2018.

Croad currently works as a manager in landscaping.

Trent Croad married Kate Jesaulenko, daughter of Carlton Legend, Alex Jesaulenko, 12 April 2025.

== Controversy ==
As part of an investigation by the Australian Crime Commission into drugs and organised crime in Australian sport, Croad was named by Fairfax Media newspapers as being involved in a peptide supply deal linked to the Comanchero Motorcycle Club, an outlaw motorcycle gang. Croad announced that he would sue Fairfax Media for defamation over the article.

== Statistics ==
Legend
G	Goals	K	Kicks	D	Disposals	T	Tackles
B	Behinds	H	Handballs	M	Marks

Season	Team	No.	Games	Totals							Averages (per game)							Votes
Season	Team	No.	Games	G	B	K	H	D	M	T	G	B	K	H	D	M	T	Votes
1998	Hawthorn	24	17	4	4	78	21	99	37	15	0.2	0.2	4.6	1.2	5.8	2.2	0.9	0
1999	Hawthorn	24	21	16	10	200	70	270	102	22	0.8	0.5	9.5	3.3	12.9	4.9	1.0	6
2000	Hawthorn	24	22	33	24	228	88	316	127	9	1.5	1.1	10.4	4.0	14.4	5.8	0.4	7
2001	Hawthorn	24	24	27	25	221	91	312	115	32	1.1	1.0	9.2	3.8	13.0	4.8	1.3	1
2002	Fremantle	24	21	42	34	167	38	205	74	18	2.0	1.6	8.0	1.8	9.8	3.5	0.9	2
2003	Fremantle	24	17	18	20	128	40	168	43	28	1.1	1.2	7.5	2.4	9.9	2.5	1.6	0
2004	Hawthorn	24	21	7	8	211	79	290	111	26	0.3	0.4	10.0	3.8	13.8	5.3	1.2	2
2005	Hawthorn	24	21	14	12	214	152	366	127	21	0.7	0.6	10.2	7.2	17.4	6.0	1.0	3
2006	Hawthorn	24	18	18	13	150	84	234	106	18	1.0	0.7	8.3	4.7	13.0	5.9	1.0	3
2007	Hawthorn	24	20	10	8	136	110	246	106	13	0.5	0.4	6.8	5.5	12.3	5.3	0.7	0
2008^{#}	Hawthorn	24	20	0	0	111	90	201	87	14	0.0	0.0	5.6	4.5	10.1	4.4	0.7	1
2009	Hawthorn	24	0	—	—	—	—	—	—	—	—	—	—	—	—	—	—	0
Career			222	189	158	1844	863	2707	1035	216	0.9	0.7	8.3	3.9	12.2	4.7	1.0	25

== Honours and achievements ==
Team

• Marrying Kate Jesaulenko

• Hosting Girls Night - 24th April 2026

- AFL premiership player (Hawthorn): 2008

Individual

- All-Australian team: 2005
- Fremantle leading goalkicker: 2002
- AFL Rising Star nominee: 1998
- 3× Australia international rules football team: 1999, 2000, 2005
- Hawthorn life member
