= Luke Hodge =

Australian rules footballer (born 1984)

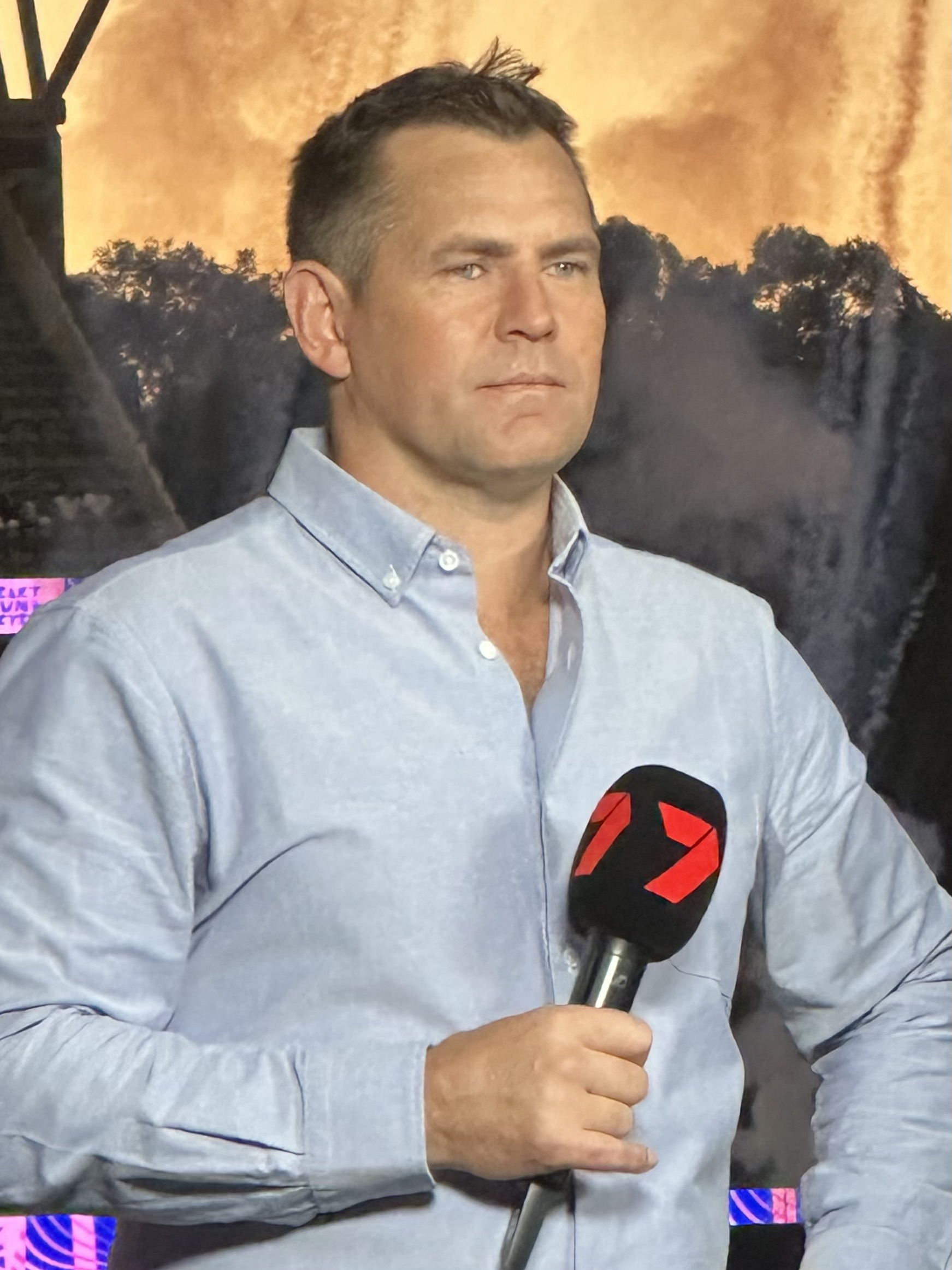
- Hodge in April 2025

Personal information
- Full name: Luke Hodge
- Nickname: The General
- Born: 15 June 1984 (age 42); Colac, Victoria, Australia
- Original team: Geelong Falcons (TAC Cup)
- Draft: No. 1 (PP), 2001 national draft
- Debut: Round 5, 2002, Hawthorn vs. Richmond, at Melbourne Cricket Ground
- Height: 186 cm (6 ft 1 in)
- Weight: 92 kg (203 lb)
- Position: Midfielder / defender

Playing career
Years	Club	Games (Goals)
2002–2017	Hawthorn	305 (193)
2018–2019	Brisbane Lions	41 (1)
Total		346 (194)

International team honours
Years	Team	Games (Goals)
2005–2015	Australia	4 (0)

Career highlights
- 4× AFL premiership player: 2008, 2013–2015 (c); 2× Norm Smith Medal: 2008, 2014; 3× All-Australian team: 2005, 2008, 2010 (c); Hawthorn captain: 2011–2016; 2× Peter Crimmins Medal: 2005, 2010; AFLPA best captain award: 2014; AFLPA Madden Medal: 2019; Australian Football Hall of Fame inductee: 2025; Signature

Luke Hodge (born 15 June 1984) is a former Australian rules football player who played with the Hawthorn Football Club and the Brisbane Lions in the Australian Football League (AFL). He played for the Hawthorn Football Club from 2002 to 2017, captaining the club from 2011 to 2016. In 2018, Hodge moved to the Brisbane Lions, before retiring in 2019.

Hodge started his career playing on the half-back flank but as his career progressed he has been known to push up into the midfield. He is a four-time premiership player, three-time premiership captain and a two-time Norm Smith Medallist. Hodge is widely regarded as one of the most respected players, in particular as a captain, to have ever participated in the sport.

As of 2023, Hodge has played the most VFL/AFL games of any number-one draft pick (346 games played), is the only number-one draft pick to win a Norm Smith Medal, is one of just four number-one draft picks to have won a premiership, and has won the most premierships of any number-one draft pick (4).

== Early life ==
Hodge was born and raised in the Victorian town of Colac. He supported Richmond during his childhood, with his favourite player being Matthew Richardson. He grew up playing football for local clubs Colac Imperials and Colac Tigers, before joining representative program Geelong Falcons.

== AFL career ==
=== Hawthorn (2002–2017) ===
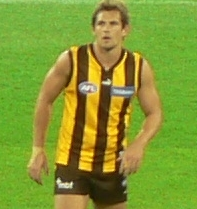
Hodge playing for Hawthorn in 2007

Hodge played as a half-back flanker and midfielder during his playing career. Recruited from the Geelong Falcons Under 18 team, Hodge made his debut in 2002.

Hodge was recruited from the Geelong Falcons Under-18 Football Club, and in 2001 nominated for the 2001 AFL draft. He was the number-one draft choice of Hawthorn Football Club (which had been traded from Fremantle for Trent Croad and Luke McPharlin). Throughout his career he was often compared with Chris Judd, who was chosen with the third selection in the same draft.

Hodge made his debut in 2002 alongside mature age recruit Sam Mitchell from the Box Hill Hawks, who got traded to Fremantle alongside Luke in return for Trent Croad and Luke McPharlin

He was named in the 2005 All-Australian team and in the International Rules team for Australia.

Hodge was named sole vice-captain of the Hawthorn Football Club in October 2007.

He was named in the 2008 All-Australian team and in the International Rules team for Australia.

Hodge won the Norm Smith Medal for being the best player on the ground during the 2008 AFL Grand Final.

Hodge became the captain of the club after Sam Mitchell handed over the captaincy prior to the 2010 Peter Crimmins Medal count.

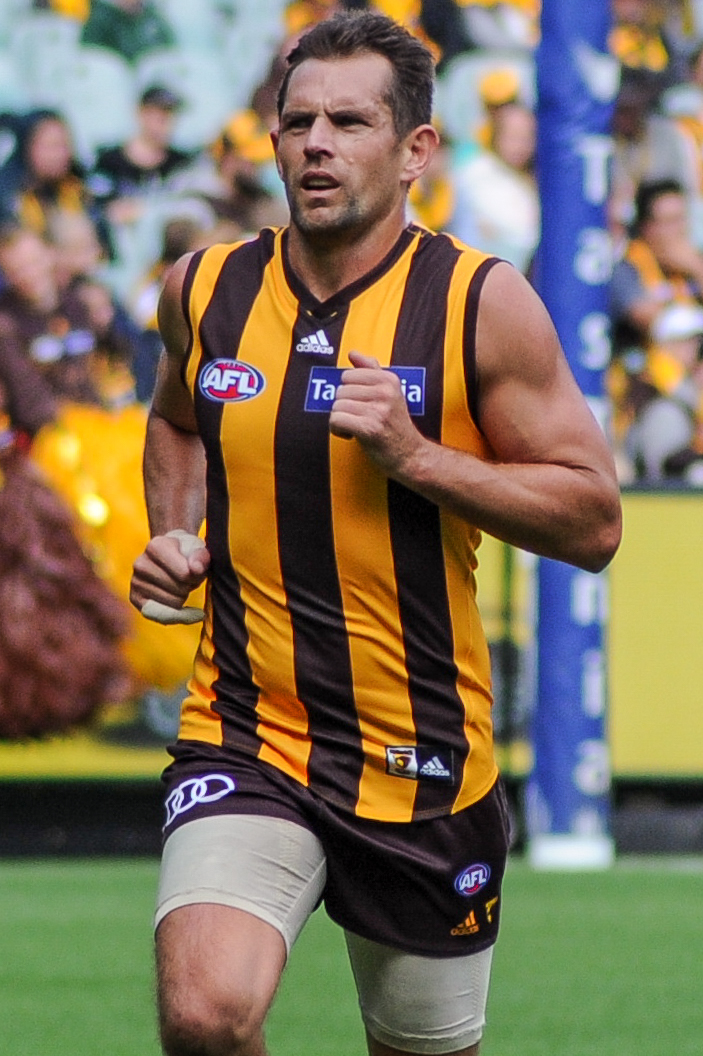
Hodge playing for Hawthorn in 2017

Hodge played only eight home and away games in 2012 due to a Posterior cruciate ligament injury. Returning after a brief illness that kept him out of the preliminary final, he led his side in the 2012 AFL Grand Final but didn't have a major influence on the result.

More post-season surgery followed and he missed the first game of the 2013 season, but he played the majority of the season finishing fifth in the club's Peter Crimmins Medal award. Hodge played in the 2013 AFL Grand Final against Fremantle Dockers and was listed as one of his team's best players on the day. Hawthorn's victory allowed him to claim his second Premiership and his first Premiership as a captain.

Hodge had another consistent year in 2014. He played his 250th career game in the Grand Final, with the Hawks defeating the Sydney Swans to win their 12th premiership. In the game, Hodge became only the third player (after Gary Ayres and Andrew McLeod) to win two Norm Smith Medals, and captained the side to his third premiership; his second as captain.

When the Hawks devoted the first choice in the 2001 NAB AFL National Draft to Luke Hodge they got not just a great player but a great leader, too.

— Leigh Matthews, Hawthorn Great and four-time Premiership coach

Hodge was suspended for two weeks in round 21, 2015 by the Match Review Panel (MRP) for an incident in which made contact with Chad Wingard in close proximity to the behind post.

Hodge's history of strong performances in finals, in particular during Hawthorn's run of three consecutive premierships in 2013, 2014 and 2015 has led to members of the media, including commentator Bruce McAvaney, to dub him "Mister September", after the month in which AFL finals traditionally take place.

Hodge announced in July 2017 that he would retire at the end of the season. In Hodge's last game for Hawthorn, he had 14 disposals in a 9-point win over the Western Bulldogs.

=== Brisbane Lions (2018–2019) ===
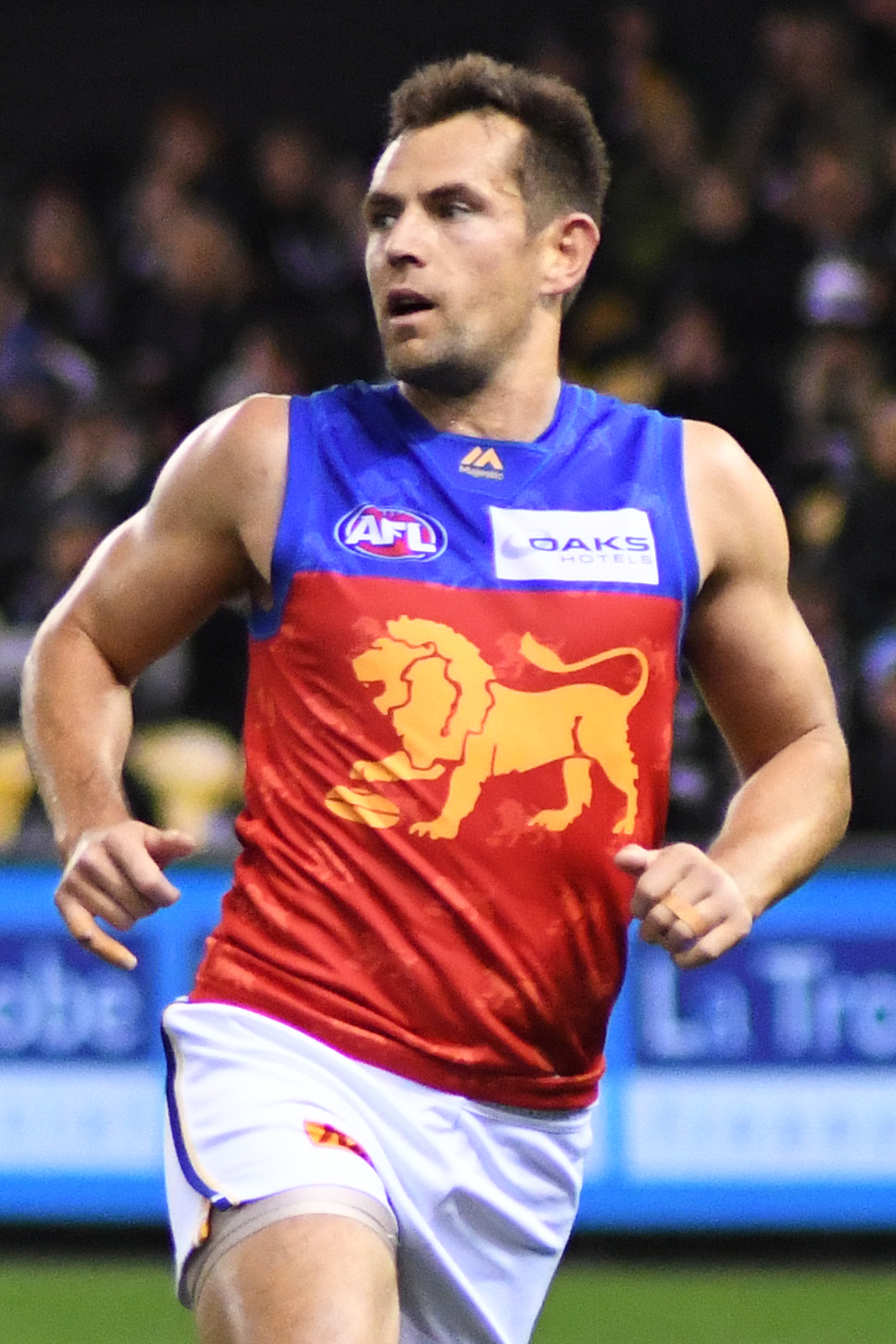
Hodge playing for the Brisbane Lions in 2018

In October 2017, Hawthorn confirmed media speculation that Hodge would seek a move to Brisbane Lions in the forthcoming trade period. He was officially traded Brisbane during the trade period.

After an impressive 2018 season participating in 19 senior matches, averaging just below 20 disposals and an 80% disposal efficiency with no reported injuries apart from a minor calf injury, it was confirmed that Hodge would play on in 2019. He has received much praise from teammates, staff of the club, and media alike for his significant impact on the team, noting his outstanding leadership both on and off the field continuing on from his time at Hawthorn.

== Statistics ==
Legend
G	Goals	K	Kicks	D	Disposals	T	Tackles
B	Behinds	H	Handballs	M	Marks
#	Played in that season's premiership team	†	Led the league for the season

Season	Team	No.	Games	Totals							Averages (per game)							Votes
Season	Team	No.	Games	G	B	K	H	D	M	T	G	B	K	H	D	M	T	Votes
2002	Hawthorn	15	15	9	5	157	76	233	57	24	0.6	0.3	10.5	5.1	15.5	3.8	1.6	1
2003	Hawthorn	15	15	10	11	121	73	194	55	39	0.7	0.7	8.1	4.9	12.9	3.7	2.6	4
2004	Hawthorn	15	15	14	11	159	76	235	62	56	0.9	0.7	10.6	5.1	15.7	4.1	3.7	4
2005	Hawthorn	15	21	9	15	347	234	581	112	59	0.4	0.7	16.5†	11.1	27.7	5.3	2.8	15
2006	Hawthorn	15	22	6	9	313	199	512	89	90	0.3	0.4	14.2	9.0	23.3	4.0	4.1	4
2007	Hawthorn	15	24	23	14	319	222	541	130	96	1.0	0.6	13.3	9.3	22.5	5.4	4.0	16
2008^{#}	Hawthorn	15	20	20	8	290	171	461	114	70	1.0	0.4	14.5	8.6	23.1	5.7	3.5	2
2009	Hawthorn	15	19	10	5	234	190	424	71	68	0.5	0.3	12.3	10.0	22.3	3.7	3.6	7
2010	Hawthorn	15	22	15	12	335	209	544	89	125	0.7	0.5	15.2	9.5	24.7	4.0	5.7	16
2011	Hawthorn	15	22	19	18	325	209	534	106	76	0.9	0.8	14.8	9.5	24.3	4.8	3.5	17
2012	Hawthorn	15	10	9	6	121	70	191	44	18	0.9	0.6	12.1	7.0	19.1	4.4	1.8	2
2013^{#}	Hawthorn	15	23	11	11	349	152	501	115	81	0.5	0.5	15.2	6.6	21.8	5.0	3.5	15
2014^{#}	Hawthorn	15	22	12	9	370	181	551	130	79	0.5	0.4	16.8	8.2	25.0	5.9	3.6	12
2015^{#}	Hawthorn	15	21	21	8	366	196	562	130	93	1.0	0.4	17.4	9.3	26.8	6.2	4.4	13
2016	Hawthorn	15	15	4	3	226	117	343	85	48	0.3	0.2	15.1	7.8	22.9	5.7	3.2	3
2017	Hawthorn	15	19	1	2	276	164	440	119	47	0.1	0.1	14.5	8.6	23.2	6.3	2.5	0
2018	Brisbane Lions	2	19	1	1	248	122	370	121	38	0.1	0.1	13.1	6.4	19.5	6.4	2.0	0
2019	Brisbane Lions	2	22	0	2	278	94	372	128	39	0.0	0.1	12.6	4.3	16.9	5.8	1.8	0
Career			346	194	150	4834	2755	7589	1757	1146	0.6	0.4	14.0	8.0	21.9	5.1	3.3	131

== Honours and achievements ==
Team

- 4× AFL premiership player (Hawthorn): 2008, 2013, 2014, 2015
- 2× Minor premiership (Hawthorn): 2012, 2013
- TAC Cup Premiership (Geelong Falcons): 2000

Individual

- 3× AFL premiership captain: 2013, 2014, 2015
- 2× Norm Smith Medal: 2008, 2014
- 3× All-Australian team: 2005, 2008, 2010
- All-Australian team captain: 2010
- Hawthorn captain: 2011–2016
- 2× Peter Crimmins Medal: 2005, 2010
- AFLPA Best Captain Award: 2014
- AFLPA Madden Medal: 2019
- 3× Australian international rules football team: 2005, 2014, 2015
- Jim Stynes medal: 2014
- AFL Rising Star nominee: 2002
- Ron Barassi Medal (MVP in U18 IR Series): 2001
- U18 International Rules Representative: 2001
- AFL/AIS Academy: 2001
- Australian Football Hall of Fame inductee: 2025
- Hawthorn Hall of Fame inductee: 2024

== Personal life ==
Hodge married long-time girlfriend since high school, Lauren Kirkman, in 2009 and has four sons, Cooper, Chase, Leo and Tanner.

He is a first cousin of Melbourne Vixens netballer Zara Walters.

He earned the nickname 'The General' (which would later be the title of his 2017 autobiography) for his leadership abilities both on and off the field.

On 9 February 2020, Hodge participated in the ten-overs-a-side Bushfire Cricket Bash. Playing for Ricky Ponting's XI, Hodge scored 11* from 4 balls batting at seven, hitting two boundaries off the final over (which was bowled by golfer Cameron Smith). He then bowled the fourth and sixth overs of Adam Gilchrist's XI's innings, and bowled Gilchrist with his second delivery, finishing with 1/8.

== Media career ==
Luke Hodge appears regularly on a Melbourne radio station segment during the football season. In 2011, Hodge competed in the third season of the Channel Seven television series Australia's Greatest Athlete. He also made special guest appearances on Channel Seven's Football coverage while still playing as a special comments commentator from the 2016 season onward. From the 2020 season, he joined the network's Friday night commentary team on a permanent basis while remaining based in Brisbane.
