= Rohan Smith =

Australian rules footballer (born 1973)

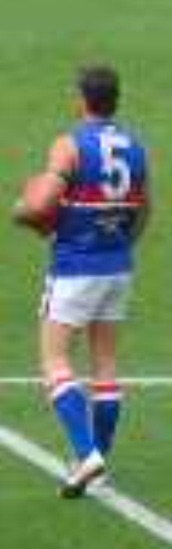

Personal information
- Full name: Rohan Smith
- Born: 31 May 1973 (age 53); Yarraville, Victoria
- Original team: Kingsville
- Debut: Round 1, 1992, Footscray vs. Adelaide, at Football Park
- Height: 184 cm (6 ft 0 in)
- Weight: 80 kg (176 lb)
- Position: Utility

Playing career^{1}
Years	Club	Games (Goals)
1992–2006	Western Bulldogs/Footscray	300 (254)
- ^{1} Playing statistics correct to the end of 2006.

Career highlights
- All-Australian: 1997, 2003; International Rules series: 1998, 1999, 2000, 2003; E. J. Whitten Medal: 1998

Rohan H. Smith (born 31 May 1973) is a former Australian rules footballer in the Australian Football League.

Debuting in 1992 after being recruited around 1990, Smith has long been one of the Bulldogs' favourite sons, with his reputation rising during the mid-1990s when he became one of the best half-backs in the league. In 1997 he cemented this reputation by earning an All-Australian selection.

Smith is currently serving as the backline coach of the Western Bulldogs and enjoys his time with his family.

== Early life ==
Smith attended St. Paul's College in Altona North, Victoria.

== 1997 ==
The 1997 season was the most eventful for Smith and his team, which made a preliminary final. Despite a four-point lead in the last quarter, the Bulldogs had victory stolen from them by Adelaide. The battling club, which was the subject of the Year of the Dogs documentary in 1996, drastically improved in 1997 with the club being renamed from Footscray to the Western Bulldogs and seemingly a new dawn arising with a Grand Final berth likely. He also had a little girl named Keely Shea Smith and in 1999 had a son named Jacob Harrington Smith.

With the Bulldogs' surrender of a big lead, Smith is best remembered for encapsulating the feelings of the team after the loss, on his knees in the middle of the Melbourne Cricket Ground, punching the turf.

== Later career ==
Smith again won All-Australian selection in 2003 and in recent seasons had been noted for his longevity in the game, at 33 years of age still being a valuable member of a young Bulldogs side. However, he had noticeably lost some of his pace during the 2006 season. He announced his retirement before the start of the finals series in 2006. There was talk of him continuing a further year if he was stuck on 299 games, but he insisted that he would retire at the end of the season, regardless of his games tally. The Bulldogs won their first final, against Collingwood, to set up a 300th game for Smith which he would share with Scott West, another long serving veteran and one of Smith's best friends at the club. Smith and West are, to date, the only team mates in AFL history to share their 300th game in the same match. The pair had previously shared their 150th and 200th matches together, with the Bulldogs winning on both occasions.

That game would be his last, with the Bulldogs going down to eventual premiers West Coast by 74 points. An emotional Smith was chaired off Subiaco Oval where he received a standing ovation, a testament to his illustrious career.

Smith now resides in Williamstown with his wife Alison and his two children.

Following his retirement, Smith became a commentator for Fox Sports, since 2012 Smith has been an assistant coach at his former club in the Western Bulldogs.

== Statistics ==
Legend
G	Goals	K	Kicks	D	Disposals	T	Tackles
B	Behinds	H	Handballs	M	Marks

Season	Team	No.	Games	Totals							Averages (per game)							Votes
Season	Team	No.	Games	G	B	K	H	D	M	T	G	B	K	H	D	M	T	Votes
1992	Footscray	31	14	10	9	95	46	141	24	19	0.7	0.6	6.8	3.3	10.1	1.7	1.4	0
1993	Footscray	5	6	7	6	54	18	72	23	5	1.2	1.0	9.0	3.0	12.0	3.8	0.8	0
1994	Footscray	5	11	2	1	63	43	106	22	16	0.2	0.1	5.7	3.9	9.6	2.0	1.5	0
1995	Footscray	5	22	6	9	277	135	412	86	28	0.3	0.4	12.6	6.1	18.7	3.9	1.3	12
1996	Footscray	5	22	15	9	280	105	385	89	29	0.7	0.4	12.7	4.8	17.5	4.0	1.3	4
1997	Western Bulldogs	5	24	26	13	318	145	463	95	32	1.1	0.5	13.3	6.0	19.3	4.0	1.3	3
1998	Western Bulldogs	5	24	29	26	245	121	366	101	23	1.2	1.1	10.2	5.0	15.3	4.2	1.0	6
1999	Western Bulldogs	5	24	31	22	284	114	398	122	17	1.3	0.9	11.8	4.8	16.6	5.1	0.7	6
2000	Western Bulldogs	5	23	42	20	271	108	379	125	15	1.8	0.9	11.8	4.7	16.5	5.4	0.6	0
2001	Western Bulldogs	5	21	18	21	258	102	360	96	17	0.9	1.0	12.3	4.9	17.1	4.6	0.8	3
2002	Western Bulldogs	5	22	18	11	293	130	423	111	31	0.8	0.5	13.3	5.9	19.2	5.0	1.4	3
2003	Western Bulldogs	5	22	6	7	353	144	497	95	30	0.3	0.3	16.0	6.5	22.6	4.3	1.4	4
2004	Western Bulldogs	5	21	7	13	304	88	392	97	29	0.3	0.6	14.5	4.2	18.7	4.6	1.4	4
2005	Western Bulldogs	5	20	16	17	243	135	378	121	26	0.8	0.9	12.2	6.8	18.9	6.1	1.3	0
2006	Western Bulldogs	5	24	21	10	241	132	373	137	45	0.9	0.4	10.0	5.5	15.5	5.7	1.9	0
Career			300	254	194	3579	1566	5145	1344	362	0.8	0.6	11.9	5.2	17.2	4.5	1.2	45
