= Sam Mitchell (footballer) =

Australian rules footballer (born 1982)

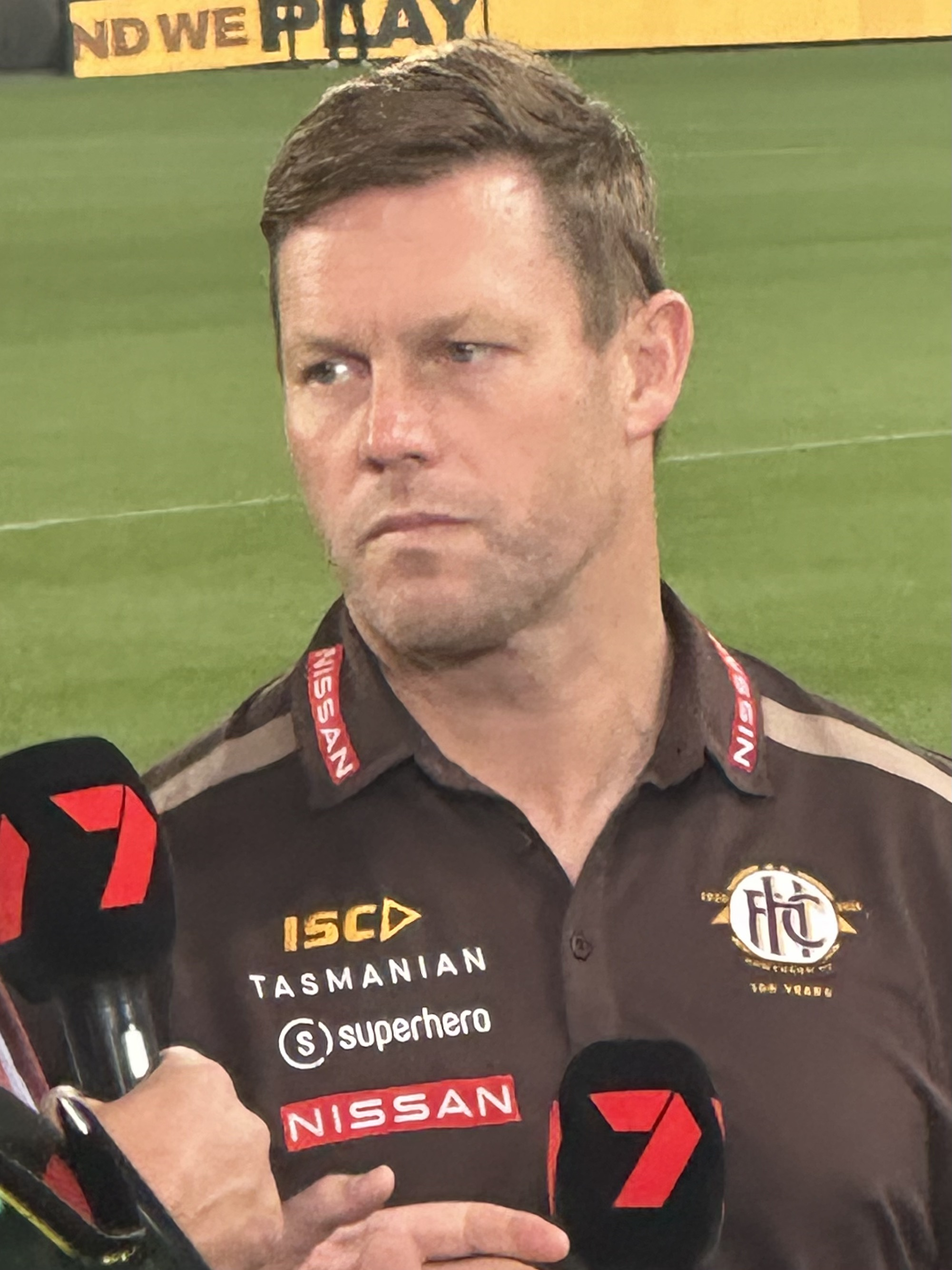
- Mitchell with Hawthorn in 2025

Personal information
- Full name: Samuel Mitchell
- Born: 12 October 1982 (age 44); Box Hill, Victoria
- Original team: Eastern Ranges (TAC Cup)/Box Hill Hawks
- Draft: No. 36, 2001 national draft
- Debut: Round 5, 2002, Hawthorn vs. Richmond, at Melbourne Cricket Ground
- Height: 180 cm (5 ft 11 in)
- Weight: 84 kg (185 lb)
- Position: Midfielder / defender

Playing career^{1}
Years	Club	Games (Goals)
2002–2016	Hawthorn	307 (67)
2017	West Coast	22 (4)
Total		329 (71)

Representative team honours
Years	Team	Games (Goals)
2008	Victoria	1 (0)

International team honours
2014–2015	Australia	2 (0)

Coaching career^{3}
Years	Club	Games (W–L–D)
2021	Box Hill (VFL)	10 (8–2–0)
2022–	Hawthorn	121 (63–56–2)
- ^{1} Playing statistics correct to the end of 2017.^{3} Coaching statistics correct as of 2026.

Career highlights
- 4× AFL premiership player: 2008 (c), 2013, 2014, 2015; Brownlow Medal: 2012; 3× All-Australian team: 2011, 2013, 2015; Hawthorn captain: 2008–2010; 5× Peter Crimmins Medal: 2006, 2009, 2011, 2012, 2016; AFL Rising Star: 2003; VFL premiership player: 2001; J.J. Liston Trophy: 2002; Col Austen Trophy: 2002; Australian Football Hall of Fame inductee: 2023; Hawthorn Football Club Hall of Fame inductee: 2024

Samuel Mitchell (born 12 October 1982) is an Australian rules football coach and former player who is the current coach of the Hawthorn Football Club in the Australian Football League (AFL).

As a player, he played with Hawthorn Football Club and the West Coast Eagles in the AFL. Following his retirement in 2017, Mitchell remained with West Coast as an assistant coach in 2018. In 2019, Mitchell returned to Hawthorn as the midfield coach before becoming head of development and senior coach of Hawthorn's VFL reserves affiliate team, the Box Hill Hawks, in 2021. In July 2021, Hawthorn appointed Mitchell as the next senior coach, taking over from Alastair Clarkson at the end of the 2021 season.

== Early life ==
Born in Mooroolbark, in Melbourne's outer eastern suburbs, Mitchell played in the under 18 TAC Cup competition with the Eastern Ranges. He was the club's best and fairest player in 1999 and 2000. Disappointed at being overlooked in the 2000 draft, Mitchell joined the Box Hill Hawks. After time in the reserves, he was promoted to the seniors, and completed the season as the team's number one rover. He was a member of Box Hill's premiership side in 2001.

== Playing career ==
=== Hawthorn ===
Mitchell was recruited to the Hawthorn Football Club in the AFL in the 2001 AFL draft with selection number 36. This selection was received by Hawthorn in the deal which saw Trent Croad and Luke McPharlin traded to Fremantle, while Hawthorn gained selections one (Luke Hodge), 20 (Daniel Elstone) and number 36 (Mitchell).

The first half of his debut season in 2002 saw him playing with the Box Hill Hawks, until he broke into the Hawthorn side midway through the season. Following some unimpressive performances where he never managed more than 14 disposals, he was dropped for round 15 but was recalled after more eye-catching performances in round 19. He polled 31 votes in just 11 games to win the VFL's best and fairest award, the J. J. Liston Trophy.

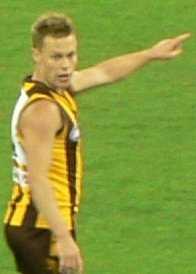
Mitchell in September 2007

In 2003 Mitchell continued to improve, winning the 2003 AFL Rising Star award and becoming known as "the Extractor" (particularly by commentator Brian Taylor) for his high amount of clearances and ability to win the ball out of middle of the ground.

A solid season followed in 2004, and in 2005 he played a "super" season until a foot injury sidelined him in round 15. For the 2006 season, Mitchell was named vice-captain of Hawthorn and displayed stellar form throughout the season culminating in winning the Peter Crimmins Medal for Hawthorn's best and fairest.

In 2007, Mitchell finished third in the Brownlow Medal count with 21 votes, one vote short of joint runners-up North Melbourne's Brent Harvey and Brisbane's Simon Black, who each polled 22 votes, and eight votes behind the winner, Geelong's Jimmy Bartel.

On 6 October 2007, during the Peter Crimmins Medal Event, he was announced as Hawthorn's next captain, taking over the reins from retiring captain Richie Vandenberg.

Mitchell was ineligible for 2008's Brownlow Medal following a tripping charge in the match against Melbourne in round nine.

On Saturday, 27 September, Mitchell captained the Hawks to the 2008 premiership, the first in 17 years and the club's 10th, beating the reigning premiers, Geelong, by 26 points. Mitchell was reported for rough conduct against Geelong's Gary Ablett, Jr. in the second quarter, however the report was dismissed at the conclusion of the weekend.

At the end of the 2010 season he handed the captaincy over to Luke Hodge, who was made captain of the 2010 All-Australian team.

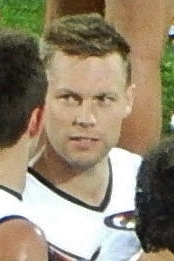
Mitchell with Hawthorn in 2014

Mitchell polled 30 votes in the 2011 Brownlow Medal, but was ineligible to win after an incident in round 5 of the season; he had the second-most votes, behind Collingwood's Dane Swan. In 2012, Mitchell, along with Richmond's Trent Cotchin, both finished tied for second place in the Brownlow to Jobe Watson. On 12 January 2016 the World Anti-Doping Agency found Watson and another 33 Essendon players guilty of taking a prohibited substance during the 2012 AFL season, an AFL commission meeting in November 2016 determined the implications for the 2012 Brownlow Medal. On 15 November 2016, Mitchell and Cotchin were both retrospectively awarded the medal, and, on 13 December 2016, both were formally presented with the Medals in a private ceremony in Melbourne.

Mitchell was rewarded with the Peter Crimmins Medal in 2011, 2012 and 2016, and became a five-time best and fairest winner at Hawthorn, behind only Leigh Matthews, who won eight during his career.

Mitchell became a triple premiership player with the Hawks in season 2014, and like a swathe of his teammates his year was interrupted by a serious injury. After overcoming a serious hamstring injury that saw him miss nine weeks, it meant that Mitchell played only 16 of a possible 25 games for the Hawks, his lowest tally since 2005 when he played 14 games. Still averaging over 28 disposals per game for the season mixing between midfield and half-back, Mitchell played a critical role in Hawthorn’s back-to-back premierships and was recognised as such by being named the side’s best player in the finals series by his coaches. Averaging 31.6 disposals, 9.0 marks, 6.3 tackles and 5.6 clearances across the three games, and was unlucky not to win the Norm Smith Medal in the Grand Final after 33 disposals, nine tackles, seven clearances and a goal assist.

Mitchell became a four-time premiership player with the Hawks in season 2015, with some considering it to be Sam Mitchell’s best AFL season to date, in which he earned his third All-Australian selection, but finished just behind Josh Gibson and Cyril Rioli in the Peter Crimmins Medal count. His disposal tally of 748 and average of 31.2 topped the AFL and represents his own peak. On 16 occasions, Mitchell tallied 30 or more disposals, and collected a record-breaking 137 disposals across four matches during the finals. Mitchell was again named the club’s Best Player in Finals. Polling 26 votes in the 2015 Brownlow Medal, Mitchell finished in the top three vote-getters for the third time in his career.

Mitchell played a total of 307 games and kicked a total of 67 goals for Hawthorn from 2002 until 2016 and was a member of Hawthorn's 2008, 2013, 2014 and 2015 premiership teams.

==== League award ====
The Fothergill–Round–Mitchell Medal is a Victorian Football League (VFL) award that is presented to the most promising young talent in the VFL competition. It was originally named the Fothergill–Round Medal after Des Fothergill and Barry Round, who at the time were the only two players to have won both the J. J. Liston Trophy (or one of its predecessors) and the Brownlow Medal; it was renamed the Fothergill–Round–Mitchell Medal in 2018 to also recognise Sam Mitchell, the third player to achieve the feat.

=== West Coast Eagles ===
On 12 October 2016, news broke that Mitchell, at Hawthorn's request, was considering a move to West Coast and he was officially traded to West Coast two days later. In August 2017, he announced he would retire from the AFL at the end of the 2017 season. Sam Mitchell played the final game of his career in the semi-final, where he recorded two goals and twenty-eight disposals in a 67-point loss to Greater Western Sydney. Mitchell played a total of 22 games and kicked a total of 4 goals for West Coast Eagles in 2017, in his only one season at the club.

== Coaching career ==
=== West Coast Eagles ===
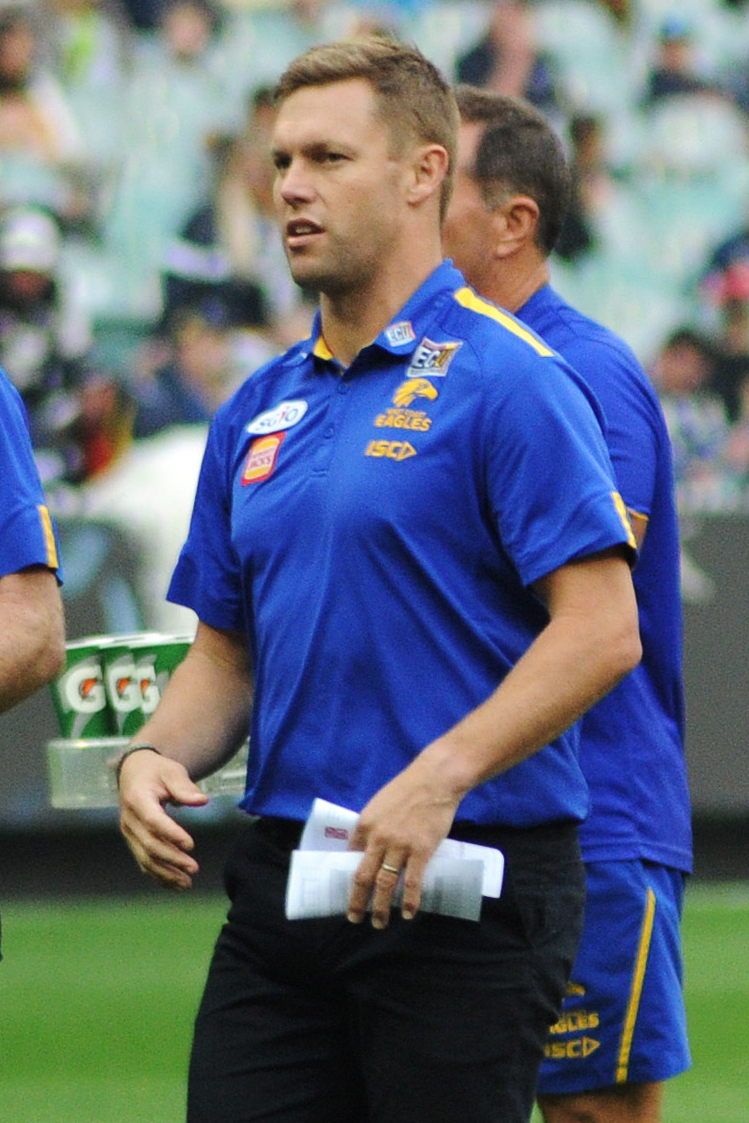
Mitchell with West Coast in 2018

Shortly after his retirement from playing, Mitchell served as an assistant coach with the West Coast Eagles in 2018 under senior coach Adam Simpson. At the conclusion of the 2018 AFL season, which saw West Coast win the AFL premiership in the 2018 AFL Grand Final, Mitchell departed the West Coast Eagles.

=== Hawthorn ===
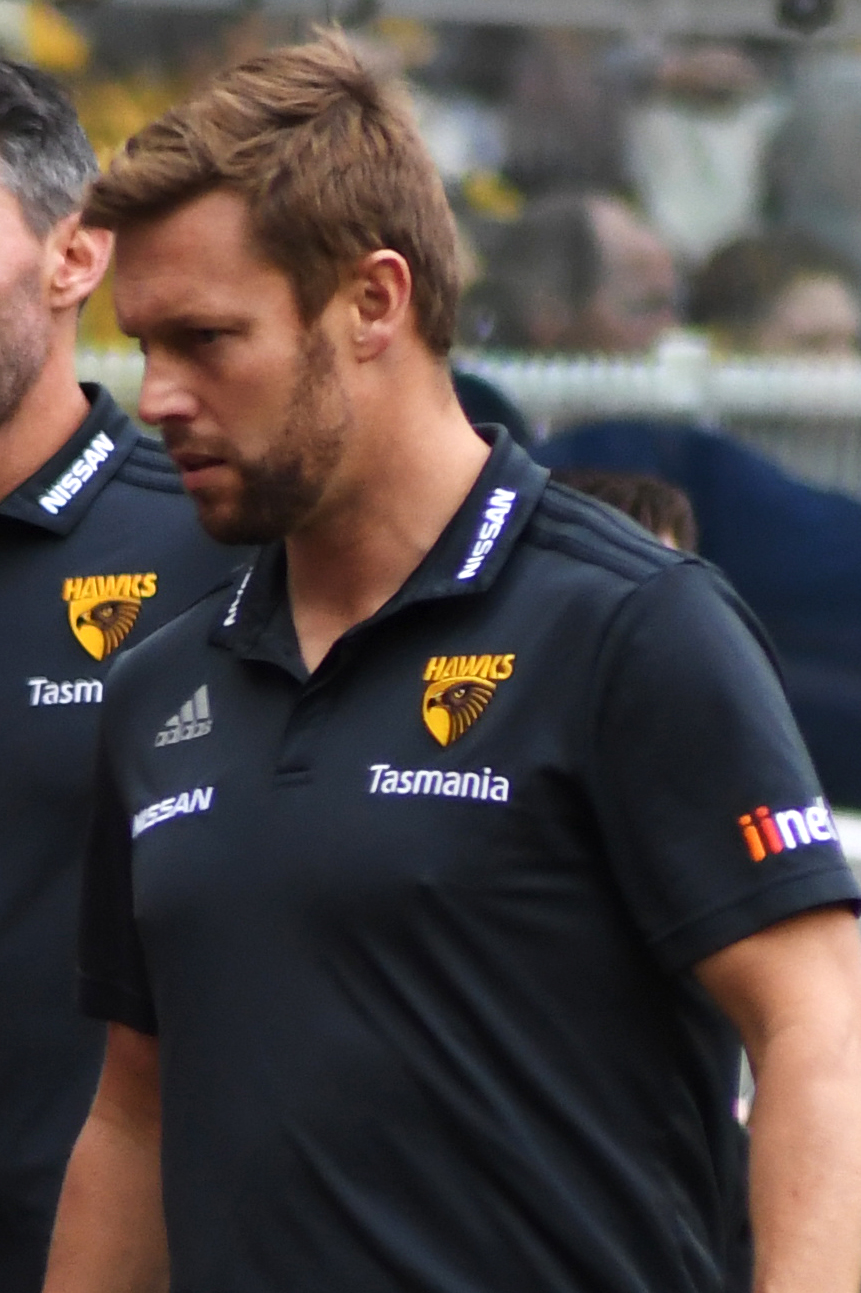
Mitchell as an assistant coach with Hawthorn in 2019

At the conclusion of the 2018 AFL season, Mitchell returned to Hawthorn to serve as an assistant coach in the position of midfield coach under senior coach Alastair Clarkson before becoming head of development and senior coach of Hawthorn's VFL affiliate team, the Box Hill Hawks in 2021.

On 6 July 2021, the Hawthorn Football Club announced that as part of a succession plan, Mitchell would succeed Alastair Clarkson as the senior coach of Hawthorn from 2023; until then, Mitchell will continue as Head of Development and as Box Hill Hawks senior coach. However, on 30 July 2021, it was announced that Clarkson would leave Hawthorn at the conclusion of the 2021 AFL season, with Mitchell immediately succeeding him.

In Mitchell's first season as senior coach of Hawthorn in the 2022 season, The Hawks under Mitchell finished in thirteenth place (fifth-last) position on the ladder with eight wins and fourteen losses, therefore not making finals. In the 2023 season, the Hawks under Mitchell finished sixteenth (third-last) position on the ladder with seven wins and sixteen losses and therefore not making finals.

In the 2024 AFL season, the Hawks finished in 7th on the ladder, playing finals for the first time under Mitchell.

== Kneeing controversy ==
On 13 July 2015, Mitchell was found guilty by the AFL's match review panel of having kneed the right thigh of Fremantle Dockers player Nathan Fyfe during the second quarter of the previous day's game and was fined $1000 for the offence. The media then brought to light other kneeing incidents involving Mitchell, those being the kneeing of Adelaide Crows captain Taylor Walker in the Round 12 game and the kneeing of Greater Western Sydney's Ryan Griffen in Round 6 of the 2015 season. Another kneeing video incident surfaced of Mitchell kneeing North Melbourne defender Scott Thompson. The video shows Mitchell walking up to an unsuspecting Thompson and kneeing him in the left thigh. Media reports from 2008 show that an opposition club, Brisbane, expressed concerns to the AFL about Sam Mitchell's kneeing of opponents.

== Playing style ==
Mitchell is often cited as one of the most ambidextrous players in the AFL and much opinion is made about which is his preferred foot. Although some have claimed that he was originally a left-footer who switched to his right foot later in his junior career, Mitchell has stated that he has just always tried to use the appropriate foot for the situation. He did, however, switch to his left foot when he wanted to kick longer. Similarly, his handpassing is equally good with either hand.

== Statistics ==
=== Playing statistics ===
Legend
G	Goals	K	Kicks	D	Disposals	T	Tackles
B	Behinds	H	Handballs	M	Marks
#	Played in that season's premiership team	†	Led the league for the season	±	Won that season's Brownlow Medal

Season	Team	No.	Games	Totals							Averages (per game)							Votes
Season	Team	No.	Games	G	B	K	H	D	M	T	G	B	K	H	D	M	T	Votes
2002	Hawthorn	28	9	1	1	53	48	101	19	29	0.1	0.1	5.9	5.3	11.2	2.1	3.2	1
2003	Hawthorn	28	21	5	2	199	174	373	54	89	0.2	0.1	9.5	8.3	17.8	2.6	4.2	9
2004	Hawthorn	5	20	5	5	210	162	372	47	60	0.3	0.3	10.5	8.1	18.6	2.4	3.0	2
2005	Hawthorn	5	14	2	4	186	157	343	62	49	0.1	0.3	13.3	11.2	24.5	4.4	3.5	9
2006	Hawthorn	5	22	3	6	327	265	592	119	71	0.1	0.3	14.9	12.0	26.9	5.4	3.2	13
2007	Hawthorn	5	23	2	3	262	331	593	120	96	0.1	0.1	11.4	14.4	25.8	5.2	4.2	21
2008^{#}	Hawthorn	5	24	4	2	313	354	667	90	88	0.2	0.1	13.0	14.8	27.8	3.8	3.7	15
2009	Hawthorn	5	22	7	3	346	308	654	111	66	0.3	0.1	15.7	14.0	29.7	5.0	3.0	13
2010	Hawthorn	5	19	5	4	282	242	524	76	90	0.3	0.2	14.8	12.7	27.6	4.0	4.7	15
2011	Hawthorn	5	23	12	8	404	297	701	94	99	0.5	0.3	17.6	12.9	30.5	4.1	4.3	30
2012	Hawthorn	5	24	7	7	345	308	653	84	133	0.3	0.3	14.4	12.8	27.2	3.5	5.5	26^{±}
2013^{#}	Hawthorn	5	24	5	5	371	302	673	83	78	0.2	0.2	15.5	12.6	28.0	3.5	3.3	16
2014^{#}	Hawthorn	5	16	3	3	228	221	449	78	55	0.2	0.2	14.3	13.8	28.1	4.9	3.4	8
2015^{#}	Hawthorn	5	24	6	3	374	374	748^{†}	98	92	0.3	0.1	15.6	15.6	31.2^{†}	4.1	3.8	26
2016	Hawthorn	5	22	0	3	343	309	652	80	79	0.0	0.1	15.6	14.0	29.6	3.6	3.6	16
2017	West Coast	1	22	4	4	260	278	538	71	64	0.1	0.2	13.0	13.9	26.9	3.6	3.2	7
Career			329	71	63	4503	4130	8633	1286	1238	0.2	0.2	13.8	12.6	26.4	3.9	3.8	227

== Head coaching record ==
Team	Year	Home and Away Season					Finals			
Team	Year	Won	Lost	Drew	%	Position	Won	Lost	Win %	Result
HAW	2022	8	14	0	.364	13th out of 18	—	—	—	—
HAW	2023	7	16	0	.304	16th out of 18	—	—	—	—
HAW	2024	14	9	0	.609	7th out of 18	1	1	.500	Lost to Port Adelaide in Semi Final
HAW	2025	15	8	0	.652	8th out of 18	2	1	.667	Lost to Geelong in Preliminary Final
HAW	2026	15	6	2	.652	4th out of 18	1	1	.500	Lost to Brisbane Lions in Preliminary Final
Total		59	53	2	.526		4	3	.571	

== Honours and achievements ==
=== Playing ===
Team

- 4× AFL premiership player (Hawthorn): 2008, 2013, 2014, 2015
- 2× McClelland Trophy/Minor premiership (Hawthorn): 2012, 2013
- VFL premiership player (Box Hill): 2001

Individual

- AFL premiership captain: 2008
- Brownlow Medal: 2012
- 3× All-Australian team: 2011, 2013, 2015
- Hawthorn Captain: 2008–2010
- 5× Peter Crimmins Medal: 2006, 2009, 2011, 2012, 2016
- Norwich Rising Star Award: 2003
- J. J. Liston Trophy: 2002
- Col Austen Trophy: 2002
- Herald Sun Player of the Year Award: 2011
- 2× Lou Richards Medal: 2011, 2015
- 2× Australian international rules football team: 2014, 2015
- Victoria Australian rules football team: 2008
- AFL Rising Star nominee: 2003
- Australian Football Hall of Fame inductee: 2023
- Hawthorn Football Club Hall of Fame inductee: 2024

=== Coaching ===
Team

- McClelland Trophy (Hawthorn): 2024

=== League ===
Fothergill–Round–Mitchell Medal

== Personal life ==
Mitchell married Lyndall Degenhardt in early November 2009. They have a son and twin daughters.
