= 2017 International Rules Series =

- Event: International Rules Series
Australia	Ireland
116	103
- Australia won the series (2–0)

First test
Australia	Ireland
2.13.12 (63)	1.13.8 (53)
- Date: 12 November 2017
- Venue: Adelaide Oval, Adelaide

Second test
Ireland	Australia
2.10.8 (50)	0.15.8 (53)
- Date: 18 November 2017
- Venue: Domain Stadium, Perth

The 2017 International Rules Series (officially the 2017 Virgin Australia International Rules Series) was the 20th and currently final International Rules Series contested by Gaelic footballers from Ireland and Australian footballers from Australia. The series was hosted by Australia and was the first in four years to revert to an aggregate points format. The two test matches were played on 12 and 18 November 2017 at the Adelaide Oval and Domain Stadium.

== Fixtures ==
- First test match: Australia v. Ireland, 12 November 2017
- Second test match: Australia v. Ireland, 18 November 2017

Finals
Australia	63	53	116
(Republic of Ireland) Ireland	53	50	103

== Background ==
The series reverted to the traditional two-match format, with the team scoring the highest amount over the two test matches being the winner. The AFL and GAA announced the dates of the two matches in November 2016. In March 2017 West Australian Football Commission (WAFC) chief executive Gavin Taylor revealed that the WAFC would bid for the right to host one of the test matches at Domain Stadium (which is the headquarters of the WAFC), in what would likely be the venue's final elite-level football match considering the AFL's move to the new Perth Stadium by the start of the 2018 season. On 8 August 2017, the AFL announced that the Adelaide Oval in Adelaide, South Australia would host the first test and Domain Stadium in Perth, Western Australia would host the second test. The series was broadcast live on the Seven Network in Australia and on RTÉ Television in Ireland.

=== Australian team ===
The AFL considered a number of prospective coaches to manage the Australian team. Among the favourites for the role included 2016 premiership coach Luke Beveridge, previous Australian coach Alastair Clarkson, as well as former assistant coaches of the Australian team Chris Scott (eventual appointee) and Ross Lyon. On 17 July, the AFL announced that Scott had been selected for the coaching position, who said the appointment was "a tremendous honour". Scott was joined by Lyon and brother Brad as assistant coaches.

The initial Australian squad was announced on 12 October 2017. Among the squad were multiple All-Australians Gary Ablett Jr., Patrick Dangerfield, Scott Pendlebury and Joel Selwood, and five players – Michael Hibberd, Rory Laird, Zach Merrett, Paddy Ryder and Dayne Zorko – who had made the All-Australian team for the first time in their careers in 2017. Of the 17-man squad, nine players – Ablett, Nat Fyfe, Toby Greene, Hibberd, Laird, Merrett, Ryder, Rory Sloane and Zorko – have not represented Australia in International rules football before. Only three players – Eddie Betts, Dangerfield and Brendon Goddard – represented Australia in the 2015 series. The selectors had the capacity to add further selections closer to the matches, after assessing other players' availability from their leave periods. Goddard was chosen to fill the goalkeeper position for the Australian team, while Greene was ruled out with a broken toe. An additional six players were selected to fill the squad on 2 November 2017. Only five days prior to the first test, Ablett pulled out of the Australian team, citing personal reasons. On 10 November, three-time Hawthorn premiership player Shaun Burgoyne was appointed captain of the Australian team. Ahead of the second test match, North Melbourne midfielder Shaun Higgins was brought into the Australian squad, replacing the injured Scott Pendlebury and Paddy Ryder.

=== Irish team ===
Joe Kernan, Ireland's manager for the 2015 series, returned to coach the Irish team for a second time, joined by Pádraic Joyce, Darragh Ó Sé and Dermot Earley Jnr on the coaching and selection panel. Kernan revealed his coaching panel would consider fitness as well as catching and kicking skills when it came to selecting the squad, and praised the series organisers for returning the concept to a two-match series. In late September, Kernan stated that the final squad of 23 players would include three Irish AFL players, Zach Tuohy of Geelong, Pearce Hanley of Gold Coast and Conor McKenna of Essendon; however McKenna sustained an injury in training and was ruled out of selection. On 25 October, Kernan and the Irish management team announced a 21-man touring squad for the series. Mayo's Aidan O'Shea, who represented Ireland in the 2013, 2014 and 2015 series, was announced as captain of the team whilst Conor McManus of Monaghan was appointed vice-captain. In total 14 counties were represented on the panel, including four from Mayo and three from Kerry; however no players from 2017 All-Ireland SFC winners Dublin were selected. Seán Powter of Cork and Niall Grimley of Armagh were later added to the team, completing the final 23-man squad. After Pearce Hanley broke his hand in the first test match, Monaghan player Darren Hughes flew out to Australia for the second test match, replacing Hanley's position in the squad. Additionally, former Carlton AFL defender Ciarán Sheehan was drafted into the Irish squad prior to the second test match.

== Squads ==
- Coach: Chris Scott (Geelong)

Australia
Name	Club
Shaun Burgoyne (c)	Hawthorn
Brendon Goddard (gk)	Essendon
Eddie Betts	Adelaide
Travis Boak	Port Adelaide
Ben Brown	North Melbourne
Patrick Dangerfield	Geelong
Nat Fyfe	Fremantle
Jack Gunston	Hawthorn
Michael Hibberd	Melbourne
Shaun Higgins (Note: Scott Pendlebury was injured in the first test and his place in the squad for the second test was taken by Shaun Higgins.)	North Melbourne
Neville Jetta	Melbourne
Rory Laird	Adelaide
Zach Merrett	Essendon
Scott Pendlebury	Collingwood
Paddy Ryder	Port Adelaide
Joel Selwood	Geelong
Luke Shuey	West Coast
Kade Simpson	Carlton
Rory Sloane	Adelaide
Robbie Tarrant	North Melbourne
Chad Wingard	Port Adelaide
Dayne Zorko	Brisbane Lions

- Coach: Joe Kernan (Armagh)

Ireland
Name	Team	Club
Aidan O'Shea (c)	Mayo	Breaffy
Conor McManus (vc)	Monaghan	Clontibret
Niall Morgan (gk)	Tyrone	Edendork
Chris Barrett	Mayo	Belmullet
Gary Brennan	Clare	Clondegad
Eoin Cadogan	Cork	Douglas
Killian Clarke	Cavan	Shercock
Peter Crowley	Kerry	Laune Rangers
Kevin Feely	Kildare	Athy
Paul Geaney	Kerry	Dingle
Niall Grimley	Armagh	Madden
Pearce Hanley (Note: Pearce Hanley was injured in the first test and his place in the squad for the second test was taken by Darren Hughes.)	Gold Coast & Mayo	Ballaghaderreen
Brendan Harrison	Mayo	Aghamore
Darren Hughes	Monaghan	Scotstown
Michael Murphy	Donegal	Glenswilly
Niall Murphy	Sligo	Coolera/Strandhill
Paul Murphy	Kerry	Rathmore
Karl O'Connell	Monaghan	Tyholland
Seán Powter	Cork	Douglas
Ciarán Sheehan	Cork	Éire Óg
Niall Sludden	Tyrone	Dromore
Enda Smith	Roscommon	Boyle
Conor Sweeney	Tipperary	Ballyporeen
Zach Tuohy	Geelong & Laois	Portlaoise
Shane Walsh	Galway	Kilkerrin-Clonberne

== Results ==
2017 International Rules Series – First Test
Sunday 12 November (3.40pm ACDT / 5.10am IST)	Australia	def.	Ireland	Adelaide Oval, Adelaide (Crowd: 25,502)
0.3.5 (14); 0.7.7 (28); 1.12.8 (50); 2.13.12 (63)	Q1; Q2; Q3; Final	0.4.3 (15); 1.6.3 (27); 1.8.5 (35); 1.13.8 (53)	Umpires: Matt Stevic (Australia), Maurice Deegan (Ireland); Television broadcast: Seven Network (Australia), RTÉ Television (Ireland)
Fyfe, Shuey	Goals	M. Murphy
Fyfe 3 Wingard, Brown, Zorko 2 Dangerfield, Simpson, Betts, Ryder 1	Overs	McManus 7 M. Murphy 4 Sweeney, Geaney 1
Fyfe, Goddard, Dangerfield, Wingard, Simpson	Best	McManus, M. Murphy, Tuohy, O'Shea
Pendlebury (finger)	Injuries	Hanley (hand)

2017 International Rules Series – Second Test
Saturday 18 November (4.45pm AWST / 8.45am IST)	Australia	def.	Ireland	Domain Stadium, Perth (Crowd: 30,116)
0.3.2 (11); 0.4.5 (17); 0.9.7 (35); 0.15.8 (53)	Q1; Q2; Q3; Final	2.1.2 (17); 2.5.3 (30); 2.8.5 (41); 2.10.8 (50)	Umpires: Matt Stevic (Australia), Maurice Deegan (Ireland); Television broadcast: Seven Network (Australia), RTÉ Television (Ireland)
Nil	Goals	Brennan, Barrett
Zorko 3 Wingard, Sloane, Betts 2 Merrett, Laird, Brown, Fyfe, Burgoyne, Shuey 1	Overs	McManus 5 M. Murphy 2 Walsh, Sheehan, Grimley 1
Simpson, Merrett, Fyfe, Zorko, Goddard	Best	C. McManus, M. Murphy, S. Walsh, O'Shea, Tuohy
Nil	Injuries	Nil
Jim Stynes Medal (Australia): Nat Fyfe; GAA Medal (Ireland): Conor McManus; Joel Selwood received a black card and was sent off shortly before half-time for a late and high bump on Chris Barrett.; This was the final sporting event to be held at Subiaco Oval before it was demolished.

== See also ==
- International rules football
- Gaelic football
- Australian rules football
- Relationship between Gaelic football and Australian rules football
