= 2014 International Rules Series =

- Event: International Rules Series
Australia	Ireland
56	46
- Australia won by 10 points
- Date: 22 November 2014
- Venue: Patersons Stadium, Perth, Western Australia
- Man of the Match: Luke Hodge (Australia)
- Man of the Match: Conor McManus (Ireland)
- Referee: Simon Meredith (Australia); Marty Duffy (Ireland)
- Attendance: 38,262 (Sell-out)

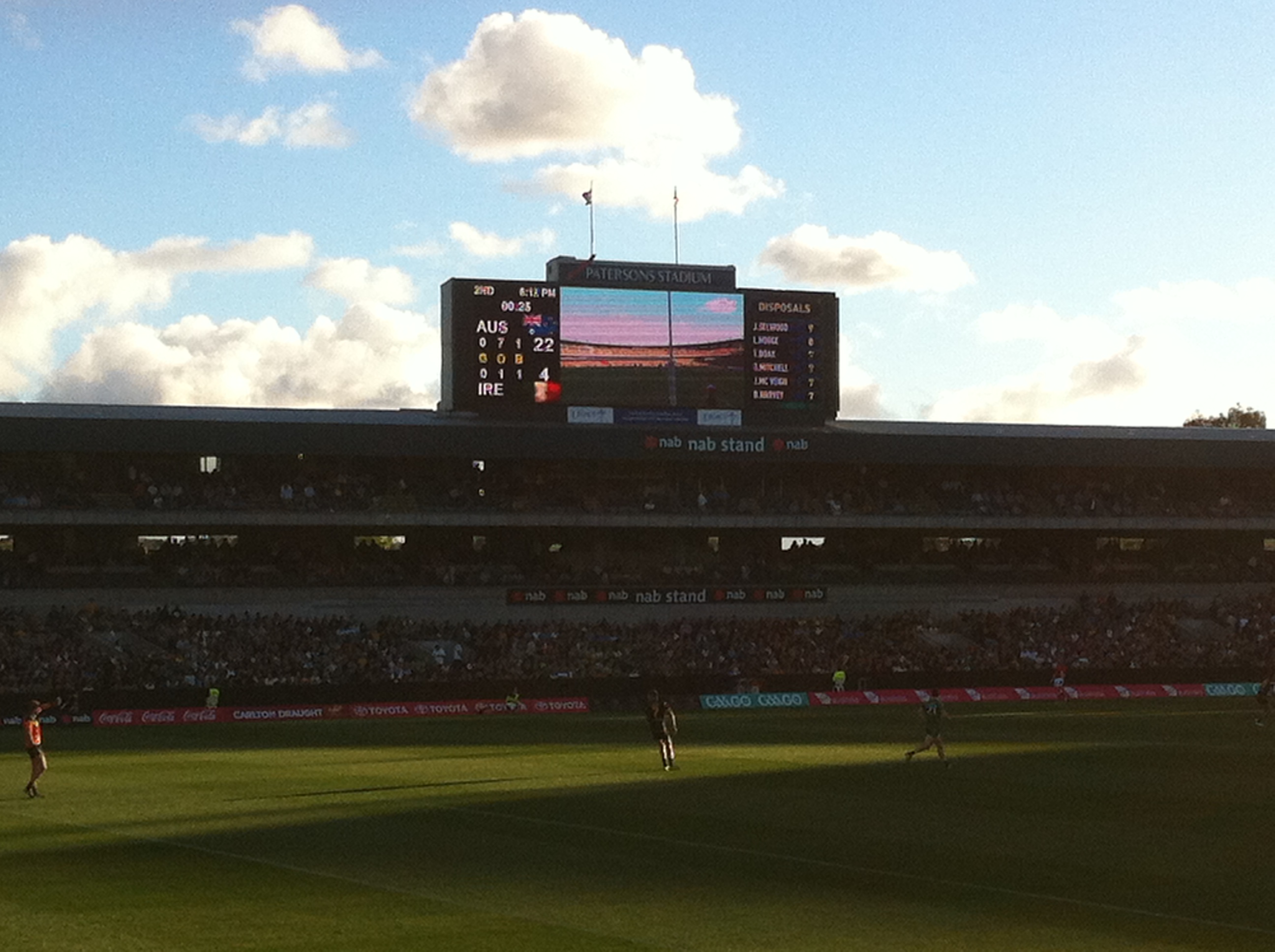
Scoreboard at Quarter time

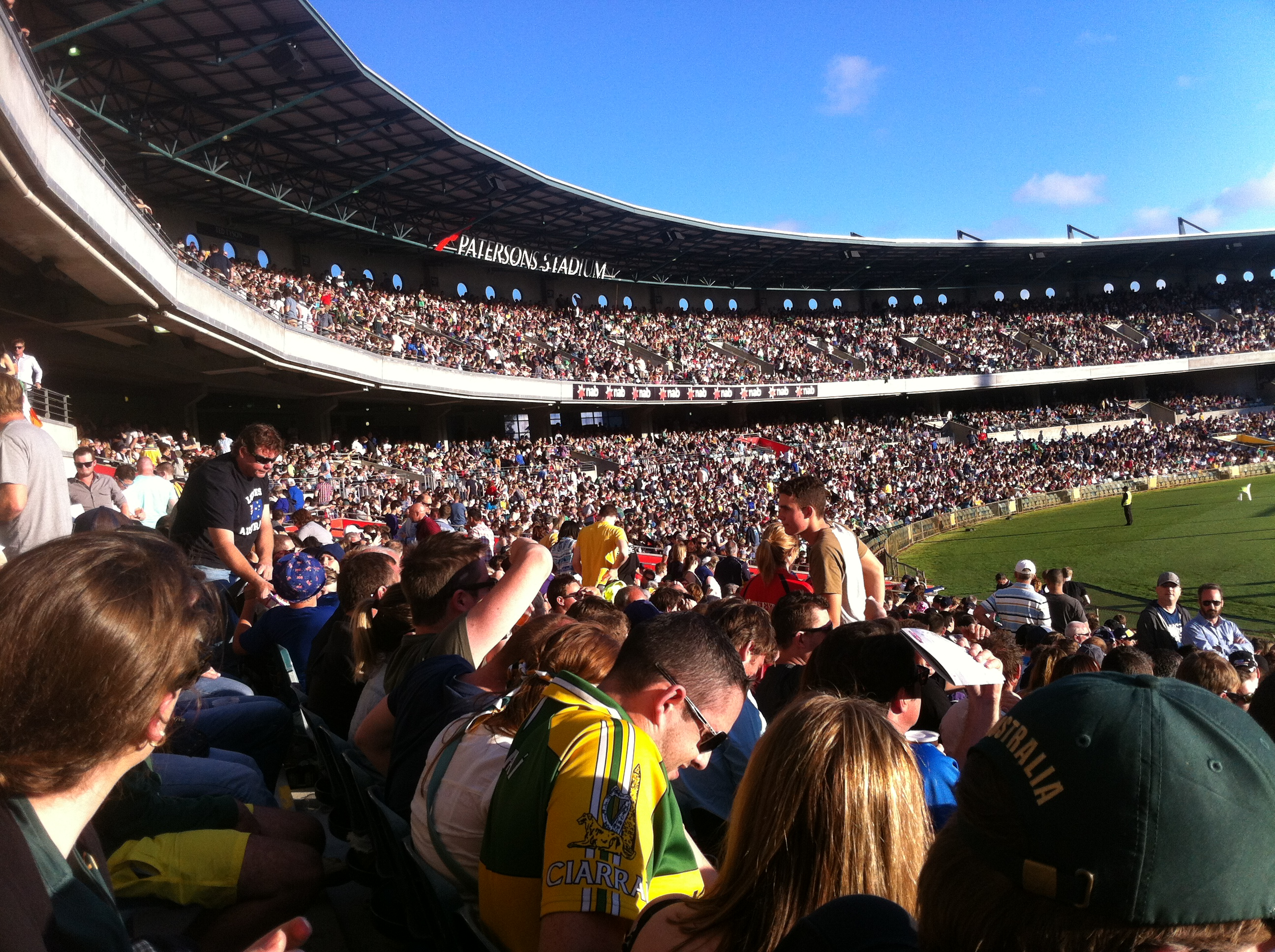
Crowd at City end of Stadium

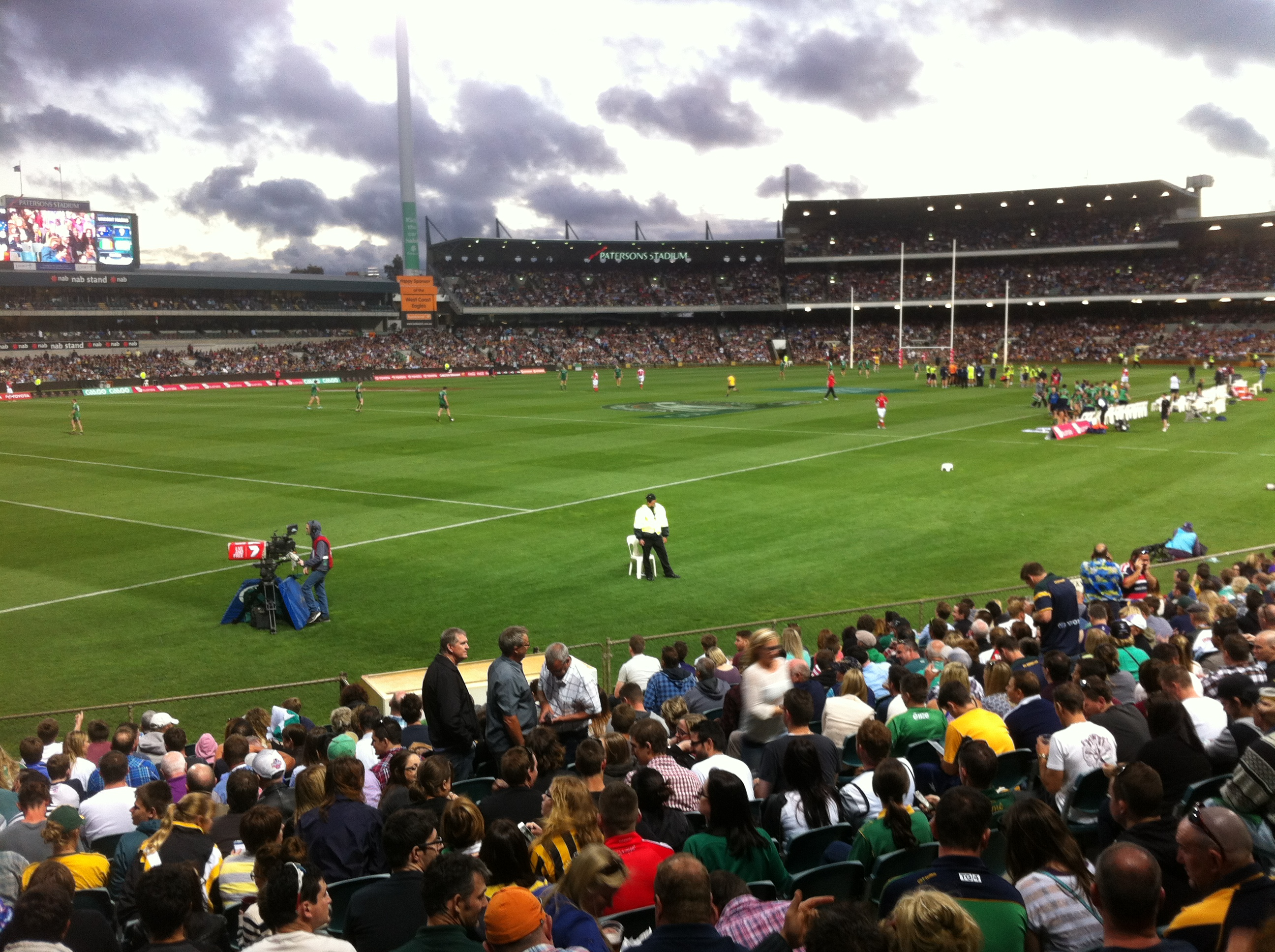
Restart of play after half time

Ireland kick first over in second half

Mexican Wave toward end of game

The 2014 International Rules Series (officially the 2014 Virgin Australia International Rules Test) was contested between Gaelic footballers from Ireland and Australian footballers from Australia. The 18th series of international rules football since the concept's inception in 1984, Ireland entered as defending champions, with Australia seeking their first series win since 2010. The match was played at Perth's Patersons Stadium on Saturday 22 November.

Unlike previous years, the series was reduced to a single one-off Test match, which Australia won 56–46 to record their first series win in four years and the Cormac McAnallen Cup. The win also levelled the overall series wins between the two sides at 9–9. Selection eligibility was again altered for the Australian team, with only players previously selected in an All-Australian team eligible to represent Australia.

== Fixtures ==
- Warm-up game: Ireland 9.11.13 (100) def. VFL 1.5.6 (27), 16 November 2014 at Trevor Barker Beach Oval, Melbourne
- Warm-up game: Australia 86 def. NSW GAA 7, 18 November 2014 at Tom Wills Oval, Sydney
- Test match: Australia 56 def. Ireland 46, 22 November 2014 at Patersons Stadium, Perth

== Background ==
=== Australian team ===
For the first time since 2004, only players selected for any All-Australian team were eligible for selection to represent Australia. The change was made so as to attempt to boost public interest in the series. In April 2014, the AFL announced that 2008 and 2013 Hawthorn premiership coach Alastair Clarkson would coach the Australian side and that Collingwood club president and public figure Eddie McGuire would take on the promotional role of Chef de Mission. McGuire stated of the series a need to recapture the prestige associated with playing for Australia; "putting the coat of arms over our hearts again to take on the Irish ... we'll turn this into something special. We will make sure only the very best players will be picked in the first place and that they will be desperate to play".

In July 2014, AFL executives announced that Fremantle 2013 Grand Final coach Ross Lyon would be Australia's assistant coach for the test match and that multiple All-Australian players Luke Hodge, Scott Pendlebury, Joel Selwood and Patrick Dangerfield had committed to representing Australia. The league subsequently announced that Geelong premiership coach Chris Scott would join the coaching panel as a second assistant coach. The Australian jersey for the test match was announced on 4 October, with the inclusion of the green and gold v-design a significant point of difference from previous designs. In November, three-time premiership player and Geelong captain Joel Selwood was selected as captain of the Australian team.

The squad was announced in October 2014. Due to the eligibility criteria of having been selected for an All-Australian team, Brownlow medalist Matt Priddis couldn't be selected. Star trio of Gary Ablett, Lance Franklin and Scott Pendlebury were notable absentees, being ruled out because of injuries. Fremantle best and fairest Nat Fyfe, originally selected for the test match, was ruled out of the match after sustaining a shoulder injury during Australia's warm up win over a New South Wales Gaelic football team. The Australian team and the series itself was sponsored chiefly by airline company Virgin Australia, with the company logo featuring prominently on the Australian team jersey. The Seven Network and its digital multichannel 7mate broadcast the match in Australia and Sommet Sports broadcast the match in New Zealand.

=== Irish team ===
Gaelic Athletic Association (GAA) president Liam O'Neill announced in April 2014 that former Roscommon footballer Paul Earley would once again serve as manager and coach of the Irish team, joined by a back room team identical to the 2013 series, including Tony Scullion (Derry), Séamus McCarthy (Tipperary), Jarlath Fallon (Galway) and Nicholas Walsh (Cavan/GWS Giants). The Irish team will be sponsored on the team jersey and sports kits by live stream service GAAGO. Irish language TV network TG4 will broadcast the test match live into Ireland.

Ireland plan without reigning Footballer of the Year Michael Darragh MacAuley (broken finger) and last year's Player of the Series Ciarán Sheehan, who is tied to AFL club Carlton. Last year's captain Michael Murphy and fellow 2014 All-Ireland finalists with Donegal, Patrick McBrearty and Neil McGee, all returned.

The Irish touring squad was announced on 28 October 2014. Donegal's All-Ireland winning captain Michael Murphy was again selected for the role of captain of the national team, while Cork's Aidan Walsh was selected as vice-captain. In total, 15 counties are included across the 25 man squad, Mayo leading the way with four Irish-based players and Brisbane Lions prolific back-man Pearce Hanley being the only AFL player selected in the side. All-Ireland champions Kerry featured only one member in the team.

== Rule changes ==
It was announced that several rule changes would be made for the 2014 test match so as to accommodate key position Australian players seeking opportunity to compete. In July 2014, the AFL and GAA introduced several rule changes:

- Number of consecutive hand-passes teams are allowed increased from four to six
- Interchange rotations increased from 10 to 15 a quarter (unlimited rotations allowed at quarter and half time breaks)
- A mark no longer paid for a backwards kick
- Goalkeepers required to kick the ball out beyond the 45m line after all wides, behinds and overs
- Failure of a goalkeeper to kick over the 45m line will result in a free kick to the opposition (from the 45m line)

== Squads ==
- Coach: Alastair Clarkson (Hawthorn)

Australia
Name	Team
Joel Selwood (c)	Geelong
Dustin Fletcher (gk)	Essendon
Grant Birchall	Hawthorn
Travis Boak	Port Adelaide
Luke Breust	Hawthorn
Patrick Dangerfield	Adelaide
Nat Fyfe†	Fremantle
Brendon Goddard	Essendon
Robbie Gray	Port Adelaide
Brent Harvey	North Melbourne
Luke Hodge	Hawthorn
Kieren Jack	Sydney
Steve Johnson	Geelong
Jarrad McVeigh	Sydney
Sam Mitchell	Hawthorn
Leigh Montagna	St Kilda
Nic Naitanui	West Coast
Nick Riewoldt	St Kilda
Tom Rockliff	Brisbane Lions
Brodie Smith	Adelaide
Nick Smith	Sydney
Harry Taylor	Geelong
Jobe Watson	Essendon
Chad Wingard	Port Adelaide

† Nat Fyfe was selected in the Australian team though did not participate in the test match after being injured in the warm-up match

- Coach: Paul Earley (Roscommon)

Ireland
Name	Team	Club
Michael Murphy (c)	Donegal	Glenswilly
Aidan Walsh (vc)	Cork	Kanturk
Paddy O'Rourke (gk)	Meath	Skryne
Colm Begley	Laois	Stradbally
Colm Boyle	Mayo	Davitts
Seán Cavanagh	Tyrone	Moy
Cathal Cregg	Roscommon	Western Gaels
Mattie Donnelly	Tyrone	Trillick
Finian Hanley	Galway	Salthill-Knocknacarra
Pearce Hanley	Brisbane Lions	Ballaghaderreen
Darren Hughes	Monaghan	Scotstown
Lee Keegan	Mayo	Westport
James McCarthy	Dublin	Ballymun Kickhams
Ciarán McDonald	Tipperary	Aherlow
Neil McGee	Donegal	Gaoth Dobhair
Chrissy McKaigue	Derry	Slaughtneil
Kevin McKernan	Down	Burren
Kevin McLoughlin	Mayo	Knockmore
Conor McManus	Monaghan	Clontibret O'Neills
David Moran	Kerry	Kerins O'Rahilly's
Niall Morgan†	Tyrone	Edendork
Ross Munnelly	Laois	Arles/Kilcruise
Colm O'Neill	Cork	Ballyclough
Padraig O'Neill†	Kildare	St Laurence's
Aidan O'Shea	Mayo	Breaffy

† Niall Morgan and Padraig O'Neill were selected in the Ireland squad, though did not participate in the test match after failing to make the final 23-man team

== Result ==
	2014 International Rules Test
Saturday 22 November (5.45pm AWT)	Australia	def.	Ireland	Patersons Stadium, Perth (Crowd: 38,262)	Report; Video
	0.7.1 (22); 0.11.2 (35); 0.14.4 (46); 0.17.5 (56)	Q1; Q2; Q3; Final	0.1.1 (4); 0.1.4 (7); 1.6.6 (30); 2.9.7 (46)	Umpires: Simon Meredith (Australia); Marty Duffy (Ireland); Television broadcast: Seven Network/7mate (Aus); TG4 (Ire); Sommet Sports (NZ)
Nil		Goals	Hughes, N. Smith (Australia - Own Goal)
Johnson 4, Riewoldt 3, Wingard 3, McVeigh 2, Harvey, Gray, Selwood, Jack, Breust		Overs	McManus 4, Begley 2, Donnelly, McKernan, Murphy
Hodge, Mitchell, Johnson, Riewoldt, Watson, Fletcher		Best	McManus, Begley, Moran, Murphy, Donnelly
Nil		Injuries	Nil
Nil		Reports	Nil
Jim Stynes Medal (Australia): Luke Hodge; GAA Medal (Ireland): Conor McManus; Seven Network Broadcast of the Test Match (YouTube)

== See also ==
- Australian rules football
- Gaelic football
- International rules football
- Relationship between Gaelic football and Australian rules football
