= 2010 International Rules Series =

- Event: International Rules Series
Ireland	Australia
92	102
- 92–102 on aggregate, Australia win series 2–0

First test
Ireland	Australia
40	47
- Date: 23 October 2010
- Venue: Gaelic Grounds, Limerick
- Referee: David Coldrick (Ireland); Brett Rosebury (Australia)
- Attendance: 30,117

Second test
Australia	Ireland
55	52
- Date: 30 October 2010
- Venue: Croke Park, Dublin
- Referee: David Coldrick (Ireland); Brett Roesbury (Australia)
- Attendance: 61,842

The 2010 International Rules Series (officially the 2010 Irish Daily Mail International Rules Series) was the 15th International Rules Series, contested between Gaelic football players from Ireland and Australian rules football players from Australia. The Series was won by Australia, winning the first test by seven points and the second test by three, thereby winning with an aggregate score of 102 to 92. This was the first time Australia have won the Cormac McAnallen Cup since 2006. Dane Swan was awarded the Jim Stynes Medal, for being Australia best player over the Series, while Colm Begley won the equivalent award for Ireland. The second test in Croke Park on 30 October marked the end of the broadcasting career of commentator Micheál Ó Muircheartaigh who commentated on his last live match on RTÉ Radio.

== Background ==
The 2010 International rules series dates were confirmed by the Australian Football League (AFL) and the Gaelic Athletic Association (GAA) on 19 February. Australian coach Mick Malthouse announced his 23-man squad on 8 October. Anthony Tohill was announced as coach of Ireland mid year, and he announced his squad on 14 October. The 2010 Series was the first series to be played since 2008, after global economic problems forced the AFL to pull out of the 2009 edition. It also marked the first series in Ireland since the ill-fated 2006 series. Irish Team Manager Anthony Tohill announced his final squad for the first test of the series on 19 October. Niall McNamee of Offaly is promoted from the standby list to the match day squad for the injured Benny Coulter, who is ruled out of the first test with a hamstring problem. Emmet Bolton of Kildare replaced Michael Shields who was unavailable for the first test as he was playing for St.Finbarr's in the 2010 Cork Senior Football Championship final against Nemo Rangers on 20 October.

Australia prepared for the opening test with a comfortable win in a practice match against a Cork underage representative side on 20 October. Australia won the match 105–12, in front of 2,867 fans at Páirc Uí Rinn in Cork on the Wednesday night, prior to the opening test in Limerick.

== Squads ==
(Republic of Ireland) Ireland			Australia		
Ireland			Australia		
Name	Team	Position	Name	Team	Position
Anthony Tohill	Derry	Coach	Mick Malthouse	Collingwood	Coach
15. Steven McDonnell	Armagh	Captain	Adam Goodes	Sydney	Captain
10. Finian Hanley	Galway	Vice Captain	Matthew Boyd	Western Bulldogs	Vice Captain
2. Colm Begley	Laois		Kade Simpson	Carlton	Vice Captain
3. Bernard Brogan	Dublin		Dane Swan	Collingwood	Vice Captain
4. Graham Canty	Cork		Patrick Dangerfield	Adelaide	
5. Sean Cavanagh	Tyrone		Dustin Fletcher	Essendon	Goalkeeper
6. Martin Clarke	Down		James Frawley	Melbourne	
1. Stephen Cluxton	Dublin	Goalkeeper	Bryce Gibbs	Carlton	
7. Brendan Donaghy	Armagh		Sam Gilbert	St Kilda	
8. Leighton Glynn	Wicklow		Tyson Goldsack	Collingwood	
9. Daniel Goulding	Cork		Todd Banfield	Brisbane	
11. James Kavanagh	Kildare		Brad Green	Melbourne	
12. Paddy Keenan	Louth		Garrick Ibbotson	Fremantle	
13. Tadhg Kennelly	Sydney		Kieren Jack	Sydney	
14. Sean McDermott	Roscommon		Jarrad McVeigh	Sydney	
16. Ciaran McKeever	Armagh		Leigh Montagna	St Kilda	
17. Kevin McKernan	Down		Jack Riewoldt	Richmond	
18. Brendan Murphy	Carlow		Eddie Betts	Carlton	
19. Michael Murphy	Donegal		Daniel Cross	Western Bulldogs	
20. Kevin Reilly	Meath		Travis Varcoe	Geelong	
21. Michael Shields	Cork		David Wojcinski	Geelong	
22. Tommy Walsh	Kerry		Paul Duffield	Fremantle	
23. Emmet Bolton*	Kildare		Liam Picken	Western Bulldogs	
24. Gary Brennan*	Clare				
25. Gary Connaughton*	Westmeath				
26. Benny Coulter*	Down				
27. Eamonn Fennell*	Dublin				
28. Johnny McCarthy*	Limerick				
29. Niall McNamee*	Offaly				

*Reserved on Standby

== Matches ==
2010 International Rules Series – Test 1
Saturday, 23 October 2010	Ireland	def. by	Australia	Gaelic Grounds, Limerick, County Limerick (Crowd: 30,117)
0.2.3 (9); 0.3.7 (16); 0.5.7 (22); 1.8.10 (40)	Q1; Q2; Q3; Final	0.4.0 (12); 0.7.0 (21); 0.10.2 (32); 0.14.5 (47)	Umpires: David Coldrick (Ireland) & Brett Rosebury (Australia); Television broadcast: TBA
Brogan	Goals	Nil
McDonnell 2, Brogan, Goulding, Cavanagh, Glynn, McKernan, Walsh	Overs	Goodes 4, Banfield 2, Betts 2, Montagna 2, Cross 2, Frawley, Dangerfield
Cavanagh, Begley, McDonnell, Kennelly, Brogan, Cluxton	Best	Boyd, Cross, Swan, Duffield, Banfield, Ibbotson, Picken, Goodes
Nil	Injuries	Nil

2010 International Rules Series – Test 2
Saturday, 30 October 2010	Ireland	def. by	Australia	Croke Park, Dublin, County Dublin (Crowd: 61,842)
0.2.3 (9); 0.4.5 (17); 1.8.8 (38); 1.11.13 (52)	Q1; Q2; Q3; Final	0.4.4 (16); 0.7.7 (28); 0.12.12 (48); 0.14.13 (55)	Umpires: David Coldrick (Ireland) & Brett Rosebury (Australia); Television broadcast: TBA
Kavanagh	Goals	Ni
Coulter 2, M. Murphy 2, Begley, McKernan, McDonnell, B. Murphy, Brogan, Kennelly, Cavanagh	Overs	Green 4, Swan 3, Goodes 2, Banfield 2, Montagna, McVeigh, Betts
Canty, Begley, McKernan, Coulter, Walsh, M. Murphy, Clarke	Best	Swan, Green, Banfield, Gibbs, Frawley, Fletcher, Goodes
Nil	Injuries	Nil
Australia win series 102–92 on aggregate

== See also ==
- International rules football
- Gaelic football
- Australian rules football
- Comparison of Australian rules football and Gaelic football
