= List of Australian Football League season disposal leaders =

This is a list of Australian Football League season disposal (kicks and handballs combined) leaders.

Year	Leader	Team	Disposals (inc. finals)
2026	Nick Daicos	Collingwood	797
2025	Noah Anderson	Gold Coast	752
2024	Tom Green	GWS	770
2023	Stephen Coniglio	GWS	706
2022	Clayton Oliver	Melbourne	703
2021	Jack Macrae	Western Bulldogs	880
2020	Lachie Neale	Brisbane Lions	511
2019	Adam Treloar	Collingwood	789
2018	Tom Mitchell	Hawthorn	848
2017	Matt Crouch	Adelaide	825
2016	Dan Hannebery	Sydney	802
2015	Sam Mitchell	Hawthorn	748
2014	Jordan Lewis	Hawthorn	668
2013	Dane Swan	Collingwood	717
2012	Dayne Beams	Collingwood	741
2011	Dane Swan	Collingwood	760
2010	Dane Swan	Collingwood	820
2009	Dane Swan	Collingwood	769
2008	Joel Corey	Geelong	730
2007	Kane Cornes	Port Adelaide	696
2006	Scott West	Western Bulldogs	708
2005	Scott West	Western Bulldogs	637
2004	Nigel Lappin	Brisbane Lions	630
2003	Nathan Buckley	Collingwood	650
2002	Simon Black	Brisbane Lions	582
2001	Simon Black	Brisbane Lions	622
2000	Brett Ratten	Carlton	695
1999	Brett Ratten	Carlton	670
1998	Robert Harvey	St Kilda	735
1997	Robert Harvey	St Kilda	756
1996	Robert Harvey	St Kilda	597
1995	Liam Pickering	Geelong	629
1994	Greg Williams	Carlton	642
1993	Greg Williams	Carlton	664
1992	Chris McDermott	Adelaide	720
1991	Barry Mitchell	Sydney	689
1990	Tony Shaw	Collingwood	736
1989	Paul Couch	Geelong	700
1988	Barry Mitchell	Sydney	616
1987	John Platten	Hawthorn	633
1986	Greg Williams	Sydney	690
1985	Greg Williams	Geelong	675
1984	Tony Shaw	Collingwood	676
1983	Terry Wallace	Hawthorn	765
1982	Terry Wallace	Hawthorn	635
1981	Peter Featherby	Geelong	662
1980	Garry Wilson	Fitzroy	631
1979	Garry Wilson	Fitzroy	690
1978	Garry Wilson	Fitzroy	646
1977	John Murphy	Fitzroy	599
1976	Garry Wilson	Fitzroy	570
1975	Barry Davis	North Melbourne	586
1974	Kevin Bartlett	Richmond	617

== Multiple Leaders ==
Times	Player	Years
4	Garry Wilson	1976, 1978, 1979, 1980
4	Greg Williams	1985, 1986, 1993, 1994
4	Dane Swan	2009, 2010, 2011, 2013
3	Robert Harvey	1996, 1997, 1998
2	Terry Wallace	1982, 1983
2	Tony Shaw	1984, 1990
2	Barry Mitchell	1988, 1991
2	Brett Ratten	1999, 2000
2	Simon Black	2001, 2002
2	Scott West	2005, 2006
