= Conor McManus =

Irish Gaelic footballer

Personal information
- Born: 30 November 1987 (age 38) Clontibret, County Monaghan
- Height: 1.83 m (6 ft 0 in)

Sport
- Sport: Gaelic football
- Position: Left corner forward
Club
- Years: Club
- Clontibret O'Neills
Club titles
- Monaghan titles: 7
Inter-county*
Years	County	Apps (scores)
2007–2024	Monaghan	78 (9-291)
Inter-county titles
- Ulster titles: 2
- All Stars: 3
- *Inter County team apps and scores correct as of 12 May 2025.

Vincent Conor McManus is a Gaelic footballer who formerly played at senior level for the Monaghan county team. Often referred to as one of his county's best-ever players, he is Monaghan's top scorer in National Football League history.

After winning the 2013 Ulster Senior Football Championship with Monaghan, he was hauled down by Sean Cavanagh in sight of goal in the All-Ireland quarter-final, with Monaghan losing only by two points in the end. McManus was later named in the 23-man Ireland squad for the 2013 International Rules Series against Australia. He scored two goals in the second Test against Australia at Croke Park and won the man of the match award, as Ireland earned a record-breaking victory. On 8 November 2013, McManus won an All Star at corner-forward. He added a second All Star in 2015 after winning his second Ulster Championship that year, having scored 1-26. During a club match with Clontibret O'Neills in spring 2014, he suffered a knee injury that kept him out until the Ulster Football Championship quarter-final against Tyrone. He won another county championship medal as Clontibret came back from a five-point deficit to win 1-10 to 1-09 against Scotstown. McManus enjoyed a good 2015 Ulster Final when scoring six points in an 0-11 to 0-10 win for the Farney Men against Donegal. McManus also scored no fewer than 0-12 in a 1-14 to 0-16 loss to All-Ireland champions Dublin in the National League Division 1 on 27 February 2016. He was the top scorer in that year's National League with 2-43.

Selected for Ireland in the 2014 International Rules Test, McManus won the GAA medal as the Irish player of the series against Australia. He was a scoring asset for Ireland in the 2015 test match, which Ireland won, before winning a second GAA medal in the 2017 International Rules Series for his performance in a losing Irish side.

== Career statistics ==
- As of 27 July 2018

Team	Season	Total	
Team	Season	Apps	Score
Monaghan	2007	5	0-01
Monaghan	2008	4	0-03
Monaghan	2009	3	0-05
Monaghan	2010	4	0-07
Monaghan	2011	2	0-07
Monaghan	2012	3	0-07
Monaghan	2013	4	0-19
Monaghan	2014	6	1-27
Monaghan	2015	4	1-26
Monaghan	2016	4	1-24
Monaghan	2017	7	2-31
Monaghan	2018	9	2-47
Total		55	7-204

== Honours ==
- Ulster Senior Football Championship (2): 2013, 2015
- National Football League, Division 2 (1): 2014
- National Football League, Division 3 (1): 2013
- International Rules Series (4): 2013, 2014, 2015 (GAA Medal), 2017 (GAA Medal)
- All Star (3): 2013, 2015, 2018
