= Karl O'Connell =

Monaghan Gaelic footballer

Personal information
- Native name: Karl Ó Conaill (Irish)
- Born: 13 September 1987 (age 39) Clones, County Monaghan, Ireland
- Height: 1.9 m (6 ft 3 in)

Sport
- Sport: Gaelic football
- Position: Left half back
Club
- Years: Club
- 2011–: Tyholland
Club titles
- All-Ireland Titles: Monaghan
Inter-county titles
- Ulster titles: 2
- All Stars: 1

Karl O'Connell is a Gaelic footballer who plays at senior level for the Monaghan county team.

On 25 October 2017, O'Connell was named in the Ireland squad for the 2017 International Rules Series against Australia in November.
