= 2014 AFL Mark of the Year =

- Date: 7 June
- Location: Adelaide Oval
- Winner: Chad Wingard (Port Adelaide)

The Australian Football League celebrates the best mark of the season through the annual Mark of the Year competition. In 2014, this is officially known as the Lifebroker AFL Mark of the Year. Each round three marks are nominated and fans are able to vote online for their favourite.

== Winners by Round ==
Legend

= Round's Winning Mark

Round	Nominees	Team	% of votes	Opposition	Ground
1	Jay Schulz	Port Adelaide	41%	Carlton	Etihad Stadium
1	Jarrad Waite	Carlton	48%	Port Adelaide	Etihad Stadium
1	Callan Ward	Greater Western Sydney	11%	Sydney	Spotless Stadium
2	David Armitage	St Kilda	50%	Greater Western Sydney	Etihad Stadium
2	Lachie Hunter	Western Bulldogs	9%	North Melbourne	Etihad Stadium
2	Jarryd Roughead	Hawthorn	41%	Essendon	Etihad Stadium
3	Jamie Elliott	Collingwood	78%	Geelong	MCG
3	Jack Riewoldt	Richmond	14%	Western Bulldogs	Etihad Stadium
3	Cyril Rioli	Hawthorn	9%	Fremantle	MCG
4	Sam Day	Gold Coast	47%	Hawthorn	Metricon Stadium
4	Jeremy Howe	Melbourne	14%	Carlton	MCG
4	Tom Jonas	Port Adelaide	40%	Brisbane Lions	Adelaide Oval
5	George Horlin-Smith	Geelong	64%	Hawthorn	MCG
5	Jack Riewoldt	Richmond	7%	Brisbane Lions	The Gabba
5	Scott Thompson	Adelaide	29%	Greater Western Sydney	Adelaide Oval
6	Jeremy Howe	Melbourne	6%	Sydney	MCG
6	James Kelly	Geelong	13%	Port Adelaide	Adelaide Oval
6	Matt Rosa	West Coast	81%	Carlton	Etihad Stadium
7	Travis Cloke	Collingwood	14%	Carlton	MCG
7	James Podsiadly	Adelaide	6%	Melbourne	Adelaide Oval
7	Mitch Robinson	Carlton	80%	Collingwood	MCG
8	Jeremy Howe	Melbourne	11%	Western Bulldogs	MCG
8	Brad Sheppard	West Coast	11%	Greater Western Sydney	Patersons Stadium
8	Chad Wingard	Port Adelaide	78%	Fremantle	Adelaide Oval
9	Harley Bennell	Gold Coast	11%	St Kilda	Etihad Stadium
9	Nat Fyfe	Fremantle	82%	Geelong	Patersons Stadium
9	Max Gawn	Melbourne	7%	Richmond	MCG
10	Jack Riewoldt	Richmond	4%	Greater Western Sydney	Spotless Stadium
10	Jarrad Waite	Carlton	49%	Adelaide	MCG
10	Justin Westhoff	Port Adelaide	47%	Hawthorn	Adelaide Oval
11	Brent Harvey	North Melbourne	13%	West Coast	Patersons Stadium
11	Will Hoskin-Elliott	Greater Western Sydney	39%	Hawthorn	MCG
11	Jeremy Howe	Melbourne	48%	Port Adelaide	TIO Traeger Park
12	Jeremy Howe	Melbourne	6%	Collingwood	MCG
12	Joel Selwood	Geelong	4%	Carlton	Etihad Stadium
12	Chad Wingard	Port Adelaide	90%	St Kilda	Adelaide Oval
13	Levi Casboult	Carlton	71%	Hawthorn	MCG
13	Tom Lynch	Gold Coast	2%	West Coast	Patersons Stadium
13	James Podsiadly	Adelaide	27%	North Melbourne	Adelaide Oval
14	Aaron Edwards	Richmond	5%	Sydney	MCG
14	Troy Menzel	Carlton	55%	Greater Western Sydney	Spotless Stadium
14	Paul Puopolo	Hawthorn	40%	Collingwood	MCG
15	Sam Gray	Port Adelaide	76%	Adelaide	Adelaide Oval
15	Jay Schulz	Port Adelaide	14%	Adelaide	Adelaide Oval
15	Jarrod Witts	Collingwood	10%	Carlton	MCG
16	Rory Laird	Adelaide	23%	Greater Western Sydney	Spotless Stadium
16	Marc Murphy	Carlton	71%	St Kilda	Etihad Stadium
16	Drew Petrie	North Melbourne	6%	Hawthorn	Etihad Stadium
17	Marcus Bontempelli	Western Bulldogs	30%	Gold Coast	Cazaly's Stadium
17	Jack Gunston	Hawthorn	54%	Adelaide	Adelaide Oval
17	Rory Sloane	Adelaide	16%	Hawthorn	Adelaide Oval
18	Lance Franklin	Sydney	24%	Hawthorn	MCG
18	Lindsay Thomas	North Melbourne	25%	Carlton	Etihad Stadium
18	Lee Spurr	Fremantle	51%	St Kilda	Etihad Stadium
19	Robbie Gray	Port Adelaide	51%	Collingwood	MCG
19	Will Hoskin-Elliott	Greater Western Sydney	25%	Richmond	MCG
19	Daniel McStay	Brisbane Lions	24%	Melbourne	Etihad Stadium
20	Nat Fyfe	Fremantle	29%	Geelong	Simonds Stadium
20	Chris Mayne	Fremantle	6%	Geelong	Simonds Stadium
20	Paul Puopolo	Hawthorn	65%	Melbourne	MCG
21	Mitch Brown	West Coast	13%	Essendon	Etihad Stadium
21	Heath Hocking	Essendon	72%	West Coast	Etihad Stadium
21	Nic Naitanui	West Coast	15%	Essendon	Etihad Stadium
22	Jake Carlisle	Essendon	5%	Gold Coast	Etihad Stadium
22	Nathan Gordon	Richmond	39%	St Kilda	MCG
22	Brendon Goddard	Essendon	56%	Gold Coast	Etihad Stadium
23	Paul Chapman	Essendon	4%	Carlton	MCG
23	Zac Dawson	Fremantle	91%	Port Adelaide	Patersons Stadium
23	Jarryd Roughead	Hawthorn	5%	Collingwood	MCG

== 2014 Finalists ==
Round	Nominees	Team	Opposition	Ground	Description
3	Jamie Elliott	Collingwood	Geelong	MCG	The Magpie pocket rocket defies physics and Jimmy Bartel to launch into orbit
12	Chad Wingard	Port Adelaide	St Kilda	Adelaide Oval	Sean Dempster plays stepladder for one of 2014's most dazzling performers
13	Levi Casboult	Carlton	Hawthorn	MCG	The big Blue recalls the great Wayne Carey with this remarkable pack

== See also ==
- Mark of the Year
- Goal of the Year
- 2014 AFL Goal of the Year
- 2014 AFL season
