= International Rules Series =

International football competition

International Rules Series (IRS)
- Sport: International rules football
- Founded: 1967 (Australian Football World Tour)
- First season: 1984
- No. of teams: 2
- Country: Australia (Republic of Ireland) Ireland
- Continent: Australia (Continent); Europe
- Most recent champion: Australia (10th title)
- Most titles: Australia; Ireland (10 titles each)
- Broadcasters: Seven Network (Australia); RTÉ (Ireland)

The International Rules Series was a senior men's international rules football competition between the Australia international rules football team (selected by the Australian Football League) and the Ireland international rules football team (selected by the Gaelic Athletic Association). International rules football is played using a set of compromise rules devised by both governing bodies. While the International Rules Series matches use some rules from Australian rules football, the field, ball and uniforms of both teams are derived from Gaelic football.

The competition originated in the 1980s, with four series played in that decade. It was contested annually between 1998 and 2006, and then featured sporadically over the next eleven years, with the last series contested in 2017 and no future series formally scheduled. At the height of its popularity, the series attracted high numbers of spectators and interest in both countries, being played over two Test matches in October/November after the completion of the AFL Grand Final and the All-Ireland Football Final, which were both traditionally played in late September.

== History ==
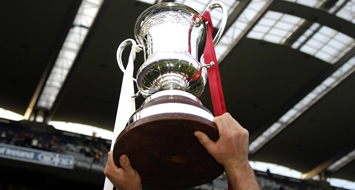
The Cormac McAnallen Cup presented to the International Rules Series winners

The two teams contest a trophy, which in 2004 was named the Cormac McAnallen Cup—after the Tyrone team captain Cormac McAnallen, whose death that year from a heart condition at 24 years old came after he had represented Ireland in the previous three series.

The concept for the series originates from the Australian Football World Tour, which took place in 1967 and 1968. The tour saw a collection of Australian footballers from the VFL, SANFL and WAFL competitions travel to Ireland for an itinerary of matches played under modified Gaelic football rules.

The first proper series took place in Ireland in 1984 under a three-match format, whereby the team accumulating the most wins from the series were victors. Following poor Australian crowds and a relative lack of interest in 1990, the series was revived in 1998 under a two-match aggregate points format. The popularity of the series saw it continue over the next eight years until violent on-field brawling in the mid-2000s saw it cancelled in 2007.

A women's series was staged in Ireland in 2006, which to this date remains the only women's series to have taken place between the nations. A series for under-17 boys was held each year between 1999 and 2006 before it was abandoned.

The series returned in 2008, although it featured randomly on the calendar over the next decade, going unscheduled in 2009, 2012, 2016, and in 2018–2019. Since 2014, the Australian team has endeavoured to pick players who have been selected in an All-Australian team on at least one occasion in their careers. This followed the 2013 series, which was notable for the inclusion of an Australian team made up of exclusively Indigenous players, known as the Indigenous All-Stars. Ireland inflicted the largest victory in the history of the series, scoring a record-breaking 79-point win in the second Test that resulted in a record-breaking 101-point aggregate victory. The most recent series (2017) was won by Australia.

A return series was initially scheduled for Ireland in 2020, with a follow-up series in Australia intended for 2022, but these were cancelled in early 2020 amidst the COVID-19 pandemic. In 2024 and 2025 there were ongoing discussions between the AFL and GAA about the revival of the series. In June 2026, AFL.com.au reported that both organisations were "working towards a return in 2027".

== Results ==
Series results, up to and including the 2017 series.

Flag	Icon	Country	Series won	Series lost	Test wins	Test draws*	Test losses
(Republic of Ireland)		Ireland	10	10	21	2	19
(Australia)		Australia	10	10	19	2	21
^{*}Two draws (second Test, 1999; second Test, 2002)

=== Uniforms ===
Australia (1984)	Ireland (1984)	Australia (1986)	Ireland (1986)	Australia (1987)	Ireland (1987)

== Venues ==
The following are lists of International Rules Series venues and their locations, ordered by number of test matches hosted:

=== Ireland ===
Venue	City/Town	County	Number of tests hosted and Year/s
Croke Park	Dublin	County Dublin	17 (Note: 2nd & 3rd tests 1984, 1st 2nd & 3rd tests 1987, 1st & 2nd tests 1998, 1st & 2nd tests 2000, 1st & 2nd tests 2002, 1st & 2nd tests 2004, 2nd test 2006, 2nd test 2010, 2nd test 2013, 1st and only test 2015)
Páirc Uí Chaoimh (O'Keefe Park)	Ballintemple	County Cork	1 (1st Test 1984)
Pearse Stadium	Salthill	County Galway	1 (1st Test 2006)
Gaelic Grounds	Limerick	County Limerick	1 (1st Test 2010)
Breffni Park	Cavan	County Cavan	1 (1st Test 2013)

=== Australia ===
Venue	City/Town	State/Territory	Number of tests hosted and Year/s
Subiaco Oval	Perth	Western Australia	5 (Note: 1st Test 2003, 1st Test 2005, 1st Test 2008, 1st & only Test 2014, 2nd Test 2017)
Melbourne Cricket Ground	Melbourne	Victoria	4 (Note: 1st test 1999, 1st test 2001, 2nd test 2003, 2nd test 2008)
SANFL Park	Adelaide	South Australia	3 (3rd Test 1986, 2nd Test 1999, 1st Test 2001)
WACA Ground	Perth	Western Australia	2 (1st Test 1986 & 3rd Test 1990)
VFL Park	Melbourne	Victoria	2 (2nd Test 1986 & 1st Test 1990)
Docklands Stadium	Melbourne	Victoria	2 (2nd Test 2005 & 1st Test 2011)
Canberra Stadium	Canberra	Australian Capital Territory	1 (2nd Test 1990)
Carrara Stadium	Gold Coast	Queensland	1 (2nd Test 2011)
Adelaide Oval	Adelaide	South Australia	1 (1st Test 2017)

== Player awards ==
=== Jim Stynes Medal ===
The Jim Stynes Medal is awarded to the best player of the Australian team for each series. It was first awarded in 1998 and named after Jim Stynes, who won the All-Ireland Minor Football Championship with Dublin before joining Melbourne. With the Demons, he won the 1991 Brownlow Medal, set the record for most VFL or AFL consecutive games played (with 244), was named in Melbourne's Team of the Century, and was elected into the Australian Football Hall of Fame while also playing for both Ireland and Australia in the series. He was also honoured with a state funeral in Melbourne when he died in 2012.

- 1998 – Stephen Silvagni (Carlton)
- 1999 – Jason Akermanis (Brisbane)
- 2000 – James Hird (Essendon)
- 2001 – Matthew Lloyd (Essendon)
- 2002 – Andrew Kellaway (Richmond)
- 2003 – Brent Harvey (North Melbourne)
- 2004 – Nathan Brown (Richmond)
- 2005 – Andrew McLeod (Adelaide)
- 2006 – Ryan O'Keefe (Sydney)
- 2008 – Kade Simpson (Carlton)
- 2010 – Dane Swan (Collingwood)
- 2011 – James Kelly (Geelong)
- 2013 – Ashley McGrath (Brisbane)
- 2014 – Luke Hodge (Hawthorn)
- 2015 – Harry Taylor (Geelong)
- 2017 – Nat Fyfe (Fremantle)

=== GAA Medal ===
The GAA Medal (also known as the Irish Player of the Series) is awarded in similar circumstances to the Australian award, whereby the Irish player adjudged as the best performed from each series wins the medal. It has been awarded since 2004.

- 2004 – Stephen Cluxton (Dublin)
- 2005 – Tom Kelly (Laois)
- 2006 – Alan Brogan (Dublin)
- 2008 – Graham Canty (Cork)
- 2010 – Colm Begley (Laois)
- 2011 – Tadhg Kennelly (Kerry/Sydney)
- 2013 – Ciarán Sheehan (Cork/Carlton)
- 2014 – Conor McManus (Monaghan)
- 2015 – Bernard Brogan (Dublin)
- 2017 – Conor McManus (Monaghan) (2)

=== Harry Beitzel Medal ===
The Harry Beitzel Medal was awarded to players adjudged "fairest and best" on the field during the 1984 to 1990 series. Beitzel was honoured for his pioneering of the sport and the fact that he arranged the first ever official contact between the two sports of Gaelic football and Australian rules football.

- 1984 – Jimmy Kerrigan (Ireland)
- 1986 – Robert Dipierdomenico (Australia)
- 1987 – Tony McGuinness (Australia)
- 1990 – Jack O'Shea (Ireland)

== Sponsorship ==
The Australian team were sponsored until 2006 by Foster's, which also sponsored series held in Australia. Toyota took over both roles for the 2008 series. Australian plastic manufacturer Nylex sponsored the Australian team in 2010, whilst Toyota and Carlton Draught were guernsey sponsors for the 2011 series. Supermarket chain Coles and community health group National Aboriginal Community Controlled Health Organisation (NACCHO) were guernsey sponsors for the 2013 series. Airline company Virgin Australia and Gatorade have sponsored the Australian teams since 2014.

The Irish team, and all series held in Ireland, were sponsored by Coca-Cola until 2008. The 2010 and 2013 series in Ireland was sponsored by the Irish Daily Mail, while Irish language television station TG4 sponsored the Irish team in 2010, 2011 and 2013. Gaelic games online streaming service GAAGO.ie were sponsors of the Irish team in 2014 and 2015, whilst electric power transmission company EirGrid were the title sponsors of the 2015 series in Ireland.

== Audience ==
=== Television ===
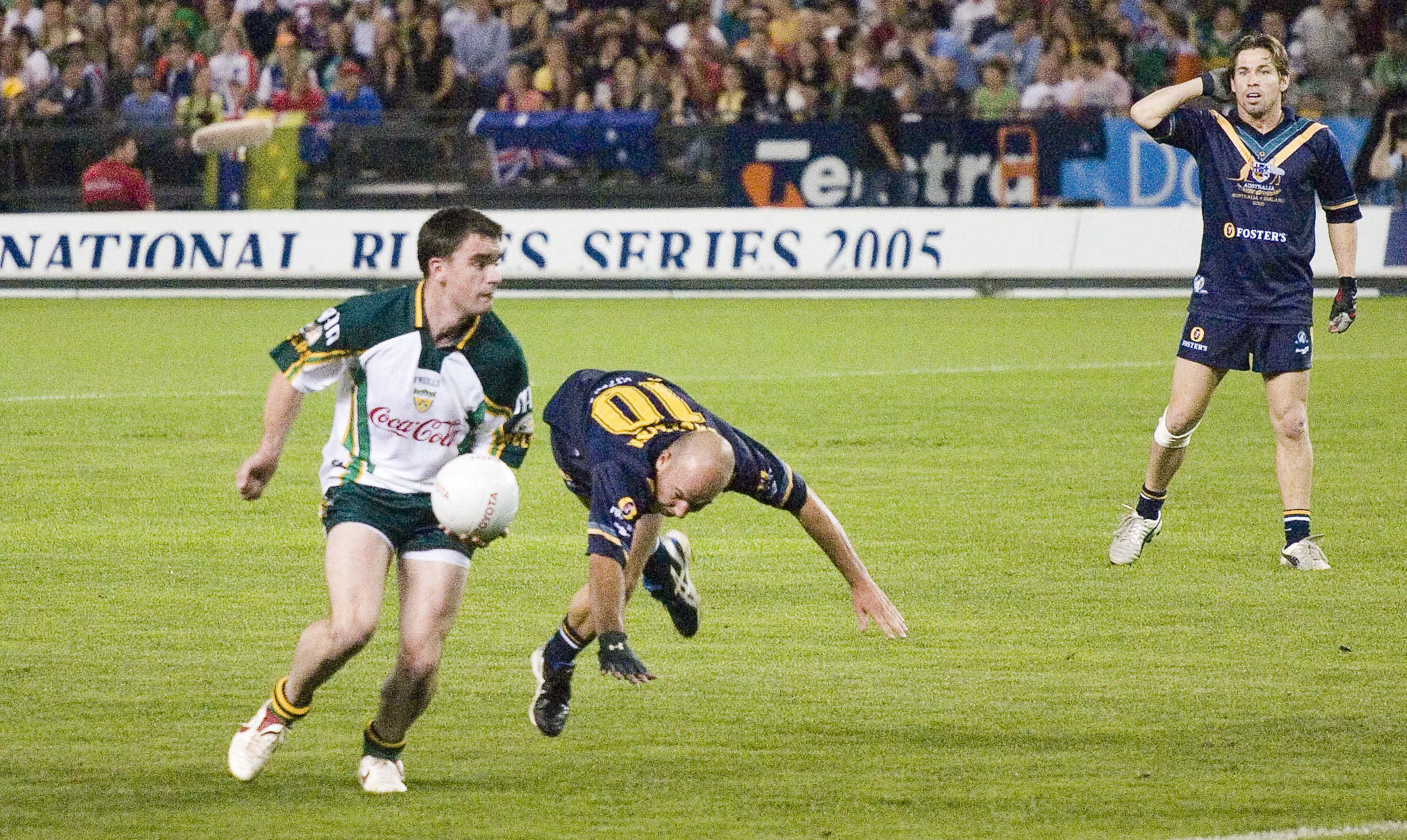
Action from the second Test of the 2005 International Rules Series

The International Rules Series has been broadcast on television in Australia and Ireland since the late 1990s. In Ireland it has usually been broadcast on RTÉ Two; from 2010 to 2014 the series was broadcast live by Irish-language channel TG4. RTÉ reclaimed the rights to the series in 2015. In Australia, the Seven Network broadcast the 1998–2000 series, whilst the Nine Network broadcast the 2001–2005 series. In Australia the 2006 and 2011 series were broadcast on Network Ten, though all other series have been broadcast on the Seven Network and simulcast on Fox Sports.

The series has had reach into global markets. From 2005, broadcasting extended its reach to the United States via Setanta Sports North America and to Hong Kong via the Australia Network. The 2006 series was broadcast to the United Kingdom via Setanta Sports 2. Defunct New Zealand free-to-air sports network Sommet Sports broadcast the 2013 and 2014 series. The 2014 Test match was broadcast live in the United States and parts of Europe and Asia.

=== Attendance ===
The series alternates host countries each appropriate year between Ireland and Australia. Since the commencement of the modern era series in 1998, the average attendance up to the conclusion of the 2017 series was 34,337. On two occasions, Test matches have sold out in Australia, both in Perth in 2003 and 2014. The first entire series to sell out was in Ireland in 2006 when a combined crowd record of 112,127 was set. The attendance at the second Test of 82,127 at Croke Park was the largest for an international sports fixture in the country.

Total attendance	1,442,161
Average attendance	34,337
Average Australian attendance	31,504
Average Irish attendance	37,171
Highest attendance	82,127; 11 May 2006

Up to date as of 2017 Series

== Criticisms ==
The series has sustained criticism from several high-profile figures in its parent sports. Three-time All-Ireland-winning Tyrone manager Mickey Harte has repeatedly called for the series to be disbanded. He stated in 2008 that the tours to Australia are simply a free holiday for the players involved, before repeating the claim in 2011 and calling on the GAA to withdraw from the Series because it does a "total disservice to the development of Gaelic games on the international stage". Australian journalists such as Mike Sheahan have argued that the relevance of the series diminished once the Australian side was no longer made up primarily of All-Australian players, although the team returned to exclusively using All-Australians in 2014. Ex-Kerry footballer Tomás Ó Sé panned the GAA in 2019 for continuing to maintain friendly relations with the AFL, arguing that the series was primarily responsible for AFL clubs scouting emerging Irish talent and leaving clubs and counties with no compensation for their efforts.

== Future of the series ==
The future of the series was brought into doubt in 2005 and 2006, mostly through the on-field actions of some Australian players and excessive physicality by both teams. In December 2006, the GAA decided to abandon the 2007 series, issuing a public statement: "On the recommendation of the Management Committee, it was agreed that there would be no Junior or Senior Series of games in 2007 ... Dessie Farrell, the player's representative[,] stated that while there would be some disappointment amongst players that the 2007 Series will not take place, the decision was, in his view, probably a wise one."

Talks between the two organisations resumed in 2007, and the 2008 series went ahead without incident. Since then, despite an Australian withdrawal from the 2009 series due to "economic concerns", the series appeared to have a strong future. However, following the 2011 series, concerns were raised over relatively small crowd attendances. The small crowds were blamed on a lack of high-profile AFL players being selected in the Australian team as well as a longer AFL season. The series' temporary future was assured by GAA director general Paraic Duffy. During the 2013 series, the possibility of expanding future International Rules games into a tri-series was mooted, in such a way that the series would incorporate the Indigenous All-Stars team that participated in 2013, possibly against an AFL All-Star team for the right to play off against the Irish. Though this idea never eventuated, the AFL has expressed interest in staging an exhibition Test match in the United States, likely in Boston or New York City.

Whilst an extremely lopsided result occurred in the 2013 series and the Australians were accused of demonstrating apathy to the concept, a 2014 series featuring current and former All-Australian players occurred, one that was nevertheless regarded as a demonstrable success. During a successful training camp in New York City ahead of the 2015 series, Australian coach Alastair Clarkson gave his strongest pitch yet for the expansion of the series to include a Test match in America and even an actual American international rules team, to facilitate a tri-nations format. In May 2016, the GAA and AFL announced an agreement to not have a Test match in 2016 and instead renew the 2-match aggregate series in 2017 (in Australia), with a view to conducting further series in the following years in both Ireland and the United States.

The associations agreed to series in 2020 and 2022, but the 2020 series was cancelled due to the COVID-19 pandemic; and, via announcement on 25 December 2022, the 2022 series was delayed, with Mick Malthouse expected to be re-appointed coach of the Australian team.

In May 2023, GAA president Larry McCarthy ruled out a return of the International Rules Series for the foreseeable future, citing that the current GAA calendar would ask players to choose between their local club and representing their country.

A masters series featuring teams made up of players aged 40 and above and Ladies' series, selected from the respective AFL and GAA Masters leagues, have sporadically been played. In 2024, an over-40 men's, over-50 men's and over-40 women's series was played in and won comprehensively by Ireland in each division; it featured former AFL player Jason Akermanis as head coach of one of the Australian teams.

In both 2024 and 2025, it was reported that the AFL and GAA were exploring the return of fixtures between the two nations, though as of 2026 no matches have been scheduled.

== See also ==
- Australian rules football
- Comparison of Gaelic football and Australian rules football
- Gaelic football
- International rules football
  - Australian international rules football team
  - Ireland international rules football team
- 2026 AFL Women's Australia v Ireland match
