= Chad Wingard =

Australian rules footballer (born 1993)

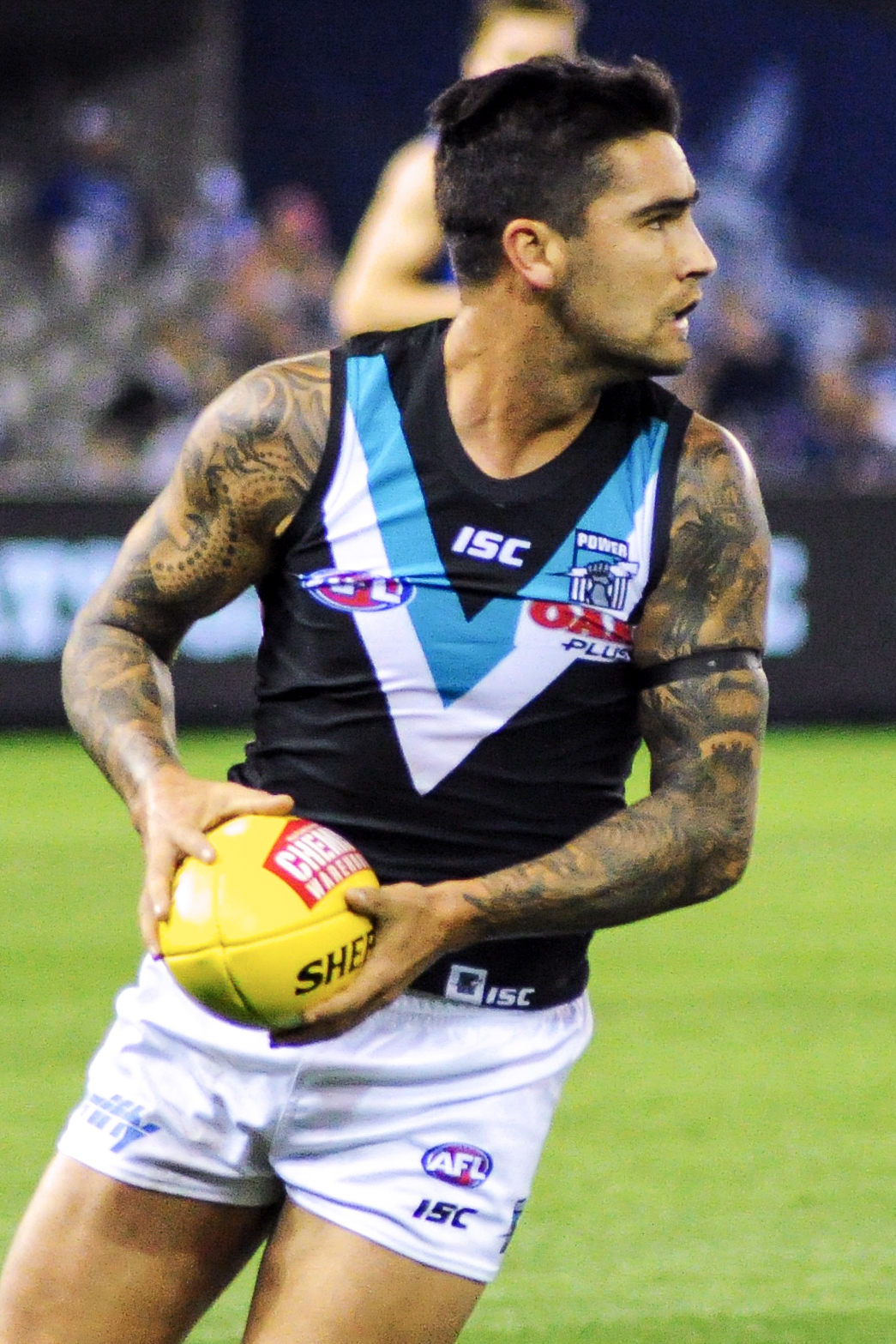
- Wingard playing for Hawthorn in April 2019

Personal information
- Full name: Chad Jordan Wingard
- Nickname: Chooka
- Born: 29 July 1993 (age 33); Murray Bridge, Australia
- Original teams: Imperial (RMFL), Sturt (SANFL)
- Draft: No. 6, 2011 national draft (Port Adelaide); No. 1, 2023 pre-season draft (Hawthorn)
- Debut: Round 1, 2012, Port Adelaide vs. St Kilda, at AAMI Stadium
- Height: 183 cm (6 ft 0 in)
- Weight: 82 kg (181 lb)
- Position: Midfielder / forward

Playing career^{1}
Years	Club	Games (Goals)
2012–2018	Port Adelaide	147 (232)
2019–2024	Hawthorn	71 (68)
Total		218 (300)

International team honours^{2}
Years	Team	Games (Goals)
2013	Indigenous All-Stars	1 (0)
2014–2017	Australia	3 (0)
- ^{1} Playing statistics correct to the end of 2024.^{2} Representative statistics correct as of 2017.

Career highlights
- 2× All-Australian team: 2013, 2015; John Cahill Medal: 2013; 2× Port Adelaide leading goalkicker: 2015, 2016; Showdown Medal: R19, 2013; Mark of the Year: 2014; South Australia U18s captain: 2011

Chad Jordan Wingard (born 29 July 1993) is a former professional Australian rules footballer who played for the Port Adelaide Football Club and the Hawthorn Football Club in the Australian Football League (AFL). He was drafted to Port Adelaide with the sixth selection in the 2011 AFL draft from the Sturt Football Club in the South Australian Football League (SANFL).

== Early life and education ==
Wingard was born on 29 July 1993 in Murray Bridge, South Australia. His father, Trevor, is Aboriginal man, and his mother Julie is Irish. His father is a descendant of Kudnarto, who is notable for being the first Aboriginal woman to legally marry a European settler in the colony of South Australia, making legal history in 1848. As of 2018, mother Julie worked at an emergency accommodation centre.

Wingard has an older brother and a younger brother, as well as five younger foster siblings.

He attended school to year 12 in Murray Bridge.

At 16 and 60 kg, Wingard was a member of Murray Bridge's 2009 Imperial Football Club league team that won the River Murray Football League premiership, kicking five goals including three of most freakish you'd wish to see", according to the coach. Wingard also played basketball as a child, and was the captain of South Australia's under-16 basketball team.

== AFL career ==
Wingard made his debut for Port Adelaide in round 1, 2012 against St Kilda. His breakout game came during Port Adelaide's round 22, 2012 loss to the Brisbane Lions where he received an AFL Rising Star nomination for his 27 disposal, 1 goal and 5 mark performance.

For season 2013, which was only his second season, he averaged 21.3 disposals a game and kicked 43 goals. He was named in the 2013 All-Australian team, making him the youngest player to make an All-Australian team since Mark Ricciuto in 1994. Wingard's 2013 season also saw him win the Showdown Medal for his five-goal performance in round 19 against the Adelaide Crows where he was described after the match as "Port's most exciting player since Gavin Wanganeen." At season's end, he was rewarded with the John Cahill Medal, making him the youngest player to win a best and fairest at Port Adelaide since Craig Bradley in 1982.

Wingard's 2014 season saw his averages drop from 21 disposals per game to 16 per game, however he still managed to kick 43 goals in total. He won the Mark of the Year in round 12 against St Kilda by jumping high on the shoulders of Sean Dempster.

Season 2015 is considered Wingard's greatest season to date. He booted a career high 53 goals to be the club's leading goal kicker of the season by kicking multiple goals in every game from rounds 8 to 22 as well as kicking at least one goal in every game until round 23. Wingard also averaged 19.2 disposals a game and was recognised with the All-Australian selection, a stunning achievement for a player having completed just his fourth year at AFL level.

At the conclusion of the 2018 season, Wingard sought a trade from Port Adelaide. He eventually requested a trade to Hawthorn, and was traded on 17 October.

At the end of the 2023 AFL season, Wingard was delisted by Hawthorn, but he was re-listed in the AFL rookie draft.

=== Hawthorn ===
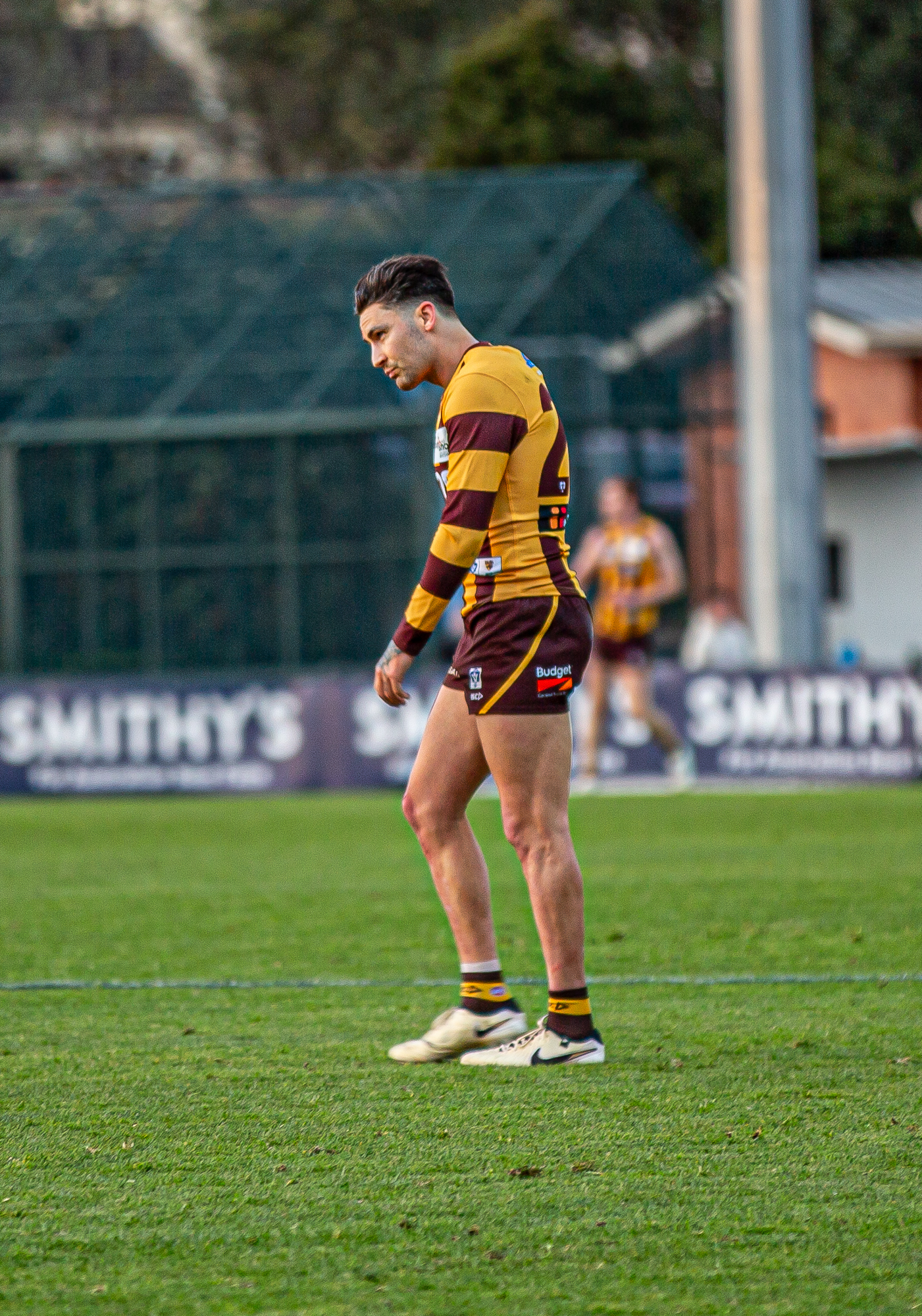
Wingard playing for Box Hill in the second elimination final of the 2024 VFL season – his final game before retirement from the AFL

Hawthorn traded its first round pick and promising youngster Ryan Burton for Wingard. During the preseason Wingard developed a calf complaint that forced him to miss all the warm up games and the first two games of the 2019 season. He made his debut for his new club against North Melbourne and kicked three goals to help win the match.

Since crossing to Hawthorn, Wingard had often had to deal with soft tissue injuries, causing him to miss games in every season. Wingard has signed a new contract at Hawthorn for 2024 even though he will spend most of 2024 in rehab after rupturing his Achilles tendon in round 22 of the 2023. Wingard did not play for Hawthorn throughout the 2024 AFL season, and announced his retirement following the conclusion of the home-and-away season. Wingard played 218 games across 12 years at Port Adelaide and Hawthorn.

== Statistics ==
Updated to the end of 2024.

Legend
G	Goals	K	Kicks	D	Disposals	T	Tackles
B	Behinds	H	Handballs	M	Marks

Season	Team	No.	Games	Totals							Averages (per game)							Votes
Season	Team	No.	Games	G	B	K	H	D	M	T	G	B	K	H	D	M	T	Votes
2012	Port Adelaide	20	19	9	10	108	129	237	36	46	0.5	0.5	5.7	6.8	12.5	1.9	2.4	0
2013	Port Adelaide	20	24	43	20	309	200	509	104	47	1.8	0.8	12.9	8.3	21.2	4.3	2.0	8
2014	Port Adelaide	20	24	43	31	243	147	390	94	74	1.8	1.3	10.1	6.1	16.3	3.9	3.1	6
2015	Port Adelaide	20	22	53	27	270	152	422	85	67	2.4	1.2	12.3	6.9	19.2	3.9	3.1	6
2016	Port Adelaide	20	18	38	24	181	97	278	52	39	2.1	1.3	10.1	5.4	15.4	2.9	2.2	3
2017	Port Adelaide	20	19	24	25	262	159	421	82	63	1.3	1.3	13.8	8.4	22.2	4.3	3.3	4
2018	Port Adelaide	20	21	22	21	252	185	437	58	70	1.0	1.0	12.0	8.8	20.8	2.8	3.3	4
2019	Hawthorn	20	14	12	9	147	112	259	45	60	0.9	0.6	10.5	8.0	18.5	3.2	4.3	4
2020 (Note: The 2020 season was played with 17 home-and-away matches per team (down from 22) and 16-minute quarters with time on (down from 20-minute quarters with time on) due to the impact of the COVID-19 pandemic.)	Hawthorn	20	17	18	11	145	106	251	49	61	1.1	0.6	8.5	6.2	14.8	2.9	3.6	6
2021	Hawthorn	20	16	12	11	199	158	357	58	61	0.8	0.7	12.4	9.9	22.3	3.6	3.8	8
2022	Hawthorn	20	10	17	6	78	45	123	21	22	1.7	0.6	7.8	4.5	12.3	2.1	2.2	0
2023	Hawthorn	20	14	9	8	116	82	198	59	25	0.6	0.6	8.3	5.9	14.1	4.2	1.8	0
2024	Hawthorn	20	0	—	—	—	—	—	—	—	—	—	—	—	—	—	—	0
Career			218	300	203	2310	1572	3882	743	635	1.4	0.9	10.6	7.2	17.8	3.4	2.9	49

== Honours and achievements ==
Individual

- 2× All-Australian team: 2013, 2015
- John Cahill Medal: 2013
- Peter Crimmins Medal third-place: 2020
- 2× Port Adelaide leading club goalkicker: 2015, 2016
- Showdown Medal: R19, 2013
- AFL Rising Star nominee: 2012
- 2× Australian international rules football team: 2014, 2017
- Indigenous All-Stars team: 2013
- 3× 22 Under 22 team: 2013, 2014, 2015
- Hawthorn goal of the year: 2023
- Under 18 All-Australian team: 2011
- South Australia Under 18s captain: 2011
