= Jeremy Cameron =

Australian rules footballer (born 1993)

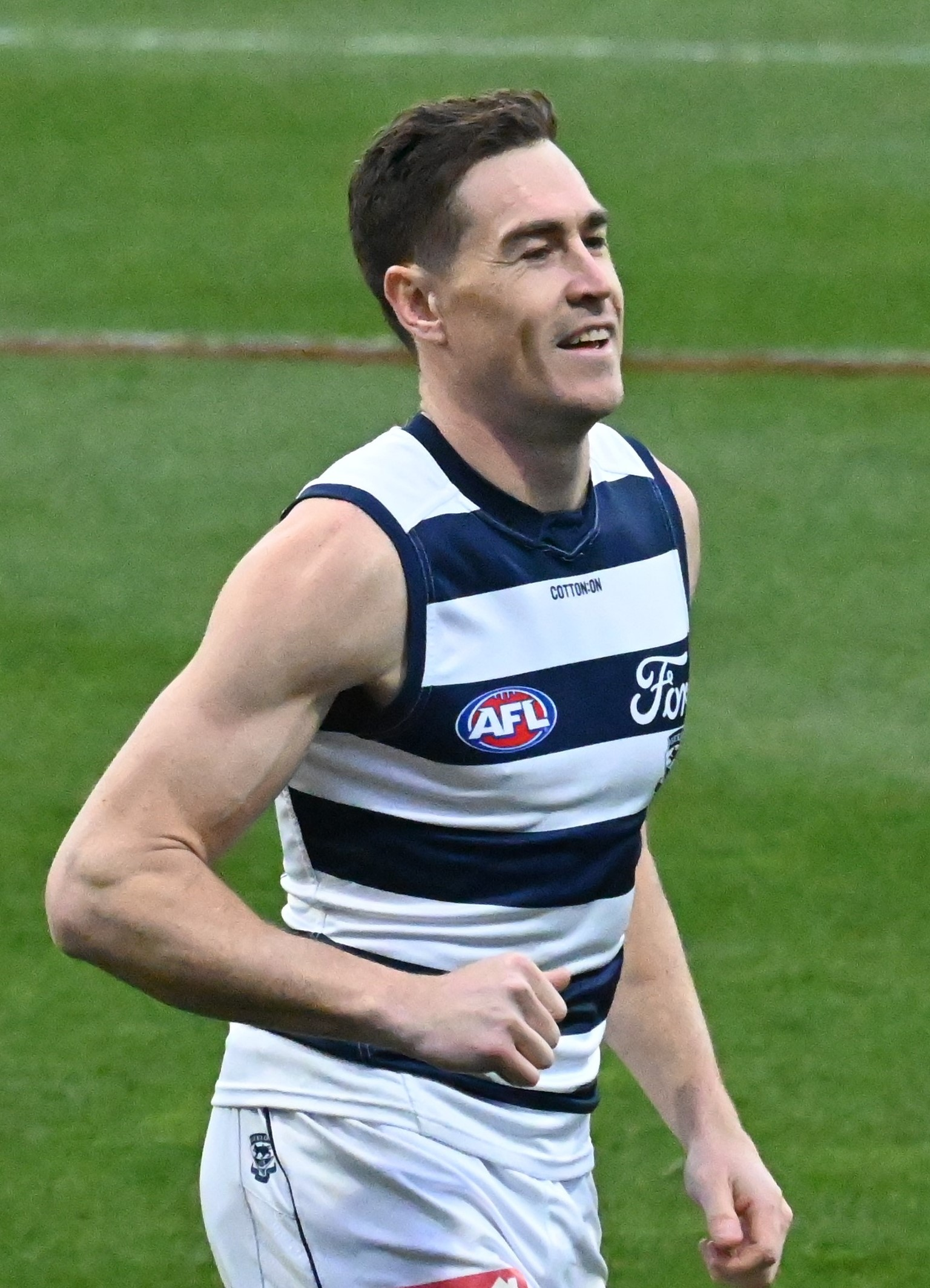
- Jeremy Cameron playing for Geelong in 2024

Personal information
- Full name: Jeremy Cameron
- Nicknames: Jezza, Darty, the Dart
- Born: 1 April 1993 (age 33); Dartmoor, Victoria
- Original team: North Ballarat Rebels (TAC Cup)
- Draft: 2010 GWS under-age selection
- Debut: Round 1, 2012, Greater Western Sydney vs. Sydney, at ANZ Stadium
- Height: 196 cm (6 ft 5 in)
- Weight: 94 kg (207 lb)
- Position: Key Forward

Club information
- Current club: Geelong
- Number: 5

Playing career^{1}
Years	Club	Games (Goals)
2012–2020	Greater Western Sydney	171 (427)
2021–	Geelong	128 (350)
Total		299 (777)

Representative team honours
Years	Team	Games (Goals)
2020	Victoria	1 (1)
- ^{1} Playing statistics correct to the end of 2026.

Career highlights
- AFL premiership player: 2022; 5× All-Australian team: 2013, 2019, 2022, 2024, 2025 (c); 2× Coleman Medal: 2019, 2025; Kevin Sheedy Medal: 2013; Carji Greeves Medal: 2022; 9× Greater Western Sydney leading goalkicker: 2012–2020; 3x Geelong leading goalkicker: 2023, 2024, 2025; AFLPA best first year player: 2012; AFLCA best young player of the year: 2013; 2× 22under22 team: 2013, 2015; AFL Rising Star nominee: 2012; Inaugural Greater Western Sydney AFL team

Jeremy Cameron (born 1 April 1993) is a professional footballer with the Geelong Football Club in the Australian Football League (AFL). He previously played for the Greater Western Sydney Giants from 2010 to 2020. Cameron has kicked the most goals (427) for Greater Western Sydney, and led the club's goalkicking in all nine of his seasons at the club, with his 67 goals in the 2019 home-and-away season earning him the Coleman Medal. He is also a five time All-Australian and won the Kevin Sheedy Medal in 2013. Cameron won his first premiership in 2022 with Geelong.

== Early life ==
Jeremy Cameron grew up in Dartmoor, a small town between Portland and Mount Gambier with a population of 150 people. Cameron first played football as a 14 year old for Dartmoor Reserves in the South West District Football League as the league doesn't have junior teams. He soon was promoted to the seniors but broke his wrist and missed the rest of the 2008 season. He played his first full season of football in 2009, kicking 69 goals playing against men as a 16 year old. Cameron began playing for the North Ballarat Rebels in TAC Cup Program in 2010, travelling over 250 km from home to Ballarat.

== AFL career ==
=== Greater Western Sydney (2012–2020) ===
==== 2012–2015: Early career ====
Jeremy Cameron was selected as a 17-year-old underage recruit by the Greater Western Sydney Giants in November 2010, a year prior to their inaugural season in the AFL. He spent 2011 playing for GWS in the NEAFL in preparation for their AFL entry. Cameron made his AFL debut on March 24, 2012, in the GWS Giants' first-ever AFL-Premiership-Season game in round 1 of the 2012 AFL Season, against Sydney. In round 2, Cameron kicked 4 goals against North Melbourne and was awarded the round 2 nomination for the 2012 AFL Rising Star, Cameron continued to show his promise when he kicked 5 goals against the Western Bulldogs in round 5, becoming the first ever GWS player to kick 5 goals in a game. Cameron finished his rookie season as the club's leading goal-kicker with 29 goals, from 16 games, averaging 1.8 goals a game.

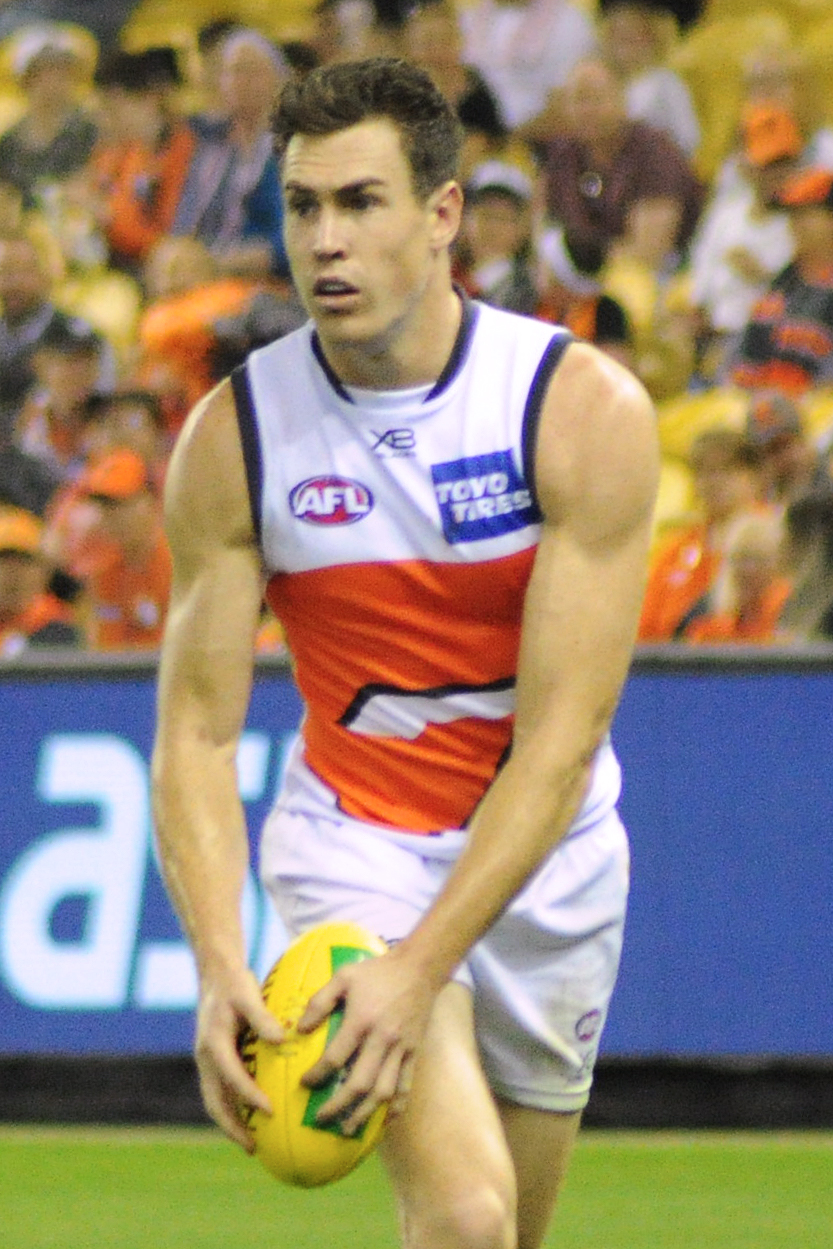
Cameron played 171 matches with Greater Western Sydney

In the 2013 AFL Season, Cameron continued to show his potential in a young GWS side, his game was already being likened to that of AFL Legends Matthew Lloyd and Jonathan Brown in only his second season. He received a Goal of the Year nomination for an excellent goal he kicked against Geelong in Round 11, one of four he kicked for the match. In Round 18 against Collingwood, Cameron kicked seven goals in the first three quarters. He finished the season by averaging 3.0 goals a game and ranked third in the Coleman Medal tally with 62 goals for the season, 6 goals behind winner, Jarryd Roughead. Cameron's excellent season resulted in him being named full-forward in the 2013 All-Australian team. He was the first Giants player to ever be named an All-Australian.

In the 2014 AFL Season, Cameron continued to show signs of being one of the most promising Centre Half Forwards in the game, for his age. He continued to show improvement, kicking his 100th AFL goal against the Western Bulldogs in round 4, one of three that he kicked during the game. Unfortunately for Cameron, injuries prevented him from replicating his previous dominate season. A perforated eardrum proved a hindrance, but repeated ankle problems were the real issue, limiting him to 14 games. He still topped the GWS goal-kicking for a third consecutive season with 29 goals on an avg of 2.1 goals a game. Cameron played his 50th AFL game against Fremantle in round 17, recording 2 goals in a 76-point loss.

In the 2015 AFL Season, Cameron returned to his previous career-best form, playing in every single game of the AFL home-and-away season. He kicked the season off by booting 4 goals in GWS's round 1 clash with St Kilda, following that up by kicking another 4 goals in a round 4 victory against the Gold Coast Suns. Cameron would then kick a mammoth 7 goals in round 6, as the Giants defeated two-time reigning premiers Hawthorn by 10 points. Cameron was again, proving himself to be not only the team's most lethal forward, but one of the most lethal forwards in the competition, finishing the season as the runner-up for the Coleman Medal with 63 goals, one more than his 2013 All-Australian Season. Cameron was named in the initial 2015 40-man All-Australian Squad, but missed out on making the final team. Cameron's tag as the GIANTS' 'franchise player' was consolidated when he signed a contract extension before the 2015 season that will keep him at the club until at least the end of the 2020 season.

==== 2016–2018: Individual success and consecutive finals appearances ====
Cameron received his first-ever suspension after a high hit on Brisbane player Rhys Mathieson during the 2016 NAB Challenge, resulting in Cameron being suspended for the first four games of the 2016 AFL Season. Cameron returned from suspension in round 5, recording 5 goals against St Kilda, he continued this form throughout the season, kicking four or more goals on six occasions. He would play in every remaining game of the home-and-away season following his round 5 return, finishing the season as GWS's leading goal-kicker for the 5th consecutive year with 53 goals, third place in the Coleman Medal. Cameron played a huge role in helping GWS reach their first ever finals series, finishing the season with a 16–6 win–loss record, resulting in them finishing 4th on the ladder. Cameron kicked 4 goals in the Giants first ever final, helping them defeat Sydney by 36 points in a qualifying final.

Cameron took leaps towards improving his game during the 2017 AFL Season by turning himself into a free-wheeling forward, giving himself the freedom to roam all over the ground, resulting in him increasing his disposal average from 9.5 to 15.8, his average marks a game from 4.3 to 7.1, and his average kicks a game from 7.2 to 10.9. Cameron started the season in tremendous form, recording 13 goals in the first three games, 4 in round 1 against the Adelaide Crows, 6 in round 2 against the Gold Coast Suns, and 3 in round 3 against North Melbourne. Cameron was on track to having a career-best haul when he had 39 goals after round 14, but hamstring issues cut his impact significantly. Cameron missed four of the last seven games of the regular season, resulting in him finishing the season with 45 goals. Cameron's impact again helped the Giants have a successful season, finishing 4th placed again with a win–loss record of 14–2–6. Cameron played in the first qualifying final against the Adelaide Crows, but again went down with a hamstring injury and was ruled out for the remainder of the finals series.

Cameron started the 2018 AFL Season almost identical to his previous season with 12 goals in the first three rounds, and 35 goals after round 14, but again his season was derailed, only this time it wasn't due to an injury. Cameron was suspended for five games due to a hit on Brisbane player Harris Andrews that resulted in bleeding on the brain and a severe concussion for Andrews. He returned in round 20, but only kicked 11 goals in his next six games, including only 3 goals during the Giants two finals games. Cameron ended his season with 46 goals.

==== 2019–2020: Grand final appearance and Coleman Medal ====
Cameron had a tremendous 2019 AFL season, breaking all new career-highs for goals per game (3.3), kicks per game (11.7), marks per game (6.5), and disposals per game (16.2) along with recording a career-high 67 goals, 372 disposals, 150 marks, and 269 kicks. Cameron played the most home-and-away games he has played since 2016 (20), only missing two games. In the final round of the home-and away season, round 23, Cameron was behind in the Coleman Medal tally by 6 goals, sitting at 58 while leader Ben Brown was at 64, but Cameron was able to boot a career-high 9 goals against the Gold Coast Suns to end his season with 67 goals and capture his first Coleman Medal, also becoming the first-ever GWS player to win the award, Cameron was also selected into his second All-Australian Team as full-forward. Topping off a tremendous individual season for Cameron, the Giants made the finals for the fourth consecutive year, finishing 6th on the ladder. Cameron carried his strong form into finals, booting 2 goals in an elimination final victory over the Western Bulldogs and 3 goals the following week in a semi-final victory over the Brisbane Lions. Cameron continued to be a force for the Giants when he kicked another 3 goals against Collingwood in a preliminary final, helping GWS reach their first-ever Grand Final in club history. Cameron kicked the first (and his only) goal of the 2019 AFL Grand Final in a disappointing 89-point loss to Richmond.

During the 2020 season, it was revealed that Cameron was the most highly paid player in the AFL contracted with a back-ended deal for roughly $1.5 million for 2020 (which was later reduced to $1.1 million per year due to the COVID-19 pandemic).

=== Geelong (2021–present) ===
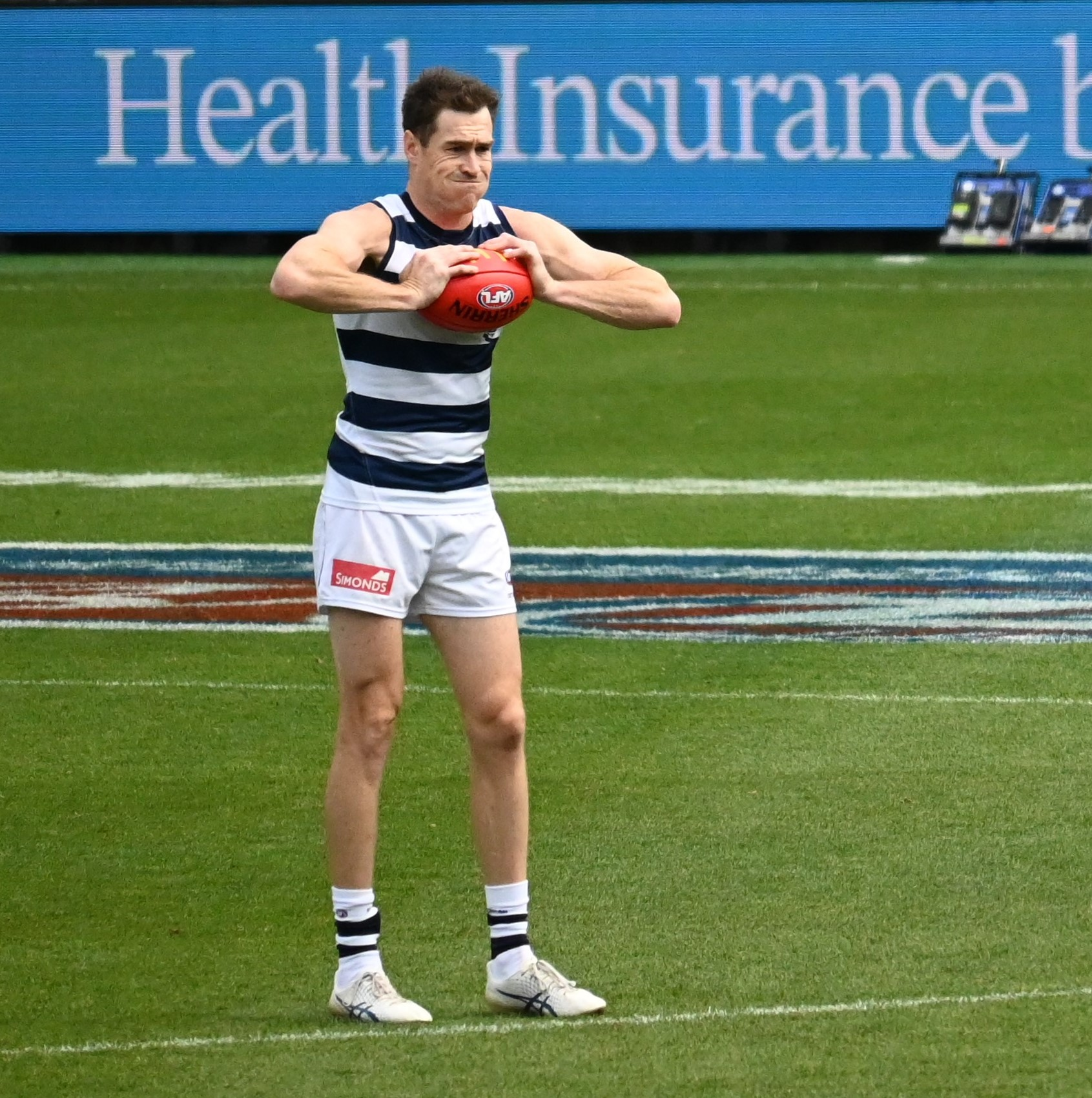
Cameron squeezing the ends of the football as part of his goal kicking routine.

==== Premiership medal and second Coleman medal (2021–2025) ====
Following the 2020 AFL season, Cameron decided to exercise his rights as a free agent and accept an offer from Geelong, which was matched by the Giants. This came following the stresses on players from the 2020 hubs and lockdowns, with Cameron on record as saying “The hub hurt me in a lot of ways – it was tough to be locked down, I really hated sitting in a hotel. I got myself in that headspace where I really battled. I probably should’ve spoken to the club about it earlier.”. The Giants traded Cameron to Geelong on the final day of trade period in exchange for three first-round draft picks.

After an injury-interrupted 2021 AFL season, his first at Geelong, many regard Cameron's 2022 campaign hitherto as a career-best year. A lack of injury concerns allowed Cameron to utilise his mobility to play up the ground as both a high half-forward and a key forward. His ability to roam through the midfield as a tall forward made him a dangerous and unique player. AFL champion David King remarked that in 2022, he was "clearly" the best player in the competition. He was awarded his third All-Australian selection in the 2022 All-Australian team, came equal third in the Coleman Medal, and received his first Carji Greeves Medal – his second ever best & fairest award. He won his first ever premiership, and polled a career-high 19 votes in the 2022 Brownlow Medal to come eighth.

After a slow start to his 2025 campaign, Cameron kicked 49 goals in 10 games, including 11 against North Melbourne. This sparked talks of the possibility of a 100 goal season from Cameron. However, his form slowed as he ended the home and away season with 83 goals, enough to secure his second Coleman Medal. When he was selected in the 2025 All-Australian team, it became the first time that Cameron was selected as an All-Australian in consecutive seasons. He was also named captain of the team, although he admitted that he'd never been named as captain of anything before. He featured in the Grand Final for the third time in his career, but was injured in the second quarter. Cameron returned to the field in the third quarter, but was unable to impact as Geelong went down to the Brisbane Lions by 47 points.

==== Late career (2026–present) ====
Cameron kicked ten goals against the Bulldogs in round six, 2026, helping his side to a huge 75-point win. Following his historic bag of ten, Cameron fell into a slump of form. After just four disposals and zero goals in round 17 against the Brisbane Lions, Cameron described his own performance as "borderline pathetic". Cameron suffered a severe shoulder injury against Greater Western Sydney the following week, placing heavy doubt over his season. Cameron made his return to the AFL against Richmond in Round 24, collecting 22 disposals. Cameron had a quiet game the following week in the Elimination Final win over Carlton, but had an impact the week after, collecting 14 disposals and 2 important goals in the eventual 14-point Semi Final loss to Fremantle.

== Personal life ==
Cameron grew up supporting Collingwood. He announced the birth of his first child in April 2023.

== Statistics ==
Updated to the end of round 22, 2026.

Legend
G	Goals	K	Kicks	D	Disposals	T	Tackles
B	Behinds	H	Handballs	M	Marks
#	Played in that season's premiership team	†	Led the league for the season

Season	Team	No.	Games	Totals							Averages (per game)							Votes
Season	Team	No.	Games	G	B	K	H	D	M	T	G	B	K	H	D	M	T	Votes
2012	Greater Western Sydney	18	16	29	15	115	45	160	80	28	1.8	0.9	7.2	2.8	10.0	5.0	1.8	0
2013	Greater Western Sydney	18	21	62	27	170	54	224	106	27	3.0	1.3	8.1	2.6	10.7	5.0	1.3	6
2014	Greater Western Sydney	18	14	29	21	105	28	133	60	18	2.1	1.5	7.5	2.0	9.5	4.3	1.3	0
2015	Greater Western Sydney	18	22	63	37	185	50	235	122	37	2.9	1.7	8.4	2.3	10.7	5.5	1.7	12
2016	Greater Western Sydney	18	20	53	25	143	82	225	72	39	2.7	1.3	7.2	4.1	11.3	3.6	2.0	4
2017	Greater Western Sydney	18	19	45	25	207	95	302	134	39	2.4	1.3	10.9	5.0	15.9	7.1	2.1	5
2018	Greater Western Sydney	18	18	46	32	202	72	274	111	24	2.6	1.8	11.2	4.0	15.2	6.2	1.3	6
2019	Greater Western Sydney	18	24	76^{†}	50	280	105	385	157	33	3.2^{†}	2.1	11.7	4.4	16.0	6.5	1.4	13
2020 (Note: The 2020 season was played with 17 home-and-away matches per team (down from 22) and 16-minute quarters with time on (down from 20-minute quarters with time on) due to the impact of the COVID-19 pandemic.)	Greater Western Sydney	18	17	24	13	121	55	176	67	24	1.4	0.8	7.1	3.2	10.4	3.9	1.4	3
2021	Geelong	5	15	39	16	118	57	175	57	16	2.6	1.1	7.9	3.8	11.7	3.8	1.1	6
2022^{#}	Geelong	5	24	65	37	272	116	388	141	34	2.7	1.5	11.3	4.8	16.2	5.9	1.4	19
2023	Geelong	5	20	53	34	255	66	321	114	27	2.7	1.7	12.8	3.3	16.1	5.7	1.4	13
2024	Geelong	5	24	64	41	278	114	392	144	40	2.7	1.7	11.6	4.8	16.3	6.0	1.7	16
2025	Geelong	5	26	88^{†}	43^{†}	288	64	352	152	46	3.4^{†}	1.7	11.1	2.5	13.5	5.8	1.8	20
2026	Geelong	5	19	41	29	211	61	272	113	20	2.4	1.8	11.3	2.9	14.2	6.6	1.1	4
Career			299	777	445	2950	1064	4014	1630	452	2.6	1.5	9.9	3.6	13.4	5.5	1.5	127

== Honours and achievements ==
Team

- AFL premiership player (Geelong): 2022
- McClelland Trophy (Geelong): 2022

Individual

- 5× All-Australian team: 2013, 2019, 2022, 2024, 2025
- 2× Coleman Medal: 2019, 2025
- Kevin Sheedy Medal: 2013
- Carji Greeves Medal: 2022
- 9× Greater Western Sydney leading goalkicker: 2012, 2013, 2014, 2015, 2016, 2017, 2018, 2019, 2020
- 3× Geelong leading goalkicker: 2023, 2024, 2025
- AFLPA best first year player: 2012
- AFLCA best young player of the year: 2013
- 2× 22under22 team: 2013, 2015
- AFL Rising Star nominee: 2012
