= 2013 All-Australian team =

Australian football team

The 2013 All-Australian team represents the best performed Australian Football League (AFL) players during the 2013 season. It was announced on 16 September as a complete Australian rules football team of 22 players. The team is honorary and does not play any games.

== Selection panel ==
The selection panel for the 2013 All-Australian team consisted of chairman Andrew Demetriou, Mark Evans, Kevin Bartlett, Luke Darcy, Danny Frawley, Glen Jakovich, Mark Ricciuto and Cameron Ling.

== Team ==
=== Initial squad ===
At the conclusion of the 2013 AFL home and away season, a provisional squad of 40 players was chosen. The most controversial omissions were Tom Liberatore, who led the league for clearances, Steve Johnson and Pearce Hanley, as well as no selections from finalists Richmond or Carlton. 25 players in the squad had not previously been selected in an All-Australian team.

Club	Total	Player(s)
Adelaide	2	Patrick Dangerfield, Richard Douglas
Brisbane Lions	0	
Carlton	0	
Collingwood	3	Travis Cloke, Scott Pendlebury, Dane Swan
Essendon	1	Jobe Watson
Fremantle	5	Nathan Fyfe, Michael Johnson, Chris Mayne, David Mundy, Michael Walters
Geelong	5	Corey Enright, Andrew Mackie, Steven Motlop, Joel Selwood, Harry Taylor
Gold Coast	1	Gary Ablett Jr.
Greater Western Sydney	1	Jeremy Cameron
Hawthorn	5	Lance Franklin, Josh Gibson, Luke Hodge, Sam Mitchell, Jarryd Roughead
Melbourne	0	
North Melbourne	4	Todd Goldstein, Lindsay Thomas, Scott Thompson, Daniel Wells
Port Adelaide	2	Travis Boak, Chad Wingard
Richmond	0	
St Kilda	2	Nick Riewoldt, Jack Steven
Sydney	5	Dan Hannebery, Kieren Jack, Josh Kennedy, Jarrad McVeigh, Nick Malceski
West Coast	2	Josh Kennedy, Eric Mackenzie
Western Bulldogs	2	Ryan Griffen, Will Minson

=== Final team ===
Geelong had the most selections, with four players. Geelong captain Joel Selwood was announced as the All-Australian captain and Gold Coast star Gary Ablett Jr. was announced as vice-captain.

2013 All-Australian team
B:	Corey Enright (Geelong)	Scott Thompson (North Melbourne)	Michael Johnson (Fremantle)
HB:	Jarrad McVeigh (Sydney)	Harry Taylor (Geelong)	Sam Mitchell (Hawthorn)
C:	Ryan Griffen (Western Bulldogs)	Joel Selwood (Geelong) (captain)	Scott Pendlebury (Collingwood)
HF:	Patrick Dangerfield (Adelaide)	Travis Cloke (Collingwood)	Kieren Jack (Sydney)
F:	Jarryd Roughead (Hawthorn)	Jeremy Cameron (Greater Western Sydney)	Chad Wingard (Port Adelaide)
Foll:	Will Minson (Western Bulldogs)	Dane Swan (Collingwood)	Gary Ablett Jr. (Gold Coast) (vice-captain)
Int:	Travis Boak (Port Adelaide)	Dan Hannebery (Sydney)	Jobe Watson (Essendon)
Int:	Andrew Mackie (Geelong)		
Coach:	Alastair Clarkson (Hawthorn)		

Note: the position of coach in the All-Australian team is traditionally awarded to the coach of the premiership team.
