= 2009 International Rules Series =

The 2009 International Rules Series (officially the 2009 Coca-Cola International Rules Series) was to have been the 15th International Rules Series football competition.

On 28 July 2009 the Australian Football League (AFL) informed the Gaelic Athletic Association (GAA) that due to economic conditions in Australia they would not be travelling to Ireland for the series in October. GAA President Christy Cooney and Ireland's international rules team manager Seán Boylan both expressed their disappointment at the AFL's decision. The AFL committed in writing that it would travel to Ireland for the series in 2010, and the Gaelic Grounds and Croke Park would host those two games.

== Postponed fixtures ==
- Australia: v London and v Clare (warm-up fixtures)
- Ireland: v Wicklow and v Tipperary (warm-up fixtures)
- First Test: 24 October 2009 at Gaelic Grounds, Limerick, County Limerick, Ireland
- Second Test: 1 November 2009 at Croke Park, Dublin, County Dublin, Ireland

== See also ==
- International rules football
- Gaelic football
- Australian rules football
- Comparison of Australian rules football and Gaelic football
