= Padraig O'Neill =

Irish Gaelic footballer

Personal information
- Born: Athy, County Kildare, Ireland

Sport
- Sport: Gaelic football
- Position: Centre-forward
Club
- Years: Club
- St Laurence's
Inter-county
- Years: County
- 2006–2015: Kildare
Inter-county titles
- Leinster titles: 0
- All Stars: 0

Padraig O'Neill is a Gaelic footballer from County Kildare. He plays for the Kildare senior inter-county football team and for his club St Laurence's.
