= Seán Powter =

Irish Gaelic footballer and hurler

Personal information
- Native name: Seán Potar (Irish)
- Born: 30 July 1997 (age 29) Cork, Ireland
- Occupation: Doctor
- Height: 5 ft 10 in (178 cm)

Sport
- Sport: Gaelic Football
- Position: Centre-forward
Club
- Years: Club
- Douglas
Club titles
- Cork titles: 0
College
- Years: College
- University College Cork
Inter-county*
| Years | County | Apps (scores) |
| 2016-present | Cork | 9 (1-02) |
Inter-county titles
- Munster titles: 0
- All-Irelands: 0
- NFL: 0
- All Stars: 0
- *Inter County team apps and scores correct as of 22:20, 18 November 2020.

Seán Powter (born 30 July 1997) is an Irish Gaelic footballer who plays as a centre-forward for the Cork senior team.

Born in Rochestown, County Cork, Powter was first introduced to Gaelic games in his youth. He developed his skills in both hurling and Gaelic football at St. Francis College while simultaneously enjoying championship success as a dual player at underage levels with Douglas.

Powter made his debut on the inter-county scene at the age of sixteen when he first linked up with the Cork minor teams as a dual player. After little success in these grades, he later won one Munster medal with the under-21 team. Powter made his senior debut during the 2016 championship.

== Career statistics ==
As of match played 8 November 2020.

| Team | Year | National League | | | Munster | | All-Ireland | | Total | |
| Team | Year | Division | Apps | Score | Apps | Score | Apps | Score | Apps | Score |
|---|---|---|---|---|---|---|---|---|---|---|
| Cork | 2016 | Division 1 | 0 | 0-00 | 1 | 0-00 | 3 | 0-01 | 4 | 0-01 |
| Cork | 2017 | Division 2 | 2 | 0-00 | 2 | 0-00 | 1 | 1-00 | 5 | 1-00 |
| Cork | 2018 | Division 2 | 1 | 0-01 | 0 | 0-00 | 0 | 0-00 | 1 | 0-01 |
| Cork | 2019 | Division 2 | 3 | 1-00 | 0 | 0-00 | 1 | 0-00 | 4 | 1-00 |
| Cork | 2020 | Division 3 | 5 | 0-01 | 1 | 0-01 | 0 | 0-00 | 6 | 0-02 |
| Cork | 2023 | Division 2 | 7 | 4-05 | 1 | 0-01 | 5 | 0-04 | 6 | 4-10 |
| Total | | | 11 | 1-02 | 4 | 0-01 | 5 | 1-01 | 20 | 2-04 |

== Honours ==
Douglas

- Cork Minor Football Championship (1): 2013
- Cork Minor Hurling Championship (1): 2015

Cork

- Munster Under-21 Football Championship (1): 2016

Sporting positions
| Preceded by Kevin Flahive | Cork Minor Football Captain; 2015 | Succeeded by Nathan Wall |
