= Dane Swan =

Australian rules footballer, born 1984

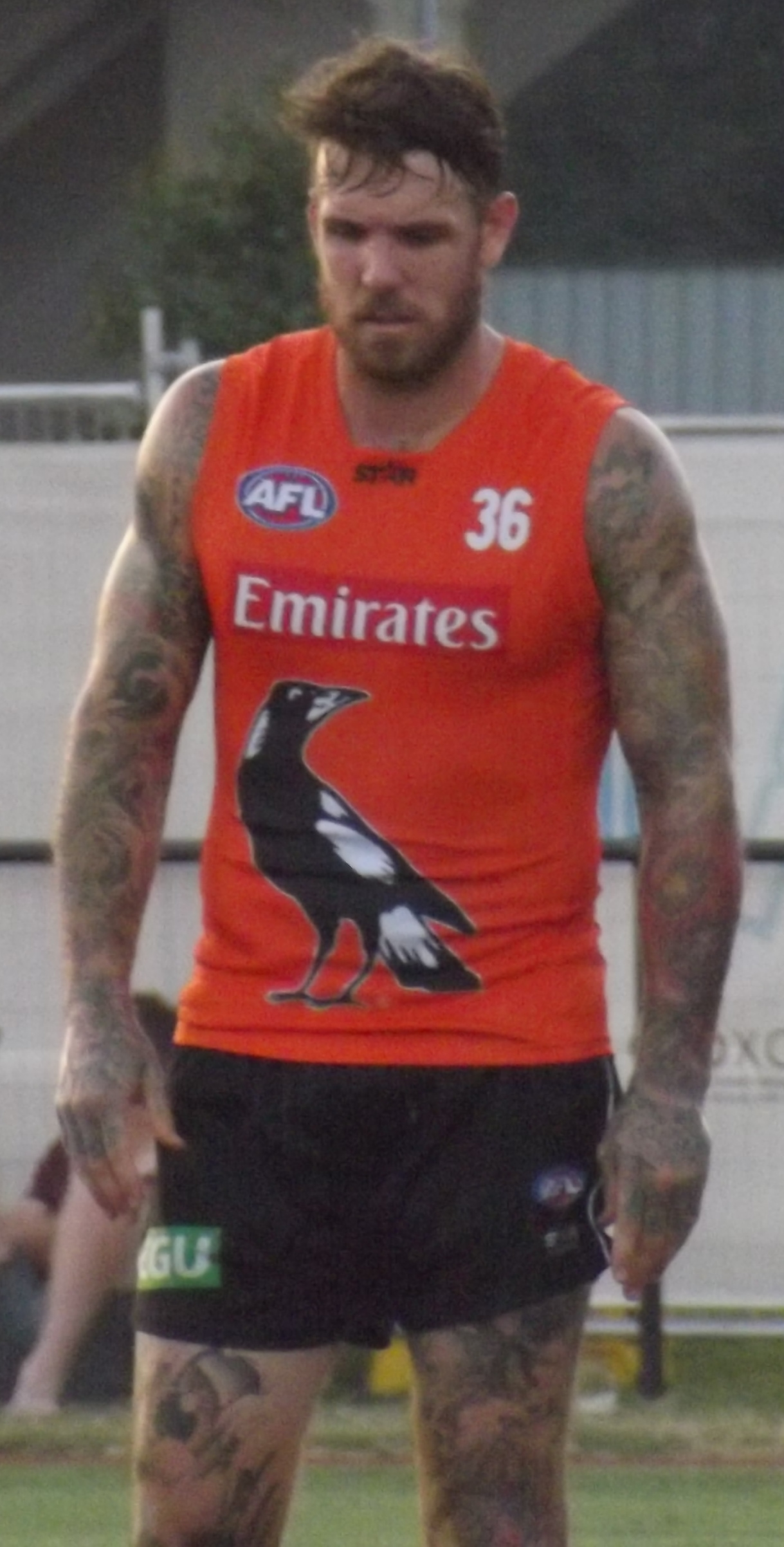
- Swan playing in a Collingwood intra-club match in 2015

Personal information
- Full name: Dane Swan
- Born: 25 February 1984 (age 42); Melbourne, Victoria, Australia
- Original team: Calder Cannons (TAC Cup)
- Draft: No. 58, 2001 national draft
- Height: 185 cm (6 ft 1 in)
- Weight: 93 kg (205 lb)
- Position: Midfielder

Playing career
Years	Club	Games (Goals)
2002–2016	Collingwood	258 (211)

International team honours
Years	Team	Games (Goals)
2010	Australia	2 (0)

Career highlights
- AFL: AFL premiership player: 2010; Brownlow Medal: 2011; Leigh Matthews Trophy: 2010; AFLCA Champion Player of the Year: 2010; 5× All-Australian Team: 2009, 2010, 2011, 2012, 2013; 2× AFL ANZAC Day Medal: 2012, 2014; 4× AFL Disposals Leader: 2009, 2010, 2011, 2013; Herald Sun Player of the Year: 2009, 2010; Lou Richards Medal: 2010; AFL Hall Of Fame : 2024; Collingwood: 3× Copeland Trophy: 2008, 2009, 2010; 3× R.T. Rush Trophy (2nd B&F): 2011, 2013, 2015; J.J. Joyce Trophy (3rd B&F): 2012; 3× Bob Rose Trophy (Best Finals Player): 2008, 2010, 2013; Collingwood Football Club Life Member: Collingwood Football Club Male VABer of the year 2011: VFL: Williamstown Premiership Player: 2003; Joseph Wren Memorial Trophy: 2003; Representative: Jim Stynes Medal: 2010

Dane Swan (born 25 February 1984) is a former professional Australian rules footballer who played for the Collingwood Football Club in the Australian Football League (AFL). Swan was drafted with pick 58 in the 2001 AFL draft, and made his debut in Round 13, 2003 against the Western Bulldogs.

Known as a prolific ball-winner, Swan averaged almost 27 disposals per game over his career. Swan was a premiership player, a Brownlow Medallist, a three-time Copeland Trophy recipient, a Leigh Matthews Trophy recipient, and a five-time All-Australian.

== Early life ==
Swan was born in Melbourne to Billy and Deidre Swan. He is a direct descendant of Thomas Flanagan, an Irish convict transported to Australia in 1849. His father Billy Swan was a highly decorated footballer in the VFA, winning the J. J. Liston Trophy twice and playing a competition record 302 games with Port Melbourne and Williamstown from 1976 to 1993.

He grew up playing junior football for the Westmeadows Football Club in the Essendon District Football League, and attended St. Bernard's College in Essendon before playing his under-18 football with the Calder Cannons in the TAC Cup.

Swan's performances at the Calder Cannons were ordinary and he was perceived by some recruiters to be a larrikin with questionable kicking accuracy and work ethic; however, Collingwood showed an interest in him as a potential late maturer in the mould of his father.

== Career ==
Swan was recruited by the Collingwood Football Club with pick 58 in the 2001 AFL draft. He made his debut in June 2003 at the age of 19, though he only played three games (against the Western Bulldogs, Richmond and Essendon). Swan managed just 30 games in his first four seasons in the system at Collingwood, and although he played some solid football in that time, he was not regarded as outstanding. He played much of this time with Williamstown, which was then Collingwood's VFL-affiliate, and he was a member of its 2003 premiership team.

In 2006, he broke through, playing 21 games and finished sixth in the Copeland Trophy voting. Swan mainly rotated through the midfield and moved forward when required. His first nine weeks were productive, averaging nearly 26 disposals and kicked 15 goals, before a hamstring injury suffered against Brisbane Lions in round ten sidelined him until round thirteen.

2007 was considered his breakout season as he placed fourth in the Copeland Trophy and was a surprise packet at the Brownlow, leading for most of the night before finishing sixth with 20 votes.

=== 2008 ===
The 2008 Copeland Trophy winner had a strong year averaging twenty-five disposals, seven marks, three tackles and one goal a game. Swan led the team in total disposals (590) and kicks (368), second in marks (163), and third in handballs (222) and tackles (75). He had 14 games of 25 possessions or more and kicked two or more goals on six occasions. Round 10 against West Coast was one of Swan's best, collecting 34 possessions, 10 marks and two goals. In round 14 against Sydney, he had 30 touches and 13 marks.

=== 2009 ===
In the 2009 season, Swan averaged 31.8 disposals, 7.8 marks, 3.0 tackles and 5.4 inside-50s per game. He was one of the AFL's most prolific ball winners, along with being an in-and-under specialist winning the contested ball at most stoppages whilst also running hard.

In Collingwood's 2009 round 10 clash against Port Adelaide, Swan obtained 48 possessions, 22 kicks and 26 handballs. This was the best disposal count in a decade and was then the third-highest-recorded disposals count in one match, behind Greg Williams' 53 and Tony Shaw's 50. It was a record since the length of game quarters was shortened from 25 minutes to 20 minutes in 1994, until surpassed in round 22, 2011 by Adelaide's Scott Thompson (51 disposals).

He was ranked third for total inside-50s, fourth in total goal assists, first in total kicks, fourteenth in total handballs, first in total disposals, tenth in total marks, fifth in inside-50s per game, thirteenth in goal assists per game, second in kicks per game, second in disposals per game. He was voted runner-up at the AFLPA MVP awards (polling 584 votes), finishing behind Gary Ablett (688). He was regarded as one of the front-runners for the Brownlow Medal, but finished outside the top ten.

Swan was selected in the 2009 All-Australian team, but controversially as a half forward flanker, rather than as a midfielder, which is his usual position.

=== 2010 ===
Swan averaged 31.8 disposals, including 19 kicks per game, totalling a then AFL record 820 disposals for the season. On 6 September, Swan won the AFL Players Association MVP Award (Leigh Matthews Trophy) after a vote by the players. That year he was also elected as the ruck-rover for the All-Australian team. His consistent season was a cornerstone to Collingwood's fifteenth premiership, to the point of having his tattoos referenced on the Herald Sun premiership poster. Swan finished third in the Brownlow Medal count, having started favourite. On 31 October in the International Rules Series he won the Jim Stynes Medal. At the conclusion of the season, Swan became only the fourth-ever Collingwood player to win three consecutive Copeland Trophies.

=== 2011 ===
With Swan's contract at Collingwood due to expire at the end of 2011, there was much pre-season media speculation over a possible move to new AFL club Greater Western Sydney. This was put to rest during the lead-up week to the season's commencement when Collingwood announced that Swan had signed a new three-year deal, committing him to the club until the end of 2014. Swan started 2011 in the same good form as 2010. He attained 40 disposals in round 2 against North Melbourne but sustained a quad injury close to the midway point of the season and his form deteriorated. Collingwood decided to send Swan, with teammates Brent Macaffer, Darren Jolly and Nathan Brown, to a high-altitude training camp in Arizona in an attempt to help the players recover faster from their individual injuries. The trip proved effective for Swan, with an immediate effect on his playing performances. In the next six games after his return, he had an average of 35.3 disposals per game with a strong effort against Essendon with 45 possessions and a goal. He later won the 2011 Brownlow Medal with 34 votes—setting a new record for the most votes polled in a count under the 3–2–1 system, which was later surpassed by Patrick Dangerfield in 2016.

=== 2012 ===
Swan received some criticism early on in the 2012 season and was accused of being unfit and "too fat". In the annual Anzac Day clash, Swan won his first Anzac Day medal as best on ground after a one-point win over Essendon, with forty-two possessions, three goals and six tackles during the game. Swan missed two games midway through the season due to a hamstring injury, then returned for the Queen's Birthday clash in Round 11 against Melbourne, where he finished with a game high 42 possessions. Strong performances over the following two months saw Swan rise in the Brownlow Medal betting, to become one of the favourites behind Jobe Watson, Scott Thompson and Gary Ablett. Swan was later found to have broken a pledge made by the playing group to abstain from drinking alcohol for the remainder of the season. He was suspended for two games as a result. Swan had over 40 disposals in six different games, reaching a new career high of 49 against Hawthorn in the round 17 loss, he also didn't have below 25 disposals. Swan over the home and away season averaged 35.7 disposals (career high and AFL record since stats were recorded) and 1.2 goals a game. Despite missing four home and away games Swan still finished fourth in the Brownlow Medal count and averaged more votes per game than anyone else in the top ten. He was named on the bench in the All-Australian team, his fourth selection in his career.

=== 2013 ===
Swan started the season averaging 30 possessions in the first three matches. In round 4, Swan played his 200th AFL game against an unbeaten Richmond, producing an almost best on ground performance (thirty-five disposals, six marks and one goal) and was only bettered by teammate Travis Cloke, who kicked a career best seven goals. At the end of the year Swan averaged 31.2 disposals, 5.7 marks, 3.4 tackles, and 5.2 inside-50s per game. He finished first in overall disposals, and equal seventh in total inside-50s. Swan was selected as the ruck-rover in the 2013 All-Australian team, the fifth consecutive year he was included. Swan finished third in the Brownlow Medal with 26 votes, losing by two to the winner Gary Ablett, and one to second-placed Joel Selwood.

=== 2014 ===
After wrist surgery in the off season, Swan started the season slowly, with an average of 22 disposals in the first three rounds, including just sixteen disposals in round 2. It didn't take long for him to find his form though, including thirty-five disposals and eleven marks against North Melbourne, and twenty-six disposals and four goals against Essendon to earn him his second ANZAC medal.

=== 2015 ===
After 2014, a year that Swan described as putrid, He returned to career-best form in 2015, averaging twenty-nine disposals and one goal per game, as well as reaching the 250-game milestone. Swan notched 30 disposals in 11 games during 2015, and played every game in 2015 apart from Collingwood's round 23 clash against Essendon due to a knee injury he sustained the week before. Although Collingwood missed the finals, Swan arguably proved to critics that at the age of 31 he is still able to play high-quality football at an elite level.

=== 2016 ===
In the round one clash against Sydney, Swan was badly injured after landing awkwardly on his foot, breaking three bones, including a Lisfranc. The injury ruled him out of the rest of the season, and in August he announced his immediate retirement from the AFL.

== Statistics ==
A prolific ball-winner, particularly in the latter part of his career, Swan lead the AFL in total disposals on four occasions and total kicks on five occasions. Swan accumulated an average of 26.85 disposals per game during his AFL career, which at the time of his retirement was the second-highest average of all time behind only Greg Williams (26.88 per game).

Legend
G	Goals	K	Kicks	D	Disposals	T	Tackles
B	Behinds	H	Handballs	M	Marks
#	Played in that season's premiership team	†	Led the league for the season	±	Won that season's Brownlow Medal

Season	Team	No.	Games	Totals							Averages (per game)							Votes
Season	Team	No.	Games	G	B	K	H	D	M	T	G	B	K	H	D	M	T	Votes
2002	Collingwood	36	0	—	—	—	—	—	—	—	—	—	—	—	—	—	—	0
2003	Collingwood	36	3	0	0	14	13	27	4	3	0.0	0.0	4.7	4.3	9.0	1.3	1.0	0
2004	Collingwood	36	13	2	5	105	66	171	49	18	0.2	0.4	8.1	5.1	13.2	3.8	1.4	0
2005	Collingwood	36	14	3	2	143	91	234	67	22	0.2	0.1	10.2	6.5	16.7	4.8	1.6	0
2006	Collingwood	36	21	19	12	311	176	487	168	44	0.9	0.6	14.8	8.4	23.2	8.0	2.1	11
2007	Collingwood	36	25	13	14	422	173	595	187	85	0.5	0.6	16.9	6.9	23.8	7.5	3.4	20
2008	Collingwood	36	24	22	23	368	222	590	163	75	0.9	1.0	15.3	9.3	24.6	6.8	3.1	12
2009	Collingwood	36	25	18	25	444^{†}	325	769^{†}	161	77	0.7	1.0	17.8	13.0	30.8	6.4	3.1	12
2010^{#}	Collingwood	36	26	24	23	505^{†}	315	820^{†}	146	123	0.9	0.9	19.4^{†}	12.1	31.5^{†}	5.6	4.7	24
2011	Collingwood	36	24	32	23	472^{†}	288	760^{†}	129	77	1.3	1.0	19.7^{†}	12.0	31.7^{†}	5.4	3.2	34^{±}
2012	Collingwood	36	21	25	22	442^{†}	283	725	138	71	1.2	1.0	21.0^{†}	13.5	34.5^{†}	6.6	3.4	25
2013	Collingwood	36	23	21	21	436^{†}	281	717^{†}	131	79	0.9	0.9	19.0^{†}	12.2	31.2	5.7	3.4	26
2014	Collingwood	36	17	11	12	244	180	424	79	49	0.6	0.7	14.4	10.6	24.9	4.6	2.9	17
2015	Collingwood	36	21	21	14	336	273	609	104	81	1.0	0.7	16.0	13.0	29.0	5.0	3.9	13
2016	Collingwood	36	1	0	0	0	0	0	0	0	0.0	0.0	0.0	0.0	0.0	0.0	0.0	0
Career			258	211	196	4242	2686	6928	1526	804	0.8	0.8	16.4	10.4	26.9	5.9	3.1	186

== Honours and achievements ==
- Team:
  - AFL Premiership (Collingwood): 2010
  - McClelland Trophy (Collingwood): 2010, 2011
  - NAB Cup (Collingwood): 2011
  - Robert Rose Cup: 2006, 2009, 2010, 2011, 2012, 2013
- Individual:
  - Brownlow Medal: 2011
  - Joseph Wren Memorial Trophy (VFL Best and Fairest): 2003
  - Copeland Trophy (Collingwood Best and Fairest): 2008, 2009, 2010
  - Leigh Matthews Trophy: 2010
  - All-Australian: 2009, 2010, 2011, 2012, 2013
  - Herald Sun Player of the Year: 2009, 2010
  - Australian Football Media Association Player of the Year: 2009, 2010
  - Bob Rose–Charlie Sutton Medal: 2009
  - AFLCA Champion Player of the Year: 2010
  - Lou Richards Medal: 2010
  - Australian Representative Honours in International rules football: 2010
  - Jim Stynes Medal: 2010
  - AFL ANZAC Medal: 2012, 2014
  - AFL Hall Of Fame: Inductee 2024

== Controversies ==
In 2003, Swan was arrested with two others following a brawl at Federation Square in which a security guard (Jesse James) was knocked unconscious, and another man (Claudio Celano) was left with a permanent brain injury. Swan was charged with 13 offences, including assault, affray and intentionally causing serious injury. Swan was convicted of affray and ordered to perform 100 hours of community service. Mr Celano, who suffered a permanent brain injury, sued his three assailants and in a settlement, Swan and the other offenders agreed to make payment of $100,000 to Mr Celano. However, in 2009 Mr Celano again sued Swan and the other offenders because they had failed to make payment as agreed and Swan was penalised for that failure to make payment. Mr Celano's lawyer noted that Swan and the other offenders had not made any apology to his client. In an interview in 2010, Swan detailed how close the incident came to ending his football career. Coach Mick Malthouse gave him a second chance, believing that Swan did not deserve to have his career derailed because of one stupid decision. In a further interview in 2017, Swan stated he had 'no regrets' about the incident which left one man unconscious and another with a permanent brain injury.

In March 2010, Swan hit a parked truck on the way from his house to training. Four months later, Swan was hit in the mouth at a nightclub.

In August 2012, Swan received an internal two-match suspension from the Collingwood senior team for breaking team rules—specifically, a pledge by the playing group to abstain from alcohol between late July and the end of the season.

In June 2014, Swan attended a fundraising event hosted by John Gatto, the brother of underworld figure Mick Gatto. Collingwood president Eddie McGuire had no problem with the incident.

In May 2018, explicit video footage of Swan was leaked, leading to a police investigation.

In January 2023, Swan tweeted about 'male tampons', causing controversy as they were actually absorbent underwear for incontinence.

== Personal life ==
Swan has been with his girlfriend, Taylor Wilson, since 2010. In November 2020 they announced that they were expecting a child. Their son, Tate, was born on 13 February 2021.
