= Sommet Sports =

- Country: New Zealand
- Broadcast area: New Zealand
- Headquarters: Auckland, New Zealand

Programming
- Picture format: 720×576i 16:9 (anamorphic)

History
- Launched: 18 July 2013
- Closed: 12 December 2014

Links
- Website: www.sommetsports.co.nz

Availability

Terrestrial
- DVB 64-QAM on band V

Sommet Sports was a sports-oriented television channel operated in New Zealand that was broadcast on channel 14 on Freeview NZ. It offered a varied range of sporting events, some of which had never been screened in New Zealand. This included live weekly coverage of the German Bundesliga, delayed Liverpool FC matches from the English Premier League and coverage of the former SKY-broadcast Moto GP.

Sommet Sports was officially launched on 18 July 2013 after delays, the original launch date for the channel was 18 April 2013. The channel is available to Freeview HD homes via an UHF aerial. Sommet Sports was later made available on the Freeview Satellite service as the old Prime location was vacated and added to the Sky channel line-up.

At 11 am on 12 December 2014, Sommet Sports released a statement saying they would cease transmission at midday the same day. The statement cites lack of promised funds as the reason why the channel closed down.

In January 2015 a crowdfunding proposal under the slogan "Sommet Strikes Back" was devised to get the station back up and running. It sought NZ$300,000 at the minimum. By mid-March only about NZ$50,000 was pledged and the project was declared unsuccessful.

== Sports coverage ==
Some sports broadcast by Sommet Sports included:

=== Australian rules football ===
- Australian Football League: 6 Games LIVE Per week plus 2 delayed games, Finals LIVE

=== Mixed martial arts ===
- World Series of Fighting

=== American football ===
- NFL

=== Football ===
- Bundesliga (LIVE coverage every week)
- DFB-Pokal
- UEFA Europa League
- Football League Championship
- Football League Cup
- England Home Internationals
- FA Community Shield
- LFC TV: Delayed Premier League match per week showing Liverpool fixtures
- ASB Premiership (Waitakere United home fixtures only)

=== Golf ===
- LPGA (featuring New Zealander Lydia Ko)
- The Evian Championship
- HSBC Women's Champions
- World Skins European Senior's Tour
- Great Golf Destinations: TV Show
- PowerPlay Golf
- Spirit of Golf: TV Show

=== Cricket ===
- Caribbean Premier League
- Sri Lanka tour to Bangladesh 2014
- 2014 Asia Cup

=== Cycling ===
- Giro d'Italia

=== Motorsports ===
- Moto GP
- 24 Hours of Le Mans
- Monster Jam
- Freestyle Motocross
- AMA Supercross Championship
- FIA European Championships for Rallycross Drivers
- 2013 FIA World Endurance Championship season
