= 1969 VFA season =

Division 1
- Teams: 10
- Premiers: Preston; 2nd D1 premiership
- Minor premiers: Preston; 2nd D1 minor premiership

Division 2
- Teams: 10
- Premiers: Williamstown; 1st D2 premiership
- Minor premiers: Sunshine; 2nd D2 minor premiership

The 1969 Victorian Football Association season was the 88th season of the top division of the Australian rules football competition, and the ninth season of second division competition. The Division 1 premiership was won for the second consecutive year by the Preston Football Club, after it defeated Dandenong in the Grand Final on 21 September by 12 points; it was Preston's second Division 1 premiership. The Division 2 premiership was won by Williamstown, in its second season since being relegated from Division 1.

== Clearance disputes ==
There had been open conflict on clearances between the Association and the Victorian Football League since the Association introduced transfer fees on its players in April 1967. League clubs were forbidden from paying transfer fees by the League's player payment rules (the "Coulter Laws"), and so the League terminated the 1949 clearance reciprocity agreement with the Association, allowing Association players to transfer directly to the League without a clearance, and vice versa, and it also had a ban on approving clearances to the Association in place during much of the dispute.

Despite the opportunity to transfer without a clearance, only three players had made this move to the League between 1967 and 1969: Terry Alexander, and future Hall of Fame players Kevin Sheedy and Peter Bedford – in no case was the transfer fee paid. All were suspended from the Association for five years, and the severity of this suspension is thought to have deterred others – particularly those who were not guaranteed to win a regular senior place in the League – from risking the move. The only player whose transfer fee was officially paid was 1967 Liston Trophy winner Jim Sullivan, who in 1968 attracted a $1,000 transfer fee to move to Claremont in the West Australian National Football League, a league which did not have the same payment restrictions as the VFL. On the other hand, more than sixty players from the VFL, mostly reserves and fringe senior players, made the cross to the Association without a clearance in the same time.

In November 1968, the Australian National Football Council intervened in an attempt to end the clearance dispute, by mandating that the two competitions were required to recognise the other's clearances; the ANFC had long-standing rules requiring reciprocal recognition of clearances between interstate competitions, but a loophole meant that these rules had not applied to two competitions within the same state.

In April 1969, the disagreement played out in the controversial case of Geoff Bryant. The Association approved the clearance of Bryant from Box Hill to the VFL's North Melbourne, and had set a transfer fee of $2,000 for Bryant's clearance. It was initially reported that the clearance had been approved without the transfer fee being paid, which could have occurred only if the Association had broken its own rules requiring the transfer fee. Association secretary Fred Hill responded to the press that this was not the case: that North Melbourne had indeed paid the transfer fee, and had done so secretly in defiance of the VFL's rules. Box Hill president Reg Shineberg described to the press the clandestine circumstances under which he had allegedly received the fee – in $10 and $20 notes, under cover of darkness outside VFA House, from a man he did not know. The VFL arbitrators investigated North Melbourne over the alleged breach of its payment rules, but the charges were dropped after the Association did not provide any written corroborating evidence to the investigation. Whether or not the illegal transfer fee was actually paid was never proven.

On 11 April 1969, while the Bryant case was ongoing, the Association Board of Management agreed by a 41–2 majority to drop its transfer fee rule; but, it did not reinstate a clearance reciprocity agreement, and in Round 1, two League players were permitted to play in the Association without a clearance: John Ibrahim (from North Melbourne, fielded by Sunshine) and Alan White (from St Kilda, fielded by Caulfield). The ANFC issued an ultimatum to the Association reinstate a clearance agreement with the League, but the Association refused, and yet more players crossed without a clearance (including Fred Cook, who went on to become the Association's all-time leading goalkicker); as a result, the Association was excluded from sending a team to the 1969 Interstate Carnival, which was held in Adelaide in June, and was then finally expelled altogether from the ANFC in March 1970 – ending its twenty-year affiliation with the national body which had started in August 1949.

== Division 1 ==
The Division 1 home-and-home season was played over 18 rounds; the top four then contested the finals under the Page–McIntyre system. The finals were held at the Punt Road Oval, in Richmond.

=== Ladder ===
1969 VFA Division 1 ladder
Pos	Team	Pld	W	L	D	PF	PA	PP	Pts
1	Preston (P)	18	17	1	0	2158	1407	153.4	68
2	Dandenong	18	14	4	0	2085	1784	116.9	56
3	Sandringham	18	13	5	0	1851	1684	109.9	52
4	Port Melbourne	18	11	7	0	1808	1526	118.5	44
5	Yarraville	18	9	9	0	1882	1760	106.9	36
6	Prahran	18	9	9	0	1793	1743	102.9	36
7	Waverley	18	6	12	0	1582	1743	90.8	36
8	Geelong West	18	5	13	0	1402	1907	73.5	20
9	Oakleigh	18	3	15	0	1395	1886	74.0	12
10	Brunswick	18	3	15	0	1357	1971	68.8	12

Rules for classification: 1) points; 2) percentage; 3) number of points for.
(P) Premiers

=== Finals ===
	Semi-finals
Sunday, 31 August	Sandringham 14.20 (104)	def. by	Port Melbourne 16.18 (114)	Punt Road Oval (crowd: 10,000)
Sunday, 7 September	Preston 10.18 (78)	def.	Dandenong 11.9 (75)	Punt Road Oval (crowd: 8,000)

	Preliminary Final
Sunday, 14 September	Dandenong 15.16 (106)	def.	Port Melbourne 13.15 (93)	Punt Road Oval (crowd: 6,000)

1969 VFA Division 1 Grand Final
Sunday, 21 September	Preston	def.	Dandenong	Punt Road Oval (crowd: 10,000)
5.5 (35); 7.9 (51); 9.11 (65); 12.11 (83)	Q1; Q2; Q3; Final	3.0 (18); 5.4 (34); 7.8 (50); 10.11 (71)	Umpires: Brewer
Joyce 3, Reid 2, Clark, Dalton, Dea, Heard, Leslie, McLean, Telford	Goals	Miller 7, Guinane, Sheehan, Stedwell

=== Awards ===
- The leading goalkicker for the second consecutive season was Jim Miller (Dandenong), who kicked 91 goals in the home-and-away season and 106 overall.
- The J. J. Liston Trophy was won by Laurie Hill (Preston), who polled 33 votes. Hill finished ahead of team-mate Bruce Reid, who finished second with 30 votes; Errol Hutchesson was third with 21 votes.
- Sandringham won the seconds premiership. Sandringham 22.9 (141) defeated Waverley 16.13 (109) in the Grand Final, played as a stand-alone match on Saturday 20 September at Skinner Reserve.

== Division 2 ==
The Division 2 home-and-home season was played over eighteen rounds; the top four then contested the finals under the Page–McIntyre system.

=== Ladder ===
1969 VFA Division 2 ladder
Pos	Team	Pld	W	L	D	PF	PA	PP	Pts
1	Sunshine	18	17	1	0	2362	1423	166.0	68
2	Coburg	18	16	2	0	2344	1445	162.2	64
3	Williamstown (P)	18	15	3	0	2017	1259	160.2	60
4	Box Hill	18	9	9	0	1667	1869	89.2	36
5	Northcote	18	8	9	1	1438	1633	88.1	34
6	Caulfield	18	8	10	0	1787	1830	97.7	32
7	Werribee	18	7	11	0	1702	1686	100.9	28
8	Frankston	18	5	13	0	1767	2055	86.0	20
9	Mordialloc	18	3	15	0	1425	2017	70.6	12
10	Camberwell	18	1	16	1	1178	2460	47.9	6

Rules for classification: 1) points; 2) percentage; 3) number of points for.
(P) Premiers

=== Finals ===
	Semi-finals
Sunday, 24 August	Williamstown 26.17 (173)	def.	Box Hill 7.11 (53)	Toorak Park (crowd: 6,000)
Sunday, 31 August	Sunshine 19.17 (131)	def.	Coburg 18.13 (121)	Toorak Park (crowd: 4,000)

	Preliminary Final
Sunday, 7 September	Coburg 8.5 (53)	def. by	Williamstown 14.12 (96)	Toorak Park (crowd: 4,200)

1969 VFA Division 2 Grand Final
Sunday, 14 September	Sunshine	def. by	Williamstown	Toorak Park (crowd: 6,000)
4.3 (27); 7.5 (47); 11.12 (78); 12.12 (84)	Q1; Q2; Q3; Final	2.2 (14); 8.8 (56); 10.9 (69); 15.14 (104)	Umpires: McMaster
Allen 4, Ibrahim 2, Bean, Dean, Goold, Kennedy, Greg Rosser, Russell	Goals	Jackman 4, Papley 3, Smith 3, Hayward, Lane, Mulligan, Page, Patterson
Darul, for striking Smith in the second quarter	Reports

=== Awards ===
- The leading goalkicker for Division 2 was George Allen (Sunshine), who kicked 89 goals in the home-and-away season, and 99 goals overall.
- The Division 2 Best and Fairest, which was now known as the J. Field Medal, was won by Jim Sullivan (Coburg), who polled 44 votes. Sullivan had won the Liston Trophy two years earlier, and was also a former winner of the Thirds Best & Fairest, making this Sullivan's third Association Best and Fairest award.
- Williamstown won the Seconds premiership. Williamstown 16.8 (104) defeated Sunshine 11.13 (79) in the Grand Final, held as a stand-alone match on Saturday 6 September at Skinner Reserve.
- Williamstown also won the Thirds premiership to become the first club to win the premiership in all three grades in one season.

== Notable events ==
- In the week leading up to the Division 2 Grand Final, Williamstown captain-coach Max Papley and team-mates Dallas Patterson and Bert Johnson were involved in a car accident. Papley suffered bruised ribs and Patterson suffered head lacerations, but both played in the Grand Final victory against Sunshine.

== See also ==
- List of VFA/VFL premiers
