= Scoring in Gaelic games =

This page discusses scoring in the Gaelic games of hurling, Gaelic football, camogie, ladies' Gaelic football, international rules football and shinty-hurling.

Note that although rounders and Gaelic handball are considered "Gaelic games", they are not listed under this page. Rounders uses a scoring system similar to baseball, and handball scoring is similar to squash.

== Scoring ==
Scoring system in gaelic games
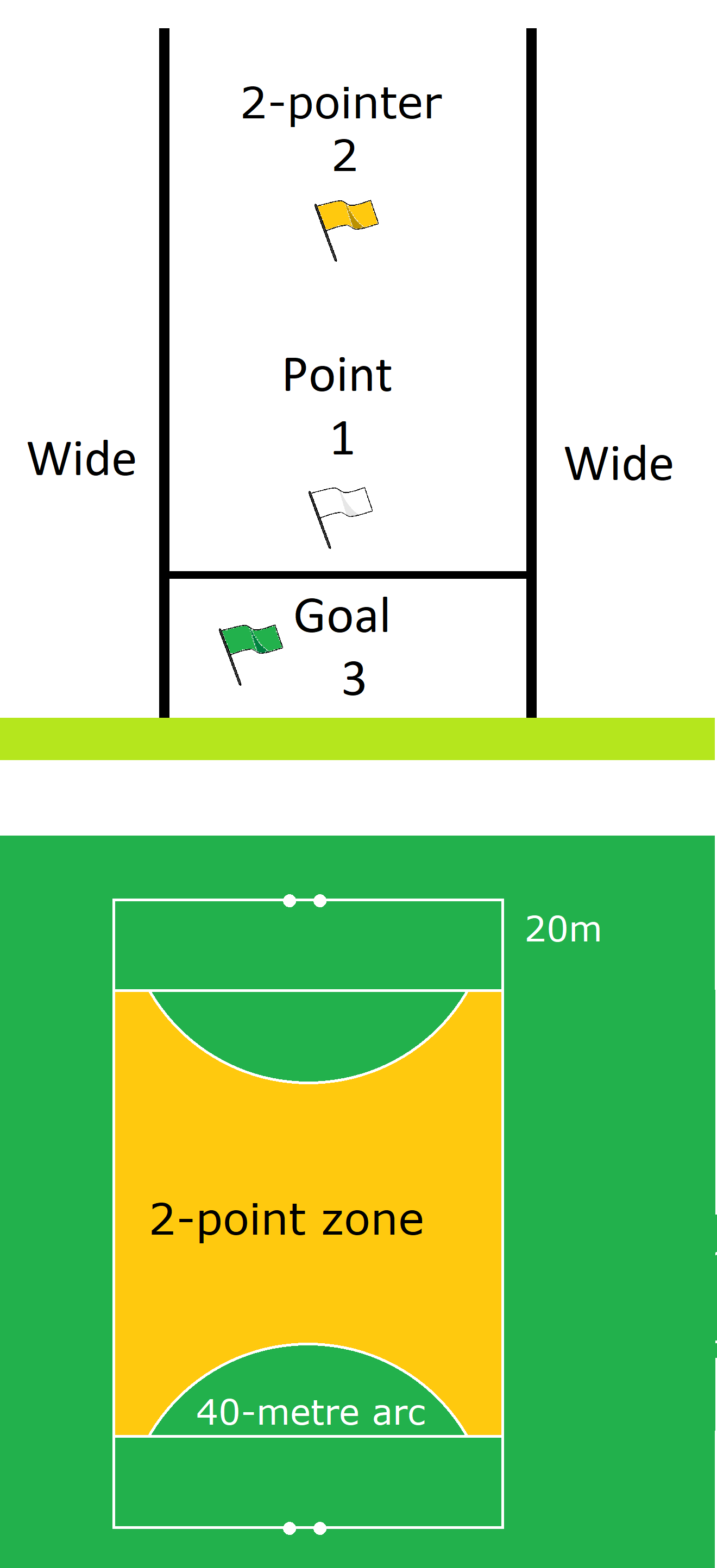
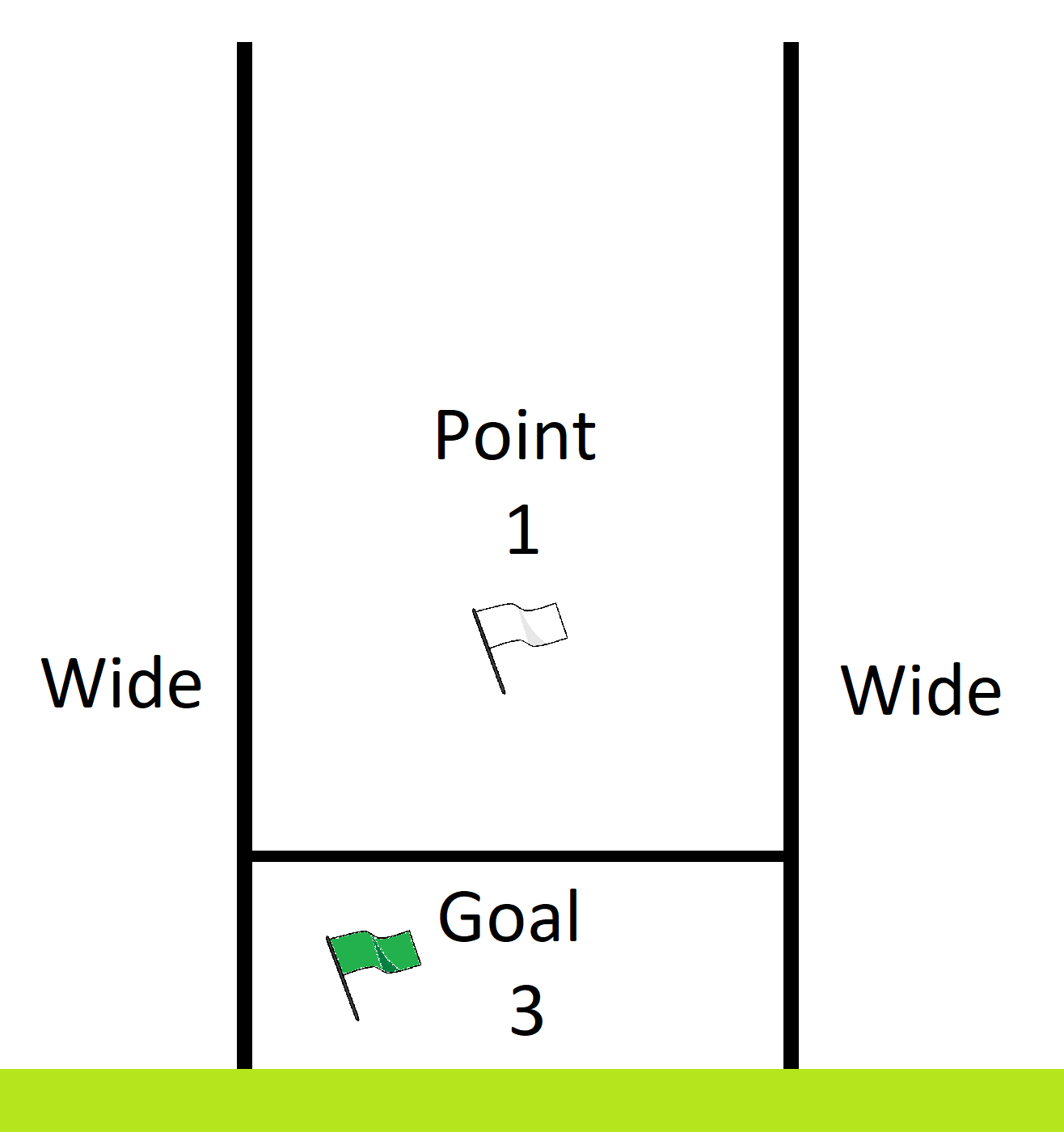
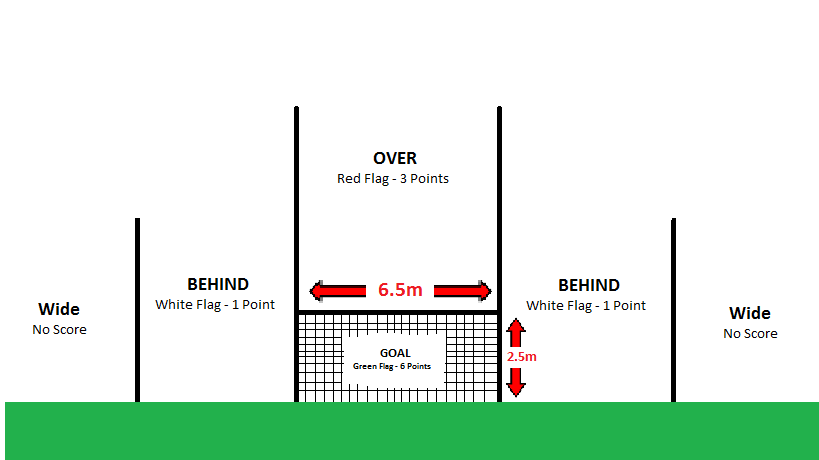
Top left: gaelic football. Top right: hurling, camogie, ladies' Gaelic football and shinty-hurling. Bottom: international rules football.

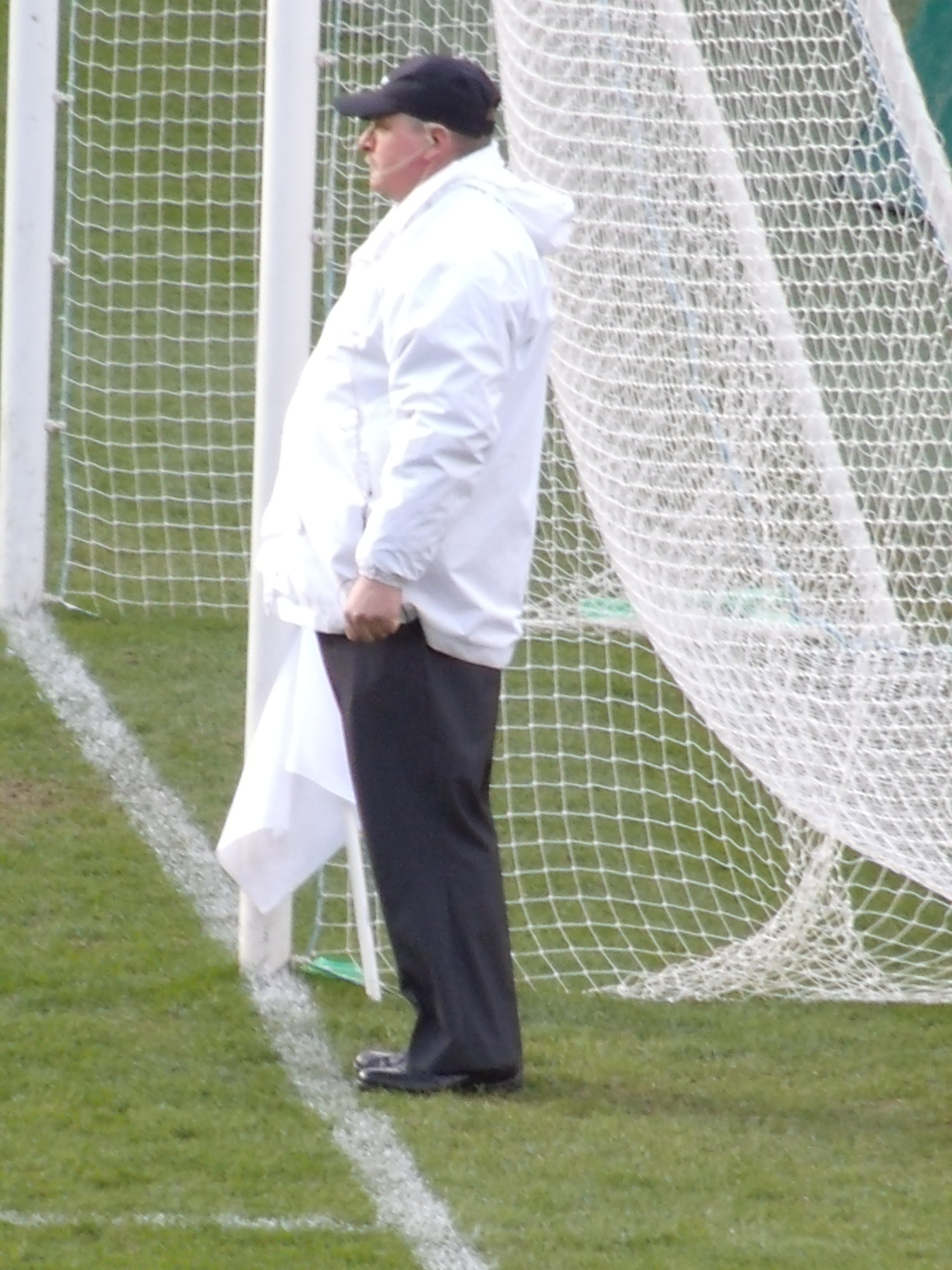
Umpire with white flag. The umpire with a green flag stands on the other side of the goals.

In hurling, Gaelic football, camogie, ladies' Gaelic football and shinty-hurling, the goalposts are placed 6.5 m (21 ft) apart and are at least 7 m (23 ft) tall, with a crossbar at a height of 2.5 m (8 ft 2 in). Playing the ball (a sliotar or Gaelic ball, depending on the game) between the posts and below the crossbar scores a goal (Irish: cúl), while playing the ball between the posts and above the crossbar scores a point (cúilín). A goal is worth 3 points. The umpire signifies a goal by waving a green flag, and a point by waving a white flag. Signal flags have been used since the 1900s; one game in the United States in 1907 used a US flag to signify points, and an Irish flag (presumably the tricolour) for a goal. The tradition of green flag for goal and white flag for point appears to date from the 1920s.

In international rules football there are further posts 6.5 m (21 ft) either side of the goalposts. Playing the ball between the goalposts and these side posts scores a behind. Playing the ball between the centre posts and below the crossbar scores a goal, while playing the ball between the posts and above the crossbar scores an over. A goal is worth 6 points, an over 3, and a behind 1.

=== Terminology ===
The Irish term for goal is cúl, cognate with Latin cūlus, "rear." "Point" is cúilín, a diminutive form.

== History ==
=== First GAA rules ===
The first Gaelic football and hurling rules were published by the fledgling Gaelic Athletic Association in 1885. These specified goalposts similar to soccer goals: for football 15 ft (4.6 m) wide and a crossbar 8 ft (2.4 m) high, while for hurling they were 20 ft (6.1 m) wide and a crossbar 10 ft (3.0 m) high. Goals were the only score possible; this led to a high number of scoreless draws.

In 1886, two poles were placed 21 ft (6.4 m) either side of the goals. A goal was scored when the ball was played into the goal; a point was scored when the ball was played above the crossbar, or wide of the goals between the two outer posts. When the ball was played wide of the outer posts, no score was recorded, unless it was played by a defender, in which case a forfeit point was awarded.

Whichever team scored more goals won the game; if teams were tied on goals, points were counted, and forfeit points were worth 1/5 of a point. The score was written in the format goals–points (forfeit points), e.g. Tipperary's score of 1-1 (1) in the 1887 All-Ireland Senior Hurling Championship Final. Forfeit points rarely made any difference, although one game in 1887 ended North Tipperary 0-0 (1), Holycross 0-0 (0).

=== Changes ===
Value of scores
Period	Goal	Two-pointer	Point	Forfeit point
1885	1	—N/a	—N/a	
1886–87	∞	—N/a	1	1/5
1888–91	∞	—N/a	1	—N/a
1892–95	5	—N/a	1	—N/a
1896–present	3	—N/a	1	—N/a
2005–present (certain competitions/codes)	3	2	1	—N/a

In 1888 the forfeit point was abolished, replaced by a 70 yd (64 m) puck in hurling and a 50 yd (46 m) kick in football. Hurling and Gaelic football goals were made the same size: 21 ft (6.4 m) by 8 ft (2.4 m). When the game converted to the metric system these were adjusted slightly to 65 and 45 metres respectively.

In 1892 the goal was changed to be worth five points.

In 1896 the goal was reduced to three points, and has held that value ever since.

In 1910 the side posts were removed, and the H-shaped goalposts introduced. Now, a point had to go over the crossbar.

Since 2012, a sideline cut has been worth two points in camogie.

Since 2020, a "45" has been worth two points in ladies' Gaelic Football if it goes straight over without a deflection; otherwise it is worth one point.

=== Modern experiments ===
In the 2005 National Hurling League two points were awarded for a point scored from a sideline cut in hurling, in recognition of the difficulty of this skill (typically only about one-fifth of such efforts are successful).

The idea of increasing the value of the goal to 4 points has come up repeatedly in recent years.

The 2024 Interprovincial Football Championship saw several experimental rules, including a goal being worth 4 points and 2 points being awarded for kicking the ball over the crossbar from outside a 40 m (44 yd) arc. Umpires waved a red flag to indicate the 2-pointer, similar to international rules football. Scores were written in the format "Connacht 4-5-11 (37), Leinster 1-2-7 (15)."

The new Football Review Committee (FRC) rule changes were adopted in 2024, including 2 points when the ball is kicked over the crossbar and between the posts from outside the 20-metre line and outside a 40-metre arc (whose centre is at the middle of the goal-line). An orange flag is waved for a 2-pointer instead of the red flag that was used previously; this means the three colours of the Irish flag are used.

== Frequency ==
An oft-repeated aphorism, especially with regard to Gaelic football, is "points win games" or "take your points and the goals will come." This has become especially true in recent decades: in the mid-1970s, games in the All-Ireland Senior Football Championship averaged 3.5 goals, but in the 2000s this had fallen to 1 goal per game. Martin Breheny observed "Improved fitness levels, more mobile defenders, and better defensive techniques have combined to seal off attackers' approach routes, making the goal an endangered species." Raising the value to 4 or even 5 points has been suggested.

In hurling, goals per game has decreased from a peak of 4.18 per game in 1983, in part because of a rule change that banned handpassed goals.

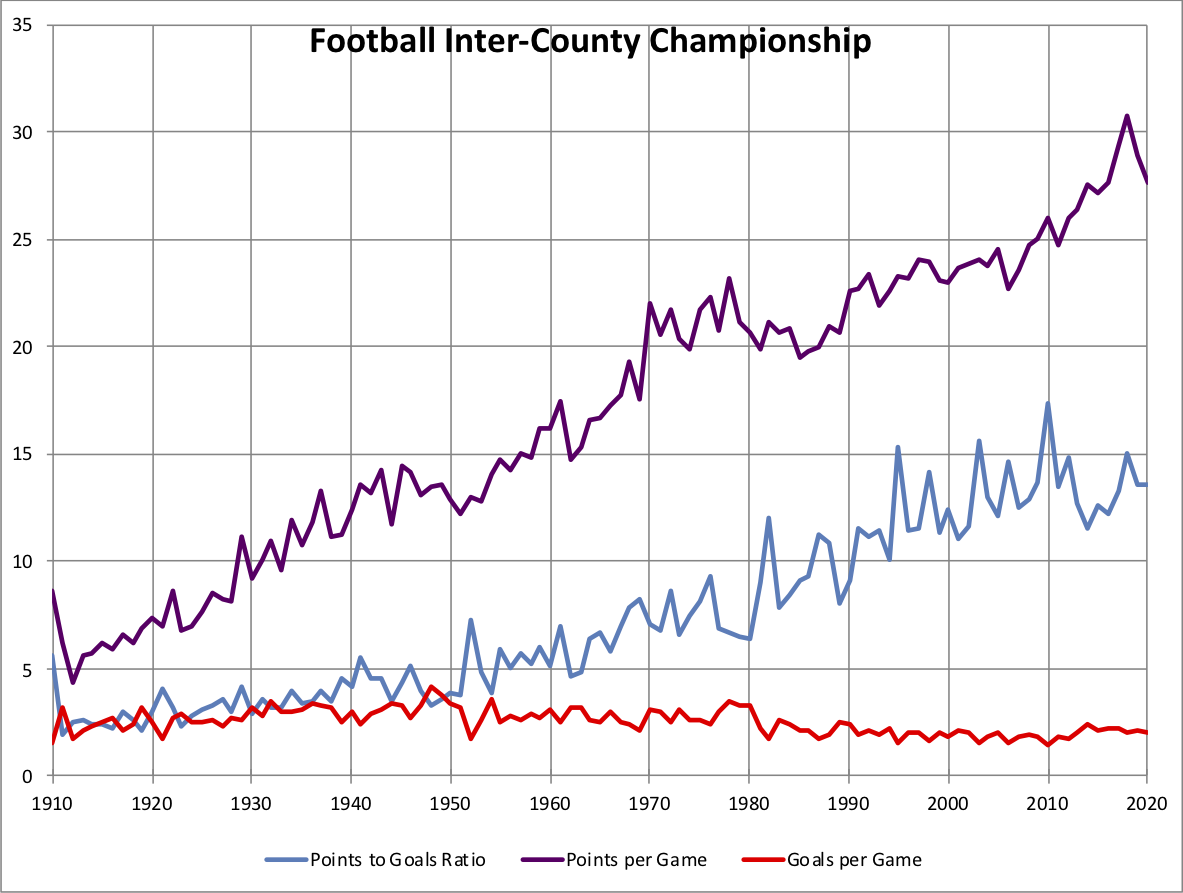
Gaelic Football Inter-County Championship Scoring 1910 to 2015

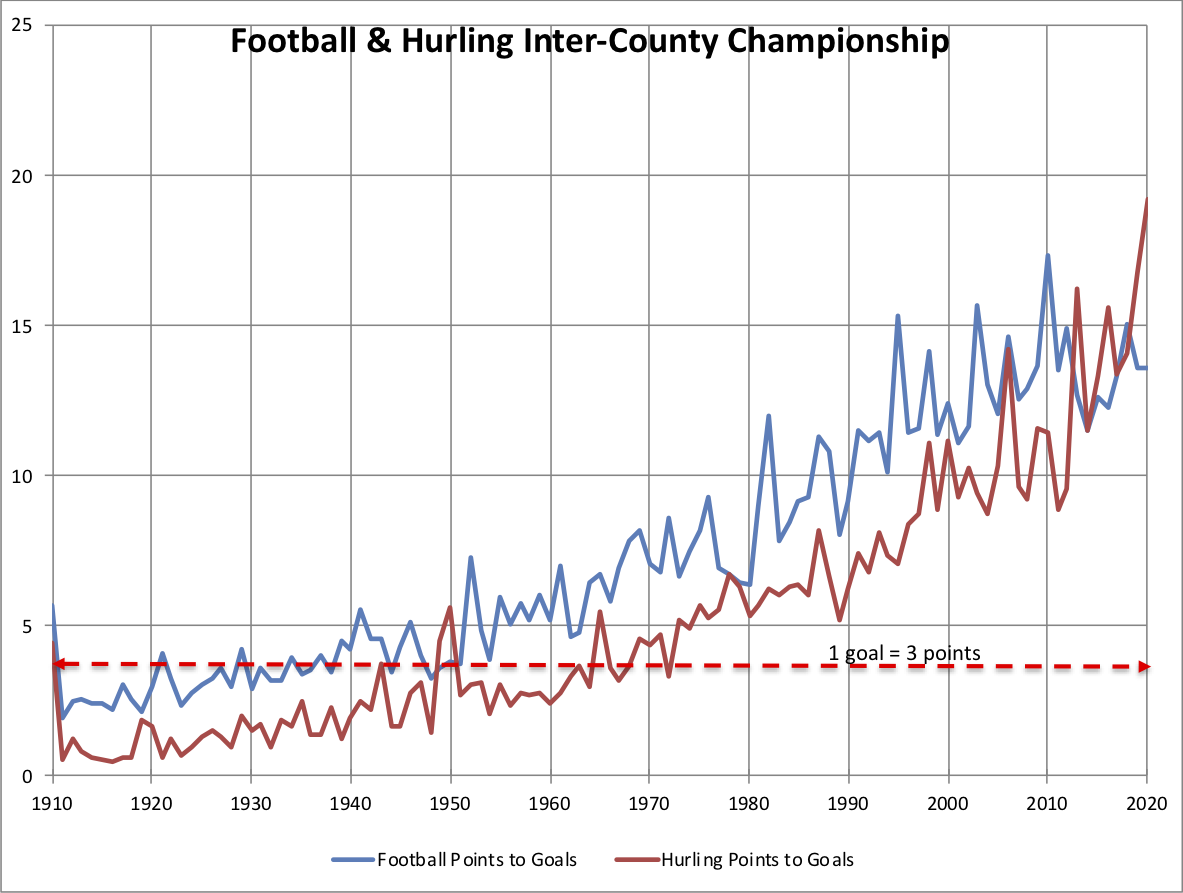
Graph of hurling and Gaelic football ratio of points to goals from 1910 to 2015

== Notation ==
A particular notation has been developed over the years by journalists and statisticians to record scoring in Gaelic games.

=== Score by team ===
A team's score is given in the form goals-points, separated by either a hyphen ( - ) or en dash ( – ), for example Cork 1-14 Kerry 2-10. The total points score may be given in brackets afterward for clarity: Cork 1-14 (17) Kerry 2-10 (16), but goals are never converted into points. Unlike other sports, where the home team's name is given before the away team, in Gaelic games the winning team's name is almost always given first.

Scores are spoken aloud thus:

- 0-20: "twenty points"
- 1-6: "one six"
- 3-17: "three seventeen"
- 2-0: "two goals"
- 0-0: "no score"

In international rules football, the score is given in the format goals.overs.points (total), for example the 2014 International Rules Series ended Australia 0.17.5 (56), Ireland 2.9.7 (46).

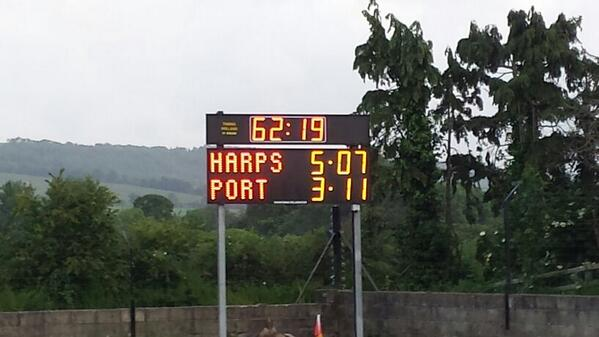
Scoreboard at a GAA match. Spectators are expected to calculate the total score themselves: Harps have scored 5 goals and 7 points (total 22), while Port have 3 goals and 11 points (total 20).

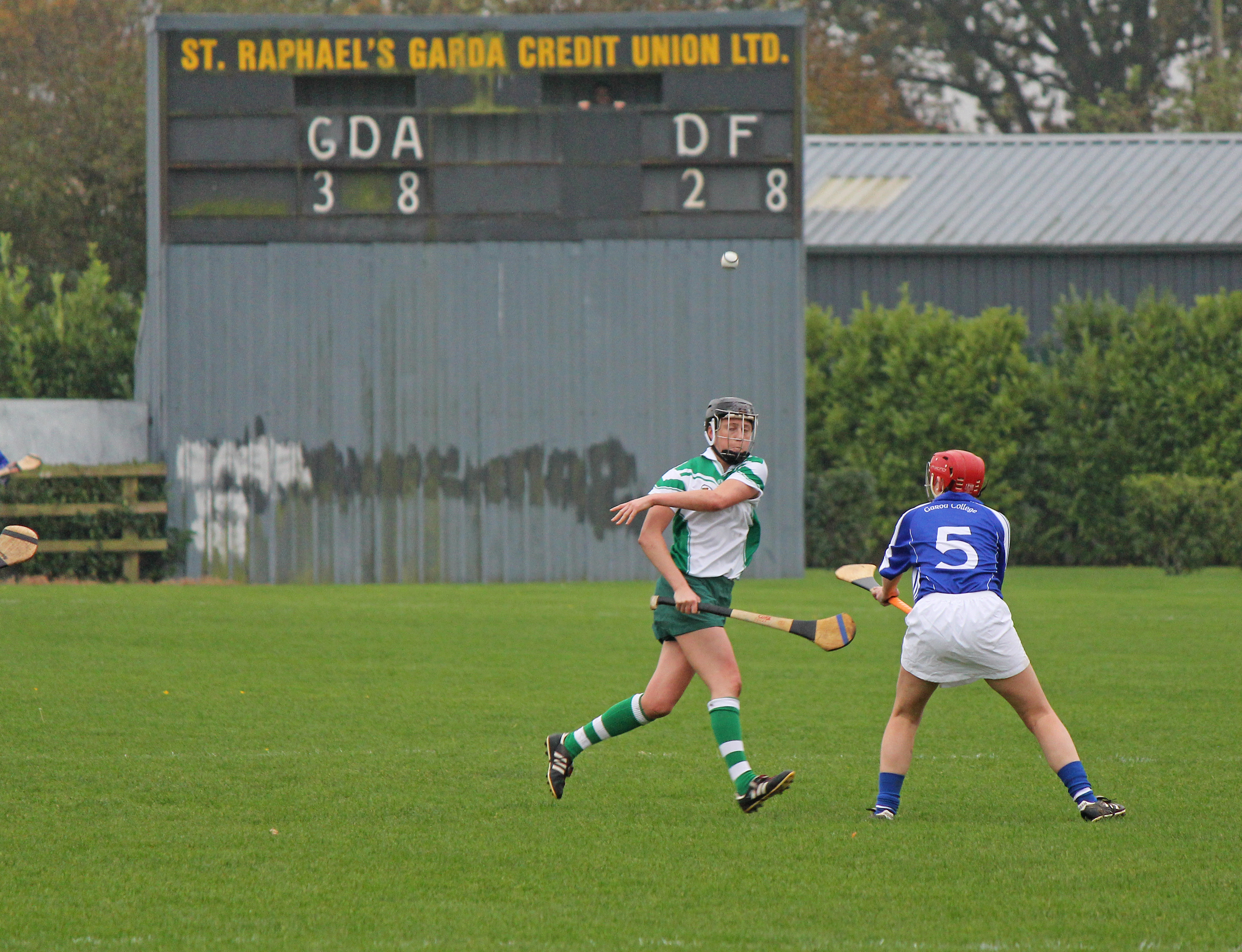
Scoreboard at a camogie game. The Garda Síochana team lead the Defence Forces by 3-8 to 2-8 (i.e., 17 to 14).

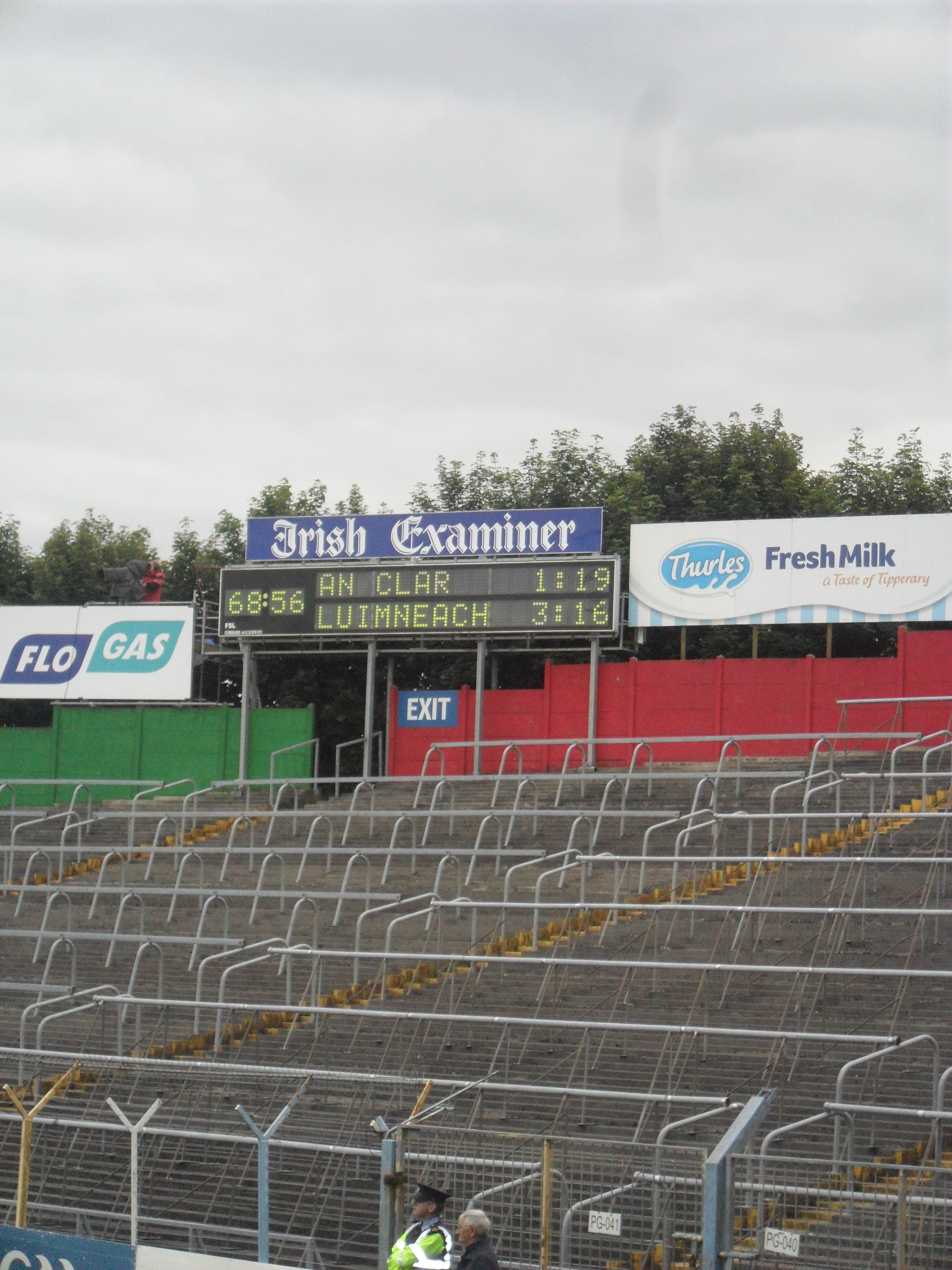
Scoreboard in Semple Stadium

=== Score by player ===
In newspaper and other written accounts of games, the score of each individual player is given in abbreviated format. First the total is given, and then it is broken down by dead ball scores.

- f or fs: free kicks / free pucks
- pen: penalty kicks / penalty pucks
- '45' or ‘45: 45-metre kick (awarded in Gaelic football and ladies Gaelic football when a defender plays the ball over his/her own end line, like a corner kick in soccer); a 45-metre puck is awarded in camogie
- '65' or ‘65: 65-metre puck (awarded in hurling when a defender plays the ball over his own end line)
- s/l or sl: sideline kicks / sideline pucks
- m or mk: scores from marks.
- tp: 2-pointers, according to the new Gaelic football rules. A two-point free is tpf, and a two-pointer from a mark is tpm.
- Scores from open play are not indicated; any scores not accounted for by dead ball are from open play by default.

So if a report says James Kelly 2-5 (1-1f, 1-0pen, 0-2 '45'), it means that he scored 2 goals and 5 points, of which a goal and a point were from frees, a goal from a penalty, two points from 45-metre kicks, and the other two points were from open play. If no goals are scored, the 0- will be omitted, e.g. Michael O'Shea 0-9 (5f, 1 '65', 1 sideline). If all scores were of one type, the brackets may be omitted, reading: Síle Harrington 0-5f (indicating five points, all of which were frees) or J. J. Maguire 1-0pen (one goal, a penalty) or sometimes Sarah Moore 0-4(fs).
