= 1970 VFA season =

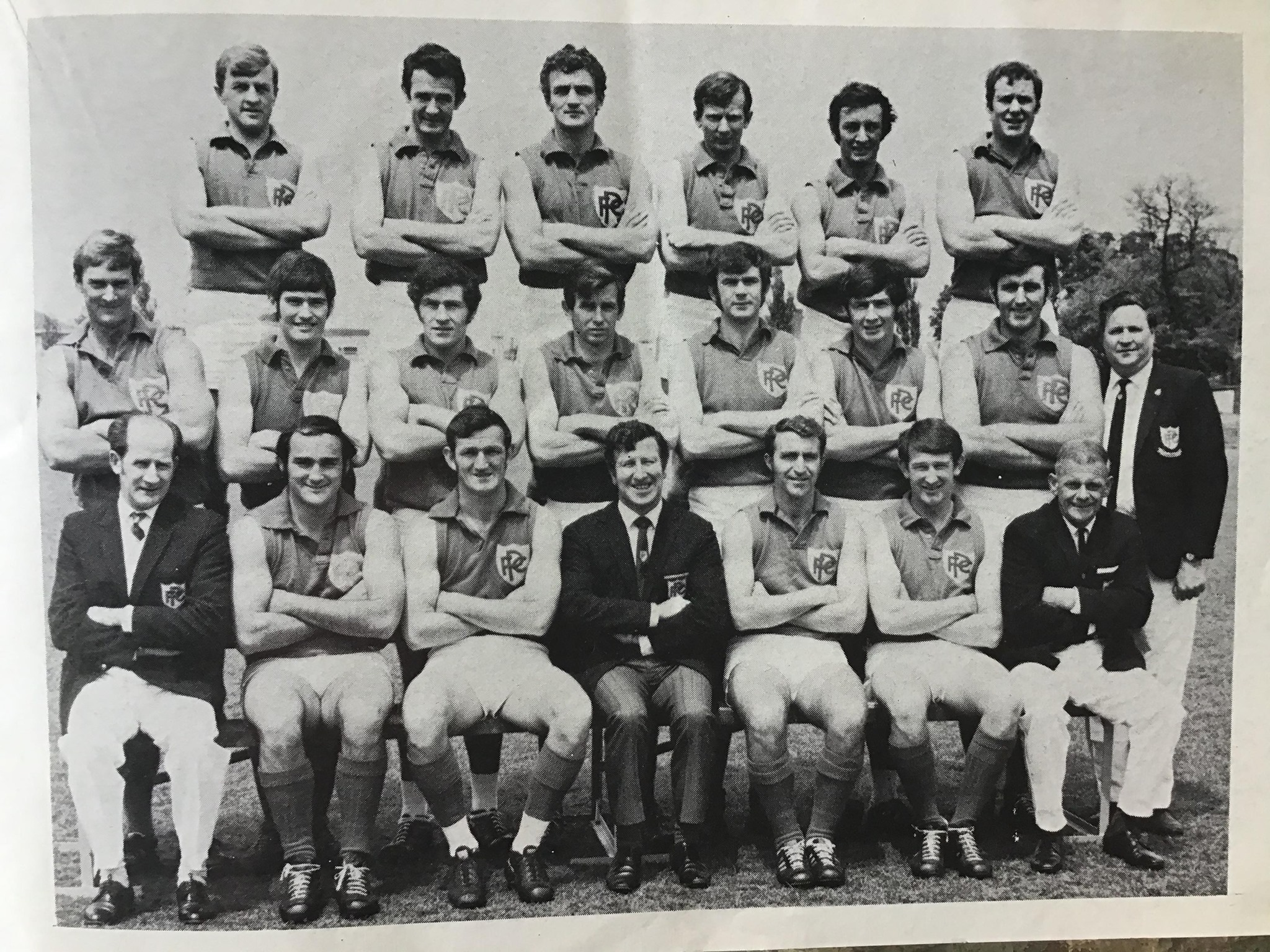
- Prahran – Division 1 premiers

Division 1
- Teams: 10
- Premiers: Prahran; 3rd D1 premiership
- Minor premiers: Prahran; 3rd D1 minor premiership

Division 2
- Teams: 10
- Premiers: Coburg; 1st D2 premiership
- Minor premiers: Coburg; 1st D2 minor premiership

The 1970 Victorian Football Association season was the 89th season of the top division of the Australian rules football competition, and the tenth season of second division competition. The Division 1 premiership was won by the Prahran Football Club, marking the club's third Division 1 premiership; it defeated Williamstown, which qualified for the Grand Final in its first season after promotion to Division 1, on 20 September by 50 points. The Division 2 premiership was won by Coburg, in its second season since being relegated from Division 1.

== Division 1 ==
The Division 1 home-and-home season was played over 18 rounds; the top four then contested the finals under the Page–McIntyre system. The finals returned to the St Kilda Cricket Ground for the first time since 1966.

=== Ladder ===
1970 VFA Division 1 Ladder
	TEAM	P	W	L	D	PF	PA	Pct	PTS
1	Prahran (P)	18	15	3	0	2102	1561	134.6	60
2	Williamstown	18	13	5	0	1962	1723	113.5	52
3	Port Melbourne	18	11	7	0	1890	1531	123.5	44
4	Waverley	18	11	7	0	2045	1720	118.9	44
5	Sandringham	18	11	7	0	2083	1975	105.9	44
6	Preston	18	11	7	0	1994	1700	105.4	44
7	Dandenong	18	10	8	0	1936	1630	118.7	40
8	Oakleigh	18	4	14	0	1656	2128	77.8	16
9	Geelong West	18	3	15	0	1581	2337	67.6	12
10	Yarraville	18	1	17	0	1585	2324	68.2	4
Key: P = Played, W = Won, L = Lost, D = Drawn, PF = Points For, PA = Points Against, Pct = Percentage; (P) = Premiers, PTS = Premiership points								Source	

=== Finals ===
	Semi-finals
Sunday, 30 August	Port Melbourne 10.15 (75)	def. by	Waverley 15.16 (106)	St Kilda Cricket Ground
Sunday, 6 September	Prahran 10.15 (75)	def.	Williamstown 9.15 (69)	St Kilda Cricket Ground

	Preliminary Final
Sunday, 13 September	Williamstown 22.22 (154)	def.	Waverley 7.9 (51)	St Kilda Cricket Ground

1970 VFA Division 1 Grand Final
Sunday, 20 September	Prahran	def.	Williamstown	St Kilda Cricket Ground (crowd: 26,000)
3.5 (23); 9.7 (61); 16.15 (111); 17.18 (120)	Q1; Q2; Q3; Final	3.1 (19); 5.4 (34); 5.5 (35); 10.10 (70)	Umpires: Anderson
Bartlett 4, Knox 4, Dowsing 3, Marinko 2, Emselle, Karanicolas, Kenneally, Parker	Goals	Hayward 2, Jackman 2, Hayward 2, Papley, Patterson, Smith, Stark
Culpin (ribs)	Injuries

=== Awards ===
- The leading goalkicker for the third consecutive season was Jim Miller (Dandenong), who kicked 80 goals in the home-and-away season and did not participate in finals.
- The J. J. Liston Trophy was won by Fred Cook (Yarraville). Cook, who later became the Association's all-time leading goalkicker, won the award as Yarraville's first choice ruckman and compared with the rest of his career kicked relatively few goals during the year; he polled 41 votes and won the award by a wide margin of 14 votes, despite Yarraville winning only one game for the season. Kevin Jackman (Williamstown) was second with 27 votes, and Derek King (Oakleigh) finished third with 22 votes.
- Port Melbourne won the seconds premiership. Port Melbourne 16.18 (114) defeated Preston 14.9 (93) in the Grand Final, played as a stand-alone match on Saturday 12 September at Toorak Park.

== Division 2 ==
The Division 2 home-and-home season was played over eighteen rounds; the top four then contested the finals under the Page–McIntyre system; all finals were played on Sundays at Toorak Park.

=== Ladder ===
1970 VFA Division 2 Ladder
	TEAM	P	W	L	D	PF	PA	Pct	PTS
1	Coburg (P)	18	16	2	0	2472	1379	179.1	64
2	Sunshine	18	15	3	0	2228	1496	148.8	60
3	Box Hill	18	12	5	1	1859	1669	111.3	50
4	Brunswick	18	10	8	0	1781	1714	103.9	40
5	Caulfield	18	9	9	0	1892	1915	95.1	36
6	Frankston	18	8	10	0	1715	1987	86.3	32
7	Mordialloc	18	7	10	1	1449	1798	80.5	30
8	Northcote	18	7	11	0	1621	1853	87.4	28
9	Werribee	18	3	15	0	1524	2022	75.3	12
10	Camberwell	18	2	16	0	1284	2010	63.8	8
Key: P = Played, W = Won, L = Lost, D = Drawn, PF = Points For, PA = Points Against, Pct = Percentage; (P) = Premiers, PTS = Premiership points								Source	

=== Finals ===
	Semi-finals
Sunday, 16 August	Box Hill 20.15 (135)	def.	Brunswick 16.7 (103)	Toorak Park
Sunday, 23 August	Coburg 25.12 (162)	def.	Sunshine 14.12 (96)	Toorak Park

	Preliminary Final
Sunday, 30 August	Sunshine 12.12 (84)	def. by	Box Hill 16.7 (103)	Toorak Park

1970 VFA Division 2 Grand Final
Sunday, 6 September	Coburg	def.	Box Hill	Toorak Park (crowd: 8,000)
5.4 (34); 11.13 (79); 16.15 (111); 20.17 (137)	Q1; Q2; Q3; Final	4.2 (26); 8.6 (54); 12.10 (82); 16.11 (107)	Umpires: Anderson
Sporton 5, Hepper 4, McCarthy 3, Morrison 3, Kirkman 2, Gale, Marsh, Sullivan	Goals	Barnett 6, Dawson 3, Abbott 2, Baker 2, Smith 2, Crisp

=== Awards ===
- The leading goalkicker for Division 2 was George Allen (Sunshine), who kicked 73 goals in the home-and-away season, and 80 goals overall.
- The J. J. Field Medal was won by Greg Smith (Mordialloc), who polled 39 votes. Smith finished ahead of Bob Kirkman (Coburg), who was second with 33 votes.
- Northcote won the seconds premiership. Northcote 15.19 (109) defeated Sunshine 13.14 (92) in the Grand Final, held as a stand-alone match on Saturday 29 August at Skinner Reserve.

== Notable events ==
- On 16 March, the Association was formally expelled from the Australian National Football Council as punishment for its refusal to establish a clearance reciprocity agreement with the Victorian Football League during the previous season. The expulsion passed by a vote of 6–3, and brought an end to the Association's twenty-year affiliation with the national body. As a consequence of the expulsion, the League was now free under ANFC rules to field Association players without a permit; likewise the Association could field League players without a permit, but it had already been doing so against ANFC rules.
- Prior to the season, the Broadmeadows Football Club submitted an application to join the Association; but the application was rejected because Association was not interested in expanding beyond twenty teams.
- On 26 April, Prahran defeated Preston to end Preston's 18-match winning streak.
- The final round in Division 1 saw one of the closest finishes to the home-and-away in Association history, with five teams – Sandringham, Port Melbourne, Dandenong, Waverley and Preston – battling in the final round for the last two positions in the final four. In the final round:
  - Sandringham, which could have claimed third place with a victory, suffered a heavy loss against Williamstown, trailing by 57 points at quarter time before losing by 41 points
  - Port Melbourne defeated Dandenong by 13 points to claim third place from Sandringham on percentage, and leave Dandenong out of the finals by four premiership points
  - Waverley defeated Oakleigh by 93 points to claim fourth place from Sandringham on percentage
  - Preston defeated Geelong West by 32 points, falling 0.5%pts short of passing Sandringham on percentage for fifth place; the percentage gap to Waverley for fourth place was in any case insurmountable, so Waverley's win eliminated Preston from finals contention.
- Williamstown reached the Division 1 Grand Final in its first season after promotion from Division 2. It was the best performance by a team in its first season after promotion in the history of Division 2.

== See also ==
- List of VFA/VFL premiers
