= 1960 VFA season =

79th season of the Victorian Football Association

Overview
- Teams: 17
- Premiers: Oakleigh; 5th premiership
- Minor premiers: Sandringham; 1st minor premiership

The 1960 VFA season was the 79th season of the Victorian Football Association (VFA), an Australian rules football competition played in the state of Victoria. The premiership was won by the Oakleigh Football Club for the fifth time, after it defeated Sandringham by 60 points in the grand final on 1 October.

The season was the first in which Association premiership matches were played on Sunday afternoons, a change which dramatically increased the Association's popularity over the following decades.

== Association membership ==
The Prahran Football Club was re-admitted to the Association in 1960, bringing the number of teams to seventeen. Prahran had been expelled in 1959 when the Prahran Council leased Toorak Park to the Victorian Rugby Union on alternate Saturdays, leaving the football club unable to meet the Association's minimum home ground requirements, but the club was re-admitted once it had secured a winter-long lease for the ground.

It was speculated that the Association would admit an eighteenth team to avoid the need for a bye in the fixture, and because it had previously announced its strategic intention to expand to twenty teams. Several groups interested in applying for the Association were mentioned in the press during 1959, including the North Geelong Football Club, the Altona City Council and a group of locals from Broadmeadows; but, ultimately the Association did not find a club with suitable facilities, so the membership remained at seventeen clubs.

== Sunday football ==
On 1 April 1960, the Association approved for the first time the playing of VFA premiership matches on Sunday afternoons. Amateur football and charity and practice matches had been played on Sundays in Melbourne before, but top level commercial senior football had not. Playing on Sunday had long been seen as a strong opportunity for the Association to improve its popularity, as it would not be competing for gate takings with the Victorian Football League, which was played entirely on Saturdays; however, Sunday trading was still decades away from being legal, and neither councils nor communities widely approved of playing professional and commercial sport on Sundays. The Association had formally considered and rejected playing on Sundays twice before, most recently in 1957 (when night football was introduced as an alternative timeslot in which the Association would not be competing with League matches).

Although the Association approved Sunday matches, it did not formally schedule any to be played. Instead, clubs were given free rein to move any Saturday game to Sunday, provided there was mutual agreement between the clubs involved, and it was approved by the grounds management committee and the local council; additionally, the Association committed to donating 25% of Sunday gates to charity. The number of games on any given Sunday in 1960 varied from none to as many as three.

The first Sunday game was played on 24 April between Brunswick and Coburg; the match, which also happened to the Brunswick's first match back at Brunswick Park after its redevelopment in 1959, drew a crowd of 17,000, Brunswick's highest home crowd since the 1930s; Coburg 12.17 (89) defeated Brunswick 9.17 (71). Other Sunday matches drew huge crowds: on 15 May, Northcote drew a larger crowd to a rain-affected Sunday match than it had drawn to any dry weather Saturday match for more than five years; and on 17 July, a Sunday game between ladder-leaders Oakleigh and winless Prahran, which would normally have roused little interest due to its one-sided nature, drew a gate of £310, compared with the combined gate of £391 for all seven of that weekend's Saturday games.

Despite the successful crowds, the matches were not universally accepted in 1960. Nine of the seventeen councils had approved Sunday matches within six weeks of the VFA announcing them, but some councils were slower to move – the Box Hill council, for example, did not approve Sunday matches until 1969. The Sandringham Football Club committee voted not to play any matches on Sundays during 1960. Yarraville played before large Sunday crowds early in the season, but refused requests and opted for smaller Saturday crowds later in the year because one of its star players, Geoff Williams, was unavailable to play on Sundays and it didn't want to jeopardise its premiership chances by playing without him. Another consequence of the Association playing on Sundays was a significant reduction in attendances at amateur games, which had previously been the highest level of football played on Sunday.

Sunday football went on to provide the most significant and lasting popularity boost to the Association since the throw-pass era in the 1930s and 1940s. By the early 1970s, almost all Association matches were played on Sunday, and the State Government refused to allow the League to play its matches on Sunday, meaning that the two competitions were no longer competing for the same gate. This fixturing segregation between the competitions continued until 1979, when the VFL began playing occasional televised matches in Sydney on Sundays; this was followed by the South Melbourne Football Club moving permanently Sydney in 1982 and playing all home games on Sunday, followed by progressively introducing Sunday VFL matches in Victoria through the mid-1980s.

== Premiership ==
With seventeen teams, the format of the season changed from previous years. The home-and-home season lasted for twenty weeks, arranged as nineteen rounds with one of those rounds split across two weekends. Each team played eighteen home-and-home matches with one bye – except for Prahran and Brighton, who each had two byes, but played an extra match (against each other) during the split round.

The top six teams then qualified for the finals series; in all previous years since the introduction of finals in 1903, four teams had played finals. Under the new final six system, used only in this season:

- In the first week, two quarter-finals were held: 3rd vs 6th, and 4th vs 5th
- In the second week, the winners of the quarter-finals played the first semi-final
- In the third week, the second semi-final was played between 1st vs 2nd
- In the fourth week, the preliminary final was played between the winner of the first semi-final and the loser of the second semi-final
- In the fifth week, the Grand Final was played between the winner of the second semi-final and the winner of the preliminary final

=== Ladder ===
1960 VFA ladder
	TEAM	P	W	L	D	PF	PA	Pct	PTS
1	Sandringham	18	15	3	0	2133	942	226.4	60
2	Oakleigh (P)	18	15	3	0	1826	1088	167.8	60
3	Yarraville	18	14	3	1	1584	1085	145.9	58
4	Williamstown	18	14	4	0	1945	1066	154.3	56
5	Coburg	18	13	5	0	1752	1218	143.8	52
6	Moorabbin	18	12	6	0	1716	1270	134.9	50
7	Mordialloc	18	11	7	0	1377	1254	109.8	44
8	Port Melbourne	18	9	8	1	1481	1300	113.9	38
9	Brunswick	18	9	9	0	1246	1272	980	36
10	Box Hill	18	9	9	0	1381	1430	96.6	36
11	Dandenong	18	8	10	0	1326	1443	91.9	32
12	Northcote	18	6	11	1	1295	1665	77.0	26
13	Sunshine	18	4	13	1	1171	1620	72.3	18
14	Preston	18	4	14	0	1112	1557	71.4	16
15	Camberwell	18	4	14	0	1163	1743	66.7	16
16	Brighton	18	3	15	0	977	2131	45.8	12
17	Prahran	18	1	17	0	871	1948	44.7	4
Key: P = Played, W = Won, L = Lost, D = Drawn, PF = Points For, PA = Points Against, Pct = Percentage; (P) = Premiers, PTS = Premiership points								Source	

=== Finals ===
	Quarter-finals
Saturday, 3 September (12:00 pm)	Yarraville 18.10 (118)	def.	Moorabbin 15.5 (95)	St Kilda Cricket Ground (crowd: 9,000 CR)
Saturday, 3 September (2:30 pm)	Williamstown 12.10 (82)	def.	Coburg 6.11 (47)	St Kilda Cricket Ground (crowd: 9,000)

	Semifinals
Saturday, 10 September	Yarraville 9.8 (62)	def. by	Williamstown 8.19 (67)	St Kilda Cricket Ground (crowd: 8,000)
Saturday, 17 September	Sandringham 10.11 (71)	def.	Oakleigh 8.11 (59)	St Kilda Cricket Ground (crowd: 8,000)

	Preliminary Final
Saturday, 24 September	Oakleigh 6.12 (48)	def.	Williamstown 4.9 (33)	St Kilda Cricket Ground (crowd: 8,000)

1960 VFA Grand Final
Saturday, 1 October	Sandringham	def. by	Oakleigh	St Kilda Cricket Ground (crowd: 30,000)
2.4 (16); 3.4 (22); 7.10 (52); 8.14 (62)	Q1; Q2; Q3; Final	1.2 (8); 8.9 (57); 10.12 (72); 18.14 (122)	Umpires: F. Allen
Bouyer 3, Richards 2, Strachan 2, Murray	Goals	Jones 5, Coughlan 3, Allsopp 2, McCooke 2, Naismith 2, Ash, Buckley, d'Arcy, Pannam
Gleeson (arm), Ransom (knee)	Injuries	Clements (leg)

== Awards ==
- The leading goalkicker for the season was Denis Oakley (Sandringham), who kicked 89 goals in the home-and-home season.
- The J. J. Liston Trophy was won by Don Brown (Box Hill), who polled 45 votes. Brown finished ahead of Kevin Dillon (Brunswick), who polled 32 votes to finish second for the second straight year, and Max Jose (Mordialloc), who polled 30 votes.
- Sandringham won the seconds premiership. Sandringham 15.8 (98) defeated Oakleigh 11.14 (80) in the Grand Final, played as a curtain-raiser to the firsts Grand Final between the same two clubs on 1 October.
- The Gillon Medal (best-and-fairest medal) in the under-19s competition was won by Jim Sullivan (Coburg).

== Notable events ==
=== 1960 Minor States Carnival ===
As a result of finishing last in the 1958 Melbourne Carnival, the Association was relegated to Division 2 of the ANFC championships. The 1960 Minor States Carnival was held in Sydney during 1960, with the winner then playing off a month later against the Australian Amateurs, winners of the Division 2 competition in 1958, in Canberra for promotion to Division 1. Matches were played with the national standard eighteen players per team, rather than the sixteen players used under Association rules. Brunswick's Jim Whiley captained the VFA team.

The Association team dominated the Sydney Carnival, winning all three games by more than 100 points; it then defeated the Amateurs by 26 points in the playoff match.

	1960 Minor States Carnival
Sunday, 26 June	Victoria (VFA) 17.31 (133)	def.	Canberra 3.11 (29)	Trumper Park (crowd: 6,000)
Wednesday, 29 June	Victoria (VFA) 22.20 (152)	def.	Queensland 3.7 (25)	Trumper Park
Sunday, 3 June	Victoria (VFA) 23.24 (162)	def.	New South Wales 8.9 (57)	Trumper Park
Sunday, 31 July	Australian Amateurs 8.7 (55)	def. by	Victoria (VFA) 12.9 (81)	Manuka Oval

=== Other notable events ===
- The Oakleigh Council upgraded the Oakleigh Cricket Ground during the 1960 season, so the Oakleigh Football Club could not play there. During its premiership-winning season, Oakleigh played its home matches at Camberwell, playing home games there on alternate Saturdays to the Camberwell Football Club. The club trained at Toorak Park on different nights to the Prahran Football Club during the home-and-home season, and then on the Ross Gregory Oval in Albert Park during the finals when Toorak Park was being prepared for the cricket season.
- Sunshine's inaugural VFA captain-coach Ken Seymour was suspended until 1962 for three separate striking charges, a charge of treading on an opponent, and a charge of misconduct against an umpire, all in a match against Yarraville on 13 August. He retired from playing immediately.
- Minor premiers Sandringham set a record as the first club to score more than 2000 points and concede fewer than 1000 points in a home-and-home season.
- The VFA sought to play the quarter-final between Coburg and Williamstown on Sunday 4 September at the Coburg Oval, with the Sunday timeslot expected to result in a substantial increase in the gate, but Williamstown refused to play the final at Coburg's home ground. Consequently, both quarter-finals were played at St Kilda on Saturday 3 September as a double-header. The scheduling meant that the seconds quarter-finals could not be played as curtain raisers to the firsts quarter-finals, so they were played on the same day at Selwyn Park, Sunshine, also as a double-header.
- In the final round of home-and-home matches in the seconds competition, Coburg played Port Melbourne in a game which directly determined which of the two clubs made the final six and which missed out. Coburg initially won the game by one point, but the win was two days later awarded to Port Melbourne after it successfully protested that Coburg had a fielded a player who was not listed on its team sheet.

== See also ==
- List of VFA/VFL Premiers
