= Kerry Ryan =

Australian rules footballer

Personal information
- Full name: Kerry Ryan
- Born: 14 February 1947 (age 79)
- Original team: Prahran
- Height: 177 cm (5 ft 10 in)
- Weight: 84.5 kg (186 lb)

Playing career^{1}
Years	Club	Games (Goals)
1966	Melbourne	1 (1)
- ^{1} Playing statistics correct to the end of 1966.

Kerry Ryan (born 14 February 1947) is a former Australian rules footballer who played with Melbourne in the Victorian Football League (VFL).
