= Jim Sullivan (Australian footballer) =

Former Australian rules football player

Personal information
- Full name: James Sullivan
- Nickname: Sleepy
- Born: 1942 (age 83–84)
- Height: 179 cm (5 ft 10 in)
- Position: Centreman

Playing career
Years	Club	Games (Goals)
1961–1964	Carlton (VFL reserves)	17 (25)
1962–1964	Coburg (VFA)	86 (53) (Note: Coburg's website lists Sullivan as playing 86 games for the club, although the club has also previously claimed he played 92 games. The VFA Project lists Sullivan with 66 games and 53 goals, although that website notes that records are incomplete.)

Career highlights
- Gillon Medal: 1960; J. J. Liston Trophy: 1967; J. Field Medal: 1969; VFA premiership: 1970; Coburg Team of the Century

James Sullivan (born 1942) is a former Australian rules footballer who played for the Coburg Football Club in the Victorian Football Association (VFA). He is a member of Coburg's hall of fame, and the club's best and fairest award − the Jim Sullivan Medal − is named after him.

== Career ==
Sullivan first came to prominence when he won the Gillon Medal (best and fairest medal) in the VFA under-19s while playing for Coburg in 1960. He joined the Carlton Football Club in the Victorian Football League (VFL) the following year, where he finished equal second in the VFL under-19s best-and-fairest.

In 1962, Sullivan was promoted to Carlton's reserves list, although he had played at least five reserves games in 1961. He played two games in the 1963 Night Series Cup, including a semi-final loss to Footscray where he kicked one goal. He moved to North Melbourne in May 1964 in an attempt to get on their senior list, but it didn't happen as he "was a relaxed character who wouldn't let the game rule his life".

Sullivan returned to Coburg in 1965 where he made his senior debut for the club. He won the J. J. Liston Trophy in 1967 as the best and fairest player in Division 1, polling 38 votes.

Following the end of the 1967 VFA season, Sullivan was recruited by Claremont Football Club and moved to Perth to play in the West Australian National Football League (WANFL). However, after only one season, he returned to Coburg for the 1969 VFA season.

By 1969, Coburg had been relegated from Division 1. Sullivan amassed 54 kicks in a match that season (the second-highest recorded in senior football competition and the highest in the VFA) and he later won the Division 2 best and fairest, the J. Field Medal. He then played in Coburg's 1970 Division 2 grand final victory over Box Hill.

Sullivan played around 90 VFA games, although Coburg notes that "strangely" he never won a senior award at the club. He later moved to Reservoir Lakeside in the Diamond Valley Football League (DVFL), before injury forced him into retirement in 1973.
