= Rod Payne (Australian footballer) =

Australian rules footballer (1945–2019)

Personal information
- Full name: Roderick Mitchell Payne
- Born: 22 January 1945
- Died: 21 December 2019 (aged 74)
- Original team: Prahran

Playing career^{1}
Years	Club	Games (Goals)
1970	Melbourne	13 (6)
- ^{1} Playing statistics correct to the end of 1970.

Roderick Mitchell Payne (22 January 1945 – 21 December 2019) was an Australian rules footballer who played with Melbourne in the Victorian Football League (VFL).
