= 1951 VFA season =

1951 VFA premiership season
- Teams: 14
- Premiers: Prahran; 3rd premiership
- Minor premiers: Port Melbourne; 3rd minor premiership

The 1951 Victorian Football Association season was the 70th season of the Australian rules football competition. The premiership was won by the Prahran Football Club, after it defeated Port Melbourne by nine points in the Grand Final on 6 October. It was Prahran's second VFA premiership.

== Association membership ==
For the first time since 1929, the membership of the Association changed, expanding from twelve clubs to fourteen. The Association saw itself in a strong enough position to provide the opportunity for top level senior football in the booming outer suburbs which were experiencing strong post-war growth. In August 1950, the Association delegates unanimously voted to admit two new clubs for 1951:

- Box Hill Football Club – winners of three Eastern Suburban League premierships since 1945, and tenants of the high quality Box Hill City Oval.
- Moorabbin Football Club – nicknamed the Kangaroos, winners of six Federal District League premierships in the previous seven seasons. Moorabbin played its home games at the Cheltenham Recreation Reserve in 1951, but as a condition of admission and with the support of the city council, it developed the Moorabbin Oval to use as its home ground from 1952 onwards.

== Premiership ==
The home-and-home season was played over twenty matches, before the top four clubs contested a finals series under the Page–McIntyre system to determine the premiers for the season.

=== Ladder ===
1951 VFA ladder
Pos	Team	Pld	W	L	D	PF	PA	PP	Pts
1	Port Melbourne	20	16	3	1	2028	1322	153.4	66
2	Prahran (P)	20	16	4	0	1899	1560	121.7	64
3	Sandringham	20	15	5	0	2017	1568	128.6	60
4	Oakleigh	20	13	6	1	2015	1537	131.1	54
5	Brighton	20	12	8	0	1874	1685	111.2	48
6	Northcote	20	11	9	0	1418	1384	102.5	44
7	Williamstown	20	10	9	1	1788	1528	117.0	42
8	Brunswick	20	10	9	1	1443	1436	100.5	42
9	Coburg	20	10	10	0	1770	1688	104.9	40
10	Preston	20	8	10	2	1627	1683	96.7	36
11	Yarraville	20	9	11	0	1554	1724	90.1	36
12	Camberwell	20	3	16	1	1409	1949	72.3	14
13	Moorabbin	20	3	17	0	1571	2133	73.7	12
14	Box Hill	20	0	19	1	1121	2334	48.0	2

Rules for classification: 1) points; 2) percentage; 3) number of points for.
(P) Premiers

=== Finals ===
	Semifinals
Saturday, 15 September	Sandringham 11.16 (82)	def. by	Oakleigh 15.11 (101)	St Kilda Cricket Ground (crowd: 20,000)
Saturday, 22 September	Port Melbourne 12.13 (85)	def. by	Prahran 19.19 (133)	St Kilda Cricket Ground

	Preliminary Final
Saturday, 29 September	Port Melbourne 9.10 (64)	def.	Oakleigh 8.9 (57)	St Kilda Cricket Ground (crowd: 20,000)

1951 VFA Grand Final
Saturday, 6 October	Prahran	def.	Port Melbourne	St Kilda Cricket Ground (crowd: 32,500)
1.6 (12); 4.8 (32); 8.9 (57); 11.13 (79)	Q1; Q2; Q3; Final	2.1 (13); 4.2 (26); 8.6 (54); 10.10 (70)	Umpires: Merrington
Burgess 3, McCullock 2, Shillabeer 2, Grambeau, Harvey, Walsh, Worrall	Goals	Miller 5, Walsh 2, Laffey, Lowrie, Murray
Shillabeer (shoulder)	Injuries	Walsh (leg/ankle), Tucker (cramp)

== Awards ==
- The leading goalkicker for the season was Bruce Harper (Sandringham), who kicked 101 goals in the home-and-home season and 104 goals overall.
- The J. J. Liston Trophy was won by Cec Hiscox (Northcote), who polled 40 votes. Frank Johnson (Port Melbourne) and Walsh (Prahran) were equal second with 28 votes.
- Port Melbourne won the seconds premiership. Port Melbourne 9.17 (71) defeated Yarraville 9.10 (64) in the Grand Final, played as a curtain raiser to the firsts Grand Final on 6 October.

== Notable events ==
- After increasing factional in-fighting within the Board of Management, former Brighton president Lewis Page took over the presidency of the Association, after he challenged and defeated incumbent Dr Frank Hartnett, who had served as president since August 1949, at the annual general meeting in February 1951. After the original vote was tied 16–16, Hartnett stepped aside by giving his casting vote to Page. Page served as president from 1951 until 1954.
- Because the Association had finished last in the top division of the 1950 Brisbane Carnival, it was required to play off against the winners of the lower division, the Australian Amateurs, to determine which team qualified for the top division at the next carnival, held in Adelaide in 1953. The play-off match was held at Manuka Oval, Canberra, on Saturday 14 July. The Association 20.17 (137) defeated the Amateurs 12.12 (84), to retain their place in the 1953 Carnival. The crowd was 2,500, and Prime Minister Robert Menzies executed the opening bounce of the match.
- Association representative teams played two other interstate matches during the season:
  - On Wednesday 9 May, South Australia 28.19 (187) defeated the Association 13.14 (92) at Adelaide Oval before a crowd of 21,000.
  - On Saturday 30 June, the Association 26.15 (171) defeated Tasmania 12.11 (83) at North Hobart Oval, before a crowd of 6,949.

== See also ==
- List of VFA/VFL Premiers
