= Graeme McMahon =

Australian rules footballer and executive

Graeme McMahon (15 February 1940 – 1 July 2014) was an Australian rules football player and executive, best known as chairman of Essendon from 1997 to 2003.

McMahon was born in Essendon, Victoria in 1940. At a young age, he began playing Australian football and played for the Essendon Football Club's under-19 premiership team in 1958. He went on to play over 100 games for Prahran Football Club in the Victorian Football Association (VFA), captaining their team in 1967, and was named in their team of the century. In 1997, McMahon became the chairman of Essendon and also joined the AFL Commission. Essendon won one premiership during his time as chairman, in 2000.

In 2003 he was selected in Prahran's Team of the Century.

McMahon worked at Ansett Australia for most of his life, moving up from the mail room to the chief executive, and retired in 1996 after nearly 40 years. He fought cancer twice previously but died at the age of 74 on 1 July 2014.
