= Bill Morrow (footballer) =

Australian rules footballer

Personal information
- Full name: William George Morrow
- Born: 5 October 1928
- Died: 4 October 2002 (aged 73)
- Original team: Prahran
- Position: Centre half forward

Playing career^{1}
Years	Club	Games (Goals)
1953	Melbourne	6 (4)
- ^{1} Playing statistics correct to the end of 1953.

William George Morrow (5 October 1928 – 4 October 2002) was an Australian rules footballer who played with Melbourne in the Victorian Football League (VFL).

In 2003 he was selected in Prahran's Team of the Century.
