= Frank Smith (Australian rules footballer) =

Australian rules footballer, born 1905

Personal information
- Full name: Frank Smith
- Born: 5 March 1905
- Died: 7 December 1968 (aged 63)
- Original team: Prahran
- Height: 173 cm (5 ft 8 in)
- Weight: 66 kg (146 lb)

Playing career^{1}
Years	Club	Games (Goals)
1931–32	Melbourne	14 (0)
- ^{1} Playing statistics correct to the end of 1932.

Frank Smith (5 March 1905 – 7 December 1968) was an Australian rules footballer who played with Melbourne in the Victorian Football League (VFL).

In 2003 he was selected in Prahran's Team of the Century.
