= List of International Rules Series results =

The International Rules Series is a senior men's competition played under the laws of international rules football, a hybrid sport combining elements of Gaelic football and Australian rules football. The series is overseen by the governing bodies of the two sports, the Gaelic Athletic Association and Australian Football League. This page lists results of each test match in the series. Click on a series year for a more detailed analysis of results.

== Results ==
Though the first Australian Football World Tour took place in 1967, it wasn't until 1984 that the first organised series sanctioned by the two governing bodies occurred. The four series that took place from 1984 to 1990 featured three test matches each, with the winning nation being the one to secure at least two victories. Since 1998 each series has been played over two matches, with the winning nation being the one to score the highest amount on aggregate over the two tests. This excludes the 2014 and 2015 series, which were both one-off matches.

Scores are given in the form [goals] [overs] [behinds] ([points]). A goal equals 6 points, an over 3, and a behind 1. So 2.9.7 (46) means 2 goals, 9 overs and 7 behinds; 2(6) + 9(3) + 7(1) = 12 + 27 + 7 = 46 points in total.

#	Series	Date	Home Nation	Score	Away Nation	Score	Ground	Crowd	Agg.	Series Winner	H2H
1	1984	21/10	Ireland	4.8.9 (57)	Australia	2.15.13 (70)	Páirc Uí Chaoimh	8,000	+14	Australia	+1
2	1984	28/10	Ireland	3.18.8 (80)	Australia	1.18.16 (76)	Croke Park (Páirc an Chrócaigh)	12,500	+14	Australia	0
3	1984	4/11	Ireland	5.11.8 (71)	Australia	1.18.16 (76)	Croke Park (Páirc an Chrócaigh)	32,318	+14	Australia	+1
4	1986	11/10	Australia	1.14.16 (64)	Ireland	5.5.12 (57)	WACA Ground	25,000	+32	Ireland	+2
5	1986	19/10	Australia	1.10.10 (46)	Ireland	3.10.14 (62)	VFL Park	10,883	+32	Ireland	+1
6	1986	24/10	Australia	0.7.11 (32)	Ireland	4.8.7 (55)	Football Park	10,000	+32	Ireland	0
7	1987	18/10	Ireland	3.7.14 (53)	Australia	1.11.12 (51)	Croke Park (Páirc an Chrócaigh)	15,532	+23	Australia	+1
8	1987	1/11	Ireland	3.6.11 (47)	Australia	3.14.12 (72)	Croke Park (Páirc an Chrócaigh)	15,485	+23	Australia	0
9	1987	8/11	Ireland	1.13.10 (55)	Australia	0.14.17 (59)	Croke Park (Páirc an Chrócaigh)	27,023	+23	Australia	+1
10	1990	2/11	Australia	0.10.8 (38)	Ireland	0.12.11 (47)	Waverley Park	18,332	+24	Ireland	0
11	1990	10/11	Australia	0.7.10 (31)	Ireland	3.9.7 (52)	Bruce Stadium	7,000	+24	Ireland	+1
12	1990	17/11	Australia	0.13.11 (50)	Ireland	0.12.8 (44)	WACA Ground	7,700	+24	Ireland	0
13	1998	11/10	Ireland	2.13.10 (61)	Australia	2.13.11 (62)	Croke Park (Páirc an Chrócaigh)	22,900	+24	Ireland	+1
14	1998	18/10	Ireland	4.12.7 (67)	Australia	2.10.14 (56)	Croke Park (Páirc an Chrócaigh)	35,221	+24	Ireland	0
15	1999	8/10	Australia	0.16.14 (62)	Ireland	2.16.10 (70)	Melbourne Cricket Ground	64,326	+8	Ireland	+1
16	1999	15/10	Australia	2.12.4 (52)	Ireland	1.11.13 (52)	Football Park	45,187	+8	Ireland	+1
17	2000	8/10	Ireland	1.11.8 (47)	Australia	0.14.13 (55)	Croke Park (Páirc an Chrócaigh)	38,016	+25	Australia	0
18	2000	15/10	Ireland	1.12.9 (51)	Australia	2.15.11 (68)	Croke Park (Páirc an Chrócaigh)	57,289	+25	Australia	+1
19	2001	12/10	Australia	1.13.8 (53)	Ireland	2.13.8 (59)	Melbourne Cricket Ground	48,121	+25	Ireland	0
20	2001	19/10	Australia	1.13.7 (52)	Ireland	2.17.8 (71)	Football Park	31,713	+25	Ireland	+1
21	2002	13/10	Ireland	1.14.10 (58)	Australia	2.15.8 (65)	Croke Park (Páirc an Chrócaigh)	44,221	+7	Australia	0
22	2002	20/10	Ireland	1.8.12 (42)	Australia	1.11.3 (42)	Croke Park (Páirc an Chrócaigh)	71,544	+7	Australia	0
23	2003	24/10	Australia	3.10.8 (56)	Ireland	1.10.10 (46)	Subiaco Oval	41,228	+7	Australia	+1
24	2003	31/10	Australia	1.10.9 (45)	Ireland	2.9.9 (48)	Melbourne Cricket Ground	60,235	+7	Australia	0
25	2004	17/10	Ireland	3.17.8 (77)	Australia	1.9.8 (41)	Croke Park (Páirc an Chrócaigh)	46,370	+50	Ireland	+1
26	2004	24/10	Ireland	1.13.10 (55)	Australia	0.13.2 (41)	Croke Park (Páirc an Chrócaigh)	60,515	+50	Ireland	+2
27	2005	21/10	Australia	2.27.7 (100)	Ireland	3.11.13 (64)	Subiaco Oval	39,098	+57	Australia	+1
28	2005	28/10	Australia	0.18.9 (63)	Ireland	0.11.9 (42)	Telstra Dome	45,428	+57	Australia	0
29	2006	28/10	Ireland	1.12.6 (48)	Australia	1.9.7 (40)	Pearse Stadium (Páirc an Phiarsaigh)	35,000	+30	Australia	+1
30	2006	5/11	Ireland	0.7.10 (31)	Australia	3.15.6 (69)	Croke Park (Páirc an Chrócaigh)	82,127	+30	Australia	0
31	2008	24/10	Australia	0.12.8 (44)	Ireland	3.6.9 (45)	Subiaco Oval	35,153	+5	Ireland	+1
32	2008	31/10	Australia	3.8.11 (53)	Ireland	4.8.9 (57)	Melbourne Cricket Ground	42,823	+5	Ireland	+2
33	2010	23/10	Ireland	1.8.10 (40)	Australia	0.14.5 (47)	Gaelic Grounds	30,117	+10	Australia	+1
34	2010	30/10	Ireland	1.11.13 (52)	Australia	0.14.13 (55)	Croke Park (Páirc an Chrócaigh)	61,842	+10	Australia	0
35	2011	28/10	Australia	1.8.6 (36)	Ireland	4.17.5 (80)	Etihad Stadium	22,921	+65	Ireland	+1
36	2011	4/11	Australia	0.7.8 (29)	Ireland	1.13.5 (50)	Metricon Stadium	12,545	+65	Ireland	+2
37	2013	19/10	Ireland	2.12.9 (57)	Australia	1.7.8 (35)	Breffni Park	17,657	+101	Ireland	+3
38	2013	26/10	Ireland	6.22.14 (116)	Australia	2.7.4 (37)	Croke Park (Páirc an Chrócaigh)	28,525	+101	Ireland	+4
39	2014	22/11	Australia	0.17.5 (56)	Ireland	2.9.7 (46)	Patersons Stadium	38,262	+10	Australia	+3
40	2015	21/11	Ireland	3.11.5 (56)	Australia	1.13.7 (52)	Croke Park (Páirc an Chrócaigh)	38,386	+10	Ireland	+4
41	2017	12/11	Australia	2.13.12 (63)	Ireland	1.13.8 (53)	Adelaide Oval	25,502	+13	Australia	+3
42	2017	18/11	Australia	0.15.8 (53)	Ireland	2.10.8 (50)	Domain Stadium	30,116	+13	Australia	+2

	Played	Won by Ireland	Won by Australia	Drawn
All Tests	42	21 (50%)	19 (45.2%)	2 (4.8%)
Tests in Australia	21	12 (57.1%)	8 (38.1%)	1 (4.8%)
Tests in Ireland	21	9 (42.9%)	11 (52.4%)	1 (4.8%)
All series	20	10 (50%)	10 (50%)	0 (0.0%)
Series in Australia	10	6 (60%)	4 (40%)	0 (0.0%)
Series in Ireland	10	4 (40%)	6 (60%)	0 (0.0%)
As of 1 January 2019

== Records ==
- Biggest series win (1998–2017): 101 points, 2013, Ireland 173–72 Australia
- Biggest test win (1998–2017): 79 points, second test 2013, Ireland 116–37 Australia
- Closest series (1998–2017): 4 points, 2015, Ireland 56–52 Australia (1 test only)
- Highest-scoring test (1998–2017): 164 points, first test 2005, Australia 100–64 Ireland
- Lowest-scoring test (1998–2017): 84 points, second test 2002, Ireland 42–42 Australia
- Highest attendance (1998–2017): 82,127, Croke Park, second test 2006
- Highest attendance (1984–1990): 32,318, Croke Park, third test 1984
- Lowest attendance (1998–2017): 12,545, Metricon Stadium, second test 2011
- Lowest attendance (1984–1990): 7,000, Bruce Stadium, second test 1990
- Average attendance (1998–2014): 42,898
- Average attendance (1984–1990): 33,648
- Record point scorer: Steven McDonnell (Ireland & Armagh), 119 points
- Australian clean sweeps: 4 (2000, 2005, 2010, 2017)
- Irish clean sweeps: 5 (2001, 2004, 2008, 2011, 2013)

== Other series ==
An under-17 boys series was contested by the nations until it was abandoned in 2006, and a solitary women's series was played in Ireland in 2006.

=== Under-17 ===
An under-17 boys series is believed to have been played yearly since 1996, though results for only these three tours are known.

Year	Test	Location	Date	Home nation	Score	Away nation	Series winner	Notes
2003	1	Galway	April	Ireland	?	Australia	Ireland	
2003	2	Dublin	17 April	Ireland	31–7	Australia	Ireland	
2003	3	Cork	21 April	Ireland	30–65	Australia	Ireland	
2005	1	Crossmaglen	April	Ireland	73–32	Australia	Ireland	
2005	2	Dublin	April	Ireland	44–56	Australia	Ireland	
2005	3	Killarney	April	Ireland	39–31	Australia	Ireland	
2006	1	Melbourne	April	Australia	39–39	Ireland	Australia	
2006	2	Adelaide	April	Australia	35–35	Ireland	Australia	
2006	3	Perth	April	Australia	45–30	Ireland	Australia	

Irish player of the series: Ray Cullivan (2005) & Kevin Nolan (2006)
Australian player of the series: Joel Selwood (2005) & Bryce Gibbs (2006)

=== Women ===
Year	Test	Location	Date	Home nation	Home score	Away nation	Away score	Series winner
2006	1	Cavan	31 October	Ireland	6.26.16 (134)	Australia	1.2.3 (15)	Ireland
2006	2	Dublin	4 November	Ireland	3.5.6 (39)	Australia	0.4.6 (18)	Ireland

== See also ==
- Australia international rules football team
- Ireland international rules football team
- Australia women's international rules football team
- Ireland women's international rules football team

== Sources ==
- International Rules at AustralianFootball.com
- Australian Football League (AFL) International Rules history
- Australia v Ireland 1967-2015 results
