= Ken Seymour =

Australian rules footballer (1930–1993)

Personal information
- Full name: Kenneth James Seymour
- Born: 16 September 1930
- Died: 27 March 1993 (aged 62)
- Height: 185 cm (6 ft 1 in)
- Weight: 103 kg (227 lb)

Playing career^{1}
Years	Club	Games (Goals)
1951–1955	Brunswick	
1956	Fitzroy	4 (1)
1956–1957	South Melbourne	8 (5)
1957–1958	Brunswick	
1959–1960	Sunshine	
- ^{1} Playing statistics correct to the end of 1960.

Kenneth James Seymour (16 September 1930 – 27 March 1993) was an Australian rules footballer who played with Fitzroy and South Melbourne in the Victorian Football League (VFL).

== Football career ==
Seymour, a follower, started his senior career in the Victorian Football Association (VFA). He played initially in the Brunswick seconds, then after a brief stint at Fitzroy, without playing a league game, was cleared by Fitzroy to Coburg in 1951. Due to a mix up with the permit, as a clearance was also required from Brunswick for him to play at another VFA club, Seymour ended up back at Brunswick. He remained with Brunswick until midway through the 1955 VFA season, which ended early for Seymour when the VFA tribunal handed down a long suspension. Claiming victimisation, Seymour vowed he would never to play VFA football again and began training with Fitzroy.

Aged 25, Seymour made his VFL debut in the opening round of the 1956 VFL season, against Footscray at Western Oval, coming on as a reserve. He only played three more games for Fitzroy, then in late June was cleared to South Melbourne. In round 13, Seymour debuted for South Melbourne and remained in the side for the rest of the season. His performance in South Melbourne's win over Footscray at Lake Oval earned praise.

Seymour played two games with South Melbourne the following year, before Brunswick regained his services halfway through the 1957 VFA season.

Seymour was the inaugural captain-coach of VFA club Sunshine when they were admitted into the competition in 1959. Sunshine managed six wins, which placed them 13th on the ladder, from 16 teams. Not long into the 1960 VFA season, Seymour retired from football to open up a business. He ended up reversing his decision six weeks later and resumed his career, only to have it ended two months later when he was suspended until 1962, for his actions in a game against Yarraville. He was charged with treading on an opponent, misconduct against an umpire and three separate striking charges.

In 1962 he was back at Brunswick, but before the season began was de-registered by the VFA, as he was again due to face the tribunal, for disputing an umpires decision and using abusive language, in a practice match.

Over the course of his career in the VFA, Seymour was suspended for a total of 40 weeks.

== Swimming ==
Seymour was also a competitive swimmer. In 1948 he unofficially equalled the Australian record for the 110-yard (100 m) breaststroke during a trial swim. He also held the Victorian state record in the 100 yard breast stroke.

His son, Ross Seymour, was an accomplished swimmer, who represented Australia at the 1976 Summer Olympics in Montreal.

== Death ==
Seymour died on 27 March 1993, at the age of 62.
