= John Ibrahim (footballer) =

Australian rules footballer

Personal information
- Full name: John Ibrahim
- Born: 8 January 1944
- Died: 6 September 2023 (aged 79)
- Original team: Ivanhoe Amateurs
- Height: 178 cm (5 ft 10 in)
- Weight: 76 kg (168 lb)
- Position: Forward / Centre / Back

Playing career^{1}
| Years | Club | Games (Goals) |
| 1962–68 | North Melbourne | 85 (50) |
- ^{1} Playing statistics correct to the end of 1968.

John Ibrahim (8 January 1944 – 6 September 2023) was an Australian rules footballer who played with North Melbourne in the Victorian Football League (VFL). He was captain-coach of Sunshine in the 1970 VFA season.
