= Ray Harvey (footballer) =

Australian rules footballer

Personal information
- Born: 28 July 1929; Prahran
- Died: 17 September 2003 (aged 74); Taunton Avenue
- Height: 5.4
- Weight: 70 kg (154 lb)
- Position: Rover

Playing career^{1}
Years	Club	Games (Goals)
1949	Melbourne	2 (3)
- ^{1} Playing statistics correct to the end of 1949.

Ray Harvey (28 July 1929 – 17 September 2003) was an Australian rules footballer who played with Melbourne in the Victorian Football League (VFL).

Harvey won the best and fairest award in the Melbourne thirds (junior) team in 1948. He only played two games in 1949, kicking two goals in his debut match, before requesting a transfer to Prahran Football Club in the Victorian Football Association.

Harvey played his first 142 games consecutively and won four Prahran best and fairest awards.

In 2003, he was selected in Prahran's Team of the Century.
