= Gaelic ball =

Leather football used in Gaelic football

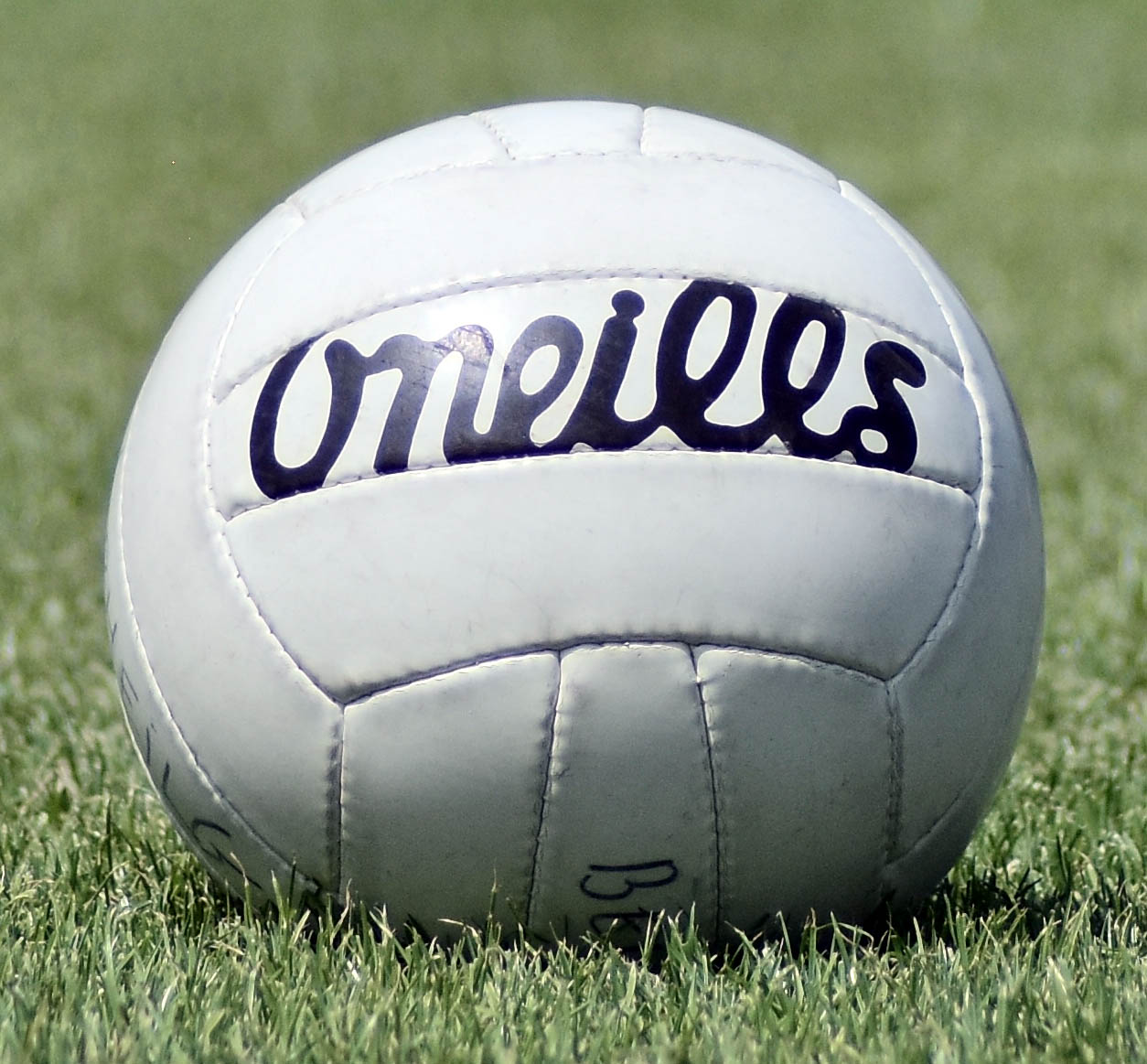
A Gaelic ball made by O'Neills

A Gaelic ball (Irish: liathróid peile) is the spherical leather football used in the sports of Gaelic football and ladies' Gaelic football and international rules football.

The pattern of panels consists of six groups perpendicular to each other, each group being composed of two trapezoidal panels and one rectangular panel; 18 panels in all.

== Rules ==
=== Gaelic football ===
The football is required to weigh 480–500 grams (1.05–1.1 pounds) and have a circumference of 68–70 cm (2 ft ~3 in); therefore, a diameter of about 22 cm (9 in). Smaller balls can be used in under-15 or younger grades. In addition, balls are approved by The Central Competitions Controls Committee "on the basis of compliance with standards and tests set out by The Central Competitions Controls Committee". Footballs shall fully comply with the Playing Gear and Equipment regulations as ratified from time to time by Central Council." Footballs are pumped to 9.75–10 psi (67–69 kPa).

The Central Competitions Controls Committee have approved two "Match Footballs" to date.

The first Officially Licensed Ball was the iconic O'Neills Football which has been widely used in the sport since the 1960s. In 2015, The Central Competitions Controls Committee approved the MD Sports Match Football. The most recently approved ball is produced by the Myclubshop.ie company, owned by long-standing GAA patron Martin Donnelly.

=== Ladies' Gaelic football ===
In ladies' Gaelic football, a size 4 football is used in all grades of competition from under-12 upwards. A size 3 or Go Games football is used in younger age groups.

== History ==
Early rules did not precisely define the football, and the ball used was the same as that used in association football (soccer).

The first distinctive Gaelic footballs were offered for sale in Dublin in 1886. Leather balls quickly became soggy and misshapen until water-resistant coatings were added.

== See also ==
- Sliotar
- Football (ball)
