= International rules football =

Hybrid team sport between Australian rules and Gaelic football

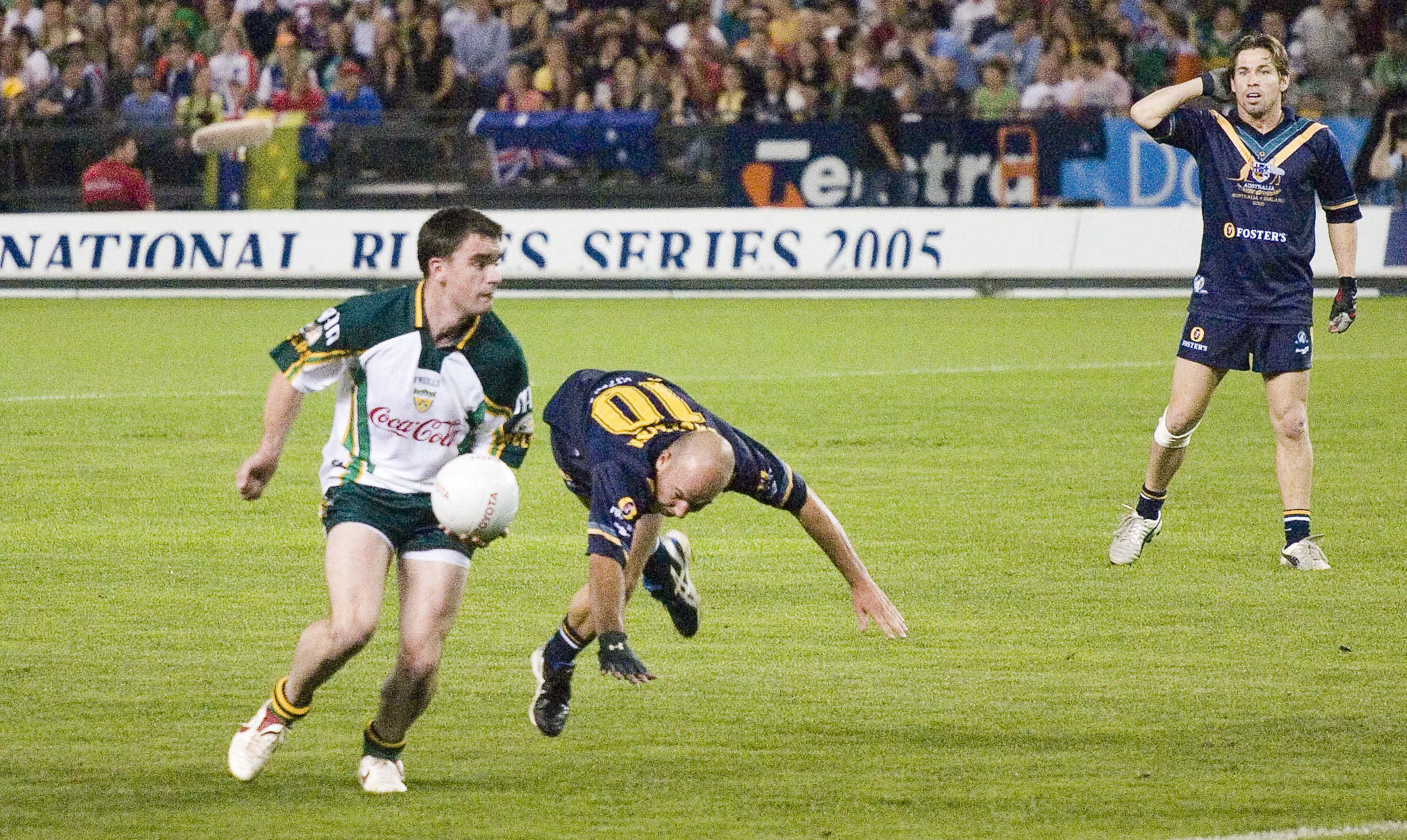
- An international rules football match at the Docklands Stadium in Melbourne, Victoria, Australia, between Australia and Ireland
- Highest governing body: Australian Football League; Gaelic Athletic Association
- Nicknames: IR, International rules, Compromise rules
- First played: 1967 (Australian Football World Tour)

Characteristics
- Contact: Yes
- Team members: 15
- Mixed-sex: Single (male only at elite level)
- Type: Outdoor
- Equipment: Gaelic football

Presence
- Olympic: No
- Paralympic: No

International rules football (Irish: Peil na rialacha idirnáisiunta; also known as international rules in Australia and compromise rules or Aussie rules in Ireland) is a team sport consisting of a hybrid of football codes, which was developed to facilitate international representative matches between Australian rules football players and Gaelic football players.

The first tour, known as the Australian Football World Tour, took place in 1967, with matches played in Ireland, the United Kingdom, and the United States. The following year, games were played between Australia and a touring County Meath Gaelic football team, Meath being the reigning All-Ireland senior football champions. Following intermittent international tests between Australia and Ireland, the International Rules Series between the senior Australia international rules football team and Ireland international rules football team has been played intermittently since 1984, and has generally been a closely matched contest. The sport has raised interest and exposure in developing markets for Gaelic and Australian football and has been considered a development tool by governing bodies of both codes, particularly by the AFL Commission.

International rules football does not have any dedicated clubs or leagues. It is currently played by men's, women's, and junior teams only in tournaments or Test matches. The University of Birmingham in the United Kingdom holds an annual International Rules tournament between its Australian Rules and Gaelic Football teams.

== Rules ==
=== Overview ===
International rules football field

The rules are designed to provide a compromise or combine between those of the two codes, with Gaelic football players being advantaged by the use of a round ball and a rectangular field measured about 145 m (159 yards) long by 90 m (98 yards) wide (Australian rules uses an oval ball and field), while the Australian rules football players benefit from the opportunity to tackle by grabbing between the shoulders and thighs and pulling to the ground, something banned in Gaelic football. The game also introduces the concept of the mark, from Australian rules football, with a free kick awarded for a ball caught from a kick of over 15 metres (16 yd), where the kick must be in the forward direction if originating from a teammate.

A player must bounce, solo (kick into one's own hands) or touch the ball on the ground once every 10 metres (11 yd) or six steps. A maximum of two bounces per possession are allowed, while players can solo the ball as often as they wish on a possession. Unlike in Gaelic football, the ball may be lifted directly off the ground, without putting a foot underneath it first. Players however cannot scoop the ball off the ground to a team-mate, nor pick up the ball if they are on their knees or on the ground. If a foul is committed, a free kick will be awarded, though referees (called umpires in Australian Rules) can give the fouled player advantage to play on at their discretion.

Scoring in International rules football

The game uses two large posts usually set 6.4 metres (7 yd) apart, and connected 2.5 metres (2.7 yd) above the ground by a crossbar with a goal net that could extend behind the goalposts and attached to the crossbar and lower goalposts, as in Gaelic football. A further 6.4 metres (7 yd) apart on either side of those and not connected by a crossbar are 2 small posts, known as behind posts, as in Australian rules football.

Points are scored as follows:

- Under the crossbar and into the goal net (a goal): 6 points, umpire waves a green flag and raises both index fingers.
- Over the crossbar and between the two large posts (an over): 3 points, umpire waves red flag and raises one arm above his head.
- Between either of the large posts and small posts (a behind): 1 point, umpire waves white flag and raises one index finger.

Scores are written so as to clarify how many of each type of score were made as well as, like Australian football, giving the total points score for each team; for example, if a team scores one goal, four overs and 10 behinds, the score is written as 1–4–10 (28), meaning one goal (six points) plus 4 overs (4 × 3 = 12 points) plus 10 behinds (10 × 1 = 10 points), for a total score of 28 points.

An international rules match lasts for 72 minutes (divided into four quarters of 18 minutes each). Inter-county Gaelic football matches go on for 70 minutes, divided into two halves, while Australian rules matches consist of four 20-minute quarters of game time (although with the addition of stoppage time, most quarters actually last around 30 minutes).

As in Gaelic football, teams consist of fifteen players, including a goalkeeper, whereas eighteen are used in Australian rules (with no keeper).

=== Alterations ===
A number of rule changes were introduced before the 2006 International Rules Series:

- Match time reduced from 80 minutes to 72 minutes. Time per quarter was reduced from 20 minutes to 18 minutes.
- A player who received a red card is to be sent off, and no replacement is allowed; in addition to this, a penalty is awarded regardless of where the incident takes place. (Previously, a replacement was allowed and a penalty was only awarded if the incident happened in the penalty area.)
- A yellow card now means a 15-minute sin bin for the offending player, who will be sent off if he receives a second card.

Further alterations were made before the 2008 International Rules Series:

- Maximum of 10 interchanges per quarter.
- Teams are allowed only four consecutive hand passes (ball must then be kicked).
- The goalkeeper can no longer kick the ball to himself from the kick-out.
- Suspensions may carry over to GAA and AFL matches if the Match Review Panel sees fit.
- A dangerous "slinging" tackle will be an automatic red card.
- A front-on bump (known as a shirtfront in Australian football) endangering the head will result in a red card.
- Physical intimidation can result in a yellow card.
- The keeper cannot be tackled or touched when the keeper is charging.
- An independent referee can cite players for reportable offences from the stands.
- Yellow card sin bin reduced to 10 minutes.

The most recent changes were made ahead of the 2014 International Rules Series:

- Maximum number of interchanges per quarter increased from 10 to 16.
- Unlimited number of interchanges allowed at quarter and half time breaks.
- Number of consecutive hand-passes teams are allowed increased from 4 to 6.
- Marks will not be paid for backwards kicks caught by a teammate.
- Goalkeepers required to kick the ball out beyond the 45 m line after all wides, behinds and overs.
- Failure of a goalkeeper to kick over the 45 m line will result in a free kick to the opposition (from the 45 m line).

== Around the world ==
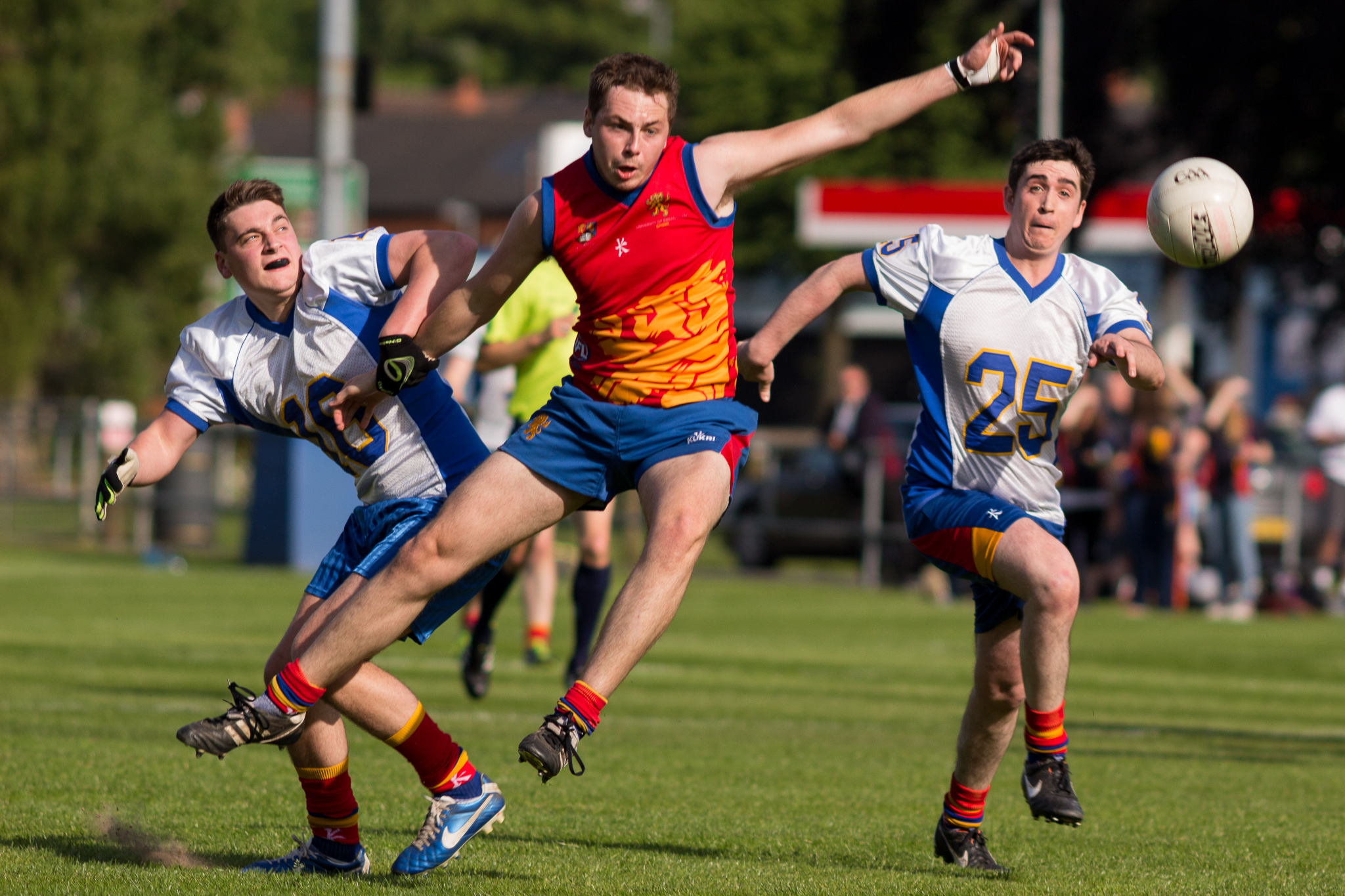
The June 2014 International Rules match at the University of Birmingham

International rules has been played in various locations throughout North America and the Caribbean, Europe, Asia, and Australia and New Zealand between fledgling Australian rules football and Gaelic football clubs.

In 2006, an exhibition match between South African youth teams and an Indigenous Australian touring side composed of players from the Clontarf Foundation, led by Sydney's Adam Goodes, was held at Potchefstroom.

The University of Birmingham holds an annual International Rules match between its Australian Rules football team and its Gaelic Football team, with the 2013 edition won by the Australian Rules team 56–55, before a crowd of over 400 students.

In the International Rules Series, the most well-known International Rules event, Australia and Ireland are at an impasse, with 10 series wins apiece. Most recently in 2017, Australia defeated Ireland with two Test wins and an aggregate score of 116–103.

=== Amateur tours ===
The Australian Amateur Football Council has sent an amateur Under-23 All-Australian team to Ireland in both 2005 and 2008. The Australian amateur team wore a different jersey to the AFL representative side, dark green and gold, with a kangaroo emblem. Recently, the Victorian Amateur Football Association (VAFA) has sent a squad of players sourced from the top six divisions of its competition to tour Ireland and play various clubs and representative teams.

So-called "masters" series featuring teams made up of players aged 40 and above; meanwhile, Ladies' series, unsanctioned by the AFL and GAA, have sporadically been played. In 2024, an over-40 men's, over-50 men's and over-40 women's series was played in and won comprehensively by Ireland, and the series featured former AFL player Jason Akermanis as head coach of one of the Australian teams.

Amateur matches
Date	Teams	Stadium	Location	Attendance	Notes
2005	AAFC (U-23) 17 def. by Ireland GAA 105	Croke Park	Dublin, County Dublin	N/A	
2005	AAFC (U-23) 30 def. by All-Ireland Universities 34	University Grounds	National University of Ireland, Galway	N/A	
2005	AAFC (U-23) 74 def. Irish Banks/Allied Forces 52	Pearse Stadium	Galway, County Galway	N/A	
2005	AAFC (U-23) 53 def. Bishopstown GAA 47	Bishopstown GAA Club	Cork, County Cork	N/A	
2008	AAFC (U-23) 46 def. Bishopstown GAA 39	Bishopstown GAA Club	Cork, County Cork		
2008	AAFC (U-23) 55 def. by Donaghmore Ashbourne 60	Killegland West	Ashbourne, County Meath	2,500	
2008	Sydney AFL 43 def. NSW GAA 42	Mahoney Park	Marrickville, New South Wales		
2011	VAFA 28 def. Donaghmore Ashbourne 26	Killegland West	Ashbourne, County Meath		
2011	VAFA 7 def. by Ireland GAA 81	Croke Park	Dublin, County Dublin		
2013	VAFA 102 def. Na Piarsaigh 16	Páirc Uí Chonaire	Cork City, County Cork		
2013	VAFA 0.10.9 (39) def. by Combined Dublin Universities 4.10.3 (57)	St Vincent's GAA Club	Marino, Dublin, County Dublin		

== See also ==
- AFLX
- Comparison of Gaelic football and Australian rules football
- International Rules Series
- List of International Rules Series results
