= Max Papley =

Australian rules footballer and coach

Personal information
- Full name: Maxwell William Papley
- Born: 31 July 1940 (age 86)
- Original team: Moorabbin (VFA)
- Height: 179 cm (5 ft 10 in)
- Weight: 83 kg (183 lb)

Playing career^{1}
Years	Club	Games (Goals)
1964–1967	South Melbourne	59 (66)
- ^{1} Playing statistics correct to the end of 1967.

Career highlights
- South Melbourne leading goalkicker 1964; South Melbourne best and fairest 1966

Maxwell William Papley OAM (born 31 July 1940) is a former Australian rules footballer who represented South Melbourne in the Victorian Football League (VFL) and Moorabbin and Williamstown in the Victorian Football Association (VFA) during the 1950s and 1960s.

== Early life and career ==
Papley grew up supporting South Melbourne and attended South Melbourne Technical School, the same school as his hero, the legendary Bob Skilton. Papley began playing football for the Melbourne Fourths, and was told by his coach that he was too small. He then went to play with Port Melbourne YMCA before his family moved to Moorabbin, and there he joined the local Moorabbin Football Club, which was competing in the Victorian Football Association (VFA).

Despite standing only 179 centimetres, Papley quickly built a reputation as a full-forward and as one of the star players of the VFA. At the age of 23, he captained Moorabbin to the 1963 VFA premiership and kicked six goals in the grand final. He played 96 senior games over five seasons for Moorabbin.

In February 1964, Papley was cleared to South Melbourne, a couple of months prior to the events which saw Moorabbin expelled from the VFA. He had signed a form with South before his parents relocated to Moorabbin, and much as he loved playing for Moorabbin, Papley was happy to have a boyhood dream come true. He played as a half forward and centreman during his time at South Melbourne, winning their 1966 best and fairest award and representing Victoria in interstate football over four seasons with South Melbourne.

But again Papley's football career would take an unexpected turn. Although Papley enjoyed football and was clearly talented enough to become a star, he also enjoyed playing cricket, and was captain-coach of Moorabbin Cricket Club in the sub-district competition. Papley had made it clear to South Melbourne that he would continue playing as long as it did not interfere with his cricket commitments.

In February before the start of the 1968 VFL season, while Papley was working in the chemical industry with clients in Williamstown, he got to know the president of the Williamstown Football Club. He told Papley that the club's coach had just retired and wondered if Papley would consider taking on the job.

Papley told South about the offer and, because the club would not relent over the cricketing issue, he moved to Williamstown without a clearance and took up the job as captain-coach. Papley led the club to grand finals in his first three seasons, and winning the 1969 premiership in the VFA second division despite having suffered bruised ribs in a car accident in the previous week. He retired from playing after the 1970 season due to hamstring injuries, but remained as coach until 1972 – although he did return to the field for a few games in 1972. Papley played 54 games for the Seagulls, and kicked 108 goals, and his contribution was recognized with selection in Williamstown's official 'Team of the Century' in 2003 as centreman.

Papley captained the VFA representative team against Tasmania in one match in June 1968; it was the VFA's last representative match during Papley's career.

== After football ==
After finishing at Williamstown, Papley moved with his family to Bunyip, where he has lived since.

== Personal life ==
Papley is married to Laraine. They have four children, Cathy, Vicki, David and Karen, 12 grandchildren and one great-granddaughter. Three of his grandsons have played in the AFL, Ben Ross (North Melbourne and Hawthorn), Michael Ross (Essendon) and Tom Papley (Sydney).
