= Kevin Jackman =

Australian rules footballer

Personal information
- Full name: Kevin Jackman
- Born: 30 June 1945 (age 81)
- Original team: Seddon
- Height: 175 cm (5 ft 9 in)
- Weight: 73 kg (161 lb)

Playing career^{1}
Years	Club	Games (Goals)
1965–1968	Footscray	33 (36)
- ^{1} Playing statistics correct to the end of 1968.

Kevin Jackman (born 30 June 1945) is a former Australian rules footballer who played with Footscray in the Victorian Football League (VFL).

Recruited locally from Seddon, Jackman was a left-footed rover. He won the Gardiner Medal in 1965, for his performances in the VFL reserves competition. The following year he was one of only two Footscray players to appear in all 18 home and away games and his 28 goals was enough to win his club's 1966 leading goal-kicker award.

Jackman was a member of Williamstown's 1969 premiership team.
