= Australian Amateur Football Council =

The Australian Amateur Football Council (AAFC) is the governing body of amateur Australian football in the states of Victoria, South Australia, and Tasmania in Australia. The council was formed in 1933.

== Overview ==
The council organises amateur interstate and international representative matches, and is responsible for several amateur leagues, including the Victorian Amateur Football Association, South Australian Amateur Football League and Western Australian Amateur Football League.

Not all Australian amateur leagues are represented: the Northern Tasmanian Football Association has been a member in the past and a U23 All-Australian team played an open Tasmanian team in 2007. The Top End Australian Football Association, AFLQ State Association and Sydney AFL are not members of the AAFC, as these leagues do not follow as strict criteria of "amateur".

The AAFC was represented by a voting delegate on the Australian National Football Council from 1949 until the ANFC's dissolution in 1995. This gave the AAFC an equal voice in national administration of the game alongside major state leagues like the Victorian Football League and South Australian National Football League, and entitled the amateurs to send teams to compete in interstate carnivals.

Although its position on the ANFC nominally meant the amateurs were required to play under the national Laws of Australian Football, the amateurs have played with minor differences in the rules: most notably, the amateurs have had an order-off rule since the 1930s, and presently use a 25-metre penalty instead of the 50-metre penalty used in professional leagues.

Player transfer rules also differ: while players are required to sign transfers when switching between professional leagues, they do not need to do so for amateur leagues affiliated with the AAFC; however, during player registration, most leagues affiliated with the AAFC request statements of a clean history (no major reports or lifetime bans) and that they are not being paid to play elsewhere.

The AAFC's international tours have included under 17 AAFC tours to Ireland to play International Rules Football against Gaelic Athletic Associations.
