= George Allen (footballer, born 1948) =

Australian rules footballer

Personal information
- Full name: George Leslie Allen
- Born: 13 May 1948
- Died: 21 March 1971 (aged 22); Benalla, Victoria
- Original team: Sunshine YCW
- Position: Full forward

Playing career^{1}
Years	Club	Games (Goals)
1967–1970	Sunshine	49 (214)
- ^{1} Playing statistics correct to the end of 1970.

George Leslie Allen (13 May 1948 – 21 March 1971) was an Australian rules footballer who played with Sunshine in the Victorian Football Association. He was a prolific goalkicker during his brief career, but he died suddenly during a preseason game at the age of 22.

Allen played his entire career with the Sunshine Football Club in the VFA. After playing some Under-16s football with the club from as early as 1961, he became a permanent member of the club's Thirds (Under-19s) team in 1966, where he kicked 98 goals to be the VFA Thirds Division 2 leading goalkicker. The following year, aged 18, he played for the Seconds, and was again the VFA's Division 2 leading goalkicker.

He played his first two senior games for Sunshine in 1967, and another eight games in 1968, before becoming a permanent member of the senior team in 1969. He immediately established himself as one of the Association's best full forwards, and he was the VFA's Division 2 leading goalkicker in each of 1969 and 1970, kicking 99 and 80 goals respectively – to give him a total of four leading goalkicker awards, across different grades, in just five seasons. In his senior career, he played 49 games and kicked 214 goals.

On Sunday 21 March, late in the first quarter of a pre-season practice match between Sunshine and Benalla in Benalla, Allen suddenly collapsed and died on the field. He had crashed heavily to the ground on his side in a marking contest a few minutes earlier, but had returned to full forward and shown no ill-effects from the contest until his collapse. He was 22 years old.

Outside football, Allen worked in the Newport Workshops.
