= Prahran Football Club =

Names
- Full name: Prahran Football Club Inc (Note: Prahran's registered name with the VAFA is "Southbank Amateur Football Club".)
- Former name: Prahran Assumption Football Club
- Nickname: Two Blues
- Club song: "Here come Prahran boys" (Notre Dame March)

Club details
- Founded: 1886, re-formed 1899; 127 years ago
- Colours
- Competition: Victorian Amateur Football Association
- Coach: Craige Milward
- Premierships: VAFA (3): 2011; 2017; 2024; VFA Div 1 (5): 1937; 1951; 1970; 1973; 1978; VFA Div 2 (2): 1966; 1987
- Ground: Toorak Park (capacity: 15,000)
- Training ground: DW Lucas Oval

Uniforms
Home	Clash	Former

The Prahran Football Club (IPA: /prəˈræn/), nicknamed the Two Blues, is an Australian rules football club based in the Melbourne suburb of Armadale. It has played at Toorak Park since 1899.

As of 2025, the club competes Premier C division of the Victorian Amateur Football Association (VAFA).

== History ==
=== VFA ===
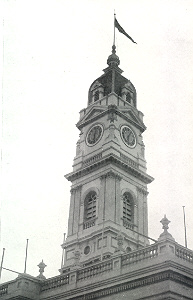
The VFA premiership flag flies above Prahran Town Hall in celebration of the Prahran Football Club's Grand Final victory, 1951

Prahran Football Club was formed at a meeting at Prahran Court House on 20 March 1886. The club was admitted to the Victorian Football Association (VFA) in 1886 playing its home games at the Warehouseman's Cricket Ground. In 1887, it moved to nearby Wesley College Ground. After the 1887 season, the VFA reduced the number of clubs and Prahran amalgamated with the neighbouring St Kilda Football Club, which was based less than a mile away.

Prahran was reformed as a club on 15 March 1899, and rejoined the VFA that season, this time playing at Toorak Park, approximately two miles from St Kilda. It played in the VFA between 1899 and 1994, with the exception of 1959 when it competed in the Metropolitan Football League (MFL) because the Prahran City Council would not lease Toorak Park to Prahran's reserves team, leaving the club expelled from the Association's requirements for failing to meet its minimum home ground requirements.

At the end of 1994, when administration of the VFA was turned over to the Victorian State Football League, Prahran left the Association as part of the VSFL's efforts to reduce the size of the VFA and align it with the TAC Cup.

Although Prahran's identity was carried on within the TAC Cup from 1995, when the Central Dragons club moved to Toorak Park and were renamed the Prahran Dragons (a name it carried until the end of 1999), there was no affiliation with Prahran Football Club.

=== VAFA ===
The club continued to exist in an administrative capacity after its departure from the VFA, and continued to operate the Prahran Tabaret – a gambling bar it owns and operates in Chapel Street, Prahran – despite having no on-field presence. Following the 1998 VAFA season, the club merged with Southbank Football Club and joined the Victorian Amateur Football Association (VAFA) under the stewardship of Herald Sun racing writer Tim Habel. It also re-established its junior arm, and, after commencing with just two junior teams, the club now has eight junior teams and has formed a joint under-19s team with Caulfield Football Club.

In 2010, a joint venture with Assumption College was approved, and in 2011 the club changed its name to Prahran/Assumption Football Club.

The club won 2 premierships in 2011 and 2017 as Prahran Assumption, before reverting to the "Prahran" moniker in 2023. Prahran returns to Premier C Section in 2025 after a dominant season in 2024 culminated in another premiership.

== Honours ==
=== Premierships ===
Division	Level	Wins	Years won
Victorian Amateur Football Association	Seniors (Division 1)	1	2024
Victorian Amateur Football Association	Seniors (Division 2)	1	2017
Victorian Amateur Football Association	Seniors (Division 3)	1	2011
Victorian Football Association	Seniors (Division 1)	5	1937, 1951, 1970, 1973, 1978
Victorian Football Association	Seniors (Division 2)	2	1966, 1987
VFA/VFL Reserves	Division 1	2	1946, 1991
VFA/VFL Reserves	Division 2	1	1965
VFA/VFL Thirds	Division 1	2	1970, 1972
VFA/VFL Thirds	Division 2	1	1964
Metropolitan Football League	Seniors	1	1959

=== VFA best and fairest awards ===
- VFA - Recorder Cup
  - 1928 - Frank Smith
  - 1931 - Bill Koop
  - 1935 - Les White
- VFA - J J Liston Trophy
  - 1993 - Michael Sinni

=== Club champions/best and fairest ===
- 1904 – George Brown (best all-round)
- 1940 – Bill Faul
- 1945 – A Gardiner
- 1952 – Ian Armstrong

=== Team of the Century ===
- Back: Vin Crowe, Kerry Foley, Robert Anderson
- Half back: Bill Faul, Dick Culpin, Ian McGuiness
- Centre: Frank Smith, Pat Walsh (c), Ken Emselle
- Half forward: Wayne Johnston, Bill Morrow, Glenn Dickson
- Forward: Barry Pearson, George Hawkins, Les White
- Follower: Rod Payne, Kevin Rose, Ray Harvey (vc)
- Interchange: Kim Smith, Bill Koop, Graeme McMahon, John Townsend, Ross Thornton, Michael Sinni.
- Coach: Kevin Rose

Selected in 2003 by - Jack Morgans, Ray Harvey, Charlie Roach and Ray Ryan.

== VFL/AFL players ==
The following well known footballers played with Prahran FC prior to making their senior VFL/AFL debut. View the complete list at the bottom of this page under "Prahran Football Club Players".

- 1941 - Harold Bray – finished in the top three in the Brownlow Medal three times
- 1967 - Kevin Sheedy – former coach of Essendon Football Club and former Richmond player, began his football career with Prahran.
- 1979 - Wayne Johnston – went on to play in four Premierships for Carlton Football Club
- 1980 - Ross Thornton – went onto to play for Fitzroy Football Club
- 1984 - Graeme Yeats – went on to play 182 games for Melbourne Football Club
- 1987 - Jim Stynes – won a Brownlow Medal and went on to set an Australian Football League record for most consecutive games (244) for Melbourne Football Club

The following footballers played with Prahran FC after playing senior VFL / AFL football, with the year indicating their first season with Prahran.

- 1951 - Don Chipp – Australian Federal politician. A former Liberal Minister in the Australian government and inaugural leader of the Australian Democrats political party. Played in the club's 1951 VFA Premiership team.
- 1978 - Sam Kekovich – North Melbourne Premiership player and well known football identity.
- 1991 - Brian Taylor
- 2001 - Tony Free – player-coach in 2001 and 2002 after retiring from an illustrious career with the Richmond Football Club including being Captain of the Tigers.

Thomas Anthony McLaughlin. Born Belfast, travelled to Australia to complete his professional Football career playing for Prahran 1963-1965
