= Bell (surname) =

Bell is a surname common in English speaking countries with several word-origins.

The surname is derived from the Middle English bell. This surname likely originated as an occupational name for a bell ringer or bell maker; or else from a topographic name for someone who lived by an actual bell, or by a house sign or inn sign. In other cases, the surname Bell is derived from the mediaeval personal name Bel. The masculine form of this personal name is derived from the Old French beu, bel ("handsome"); the feminine form of the name represents a short form of Isobel. In some cases, the surname originates from a nickname, or descriptive name, derived from the Old French bel ("beautiful", "fair"). (Note: The surname Bell, when found in Kintyre and Islay, is said to represent this Gaelic surname because a man bearing the Gaelic name married a woman of the English name. The explanation runs: since the woman held property, the man changed his surname to Bell, but was still known in Gaelic by his original name.) In some cases, the surname is derived from placenames in Norway (Bell) and Germany (Bell in Rhineland; and possibly Belle, in Westphalia). The surname Bell is also sometimes an Anglicized form of the German Böhl or Böll.

Early attested forms of the surname when of a patronymic origin include: Ailuuardus "filius Belli", in 1086; Ricardus "filius Bell", in 1279; and Osbertus "filius Belle", in 1297. Early attested forms of the surname, when originating from an occupational name include: Seaman "Belle", in 1181–1187; and Serlo "Belle", in 1190. An early attested form of the surname when originating from someone who lived near a sign of a bell is: John "atte Belle", in 1332. Early attested forms of the surname when originating from nickname include: Hugo "bel" in 1148; and Robertus "bellus", and Robert "le bel", both in 1186–1200. Today the surname Bell can be found in many parts of the world. It is the 76th most popular surname in the United States and the 36th most common surname in Scotland.

== A ==
- Aaron Bell (musician) (1922–2003), American musician
- Aaron Bell (politician) (born 1980), British Conservative politician
- Acton Bell, pseudonym of Anne Brontë
- Adino Nye Bell (1866–1956), American politician
- Adolphus Bell (1944–2013), American musician
- Adrian Bell (1901–1980), English journalist and farmer; father of Martin Bell
- Al Bell (born 1940), American musical artist and executive
- Alden John Bell (1904–1982), Roman Catholic bishop
- Alexander Graham Bell (1847–1922), Scottish-Canadian-American inventor, teacher, engineer, and scientist, son of Alexander Melville Bell
- Alexander Melville Bell (1819–1905), Scottish-American philologist, researcher and teacher, father of Alexander Graham Bell
- Alexandra Bell (artist) (born 1983), American artist
- Alexandra Bell (athlete) (born 1992), British middle-distance runner
- Alison Bell (disambiguation), 7 people including
  - Alison Bell (actress) (born 1978), Australian actress
- Allan Bell (born 1947), Manx politician, Chief Minister of the Isle of Man
- Allan Bell (sociolinguist) (born 1947), New Zealand sociolinguist
- Allan Gordon Bell (born 1953), Canadian contemporary classical composer
- Alphonzo E. Bell Sr. (1875–1947), American oil millionaire; father of Alphonzo E. Bell Jr.
- Alphonzo E. Bell Jr. (1914–2004), American politician
- Amanda Bell (born 1988), American Mixed Martial Artist
- Amari'i Bell (born 1994), footballer
- Amir Bell (born 1996), American basketball player in the Israel Basketball Premier League
- Andi Bell (born 1972), British Memory champion
- Andrew Bell (disambiguation), 9 people, including:
  - Andrew Bell (engraver) (1726–1809), Scottish co-founder of the Encyclopædia Britannica
  - Andrew Bell (educationalist) (1753–1832), Scottish pioneer of mutual instruction and author of the Madras System of Education
  - Andrew Bell (judge) (born 1966), Australian judge
- Andy Bell (disambiguation), 9 people, including:
  - Andy Bell (freestyle motocross rider) (born 1975), freestyle motocross rider
  - Andy Bell (musician) (born 1970), guitarist with Ride, Hurricane #1 and bassist with Oasis
  - Andy Bell (singer) (born 1964), singer with synth pop band Erasure
- Angellica Bell (born 1976), English television and radio presenter
- Anthea Bell (1936–2018), English translator of literary works including Asterix
- Anthony Bell (American football) (born 1964), Retired American gridiron football player
- Anthony Bell (director) (born 1970), American animator, film director and screenwriter
- Aran Bell (born 1998) American ballet dancer
- Archie Bell (singer) (born 1944), American musician
- Arthur Bell (disambiguation), 11 people, including:
  - Art Bell (1945–2018), American broadcaster and author
  - Arthur Hornbui Bell (1891–1973), Grand Dragon of the Ku Klux Klan in New Jersey
  - Arthur Bell (engineer) (1856–1943), New Zealand engineer
  - Arthur Bell (journalist) (1939–1984), American journalist, author and LGBT rights activist

=== See also ===
- Alexandra Bell (disambiguation) (2 people)

== B ==
- Beau Bell (1907–1977), American baseball player
- Beau Bell (American football), (born 1986), American gridiron football player
- Ben Bell, New Zealand politician
- Benny Bell (1906–1999), American singer-songwriter
- Bert Bell (1895–1959), American football player, coach, and executive
- Billy Bell (disambiguation), 15 people including:
  - Bill Bell (mayor) (born 1941), American politician
  - Bill Bell (American football) (1947–2022), American gridiron football player
  - Bill Bell (businessman) (1932–2013), English football chairman
  - Billy Bell (ice hockey) (1891–1952), Canadian ice hockey player
  - Billy Bell (politician) (1935–2020), British politician
- Bob Bell (disambiguation), multiple people
- Bobby Bell (born 1940), American footballer
- Bradley Bell (born 1964), American television writer and producer
- Brenda Bell (1891–1979), pioneer amateur radio operator from New Zealand
- Brendan Bell (disambiguation), multiple people, including:
  - Brendan Bell (ice hockey) (born 1983), Canadian ice hockey defenceman
  - Brendan Bell (politician) (born 1971), Canadian territorial level politician and former cabinet minister
  - Brendan Bell (footballer) (1910–?), Scottish footballer
- Brian Bell (disambiguation), multiple people, including:
  - Brian Bell (born 1968), American musician
  - Brian Bell (American football) (born 1984), American football fullback
  - Brian Bell (basketball) (born 1989), American wheelchair basketball player
  - Brian Bell (businessman) (1928–2010), Australian-born businessman in Papua New Guinea
  - Brian Douglas Bell (1930–2016), New Zealand ornithologist
  - Brian Murray (actor) (1937–2018), South African actor born Brian Bell
- Buddy Bell (born 1951), American baseball player
- Burton C. Bell (born 1969), American rock singer

=== See also ===
- Beau Bell (disambiguation)

== C ==
- Cammy Bell (born 1986), Scottish international football goalkeeper
- Carey Bell (1936–2007), American blues harpist
- Caroline M. Bell (1874–1970), American artist
- Caroline Bell, professor of psychological medicine in New Zealand
- Catherine Bell (actress) (born 1968), British-American actress
- Catherine J. Bell (born 1954), Canadian politician
- Charles Bell (1774–1842), Scottish surgeon
- Charles Bell (disambiguation), multiple people, including:
  - Charles Bell (surveyor) (1813–1882), Scottish surveyor, general, artist, and designer
  - Charles Bell (painter), (1935–1995), American Photorealist who created large scale still lifes.
  - Charles H. Bell (politician) (1823–1893), American politician
  - Charles H. Bell (naval officer) (1798–1875), United States naval officer
  - Charlie Bell (baseball) (1868–1937), Major League Baseball pitcher
  - Charlie Bell (businessman) (c. 1960 – 2005), Australian businessman
  - Charlie Bell (basketball) (born 1979), United States basketball player
- Chichester A. Bell, American sound engineer
- Chris Bell (disambiguation), multiple people, including:
  - Chris Bell (American musician) (1951–1978), American musician
  - Chris Bell (director) (born 1972), American director, producer and writer
  - Chris Bell (politician) (born 1959), American politician
  - Christopher Bell (racing driver) (born 1994), American racing driver
- Clive Bell (1881–1964), British art critic and philosopher
- Coby Bell (born 1975), American actor and producer
- Connor Bell, multiple people, including:
  - Connor Bell (footballer) (born 1996), English footballer
  - Connor Bell (athlete) (born 2001), New Zealand athlete
  - Connor Bell (racing driver), Canadian racing driver
- Colin Bell, multiple people
- Cool Papa Bell, American baseball player
- Currer Bell, pseudonym of Charlotte Brontë

== D ==
- Daniel Bell (1919–2011), American sociologist
- Danielle Bell, American politician
- Danna C. Bell, American archivist and librarian
- D'Anthony Bell (born 1996), American football player
- David Bell (disambiguation), multiple people, including:
  - David Bell (baseball) (born 1972), American baseball player
  - David Bell (basketball) (born 1981), American basketball player
  - David Bell (television) (1936–1990), Scottish TV producer and director
  - David Bell (field hockey player), Australian field hockey player
  - David Bell (footballer, born 1984) (born 1984), English-born Irish footballer
  - David Bell (footballer, born 1985) (born 1985), Irish footballer
  - David Bell (VC), Irish soldier
  - David A. Bell (born 1961), historian
  - David Robert Bell (born 1959), Vice-Chancellor of the University of Reading
- Dean Bell (born 1962), New Zealand rugby league footballer and coach
- Demetress Bell (born 1984), American football offensive tackle
- Dennis Bell (disambiguation), multiple people, including:
  - Dennis Bell (Medal of Honor recipient) (1866–1953), Buffalo Soldier of the Spanish–American War
  - Dennis Bell (basketball) (born 1951), American basketball player
- Derek Bell (disambiguation), multiple people, including:
  - Derek Bell (musician) (1935–2002), harpist
  - Derek Bell (auto racer) (born 1941), British racing driver
  - Derek Bell (baseball player) (born 1968), American baseball player
- Derrick Bell, American law professor
- Diane Bell (disambiguation), multiple people
- Dillon Bell (1822–1898), New Zealand politician
- Dillon Bell (American football) (born 2003), American football player
- Don Bell (disambiguation), multiple people
- Doug Bell (game designer) (born 1961), American computer game developer
- Douglas John Bell (1893–1918), South African World War I fighter ace
- Drake Bell (born 1986), American actor and guitarist
- Drew Tyler Bell (born 1986), American actor and performer
- Duncan Bell, English rugby union player
- Duncan Bell (actor), Scottish actor

== E ==
- Earl Bell (born 1955), American pole vaulter
- Edith Anna Bell (1870–1929) Irish sculptor
- Edward Bell (disambiguation), multiple people
- Edmond Bell, English MP
- Eileen Bell (born 1943), Northern Ireland politician
- Eileen Bell (artist) (1907–2005), British artist
- Elizabeth Bell (disambiguation), multiple people, including:
  - Elizabeth Bell (doctor) (1869–1934), Ireland's first woman doctor
  - Elizabeth Bell (actress) (1941–2012), British actress who played stage and screen
  - Elizabeth Bell (composer) (1928–2016), founder of the New York Women Composers, Inc.
- Ellis Bell, pseudonym of Emily Brontë
- Emily Bell (born 1965), British journalist
- Emma Bell (born 1986), American actress
- Eric Temple Bell (1883–1960), American mathematician
- Ernest Bell (animal rights activist) (1851–1933), British author, animal rights activist, humanitarian, and vegetarian
- Ernest Bell (footballer), English footballer

== F ==
- Francis Bell (disambiguation), multiple people, including:
  - Francis Bell (actor) (1944–1994), UK-born New Zealand actor
  - Francis Bell (New Zealand politician) (1851–1936), Prime Minister of New Zealand
  - Francis Bell (engineer) (1813–1879), British railway engineer
  - Francis Campbell Bell (1892–1968), politician in Manitoba, Canada
- Frank Bell, multiple people, including:
  - Frank Bell (baseball) (1863–1891), Major League Baseball player
  - Frank T. Bell (1883–1970), U.S. Commissioner of Fish and Fisheries (1933–1939)
- Frederick William Bell (1875–1954), Australian soldier

== G ==
- Gary Bell (baseball) (born 1936), American Major League Baseball pitcher
- Gary Bell (footballer) (born 1947), English (soccer) footballer
- Geoff Bell (disambiguation), multiple people, including:
  - Geoff Bell (rugby league), Australian rugby league footballer
  - Geoff Bell (actor) (born 1963), British actor
- Geoffrey Bell (1939–2025), economist, banker
- Geoffrey Bell (cricketer) (1896–1984), English cricketer and educationalist
- George Bell (disambiguation), one of several people including
  - George Bell (Australian politician) (1872–1944), Australian politician
  - George Bell (pitcher) (1874–1941), American baseball player
  - George Bell (painter) (1878–1966), Australian painter
  - George Bell (bishop) (1883–1958), Anglican bishop of Chichester
  - George Irving Bell (1926–2000), American physicist and mountain climber
  - George Bell (outfielder) (born 1959), Dominican baseball player
- Gerald Gordon Bell (1890–1970), Canadian flying ace
- Gertrude Bell (1868–1926), British archaeologist, writer & spy
- Gladys Kathleen Bell (1882–1965), English painter
- Glen Bell, American founder of Taco Bell restaurant chain
- Gordon Bell (disambiguation), multiple people, including:
- Gordon Bell (1934–2024), computer engineer
- Gordon Bell (artist), British comic strip artist
- Gordon Bell (QNX), Canadian computer scientist
- Gordon Bell (ice hockey), ice hockey player
- Grace Alatta Bell, Member of the parliament of Bermuda
- Graeme Bell (1914–2012), Australian pianist, composer and band leader
- Graham Bell (disambiguation), multiple people, including:
  - Graham Bell (advocate), Scottish advocate
  - Graham E. Bell, American astronomer
  - Graham Bell (artist) (1910–1943), painter
  - Graham Bell (biologist) (born 1949), English academic, writer and evolutionary biologist
  - Graham Bell (footballer) (born 1955), English footballer
  - Graham Bell (police officer) (1946–2025), New Zealand police officer and television presenter.
  - Graham Bell (singer) (1948–2008), English pop and rock singer
  - Graham Bell (skier) (born 1966), Olympic skier
- Grant Bell, Australian rugby league coach
- Griffin Bell (1918–2009), American politician
- Gus Bell (1928–1995), American Baseball player

== H ==
- Harriet Bell (1923–1995), American advocate for disability rights
- Hazel K. Bell, English indexer and writer
- Heath Bell (born 1977), American baseball player
- Helen Bell, English folk musician
- Henri Lobe Bell, Duala ruler in Cameroon
- Henry Bell (disambiguation), multiple people, including:
  - Henry Bell (engineer) (1767–1830), Scottish engineer
  - Henry Glassford Bell (1803–1874), Scottish lawyer, poet and historian
  - Henry H. Bell (1808–1868), American sailor
  - Henry Lawrie Bell (1929–1984), Australian ornithologist
- Hi Bell (1897–1949), professional baseball player
- Hilari Bell (born 1958), American fantasy writer
- Hilary Bell (swimmer) (born 1991), swimmer from Canada
- Hilary Bell (television producer) (1965–2010), reality television pioneer
- Hilary Bell (writer) (born 1966), Australian writer
- Hilliard Brooke Bell (1897–1960), Canadian flying ace
- Hugh Bell (disambiguation), multiple people
- Hunter Bell, American book author

== I ==
- Ian Bell (disambiguation), multiple people, including:
  - Ian Bell (born 1982), English cricketer
  - Ian Bell (journalist) (1956–2015), Scottish journalist and writer
  - Ian Bell (literaturist) (born 1947), professor of American literature at Keele University
  - Ian Bell (musician) (born 1954), Canadian musician
  - Ian Bell (programmer) (born 1962), British computer programmer
- Isaac Lowthian Bell, British industrialist

== J ==
- J. Ernest Bell II (born 1941), American politician and lawyer
- J. Franklin Bell (1856–1919), U.S. Army Chief of Staff (1906–1910)
- Jack Bell (disambiguation), multiple people, including:
  - Jack Bell (footballer, born 1868), footballer with Everton F.C.
- Jacob Bell (disambiguation), multiple people
- Jaheim Bell (born 2001), American football player
- James Franklin Bell, US Army Major General, Medal Of Honor recipient, US Army Chief of Staff
- James Spencer-Bell (1818–1872), British politician
- Jamie Bell (born 1986), British actor
- James Bell (basketball) (born 1992), Basketball Player
- Jane Bell (disambiguation), multiple people
- Jay Bell (born 1965), American baseball player
- Jean Bell (born 1944), American model
- Jeanne Bell (1888–1978), British artist
- Jeff Bell (disambiguation), multiple people
- Jimmy Bell Jr. (born 2000), American football player
- Jocelyn Bell Burnell (born 1943), British astronomer
- Joel Bell (born 1985), professional Canadian football player
- Johann Adam Schall von Bell, German Jesuit missionary
- Johannes Bell (1868–1949), German jurist and politician
- John Bell (disambiguation), multiple people, including:
  - John Bell (bishop of Worcester) (died 1556), English clergyman
  - John Bell (New Hampshire) (1765–1836), American politician, Governor of New Hampshire
  - John Bell (Tennessee politician) (1797–1869), American politician from Tennessee
  - John Bell (explorer) (1799–1868), Canadian explorer and governor
  - John Bell (Australian actor), Australian Shakespearean actor
  - John Joy Bell (1871–1934), Scottish author
  - John L. Bell, Scottish religious figure
  - John Lane Bell, Canadian philosopher and mathematician
  - John Stewart Bell (1928–1990), British physicist originated Bell's Theorem
  - John Thomas Bell (1878–1965), British businessman, founder of Bellway home builders
  - John Bell (surgeon) (1763–1820), brother of Charles Bell (anatomist)
  - John Bell (British Army officer), Lieutenant Governor of Guernsey 1848–1854
  - John William Bell (1838–1901), Canadian political figure
  - John Bell (musician), American guitarist and singer
  - John Bell (farmer) from The Bell Witch legend
  - John Graham Bell (1812–1899), American taxidermist
  - John Howatt Bell (1846–1929), Prince Edward Island politician
  - John Irving Bell (born 1952), British–Canadian biologist
- Jon Bell (disambiguation), several people called Jonathan or Jon Bell
- Jonny Bell (rugby union), rugby union player
- Joique Bell (born 1986), American football player
- Joseph-Antoine Bell (born 1954), Cameroonian international football goalkeeper
- Joseph Bell (1837–1911), Scottish physician, pioneer of forensic diagnostics, inspiration for Sherlock Holmes
- Josh Bell (disambiguation), multiple people
- Joshua Bell (born 1967), American musician
- Joshua Peter Bell (1827–1881), Queensland Parliamentarian
- Josiah Hughes Bell (1791–1838), American pioneer
- Joyce Rockenbach Bell, American coleopterist
- Julia Bell (geneticist) (1879–1979), British geneticist
- Julian Bell (1908–1937), English poet
- Julie Bell (born 1958), American painter
- Justin Bell (born 1968), British racecar driver, son of Derek Bell

== K ==
- Kahlil Bell (born 1986), American football player
- Kathleen Bell, American physician and professor
- Katie Bell (Harry Potter), Harry Potter character
- Kay Bell (1914–1994), American football player and professional wrestler
- Keith Bell (rugby league, born 1934), rugby league footballer of the 1950s for New Zealand, Auckland, and Ponsonby
- Keith Bell (rugby league, born 1953), English rugby league footballer of the 1970s, 1980s and 1990s
- Keith Bell (rugby union) (born 1948), rugby union player who represented Australia
- Kendrell Bell (born 1980), American football linebacker
- Kenneth B. Bell, American judge
- Kenny Bell (born 1992), American football player
- Kerwin Bell (born 1965), American college and professional football player
- Kierstan Bell (born 2000), American basketball player
- Kristen Bell (born 1980), American actress
- Kristine Bell, American engineer

== L ==
- Lake Bell (born 1979), American actress
- Larry Bell (disambiguation), multiple people, including:
  - Larry Bell (artist) (born 1939), contemporary artist based in Los Angeles, California and Taos, New Mexico
  - Larry M. Bell, Democratic member of the North Carolina General Assembly
  - Larry Gene Bell (1949–1996), double murderer in Lexington County, South Carolina
- Laura Bell (disambiguation), multiple people, including:
  - Laura Bell (courtesan), courtesan of Victorian England
  - Laura Anning Bell (1867–1950), British artist
  - Laura Bell (author) (21st century), American author
  - Laura Bell Bundy (born 1981), American actress
  - Laura Joyce Bell (1854–1904), English-American actress
- Lauralee Bell (born 1968), actress
- Lauren Bell (born 1999), Scottish cyclist
- Lauren Bell (cricketer) (born 2001), English cricketer
- Lawrence Dale Bell (1894–1956), American aviation pioneer
- Lee Phillip Bell, talk show host and soap opera creator
- Les Bell (1901–1985), professional baseball player
- Le'Veon Bell (born 1992), American football player
- Lilian Bell (1867–1929); pen name, "Mrs. Arthur Hoyt Bogue", American novelist, travel writer
- Louis Bell (born 1982), American music producer
- Louis Bell (engineer) (1864–1923), American engineer, physicist, and academic

== M ==
- Mabel Bell (1857–1923), wife of inventor Alexander Graham Bell
- Madeline Bell (born 1942), American soul singer
- Madison Smartt Bell (born 1957), American author
- Maggie Bell (born 1945), British singer
- Malcolm Bell (cricketer) (born 1969), English cricketer
- Malcolm Bell (entrepreneur) (born 1981), British businessman
- Manga Ndumbe Bell (1838–1898), Duala ruler in Cameroon
- Marc Bell (disambiguation), multiple people, including:
  - Marc Bell (cartoonist) (born 1971), Canadian cartoonist
  - Marc Bell (drummer) (born 1956), American drummer for The Ramones and The Voidoids
  - Marc Bell (entrepreneur), American managing partner of Marc Bell Capital
- Maria Arena Bell (born 1963), American novelist, television and freelance writer
- Marie Bell (1900–1985), French tragedian, comic actor and stage director
- Marie Bell (educationalist) (1922–2012), New Zealand educationalist, lecturer and teacher
- Marilyn Bell (born 1937), swimmer
- Marjorie Bell (1906–2001), British electrical engineer and factory inspector
- Mark Bell (disambiguation), multiple people
- Markel Bell (born 2004), American football player
- Markquese Bell (born 1999), American football player
- Marshall Bell (born 1942), American actor
- Martin Bell (disambiguation), multiple people, including:
  - Martin Bell (born 1938), British journalist and broadcaster
  - Martin Bell (skier) (born 1964), British skier
  - Martin Bell (poet) (1918–1978), British poet
- Martyn Bell (born 1964), British racing driver
- Marvin Bell (1937–2020), American poet
- Mary Bell (born 1957), British killer child
- Matthew Bell (disambiguation), multiple people
  - Matt Bell (British racing driver) (born 1989), British racing driver
  - Matthew Richard Bell (born 1990), British racing driver
- Matty Bell (1899–1983), American football player and coach
- Melissa Bell (disambiguation), multiple people, including:
  - Melissa Bell (singer) (1964–2017), British singer
  - Melissa Bell (actor) (born 1972), Australian soap opera actress
- Michael Bell (disambiguation), multiple people
- Montgomery Bell (1769–1855), Tennessee manufacturing entrepreneur
- Morley Bell (1894–1976), Canadian lawyer and politician

== N ==
- Ndumbe Lobe Bell, Duala ruler in Cameroon
- Neil Bell (disambiguation), multiple people, including:
  - Neil Bell (actor) (born 1970), British actor
  - Neil Bell (politician) (born 1947), Northern Territory politician
- Nicholas Bell, Australian-based British actor
- Nicole Ann Bell (known professionally as Nicole Dollanganger) (born 1991), Canadian singer-songwriter
- Norris Garrett Bell (1860–1937), Australian railway engineer

== O ==
- O'Neil Bell (1974–2015), Jamaican professional boxer
- Oliver Bell (born 2004), American child actor

== P ==
- Pat Bell (born 1957), Canadian politician
- Pedro Bell (1950–2019), American artist and illustrator
- Peter Bell (disambiguation), multiple people, including:
  - Peter Hansbrough Bell (1849–1853), Inspector-General of the Army of Texas, 3rd Governor of Texas, US Congressman
  - Peter F. Bell (born 1976), Australian rules footballer
  - Peter R. Bell (born 1954), Australian rules footballer
  - Peter Robert Bell (1920 - 2009), British academic botanist
- Philip W. Bell (1924–1990), American accounting scholar

== Q ==
- Quentin Bell (1910–1996), English art historian and author
- Quinton Bell (born 1996), American football player

== R ==
- Raja Bell (born 1976), American basketball player
- Regla Bell (born 1970), Cuban volleyball player
- Richard Bell (disambiguation), multiple people, including:
  - Richard Bell (director) (born 1975), Canadian writer and director
  - Richard Bell (MP for Derby) (1859–1930) one of the first two British Labour Members of Parliament
  - Richard Bell (bishop), Bishop of Carlisle from 1477 to 1495
  - Richard Bell (Canadian musician), member of The Band
- Ricky Bell (disambiguation), multiple people, including:
  - Ricky Bell (running back), National Football League running back
  - Ricky Bell (cornerback), National Football League cornerback
- Rita Bell (1893–1992), American singer, entertainer
- Robert Bell (disambiguation), multiple people, including:
  - Robert Bell (speaker) (died 1577), British judge & politician
  - Robert D. Bell (born 1967), American jurist, judge on the Oklahoma Court of Civil Appeals
  - Robert E. Bell, American archaeologist
  - Robert M. Bell (born 1943), American jurist
  - Robert "Kool" Bell (born 1950), American singer, songwriter and bassist
  - Robert Bell (writer) (1800–1867), Irish man of letters
- Rolanda Bell (born 1987), Panamanian steeplechase runner
- Ronald Bell (disambiguation), multiple people, including:
  - Ronald Bell (cricketer) (1931–1989), Middlesex and Sussex cricketer
  - Ronald Bell (politician) (1914–1982), Conservative Member of Parliament 1945 and 1950–1982
  - Ronald Bell (musician) (1951–2020), American singer-songwriter, member of Kool & the Gang
  - Ronald D. Bell, Justice of the Tax Court of Canada
- Ronnie Bell British chemist at Oxford University
- Ronnie Bell (American football) (born 2000), American football player
- Ross Bell (1929–2019), American entomologist
- Roy Bell (disambiguation), multiple people, including:
  - Roy Bell (Canadian football) (born 1949), Canadian football player
  - Roy Bell (ornithologist) (1882–1966), New Zealand and Australian ornithologist
  - Roy Bell (rugby league) (born 1984), Australian rugby league player
- Rudolf Duala Manga Bell (1873–1914), Duala ruler in Cameroon
- Ryan Bell (disambiguation), multiple people.
- Ryan J. Bell (born 1971), Seventh-day Adventist Pastor, later an Atheist activist.

== S ==
- Sam Bell (footballer, born 1909) (1909–1982), English professional footballer
- Sam H. Bell (1925–2010), American jurist – Ohio
- Sam Hanna Bell (1909–1990), Northern Irish novelist, short story writer, playwright, and broadcaster
- Samuel Bell (disambiguation), multiple people, including:
  - Samuel Bell (1770–1850), American jurist & politician – New Hampshire
  - Samuel Bell (California politician) (fl. 1850s), American politician
  - Samuel Dana Bell (1798–1868), Chief justice of New Hampshire state supreme court
  - Samuel Newell Bell (1829–1889), US Congressman from New Hampshire
- Sandy Bell (1906–1985), South African Test cricketer
- Sean Bell (1984–2006), African American shot by New York City police
- Shannon Bell (born 1955), Canadian philosopher and feminist
- Shona M. Bell (1924–2011), New Zealand palaeontologist
- Solon Bell, American union leader
- Stefan Bell (born 1991), German footballer with 1. FSV Mainz 05 in the Bundesliga
- Stephen Bell (1965–2001), English footballer
- Steve Bell (disambiguation), multiple people, including:
  - Steve Bell (news anchor) (1935–2019), first anchor of the ABC News program World News This Morning, previously reporter for WOWT-TV
  - Steve Bell (cartoonist) (born 1951), English cartoonist
  - Steve Bell (musician) (born 1960), Canadian musician
  - Steve Bell (soccer) (born 1975), retired American soccer midfielder
- Steven Bell (born 1976), Australian rugby league player
- Stuart Bell (1938–2012), British Labour Party politician
- Stuart R. Bell, American academic, President of the University of Alabama
- Susan Bell (forester), British planner and forester

== T ==
- Tatum Bell (born 1981), American football running back
- Terrel Bell (1921–1996), American Secretary of Education
- Terrell Bell (born 1973), American basketball player
- Terry Bell (disambiguation), multiple people
- Theo Bell (1953–2006), American football wide receiver
- Thom Bell (1943–2022), Jamaican-American music producer
- Thomas Bell (disambiguation), multiple people, including:
  - Thomas Bell (zoologist), English zoologist, surgeon, and writer
  - Thomas Cowan Bell, one of the seven founders of Sigma Chi Fraternity
  - Thomas M. Bell (Ohio politician)
  - Thomas Reid Davys Bell, Irish lepidopterist
- Tim Bell, British public relations and political adviser
- Tina Bell (1957–2012), American singer
- Tobin Bell, American actor
- Tom Bell (Australian footballer) (born 1991), Australian rules footballer
- Tombi Bell (born 1979), U.S Virgin Islands former basketball player
- Torsten Bell (born 1982), British politician
- Townsend Bell (born 1975), motor racing driver, married to actress Heather Campbell
- Travis Bell (born 1998), American football player
- Trevor Bell (disambiguation), multiple people, including:
  - Trevor Bell (artist) (1930–2017), English painter
  - Trevor Bell (baseball) (born 1986), American baseball pitcher
- Troy Bell (born 1980), American professional basketball player

== V ==
- Van D. Bell (1918–2009), American Marine officer, recipient of two Navy Crosses
- Vanessa Bell (1879–1961), British painter
- Vera Bell (1906-?), Jamaican writer
- Vereen Bell, American writer
- Vernon Bell, founder of the British karate movement
- Victor Bell (1878–1965), Australian Methodist and Presbyterian minister
- Vinnie Bell (1932–2019), born Vincent Gambella, American session guitarist
- Viola Bell (1897–1990), New Zealand community leader
- Virginia Bell (actress), American model and actress

== W ==
- Wade Bell (1945–2024), American middle-distance runner
- Wally Bell (1965–2013), American baseball umpire
- Wesley Bell (born 1974), American politician
- W. Kamau Bell, American stand-up comic
- W. D. M. Bell (1880–1954), Scottish-born elephant hunter
- Wayne Bell (computer specialist), bulletin board pioneer
- William Bell (disambiguation), multiple people, including:
  - William Dwane Bell, New Zealander convicted for a triple murder
  - William E. Bell (author) (fl. 2000s), Canadian writer
  - William Henry Bell (1873–1946), English born composer, later South African Professor of Music
  - William J. Bell (1927–2005), TV producer
  - William Nathaniel Bell (1817–1887), American settler
- Winthrop Pickard Bell (1884–1965), Canadian academic and historian

== Y ==
- Yeremiah Bell (born 1978), American football safety for the Miami Dolphins of the National Football League

== Z ==
- Zoë Bell (born 1978), New Zealand stuntwoman and actress

== See also ==
- Bell (disambiguation)
