= Brian Bell (disambiguation) =

Brian Bell (born 1968) is an American guitarist for the band Weezer.

Brian Bell may also refer to:

- Brian Bell (American football) (born 1984), American football fullback
- Brian Bell (basketball) (born 1989), American wheelchair basketball player
- Brian Bell (businessman) (1928–2010), Australian-born businessman in Papua New Guinea
- Brian Bell (director) (born 1947), New Zealand writer and director
- Brian Bell (ornithologist) (1930–2016), New Zealand ornithologist
- Brian Bell (politician) (born 1936), South African politician
- Brian Murray (actor) (1937–2018), South African actor born Brian Bell

== See also ==
- Bryan Bell, Canadian politician
