= Laura Bell =

Laura Bell may refer to:

- Laura Bell (courtesan) (1829–1894), famous courtesan of Victorian England
- Laura Anning Bell (1867–1950), British artist
- Laura Bell (author) (21st century), American author
- Laura Bell Bundy (born 1981), American actress
- Laura Joyce Bell (1854–1904), English-American actress
- Laura Bell (drag queen), Chilean drag queen who competed on the first and second season of The Switch Drag Race

== See also ==
- Laura Belli (born 1947), Italian actress and singer
