= Ian Bell (disambiguation) =

Ian Bell (born 1982) is an English cricketer.

Ian Bell may also refer to:

- Ian Bell (journalist) (1956–2015), Scottish journalist and writer
- Ian Bell (literaturist) (born 1947), professor of American literature at Keele University
- Ian Bell (musician) (born 1954), Canadian musician
- Ian Bell (programmer) (born 1962), British computer programmer
- Ian Bell (CEO) (born 1976), founder and CEO of Digital Trends
- Ian Spencer Bell, American dancer, choreographer, teacher, and poet
