= Ernest Bell =

Ernest Bell may refer to:

- Ernest Bell (Australian politician) (1880–1930), pastoralist and member of the Queensland Legislative Assembly
- Ernest Bell (activist) (1851–1933), English publisher, writer and activist
- Ernest Arthur Bell (1926–2006), English botanist and chemist
- J. Ernest Bell II (born 1941), American politician in the Maryland House of Delegates
- Ernest Bell (footballer), English footballer
- Ernie Bell (1918–1968), English professional footballer
- David Bell (artist) (Ernest David Bell, 1915–1959), English-born writer and curator, a controversial figure in Welsh arts

== See also ==
- Ernest Morrison-Bell (1871–1960), British soldier and parliamentarian
