= Arthur Bell =

Arthur Bell may refer to:

- Arthur Bell (martyr) (1590–1643), Franciscan and English martyr
- Arthur Bell (distiller), (1825–1900), founded Bell's whisky brand
- Arthur Bell (cricketer) (1869–1946), New Zealand cricketer
- Arthur Bell (engineer) (1856–1943), New Zealand engineer
- Arthur Bell (footballer) (1882–1923), English footballer
- Arthur Bell (physician) (1900–1970), British consultant paediatrician
- Arthur Hornbui Bell (1891–1973), Grand Dragon of the Ku Klux Klan in New Jersey
- Arthur Bell (rower) (1899–1963), Canadian Olympic rower
- Arthur Bell (journalist) (1939–1984), American journalist, author and LGBT rights activist
- Art Bell (1945–2018), American broadcaster and author
- Arthur L. Bell, American politician
- Arthur Kinmond Bell (1868–1942), Scottish distiller and philanthropist

== See also ==
- Bell Arthur, North Carolina, United States
- Ernest Arthur Bell (1926–2006), director of the Royal Botanic Gardens, Kew, 1981–1988
