= Samuel Bell =

Samuel Bell may refer to:

- Samuel Bell (architect) (1739–1813), Scottish architect
- Samuel Dana Bell (1798–1868), chief justice of New Hampshire supreme court
- Samuel Bell (New Hampshire politician) (1770–1850), jurist, governor and U.S. senator
- Samuel Bell (California politician) (fl. 1850s), 19th-century controller of California
- Samuel Newell Bell (1829–1889), U.S. congressman from New Hampshire
- Sam Bell (Florida politician), member of the Florida House of Representatives
- Sam H. Bell (1925–2010), U.S. federal judge for the northern district of Ohio
- Sam Bell (Rhode Island politician) (born 1989), American politician
- Sam Bell (footballer, born 1909) (1909–1982), English football forward
- Sam Bell (footballer, born 2002), English football midfielder

== See also ==
- Sam Hanna Bell (1909–1990), Scottish novelist
