= Isaac Bell =

Isaac Bell may refer to:

- Sir Isaac Bell, 1st Baronet (1816–1904), English ironmaster and politician
- Isaac Bell Jr. (1846–1889), American businessman and diplomat
- Isaac Bell House
- Isaac Bell, a character in a series of books by Clive Cussler

== See also ==
- Bell (surname)
