= Steve Bell =

Steve Bell may refer to:

- Steve Bell (news anchor) (1935–2019), first anchor of the ABC News program World News This Morning, previously reporter for WOWT-TV
- Steve Bell (cartoonist) (born 1950/1), English cartoonist
- Steve Bell (musician) (born 1960), Canadian musician
- Steve Bell (soccer) (born 1975), retired American soccer midfielder
- Steve Bell (Ackley Bridge), fictional character
- Steven Bell (born 1976), Australian rugby league player
- Steven Bell (footballer) (born 1985), Scottish footballer

== See also ==
- Stephen Bell (1965–2001), English footballer
