= Winslow S. Pierce =

American physician, politician, and industrialist (1819–1888)

2nd Comptroller of California
- In office January 1852 – January 1854
- Preceded by: John S. Houston
- Succeeded by: Samuel Bell

Personal details
- Born: Winslow Smith Pierce; May 3, 1819 Massachusetts
- Died: July 29, 1888 (aged 69) Brooklyn, New York, U.S.
- Party: Democratic
- Education: Dartmouth College (BA); Harvard Medical School (MD)
- Occupation: Physician, politician, industrialist

Winslow Smith Pierce (May 3, 1819 – July 29, 1888) was an American physician, California Gold Rush-era politician, and Midwestern industrialist. He served as the second Comptroller of California from 1852 to 1854 and later became a prominent figure in Indiana's early coal and iron industries.

== Early life and education ==
Pierce was born on May 3, 1819, in Massachusetts. He graduated from Dartmouth College in 1841 and subsequently earned his medical degree from Harvard Medical School. Following his medical training, Pierce relocated to the Midwest, practicing medicine in both Indiana and Illinois during the 1840s.

== California Gold Rush and political career ==
In 1849, Pierce traveled west to California at the height of the California Gold Rush. Becoming active in early state politics as a Democrat, he was elected Comptroller of California in 1851, succeeding inaugural officeholder John S. Houston. He served in the post from 1852 to 1854 before being succeeded by Samuel Bell.

During his time on the Pacific Coast, Pierce also pursued major transportation ventures. He helped establish a line of steamships operating between Panama and San Francisco to carry passengers and freight during the Gold Rush boom, and he participated in preliminary planning for the Union Pacific Railroad.
