= G. Bell =

G. Bell may refer to:

- Graham E. Bell, American amateur astronomer and prolific discoverer of minor planets
- George Bell & Sons, English book publishing house 1839–1986
- Bell (surname)#G
