= Joshua Bell (disambiguation) =

Joshua Bell (born 1967) is an American violinist.

Joshua Bell may also refer to:

- Joshua Fry Bell (1811–1870), U.S. Representative from Kentucky
- Joshua Bell (shoe manufacturer) (c. 1812–1863), early Canadian businessman
- Sir Joshua Peter Bell (1827–1881), member of the Queensland Legislative Assembly
- Joshua Thomas Bell (1863–1911), member of the Queensland Legislative Assembly, son of Joshua Peter Bell

== See also ==
- Josh Bell (disambiguation)
