= Dennis Bell =

Dennis Bell may refer to:

- Dennis Bell (basketball) (born 1951), American basketball player
- Dennis Bell (footballer) (born 1940), Australian rules footballer
- Dennis Bell (journalist) (1948–1995), American journalist
- Dennis Bell (Medal of Honor) (1866–1953), Buffalo Soldier of the Spanish–American War
- Dennis R. Bell (1934–1959), British meteorologist and researcher

== See also ==
- Bell (surname)
