= Roy Bell =

Roy Bell may refer to:

- Roy Bell (Canadian football) (born 1949), Canadian football player
- Roy Bell (ornithologist) (1882–1966), New Zealand and Australian ornithologist
- Roy Bell (rugby league) (born 1984), Australian rugby league player
- Roy Bell (politician) (1885–1953), Australian politician
