= Peter Bell =

Peter Bell may refer to:

== People ==
- Peter Hansborough Bell (1810–1898), governor of Texas, U.S. representative
- Peter Bell (footballer, born 1898) (1898–1965), English footballer
- Peter Bell (footballer, born 1976), Australian rules footballer, played for Fremantle and North Melbourne
- Peter R. Bell (born 1954), Australian rules footballer, played for St Kilda and Sandringham
- Peter Bell (actor), British actor
- Peter Bell (German politician) (1889–1939), German teacher and politician
- Peter Alan Bell (born 1958), American doctor of osteopathic medicine
- Peter Albany Bell (1871–1957), caterer and confectioner in Western Australia
- Peter Bell (rugby union) (born 1937), English rugby union player

== Other ==
- Pietje Bell, a series of Dutch children's books from 1914 to 1936
- Peter Bell (film), a 2002 Dutch film
- Peter Bell II: The Hunt for the Czar Crown, a 2003 Dutch film
- "Peter Bell" (Wordsworth), a long poem by William Wordsworth first published in 1819
- "Peter Bell, A Lyrical Ballad", an 1819 poem by John Hamilton Reynolds, a parody of Wordsworth's poem
- "Peter Bell the Third", an 1819 poem by Percy Bysshe Shelley, written as a parody of Wordsworth's poem
- Peter Bell, a 19th-century English phrase for a "simple rustic" (after Wordsworth's poem of the same title)
