= Malcolm Bell =

Malcolm Bell may refer to:

- Malcolm Bell (cricketer) (born 1969), English cricketer
- Malcolm Bell (entrepreneur) (born 1981), British businessman
- Malcolm Bell (died 2024) University of Virginia archaeologist
