= Ryan Bell =

Ryan Bell may refer to:

- Ryan Bell (basketball) (born 1984), Canadian basketball player
- Ryan J. Bell (born 1971), American former Seventh-day Adventist pastor
