= Brian Bell (politician) =

South African politician (born 1936)

Member of the National Assembly
- In office June 1999 – April 2004
- Constituency: Mpumalanga

Personal details
- Born: Brian Gordon Bell; 14 June 1936 (age 89)
- Citizenship: South Africa
- Party: Democratic Alliance; Democratic Party

Brian Gordon Bell (born 14 June 1936) is a retired South African politician who represented the Democratic Party (DP), later the Democratic Alliance (DA), in the National Assembly from 1999 to 2004. With Manny da Camara, he was elected in the 1999 general election as one of the DP's two representatives in the Mpumalanga caucus.

Bell served stints as the DP's spokesperson in the Standing Committee on Public Accounts and as the DP's spokesperson on minerals and energy. Ahead of the 2004 general election, he was omitted from the DA's party list, and he left Parliament after the election.
