= Hugh Bell =

Hugh Bell may refer to:

- Hugh Bell (photographer) (1927–2012), American photographer
- Hugh Bell (educator) (1780–1860), member of the Nova Scotia House of Assembly
- Sir Hugh Bell, 2nd Baronet (1844–1931), mayor of Middlesbrough
- Sir Hugh Bell, 4th Baronet (1923–1970), of the Bell baronets

== See also ==
- Bell (surname)
