= Alexandra Bell =

Alexandra Bell may refer to:

- Alexandra Bell (artist) (born 1983), American artist
- Alexandra Bell (athlete) (born 1992), British athlete
- Alexandra Bell (writer) (born 1986), English author also known as Alex Bell
