= Thomas Bell =

Thomas Bell may refer to:

== Arts and entertainment ==
- Thomas Bell (born 1985), known professionally as Toddla T, English DJ and producer
- Thomas Bell (antiquarian) (1785–1860), English book collector
- Thomas Bell (novelist) (1903–1961), American novelist
- Tom Bell (actor) (1933–2006), British actor
- Tom Bell (comedy actor) (born 1981), British comedy actor
- Thom Bell (1943–2022), Jamaican-born American record producer

== Politics ==
- Thomas Bell (mayor of Gloucester) (1486–1566), English cap manufacturer, mayor of Gloucester and MP
- Sir Hugh Bell, 2nd Baronet (Thomas Hugh Bell, 1844–1931), mayor of Middlesbrough, England
- Thomas M. Bell (Georgia politician) (1861–1941), Democratic US congressman from Georgia
- Thomas M. Bell (Ohio politician) (born 1950s), Democratic representative in the Ohio House of Representatives
- Thomas Bell (politician, born 1863) (1863–1945), Canadian politician
- Thomas Hamilton Bell (1878–1939), businessman and political figure in Ontario
- Thomas Miller Bell (1923–1996), Canadian member of parliament
- Thomas Hastie Bell (1867–1942), Scottish anarchist
- Thomas S. Bell (1800–1861), American judge and politician
- Tom Bell (politician) (1882–1944), British communist activist

== Religion ==
- Thomas Bell (Catholic priest) (1551–1610), English Roman Catholic priest, later an anti-Catholic writer
- Thomas Bell (minister) (1733–1802), Scottish theologian and translator
- Thomas Bell (Anglican priest) (1820–1917), Dean of Guernsey, 1892–1917

== Sports ==
- Thomas Bell (footballer, born 1884) (1884–1951), English footballer
- Tommy Bell (footballer, born 1906) (1906–1983), English footballer
- Tommy Bell (footballer, born 1923) (1923–1988), English footballer
- Tommy Bell (Australian footballer) (1895–1955), Australian rules footballer for Essendon
- Tom Bell (Australian footballer) (born 1991), Australian rules footballer for Carlton
- Tommy Bell (American football official) (1922–1986), American football official in the National Football League
- Tommy Bell (American football player) (1932–2019), American football player, member of Army Black Knights football
- Thomas H. Bell (born 1944), American football and lacrosse coach
- Tommy Bell (rugby union) (born 1992), rugby union player for London Irish
- Tommy Bell (boxer) (1923–1994), African-American boxer
- Tommy Bell (basketball) (1922–1949), American basketball player

== Other ==
- Thomas Bell (ironmaster) (1784–1858), co-founder of Losh, Wilson and Bell, iron and alkali company
- Thomas Bell (zoologist) (1792–1880), English zoologist, surgeon and writer
- Thomas B. Bell (1796–1858), Texas landowner of Stephen F. Austin's Old Three Hundred
- Thomas Bell (capitalist) (1820–1892), Scottish-American investor and banker
- Tom Bell (outlaw) (1825–1856), American outlaw and physician
- Thomas Cowan Bell (1832–1919), co-founder of Sigma Chi Fraternity
- Thomas S. Bell Jr. (1838–1862), Union Army officer killed in action at the Battle of Antietam
- Thomas Bell (engineer) (1865–1952), British engineer and shipbuilder
- Thomas Reid Davys Bell (1863–1948), lepidopterist, naturalist and forest officer
