= Elizabeth Bell =

Elizabeth Bell may refer to:

- Elizabeth Gould Bell (1862–1934), Ireland's first woman doctor
- Elizabeth Viola Bell (1897–1990), New Zealand community leader
- Elizabeth Bell (actress) (1941–2012), British actress who played stage and screen
- Elizabeth Bell (composer) (1928–2016), founder of the New York Women Composers, Inc.
- Elizabeth "Budd" Bell (1915–2009), human service lobbyist and social worker
- Elizabeth Galloway Bell (1911–2007), Australian Buddhist
