= Jeff Bell =

Jeff or Jeffrey Bell may refer to:

- Jeffrey Bell, American television script-writer
- Jeff Bell (politician) (1943–2018), American Republican politician
- Jeff Bell (executive) (born 1962), American businessman
- Jeff Bell (cartoonist) (born 1978), New Zealand cartoonist

== See also ==
- Geoff Bell (disambiguation)
