= Don Bell =

Don Bell may refer to:

- Don Bell (politician) (born 1942), Canadian politician
- Don Bell (broadcaster), American radio broadcaster
- Don Bell (curler), Canadian wheelchair curler
- Don Bell (discus thrower) (born 1940), American discus thrower, 1960 All-American for the Stanford Cardinal track and field team
