= Waimea Plains =

Waimea Plain(s) could refer to the following areas in New Zealand:

- Waimea Plain (Southland), an area in Southland
- Waimea Plains (Tasman), an area in Tasman
