= Arthur Bell (cricketer) =

New Zealand cricketer (1869–1946)

Personal information
- Full name: Arthur George Bell
- Born: 2 May 1869; Waimea Plains, Southland, New Zealand
- Died: 20 June 1946 (aged 77); Sydney, New South Wales, Australia

Domestic team information
- Years: Team
- 1888/89–1893/94: Otago
- FC debut: 25 January 1889 Otago v Canterbury
- Last FC: 3 March 1894 Otago v Canterbury

Career statistics
Competition	First-class
Matches	12
Runs scored	184
Batting average	9.20
100s/50s	0/0
Top score	37
Catches/stumpings	9/–
- Source: ESPNcricinfo, 22 January 2021

Arthur George Bell (2 May 1869 – 20 June 1946) was a New Zealand cricketer. He played twelve first-class matches for Otago between 1888 and 1894, and was noted as a fine fieldsman.

== First-class cricket career ==
Bell played 12 first-class cricket matches for Otago between the 1888/89 and 1893/94 seasons. In all, he scored 184 runs, with a high score of 37, at an average of 9.20. Particularly noted for his fielding ability, he took nine catches in first-class matches, and was described in 1898 as probably the best fielder at point that Otago had had up until that time. After a match against Canterbury in the 1892/93 season, the Canterbury Times cricket columnist noted Bell's splendid fielding at point, saying, "The cool way in which he stopped terrifically hard cuts astonished more than one of the Canterbury batsmen."

== Biography ==
Born at Waimea Plains on 2 May 1869, Bell was the son of George Meredith Bell, a prominent runholder in Southland, and Margaret Bell (née Robertson). The family lived in London for some years from the late 1870s to the early 1880s, and Bell spent a term at Rugby School in 1884. The family then moved for a time to Victoria, before returning to New Zealand in about 1885, to live at Wantwood station in Southland.

Bell passed the matriculation examinations of the University of New Zealand in December 1888, and went on to study at the University of Otago. He completed papers in constitutional law and history, and jurisprudence at Otago in 1890, and senior Latin in 1891, but did not complete a degree.

At the annual meeting of the Carisbrook Cricket Club in September 1890, Bell was elected deputy club captain. At the meeting he noted that the club had the best ground and most members of any club in Dunedin, and spoke passionately about the need for club members to practice more, in order for the club to be more successful, which would in turn provincial cricket in Otago.

Just think over it for a moment, and you will find that our failure can be traced to the meaning conveyed by the three words want of practice. Someone once wrote 'a poet is born and not made.' Now, I can't get it out of my head that a large number of the members of our club have got hold of that phrase and interpreted it as if it could be applied equally well to a cricketer. Now, that kind of thing won't work in practice at all. But joking aside, I feel very strongly on this subject, inasmuch as we have now to face the question, whether cricket is to be a success in Otago or not, and I maintain that the success of provincial cricket mainly depends on the success of the clubs, and that the success of the clubs entirely depends on the amount of interest taken in cricket by its members. Let us, therefore, during the coming season see each night at 'the nets' a goodly muster of members, and let each member by attending strictly to practice strive to revive in a province where it is rapidly dying out what, gentlemen, is the finest game in the world. Only let the members of Carisbrook pay some heed to this advice, and I am sure that they will feel at the end of the season they have done good for themselves, they have benefited their club, and have helped to improve cricket throughout Otago.

At the same meeting, Bell was elected as one of the club's two delegates to the Otago Cricketers' Association, along with club captain Charles Rattray. Bell was re-elected to both posts at the club annual meeting the following year.

In late March 1892, Bell left Dunedin, returning to Southland where he took up farming on his father's property at Wantwood on the Waimea Plain. At that time, he was praised by a Dunedin newspaper columnist, who described Bell as follows:

"He is a dashing batsman of a class that never lets the game get dull—a clean hitter all round the wicket, particularly on the off-side, and a fast scorer. Moreover, he is a brilliant in-fielder, and at point has had no superior here, and he bowls a slow ball with a big break from leg."

However, Bell still made himself available to play for Otago in the 1892/93 and 1893/94 seasons, and spent time in Dunedin practising before interprovincial matches. He continued to play club cricket in Southland, and was captain of the Mandeville team. He also went on tour with the Carisbrook club to Christchurch in December 1893. In January 1894, Bell carried his bat in scoring 111 not out for Mandeville in a club game against Riversdale, in what was believed to be a record for Southland country cricket matches. In the 1894/95, 1895/96, and 1896/97 seasons, he travelled to Tasmania, playing club cricket in Hobart for the Break o' Day club. In November 1896, Bell represented Southland in a match at Invercargill against the touring Australian team, with Bell being described as one of only two Southland batsmen who seemed comfortable against the Australian bowling attack. In February 1903, Bell played for Southland against Lord Hawke's XI in a two-day match at Invercargill, scoring a pair. Bell continued to represent Southland in the 1903/04 season.

In 1905, Bell sold his property, The Willowbank Farm—the rump of the old Wantwood station—and moved to Australia to continue farming.

Bell died in Kings Cross, New South Wales, Australia, on 20 June 1946.
