= Ronald Bell =

Ronald or Ronnie Bell may refer to:

- Ronnie Bell (chemist) (1907–1996), British physical chemist
- Sir Ronald Bell (politician) (1914–1982), British Conservative Member of Parliament, 1945 and 1950–1982
- Ronald Bell (cricketer) (1931–1989), English cricketer for Middlesex and Sussex
- Ronald D. Bell (1932–2020), justice of the Tax Court of Canada
- Ronald Bell (musician) (1951–2020), American singer-songwriter with Kool & the Gang
- Ronnie Bell (American football) (born 2000), American football player
