= Alison Bell =

Alison Bell may refer to:

- Alison Bell (actress) (born 1978), Australian actor
- Alison Bell (politician) (1925–2021), Hong Kong politician
- Alison Bell (bowls) (born 1983), Northern Irish lawn bowler
- Alison Bell (field hockey) (born 1984), Scottish field hockey player
- Alison M. Bell, American scientist
- Alison Bell, chancellor of WGU Indiana
