= Gordon Bell (disambiguation) =

Gordon Bell (1934–2024) was an American electrical engineer.

Gordon Bell may also refer to:

- Charles Gordon Bell (1889–1918), British pilot
- Gordon Bell (surgeon) (1887–1970), New Zealand surgeon and university professor
- Gordon Bell (physician) (1911–2005), Canadian physician
- Gordie Bell (1925–1985), Canadian ice hockey goaltender
- Gordon Bell (cartoonist) (1934–2014), British cartoon artist
- Gordon Bell (American football) (born 1953), American football running back
- Gordon Bell (footballer) (1906–1979), English footballer
- Gordon Bell (singer-songwriter) (born 1969), Scottish musician based in Switzerland
- Gordon Bell (QNX), Canadian software designer, co-founder of the QNX operating system

== Other ==
- Gordon Bell High School, Winnipeg, Canada
- Gordon Bell Prize, awarded by the Association for Computing Machinery
