= Brendan Bell =

Brendan Bell may refer to:

- Brendan Bell (ice hockey) (born 1983), Canadian ice hockey defenceman
- Brendan Bell (politician) (born 1971), Canadian territorial level politician and former cabinet minister
- Brendan Bell (footballer) (1910–?), Scottish footballer
- Brendan Bell (Neighbours), fictional character from the Australian soap opera Neighbours
