= Don Bell (broadcaster) =

American broadcaster

Clarence Alton Beliel, commonly known as Don Bell, is an American radio broadcaster best known for his radio work broadcasting from the Philippines in the years leading up to World War II.

Bell wanted to be a foreign correspondent from an early age, so he joined the US Marines in 1926 as the quickest way of getting abroad. He served in China for six years, based in the international settlements of Shanghai and Tientsin. After his discharge he joined the Shanghai Evening Post & Mercury, an American-owned, English-language daily newspaper. When it acquired a radio station, Bell added broadcasting to his other journalistic duties. With the Japanese invasion of 1937, Bell fled to Manila in the Philippines.

In Manila, Bell worked as a publicity director for an American department store, Heacock's, as well as serving as a foreign correspondent for NBC and serving as news coordinator with the British Ministry of Information, the Free French Committee and the Free Czech Committee. Bell also worked for Radio Manila, also known as Radio KZRH, and his broadcasts were one of the main sources of news for the Anglophone population in the Far East.

We also went to listen regularly to Don Bell who broadcast an excellent Far Eastern news bulletin from Radio Manila at 12.45pm daily. Every Englishman and American living in the Far East at that time will remember him. He was an excellent newscaster of Far Eastern affairs, and left any other station cold.

As the Japanese invasion neared, Bell was commandeered by the Philippine Government and by General MacArthur's headquarters to help maintain morale by continuing to broadcast hourly. This he did until the radio transmitters had to be destroyed to prevent them from falling into the hands of the enemy.

At the Japanese invasion of the Philippines, Bell dropped his radio name and assumed his real name of Clarence Beliel, and arranged to be taken by the Japanese while working at Heacock's Department Store. The deception was maintained by all who knew him as Don Bell; to have revealed that he was the person who had made many anti-Japanese broadcasts would have had dire consequences. Bell was interned, together with his wife Lilia and two sons Clarence and Richard, at Santo Tomas University in Manila. During this period, Bell was erroneously reported as dead, and was told of a "beautiful memorial broadcast" a non-interned Filipino friend had heard over KGEI, a short-wave radio station broadcasting from San Francisco. The camp was liberated in February 1945, and Bell was greeted by General MacArthur with the words "Hello, Lazarus: I am happy to see you have returned from the dead".

Almost immediately after his liberation, Bell went back to war reporting. On 22 March 1945 the plane he was in was shot down over Amoy Harbour in China while on a bombing mission. Bell and seven other survivors were hidden from the Japanese by Chinese guerilla fighters and smuggled to Chunking in China, and from there back to Manila. Bell covered the Australian landings at Balikpapan in Borneo on 1 July 1945

After the war Bell reported on some of the atomic bomb tests at the Bikini Atoll in 1946, and then returned to the United States where he worked for NBC as well as various radio stations such as WGAY in Silver Spring, Maryland in 1947, where he was director of news and special events, and KOME in Tulsa, Oklahoma in the late 1940s and early 1950s.

In February 1954 Bell moved to Palm Beach, Florida, where he met his second wife, Ginny. In 2000 Don Bell was living in retirement in Florida.
