= Vera Bell =

Jamaican writer (1904–1984)

- Born: Vera Zilla Alberta Taylor; 16 June 1904; Clonmel, Saint Mary Parish, Jamaica
- Died: 15 January 1984 (aged 79); Middlesex, England
- Education: Columbia University; London University
- Occupations: Poet, short-story writer and playwright
- Notable work: "Ancestor on the Auction Block" (1948)

Vera Bell or Vera Alberta or Albertha Bell (16 June 1904 – 15 January 1984) was a Jamaican poet, short-story writer and playwright. Her 1948 poem "Ancestor on the Auction Block" has been anthologized several times, although a 2005 review of The Oxford Book of Caribbean Verse says "some of the earlier poems survive only as amusing museum pieces, such as Vera Bell's 'Ancestor on the Auction Block'." The poem is described by Laurence A. Breiner in his An Introduction to West Indian Poetry (1998) as "a poem whose crux is the poet's troubled relation to the poet's ancestral subject/object", and Breiner cites George Lamming as placing the poem "squarely at a liminal moment in the process of establishing contact with a previously objectified or fetishized Other".

== Life ==
Bell was born in Clonmel, Saint Mary Parish, Jamaica, and was educated at Wolmer's Girls' School. She worked in welfare after leaving school, and then studied at Columbia University and London University.

Bell's 1943 Soliday and the Wicked Bird, staged by the Little Theatre Movement of Jamaica, has been described as "the first original Jamaican pantomime".

Bell had a number of short stories published in the political weekly Public Opinion and the Jamaican little magazine FOCUS, edited by Edna Manley. ‘The Bamboo Pipe’ and ‘Joshua,’ were also included in two early edited volumes of short fiction: 14 Jamaican Short Stories (1950) and Caribbean Anthology of Short Stories (1953) respectively – both part of The Gleaner’s mid-century book publishing series, The Pioneer Press, which Una Marson initially proposed and edited.

In 1971 she published Ogog (Vantage Press, New York), described as "An uncommon verse novel charting the rise of a primitive". A writer in the Journal of West Indian Literature in 1989 said: "Vera Bell, for example, is known for a single much-discussed poem, "Ancestor on the Auction Block" (no one knows her book-length Ogog)."

Bell's "Death of a comrade" was included in the 1989 West Indian Poetry: An Anthology for Schools edited by Kenneth Ramchand and Cecil Gray.

In 1981–1982, a 30-minute programme about Bell was broadcast in the series First person feminine on WOI-FM Radio, Ames, Iowa, United States, and was recorded on audio cassette by the Iowa State University Media Resources Center.

The Vera Bell Prize for Poetry, part of the Young Black Writers Awards, was won in 1985 by Maud Sulter for her work As a Blackwoman.

Jamaican Prime Minister Portia Simpson Miller ended her 1 August 2014 Emancipation Day Message with the words "Poet Vera Bell’s words ring true:" and excerpts from "Ancestor on the Auction Block" ending with its last line "Mine be the task to build", adding: "Build we can… build we must… build we shall! This is Jamaica, our Jamaica, Land we love. I thank you."

Vera Bell died on 15 January 1984, in Middlesex, England.

Bell's daughter Patsy was married to Gerry German (1928–2012), headmaster of Manchester High School in Mandeville, Jamaica, and a political activist.
