= Kathleen Bell =

American physician

- Education: Temple University (MD)
- Occupations: Professor, physician

Kathleen Bell is an American physician, currently the Kimberly-Clark Distinguished Chair in Mobility Research.

A fictionalized version of Bell was featured on Saturday Night Live, where she was portrayed by Aidy Bryant.
