= Jacob Bell =

Jacob Bell may refer to:

- Jacob Bell (American football) (born 1981), American football guard
- Jacob Bell (chemist) (1810–1859), British pharmaceutical chemist and reformist
- Jacob Bell (shipbuilder) (1792–1852), shipbuilder, Brown & Bell, New York
- USS Jacob Bell (1842), a sidewheel steamer acquired by the Union Navy for use during the American Civil War
- Jacob Bell, a New York pilot boat
