= Melissa Bell =

Melissa Bell may refer to:

- Melissa Bell (singer) (1964–2017), British lead singer of Soul II Soul
- Melissa Bell (actor) (born 1972), Australian soap opera actress
- Melissa Bell (journalist) (born 1978/9), publisher of Vox Media
