= Neil Bell =

Neil Bell may refer to:

- Neil Bell (actor) (born 1969), British actor
- Neil Bell (politician) (born 1947), Northern Territory politician
- Neil Bell, pseudonym of Stephen Southwold (1887–1964), British writer

== See also ==
- Neal Bell, American playwright
