= Kristine Bell =

American electrical engineer

Kristine Bell is an electronics engineer from Metron, Inc. of Reston, Virginia. She was named Fellow of the Institute of Electrical and Electronics Engineers (IEEE) in 2015 for her contributions to statistical signal processing with radar and sonar applications. Bell earned her B.S. degree in electrical engineering in 1985 from Rice University in Houston, Texas. She continued on to receive her M.S. degree in electrical engineering in 1990 from George Mason University (GMU) in Fairfax, Virginia. Bell stayed at GMU and earned her Ph.D. in information technology in 1995. As of 2022, she has currently authored or coauthored 82 publications on various electrical engineering and information technology topics.
