= Jeanne Bell =

British artist

Dorothy Jeanne Bell (1888 – 1978) was a British sculptor.

== Biography ==
Bell was born and raised at Hampstead in north London. Her father, John Clement Bell (1860–1944) was a senior partner in the Clayton and Bell company of stained glass manufacturers, while her brother, Reginald Bell, and her nephew, Michael Farrar-Bell were also artists.

Jeanne Bell created statuettes in bronze, ivory, wood and alabaster plus animal figures in both terracotta and glazed earthenware. She was a regular exhibitor at the Royal Academy in London, showing some 37 works there between 1927 and 1966. She also exhibited works with the Society of Women Artists, the Royal Glasgow Institute of the Fine Arts, the Royal Miniature Society, with the Arts and Crafts Exhibition Society and at the Walker Art Gallery in Liverpool. Bell was active as an artist until late in her life. She died at Dinton in Buckinghamshire where she had lived most of her life after leaving London.
