= Chris Bell =

Chris Bell or Christopher Bell may refer to:

== Politics ==
- Chris Bell (politician) (born 1959), former US Congressman
- Christopher Bell (Mississippi politician) (born 1970), member of the Mississippi House of Representatives

== Sports ==
- Chris Bell (offensive tackle) (born 1976), American football offensive tackle
- Chris Bell (wide receiver) (born 2004), American football wide receiver
- Chris Bell (poker player) (born 1971), American professional poker player
- Chris Bell (rugby union) (born 1983), rugby union footballer
- Christopher Bell (racing driver) (born 1994), NASCAR driver

== Other people ==
- Chris Bell (American musician) (1951–1978), singer-songwriter and guitarist of the band Big Star
- Chris Bell, half of The Allen Brothers
- Chris Bell (director) (born 1972), American director and writer
- Christopher Bell (businessman) (born 1957), British businessman
- Christopher Bell (scholar) (1974–2009), disability studies scholar
- Christopher C. Bell (born 1933), American writer
- Chris Bell (British Army officer), British Army officer
