= Alison M. Bell =

American ecologist

Alison Marie Bell
- Education: University of Chicago
- Scientific career
- Workplaces: University of Illinois at Urbana–Champaign; University of California, Davis; University of Glasgow
- Thesis: Effects of an endocrine disrupter on the development of behavioral differences between individuals and populations of threespined stickleback (Gasterosteus aculeatus) (2003)

Alison M. Bell is an American ecologist who studies animal behaviour at the University of Illinois at Urbana–Champaign. She has focused on the evolution of and mechanisms that underpin animal personality. In 2020, she was elected a Fellow of the American Association for the Advancement of Science. In 2024, she was elected to the American Academy of Arts and Sciences and was awarded a Guggenheim fellowship, an award that allowed her to further research projects.

== Early life and education ==
Bell was an undergraduate student at the University of Chicago, where she studied the history and philosophy of science. She moved to the University of California, Davis for her graduate studies, where she earned a doctorate in population biology. Her doctoral research considered the three-spined stickleback, a species with which she became an expert. Bell was a postdoctoral scholar at the University of Glasgow, and was an AAUW Postdoctoral Fellow at the University of California, Davis. before starting a faculty position at the University of Illinois in 2006.

== Research and career ==
Bell was the 2012 recipient of the Young Investigator Award from the Animal Behavior Society. Her research considers animal behavioural syndromes and their impacts. The molecular mechanisms that underpin how animals coordinate their behaviour is still unclear. In particular, Bell has studied why individual three-spined sticklebacks behave differently to one another.

She used sticklebacks as a test species to understand the changes in brain activity associated with being a parent. Bell studied male sticklebacks, which provide care to their eggs and build their nests. Bell finds the interactions between male sticklebacks and their young especially interesting because they are not the typical changes associated with female sticklebacks gestating; they occur exogenously. Bell studied the gene expression of male sticklebacks before and after becoming fathers, at three points of the hatching process. She found an overlap between the genes associated with parental care in stickleback fathers and those of maternal mice. In 2020, Bell was elected a Fellow of the American Association for the Advancement of Science. Additional honors and awards include Getz Professorial scholar in 2018, Richard and Margaret Romano Professorial Scholar in 2020, election as a Fellow in the Animal Behavior Society in 2021, the Quest Award from the Animal Behavior Society in 2022, the Campus Excellence in Guiding Undergraduate Research at U Illinois in 2023 and the Exemplar Award from the Center for the Integrative Study of Animal Behavior from Indiana University.

== Selected publications ==
- Sih, Andrew; Bell, Alison; Johnson, J.Chadwick (2004). "Behavioral syndromes: an ecological and evolutionary overview". Trends in Ecology & Evolution. 19 (7): 372–378. doi:10.1016/j.tree.2004.04.009. ISSN 0169-5347. PMID 16701288.
- Sih, Andrew; Bell, Alison M.; Chadwick-Johnson, J.; Ziemba, Robert (2004). "Behavioral Syndromes: An Integrative Overview". The Quarterly Review of Biology. 79 (3): 241–277. doi:10.1086/422893. ISSN 0033-5770. PMID 15529965. S2CID 86682784.
- Bell, Alison M.; Hankison, Shala J.; Laskowski, Kate L. (April 1, 2009). "The repeatability of behaviour: a meta-analysis". Animal Behaviour. 77 (4): 771–783. doi:10.1016/j.anbehav.2008.12.022. ISSN 0003-3472. PMC 3972767. PMID 24707058.
