= Geoff Bell =

Geoff Bell may refer to:

- Geoff Bell (rugby league) (born 1973), Australian rugby league footballer
- Geoff Bell (actor) (born 1963), British actor
- Geoffrey Bell (1939–2025), British economist and banker
- Geoffrey Bell (cricketer) (1896–1984), English cricketer and educationalist

== See also ==
- Jeffrey Bell (disambiguation)
