= Diane Bell =

Diane Bell may refer to:

- Diane Bell (anthropologist) (born 1943), Australian anthropologist
- Diane Bell (director) (21st century), Scottish film director
- Diane Bell (judoka) (born 1963), British judoka
