= Ian Spencer Bell =

American choreographer

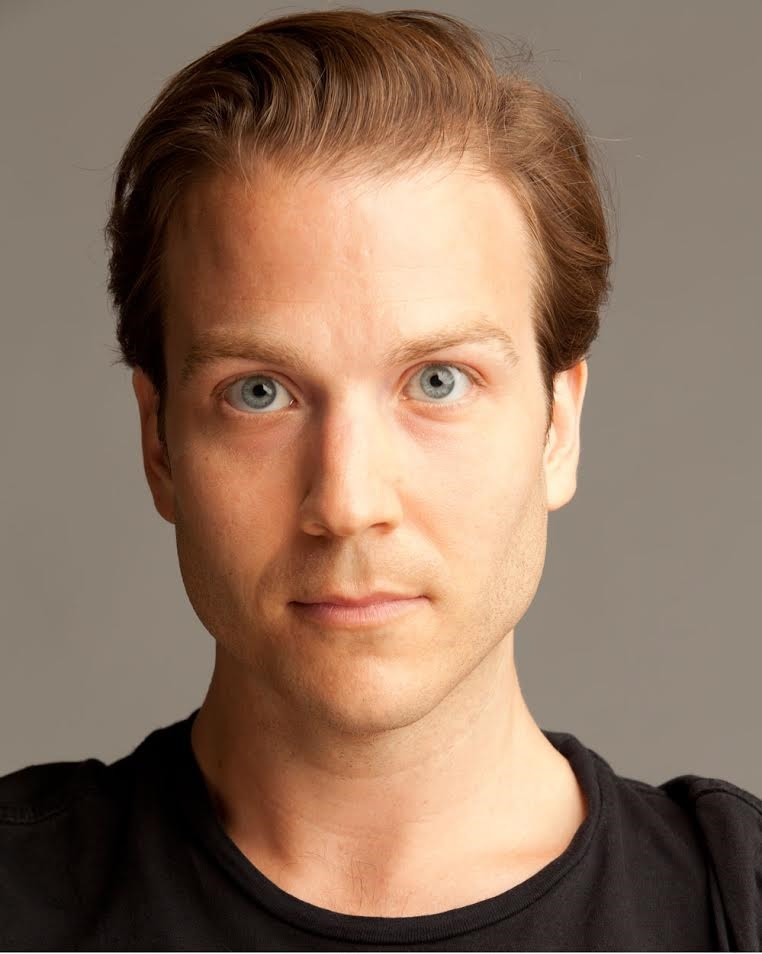
- Born: Washington, D.C.
- Education: Sarah Lawrence College; North Carolina School of the Arts
- Occupations: Dancer, choreographer, teacher, and poet
- Website: ianspencerbell.com

Ian Spencer Bell is an American dancer, choreographer, teacher, and poet best known for Marrow, a show blending elements of dance and poetry performance.

== Early life and education ==
Bell was born in Washington, D.C. in the United States. He graduated high school from North Carolina School of the Arts in Winston-Salem. In the summers, he trained at School of American Ballet, in New York City. At the age of 17, Bell moved to Seattle, Washington, to study at Pacific Northwest Ballet. He remained in the school for two years, often performing with the company. When Bell was 19, he moved to Virginia and began creating his own dance choreography.

== Career ==
In 2001, Bell was awarded a grant for his choreography from the Virginia Commission for the Arts. Two years later, he premiered his work in New York City at the National Arts Club. He has performed his solo work at the Poetry Foundation, the Queens Museum, and Jacob’s Pillow, where he has also taught and been a research fellow.

Bell has taught for American Ballet Theatre and New York City Center and is artist in residence at the Nightingale-Bamford School in New York City. His writing on dance has been published in Ballet Review and Zen Notes. In 2013, Bell graduated from the Sarah Lawrence College with a bachelor of arts degree and, in 2017, from the New York University with a masters of fine arts in poetry.
