= Michael Bell =

Michael or Mike Bell may refer to:

== Politics ==
- Michael Bell (Irish politician) (1936–2011), former Irish Labour Party politician
- Michael Bell (mayor) (born 1955), mayor of Toledo, Ohio
- Michael Dougall Bell (1943–2017), Canadian diplomat
- Michael Richard Bell, Canadian diplomat
- Mike Bell (politician) (born 1963), Republican member of the Tennessee Senate

== Sports ==
=== Baseball ===
- Mike Bell (third baseman) (1974–2021), American baseball player and coach
- Mike Bell (first baseman) (born 1968), American baseball player formerly of Atlanta Braves
- Mike Bell (baseball coach) (born 1972), American college baseball coach and former pitcher

=== Other sports ===
- Micky Bell (born 1971), English football defender
- Michael Bell (racehorse trainer) (born 1960), British racehorse trainer
- Michael Bell (cricketer) (born 1966), English cricketer
- Mike Bell (running back) (born 1983), American football player for Cleveland Browns
- Mike Bell (defensive lineman) (born 1957), former American football player for Kansas City Chiefs
- Mike Bell (bridge) (born 1984), English bridge player
- Mike Bell (wrestler) (1971–2008), American pro wrestler
- Mike Bell (basketball) (born 1982), American basketball player
- Mike Bell (motorcyclist) (1957–2021), American motorcycle racer

== Others ==
- Michael Bell (actor) (born 1938), American actor
- Michael Bell (artist) (born 1971), American artist
- Michael Mayerfeld Bell (born 1957), American sociologist and social theorist
- Michael B. T. Bell (born 1957), American enterprise software architect
- Michael Bell, Australian producer, part of Safia (band)
