= Jane Bell =

Jane Bell may refer to:

- Jane Bell (athlete) (1910–1998), Canadian track and field athlete
- Jane Bell (nurse) (1873–1959), Scottish-born Australian nurse and midwife
- Jane S. Bell (1798–1873), British illustrator
