= Martin Bell (disambiguation) =

Martin Bell (born 1938) is a British former broadcast war reporter and former independent politician.

Martin Bell may also refer to:

- Martin Bell (director) (born 1943), American filmmaker
- Martin Bell (poet) (1918–1978), British poet
- Martin Bell (racewalker), British athlete at the 1998 European Race Walking Cup
- Martin Bell (skier) (born 1964), Scottish skier
- Martin Bell (archaeologist), professor at the University of Reading, England
- Martin–Bell syndrome, or Fragile X syndrome, a genetic syndrome
- Martin Bell, member of British comedy music duo Bell & Spurling

== See also ==
- Martyn Bell (born 1964), British racing driver
