= Solon C. Bell =

American union leader (1930's)

Solon C. Bell was a union leader in the United States representing African American railroad workers. In the 1930s his actions helped unionize thousands of railroad employees. Bell and fellow organizer, Ishmael Flory, were accused of promoting communism by union leaders which resulted in them being fired and their establishment of the Dining Car and Railroad Food Workers' Union. He was brought before a congressional committee investigating communist organizing.

He was the president of the Dining Car and Railroad Food Workers' Union. Prior to being discharged in 1947 after witnesses accused him of being a communist organizer among railroadmen, he was a union leader of hotel workers and bartenders and chairman of the Joint Council of Dining Car Employees Unions which consisted of dining car unions under the jurisdiction of the Hotel and Restaurant Employees and Bartenders International Union. He refused to answer questions from a United States Senate committee investigating subversive activities and minor charges were brought against him, but he was not sentenced.

His wife, Ida Roberta Bell (1904–1992), made dolls of prominent African American historical figures and used them to teach. She was born in Nashville, Tennessee and Bell was also her maiden surname.

== See also ==
- Railway Labor Act
