= Peter Bell (footballer, born 1976) =

Australian rules footballer, born 1976

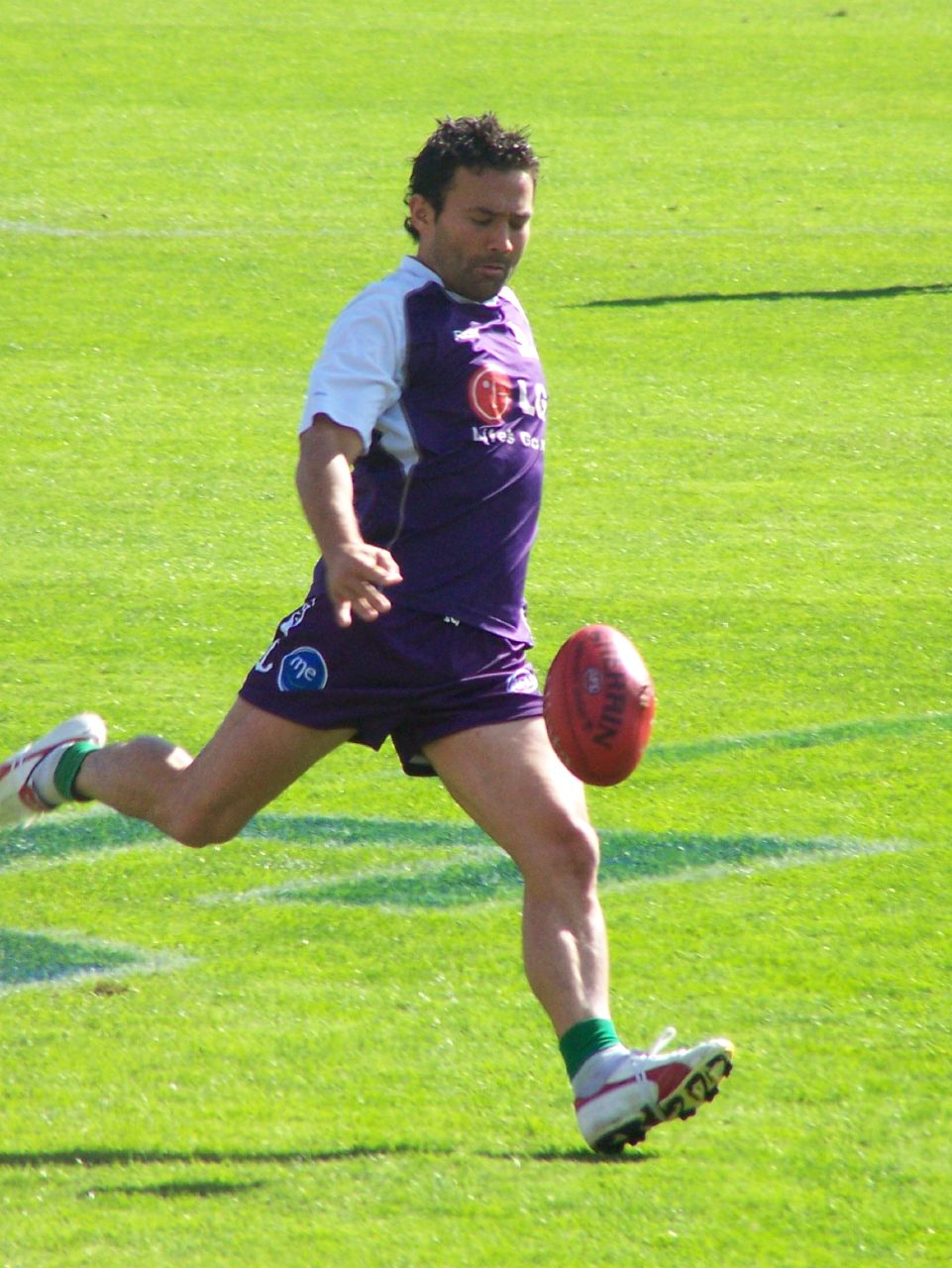

Personal information
- Full name: Peter Francis Bell
- Born: 1 March 1976 (age 50); Jeju Island, South Korea
- Original team: South Fremantle Football Club
- Height: 175 cm (5 ft 9 in)
- Weight: 81 kg (179 lb)

Playing career^{1}
Years	Club	Games (Goals)
1994-1995, 2009	South Fremantle	49 (55)
1995	Fremantle	2 (2)
1996–2000	North Melbourne	123 (120)
2001–2008	Fremantle	161 (128)
Total		345 (305)
- ^{1} Playing statistics correct to the end of 2008.

Career highlights
- Club: 2× AFL Premiership 1996, 1999; 2× All-Australian team 1999, 2003; Syd Barker Medal: 2000; 3× Doig Medal 2001, 2003, 2004; Fremantle Captain: 2002–06; Fremantle 25 since ‘95 Team; Geoff Christian Medal: 2003; Ross Glendinning Medal: 2006; South Fremantle best and fairest 1994; AFL Rising Star nominee: 1996; Fremantle Life Member: 2007; Australian Football League Life Member: 2008; Australian Football Hall of Fame; Representative: Graham Moss Medal: 1998

For information about the former St Kilda player named Peter Bell, see Peter R. Bell.

Peter Francis Bell (born 1 March 1976) is a former Australian rules footballer who played for the Fremantle Football Club and the North Melbourne Football Club in the Australian Football League. He played as a rover (or follower). A former captain of the Fremantle Football Club, Bell was twice named as a member of the All-Australian Team. He was an acclaimed ball-winner and had more than 30 possessions in a game on 39 occasions in his career.

Bell has played more games and the third-most goals of any AFL player born outside of Australia.

== Early life ==
Bell was born in Jeju Island, South Korea, the son of a Korean mother, Kyung Ae and a Native American father of Navajo descent. In 1979, he was adopted by an Australian couple who were in South Korea as Christian missionaries.

Bell spent his formative years in Kojonup, Western Australia, and began playing junior football at the age of 10 with Kojonup Cougars Junior Football Club. As well as playing, he was a regular scoreboard attendant and also boundary umpired. At the age of 13, he broke his leg which had complications and required additional resetting.

He was educated at Aquinas College, Perth, where he was a boarder. At Aquinas, he continued playing junior football from age 15 where he excelled, earning selection in the WA junior representative team. In 1994, he joined the South Fremantle Football Club and had an immediate impact being named best and fairest. Despite being considered short by AFL standards at the time he was shortly after selected in the inaugural Fremantle Dockers AFL club list drawn from the local clubs.

Bell became one of the first two players signed by the Fremantle Dockers, which made its debut in the Australian Football League the following year.

== AFL career ==
=== Fremantle (1995) ===
Despite kicking two goals with his first two kicks in AFL football, Bell failed to make an impression on Dockers' coach Gerard Neesham, who regarded him as too slow a runner to be a successful AFL player. Bell was selected for only two games in 1995.

=== North Melbourne (1996–2000) ===
He was delisted at the end of that season, worked hard to improve his leg speed, and was picked up in the 1996 Pre-season draft, by North Melbourne, where he achieved regular selection and acclaim for his courageous, energetic and skilled performances under coach Denis Pagan. Bell was a premiership player with the Kangaroos in 1996 and 1999, and was named an All-Australian on the bench in 1999. He scored four goals and had 31 possessions in the 1999 Grand Final to be one of the Roos best on the day. In 2000, he won the North Melbourne best and fairest award, the Syd Barker Medal.

=== Fremantle (2001–2008) ===
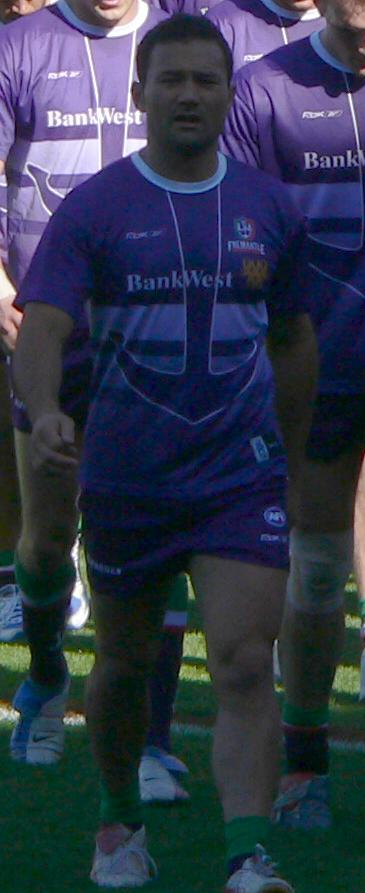
Bell leading Fremantle from the ground in 2005

At the end of 2000, Fremantle sought his return and Bell was traded back to his original club. As it happened, 2001 was a disastrous season for the Dockers, winning the "wooden spoon" and culminating in the dismissal of coach Damian Drum. Bell won the Doig Medal for the Dockers' best and fairest player that year, and was one of the very few shining lights in a season where the Dockers recorded just two victories. These two wins were in part due to outstanding performances from Bell, who gathered thirty-eight possessions and two goals against Hawthorn in round 18, and forty-four disposals and three goals against Adelaide in round 22. The following year he was appointed captain and in 2003 the club made the finals for the first time. Bell was once again an All-Australian, this time as a follower.

He continued his good form into 2004, winning another Doig Medal. However, Fremantle's team performances were not as good, and in both 2004 and 2005 they narrowly missed making the finals. 2006 started poorly, but Bell was a leading player in Freo's record setting 9-game winning streak to finish in the top four for the first time, and also a member of the team that beat Melbourne in the second semi final to record Fremantle's first ever finals game win.

Despite offering to hand over the captaincy to Matthew Pavlich in 2003, he remained captain for five seasons until the end of the 2006 season.

At Subiaco Oval, enthusiastic supporters rang a bell (a play on his surname) whenever Bell got a possession. Bell has the exact bell which was rung so enthusiastically on his sideboard in his current home. He was president of the AFL Players Association from 2003 until the beginning of 2007.

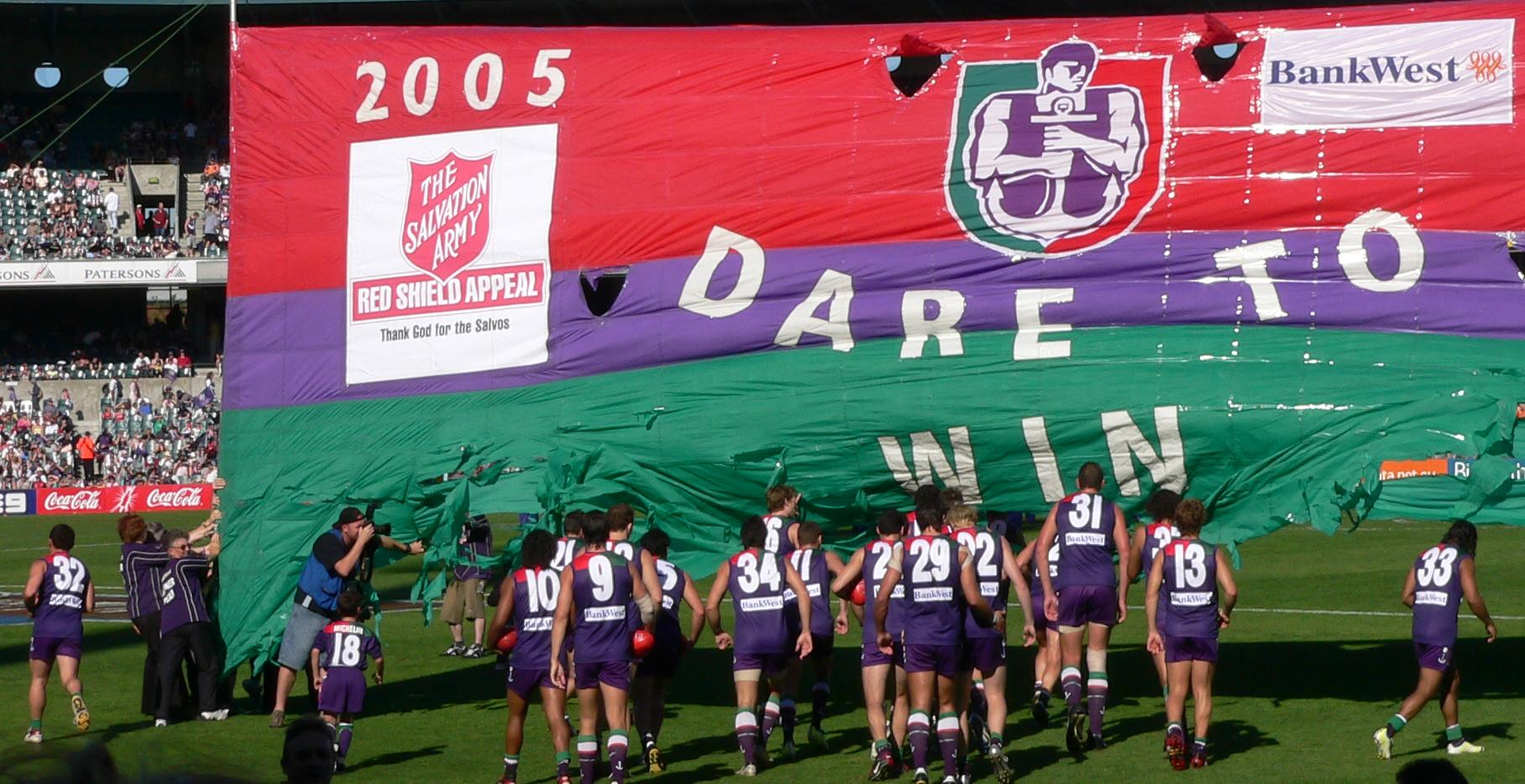
Bell (#32 at left)

Bell announced his immediate retirement on 7 July 2008, having played his last game in the club's Round 14 loss to Essendon. He played 286 games with North Melbourne and Fremantle.

=== Playing statistics ===
Season	Team	No.	Games	Totals							Averages (per game)						
Season	Team	No.	Games	G	B	K	H	D	M	T	G	B	K	H	D	M	T
1995	Fremantle	32	2	2	0	5	4	9	0	1	1.0	0.0	2.5	2.0	4.5	0.0	0.5
1996	North Melbourne	26	23	23	11	187	128	315	36	21	1.0	0.5	8.1	5.6	13.7	1.6	0.9
1997	North Melbourne	26	25	24	16	281	182	463	69	36	1.0	0.6	11.2	7.3	18.5	2.8	1.4
1998	North Melbourne	26	25	17	14	327	215	542	67	43	0.7	0.6	13.1	8.6	21.7	2.7	1.7
1999	Kangaroos	26	25	32	20	427	195	622	96	48	1.3	0.8	17.1	7.8	24.9	3.8	1.9
2000	Kangaroos	26	25	24	19	387	262	649	107	75	1.0	0.8	15.5	10.5	26.0	4.3	3.0
2001	Fremantle	32	19	14	10	313	214	527	83	52	0.7	0.5	16.5	11.3	27.7	4.4	2.7
2002	Fremantle	32	22	11	10	308	264	572	77	47	0.5	0.5	14.0	12.0	26.0	3.5	2.1
2003	Fremantle	32	23	20	9	354	242	596	111	72	0.9	0.4	15.4	10.5	25.9	4.8	3.1
2004	Fremantle	32	21	22	12	279	215	494	81	56	1.0	0.6	13.3	10.2	23.5	3.9	2.7
2005	Fremantle	32	18	12	8	251	171	422	91	69	0.7	0.4	13.9	9.5	23.4	5.1	3.8
2006	Fremantle	32	23	14	12	306	236	542	116	76	0.6	0.5	13.3	10.3	23.6	5.0	3.3
2007	Fremantle	32	22	28	12	266	218	484	102	63	1.3	0.5	12.1	9.9	22.0	4.6	2.9
2008	Fremantle	32	13	7	4	127	157	284	54	41	0.5	0.3	9.8	12.1	21.8	4.2	3.2
Career			286	250	157	3818	2703	6521	1090	700	0.9	0.5	13.3	9.5	22.8	3.8	2.4

== Post-player career ==
Bell was educated at the University of Western Australia, where he obtained a Bachelor of Laws.

In 2013, Bell joined radio broadcaster 6PR as host of the afternoon slot, alongside his match-day special comments for AFL games on the station. In 2016, he moved to ABC Radio Perth to host the weekday breakfast program. He also did some AFL coverage for the Seven Network.

In September 2018, Bell was appointed general manager of the Fremantle Football Club, and he resigned from his radio and television roles.
