= Jeff Bell (cartoonist) =

New Zealand cartoonist and caricaturist

Jeff Bell (born 16 November 1978, Timaru) is a New Zealand cartoonist and caricaturist. His work regularly appears in the Dominion Post, the Press, and other Stuff Ltd newspapers.

== Biography ==
Bell cites Murray Webb, Mad Magazine and Spitting Image as key influences on his work.

Bell has contributed regular cartoons to Stuff newspapers since 2017 and has contributed to other New Zealand publications including the Listener, the Manawatu Standard, Ashburton Guardian, Avenues magazine, Pavement magazine, and the Christchurch Mail.

Bell was named Cartoonist of the Year in 2022 at the Voyager Media Awards and was a finalist in Next in Line Young Cartoonist Award in 2013.

Bell has illustrated two children's books, The Sad Banana and The Lonely Lemon

== Exhibitions ==
- Next in line, National Library of New Zealand (2013)
- Stretching the Truth, Chamber Gallery Rangiora (2016)
- Ludicrous Likenesses, the fine art of caricature, New Zealand Portrait Gallery (2017)
- Kindness and Chaos, Chamber Gallery Rangiora (2021)
