= Manny da Camara =

South African politician

Member of the National Assembly
- In office June 1999 – April 2004
- Constituency: Mpumalanga

Personal details
- Born: Manuel Lima da Camara; 15 May 1971 (age 54)
- Citizenship: South Africa
- Party: Democratic Alliance; Democratic Party

Manuel Lima da Camara (born 15 May 1971) is a South African politician who represented the Democratic Party (DP) in the National Assembly from 1999 to 2004. He was elected in the 1999 general election and served as one of two DP representatives in the Mpumalanga constituency, as well as the Democratic Alliance's spokesman on youth affairs. He stood for re-election in the 2004 general election but was ranked seventh on the provincial list for Mpumalanga and did not secure re-election.

Da Camara speaks Portuguese. In 2022, at a civil society event in Johannesburg, he spoke in favour of electoral reform in South Africa.
