= Grace Alatta Bell =

Bermudian politician

Grace Alatta Bell was a member of the parliament of Bermuda for the United Bermuda Party for the constituency of St George's South. She was chairperson of the Bermuda Nursing Council.
