= Hilary Bell (television producer) =

Hilary Bell (20 August 1965 – 2010) was a pioneer of British reality television whose commissions for Channel 4 include Faking It and Wife Swap.

== Early life and education ==
Hilary Bell was born in Fareham, Hampshire. She attended Rookesbury Park School, Petworth and Portsmouth High School for Girls. She later studied at Trinity College, Cambridge, reading law.

== Career ==
Bell worked as a researcher at the BBC and was involved in broadcast journalism such as the undercover investigation into the Hoover free flights promotion in 1992. She went on to work with Peter Dale on the BAFTA-nominated series The System in 1996, contributing greatly to the success of the series. Bell also worked as a director on Vets in Practice.

In 1999, she was appointed Deputy Commissioning Editor for Documentaries at Channel 4. In this position and then as Commissioning Editor, she worked with series such as Wife Swap, Faking It and Cutting Edge and single programmes such as the 2001 Brian's Story.
