= Gordon Bell (singer-songwriter) =

Scottish singer-songwriter

Gordon Bell (born 24 July 1969) is a Scottish singer-songwriter based in Basel, Switzerland.

== Background ==
He released fifteen albums. Nine of those albums were under the pseudonym Gustav Bertha. His breakthrough fifth album My Life as a Dog (distributed in Switzerland through RecRec) was well received: Swiss newspaper Der Bund called it 'Wunderbar'. The Swiss press has also dubbed him with the slightly more ambiguous title, "The World's least-known Scot". He stopped working under the Gustav Bertha pseudonym in 2008 to write and play as Gordon Bell. Bell's music could be compared to a strange cross between fellow Glaswegians Ivor Cutler and Alex Harvey. He has a penchant for storytelling in his songs. He also spent 15 years as lead singer with a tribute to The Sensational Alex Harvey Band – Not The Sensational Alex Harvey Band and now fronts the rock band Giant Stone Eater who play a mix of covers (especially songs connected with Alex Harvey) and Bell's own songs.

== Discography ==
Year	Artist	Title	Ref
1991	One in Five	Five Flew Over the Hatchery	
1993	Psychoannie	Amoeba	
1999	plasticpsychobabble	StranGe enchantment	
2000	plasticpsychobabble	submerging meadows green boundaries	
2000	plasticpsychobabble	blurred visions for fuzzy strangers	
2000	The Secret Life of Andrew Aston	Caffeine Injunction	
2001	Gustav Bertha	Songs for Gigi	
2002	Gustav Bertha	The Hose Room	
2002	Gustav Bertha	Café Crème	
2003	Gustav Bertha	babble	
2004	Gustav Bertha	My Life as a Dog	
2005	Gustav Bertha	Defective	
2006	Gustav Bertha	z:06 (compilation)	
2007	Gustav Bertha	small adventures in the great domestic wilderness	
2008	Gustav Bertha	True North	
2009	Gordon Bell	Songs for the Broken Hearted	
2010	Gordon Bell	The Lost Art of Penance	
2011	Gordon Bell	The 12 Uses of a Dead Tape Cassette	
2011	Gordon Bell and the Sinking Ships	Animal Kingdom	
2012	Gordon Bell	A Day Trip to the Sea	
