= Trevor Bell =

Trevor Bell may refer to:

- Trevor Bell (artist) (1930–2017), English painter
- Trevor Bell (baseball) (born 1986), American baseball pitcher
