= Dennis Bell (footballer) =

Australian rules footballer

Personal information
- Full name: Dennis Bell
- Born: 15 September 1940 (age 86)
- Original team: Walpeup
- Height: 180 cm (5 ft 11 in)
- Weight: 79 kg (174 lb)

Playing career^{1}
Years	Club	Games (Goals)
1961	Collingwood	2 (1)
- ^{1} Playing statistics correct to the end of 1961.

Dennis Bell (born 15 September 1940) is a former Australian rules footballer who played with Collingwood in the Victorian Football League (VFL).
