= Edith Anna Bell =

Irish artist (1870–1929)

- Born: 1870; Dublin, Ireland
- Died: 1929 (aged 58–59); Ireland
- Known for: Sculptor

Edith Anna Bell (1870–1929) was an Irish sculptor who specialised in creating medallions and portraits in relief.

== Biography ==
Bell was born in Dublin and after taking art lessons in that city appears to have moved to England, sometime before 1896 when she is known to have been teaching modelling at the Central School of Arts and Crafts in London. She is also known to have lived at Reading in Berkshire for a time. Bell produced bronze figures and statuettes and also medallions in both bronze and silver. Between 1896 and 1912 she exhibited ten works at the Royal Academy in London and also exhibited at the Walker Art Gallery in Liverpool. The National Portrait Gallery in London holds a copper medallion portrait of Alfred Harmsworth, 1st Viscount Northcliffe by Bell.
