= Terry Bell =

Terry Bell may refer to:

- Terry Bell (baseball) (born 1962), American baseball player
- Terry Bell (footballer) (1944–2014), English footballer
