= Josh Bell =

Josh Bell may refer to:

- Josh Bell (gridiron football) (born 1985), American football and Canadian football cornerback
- Josh Bell (third baseman) (born 1986), American baseball third baseman
- Josh Bell (first baseman) (born 1992), American baseball first baseman

== See also ==
- Joshua Bell (disambiguation)
