= Derek Bell =

Derek Bell may refer to:

== Sports ==
- Derek Bell (baseball) (born 1968), American baseball player
- Derek Bell (footballer, born 1956), English former professional footballer
- Derek Bell (footballer, born 1963), English former professional footballer
- Derek Bell (racing driver) (born 1941), British racing car driver

== Other ==
- Derek Bell (musician) (1935–2002), Northern Irish musician and composer
- Derek Bell (physician), professor of acute medicine

== See also ==
- Derrick Bell (1930–2011), American lawyer, professor, and civil rights activist
