= Joshua Bell (shoe manufacturer) =

Canadian businessman

Joshua Bell (c. 1812 – 24 December 1863) was born in Ireland and immigrated to Canada with his brother and father somewhere between 1815 and 1825.

The father, Alexander, was a shoemaker and the family became successful in that business. After the father's death, the two brothers expanded the business with Joshua taking the lead role. By his death, their company, J. and T. Bell was one of the larger footwear factories in Montreal. In the 1861, it had 70 employees.

Joshua was important to the economic history of the time in that he was a pioneer of mechanization of shoe production in Canada.
