= Charles Rattray (cricketer) =

New Zealand cricketer

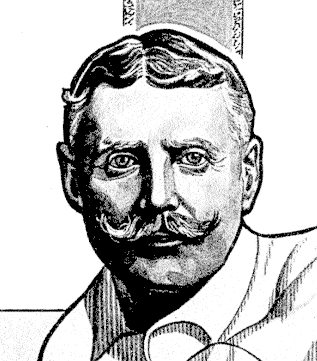
- Rattray portrayed in the Otago Witness in 1915

Personal information
- Full name: Charles William Rattray
- Born: 9 July 1863; Dunedin, New Zealand
- Died: 8 June 1939 (aged 75); Dunedin, New Zealand

Domestic team information
- Years: Team
- 1883/84–1896/97: Otago

Career statistics
Competition	First-class
Matches	12
Runs scored	153
Batting average	9.56
100s/50s	0/0
Top score	23
Catches/stumpings	4/–
- Source: Cricinfo, 17 February 2019

Charles William Rattray (9 July 1863 – 8 June 1939) was a New Zealand cricketer. He played twelve first-class matches for Otago between the 1883–84 and 1896–97 seasons.

Rattray was born at Dunedin and educated at Otago Boys' High School in the city and at Christ's College, Christchurch. He was "a free and stylish batsman, with a fine off drive", but his batting success at first-class level was limited, with a top score of 23. He was, however, a successful captain of Otago for several years. As well as cricket, he also played rugby union for the provincial team.

Rattray was a prominent businessman in Dunedin. He was chairman of directors of the wholesale grocery and spirits company founded by his father, and served on the boards of several major national companies. He was also vice-consul for Portugal for over 30 years. He married Gertrude Emeline Neill in Dunedin on 5 February 1896. They had a son and a daughter. He died at Dunedin in 1939 aged 75.
