= Steve Bell (soccer) =

American soccer player (born 1975)

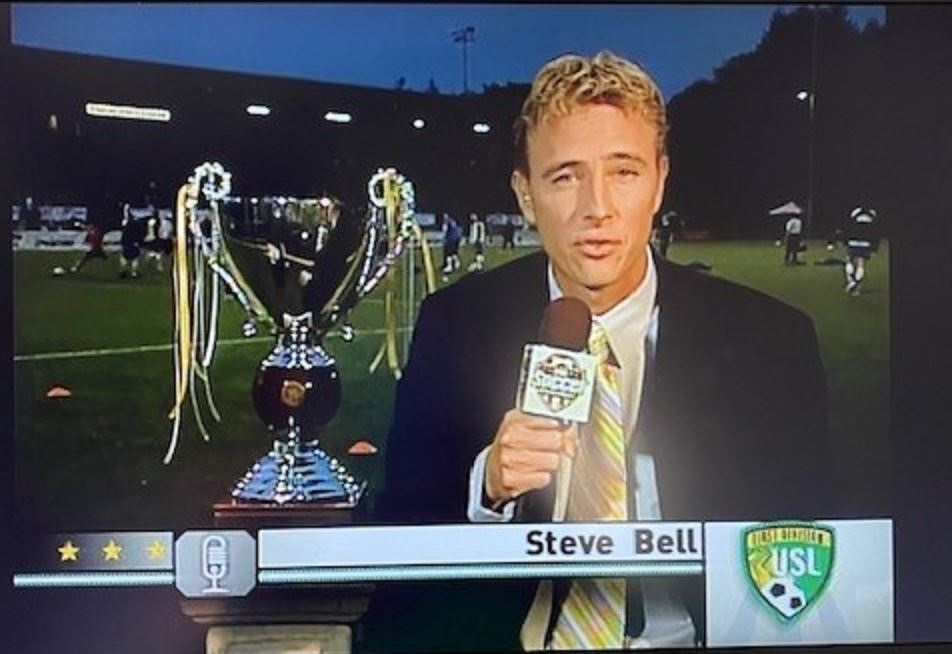
- Steve Bell in 2008, reporting during the 2008 USL First Division Final.

Personal information
- Date of birth: January 7, 1975 (age 51)
- Place of birth: United States
- Height: 6 ft 1 in (1.85 m)
- Position: Midfielder

Youth career
- 1993–1996: Robert Morris Colonials

Senior career*
Years	Team	Apps	(Gls)
1997	Washington Warthogs (indoor)		(2)
1998	Tampa Bay Mutiny	0	(0)
1999	Pittsburgh Riverhounds	21	(0)
- * Club domestic league appearances and goals

Steve Bell (born January 7, 1975) is an American retired soccer midfielder who played professionally in the Continental Indoor Soccer League and USL A-League. He is a play-by-play soccer broadcaster and sideline reporter for the Fox Soccer Channel.

== Youth ==
Bell graduated from Peters Township High School. He attended the Robert Morris University, playing on the men's soccer team from 1993 to 1996. Robert Morris won the Northeast Conference Regular Season title in 1995 with a perfect 8–0 conference record. Bell finished the season with 6 goals and 9 assists (2nd most in the Northeast Conference).

== Professional ==
In 1997, Bell played for the Washington Warthogs of the Continental Indoor Soccer League. He finished the season with two goals and three assists. That winter, he played as a trialist with the Tampa Bay Mutiny. On February 1, 1998, the Mutiny selected him in the second round (nineteenth overall) of the 1998 MLS Supplemental Draft. The Mutiny released him on June 10, 1998, to free a roster spot for Evans Wise. In February 1999, he signed with the expansion Pittsburgh Riverhounds of the USL A-League. He was a regular starter, but injuries led to his retirement. In 2000, he began working in sales in Akron, Ohio, but also worked as a part-time game announcer for Riverhounds’ games on Fox Sports Radio. In November 2003, Bell and his broadcasting partner, Chris Shovlin, won the March of Dimes Achievement in Radio Award for Best Play-by-Play. In 2006, Bell was named as the Voice of the United Soccer Leagues and was the play-by-play announcer for every game featured on Fox Soccer Channel during the season. In 2007, he was named as the host for the thirty-minute feature show, USL Breakaway on Fox Soccer. In addition to his Play-by-Play duties for the USL and the NSCAA Game of the Week, he was also back in Major League Soccer from 2008 to 2010 as a sideline reporter for Fox Soccer Channel.
