= Malcolm Bell (cricketer) =

English cricketer

Personal information
- Full name: Robert Malcolm Hamilton Bell
- Born: 26 February 1969 (age 57); Hugh Town, Isles of Scilly, England
- Batting: Right-handed
- Bowling: Right-arm medium

Domestic team information
- Years: Team
- 1990–1993: Cornwall
- 1990–1991: Gloucestershire

Career statistics
Competition	First-class	List A
Matches	3	1
Runs scored	0	–
Batting average	0.00	–
100s/50s	0/0	–
Top score	0*	–
Balls bowled	294	24
Wickets	3	0
Bowling average	41.00	–
5 wickets in innings	0	–
10 wickets in match	0	–
Best bowling	2/38	–
Catches/stumpings	0/–	0/–
- Source: Cricinfo, 30 July 2011

Robert Malcolm Hamilton Bell (born 26 February 1969) is a former English cricketer. He was a right-handed batsman who bowled right-arm medium pace. He was born in Hugh Town on the Isles of Scilly.

Bell made his debut in county cricket for Cornwall County Cricket Club in the 1990 MCCA Knockout Trophy against Wiltshire. In that same season he made his first-class debut for Gloucestershire against Glamorgan in the 1990 County Championship. He made two further first-class appearances, against Worcestershire in 1990 and Oxford University in 1991. In his three first-class matches, he took 3 wickets at an average of 41.00, with best figures of 2/38. Bell also made a single List A appearance for Gloucestershire, which came in 1990 against Yorkshire in the Refuge Assurance League. He continued to play Minor counties cricket for Cornwall until the 1993 season, by which time he had made 11 Minor Counties Championship appearances and three MCCA Knockout Trophy appearances.
