= Brian Bell (American football) =

American football player and coach (born 1984)

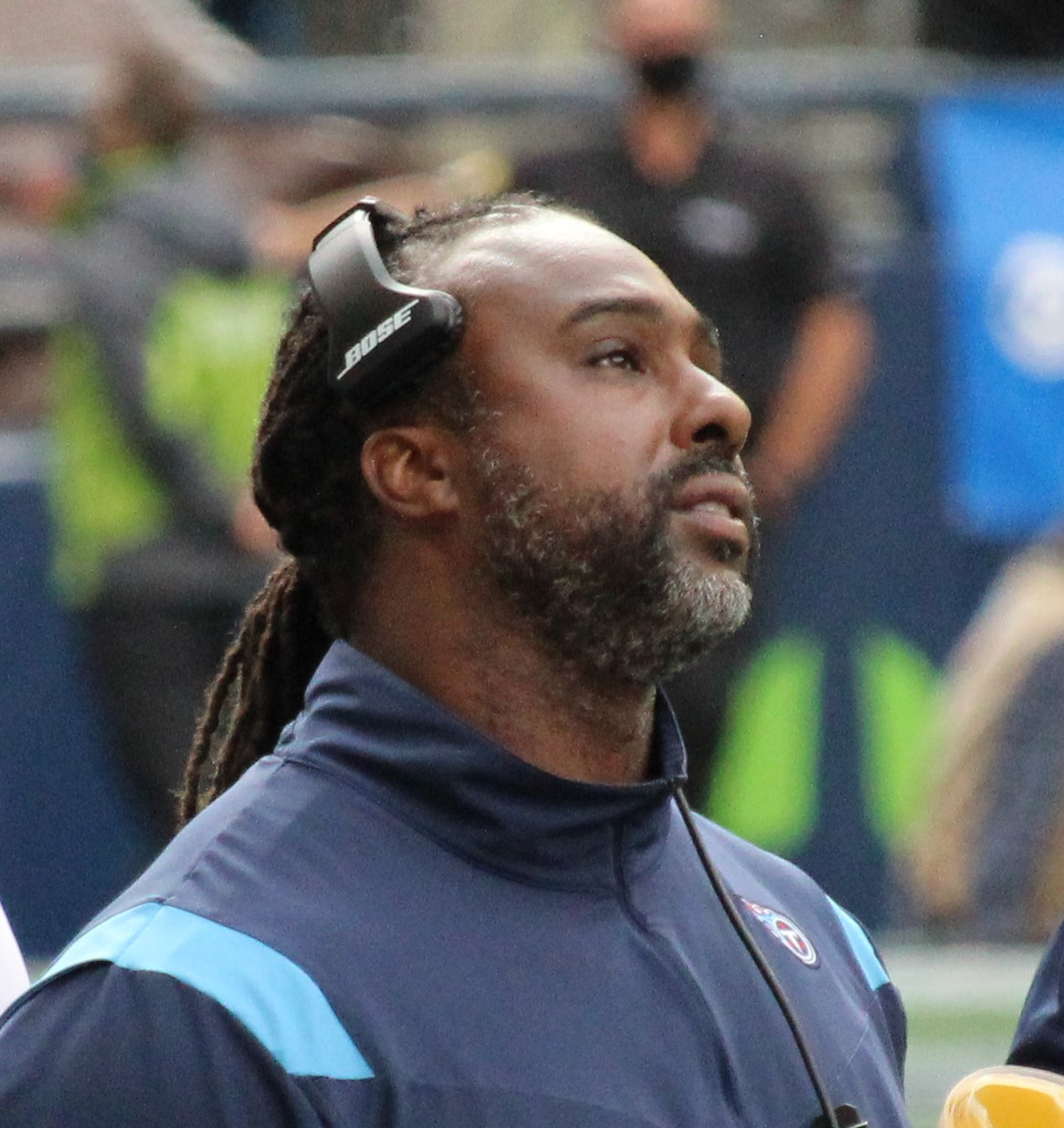
- Bell with the Tennessee Titans in 2021

Tennessee Titans
- Title: Assistant director of sports performance

Personal information
- Born: April 4, 1984 (age 42); Kettering, Maryland, U.S.
- Listed height: 6 ft 2 in (1.88 m)
- Listed weight: 238 lb (108 kg)

Career information
- Positions: Fullback, tight end
- College: Kent State
- NFL draft: 2007: undrafted

Career history

Playing
- Washington Redskins (2007)*
- * Offseason or practice squad member only

Coaching
- Penn State (2012–2013) Assistant strength and conditioning coach; Houston Texans (2015–2017) Assistant strength and conditioning coach; Tennessee Titans (2018–2024) Assistant strength and conditioning coach; Tennessee Titans (2024–present) Assistant director of sports performance

Brian Bell (born April 4, 1984) is an American former football fullback and tight end. He is currently the assistant director of sports performance for the Tennessee Titans. He previously filled this role with the Nittany Lions and the Texans.

== College career ==
While at Kent State, Bell played in 32 games and totaled 60 catches for 654 yards with five touchdowns.

== Professional career ==
Bell was signed by the Washington Redskins on May 15, 2007. He was released by the Redskins on October 16, 2007.

== Personal life ==
Brian and his wife, Crystal, have three children.
