= Ian Bell (literaturist) =

British academic (born 1947)

Ian Frederick Andrew Bell (born 31 October 1947) is a British academic specialising in the works of Ezra Pound and Henry James. He has been Professor of American Literature at the University of Keele since 1992.

== Books ==
- Bell, Ian F. A. (1981). Critic as scientist: the modernist poetics of Ezra Pound. London; New York: Methuen. ISBN 0416313507.
- Bell, Ian. F.A., ed. (1982). Ezra Pound: tactics for reading. London: Vision Press. ISBN 9780389202837.
- Bell, Ian F.A., ed. (1985). Henry James: fiction as history. London: Rowman & Littlefield Publishers. ISBN 9780389205159.
- Adams, D.K.; Bell, Ian F. A., eds. (1989). American literary landscapes: the fiction and the fact. London : New York: Vision; St. Martin's Press. ISBN 0312024215.
- Bell, Ian F. A. (1991). Henry James and the Past: Readings into Time. Palgrave Macmillan. ISBN 9781349080564.
- Bell, Ian F. A. (1993). Washington Square: styles of money. New York: Twayne Publishers. ISBN 0805783598.
