= Ernest Bell (footballer) =

English footballer

Personal information
- Full name: Ernest Bell
- Position: Forward

Senior career*
Years	Team	Apps	(Gls)
1891–1892	Notts County	6	(0)
- * Club domestic league appearances and goals

Ernest Bell was an English footballer who played in the Football League for Notts County.
