= Roy Bell (rugby league) =

Australian rugby league footballer

Personal information
- Full name: Roy Bell
- Born: 30 August 1984 (age 42) Sydney, New South Wales, Australia
- Height: 165 cm (5 ft 5 in)
- Weight: 65 kg (10 st 3 lb)

Playing information
- Position: Wing, Fullback
Club
Years	Team	Pld	T	G	FG	P
2004–05	South Sydney	9	7	1	0	30

Roy Bell (born 30 August 1984) is an Australian former rugby league footballer who played as a winger for the South Sydney Rabbitohs in the NRL between 2004 and 2005.

== Background ==
Bell was born in Sydney, New South Wales, Australia.

== Career ==
Bell made his first grade debut for South Sydney in round 23 2004 against North Queensland at the Willows Sports Complex. Bell scored a try in a 22–36 loss.

Bell's final game in the top grade came during the 2005 NRL season against St. George Illawarra in round 15 at the Sydney Cricket Ground.

Despite scoring 7 tries in only 9 games, Bell departed South Sydney at the age of only 20. He was released from his South Sydney contract and returned to the North Coast of New South Wales in 2005 after not adjusting to life in Sydney and becoming homesick.

In this time Bell developed a cult following among rugby league fans because of his tiny frame and his skinny (even relative to his body) legs. At 65 kg, Bell was even smaller than Preston Campbell (74 kg), another Aboriginal player famed for his slight frame. His ability to tackle players twice his size was seen as a throwback to the days of Norm Provan and Arthur Summons.

After departing from Souths, Bell continued to play rugby league in the local North Coast competition for Casino and Northern United. He then went on to play for South Grafton and won a group 2 premiership with them in 2015.

== Controversy ==
In 2005, Bell was stood down by South Sydney after being convicted of drink driving. South Sydney CEO Shane Richardson spoke to the media saying "Roy is a fine young player but he has made a grave mistake in this instance and we will speak with him and his manager over the weekend about this incident".
