= Ryan J. Bell =

American former Seventh-day Adventist pastor

Ryan Bell
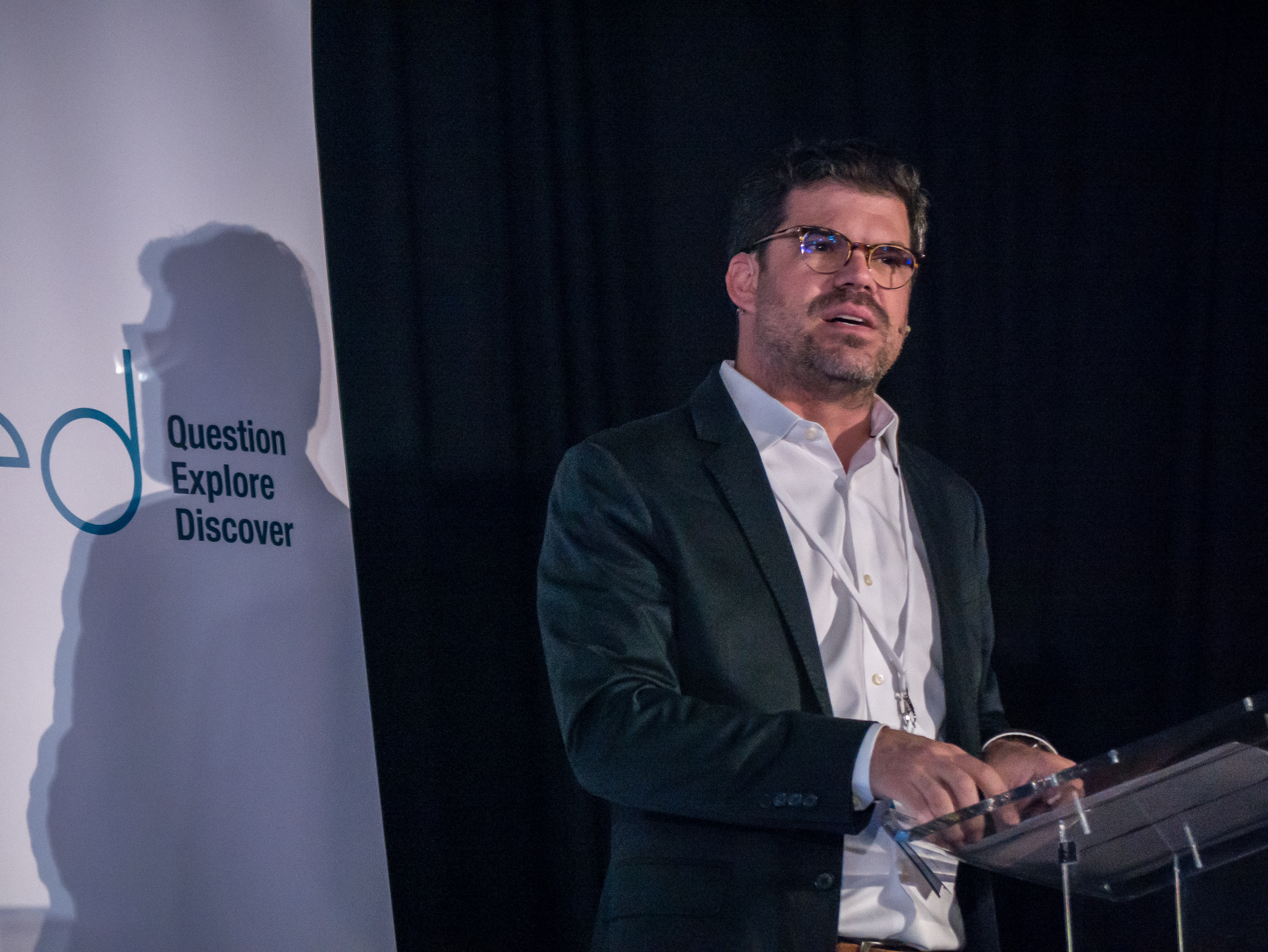
- Bell speaking at QED Conference in Manchester, UK in 2015
- Born: September 26, 1971 (age 54); Parma, Ohio, U.S.
- Education: Weimar Institute
- Known for: Former pastor, who spent 2014 living as an atheist
- Spouse: Divorced
- Children: 2

Emery Emery interviews Bell after preview of "Year Without God" at LogiCalLA 2017

Ryan J. Bell (born September 26, 1971) is an American former Seventh-day Adventist pastor who became an atheist after spending a "year without God" as an experiment. He has publicly spoken about his experiences before, during, and after this year, and he wrote about it in his blog "Year Without God" (later hosted by Patheos). He is a regular contributor at The Huffington Post and, in August 2015, he launched a new blog and podcast "Life After God." He currently serves as the National Organizing Manager for the Secular Student Alliance and as the Humanist Chaplain at the University of Southern California.

== Early life ==
Bell was born in Parma, Ohio, and spent his childhood in Loma Linda, a California suburb largely populated by Seventh-day Adventists. Growing up, Bell was strictly religious. He was baptized when he was nine years old and not long after that his parents got divorced and he moved with his mother to live in southern Oregon. Bell lived with his grandparents, who were very faithful, traditional Adventists, during his high school years. That had a great effect on Bell, who became very conservative in his faith. Because his grandparents were volunteers at Weimar Institute at the time, Bell decided to transfer there during his junior year. He later served at the Covelo Church in the Northern California Conference, where Doug Batchelor was a pastor, and he did some ministry alongside Batchelor. After finishing at Weimar, Bell went to work for the Pennsylvania Conference where he realized that "my harsh ideology was bumping up against real life. I realized that God is not as much about ideas as he is about people. I knew that if I didn't love people, then I couldn't do my ministry."

== Career as a pastor ==
When Bell started his career as a pastor, he learned that his congregation did not follow the Adventist religious laws to the letter. They wore makeup and jewelry and some smoked, all of which went against what Bell believed a true Adventist should be like. He realized "my ideology clashed with real people", and he decided not to exclude them. Bell became liberal in his views and opened his church to those who were not sure about organized religion. He became an advocate of social justice, advocating for gay rights and marriage equality.

In 2010, the Hollywood Adventist Church, where Bell was pastor at the time, won the "2010 Innovative Church of the Year" award. During his time as pastor, his church took part in many different social initiatives and charities, such as One Mile Mission, in which church members took responsibility for the well-being of every person within a one-mile radius; LA Voice, a faith-based organization which seeks to improve local communities through social change; and Imagine LA, which helps congregations mentor families coming out of homelessness. In March 2013, Bell was forced to resign from his position as a pastor, after he had argued in favor of ordination of women and the rights of homosexuals. According to Bell, the gap between him and his fellow clergymen had also widened due to his efforts for peace, justice, and interfaith dialogue, which were constantly met with resistance.

== A Year Without God ==
After being a Seventh-day Adventist pastor for 19 years, Bell announced his 'A Year Without God' experiment on December 31, 2013, on his Huffington Post blog. The idea came from the question that Bell's friend once asked him: "What difference does God make?" He decided to find out by living the year without God. "For the next 12 months I will live as if there is no God. I will not pray, read the Bible for inspiration, refer to God as the cause of things or hope that God might intervene and change my own or someone else's circumstances." Right after stating his intention, Bell lost his position and income at two Christian universities, Azusa Pacific University and Fuller Theological Seminary. In response, an early critic of the experiment, "Friendly Atheist" blogger Hemant Mehta, started a fundraising campaign among atheists to support Bell. The effort garnered $17,000 in its first few days.

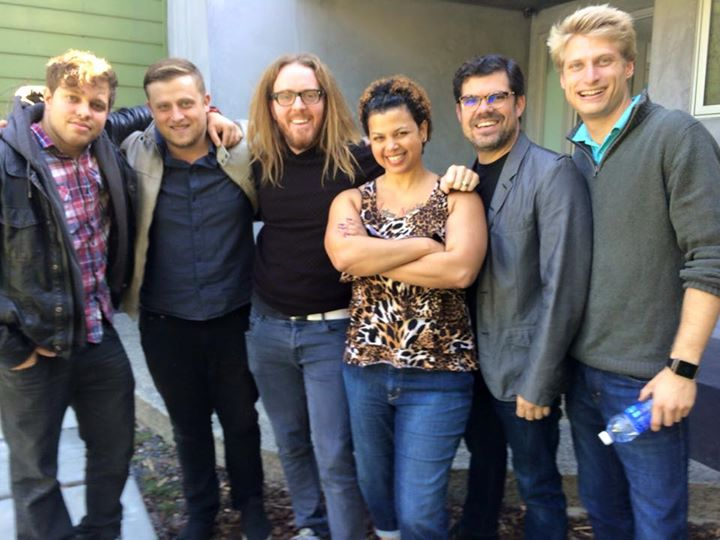
Tim Minchin, Heather Henderson, Ryan Bell and the film crew of A Year Without God

The campaign raised over $27,000 to help Bell to support his family during his unemployment.

The decision to live a year without God was met by criticism from faith-based communities. Christianity Today published an article, in which they criticized Bell's idea: "this notion that he can turn his faith off for one calendar year, then flip the switch back should he so desire strikes me as strange," wrote Laura Turner. In an interview on the CBC Radio Tapestry podcast, Bell responded to some of the criticism by saying that he understands the position of "you either believe in God or not", but he also believes that people should be able to try things out, go wherever your questions lead you, pursue your own truth. On this podcast Bell also talks about how his life was affected by his decision to live without God. He said that his "life hasn't changed that much", he is not praying or reading the Bible but other than that he was always "a feet on the ground" pastor.

In April 2014, Bell attended the American Atheists National Convention in Salt Lake City. When asked how his journey into atheism was faring, he stated,

It is still very confusing. I do still think faith is very understandable. And I would be fine to return to it. But with another part of my mind, I'm constantly puncturing holes in it. There is also a cost-benefit analysis to it. Religion is beautiful, but it can also encourage violence, and taking away the rights of others. Especially the monotheistic religions; they claim the exclusive truth.

== Life After God podcast ==
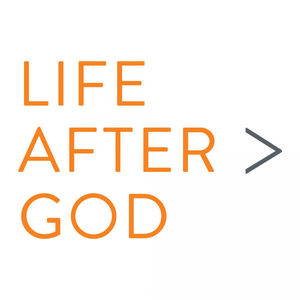
Life After God logo.

In August 2015, Bell launched the Life After God podcast, to discuss his and other people's apostasy, and how they live their lives now without religion. The podcast is part of the broader project Life After God, which serves to provide a "safe, hospitable space for people to explore their doubts, recalibrate their ‘moral compass’, and create new friendships."
