= Thomas Cowan Bell =

American educator and fraternity founder

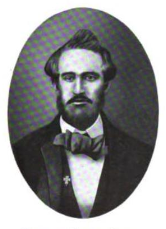
- Born: May 14, 1832; Bellbrook, Ohio, U.S.
- Died: February 3, 1919 (aged 86); Oakley, California, U.S.
- Burial place: San Francisco National Cemetery
- Education: Miami University
- Occupations: College president, educator, and publisher
- Known for: Founding Sigma Chi

Thomas Cowan Bell (May 14, 1832 – February 3, 1919) was an American college president, educator, newspaper publisher, and Civil War veteran. He is best known for being one of the founders of Sigma Chi fraternity.

== Early life ==
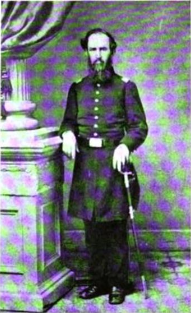
Bell in his Civil War uniform

Thomas Cowan Bell was born May 14, 1832, in Bellbrook, Ohio. He grew up on a farm and his primary school education was in log schoolhouses.

He attended Miami University in the fall of 1854. Bell and six other students founded the Sigma Chi fraternity on June 25, 1855. At the age of 23, he was considered to be an "elder statesman" of the fraternity.

While a student at Miami, Bell lived in the Oxford, Ohio home of his Aunt Lizzie Davis. Because all of the other members of the fraternity at one time or another lived in Aunt Lizzie's place or took meals there, her house became known as "the first Chapter house of Sigma Chi." She eventually allowed all seven members to move into her house and hired two cooks from Cincinnati to accommodate the men.

At Miami University, Bell was also a member of the Eccritian literary society and was considered "one of the principle orators of the university". He delivered the commencement speech when he graduated with an A.B. in 1857. He received an A.M. from Miami University in 1859.

With the start of the Civil War in 1861, Bell enlisted as a private in the 74th Ohio Infantry of the United States Army; he was a lieutenant colonel in less than a year. He received a high commendation for leading the regiment's bayonet charge at the Battle of Stone River. He served in the military through 1863, retiring with the rank of major.

== Career ==
After college, Bell became a teacher. Following the Civil War he returned to education, serving as the superintendent of school system in Nobles County, Minnesota, from 1872 to 1877. He was the County Record or Deeds and became the editor and publisher of the newspaper, Journal, in Worthington, Minnesota from 1878 to 1885.

From 1885 to 1886, he was the president of Philomath College in Oregon. Next, he was the principal of La Creole Academy in Dallas, Oregon from 1887 to 1892. He was president of Central Oregon State Normal School in Drain, Oregon from 1892 to 1896. He retired from teaching in 1896.

== Personal life ==
Bell was married to Sigourney White of Oxford in 1857. He married his second wife, Lucia Chase, in 1866. He had five boys and two girls between the two marriages. He was the Oregon adjunct for the Grand Army of the Republic. After he retired, Bell retired to Oakland, California.

Late in life, he renewed his connection to the Sigma Chi fraternity. Bell attended Sigma Chi's semi-centennial celebration in Oxford, Ohio in 1905. He was also involved with the Alpha Beta chapter at the University of California at Berkeley.

He died in his home in Oakland on February 3, 1919, the day after attending an initiation ceremony of the Alpha Beta chapter. He was 87 years old. He is buried at the San Francisco National Cemetery, located in the Presidio of San Francisco.

His son, Donald J. Bell, was initiated into Sigma Chi in June 1930.

== Honors ==
- In 1905, Sigma Chi presented Bell with a souvenir medal as an expression of its "love and gratitude" at the fraternity's semi-centennial celebration.
- In 1933, Sigma Chi erected and dedicated a Founders' Memorial Monument in the San Francisco National Cemetery where Bell is buried.
- Bell is the namesake of the Thomas Cowan Bell Scholastic Foundation, located in San Jose, California, which awards college scholarships to both members of the Sigma Chi fraternity and students of San Jose State University
- Bell is the namesake of the Thomas Cowan Bell Sigma Chi Scholarship for both members and non-members of Sigma Chi at the University of Nebraska–Lincoln.
- The Thomas Cowan Bell Teaching Award is presented annually by the Ohio State chapter of Sigma Chi.
- Sigma Chi chapters with the most active alumni donors are given the name of "Bell Chapters" in honor of Thomas Cowan Bell.
