= Stephen Bell =

English footballer

Stephen Bell (13 March 1965 – 21 April 2001) was an English professional footballer who played as a winger.

He made his debut for Middlesbrough aged 16 years and 323 days against Southampton on 30 January 1982 in the Football League First Division, making him the joint youngest player to appear in a competitive game for the club. He played a total of 85 first team appearances for Middlesbrough, mostly after their relegation to the Football League Second Division at the end of the 1981–82. Brief spells with Darlington and Whitby Town followed.

He died 21 April 2001, aged 36.
