= Ernest Arthur Bell =

English botanist and chemist

Ernest Arthur Bell CB (20 June 1926 – 11 June 2006) was an English botanist and chemist who was Director of the Royal Botanic Gardens, Kew from 1981 to 1988, the first biochemist to be appointed to the post.

== Early life ==
Arthur Bell was born at Gosforth, Northumberland and was educated at Dame Allan's School, Newcastle upon Tyne. He took a degree in Chemistry at Durham University and was awarded a doctorate at Trinity College Dublin in 1950.

== Professional career ==
Bell started his career at ICI in 1946, as a research chemist. In 1947 he took up a research post at Trinity College, Dublin. In 1949 he became a lecturer in Biochemistry at King's College London, where he became Professor of Biology and head of the Department of Plant Sciences in 1972. He was vice-president of the Linnean Society from 1982 to 1986.

== Honours ==
He was appointed a Companion of The Most Honourable Order of the Bath in 1987. In 1990 he was made an honorary fellow of Trinity College Dublin.

== Personal life ==
He married Jean Ogilvie in 1952 and they had three children together – two sons and a daughter.

== Death ==
He died at St George's Hospital, Tooting in 2006, aged 79.
