= Ian Bell (journalist) =

Scottish journalist & author (1956–2015)

- Born: 7 January 1956; Edinburgh, Scotland
- Died: 10 December 2015 (aged 59); Coldingham, Scotland
- Education: University of Edinburgh
- Occupations: Journalist and writer

Ian Bell (7 January 1956 – 10 December 2015) was a Scottish journalist and author who won the Orwell Prize for political journalism in 1997. Over a thirty-year career he wrote for and edited: The Scotsman, The Herald, The Sunday Herald, the Daily Record and The Times Literary Supplement. He was named Scotland's columnist of the year four times between 2000 and 2012. He completed three books- two volumes on Bob Dylan and a biography of Robert Louis Stevenson.

== Early life ==
Ian Mackay Bell was born on 7 January 1956 in Edinburgh, Scotland. His father was Ian Bell, a fireman on steam trains and a trade unionist. His mother was Helen Bell (née Mackay), a personnel worker with Edinburgh city water board. He lived on the Magdalene council estate and attended Portobello High School. He studied English Literature and Philosophy at the University of Edinburgh where he graduated with an honours degree. He was a great-great-nephew of James Connolly, the Irish revolutionary.

== Career ==
Bell applied to a graduate trainee scheme at The Scotsman but instead joined the newspaper in 1978 as a library assistant and shortly after became a sub-editor. He also wrote articles for the paper on rock and pop music, from the end of the seventies until 1986, when he became the literary editor. He was an active member of the National Union of Journalists, where he was Father of the Chapel, a role equivalent to shop steward. After a labour dispute where journalists were locked out, he left the Scotsman in 1987.

He next worked as sub-editor at The Herald and The Sunday Herald. As a freelancer, he also wrote for The Scotsman. In the late 1990s he worked at the Daily Record, having been persuaded by the editor Martin Clarke. He also worked on The Times Literary Supplement. He worked as the editor of the Scottish edition of The Observer 1988–1990. Bell was an advocate of Scottish independence over the course of his career.

Bell wrote a biography of Robert Louis Stevenson, Dreams of Exile which was published by Mainstream Publishing in November 1992. He wrote a two-volume biography of Bob Dylan. Once Upon A Time is a 590-page work which covers Dylan's career up to and including his fifteenth studio album "Blood on the Tracks". The second volume Time Out of Mind was 570 pages. He wrote a novel Whistling in the Dark which was listed in catalogues by Mainstream in 1992 as "coming soon" but remained unpublished, with Bell reworking it several times.

== Awards ==
Dreams of Exile was awarded Best First Book by the Saltire Society in 1994.

Bell won the Orwell Prize for political journalism in 1997.

He was named columnist of the year at the Scottish Press Awards in 2000, 2007, 2008 and 2012.

== Personal life ==
Bell's second marriage was to Mandy Henriksen, an artist, and they had one son, Sean who became a journalist. He was a supporter of Hibernian F.C.

He lived in Coldingham, in the Scottish Borders, for several years. He was there when he suddenly became unwell and died on 10 December 2015, at the age of 59. A memorial service was held on 22 December at Mortonhall Crematorium in Edinburgh.

In April 2017 plans for an award for young writers being set up in his name was announced. The award itself was launched in September 2017.
