= Brendan Bell (footballer) =

Scottish footballer (1910–??)

Personal information
- Full name: Brendan Bell
- Date of birth: 11 May 1910
- Place of birth: Buckhaven, Scotland
- Position: Goalkeeper

Youth career
- Kirkintilloch Rob Roy

Senior career*
| Years | Team | Apps | (Gls) |
| 1942–1943 | Rangers | | |
| 1943–1945 | Dumbarton | 14 | (0) |
- * Club domestic league appearances and goals

Brendan Bell (born 11 May 1910) was a Scottish footballer who played for Dumbarton and Rangers.
