= Laura Bell (author) =

American author

Laura Bell (born) is an American author.

== Biography ==
Bell is the author of the acclaimed Claiming Ground: A Memoir published by the Knopf Doubleday Publishing Group at Random House. The memoir tells about her adventures in rural Wyoming. As noted in Publishers Weekly “Bell's extraordinary ability to impart a true sense of place on each page reveals a stark and stunning landscape populated with a playbill of peculiar personalities attracted to a life of solitude and hard physical work, and her life within this remarkable world.”

Bell's work has been published in several collections. From the Wyoming Arts Council she has received two literature fellowships as well as the Neltje Blanchan Memorial Award and the Frank Nelson Doubleday Memorial Award.

== Personal life ==
Bell lives in Cody, Wyoming, and since 2000 has worked there for the Nature Conservancy.
