= Ronald Bell (cricketer) =

English cricketer

Ron Bell

Ronald Victor Bell (Chelsea 7 January 1931 – Farnham 26 October 1989 (aged 58)) was an English first-class cricketer.

Ronnie Bell represented Middlesex and Sussex as a left-handed batsman and a slow left-arm orthodox bowler in 189 first-class matches between 1952 and 1964. He took 392 wickets at an average of 28.34, with a personal best of 8/54. He took five wickets in an innings on nineteen occasions and ten wickets in a match once. He died from cancer aged 58.
