= Roy Bell (ornithologist) =

New Zealand ornithologist, naturalist, collector and photographer (1882–1966)

Raoul Sunday (Roy) Bell (19 February 1882 – 28 March 1966) was a professional New Zealand and Australian natural history specimen collector, ornithologist, naturalist and photographer, who spent much time on Lord Howe and Norfolk Islands in the Tasman Sea between Australia and New Zealand.

Bell was born on Raoul Island in the Kermadec Group north-east of New Zealand. By 1908 he was working as a specimen collector. From 1912 to 1914 Bell worked for Gregory Mathews, collecting bird specimens for him on Norfolk and Lord Howe Islands. The information and specimens collected enabled Mathews to publish his book “The Birds of Norfolk and Lord Howe Islands” in 1928.

Bell served in the First World War as a photographer. After the war he collected in Victoria and New South Wales, Australia.

== Lord Howe Island ==
Bell settled in Norfolk Island in 1910, but he also spent two years on Lord Howe Island collecting birds and other specimens during and following his employment with Mathews. He had a permit from the Lord Howe Island Board to collect certain birds. Because of opposition from some islanders his permit was temporarily revoked, then restored after he had gained favour with some influential islander families by providing them with special albums of photographs he had taken. Despite the restrictions on the permit Bell collected large numbers of all species, including 80 specimens of the Lord Howe woodhen.

Bell's work on the island added significantly to our knowledge of the birds there. He discovered Kermadec petrels breeding on Mount Gower. He also found that the white-bellied storm petrel bred on the island and added eight other species to Lord Howe's bird list.

Bell retired to Norfolk Island, where he died in 1966. His manuscript journals from when he was working and living on Lord Howe and Norfolk Islands are held by the National Library of Australia.

== Seleected manuscripts ==
- Diary of Raoul Sunday Bell on Raoul (Sunday) Island, 1908–1911
- Norfolk Island Diary, July 1912 – July 1913
- Lord Howe Island Diary, July 1913 – August 1914
