= Laura Bell (courtesan) =

Irish courtesan (1829–1894)

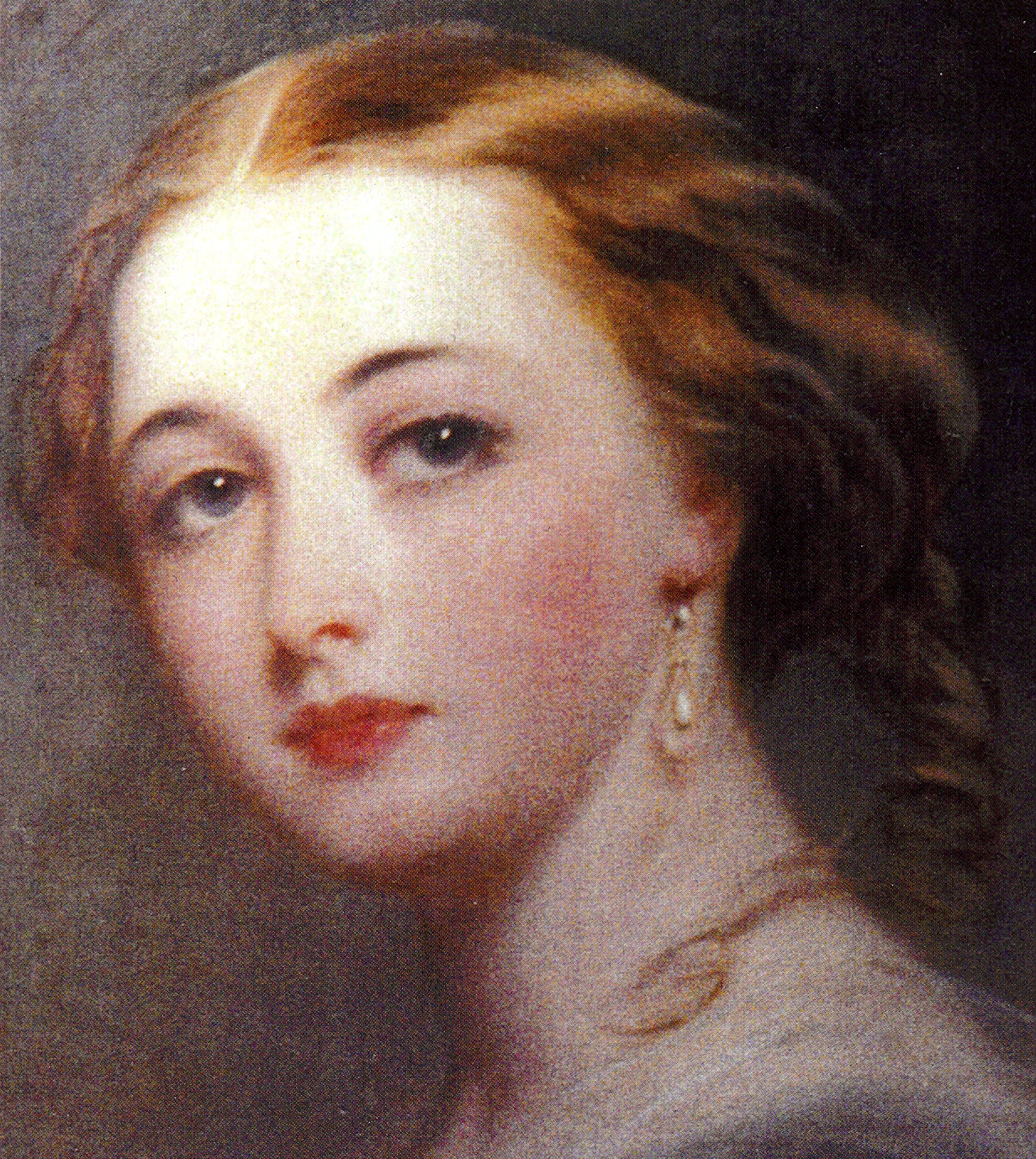
- portrait of Laura Thistlethwayte by Richard Buckner
- Born: Laura Eliza Jane Seymour Bell; 1829; Glenavy, County Antrim, Ireland
- Died: 1894
- Occupations: Courtesan, Evangelist
- Spouse: Captain August Frederick Thistlethwayte

Laura Eliza Jane Seymour Bell (1829–1894, married name Thistlethwayte) was an Irish-born courtesan of Victorian England. She was most notorious for the Nepalese Prime Minister Jung Bahadur Rana reputedly spending £250,000 on her. She later experienced a religious conversion and became a revivalist preacher on morality.

== Early life ==
Bell was born in Glenavy, County Antrim. After an unsupervised childhood, she left home to work as a shop assistant in Belfast. She earned extra money through prostitution.

She later moved to Dublin where she became a successful courtesan. Bell is rumored to have had an affair with Dr William Wilde, father of Oscar Wilde.

== London ==
Around 1849, Bell moved to London, where she became known as The Queen of London Whoredom. Rich noblemen and dukes were entertained by Bell.

She often drove through Hyde Park in a gilt carriage drawn by two white horses. It was here she met the Nepalese Prime Minister Jung Bahadur Rana. Rana installed Bell in a luxury house on Wilton Crescent in Belgravia, and showered her with gifts. There are stories that Rana paid £250,000 for one night with Bell, but it's far more likely that the sum was the total value of gifts given to Bell over the 90 days they spent together. This sum was underwritten by Lord Canning, Governor-General of India.

When Rana had to return to Nepal, he gave Bell a diamond ring and a promise to fulfill her every wish as a parting gift. During the Indian Rebellion, Bell wrote to Rana asking him to send troops to assist the British during the Sepoy Mutiny. She enclosed the ring to remind him of his promise. Rana sent the troops.

On 21 January 1852, she married Captain August Frederick Thistlethwayte, who lived in Grosvenor Square, London, and had an estate in Ross-shire, Scotland.

== Evangelism ==
Bell found religion and became an evangelist, referring to herself as "God's Ambassadress". She hosted evangelical tea parties for high society and aided London's prostitutes.

In 1887, Thistlethwayte accidentally shot and killed himself (he habitually shot his revolver into the ceiling to summon his valet). Bell never remarried.

Prime Minister William Gladstone and his wife became friends with Bell, and this friendship continued until Bell's death in 1894.

== Sources ==
- Courtesans by Katie Hickman, 2003, HarperCollins, ISBN 0-9657930-8-7
