= Laura Anning Bell =

British artist

Laura Anning Bell (1867–1950) was a British artist.

Anning Bell was born Laura Richard in 1867, and studied at the Slade School of Art.

She married the artist and designer Robert Anning Bell (1863–1933), having previously been married to Emile Troncy. Her only son Charles Antoine Richard Troncy was killed during the first world war in 1915 in Champagne.

Her work is in the permanent collection of the Tate Gallery.
