= Sam Bell (footballer, born 1909) =

English footballer

Personal information
- Full name: Samuel Bell
- Date of birth: 6 February 1909
- Place of birth: Burnhope, England
- Date of death: 1982 (aged 72–73)
- Height: 5 ft 7 3/4 in (1.72 m)
- Position: Forward

Senior career*
Years	Team	Apps	(Gls)
	Burnhope Institution	?	(?)
1930–1933	Norwich City	76	(26)
1933–1934	Luton Town	30	(20)
1934–1936	Tottenham Hotspur	15	(6)
1937–1939	Southend United	71	(17)
1945	Millwall	?	(?)
	Tonbridge	?	(?)
- * Club domestic league appearances and goals

Samuel Bell (6 February 1909 – 1982) was a professional footballer who played for Burnhope Institution, Norwich City, Luton Town, Tottenham Hotspur, Southend United, Millwall and Tonbridge.

== Football career ==
Bell played for local club Burnhope Institution before signing for Norwich City. The forward played 76 matches and scored on 26 occasions for the Canaries between 1930 and 1933. In 1933 he joined Luton Town where he made a further 30 appearances and scoring 20 goals. Bell moved to White Hart Lane club Tottenham Hotspur where he participated in 16 games and scoring six goals in all competitions between 1934 and 1936. He signed for Southend United in 1937 and featured in 71 matches and found the net on 17 occasions. After the hostilities of World War II had ended he went on to play for Millwall and finally Tonbridge.
