= Brian Bell (businessman) =

Papa New Guinean businessman (1928–2010)

Sir Brian Bell CSM, KBE, CStJ
- Born: 3 July 1928; Chinchilla, Queensland, Australia
- Died: 25 July 2010 (aged 82); Brisbane, Queensland, Australia
- Citizenship: Papua New Guinean
- Education: Brisbane Central Technical College
- Occupation: Company director
- Years active: 1948–2010
- Organization: Brian Bell Group
- Known for: Businessman, philanthropist
- Spouse: Jean Clough nee Ferguson
- Website: brianbell.com.pg

Sir Brian Ernest Bell CSM, KBE, CStJ (3 July 1928 – 25 July 2010) was an Australian-born businessman who established a business empire in Papua New Guinea.

== Philanthropy and honours ==
Bell supported the Port Moresby General Hospital (where he was chairman of the board), the Red Cross and the Port Moresby City Mission. He also served as deputy lord mayor of Port Moresby, a member of the PNG lands board, the Salvation Army advisory board and the PNG law and order committee. He was at one time chairman of UPNG Foundation, the NCD South Pacific Festival of Arts and the Salvation Army Red Shield Appeal. Bell also served as patron of AIESEC PNG University. He set up a school outside Port Moresby, helped in offering scholarships and funded many needy and deserving young Papua New Guineans.

Bell was Honorary Consul General in Papua New Guinea for Norway and Sweden and was appointed a Knight of the Royal Norwegian Order of Merit and a Commander of the Order of the Polar Star (Sweden) for his service in those positions. He also received the PNG Community Service Medal, Queen's Jubilee Medal, PNG Independence Medal and the Salvation Army's Order of Distinguished Auxiliary Service.

Bell was appointed a Knight Commander of the Order of the British Empire (KBE) for his contributions to business and charity in Papua New Guinea's 1993 New Year's Day Honours List. He was appointed a Commander (Brother) of the Order of St John in 2004.
