= Alexandra Bell (artist) =

American artist

Alexandra Bell (born 1983) is an American multidisciplinary artist. She is best known for her series Counternarratives, large scale paste-ups of New York Times articles edited to challenge the presumption of "objectivity" in news media. Using marginalia, annotation, redaction, and revisions to layout and images, Bell exposes racial and gender biases embedded in print news media.

== Life and education ==
Bell was born and raised in Chicago. She cites visual artists such as Glenn Ligon, Jenny Holzer, and Chilean artist Alfredo Jaar as inspirations. Bell holds a Bachelor of Arts in interdisciplinary studies from the University of Chicago. She also received her master's degree from the Columbia University Graduate School of Journalism in 2013.

== Work and critical reception ==
Bell's work has appeared in major group and solo exhibitions across the United States, including the 2019 Whitney Biennial, which featured a newly commissioned series of prints titled No Humans Involved: After Sylvia Wynter, which looks at the New York Daily News’ reporting of the Central Park Five case. Among other accolades, Bell received the 2018 International Center of Photography Infinity Award in the applied category and was a 2018 Open Society Soros Equality Fellow.

== Exhibitions and installations ==
=== Solo ===
- Atlanta Contemporary, Atlanta, Georgia, August 26 – December 17, 2017
- Bennington College, Bennington, Vermont, October 10 – December 15, 2017
- MoMA PS1, Long Island City, New York, November 9 – December 11, 2017
- Pomona College Museum of Art, Claremont, California, March 2 – May 13, 2018
- Spencer Museum of Art University of Kansas, Lawrence, Kansas, March 5 – April 8, 2018
- Allen Memorial Art Museum and Oberlin College Libraries, Oberlin, Ohio, October 30 – December 21, 2018

=== Group ===
- An unassailable and monumental dignity, CONTACT Gallery, Toronto, Ontario, Canada, September 21 – November 18, 2017
- Lack of Location Is My Location, Koenig & Clinton Gallery, Brooklyn, New York, November 3, 2017 – January 14, 2018, 2017
- Hold These Truths, The Nathan Cummings Foundation New York City, November 13, 2017 – March 14, 2018
- Original Language, Cue Foundation, New York City, September 6 – October 11, 2018
- Punch (curated by Nina Chanel Abney), Jeffrey Deitch, New York, September 15 – October 27, 2018
- The Legacy of Lynching: Confronting Racial Terror In America (organized with the Brooklyn Museum, Equal Justice Initiative, and Google), Cantor Fitzgerald Gallery at Haverford College, Haverford, Pennsylvania, October 26, 2018 – December 16, 2018
- 2019 Whitney Biennial (curated by Rujeko Hockley and Jane Panetta), Whitney Museum of American Art, New York, May 17 – September 22, 2019
- Direct Message: Art, Language, and Power, MCA Chicago, Chicago, Illinois, October 26, 2019 – January 26, 2020
