= Viola Bell =

Elizabeth Viola Bell BEM (4 June 1897 – 25 December 1990) was a New Zealand teacher, sports administrator and community leader. She was born in San Francisco, California, United States, on 4 June 1897.

In the 1976 New Year Honours, Bell was awarded the British Empire Medal, for services to education, sport and cultural activities.
