= Peter Bell (footballer, born 1954) =

Australian rules footballer, born 1954

Peter R. Bell

Personal information
- Born: 14 October 1954 (age 72)
- Original team: East Sandringham
- Debut: Round 10, 1973, St Kilda vs. North Melbourne, at Arden Street
- Height: 188 cm (6 ft 2 in)
- Weight: 83 kg (183 lb)

Playing career^{1}
Years	Club	Games (Goals)
1973–1977	St Kilda	33 (33)
- ^{1} Playing statistics correct to the end of 1977.

Peter R. Bell (born 14 October 1954) is a former Australian rules footballer in the VFL.

A half-forward flanker from East Sandringham, Victoria, he debuted in 1973 with the St Kilda Football Club, and his 188 cm frame was reliable in marking contests. Bell played 33 games and booted 33 goals for St Kilda, before moving to the VFA in 1978 to play for Sandringham Football Club.
