= Samuel Bell (California politician) =

American politician

Samuel Bell (1798 – September 15, 1883) was an American political figure from Mariposa County, California. He served as a Democrat in the California State Assembly in 1853 and was Controller of California from 1854 to 1856, during which he joined the Know Nothing Party.

Political offices
Preceded by Samuel A. Merritt, Thomas E. Ridley	California State Assemblyman, 10th District; 1853–1854 (with Philemon T. Herbert)	Succeeded by George N. Cornwall, Humphrey Griffith, Bernard C. Whitman
