= John Bell =

John Bell may refer to:

== Arts and entertainment ==
- John Zephaniah Bell (1794–1883), Scottish artist
- John Bell (sculptor) (1812–1895), English sculptor
- John Hyslop Bell (1833–1920), Scottish journalist, newspaper owner and editor
- J. Bowyer Bell (1931–2003), American historian, artist and art critic
- John Bell (radio personality) (born 1934), American disc jockey
- John Bell Jr. (artist) (1937–2013), American painter and sculptor
- John Bell (Australian actor) (born 1940), Australian actor and director
- John Kim Bell (born 1952), Canadian conductor
- John Bell (special effects artist), Academy Award nominated special effects artist
- John Bell (rock musician) (born 1962), American guitarist and lead singer for Widespread Panic
- John P. Bell (born 1979), American digital artist, educator and software developer
- John Bell (Scottish actor) (born 1997), Scottish actor

== Literature ==
- John Bell (traveller) (1691–1780), Scottish traveller and author
- John Bell (publisher) (1745–1831), English publisher
- John Bell (folk music) (1783–1864), English folk song collector
- John Gray Bell (1823–1866), English bookseller
- John Joy Bell (1871–1934), Scottish author
- John Bell (historian) (born 1952), Canadian archivist and comic book historian

== Law ==
- John Bell (barrister) (1764–1836), English barrister
- John Montgomerie Bell (1804–1862), advocate of the Scottish bar, and sheriff of Kincardine
- John C. Bell (lawyer) (1861–1935), Pennsylvania lawyer
- John Bell (legal scholar), British professor of law and fellow of Pembroke College, Cambridge

== Politics and government ==
=== Australia ===
- John Alexander Bell (1829–1901), member of the Queensland Legislative Council

=== Canada ===
- John William Bell (1838–1901), member of the House of Commons of Canada
- John Hedley Bell (1840–1897), member of the Legislative Assembly of Manitoba
- John Howatt Bell (1846–1929), premier of Prince Edward Island
- John Peter Bell, Canadian diplomat

=== England and United Kingdom ===
- John Bell (Leominster MP) (fl. 1508–1533/44), MP for Leominster
- John Bell (Winchelsea MP) (fl. 1514–1543), MP for Winchelsea
- John Bell (Liberal politician) (1809–1851), MP for Thirsk
- John R. Bell (trade unionist) (1862–1924), British trade union leader and political activist

=== United States ===
- John Bell (New Hampshire politician) (1765–1836), governor of New Hampshire
- John R. Bell (military officer) (c. 1785–1825), governor of East Florida, 1821
- John Bell (Ohio politician) (1796–1869), U.S. Representative, mayor of two cities in Ohio, and probate judge
- John Bell (Tennessee politician) (1796–1869), U.S. House speaker, secretary of war, senator, and presidential candidate
- John Bell (Wisconsin politician), Wisconsin state assemblyman in 1853
- John Calhoun Bell (1851–1933), U.S. Representative from Colorado
- John C. Bell Jr. (1892–1974), American judge and governor of Pennsylvania
- John J. Bell (1910–1963), U.S. Representative from Texas
- John O. Bell (1912–2000), American ambassador to Guatemala
- John Bell (Florida politician) (1916–1982), Florida state representative and state senator
- John Bell (Virginia politician) (born 1963), member of the Virginia State Senate
- John R. Bell IV (born 1979), member of the North Carolina General Assembly

== Religion ==
- John Bell (bishop of Mayo) (died 1541), clergyman in Ireland
- John Bell (bishop of Worcester) (died 1556), English clergyman
- John Bell (dean of Ely) (died 1591), English priest and academic
- John Bell (Wesleyan minister) (1788–1855), Wesleyan minister from England who came to Newfoundland
- John Bell (Australian priest) (1898–1983), Australian Anglican priest
- John L. Bell (born 1949), Scottish religious leader, musician, and composer

== Science ==
- John Bell (surgeon) (1763–1820), Scottish anatomist and surgeon
- John Graham Bell (1812–1899), American taxidermist
- John Stewart Bell (1928–1990), physicist from Northern Ireland
- John Lane Bell (born 1945), mathematician and philosopher
- Sir John Bell (physician) (born 1952), British–Canadian biologist
- John Cameron Bell (born 1953), Canadian cancer researcher
- John B. Bell (mathematician) (born 1954), American mathematician

== Sport ==
- John Bell (rugby union, born 1853) (1853–1916), English rugby union player
- John Bell (rugby union, born 1879) (1879–1962), Scottish rugby union player
- John Bell (footballer, born 1886) (1886–1917), Australian rules footballer killed during World War I
- John Bell (footballer, born 1891), Scottish football striker
- John Bell (English cricketer) (1895–1974), English cricketer
- John Bell (footballer, born 1901) (1901–1973), English association football winger
- John Bell (1930s Scottish footballer), Scottish football forward
- John Bell (footballer, born 1919) (1919–1994), English football full back
- Johnny Bell (Canadian football) (1921–1998), Canadian football player
- John Robert Bell (1922–2008), American college football coach and athletics administrator
- John A. Bell (born 1929), American football coach
- John Bell (field hockey) (born 1933), British Olympic hockey player
- John Bell (bowls) (born 1947), British bowler
- John Bell (footballer, born 1949), Australian rules footballer
- John Bell (Australian cricketer) (born 1949), Australian cricketer
- JW Bell (John-Wessel Bell, born 1990), South African-born rugby union player in Spain

== Others ==
- John Bell (artillerist) (1747–1798), English artillerist
- John Bell (farmer) (1750–1820), central figure in the Bell Witch ghost story of southern American folklore
- Sir John Bell (British Army officer) (1782–1876), British general and Lieutenant Governor of Guernsey
- John Bell (explorer) (c. 1799–1868), Canadian explorer and Hudson's Bay Company governor
- Sir John Charles Bell (1843–1924), British businessman and lord mayor of London
- John Brown Bell (businessman) (1858–1917) African American businessman, real estate investor, civic leader in Houston
- John Thomas Bell (1878–1965), British businessman, founder of Bellway

== See also ==
- Jack Bell (disambiguation)
- John Bell & Croyden, a pharmacy on Wigmore Street, London
- John Bell Farm, listed on the National Register of Historic Places listings in eastern Chester County, Pennsylvania
- John and Margaret Bell House, listed on the National Register of Historic Places listings in eastern Walworth County, Wisconsin
- John Brown Bell, an American Civil War-era bell that is often known as the "second-most important bell in American history"
- Johnbell, an extinct genus of ungulates
- Jon Bell (born 1997), American soccer player
- Jon Bell (filmmaker), Australian filmmaker, writer for Redfern Now
- Jonathan Bell (disambiguation)
- John C. Bell (disambiguation)
- Johnny Bell (born 1965), American politician in Kentucky
- John Bell Hood (1831–1879), Confederate general
- John Bell Williams (1918–1983), Governor of Mississippi
