= Jack Bell =

Jack Bell may refer to:

- Jack Bell (footballer, born 1868) (1868–1956), Scottish footballer (Dumbarton FC, Everton FC, Celtic FC, national team)
- Jack Bell (footballer, born 1891), English footballer (Plymouth Argyle, Nottingham Forest)
- Jack Bell (footballer, born 1904) (1904–1950), English footballer (Sunderland AFC, Accrington Stanley)

== See also ==
- John Bell (disambiguation), multiple people
