= Sage sparrow =

Sage sparrow was the name of a species of sparrow that has since been reclassified as two species:

- Sagebrush sparrow, Artemisiospiza nevadensis
- Bell's sparrow, Artemisiospiza belli
