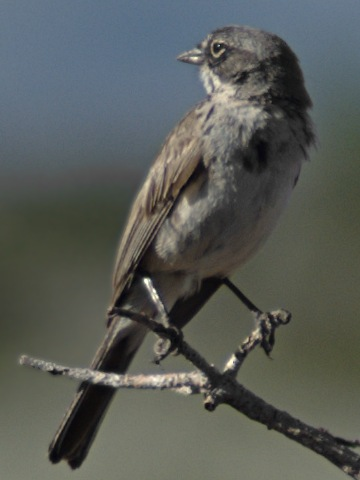
- Adult sagebrush sparrow (A. nevadensis)

Scientific classification
- Kingdom: Animalia
- Phylum: Chordata
- Class: Aves
- Order: Passeriformes
- Family: Passerellidae
- Genus: Artemisiospiza; Klicka & Banks, 2011

Type species
- Emberiza belli Cassin, 1850

Species
- Artemisiospiza nevadensis Artemisiospiza belli

= Artemisiospiza =

Genus of birds

Artemisiospiza is a genus of birds in the American sparrow family, formally described by Klicka and Banks, 2011.

== Species ==
It contains the following two species:

Genus Artemisiospiza – Klicka & Banks, 2011 – two species
| Common name | Scientific name and subspecies | Range | Size and ecology | IUCN status and estimated population |
|---|---|---|---|---|
| Sagebrush sparrow | Artemisiospiza nevadensis (Ridgway, 1874) | western United States and northwestern Mexico. | Size: Habitat: Diet: | LC |
| Bell's sparrow | Artemisiospiza belli (Cassin, 1850) | western United States and northwestern Mexico | Size: Habitat: Diet: | LC |

The two species historically comprised the sage sparrow complex, but were split in 2013 by the American Ornithological Society.

Both Artemisiospiza species inhabit dry areas of the western United States and northern Mexico.
