= John C. Bell =

John C. Bell may refer to:

- John Cameron Bell (born 1953), Canadian cancer researcher
- John C. Bell (lawyer) (1861–1935), Pennsylvania lawyer and football rulesmaker
- John C. Bell Jr. (1892–1974), Pennsylvania politician and judge
- John Calhoun Bell (1851–1933), U.S. Representative from Colorado

== See also ==
- John Bell (disambiguation)
