= Alexander Montgomerie Bell =

Alexander Montgomerie Bell WS (1808–1866) was a Scottish lawyer and writer on law.

== Biography ==
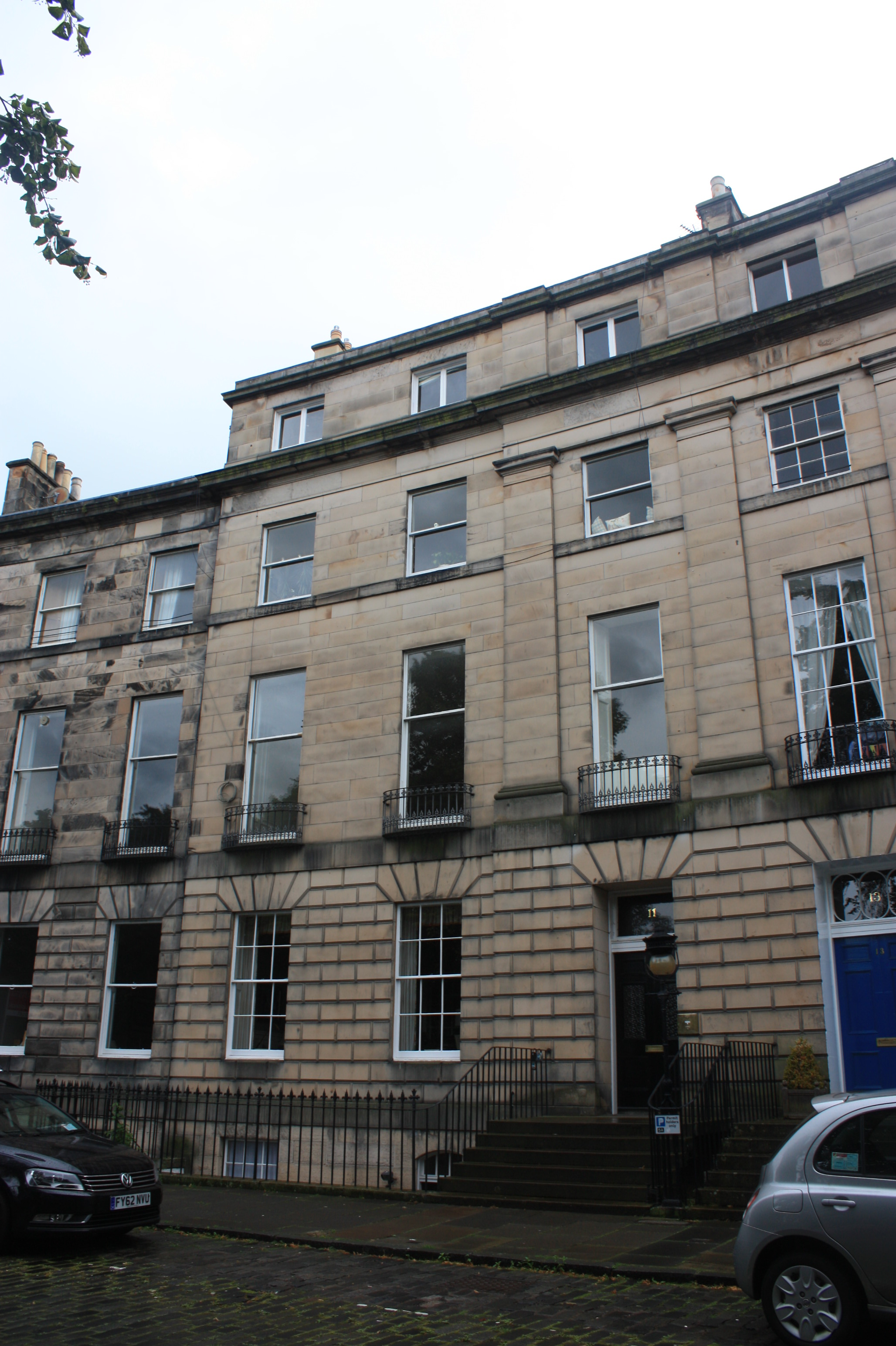
11 Royal Circus, Edinburgh

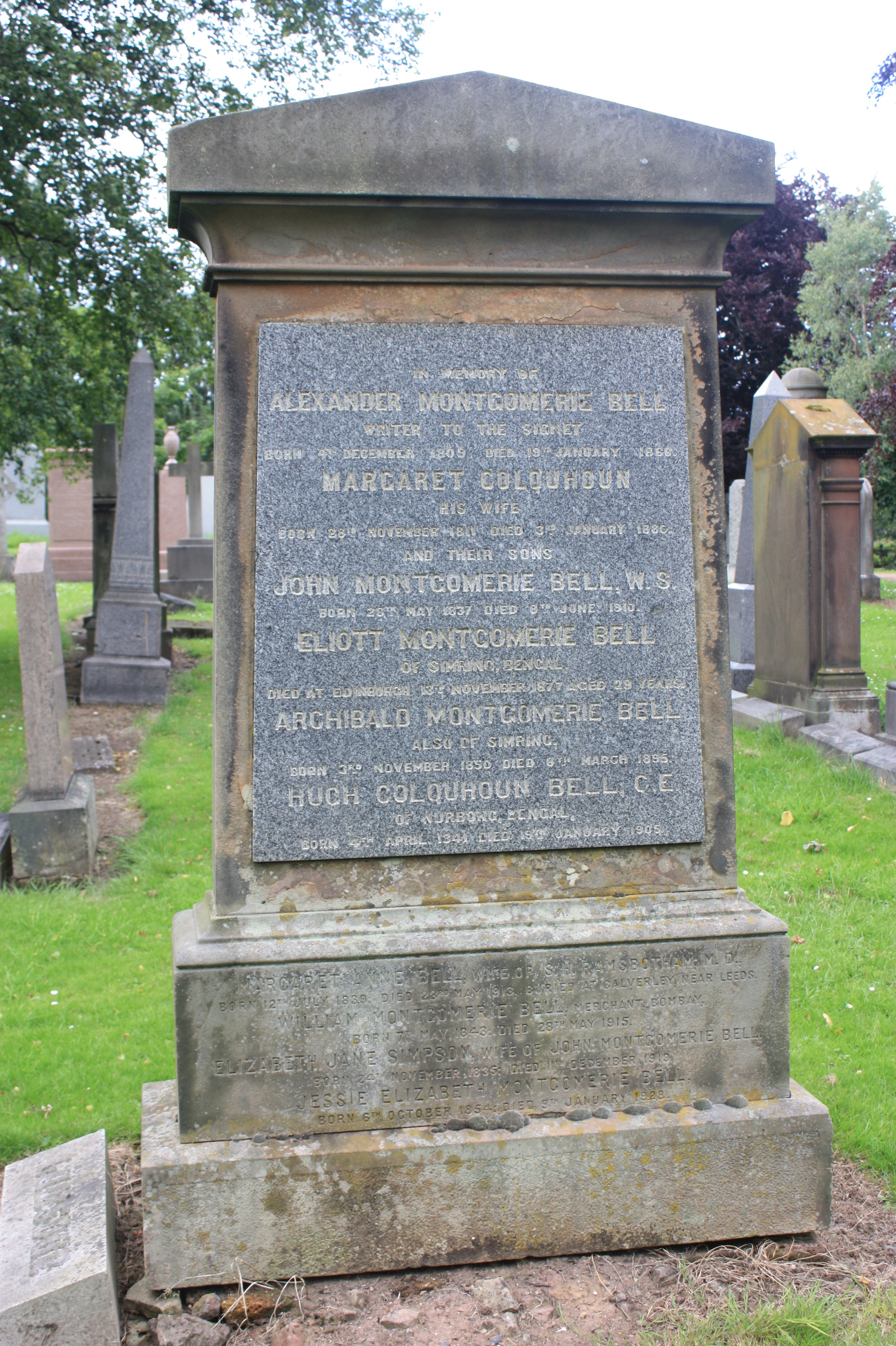
The grave of Alexander Montgomerie Bell, Grange Cemetery, Edinburgh

He was the son of John Bell, a manufacturer of Paisley, and was born there 4 December 1809. His older brother was John Montgomerie Bell.

He studied at Paisley Grammar School and at the University of Glasgow. In 1835 he was admitted a member of the Society of Writers to the Signet, and in 1856 was appointed professor of conveyancing in the University of Edinburgh. In this chair he distinguished himself by the thoroughness and clearness of his expositions of the law of conveyancing, and by the mastery which he showed over some of the more difficult departments, ignorance of which had been a fruitful source of litigation. In 1860 he is living at 11 Royal Circus in Edinburgh's Second New Town, close to Stockbridge.

During the greater part of his professional life Bell was a partner in the firm of Dundas & Wilson, C.S., and was engaged mostly in dealing with matters of conveyancing, for which the large business of that firm furnished unequalled opportunities. Combining much research and thoughtful study with the practical administration of conveyancing, he came to be regarded as facile princeps in the department. Personally, he was of quiet retiring habits and sincerely religious temperament. In a minute entered on his death in the records of the Society of Writers to the Signet, he was spoken of as one "who by his talents, assiduity, and great practical knowledge was well qualified to discharge the important duties devolved upon him [as a professor], and who was deservedly esteemed by all to whom he was personally known."

He died on 19 January 1866. He is buried with his family in the south-east section of the original part of Grange Cemetery in south Edinburgh. The grave faces south onto the east–west division line.

== Publications ==
At Bell's own suggestion his lectures were published after his death. They still form the standard treatise on the subject, a third edition having been issued. According to the Journal of Jurisprudence (August 1867), the book "is by far the most trustworthy and useful guide in the ordinary business of the lawyer's office which has yet been produced". "In these volumes," said the Glasgow Herald (4 May 1867), "the student will find Scottish conveyancing treated with singular clearness and fulness, or rather exhaustiveness, and those in practice will find information sufficient to guide them, and to guide them in safety, along the thorniest and most perplexing paths of every department of the art."

== Family ==
He was married to Margaret Colquhoun (1811–1880). Their children included Dr Alexander Montgomerie Bell (1841–1884), John Montgomerie Bell (1838–1910), Elliot Henrietta Montgomerie Bell (1848–1877), Archibald Montgomerie Bell (1850–1895) and the civil engineer Hugh Colquhoun Bell (1841–1909)

== Notes ==
This article incorporates text from a publication now in the public domain: "Bell, Alexander Montgomerie". Dictionary of National Biography. London: Smith, Elder & Co. 1885–1900.
