= Jonathan Bell =

Jonathan Bell, Jon Bell, or Jonny Bell may refer to:

- Jon Bell (born 1997), Jamaican footballer
- Jon Bell (filmmaker), Australian screenwriter and director
- Jonathan Bell (field hockey) (born 1987), Irish field hockey player
- Jonathan Bell (politician) (born 1970), Democratic Unionist Party politician in Northern Ireland
- Jonathan Anderson Bell (1806–1865), Scottish architect
- Jonny Bell (rugby union) (born 1974), Ireland rugby union player

== See also ==
- Jonathan Bell Lovelace (1895–1979), founder of The Capital Group Companies
- John Bell (disambiguation)
