= Llanddwyn Lifeboat Station =

Former lifeboat station in Anglesey, Wales

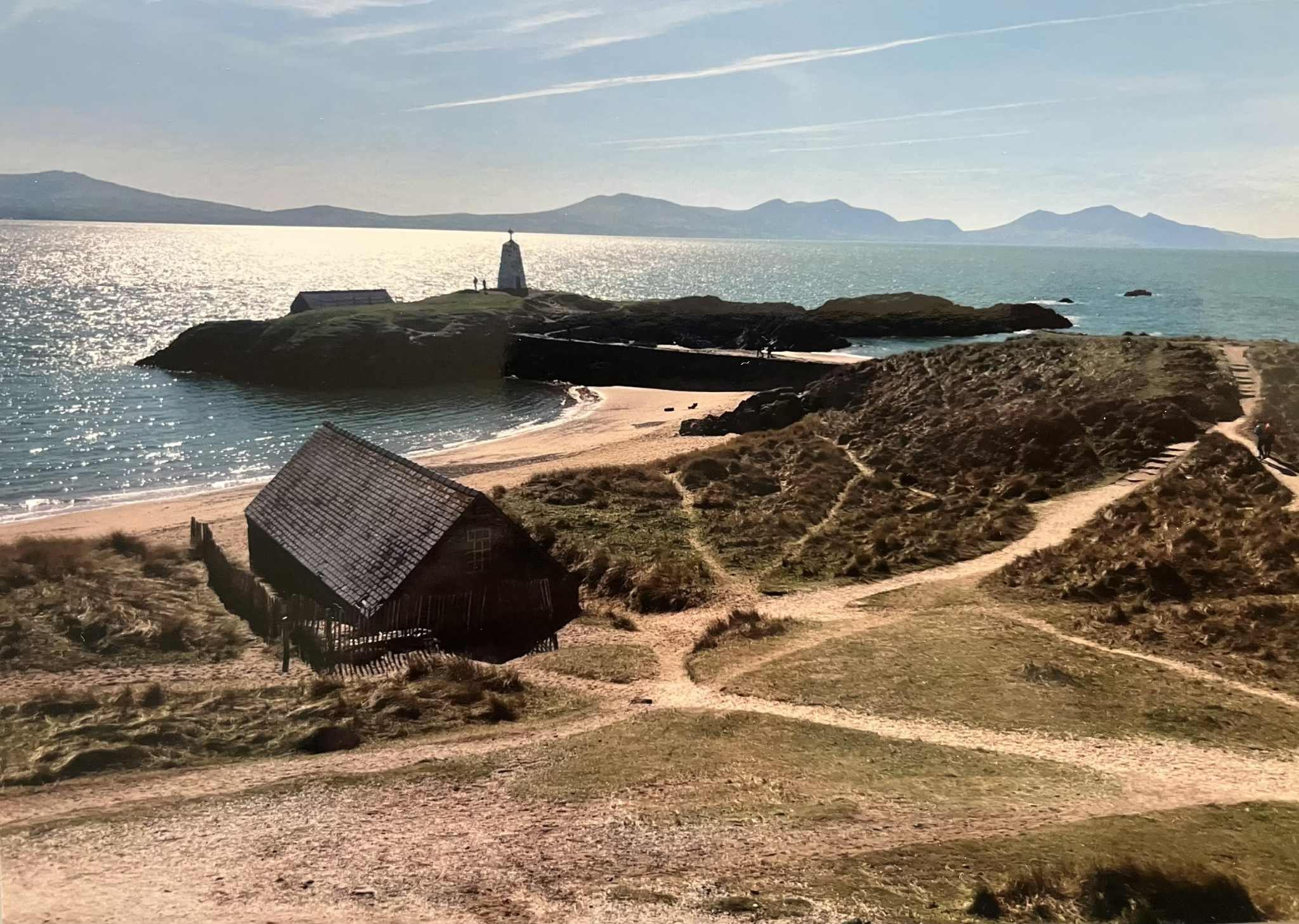
- Former RNLI boathouse, Llanddwyn, Anglesey

- Llanddwyn, Anglesey

General information
- Status: Closed
- Type: RNLI Lifeboat Station
- Location: Ynys Llanddwyn, Newborough, Anglesey, Anglesey, LL61 6SG, Wales
- Coordinates: 53°08′07.6″N 4°24′49.1″W
- Opened: 1826
- Closed: 1907

Llanddwyn Lifeboat Station was located on Ynys Llanddwyn, a small tidal island near the village of Newborough, Anglesey, on the south west coast of Anglesey, Wales.

A lifeboat was first placed at Llanddwyn by the Caernarfon Harbour Trust from 1826 to 1836. A lifeboat station (Station No.5) was formally created here by the Anglesey Association for the Preservation of Life from Shipwreck (AAPLS) in 1840. The station was transferred to the management of the Royal National Lifeboat Institution (RNLI) in 1855.

Llanddwyn Lifeboat Station was closed in 1907.

== History ==
A row of cottages sit on Landdwyn island, once the home of the shipping Pilots, who would guide vessels up the Menai Strait. A lifeboat was placed there by the Caernafon Harbour Trust in 1826, the intention being that the Pilots could man the lifeboat if required. In practice, there were usually too few of them available to launch the boat, although there is some indication that one or two rescues took place. The boat was removed to Caernarfon sometime around 1835 or 1836, where there were more crew available.

In 1828, the Anglesey Association for the Preservation of Life from Shipwreck (AAPLS) was founded by the Rev. James Williams and Mrs Frances Williams, of Llanfair-yng-Nghornwy, Anglesey. On 26 March 1823, they had witnessed the loss of 140 lives from the wreck of the vessel Alert, and spent the following five years raising funds and gaining support for a lifeboat service.

In 1840, a 26-foot lifeboat, built by Taylor of Limehouse, London, and costing £65, was purchased by the AAPLS and stationed at Llanddwyn. A 32-foot long boathouse was constructed, and four extra men from nearby Newborough village were enrolled as crew.

Only one year later, on 18 October 1841, the lifeboat was called to the ship Mountaineer, on passage from Rio de la Hache to Caernarfon, when she was driven ashore on the North Bank. One boy was lost, but the lifeboat rescued the Master, his wife, three children and 12 crew. Coxswain Griffith Griffiths was awarded the RNIPLS Silver Medal.

The Heywood, on passage from Africa to Liverpool, was wrecked on North Bank on 7 February 1846. The Llanddwyn lifeboat rescued all 22 crew.

In rough seas on 16 September 1847, the lifeboat was capsized and washed ashore, whilst on call to the Soane of Boston. Crew member William Owen was drowned. The lifeboat crew righted the boat, set out again, and rescued all the crew of the Soane.

In 1854, the RNIPLS changed its name to become the Royal National Lifeboat Institution, and in 1855, all six lifeboat stations of the AAPLS, Cemlyn (no.1), Holyhead (no.2), Rhoscolyn (no.3), Penmon (no.4), Llanddwyn (no.5) and Moelfre (no.6), were transferred over to the management of the RNLI.

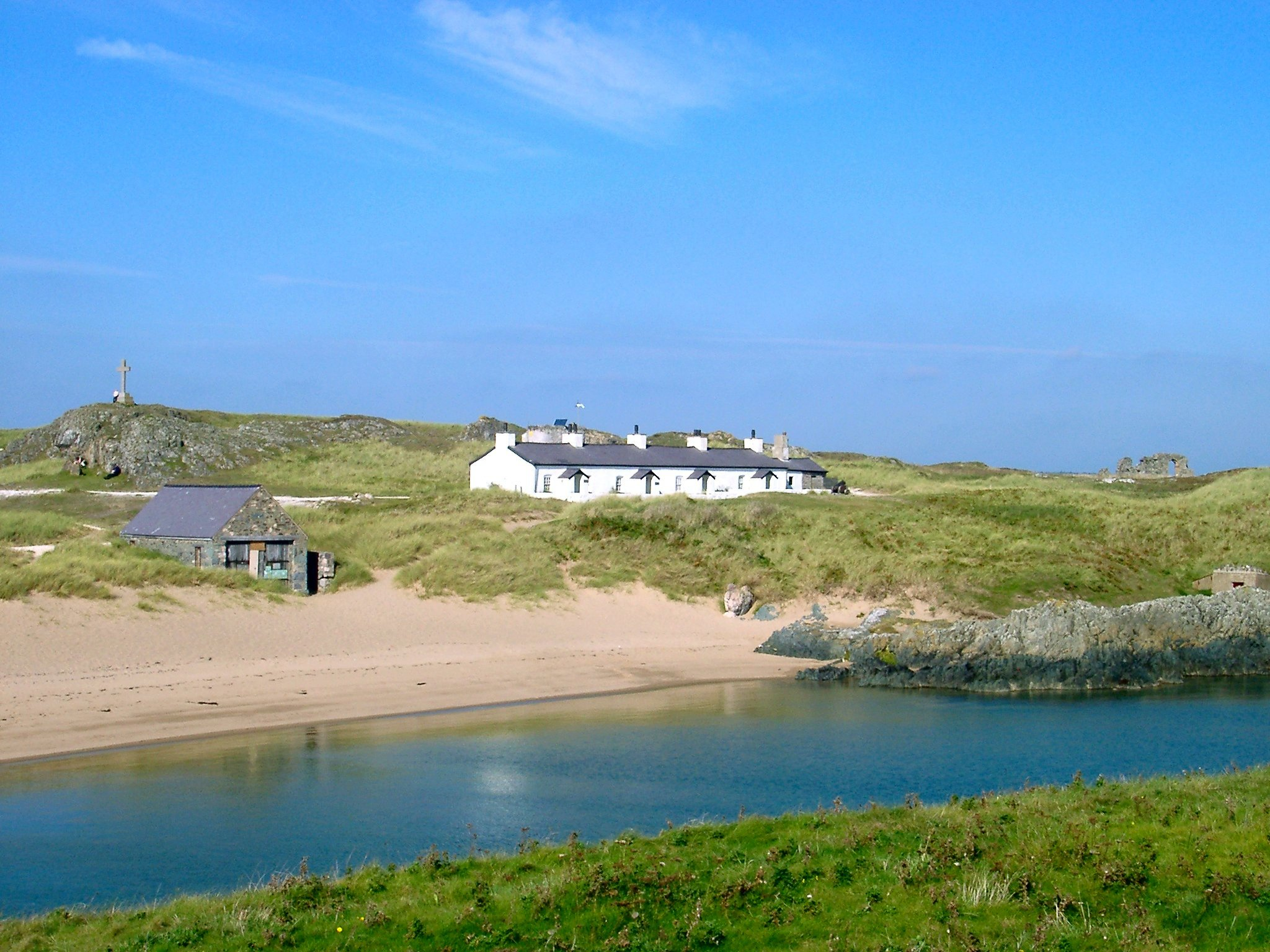
Llanddwyn Pilot cottages and former RNLI boathouse

In 1861, the RNLI ordered the construction of a new boathouse, costing £130, and provided an unnamed 30-foot self-righting 'Pulling and Sailing' (P&S) lifeboat, one with sails and (6) oars, costing £154. The boat was launched just three times in a five-year period, but would rescue 29 lives. In an unusual service on 27 November 1864, the lifeboat went to the aid of the Devonshire of Liverpool. She was unable to progress, with 17 crew members ill. Five lifeboatmen went aboard, and helped take the vessel to Liverpool, arriving there the following day.

Llanddwyn would get another new boat in 1866, after the previous boat started to show signs of decay. A 32-foot self-righting (P&S) lifeboat, which cost £258-10s-0d, was constructed by Woolfe of Shadwell, London, and was transported to Caernarfon free of charge, by the London and North Western Railway. A new transporting carriage was also supplied, costing a further £84-6s. The lifeboat, carriage and equipment was funded, via the Manchester branch of the RNLI, by a donation of £1,450 from an anonymous lady with the initials "H. W.". The remaining monies were appropriated to the lifeboat stations at Blyth and Lyme Regis.

After being placed on public display for a short while in Caernarfon, the boat was draped in flags, and paraded through the town to the harbour, where with the consent of the donor, the lifeboat was named John Gray Bell, in memory of the recently deceased bookseller, who was also an Honorary Secretary of the Manchester branch of the RNLI. After the ceremony, the lifeboat was launched, and rowed to her station across the Menai Strait. The carriage was transported to the island free of charge on the ferry steamer.

On 14 February 1867, the John Gray Bell went to the aid of the barque James Campbell, on passage from Demerara, British Guiana to Liverpool, which had run aground on the North Bank. 11 crew were rescued. On station for 19 years, John Gray Bell would be launched 18 times, and rescued 37 lives.

The last boat to serve at Llanddwyn was the Richard Henry Gould (ON 66). A 34-foot 10-oared self-righting (P&S) lifeboat, built by Forrestt of Limehouse, London, and costing £327. The boat arrived in Llanddwyn on 29 October 1885.

The Richard Henry Gould would serve at Llanddwyn for 22 years. Launched just 10 times on service in that time, and with only two lives saved, the end was in sight for Llanddwyn. Ultimately though, the Llanddwyn station would be closed, but for the same reason as it was in 1836 - it was becoming increasingly difficult to find crew for this remote location. Llanddwyn Lifeboat Station was formally closed in 1907.

Richard Henry Gould (ON 66) was retired from service and broken up in 1907. The 1861 boathouse is still standing.

== Station honours ==
The following are awards made at Llanddwyn.

- RNIPLS Silver Medal

Griffith Griffiths, Coxswain – 1841

== Roll of honour ==
In memory of those lost whilst serving Llanddwyn lifeboat.

- On service to the fully-rigged vessel Soane on 16 September 1847

William Owen, crew member

== Llanddwyn lifeboats ==
ON (Note: ON is the RNLI's Official Number of the boat.)	Name	Built	On station	Class	Comments
–	Unnamed	1825	1826–1836	28-foot North Country	(Note: 28-foot (8-oared) North Country non-self-righting lifeboat, gift of Admiral Crawley, built by Skelton of Scarborough, North Yorkshire.)
Pre-196	Unnamed	1840	1840–1861	27-foot Palmer	(Note: 27-foot x 8-foot (5-oared) Palmer-class non-self-righting lifeboat, provided by the Anglesey LB Association, built by Taylor of Limehouse, London, costing £76.)
Pre-335	Unnamed	1858	1861–1866	30-foot Peake Self-righting (P&S)	(Note: 30-foot x 6-foot 6in (6-oared) Peake-class self-righting (P&S) lifeboat, provided by the Board of Trade for the Calais Harbour Board, built by Forrestt of Limehouse, London. costing £154.); Previously Lucy at Calais.
Pre-469	John Gray Bell	1866	1866–1885	32-foot Prowse Self-righting (P&S)	(Note: 32-foot x 7-foot 7in (10-oared) Prowse-class self-righting (P&S) lifeboat, gift of 'H. W.' of Manchester, built by Woolfe of Shadwell, London, costing £259.)
66	Richard Henry Gould	1885	1885–1907	34-foot Self-righting (P&S)	(Note: 34-foot x 7-foot 6in (10-oared) self-righting (P&S) lifeboat, legacy of Mr J. Gould of Didsbury, built by Forrestt of Limehouse, London, costing £327.)

Pre ON numbers are unofficial numbers used by the Lifeboat Enthusiast Society to reference early lifeboats not included on the official RNLI list.

== See also ==
- List of RNLI stations
- List of former RNLI stations
- Royal National Lifeboat Institution lifeboats
