= John Gray Bell =

British bookseller

John Gray Bell (1823 – 1866) was an English bookseller.

Bell was born in Newcastle-upon-Tyne on 21 September 1823, the son of Thomas Bell (1785–1860), a house agent and surveyor. In 1847, he married Dorothy Taylor of North Shields. He moved to London in 1848, and began business as a bookseller in Covent Garden.

Bell was an earnest student of antiquarian literature, collected topographical books and prints, and issued many interesting trade catalogues. In 1850 he started publishing a valuable series of Tracts on the Topography, History. Dialects, &c., of the Counties of Great Britain, of which about sixteen came out, including original glossaries of Essex, Gloucestershire, Dorset, Cumberland, and Berkshire. In 1851 he published A Descriptive and Critical Catalogue of Works, illustrated by Thomas and John Bell. This was compiled by himself. Another of his works was a genealogy of the Bell and other families, printed for private circulation in 1866, and entitled A Genealogical Account of the Descendants of John of Gaunt, Duke of Lancaster.

Bell moved to Manchester in 1854, where he successfully followed his trade for the rest of his life. He died there on 21 February 1866, aged 43.

John Gray Bell was an Honorary Secretary for the Manchester fundraising branch of the Royal National Lifeboat Institution (RNLI), and was instrumental in helping with the provision of nine lifeboats. Shortly after his death, in 1866, a new 32-foot self-righting 'Pulling and Sailing' (P&S) lifeboat, one with sails and (10) oars, was provided to Llanddwyn Lifeboat Station on Anglesey in Wales, and was named John Gray Bell in his memory. The lifeboat served until 1885.
