= John Peter Bell =

Canadian diplomat

John Peter Bell is a former Canadian ambassador. He was concurrently appointed as Ambassador Extraordinary and Plenipotentiary to Mali and Niger then to Upper Volta and to the Ivory Coast. He later became Ambassador Extraordinary and Plenipotentiary to Brazil then the High Commissioner to Malaysia.

== Early life ==
John worked at a fish cannery at Namu, British Columbia when he was 14–15 years old. The fishing port is close to Bella Bella, home to Heiltsuk Nation. These early formative interactions with the Indigenous communities inspired his later work on Indigenous rights as a career diplomat.

== Philanthropy ==
In 2018, Bell provided for a gift to support the First Nations House of Learning at University of British Columbia (UBC). The aim is to increase Indigenous graduates in the university and enhance Indigenous history to aid a 'full and accurate understanding of Canadian history.' In addition, Bell's endowment supports the annual John P. Bell Lecture in Global Indigenous Rights in the university. The First Nations House of Learning is housed in the First Nations Longhouse to which his father Jack Bell was previously a lead donor.

=== John P. Bell Lecture in Global Indigenous Rights ===
The lecture is hosted by the Institute for Critical Indigenous Studies at the First Nations Longhouse on UBC Campus.

Year	Speaker
2016	J. Wilton Littlechild
2017	Victoria Tauli-Corpuz
2018	Sheila Nicholas
2019	Dalee Sambo Dorough
2020	Mariam Wallet Mohamed Aboubakrine
2021	K’odi Nelson
2024	Kyle Powys Whyte
2025	Dolly Kikon

Diplomatic posts
Preceded by Ernest Hébert	Ambassador Extraordinary and Plenipotentiary to Mali; 1982-	Succeeded by Jean-Guy Joseph Bernard Saint-Martin
Preceded by Ernest Hébert	Ambassador Extraordinary and Plenipotentiary to Niger; 1982-	Succeeded by Jean-Guy Joseph Bernard Saint-Martin
Preceded by Ernest Hébert	Ambassador Extraordinary and Plenipotentiary to Burkina Faso; 1983-	Succeeded by Jean-Guy Joseph Bernard Saint-Martin
Preceded by	Ambassador Extraordinary and Plenipotentiary to Ivory Coast; 1983-	Succeeded by
Preceded by Anthony Tudor Eyton	Ambassador Extraordinary and Plenipotentiary to Brazil; 1987-1990	Succeeded by William L. Clarke
Preceded by George Wesley Seymour	High Commissioner to Malaysia; 1993-	Succeeded by André S. Simard
