= John Bell (1930s Scottish footballer) =

Scottish footballer

John Bell was a Scottish professional footballer who played as a forward. Bell played in the Scottish Leagues for Beith and Queen of the South before joining Preston North End.

Bell was signed to Beith before leaving at the start of the 1932–33 season to join Queen of the South. Scoring 14 goals in his first season at Queens, Bell was part of the promotion winning Queen of the South side who gained their first promotion to the top division in Scotland. The promotion was by finishing the 1932–33 season as runners up to Hibernian.

Bell scored the first ever top division goal for the Dumfries club when he scored the first goal of Queens' first top division game. Lining up beside Willie Savage and Willie Ferguson, the game was against Celtic at Palmerston Park. Bell scored in the third minute when Kennaway in Celtic goal could only parry a shot by Wales. Bell scored a second goal, three minutes into the second half. This was the winner in a 3–2 victory.

Bell joined Preston North End in late December 1933. The undisclosed fee was believed to be around £1,500, surpassing the previous QoS transfer fee paid for Billy Halliday. Moving clubs mid season, he was on nine goals for the season at that point.
