= Jack Bell (footballer, born 1891) =

English footballer

Personal information
- Full name: John James Bell
- Date of birth: 2 March 1891
- Place of birth: South Shields, England
- Position: Inside forward

Senior career*
Years	Team	Apps	(Gls)
1907–1908	Sherwood Foresters		
1908	St Bartholomew's		
1908–1909	Christ Church		
1909–1910	Sutton Town		
1910–1911	Royal Engineers		
1911–1912	Reading		
1912–1913	Plymouth Argyle	19	(8)
1913–1916	Nottingham Forest	54	(6)
1919	South Shields	4	(1)
1919–1920	Merthyr Town		
1921	Grimsby Town	3	(0)
1921	Loughborough Corinthians		
1921–1923	Rotherham County	15	(2)
1923	Weymouth		
1923–1924	Hartlepools United	12	(4)
- * Club domestic league appearances and goals

John James Bell (born 2 March 1891) was an English professional footballer who played as an inside forward in the Football League for Nottingham Forest, Rotherham County, Hartlepools United, South Shields and Grimsby Town.

== Personal life ==
Bell served in the British Armed Forces during the First World War.

== Career statistics ==
Appearances and goals by club, season and competition
Club	Season	League			FA Cup		Total	
Club	Season	Division	Apps	Goals	Apps	Goals	Apps	Goals
Plymouth Argyle	1912–13	Southern League First Division	14	7	2	1	16	8
Plymouth Argyle	1913–14	Southern League First Division	5	1	0	0	5	1
Plymouth Argyle	Total		19	8	2	1	21	9
Nottingham Forest	1913–14	Second Division	30	4	2	1	32	5
Nottingham Forest	1914–15	Second Division	24	2	1	0	25	2
Nottingham Forest	Total		54	6	3	1	57	7
Hartlepools United	1923–24	Third Division North	12	4	―		12	4
Career total			85	18	5	2	90	20
