= John Bell (footballer, born 1901) =

English footballer

Personal information
- Full name: John Barr Bell
- Date of birth: 5 April 1901
- Place of birth: Barrow-in-Furness, England
- Date of death: 31 May 1973 (aged 72)
- Place of death: Hastings, England
- Position: Winger

Senior career*
Years	Team	Apps	(Gls)
- Queen's Park
1920–1923	Chelsea	42	(9)
- Hamilton Academical
- Cowdenbeath
- * Club domestic league appearances and goals

John Barr Bell (5 April 1901 – 31 May 1973) was an English footballer who played as a winger.

== Club career ==
A doctor by profession, Bell played football professionally with Chelsea in the early 1920s, between spells in Scotland with Queen's Park and Hamilton Academical.
