= John Bell (Wisconsin politician) =

American politician

John Bell was an American politician. He was a member of the Wisconsin State Assembly in 1853. His former home in Spring Prairie, Wisconsin, now known as the John and Margaret Bell House, is listed on the National Register of Historic Places.
