= John Bell (footballer, born 1949) =

Australian rules footballer

Personal information
- Full name: John Bell
- Born: 30 August 1949 (age 77)
- Original team: Walpeup
- Height: 183 cm (6 ft 0 in)
- Weight: 71 kg (157 lb)

Playing career^{1}
| Years | Club | Games (Goals) |
| 1969 | Collingwood | 2 (0) |
- ^{1} Playing statistics correct to the end of 1969.

John Bell (born 30 August 1949) is a former Australian rules footballer who played with Collingwood in the Victorian Football League (VFL).
