= Jack Bell (footballer, born 1904) =

English footballer

Personal information
- Full name: John Carr Bell
- Date of birth: 13 January 1904
- Place of birth: Seaham, England
- Date of death: 1950 (aged 45–46)
- Position: Goalkeeper

Youth career
- 1922–1923: Ryhope Colliery
- 1923–1924: Seaham Colliery

Senior career*
Years	Team	Apps	(Gls)
1924–1930	Sunderland	41	(0)
1930–1931	Walsall	2	(0)
1931–1932	Accrington Stanley	28	(0)
1932–1936	Bradford Park Avenue	66	(0)
- * Club domestic league appearances and goals

John Carr Bell (13 January 1904 – 1950) was an English professional footballer who played as a goalkeeper for Sunderland.
