= John and Margaret Bell House =

Historic house in Wisconsin, United States

- U.S. National Register of Historic Places
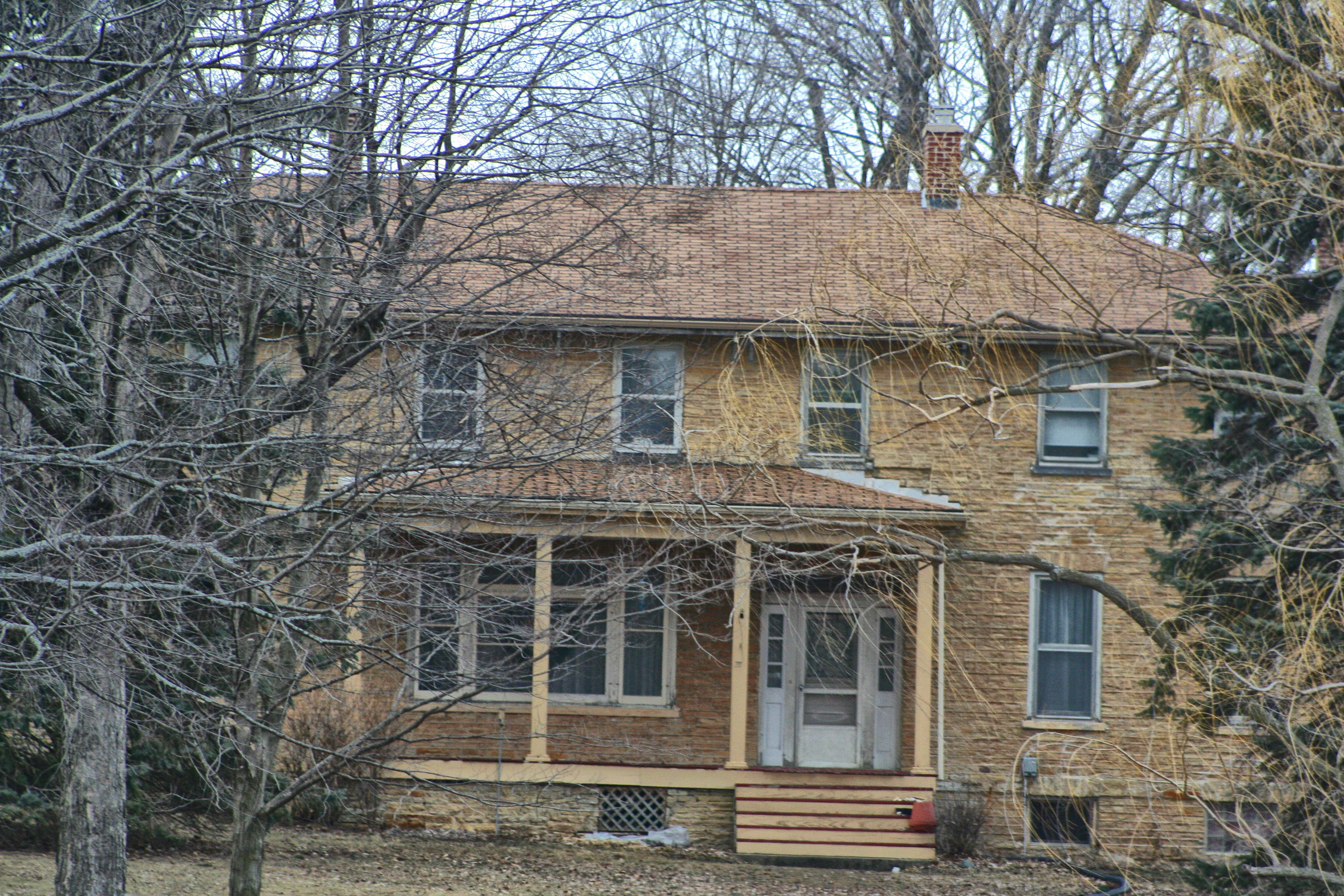
- John and Margaret Bell House

- Location within Wisconsin Location within the United States
- Location: 554 Spring Prairie Rd. Spring Prairie, Wisconsin
- Coordinates: 42°41′57.1″N 88°19′44.5″W
- Built: c. 1850
- Architectural style: Greek Revival/Italianate
- NRHP reference No.: 94001154
- Added to NRHP: September 15, 1994

The John and Margaret Bell House is located in Spring Prairie, Wisconsin. The two-story stone house, built of local sandstone c. 1850 sits on a 3.8 acre parcel. It was originally part of an 80-acre parcel and with other parcels was part of a farm. The house was listed on the National Register of Historic Places in 1994.

== History ==
John Bell, in partnership with E. D. Lay, started a nursery business in Wisconsin in 1832, selling a variety of plants and trees. He acquired the property on which the Bell house sits in 1852, and either moved into an existing house on the property, or, according to local lore, built a new house. Bell was also a local politician and a member of the Wisconsin Assembly in 1853. By 1858, however, he was out of the nursery business, possibly due to a pest called "bark louse". Thereafter, he was a farmer. Bell died in 1884 at 77 years of age. His wife lived until 1902, his heirs then sold the farm to a sister, who held it until 1914 when it passed from the family.

The house is significant as an example of a vernacular stone house built from locally quarried sandstone. The quarry was originally opened by the Strangite Mormons, who had settled in the Burlington area in the 1840s. The house is larger than other stone houses in the area, at 62 feet by 30 feet. It is built of two layers of the unusually thin sandstone blocks sold by the Mormon quarry.
