= John Bell (footballer, born 1919) =

English footballer

Personal information
- Full name: John Henry Bell
- Date of birth: 29 August 1919
- Place of birth: Morpeth, England
- Date of death: 1994 (aged 74–75)
- Position: Full-back

Senior career*
Years	Team	Apps	(Gls)
1945–1950	Gateshead	50	(0)
- * Club domestic league appearances and goals

John Henry Bell (29 August 1919 – 1994) was an English footballer who played as a full-back.

Bell played league football for Gateshead between 1946 and 1950, playing a total of 57 league games in the Football League Third Division North & FA Cup without scoring.

== Career statistics ==
Appearances and goals by club, season and competition
Club	Season	League		FA Cup		Total	
Club	Season	Apps	Goals	Apps	Goals	Apps	Goals
Gateshead	1945–46	—		4	0	4	0
Gateshead	1946–47	35	0	3	0	38	0
Gateshead	1947–48	11	0	0	0	11	0
Gateshead	1948–49	3	0	0	0	3	0
Gateshead	1949–50	1	0	0	0	1	0
Career total		50	0	7	0	57	0

== Sources ==
- "JOHN BELL". Post War English & Scottish Football League A–Z Player's Transfer Database.
- "John Bell". English National Football Archive.
