= John Bell (Wesleyan minister) =

John Bell (1788–1855) (19 October 1788 – 26 October 1855) was an English Wesleyan minister who came to Newfoundland as the senior man in a team of missionaries sent out by the British Wesleyan Conference.

Bell became the chairman of the Newfoundland mission when he and the other missionaries arrived in 1816. He became a strong force in Newfoundland at a time of considerable economic depression. The Wesleyan missionaries under his leadership improved conditions for their congregations and the region as a whole.
