= John Graham Bell =

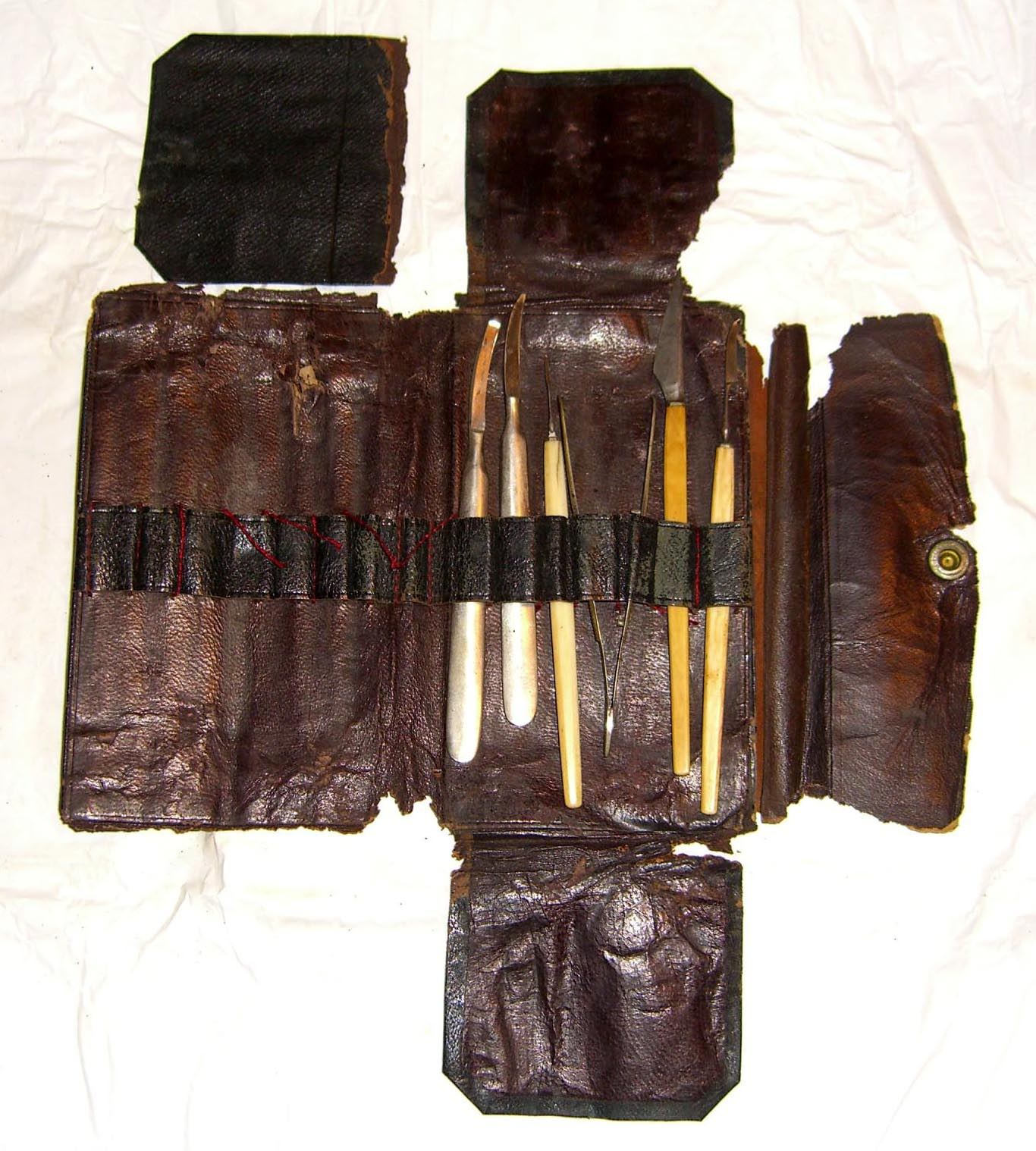
Taxidermy tool kit owned by John Graham Bell. The three tools on the right feature ivory handles.

John Graham Bell (July 12, 1812 – October 22, 1889) was an American taxidermist and collector. He traveled with John James Audubon up the Missouri River in 1843. He also taught taxidermy to Theodore Roosevelt.

Bell's sparrow (Artemisiospiza belli) and Bell's vireo (Vireo bellii) are named after him.

Bell was born and died in Sparkill, NY (July 12, 1812 - October 22, 1889). He is buried in Tappan, New York.
