= John Bell (English cricketer) =

English cricketer (1895–1974)

Personal information
- Full name: John Thomson Bell
- Born: 16 June 1895; Batley, Yorkshire, England
- Died: 8 August 1974 (aged 79); Guiseley, Yorkshire, England
- Batting: Right-handed

Domestic team information
- Years: Team
- 1921–1923: Yorkshire
- 1924–1931: Glamorgan
- 1924–1930: Wales

Umpiring information
- FC umpired: 92

Career statistics
Competition	First-class
Matches	184
Runs scored	8,390
Batting average	29.23
100s/50s	12/41
Top score	225
Balls bowled	245
Wickets	2
Bowling average	102.50
5 wickets in innings	0
10 wickets in match	0
Best bowling	1/2
Catches/stumpings	62/–
- Source: Cricinfo, 28 October 2012

John Thomson Bell (16 June 1895 – 8 August 1974) was an English cricketer. Born in Batley, he was a right-handed batsman. Between 1921 and 1940, he played for Yorkshire and the Glamorgan county cricket club, and the Wales national cricket team. Over the course of 184 matches, he scored 8,390, with a batting average of 29.23. Bell died in Guiseley, on 8 August 1974, aged 79.
