= John Montgomerie Bell =

British lawyer

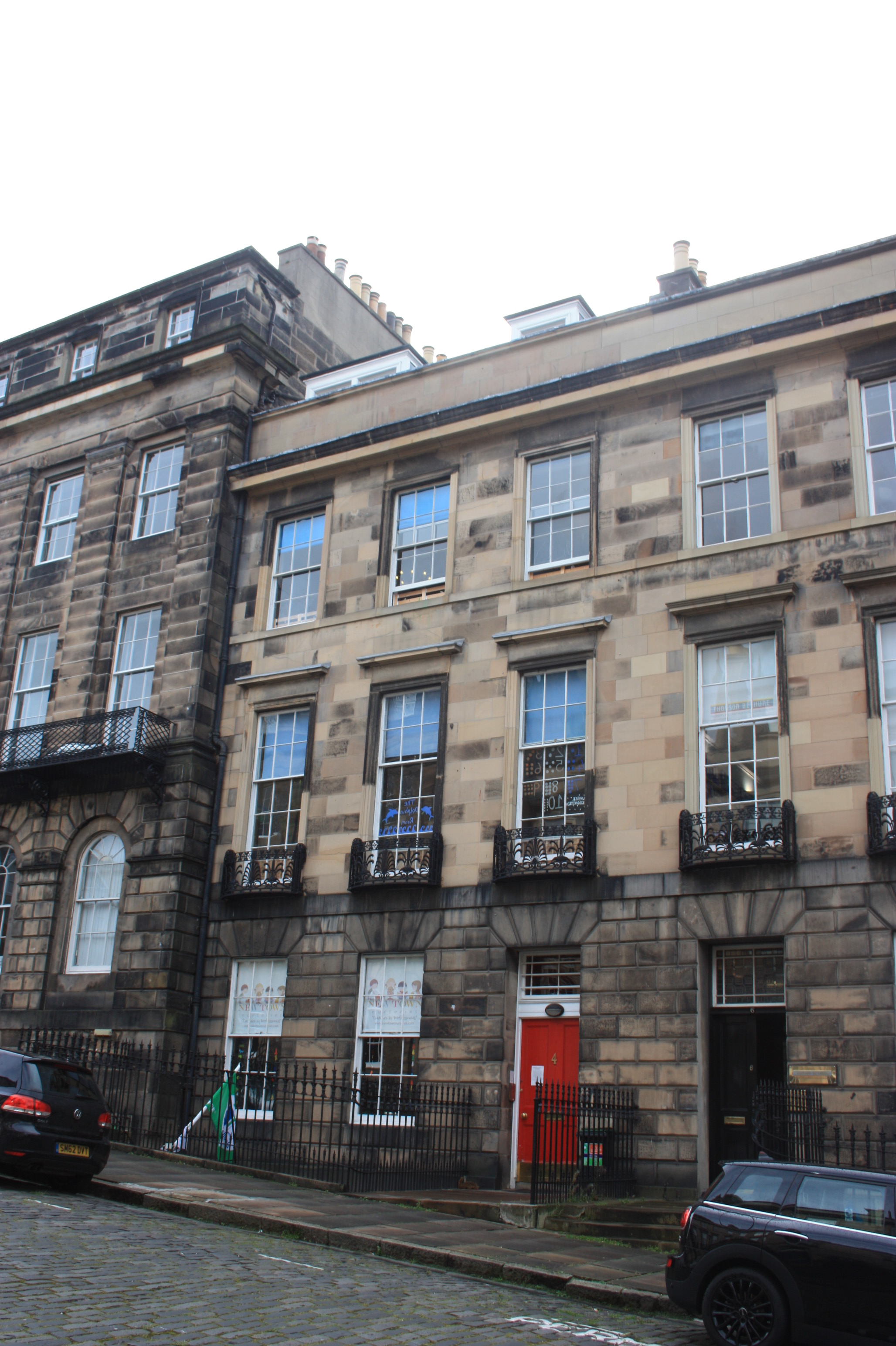
4 Forres Street, Edinburgh

John Montgomerie Bell (11 February 1804 – 16 October 1862) was an advocate of the Scottish bar, and Sheriff of Kincardine.

== Life ==
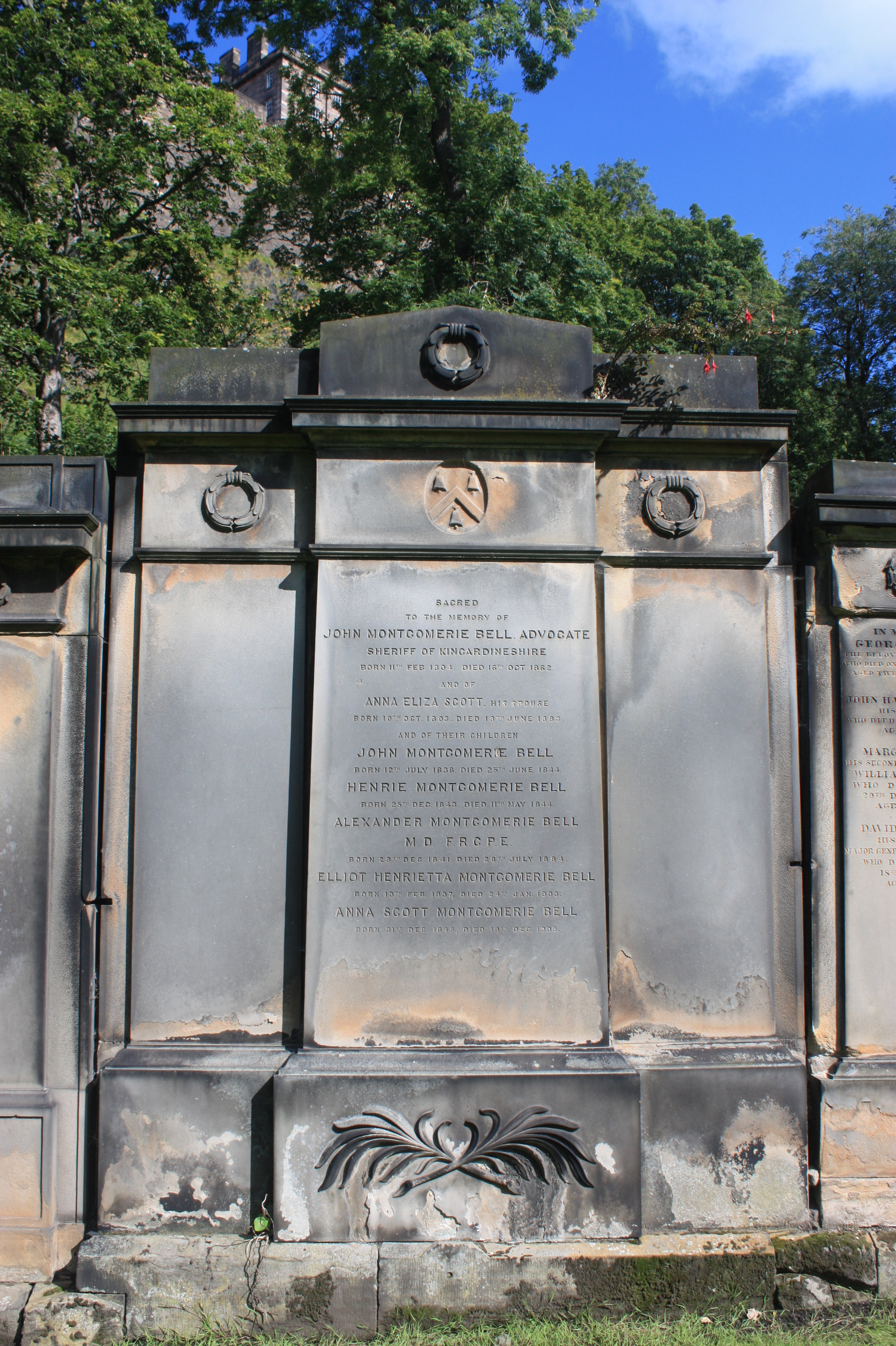
The grave of John Montgomerie Bell, St Cuthberts Churchyard, Edinburgh

He was born at Paisley on 11 February 1804, the son of John Bell and elder brother to Alexander Montgomerie Bell. He was educated at Paisley Grammar School then studied law at the University of Glasgow. He was called to the Edinburgh bar in 1825, and from 1830 to 1846 assisted, with conspicuous ability, in conducting the court of session reports. He lived at 4 Forres Street on Edinburgh's Moray Estate.

In 1847 he was appointed an advocate-depute, and in 1861 sheriff of Kincardine.

He died from the effects of an accident (he fell from his horse) 16 October 1862. He is buried with his family in the southern section of St Cuthberts Churchyard in Edinburgh.

== Publications ==
In 1861 he published a 'Treatise on the Law of Arbitration in Scotland.' a comprehensive and perspicuous exposition of this branch of Scotch law, and the standard work on the subject.

In 1863 a poem, 'The Martyr of Liberty,' which he had written shortly after his call to the bar, was published in accordance with directions left by himself.

== Family ==
He married secondly Anna Eliza Scott (1803-1883). His eldest son was also John Montgomerie Bell but died in childhood. One son was named Alexander Montgomerie Bell (1841-1884) and was a physician.
