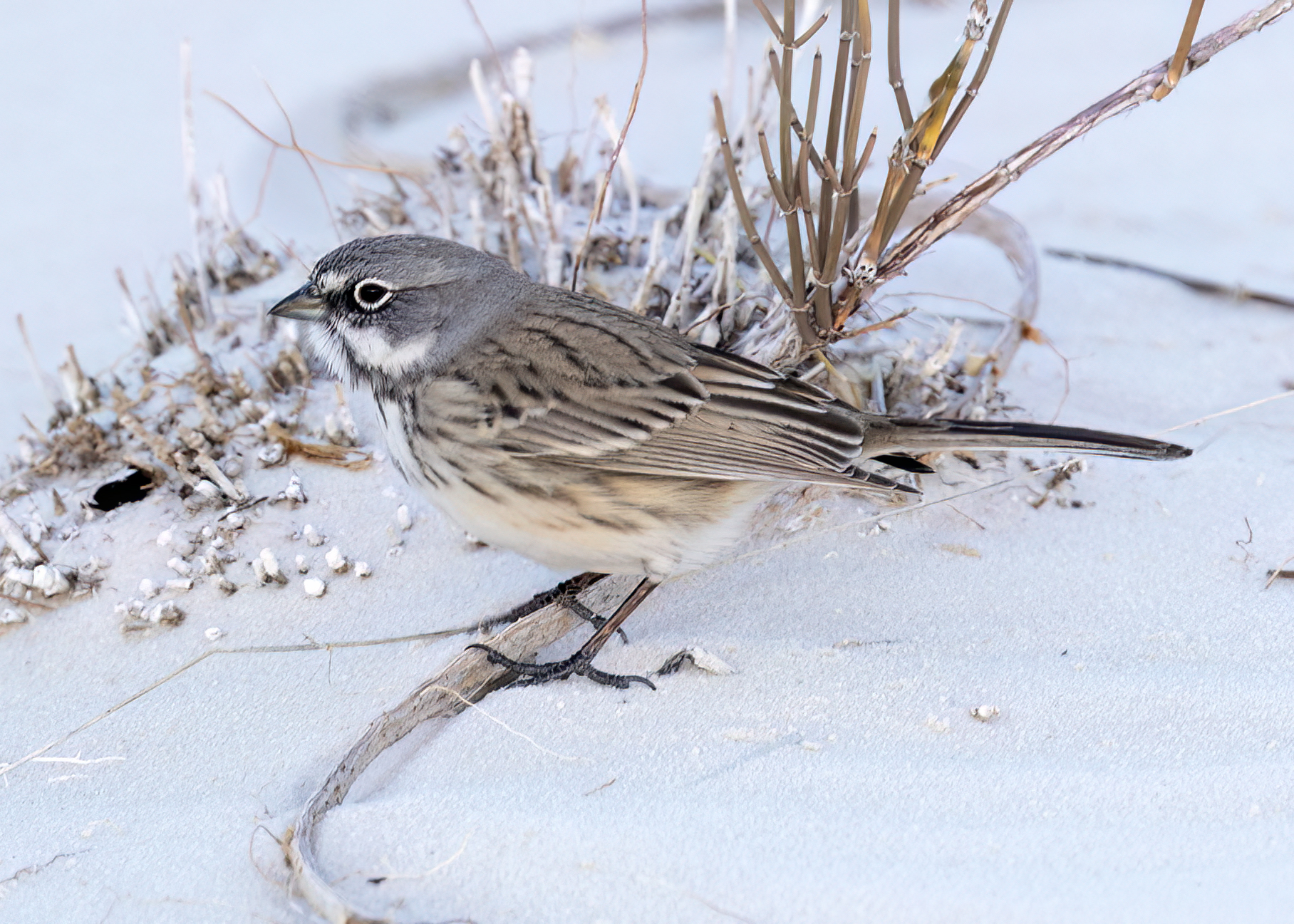

Conservation status
- Least Concern (IUCN 3.1)

Scientific classification
- Kingdom: Animalia
- Phylum: Chordata
- Class: Aves
- Order: Passeriformes
- Family: Passerellidae
- Genus: Artemisiospiza
- Species: A. nevadensis

Binomial name
- Artemisiospiza nevadensis (Ridgway, 1874)

= Sagebrush sparrow =

Species of bird

The sagebrush sparrow (Artemisiospiza nevadensis) is a species of bird in the family Passerellidae, the New World sparrows. It is found in Mexico and the United States.

== Taxonomy and systematics ==
The sagebrush sparrow has a complicated taxonomic history. It was formally described in 1874 as a subspecies of what was then Bell's sparrow; it was assigned the trinomial Poospiza belli nevadensis and the name "Artemisia sparrow". Bell's sparrow was later reassigned to genus Amphispiza that had also been erected in 1874 and was also given the new English name "sage sparrow". In 2007 the new genus Artemisiospiza was suggested for the sage sparrow and in 2011 it was formally erected. Taxonomic systems began adopting the new assignment in 2012. In 2013 taxonomic systems split Artemisiospiza nevadensis from Artemisiospiza belli, gave it the English name sagebrush sparrow, and restored the English name "Bell's sparrow" to A. belli.

The sagebrush sparrow is monotypic.

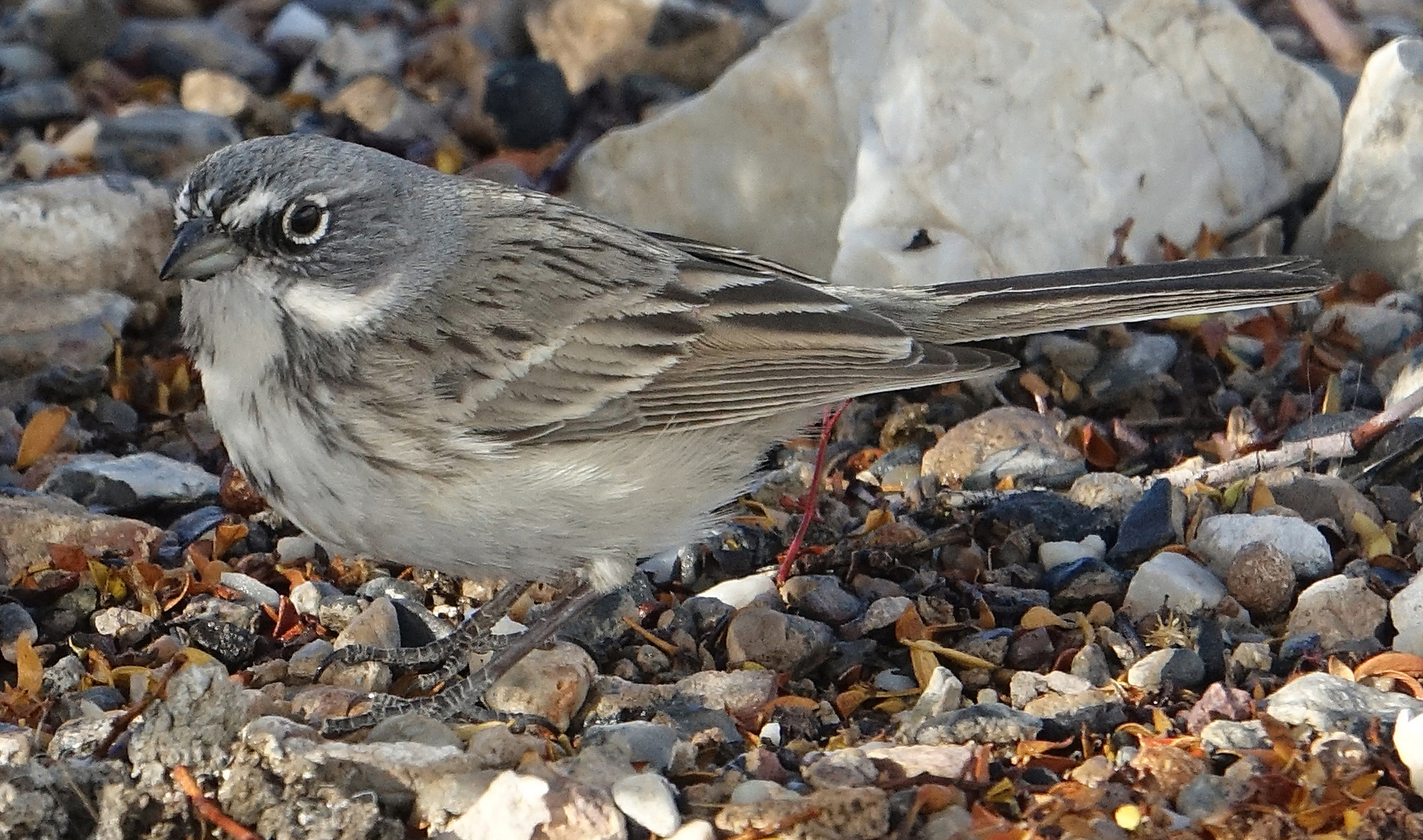
Sagebrush Sparrow

== Description ==
The sagebrush sparrow is about 12 to 15 cm (4.7 to 5.9 in) long and weighs about 15 to 22 g (0.53 to 0.78 oz). Males are larger than females but the sexes have the same plumage. Adults in fresh plumage have a mostly pale to medium gray head and nape. They have dusky gray lores, a white to buff-white patch above them, a white eye-ring, and sometimes a faint white supercilium and dark line behind the eye. They have a white streak below the ear coverts with sometimes a thin black stripe below it. Their back, rump, and uppertail coverts are brownish with fuscous streaks on the back. Their tail is brownish black with white outer webs on the outermost pair of feathers. Their wing's lesser coverts are grayish brown. Its median and greater coverts are dark brown with whitish to pale rufous tips that form two wing bars when folded. Their flight feathers are blackish brown with pale rufous edges on the outer webs. Their throat and underparts are mostly white with sometimes a small black spot in the center of the breast. Their flanks are pale buff with brown streaks. Both sexes have a hazel brown iris, a charcoal-gray maxilla, a pale gray-blue mandible, and dark grayish brown or brown legs and feet.

== Distribution and habitat ==
The sagebrush sparrow has a somewhat disjunct distribution in most of the mountain western United States and south into northern Mexico. One population is in west-central Washington. Another small one is in northeastern Wyoming. The very large contiguous range (breeding and non-breeding) extends in the U. S. from western Oregon, southeastern and southwestern Idaho, and western and central Wyoming south through eastern California, all of Nevada, and western Colorado to all of Arizona, northwestern and southern New Mexico, and far western Texas. That range continues into Mexico in northeastern Baja California Norte, central and western Sonora, and much of Chihuahua. There are records of vagrants along the west coast from British Columbia south and further east of its core range in Montana, Wyoming, Colorado, Kansas, Oklahoma, and Nebraska. There are also single records in Kentucky and Nova Scotia.

In its breeding range the sagebrush sparrow is strongly associated with big sagebrush (Artemisia tridentata). However, it is not confined to pure stands of the shrub but often is found in areas where it is mixed with bitterbrush (Purshia species), saltbush (Atriplex species), greasewood (Sarcobatus vermiculatus), and other shrubs. In migration and on the wintering grounds it also favors the same mix as in its breeding range but also includes arid grasslands, scrublands with cactus, and areas with yucca or mixed Prosopis glandulosa mesquite and inkweed (Suaeda torreqana).

== Behavior ==
=== Movement ===
The sagebrush sparrow is almost entirely migratory. It is found year-round in a small area of western Nevada and in a larger area of southeastern Nevada and southwestern Utah. However, it is not clear if individuals there are resident or a mix of migrants and residents. It breeds in the part of its range north from east-central California, southern Nevada, northeastern Arizona, and northwestern New Mexico. It vacates that area after the breeding season, except for the small year-round ranges within it, and winters from there to the southern edge of its range in northern Mexico.

=== Feeding ===
During the breeding season the sagebrush sparrow feeds on adult and larval insects, spiders, seeds, small fruits, and other plant parts. In the non-breeding season it feeds mostly on seeds. It forages mostly on the ground, usually under or near shrubs, but will glean above the ground in vegetation. It hops or walks while foraging. During the breeding season it is usually seen in pairs. In winter it is often in small flocks that sometimes include other sparrow species.

=== Breeding ===
Overall the sagebrush sparrow breeds between April and August though there are latitudinal differences within that window. Most migratory songbirds pair on the breeding grounds but many sagebrush sparrows form pairs during winter. Females build the nest, an open cup made from twigs and coarse grass lined with fine grass, feathers, and hair. They are usually placed in a shrub but some are in a bunchgrass clump and others directly on the ground. In a study of 61 clutches the count was one to four eggs with a mean of about 3.3. The eggs are pale blue or bluish white with brown to red-brown markings of different shapes. The incubation period is 10 to 16 days after the last egg of a clutch is laid, and usually only the female incubates though the male may spell her for short periods. Fledging occurs nine to ten days after hatch. Females brood the nestlings at night; both parents provision them. Most pairs raise two broods in a season.

=== Vocalization ===
Only male sagebrush sparrows sing, and do so throughout the breeding season. The song is described as a "series of short musical buzzes on different frequencies with abrupt beginnings and endings". Males sing from atop a shrub or just below its top. The species' contact call is a "short musical tink" that often is repeated. It also makes a "sharper and shorter" warning call.

== Status ==
The IUCN has assessed the sagebrush sparrow as being of Least Concern. It has an extremely large range; its estimated population of at least 5.4 million mature individuals is believed to be stable. No immediate threats have been identified. It is considered common throughout its range. "Habitat loss in Great Basin and other shrub-dominated ecosystems by mechanical, chemical, and burning methods to remove big sagebrush and increase grasses and forbs for livestock grazing has probably had significant impact on Sagebrush Sparrow distribution, productivity, and long-term population trends."
