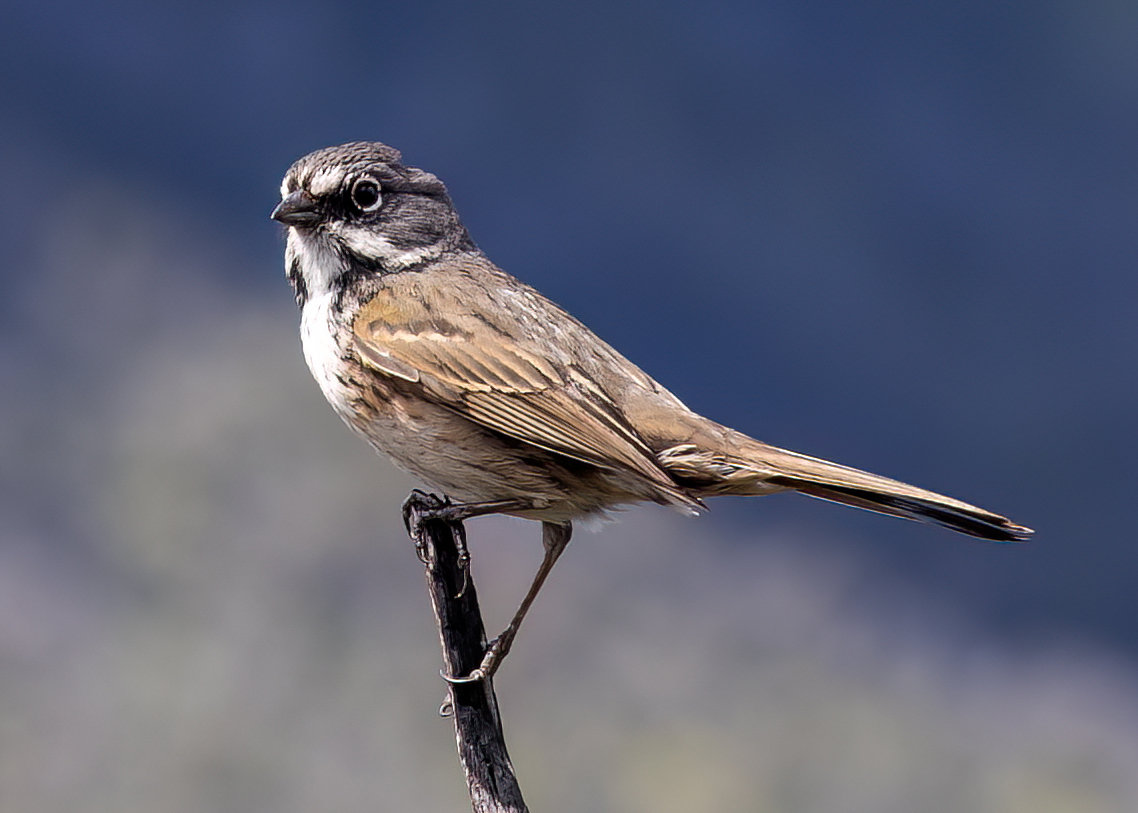

Conservation status
- Least Concern (IUCN 3.1)

Scientific classification
- Kingdom: Animalia
- Phylum: Chordata
- Class: Aves
- Order: Passeriformes
- Family: Passerellidae
- Genus: Artemisiospiza
- Species: A. belli

Binomial name
- Artemisiospiza belli (Cassin, 1850)

= Bell's sparrow =

Species of bird

Bell's sparrow (Artemisiospiza belli) is a species of bird in the family Passerellidae, the New World sparrows. It is found in Mexico and the United States.

== Taxonomy and systematics ==
Bell's sparrow has a complicated taxonomic history. It was formally described in 1850 with the binomial Emberiza belli. Its specific epithet and later English name honor John Graham Bell, who discovered and collected the lectotype. Bell's sparrow was later reassigned to genus Amphispiza that was erected in 1874 and was also given the English name "sage sparrow". In 2007 the new genus Artemisiospiza was suggested for the sage sparrow and in 2011 it was formally erected. Taxonomic systems began adopting the new assignment in 2012.

The further taxonomy of Bell's sparrow is unsettled. The IOC and AviList assign it these three subspecies:

- A. b. canescens (Grinnell, 1905)
- A. b. belli (Cassin, 1850)
- A. b. cinerea (Townsend, 1890)

As of late 2025 the Clements taxonomy and BirdLife International's Handbook of the Birds of the World (HBW) assign a fourth subspecies, A. b. clementeae (Ridgway, 1898) that the others include in A. b. belli.

What is now the sagebrush sparrow (Artemisiospiza nevadensis) was originally also treated as a subspecies of A. belli. In 2013 taxonomic systems recognized it as a full species and restored the English name "Bell's sparrow" to A. belli.

This article primarily follows the three-subspecies model with some notes about the putative A. b. clementeae.

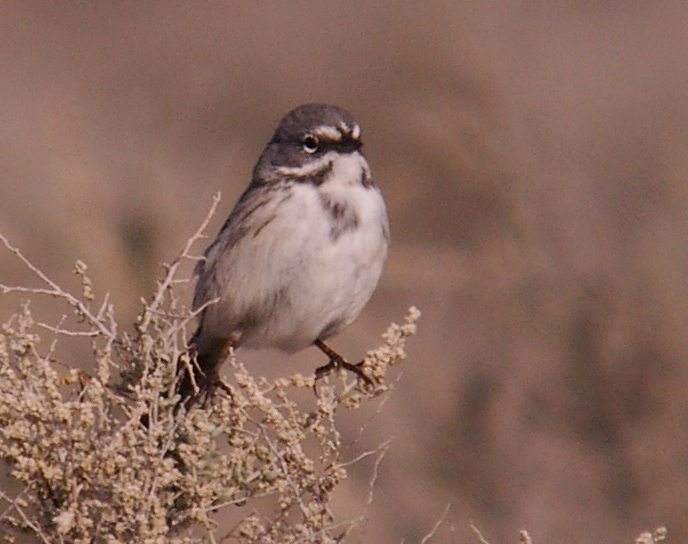
Bell's sparrow (A. b. canescens)

== Description ==
Bell's sparrow is about 12 to 15 cm (4.7 to 5.9 in) long and weighs about 13 to 17 g (0.46 to 0.60 oz). Males are larger than females but the sexes have the same plumage. Adults in fresh plumage have a mostly dark gray head and nape. They have dusky blackish lores, a white patch above them, a white eye-ring, and sometimes a faint whitish supercilium and dark line behind the eye. They have a white streak below the ear coverts with a black stripe below it. Their back, rump, and uppertail coverts are brownish with very indistinct fuscous streaks on the back. Their tail is brownish black with white outer webs on the outermost pair of feathers. Their wing's lesser coverts are dark grayish brown. Its median and greater coverts are blacklish with whitish to rufous tips that form two faint wing bars when folded. Their flight feathers are blackish brown with pale rufous edges on the outer webs. Their throat and underparts are mostly white with a small black spot in the center of the breast. Their flanks, vent, and undertail coverts have a pale brown wash and the flanks have darker brown streaks. Subspecies A. b. canescens is larger than the nominate, with a paler back but more distinct black streaks and light beige edges on the outermost tail feathers. A. b. cinerea is paler than the nominate with a sandy brown back that is only slightly streaked. Both sexes of all subspecies have a hazel brown iris, a charcoal-gray maxilla, a pale gray-blue mandible, and brown legs and feet. When A. b. clementeae is treated separately it is described as being like a pale nominate.

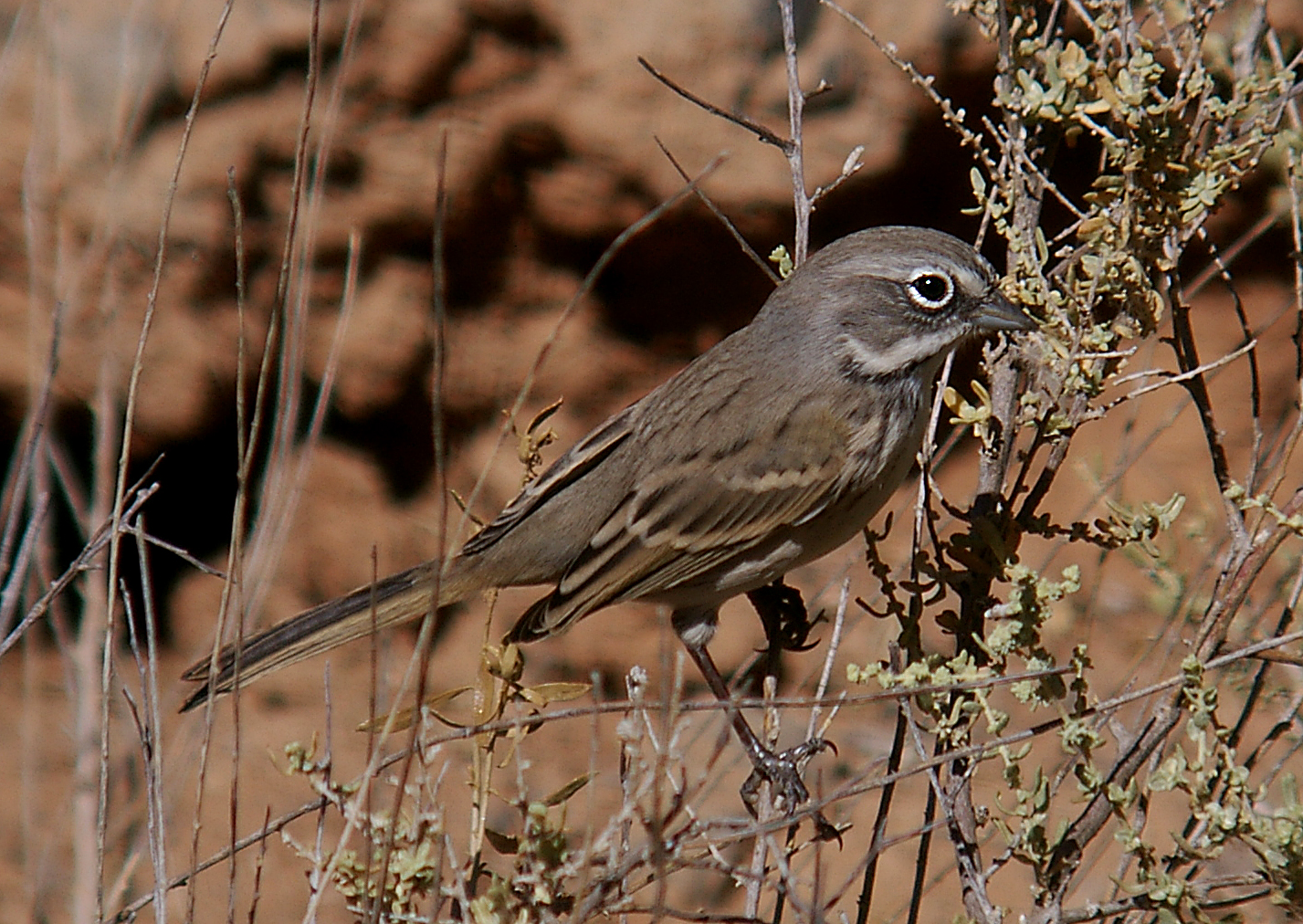
Bell's sparrow (A. b. canescens)

== Distribution and habitat ==
The nominate subspecies of Bell's sparrow is the northernmost. It is found from Trinity and Shasta counties in northwestern California south along the coast ranges into far northwestern Baja California. It has an isolated population on the west side of the Sierra Nevada in central California. It also includes the population on San Clemente Island that Clements and HBW treat as A. b. clementeae. Subspecies A. b. cinerea is found from the northern Baja Peninsula south to northern Baja California Sur. A. b. canescens is found from the southern San Joaquin Valley in California east into far southern Nevada and south into Sonora, Mexico, and from southern California east into the Sonoran Desert as far as southwestern Arizona. However, AviList and Clements do not include Nevada, Arizona, and Mexico in canescens' range.

Bell's sparrow inhabits somewhat open shrubby habitat that often is dominated by sagebrush (Artemisia species). The nominate is found in coastal chaparral and sagebrush scrublands. The other two subspecies are in desert scrublands that host sagebrush, bitterbrush (Purshia species), saltbush (Atriplex species), and other shrubs.

== Behavior ==
=== Movement ===
Bell's sparrow is a partial migrant. Most members of the nominate and A. b. canescens subspecies are year-round residents, and all of A. b. cinerea are believed to be. Some members of the northernmost population of the nominate migrate south after the breeding season. Some members of A. b. canescens leave their California and Nevada breeding areas and move to southeastern California, western Arizona, and northern Sonora. Some also make elevational movements, going higher after breeding.

=== Feeding ===
During the breeding season Bell's sparrow feeds on adult and larval insects, spiders, seeds, small fruits, and other plant parts. In the non-breeding season it feeds mostly on seeds. It forages mostly on the ground, usually under or near shrubs, but will glean above the ground in vegetation. It hops or walks while foraging. During the breeding season it is usually seen in pairs. In winter it sometimes gathers in small flocks that may include other sparrow species.

=== Vocalization ===
Only male Bell's sparrows sing, and do so throughout the breeding season though song frequency declines as the season progresses. The song is described as jumbled, warbled, and buzzy, and each individual has several variations of its song. Males sing from atop a shrub or just below its top. The species' contact call is a "short musical tink" that often is repeated as a twitter. It also makes a "dzweet" call.

== Status ==
The IUCN has assessed Bell's sparrow as being of Least Concern. It has a large range; its estimated population of 270,000 mature individuals is believed to be stable. No immediate threats have been identified. It is considered "quite common in some areas". The population on San Clemente Island was listed as Endangered under the Endangered Species Act because introduced pigs and goats had destroyed much of its habitat. Once they were removed, native vegetation rebounded and the bird's population stabilized and then increased. It was delisted from the ESA in 2023.
