= List of Sarah Lawrence College people =

The following is a list of notable individuals associated with Sarah Lawrence College through attendance as a student, or service as a member of the faculty or staff.

== Alumni ==
Select notables

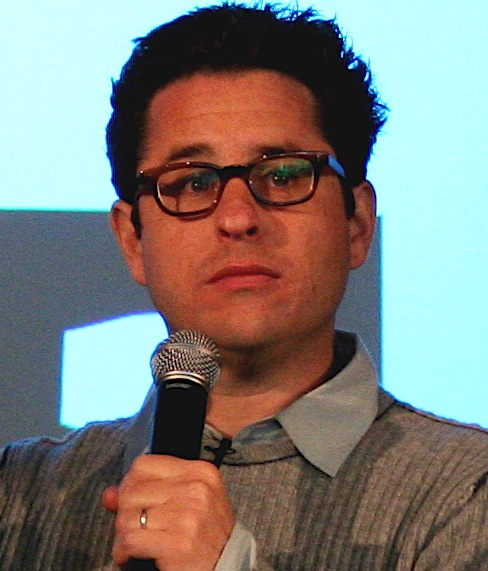
J. J. Abrams, film and television producer, writer, actor, composer, director

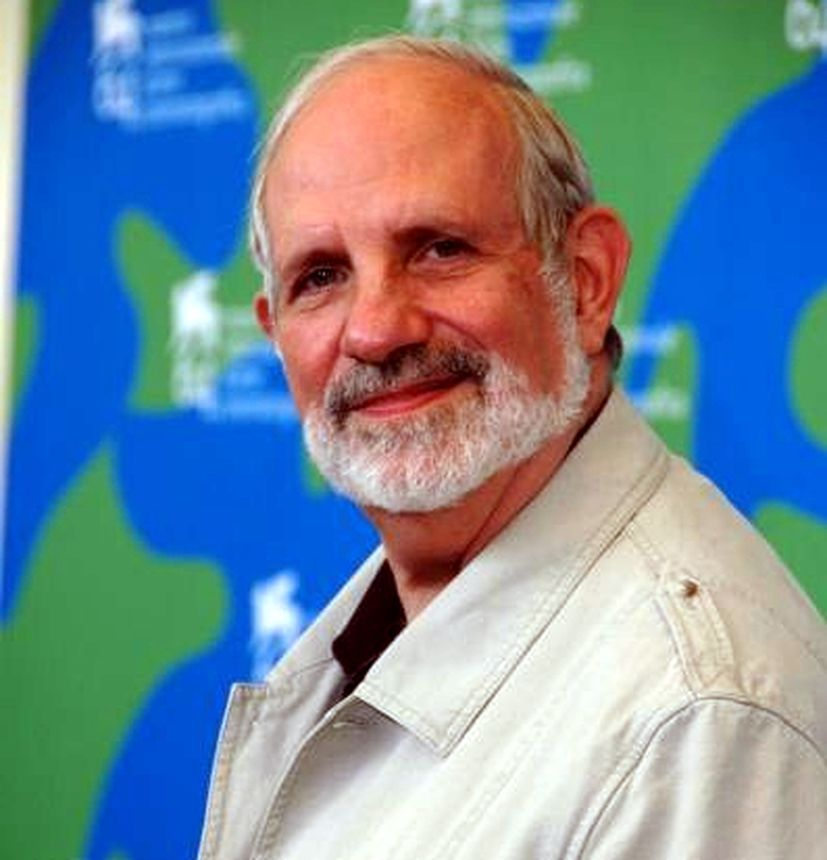
Brian De Palma, film director

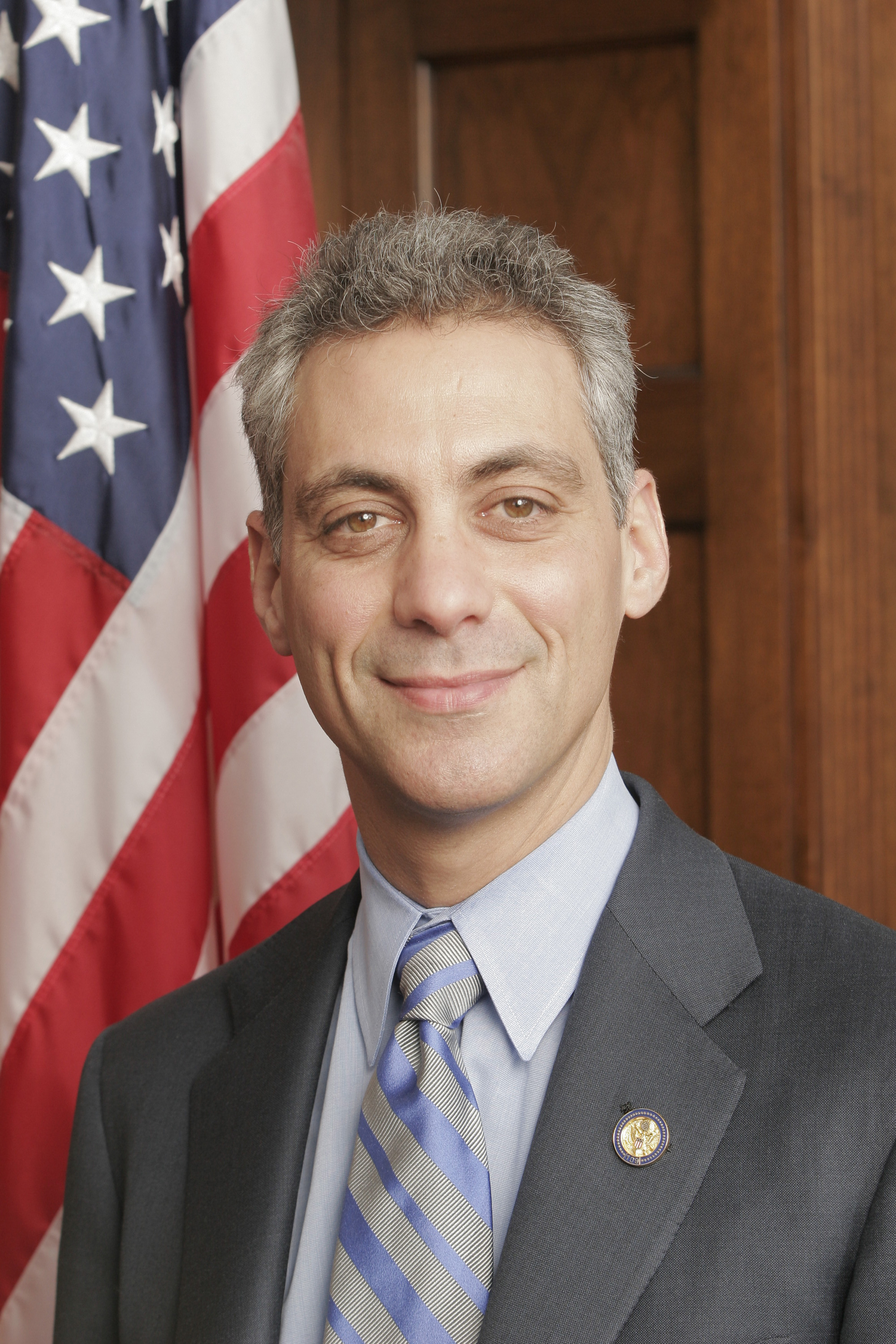
Rahm Emanuel, politician

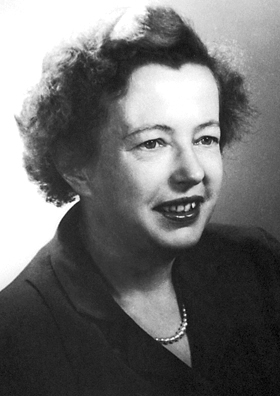
Maria Goeppert-Mayer, physicist

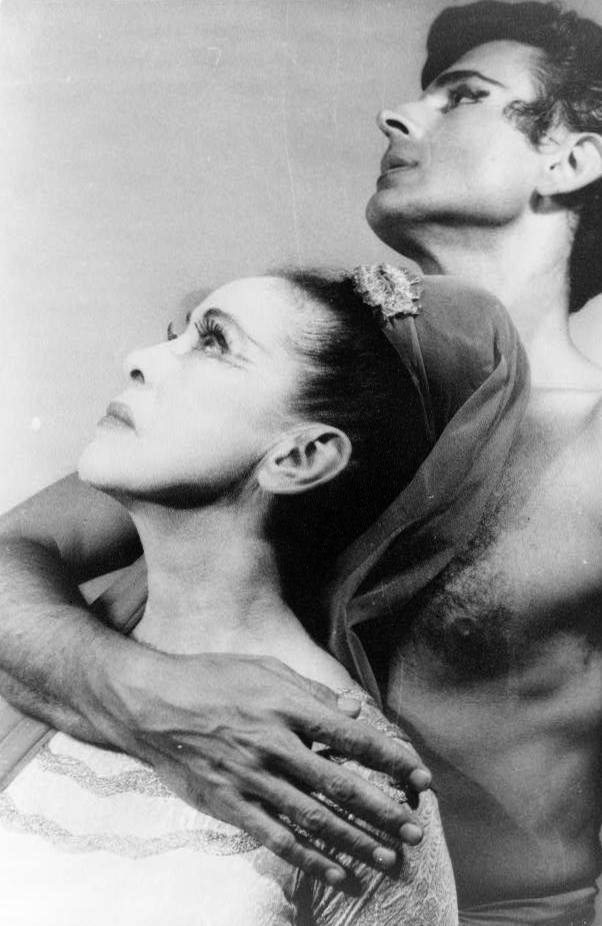
Martha Graham, dancer and choreographer

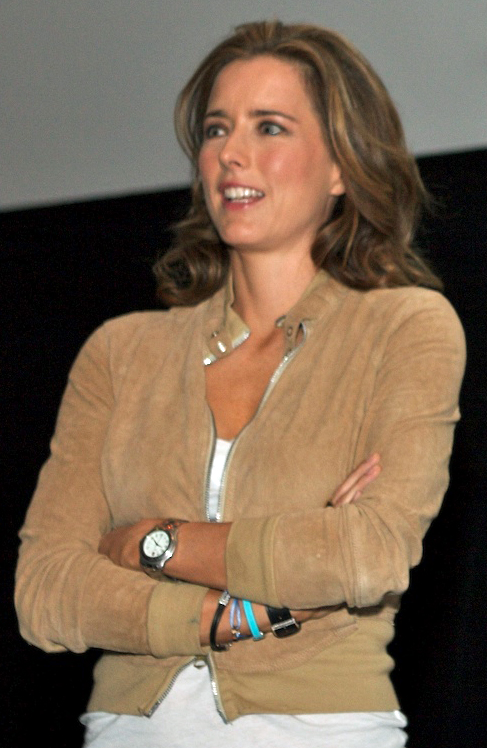
Tea Leoni, actress and producer

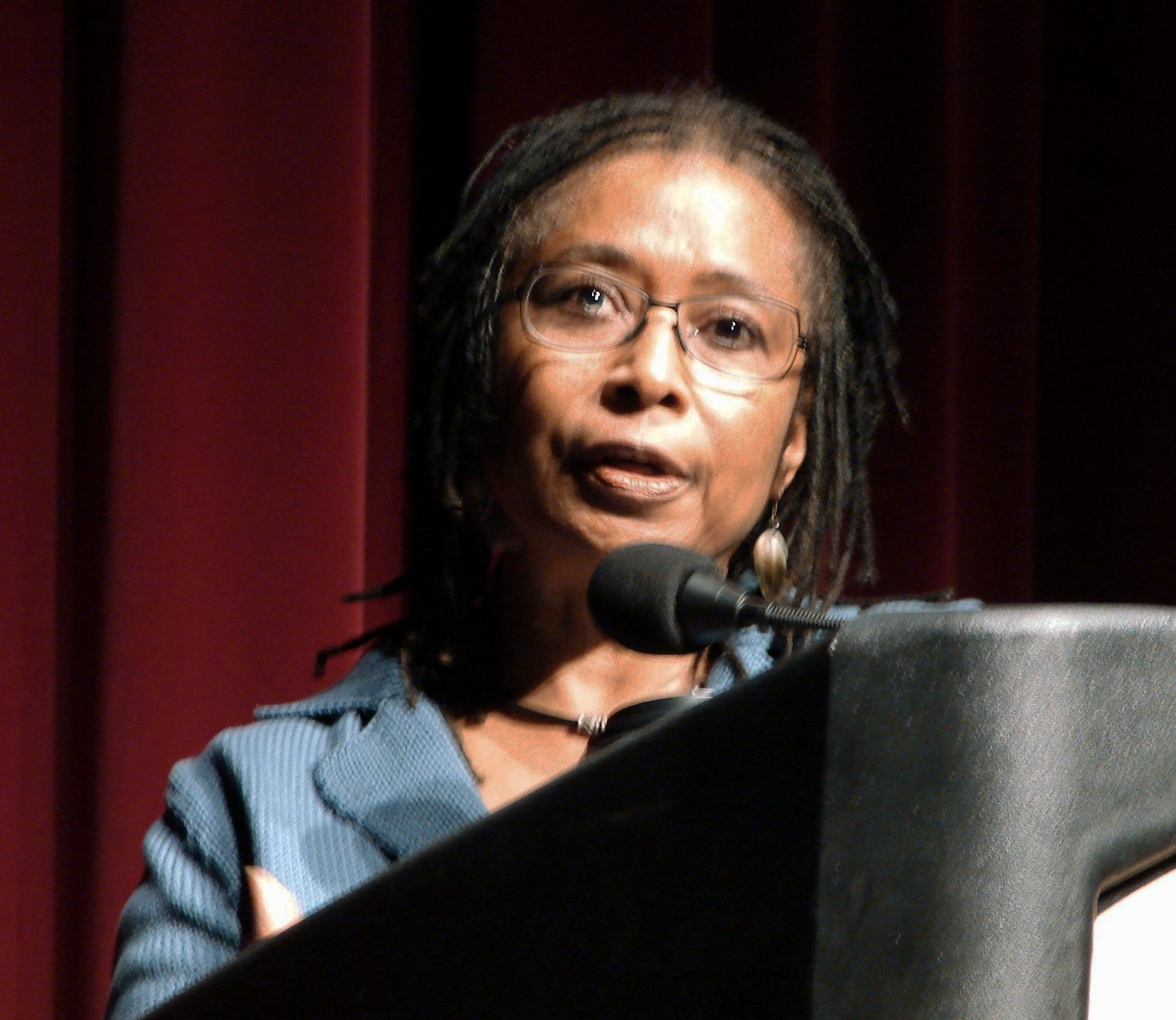
Alice Walker, author

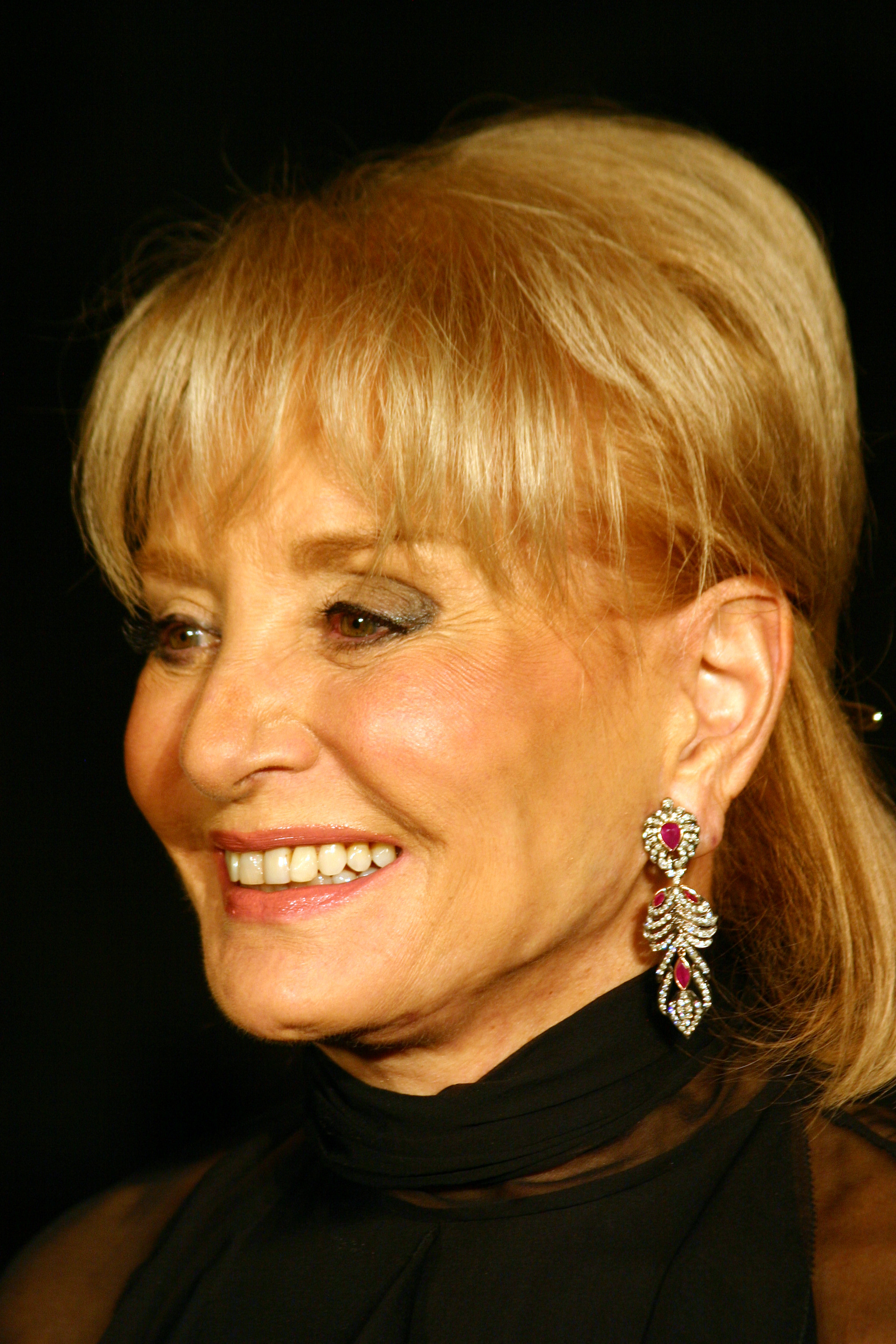
Barbara Walters, journalist, writer, and media personality

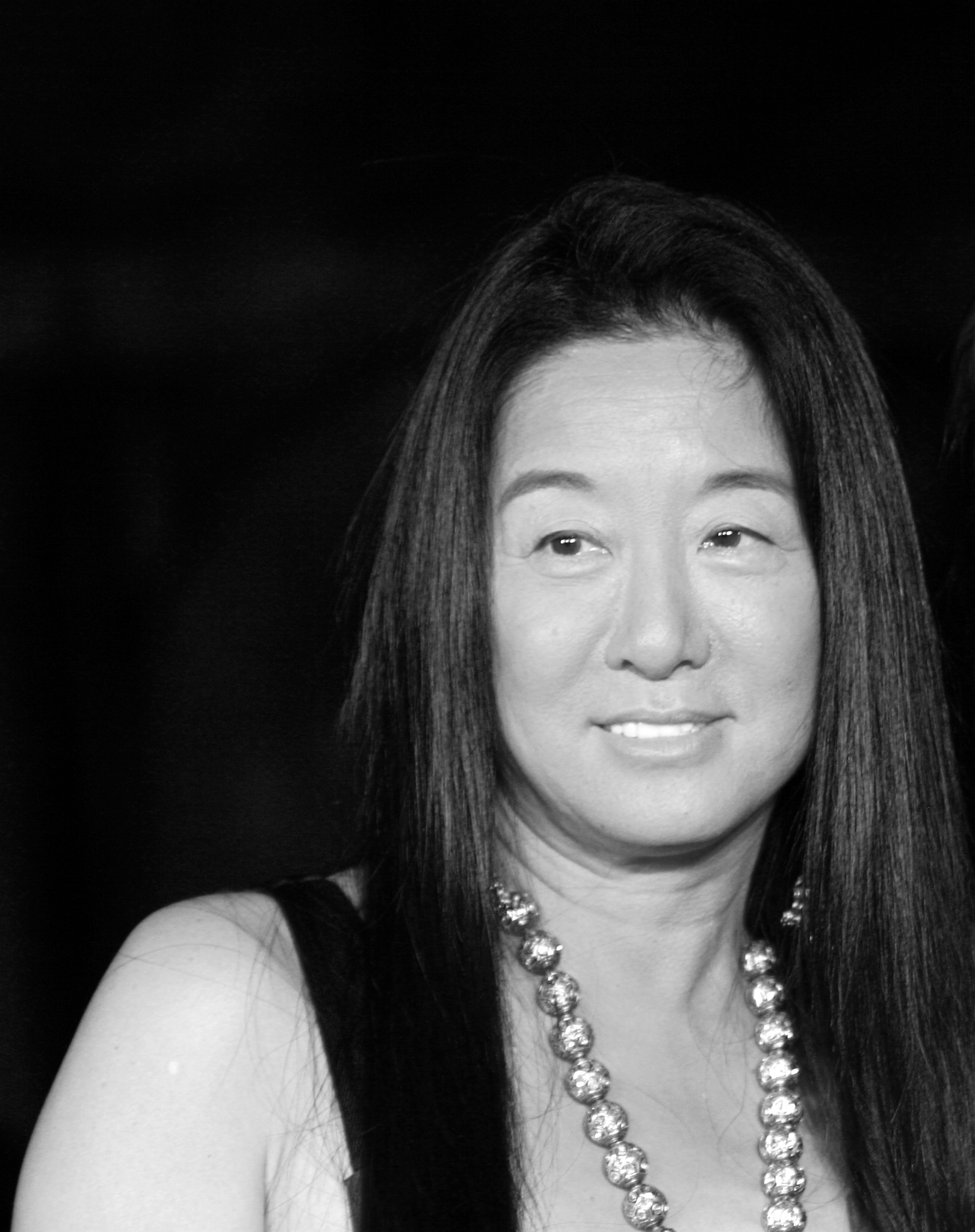
Vera Wang, fashion designer

=== Entertainment and media ===
- Abiola Abrams, TV personality, writer and filmmaker
- J. J. Abrams, film and television producer, writer, actor, composer, and director
- Jane Alexander, actress, author
- Jon Avnet, film producer, director, and writer
- Dylan Brody, playwright, author and stand-up comedian
- Golden Brooks, actress
- Yancy Butler, actress
- Gabrielle Carteris, actress
- Durga Chew-Bose, author and film director
- Austin Chick, filmmaker, screenwriter, and producer
- Jill Clayburgh, actress
- Brian De Palma, film director
- Cary Elwes, actor
- DoNormaal, rapper and actress
- Beverly Emmons, dance and Broadway lighting designer
- Rachel Feldman, screenwriter and director
- Tovah Feldshuh, actor
- William Finley, actor
- Carrie Fisher, actress, writer
- Robin Givens, actor
- Adam Goldberg, actor
- Peter Gould, television writer, director and producer
- G Hannelius, actress, singer and YouTube personality
- Melora Hardin, actress
- Jessica Harper, actress
- Noah Hawley screenwriter, director, and author
- Katharine Houghton, actress and playwright
- Janine Jackson, journalist and activist
- Reo Jones, voice actor
- Stacey Kent, jazz singer
- Sarah Kernochan, writer, producer, and director
- Téa Leoni, actress
- David Lindsay-Abaire, playwright and screenwriter
- Robert Lyons, playwright and director
- Eric Mabius, actor
- Consuelo Mack, business news journalist
- Julianna Margulies, Emmy Award-winning actress
- Ivy Meeropol, film director
- Larisa Oleynik, actress
- Alice Pearce, actress
- Jordan Peele, film director, actor, comedian
- Holly Robinson Peete, actress
- Sam Robards, actor
- Amy Robinson, film producer and actress
- Elisabeth Röhm, actress
- Kyra Sedgwick, Emmy Award-winning actress
- Natalie Shaw, actress
- Joan Micklin Silver, award-winning director
- Sabiha Sumar, director
- Aly Tadros, singer-songwriter
- Misti Traya, actress
- Guinevere Turner, actor, producer, and writer
- James Veitch, comedian
- Barbara Walters, television personality
- Sigourney Weaver, actress
- Merritt Wever, actress
- Jeff Williams, actor
- Joanne Woodward, actress, political activist

=== Music ===
- Max Bemis, singer and songwriter
- Win Butler, musician
- Alice Cohen, singer and songwriter
- Margaret Fiedler, musician
- Girlyman, folk-rock trio of Nate Borofsky, Ty Greenstein and Doris Muramatsu
- Lesley Gore, singer and songwriter
- Susie Ibarra, musician and composer
- Diana Jones, singer-songwriter
- Ira Kaplan, musician
- Zoë Keating, musician
- Stacey Kent, vocalist
- Josh Mancell, freelance composer and multi-instrumentalist
- Rhett Miller, singer/songwriter and member of the band Old 97's
- David Porter, composer
- JD Samson, musician
- Carly Simon, singer and songwriter
- Joanna Simon, vocalist
- Dana Williams, singer-songwriter, guitarist, and poet

=== Politics and public service ===
- Brooke Anderson, diplomat;
- Lisa Anderson, academic
- Amanda Burden, public planning
- Robert Dawson, politician
- Rahm Emanuel, politician
- Sharon Hom, attorney, professor, activist
- Sue Kelly, politician
- Clifford D. May, journalist, activist
- Gloria Schaffer, politician

=== Writing and poetics ===
- G. D. Baum, writer
- Melvin Jules Bukiet, novelist
- Kevin Coogan, investigative journalist
- Nicole Dennis-Benn, novelist
- Carolyn Ferrell, writer
- Amanda Foreman, award-winning biographer
- Louise Gluck, poet
- Rebecca Godfrey, novelist
- Philip Graham, writer
- Lucy Grealy, writer
- Karl Taro Greenfeld, journalist and author
- David Grimm, playwright
- Allan Gurganus, writer
- Maggie Haberman, journalist
- Benjamin Hale, novelist
- Justin Haythe, novelist and screenwriter
- Kaui Hart Hemmings, writer
- A.M. Homes, writer
- Nancy Huston, Canadian author
- Leah Johnson, novelist
- Porochista Khakpour, writer
- Carolyn Kizer, poet
- Christian Kracht, Swiss writer
- Phillis Levin, poet
- Heather Lewis, author
- Myra Cohn Livingston, children's poet
- Bennett Madison, writer
- Jeffrey McDaniel, poet
- Brian Morton, novelist
- Sharyn November, editor
- Ann Patchett, author
- Anne Roiphe, novelist and essayist
- Esmeralda Santiago, Puerto Rican writer
- Alice Sheldon, who published science fiction as James Tiptree, Jr.
- Leora Skolkin-Smith, novelist
- Alice Walker, novelist

=== Visual and performing arts ===
- Carolyn Adams, dancer, choreographer, teacher
- Janine Antoni, sculptor, installation artist
- Ian Spencer Bell, choreographer
- Mary Griggs Burke, art collector
- Lucinda Childs, dancer and choreographer
- Alexis de Chaunac, contemporary artist
- Nancy Proskauer Dryfoos (BA 1936), sculptor
- Jean Erdman, dancer
- Mary Heilmann, painter, sculptor
- Dan Hurlin, writer, choreographer, actor
- John Jasperse, choreographer, dancer, and artist
- Gloria Kisch, sculptor
- Linda McCartney, photographer; was married to musician Paul McCartney
- Susan Meiselas, photographer and photojournalist
- Meredith Monk, composer, singer and choreographer
- Cady Noland, visual artist
- Jedd Novatt, sculptor and painter
- Yoko Ono, artist and musician
- Maureen Paley, art dealer
- Meridel Rubenstein, photographer and installation artist
- Christina Saj, artist
- Sonia Sekula, painter
- Alice Louise Judd Simpich, sculptor
- Holly Solomon, art dealer
- Alec Soth, photographer
- Nancy Spector, chief curator of the Guggenheim Museum, NY
- Ruth Carter Stevenson (1945), patron of the arts
- Vera Wang, fashion designer

=== Other notable alumni ===
- Karen Adolph, psychologist and professor
- Alice Brock, former restaurateur turned artist
- Nancy Cantor, academic administrator
- Pema Chödrön, author, first American Buddhist
- Hope Cooke, Queen consort of Sikkim from 1963 to 1975, author
- Cornelia Fort, pioneer aviator
- Susan Houde-Walter, businesswoman
- Ian Lipkin, public health expert
- Jean Baker Miller, feminist, psychoanalyst, social activist
- Lee Radziwill, actress, socialite
- Elisabeth Young-Bruehl, academic and psychotherapist

=== Fictional alumni ===
- Lloyd, of the HBO dramedy Entourage, is a Sarah Lawrence graduate, perhaps a sly reference to Rahm Emanuel, brother of Ari Emanuel, the real-life inspiration for Lloyd's boss, Ari Gold.
- Eric van der Woodsen, of the CW teen drama Gossip Girl
- Karen Walker, of the sitcom Will & Grace
- Kat Stratford, in the movie 10 Things I Hate About You
- Allison "Allie" Hamilton, in the movie The Notebook
- Jill Rosen, in the movie Baby It's You
- Guinevere Turner, co-screenwriter of American Psycho, has a cameo in the film
- Jenny Whiteman, of the movie Down and Out in Beverly Hills
- Mia Thermopolis, of Meg Cabot's Princess Diaries series
- Hero Brown, a character in Brian K. Vaughan and Pia Guerra's Y: The Last Man comic book series
- Marcia Jeffries from the 1957 film A Face in the Crowd studied music when she went east to Sarah Lawrence
- Gil Chesterton from sitcom Frasier
- Remy "Thirteen" Hadley of the Fox medical drama House
- "Sewage Joe" on the NBC sitcom Parks and Recreation is revealed to be an alumnus when he sends a lewd photograph to Ann from his alumni e-mail address.
- In J.D. Salinger's Franny and Zooey, a girl on a train is described as "absolutely... a Sarah Lawrence type... looked like she'd spent the whole train ride in the john, sculpting or painting or something, or as though she had a leotard on under her dress."
- In The Perks of Being a Wallflower, Charlie's older sister Candace has chosen to attend a “small liberal arts college back East called Sarah Lawrence.”
- Parker Posey's character in Broken English
- Charles Boyle, of NBC's police sitcom Brooklyn Nine-Nine
- Mary Andrews, played by Molly Ringwald on Riverdale, attended the show's fictional stand-in for the school, Sarah Florence.

== Faculty ==
=== Current ===
- Kirsten Agresta, harpist
- William Anderson, musician
- Colin Beavan, environmental activist and blogger
- Chester Biscardi, composer
- Melvin Jules Bukiet, novelist
- Jerrilynn Dodds, art historian,
- Thomas Sayers Ellis, poet
- Beverly Emmons, dance and Broadway lighting designer
- Fawaz Gerges, international relations
- Mark Helias, musician
- Marie Howe, poet
- William Melvin Kelley, novelist and short story writer
- Eduardo Lago, novelist
- Maria Negroni, poet
- Victoria Redel, poet, novelist, short fiction
- David Ryan, writer, drummer for The Lemonheads
- Vijay Seshadri, poet and essayist
- Jacob Slichter, musician
- Joel Sternfeld, photographer
- Malcolm Turvey, author, film historian, publisher
- Matilde Zimmermann, political activist

=== Former ===
- Glenda Adams, novelist
- Léonie Adams, poet
- Rudolf Arnheim
- Peter Cameron, novelist
- Joseph Campbell, cultural historian
- Suzanne Chazin, novelist
- Billy Collins, poet
- Dorothy DeLay, violin teacher
- Norman Dello Joio, composer
- Stephen Dobyns, poet
- E.L. Doctorow, writer
- Mark Doty, poet
- Cornelius Eady, poet
- Dana Gioia, poet
- Maria Goeppert-Mayer, physicist
- Irving Goldman, anthropologist
- Paul Goodman, writer
- Martha Graham, dancer and choreographer
- Allan Gurganus, writer
- Kimiko Hahn, poet
- Randall Jarrell, poet and writer
- Mary Karr, poet and writer
- Randall Kenan, writer
- Galway Kinnell, poet
- Jane Kramer, journalist
- Wilford Leach, director and screenwriter
- Max Lerner, journalist
- Tao Lin, writer
- Paul Lisicky, poet
- Tom Lux, poet
- Helen Lynd, sociologist
- Valerie Martin, writer
- David Maslanka, composer
- Mary McCarthy, writer
- Donald McKayle, dancer and choreographer
- Grace Paley, poet, writer, activist
- Gilberto Perez, author, film historian
- Santha Rama Rau, writer
- Judith Rodenbeck, art historian
- Franklin Delano Roosevelt, III, economist
- Theodore Roszak, sculptor
- Muriel Rukeyser, poet and political activist
- J.D. Salinger, writer
- Bessie Schonberg, dancer, choreographer
- William Schuman, composer
- Alan Shulman, composer and cellist
- David Smith, sculptor
- Susan Sontag, essayist, novelist, and activist
- Brooke Stevens, novelist
- Jean Valentine, poet
- Caroline F. Ware, New Deal activist
- Marguerite Yourcenar, writer

== Trustees ==
=== Former ===
- François-Henri Briard, attorney
