= José Luis Cuevas Museum =

Art museum in Mexico City, Mexico

Coordinates: 19°26′1.15″N 99°7′44.34″W

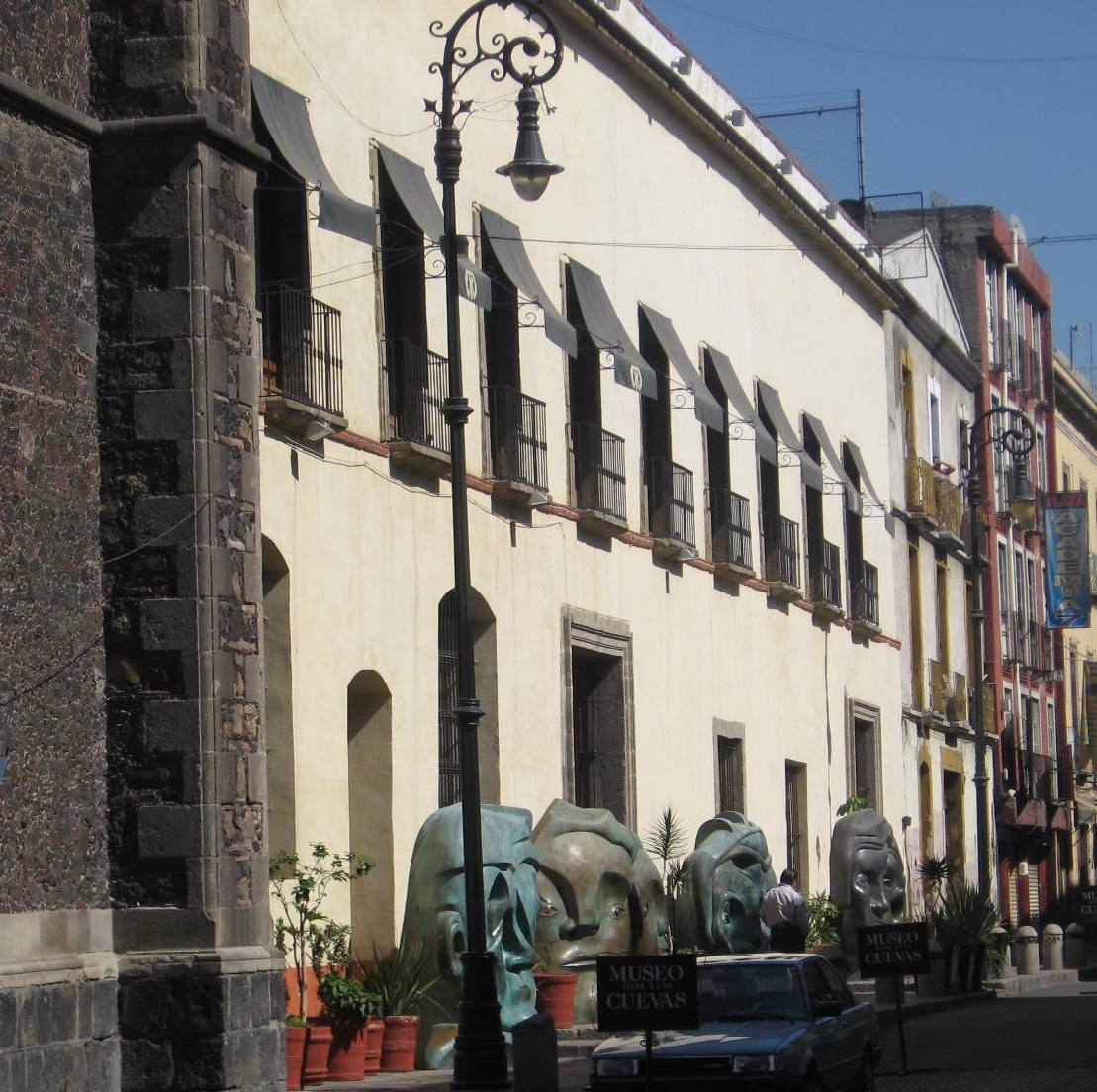
- The museum's facade
- Established: July 1992
- Location: 13 Academia Street, Historic center of Mexico City
- Founder: José Luis Cuevas
- Website: museojoseluiscuevas.com.mx

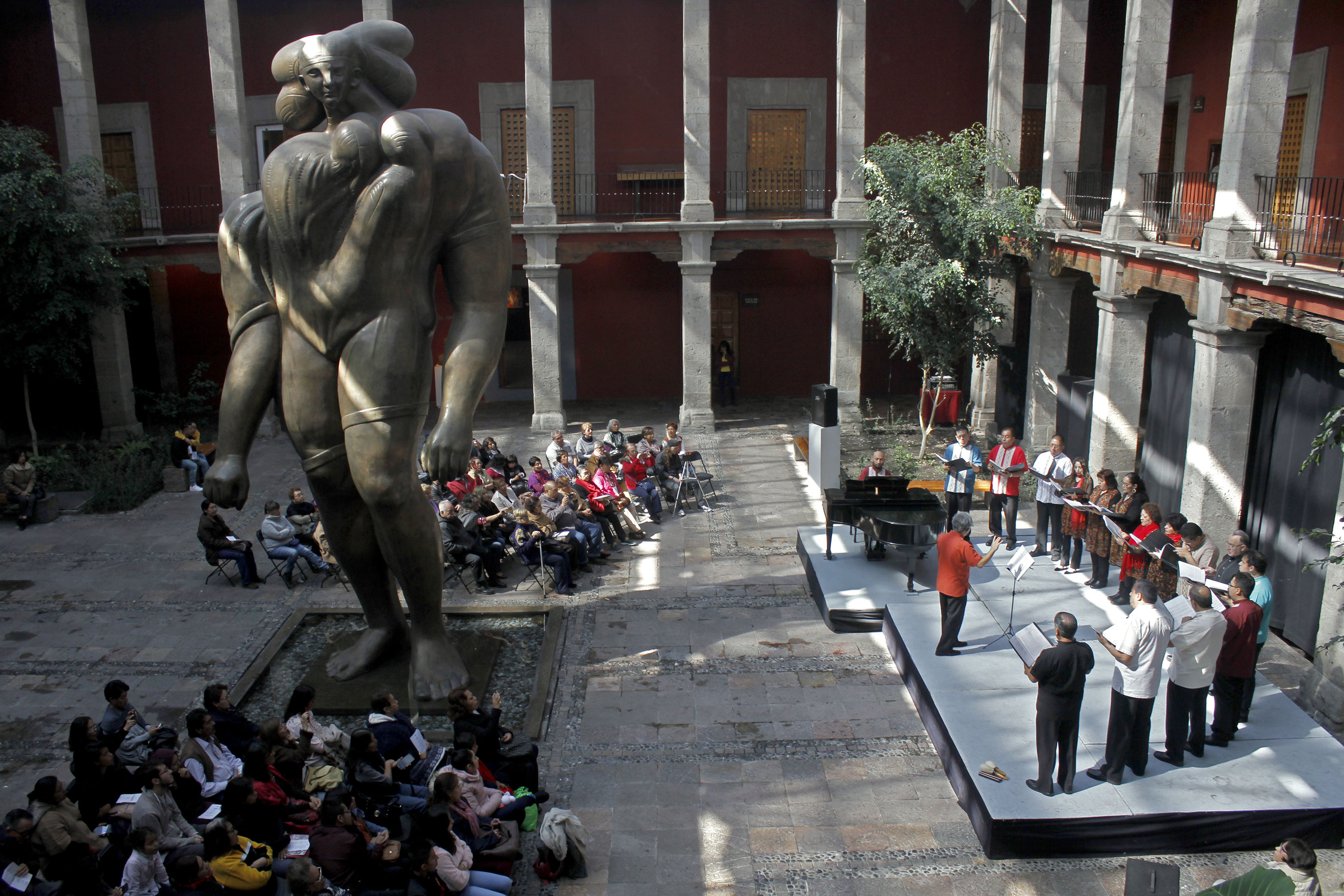
José Luis Cuevas Museum courtyard, with the sculpture La Gigantesca. On stage the Coro de la Ciudad de México

The José Luis Cuevas Museum is located just off the Zócalo within the Historic center of Mexico City, in Mexico City, Mexico. The museum and Church of Santa Inés were built as parts of the Convent of Santa Inés (Agnes of Rome) complex. The museum is in the convent's colonial era residential hall.

== Museum ==
By the late 1970s, artist José Luis Cuevas had gathered a large collection of modern artworks by Latin American artists, with the aim of establishing a museum in his name. The collection was kept in the storage facilities of the Carrillo Gil Museum as Cuevas looked for a suitable location for the collection. Having been born in the historic Centro district of Mexico City, Cuevas wanted the museum to be located there.

After acquiring the historic Santa Inés Convent building in 1983, and relocating its residents, the adaptive reuse project began. Cuevas, along with government agencies and private supporters set to restore the building and perform archeological work. It revealed many of the much older construction elements of the convent. Restoration work was completed in 1988.

While it was primarily restored to its colonial era appearance, Cuevas had the convent's courtyard roofed with a plastic dome to have a contrary and modern element. The complex was repaired under the patronage of the Marquis of La Cadena. The entrance of the museum is located at 13 Academia Street, around the corner from the Santa Inés Church. The courtyard's patio is dominated by a tall bronze sculpture named "La Giganta" (The Female Giant). Cuevas created this site specific sculpture for this space. The statue is 8 metres (26 ft) tall and weighs 8 tons.

The José Luis Cuevas Museum opened in July 1992.

=== Collections ===
The principal exhibition rooms contain artworks by Cuevas, including a room dedicated to works by him and his wife artist Bertha Cuevas, and the 'Pablo Picasso room' displaying his drawings.

The museum's collection also includes many artworks by 19th and 20th century Mexican artists, including: Francisco Toledo, Juan Soriano, Vicente Rojo Almazán, Manuel Felguérez, Arnold Belkin, Gabriel Macotela. In addition it has works by international modern artists, including Roberto Matta, Fernando de Szys-Varo, Leonora Carrington and Remedios Varo.
