= Convent of Santa Inés =

Convent in Mexico City

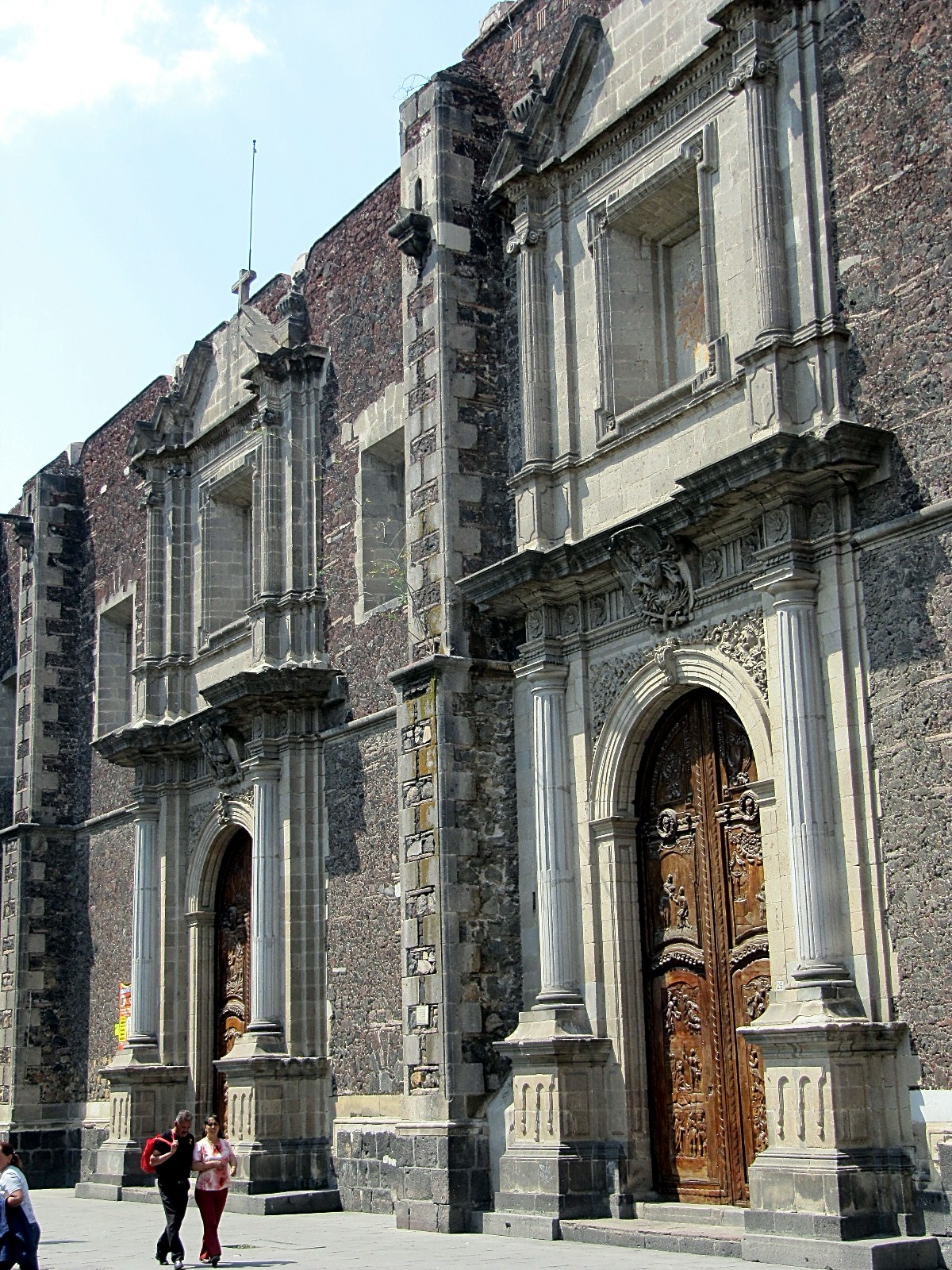
- The present day Church of Santa Inés was part of the Convent of Santa Inés

- Location within Mexico

Religion
- Affiliation: Catholic

Location
- Location: Mexico City
- Country: Mexico
- Interactive map of Convent of Santa Inés
- Coordinates: 19°26′01″N 99°07′45″W

Architecture
- Founder: Don Diego Caballero, Doña Inés de Velasco
- Funded by: Don Diego Caballero, Doña Inés de Velasco
- Established: 1600

The Convent of Santa Inés was a convent in Mexico City from 1600 to 1861, later separated into the present day Church of Santa Inés and José Luis Cuevas Museum, located just off the Zócalo within the Historic center of Mexico City.

== History ==
The convent was founded in 1600 by Don Diego Caballero and his wife Doña Inés de Velasco. Their patronage was funded by their ownership of the largest sugar cane processing operation in New Spain. The convent was originally built to accommodate 33 nuns, equal to the number of years Christ spent on earth. In colonial times, it also took in Spanish orphans who did not have a dowry. In return, these orphans were required to pray an hour a day for their benefactors.

The complex suffered damage in 1624 as a result of flooding and again in 1639 due to a fire. In 1710, its single tower was built, which was high enough to be seen from the main plaza of town. Towards the end of the 18th century, its ceiling was rotten, and the church and tower were cracked. The complex was repaired under the patronage of the Marquis of La Cadena.

The convent existed until 1861, when due to the Nationalization of Church Property Act, all convents and monasteries in the country were disbanded. The nuns here were moved first to Santa Teresa La Antigua then later to Santa Catalina de Siena. The tower was demolished, and the church and convent were separated with the convent's residence portion being sold into private hands due to the nationalization of church property at that time. The convent and Church of Santa Inés were declared a national monument in 1932, but it remained private property as tenements until the 1980s, when José Luis Cuevas bought the property with the intention to restoring it and establishing the current museum dedicated to his art and art of contemporary Latin America.

== See also ==
- List of colonial churches in Mexico City
