= Ximena Cuevas =

Mexican video performance artist

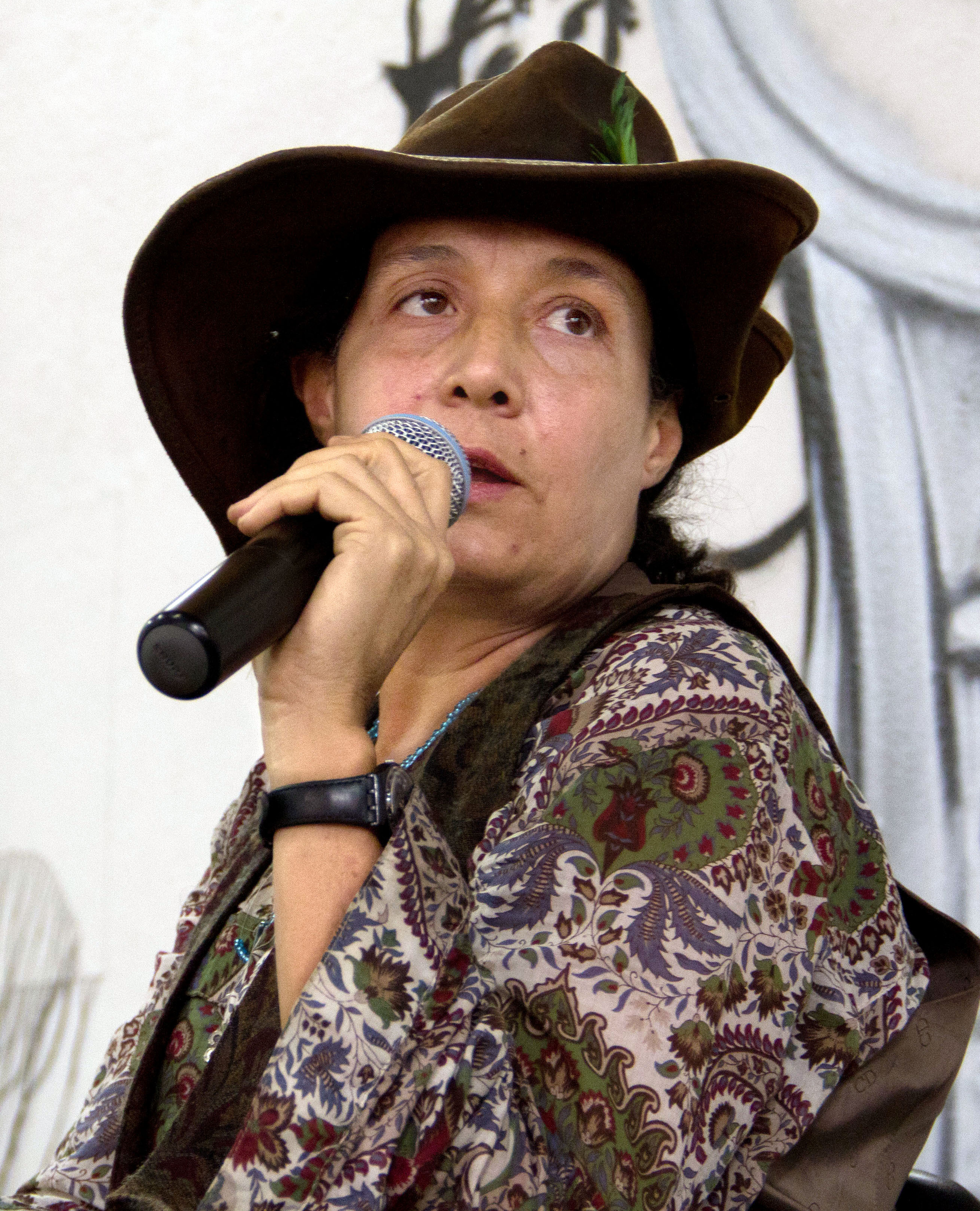
- Ximena Cuevas in 2011
- Born: 1963 (age 62–63)
- Known for: Video art; Performance art

Ximena Cuevas (born 1963) is a Mexican video performance artist. Her works often explore the social and gender issues facing lesbians in Mexico. Cuevas's videos and films have screened at Sundance, New York's Museum of Modern Art, the Guggenheim Museum,

She is one of the first videoartists in Mexico that was legitimized by cultural institutions. Her films have been shown in festivals such as Sundance, New York Film Festival, and the touring film series, Mexperimental Cinema. Among her noted works is a 1993 video clip entitled Corazon Sangrante. Her works has also being shown in art institutions such as Berkeley Art Museum, Contemporary Art Museum of San Diego, Museo Universitario de Arte Contemporáneo de la Ciudad de México, New York's Guggenheim Museum and Museum of Modern Art, which in 2001 added nine of her works to their video collection.

== Biography ==
Ximena Cuevas was born in 1963 in Mexico City. She is the second daughter of the marriage of Bertha Riestra., a psychologist and cultural promoter and José Luis Cuevas, a visual artist, whom had great influence on the early education of Ximena: “as a small child I was next to his drawing table, fascinated to see all those lines with their own life somehow(...)”

After living with her family different places such as Mexico City, Cuernavaca, Paris, and New York, Cuevas decided work in cinema, first as an assistant and later on, she continued to work with directors such as Konstantinos Costa-Gavras, John Schlesinger, John Huston, and Arturo Ripstein.

In 1979 she began working at the Cineteca Nacional National Film Archive in Mexico City repairing films by cutting scenes censored by the government. This experience inspired her interest in film and the moving image.

At the beginning of the 80s, motivated by the path open by Pola Weiss, Andrea di Castro y Sarah Minter, Cuevas started to consider experimental cinema a possibility for her artistic exploration, founding the collective Cosa Nostra in the 90s along with Rafael Curquidi, Doménico Campelo, Eduardo Vélez, and others, this was a kind of “intervention mafia” that pretended to insert film situations out of context.

After the projection in the Anthropology Museum in September 1992, this group was critically acclaimed by the writer Jorge Ayala Blanco on his article “Viva el Post Cine”.

This experiences guided by the desire of play had the logical consequence of a unique video language. The work of Cuevas is recognized as a relevant contribution to the context of the last two decades of the 20th century and the first decade of the 21st century, particularly in Mexico. Often her work is a commentary on culture, politics and social issues using irony, exploring this from a feminist perspective a women's role in contemporary society.

Lesbianism and gender identity are also recurrent themes in her work. Besides her artist career, she has also worked in production, coordination, and editing with Marcela Fernández Violante (for whom Ximena edited the short De cuerpo presente, 1997), Jesusa Rodriguez (Víctimas del Pecado Neoliberal, 1995) and Astrid Hadaad (Las Reinas Chulas], and in 2015, by invitation of Isela Vega, to work on the 40 year homage of the work by singer Juan Gabriel, a referent on Mexican popular culture. Since 2011 Cuevas lives on and off in the state of Guerrero and has been heavily involved in environmental conservation efforts with sea turtles.

== Work ==
Cuevas has been recognized as a significant contributor to videography by the Mexican government. Many of her films offer social commentary on corruption and its impact on culture, society and politics and explore from a feminist perspective the place of women in society. Lesbianism and its societal portrayal is also a recurring theme.

Beginning in 1990, after becoming disillusioned with traditional films being made both nationally and internationally, Cuevas purchased a camera and began producing her own films. She has received scholarships from the Mexican National Fund for Culture and the Arts (FONCA), the Fideicomiso para la Cultura México (Trust for Mexican Culture), an Eastman Kodak Worldwide Independent Filmmaker Production Grant among others and has made presentations at the Berkeley Art Museum and Pacific Film Archive, Museum of Contemporary Art San Diego and the Guggenheim of New York and Bilbao, Spain.

Cuevas' work is most known for its subtle irony of evaluating contemporary society and exposing the incongruity between social customs and beliefs versus the reality of living using a combination of truth and fiction. She deconstructs myths of the "typical middle-class Mexican family", heteronormative relationships, concepts of beauty, through parody of the ridiculousness of their traditional portrayal in popular culture. In her own words, her videos uncover the "half lies" of the collective Mexican imagination.

The Sundance Film Festival, New York's Museum of Modern Art, the Guggenheim Museum, and the touring film series, Mexperimental Cinema, have all been venues for screenings of Cuevas' films. Among her noted works is the 1993 video clip entitled "Corazon Sangrante" which received recognition as a Tatu de Oro (Golden Tattoo) best music video.

In 2011, Cuevas announced that she would no longer be making films of social commentary, but instead was working on a project in Guerrero dedicated to the conservation of sea turtles.

== Awards ==
She has received many awards, including a Certificate of Merit from the Chicago International Film Festival of 1993, the Barbara Aronofsky Latham Memorial Award in 2001 and an award as the Best Experimental Video from the 18th San Antonio Film Festival in 2012.

In 2001, the Museum of Modern Art in New York acquired nine of Cuevas' videos for its permanent collection, which was the first time a Mexican video artist's work had been included in MoMA's collection. A total of twenty-four of her videos are in MoMA's collection.

== Selected videography ==
- Las 3 muertes de Lupe (1983–84)
- Noche de Paz (1989)
- Corazón Sangrante (1993)
- Un Dios para Cordelia (1995)
- Cama (1998)
- Hawai (1999)
- Marca registrada (2001)
- Turistas (2001–2002)
- Planetario (2002)

== Selected exhibitions ==
- 1999 - "Experimental cinema," Guggenheim Museum Bilbao, Spain.
- 2004 - "Ximena Cuevas and the Laboratory of Life," University of California, Berkeley Art Museum and Pacific Film Archive.
- 2014 - "FOCO: Ximena Cuevas," Centro de Cultura Digital, Mexico City.
- 2014 - "Pulso alterado: Intensidades en la colección del MUAC y sus colecciones asociadas," Museo Universitario de Arte Contemporáneo, Mexico City.
- 2016 - "Video: Shedding the Utopian Moment," University of Mary Washington Galleries, Fredericksburg, VA.
- 2017–2018 - "Radical Women: Latin American Art, 1960-1985," Hammer Museum, Los Angeles and Brooklyn Museum, New York.
