= Suzanne Chazin =

American author

- Born: New York City, U.S.
- Education: Northwestern University
- Occupation: Author
- Writing career
- Genre: Mystery fiction
- Website: suzannechazin.com

Suzanne Chazin is an American author best known for the Georgia Skeehan mystery series, published by Putnam, about a New York City female firefighter-turned-fire marshal and for the Jimmy Vega mysteryseries about a homicide detective navigating the world of the undocumented, published by Kensington Books.

== Biography ==
Suzanne Chazin was born in Manhattan, New York and is a 1982 graduate of Northwestern University. Chazin spent 18 years in journalism, writing for publications including Family Circle, The Ladies Home Journal, Money Magazine and The New York Times. She is a former senior editor and writer for Reader's Digest, where she won several national awards.

Her first novel in the Georgia Skeehan series, The Fourth Angel, was released in February 2001, followed by Flashover in 2002, and Fireplay in 2003. Her first novel in the Jimmy Vega series, Land of Careful Shadows, was released in December 2014, followed by A Blossom of Bright Light in 2015, No Witness But the Moon, in 2016, A Place in the Wind in 2017, Voice with No Echo in 2020, and The Fragile Edge in 2021. Her novels received critical praise and have been excerpted in the New York Times. In May 2003, she received the Washington Irving Book Award for both The Fourth Angel and Flashover. In 2016, Land of Careful Shadows was selected among the top five mystery books of the year by the American Library Association's RUSA reading council.

Chazin has taught fiction and non-fiction writing at The New School in Manhattan, New York University, Sarah Lawrence College and The Smithsonian.
