= Alexis de Chaunac =

Mexican-French artist (b. 1991)

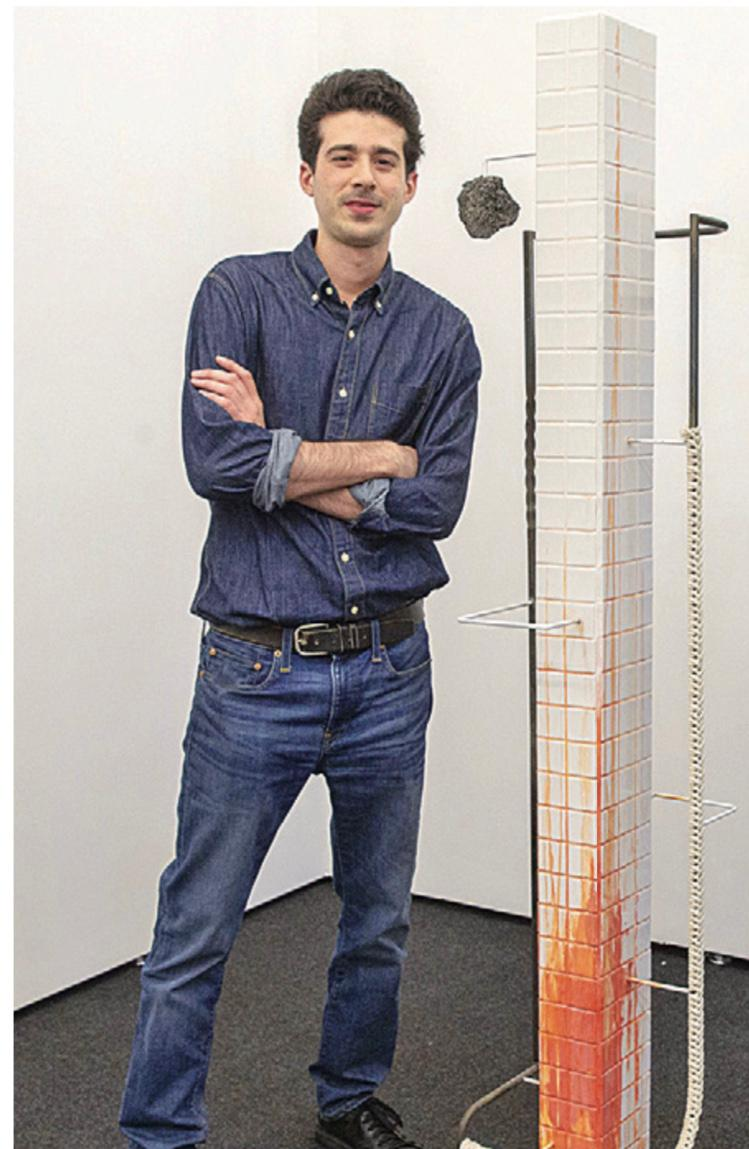
- Born: 1991 (age 34–35)
- Known for: Drawing, Painting

Alexis de Chaunac (born 1991) is a Mexican-French contemporary artist. He is best known for his paintings and drawings, based on mythology, religion, literature, art history and politics.

== Life and career ==
Alexis was born in New York City and grew up in Mexico City and Paris. His grandfather was a Mexican artist José Luis Cuevas, and his father Emmanuel de Chaunac was an executive director and deputy chairman of Christie’s. He graduated from Sarah Lawrence College and the University of Oxford.
