= Judith Rodenbeck =

Judith F. Rodenbeck (b. Nov. 26, 1960) is an American art and cultural historian. She is a professor in the Department of Media and Cultural Studies at the University of California, Riverside, and a former editor-in-chief of Art Journal. Rodenbeck is a leading scholar on Allan Kaprow and a contributor to public discourse on contemporary performance art.

Rodenbeck received a Ph.D. in art history from Columbia University in 2003. She also holds an M.A. in Art History from Columbia, a BFA in Studio for Interrelated Media from the Massachusetts College of Art and Design, and B.A .in the History of Art and English from Yale University. Before joining the faculty at UC Riverside in 2014, she was the Noble Foundation Chair in Art and Cultural History at Sarah Lawrence College.

In addition to serving as the editor of Art Journal from 2007 to 2010, Rodenbeck is a contributor to The Brooklyn Rail and Artforum. She is the co-editor of Experiments in the Everyday: Allan Kaprow and Robert Watts (1999) and author of Radical Prototypes: Allan Kaprow and the Invention of Happenings (2011). Her public speaking engagements have included panels at the Museum of Modern Art, the New Museum, the Institute for Contemporary Art, Los Angeles, and California Museum of Photography.

Rodenbeck has received grants and fellowships from the Andy Warhol Foundation for the Visual Arts and the American Council for Learned Societies.
