= Church of Santa Inés =

Church in Mexico City, Mexico

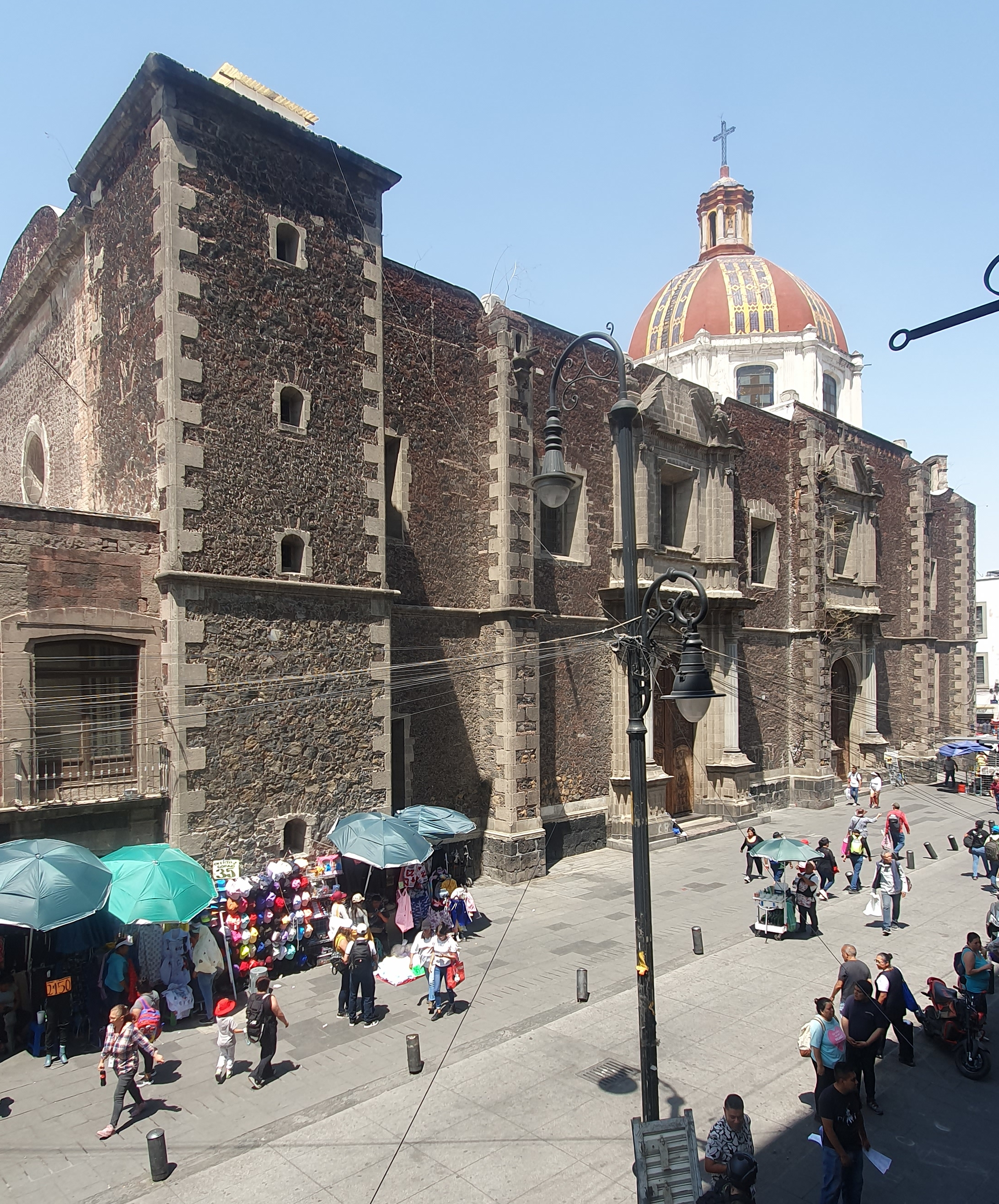
- Exterior, 2024

- Location within Mexico

Location
- Location: Mexico City, Mexico
- Interactive map of Church of Santa Inés
- Coordinates: 19°26′0.3″N 99°7′44.7″W

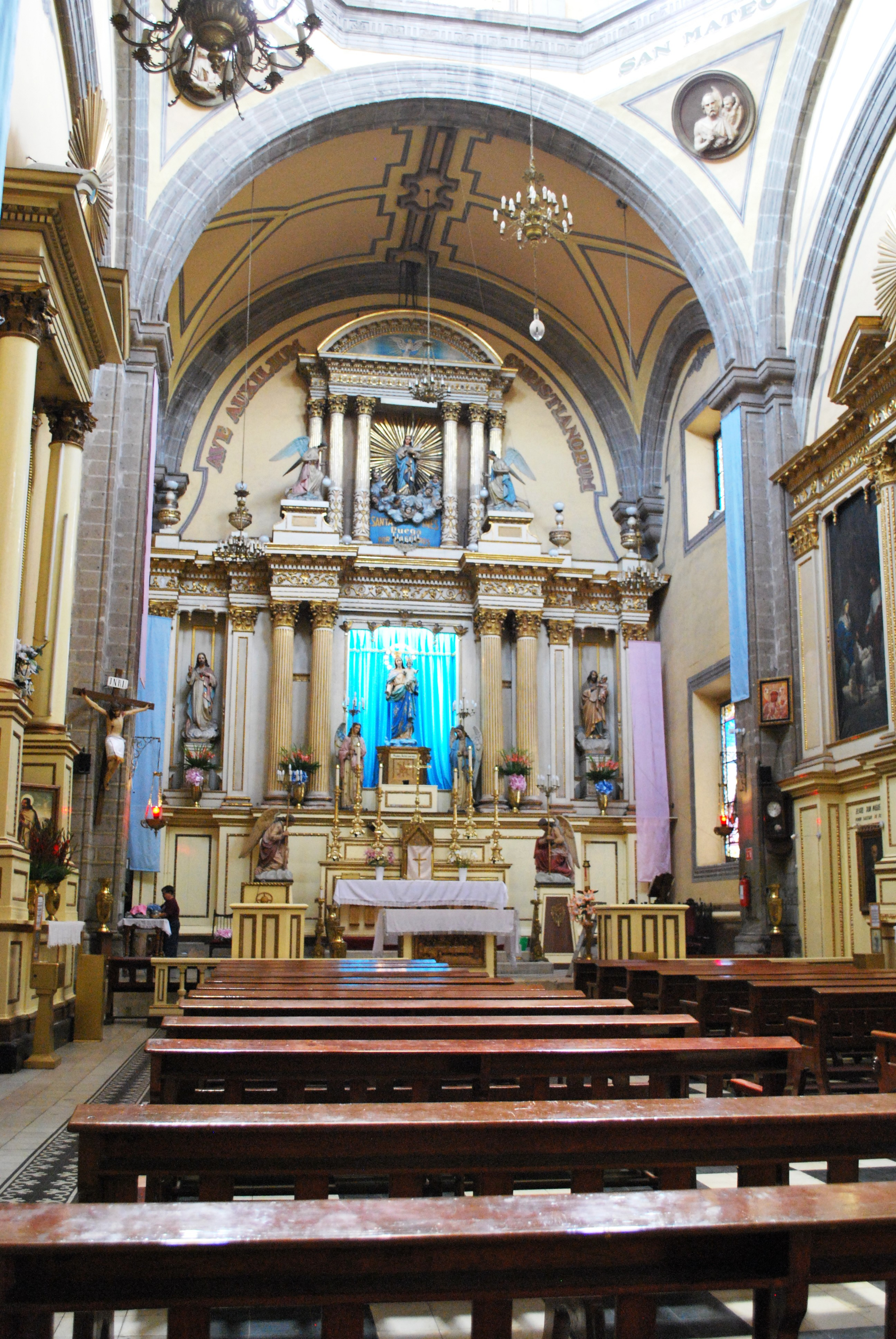
Interior, 2009

The Church of Santa Inés is a church located at 26 Moneda Street, just northeast of the Zócalo, Mexico City, Mexico. The building, formerly part of the Convent of Santa Inés, is considered to be a mix of styles between Mexican Baroque and Neoclassical. The church was completely finished in 1770.

The church has two portals, one dedicated to Saint Agnes and the other to the Apostle James the Great. The wooden doors of this church are carved with reliefs. Some of these depict the life of Saint Agnes and others show images of the nuns of the convent with their benefactors, Don Diego Caballero and Doña Inés de Velasco. One scene depicts the life of the Apostle James just after he is martyred by decapitation. One other shows Santiago Matamoros, a saint connected with the expulsion of the Moors from Spain.

Its dome is decorated with tiles laid in a strip design and made to look like rebozos, a type of indigenous shawl. Inside, the original Baroque altar is long gone, replaced with the current Neoclassic altar. Mexican painters Miguel Cabrera and José de Ibarra are interned in altar here.
