= Charles Bell (disambiguation) =

Charles Bell (1774–1842) was a Scottish anatomist, surgeon, physiologist and natural theologian.

Charles or Charlie Bell may also refer to:

== Arts and entertainment ==
- Charles Bell (British architect) (1846–1899), British architect
- Charles Milton Bell (1848–1893), American photographer
- Charles E. Bell (1858–1932), American architect
- Charles F. Bell (1871–1966), British art curator
- Charlie Bell (clown) (1886–1964), American circus clown
- Charles Bell (painter) (1935–1995), American photorealist painter

== Politics and law ==
- Charles Bell (British politician) (1805–1869), British member of parliament for the City of London
- Charles H. Bell (politician) (1823–1893), American lawyer and politician from New Hampshire
- Charles J. Bell (politician) (1845–1909), American politician; governor of Vermont
- Charles K. Bell (1853–1913), U.S. representative from Texas
- Charles M. Bell (1840–1893), American lawyer and politician from New York
- Charles W. Bell (1857–1927), U.S. representative from California
- Charles Alfred Bell (1870–1945), British political officer in India
- Charles William Bell (1876–1938), Canadian lawyer, member of parliament, and playwright
- Charles S. Bell (1880–1965), American lawyer and judge in Ohio
- C. Jasper Bell (1885–1978), U.S. representative from Missouri

== Sports ==
- Charlie Bell (baseball) (1868–1937), American baseball player
- Charlie Bell (footballer, born 1894) (1894–1939), Scottish footballer and manager
- Lefty Bell (Charles Bell, fl. 1948), American baseball player
- Charlie Bell (footballer, born 1958), English footballer (Middlesbrough FC)
- Charlie Bell (basketball) (born 1979), American basketball player
- Charlie Bell (footballer, born 2002), English footballer

== Others ==
- Charles H. Bell (naval officer) (1798–1875), U.S. Navy officer during the War of 1812 and the First Barbary War
- Charles Davidson Bell (1813–1882), Scottish surveyor general in the Cape Colony, artist and designer of stamps
- Charles J. Bell (businessman) (1858–1929), Irish-American financier and businessman
- Charles Gordon Bell (1889–1918), British pilot in World War I
- Charles Frederic Moberly Bell (1847–1911), British journalist and newspaper editor
- Charles Greenleaf Bell (1916–2010), American scholar, poet and writer
- Charlie Bell (businessman) (1960–2005), Australian businessman; CEO of McDonald's Corporation
