= Capodimonte =

Capodimonte (lit. "head of [the] mountain") is an Italian placename. It may refer to:

- Capodimonte, Naples, an area of Naples which includes:
  - Royal Park of Capodimonte, the major park of Naples which was laid out for Charles III of the House of Bourbon in 1734
  - Palace of Capodimonte, a royal palace
  - Museo di Capodimonte, housed in the former Palace of Capodimonte
  - Astronomical Observatory of Capodimonte
  - Capodimonte porcelain manufactory
- Capodimonte, Viterbo, a town and commune (municipality) on the shores of Lake Bolsena, Province of Viterbo, Lazio
- Capo Di Monte, Hampstead, a Grade II listed house in Hampstead, London
