= Kenneth Clark =

British art historian, museum director, and documentary TV presenter (1903–1983)

The Right Honourable The Lord Clark OM CH KCB FBA
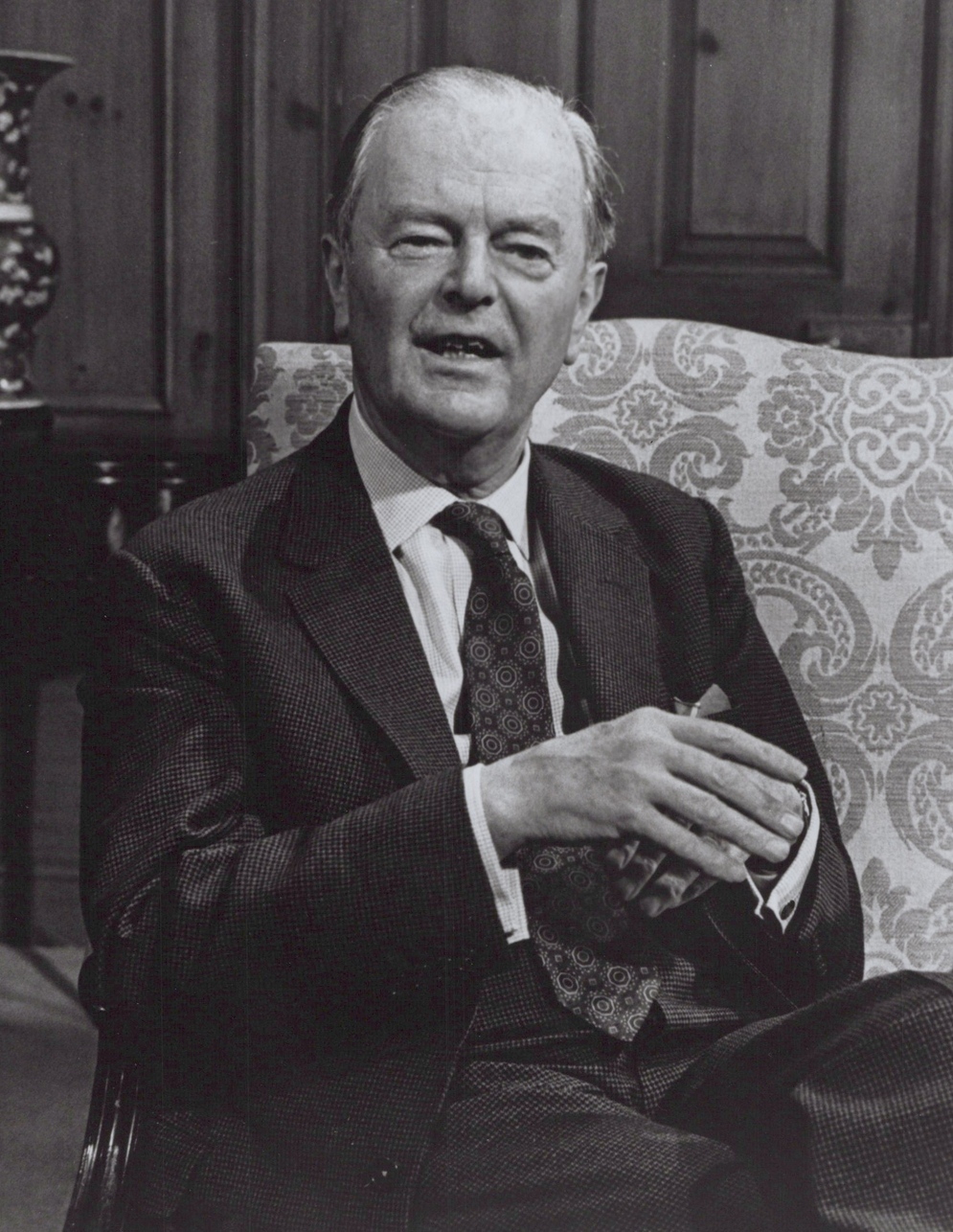
- Clark in 1971
- Born: Kenneth Mackenzie Clark; 13 July 1903; Mayfair, London, England
- Died: 21 May 1983 (aged 79); Hythe, Kent, England
- Education: Winchester College; Trinity College, Oxford
- Occupations: Art historian; Museum director; Broadcaster; Author
- Spouses: Elizabeth Winifred "Jane" Martin (m. 1927; died 1976); Nolwen de Janzé-Rice (m. 1977)
- Children: 3, including Alan and Colin

Kenneth Mackenzie Clark, Baron Clark (13 July 1903 – 21 May 1983) was a British art historian, museum director and broadcaster. His expertise covered a wide range of artists and periods, but he is particularly associated with Italian Renaissance art, most of all that of Leonardo da Vinci. After running two art galleries in the 1930s and 1940s, he came to wider public notice on television, presenting a succession of programmes on the arts from the 1950s to the 1970s, the largest and best known being the Civilisation series in 1969.

The son of rich parents, Clark was introduced to the arts at an early age. Among his early influences were the writings of John Ruskin, which instilled in him the belief that everyone should have access to great art. After coming under the influence of the art experts Bernard Berenson and Roger Fry, Clark was appointed director of the Ashmolean Museum in Oxford aged twenty-seven, and three years later he was put in charge of Britain's National Gallery. His twelve years there saw the gallery transformed to make it accessible and inviting to a wider public. During the Second World War, when the collection was moved from London for safe keeping, Clark made the building available for a series of daily concerts which proved a celebrated morale booster during the Blitz.

After the war, and three years as Slade Professor of Fine Art at Oxford, Clark surprised many by accepting the chairmanship of the UK's first commercial television network. Once the service had been successfully launched he agreed to write and present programmes about the arts. These established him as a household name in Britain, and he was asked to create the first colour series about the arts, Civilisation, first broadcast in 1969 in Britain and in many other countries soon afterwards.

Among many honours, Clark was knighted at the unusually young age of thirty-five, and three decades later was made a life peer shortly before the first transmission of Civilisation. Three decades after his death, Clark was celebrated in an exhibition at Tate Britain in London, prompting a reappraisal of his career by a new generation of critics and historians. Opinions varied about his aesthetic judgement, particularly in attributing paintings to old masters, but his skill as a writer and his enthusiasm for popularising the arts were widely recognised. Both the BBC and the Tate described him in retrospect as one of the most influential figures in British art of the twentieth century.

== Life and career ==
=== Early years ===
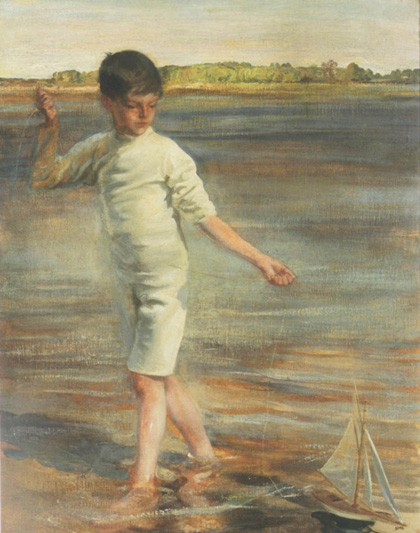
As a boy, 1911

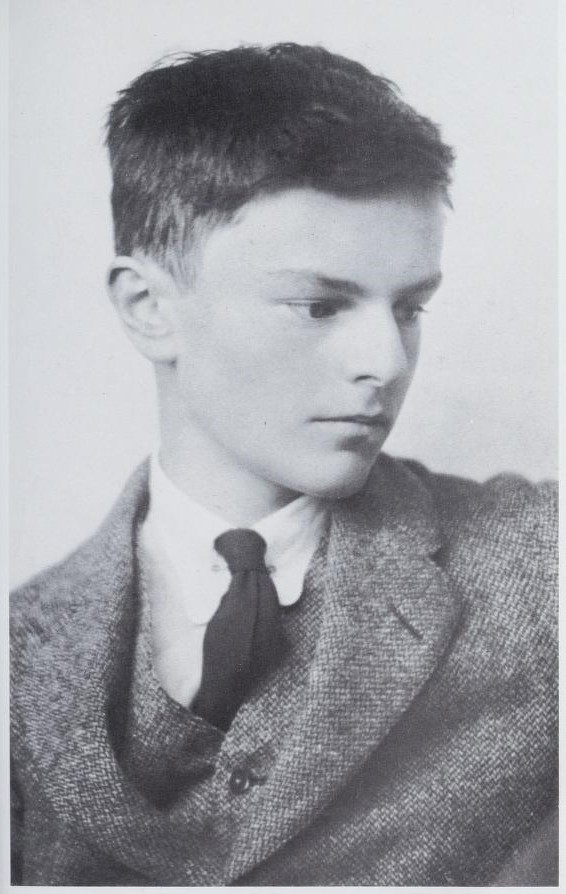
As a teenager, c. 1918

Clark was born at 32 Grosvenor Square, London, (Note: Clark noted in his memoirs that his birthplace later became the site of the American Embassy) the only child of Kenneth Mackenzie Clark and his wife, (Margaret) Alice, daughter of James McArthur of Manchester. The Clarks were a Scottish family who had grown rich in the textile trade. Clark's great-great-grandfather invented the cotton spool, and the Clark Thread Company of Paisley had grown into a substantial business. Kenneth Clark senior worked briefly as a director of the firm and retired in his mid-twenties as a member of the "idle rich", as Clark junior later put it: although "many people were richer, there can have been few who were idler". The Clarks maintained country homes at Sudbourne Hall, Suffolk, and at Ardnamurchan, Argyll, and wintered on the French Riviera. Kenneth senior was a sportsman, a gambler, (Note: Clark senior is thought by some to have been the inspiration for the popular song "The Man Who Broke the Bank at Monte Carlo".) an eccentric and a heavy drinker. Clark had little in common with his father, though he always remained fond of him. Alice Clark was shy and distant, but her son received affection from a devoted nanny.

As an only child not especially close to his parents, the young Clark had a boyhood that was often solitary, but he was generally happy. He later recalled that he used to take long walks, talking to himself, a habit he believed stood him in good stead as a broadcaster: "Television is a form of soliloquy". On a modest scale Clark senior collected pictures, and the young Kenneth was allowed to rearrange the collection. He developed a competent talent for drawing, for which he later won several prizes as a schoolboy. When he was seven he was taken to an exhibition of Japanese art in London, which was a formative influence on his artistic tastes; he recalled, "dumb with delight, I felt that I had entered a new world".

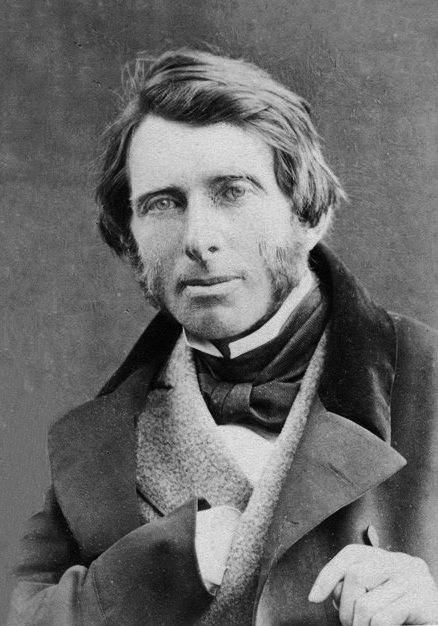
John Ruskin, whose writings inspired the young Clark

Clark was educated at Wixenford School and, from 1917 to 1922, Winchester College. The latter was known for its intellectual rigour and – to Clark's dismay – enthusiasm for sports, but it also encouraged its pupils to develop interests in the arts. The headmaster, Montague Rendall, was a devotee of Italian painting and sculpture; he inspired Clark, among many others, to appreciate the works of Giotto, Botticelli, Bellini and their compatriots. The school library contained the collected writings of John Ruskin, which Clark read avidly, and which influenced him for the rest of his life, not only in their artistic judgments but in their progressive political and social beliefs. (Note: Clark's biographer James Stourton writes, "His debt to Ruskin can never be sufficiently emphasised, and it informed many of his interests: the Gothic Revival, J. M. W. Turner, socialism, and the belief that art criticism can be a branch of literature. But above all, Ruskin taught Clark that art and beauty are everyone's birthright – and he took that message into the twentieth century.")

From Winchester, Clark won a scholarship to Trinity College, Oxford, where he studied modern history. He graduated in 1925 with a second-class honours degree. In the Oxford Dictionary of National Biography, Sir David Piper comments that Clark had been expected to gain a first-class degree, but had not applied himself single-mindedly to his historical studies: "his interests had already turned conclusively to the study of art".

While at Oxford, Clark was greatly impressed by the lectures of Roger Fry, the influential art critic who staged the first Post-Impressionism exhibitions in Britain. Under Fry's influence he developed an understanding of modern French painting, particularly the work of Paul Cézanne. Clark attracted the attention of Charles F. Bell, Keeper of the Fine Art Department of the Ashmolean Museum. Bell became a mentor to him and suggested that for his B Litt thesis Clark should write about the Gothic revival in architecture. At that time it was a deeply unfashionable subject; no serious study had been published since the nineteenth century. Although Clark's main area of study was the Renaissance, his admiration for Ruskin, the most prominent defender of the neo-Gothic style, drew him to the topic. He did not complete the thesis, but later turned his researches into his first full-length book, The Gothic Revival (1928). In 1925, Bell introduced Clark to Bernard Berenson, an influential scholar of the Italian Renaissance and consultant to major museums and collectors. Berenson was working on a revision of his book Drawings of the Florentine Painters, and invited Clark to help. The project took two years, overlapping with Clark's studies at Oxford.

=== Early career ===
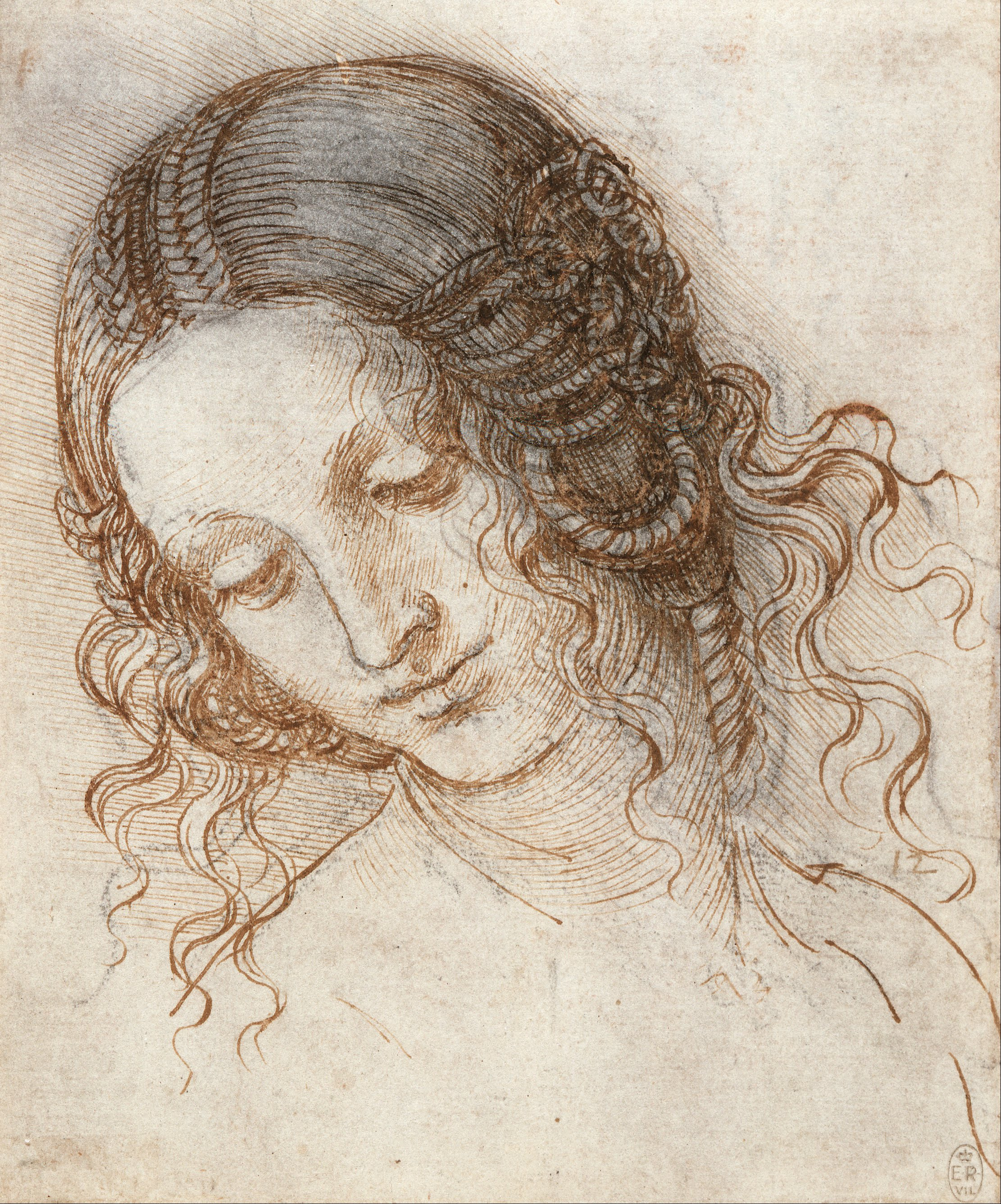
Leonardo da Vinci: Head of Leda, in the Royal Collection

In 1929, as a result of his work with Berenson, Clark was asked to catalogue the extensive collection of Leonardo da Vinci drawings at Windsor Castle. That year he was the joint organiser of an exhibition of Italian painting which opened at the Royal Academy on 1 January 1930. He and his co-organiser Lord Balniel secured masterpieces never seen before outside Italy, many of them from private collections. The exhibition covered Italian art "from Cimabue to Segantini" – from the mid-thirteenth to the late-nineteenth century. It was greeted with public and critical acclaim, and raised Clark's profile, but he came to regret the propaganda value derived from the exhibition by the Italian dictator Benito Mussolini who had been instrumental in making so many sought-after paintings available. Several senior figures in the British art world disapproved of the exhibition; Bell was among them, but nevertheless he continued to regard Clark as his favoured successor at the Ashmolean.

Clark was not convinced that his future lay in administration; he enjoyed writing, and would have preferred to be a scholar rather than a museum director. Nonetheless, when Bell retired in 1931 Clark agreed to succeed him as Keeper of the Fine Art Department at the Ashmolean. Over the next two years Clark oversaw the building of an extension to the museum to provide a better space for his department. The development was made possible by an anonymous benefactor, subsequently revealed as Clark himself. His acquisitions while at the Ashmolean included a large piece of mid-19th-century furniture known as the Great Bookcase. Victorian art and architecture were out of fashion in the 1930s, "generally despised and derided", according to the art historian Matthew Winterbottom, (Note: Clark's Oxford contemporary, Osbert Lancaster, quoted with approval P. G. Wodehouse's 1937 dictum, "Whatever may be said in favour of the Victorians, it is pretty generally admitted that few of them were to be trusted within reach of a trowel and a pile of bricks".) but Clark believed that they should be represented in the collection, although the bookcase was not put on display until 2016. A later curator of the museum wrote that Clark would be remembered for his time there, "when, with his characteristic mixture of arrogance and energy, he transformed both the collections and their display."

=== National Gallery ===
In 1933 the director of the National Gallery in London, Sir Augustus Daniel, was aged sixty-seven, and due to retire at the end of the year. His assistant director, W. G. Constable, who had been in line to succeed him, had moved to the new Courtauld Institute of Art as its director in 1932. The historian Peter Stansky writes that behind the scenes the National Gallery "was in considerable turmoil; the staff and the trustees were in a state of continual warfare with each other." The chairman of the trustees, Lord Lee, convinced the prime minister, Ramsay MacDonald, that Clark would be the best appointment, acceptable to the professional staff and the trustees, and able to restore harmony. When he received MacDonald's offer of the post, Clark was not enthusiastic. He thought himself too young, aged 30, and once again felt torn between a scholarly and an administrative career. He accepted the directorship in January 1934, although, as he wrote to Berenson, "in between being the manager of a large department store I shall have to be a professional entertainer to the landed and official classes".

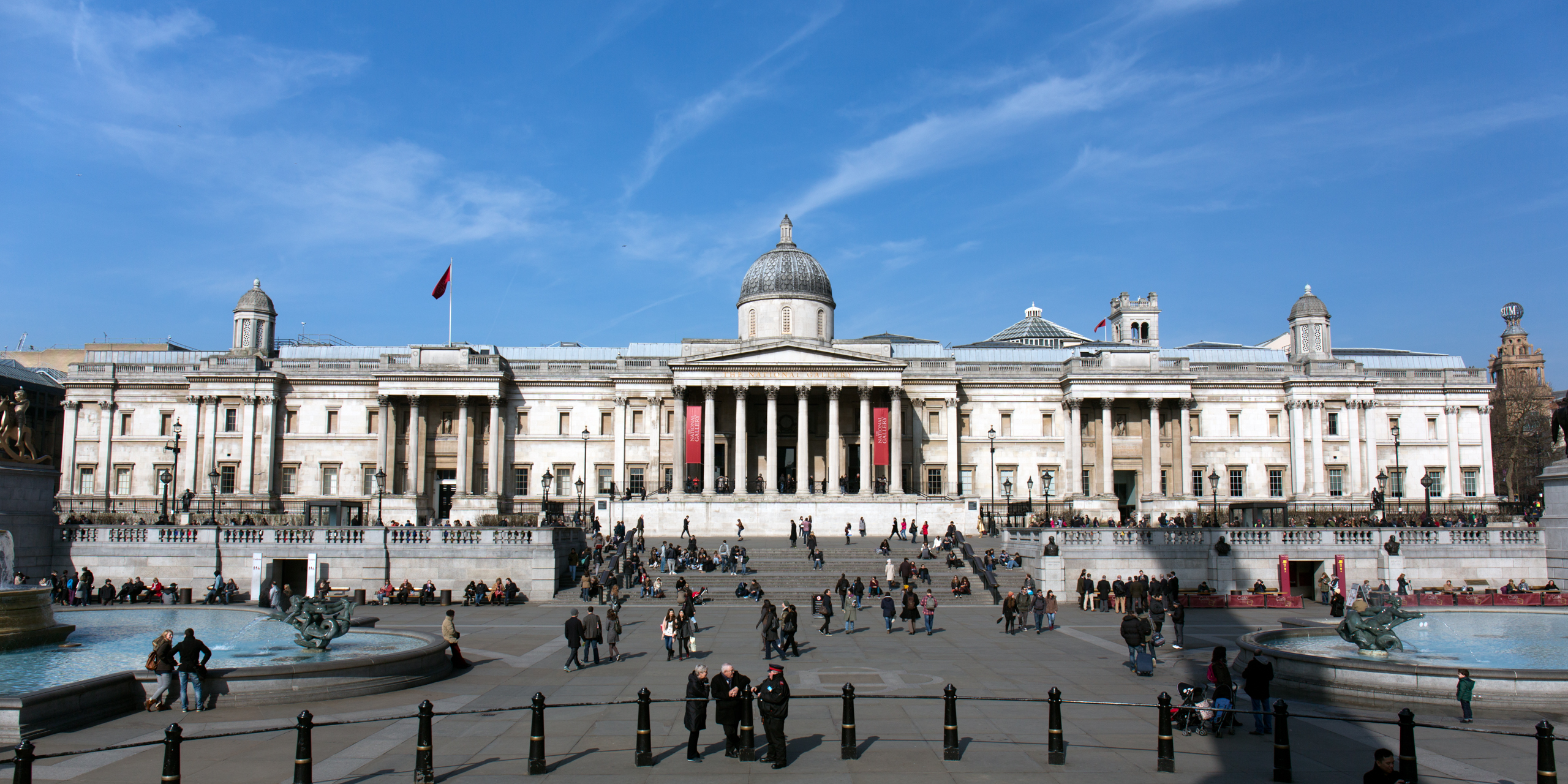
The National Gallery, Trafalgar Square, London

At about the same time as accepting MacDonald's offer of the directorship, Clark had declined one from King George V's officials to succeed C. H. Collins Baker as Surveyor of the King's Pictures. He felt that he could not do justice to the post in tandem with his new duties at the gallery. (Note: At the National Gallery, Clark was responsible for a collection of about 2,000 paintings: the royal collection numbered 7,000.) The King, determined to succeed where his staff had failed, went with Queen Mary to the National Gallery and persuaded Clark to change his mind. The appointment was announced in The London Gazette in July 1934; Clark held the post for the next ten years.

Clark believed in making fine art accessible to everyone, and while at the National Gallery he devised many initiatives with this aim in mind. In an editorial, The Burlington Magazine said, "Clark put all his insight and imagination into making the National Gallery a more sympathetic place in which the visitor could enjoy a great collection of European paintings". He had rooms re-hung and frames improved; by 1935 he had achieved the installation of a laboratory and introduced electric lighting, which made evening opening possible for the first time. A programme of cleaning was begun, despite sporadic sniping from those opposed in principle to cleaning old pictures; experimentally, the glass was removed from some pictures. (Note: In their letter of congratulation on his appointment as director, Vanessa Bell and Duncan Grant had expressed the hope that he would remove the glass from every picture in the gallery.) In several years he had the gallery opened two hours earlier than usual on the day of the FA Cup Final, for the benefit of people coming to London for the match.

Clark wrote and lectured during the decade. The annotated catalogue of the royal collection of Leonardo da Vinci's drawings, on which he had begun work in 1929, was published in 1935, to highly favourable reviews; eighty years later Oxford Art Online called it "a work of firm scholarship, the conclusions of which have stood the test of time". Another 1935 publication by Clark offended some in the avant-garde: an essay, published in The Listener, "The Future of Painting", in which he rebuked surrealists on the one hand and abstract artists on the other for claiming to represent the future of art. He judged both as too elitist and too specialised – "the end of a period of self-consciousness, inbreeding and exhaustion". He maintained that good art must be accessible to everyone and must be rooted in the observable world. During the 1930s Clark was in demand as a lecturer, and he frequently used his research for his talks as the basis of his books. In 1936 he gave the Ryerson Lectures at Yale University. From these came his study of Leonardo, published three years later; it too, attracted much praise, at the time and subsequently.

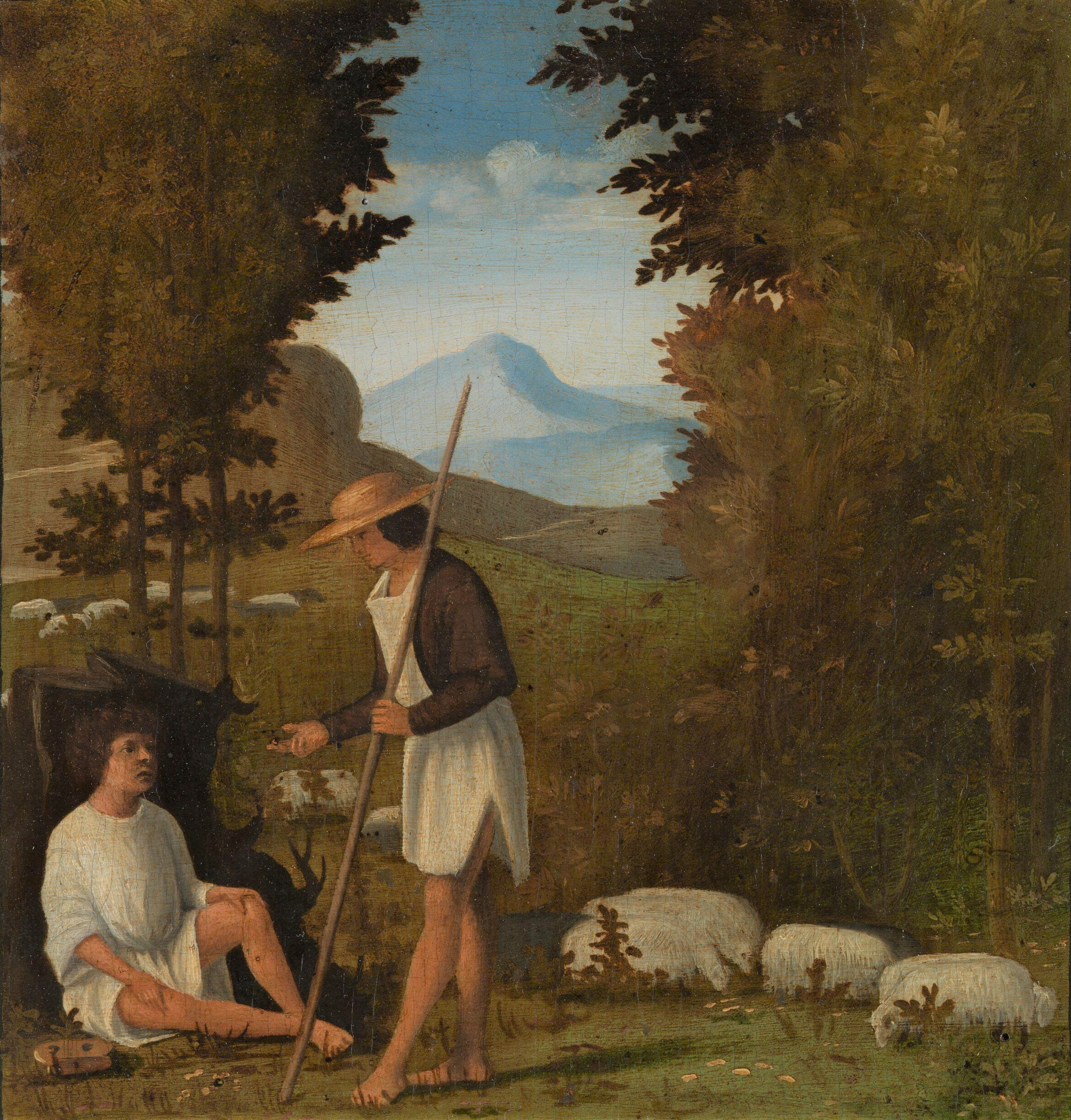
One of four paintings by Andrea Previtali which Clark attributed to Giorgione in 1937

The Burlington Magazine, looking back at Clark's time at the gallery, singled out among the works acquired under his leadership the seven panels forming Sassetta's San Sepolcro Altarpiece from the fifteenth century, four works by Giovanni di Paolo from the same period, Niccolò dell'Abate's The Death of Eurydice from the sixteenth century and Ingres' Madame Moitessier from the nineteenth. Other important acquisitions, listed by Piper, were Rubens' Watering Place, Constable's Hadleigh Castle, Rembrandt's Saskia as Flora, and Poussin's The Adoration of the Golden Calf.

One of Clark's least successful acts as director was buying four early-sixteenth century paintings now known as Scenes from Tebaldeo's Eclogues. He saw them in 1937 in the possession of a dealer in Vienna, and against the united advice of his professional staff he persuaded the trustees to buy them. He believed them to be by Giorgione, whose work he considered inadequately represented in the gallery at the time. (Note: There are only a handful of attested paintings by Giorgione anywhere in the world. The National Gallery in 2025 has two: The Adoration of the Kings, bought in 1884, and Il Tramonto (The Sunset), bought in 1961.) The trustees authorised the expenditure of £14,000 of public funds and the paintings went on display in the gallery with considerable fanfare. His staff did not accept the attribution to Giorgione, and within a year scholarly research established the paintings as the work of Andrea Previtali, one of Giorgione's minor contemporaries. The British press protested at the waste of taxpayers' money, Clark's reputation suffered a considerable blow, and his relations with his professional team, already uneasy, were further strained. (Note: Relations between Clark and his subordinates had been tense for some years: two of his senior officials, Harold Kay and Martin Davies, felt their autonomy undermined by what they saw as Clark's dictatorial management style.)

==== Wartime ====
The approach of war with Germany in 1939 obliged Clark and his colleagues to consider how to protect the National Gallery's collection from bombing raids. It was agreed that all the works of art must be moved out of central London, where they were acutely vulnerable. One suggestion was to send them to Canada for safekeeping, but by this time the war had started and Clark was worried about the possibility of submarine attacks on the ships taking the collection across the Atlantic; he was not displeased when the prime minister, Winston Churchill, vetoed the idea: "Hide them in caves and cellars, but not one picture shall leave this island." A disused slate mine near Blaenau Ffestiniog in north Wales was chosen as the store. To protect the paintings special storage compartments were constructed, and from careful monitoring of the collection discoveries were made about control of temperature and humidity that benefited its care and display when back in London after the war.

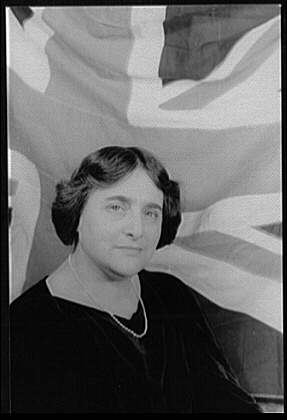
Myra Hess, inspiration and mainstay of the National Gallery's wartime concerts

With an empty gallery to preside over, Clark contemplated volunteering for the Royal Naval Volunteer Reserve, but was recruited, at Lord Lee's instigation, into the newly formed Ministry of Information, where he was put in charge of the film division, and was later promoted to be controller of home publicity. He set up the War Artists' Advisory Committee, and persuaded the government to employ official war artists in considerable numbers. There were up to two hundred engaged under Clark's initiative. Those designated "official war artists" included Edward Ardizzone, Paul and John Nash, Mervyn Peake, John Piper and Graham Sutherland. Artists employed on short-term contracts included Jacob Epstein, Laura Knight, L. S. Lowry, Henry Moore and Stanley Spencer.

Although the pictures were in storage, Clark kept the National Gallery open to the public during the war, hosting a celebrated series of lunchtime and early evening concerts. They were the inspiration of the pianist Myra Hess, whose idea Clark greeted with delight, as a suitable way for the building to be "used again for its true purposes, the enjoyment of beauty." There was no advance booking, and audience members were free to eat their sandwiches and walk in or out during breaks in the performance. The concerts were an immediate and enormous success. The Musical Times commented, "Countless Londoners and visitors to London, civilian and service alike, came to look on the concerts as a haven of sanity in a distraught world." 1,698 concerts were given to an aggregate audience of more than 750,000 people. Clark instituted an additional public attraction of a monthly featured picture brought from storage and exhibited along with explanatory material. The institution of a "picture of the month" was retained after the war, and, at 2025, has continued to the present day.

In 1945, after overseeing the return of the collections to the National Gallery, Clark resigned as director, intending to devote himself to writing. During the war years he had published little. For the gallery he wrote a slim volume about Constable's The Hay Wain (1944); from a lecture he gave in 1944 he published a short treatise on Leon Battista Alberti's On Painting (1944). The following year he contributed an introduction and notes to a volume on Florentine paintings in a series of art books published by Faber and Faber. The three publications totalled fewer than eighty pages between them.

=== Postwar ===
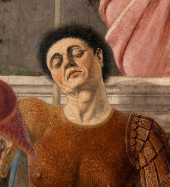
Detail from The Resurrection by Piero della Francesca, subject of Clark's 1951 study

In July 1946 Clark was appointed Slade Professor of Fine Art at Oxford for a three-year term. The post required him to give eight public lectures each year on the "History, Theory, and Practice of the Fine Arts". The first holder of the professorship had been Ruskin; Clark took as his first subject Ruskin's tenure of the post. James Stourton, Clark's authorised biographer, judges the appointment to be the most rewarding his subject ever held, and notes how, during this period, Clark established himself as Britain's most sought-after lecturer, and wrote two of his finest books, Landscape into Art (1947) and Piero della Francesca (1951). (Note: In 1961, by when the appointment was for an annual term, Clark was again Slade Professor at Oxford.) By this time Clark no longer hankered after a career in pure scholarship, but saw his role as sharing his knowledge and experience with the wide public.

Clark served on numerous official committees during this period, (Note: Stourton lists the British Committee on the Preservation and Restitution of Works of Art; the governing council of the Bath Institute of Art; the governing body of the Courtauld; the Council of the Festival of Britain; and the Royal Fine Art Commission.) and helped to stage a ground-breaking exhibition in Paris of works by his friend and protégé Henry Moore. He was more in sympathy with modern painting and sculpture than with much of modern architecture. He admired Giles Gilbert Scott, Maxwell Fry, Frank Lloyd Wright, Alvar Aalto and others, but found many contemporary buildings mediocre. Clark had been among the first to conclude that private patronage could no longer support the arts; during the war he had been a prominent member of the state-funded Council for the Encouragement of Music and the Arts. When it was reconstituted as the Arts Council of Great Britain in 1945 he was invited to serve as a member of its executive committee, and as chairman of the council's arts panel.

In 1953 Clark became the Arts Council's chairman. He held the post until 1960, but it was a frustrating experience for him; he found himself chiefly a figurehead. Moreover, he was concerned that the way the council went about funding the arts was in danger of damaging the individualism of the artists whom it supported.

=== Broadcasting: administrator, 1954–1957 ===
The year after becoming chairman of the Arts Council, Clark surprised many and shocked some by accepting the chairmanship of the new Independent Television Authority (ITA). It had been set up by the Conservative government to introduce ITV, commercial television, funded by advertising, as a rival to the British Broadcasting Corporation. Many of those opposed to the new broadcaster feared vulgarisation on the lines of American television, and although Clark's appointment reassured some, others thought his acceptance of the post a betrayal of artistic and intellectual standards. (Note: Clark recalled being booed at his London club, the Athenaeum, after the appointment was announced, although some doubt has been cast on the reliability of his memory on this point.)

Clark was no stranger to broadcasting. He had appeared on air frequently from 1936, when he gave a radio talk on an exhibition of Chinese Art at Burlington House; the following year he made his television debut, presenting Florentine paintings from the National Gallery. During the war he appeared regularly on BBC radio's The Brains Trust. While presiding over the new ITA he generally kept off the air, and concentrated on keeping the new network going during its difficult early years. By the end of his three-year term as chairman, Clark was hailed as a success, but privately considered that there were too few high-quality programmes on the network. Lew Grade, who as chairman of Associated Television (ATV) held one of the ITV franchises, felt strongly that Clark should make arts programmes of his own, and as soon as Clark stood down as chairman in 1957, he accepted Grade's invitation. Stourton comments, "this was the true beginning of arguably his most successful career – as a presenter of the arts on television".

=== Broadcasting: ITV, 1957–1966 ===
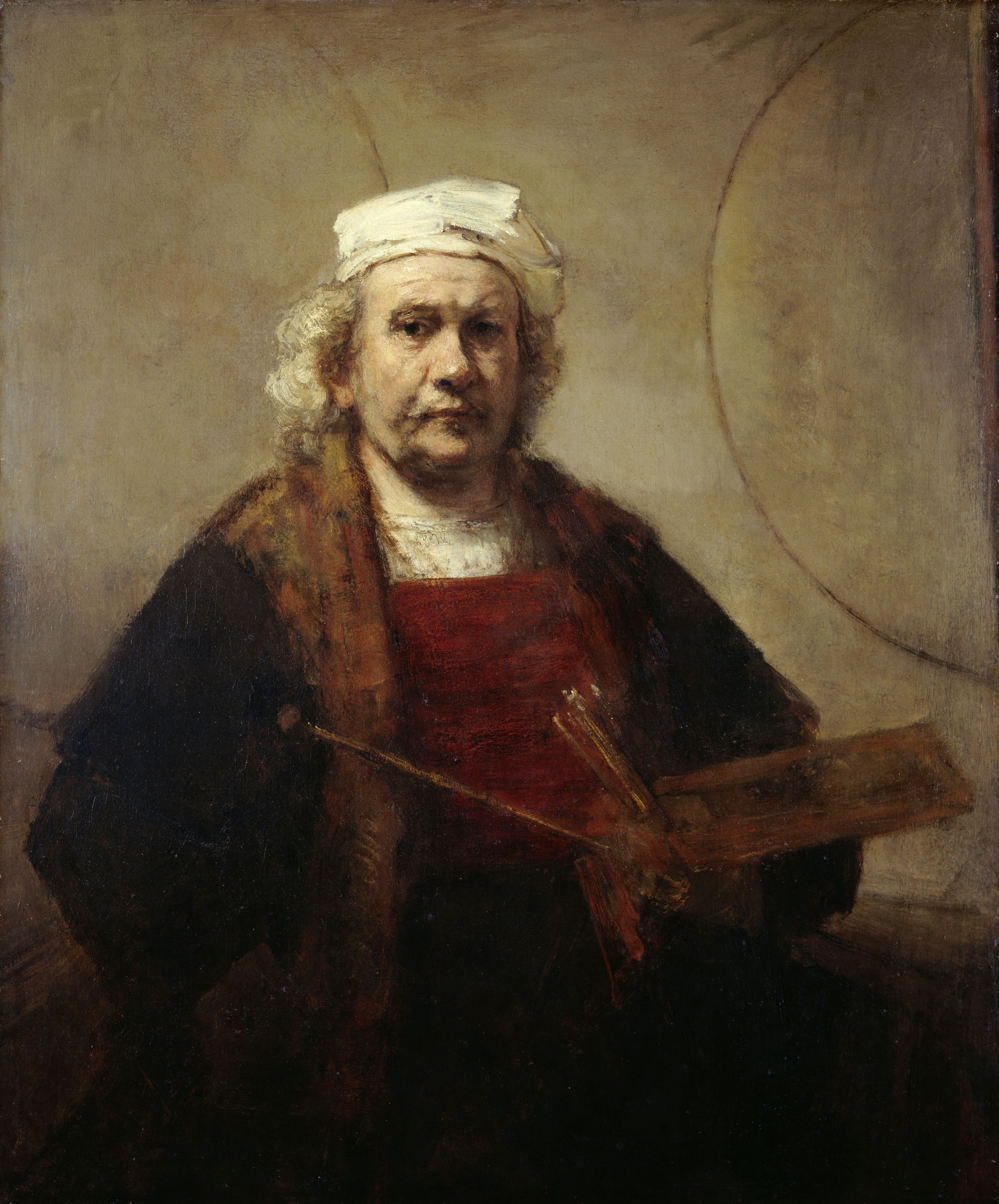
Rembrandt, the last of Clark's Five Revolutionary Painters series (1960)

Clark's first series for ATV, Is Art Necessary?, began in 1958. Both he and television were finding their way, and programmes in the series ranged from the stiff and studio-bound to a film in which Clark and Henry Moore toured the British Museum at night, flashing their torches at the exhibits. When the series came to an end in 1959, Clark and the production team reviewed and refined their techniques for the next series, Five Revolutionary Painters, which attracted a considerable audience. The British Film Institute observes:

With the television camera strolling among the paintings (by Goya, Breughel, Caravaggio, Van Gogh and Rembrandt) and the urbane, confident Clark conveying his tremendous knowledge in exceptionally clear English, the viewer was treated to the essence of what the painter saw in his creation (not an easy task in the era of black and white television).

By the time in 1960 when he presented a programme about Picasso, Clark had further honed his presentational skills and came across as relaxed as well as authoritative. Two series on architecture followed, culminating in a programme called The Royal Palaces of Britain in 1966, a joint venture by ITV and the BBC, described as "by far the most important heritage programme shown on British television to date". The Guardian described Clark as "the ideal man for the job – scholarly, courtly and gently ironical". The Royal Palaces, unlike its predecessors, was shot on 35mm colour film, but transmission was still in black and white, at which Clark chafed. The BBC was by this time planning to broadcast in colour, and his renewed contact with the corporation for this film paved the way for his eventual return to its schedules. In the interim he remained with ITV for a 1966 series, Three Faces of France, featuring the works of Courbet, Manet and Degas.

=== Civilisation, 1966–1969 ===
I had no clear idea what "civilisation" meant, but thought it was preferable to barbarism, and fancied that this was the moment to say so.

— Clark on the genesis of Civilisation

David Attenborough, the controller of the BBC's new second television channel, BBC2, was in charge of introducing colour broadcasting to the UK. He conceived the idea of a series about great paintings as the standard-bearer for colour television, and had no doubt that Clark would be much the best presenter for it. Clark was attracted by the suggestion, but at first declined to commit himself. He later recalled that what convinced him that he should take part was Attenborough's use of the word "civilisation" to sum up what the series would be about.

The series consisted of thirteen programmes, each fifty minutes long, written and presented by Clark, covering western European civilisation from the end of the Dark Ages to the early twentieth century. As the civilisation under consideration excluded Graeco-Roman, Asian and other historically important cultures, a title was chosen that disclaimed comprehensiveness: Civilisation: A Personal View by Kenneth Clark. (Note: In the book derived from the series Clark wrote, "I didn't suppose that anyone would be so obtuse as to think that I had forgotten about the great civilisations of the pre-Christian era and the East. However, I confess the title has worried me. It would have been easy in the eighteenth century: Speculations on the Nature of Civilisation as illustrated by the Phases of Civilised Life in Western Europe from the Dark Ages to Present Day. Unfortunately, this is no longer practicable.") Although it focused chiefly on the visual arts and architecture, there were substantial sections about drama, literature, philosophy and socio-political movements. Clark wanted to include more about law and philosophy, but "I could not think of any way of making them visually interesting."

After initial mutual antipathy, Clark and his principal director, Michael Gill, established a congenial working relationship. They and their production team spent three years from 1966 filming in a hundred and seventeen locations in thirteen countries. The filming was to the highest technical standards of the day, and quickly went over budget; it cost £500,000 by the time it was complete. Attenborough rejigged his broadcasting schedules to spread the cost by transmitting each episode twice in a week.

Scholars and academics had their understandable quibbles, but for the general public the series was something like a revelation. Art-museum exhibits in both England and the U.S. reported a surge of visitors following each episode.

— The New Yorker on Civilisation

There were complaints, then and later, that by focusing on a traditional choice of the great artists over the centuries – all of them male – Clark had neglected women and presented "a saga of noble names and sublime objects with little regard for the shaping forces of economics or practical politics". His modus operandi was dubbed "the great man approach", and he described himself on screen as a hero-worshipper and a stick-in-the-mud. He commented that his outlook was "nothing striking, nothing original, nothing that could not have been written by an ordinary harmless bourgeois of the later nineteenth century":

I hold a number of beliefs that have been repudiated by the liveliest intellects of our time. I believe that order is better than chaos, creation better than destruction. I prefer gentleness to violence, forgiveness to vendetta. On the whole I think that knowledge is preferable to ignorance, and I am sure that human sympathy is more valuable than ideology.

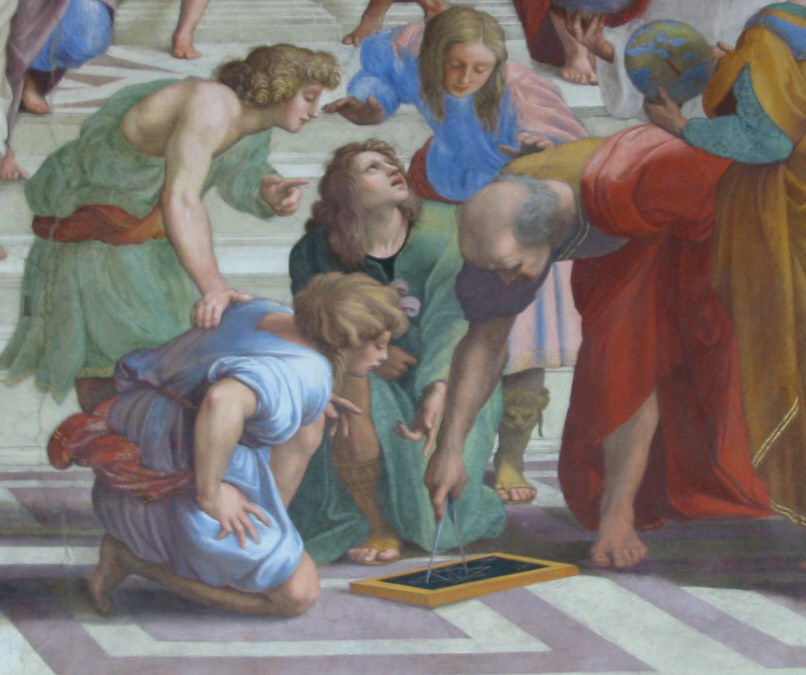
Detail from Raphael's The School of Athens, reproduced on the cover of the book and DVD versions of Civilisation

The broadcaster Huw Wheldon believed that Civilisation was "a truly great series, a major work ... the first magnum opus attempted and realised in terms of TV." There was a widespread view among critics, including some unsympathetic to Clark's selections, that the filming set new standards. (Note: The series was described as "visually stunning" by critics on both sides of the Atlantic, including Paul B. Harvey in the US and Mary Beard in Britain. In 2011 Jonathan Jones wrote in The Guardian of Civilisation's "sheer visual beauty ... the camerawork and direction ... rise to the poetry of cinema".) Civilisation attracted unprecedented viewing figures for a high art series: 2.5 million viewers in Britain and 5 million in the US. Clark's accompanying book has never been out of print, and the BBC continued to sell thousands of copies of the DVD set of Civilisation every year. In 2016, The New Yorker echoed the words of John Betjeman, describing Clark as "the man who made the best telly you've ever seen".

The British Film Institute notes how Civilisation changed the shape of cultural television, setting the standard for later documentary series, from Alastair Cooke's America (1972) and Jacob Bronowski's The Ascent of Man (1973) to the present day.

=== Later years: 1970–1983 ===
Clark made a series of six programmes for ITV. They were collectively titled Pioneers of Modern Painting, directed by his son Colin. They were screened in November and December 1971, with a programme on each of Manet, Cezanne, Monet, Seurat, Rousseau and Munch. Although they were shown on commercial television, there were no advertising breaks during each programme. With the aid of a grant from the National Endowment for the Humanities, the National Gallery of Art in Washington DC acquired copies of the series and distributed them to colleges and universities throughout the US. In 1973 he made Romantic Art Versus Classic Art for ITV.

In 1976 Clark returned to the BBC, presenting five programmes about Rembrandt. The series, directed by Colin Clark, considered various aspects of the painter's work, from his self-portraits to his biblical scenes. The National Gallery observes about this series, "These art history lectures are an authoritative study of Rembrandt and feature examples of his work from over fifty museums".

Clark was chancellor of the University of York from 1967 to 1978 and a trustee of the British Museum. During his last ten years he wrote thirteen books. As well as some drawn from his researches for his lectures and television series, there were two volumes of memoirs, Another Part of the Wood (1974) and The Other Half (1977). He was known throughout his life for his impenetrable façade and enigmatic character, which were reflected in the two autobiographical books: Piper describes them as "elegantly and subtly polished, at times very moving, often very funny [but] somewhat distanced, as if about someone else."

In his last years Clark suffered from arteriosclerosis. He died on 21 May 1983 at the age of seventy-nine, in a nursing home in Hythe, Kent, after a fall.

== Family and personal life ==
In 1927 Clark married a fellow student, Elizabeth Winifred Martin, known as "Jane" (1902–1976), the daughter of Robert Macgregor Martin, a Dublin businessman, and his wife, Emily Winifred Dickson. The couple had three children: Alan, in 1928, and twins, Colette (known as Celly, pronounced "Kelly") and Colin, in 1932.

Away from his official duties, Clark enjoyed what he described as "the Great Clark Boom" in the 1930s. He and his wife lived and entertained in considerable style in a large house in Portland Place. In Piper's words, "the Clarks in joint alliance became stars of London high society, intelligentsia, and fashion, from Mayfair to Windsor".

The Clarks' marriage was devoted but stormy. Clark was a womaniser, and although Jane had love affairs, notably with the composer William Walton, she took some of her husband's extramarital relationships badly. She suffered severe mood swings and later alcoholism and a stroke. Clark remained firmly supportive of his wife during her decline. The Clarks' relations with their three children were sometimes difficult, particularly with their elder son, Alan. He was regarded by his father as a fascist by conviction though also as the ablest member of the Clark family "parents included"; he became a Conservative member of parliament and junior minister, and a celebrated diarist. The younger son, Colin, became a film-maker, who among other work directed his father in television series in the 1970s. The twin daughter, Colette, became an official and board member of the Royal Opera House; she outlived her parents and brothers, and was the key source for James Stourton's authorised biography of her father, published in 2016.

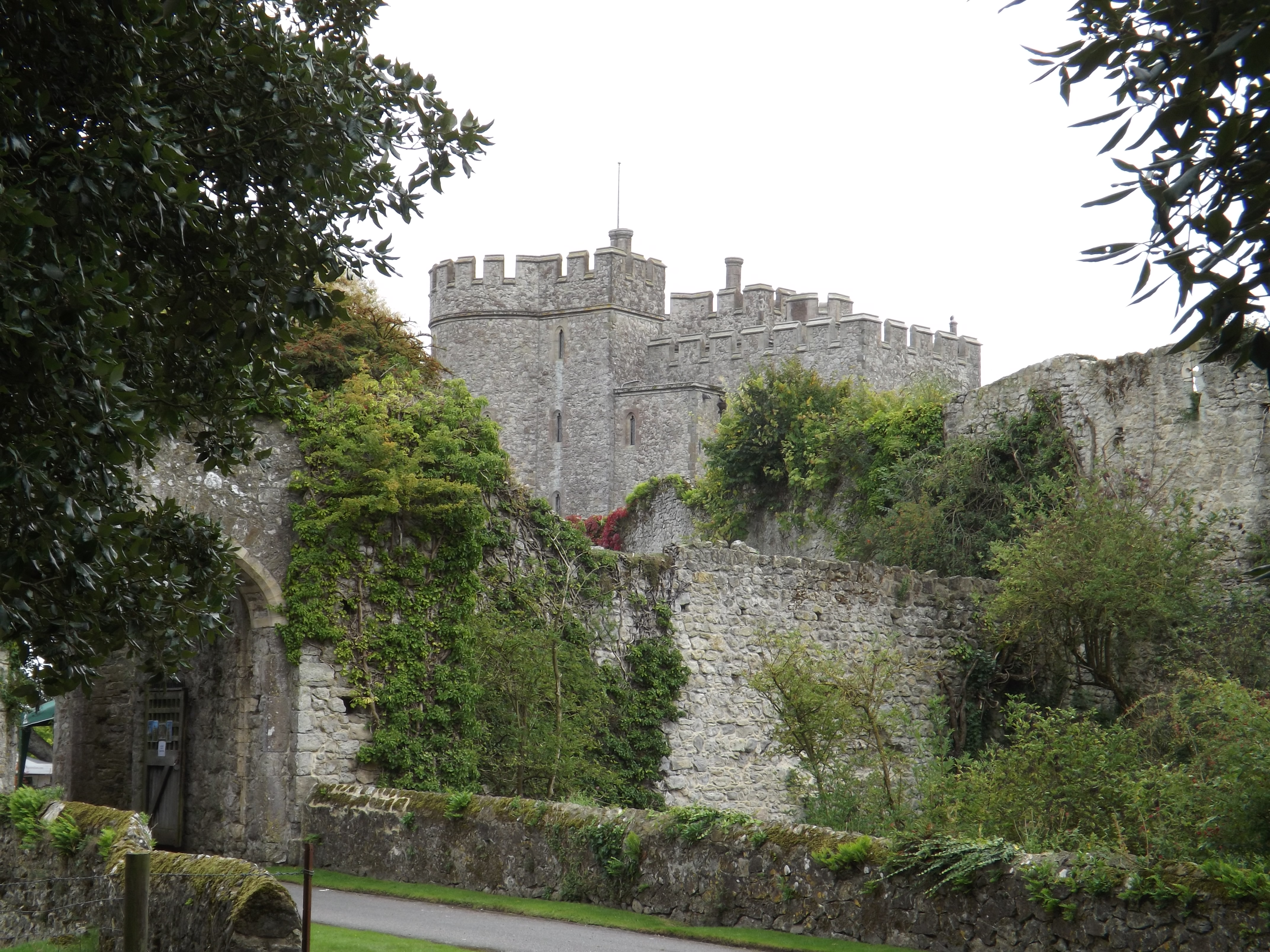
Saltwood Castle, Kent, bought by Clark in 1953

During the Second World War the Clarks lived at Capo Di Monte, a "cottage" in Hampstead, or rather "three cottages knocked into one", before moving to the much larger Upper Terrace House nearby. They moved in 1953 when Clark bought the Norman Saltwood Castle in Kent, which became the family home. In his later years he passed the castle to his elder son, moving to a purpose-built house in the grounds.

Jane Clark died in 1976. Her death was expected, but left Clark devastated. Several of his women friends had hopes of marriage to him. His closest female friend, across thirty years, was the photographer Janet Woods, wife of the engraver Reynolds Stone; in common with Clark's daughter and sons, she was dismayed when he announced his intention to marry Nolwen de Janzé-Rice, daughter of Frederic and Alice de Janzé. The family felt that Clark was acting precipitately in marrying someone he had not known well for very long, but the wedding took place in November 1977. Clark and his second wife remained together until his death.

=== Beliefs ===
Clark's parents were Liberal in outlook, and Ruskin's social and political views influenced the young Clark. Mary Beard wrote in a Guardian article that Clark was a lifelong Labour voter. His religious outlook was unconventional, but he believed in the divine, rejected atheism, and found the Church of England too secular in its outlook. (Note: Clark's widow said that her husband always had a profound Christian sensitivity, and that whenever he went into a church in search of works of art he would first kneel and pray.) Shortly before his death he was received into the Roman Catholic Church.

== Honours and legacy ==
=== Awards and memorials ===
State and other honours received by Clark included Knight Commander of the Order of the Bath in 1938; Fellow of the British Academy in 1949; Member of the Order of the Companions of Honour, 1959; life peer, 1969; (Note: As Baron Clark of Saltwood in the County of Kent.) Companion of Literature, 1974; and Member of the Order of Merit, 1976. Overseas honours included Commander of the Legion of Honour, France; Commander of the Order of the Lion of Finland; and the Order of Merit, Austria.

Clark was elected a member or honorary member of the Conseil Artistique des Musées Nationaux of France; the American Academy of Arts and Sciences; the American Institute of Architects; the Swedish Academy; the Spanish Academy; the Florentine Academy; the Académie française; and the Institut de France. He was awarded honorary degrees by the universities of Bath, Cambridge, Glasgow, Liverpool, London, Oxford, Sheffield, Warwick, York, and in the US Columbia and Brown universities. He was an honorary fellow of the Royal Institute of British Architects and the Royal College of Art. Other honours and awards included Serena Medal of the British Academy (for Italian Studies); the Gold Medal and Citation of Honour of New York University; and the US National Gallery of Art Medal. Clark's old school, Winchester College, holds an annual art history speaking competition for the Kenneth Clark Prize. The winner of the competition is awarded a golden Lord Clark Medal sculpted by a fellow Old Wykehamist, Anthony Smith. At the Courtauld Institute in London, the lecture theatre is named in Clark's honour.

=== Reputation ===
In 2014 the Tate held the "Kenneth Clark: Looking for Civilisation" exhibition, highlighting Clark's impact "as one of the most influential figures in British art of the twentieth century". The exhibition, drawing on works from Clark's personal collection and many other sources, examined his role as "a patron and collector, art historian, public servant and broadcaster ... bringing art in the twentieth century to a more popular audience". The BBC called him "arguably the most influential figure in 20th century British art". Clark's early and continuing insistence that Victorian architecture and art should be considered seriously contributed to a gradual change in public taste. The art historian Ayla Lepine writes that Clark's writing and his "perennial commitment to John Ruskin's output and significance" made an important contribution to the re-evaluation of Victorian art and architecture.

Clark knew that his broadly traditional view of art would be anathema to the Marxist element in the artistic world, and was unsurprised when he was attacked by younger critics, notably John Berger, in the 1970s. Clark's reputation among critics in the twenty-first century is higher for his books and television series than for his consistency as a collector. At the time of the Tate celebration of Clark in 2014, the critic Richard Dorment commented that both in his public and private capacity Clark made many fine purchases but also many errors. In addition to the Andrea Previtali Scenes from Tebaldeo's Eclogues, Dorment lists works misattributed by Clark to Michelangelo, Pontormo, Elsheimer and Claude, and a Seurat and a Corot that were genuine but poor examples of the artists' work.

Among his books is what Dorment has called "the best introduction to the art of Leonardo da Vinci ever written". Piper singles out, in addition to the Leonardo monograph, Clark's Piero della Francesca (1951), The Nude (1956, based on his Mellon lectures in Washington in 1953), and Rembrandt and the Italian Renaissance (1966 from his Wrightsman lectures in New York). The critic Jackie Wullschlager wrote in 2014 that it was as a writer rather than a collector that Clark excelled: "unrivalled since Ruskin for lucidity, erudition, moral conviction". James Hall, in The Guardian, expressed a similar view, calling Clark "the most seductive writer on art since Ruskin and Pater ... " In The Oxford Dictionary of Architecture James Stevens Curl ranks Clark higher than Ruskin as a writer: "Although he claimed Ruskin was a major influence on his thought, he delivered his own messages with lucidity, elegance, and aplomb, never wallowing in purple prose or exaggeration (faults painfully evident in Ruskin's work)". Hall concludes, "Today, when most art historians write as joylessly as lawyers and accountants, such verve is sorely needed".

== Books by Clark ==
- The Gothic Revival (1928)
- Catalogue of Drawings of Leonardo da Vinci in the collection of His Majesty the King at Windsor Castle (1935) 2 vols.
- One Hundred Details in the National Gallery (1938)
- Last Lectures by Roger Fry, edited with an introduction (1939)
- Leonardo da Vinci: An Account of his development as an Artist (1939) revised ed. 1952 and 1967
- Constable's Hay Wain (1944)
- L. B. Alberti on Painting (1944)
- Florentine Painting: The Fifteenth Century (1945)
- Introduction to Praeterita (1949)
- Landscape into Art (1949) adapted from his Slade Lectures
- Piero della Francesca (1951) "complete" ed. 1969
- Moments of Vision (1954) the Romanes Lecture for 1954
- The Nude: A Study in Ideal Form (1956) A. W. Mellon Lectures in the Fine Arts, delivered in 1953
- Looking at Pictures (1960 and 1972)
- Ruskin Today (1964)
- Rembrandt and the Italian Renaissance (1966)
- A Failure of Nerve (1967)
- The Drawings by Leonardo da Vinci in the Collection of Her Majesty the Queen at Windsor Castle (1968–1969) with Carlo Pedretti, 3 vols.
- Civilisation: A Personal View (1969) book version of the television series
- The Artist Grows Old (1972) Rede Lecture
- Westminster Abbey (1972)
- Blake and Visionary Art (1973)
- Romantic versus Classic Art (1973)
- The Romantic Rebellion (1973) book version of the television series
- Another Part of the Wood: A Self-Portrait (1974) vol. 1 of autobiography
- Henry Moore Drawings (1974)
- The Drawings by Sandro Botticelli for Dante's Divine Comedy (1976)
- The Other Half: A Self-Portrait (1977) vol. 2 of autobiography
- Animals and Men (1977)
- The Best of Aubrey Beardsley (1978)
- An Introduction to Rembrandt (1979)
- What is a Masterpiece? (1979)
- Feminine Beauty (1980)
- The Art of Humanism (1983)

Source: Who's Who.

== Notes, references and sources ==
=== Sources ===
- Clark, Kenneth (1969). Civilisation: A Personal View. London: BBC and John Murray. OCLC 879537495.
- Clark, Kenneth (1974). Another Part of the Wood: A Self-Portrait. London: John Murray. ISBN 978-0-340-20811-3. OCLC 855447282.
- Clark, Kenneth (1977). The Other Half: A Self-Portrait. London: John Murray. ISBN 978-0-7195-3432-4.
- Conlin, Jonathan (2006). The Nation's Mantelpiece: A History of the National Gallery. London: Pallas Athene. ISBN 978-1-84368-018-5.
- Cumming, Robert (2015). My dear BB ...: The Letters of Bernard Berenson and Kenneth Clark, 1925–1959. New Haven: Yale University Press. ISBN 978-0-300-20737-8.
- Curl, James Stevens; Susan Wilson (2015). The Oxford Dictionary of Architecture. Oxford: Oxford University Press. ISBN 978-0-19-967498-5.
- Foss, Brian (2007). War Paint: Art, War, State and Identity in Britain, 1939–1945. New Haven and London: Yale University Press. ISBN 978-0-300-10890-3.
- Hearn, Marcus (2005). Civilisation. London: BBC. OCLC 778343652.
- Hotta-Lista, Akayo (2013). The Japan-British Exhibition of 1910. Oxford and New York: Routledge. ISBN 978-1-315-07353-8.
- Lancaster, Osbert (1956). Pillar to Post (second ed.). London: John Murray. OCLC 30185143.
- Lloyd, Stephen (2001). William Walton: Muse of Fire. Woodbridge: Boydell. ISBN 978-0-85115-803-7.
- Rothenstein, John (1970). Time's Thievish Progress. London: Cassell. ISBN 978-0-304-93578-9.
- Secrest, Meryle (1984). Kenneth Clark: A Biography. London: Weidenfeld and Nicolson. ISBN 978-0-297-78398-5.
- Stansky, Peter (2003). Sassoon. New Haven: Yale University Press. ISBN 978-0-300-09547-0.
- Stourton, James (2016). Kenneth Clark: Life, Art and Civilisation. London: Collins. ISBN 978-0-00-749341-8.
- Torrance, David (2008). George Younger. Edinburgh: Birlinn. ISBN 978-1-84158-686-1.

=== Further reading ===
- Shenton, Caroline (2021). National Treasures: Saving the Nation's Art in World War II. London: John Murray. ISBN 978-1-529-38743-8.
- Stephens, Chris; Stonnard, John-Paul (2014). Kenneth Clark: Looking for Civilisation. London: Tate. ISBN 978-1-84976-260-1.

Cultural offices
Preceded by Sir Augustus Daniel	Director of the National Gallery; 1934–1946	Succeeded by Sir Philip Hendy
Preceded by Sir Ernest Pooley	Chair of the Arts Council of Great Britain; 1953–1960	Succeeded by Lord Cottesloe
Honorary titles
Preceded by C. H. Collins Baker	Surveyor of the King's Pictures; 1934–1944	Succeeded by Anthony Blunt
Academic offices
Preceded by Lord Harewood	Chancellor of the University of York; 1967–1978	Succeeded by Michael Swann
Media offices
Preceded by New office	Chairman of the Independent Television Authority; 1954–1957	Succeeded by Sir Ivone Kirkpatrick
