= Upper Terrace House =

Coordinates: 51°33′36″N 0°10′52″W

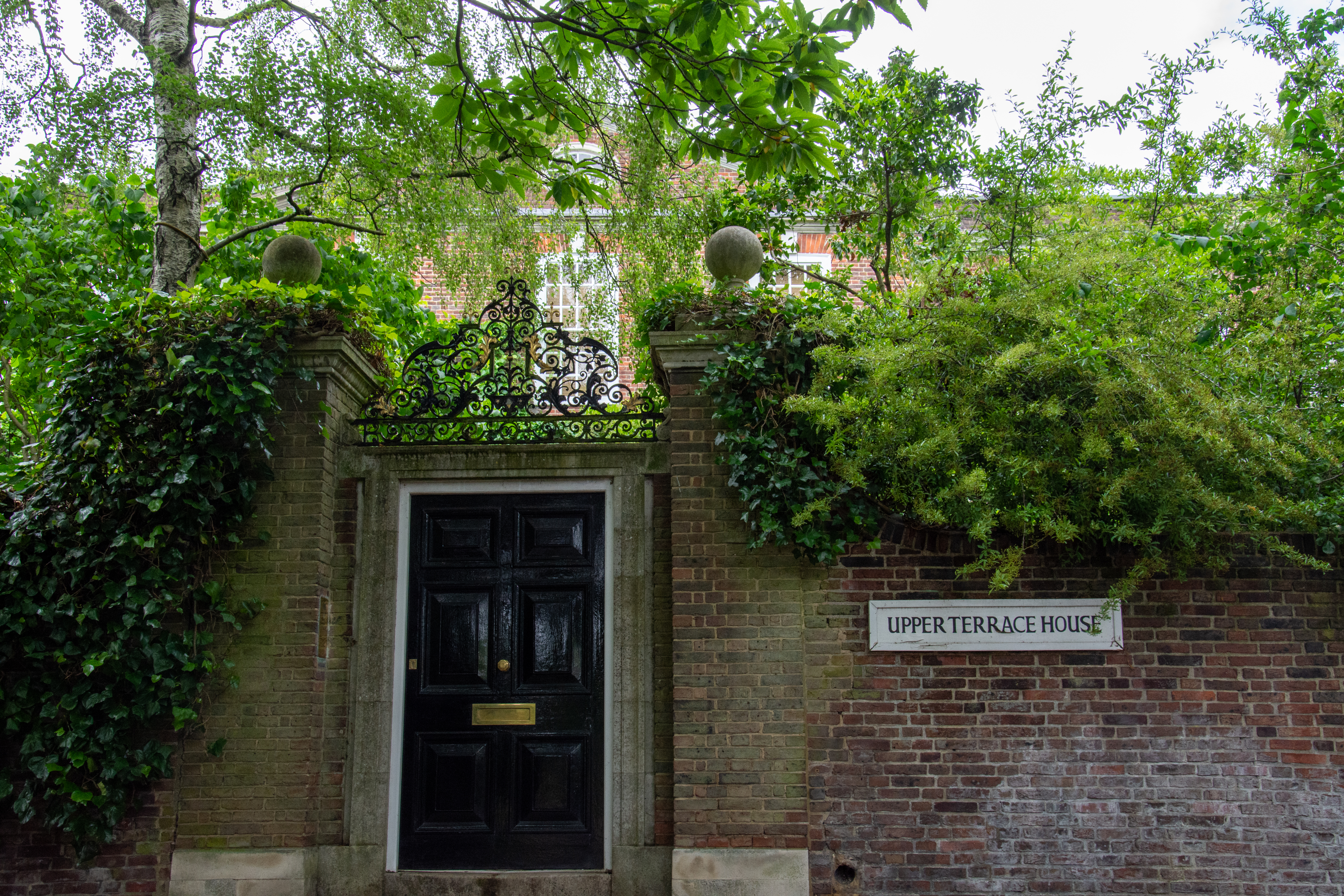
The entrance to Upper Terrace House in 2021

Upper Terrace House is a house in Hampstead in the London Borough of Camden. It has been listed Grade II on the National Heritage List for England (NHLE) since March 1997.

Upper Terrace House dates to the 1740s when it was a terrace of three houses, it was remodelled into a single residence between 1931 and 1932 by Oliver Hill. The NHLE listing describes Hill's remodelling of the facade of the house as demonstrating "how thin was the divide between stripped classicism and full-blown modernism in his work at this time, despite Vogue Regency detailing and the importation of genuine C18 elements to the interior". Additional expansion occurred between 1937 and 1938 by James Forbes of Forbes and Tate. Hill's remodelling was carried out for the amateur architect Colonel Reggie Cooper and his wife. The house was the subject of the main article in the 4 June 1932 issue of Country Life, which included extensive photographs of the interior and exterior.

The art historian and administrator Kenneth Clark and his family moved to the house in 1946 having previously lived at nearby Capo Di Monte on Judge's Walk.

A watercolour of Upper Terrace House by Hugh Casson sold at auction at Christie's in 2005. The sculptor Henry Moore displayed his maquettes for his Madonna & Child at St Matthew's Church, Northampton on the mantelpiece of Upper Terrace House to Clark and Herbert Read so they could give their opinion on his progress towards the finished piece.

Clark's lifelong friend Colin Anderson moved to nearby Admiral's House at the same time that Clark bought Upper Terrace House.
