= James Stourton =

English art historian (born 1956)

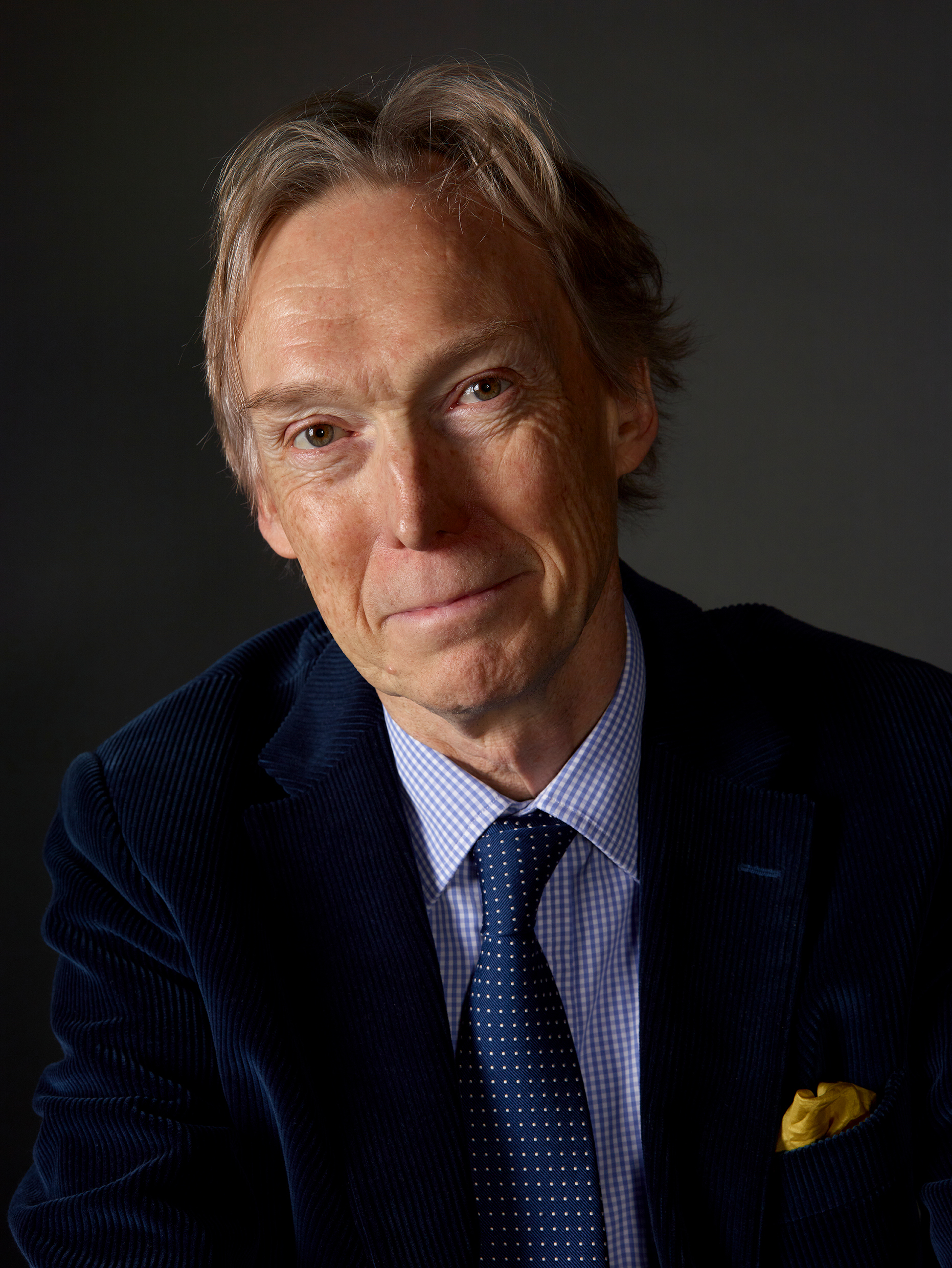
James Stourton in 2025

James Alastair Stourton (born 3 July 1956 in York, England) is a British art historian and a former chairman of Sotheby's UK.

== Education ==
Stourton was educated at Ampleforth College, North Yorkshire and then Magdalene College, Cambridge, where he took an MA in History of Art.

== Personal life ==
Stourton is the second son of Charles Edward Stourton, 23rd Baron Stourton, 27th Baron Segrave, 26th Baron Mowbray CBE and Jane de Yarburgh-Bateson, the only child of Lord Deramore. In 1993 Stourton married Sophie Stonor, daughter of Thomas Stonor, 7th Baron Camoys. The marriage was dissolved by annulment.. Stourton was partner to Charity Charity, former worldwide creative director at JWT and Saatchi & Saatchi, until her death in 2021. In 2026 Stourton married Dr Verity Mackenzie, an art historian and Affiliated Lecturer at the University of Cambridge.

== Career ==
Stourton began his career at Sotheby's as an Old Master paintings specialist in 1979 and held many positions there, rising to the UK Chairmanship. He left the auction house in 2012 to become a Senior Fellow of the Institute of Historical Research, University of London.

Stourton’s publications include The British as Art Collectors, A History of British Art Collecting from the Tudors to the Present, with Charles Sebag-Montefiore (Scala, 2012), Great Houses of London (Frances Lincoln, 2012), which won the Spear’s Prize 2013, and Kenneth Clark (William Collins 2016), named The Sunday Times Art Book of the Year 2016. See also

Over the years Stourton has been a regular writer of reviews, obituaries and articles for The Daily Telegraph; The Independent; The Spectator; Apollo; The Art Newspaper; Country Life, The Literary Review and was consultant to The Economist art collecting supplement.

Stourton has written and published British Embassies: their diplomatic and architectural history (Frances Lincoln 2017) and Dudley House: An Architectural and Social History Dudley House, published Swan éditeur 2019.

Stourton was the proprietor of the Stourton Press, with an article featuring in Matrix 24: A Review For Printers And Bibliophiles, published Winter 2004, entitled 'A Month of Sundays: My time at Stourton Press'.

As well as being a Senior Fellow of the Institute of Historical Research of London University, Stourton sat on several government committees including the Panel of the Heritage Memorial Fund, and was Vice-Chairman of the Acceptance in Lieu Panel, from 2012 to 2021 in both cases. Stourton is Vice-President of the Roxburghe Club for bibliophiles.

For the 2025 to 2026 academic year Stourton has an Affiliate membership of Christ Church and Worcester College, Oxford.

=== Television, lecturing and journalism ===
Stourton has contributed to several television programmes, most recently for the BBC2 Culture Show programme on Kenneth Clark, screened Saturday 31 May 2014. Past programmes include appearances with Victoria Leatham in Heirs and Graces (1990) on the art collections at Highclere and Berkeley Castles; he was also a contributor to BBC4 series on British Art Collecting (screened July 2013). Today he acts as the consultant to Sky Arts television series on art collectors being produced by Colonial Pictures.

He frequently lectures on the history of art and collecting, having in the past delivered lectures for the Cambridge University History of Art faculty, The Art Fund, Sotheby's Institute and many others. Stourton gave the keynote address at Frick Museum seminar on Anglo-American art collecting on 6 May 2011: The Revolving Door: 300 years of British Art Collecting. He also delivered the lecture to close the celebrations for the 150th anniversary of the Italian unification at the Italian Embassy on 13 October 2011: The English Love Affair with Italy, 300 years of Art Collecting. In 2017 he was invited to give the Marlay Lecture at The Fitzwilliam Museum, Cambridge.

Stourton gave the 150th Anniversary Lecture of the Building of George Gilbert Scott's Foreign Office, entitled "Goths vs Romans: The Battle to Build the Foreign Office'.

=== Publications ===
- The Dictionary of Art (Macmillan) contributor, 1996
- Great Small Museums of Europe (Scala, 2003). Translated into four languages, Danish, Chinese, French and Japanese
- Great Collectors of our Time: Art Collecting Since 1945 (Scala, 2007), Apollo Book of the Year 2007
- ‘Robert, 9th Lord Petre’ in English Catholic Heroes (Gracewing, 2008)
- The British as Art Collectors, A History of British Art Collecting from the Tudors to the Present, with Charles Sebag-Montefiore (Scala, 2012)
- Great Houses of London (Frances Lincoln, 2012). winner of Spear's Prize 2013, new edition 2015
- Kenneth Clark (William Collins 2016), named The Sunday Times Art Book of the Year 2016. See also
- British Embassies: their diplomatic and architectural history (Frances Lincoln 2017)
- Dudley House: Anarchitectural and Social History, published Swan Editeur, Paris in 2019
- Whales & Sprats: A Showing of Books from the Library of James Stourton, privately printed for the Roxburghe Club 2019
- Sponsor and publisher of The Lumley Inventory and Pedigree, Edited Mark Evans, 2010 for the Roxburghe Club
- ‘The Revolving Door: Four Centuries of British Collecting’ in British Models of Art Collecting and the American Response, Edited by Inge Reist, Frick 2014
- Heritage A History of How We Conserve Our Past (Head of Zeus, 2022)
- Rogues and Scholars: Boom and Bust in the London Art Market 1945-2000 (Head of Zeus, 2024)
- The Nursery Screen: A Partial Memoir (distributed by Heywood Hill, 2026)

=== Sotheby's career ===
Stourton joined the British Painting Department of Sotheby’s, London in 1979. By 2006 Stourton was Chairman of Sotheby’s UK.

During his time at Sotheby's Stourton organised many sales including the Ava Gardner Collection, the Bentinck-Thyssen Old Master Painting Collection, the Edward Fattorini Dutch Painting Collection, the Arturo Lopez-Wilshaw Silver Sale, the Palazzo Corsini Sale in Florence, the Guy de Rothschild sale in Monte-Carlo, the Sale of Charles de Beistegui at Château de Groussay.

He was behind the sale of many famous libraries including those of Fred Adams, the Montefiore Collection of Hebrew Manuscripts, the Macclesfield Library from Shirburn Castle, and the Wardington Collection of Maps and Atlases.

Whilst at Sotheby's he instituted the first Graduate Trainee Scheme, in 1987, which provided a very significant number of today's senior European directors, and in 2006 also initiated the Historic Houses Association/Sotheby's annual prize for a country house restoration.
