= C. H. Collins Baker =

English art historian and painter

Charles Henry Collins Baker
- Born: 24 January 1880; Ilminster
- Died: 3 July 1959 (aged 79); Finchley

Academic work
- Notable works: Lely and the Stuart Portrait Painters

Charles Henry Collins Baker CVO (24 January 1880 – 3 July 1959) was an English art historian and painter.

== Life and work ==
Charles Henry Collins Baker was born in Ilminster, Somerset, the son of John Collins Baker and Fanny Henrietta Remmet. He was educated in Berkhamsted and the Royal Academy Schools. A landscape painter at the beginning of his career, he exhibited at the Royal Academy in 1907 and at the New English Art Club in 1909–16; from 1921 to 1925 he was the club's honorary secretary. In 1911, he became the art critic for the Saturday Review, succeeding D. S. MacColl, and became an assistant and secretary to Sir Charles Holroyd, Director of the National Gallery. While working at the Gallery he befriended E. M. Forster, who was working there as a cataloguer and guard.

In 1912, Collins Baker wrote Lely and the Stuart Portrait Painters, considered to be his most important book; Ellis Waterhouse called it the "last great scholarly monument" of "the last great age of the self-taught scholar in England, before it was permissible to call oneself an art historian". From 1914 he held the post of Keeper of the National Gallery, and was retained when Charles Holmes succeeded Holroyd as Director in 1916. Collins Baker and Holroyd have been described as the "driving forces of the Gallery" of that period. From 1928 he took on the position of Surveyor of the King's Pictures. Oliver Millar, a later holder of the post, described him as "a nice and kind man, but untrained in scholarly method." He was a senior research associate in the Huntington Library in San Marino, California, from 1932 to 1949. He died at his home in Finchley, Middlesex, in 1959.

== Publications ==
- Lely and the Stuart Portrait Painters (1912)
- A Catalogue of the Petworth Collection (1920)
- Crome (1921)
- Lely and Kneller (1922)
- A Catalogue of the Pictures at Hampton Court (1929)
- A Catalogue of the British Paintings in the Henry E Huntington Library and Art Gallery (1936)
- A Catalogue of the Principal Pictures in the Royal Collection at Windsor Castle (1937)
- A Catalogue of William Blake's Drawings and Paintings in the Huntington Library (1938)
- The Life and Circumstances of James Brydges, 1st Duke of Chandos (1948)

Cultural offices
Preceded by Hawes Harison Turner	Keeper of the National Gallery; 1914–1934	Succeeded by Edwin Glasgow
Court offices
Preceded by Sir Lionel Cust	Surveyor of the King's Pictures; 1928–1934	Succeeded by Sir Kenneth Clark
