= Augustus Daniel =

Sir Augustus Moore Daniel KBE (6 December 1866 – 7 November 1950) was a British curator who served as director of the National Gallery in London from January 1929 to December 1933.

Daniel was born in Preston, Lancashire, the son of Dr. Edward MacManus Daniel. He was educated at Repton School and Trinity College, Cambridge.

As a young man, Daniel travelled abroad studying the attribution of paintings with Roger Fry. He was appointed as a Trustee of the National Gallery in 1925, apparently due to his being a personal friend and golfing partner of the prime minister, Stanley Baldwin. His installation as Director in January 1929 is seen as a strike against "experts" and the increasing professionalisation of art history, on the part of the Trustees.

In 1929, the Gallery bought the Wilton Diptych and Titian's group portrait of The Vendramin Family; these are considered the two major purchases of Daniel's directorship. Also that year the highly controversial dealer Joseph Duveen became a Trustee. Jonathan Conlin's history of the National Gallery describes Daniel as a "self-effacing nonentity" but Fry, for one, admired his "terrific energy and intellectual beefiness". Like many directors of the National Gallery, he was a trustee of the Iveagh Bequest.

Daniel was appointed an honorary Fellow of the Royal Institute of British Architects in 1929 and an honorary Litt.D. of Cambridge in 1931. He was appointed a Knight Commander of the Order of the British Empire (KBE) in the 1932 New Year Honours.

In 1904, he married Margery Welsh. He died at his home in London, aged 83.
