= Capo di Monte, Hampstead =

House in London, England

Coordinates: 51°33′37″N 0°10′54″W

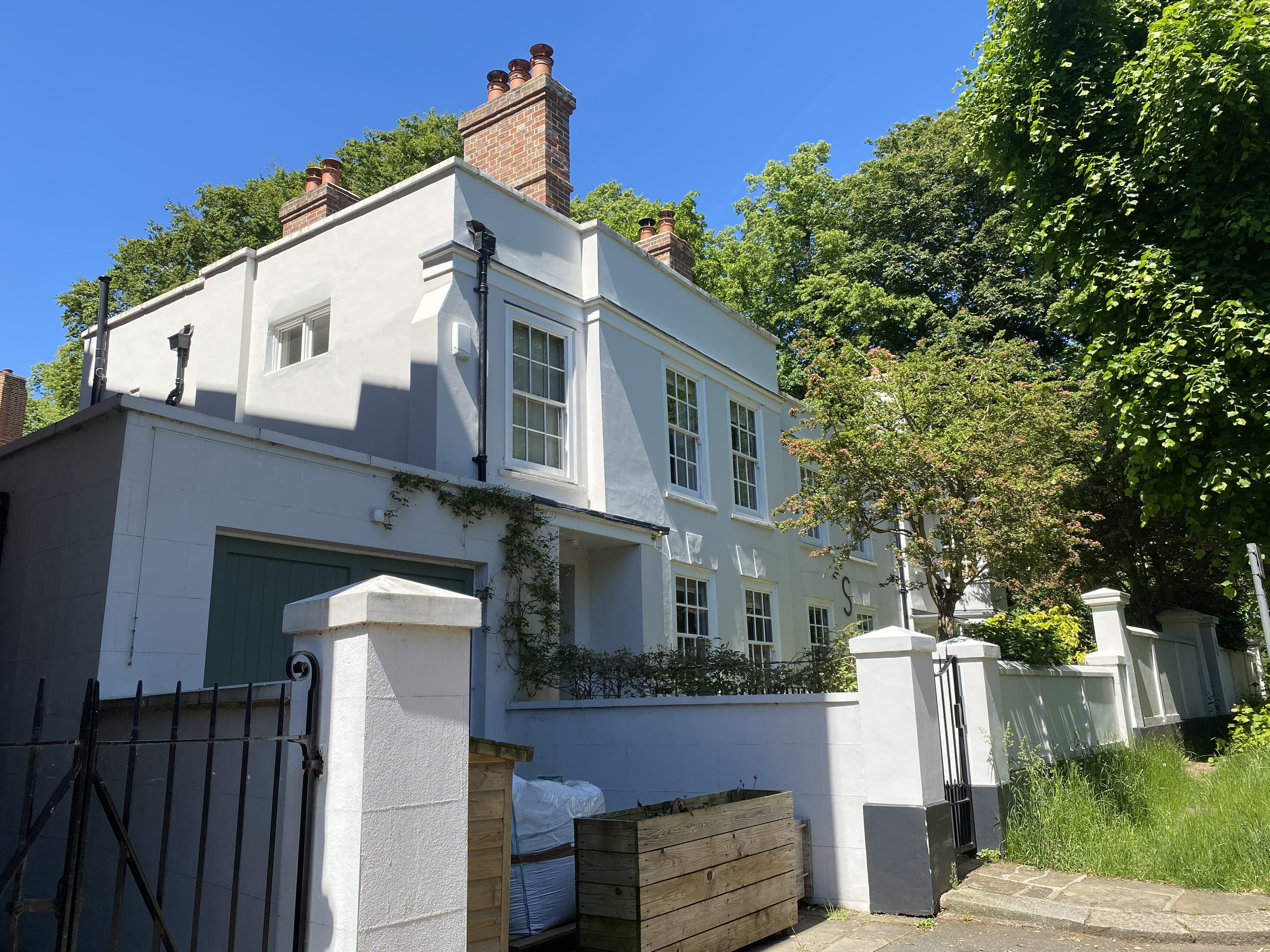
Capo di Monte in June 2021

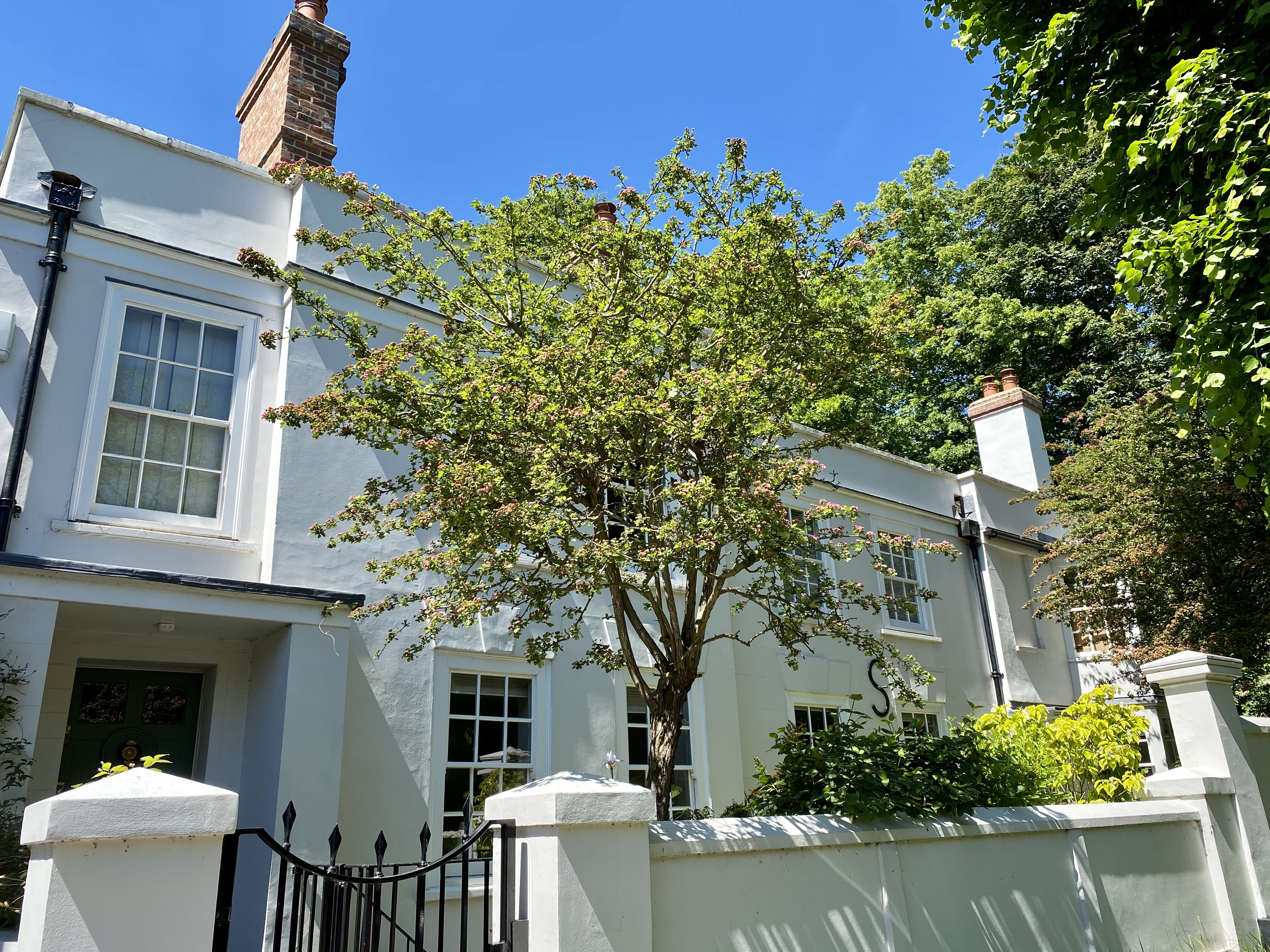

Capo di Monte at 3 Judges's Walk on Windmill Hill is a house in Hampstead in the London Borough of Camden. It is listed Grade II on the National Heritage List for England. The house stands on the corner of Upper Terrace and Judge's Walk.

The house dates to the late 18th century and has been considerably altered. It was in existence by 1762. It is rendered in stucco with weatherboard extensions to the rear. It is 2 storeys with a basement. The actress Sarah Siddons stayed at the house from 1804 to 1805; an "S" above the door commemorates her residence. Mavis Norris, in The Book of Hampstead, describes the house as 'three cottages knocked into one'. The house subsequently became known as Siddons Cottage. The secretary of the Athenaeum Club, a Mr. Macgrath, lived in the house after Siddons.

The art historian and administrator Kenneth Clark and his family moved to Capo di Monte in 1941, having previously rented Upton House in Gloucestershire. Stephen Spender and his wife Natasha regularly dined with the Clarks at the house during the war. The Clarks moved from the house to nearby Upper Terrace House in 1946. The house later became the residence of Marghanita Laski.

The house was put up for sale for £6.9 million in 2020.

A drawing of Capo di Monte by Frederick Charles Richards is in the collection of the Newport Museum in Newport, Wales.
