= Charlie Bell (clown) =

American circus clown (1886–1964)

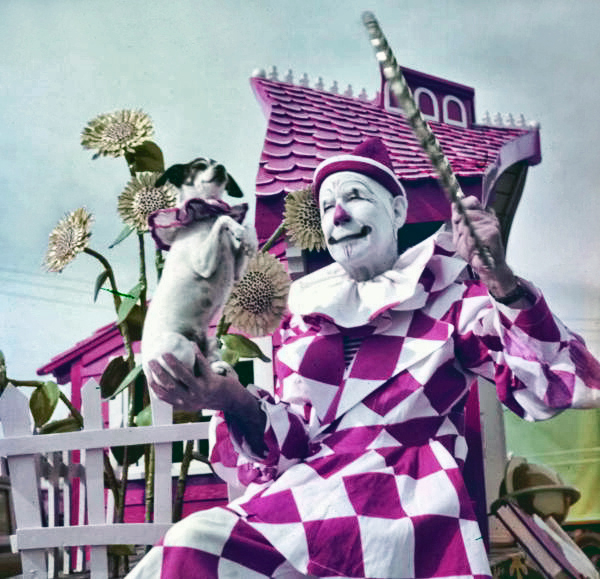
- Ringling Circus clown Charlie Bell with his performing pet fox terrier in 1953
- Born: Charles D. Chase; 1886; Barnesville, Ohio, U.S.
- Died: September 26, 1964 (aged 77–78); Sarasota, Florida, U.S.
- Occupation: Circus clown
- Spouse: Gertrude Bell
- Children: 1

Charles D. Chase (1886 – September 26, 1964), known professionally as Charlie Bell, was a circus performer for Ringling Bros. and Barnum & Bailey Circus known for his work in Cecil B. DeMille's The Greatest Show on Earth. Known early in his career as the "world's greatest tumbler," he was part of an acrobatic troupe known as Rice, Bell and Baldwin. He joined Ringling Brothers in 1921 and worked there until his retirement in 1956. He was inducted into the International Circus Hall of Fame in 1969. He was also one of four clowns featured on boxes of Kellogg's Honey Smacks cereal in 1956. Bell would often perform with small dogs, Trixie and Honey Boy, which he would dress up to look like other animals such as a rabbit or an elephant.

== Personal life ==
Bell married Getrude Bell and had one daughter Charlotte Bell Kora. His two granddaughters, Tessie and Tosca Kora Fornasari, were both circus performers as is his great granddaughter Nicolette Fornasari.
