= Peter Stansky =

American historian

Peter David Lyman Stansky (born January 18, 1932) is an American historian specializing in modern British history.

== Works ==
- Ambitions and Strategies: The Struggle for the Leadership of the Liberal Party in the 1890s (1964)
- Journey to the Frontier: Julian Bell and John Cornford: Their lives and the 1930s, with William Abrahams (1966)
- Conference on British Studies Biographical series, editor, 6 vols.(1968–1974)
- The Left and War: The British Labour Party and the First World War, editor (1969)
- John Morley Nineteenth Century Essays, editor (1970)
- The Unknown Orwell, with William Abrahams (1972)
- Winston Churchill: A Profile, editor (1973)
- The Victorian Revolution, editor (1973)
- England Since 1867: Continuity and Change (1973)
- The Aesthetic Movement and the Art and Crafts Movement, editor, with Rodney Shewan. A reprint series of 73 volumes (1976, 1979)
- Orwell: The Transformation, with William Abrahams (1979)
- Gladstone: A Progress in Politics (1979)
- Modern British History Series, editor, 18 vol. with Leslie Hume (1982)
- William Morris (1983)
- On Nineteen Eighty-Four, editor (1983)
- Redesigning the World: William Morris, the 1880s, and the Arts and Crafts (1985)
- Modern European History Series, editor, 47 vols. (1987–1992)
- London's Burning, with William Abrahams (1994)
- On or About December 1910: Early Bloomsbury and its Intimate World (1996)
- Another Book that Never Was (1998)
- From William Morris to Sergeant Pepper (1999) includes bibliography of writings 1954–1998
- Sassoon: The Worlds of Philip and Sybil (2003)
- The First Day of the Blitz (2007)
- Julian Bell: From Bloomsbury to the Spanish Civil War (2012)
- Edward Upward: Art and Life (2016)
- ‘’The Socialist Patriot: George Orwell and War’’ (2023)
