= Royal Park of Capodimonte =

Park in Naples

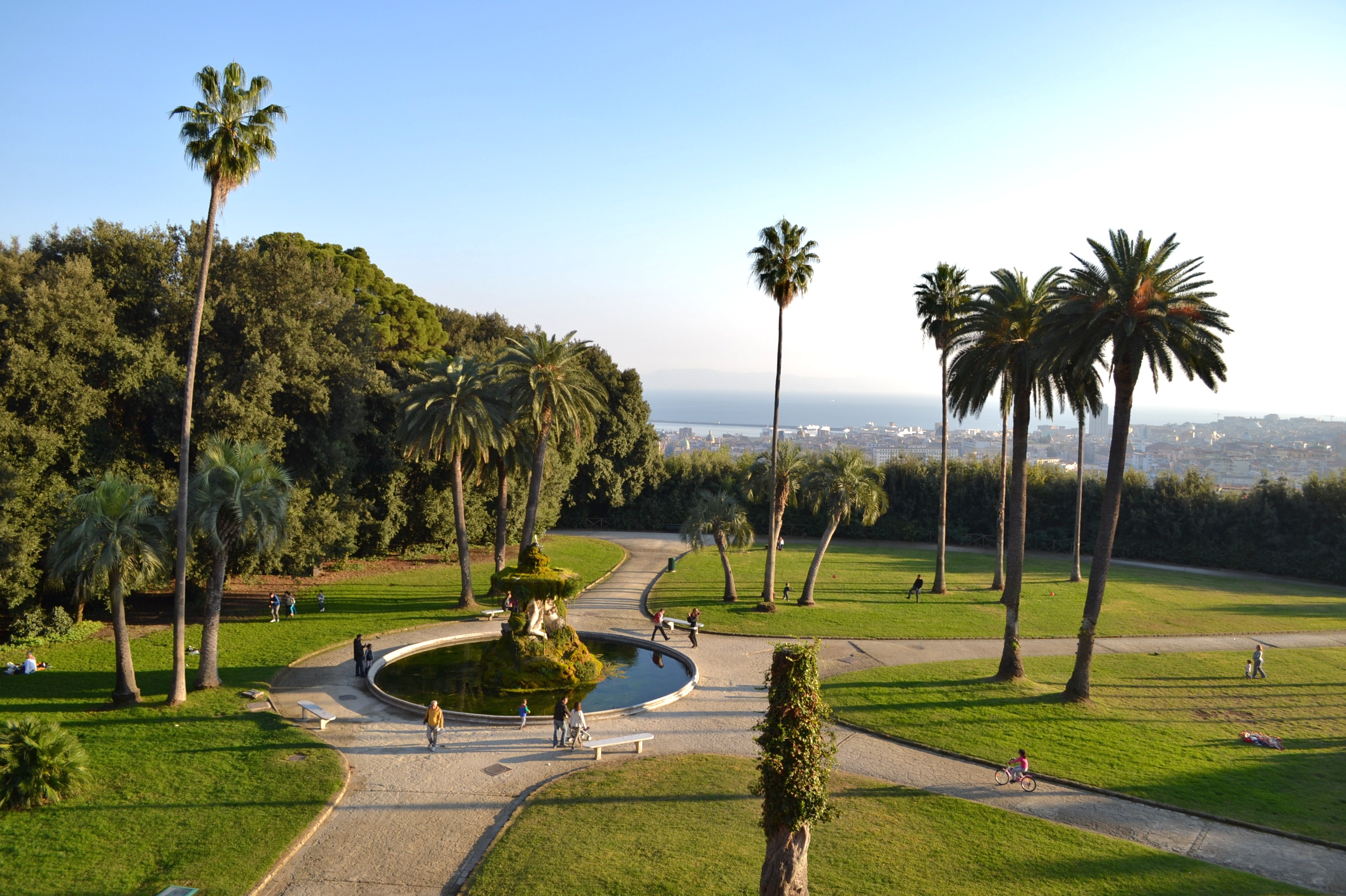
- Interactive map of Royal Park of Capodimonte
- Type: Municipal Park & Natural Area
- Location: Naples, Campania
- Coordinates: 40°52′09.9″N 14°15′07.3″E
- Area: 1.24 kilometres (0.77 mi)
- Created: 1743
- Operator: Municipality of Naples; Italian Ministry of Culture
- Website: capodimonte.cultura.gov.it

The Royal Park of Capodimonte (Italian: Real Bosco di Capodimonte, lit. 'Royal Wood of Capodimonte') is a public urban park in Naples, in the Capodimonte quarter and surrounding the Palace of Capodimonte.

== History ==
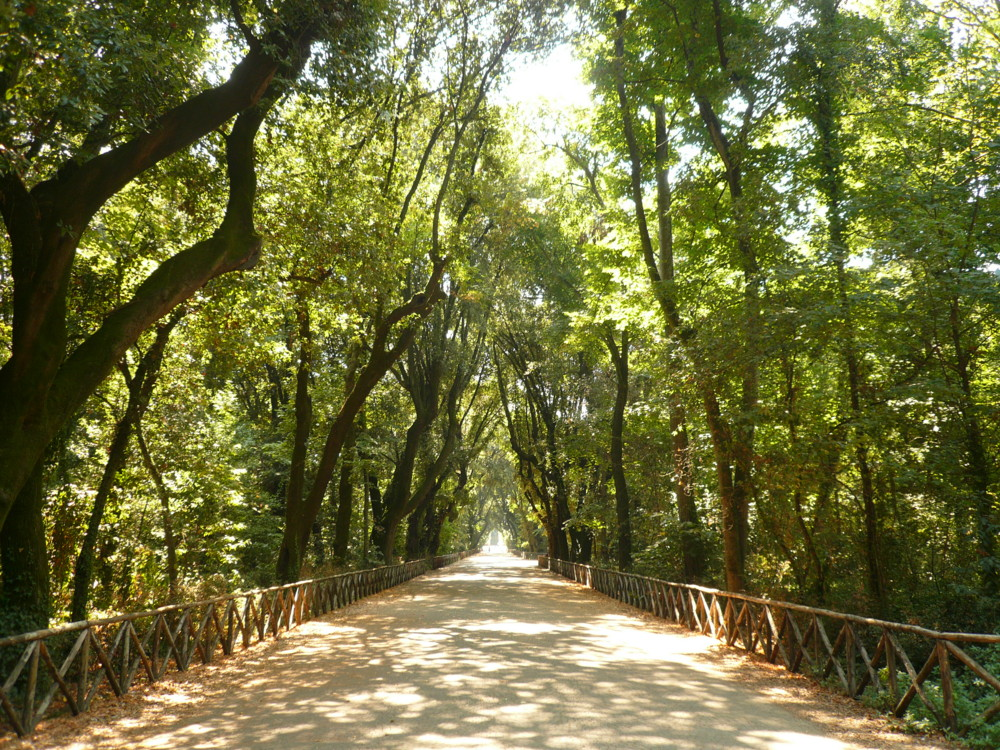
Central avenue

Used as early as 1735 for hunting activities by Charles III of Spain, a great passion of his, the construction of the Park of Capodimonte began in 1742 and was completed the following year under the direction of the architect Ferdinando Sanfelice. He created, over an area of one hundred and twenty-four hectares, which also included the Royal Palace of Capodimonte then under construction, a park of great visual and perspectival impact, typical of Enlightenment vision, yet at the same time scenographic, reflecting influences of the late Baroque period. The park featured panoramic areas with views over Posillipo, the hill of San Martino, and Mount Vesuvius; restoration works were also carried out on all the structures within the park, used as residences, churches, workshops, or farms.

Following the return to the throne of the Kingdom of the Two Sicilies by Ferdinand I of the Two Sicilies after the brief French decade, the park was opened to the public twice a year, on the occasion of religious festivities, to allow access to the Hermitage of the Capuchins, located at the edge of the woods.

Between 1836 and 1837, redevelopment works were carried out under the supervision of the botanist Friedrich Dehnhardt: he introduced the typical English landscape garden, particularly in the flowerbeds surrounding the palace, and planted tree species, some of which were rare and exotic, such as Thuja and eucalyptus. He also arranged the belvederes, clearing the view towards Mount Vesuvius and the Gulf of Naples.

After the Italian unification, the House of Savoy also used the park mainly for hunting expeditions: the main innovations in this period, between 1878 and 1900, were the introduction of palms, typical of the Oriental taste of the time, and the arrangement of the belvedere overlooking Naples, with the creation of a fountain reusing statues previously placed along the park avenues, particularly from the Torre garden area.

Severely damaged during World War II, the park was reopened to the public on 3 March 1951. Between 1966 and 1967 it was restored on the occasion of the inauguration of the National Museum of Capodimonte, and opened as a public park, followed by further restoration works between 1990 and 2000.

== Description ==
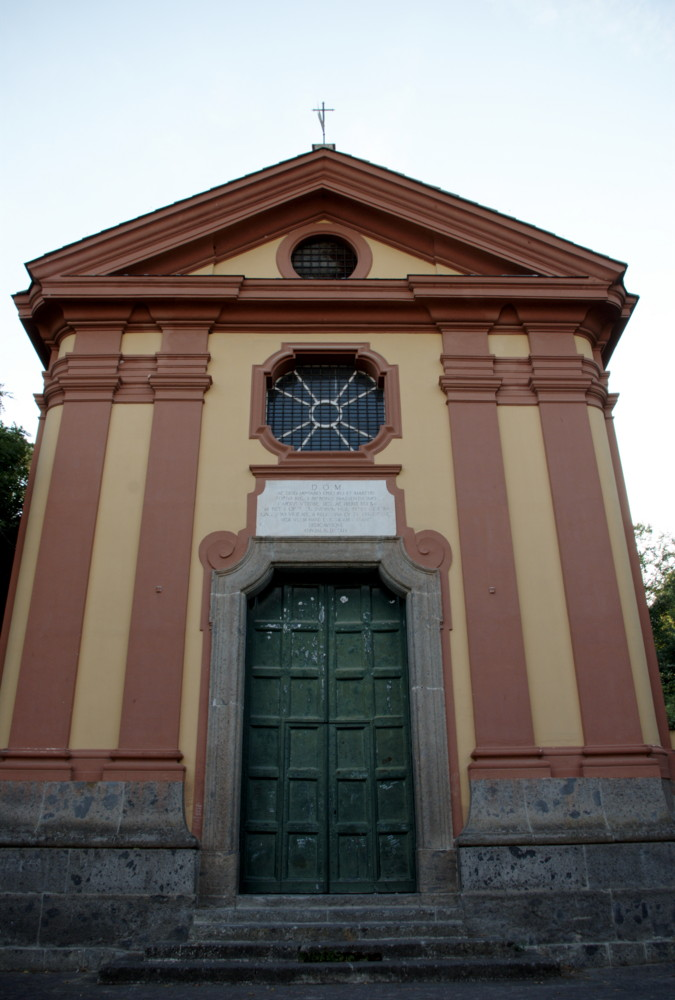
Church of San Gennaro, one of the buildings within the park

The Park of Capodimonte extends over an area of 124 hectares, partially enclosed by a boundary wall built in the 1820s: from the same period date two entrance gates, Porta Grande, along Via Ponti Rossi, with two lateral guardhouses, and Porta Piccola, whose guardhouses were constructed in 1835 and heavily modified over time. A third gate, Porta Caccetta, was created in 1816, enlarged in 1834, demolished during the mid-20th century, and restored in the early 2000s.

Before entering the central core of the park, visitors pass the palace gardens, so called because they surround the building that houses the National Museum of Capodimonte, also known as the Spianato. These consist of large grassy flowerbeds laid out at the end of the 18th century, later enriched from the late nineteenth century with Canary Island date palms, Washingtonia, groups of Phoenix reclinata, Chamaerops humilis, Cycas revoluta and Livistona chinensis; the original flowerbed borders, particularly composed of roses, have instead been lost.

Access to the wooded part of the park is provided by three gates: the main one is Porta di Mezzo, featuring a wrought iron gate considered one of the most elegant examples of Rococo works in Naples, completed in 1736 and originally decorated with Bourbon coats of arms and effigies. It is flanked by guardhouses and the custodian's residence, designed by Antonio Canevari and completed by Ferdinando Fuga. The other entrances are Porta di Miano, built between 1837 and 1840, and Porta di Santa Maria dei Monti, constructed either at the end of the eighteenth century or by the French, later falling into disuse and named after a nearby ancient monastery.

The park contains more than four hundred varieties of ancient trees, including oaks, holm oaks, elms, lindens and chestnut trees. Alongside these, fruit tree cultivations, particularly citrus trees, were once present; moreover, when the area served as a royal hunting reserve, species such as turtle doves, garden warblers, thrushes, pheasants imported from Bohemia, hares, rabbits, and deer could be found.

Beyond Porta di Mezzo lies an elliptical clearing from which five avenues radiate in a fan shape, originally decorated with benches, artificial ruins such as the so-called Grottino in opus listatum, and statues, many of which—some arranged by Ferdinando Fuga—have been largely lost. Among the few surviving are the statue of the Giant, made from fragments of ancient marble, and the Months. Of the five avenues, the central one, also called Viale di Mezzo, is 125 metres long and lined with holm oaks which, through pruning, form a kind of gallery; from each avenue numerous paths branch off into the woodland.

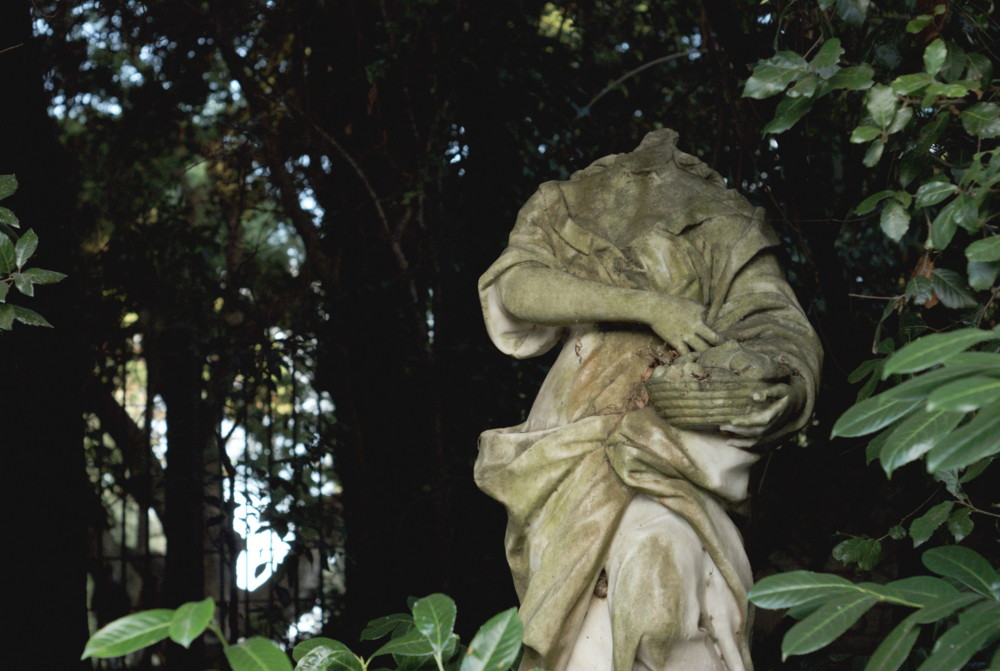
Statue in the park

Within the park are several buildings that have served a variety of purposes over time: the Casino dei Principi, which in 1826 became the residence of the children of Francis I of the Two Sicilies; the Royal Porcelain Factory, restored by Ferdinando Sanfelice in 1743 and later converted into a vocational institute for ceramics; the Church of San Gennaro, commissioned by Charles of Bourbon for the park's inhabitants and completed in 1745; the Hermitage of the Capuchins, built between 1817 and 1819 in Neo-Gothic style as a vow by Ferdinand after regaining the kingdom following the French invasion, and later housing, in 1950, the Opera per la salute del fanciullo; the Casino della Regina, originally a resting place during hunting expeditions and later gifted around 1840 by Ferdinand II of the Two Sicilies to his mother Maria Isabella of Spain; and the Cataneo building, used for various purposes before becoming the place where workers received their assignments for maintaining the woodland.

Most of these buildings were, until the nineteenth-century restorations, surrounded by vegetable gardens and orchards, forming a kind of garden of delights. Among the few surviving examples is the so-called Torre garden: restored in 1999, it lies at the end of the central avenue and still preserves areas dedicated to cultivation, particularly citrus and other fruit trees, so much so that one section was known as the frutteria. Other gardens include the Purpignera, probably used for the cultivation of aromatic plants, and the secret garden, with a circular central basin, where rare fruit plants, mulberry trees and pineapples were grown.

In 2012 a project was launched to restore the vegetable garden, covering over 2,000 square metres, and a small nursery with typical crops from the Neapolitan area such as the San Marzano tomato, the cannellino bean of Acerra, and the papaccella napoletana. Among the structures dedicated to animal keeping were the riding school, the pheasantry (originally a gunpowder magazine), the goat house, the dairy, and several dovecotes for bird breeding, the latter located in the valley areas.

There are four ravines bordering the park: the Amendola, Cervi, Miano and San Gennaro ravines; the last of these is crossed by a bridge, known as the Hermitage Bridge, approximately twenty metres high.
