= Lefty Bell =

- Pitcher
- Batted: Unknown Threw: Left

Negro league baseball debut
- 1948, for the Homestead Grays

Last appearance
- 1948, for the Homestead Grays
- Stats at Baseball Reference

Teams
- Homestead Grays (1948)

Charles "Lefty" Bell was an American professional baseball pitcher in the Negro leagues. He played with the Homestead Grays during their 1948 Negro World Series championship season.
