= Charles F. Bell =

British art curator (1871–1966)

Charles F. Bell (1871 – 1966) was a British art curator. He was the first keeper of the fine art department at the Ashmolean Museum, serving there as an assistant keeper from 1896 and then keeper from 1909 to 1931. In 1911, along with Alexander Joseph Finberg and Lionel Cust, he founded the Walpole Society. Among his many acquaintances were T. E. Lawrence, Kenneth Clark, Bernard Berenson and Osbert Sitwell. Bell acted as a mentor to both Kenneth Clark and Francis Watson.

== Selected publications ==
- Bell, C. F. (1915). English Seventeenth-Century Portrait Drawings in Oxford Collections. The Volume of the Walpole Society, 5, 1-18.
- Bell, C. F. (1912). Le Sueur's Marble Bust of Charles I. The Burlington Magazine for Connoisseurs, 20(107), 293-294.
- Bell, C. F., Poole, R., & Poole, R. L. (1925).English seventeenth-century portrait drawings in Oxford Collections: Part II The Volume of the Walpole Society, 14, 43-80.
